= 2014–15 Newcastle United F.C. season =

Newcastle United
2014–15 season
- Chairman: Mike Ashley
- Manager: Alan Pardew (until 29 December); John Carver (from 29 December)
- Stadium: St James' Park
- Premier League: 15th
- FA Cup: Third round
- League Cup: Quarter-finals
- Top goalscorer: League: Papiss Cissé (11); All: Papiss Cissé (11)
Home colours	Away colours	Third colours

In the 2014–15 football season, English club Newcastle United competed in the Premier League for the fifth consecutive season. It was Newcastle United's 122nd season of professional football.

The season saw Newcastle end in 15th place after a difficult season for the Magpies. Newcastle started the season without a win from their opening eight games, and ended it by only winning three times in 19 Premier League games. Manager Alan Pardew was subject to protests during the opening run, but seemed to have turned a corner by following it with six consecutive wins, including a Capital One Cup victory at Manchester City. Pardew left Newcastle in January to join Crystal Palace, with manager John Carver taking over until the end of the season. He presided over some of Newcastle's worst ever league form, including a run of eight consecutive defeats. A win over West Ham on the final day of the season ultimately secured Newcastle survival.

== Chronological list of events ==
6 June 2014: 20-year-old Ayoze Pérez signs for the Magpies for an estimated fee of £1.6m from Tenerife.

9 June 2014: Jack Colback from Sunderland joins the Magpies on a free transfer.

11 June 2014: Stefan Broccoli, Michael Newberry, Lewis Suddick, Ben Pollock, Luke Charman, Jamie Holmes, Jack Hunter, Louis Johnson, Sean Longstaff, Ben Smith, Jake Trodd and Dan Ward sign scholarships with the club's academy. James Morgan, Lewis Aird and Macauley Booth leave the academy.

18 June 2014: The 2014–15 Premier League fixtures are released with the Magpies kicking off against reigning champions Manchester City for a second season running.

28 June 2014: James Tavernier signs for Championship side Wigan Athletic for an expected fee of £400K.

1 July 2014: Romain Amalfitano leaves on a free transfer for Dijon.

2 July 2014: Siem de Jong signs from Ajax for an expected fee of £7.5 million.

4 July 2014: The club appoints Dave Billows as Head of Fitness.

13 July 2014: Rémy Cabella signs from Montpellier for an expected fee of £8 million.

16 July 2014: Emmanuel Rivière signs from Monaco for an expected fee of £6.3 million.

17 July 2014: Mathieu Debuchy is transferred to Arsenal for an expected fee of £12 million.

17 July 2014: Daryl Janmaat signs from Feyenoord for an expected fee of £5 million.

22 July 2014: Sylvain Marveaux joins Guingamp on a season-long loan.

3 August 2014: Facundo Ferreyra signs from Shakhtar Donetsk on a season-long loan.

9 August 2014: Newcastle completes double signing of Karl Darlow and Jamaal Lascelles from Nottingham Forest for an expected combined fee of £7 million. Both are immediately loaned back to the selling club for the rest of the season.

30 August 2014: The Magpies score their first goals of the season in a 3–3 draw with Crystal Palace, including debut Newcastle goals for defender Mike Williamson and 18-year-old Rolando Aarons.

1 September 2014: Mapou Yanga-Mbiwa joins Roma on a season-long loan.

2 September 2014: Hatem Ben Arfa joins Hull City on a season-long loan.

18 October 2014: Newcastle gain their first league win of the season, with Gabriel Obertan scoring the only goal in a 1–0 win over Leicester City.

29 October 2014: A first away victory over Manchester City in 14 years saw Newcastle reach the quarter-finals of the League Cup for the first time since 2007.

9 November 2014: The Magpies record their fifth consecutive win in all competitions with a 2–0 away win against West Bromwich Albion to return to the top half of the Premier League table.

6 December 2014: Despite having Steven Taylor sent off, Newcastle record a third consecutive home win over Chelsea to bring the League leaders' 23-match unbeaten run in all competitions to an end.

13 December 2014: In Jak Alnwick's first start at the Emirates Stadium against Arsenal they lost 4–1 and Santi Cazorla scored a penalty past Alnwick.

17 December 2014: In the fifth round, Newcastle were eliminated from the League Cup by Tottenham Hotspur, 4–0.

21 December 2014: Newcastle lose their fourth consecutive Tyne-Wear derby for the first time in the club's history, losing by a goal to nil thanks to a 90th-minute goal by Adam Johnson. Cheick Tioté also picked up a fifth yellow card, meaning he will miss the Boxing Day fixture against Manchester United.

28 December 2014: The Magpies win their last match of 2014, winning 3–2 against Everton, with former Sunderland midfielder Jack Colback scoring his first League goal in a Newcastle shirt.

29 December 2014: Newcastle United manager Alan Pardew is given permission to speak to Crystal Palace regarding their vacant managerial role. Assistant manager John Carver is put in temporary charge of the side.

1 January 2015: In John Carver's first game as caretaker manager, they drew 3–3 against Burnley and Alan Pardew was on the stands at Villa Park to see Crystal Palace play against Aston Villa where it ended 0–0.

2 January 2015: Alan Pardew is appointed as Crystal Palace manager.

3 January 2015: In the Magpies' first match of the FA Cup third round, they were eliminated by Leicester City, 1–0.

4 January 2015: Newcastle United announce that Hatem Ben Arfa's contract has been terminated with mutual consent, with French Ligue 1 side Nice announcing the arrival of the player.

26 January 2015: John Carver is appointed as head coach until the end of 2014–15 season.

2 February 2015: On transfer deadline day, Davide Santon joined Internazionale on loan and Haris Vučkić, Remie Streete, Gaël Bigirimana, Shane Ferguson and Kevin Mbabu joined Rangers on loan.

9 February 2015: Eighteen-year-old midfielder Daniel Barlaser, capped by Turkey at Under–17 level, signs his first professional contract, committing himself to Newcastle United on a long-term deal of unspecified length.

4 March 2015: In the Magpies' 1–0 loss against Manchester United, Papiss Cissé was suspended seven matches for spitting at Jonny Evans, while he was suspended for six matches. But one of Cissé's suspension is for arm butting Séamus Coleman in a 3–2 win against Everton on 28 December 2014.

27 March 2015: Ten youth players are offered scholarships at Newcastle United effective from 1 July 2015. They are Yannick Aziakonou, Owen Bailey, Shane Donaghey, Owen Gallacher, Nathan Harker, Mackenzie Heaney, Dan Lowther, Lewis McNall, Callum Smith and Craig Spooner. Meanwhile, academy players Macaulay Gillesphey, Tom Heardman, Liam Smith and Jamie Sterry all signed professional contracts at the club, Kyle Cameron, Jamie Cobain, Liam Gibson, Adam Laidler, Brendan Pearson and Callum Williams are all retained as third year scholars and James Atkinson, Ben Drennan, Andy Hall, Joe Kerridge, Ryan McKinnon, Greg Olley, Jonathyn Quinn and Jordan Storey are all released.

29 May 2015: Sammy Ameobi is offered a new contract by Newcastle United, but Jak Alnwick, Adam Campbell, Jonás Gutiérrez, Remie Streete and Ryan Taylor are all released. Facundo Ferreyra returns to Skakhtar Donetsk after his season-long loan deal expired.

== Club ==
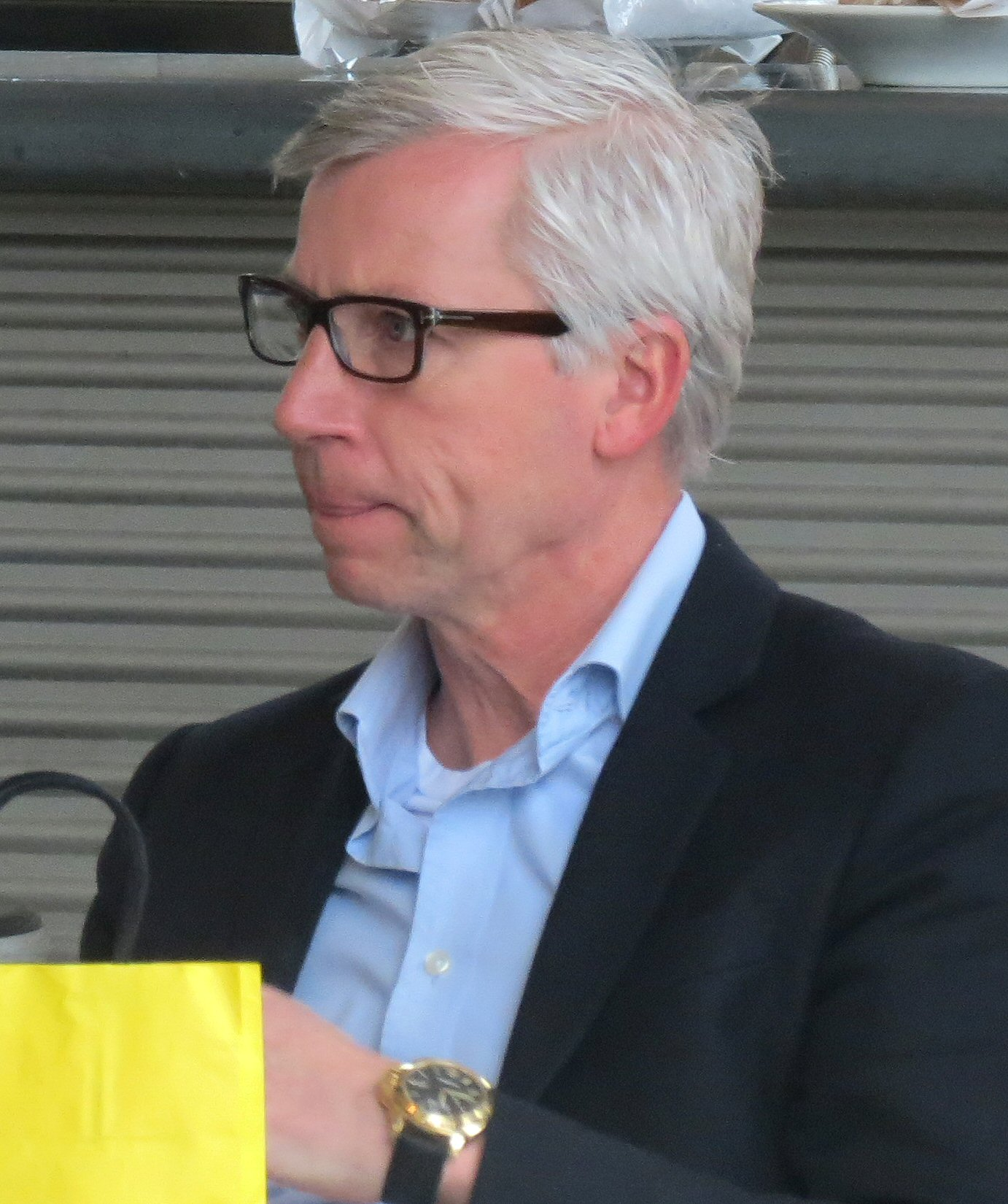
Alan Pardew was manager for the first half of Newcastle United's season until being appointed as Crystal Palace manager.

=== Coaching staff ===
Position	Staff
Manager	(England) Alan Pardew (until 2 January 2015)
Caretaker Manager	(England) John Carver (from 29 December 2014)
Head Coach	(England) John Carver (until end of season)
Assistant Manager	(England) John Carver (until 29 December 2014)
First-team coach	(England) Steve Stone
First Team Goalkeeping Coach	(England) Andy Woodman
Head of Fitness	(England) Dave Billows
First Team Fitness Coach	(England) Simon Tweddle
Strength and Conditioning Coach	(England) Chris Wilding
Club Doctor	(England) Paul Catterson
Head of Physiotherapy	(England) Derek Wright
First Team Physiotherapist	(England) Michael Harding
First Team Physiotherapist	(England) Carl Nelson
First Team Analyst	(England) Kerry Morrow
Chief Scout	(England) Graham Carr

Last updated: 29 January 2015
Source: First Team

== Statistics ==
=== Appearances and goals ===
Last updated on 24 May 2015.

No.	Pos	Nat	Player	Total		Premier League		FA Cup		League Cup	
No.	Pos	Nat	Player	Apps	Goals	Apps	Goals	Apps	Goals	Apps	Goals
Goalkeepers
1	GK	(Netherlands) NED	Tim Krul	31	0	30	0	0	0	1	0
21	GK	(Republic of Ireland) IRL	Rob Elliot	5	0	3	0	0	0	2	0
31	GK	(England) ENG	Jak Alnwick	8	0	5+1	0	1	0	1	0
Defenders
2	DF	(Argentina) ARG	Fabricio Coloccini	36	1	32	1	0	0	4	0
4	DF	(England) ENG	Ryan Taylor	15	0	11+3	0	0	0	1	0
6	DF	(England) ENG	Mike Williamson	33	1	27+4	1	1	0	1	0
19	DF	(France) FRA	Massadio Haïdara	20	0	12+3	0	1	0	3+1	0
22	DF	(Netherlands) NED	Daryl Janmaat	40	1	37	1	0	0	3	0
27	DF	(England) ENG	Steven Taylor	12	1	7+3	1	0	0	2	0
36	DF	(Wales) WAL	Paul Dummett	29	1	24+1	0	1	0	3	1
37	DF	(Slovakia) SVK	Ľubomír Šatka	1	0	0	0	0+1	0	0	0
Midfielders
7	MF	(France) FRA	Moussa Sissoko	38	5	34	4	0	0	2+2	1
8	MF	(Netherlands) NED	Vurnon Anita	21	0	17+2	0	1	0	0+1	0
10	MF	(Netherlands) NED	Siem de Jong	5	1	1+3	1	0	0	1	0
11	MF	(France) FRA	Yoan Gouffran	33	2	24+7	2	0	0	1+1	0
14	MF	(England) ENG	Jack Colback	38	4	35	4	0	0	3	0
16	MF	(England) ENG	Rolando Aarons	6	2	0+4	1	0	0	2	1
18	MF	(Argentina) ARG	Jonás Gutiérrez	10	1	6+4	1	0	0	0	0
20	MF	(France) FRA	Rémy Cabella	34	1	21+10	1	1	0	1+1	0
24	MF	(Ivory Coast) CIV	Cheick Tioté	12	0	10+1	0	1	0	0	0
25	MF	(France) FRA	Gabriel Obertan	16	1	8+5	1	0	0	3	0
28	MF	(Nigeria) NGR	Sammy Ameobi	27	2	15+10	2	0	0	1+1	0
30	MF	(Algeria) ALG	Mehdi Abeid	16	0	7+6	0	0	0	3	0
44	MF	(England) ENG	Callum Roberts	1	0	0	0	0+1	0	0	0
Forwards
9	FW	(Senegal) SEN	Papiss Cissé	22	11	11+11	11	0	0	0	0
17	FW	(Spain) ESP	Ayoze Pérez	39	7	25+11	7	0	0	1+2	0
29	FW	(France) FRA	Emmanuel Rivière	28	3	15+8	1	1	0	3+1	2
32	FW	(England) ENG	Adam Armstrong	15	0	1+10	0	1	0	2+1	0
Players currently out on loan:
3	DF	(Italy) ITA	Davide Santon	1	0	0	0	1	0	0	0
23	MF	(Slovenia) SLO	Haris Vučkić	3	0	0+1	0	1	0	0+1	0

=== Goals ===
Last updated on 24 May 2015.

Place	Position	Nation	Number	Name	Premier League	FA Cup	League Cup	Total
1	FW	(Senegal)	9	Papiss Cissé	11	0	0	11
2	FW	(Spain)	17	Ayoze Pérez	7	0	0	7
3	MF	(France)	7	Moussa Sissoko	4	0	1	5
4	MF	(England)	14	Jack Colback	4	0	0	4
5	FW	(France)	29	Emmanuel Rivière	1	0	2	3
6	FW	(France)	11	Yoan Gouffran	2	0	0	2
6	MF	(England)	16	Rolando Aarons	1	0	1	2
6	FW	(Nigeria)	28	Sammy Ameobi	2	0	0	2
9	DF	(Argentina)	2	Fabricio Coloccini	1	0	0	1
9	DF	(England)	6	Mike Williamson	1	0	0	1
9	MF	(Netherlands)	10	Siem de Jong	1	0	0	1
9	MF	(Argentina)	18	Jonás Gutiérrez	1	0	0	1
9	MF	(France)	20	Rémy Cabella	1	0	0	1
9	DF	(Netherlands)	22	Daryl Janmaat	1	0	0	1
9	FW	(France)	25	Gabriel Obertan	1	0	0	1
9	DF	(England)	27	Steven Taylor	1	0	0	1
9	DF	(Wales)	36	Paul Dummett	0	0	1	1
#	Own goals				0	0	1	1
TOTALS					40	0	6	46

=== Cards ===
Accounts for all competitions. Last updated on 24 May 2015.

No.	Pos.	Name	Yellow card	Red card
1	GK	(Netherlands) Tim Krul	1	0
2	DF	(Argentina) Fabricio Coloccini	3	1
4	DF	(England) Ryan Taylor	3	0
6	DF	(England) Mike Williamson	5	2
7	MF	(France) Moussa Sissoko	7	2
8	MF	(Netherlands) Vurnon Anita	3	0
9	ST	(Senegal) Papiss Cissé	1	0
11	ST	(France) Yoan Gouffran	3	0
14	MF	(England) Jack Colback	12	0
16	MF	(England) Rolando Aarons	1	0
18	MF	(Argentina) Jonás Gutiérrez	4	0
19	DF	(France) Massadio Haïdara	3	0
20	MF	(France) Rémy Cabella	2	0
21	GK	(Republic of Ireland) Rob Elliot	1	0
22	DF	(Netherlands) Daryl Janmaat	7	1
24	MF	(Ivory Coast) Cheick Tioté	6	0
27	DF	(England) Steven Taylor	2	1
28	FW	(England) Sammy Ameobi	2	0
30	MF	(Algeria) Mehdi Abeid	0	1
32	FW	(England) Adam Armstrong	1	0
36	DF	(Wales) Paul Dummett	3	0
37	DF	(Slovakia) Ľubomír Šatka	1	0

=== Captains ===
Accounts for all competitions. Last updated on 24 May 2015.

No.	Pos.	Name	Starts
2	DF	(Argentina) Fabricio Coloccini	35
7	MF	(France) Moussa Sissoko	5
24	MF	(Ivory Coast) Cheick Tioté	1
10	MF	(Netherlands) Siem de Jong	0

== Players ==
=== First team squad ===
No.	Name	Nationality	Position (s)	Date of birth (age)	Signed	Signed from	Signing fee
Goalkeepers
1	Tim Krul	(Netherlands)	GK	3 April 1988 (aged 27)	2006	(Netherlands) ADO Den Haag	Free
21	Rob Elliot	(Republic of Ireland)	GK	30 April 1986 (aged 29)	2011	(England) Charlton Athletic	£0.3M
31	Jak Alnwick	(England)	GK	17 June 1993 (aged 22)	2008	(England) Sunderland	Free
41	Freddie Woodman	(England)	GK	4 March 1997 (aged 18)	2011	(England) Crystal Palace	Free
Defenders
2	Fabricio Coloccini	(Argentina)	CB	22 January 1982 (aged 33)	2008	(Spain) Deportivo La Coruña	£10.3M
3	Davide Santon	(Italy)	LB / RB	2 January 1991 (aged 24)	2011	(Italy) Internazionale	£5.3M
4	Ryan Taylor	(England)	RB / RM / LB	19 August 1984 (aged 30)	2009	(England) Wigan Athletic	Part-exchange
6	Mike Williamson	(England)	CB	8 November 1983 (aged 31)	2010	(England) Portsmouth	£2M
19	Massadio Haïdara	(France)	LB	2 December 1992 (aged 22)	2013	(France) Nancy	£2M
22	Daryl Janmaat	(Netherlands)	RB	22 July 1989 (aged 26)	2014	(Netherlands) Feyenoord	£5M
27	Steven Taylor	(England)	CB / RB	23 January 1986 (aged 29)	2003	(England) Newcastle United Academy	Free
33	Curtis Good	(Australia)	CB / LB	23 March 1993 (aged 22)	2012	(Australia) Melbourne Heart	£0.3M
34	Remie Streete	(England)	CB	19 April 1995 (aged 20)	2006	(England) Newcastle United Academy	Free
36	Paul Dummett	(Wales)	LB / CB	26 September 1991 (aged 23)	2009	(England) Newcastle United Academy	Free
37	Ľubomír Šatka	(Slovakia)	CB	2 December 1995 (aged 19)	2012	(Slovakia) Dubnica	Free
39	Shane Ferguson	(Northern Ireland)	LB / LM	12 July 1991 (aged 24)	2007	(England) Newcastle United Academy	Free
42	Kevin Mbabu	(Switzerland)	CB	19 April 1995 (aged 20)	2013	(Switzerland) Servette	£1M
Midfielders
7	Moussa Sissoko	(France)	CM / AM / RW	16 August 1989 (aged 26)	2013	(France) Toulouse	£1.8M
8	Vurnon Anita	(Netherlands)	DM / RB	4 April 1989 (aged 26)	2012	(Netherlands) Ajax	£6.7M
10	Siem de Jong	(Netherlands)	AM / SS	28 January 1989 (aged 26)	2014	(Netherlands) Ajax	£7.5M
14	Jack Colback	(England)	CM	24 October 1989 (aged 25)	2014	(England) Sunderland	Free
16	Rolando Aarons	(England)	LW	16 November 1995 (aged 19)	2012	(England) Bristol City	Free
18	Jonás Gutiérrez	(Argentina)	LW / RW	5 July 1983 (aged 32)	2008	(Spain) Mallorca	£2M
20	Rémy Cabella	(France)	AM / RW / LW	8 March 1990 (aged 25)	2014	(France) Montpellier	£8M
23	Haris Vučkić	(Slovenia)	AM / SS	21 August 1992 (aged 22)	2009	(Slovenia) Domžale	£0.5M
24	Cheick Tioté	(Ivory Coast)	DM	21 June 1986 (aged 29)	2010	(Netherlands) Twente	£3.5M
25	Gabriel Obertan	(France)	RW / LW	26 February 1989 (aged 26)	2011	(England) Manchester United	£3M
30	Mehdi Abeid	(Algeria)	AM	6 August 1992 (aged 23)	2011	(France) Lens	Free
38	Gaël Bigirimana	(England)	DM	22 October 1993 (aged 21)	2012	(England) Coventry City	£1M
40	Olivier Kemen	(France)	DM	20 July 1996 (aged 19)	2013	(France) Metz	£0.35M
Forwards
9	Papiss Cissé	(Senegal)	ST	3 June 1985 (aged 30)	2012	(Germany) Freiburg	£9M
11	Yoan Gouffran	(France)	ST / LW	25 May 1986 (aged 29)	2013	(France) Bordeaux	£0.5M
15	Facundo Ferreyra	(Argentina)	ST	14 March 1991 (aged 24)	2014	(Ukraine) Shakhtar Donetsk	Loan
17	Ayoze Pérez	(Spain)	ST	29 July 1993 (aged 22)	2014	(Spain) Tenerife	£1.6M
28	Sammy Ameobi	(Nigeria)	ST / LW / RW	1 May 1992 (aged 23)	2008	(England) Newcastle United Academy	Free
29	Emmanuel Rivière	(France)	ST	3 March 1990 (aged 25)	2014	(France) Monaco	£6.3M
32	Adam Armstrong	(England)	ST	10 February 1997 (aged 18)	2014	(England) Newcastle United Academy	Free
35	Adam Campbell	(England)	ST	1 January 1995 (aged 20)	2005	(England) Newcastle United Academy	Free
43	Alex Gilliead	(England)	FW	11 February 1996 (aged 19)	2011	(England) Swalwell Juniors	Free
44	Callum Roberts	(England)	MF	14 April 1997 (aged 18)	2005	(England) Whitley Bay	Free

=== Reserve team ===
The following players made most of their appearances for the reserve team this season, but may have also appeared for the under-18s.

Note: Flags indicate national team as defined under FIFA eligibility rules; some limited exceptions apply. Players may hold more than one non-FIFA nationality.

No.	Pos.	Nation	Player
—	GK	ENG	Paul Woolston
—	DF	ENG	Macaulay Gillesphey
—	DF	ENG	Ryan McKinnon
—	DF	ENG	Ben Pollock
—	DF	ENG	Jamie Sterry
—	DF	ENG	Callum Williams

No.	Pos.	Nation	Player
—	MF	ENG	Greg Olley
—	MF	ENG	Liam Smith
—	MF	TUR	Daniel Barlaser
—	FW	ENG	Tom Heardman
—	FW	ENG	Jonathyn Quinn

=== Under-18 team ===
The following players made most of their appearances for the under-18 team this season, but may have also appeared for the reserves.

Note: Flags indicate national team as defined under FIFA eligibility rules; some limited exceptions apply. Players may hold more than one non-FIFA nationality.

No.	Pos.	Nation	Player
—	GK	ENG	George Dorrington (on loan from Manchester United)
—	GK	ENG	Nathan Harker
—	GK	ENG	Brendan Pearson
—	GK	ENG	Carl Robinson
—	GK	ENG	Ben Smith
—	DF	ENG	James Atkinson
—	DF	ENG	Owen Bailey
—	DF	ENG	Jamie Cobain
—	DF	ENG	Liam Gibson
—	DF	ENG	Adam Laidler
—	DF	ENG	Craig Spooner
—	DF	ENG	Lewis Suddick
—	DF	ENG	Jake Trodd
—	DF	SCO	Kyle Cameron
—	DF	NIR	Michael Newberry
—	MF	ENG	Liam Bell
—	MF	ENG	Stefan Broccoli
—	MF	ENG	Ben Drennan
—	MF	ENG	Mackenzie Heaney

No.	Pos.	Nation	Player
—	MF	ENG	Jack Hunter
—	MF	ENG	Sean Longstaff
—	MF	ENG	Dan Lowther
—	MF	ENG	Callum Smith
—	MF	ENG	Jordan Storey
—	MF	ENG	Dan Ward
—	FW	ENG	Luke Charman
—	FW	ENG	Andy Hall
—	FW	ENG	Jamie Holmes
—	FW	ENG	Louis Johnson
—	FW	ENG	Joe Kerridge
—	FW	ENG	Lewis McNall
—	FW	SCO	Owen Gallacher
—		ENG	Tayshan Hayden-Smith
—		ENG	Liam Tatters
—	GK		Cameron Armstrong
—	GK		Kieran Stoker
—	GK		Owen Wheeler (on loan from Liverpool)
—			Shane Donaghey

== Player movements ==
=== Transfers in ===
Date	Pos.	Name	From	Fee	Source
6 June 2014	FW	(Spain) Ayoze Pérez	(Spain) Tenerife	£1.6M	
9 June 2014	MF	(England) Jack Colback	(England) Sunderland	Free	
2 July 2014	MF	(Netherlands) Siem de Jong	(Netherlands) Ajax	£6M	
13 July 2014	MF	(France) Rémy Cabella	(France) Montpellier	£8M	
16 July 2014	FW	(France) Emmanuel Rivière	(France) Monaco	£6.3M	
17 July 2014	DF	(Netherlands) Daryl Janmaat	(Netherlands) Feyenoord	£5M	
9 August 2014	GK	(England) Karl Darlow	(England) Nottingham Forest	£3M	
9 August 2014	DF	(England) Jamaal Lascelles	(England) Nottingham Forest	£4M	

- Total spending: ▼ ~ £35.4M

=== Transfers out ===
Date	Pos.	Name	To	Fee	Source
16 May 2014	MF	(England) Dan Gosling	(England) Bournemouth	Free	
23 May 2014	FW	(Nigeria) Shola Ameobi	(Turkey) Gaziantep B.B.	Free	
23 May 2014	MF	(Scotland) Steven Logan	(Scotland) Annan Athletic	Free	
23 May 2014	MF	(Republic of Ireland) Brandon Miele	(Northern Ireland) Glebe Rangers	Free	
23 May 2014	GK	(England) Jonathan Mitchell	(England) Derby County	Free	
23 May 2014	MF	(England) Conor Newton	(England) Rotherham United	Free	
23 May 2014	MF	(England) Michael Richardson	(England) Blyth Spartans	Free	
28 June 2014	DF	(England) James Tavernier	(England) Wigan Athletic	£400K	
1 July 2014	MF	(France) Romain Amalfitano	(France) Dijon	Free	
17 July 2014	DF	(France) Mathieu Debuchy	(England) Arsenal	£12M	
4 January 2015	MF	(France) Hatem Ben Arfa	(France) Nice	Free	
27 January 2015	DF	(France) Mapou Yanga-Mbiwa	(Italy) Roma	£4.8M	
29 May 2015	GK	(England) Jak Alnwick	Released	Free	
29 May 2015	FW	(England) Adam Campbell	Released	Free	
29 May 2015	MF	(Argentina) Jonás Gutiérrez	Released	Free	
29 May 2015	DF	(England) Remie Streete	Released	Free	
29 May 2015	DF	(England) Ryan Taylor	Released	Free	

- Total income: ▲ ~ £17.2M

=== Loans in ===
Date	Pos.	Name	From	Expiry	Source
3 August 2014	FW	(Argentina) Facundo Ferreyra	(Ukraine) Shakhtar Donetsk	30 June 2015	

=== Loans out ===
Date	Pos.	Name	To	Expiry	Source
22 July 2014	MF	(France) Sylvain Marveaux	(France) Guingamp	30 June 2015	
7 August 2014	FW	(England) Adam Campbell	(England) Fleetwood Town	4 September 2014	
9 August 2014	GK	(England) Karl Darlow	(England) Nottingham Forest	30 June 2015	
9 August 2014	DF	(England) Jamaal Lascelles	(England) Nottingham Forest	30 June 2015	
1 September 2014	DF	(France) Mapou Yanga-Mbiwa	(Italy) Roma	30 June 2015	
2 September 2014	MF	(France) Hatem Ben Arfa	(England) Hull City	1 January 2015	
16 September 2014	GK	(England) Freddie Woodman	(England) Hartlepool United	21 October 2014	
9 October 2014	DF	(England) Remie Streete	(England) Port Vale	12 November 2014	
21 November 2014	FW	(England) Adam Campbell	(England) Hartlepool United	20 December 2014	
3 January 2015	MF	(France) Hatem Ben Arfa	(France) Nice	30 June 2015	
16 January 2015	FW	(England) Callum Roberts	(England) Gateshead	14 February 2015	
16 January 2015	FW	(England) Adam Campbell	(England) Gateshead	30 June 2015	
2 February 2015	DF	(Italy) Davide Santon	(Italy) Inter Milan	30 June 2015	
2 February 2015	MF	(England) Gaël Bigirimana	(Scotland) Rangers	30 June 2015	
2 February 2015	DF	(Switzerland) Kevin Mbabu	(Scotland) Rangers	30 June 2015	
2 February 2015	DF	(Northern Ireland) Shane Ferguson	(Scotland) Rangers	30 June 2015	
2 February 2015	DF	(England) Remie Streete	(Scotland) Rangers	30 June 2015	
2 February 2015	MF	(Slovenia) Haris Vučkić	(Scotland) Rangers	30 June 2015	
13 March 2015	GK	(England) Jak Alnwick	(England) Bradford City	30 June 2015	

== Pre-season and friendlies ==
15 July 2014	Oldham Athletic	2–1	Newcastle United	Oldham, England
19:30 BST	Dieng 68'; Gros 78'	Report	De Jong 14'	Stadium: Boundary Park; Attendance: 2,919; Referee: Darren Bond

22 July 2014 2014 Football United Tour	Sydney	0–4	Newcastle United	Dunedin, New Zealand
08:30 BST		Report	De Jong 19'; Rivière 26'; Yanga-Mbiwa 33'; Armstrong 82'	Stadium: Forsyth Barr Stadium; Attendance: 9,506; Referee: Campbell-Kirk Waugh

26 July 2014 2014 Football United Tour	Wellington Phoenix	0–1	Newcastle United	Wellington, New Zealand
05:50 BST		Report	Gouffran 41'	Stadium: Westpac Stadium; Attendance: 30,968; Referee: Matthew Conger

30 July 2014	Sheffield Wednesday	0–1	Newcastle United	Sheffield, England
19:45 BST		Report	Ayoze 65'	Stadium: Hillsborough Stadium; Attendance: 10,173; Referee: Mark Brown

2 August 2014 2014 Schalke 04 Cup	Málaga	3–1	Newcastle United	Gelsenkirchen, Germany
14:30 BST	Darder 25'; Castillejo 32', 43'	Report	Obertan 60'	Stadium: Veltins-Arena; Referee: Christian Bandurski

3 August 2014 2014 Schalke 04 Cup	Schalke 04	1–3	Newcastle United	Gelsenkirchen, Germany
16:45 BST	Avdijaj 90'	Report	Rivière 18'; Aarons 54'; Cabella 72'	Stadium: Veltins-Arena; Referee: Thorsten Kinhofer

5 August 2014	Huddersfield Town	2–2	Newcastle United	Huddersfield, England
19:45 BST	Majewski 36'; Stead 66'	Report	Rivière 16'; Cabella 88'	Stadium: John Smith's Stadium; Attendance: 5,896; Referee: Andy Madley (West Yorkshire)

10 August 2014	Newcastle United	1–0	Real Sociedad	Newcastle, England
13:30 BST	Sissoko 88'	Report		Stadium: St James' Park; Attendance: 19,188; Referee: Chris Foy (Lancashire)

== Competitions ==
Win Draw Loss

=== Overall ===
Competition	Started round	Current position / round	Final position / round	First match	Last match
Premier League	—	—	15th	17 August 2014	24 May 2015
League Cup	Second round	—	Fifth round	26 August 2014	17 December 2014
FA Cup	Third round	—	Third round	3 January 2015	3 January 2015

Updated to match played 31 January 2015
Source: Competitions

=== Premier League ===
==== League table ====
Pos	Team	Pld	W	D	L	GF	GA	GD	Pts
13	West Bromwich Albion	38	11	11	16	38	51	−13	44
14	Leicester City	38	11	8	19	46	55	−9	41
15	Newcastle United	38	10	9	19	40	63	−23	39
16	Sunderland	38	7	17	14	31	53	−22	38
17	Aston Villa	38	10	8	20	31	57	−26	38

Source: Barclays Premier League
Rules for classification: 1) Points; 2) Goal difference; 3) Goals scored; 4) Play-offs (only if needed to decide champion, teams for relegation or teams for UEFA competitions).

==== Results by matchday ====
Matchday	1	2	3	4	5	6	7	8	9	10	11	12	13	14	15	16	17	18	19	20	21	22	23	24	25	26	27	28	29	30	31	32	33	34	35	36	37	38
Ground	H	A	H	A	H	A	A	H	A	H	A	H	A	A	H	A	H	A	H	H	A	H	A	H	A	A	H	H	A	H	A	A	H	H	A	H	A	H
Result	L	D	D	L	D	L	D	W	W	W	W	W	L	D	W	L	L	L	W	D	L	L	W	D	D	L	W	L	L	L	L	L	L	L	L	D	L	W
Position	20	15	15	20	18	19	18	18	14	11	8	5	8	9	7	7	9	10	9	10	10	11	11	11	11	11	11	11	11	12	13	13	14	14	15	17	17	15

Source: Statto.com
A = Away; H = Home; W = Win; D = Draw; L = Loss

==== Matches ====
The fixtures for the 2014–15 season were announced on 18 June 2014 at 9am.

17 August 2014 1	Newcastle United	0–2	Manchester City	Newcastle upon Tyne
16:00		Report	Silva 38'; Agüero 90+2'	Stadium: St James' Park; Attendance: 50,816; Referee: Martin Atkinson

23 August 2014 2	Aston Villa	0–0	Newcastle United	Birmingham
12:45		Report	Williamson (yellow card) 86' (yellow-red card) 90+1'	Stadium: Villa Park; Attendance: 30,267; Referee: Mike Dean

30 August 2014 3	Newcastle United	3–3	Crystal Palace	Newcastle upon Tyne
15:00	Janmaat 37'; Aarons 73'; Williamson 88'	Report	Gayle 1'; Puncheon 48'; Zaha 90+5'	Stadium: St James' Park; Attendance: 49,226 (1,450 away); Referee: Mike Jones

13 September 2014 4	Southampton	4–0	Newcastle United	Southampton
15:00	Pellè 6', 19'; Cork 54'; Schneiderlin 90+4'	Report		Stadium: St Mary's Stadium; Attendance: 29,678; Referee: Chris Foy

20 September 2014 5	Newcastle United	2–2	Hull City	Newcastle upon Tyne
15:00	Cissé 74', 87'	Report	Jelavić 49'; Diamé 68'	Stadium: St James' Park; Attendance: 49,119; Referee: Neil Swarbrick

29 September 2014 6	Stoke City	1–0	Newcastle United	Stoke-on-Trent
20:00	Crouch 15'	Report		Stadium: Britannia Stadium; Attendance: 26,332; Referee: Craig Pawson

4 October 2014 7	Swansea City	2–2	Newcastle United	Swansea
15:00	Bony 17'; Routledge 50'	Report	Cissé 43', 75'	Stadium: Liberty Stadium; Attendance: 20,622 (1,054 away); Referee: Lee Mason

18 October 2014 8	Newcastle United	1–0	Leicester City	Newcastle upon Tyne
16:00	Obertan 71'	Report		Stadium: St James' Park; Attendance: 51,886; Referee: Martin Atkinson

26 October 2014 9	Tottenham Hotspur	1–2	Newcastle United	London
13:30	Adebayor 18'	Report	Ameobi 46'; Ayoze 58'	Stadium: White Hart Lane; Attendance: 35,650; Referee: Anthony Taylor

1 November 2014 10	Newcastle United	1–0	Liverpool	Newcastle upon Tyne
12:45	Ayoze 73'	Report		Stadium: St James' Park; Attendance: 52,166; Referee: Andre Marriner

9 November 2014 11	West Bromwich Albion	0–2	Newcastle United	Birmingham
13:30		Report	Ayoze 45'; Coloccini 62'	Stadium: The Hawthorns; Attendance: 26,476; Referee: Craig Pawson

22 November 2014 12	Newcastle United	1–0	Queens Park Rangers	Newcastle upon Tyne
15:00	Sissoko 78'	Report		Stadium: St James' Park; Attendance: 51,915; Referee: Chris Foy

29 November 2014 13	West Ham United	1–0	Newcastle United	London
15:00	Cresswell 56'	Report	Sissoko (yellow card) 75' (yellow-red card) 76'	Stadium: Upton Park; Attendance: 34,977 (3,008 away); Referee: Mike Dean

2 December 2014 14	Burnley	1–1	Newcastle United	Burnley
19:45	Boyd 34'	Report	Cissé 48'	Stadium: Turf Moor; Attendance: 18,791; Referee: Phil Dowd

6 December 2014 15	Newcastle United	2–1	Chelsea	Newcastle upon Tyne
12:45	Cissé 57', 79'; S. Taylor (yellow card) 56' (yellow-red card) 81'	Report	Drogba 83'	Stadium: St James' Park; Attendance: 52,019; Referee: Martin Atkinson

13 December 2014 16	Arsenal	4–1	Newcastle United	London
17:30	Giroud 15', 58'; Cazorla 54', 89' (pen.)	Report	Ayoze 63'	Stadium: Emirates Stadium; Attendance: 59,949 (2,000 away); Referee: Lee Mason

21 December 2014 17	Newcastle United	0–1	Sunderland	Newcastle upon Tyne
13:30		Report	Johnson 90'	Stadium: St James' Park; Attendance: 52,315; Referee: Anthony Taylor

26 December 2014 18	Manchester United	3–1	Newcastle United	Manchester
15:00	Rooney 23', 36'; Van Persie 53'	Report	Cissé 87' (pen.)	Stadium: Old Trafford; Attendance: 75,318 (3,015 away); Referee: Mike Dean

28 December 2014 19	Newcastle United	3–2	Everton	Newcastle upon Tyne
16:15	Cissé 34'; Ayoze 51'; Colback 68'	Report	Koné 5'; Mirallas 84'	Stadium: St James' Park; Attendance: 52,313; Referee: Craig Pawson

1 January 2015 20	Newcastle United	3–3	Burnley	Newcastle upon Tyne
15:00	S. Taylor 15'; Colback 26'; Sissoko 78'	Report	Dummett 19' (o.g.); Ings 66'; Boyd 86'	Stadium: St James' Park; Attendance: 51,761; Referee: Mike Dean

10 January 2015 21	Chelsea	2–0	Newcastle United	London
15:00	Oscar 43'; Costa 59'	Report		Stadium: Stamford Bridge; Attendance: 41,612 (2,230 away); Referee: Roger East

17 January 2015 22	Newcastle United	1–2	Southampton	Newcastle upon Tyne
17:30	Gouffran 29'	Report	Elia 14', 62'	Stadium: St James' Park; Attendance: 49,307; Referee: Robert Madley

31 January 2015 23	Hull City	0–3	Newcastle United	Hull
12:45		Report	Cabella 40'; Ameobi 50'; Gouffran 78'	Stadium: KC Stadium; Attendance: 23,925; Referee: Phil Dowd

8 February 2015 24	Newcastle United	1–1	Stoke City	Newcastle upon Tyne
14:05	Colback 74'	Report	Crouch 90'	Stadium: St James' Park; Attendance: 47,763; Referee: Kevin Friend

11 February 2015 25	Crystal Palace	1–1	Newcastle United	London
20:00	Campbell 71'	Report	Cissé 42'	Stadium: Selhurst Park; Attendance: 25,118; Referee: Andre Marriner

21 February 2015 26	Manchester City	5–0	Newcastle United	Manchester
17:30	Agüero 2' (pen.); Nasri 12'; Džeko 21'; Silva 51', 53'	Report		Stadium: City of Manchester Stadium; Attendance: 45,602; Referee: Chris Foy

28 February 2015 27	Newcastle United	1–0	Aston Villa	Newcastle upon Tyne
15:00	Cissé 37'	Report		Stadium: St James' Park; Attendance: 51,573; Referee: Lee Mason

4 March 2015 28	Newcastle United	0–1	Manchester United	Newcastle upon Tyne
19:45		Report	Young 89'	Stadium: St James' Park; Attendance: 49,801; Referee: Anthony Taylor

15 March 2015 29	Everton	3–0	Newcastle United	Liverpool
16:00	McCarthy 20'; Lukaku 56' (pen.); Barkley 90+3'	Report	Coloccini (red card) 59'	Stadium: Goodison Park; Attendance: 38,806; Referee: Martin Atkinson

21 March 2015 30	Newcastle United	1–2	Arsenal	Newcastle upon Tyne
15:00	Sissoko 48'	Report	Giroud 24', 28'	Stadium: St James' Park; Attendance: 50,544; Referee: Mike Jones

5 April 2015 31	Sunderland	1–0	Newcastle United	Sunderland
16:00 BST	Defoe 45+1'	Report		Stadium: Stadium of Light; Attendance: 47,563; Referee: Mike Dean

13 April 2015 32	Liverpool	2–0	Newcastle United	Liverpool
20:00 BST	Sterling 9'; Allen 70'	Report	Sissoko (yellow card) 78' (yellow-red card) 83'	Stadium: Anfield; Attendance: 44,611; Referee: Lee Mason

19 April 2015 33	Newcastle United	1–3	Tottenham Hotspur	Newcastle upon Tyne
16:00 BST	Colback 46'	Report	Chadli 30'; Eriksen 53'; Kane 90'	Stadium: St James' Park; Attendance: 47,427; Referee: Kevin Friend

25 April 2015 34	Newcastle United	2–3	Swansea City	Newcastle upon Tyne
15:00	Ayoze 20'; De Jong 87'	Report	Oliveira 45+2'; Sigurðsson 49'; Cork 71'	Stadium: St James' Park; Attendance: 46,884; Referee: Neil Swarbrick

2 May 2015 35	Leicester City	3–0	Newcastle United	Leicester
12:45 BST	Ulloa 1', 48' (pen.); Morgan 17'	Report	Janmaat (yellow card) 16' (yellow-red card) 90+1'; Williamson (yellow card) 55' (yellow-red card) 62'	Stadium: King Power Stadium; Attendance: 31,576; Referee: Mike Dean

9 May 2015 36	Newcastle United	1–1	West Bromwich Albion	Newcastle upon Tyne
15:00 BST	Ayoze 41'	Report	Anichebe 32'	Stadium: St James' Park; Attendance: 47,894; Referee: Chris Foy

16 May 2015 37	Queens Park Rangers	2–1	Newcastle United	London
15:00 BST	Phillips 54'; Fer 61'	Report	Rivière 24'	Stadium: Loftus Road; Attendance: 17,608; Referee: Lee Probert

24 May 2015 38	Newcastle United	2–0	West Ham United	Newcastle upon Tyne
15:00 BST	Sissoko 54'; Gutiérrez 85'	Report		Stadium: St James' Park; Attendance: 52,094; Referee: Martin Atkinson

=== FA Cup ===
3 January 2015 Third round	Leicester City	1–0	Newcastle United	Leicester
15:00	Ulloa 39'	Report		Stadium: King Power Stadium; Attendance: 23,212; Referee: Lee Mason

=== League Cup ===
26 August 2014 Second round	Gillingham	0–1	Newcastle United	Gillingham
19:45		Report	Egan 25' (o.g.)	Stadium: Priestfield Stadium; Referee: Oliver Langford

24 September 2014 Third round	Crystal Palace	2–3 (a.e.t.)	Newcastle United	London
20:00	Gayle 25' (pen.); Kaikai 90'	Report	Rivière 36', 48' (pen.); Abeid (yellow card) 90' (yellow-red card) 100'; Dummett 112'	Stadium: Selhurst Park; Attendance: 13,773; Referee: Robert Madley

29 October 2014 Fourth round	Manchester City	0–2	Newcastle United	Manchester
19:45		Report	Aarons 6'; Sissoko 76'	Stadium: City of Manchester Stadium; Attendance: 40,752; Referee: Stuart Attwell

17 December 2014 Quarter Final	Tottenham Hotspur	4–0	Newcastle United	London
19:45	Bentaleb 18'; Chadli 46'; Kane 65'; Soldado 70'	Report		Stadium: White Hart Lane; Attendance: 34,677
