= 2015–16 Newcastle United F.C. season =

Newcastle United
2015–16 season
- Owner: Mike Ashley
- Managing director: Lee Charnley
- Manager: Steve McClaren (Until 11 March 2016); Rafael Benítez (From 11 March 2016)
- Stadium: St James' Park
- Premier League: 18th (relegated)
- FA Cup: Third round
- League Cup: Third round
- Top goalscorer: League: Georginio Wijnaldum (11); All: Georginio Wijnaldum (11)
- Highest home attendance: 52,311 (v. Sunderland, Premier League, March 20, 2016)
- Lowest home attendance: 26,923 (v. Northampton, EFL Cup, August 25, 2015)
Home colours	Away colours	Third colours

The 2015–16 season was Newcastle United's sixth consecutive season in the Premier League and their 123rd year in existence. This season, Newcastle United participated in the Premier League, FA Cup and League Cup. The season covers the period from 1 July 2015 to 30 June 2016.

== Season overview ==
24 May 2015: Newcastle United guarantee participation in the 2015–16 Premier League by beating West Ham United 2–0 in the final match of the 2014–15 Premier League season.

4 June 2015: Newcastle United announce their pre-season schedule for 10 July to 1 August 2015, consisting of matches against near-neighbours Gateshead, a tour to the United States to face Mexican side Atlas and United Soccer League sides Sacramento Republic and Portland Timbers 2, as well as matches against Sheffield United, York City and German side Borussia Mönchengladbach upon returning to England.

10 June 2015: Newcastle United sack coaches John Carver and Steve Stone prior to the 2015–16 season. Former England manager Steve McClaren is appointed the club's new head coach on a three-year deal, with an option to extend to eight years. McClaren is also appointed to the Newcastle United Board of Directors, along with chief scout Graham Carr and club ambassador Bob Moncur. Mike Ashley and John Irving both step down from the Board of Directors, with managing director Lee Charnley the only person to remain on the Board.

17 June 2015: The fixture list for the 2015–16 Premier League is released. Newcastle United will start their season on 9 August 2015 with a home match against Southampton kicking off at 13:30.

1 July 2015: The club confirm Macaulay Gillesphey, Tom Heardman, Liam Smith and Jamie Sterry have signed their first pro contracts, Davide Santon joins Inter Milan for £2.8 million and Remie Streete joins Port Vale on a free transfer.

2 July 2015: Head Coach Steve McClaren confirms the arrival of new coaching staff members. Paul Simpson and Ian Cathro are appointed as assistant coaches, Alessandro Schoenmaker is appointed as a fitness coach and Steve Black joins in a consultancy role.

6 July 2015: Adam Campbell joins Notts County on a free transfer after being released by the club.

7 July 2015: Sammy Ameobi signs a two-year contract extension, committing him to the club until June 2017. He also joins Cardiff City on a season-long loan for the 2015–16 season.

11 July 2015: Georginio Wijnaldum joins the club from PSV for £14.5m on a 5-year contract.

21 July 2015: Newcastle United announce the signing of Serbian striker Aleksandar Mitrović from Belgian side Anderlecht on a five-year deal.

27 July 2015: Ryan Taylor joins Hull City on a free transfer after being released by the club.

28 July 2015: Adam Armstrong has joined Coventry City on a youth loan until 16 January 2016.

29 July 2015: Freddie Woodman has joined Crawley Town on a youth loan until 3 January 2016.

30 July 2015: Newcastle announce a signing Chancel Mbemba who has joined on a five-year deal.

31 July 2015: Newcastle announce their squad numbers for 2015–16 season and Andy Woodman leaves for Crystal Palace.

4 August 2015: Simon Smith is appointed as Newcastle United goalkeeping coach to replace Andy Woodman who went to Crystal Palace.

6 August 2015: Newcastle United sign Ivan Toney on a long-term deal from Northampton Town for an undisclosed fee. Former goalkeeper Jak Alnwick joins League One side Port Vale on a short-term deal. Fabricio Coloccini has signed a one-year extension to his contract which will keep him at St. James' Park until the end of the 2016/17 season, with the option of a further year.

7 August 2015: Shane Ferguson signs for Millwall on a 93-day emergency loan deal.

19 August 2015: Newcastle sign French winger Florian Thauvin from Marseille on a five-year deal, believed to be worth £12m. Rémy Cabella will go out on loan.

21 August 2015: Midfielder Mehdi Abeid joined Greek club Panathinaikos for an undisclosed fee.

1 September 2015: Olivier Kemen has joined Lyon on an undisclosed deal. Shane Ferguson extends his loan spell to 9 January 2016. Former Newcastle Midfielder Jonás Gutiérrez has signed for Deportivo La Coruña on a free transfer. Haris Vučkić joins Wigan Athletic on a season-long loan.

11 October 2015: Goalkeeper Freddie Woodman is recalled from Crawley Town as Tim Krul is out for the whole season with a knee injury.

29 October 2015: Mike Williamson has joined Wolverhampton Wanderers on a one-month loan deal.

10 November 2015: Ivan Toney has joined Barnsley on a youth loan deal.

17 November 2015: Gaël Bigirimana has returned to Coventry City on an emergency loan deal. Mike Williamson has extended his loan deal to 16 January 2016.

1 December 2015: Mike Williamson has been recalled from his loan deal due to Jamaal Lascelles injury.

8 December 2015: Ivan Toney has extended his loan deal to 9 January 2016.

23 December 2015: Ivan Toney was recalled from his loan deal due to Papiss Cissé injury.

5 January 2016: Gaël Bigirimana has extended his loan deal until 24 January.

11 January 2016: Newcastle have confirmed the signing of Henri Saivet on a five-and-a-half deal.

12 January 2016: Shane Ferguson extends his loan spell to 23 January 2016. Newcastle have confirmed the signing of Jonjo Shelvey on a five-and-a-half deal.

14 January 2016: Adam Armstrong and Gaël Bigirimana have both extended their loan deals until the End of Season.

26 January 2016: Shane Ferguson has made his loan deal to a permanent deal.

27 January 2016: Newcastle have confirmed the signing of Andros Townsend on a five-and-a-half deal.

29 January 2016: Mike Williamson rejoins Wolverhampton Wanderers on a permanent deal. Ľubomír Šatka joins York City on a one-month loan deal.

31 January 2016: Florian Thauvin has signed for Marseille until the End of Season.

1 February 2016: Newcastle have signed Seydou Doumbia on a loan deal until the End of Season.

29 February 2016: Ľubomír Šatka has extended his loan deal until the End of Season.

2 March 2016: Eleven players are given schoolboy contracts prior to the 2016–17 season: Thomas Allan, Kieren Aplin, Lewis Cass, Isaac Gamblin, Lewis Gibson, Matty Longstaff, Jack Robson, Kurtis Russell, Ollie Walters, Kelland Watts and Adam Wilson.

11 March 2016: Managing Director Lee Charnley announced that manager Steve McClaren had been sacked as Newcastle United manager. A few hours later Steve McClaren was replaced by Rafael Benítez. Fabio Pecchia, Francisco de Míguel Moreno and Antonio Gómez Pérez all joined as first-team coaches.

24 March 2016: Ivan Toney has rejoined Barnsley on a youth loan deal.

5 May 2016: Gabriel Obertan and Sylvain Marveaux left the club by mutual consent.

11 May 2016: Newcastle United were relegated to the Football League Championship as rivals Sunderland won 3–0 against Everton.

== Club ==
=== Coaching staff ===
The Newcastle United first team coaching staff for the 2015–16 season consists of the following:

==== First Team ====
Position	Staff
Manager	(Spain) Rafael Benítez
Assistant Coach	(Scotland) Ian Cathro
Assistant Coach	(Italy) Fabio Pecchia
Assistant Coach	(Spain) Antonio Gómez Pérez
Goalkeeping Coach	(England) Simon Smith
Strength and Conditioning Coach	(Spain) Francisco de Míguel Moreno
Strength and Conditioning Coach	(England) Chris Wilding
Club Doctor	(England) Paul Catterson
Head of Physiotherapy	(England) Derek Wright
Chief Scout	(England) Graham Carr

Last updated: 11 March 2016
Source: Coaching Staff

== Players ==
=== First team squad ===
No.	Name	Nationality	Position (s)	Date of birth (age)	Signed	Signed from	Signing fee
Goalkeepers
1	Tim Krul	(Netherlands)	GK	3 April 1988 (aged 28)	2006	(Netherlands) ADO Den Haag	Free
21	Rob Elliot	(Republic of Ireland)	GK	30 April 1986 (aged 30)	2011	(England) Charlton Athletic	£300k
26	Karl Darlow	(England)	GK	8 October 1990 (aged 25)	2014	(England) Nottingham Forest	£3m
41	Freddie Woodman	(England)	GK	4 March 1997 (aged 19)	2014	(England) Newcastle United Academy	Free
Defenders
2	Fabricio Coloccini	(Argentina)	CB	22 January 1982 (aged 34)	2008	(Spain) Deportivo de La Coruña	£10.3m
3	Paul Dummett	(Wales)	LB / CB	26 September 1991 (aged 24)	2010	(England) Newcastle United Academy	Free
15	Jamaal Lascelles	(England)	CB	11 November 1993 (aged 22)	2014	(England) Nottingham Forest	£4m
18	Chancel Mbemba	(Democratic Republic of the Congo)	CB	8 August 1994 (aged 22)	2015	(Belgium) Anderlecht	£8.5m
19	Massadio Haïdara	(France)	LB	2 December 1992 (aged 23)	2013	(France) Nancy	£2m
22	Daryl Janmaat	(Netherlands)	RB	22 July 1989 (aged 27)	2014	(Netherlands) Feyenoord	£5m
27	Steven Taylor	(England)	CB / RB	23 January 1986 (aged 30)	2003	(England) Newcastle United Academy	Free
33	Curtis Good	(Australia)	CB / LB	23 March 1993 (aged 23)	2012	(Australia) Melbourne Heart	£300k
35	Liam Gibson	(England)	LB	25 April 1997 (aged 19)	2016	(England) Newcastle United Academy	Free
37	Ľubomír Šatka	(Slovakia)	CB	2 December 1995 (aged 20)	2014	(England) Newcastle United Academy	Free
40	Callum Williams	(England)	CB	4 February 1997 (aged 19)	2016	(England) Newcastle United Academy	Free
42	Jamie Sterry	(England)	RB	21 November 1995 (aged 20)	2015	(England) Newcastle United Academy	Free
43	Kevin Mbabu	(Switzerland)	CB	19 April 1995 (aged 21)	2013	(Switzerland) Servette	£1m
Midfielders
4	Jack Colback	(England)	CM	24 October 1989 (aged 26)	2014	(England) Sunderland	Free
5	Georginio Wijnaldum	(Netherlands)	AM / RW	11 November 1990 (aged 25)	2015	(Netherlands) PSV	£14.5m
7	Moussa Sissoko	(France)	CM / AM / RW	16 August 1989 (aged 26)	2013	(France) Toulouse	£1.8m
8	Vurnon Anita	(Netherlands)	DM / RB	4 April 1989 (aged 27)	2012	(Netherlands) Ajax	£6.7m
10	Siem de Jong	(Netherlands)	AM / SS	28 January 1989 (aged 27)	2014	(Netherlands) Ajax	£7.5m
11	Yoan Gouffran	(France)	LW / ST	25 May 1986 (aged 30)	2013	(France) Bordeaux	£500k
12	Jonjo Shelvey	(England)	CM	27 February 1992 (aged 24)	2016	(Wales) Swansea City	£12m
16	Rolando Aarons	(England)	LW	16 November 1995 (aged 20)	2014	(England) Newcastle United Academy	Free
20	Florian Thauvin	(France)	RW / LW	26 January 1993 (aged 23)	2015	(France) Marseille	£12m
23	Henri Saivet	(Senegal)	LW / CM	26 October 1990 (aged 25)	2016	(France) Bordeaux	£5m
24	Cheick Tioté	(Ivory Coast)	DM	21 June 1986 (aged 30)	2010	(Netherlands) Twente	£3.5m
25	Andros Townsend	(England)	RW / LW	16 July 1991 (aged 25)	2016	(England) Tottenham Hotspur	£12m
35	Gaël Bigirimana	(England)	DM	22 October 1993 (aged 22)	2012	(England) Coventry City	£1m
47	Daniel Barlaser	(Turkey)	CM	18 January 1997 (aged 19)	2015	(England) Newcastle United Academy	Free
Forwards
9	Papiss Cissé	(Senegal)	ST	3 June 1985 (aged 31)	2012	(Germany) Freiburg	£9m
17	Ayoze Pérez	(Spain)	ST	29 July 1993 (aged 23)	2014	(Spain) Tenerife	£1.6m
28	Seydou Doumbia	(Ivory Coast)	ST	31 December 1987 (aged 28)	2016	(Italy) Roma	Loan
29	Emmanuel Rivière	(France)	ST	3 March 1990 (aged 26)	2014	(France) Monaco	£6.3m
32	Adam Armstrong	(England)	ST	10 February 1997 (aged 19)	2014	(England) Newcastle United Academy	Free
36	Ivan Toney	(England)	ST	16 March 1996 (aged 20)	2015	(England) Northampton Town	£500k
44	Callum Roberts	(England)	ST	14 April 1997 (aged 19)	2014	(England) Newcastle United Academy	Free
45	Aleksandar Mitrović	(Serbia)	ST	16 September 1994 (aged 21)	2015	(Belgium) Anderlecht	£13m

=== Reserve team ===
Note: Flags indicate national team as defined under FIFA eligibility rules; some limited exceptions apply. Players may hold more than one non-FIFA nationality.

No.	Pos.	Nation	Player
—	GK	ENG	Paul Woolston
—	DF	ENG	Macaulay Gillesphey
—	DF	ENG	Ben Cockup

No.	Pos.	Nation	Player
—	MF	ENG	Liam Smith
—	FW	ENG	Tom Heardman

=== Youth team ===
Note: Flags indicate national team as defined under FIFA eligibility rules; some limited exceptions apply. Players may hold more than one non-FIFA nationality.

No.	Pos.	Nation	Player
—	GK	ENG	Brendan Pearson
—	GK	ENG	Ben Smith
—	DF	ENG	Jamie Cobain
—	DF	ENG	Adam Laidler
—	DF	ENG	Lewis Suddick
—	DF	ENG	Jake Trodd
—	DF	SCO	Kyle Cameron
—	DF	NIR	Michael Newberry

No.	Pos.	Nation	Player
—	MF	ENG	Stefan Broccoli
—	MF	ENG	Shane Donaghey
—	MF	ENG	Jack Hunter
—	MF	ENG	Sean Longstaff
—	MF	ENG	Dan Ward
—	FW	ENG	Luke Charman
—	FW	ENG	Jamie Holmes
—	FW	ENG	Louis Johnson

== Transfers ==
=== In ===
Date from	Position	Name	From	Fee	Ref.
11 July 2015	MF	(Netherlands) Georginio Wijnaldum	(Netherlands) PSV	£14.5m	
21 July 2015	FW	(Serbia) Aleksandar Mitrović	(Belgium) Anderlecht	£13m	
30 July 2015	DF	(Democratic Republic of the Congo) Chancel Mbemba	(Belgium) Anderlecht	£8.5m	
6 August 2015	FW	(England) Ivan Toney	(England) Northampton Town	£500,000	
19 August 2015	MF	(France) Florian Thauvin	(France) Marseille	£12m	
11 January 2016	MF	(Senegal) Henri Saivet	(France) Bordeaux	£5m	
12 January 2016	MF	(England) Jonjo Shelvey	(Wales) Swansea City	£12m	
27 January 2016	MF	(England) Andros Townsend	(England) Tottenham Hotspur	£12.5m	

- Total spending: ▼£81.6m

==== Loans in ====
Date from	Position	Name	From	Expiry	Ref.
1 February 2016	FW	(Ivory Coast) Seydou Doumbia	(Italy) Roma	End of Season	

=== Out ===
Date from	Position	Name	To	Fee	Ref.
1 July 2015	DF	(Italy) Davide Santon	(Italy) Inter Milan	£2.8m	
1 July 2015	DF	(England) Remie Streete	(England) Port Vale	Free transfer	
6 July 2015	ST	(England) Adam Campbell	(England) Notts County	Free transfer	
27 July 2015	DF	(England) Ryan Taylor	(England) Hull City	Free transfer	
6 August 2015	GK	(England) Jak Alnwick	(England) Port Vale	Free transfer	
21 August 2015	MF	(Algeria) Mehdi Abeid	(Greece) Panathinaikos	£1.5m	
1 September 2015	MF	(France) Olivier Kemen	(France) Lyon	Undisclosed	
1 September 2015	MF	(Argentina) Jonás Gutiérrez	(Spain) Deportivo La Coruña	Free transfer	
26 January 2016	MF	(Northern Ireland) Shane Ferguson	(England) Millwall	Undisclosed	
29 January 2016	DF	(England) Mike Williamson	(England) Wolverhampton Wanderers	£250,000	
5 May 2016	MF	(France) Gabriel Obertan	Unattached	Free transfer	
5 May 2016	MF	(France) Sylvain Marveaux	Unattached	Free transfer	

- Total incoming: ▲ ~ £5.01m

==== Loans out ====
Date from	Position	Name	To	Expiry	Ref.
7 July 2015	MF	(Nigeria) Sammy Ameobi	(England) Cardiff City	End of Season	
28 July 2015	FW	(England) Adam Armstrong	(England) Coventry City	End of Season (Note: On 14 January 2016, Armstrong has extended his loan deal until the End of Season.)	
29 July 2015	GK	(England) Freddie Woodman	(England) Crawley Town	3 January 2016 (Note: On 11 October 2015, Woodman was recalled as Tim Krul is out for the whole season.)	
7 August 2015	DF	(Northern Ireland) Shane Ferguson	(England) Millwall	23 January 2016 (Note: On 1 September 2015, Ferguson's loan was extended until 9 January 2016.) (Note: On 12 January 2016, Ferguson's loan was extended until 23 January 2016.) (Note: On 26 January 2016, Ferguson's loan was changed into a permanent deal.)	
19 August 2015	MF	(France) Rémy Cabella	(France) Marseille	End of season	
1 September 2015	MF	(Slovenia) Haris Vučkić	(England) Wigan Athletic	End of Season	
29 October 2015	DF	(England) Mike Williamson	(England) Wolverhampton Wanderers	16 January 2016 (Note: On 17 November 2015, Williamson's loan was extended until 16 January 2016.) (Note: On 1 December 2015, Williamson was recalled due to Jamaal Lascelles injury.)	
10 November 2015	FW	(England) Ivan Toney	(England) Barnsley	9 January 2016 (Note: On 8 December 2015, Toney's loan deal was extended until 9 January 2016.) (Note: On 23 December 2015, Toney was recalled due to Papiss Cissé injury.)	
17 November 2015	MF	(Burundi) Gaël Bigirimana	(England) Coventry City	End of Season (Note: On 5 January 2016, Bigirimana has extended his loan deal until 24 January 2016.) (Note: On 14 January 2016, Bigirimana has extended his loan deal until the End of Season.)	
29 January 2016	DF	(Slovakia) Ľubomír Šatka	(England) York City	End of Season (Note: On 29 February 2016, Šatka has extended his loan deal until the End of Season.)	
31 January 2016	MF	(France) Florian Thauvin	(France) Marseille	End of Season	
24 March 2016	FW	(England) Ivan Toney	(England) Barnsley	8 May 2016	

== Pre-season and friendlies ==
On 4 June 2015, Newcastle United announced their pre-season schedule which included a tour of the United States.

10 July 2015 Friendly	Gateshead	0–1	Newcastle United	Gateshead
20:00 GMT (UTC+1)		Report	Cissé 6' (pen.)	Stadium: Gateshead International Stadium; Referee: Geoff Eltringham (Sunderland)

15 July 2015 Friendly	Club Atlas	2–1	Newcastle United	Milwaukee, United States
02:00 GMT (UTC+1)	Bergessio 11' (pen.), 17'	Report	Sissoko 45'	Stadium: Miller Park; Attendance: 21,256; Referee: Kevin Terry Jr

19 July 2015 Friendly	Sacramento Republic	0–1	Newcastle United	Sacramento, United States
04:00 GMT (UTC+1)		Report	Kiffe 48' (o.g.); Haïdara (red card) 65'	Stadium: Bonney Field; Attendance: 11,432; Referee: Chipalo Street

22 July 2015 Friendly	Portland Timbers 2	4–3	Newcastle United	Portland, United States
03:30 GMT (UTC+1)	Fatawu 13'; Manning 24'; Peay 30'; Besler 70'	Report	Wijnaldum 6'; Aarons 75', 76'	Stadium: Providence Park; Referee: Levi Rippy

26 July 2015 Chris Morgan Testimonial	Sheffield United	2–2	Newcastle United	Sheffield
13:05 GMT (UTC+1)	McNulty 49'; Freeman 86'	Report	Wijnaldum 40' de Jong 79'	Stadium: Bramall Lane; Attendance: 12,002; Referee: Andrew Madley

29 July 2015 Friendly	York City	2–1	Newcastle United	York
19:45 GMT (UTC+1)	Straker 16'; Trialist A 20'	Report	Ayoze 75'	Stadium: Bootham Crescent; Attendance: 5,406; Referee: Scott Duncan

1 August 2015 Friendly	Newcastle United	0–1	Borussia Mönchengladbach	Newcastle upon Tyne
15:00 GMT (UTC+1)		Report	Hazard 66'	Stadium: St James' Park

20 February 2016 Friendly	Lillestrøm	1–2	Newcastle United	La Manga
14:00	Jradi 8'	Report	Wijnaldum 3'; Aarons 75'	Stadium: La Manga Club Football Centre, Spain; Referee: Dag Vidar Hafsas

== Competitions ==
=== Overall ===
Competition	Started round	Current position / round	Final position / round	First match	Last match
Premier League	—	—	18th	9 August 2015	15 May 2016
League Cup	Second round	—	Third round	25 August 2015	23 September 2015
FA Cup	Third round	—	Third round	9 January 2016	9 January 2016

Updated to match played 15 May 2016
Source: Competitions

=== Overview ===
Games played	41 (38 Premier League, 1 FA Cup, 2 League Cup)
Games won	10 (9 Premier League, 1 League Cup)
Games drawn	10 (10 Premier League)
Games lost	21 (19 Premier League, 1 FA Cup, 1 League Cup)
Goals scored	48 (44 Premier League, 4 League Cup)
Goals conceded	68 (65 Premier League, 1 FA Cup, 2 League Cup)
Total goal difference	-20 (−21 Premier League, −1 FA Cup +2 League Cup)
Clean sheets	8 (8 Premier League)
Yellow Cards	61 (56 Premier League, 1 FA Cup, 4 League Cup)
Red Cards	5 (5 Premier League)
Most appearances	(Netherlands) Wijnaldum (40)
Top scorer	(Netherlands) Wijnaldum (11)
Worst Discipline	(England) Colback (11 (yellow card) )
Points in League	37
Best Result	6–2 v Norwich City, Premier League (18/10/15); 5–1 v Tottenham Hotspur, Premier League (15/05/16)
Worst Result	1–6 v Manchester City, Premier League (3/10/15)
Best Home Result	6–2 v Norwich City, Premier League (18/10/15); 5–1 v Tottenham Hotspur, Premier League (15/05/16)
Worst Home Result	0–3 v Leicester City, Premier League (21/11/15)
Best Away Result	1–0 v AFC Bournemouth, Premier League (07/11/15); 2–1 v Tottenham Hotspur, Premier League (13/12/15)
Worst Away Result	1–6 v Manchester City, Premier League (3/10/15)

=== Premier League ===
==== League table ====
Pos	Team	Pld	W	D	L	GF	GA	GD	Pts	Qualification or relegation
16	Bournemouth	38	11	9	18	45	67	−22	42	
17	Sunderland	38	9	12	17	48	62	−14	39	
18	Newcastle United (R)	38	9	10	19	44	65	−21	37	Relegation to EFL Championship
19	Norwich City (R)	38	9	7	22	39	67	−28	34	Relegation to EFL Championship
20	Aston Villa (R)	38	3	8	27	27	76	−49	17	Relegation to EFL Championship

Source: Barclays Premier League
Rules for classification: 1) Points; 2) Goal difference; 3) Goals scored; 4) Play-offs (only if needed to decide champion, teams for relegation or teams for UEFA competitions).
(R) Relegated

==== Results summary ====
Overall								Home						Away					
Pld	W	D	L	GF	GA	GD	Pts	W	D	L	GF	GA	GD	W	D	L	GF	GA	GD
38	9	10	19	44	65	−21	37	7	7	5	32	24	+8	2	3	14	12	41	−29

Last updated: 15 May 2016.

==== Results by matchday ====
Matchday	1	2	3	4	5	6	7	8	9	10	11	12	13	14	15	16	17	18	19	20	21	22	23	24	25	26	27	28	29	30	31	32	33	34	35	36	37	38
Ground	H	A	A	H	A	H	H	A	H	A	H	A	H	A	H	A	H	H	A	A	H	H	A	A	H	A	A	H	A	H	A	A	H	H	A	H	A	H
Result	D	L	D	L	L	L	D	L	W	L	D	W	L	L	W	W	D	L	L	L	D	W	L	L	W	L	L	L	L	D	L	L	W	D	D	W	D	W
Position	10	15	17	19	20	19	19	20	18	19	18	17	17	19	18	15	17	18	18	18	19	17	18	18	17	18	19	19	19	19	19	19	19	19	19	18	18	18

Source: Statto.com
A = Away; H = Home; W = Win; D = Draw; L = Loss

==== Matches ====
The fixtures for the 2015–16 season were released on 17 June 2015.

9 August 2015 1	Newcastle United	2–2	Southampton	Newcastle upon Tyne
13:30	Cissé 42'; Wijnaldum 48'; Colback (yellow card) 55'; Mitrović (yellow card) 75'	Report	Cédric (yellow card) 12'; Pellè 24', (yellow card) 90+3'; Fonte (yellow card) 60'; Long 79'; Davis (yellow card) 87'	Stadium: St James' Park; Attendance: 49,019; Referee: Craig Pawson

15 August 2015 2	Swansea City	2–0	Newcastle United	Swansea
15:00	Gomis 9'; Ayew (yellow card) 49', (goal) 52'; Naughton (yellow card) 61'	Report	Janmaat (yellow card) 17' (yellow-red card) 41'; Mitrović (yellow card) 84'	Stadium: Liberty Stadium; Attendance: 20,678; Referee: Mike Jones

22 August 2015 3	Manchester United	0–0	Newcastle United	Manchester
12:45	Darmian (yellow card) 19'; Shaw (yellow card) 70'	Report	Haïdara (yellow card) 20'; Obertan (yellow card) 57'	Stadium: Old Trafford; Attendance: 75,354; Referee: Craig Pawson

29 August 2015 4	Newcastle United	0–1	Arsenal	Newcastle upon Tyne
12:45	Sissoko (yellow card) 3'; Mitrović (red card) 16'; Mbemba (yellow card) 19'; Thauvin (yellow card) 26'; Anita (yellow card) 48'; Wijnaldum (yellow card) 49'; Coloccini (yellow card) 90+3'	Report	Cazorla (yellow card) 49'; Coloccini 52' (o.g.)	Stadium: St James' Park; Attendance: 50,388; Referee: Andre Marriner

14 September 2015 5	West Ham United	2–0	Newcastle United	London
20:00	Payet 9', 48'	Report	Colback (yellow card) 30'; Janmaat (yellow card) 57'	Stadium: Boleyn Ground; Attendance: 34,907; Referee: Anthony Taylor

19 September 2015 6	Newcastle United	1–2	Watford	Newcastle upon Tyne
15:00	Janmaat 62'; Colback (yellow card) 89'	Report	Ighalo 10', 28'; Abdi (yellow card) 36'; Capoue (yellow card) 80'	Stadium: St James' Park; Attendance: 47,806; Referee: Roger East

26 September 2015 7	Newcastle United	2–2	Chelsea	Newcastle upon Tyne
17:30	Colback (yellow card) 34'; Ayoze 42'; Wijnaldum 60'	Report	Ivanović (yellow card) 68'; Ramires 79'; Willian 86'; Pedro (yellow card) 90+7'	Stadium: St James' Park; Attendance: 48,682; Referee: Martin Atkinson

3 October 2015 8	Manchester City	6–1	Newcastle United	Manchester
15:00	Agüero 42', 49', 50', 60', 62'; Fernandinho (yellow card) 45+1'; De Bruyne 53'; Zabaleta (yellow card) 82'; Mangala (yellow card) 88'	Report	Mitrović 18'; Anita (yellow card) 36'	Stadium: City of Manchester Stadium; Attendance: 53,850; Referee: Kevin Friend

18 October 2015 9	Newcastle United	6–2	Norwich City	Newcastle upon Tyne
16:00	Tioté (yellow card) 6'; Wijnaldum 14', 26', 66', 85'; Ayoze 33'; Mitrović 64'	Report	Mbokani 20'; Redmond 34'; Dorrans (yellow card) 66'	Stadium: St James' Park; Attendance: 47,006; Referee: Anthony Taylor

25 October 2015 10	Sunderland	3–0	Newcastle United	Sunderland
12:00	Johnson 45+3' (pen.); Jones 65'; Fletcher 86'	Report	Tioté (yellow card) 14'; Coloccini (red card) 45+1'; Colback (yellow card) 45+3'	Stadium: Stadium of Light; Attendance: 47,653; Referee: Robert Madley

31 October 2015 11	Newcastle United	0–0	Stoke City	Newcastle upon Tyne
15:00	Mitrović (yellow card) 63'	Report	Wollscheid (yellow card) 63'; Arnautović (yellow card) 82'; Adam (yellow card) 90+3'	Stadium: St James' Park; Attendance: 47,139; Referee: Roger East

7 November 2015 12	AFC Bournemouth	0–1	Newcastle United	Bournemouth
12:45	Arter (yellow card) 69'; Smith (yellow card) 83'	Report	Ayoze 27'; Janmaat (yellow card) 44'; Tioté (yellow card) 88'	Stadium: Vitality Stadium; Attendance: 11,155; Referee: Lee Mason

21 November 2015 13	Newcastle United	0–3	Leicester City	Newcastle upon Tyne
15:00	Anita (yellow card) 36'; Dummett (yellow card) 48'; Pérez (yellow card) 76'; Sissoko (yellow card) 79'	Report	Huth (yellow card) 31'; Vardy 45+1'; Ulloa 62'; Okazaki 83'	Stadium: St James' Park; Attendance: 50,151; Referee: Mike Jones

28 November 2015 14	Crystal Palace	5–1	Newcastle United	London
15:00	McArthur 14', 90+3'; Bolasie 17', 47'; Zaha (yellow card) 38', (goal) 41'	Report	Cissé 10'; Mbemba (yellow card) 81'	Stadium: Selhurst Park; Attendance: 24,833; Referee: Stuart Attwell

6 December 2015 15	Newcastle United	2–0	Liverpool	Newcastle upon Tyne
16:00	Colback (yellow card) 34'; Anita (yellow card) 60'; Cissé (yellow card) 63'; Škrtel 69' (o.g.); Wijnaldum 90+3'	Report	Lucas (yellow card) 44'	Stadium: St James' Park; Attendance: 51,273; Referee: Andre Marriner

13 December 2015 16	Tottenham Hotspur	1–2	Newcastle United	London
16:00	Dier 39'; Carroll (yellow card) 68'; Rose (yellow card) 73'	Report	Colback (yellow card) 30'; Mitrović 74'; Pérez (yellow card) 80', (goal) 90+3'	Stadium: White Hart Lane; Attendance: 35,768; Referee: Roger East

19 December 2015 17	Newcastle United	1–1	Aston Villa	Newcastle upon Tyne
17:30	Coloccini 38'; Dummett (yellow card) 41'	Report	Ayew 61', (yellow card) 79'; Bacuna (yellow card) 77'; Westwood (yellow card) 84'	Stadium: St James' Park; Attendance: 48,234; Referee: Martin Atkinson

26 December 2015 18	Newcastle United	0–1	Everton	Newcastle upon Tyne
17:30	Janmaat (yellow card) 11'; Colback (yellow card) 82'	Report	Barry (yellow card) 36'; Barkley (yellow card) 63'; Cleverley 90+4'	Stadium: St James' Park; Attendance: 51,682; Referee: Lee Mason

28 December 2015 19	West Bromwich Albion	1–0	Newcastle United	Birmingham
15:00	Fletcher 78'	Report		Stadium: The Hawthorns; Attendance: 26,313; Referee: Mike Jones

2 January 2016 20	Arsenal	1–0	Newcastle United	London
15:00	Koscielny 72'; Flamini (yellow card) 82'	Report	Colback (yellow card) 35'; Janmaat (yellow card) 68'	Stadium: Emirates Stadium; Attendance: 59,257; Referee: Anthony Taylor

12 January 2016 21	Newcastle United	3–3	Manchester United	Newcastle upon Tyne
19:45	Tioté (yellow card) 35'; Wijnaldum 42'; Mitrović 67' (pen.); Dummett 90'	Report	Rooney 9' (pen.), 79'; Fellaini (yellow card) 25'; Herrera (yellow card) 30'; Lingard 38'; Smalling (yellow card) 66'	Stadium: St James' Park; Attendance: 49,673; Referee: Mike Dean

16 January 2016 22	Newcastle United	2–1	West Ham United	Newcastle upon Tyne
15:00	Ayoze 6'; Wijnaldum 15'; Elliot (yellow card) 90+1'	Report	Jelavić 49'	Stadium: St James' Park; Attendance: 50,031; Referee: Neil Swarbrick

23 January 2016 23	Watford	2–1	Newcastle United	Watford
15:00	Ighalo 46'; Behrami (yellow card) 56'; Cathcart 58'; Britos (yellow card) 68'	Report	Mbemba (yellow card) 50'; Lascelles 71'	Stadium: Vicarage Road; Attendance: 20,611; Referee: Andre Marriner

3 February 2016 24	Everton	3–0	Newcastle United	Liverpool
19:45	Lennon 23'; Coleman (yellow card) 74'; Barkley 88' (pen.), 90+4' (pen.)	Report	Shelvey (yellow card) 61'; Lascelles (yellow card) 88' (yellow-red card) 90+3'	Stadium: Goodison Park; Attendance: 36,061; Referee: Craig Pawson

6 February 2016 25	Newcastle United	1–0	West Bromwich Albion	Newcastle upon Tyne
15:00	Mitrović 32'	Report	McAuley (yellow card) 47'; Chester (yellow card) 63'; Olsson (yellow card) 83'	Stadium: St James' Park; Attendance: 50,152; Referee: Lee Mason

13 February 2016 26	Chelsea	5–1	Newcastle United	London
17:30	Costa 5'; Pedro 9', 59'; Wilian 17'; Traoré 83'	Report	Taylor (yellow card) 19'; Shelvey (yellow card) 61'; Townsend 90'	Stadium: Stamford Bridge; Attendance: 41,622; Referee: Roger East

2 March 2016 27	Stoke City	1–0	Newcastle United	Stoke-on-Trent
19:45	Muniesa (yellow card) 45+1'; Shaqiri 80'	Report		Stadium: Britannia Stadium; Attendance: 27,331; Referee: Neil Swarbrick

5 March 2016 28	Newcastle United	1–3	AFC Bournemouth	Newcastle upon Tyne
15:00	Pérez (yellow card) 56', (goal) 80'	Report	Taylor 28' (o.g.); Cook (yellow card) 45'; King 70'; Gosling (yellow card) 75'; Grabban (yellow card) 89'; Daniels 90+2'	Stadium: St James' Park; Attendance: 52,107; Referee: Paul Tierney

14 March 2016 29	Leicester City	1–0	Newcastle United	Leicester
20:00	Okazaki 25'	Report		Stadium: King Power Stadium; Attendance: 31,824; Referee: Craig Pawson

20 March 2016 30	Newcastle United	1–1	Sunderland	Newcastle upon Tyne
13:30	Colback (yellow card) 18'; Janmaat (yellow card) 36'; Shelvey (yellow card) 52'; Mitrović 83', (yellow card) 84'	Report	Defoe 44'; Mannone (yellow card) 90'	Stadium: St James' Park; Attendance: 52,311; Referee: Martin Atkinson

2 April 2016 31	Norwich City	3–2	Newcastle United	Norwich
15:00	Klose 45+2'; Mbokani 74'; Olsson 90+3'	Report	Mitrović 71', 86' (pen.)	Stadium: Carrow Road; Attendance: 27,127; Referee: Mike Dean

9 April 2016 32	Southampton	3–1	Newcastle United	Southampton
15:00	Long 4'; Pellè 38'; Wanyama 55'	Report	Townsend 65'	Stadium: St Mary's Stadium; Attendance: 31,542; Referee: Robert Madley

16 April 2016 33	Newcastle United	3–0	Swansea City	Newcastle upon Tyne
15:00	Mbemba (yellow card) 22'; Lascelles 40'; Anita (yellow card) 73'; Sissoko 82'; Townsend 89'	Report	Fer (yellow card) 10'	Stadium: St James' Park; Attendance: 48,949; Referee: Lee Mason

19 April 2016 34	Newcastle United	1–1	Manchester City	Newcastle upon Tyne
19:45	Anita 31', (yellow card) 43'; Pérez (yellow card) 56'; Sissoko (yellow card) 90+5'	Report	Agüero 14'; Kompany (yellow card) 67'; Mangala (yellow card) 90'	Stadium: St James' Park; Attendance: 46,424; Referee: Kevin Friend

23 April 2016 35	Liverpool	2–2	Newcastle United	Liverpool
15:00	Sturridge 2'; Lallana 30'; Milner (yellow card) 54'	Report	Tioté (yellow card) 22'; Cissé 48'; Colback 66'	Stadium: Anfield; Attendance: 43,837; Referee: Andre Marriner

30 April 2016 36	Newcastle United	1–0	Crystal Palace	Newcastle upon Tyne
15:00	Mbemba (yellow card) 6'; Townsend 58'; Colback (yellow card) 66'	Report		Stadium: St James' Park; Attendance: 52,107; Referee: Mike Dean

7 May 2016 37	Aston Villa	0–0	Newcastle United	Birmingham
15:00	Clark (yellow card) 59'	Report	Dummett (yellow card) 90'	Stadium: Villa Park; Attendance: 33,055; Referee: Robert Madley

15 May 2016 38	Newcastle United	5–1	Tottenham Hotspur	Newcastle upon Tyne
15:00	Wijnaldum 19', 73' (pen.); Mitrović 39', (red card) 67'; Aarons 85', (yellow card) 85'; Janmaat 86'	Report	Mason (yellow card) 45+2'; Lamela 60', (yellow card) 62'	Stadium: St James' Park; Attendance: 52,183; Referee: Anthony Taylor

- Note: Due to copyright restrictions, the full fixture list can't be reproduced without the relevant licensing from Football DataCo, but can be found here.

=== FA Cup ===
The FA Cup first round Draw was made on 26 October 2015. Newcastle United had a bye in the First and second round, and entered the competition at the third round stage.

9 January 2016 Third round	Watford	1–0	Newcastle United	Watford
15:00	Deeney 44'; Guedioura (yellow card) 83'	Report	Tioté (yellow card) 37'	Stadium: Vicarage Road; Attendance: 18,259; Referee: Roger East

=== League Cup ===
The Capital One Cup first round Draw was made on 16 June 2015. Newcastle United had a bye in the first round, and entered the competition at the second round.

25 August 2015 Second round	Newcastle United	4–1	Northampton Town	Newcastle upon Tyne
19:45	Thauvin 3' de Jong 8'; Tioté (yellow card) 20'; Janmaat 56'; Williamson 63'; Pérez (yellow card) 69'	Report	Richards 10' (pen.); Yates (yellow card) 62'; Cresswell (yellow card) 86'	Stadium: St James' Park; Attendance: 26,923; Referee: David Coote

23 September 2015 Third round	Newcastle United	0–1	Sheffield Wednesday	Newcastle upon Tyne
19:45	Mabau (yellow card) 61'; Pérez (yellow card) 75'	Report	Matias (yellow card) 61'; McGugan 76', (yellow card) 90+3'	Stadium: St James' Park; Attendance: 33,986; Referee: Chris Kavanagh

== Statistics ==
=== Appearances and goals ===
Last updated on 31 May 2016.

No.	Pos	Nat	Player	Total		Premier League		FA Cup		League Cup	
No.	Pos	Nat	Player	Apps	Goals	Apps	Goals	Apps	Goals	Apps	Goals
Goalkeepers
1	GK	(Netherlands) NED	Tim Krul	9	0	8	0	0	0	1	0
21	GK	(Republic of Ireland) IRL	Rob Elliot	22	0	21	0	1	0	0	0
26	GK	(England) ENG	Karl Darlow	10	0	9	0	0	0	1	0
Defenders
2	DF	(Argentina) ARG	Fabricio Coloccini	27	1	26	1	1	0	0	0
3	DF	(Wales) WAL	Paul Dummett	24	1	23	1	1	0	0	0
6	DF	(England) ENG	Mike Williamson	2	1	0	0	0	0	2	1
15	DF	(England) ENG	Jamaal Lascelles	21	2	10+8	2	0+1	0	2	0
18	DF	(Democratic Republic of the Congo) COD	Chancel Mbemba	35	0	33	0	1	0	1	0
19	DF	(France) FRA	Massadio Haïdara	8	0	6+1	0	0	0	1	0
22	DF	(Netherlands) NED	Daryl Janmaat	35	3	32	2	1	0	2	1
27	DF	(England) ENG	Steven Taylor	10	0	9+1	0	0	0	0	0
42	DF	(England) ENG	Jamie Sterry	1	0	0+1	0	0	0	0	0
43	DF	(Switzerland) SUI	Kevin Mbabu	5	0	2+1	0	1	0	0+1	0
Midfielders
4	MF	(England) ENG	Jack Colback	30	1	28+1	1	0	0	0+1	0
5	MF	(Netherlands) NED	Georginio Wijnaldum	40	11	36+2	11	1	0	1	0
7	MF	(France) FRA	Moussa Sissoko	39	1	37	1	1	0	1	0
8	MF	(Netherlands) NED	Vurnon Anita	29	1	24+4	1	0	0	1	0
10	MF	(Netherlands) NED	Siem de Jong	21	1	3+15	0	0+1	0	2	1
11	MF	(France) FRA	Yoan Gouffran	9	0	2+6	0	0	0	1	0
12	MF	(England) ENG	Jonjo Shelvey	15	0	11+4	0	0	0	0	0
14	MF	(France) FRA	Gabriel Obertan	6	0	3+2	0	0	0	1	0
16	MF	(England) ENG	Rolando Aarons	11	1	3+7	1	0	0	1	0
20	MF	(France) FRA	Florian Thauvin	16	1	3+10	0	0+1	0	2	1
23	MF	(Senegal) SEN	Henri Saivet	4	0	2+2	0	0	0	0	0
24	MF	(Ivory Coast) CIV	Cheick Tioté	22	0	16+4	0	1	0	1	0
25	MF	(England) ENG	Andros Townsend	13	4	12+1	4	0	0	0	0
Forwards
9	FW	(Senegal) SEN	Papiss Cissé	21	3	14+7	3	0	0	0	0
17	FW	(Spain) ESP	Ayoze Pérez	37	6	22+12	6	1	0	1+1	0
28	FW	(Ivory Coast) CIV	Seydou Doumbia	3	0	0+3	0	0	0	0	0
29	FW	(France) FRA	Emmanuel Rivière	3	0	1+2	0	0	0	0	0
36	FW	(England) ENG	Ivan Toney	4	0	0+2	0	0	0	0+2	0
45	FW	(Serbia) SRB	Aleksandar Mitrović	36	9	22+12	9	1	0	0+1	0

=== Captains ===
Accounts for all competitions. Last updated on 15 May 2016.

No.	Pos.	Name	Starts
2	DF	(Argentina) Fabricio Coloccini	26
7	MF	(France) Moussa Sissoko	6
12	MF	(England) Jonjo Shelvey	6
10	MF	(Netherlands) Siem de Jong	2

=== Cards ===
Accounts for all competitions. Last updated on 15 May 2016.

No.	Pos.	Name	Yellow card	Red card
2	DF	(Argentina) Fabricio Coloccini	1	1
3	DF	(Wales) Paul Dummett	3	0
4	MF	(England) Jack Colback	11	0
5	MF	(Netherlands) Georginio Wijnaldum	1	0
7	MF	(France) Moussa Sissoko	3	0
8	MF	(Netherlands) Vurnon Anita	6	0
9	FW	(Senegal) Papiss Cissé	1	0
12	MF	(England) Jonjo Shelvey	9	0
14	MF	(France) Gabriel Obertan	1	0
15	DF	(England) Jamaal Lascelles	0	1
16	MF	(England) Rolando Aarons	1	0
17	FW	(Spain) Ayoze Pérez	6	0
18	DF	(Democratic Republic of the Congo) Chancel Mbemba	5	0
19	DF	(France) Massadio Haïdara	1	0
20	MF	(France) Florian Thauvin	1	0
21	GK	(Republic of Ireland) Rob Elliot	1	0
22	DF	(Netherlands) Daryl Janmaat	5	1
24	MF	(Ivory Coast) Cheick Tioté	7	0
27	DF	(England) Steven Taylor	1	0
43	DF	(Switzerland) Kevin Mbabu	1	0
45	FW	(Serbia) Aleksandar Mitrović	4	2

=== Goals ===
Last updated on 15 May 2016.

Place	Position	Nation	Number	Name	Premier League	FA Cup	League Cup	Total
1	MF	(Netherlands)	5	Georginio Wijnaldum	11	0	0	11
2	FW	(Serbia)	45	Aleksandar Mitrović	9	0	0	9
3	FW	(Spain)	17	Ayoze Pérez	6	0	0	6
4	MF	(England)	25	Andros Townsend	4	0	0	4
5	FW	(Senegal)	9	Papiss Cissé	3	0	0	3
5	DF	(Netherlands)	22	Daryl Janmaat	2	0	1	3
7	DF	(England)	15	Jamaal Lascelles	2	0	0	2
8	DF	(Argentina)	2	Fabricio Coloccini	1	0	0	1
8	DF	(Wales)	3	Paul Dummett	1	0	0	1
8	MF	(England)	4	Jack Colback	1	0	0	1
8	DF	(England)	6	Mike Williamson	0	0	1	1
8	MF	(France)	7	Moussa Sissoko	1	0	0	1
8	MF	(Netherlands)	8	Vurnon Anita	1	0	0	1
8	MF	(Netherlands)	10	Siem de Jong	0	0	1	1
8	MF	(England)	16	Rolando Aarons	1	0	0	1
8	MF	(France)	20	Florian Thauvin	0	0	1	1
8	Own goals				1	0	0	1
TOTALS					44	0	4	48

=== Clean sheets ===
Last updated on 7 May 2016.

Place	Number	Name	Premier League	FA Cup	League Cup	Total
1	21	(Republic of Ireland) Rob Elliot	4	0	0	4
2	26	(England) Karl Darlow	3	0	0	3
3	1	(Netherlands) Tim Krul	1	0	0	1
Totals			8	0	0	8
