= Mike Williamson (footballer) =

English footballer and manager (born 1983)

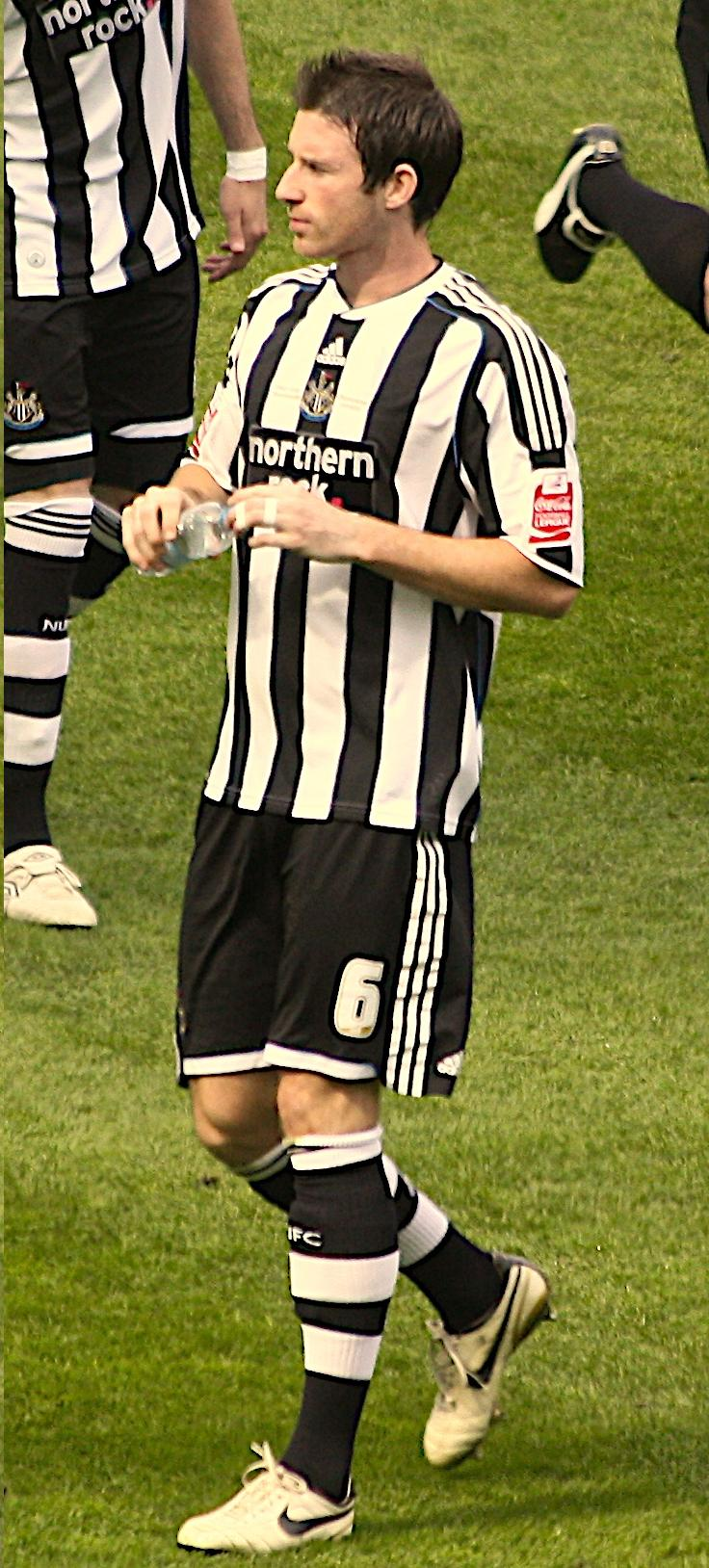
- Williamson playing for Newcastle United in 2010

Personal information
- Full name: Michael James Williamson
- Date of birth: 8 November 1983 (age 43)
- Place of birth: Stoke-on-Trent, England
- Height: 6 ft 4 in (1.93 m)
- Position: Centre back

Team information
- Current team: South Shields (head coach)

Youth career
- –2001: Torquay United

Senior career*
Years	Team	Apps	(Gls)
2001	Torquay United	5	(0)
2001–2005	Southampton	0	(0)
2003	→ Torquay United (loan)	11	(0)
2004	→ Doncaster Rovers (loan)	0	(0)
2004–2005	→ Wycombe Wanderers (loan)	37	(2)
2005–2009	Wycombe Wanderers	107	(9)
2009	Watford	21	(2)
2009–2010	Portsmouth	0	(0)
2010–2016	Newcastle United	150	(1)
2015	→ Wolverhampton Wanderers (loan)	5	(0)
2016–2017	Wolverhampton Wanderers	5	(0)
2017–2018	Oxford United	14	(0)
2018–2023	Gateshead	62	(2)
Total		417	(16)

Managerial career
- 2019–2023: Gateshead
- 2023–2024: Milton Keynes Dons
- 2024–2025: Carlisle United
- 2026–: South Shields
- * Club domestic league appearances and goals

Michael James Williamson (born 8 November 1983) is an English football manager and former professional player who is currently the head coach of National League North club South Shields.

He played mostly for Wycombe Wanderers and Newcastle United in England, helping them to achieve promotion from Football League Two and the Championship respectively.

== Club career ==
=== Early career ===
Born in Stoke-on-Trent, Staffordshire, Williamson grew up supporting Port Vale. Having joined the academy of Torquay United, he went on to play six first-team games before joining Southampton in November 2001 for an initial fee believed to be in the region of £100,000. However, Williamson was unable to get into the first team at Southampton. He returned to Plainmoor on loan for two months in September 2003, where he made 11 further appearances. A further loan spell at Doncaster Rovers—then Third Division leaders—followed on transfer deadline day in March 2004, although he did not feature for the South Yorkshire club.

=== Wycombe Wanderers ===
Wycombe Wanderers manager Tony Adams secured Williamson's services on a season-long loan in July 2004, a move that was made permanent at the end of the 2004–05 season. Williamson made the number 6 shirt his own from the start of the 2005–06 season. In total, he made 144 league appearances for Wycombe, scoring 11 league goals during his time at the club.

=== Watford ===
After a few consistent seasons he signed for Watford on 26 January 2009 for an undisclosed fee, signing a three-and-a-half-year contract. He handed in a transfer request on 27 August 2009, declaring himself unfit for the away game at Swansea City on the Saturday and not travelling with the squad.

=== Portsmouth ===
On 1 September 2009, Watford accepted a £2 million offer, potentially rising to £3 million, from Premier League team Portsmouth. He did not make a single appearance for the club, who were in the midst of a financial crisis.

=== Newcastle United ===
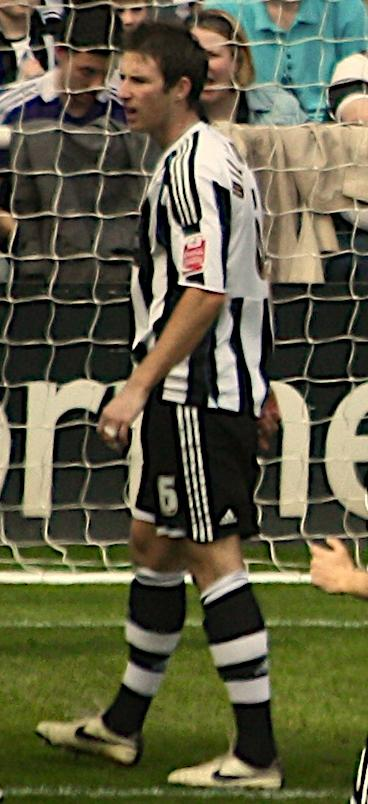
Williamson playing for Newcastle United in 2010

Williamson signed for Newcastle United on 27 January 2010 for an undisclosed fee. He made his debut the same day at St James' Park in a 2–0 win over Crystal Palace, in which he played the full 90 minutes and won the Man of the Match award in the process. On 28 January it was revealed that he was initially signed on an emergency loan deal in order for him to play the previous day, with the deal then finalised and Williamson signing a three-and-a-half-year contract. On 3 December 2010, Williamson signed a new five-and-a-half-year contract extension with the club, which ran until 2016. For the remainder of the season, he formed a reliable partnership with Fabricio Coloccini in the absence of the injured Steven Taylor.

With Newcastle's return to the Premier League, Williamson continued to be Coloccini's first-choice partner and managed to keep Taylor on the bench until an injury ended his run in the starting eleven. Despite this he managed 32 first team appearances, and 29 in the Premier League, across the 2010–11 season. The following season, 2011–12, consecutive arm and ankle injuries hampered his first team opportunities and he was out of the first team between late August and late December.

At the end of the 2013–14 season, Williamson was named as Newcatle's Player of the Year. On 30 August 2014, Williamson scored his first goal for the club in a 3–3 home league draw against Crystal Palace, tapping the ball in after teammate Rolando Aarons struck the post.

On 3 May 2015, Williamson was sent off picking up a second yellow after a late challenge on Jamie Vardy, as Newcastle lost 3–0 to Leicester City, their eighth defeat in a row. After the match, Newcastle manager John Carver accused Williamson of deliberately getting himself sent off, which Williamson strongly denied.

=== Wolverhampton Wanderers ===
Having not featured in the league under new coach Steve McClaren, Williamson was loaned to Championship side Wolverhampton Wanderers on 29 October 2015 for one month to cover for the injured Kortney Hause. His debut came two days later in Wolves' next game, a 2–0 win away to rivals Birmingham City in which Williamson received the man of the match award. After making three appearances, over the course of which the club conceded just one goal and picked up four points, his loan was initially extended until January, but he was recalled after five appearances in total because of injuries at his parent club. However, Williamson immediately picked up an injury of his own which subsequently kept him out for the rest of 2015–16 season.

Despite his injury, on 29 January 2016, Williamson put pen to paper on an 18-month contract with Wolves after impressing during his earlier loan spell at the Midlands club, for a reported fee of £250,000. Williamson said upon signing for Wolves: "I loved my time here so that's why I'm here now. It's great to be back." However, persistent injury problems prevented him from making a single appearance that year and he was not assigned a squad number at the start of the 2016–17 season. He eventually made a return to football on 7 January 2017, making his first senior appearance for Wolves since signing permanently, in a 2–0 FA Cup away win against Stoke. Two months later he made his first league appearance, in a 2–1 defeat to Reading in which he was sent off for two yellow-card offences. His final appearance for the club came in a 3–1 defeat to Derby County at Pride Park on 29 April 2017.

After having made just six appearances across all competitions since signing permanently for the club, in spite of his expressed desire to stay, it was announced on 19 May 2017 that Williamson would be released by Wolves upon the expiry of his contract.

=== Oxford United ===
Williamson signed for Oxford United of League One on 26 July 2017 on a one-year contract. He made his debut against Oldham Athletic in the opening match of the 2017–18 season, which ended in a 2–0 away victory for Oxford. He made 14 league appearances during the season, at the end of which he was released by newly appointed manager Karl Robinson.

=== Gateshead ===
In August 2018, he signed a one-year contract with Gateshead. Williamson, like the majority of Gateshead's players and staff, did not have his contract renewed at the end of the season due to financial issues. He became a player-coach on 14 January 2019 after Ben Clark was appointed manager permanently.

== Managerial and coaching career ==
=== Gateshead ===
Williamson was appointed as player-manager of Gateshead on 11 June 2019 with Ian Watson as his assistant, after the club's demotion to the National League North. His side were in eighth, two points off the playoffs, when the season was abandoned in March 2020 due to the COVID-19 pandemic.

After picking up a maximum 12 points from four games in December 2021, seeing his side in the promotion picture, Williamson was awarded the National League North Manager of the Month. On 2 May 2022, in the penultimate match of the 2021–22 season, a 2–2 draw with Chorley saw Gateshead crowned champions and promoted back to the National League, three years after their demotion. Williamson was later named National League North Manager of the Season.

In the 2022–23 season, Williamson guided Gateshead to a 14th-place finish in the National League and a place in the 2023 FA Trophy final, but lost 1–0 to FC Halifax Town. He left Gateshead in October 2023 with the club in 6th position in the National League.

=== Milton Keynes Dons ===
On 17 October 2023, Williamson was appointed manager of League Two club Milton Keynes Dons with the club in 16th position. On 11 January 2024 he was named the EFL League Two Manager of the Month for December following a perfect month of results in which the club achieved 12 points from four games, returning them to play-off contention. Williamson went on to lead the club to a fourth place play-off finish, but was defeated 8–1 on aggregate over two semi-final legs to eventual play-off winners Crawley Town.

=== Carlisle United ===
On 19 September 2024, Williamson was appointed head coach of fellow League Two club Carlisle United. After just five wins from 25 games, he was sacked on 3 February 2025, with the club five points from safety in League Two.

=== Rangers ===
On 3 July 2025, Williamson was appointed first-team coach at Scottish Premiership side Rangers to work under head coach Russell Martin.

Williamson, Martin and assistant head coach Matt Gill were removed from their respective positions on 5 October 2025, following the club's poor performance.

=== South Shields ===
In January 2026, following Matty Pattison's departure, Williamson was named as a voluntary first-team coach at National League North side South Shields as part of manager Ian Watson's coaching staff. On 9 April 2026, it was announced that Williamson had been named as South Shields' Director of Performance and Culture.

On 14 June 2026, following the departure of Watson and assistant manager Carl Magnay to join League Two club Rochdale, Williamson was appointed head coach of South Shields with immediate effect.

== Career statistics ==
Appearances and goals by club, season and competition
Club	Season	League			FA Cup		League Cup		Other		Total	
Club	Season	Division	Apps	Goals	Apps	Goals	Apps	Goals	Apps	Goals	Apps	Goals
Torquay United	2001–02	Third Division	5	0	0	0	0	0	1 (Note: Appearance(s) in Football League Trophy)	0	6	0
Southampton	2001–02	Premier League	0	0	0	0	0	0	—		0	0
Southampton	2002–03	Premier League	0	0	0	0	0	0	—		0	0
Southampton	2003–04	Premier League	0	0	0	0	0	0	—		0	0
Southampton	2004–05	Premier League	0	0	—		—		—		0	0
Southampton	Total		0	0	0	0	0	0	—		0	0
Torquay United (loan)	2003–04	Third Division	11	0	0	0	—		1	0	12	0
Doncaster Rovers (loan)	2003–04	Third Division	0	0	—		—		—		0	0
Wycombe Wanderers (loan)	2004–05	League Two	37	2	2	0	0	0	2	0	41	2
Wycombe Wanderers	2005–06	League Two	40	5	0	0	2	0	4 (Note: Three appearances in Football League Trophy, one in League Two play-offs)	0	46	5
Wycombe Wanderers	2006–07	League Two	33	1	2	0	7	1	1	0	43	2
Wycombe Wanderers	2007–08	League Two	12	0	0	0	0	0	2 (Note: Appearances in League Two play-offs)	0	14	0
Wycombe Wanderers	2008–09	League Two	22	3	1	0	0	0	0	0	23	3
Wycombe Wanderers	Total		144	11	5	0	9	1	9	0	167	12
Watford	2008–09	Championship	17	1	—		—		—		17	1
Watford	2009–10	Championship	4	1	—		2	1	—		6	2
Watford	Total		21	2	—		2	1	—		23	3
Portsmouth	2009–10	Premier League	0	0	0	0	—		—		0	0
Newcastle United	2009–10	Championship	16	0	—		—		—		16	0
Newcastle United	2010–11	Premier League	29	0	1	0	2	0	—		32	0
Newcastle United	2011–12	Premier League	22	0	2	0	1	0	—		25	0
Newcastle United	2012–13	Premier League	19	0	1	0	1	0	7 (Note: Appearances in UEFA Europa League)	0	28	0
Newcastle United	2013–14	Premier League	33	0	0	0	2	0	—		35	0
Newcastle United	2014–15	Premier League	31	1	1	0	1	0	—		33	1
Newcastle United	2015–16	Premier League	0	0	0	0	0	0	—		0	0
Newcastle United	Total		150	1	5	0	7	0	7	0	169	1
Wolverhampton Wanderers	2015–16	Championship	5	0	—		—		—		5	0
Wolverhampton Wanderers	2016–17	Championship	5	0	1	0	0	0	—		6	0
Wolverhampton Wanderers	Total		10	0	1	0	0	0	—		11	0
Oxford United	2017–18	League One	14	0	1	0	0	0	2 (Note: Appearances in EFL Trophy)	0	17	0
Gateshead	2018–19	National League	31	0	2	0	—		1 (Note: Appearance in FA Trophy)	0	34	0
Gateshead	2019–20	National League North	23	1	2	0	—		1	0	26	1
Gateshead	Total		54	1	2	0	—		1	0	60	1
Career total			386	14	14	0	18	2	21	0	439	17

== Managerial statistics ==
As of match played 21 November 2026

Managerial record by team and tenure
Team	From	To	Record					Ref
Team	From	To	P	W	D	L	Win %	Ref
Gateshead	11 June 2019	17 October 2023	175	83	45	47	47.4	
Milton Keynes Dons	17 October 2023	19 September 2024	46	22	5	19	47.8	
Carlisle United	19 September 2024	3 February 2025	25	5	6	14	20.0	
South Shields	14 June 2026	Present	20	14	2	4	70.00	
Total			266	124	58	84	46.6	

== Honours ==
=== As a player ===
Torquay United

- Football League Third Division third-place promotion: 2003–04

Wycombe Wanderers

- Football League Two third-place promotion: 2008–09

Newcastle United

- Football League Championship: 2009–10

Individual

- Newcastle United Player of the Year: 2013–14

=== As a manager ===
Gateshead

- National League North: 2021–22
- FA Trophy runner-up: 2022–23

Individual

- National League North Manager of the Month: December 2021
- National League North Manager of the Year: 2021–22
- EFL League Two Manager of the Month: December 2023
