= Gaël Bigirimana =

Burundian footballer (born 1993)

Personal information
- Full name: Gaël Bigirimana
- Date of birth: 22 October 1993 (age 33)
- Place of birth: Bujumbura, Burundi
- Height: 5 ft 9 in (1.75 m)
- Position: Midfielder

Team information
- Current team: Dungannon Swifts
- Number: 34

Youth career
- 2005–2011: Coventry City

Senior career*
Years	Team	Apps	(Gls)
2011–2012	Coventry City	26	(0)
2012–2016	Newcastle United	13	(1)
2015	→ Rangers (loan)	0	(0)
2015–2016	→ Coventry City (loan)	13	(0)
2016–2017	Coventry City	30	(0)
2017–2019	Motherwell	46	(2)
2019	Hibernian	1	(0)
2019–2020	Solihull Moors	0	(0)
2020–2022	Glentoran	43	(0)
2022–2024	Young Africans	?	(?)
2023–2024	→ Dungannon Swifts (loan)	24	(2)
2024–	Dungannon Swifts	93	(5)

International career^{‡}
2013	England U20	2	(0)
2015–	Burundi	23	(0)
- * Club domestic league appearances and goals as of 29 April 2026 ‡ National team caps and goals as of 2 September 2025

Gaël Bigirimana (Kirundi pronunciation: [ɡaˈeːl βiɟiriˈmaːnaː]; born 22 October 1993) is a Burundian professional footballer who plays as a midfielder for NIFL Premiership club Dungannon Swifts which he captains and the Burundi national team.

He began his professional career at Coventry City in 2011 and a year later he signed for Newcastle United of the Premier League. After an aborted move to Rangers, Bigirimana returned to Coventry on loan in 2015 and permanently a year later. He scored for Coventry in their 2017 EFL Trophy Final victory, then signed for Motherwell of the Scottish Premiership. Bigirimana left Motherwell in January 2019 and then had a short spell with Hibernian before returning to England with Solihull Moors in October.

Born in Burundi, Bigirimana moved to the United Kingdom with his family as a refugee in 2004 and chose to represent England at under-20 level in 2013, later representing his country of birth in 2015. He played at the 2019 Africa Cup of Nations.

== Club career ==
=== Coventry City ===
Bigirimana was born in Bujumbura, Burundi but moved to the United Kingdom with his family as a refugee in 2004, having spent time living in Uganda. He was taken on trial having asked at Coventry City's academy training facility.

Graduating from the Sky Blues' youth set-up to sign his first professional deal for the club in the summer of 2011 and playing a role their first team pre-season preparations for the 2011–12 campaign, Bigirimana made his professional debut on 8 August 2011 in a 1–0 Championship defeat by Leicester City, playing the full 90 minutes.

On 12 March 2012, Bigirimana won the Championship Apprentice of the Year Award for the 2011–12 season. He beat Crystal Palace's Jonathan Williams and Reading's Jordan Obita to the award.

=== Newcastle United ===
On 6 July 2012, Bigirimana signed for Premier League club Newcastle United. Their website said it was a five-year contract for an undisclosed fee, believed to be between £500,000 and £1,000,000. His competitive debut came on 23 August, in a 1–1 draw with Greek side Atromitos, in their UEFA Europa League play-off round match, before making his home Premier League debut on 2 September in a 1–1 draw with Aston Villa as a substitute for the injured Danny Simpson. He scored his first professional goal on 3 December to complete a 3–0 home win against Wigan Athletic after two earlier goals by Demba Ba.

On 2 February 2015, Bigirimana signed for Scottish Championship club Rangers on loan until the end of the 2014–15 season. He never made an appearance for the club due to an undisclosed medical condition, leading the then Rangers manager Stuart McCall to suggest the club should never have signed him in the first place.

=== Coventry City (return) ===
On 16 November 2015, Bigirimana returned to Coventry City on an emergency loan until 3 January 2016. His loan was extended until 24 January, following five appearances in the league, with three of them starts. On 14 January, his loan was further extended until the end of the season, with no option to recall.

On 26 August 2016, Bigirimana signed a one-year deal with Coventry. He scored his first goal for the club in a 4–2 EFL Trophy win at Wycombe Wanderers on 9 November 2016. In the 2017 EFL Trophy Final at Wembley Stadium against Oxford United, he started the match and scored the first goal of a 2–1 win.

=== Motherwell ===
Bigirimana signed a two-year contract with Scottish Premiership club Motherwell on 2 June 2017. He made his debut on 15 July in a Scottish League Cup group match away to Queen's Park, starting and assisting a goal by Craig Tanner. On 9 August in the second round of the competition, he scored his first goal for the Well in a 3–2 extra-time win at Ross County.

Three days later Bigirimana made his league debut for the club in a 4–1 loss at St Johnstone. He was substituted for goalkeeper Russell Griffiths when starting goalkeeper Trevor Carson was dismissed, and two more teammates were red-carded. He made 27 league appearances over the campaign, scoring once as a substitute in a 5–1 loss to the same opponents at Fir Park on 5 May 2018.

=== Hibernian ===
Bigirimana moved to Hibernian on 31 January 2019, signing a contract to the end of the 2018–19 season. He made his debut two days later in a 2–1 home loss to Aberdeen, as a 54th-minute substitute for the injured Marvin Bartley. This was his only appearance for Hibernian, and he departed the club in May following the end of his contract.

=== Solihull Moors ===
On 29 October 2019, Bigirimana joined Solihull Moors of the National League on an initial two-month contract. He made his debut the same day, as a 56th-minute substitute during the Scottish Challenge Cup fourth round defeat to Glasgow Rangers Colts.

=== Glentoran ===
On 11 August 2020, Bigirimana completed a move to NIFL Premiership side Glentoran.

He left the Northern Irish club at the end of the 2021–22 season.

=== Young Africans ===
On 19 July 2022, Tanzanian Premier League champions Young Africans announced the signing of Bigirimana.

=== Dungannon Swifts ===
On 1 September 2023, Bigirimana returned to Northern Ireland, joining NIFL Premiership club Dungannon Swifts.

== International career ==
In April 2012, Bigirimana announced that he would like to play for Rwanda at international level. He was later considered by Rwanda for the 2013 African Youth Championship qualification stage. In October, Bigirimana stated that he had rejected an international call-up from Burundi due to political instability in the country.

In May 2013, Bigirimana was called up to the provisional England squad for the 2013 FIFA U-20 World Cup. On 28 May 2013, he was named in the final squad by manager Peter Taylor. He made his debut on 16 June, in a 3–0 win in a warm-up game against Uruguay.

On 15 November 2015, Bigirimana made his debut for Burundi during the 2018 FIFA World Cup qualification as a starter against DR Congo. The match finished 2–2 but FIFA awarded DR Congo a 3–0 win as a result of the fielding of Bigirimana, who was ineligible.

Bigirimana helped Burundi qualify for the 2019 Africa Cup of Nations, the first major tournament in their history. Burundi were knocked out in the group stages, and Bigirimana captained the side in their last match against Guinea. He also earned praise for his performance in the opening game vs Nigeria, and was voted one of the best players of the AFCON group stages by SuperSport.

== Personal life ==
Bigirimana was born in Bujumbura to a Burundian father and a Rwandan mother. He married during the 2016 summer to former Miss Coventry and law graduate, Natalia Leigh. Their first daughter was born on 1 April 2017, 24 hours before the final of the EFL Trophy which Coventry won and Bigirimana scored.

== Career statistics ==
=== Club ===
As of 27 December 2021

Appearances and goals by club, season and competition
Club	Season	League			National Cup (Note: Includes FA Cup, Scottish Cup, Irish Cup)		League Cup (Note: Includes EFL Cup, Scottish League Cup, Northern Ireland Football League Cup)		Other		Total	
Club	Season	Division	Apps	Goals	Apps	Goals	Apps	Goals	Apps	Goals	Apps	Goals
Coventry City	2011–12	Championship	26	0	1	0	1	0	—		28	0
Newcastle United	2012–13	Premier League	13	1	1	0	1	0	9 (Note: Appearances in Europa League)	0	24	1
Newcastle United	2013–14	Premier League	0	0	0	0	1	0	—		1	0
Newcastle United	2014–15	Premier League	0	0	0	0	0	0	—		0	0
Newcastle United	2015–16	Premier League	0	0	0	0	0	0	—		0	0
Newcastle United	Total		13	1	1	0	2	0	9	0	25	1
Rangers (loan)	2014–15	Scottish Championship	0	0	0	0	0	0	0	0	0	0
Coventry City (loan)	2015–16	League One	13	0	0	0	0	0	0	0	13	0
Coventry City	2016–17	League One	30	0	2	0	0	0	7 (Note: Appearances in the EFL Trophy)	2	39	2
Coventry City	Total		43	0	2	0	0	0	7	2	52	2
Motherwell	2017–18	Scottish Premiership	27	1	3	0	6	1	—		36	2
Motherwell	2018–19	Scottish Premiership	19	1	0	0	2	0	—		21	1
Motherwell	Total		46	2	3	0	8	1	—		57	3
Hibernian	2018–19	Scottish Premiership	1	0	0	0	0	0	0	0	1	0
Solihull Moors	2019–20	National League	0	0	0	0	—		1 (Note: Appearances in Scottish Challenge Cup)	0	1	0
Glentoran	2020–21	NIFL Premiership	30	0	2	0	0	0	2 (Note: Appearances in Europa League)	0	34	0
Glentoran	2021–22	NIFL Premiership	13	0	0	0	2	0	2 (Note: Appearances in Conference League)	0	17	0
Glentoran	Total		43	0	2	0	2	0	4	0	51	0
Career total			172	3	9	0	13	1	21	2	215	6

=== International ===
As of match played 16 November 2022

Appearances and goals by national team and year
National team	Year	Apps	Goals
Burundi	2015	1	0
Burundi	2016	—	
Burundi	2017	—	
Burundi	2018	4	0
Burundi	2019	8	0
Burundi	2020	2	0
Burundi	2021	2	0
Burundi	2022	5	0
Total		22	0

== Honours ==
Coventry City

- EFL Trophy: 2016–17

Dungannon Swifts

- Irish Cup: 2024–25

Individual

- Championship Apprentice of the Year Award: 2011–12
