= Callum Roberts (footballer) =

English footballer (born 1997)

Personal information
- Full name: Callum Roberts
- Date of birth: 14 April 1997 (age 29)
- Place of birth: North Shields, England
- Height: 5 ft 8 in (1.73 m)
- Position: Winger

Team information
- Current team: Notts County
- Number: 7

Youth career
- 2005–2015: Newcastle United

Senior career*
Years	Team	Apps	(Gls)
2015–2019	Newcastle United	0	(0)
2015	→ Gateshead (loan)	3	(0)
2017	→ Kilmarnock (loan)	10	(0)
2019	→ Colchester United (loan)	3	(0)
2019–2020	Blyth Spartans	25	(17)
2020–2022	Notts County	52	(20)
2022–2023	Aberdeen	3	(0)
2023–2026	Scunthorpe United	101	(42)
2026–	Notts County	2	(2)

International career
2016	England U20	2	(0)
2022	England C	1	(0)
- * Club domestic league appearances and goals as of 16:35, 29 May 2026 (UTC)

Callum (Cal) Roberts (born 14 April 1997) is an English professional footballer who plays as a winger for EFL League One club Notts County.

== Early career ==
Roberts joined Newcastle United at the age of eight and also played youth football for Whitley Bay Sproggs while attending Churchill Community College in Wallsend.

While still at school during the 2012–13 season, Roberts scored eight goals in nine league appearances for the Newcastle United Under-18s in the 2012–13 Professional U18 Development League.

He officially joined the Newcastle United Academy the following season and made 19 appearances for the Under-18s in the 2013–14 Professional U18 Development League, scoring four goals. He also made two appearances in the FA Youth Cup as Newcastle United reached the Quarter Finals of the competition. He also made the step up to Under-21 level, making ten appearances in the 2013–14 Professional U21 Development League and scoring his first goal at that level in their match against Liverpool at Anfield.

== Club career ==
=== Newcastle United ===
On 3 January 2015, Roberts made his senior debut, coming on as a second-half substitute in an FA Cup match against Leicester City, a match which Leicester City won 1–0. At the end of January 2015, he signed his first professional contract with Newcastle United, committing himself to his hometown club on a long-term deal.

On 15 January 2019, Roberts scored his first goal for Newcastle in a 4–2 FA Cup win against Blackburn Rovers.

He was released by Newcastle after the 2018–19 season.

=== Gateshead (loan) ===
Shortly after making his Newcastle United debut, on 16 January 2015, it was announced that he joined Football Conference side and near-neighbours Gateshead on a month-long loan deal. This deal was later extended to a season-long deal, but he was recalled on 26 February to provide injury cover at Newcastle United, having made three appearances during his spell at Gateshead.

=== Kilmarnock (loan) ===
On 9 January 2017, Roberts moved on loan to Scottish Premiership club Kilmarnock for the remainder of the season, along with Newcastle teammates Freddie Woodman and Sean Longstaff. He made his debut on 21 January 2017, as Kilmarnock lost 1–0 against Hamilton Academical in the Scottish Cup.

=== Colchester United (loan) ===
On 31 January 2019, Roberts joined League Two side Colchester United on loan for the rest of the season. He made his club debut as a substitute in Colchester's 4–0 win at Northampton Town on 2 February. He returned to Newcastle on 13 March 2019.

=== Blyth Spartans ===
Roberts joined Blyth Spartans A.F.C. initially on a non-contract basis in August 2019. An impressive form saw him score nine goals in nine games. This included hat-tricks against Curzon Ashton F.C. during FA Cup qualifying and also against AFC Telford United in the National League North. Roberts subsequently secured a contract with Spartans in October 2019 and went on to score a third hat-trick of the season the following month in a 4–4 draw away to Kettering Town F.C in a league tie. He would go on to score goals in back-back derby matches in the league against Gateshead F.C. during a festive double-header league ties where Spartans won 3–2 away on Boxing Day and drew 2–2 at home on New Year's Day. Roberts left Spartans later in January 2020 moving to Notts County F.C. for an undisclosed fee.

=== Notts County ===
On 20 January 2020, Roberts joined National League side Notts County. He signed until the 2020–21 season. On 13 November 2020 he signed an extension until 2022–23.

=== Aberdeen ===
In July 2022, Roberts signed for Aberdeen for an undisclosed fee on a three-year contract.

=== Scunthorpe United ===
In June 2023, Roberts joined recently relegated National League North side Scunthorpe United for an undisclosed fee. He picked up a National League North Player of the Month award in October 2024, his first award for the club.

=== Return to Notts County ===
On 29 May 2026, it was announced that Roberts had re-signed for EFL League One club Notts County, four years after leaving for Aberdeen, on an initial two-year deal with an option of a further year.

== Career statistics ==
=== Club ===
As of match played 3 May 2026

Appearances and goals by club, season and competition
Club	Season	League			National cup (Note: Includes FA Cup, Scottish Cup)		League cup (Note: Includes EFL Cup, Scottish League Cup)		Other		Total	
Club	Season	Division	Apps	Goals	Apps	Goals	Apps	Goals	Apps	Goals	Apps	Goals
Newcastle United	2014–15	Premier League	0	0	1	0	0	0	—		1	0
Newcastle United	2015–16	Premier League	0	0	0	0	0	0	—		0	0
Newcastle United	2016–17	Championship	0	0	0	0	0	0	—		0	0
Newcastle United	2018–19	Premier League	0	0	1	1	0	0	—		1	1
Newcastle United	Total		0	0	2	1	0	0	—		2	1
Gateshead (loan)	2014–15	Conference Premier	3	0	0	0	—		0	0	3	0
Kilmarnock (loan)	2016–17	Scottish Premiership	10	0	1	0	0	0	—		11	0
Newcastle United U21	2017–18	—			—		—		2 (Note: Appearance(s) in EFL Trophy)	0	2	0
Newcastle United U21	2018–19	—			—		—		5	3	5	3
Newcastle United U21	Total		—		—		—		7	3	7	3
Colchester United (loan)	2018–19	League Two	3	0	—		—		—		3	0
Blyth Spartans	2019–20	National League North	25	17	0	0	—		0	0	25	17
Notts County	2019–20	National League	8	3	0	0	—		2 (Note: Appearance(s) in National League Play-offs)	2	10	5
Notts County	2020–21	National League	9	1	0	0	—		0	0	9	1
Notts County	2021–22	National League	36	16	2	0	—		1	0	39	16
Notts County	Total		53	20	2	0	—		3	2	58	22
Aberdeen	2022–23	Scottish Premiership	3	0	1	0	0	0	—		4	0
Scunthorpe United	2023–24	National League North	17	4	0	0	—		1 (Note: Appearance(s) in National League North Play-offs)	0	18	4
Scunthorpe United	2024–25	National League North	40	20	0	0	—		1	1	41	21
Scunthorpe United	2025–26	National League	40	18	2	1	—		2	1	44	20
Scunthorpe United	Total		97	42	2	1	—		3	2	103	45
Career total			191	79	8	2	0	0	13	7	216	88

== Honours ==
Scunthorpe United

- National League North play-offs: 2025

Individual

- National League North Player of the Month: October 2024
- National League North Team of the Season: 2024–25
- National League Team of the Season: 2025–26
