= Daryl Janmaat =

Dutch footballer (born 1989)

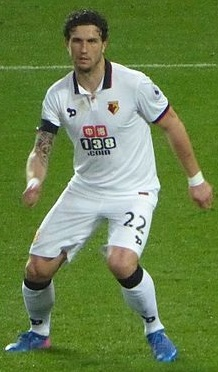
- Janmaat with Watford in 2017

Personal information
- Full name: Daryl Janmaat
- Date of birth: 22 July 1989 (age 37)
- Place of birth: Leidschendam, Netherlands
- Height: 1.85 m (6 ft 1 in)
- Position: Right back

Youth career
- 1995–2007: Feyenoord

Senior career*
Years	Team	Apps	(Gls)
2007–2008	ADO Den Haag	25	(2)
2008–2012	Heerenveen	84	(5)
2012–2014	Feyenoord	63	(5)
2014–2016	Newcastle United	71	(3)
2016–2020	Watford	76	(5)
2020–2022	ADO Den Haag	13	(0)
Total		332	(20)

International career
2009	Netherlands U20	5	(0)
2009–2010	Netherlands U21	11	(0)
2012–2018	Netherlands	34	(0)
Medal record
Representing Netherlands
FIFA World Cup
Third place	2014
- * Club domestic league appearances and goals

Daryl Janmaat (born 22 July 1989) is a Dutch football executive and former professional player who played as a right back. He most recently served as technical director of ADO Den Haag.

Janmaat began his career at ADO Den Haag, and went on to play for Eredivisie clubs Heerenveen and Feyenoord. He then had stints in the Premier League with Newcastle United and Watford, before returning to the Netherlands, where he finished his professional career back at ADO Den Haag, finally retiring in 2022.

A full international between 2012 and 2018, Janmaat earned over 34 caps for the Netherlands and was part of the team which finished third at the 2014 FIFA World Cup.

== Club career ==
=== ADO Den Haag ===
Born in Leidschendam, South Holland, Janmaat started his senior career in 2007–08, with ADO Den Haag in the Eerste Divisie.

=== Heerenveen ===
In the following off-season, the 19-year-old moved straight into the Eredivisie, signing for Heerenveen. In Heerenveen's Europa League match against Hertha Berlin on 23 October 2009, Janmaat came on as a 73rd-minute substitute for Norwegian Christian Grindheim and received a red card three minutes later for a late challenge on Nemanja Pejčinović but Heerenveen held on for a 1–0 victory. After serving a required suspension, Janmaat scored in his next Europa League appearance on 16 December 2009, netting his side's final goal in a 5–0 win over Ventspils at the Abe Lenstra Stadion in Heerenveen but the win proved insufficient as Heerenveen failed to qualify for the knockout stages.

On 21 December 2011, Janmaat scored Heerenveen's ninth goal in an 11–1 thrashing of Eerste Divisie side Oss to reach the quarter-finals of the KNVB Cup. During his four seasons with the club, Janmaat was a starter in three after appearing in only ten games in his debut campaign, which ended with conquest of the KNVB Cup.

=== Feyenoord ===
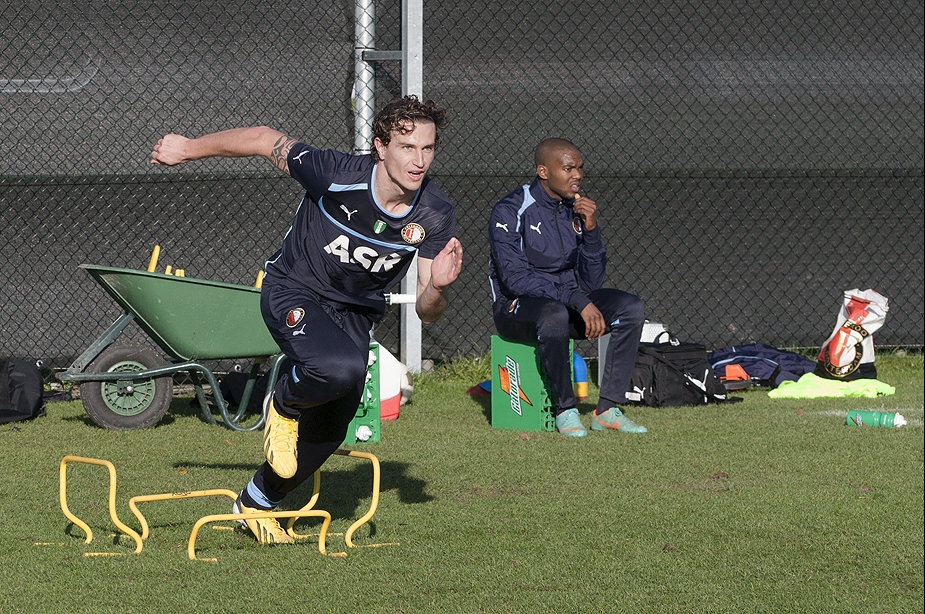
Janmaat during training with Feyenoord, 2012

In the middle of 2012, after his contract expired, he signed for fellow top-division side Feyenoord, which he had already represented as a youth. Janmaat picked up two yellow cards in the space of one minute and was sent off on 9 December 2012 as Feyenoord drew with NAC Breda 2–2 in league play. On 17 March 2013, he scored the winning goal for Feyenoord as they defeated Utrecht 2–1.

Janmaat scored his first goal of the 2013–14 Eredivisie season on 16 February 2014, converting a pass from Graziano Pellè as Feyenoord drew 1–1 with NAC Breda. On 13 April, he scored on the half-volley in the 76th minute as Feyenoord defeated PSV 2–0 in league play.

=== Newcastle United ===
On 17 July 2014, Janmaat joined Premier League club Newcastle United on a six-year deal for an undisclosed fee. He made his competitive debut on 17 August, playing the full 90 minutes as Newcastle began their league campaign with a 2–0 home defeat to Manchester City. On 30 August, Janmaat scored his first goal for the club in a 3–3 draw against Crystal Palace. Over the course of the season, he assisted goals in matches against West Bromwich Albion, Burnley, Crystal Palace and Aston Villa. For his defensive performances, he was announced as Player of the Year by the Newcastle United Supporters Trust.

On 15 August 2015, Janmaat was sent off for two bookable offences against Swansea City, and was therefore unavailable for the following match against Manchester United. On 25 August, and in the second round Football League Cup tie against Northampton Town, he scored the third goal in a 4–1 win. On 19 September, he scored the consolation goal in a 2–1 loss to Watford. On 23 September, he was named captain for the third round League Cup tie against Sheffield Wednesday, but was taken off at half-time, citing illness. He later assisted goals in matches against Norwich City, Crystal Palace and West Ham United.

On 2 March 2016, and after a 1–0 loss away to Stoke City, he was involved in a confrontation with Newcastle supporters. Intending to applaud the travelling supporters, but met with anger instead; he had to be turned away by Jamaal Lascelles. On 9 April, Janmaat was substituted in the first half of a 3–1 loss away to Southampton, having sustained a groin injury. In his frustration, he punched a wall and broke two of his fingers, missing the next four matches for Newcastle. Vurnon Anita replaced him in his absence, and as a result, reports linked him away from the club. He returned to the squad for the penultimate match of the season against Aston Villa, but was not brought on. He was named in the final match of the season against Tottenham Hotspur. By this time, the club were already relegated, but managed to beat Tottenham 5–1, with Janmaat assisting the fourth goal and scoring the fifth goal. A picture of a Newcastle supporter giving Janmaat a reversed two-fingered salute, as the Dutchman wheeled away celebrating his goal was widely circulated on social media.

=== Watford ===
On 24 August 2016, following Newcastle's relegation to the Championship, Janmaat signed for Premier League Watford for a fee of £7.5 million. On 12 October 2020, Watford confirmed that agreement with Janmaat was reached for Janmaat to leave on a free transfer.

=== Return to ADO Den Haag ===
On 29 December 2020, Janmaat signed with ADO Den Haag as a free-agent. After the 2021–22 season, he retired as a player and was appointed technical director of the club.

== International career ==
Janmaat made his debut for the Netherlands on 7 September 2012, playing the full 90 minutes in a 2–0 home win against Turkey for the 2014 FIFA World Cup qualifiers. On 31 May 2014, he was selected by national team manager Louis van Gaal to the final 23-man squad for the World Cup in Brazil. He played his first game in the tournament on 13 June, as Holland thrashed defending champions Spain 5–1. In the third-place playoff match against host nation Brazil, Janmaat came on as a late substitute for Daley Blind and provided the assist for Georginio Wijnaldum as Holland won 3–0.

== Career statistics ==
=== Club ===
Appearances and goals by club, season and competition
Club	Season	League			National cup (Note: Includes KNVB Cup, FA Cup)		League cup (Note: Includes Football League Cup)		Continental		Other		Total	
Club	Season	Division	Apps	Goals	Apps	Goals	Apps	Goals	Apps	Goals	Apps	Goals	Apps	Goals
ADO Den Haag	2007–08	Eerste Divisie	25	2	1	0	—		—		7 (Note: Appearances in Eredivisie play-offs)	1	33	3
Heerenveen	2008–09	Eredivisie	10	0	1	0	—		1 (Note: Appearance in UEFA Cup)	0	—		12	0
Heerenveen	2009–10	Eredivisie	28	0	2	1	—		4 (Note: Appearances in UEFA Europa League)	1	1 (Note: Appearance in Johan Cruijff Shield)	0	35	2
Heerenveen	2010–11	Eredivisie	24	3	1	0	—		—		—		25	3
Heerenveen	2011–12	Eredivisie	22	2	5	1	—		—		—		27	3
Heerenveen	Total		84	7	9	2	—		5	1	1	0	99	8
Feyenoord	2012–13	Eredivisie	33	3	2	0	—		4 (Note: Two appearances in UEFA Champions League, two appearances in UEFA Europa League)	0	—		39	3
Feyenoord	2013–14	Eredivisie	30	2	4	0	—		1	0	—		35	2
Feyenoord	Total		63	5	6	0	—		5	0	—		74	5
Newcastle United	2014–15	Premier League	37	1	0	0	3	0	—		—		40	1
Newcastle United	2015–16	Premier League	32	2	1	0	2	1	—		—		35	3
Newcastle United	2016–17	Championship	2	0	—		—		—		—		2	0
Newcastle United	Total		71	3	1	0	5	1	–		—		77	4
Watford	2016–17	Premier League	27	2	1	0	—		—		—		28	2
Watford	2017–18	Premier League	23	3	2	0	0	0	—		—		25	3
Watford	2018–19	Premier League	18	0	4	0	0	0	—		—		22	0
Watford	2019–20	Premier League	8	0	0	0	2	1	—		—		10	1
Watford	Total		76	5	7	0	2	1	—		—		85	6
ADO Den Haag	2020–21	Eredivisie	4	0	0	0	—		—		—		4	0
ADO Den Haag	2021–22	Eerste Divisie	9	0	1	0	—		—		—		10	0
ADO Den Haag	2022–23	Eerste Divisie	2	0	0	0	—		—		—		2	0
ADO Den Haag	Total		15	0	1	0	—		—		—		16	0
Career total			334	20	25	2	7	2	10	1	8	1	384	26

=== International ===
Appearances and goals by national team and year

National team	Year	Apps	Goals
Netherlands	2012	3	0
Netherlands	2013	10	0
Netherlands	2014	10	0
Netherlands	2015	4	0
Netherlands	2016	1	0
Netherlands	2017	2	0
Netherlands	2018	4	0
Netherlands	Total	34	0

== Honours ==
Watford

- FA Cup runner-up: 2018–19

Netherlands

- FIFA World Cup third place: 2014

Individual

- Newcastle United Player of the Year: 2014–15
- North-East FWA Player of the Year: 2015
