= Mackenzie Heaney =

English footballer (born 1999)

Personal information
- Date of birth: 2 January 1999 (age 27)
- Place of birth: England
- Position: Midfielder

Team information
- Current team: South Shields

Senior career*
Years	Team	Apps	(Gls)
2018	Benfield		
2019–2020	West Auckland Town		
2020	Grindavík	7	(1)
2020–2021	Whitby Town		
2021–2022	York City	14	(2)
2022	→ Buxton (loan)		
2022–	South Shields	22	(0)
- * Club domestic league appearances and goals

Mackenzie Heaney (born 2 January 1999) is an English footballer who plays as a midfielder for South Shields.

== Early life ==
Heaney joined the youth academy of English Premier League side Newcastle at the age of twelve.

== Club career ==
Heaney played for English side Buxton, helping the club win the league. After that, he played for English side South Shields, where he was regarded as one of the club's most important players.

== International career ==
Heaney represented Scotland and England internationally at youth level.

== Style of play ==
Heaney mainly operates as a midfielder and is left-footed.

== Personal life ==
Heaney is a native of Walker, England.
