= Liam Smith (footballer, born 1995) =

English footballer

Personal information
- Full name: Liam Phillip Smith
- Date of birth: 28 September 1995 (age 31)
- Place of birth: South Shields, England
- Height: 5 ft 11 in (1.80 m)
- Position: Midfielder

Youth career
- 2002–2018: Newcastle United

Senior career*
Years	Team	Apps	(Gls)
2015–2018	Newcastle United	0	(0)
2016	→ Blackpool (loan)	8	(0)
2016	→ Crewe Alexandra (loan)	0	(0)
2021–2022	Hebburn Town	3	(0)
2022–2023	Ashington		
- * Club domestic league appearances and goals as of 23 August 2024

Liam Phillip Smith (born 28 September 1995) is an English professional footballer who plays as a midfielder.

== Career ==
Smith graduated from the Newcastle United Academy in 2015, signing his first professional contract with the club.

In March 2016, Smith joined Blackpool on a two-month youth loan deal. He made his professional debut in Blackpool's match against Coventry City in March 2016, and played seven further games.

In July 2016, Smith was signed on loan through to January 2017 by Crewe Alexandra, though he suffered an ankle injury during pre-season and returned to Newcastle for treatment, returning to Crewe in September. He suffered a second ankle injury shortly after his return to Crewe Alexandra and returned to Newcastle United, having made no appearances for the League Two side. In August 2017, Smith played for Newcastle United U21s in an EFL Trophy group stage game against Crewe at Gresty Road, and scored his side's opening goal in the 4th minute of a 2–1 win.

Smith was released by Newcastle in 2018. After several years without a club, he joined Hebburn Town on 3 November 2021.

In August 2022, Smith joined Northern League Division One club Ashington.

== Career statistics ==
As of 19 July 2016.

Appearances and goals by club, season and competition
Club	Season	League			FA Cup		League Cup		Other		Total	
Club	Season	Division	Apps	Goals	Apps	Goals	Apps	Goals	Apps	Goals	Apps	Goals
Newcastle United	2015–16	Premier League	0	0	0	0	0	0	0	0	0	0
Blackpool (loan)	2015–16	League One	8	0	0	0	0	0	0	0	8	0
Crewe Alexandra (loan)	2016–17	League Two	0	0	0	0	0	0	0	0	0	0
Career total			8	0	0	0	0	0	0	0	8	0
