= Tom Heardman =

English footballer

Personal information
- Date of birth: 12 September 1995 (age 31)
- Place of birth: Gosforth, England
- Position: Forward

Youth career
- Newcastle United

Senior career*
Years	Team	Apps	(Gls)
2014–2018	Newcastle United	0	(0)
2014	→ Gateshead (loan)	3	(0)
2016	→ Hartlepool United (loan)	2	(0)
2017	→ Bury (loan)	0	(0)
Total		5	(0)
- * Club domestic league appearances and goals

Tom Heardman (born 12 September 1995) is an English professional footballer who played as a striker.

== Career ==
Heardman began his career with Newcastle United and joined League Two side Hartlepool United on loan in August 2016. He made his professional debut on 27 September 2016 in a 1–1 draw with Luton Town. He joined Bury on a season-long loan in July 2017, but returned before the end of August.

At the end of 2017/18 season, Heardman was released by Newcastle United.

== Career statistics ==
Appearances and goals by club, season and competition
Club	Season	League			FA Cup		League Cup		Other		Total	
Club	Season	Division	Apps	Goals	Apps	Goals	Apps	Goals	Apps	Goals	Apps	Goals
Gateshead (loan)	2014–15	Conference Premier	3	0	0	0	—		0	0	3	0
Hartlepool United (loan)	2016–17	League Two	2	0	0	0	0	0	1 (Note: Appearance in the EFL Trophy)	0	3	0
Career total			5	0	0	0	0	0	1	0	6	0
