= John Carver (footballer) =

English footballer and manager

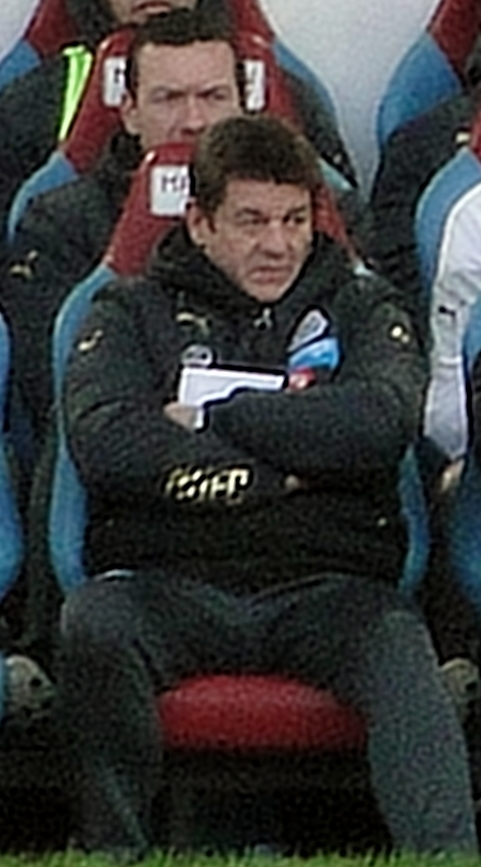
- Carver with Newcastle United in 2014

Personal information
- Full name: John William Carver
- Date of birth: 16 January 1965 (age 61)
- Place of birth: Newcastle upon Tyne, England
- Position: Defender

Team information
- Current team: Radomiak Radom (manager)

Youth career
- –1983: Newcastle United

Senior career*
Years	Team	Apps	(Gls)
1983–1985	Newcastle United	0	(0)
1985–1986	Cardiff City	13	(0)
1987–1990	Gateshead	113	(10)
Total		126	(10)

Managerial career
- 1988: Gateshead (caretaker)
- 2004: Newcastle United (caretaker)
- 2006: Leeds United (caretaker)
- 2008–2009: Toronto FC
- 2010: Sheffield United (caretaker)
- 2015: Newcastle United (interim)
- 2016–2017: Omonia Nicosia
- 2024–2026: Lechia Gdańsk
- 2026–: Radomiak Radom
- * Club domestic league appearances and goals

John William Carver (born 16 January 1965) is an English professional football manager and former player. He is currently in charge of Ekstraklasa club Radomiak Radom.

At Newcastle United, he held assistant coaching roles under Bobby Robson and Alan Pardew, and was the interim manager following Pardew's departure. Away from Newcastle, he was also assistant coach to Kevin Blackwell at Leeds United and Luton Town, as well as at Plymouth Argyle under Paul Mariner, at West Bromwich Albion under Alan Pardew, and the Scotland national team from 2020 to 2025. As manager, he previously took charge of Toronto FC from 2008 to 2009, Omonia Nicosia from 2016 to 2017 and Lechia Gdańsk from 2024 to 2026.

== Playing career ==
Carver was born in Newcastle upon Tyne, and was raised in Cruddas Park. Carver joined Montagu and North Fenham Boys Club when he was nine, which led to him being signed by his hometown club, Newcastle United, as an apprentice when he was 16. He signed a professional contract with the club in January 1983 but never made his league debut, and was released in 1985.

Carver then spent a season at Cardiff City, making 13 appearances, but a thigh injury ended his professional career at the age of 20. Afterwards, he played semi-professional football for Gateshead from 1987 to 1990, whilst working his way up the coaching ladder in Newcastle, starting out in schools before landing the role of director at Newcastle's School of Excellence in 1992.

== Coaching career ==
=== Newcastle United ===
Carver was the assistant manager to Bobby Robson at Newcastle United. Following Robson's sacking in August 2004, Carver was appointed caretaker manager and guided the team to a 3–0 win against Blackburn Rovers. Carver later dedicated the win to Robson. Despite the victory, Carver was not considered for the permanent job, that position going to Graeme Souness who opted to bring in his own backroom staff; Carver left the club in September 2004.

=== Leeds United ===
In July 2005, Leeds United appointed Carver as a first team coach, replacing the departed Adrian Boothroyd who left the club to be the new manager of Watford. He was part of the management team of Kevin Blackwell and Sam Ellis. Following the exit of Ellis in May 2006, Carver was promoted to the position of assistant manager.

Carver became a caretaker manager for the second time in his career, after Leeds fired Kevin Blackwell following a poor start to the season. Carver celebrated a win in his first game in charge after beating Birmingham City 3–2. However, a series of heavy defeats under Carver's management, culminating in a 5–1 drubbing by Luton Town, led to Leeds' chairman Ken Bates opting instead to recruit the Swindon management team of Dennis Wise and Gus Poyet. Carver left Leeds on 23 October 2006, with David Geddis briefly taking charge of caretaker duties.

=== Luton Town ===
Kevin Blackwell subsequently became the manager of Luton Town, and he recruited Carver as his assistant, along with another ex-Leeds coach Sam Ellis. With Luton going through major financial difficulties, including the administrator's decision to sell players from under the management's feet, Carver, along with Blackwell and Ellis were sacked.

=== Toronto FC ===
On 1 February 2008, Carver became head coach of the Major League Soccer (MLS) side Toronto FC, with previous coach, Mo Johnston, remaining as manager and director of soccer. He was thereby reunited with an old friend from Newcastle United, since Paul Winsper had been hired in January as strength and conditioning coach.

In April 2009, Carver was charged $750 by MLS for openly criticising the standard of refereeing during a 3–2 loss away to FC Dallas. He was absent from the bench during a 1–0 home win over Chivas USA four days later and eventually resigned on 25 April 2009, one day before the team's home clash with Kansas City Wizards.

=== Plymouth Argyle and Sheffield United ===
In December 2009, Carver was appointed assistant head coach to Paul Mariner at Plymouth Argyle. On 14 January 2010, he rejected an approach from Burnley manager Brian Laws to join the Lancashire club as a coach, stating his desire to repay the loyalty shown by Paul Mariner and the club as his reason for staying.

In August 2010, Carver was appointed first team coach at Sheffield United by manager Gary Speed, who had played under Carver when he was assistant manager at Newcastle United. This appointment reunited Carver with Sam Ellis, who was assistant to Speed. Following Speed's departure from Sheffield United to become coach of the Wales national team on 14 December, Carver was appointed as caretaker manager. He left the club on 30 December 2010, when Micky Adams was appointed as manager.

=== Return to Newcastle United ===
On 18 January 2011, Newcastle United announced that Carver would be their new assistant manager until the end of the season. Manager Alan Pardew said it was only a short-term deal to see how the two worked together and if he worked well with the set-up. On 25 February, he signed a new five-and-a-half-year contract with Newcastle.

On 17 March 2013, Carver was sent to the stands by the match officials at half-time during Newcastle's match at Wigan Athletic. His reaction towards Wigan player Callum McManaman followed a high tackle on Newcastle's defender Massadio Haïdara, which saw Haïdara stretchered off and McManaman escape any punishment. Carver was fined £1,000 and warned as to his future conduct as a result.

Following Pardew's interest in the Crystal Palace job, Carver was put in temporary charge for Newcastle's next two matches against Burnley in the Premier League and Leicester City in the FA Cup. On 3 January 2015, and after Pardew's appointment at Crystal Palace was confirmed and soon after Newcastle's FA Cup exit, Carver put himself forward for the job, but urged the board to find a replacement after a 2–1 loss to Southampton on 17 January.

On 26 January, it was confirmed that Carver had been appointed temporary head coach until the end of the 2014–15 season. During his spell as caretaker manager, he had accrued three losses and a draw in all competitions. Five days after Carver was named the temporary head coach until the end of the season, he won his first match on 31 January, against Hull City. From 4 March to 2 May, he oversaw a run of eight successive league defeats, a club record for Newcastle in the Premier League. Despite such heavy losses, Carver still believed that he was "the best coach in the Premier League", though he later claimed that his words were taken out of context by the media after receiving widespread hilarity for his statement.

On the final day of the season, Newcastle beat West Ham United 2–0 to confirm their safety in the Premier League for the 2014–15 season. On 9 June, both Carver and coach Steve Stone had their contracts terminated by Newcastle ahead of the announcement of Steve McClaren as new head coach.

=== Omonia ===
On 4 June 2016, Carver was announced as the new manager of Cypriot club Omonia. On 23 February 2017, Carver was sacked by the club.

=== Scotland ===
On 31 August 2020, it was announced that Carver had joined Steve Clarke's coaching team with the Scotland national team. He replaced Alex Dyer, who had become permanent manager at Kilmarnock.

=== Lechia Gdańsk ===
On 30 November 2024, Carver was announced as the new manager of Polish Ekstraklasa club Lechia Gdańsk, placed 17th out of 18 teams at the time of his appointment, where he was reunited with Kevin Blackwell, the club's technical director. Carver signed a deal until the end of the season with an option for a further year. As part of Lechia's agreement with the Scottish Football Association, he would continue in his role as an assistant of the Scotland national team until the March 2025 international break.

Despite a transfer ban, financial arrears and an organizational turmoil within the club, Carver led Lechia out of the relegation zone and secured their survival with two games left to go. For his efforts, he was nominated for the Ekstraklasa Coach of the Season award.

Lechia started the 2025–26 season with a five-point deduction for the previous season's violations. On 23 May 2026, Lechia were relegated to the I liga after losing 3–2 to Bruk-Bet Termalica Nieciecza in the last round of the season and finishing 16th. During the post-match press conference, Carver announced his departure from the club.

=== Radomiak Radom ===
On 29 September 2026, Carver was appointed manager of another Ekstraklasa club Radomiak Radom on a deal until the end of the season, becoming their third full-time manager since the start of the 2026–27 campaign. In his first game in charge, Radomiak lost 3–2 at home to Motor Lublin on 12 October.

== Managerial statistics ==
As of match played 21 November 2026

Managerial record by team and tenure
Team	From	To	Record				
Team	From	To	P	W	D	L	Win %
Newcastle United (caretaker)	30 August 2004	12 September 2004	1	1	0	0	100.0
Leeds United (caretaker)	21 September 2006	23 October 2006	5	1	0	4	20.0
Toronto FC	1 February 2008	25 April 2009	40	12	12	16	30.0
Sheffield United (caretaker)	14 December 2010	30 December 2010	3	1	0	2	33.3
Newcastle United (interim)	1 January 2015	9 June 2015	20	3	4	13	15.0
Omonia	4 June 2016	23 February 2017	30	17	8	5	56.7
Lechia Gdańsk	30 November 2024	23 May 2026	54	22	9	23	40.7
Radomiak Radom	29 September 2026	Present	7	2	1	4	28.6
Total			160	59	34	67	36.9
