= 2005–06 Deportivo de La Coruña season =

Deportivo de La Coruña
2005–06 season
- President: Augusto César Lendoiro
- Manager: Joaquín Caparrós
- Stadium: Estadio Riazor
- La Liga: 8th
- Copa del Rey: Semi-finals
- UEFA Intertoto Cup: Finals
- Top goalscorer: League: Diego Tristán (12); All: Diego Tristán (13)
Home colours	Away colours	Third colours

The 2005–06 season was Deportivo de La Coruña's 35th season in La Liga, the top division of Spanish football. They also competed in the Copa del Rey and the UEFA Intertoto Cup. The season covered the period 1 July 2005 to 30 June 2006.

== Season summary ==
The season began with Deportivo searching for a new manager, following the departure of Javier Irureta after seven highly successful seasons. He was replaced by Joaquín Caparrós, who joined from Sevilla. Caparrós lead Depor to 8th in his first La Liga campaign, the same result as Irureta had achieved the previous year.

Greater success was to be had in cup competitions, as they reached the semi-finals of the Copa del Rey for the first time since 2002–03, before being defeated by eventual champions Espanyol. They also reached the final stage of the 2005 UEFA Intertoto Cup, where they lost to French side Olympique de Marseille.

== Kit ==
Deportivo's kit was manufactured by Joma and sponsored by Fadesa.

== Players ==
=== Squad ===
Retrieved on 31 March 2021

Note: Flags indicate national team as defined under FIFA eligibility rules; some limited exceptions apply. Players may hold more than one non-FIFA nationality.

No.	Pos.	Nation	Player
1	GK	ESP	José Francisco Molina
2	DF	ESP	Manuel Pablo
3	DF	ESP	Enrique Romero
4	MF	ARG	Aldo Duscher
5	DF	ESP	César Martín
6	MF	CAN	Julian de Guzman
7	FW	URU	Sebastián Taborda
8	MF	ESP	Sergio
9	FW	ESP	Diego Tristán
10	MF	ESP	Momo
10	FW	ESP	Javier Arizmendi
11	FW	ESP	Pedro Munitis
12	MF	ESP	Paco Gallardo (on loan from Sevilla)
13	GK	URU	Gustavo Munúa
14	DF	POR	Jorge Andrade

No.	Pos.	Nation	Player
15	DF	ESP	Joan Capdevila
16	MF	PAR	Roberto Acuña
17	FW	ESP	Rubén Castro
18	MF	ESP	Víctor Sánchez
19	MF	ESP	Jesús Muñoz
21	MF	ESP	Juan Carlos Valerón
22	DF	ESP	Juanma
23	DF	ARG	Fabricio Coloccini
24	DF	ESP	Héctor
25	GK	ESP	Dani Mallo
35	MF	ESP	Iván Carril
35	FW	ESP	Rubén Rivera
36	FW	ESP	Xisco
41	MF	ESP	Iago Iglesias
—	GK	ESP	Ian Mackay

==== Left club during season ====
Note: Flags indicate national team as defined under FIFA eligibility rules; some limited exceptions apply. Players may hold more than one non-FIFA nationality.

No.	Pos.	Nation	Player
12	MF	ARG	Lionel Scaloni (on loan to West Ham United)
19	FW	ESP	Albert Luque (to Newcastle United)

No.	Pos.	Nation	Player
20	DF	ESP	Pablo Amo (on loan to Real Valladolid)
40	FW	ESP	Senel (on loan to Málaga B)

=== Squad stats ===
Last updated on 30 March 2021.

No.	Pos	Nat	Player	Total		La Liga		Copa del Rey		Intertoto Cup	
No.	Pos	Nat	Player	Apps	Goals	Apps	Goals	Apps	Goals	Apps	Goals
1	GK	(Spain) ESP	José Francisco Molina	52	0	38	0	6	0	8	0
2	DF	(Spain) ESP	Manuel Pablo	43	0	28+3	0	4+1	0	7	0
3	DF	(Spain) ESP	Enrique Romero	30	0	17+2	0	1+3	0	7	0
4	MF	(Argentina) ARG	Aldo Duscher	41	0	31	0	6	0	4	0
5	DF	(Spain) ESP	César Martín	9	0	2+5	0	0+1	0	1	0
6	MF	(Canada) CAN	Julian de Guzman	30	1	17+5	1	1+3	0	2+2	0
7	FW	(Uruguay) URU	Sebastián Taborda	9	1	0+9	1	0	0	0	0
8	MF	(Spain) ESP	Sergio	48	6	31+5	4	3+3	1	6	1
9	FW	(Spain) ESP	Diego Tristán	44	13	27+9	12	1+2	0	4+1	1
10	MF	(Spain) ESP	Momo	6	0	1+4	0	0	0	0+1	0
10	FW	(Spain) ESP	Javier Arizmendi	23	2	12+5	2	6	0	0	0
11	FW	(Spain) ESP	Pedro Munitis	46	4	32+1	2	6	1	7	1
12	MF	(Spain) ESP	Paco Gallardo	7	0	1+6	0	0	0	0	0
13	GK	(Uruguay) URU	Gustavo Munúa	0	0	0	0	0	0	0	0
14	DF	(Portugal) POR	Jorge Andrade	28	4	18	1	4	0	6	3
15	DF	(Spain) ESP	Joan Capdevila	49	4	36	4	6	0	7	0
16	MF	(Paraguay) PAR	Roberto Acuña	7	1	0+4	0	0	0	1+2	1
17	FW	(Spain) ESP	Rubén Castro	33	8	13+11	3	1	1	5+3	4
18	MF	(Spain) ESP	Víctor Sánchez	31	6	18+3	3	3+1	2	5+1	1
19	MF	(Spain) ESP	Jesús Muñoz	1	0	0+1	0	0	0	0	0
21	MF	(Spain) ESP	Juan Carlos Valerón	29	6	17+3	5	3	1	3+3	0
22	DF	(Spain) ESP	Juanma	31	4	22+1	4	5	0	2+1	0
23	DF	(Argentina) ARG	Fabricio Coloccini	32	0	23+3	0	6	0	0	0
24	DF	(Spain) ESP	Héctor	21	1	15	0	1+1	0	2+2	1
25	GK	(Spain) ESP	Dani Mallo	1	0	0+1	0	0	0	0	0
35	MF	(Spain) ESP	Iván Carril	15	2	1+9	1	1	0	1+3	1
35	FW	(Spain) ESP	Rubén Rivera	0	0	0	0	0	0	0	0
36	FW	(Spain) ESP	Xisco	15	2	1+10	1	0+2	0	2	1
41	MF	(Spain) ESP	Iago Iglesias	12	2	8+3	2	0+1	0	0	0
	GK	(Spain) ESP	Ian Mackay	0	0	0	0	0	0	0	0
Players who have left the club after the start of the season:
12	MF	(Argentina) ARG	Lionel Scaloni	25	1	8+7	0	2+1	1	5+2	0
19	FW	(Spain) ESP	Albert Luque	4	0	0	0	0	0	3+1	0
20	DF	(Spain) ESP	Pablo Amo	0	0	0	0	0	0	0	0
40	FW	(Spain) ESP	Senel	4	0	1+2	0	0+1	0	0	0

== Competitions ==
=== La Liga ===
Pos	Team	Pld	W	D	L	GF	GA	GD	Pts	Qualification or relegation
6	Celta Vigo	38	20	4	14	45	33	+12	64	Qualification for the UEFA Cup first round
7	Villarreal	38	14	15	9	50	39	+11	57	Qualification for the Intertoto Cup third round
8	Deportivo La Coruña	38	15	10	13	47	45	+2	55	
9	Getafe	38	15	9	14	54	49	+5	54	
10	Atlético Madrid	38	13	13	12	45	37	+8	52	

Source: LFP
Rules for classification: 1st points; 2nd head-to-head points; 3rd head-to-head goal difference; 4th head-to-head goals scored; 5th goal difference; 6th number of goals scored; 7th Fair-play points

=== UEFA Intertoto Cup ===
==== Second round ====
2 July 2005 First leg	Deportivo La Coruña (Spain)	3 – 0	(Serbia and Montenegro) Budućnost Podgorica	A Coruña, Spain
20:15	Xisco 5'; Sergio 81'; Héctor 86'	Report		Stadium: Estadio Riazor; Attendance: 5,000; Referee: Bruno Derrien (France)

9 July 2005 Second leg	Budućnost Podgorica (Serbia and Montenegro)	2 – 1	(Spain) Deportivo La Coruña	Podgorica, Serbia and Montenegro
19:00	Sekulić 65'; Vujović 87'	Report	90+' Acuña	Stadium: Podgorica City Stadium; Attendance: 10,000; Referee: Ferenc Bede (Hungary)

Deportivo La Coruña won 4–2 on aggregate

==== Third round ====
16 July 2005 First leg	Deportivo La Coruña (Spain)	1 – 0	(Croatia) Slaven Belupo	A Coruña, Spain
20:00	Castro 73'	Report		Stadium: Estadio Riazor; Attendance: 5,000; Referee: Bülent Demirlek (Turkey)

23 July 2005 Second leg	Slaven Belupo (Croatia)	0 – 3	(Spain) Deportivo La Coruña	Koprivnica, Croatia
16:00		Report	18' Castro; 46' (pen.) Víctor Sánchez; 80' Tristán	Stadium: Gradski stadion Attendance: 5,000; Referee: Nicolai Vollquartz (Denmark)

Deportivo La Coruña won 4–0 on aggregate

==== Semi-finals ====
27 July 2005 First leg	Deportivo La Coruña (Spain)	2 – 1	(England) Newcastle United	A Coruña, Spain
21:00	Castro 11'; Andrade 57'	Report	47' Bowyer	Stadium: Estadio Riazor; Attendance: 12,000; Referee: Serge Gumienny (Belgium)

3 August 2005 Second leg	Newcastle United (England)	1 – 2	(Spain) Deportivo La Coruña	Newcastle upon Tyne, England
20:45	Milner 39'	Report	45' Andrade; 47' Munitis	Stadium: St James' Park; Attendance: 34,215; Referee: Helmut Fleischer (Germany)

Deportivo La Coruña won 4–2 on aggregate

==== Finals ====
9 August 2005 First leg	Deportivo La Coruña (Spain)	2 – 0	(France) Olympique de Marseille	A Coruña, Spain
21:00	Castro 68'; Carril 87'	Report		Stadium: Estadio Riazor; Attendance: 10,000; Referee: Jaroslav Jara (Czech Republic)

23 August 2005 Second leg	Olympique de Marseille (France)	5 – 1	(Spain) Deportivo La Coruña	Marseille, France
21:00	Ribéry 5'; Méïté 65'; Niang 74', 88'; Oruma 90+3'	Report	9' Andrade	Stadium: Stade Vélodrome; Attendance: 50,000; Referee: Nikolai Ivanov (Russia)

Olympique de Marseille won 5–3 on aggregate

== See also ==
- 2005–06 La Liga
- 2005–06 Copa del Rey
- 2005 UEFA Intertoto Cup
