= 2011–12 SS Lazio season =

Lazio
2011–12 season
- Owner: Claudio Lotito
- Chairman: Claudio Lotito
- Manager: Edoardo Reja
- Stadium: Stadio Olimpico
- Serie A: 4th
- Coppa Italia: Quarter-finals
- UEFA Europa League: Round of 32
- Top goalscorer: League: Miroslav Klose (13); All: Miroslav Klose (16)
- Highest home attendance: 57,148 (vs Juventus, 26 November 2011)
- Lowest home attendance: 8,295 (vs Sporting CP, 14 December 2011)
- Average home league attendance: 29,439
| Home colours | Away colours | Third colours |

The 2011–12 season was the 112th season in Società Sportiva Lazio's history and their club's 24th consecutive season in the top-flight of Italian football. The club competed in Serie A, the Coppa Italia, and the UEFA Europa League.

== Pre-season ==
During the pre-season, Lazio purchased Djibril Cissé from Panathinaikos, Miroslav Klose from Bayern Munich, Abdoulay Konko from Genoa, Lorik Cana from Galatasaray and Senad Lulić from Young Boys. They also sold Stephan Lichtsteiner to Juventus for €10 million and purchased goalkeeper Federico Marchetti from Cagliari. They then sold goalkeeper Fernando Muslera to Galatasaray.

== Players ==
=== Squad information ===
As of 31 January 2012.

Note: Flags indicate national team as defined under FIFA eligibility rules; some limited exceptions apply. Players may hold more than one non-FIFA nationality.

| No. | Pos. | Nation | Player |
|---|---|---|---|
| 1 | GK | ARG | Albano Bizzarri |
| 3 | DF | BRA | André Dias |
| 5 | DF | ARG | Lionel Scaloni |
| 6 | MF | ITA | Stefano Mauri (vice-captain) |
| 8 | MF | BRA | Hernanes |
| 9 | FW | ITA | Tommaso Rocchi (captain) |
| 11 | MF | BRA | Matuzalém |
| 14 | DF | ESP | Javier Garrido |
| 15 | MF | URU | Álvaro González |
| 16 | GK | ITA | Alessandro Berardi |
| 18 | FW | CZE | Libor Kozák |
| 19 | MF | BIH | Senad Lulić |
| 20 | DF | ITA | Giuseppe Biava |
| 21 | DF | FRA | Modibo Diakité |
| 22 | GK | ITA | Federico Marchetti |
| 24 | MF | ITA | Cristian Ledesma |

| No. | Pos. | Nation | Player |
|---|---|---|---|
| 25 | FW | GER | Miroslav Klose |
| 26 | DF | ROU | Ștefan Radu |
| 27 | MF | ALB | Lorik Cana |
| 28 | FW | NGR | Stephen Makinwa |
| 29 | DF | FRA | Abdoulay Konko |
| 30 | FW | URU | Emiliano Alfaro |
| 32 | MF | ITA | Cristian Brocchi |
| 33 | DF | LTU | Marius Stankevičius |
| 40 | DF | ITA | Luca Crescenzi |
| 41 | MF | ITA | Enrico Zampa |
| 53 | FW | ITA | Antonio Rozzi |
| 78 | DF | ITA | Luciano Zauri |
| 87 | MF | ITA | Antonio Candreva |
| — | DF | ITA | Federico Chirico |
| — | DF | ITA | Ivan Artipoli |

== Transfers ==
=== In ===
| Date | Pos. | Player | Moving from | Fee |
|---|---|---|---|---|
| 8 June 2011 | FW | (Germany) Miroslav Klose | (Germany) Bayern Munich | Free |
| 16 June 2011 | MF | (Bosnia and Herzegovina) Senad Lulić | (Switzerland) Young Boys | €3,000,000 |
| 23 June 2011 | DF | (Lithuania) Marius Stankevičius | (Italy) Sampdoria | Undisclosed |
| 1 July 2011 | GK | (Italy) Federico Marchetti | (Italy) Cagliari | €5,000,000 |
| 4 July 2011 | DF | (France) Abdoulay Konko | (Italy) Genoa | €6,000,000 |
| 12 July 2011 | FW | (France) Djibril Cissé | (Greece) Panathinaikos | €5,800,000 |
| 15 July 2011 | MF | (Albania) Lorik Cana | (Turkey) Galatasaray | Undisclosed |
| 12 January 2012 | FW | (Uruguay) Emiliano Alfaro | (Uruguay) Liverpool | €3,200,000 |
| 31 January 2012 | MF | (Italy) Antonio Candreva | (Italy) Udinese | Loan |

=== Out ===
| Date | Pos. | Player | Moving to | Fee |
|---|---|---|---|---|
| 1 July 2011 | DF | (Switzerland) Stephan Lichtsteiner | (Italy) Juventus | €10,000,000 |
| 19 July 2011 | GK | (Uruguay) Fernando Muslera | (Turkey) Galatasaray | Undisclosed |
| 9 August 2011 | MF | (Australia) Mark Bresciano | (United Arab Emirates) Al-Nasr | €3,900,000 |
| 31 August 2011 | FW | (Argentina) Mauro Zárate | (Italy) Internazionale | Loan |
| 31 August 2011 | FW | (Italy) Pasquale Foggia | (Italy) Sampdoria | Loan |
| 31 August 2011 | FW | (Italy) Sergio Floccari | (Italy) Parma | Loan |
| 18 January 2012 | DF | (Italy) Guglielmo Stendardo | (Italy) Atalanta | Loan |
| 18 January 2012 | FW | (Italy) Giuseppe Sculli | (Italy) Genoa | Loan |
| 31 January 2012 | GK | (Argentina) Juan Pablo Carrizo | (Italy) Catania | Loan |
| 31 January 2012 | DF | (Belgium) Luis Pedro Cavanda | (Italy) Bari | Loan |
| 31 January 2012 | MF | (Italy) Simone Del Nero | (Italy) Cesena | Loan |
| 31 January 2012 | FW | (France) Djibril Cissé | (England) Queens Park Rangers | £4,000,000 |

== Competitions ==
=== Serie A ===
==== League table ====
| Pos | Team | Pld | W | D | L | GF | GA | GD | Pts | Qualification or relegation |
|---|---|---|---|---|---|---|---|---|---|---|
| 2 | Milan | 38 | 24 | 8 | 6 | 74 | 33 | +41 | 80 | Qualification to Champions League group stage |
| 3 | Udinese | 38 | 18 | 10 | 10 | 52 | 35 | +17 | 64 | Qualification to Champions League play-off round |
| 4 | Lazio | 38 | 18 | 8 | 12 | 56 | 47 | +9 | 62 | Qualification to Europa League play-off round |
| 5 | Napoli | 38 | 16 | 13 | 9 | 66 | 46 | +20 | 61 | Qualification to Europa League group stage (Note: Napoli qualified to the group stage of the Europa League as winner of the 2011–12 Coppa Italia. As they finished fifth, the sixth-placed team of the league also qualified for the Europa League.) |
| 6 | Internazionale | 38 | 17 | 7 | 14 | 58 | 55 | +3 | 58 | Qualification to Europa League third qualifying round |

Source: Lega Serie A
Rules for classification: 1) points; 2) head-to-head points; 3) head-to-head goal difference; 4) head-to-head goals scored; 5) goal difference; 6) number of goals scored

==== Results summary ====
| Overall | | | | | | | | Home | | | | | | Away | | | | | |
| Pld | W | D | L | GF | GA | GD | Pts | W | D | L | GF | GA | GD | W | D | L | GF | GA | GD |
|---|---|---|---|---|---|---|---|---|---|---|---|---|---|---|---|---|---|---|---|
| 38 | 18 | 8 | 12 | 56 | 47 | +9 | 62 | 10 | 6 | 3 | 28 | 16 | +12 | 8 | 2 | 9 | 28 | 31 | −3 |

Last updated: 13 May 2012.
Source: Soccernet

==== Results by round ====
| Round | 1 | 2 | 3 | 4 | 5 | 6 | 7 | 8 | 9 | 10 | 11 | 12 | 13 | 14 | 15 | 16 | 17 | 18 | 19 | 20 | 21 | 22 | 23 | 24 | 25 | 26 | 27 | 28 | 29 | 30 | 31 | 32 | 33 | 34 | 35 | 36 | 37 | 38 |
|---|---|---|---|---|---|---|---|---|---|---|---|---|---|---|---|---|---|---|---|---|---|---|---|---|---|---|---|---|---|---|---|---|---|---|---|---|---|---|
| Ground | H | A | H | A | H | A | H | A | H | A | H | A | H | H | A | H | A | H | A | A | H | A | H | A | H | A | H | A | H | A | H | A | H | A | A | H | A | H |
| Result | D | D | L | W | D | W | W | W | D | W | W | D | L | W | W | D | L | W | L | W | W | L | W | L | W | W | L | L | W | L | W | L | D | L | L | D | W | W |
| Position | 4 | 9 | 11 | 9 | 10 | 7 | 4 | 2 | 3 | 3 | 2 | 2 | 4 | 4 | 4 | 4 | 4 | 4 | 5 | 4 | 4 | 4 | 3 | 4 | 4 | 3 | 3 | 3 | 3 | 3 | 3 | 3 | 3 | 3 | 6 | 5 | 4 | 4 |

Updated to match(es) played on 13 May 2012. Source: Competitive matches
A = Away; H = Home; W = Win; D = Draw; L = Loss

==== Matches ====
| 9 September 2011 2 | Milan | 2–2 | Lazio | Milan |
| 20:45 CEST | Ibrahimović 29'; Cassano 33' (yellow card) 90+6'; Van Bommel (yellow card) 38' | Report | Klose 12'; Cissé 21'; Dias (yellow card) 48'; Mauri (yellow card) 80' | Stadium: San Siro; Attendance: 48,543; Referee: Gianluca Rocchi |

| 18 September 2011 3 | Lazio | 1–2 | Genoa | Rome |
| 15:00 CEST | Sculli 11'; Dias (yellow card) 78' | Report | Palacio 54'; Kucka 72'; Frey (yellow card) 84'; Kaladze (yellow card) 89' | Stadium: Stadio Olimpico; Attendance: 32,164; Referee: Daniele Orsato |

| 21 September 2011 4 | Cesena | 1–2 | Lazio | Cesena |
| 20:45 CEST | Mutu 15'; Rossi (yellow card) 47'; Parolo (yellow card) 51'; Comotto (yellow card) 79' | Report | Hernanes (yellow card) 35', (goal) 48' (pen.); Klose 54' | Stadium: Stadio Dino Manuzzi; Attendance: 16,347; Referee: Domenico Celi |

| 25 September 2011 5 | Lazio | 0–0 | Palermo | Rome |
| 15:00 CEST | Cana (yellow card) 18'; Matuzalém (yellow card) 75' | Report | Migliaccio (yellow card) 38' | Stadium: Stadio Olimpico; Attendance: 29,934; Referee: Andrea Gervasoni |

| 2 October 2011 6 | Fiorentina | 1–2 | Lazio | Florence |
| 19:00 CEST | Cerci 8'; Lazzari (yellow card) 17'; Natali (yellow card) 47'; Behrami (yellow card) 87' | Report | Dias (yellow card) 26'; Hernanes 28'; Klose 83' | Stadium: Stadio Artemio Franchi; Attendance: 22,773; Referee: Mauro Bergonzi |

| 16 October 2011 7 | Lazio | 2–1 | Roma | Rome |
| 20:45 CEST | Hernanes 51' (pen.); Brocchi (yellow card) 62'; Cissé (yellow card) 73'; Klose 90+3' | Report | Osvaldo 5', (yellow card) 6'; Perrotta (yellow card) 7'; De Rossi (yellow card) 28'; Kjær (red card) 50'; Cassetti (yellow card) 78' | Stadium: Stadio Olimpico; Attendance: 51,265; Referee: Paolo Tagliavento |

| 23 October 2011 8 | Bologna | 0–2 | Lazio | Bologna |
| 20:45 CEST | Cherubin (yellow card) 22'; Ramírez (yellow card) 71'; Pulzetti (yellow card) 82'; Giménez (yellow card) 85' | Report | Acquafresca 23' (o.g.); Dias (yellow card) 34'; Biava (yellow card) 44'; Lulić 47', (yellow card) 87' | Stadium: Stadio Renato Dall'Ara; Attendance: 17,851; Referee: Antonio Damato |

| 26 October 2011 9 | Lazio | 1–1 | Catania | Rome |
| 20:45 CEST | Klose 17'; Lulić (yellow card) 20' | Report | Marchese (yellow card) 28'; Spolli (yellow card) 59'; Bergessio 63' (yellow card) 90+1'; Lanzafame (yellow card) 86'; Lodi (yellow card) 89' | Stadium: Stadio Olimpico; Attendance: 26,951; Referee: Gabriele Gava |

| 30 October 2011 10 | Cagliari | 0–3 | Lazio | Cagliari |
| 20:45 CET | | Report | Lulić 39'; Klose 44'; Rocchi 88' | Stadium: Stadio Sant'Elia; Attendance: 12,500; Referee: Paolo Mazzoleni |

| 6 November 2011 11 | Lazio | 1–0 | Parma | Rome |
| 15:00 CET | Radu (yellow card) 66'; Sculli 85' | Report | Morrone (yellow card) 90+2' | Stadium: Stadio Olimpico; Attendance: 29,564; Referee: Andrea De Marco |

| 20 November 2011 12 | Napoli | 0–0 | Lazio | Naples |
| 20:45 CET | | Report | Cissé (yellow card) 6'; Radu (yellow card) 81'; Stankevičius (yellow card) 90+2' | Stadium: Stadio San Paolo; Attendance: 46,524; Referee: Nicola Rizzoli |

| 26 November 2011 13 | Lazio | 0–1 | Juventus | Rome |
| 20:45 CET | Ledesma (yellow card) 67'; Sculli (yellow card) 79' | Report | Pepe 34'; Marchisio (yellow card) 56' | Stadium: Stadio Olimpico; Attendance: 57,148; Referee: Gianluca Rocchi |

| 5 December 2011 14 | Lazio | 3–0 | Novara | Rome |
| 20:45 CET | Biava 16', (yellow card) 27'; Rocchi 23', 72' | Report | Porcari (yellow card) 9'; Ludi (yellow card) 49' | Stadium: Stadio Olimpico; Attendance: 26,334; Referee: Gabriele Gava |

| 10 December 2011 15 | Lecce | 2–3 | Lazio | Lecce |
| 18:00 CET | Di Michele 12' (pen.); Olivera (yellow card) 17'; Ferrario 59'; Giacomazzi (yellow card) 75' | Report | Marchetti (yellow card) 12'; Klose 28', 87'; Cana 48', (yellow card) 49'; Hernanes (yellow card) 69' | Stadium: Stadio Via del Mare; Attendance: 6,846; Referee: Carmine Russo |

| 18 December 2011 16 | Lazio | 2–2 | Udinese | Rome |
| 20:45 CET | Diakité (yellow card) 42'; Lulić 43'; Ferronetti 51' (o.g.); Radu (yellow card) 65' | Report | Danilo (yellow card) 9'; Benatia (yellow card) 16'; Floro Flores 28'; Pinzi 74' | Stadium: Stadio Olimpico; Attendance: 31,884; Referee: Paolo Mazzoleni |

| 21 December 2011 1 | Lazio | 0–0 | Chievo | Rome |
| 20:45 CET | | Report | | Stadium: Stadio Olimpico; Attendance: 26,217; Referee: Christian Brighi |

| 7 January 2012 17 | Siena | 4–0 | Lazio | Siena |
| 18:00 CET | Destro 11', 81', (yellow card) 12'; Calaiò 35' (pen.), 45+4' (pen.); Rossettini (yellow card) 54'; Del Grosso (yellow card) 88' | Report | Bizzarri (red card) 45+2'; Sculli (yellow card) 74' | Stadium: Montepaschi Arena; Attendance: 10,270; Referee: Andrea Gervasoni |

| 15 January 2012 18 | Lazio | 2–0 | Atalanta | Rome |
| 12:30 CET | Hernanes 20' (pen.); Dias (yellow card) 28'; Diakité (yellow card) 64'; Klose 90+1' | Report | Carmona (yellow card) 7'; Lucchini (yellow card) 43' (yellow-red card) 53' | Stadium: Stadio Olimpico; Attendance: 27,438; Referee: Luca Banti |

| 22 January 2012 19 | Internazionale | 2–1 | Lazio | Milan |
| 20:45 CET | Milito 44'; Pazzini 63' | Report | Dias (yellow card) 2'; Rocchi 30' | Stadium: San Siro; Attendance: 57,893; Referee: Nicola Rizzoli |

| 29 January 2012 20 | Chievo | 0–3 | Lazio | Verona |
| 15:00 CET | | Report | Hernanes (yellow card) 7', (goal) 21'; Ledesma (yellow card) 13'; Dias (yellow card) 62'; González (yellow card) 80'; Klose 88', 89' | Stadium: Stadio Marc'Antonio Bentegodi; Attendance: 11,000; Referee: Daniele Orsato |

| 1 February 2012 21 | Lazio | 2–0 | Milan | Rome |
| 20:45 CET | Matuzalém (yellow card) 11'; Rocchi (yellow card) 70', (goal) 85'; Hernanes 77' | Report | Nesta (yellow card) 40' | Stadium: Stadio Olimpico; Attendance: 32,000; Referee: Antonio Damato |

| 5 February 2012 22 | Genoa | 3–2 | Lazio | Genoa |
| 12:30 CET | Constant (yellow card) 8'; Palacio 10'; Janković 25', 46'; Biondini (yellow card) 43'; Kucka (yellow card) 66'; Mesto (yellow card) 75' | | Stankevičius (yellow card) 33'; Ledesma 54' (pen.); Rozzi (yellow card) 64'; Diakité (red card) 82'; González 90' | Stadium: Stadio Luigi Ferraris; Attendance: 19,089; Referee: Paolo Tagliavento |

| 9 February 2012 23 | Lazio | 3–2 | Cesena | Rome |
| 20:45 CET | Konko (red card) 33'; Matuzalém (yellow card) 34'; Hernanes 53'; Lulić 60'; Kozák 63', (yellow card) 84' | Report | Mutu 14', (yellow card) 73'; Iaquinta 35' (pen.); Comotto (yellow card) 62'; Del Nero (yellow card) 71'; Rennella (yellow card) 90' | Stadium: Stadio Olimpico; Attendance: 23,129; Referee: Andrea Romeo |

| 19 February 2012 24 | Palermo | 5–1 | Lazio | Palermo |
| 20:45 CET | Barreto 10'; Donati 20'; Silvestre 42'; Budan 47'; Miccoli 52' | | Dias (yellow card) 41' (yellow-red card) 74'; Matuzalém (yellow card) 63'; Candreva (yellow card) 83'; Kozák 85' | Stadium: Stadio Renzo Barbera; Attendance: 18,364; Referee: Andrea De Marco |

| 26 February 2012 25 | Lazio | 1–0 | Fiorentina | Rome |
| 20:45 CET | Klose 36'; Biava (yellow card) 50' | Report | Cerci (yellow card) 52' | Stadium: Stadio Olimpico; Attendance: 26,091; Referee: Christian Brighi |

| 4 March 2012 26 | Roma | 1–2 | Lazio | Rome |
| 15:00 CET | Stekelenburg (red card) 9'; Borini 16', (yellow card) 89'; Heinze (yellow card) 61'; Totti (yellow card) 90' | | Hernanes 10' (pen.); Scaloni (yellow card) 15' (yellow-red card) 88'; Matuzalém (yellow card) 26'; Biava (yellow card) 37'; Mauri (yellow card) 45+1', (goal) 62'; Diakité (yellow card) 89' | Stadium: Stadio Olimpico; Attendance: 50,801; Referee: Mauro Bergonzi |

| 11 March 2012 27 | Lazio | 1–3 | Bologna | Rome |
| 20:45 CET | Diakité (yellow card) 36'; Matuzalém (red card) 43'; Rubin 56' (o.g.); González (red card) 58' | | Portanova 11'; Diamanti 28'; Khrin 60', (yellow card) 61' | Stadium: Stadio Olimpico; Attendance: 25,000; Referee: Marco Guida |

| 18 March 2012 28 | Catania | 1–0 | Lazio | Catania |
| 15:00 CET | Spolli (yellow card) 27'; Gómez (yellow card) 64'; Legrottaglie 80' | Report | Klose (yellow card) 75'; Dias (yellow card) 78'; Mauri (yellow card) 89' | Stadium: Stadio Angelo Massimino; Attendance: 17,406; Referee: Andrea Romeo |

| 24 March 2012 29 | Lazio | 1–0 | Cagliari | Rome |
| 15:00 CEST | Konko (yellow card) 81'; Diakité (yellow card) 84', (goal) 88' | Report | Pinilla (yellow card) 58'; Astori (yellow card) 78'; Nenê (yellow card) 80'; Ekdal (yellow card) 86' | Stadium: Stadio Olimpico; Attendance: 29,290; Referee: Sebastiano Peruzzo |

| 31 March 2012 30 | Parma | 3–1 | Lazio | Parma |
| 20:45 CEST | Mariga 6'; Floccari 12', 72'; Valdés (yellow card) 79'; Lucarelli (yellow card) 89' | Report | Konko (yellow card) 30'; Scaloni 37', (yellow card) 83' | Stadium: Stadio Ennio Tardini; Attendance: 13,115; Referee: Antonio Giannoccaro |

| 7 April 2012 31 | Lazio | 3–1 | Napoli | Rome |
| 21:00 CEST | Candreva 9'; Mauri 68'; Ledesma 81' (pen.); Biava (yellow card) 88'; Brocchi (yellow card) 90+3' | Report | Pandev 34'; Cannavaro (yellow card) 62'; Džemaili (yellow card) 78'; Britos (yellow card) 80' | Stadium: Stadio Olimpico; Attendance: 38,410; Referee: Paolo Mazzoleni |

| 11 April 2012 32 | Juventus | 2–1 | Lazio | Turin |
| 20:45 | Pepe 30'; Lichtsteiner (yellow card) 47'; Chiellini (yellow card) 49'; Quagliarella (yellow card) 56'; Del Piero 82' | Report | Diakité (yellow card) 12'; Biava (yellow card) 35'; Mauri 45', (yellow card) 54'; Kozák (yellow card) 80' (yellow-red card) 90+2'; Ledesma (yellow card) 81' | Stadium: Juventus Stadium; Attendance: 38,346; Referee: Antonio Damato |

| 22 April 2012 34 | Lazio | 1–1 | Lecce | Rome |
| 15:00 CEST | Biava (yellow card) 14'; Garrido (yellow card) 62'; Matuzalém 82' | Report | Cuadrado (yellow card) 43'; Bertolacci (yellow card) 53'; Bojinov 90+1' | Stadium: Stadio Olimpico; Attendance: 30,513; Referee: Gianluca Rocchi |

| 25 April 2012 33 | Novara | 2–1 | Lazio | Novara |
| 12:30 CEST | Paci (yellow card) 7'; Diakité 35' (o.g.); Morganella (yellow card) 48'; Mascara 79'; Caracciolo (yellow card) 83' | Report | Candreva 37', (yellow card) 81'; Garrido (yellow card) 57'; Kozák (yellow card) 59'; Matuzalém (yellow card) 85' | Stadium: Stadio Silvio Piola; Attendance: 9,946; Referee: Daniele Orsato |

| 29 April 2012 35 | Udinese | 2–0 | Lazio | Udine |
| 20:45 CEST | Abdi (yellow card) 24'; Fabbrini (yellow card) 39'; Pinzi (yellow card) 45+2'; Di Natale 69', (yellow card) 74'; Benatia (yellow card) 83'; Pereyra 90+4' | Report | Matuzalém (yellow card) 20'; Cana (yellow card) 51'; Dias (red card) 90+4'; Scaloni (yellow card) 90+10' | Stadium: Stadio Friuli; Attendance: 19,760; Referee: Mauro Bergonzi |

| 2 May 2012 36 | Lazio | 1–1 | Siena | Rome |
| 20:45 CEST | Biava (yellow card) 16'; Ledesma (yellow card) 41' (goal) 62' (pen.) | Report | Destro 27'; Bolzoni (yellow card) 61'; Rossi (yellow card) 90' | Stadium: Stadio Olimpico; Attendance: 26,194; Referee: Domenico Celi |

| 6 May 2012 37 | Atalanta | 0–2 | Lazio | Bergamo |
| 15:00 CEST | Minotti (yellow card) 75'; Stendardo (red card) 82'; Manfredini (yellow card) 86'; Carrozza (yellow card) 89' | Report | Kozák 35'; Candreva (yellow card) 70'; González (yellow card) 80'; Cana 90+1' | Stadium: Stadio Atleti Azzurri d'Italia; Attendance: 16,293; Referee: Gianluca Rocchi |

| 13 May 2012 38 | Lazio | 3–1 | Internazionale | Rome |
| 20:45 CEST | Lulić (yellow card) 16'; Diakité (yellow card) 52'; Kozák 59'; Candreva 63'; Konko (yellow card) 79'; Mauri 90+1' | Report | Milito 45' (pen.) | Stadium: Stadio Olimpico; Attendance: 45,051; Referee: Antonio Damato |

=== Coppa Italia ===
| 10 January 2012 Round of 16 | Lazio | 3–2 | Verona | Rome |
| 21:00 CET | Dias 44'; Rocchi 57'; Hernanes 90+1' | Report | Berrettoni 61' (yellow card) 90'; D'Alessandro 74', (yellow card) 90'; Ceccarelli (yellow card) 90'; Mareco (yellow card) 90+2' | Stadium: Stadio Olimpico; Attendance: 8,371; Referee: Gianluca Rocchi |

| 26 January 2012 Quarter-finals | Milan | 3–1 | Lazio | Milan |
| 20:45 CET | Robinho 15'; Seedorf 18'; Bonera (yellow card) 43'; Van Bommel (yellow card) 71'; Ibrahimović 84'; Nocerino (yellow card) 86' | Report | Cissé 5' | Stadium: San Siro; Attendance: 7,520; Referee: Andrea Gervasoni |

=== UEFA Europa League ===
==== Play-off round ====
Having qualified for the Europa League play-off round in the previous Serie A campaign, Lazio played a double-legged match for their chance to enter the Europa League. On 5 August 2011, Lazio drew Macedonian side FK Rabotnički, a team who has survived since the first qualifying round, earning them World's Club Team of the Month for July 2011.

| 18 August 2011 First leg | Lazio (Italy) | 6–0 | (North Macedonia) Rabotnički | Rome, Italy |
| 21:00 CEST | Hernanes 20'; Mauri 39'; Cissé 51', 65'; Rocchi 87'; Klose 90' | Report | Najdoski (yellow card) 10'; Petrovikj (yellow card) 18'; Velkovski (yellow card) 43' | Stadium: Stadio Olimpico; Attendance: 24,532; Referee: Sergei Karasev (Russia) |

| 25 August 2011 Second leg | Rabotnički (North Macedonia) | 1–3 (1–9 agg.) | (Italy) Lazio | Skopje, Macedonia |
| 20:45 CEST | Lazarevski 39'; Micevski (yellow card) 56' | Report | Diakité (yellow card) 22'; Rocchi 23', 77'; Kozák (yellow card) 65'; Hernanes 74' | Stadium: Philip II Arena; Attendance: 5,000; Referee: Menashe Masiah (Israel) |

==== Group stage ====
| Pos | Team | Pld | W | D | L | GF | GA | GD | Pts | Qualification |
|---|---|---|---|---|---|---|---|---|---|---|
| 1 | (Portugal) Sporting CP | 6 | 4 | 0 | 2 | 8 | 4 | +4 | 12 | Advance to knockout phase |
| 2 | (Italy) Lazio | 6 | 2 | 3 | 1 | 7 | 5 | +2 | 9 | Advance to knockout phase |
| 3 | (Romania) Vaslui | 6 | 1 | 3 | 2 | 5 | 8 | −3 | 6 | |
| 4 | (Switzerland) Zürich | 6 | 1 | 2 | 3 | 5 | 8 | −3 | 5 | |

Source: Soccerway

| 15 September 2011 1 | Lazio (Italy) | 2–2 | (Romania) Vaslui | Rome, Italy |
| 19:00 CEST | González (yellow card) 7'; Cissé 35' (pen.); Ledesma (yellow card) 61'; Zauri (red card) 63'; Matuzalém (yellow card) 65'; Sculli 71'; Kozák (yellow card) 79' | Report | Temwanjera (yellow card) 4'; Balaur (yellow card) 34'; Wesley 59', 63' (pen.); Bello (yellow card) 83' | Stadium: Stadio Olimpico; Attendance: 13,913; Referee: Eric Braamhaar (Netherlands) |

| 29 September 2011 2 | Sporting CP (Portugal) | 2–1 | (Italy) Lazio | Lisbon, Portugal |
| 21:05 CEST | Van Wolfswinkel 21'; Rinaudo (yellow card) 44'; Insúa 45+2', (yellow card) 45+3' (yellow-red card) 50'; Periera (yellow card) 51' | Report | Hernanes (yellow card) 21'; Dias (yellow card) 32'; Klose 40'; Cissé (yellow card) 56'; Rocchi (yellow card) 90+1'; Sculli (yellow card) 90+1' | Stadium: Estádio José Alvalade; Attendance: 33,725; Referee: Serge Gumienny (Belgium) |

| 20 October 2011 3 | Zürich (Switzerland) | 1–1 | (Italy) Lazio | Zürich, Switzerland |
| 21:05 CEST | Nikçi 23' | Report | Sculli 22'; Cana (yellow card) 38'; Matuzalém (yellow card) 88' | Stadium: Letzigrund; Attendance: 10,800; Referee: Pawel Gil (Poland) |

| 3 November 2011 4 | Lazio (Italy) | 1–0 | (Switzerland) Zürich | Rome, Italy |
| 19:00 CET | Sculli (yellow card) 39'; Diakité (yellow card) 41'; Brocchi 62'; Cana (yellow card) 86' | Report | Koch (yellow card) 45+1'; Chermiti (yellow card) 75' | Stadium: Stadio Olimpico; Attendance: 13,414; Referee: Michael Koukoulakis (Greece) |

| 1 December 2011 5 | Vaslui (Romania) | 0–0 | (Italy) Lazio | Piatra Neamţ^{3}, Romania |
| 21:05 CET | Temwanjera (yellow card) 19'; Papp (yellow card) 22'; Gladstone (yellow card) 32'; Jovanović (yellow card) 85' | Report | Hernanes (yellow card) 27'; Radu (yellow card) 65' | Stadium: Stadionul Ceahlăul; Attendance: 7,000; Referee: Milorad Mažić (Serbia) |

| 14 December 2011 6 | Lazio (Italy) | 2–0 | (Portugal) Sporting CP | Rome, Italy |
| 19:00 CET | Lulić (yellow card) 34'; Kozák 42'; Sculli 55' | Report | | Stadium: Stadio Olimpico; Attendance: 8,295; Referee: Mike Dean (England) |

Notes

- Note 3: Vaslui played their home matches at Stadionul Ceahlăul, Piatra Neamţ as their own Stadionul Municipal did not meet UEFA criteria.

==== Knockout phase ====
===== Round of 32 =====
| 16 February 2012 First leg | Lazio (Italy) | 1–3 | (Spain) Atlético Madrid | Rome, Italy |
| 19:00 CET | Klose 19'; Candreva (yellow card) 64' | Report | Adrián 25'; Suárez (yellow card) 26'; Falcao 37', 63'; Juanfran (yellow card) 51' | Stadium: Stadio Olimpico; Attendance: 30,604; Referee: Pavel Královec (Czech Republic) |

| 23 February 2012 Second leg | Atlético Madrid (Spain) | 1–0 (4–1 agg.) | (Italy) Lazio | Madrid, Spain |
| 21:05 CET | Godín (yellow card) 42', (goal) 48'; Assunção (yellow card) 86' | Report | Diakité (yellow card) 63'; Matuzalém (yellow card) 66' | Stadium: Vicente Calderón Stadium; Attendance: 30,000; Referee: Martin Atkinson (England) |

== Squad statistics ==
| No. | Pos. | Name | League | | Coppa Italia | | Europe | | Total | | Discipline | |
| No. | Pos. | Name | Apps | Goals | Apps | Goals | Apps | Goals | Apps | Goals | Yellow card | Red card |
|---|---|---|---|---|---|---|---|---|---|---|---|---|
| 1 | GK | (Argentina) Albano Bizzarri | 4 | -6 | 1 | -2 | 3 | -2 | 8 | -10 | 0 | 1 |
| 3 | DF | (Brazil) André Dias | 16 | 0 | 2 | 1 | 7 | 0 | 24 | 1 | 9 | 1 |
| 5 | DF | (Argentina) Lionel Scaloni | 7(6) | 0 | 0 | 0 | 2 | 0 | 9(6) | 0 | 0 | 0 |
| 6 | MF | (Italy) Stefano Mauri | 3(2) | 0 | 0 | 0 | 3 | 1 | 6(2) | 1 | 1 | 0 |
| 7 | FW | (Italy) Giuseppe Sculli | 11(6) | 2 | 1 | 0 | 6(2) | 3 | 18(8) | 5 | 3 | 0 |
| 8 | MF | (Brazil) Hernanes | 22(2) | 7 | 2 | 1 | 9(2) | 2 | 33(4) | 10 | 5 | 0 |
| 9 | FW | (Italy) Tommaso Rocchi (c) | 11(2) | 5 | 2 | 1 | 7(4) | 3 | 20(6) | 9 | 2 | 0 |
| 11 | MF | (Brazil) Matuzalém | 15(8) | 0 | 2(1) | 0 | 5(1) | 0 | 22(10) | 0 | 7 | 0 |
| 14 | DF | (Spain) Javier Garrido | 1 | 0 | 0 | 0 | 0 | 0 | 1 | 0 | 0 | 0 |
| 15 | MF | (Uruguay) Álvaro González | 19(6) | 1 | 2 | 0 | 7(2) | 0 | 28(8) | 1 | 2 | 0 |
| 16 | GK | (Italy) Alessandro Berardi | 0 | 0 | 0 | 0 | 0 | 0 | 0 | 0 | 0 | 0 |
| 18 | FW | (Czech Republic) Libor Kozák | 6(6) | 2 | 0 | 0 | 7(4) | 1 | 13(10) | 3 | 3 | 0 |
| 19 | MF | (Bosnia and Herzegovina) Senad Lulić | 24(4) | 4 | 2 | 0 | 9(1) | 0 | 35(5) | 4 | 2 | 0 |
| 20 | DF | (Italy) Giuseppe Biava | 15(1) | 1 | 0 | 0 | 5(1) | 0 | 20(2) | 1 | 2 | 0 |
| 21 | DF | (France) Modibo Diakité | 13(4) | 0 | 2 | 0 | 9 | 0 | 24(4) | 0 | 6 | 1 |
| 22 | GK | (Italy) Federico Marchetti | 21 | -21 | 1 | -3 | 7 | -8 | 29 | -37 | 1 | 0 |
| 24 | MF | (Argentina) Cristian Ledesma | 24(1) | 1 | 2(1) | 0 | 8(2) | 0 | 34(4) | 1 | 3 | 0 |
| 25 | FW | (Germany) Miroslav Klose | 24 | 13 | 2(2) | 0 | 6(1) | 3 | 33(3) | 16 | 0 | 0 |
| 26 | DF | (Romania) Ștefan Radu | 16 | 0 | 0 | 0 | 5(1) | 0 | 21(1) | 0 | 4 | 0 |
| 27 | MF | (Albania) Lorik Cana | 8(5) | 1 | 0 | 0 | 6 | 0 | 14(5) | 1 | 4 | 0 |
| 28 | FW | (Nigeria) Stephen Makinwa | 0 | 0 | 0 | 0 | 0 | 0 | 0 | 0 | 0 | 0 |
| 29 | DF | (France) Abdoulay Konko | 19(1) | 0 | 1 | 0 | 5(2) | 0 | 25(3) | 0 | 0 | 1 |
| 30 | FW | (Uruguay) Emiliano Alfaro | 1 | 0 | 0 | 0 | 0 | 0 | 1 | 0 | 0 | 0 |
| 32 | MF | (Italy) Cristian Brocchi | 11(1) | 0 | 0 | 0 | 3(1) | 1 | 14(2) | 1 | 1 | 0 |
| 33 | DF | (Lithuania) Marius Stankevičius | 11(2) | 0 | 1 | 0 | 1(1) | 0 | 13(3) | 0 | 2 | 0 |
| 39 | DF | (Belgium) Luis Pedro Cavanda | 1 | 0 | 1 | 0 | 1 | 0 | 3 | 0 | 0 | 0 |
| 41 | MF | (Italy) Enrico Zampa | 0 | 0 | 0 | 0 | 3(3) | 0 | 3(3) | 0 | 0 | 0 |
| 51 | DF | (Italy) Ivan Artipoli | 0 | 0 | 0 | 0 | 0 | 0 | 0 | 0 | 0 | 0 |
| 53 | FW | (Italy) Antonio Rozzi | 2(2) | 0 | 0 | 0 | 0 | 0 | 2(2) | 0 | 1 | 0 |
| 78 | DF | (Italy) Luciano Zauri | 5 | 0 | 0 | 0 | 5 | 0 | 10 | 0 | 0 | 1 |
| 81 | MF | (Italy) Simone Del Nero | 2(2) | 0 | 2(1) | 0 | 0 | 0 | 4(3) | 0 | 0 | 0 |
| 84 | GK | (Argentina) Juan Pablo Carrizo | 2(2) | -2 | 0 | 0 | 0 | 0 | 2(2) | -2 | 0 | 0 |
| 87 | MF | (Italy) Antonio Candreva | 4(2) | 0 | 0 | 0 | 2 | 0 | 6(2) | 0 | 2 | 0 |
| 89 | DF | (Italy) Federico Chirico | 0 | 0 | 0 | 0 | 0 | 0 | 0 | 0 | 0 | 0 |
| 92 | FW | (Italy) Tommaso Ceccarelli | 0 | 0 | 0 | 0 | 0 | 0 | 0 | 0 | 0 | 0 |
| 99 | FW | (France) Djibril Cissé | 18(5) | 1 | 2 | 1 | 7(2) | 3 | 27(7) | 5 | 1 | 0 |

Statistics accurate as of match played 23 February 2012
