= 2004–05 Deportivo de La Coruña season =

Deportivo de La Coruña
2004–05 season
- Manager: Javier Irureta
- Stadium: Riazor
- La Liga: 8th
- Champions League: Group stage
- Copa del Rey: Round of 32
Home colours	Away colours	Third colours

During the 2004–05 Spanish football season, Deportivo de La Coruña competed in La Liga.

== Season summary ==
Deportivo suffered a slump and finished eighth. The club also suffered poor form in the Champions League, finishing bottom of their group with only two points and no goals scored. This was a stark contrast to the form the club had shown in Europe the previous season when they reached the Champions League semi-finals.

== Kit ==
Deportivo's kit was manufactured by Joma and sponsored by Fadesa.

== Squad ==
Squad at end of season

Note: Flags indicate national team as defined under FIFA eligibility rules; some limited exceptions apply. Players may hold more than one non-FIFA nationality.

No.	Pos.	Nation	Player
1	GK	ESP	José Molina
2	DF	ESP	Manuel Pablo
3	DF	ESP	Enrique Romero
4	MF	ARG	Aldo Duscher
5	DF	ESP	César
6	MF	BRA	Mauro Silva
8	MF	ESP	Sergio
9	FW	ESP	Diego Tristán
10	MF	ESP	Fran
11	FW	ESP	Pedro Munitis
12	MF	ARG	Lionel Scaloni
13	GK	URU	Gustavo Munúa
14	DF	POR	Jorge Andrade
15	DF	ESP	Joan Capdevila

No.	Pos.	Nation	Player
16	MF	PAR	Roberto Acuña
18	FW	ESP	Víctor
19	FW	ESP	Albert Luque
20	DF	ESP	Pablo Amo
21	MF	ESP	Juan Carlos Valerón
23	DF	ARG	Fabricio Coloccini
24	DF	ESP	Héctor
25	GK	ESP	Dani Mallo
31	GK	ESP	David Yañez
33	MF	ESP	Carlos Pita
34	MF	ESP	Pablo Fernández
38	FW	ESP	Xisco
39	MF	ESP	Álex Bergantiños

=== Left club during season ===
Note: Flags indicate national team as defined under FIFA eligibility rules; some limited exceptions apply. Players may hold more than one non-FIFA nationality.

No. / Pos. / Nation / Player; 7 / FW / URU / Walter Pandiani (on loan to Birmingham City)	No. / Pos. / Nation / Player; 22 / FW / ESP / Changui (on loan to Pontevedra)

== Competitions ==
=== La Liga ===
==== League table ====
Pos	Team	Pld	W	D	L	GF	GA	GD	Pts	Qualification or relegation
6	Sevilla	38	17	9	12	44	41	+3	60	Qualification for the UEFA Cup first round
7	Valencia	38	14	16	8	54	39	+15	58	Qualification for the Intertoto Cup third round
8	Deportivo La Coruña	38	12	15	11	46	50	−4	51 (Note: DEP: 8 pts; ATH: 4 pts → ATH 1–0 MLG; MLG: 4 pts → MLG 1–0 ATH)	Qualification for the Intertoto Cup second round
9	Athletic Bilbao	38	14	9	15	59	54	+5	51	Qualification for the Intertoto Cup second round
10	Málaga	38	15	6	17	40	48	−8	51	

Source: LFP
Rules for classification: 1st points; 2nd head-to-head points; 3rd head-to-head goal difference; 4th head-to-head goals scored; 5th goal difference; 6th number of goals scored; 7th Fair-play points

=== UEFA Champions League ===
==== Third qualifying round ====
11 August 2004 First leg	Shelbourne (Republic of Ireland)	0–0	(Spain) Deportivo La Coruña	Dublin, Republic of Ireland
20:45		Report		Stadium: Lansdowne Road; Attendance: 23,320; Referee: Michal Beneš (Czech Republic)

24 August 2004 Second leg	Deportivo La Coruña (Spain)	3–0 (3–0 agg.)	(Republic of Ireland) Shelbourne	A Coruña, Spain
21:00	Víctor 59', 65'; Pandiani 88'	Report		Stadium: Estadio Riazor; Attendance: 20,225; Referee: Alain Hamer (Luxembourg)

==== Group stage ====
15 September 2004	Deportivo La Coruña (Spain)	0–0	(Greece) Olympiacos	Riazor, A Coruña
20:45		Report		Referee: Frank de Bleeckere (Belgium)

1 October 2004	Monaco (France)	2–0	(Spain) Deportivo La Coruña	Stade Louis II, Monaco
20:45	Kallon 5'; Saviola 10'	Report		Attendance: 13,673; Referee: Stefano Farina (Italy)

19 October 2004	Liverpool (England)	0–0	(Spain) Deportivo La Coruña	Anfield, Liverpool
20:45		Report		Attendance: 40,236; Referee: Anders Frisk (Sweden)

3 November 2004	Deportivo La Coruña (Spain)	0–1	(England) Liverpool	Riazor, A Coruña
20:45		Report	Andrade 14' (o.g.)	Attendance: 32,000; Referee: Wolfgang Stark (Germany)

23 November 2004	Olympiacos (Greece)	1–0	(Spain) Deportivo La Coruña	Karaiskakis Stadium, Athens
20:45	Đorđević 68'	Report		Attendance: 33,000; Referee: Terje Hauge (Norway)

8 December 2004	Deportivo La Coruña (Spain)	0–5	(France) Monaco	Riazor, A Coruña
20:45		Report	Chevantón 21'; Givet 35'; Saviola 38'; Maicon 54'; Adebayor 75'	Attendance: 16,000; Referee: Yuri Baskakov (Russia)
