= Chirico =

Chirico may refer to:

== People ==
- Cosimo Chiricò (born 1991), Italian footballer
- Emanuel Chirico, businessman in the apparel industry
- Federico Chirico (born 1989), Italian footballer
- Giuseppe Chirico (late 19th-century), Italian boss of the Camorra
- Louisa Chirico (born 1996), American tennis player
- Luca Chirico (born 1992), Italian racing cyclist
- Marcelo Chirico (born 1992), Uruguayan equestrian and show jumping competitor

== Places ==
- San Chirico Nuovo, a town and comune in the province of Potenza, Italy
- San Chirico Raparo, a town and comune in the province of Potenza, Italy

== Characters ==
- Chirico Cuvie, protagonist of the animated series Armored Trooper Votoms

== See also ==
- Giorgio de Chirico (1888–1978), Italian artist
- Di Chirico
