= Emiliano Alfaro =

Uruguayan footballer (born 1988)

Personal information
- Full name: Emiliano Alfaro Toscano
- Date of birth: 28 April 1988 (age 38)
- Place of birth: Treinta y Tres, Uruguay
- Height: 1.73 m (5 ft 8 in)
- Position: Forward

Senior career*
Years	Team	Apps	(Gls)
2006–2012	Liverpool Montevideo	107	(41)
2010	→ San Lorenzo (loan)	18	(2)
2012–2015	Lazio	8	(0)
2012–2013	→ Al Wasl (loan)	24	(17)
2014–2015	→ Liverpool Montevideo (loan)	27	(21)
2016	Buriram United	0	(0)
2016–2017	NorthEast United	13	(5)
2017	Fujairah	12	(8)
2017–2019	FC Pune City	25	(10)
2018	→ ATK (loan)	0	(0)
2019–2021	Liverpool Montevideo	10	(0)

International career
2005	Uruguay U17	9	(1)
2007	Uruguay U20	2	(0)
2011	Uruguay	1	(0)

Managerial career
- 2024: Liverpool Montevideo
- * Club domestic league appearances and goals

Emiliano Alfaro Toscano (born 28 April 1988) is a Uruguayan football manager and former player who played as a striker.

Apart from his native country, Alfaro also played club football in India, UAE, Argentina, Italy, and Thailand. He is nicknamed as El Picaro, meaning The Thief in Spanish language.

== Club career ==
=== Liverpool Montevideo and loan to San Lorenzo ===
Alfaro started his professional career with Montevideo club Liverpool at the age of 18, becoming a first-team regular at a young age. After slowly developing as a footballer, Alfaro became a regular scorer for Liverpool. His best period at the club was the 2009–10 Apertura tournament, when he scored 13 times in 15 league matches.

His excellent performances led him to be transferred on loan to the well-known Argentine club San Lorenzo de Almagro. His time in Argentina was not particularly successful, as he only managed to score twice for San Lorenzo.

Alfaro returned to Liverpool, where he again became a regular goalscorer. His performances were strong enough to draw the attention of Óscar Tabárez, coach of the Uruguay national team, for whom Alfaro made his debut.

=== Lazio ===
His form also saw him attract interest from Europe, and on January 12, 2012, Alfaro moved to Italian Serie A club Lazio for a fee of 3 million euro. He chose the number 30 shirt, never before worn at Lazio. He made his debut on 19 February in the 5–1 away defeat, against Palermo. He ended the season by making 8 appearances in total without scoring any goal.

=== Al Wasl ===
On September 12, 2012, Alfaro was loaned to Al Wasl in the United Arab Emirates, with option to purchase value set at 3.5 million. He made his debut on September 18, in the UAE President's Cup, scoring two goals against Al-Ittihad Kalba SC. On September 23, 2012, he made his debut in the league, to mark the victory, 4–1, against Al-Wahda where he also scored a hat-trick. After 33 appearances and 24 goals in total, he returned to Lazio.

=== Back to Liverpool ===
After spending the entire season of 2013–2014 in bench, on August 28, 2014, was loaned to his old club Liverpool Montevideo, the team that launched him in professional football. On 13 September, he played first game of season against the Torque in which he also scored a goal, with the game ending 3–0 to Liverpool. In the next game against Central Español on 27 September, he scored a brace that allowed his team to win the game 3–1. On May 2, 2015, with a 2–1 victory against Cerro Largo, Liverpool earned the promotion to the Uruguayan Primera División. On the May 23, with the closing of the season, he became the top scorer of the championship with a total of 21 goals scored in 27 games played.

=== Thailand ===
At the end of the loan period Alfaro went back to Lazio, but at the end of the summer transfer market summer he was sold to Thailand champions Buriram United. Due to injuries sustained in pre-season he never played for Buriram United, and finally his contract was mutually terminated.

=== India ===
On 1 September 2016, Alfaro signed with Indian Super League franchise NorthEast United FC. On 5 October, he scored both the goals in a match against FC Goa, in which NorthEast United emerged victorious with 2–0 scoreline. He scored the first goal in the 20 minute, taking advantage of a failure of Goa goalkeeper Laxmikant Kattimani to clear a backpass by Lúcio. He scored the second goal in the 63rd minute from a Holicharan Narzary assist. Although he netted five times in his first seven matches, his form dipped since then as he failed to score any more goals in the remaining six matches.

After a stint with Emirati second-tier club Al-Fujairah where he scored eight goals in 12 matches, Alfaro returned to the Indian Super League on 10 July 2017, and signed with FC Pune City; becoming the club's first foreign signing of the season. On 23 November, he made his debut in a 2–3 loss against Delhi Dynamos FC, scoring a goal in the 67th minute. Seven days later, he scored a brace against Mumbai City FC, which included the winning goal in the dying minute of the 2–1 victory.

On 18 November 2018, Alfaro joined ATK on a loan deal as a replacement for the injured Kalu Uche. On 20 November, he suffered an injury while training for his new club ATK. Eli Babalj was signed as a replacement of him.

=== Return to Liverpool and retirement ===
After joining his boyhood club Liverpool in July 2019, injuries regularly kept Alfaro out of action. He played 12 matches during the final stint for the club and scored a goal in 5–0 Copa Sudamericana win against Llaneros. On 21 March 2021, he announced retirement from professional football.

== Managerial career ==
After retiring, Alfaro worked as a youth coordinator at his last club Liverpool, before being named first team manager on 21 December 2023, replacing Jorge Bava. He left the club by mutual consent on 6 October 2024.

== Career statistics ==
Details correct to 24 November 2018

Season	Club	League			Cup			Continental			Other cups			Total	
Season	Club	Comp	Apps	Goals	Comp	Apps	Goals	Comp	Apps	Goals	Comp	Apps	Goals	Apps	Goals
2005–06	Liverpool (Montevideo)	PD	6	0	–	–	–	–	–	–	–	–	–	6	0
2006–07	Liverpool (Montevideo)	PD	12	1	–	–	–	–	–	–	–	–	–	12	1
2007–08	Liverpool (Montevideo)	PD	28	4	–	–	–	–	–	–	–	–	–	28	4
2008–09	Liverpool (Montevideo)	PD	21	10	–	–	–	–	–	–	–	–	–	21	10
2009–10	Liverpool (Montevideo)	PD	15	13	–	–	–	CS	2	0	–	–	-	17	13
Jan.-Jun. 2010	San Lorenzo	PD	15	2	–	–	–	–	–	–	–	–	–	15	2
2010	San Lorenzo	PD	3	0	–	–	–	–	–	–	–	–	–	3	0
Total San Lorenzo		–	18	2		–	–	–	–	–	–	–	–	18	2
2010–11	Liverpool (Montevideo)	PD	13	5	–	–	–	–	–	–	–	–	–	13	5
2011–12	Liverpool (Montevideo)	PD	12	7	–	–	–	CL	2	1	–	–	–	14	8
2014–15	Liverpool (Montevideo)	SD	27	21	–	–	–	–	–	–	–	–	–	27	21
Total Liverpool		–	134	61	–	–	–	–	4	1	–	–	–	138	62
Jan.-Jun. 2012	Lazio	A	8	0	CI	0	0	UEL	0	0	–	–	–	8	0
2012–13	Al Wasl	UPL	24	17	EC	8	6	–	–	–		–	–	32	23
2013–14	Lazio	A	0	0	CI	0	0	UEL	0	0	–	–	–	0	0
Total Al Wasl		–	24	17	–	8	6	–	–	–	–	–	–	32	23
2016	NorthEast United	ISL	13	5	–	–	–	–	–	–	–	–	–	13	5
2017–18	FC Pune City	ISL	25	10	–	–	–	–	–	–	–	–	–	25	10
2018–19	ATK	ISL	0	0	–	–	–	–	–	–	–	–	–	0	0
Total		–	222	95	–	8	6	–	4	1	–	–	–	234	102

== International career ==
Alfaro first represented Uruguay at the 2005 South American Under-17 Football Championship held in Venezuela. The Uruguayans were runners-up to Brazil and qualified for the 2005 FIFA U-17 World Championship, which was hosted by Peru. Alfaro also played at the world championship, but Uruguay finished bottom of its group.

He then played with the Uruguayan under-20 team at the 2007 FIFA U-20 World Cup held in Canada alongside Edinson Cavani and Luis Suárez.

On November 7, 2011, he was named for a FIFA World Cup qualification match against Chile in Montevideo.

Alfaro made his senior international debut for Uruguay against Italy at the Stadio Olimpico in Rome on 15 November 2011.

National team	Club	Season	Apps	Goals
Uruguay	Liverpool	2011	1	0
Total			1	0

International appearances and goals
#	Date	Venue	Opponent	Result	Goal	Competition
2011
1.	November 15, 2011	Rome, Italy	Italy	0–1	0	Friendly

== Playing style ==
Alfaro is a striker who primarily operates in the attacking third. His playing style is characterized by physical tenacity and positional opportunism.

== Personal life ==
Alfaro is of Italian heritage and holds an Italian passport, which allowed him to join Lazio as an EU player. His ancestors are from the Piedmontese town of Rorà, about 60 km southwest of Turin.

== Honours ==
=== Club ===
Liverpool

- Uruguayan Segunda División (1): 2014–15

=== Individual ===
- Top Scorer Uruguayan Segunda División (1): 2014–15
