= Lionel Scaloni =

Argentine football manager (born 1978)

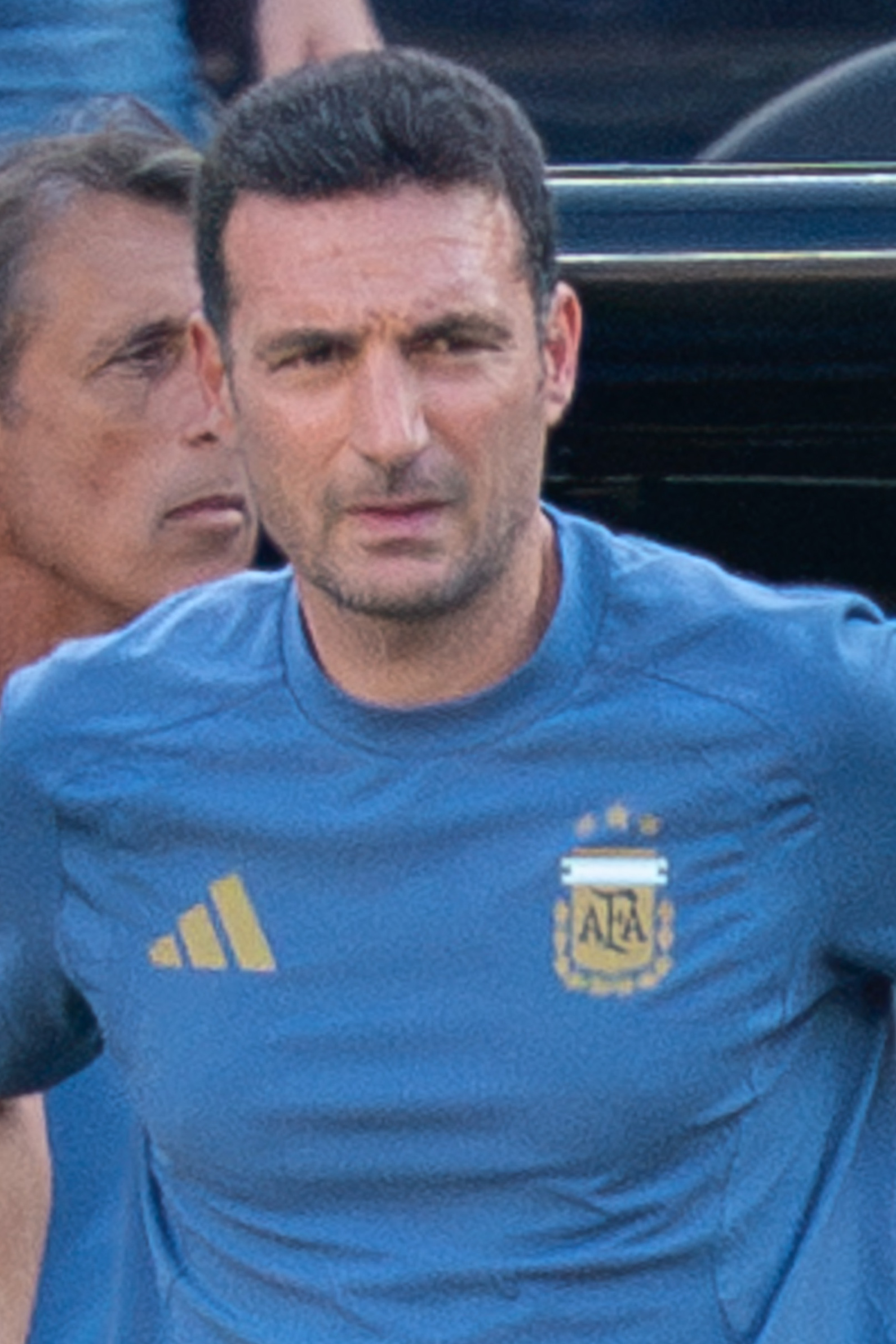
- Scaloni as manager of Argentina in 2026

Personal information
- Full name: Lionel Sebastián Scaloni
- Date of birth: 16 May 1978 (age 48)
- Place of birth: Pujato, Santa Fe, Argentina
- Height: 1.82 m (6 ft 0 in)
- Positions: Right-back; right midfielder

Team information
- Current team: Argentina (head coach)

Senior career*
Years	Team	Apps	(Gls)
1995–1996	Newell's Old Boys	12	(0)
1996–1997	Estudiantes	37	(7)
1998–2006	Deportivo La Coruña	200	(14)
2006	→ West Ham United (loan)	13	(0)
2006–2007	Racing Santander	30	(1)
2007–2013	Lazio	52	(1)
2008–2009	→ Mallorca (loan)	28	(0)
2013–2015	Atalanta	15	(0)
Total		387	(23)

International career
1997	Argentina U20	7	(2)
2003–2006	Argentina	7	(0)

Managerial career
- 2018: Argentina U20
- 2018–: Argentina
Medal record
Men's football
Representing Argentina (as player)
FIFA U-20 World Cup
Winner	1997 Malaysia
Representing Argentina (as manager)
FIFA World Cup
Winner	2022 Qatar
Runner-up	2026 Canada–Mexico–US
Copa América
Winner	2021 Brazil
Winner	2024 United States
Third place	2019 Brazil
CONMEBOL–UEFA Finalissima
Winner	2022 England
- * Club domestic league appearances and goals

Lionel Sebastián Scaloni (Rioplatense: [eskaˈloni], Italian: [skaˈloːni]; born 16 May 1978) is an Argentine professional football manager and former player who is the head coach of the Argentina national team. He is also an Italian citizen. Under his leadership, Argentina won the 2022 FIFA World Cup. Scaloni is regarded as one of the best national coaches in the world. A versatile player throughout his career as a footballer, he operated as a right-back or right midfielder.

Born in Pujato, Santa Fe Province, near Rosario, Scaloni debuted as a player for Newell's Old Boys in 1995. He spent most of his professional career in Spain, mainly at Deportivo de La Coruña, where he won the 1999–2000 Spanish league title and the 2001–02 Copa del Rey. In total, he amassed 258 games and 15 goals over 12 seasons in La Liga with three different teams. He also played for several years in Italy, with Lazio and Atalanta, before retiring in 2015. Internationally, he played for Argentina at under-20 level, and made his debut for the senior team in 2003; he won seven caps for the team between 2003 and 2006, and was part of their 2006 World Cup squad.

Scaloni began his coaching career in 2016, starting as an assistant at Sevilla and Argentina's under-20 team. In 2018, he was named the outright manager of the under-20 team, and was chosen to lead the Argentina senior team later that year. With the senior team, he guided them to third place at his first international tournament, the 2019 Copa América, in Brazil. He won the 2021 edition, Argentina's first such honour in 28 years, and then beat Italy in the 2022 Finalissima. Thereafter, the Scaloni-led national team won their third World Cup title, the first since 1986, in 2022 in Qatar. He also went on to win the 2024 Copa América as the Argentina manager, making him the first manager in football history to win three major international tournaments in a row. In 2026, he led Argentina to a second consecutive World Cup final, where they were defeated by Spain.

== Playing career ==
=== Club ===
==== Early years and Deportivo ====
Born in the small town of Pujato in the province of Santa Fe in Argentina, with Italian origins from Ascoli Piceno, Marche, Scaloni began his career in the Argentine Primera División with local club Newell's Old Boys and then Estudiantes, before joining Deportivo de La Coruña in Spain in December 1997 for 405 million pesetas.

Regularly used with the Galicians over an eight-and-a-half-year stint, he competed with Manuel Pablo and Víctor for both starting spots on the right flank. Due to a knee injury, he appeared in only 14 La Liga matches as Deportivo won the title for the first time.

After falling out with manager Joaquín Caparrós, Scaloni joined Premier League side West Ham United on loan on 31 January 2006, the final day of the transfer window, in an attempt to increase his chance of selection for the upcoming World Cup. He took the number 2 shirt from the departed Tomáš Řepka, and made his league debut for the East Londoners against Sunderland on 4 February; he also helped the team to reach the FA Cup final, a penalty shootout loss to Liverpool.

==== Racing Santander ====
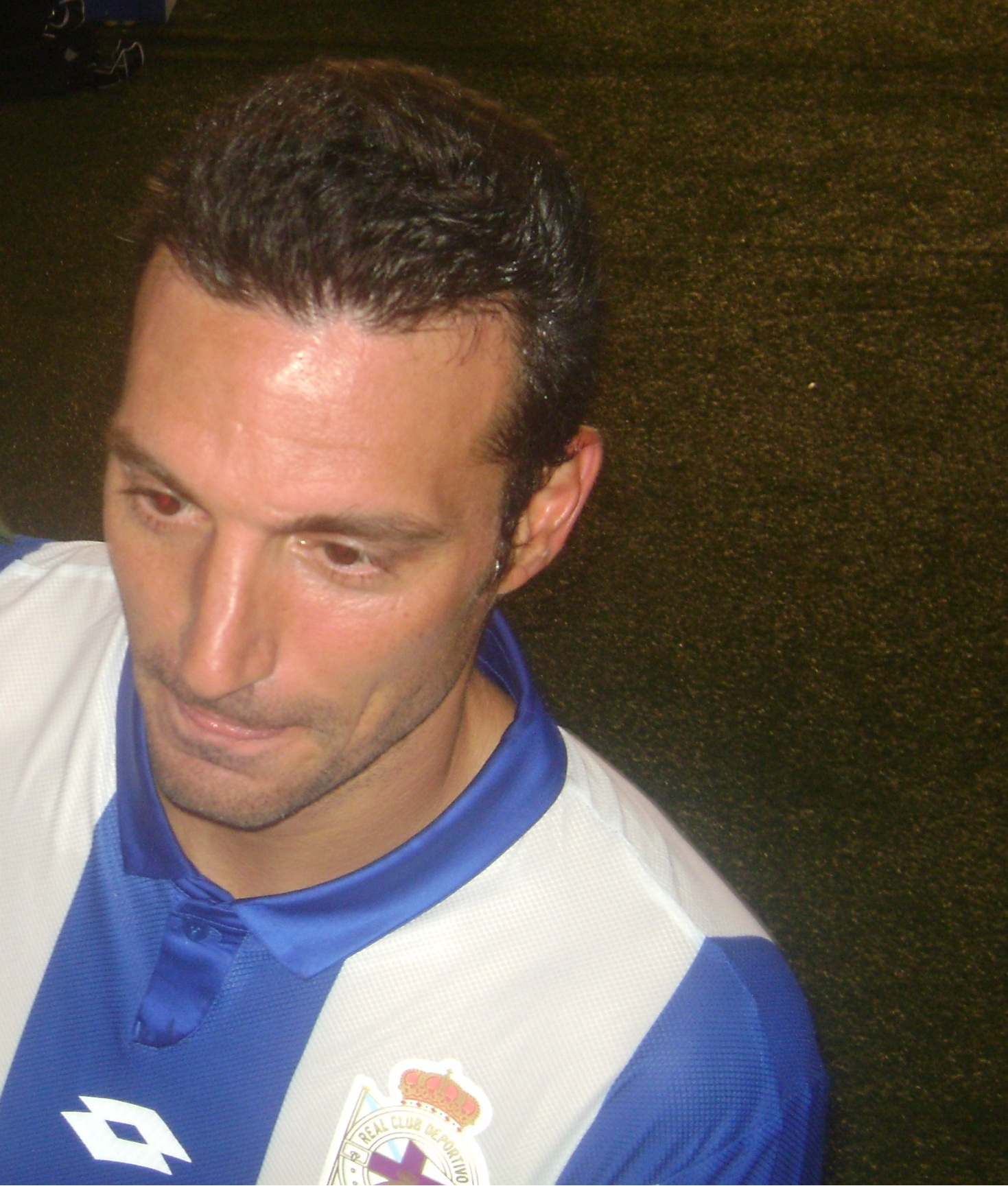
Scaloni as a Deportivo player

Scaloni left West Ham after a permanent move could not be agreed. Deportivo released him on 1 September 2006 alongside Diego Tristán, one day after the close of the summer transfer window.

However, due to the fact there were no limitations for free agents, two weeks later Scaloni signed a one-year contract at Racing de Santander, The Cantabrians subsequently finished in mid table. He appeared – and started – in both games against his former club, both ending in 0–0 draws.

==== Italy ====
On 30 June 2007, Scaloni moved to Lazio in Italy's Serie A on a five-year deal. In January of the following year, he returned to Spain, on loan to Mallorca for 18 months; subsequently, he returned to Rome, where he was rarely used for the following three seasons.

At age 35, Scaloni joined Atalanta in January 2013. He was released at the end of the campaign, but re-signed after failing to find a new club.

=== International ===
After making his debut for Argentina on 30 April 2003 in a friendly game with Libya, Scaloni was a surprise selection for the 2006 FIFA World Cup, taking the place of veteran Javier Zanetti who also played as a right wing-back. His only appearance of the tournament was the 2–1 extra time win against Mexico in the round of 16, on 24 June 2006 at the Zentralstadion, which he started and finished.

== Coaching career ==
=== Assistant ===
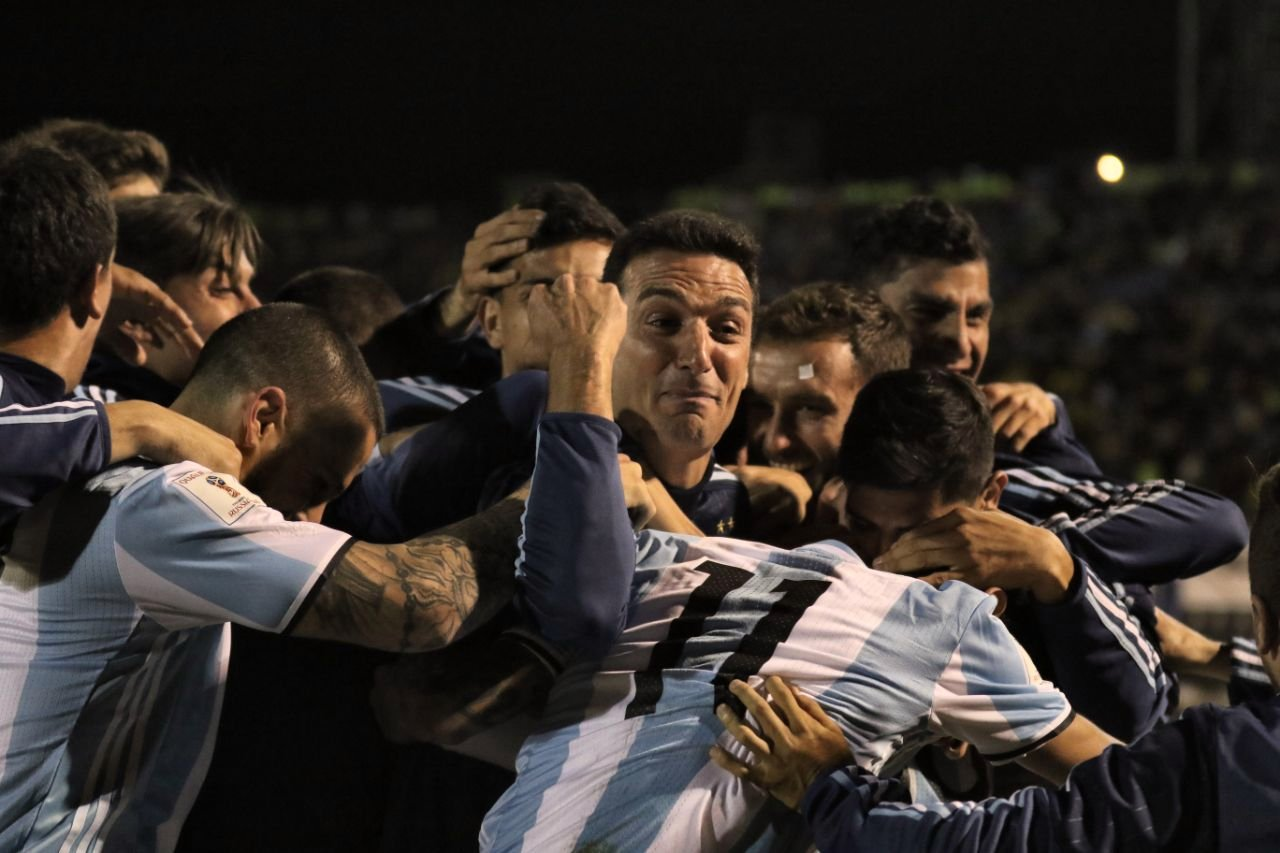
Scaloni, as an assistant coach, embracing the team after Argentina qualified for the 2018 FIFA World Cup.

On 11 October 2016, Scaloni joined compatriot Jorge Sampaoli's coaching staff at Sevilla. The following June, when Sampaoli was appointed as the new national team boss, Scaloni was again named as his assistant.

=== Argentina ===
After Argentina's failure at the 2018 FIFA World Cup in Russia, Sampaoli left his post as Argentina manager by mutual consent. Scaloni and Pablo Aimar were subsequently named caretaker managers until the end of the year. In November 2018, the former was confirmed in the post until the following June when the 2019 Copa América was due to take place. This decision unleashed a wave of criticism against Scaloni's appointment, including from legendary footballer Diego Maradona, who criticized the move for appointing an "unqualified" and inexperienced person in charge who "wouldn't even be able to direct traffic". Scaloni's appointment, at the time, was also seen as an offence against the national team due to the lack of consultation with other experienced managers at the time and the AFA was blamed for having no strategy regarding the appointment.

In the 2019 Copa América, he led the side to third place in Brazil, but not in the style fans expected as Argentina struggled to advance further in the tournament. The poor performance on Argentina's way to the third-place finish ultimately released a new wave of criticism against Scaloni appointment due to Argentina's inability to win the tournament despite expectation, and Scaloni's inadequate and inconsistent tactical performances. Despite calls to sack Scaloni, however, the AFA opted to extend Scaloni's contract until 2022, as AFA saw Scaloni's third-place finish acceptable.

Scaloni led Argentina to the 2021 Copa América title after defeating Brazil who were once again the hosts (1–0), helping them to win their first trophy in 28 years. In November that year, he was nominated for The Best FIFA Football Coach Award, but did not make the final three shortlist.

On 1 June 2022, Scaloni's Argentina won the 2022 Finalissima after defeating European champions Italy 3–0 at Wembley Stadium. On 16 November, Argentina beat the United Arab Emirates 5–0 in a friendly World Cup warm-up game ahead of the World Cup extending their unbeaten run to 36 matches, just one shy of Italy's record of 37.

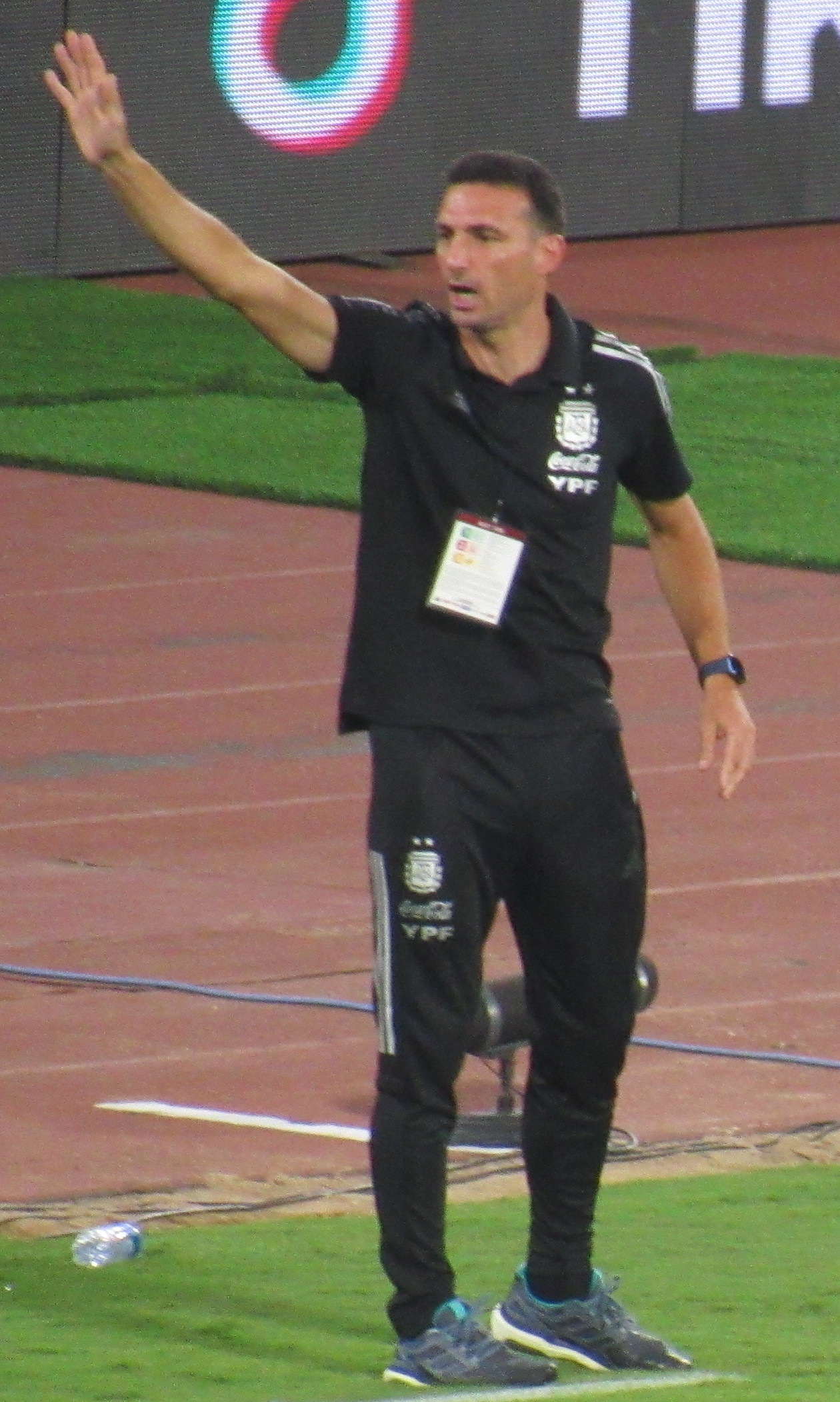
Scaloni managing Argentina in 2022

On 22 November, Scaloni's side lost 2–1 to Saudi Arabia in their opening group stage match of the World Cup in Qatar ending their unbeaten run of 36 matches; the result was considered by Gracenote statistically the greatest upset in the history of the tournament. Nevertheless, they made it into the knockout stages after recording 2–0 wins over both Mexico and Poland. Argentina then overcame Australia (2–1) in the round of 16, and advanced over the Netherlands in the quarter-finals with a penalty shoot-out victory, following which Scaloni defended his team after controversy surrounding the fights and tension between Argentine and Dutch players during the ill-tempered shoot-out. After beating Croatia 3–0 in the semi-finals, the nation reached the final for the second time in eight years. He then led Argentina to their third FIFA World Cup title in the final against France, with the Argentine team winning via a 4–2 penalty shoot-out after the match had ended in 3–3 after extra time.

Scaloni's success in guiding the national team of Argentina to victory was widely seen as a shock, due to the fact that Scaloni suffered from consistent opposition against his appointment when he was first offered the job in 2018. He became the youngest manager since 1978, and the fourth youngest manager to win the World Cup, which, coincidentally, were both achieved by Argentine compatriot César Luis Menotti. Due to this shocking conquest by a manager deemed as too inexperienced for the job, Scaloni was also referred for having "Midas' touch", named after the ancient Greek mythological character Midas. Scaloni was recognised as the best men's national coach in the world in 2022 by the International Federation of Football History & Statistics (IFFHS). He was also honoured with The Best FIFA Men's Coach for 2022. Shortly after the World Cup victory, Scaloni signed a new contract on 27 February 2023 to keep him as Argentina manager until the 2026 FIFA World Cup.

Almost a year later from the victory of the World Cup in Qatar, on 21 November, he led Argentina to a 1–0 win against Brazil at the Maracanã Stadium, in what would be the latter's first home defeat ever in World Cup qualification tournaments. He later guided his country to their record 16th title in Copa América in the 2024 tournament, defeating Colombia 1–0 after extra time in the final. Lautaro Martínez scored the winning goal in the 112th minute, having been assisted by Leandro Paredes and Giovani Lo Celso, all three of which were subbed on by Scaloni in the 97th minute; the coach was later praised for his substitutions.

On 28 May 2026, he announced the Argentina squad for the 2026 FIFA World Cup. He led Argentina to three wins in the group stage against Algeria, Austria and Jordan respectively, before leading them to back to back 3–2 wins against Cape Verde and Egypt. They then advanced to the semi-finals after defeating Switzerland 3–1 after extra time in the quarter-finals, before facing England in the semi-final, the first competitive fixture between the sides since 2002. After England took the lead, Argentina responded with two late goals to reach the final for the second consecutive time. Aiming to become the first manager since Vittorio Pozzo of Italy to win the World Cup twice in a row, Scaloni's side lost to Spain in the final after a 1–0 extra time defeat. Following the defeat, AFA President Claudio Tapia acknowledged the loss, urged Scaloni to remain in his position, and doubled down on his support, publicly stating that Scaloni remains his "Plans A, B, and C" for the future of the national team.

== Style of management ==
Scaloni is regarded as one of the best men's national coaches in the world due to his success with the Argentina national team.

Scaloni has stated that Carlo Ancelotti is the coach he most admires and that he tries to emulate his coaching style with Argentina.

In his time as coach of Argentina, the national press nicknamed the national team 'Scaloneta'.

Scaloni has instilled a coaching philosophy with Argentina centered on fostering unity and camaraderie among players through team bonding and ensuring clear, open communication to define each player's role and value within the team structure.

== Personal life ==
Scaloni has both Argentine and Italian citizenship. His older brother, Mauro, also played at Deportivo, but did not progress beyond its reserve team. Scaloni and his wife Elisa Montero met at age 31 and 30 when he was playing in Mallorca, where she lived. They have two sons.

In April 2019, Scaloni was run over while cycling in Calvià in Mallorca. Some media initially reported him to be in serious condition, but he was discharged a few hours later.

In 2024, a street was named after Scaloni in his hometown of Pujato.

== Career statistics ==
=== Club ===
Appearances and goals by club, season and competition
Club	Division	League			Cup (Note: Includes Copa del Rey, Supercopa de España, FA Cup, Coppa Italia)		Continental (Note: Includes Supercopa Libertadores, UEFA Cup, UEFA Champions League, UEFA Intertoto Cup)		Total	
Club	Division	Season	Apps	Goals	Apps	Goals	Apps	Goals	Apps	Goals
Newell's Old Boys	Argentine Primera División	1994–95	2	0	—		—		2	0
Newell's Old Boys	Argentine Primera División	1995–96	10	0	—		—		10	0
Newell's Old Boys	Total		12	0	0	0	0	0	12	0
Estudiantes de La Plata	Argentine Primera División	1996–97	21	3	—		—		21	3
Estudiantes de La Plata	Argentine Primera División	1997–98	16	4	—		4	1	20	5
Estudiantes de La Plata	Total		37	7	0	0	4	1	41	8
Deportivo de La Coruña	La Liga	1997–98	18	2	4	0	—		22	2
Deportivo de La Coruña	La Liga	1998–99	21	0	9	0	—		30	0
Deportivo de La Coruña	La Liga	1999–2000	14	0	1	0	5	0	20	0
Deportivo de La Coruña	La Liga	2000–01	25	3	2	1	12	1	39	5
Deportivo de La Coruña	La Liga	2001–02	25	2	6	0	11	0	42	2
Deportivo de La Coruña	La Liga	2002–03	32	3	6	0	11	0	49	3
Deportivo de La Coruña	La Liga	2003–04	23	2	4	0	11	1	38	3
Deportivo de La Coruña	La Liga	2004–05	27	2	2	0	7	0	36	2
Deportivo de La Coruña	La Liga	2005–06	15	0	3	1	7	0	25	1
Deportivo de La Coruña	Total		200	14	37	2	64	2	301	18
West Ham United (loan)	Premier League	2005–06	13	0	4	0	—		17	0
Racing de Santander	La Liga	2006–07	30	2	2	0	—		32	2
Lazio	Serie A	2007–08	12	0	—		7	0	19	0
Lazio	Serie A	2009–10	5	0	1	0	1	0	7	0
Lazio	Serie A	2010–11	12	0	2	0	—		14	0
Lazio	Serie A	2011–12	19	1	—		2	0	21	1
Lazio	Serie A	2012–13	4	0	—		3	0	7	0
Lazio	Total		52	1	3	0	13	0	68	1
Mallorca (loan)	La Liga	2007–08	6	0	—		—		6	0
Mallorca (loan)	La Liga	2008–09	22	0	6	0	—		28	0
Mallorca (loan)	Total		28	0	6	0	0	0	34	0
Atalanta	Serie A	2012–13	7	0	—		—		7	0
Atalanta	Serie A	2013–14	5	0	—		—		5	0
Atalanta	Serie A	2014–15	3	0	2	0	—		5	0
Atalanta	Total		15	0	2	0	0	0	17	0
Career total			387	24	54	2	81	3	522	29

=== International ===
Appearances and goals by national team and year
National team	Year	Apps	Goals
Argentina	2003	1	0
Argentina	2004	1	0
Argentina	2005	3	0
Argentina	2006	2	0
Total		7	0

== Managerial statistics ==
As of match played 17 November 2026

Managerial record by team and tenure
Team	Nat.	From	To	Record								Ref.
Team	Nat.	From	To	G	W	D	L	GF	GA	GD	Win %	Ref.
Argentina U20	(Argentina)	17 July 2018	30 November 2018	6	4	1	1	11	3	+8	66.67	
Argentina	(Argentina)	3 August 2018	Present	109	80	18	11	239	59	+180	73.39	
Career Total				115	84	19	12	250	62	+188	73.04	

== Honours ==
=== Player ===
Deportivo La Coruña

- La Liga: 1999–2000
- Copa del Rey: 2001–02
- Supercopa de España: 2000, 2002

West Ham United

- FA Cup runner-up: 2005–06

Argentina U20

- FIFA World Youth Championship: 1997

Argentina U21

- Toulon Tournament: 1998

=== Manager ===
Argentina U20

- 2018 COTIF Tournament

Argentina

- FIFA World Cup: 2022; runner-up: 2026
- Copa América: 2021, 2024
- CONMEBOL–UEFA Cup of Champions: 2022

Individual

- IFFHS Men's CONMEBOL Team Manager: 2021
- IFFHS Team of the Copa América Manager: 2021
- IFFHS Men's World's Best National Coach: 2022, 2023
- The Best FIFA Men's Coach: 2022
- South American Coach of the Year: 2022
- Panchina d'Oro: 2023
- Globe Soccer Career Coach Award: 2023

== See also ==
- National team managers with 100 or more matches
- List of Argentina national football team managers
