= Di Chirico =

Di Chirico is an Italian surname. Notable people with the surname include:

- Alessio Di Chirico (born 1989), Italian mixed martial artist
- Giacomo Di Chirico (1844–1883), Italian painter

== See also ==
- Chirico (disambiguation)
