= 2003–04 Villarreal CF season =

Villarreal
2003–04 season
- President: Fernando Roig
- Head coach: Benito Floro (until 24 February); Paquito García
- Stadium: El Madrigal
- La Liga: 8th
- Copa del Rey: Round of 16
- UEFA Cup: Semi-finals
- UEFA Intertoto Cup: Winners
- Top goalscorer: League: Sonny Anderson (12); All: Sonny Anderson (19)
colours	colours

The 2003–04 season was Villarreal Club de Fútbol's 81st season in existence and the club's 4th consecutive season in the top flight of Spanish football. In addition to the domestic league, Villarreal participated in this season's editions of the Copa del Rey and the UEFA Intertoto Cup. The season covered the period from 1 July 2003 to 30 June 2004.

== Competitions ==
=== Overall record ===
Competition	First match	Last match	Starting round	Final position	Record							
Competition	First match	Last match	Starting round	Final position	Pld	W	D	L	GF	GA	GD	Win %
La Liga	30 August 2003	23 May 2004	Matchday 1	8th	38	15	9	14	47	49	−2	39.47
Copa del Rey	8 October 2003	15 January 2004	Round of 64	Round of 16	4	3	0	1	6	4	+2	75.00
UEFA Cup	19 July 2003	26 August 2003	First round	Semi-final	12	5	4	3	16	9	+7	41.67
UEFA Intertoto Cup	19 July 2003	26 August 2003	Third round	Winners	6	3	3	0	8	3	+5	50.00
Total					60	26	16	18	77	65	+12	43.33

Source: Competitions

=== La Liga ===
==== League table ====
Pos	Team	Pld	W	D	L	GF	GA	GD	Pts	Qualification or relegation
6	Sevilla	38	15	10	13	56	45	+11	55 (Note: SEV 2–0 ATM; ATM 2–1 SEV)	Qualification for the UEFA Cup first round
7	Atlético Madrid	38	15	10	13	51	53	−2	55	Qualification for the Intertoto Cup third round
8	Villarreal	38	15	9	14	47	49	−2	54	Qualification for the Intertoto Cup second round
9	Real Betis	38	13	13	12	46	43	+3	52	
10	Málaga	38	15	6	17	50	55	−5	51 (Note: MLG 3–1 MLL; MLL 2–1 MLG)	

Source: LFP
Rules for classification: 1st points; 2nd head-to-head points; 3rd head-to-head goal difference; 4th head-to-head goals scored; 5th goal difference; 6th number of goals scored; 7th Fair-play points

==== Results summary ====
Overall								Home						Away					
Pld	W	D	L	GF	GA	GD	Pts	W	D	L	GF	GA	GD	W	D	L	GF	GA	GD
38	15	9	14	47	49	−2	54	10	5	4	28	19	+9	5	4	10	19	30	−11

Source: BDFutbol

==== Results by round ====
Round	1	2	3	4	5	6	7	8	9	10	11	12	13	14	15	16	17	18	19	20	21	22	23	24	25	26	27	28	29	30	31	32	33	34	35	36	37	38
Ground	A	H	A	H	A	H	A	H	A	H	A	H	A	H	A	H	A	A	H	H	A	H	A	H	A	H	A	H	A	H	A	H	A	H	A	H	H	A
Result	D	D	W	D	W	D	L	D	L	W	L	W	W	L	D	W	W	L	W	W	L	L	L	W	L	L	L	W	L	D	D	L	W	W	D	W	W	L
Position	13	15	6	8	5	5	9	11	12	9	12	10	9	10	9	7	5	6	5	5	6	7	8	6	8	9	10	8	9	9	10	10	10	8	9	7	6	8

Source: BDFutbol
A = Away; H = Home; W = Win; D = Draw; L = Loss

==== Matches ====
30 August 2003 1	Málaga	0–0	Villarreal	Málaga
CEST (UTC+2)				Stadium: La Rosaleda; Referee: César Muñiz Fernández

2 September 2003 2	Villarreal	1–1	Real Madrid	Villarreal
CEST (UTC+2)	Anderson 70'		Núñez 85'	Stadium: El Madrigal; Referee: Alfonso Pino Zamorano

14 September 2003 3	Espanyol	1–2	Villarreal	Barcelona
CEST (UTC+2)	Rodríguez 13'		Víctor 24'; Riquelme 90' (pen.)	Stadium: Olímpic Lluís Companys; Referee: Javier Turienzo Álvarez

21 September 2003 4	Villarreal	1–1	Celta Vigo	Villarreal
CEST (UTC+2)				Stadium: El Madrigal; Referee: Jesús Téllez Sánchez

28 September 2003 5	Racing Santander	0–2	Villarreal	Santander
CEST (UTC+2)			Anderson 68'; Riquelme 88'	Stadium: El Sardinero; Referee: Bernardino González Vázquez

4 October 2003 6	Villarreal	1–1	Zaragoza	Villarreal
CEST (UTC+2)	Víctor 5'		Villa 23'	Stadium: El Madrigal; Referee: Rafael Ramírez Domínguez

19 October 2003 7	Athletic Bilbao	2–0	Villarreal	Bilbao
CEST (UTC+2)				Stadium: San Mamés

26 October 2003 8	Villarreal	3–3	Sevilla	Villarreal
CEST (UTC+2)				Stadium: El Madrigal

29 October 2003 9	Albacete	2–0	Villarreal	Albacete
CET (UTC+1)				Stadium: Carlos Belmonte

2 November 2003 10	Villarreal	1–0	Osasuna	Villarreal
CET (UTC+1)				Stadium: El Madrigal

9 November 2003 11	Atlético Madrid	1–0	Villarreal	Madrid
CET (UTC+1)				Stadium: Vicente Calderón

22 November 2003 12	Villarreal	2–1	Barcelona	Villarreal
CET (UTC+1)				Stadium: El Madrigal

30 November 2003 13	Deportivo La Coruña	0–1	Villarreal	A Coruña
CET (UTC+1)				Stadium: Riazor

3 December 2003 14	Villarreal	0–2	Mallorca	Villarreal
CET (UTC+1)				Stadium: El Madrigal

7 December 2003 15	Murcia	1–1	Villarreal	Murcia
CET (UTC+1)				Stadium: Nueva Condomina

13 December 2003 16	Villarreal	2–0	Real Sociedad	Villarreal
CET (UTC+1)				Stadium: El Madrigal

21 December 2003 17	Real Betis	1–3	Villarreal	Seville
CET (UTC+1)				Stadium: Manuel Ruiz de Lopera

4 January 2004 18	Valencia	4–2	Villarreal	Valencia
CET (UTC+1)				Stadium: Mestalla

11 January 2004 19	Villarreal	3–1	Valladolid	Villarreal
CET (UTC+1)				Stadium: El Madrigal

18 January 2004 20	Villarreal	2–0	Málaga	Villarreal
CET (UTC+1)				Stadium: El Madrigal

24 January 2004 21	Real Madrid	2–1	Villarreal	Madrid
19:30 CET (UTC+1)				Stadium: Santiago Bernabéu; Attendance: 80,000; Referee: Arturo Daudén Ibáñez

1 February 2004 22	Villarreal	0–1	Espanyol	Villarreal
CET (UTC+1)				Stadium: El Madrigal; Attendance: 17,000

8 February 2004 23	Celta Vigo	2–1	Villarreal	Vigo
CET (UTC+1)				Stadium: Balaídos; Attendance: 18,000

15 February 2004 24	Villarreal	6–3	Racing Santander	Villarreal
CET (UTC+1)				Stadium: El Madrigal; Attendance: 18,000

22 February 2004 25	Zaragoza	4–1	Villarreal	Zaragoza
CET (UTC+1)				Stadium: La Romareda; Attendance: 29,000

29 February 2004 26	Villarreal	0–1	Athletic Bilbao	Villarreal
CET (UTC+1)				Stadium: El Madrigal; Attendance: 17,500

7 March 2004 27	Sevilla	2–0	Villarreal	Seville
CET (UTC+1)				Stadium: Ramón Sánchez Pizjuán; Attendance: 45,000

14 March 2004 28	Villarreal	2–1	Albacete	Villarreal
CET (UTC+1)				Stadium: El Madrigal; Attendance: 17,000

21 March 2004 29	Osasuna	2–1	Villarreal	Pamplona
CET (UTC+1)				Stadium: El Sadar; Attendance: 14,354

28 March 2004 30	Villarreal	0–0	Atlético Madrid	Villarreal
CEST (UTC+2)				Stadium: El Madrigal; Attendance: 9,000

3 April 2004 31	Barcelona	0–0	Villarreal	Barcelona
CEST (UTC+2)				Stadium: Camp Nou; Attendance: 50,000

11 April 2004 32	Villarreal	0–2	Deportivo La Coruña	Villarreal
CEST (UTC+2)				Stadium: El Madrigal

18 April 2004 33	Mallorca	1–2	Villarreal	Palma
CEST (UTC+2)				Stadium: Son Moix; Attendance: 20,000

25 April 2004 34	Villarreal	1–0	Murcia	Villarreal
CEST (UTC+2)				Stadium: El Madrigal; Attendance: 13,000

2 May 2004 35	Real Sociedad	2–2	Villarreal	San Sebastián
CEST (UTC+2)				Stadium: Anoeta; Attendance: 26,143

9 May 2004 36	Villarreal	1–0	Real Betis	Villarreal
CEST (UTC+2)				Stadium: El Madrigal; Attendance: 16,000

14 May 2004 37	Villarreal	2–1	Valencia	Villarreal
CEST (UTC+2)				Stadium: El Madrigal; Attendance: 19,000

23 May 2004 38	Valladolid	3–0	Villarreal	Valladolid
CEST (UTC+2)				Stadium: José Zorrilla; Attendance: 15,000

=== Copa del Rey ===
8 October 2003 Round of 64	Alicante	1–2	Villarreal	Alicante
CEST (UTC+2)				Stadium: Antonio Solana

16 December 2003 Round of 32	Algeciras	0–1	Villarreal	Algeciras
CET (UTC+1)				Stadium: Nuevo Mirador

8 January 2004 Round of 16; First leg	Villarreal	1–3	Sevilla	Villarreal
CET (UTC+1)				Stadium: El Madrigal

15 January 2004 Round of 16; Second leg	Sevilla	0–2 (3 (a)–3 agg.)	Villarreal	Seville
CET (UTC+1)				Stadium: Ramón Sánchez Pizjuán

=== UEFA Cup ===
==== First round ====
24 September 2003 First leg	Villarreal (Spain)	0–0	(Turkey) Trabzonspor	Villarreal, Spain
22:00		Report		Stadium: El Madrigal; Attendance: 17,000; Referee: Laurent Duhamel (France)

15 October 2003 Second leg	Trabzonspor (Turkey)	2–3 (2–3 agg.)	(Spain) Villarreal	Trabzon, Turkey
19:00	Gökdeniz 72'; Tekke 82'	Report	Anderson 60'; José Mari 66', 90'	Stadium: Hüseyin Avni Aker Stadium; Attendance: 15,000; Referee: Markus Nobs (Switzerland)

==== Second round ====
6 November 2003 First leg	Villarreal (Spain)	2–0	(Russia) Torpedo Moscow	Villarreal, Spain
20:00	Riquelme 51', 68'	Report		Stadium: El Madrigal; Referee: Emil Bozinovski (Macedonia)

27 November 2003 Second leg	Torpedo Moscow (Russia)	1–0 (1–2 agg.)	(Spain) Villarreal	Moscow, Russia
17:30	Semshov 73'	Report		Stadium: Luzhniki Stadium; Referee: Martin Ingvarsson (Sweden)

==== Third round ====
26 February 2004 First leg	Galatasaray (Turkey)	2–2	(Spain) Villarreal	Istanbul, Turkey
19:30	Erdoğan 26'; César Prates 51'	Report	Anderson 6'; Riquelme 21'	Stadium: Atatürk Olympic Stadium; Referee: Stefano Farina (Italy)

3 March 2004 Second leg	Villarreal (Spain)	3–0 (5–2 agg.)	(Turkey) Galatasaray	Villarreal, Spain
21:30	Anderson 48'; Roger García 52'; Riquelme 88'	Report		Stadium: El Madrigal; Referee: Jan Wegereef (Netherlands)

==== Fourth round ====
11 March 2004 First leg	Villarreal (Spain)	2–0	(Italy) Roma	Vilarreal, Spain
21:30	Anderson 29'; José Mari 35'	Report		Stadium: El Madrigal; Attendance: 20,000; Referee: Frank De Bleeckere (Belgium)

25 March 2004 Second leg	Roma (Italy)	2–1 (2–3 agg.)	(Spain) Villarreal	Rome, Italy
20:45	Emerson 10'; Cassano 50'	Report	Anderson 66'	Stadium: Stadio Olimpico; Attendance: 29,100; Referee: Gilles Veissière (France)

==== Quarter-finals ====
8 April 2004 First leg	Celtic (Scotland)	1–1	(Spain) Villarreal	Glasgow, Scotland
21:00	Larsson 64'	Report	Josico 9'	Stadium: Celtic Park; Attendance: 58,493; Referee: Kyros Vassaras (Greece)

14 April 2004 Second leg	Villarreal (Spain)	2–0 (3–1 agg.)	(Scotland) Celtic	Villarreal, Spain
20:00	Anderson 6'; Roger 68'	Report		Stadium: El Madrigal; Attendance: 15,964; Referee: Massimo De Santis (Italy)

==== Semi-finals ====
22 April 2004 First leg	Villarreal (Spain)	0–0	(Spain) Valencia	Villarreal, Spain
21:45		Report		Stadium: El Madrigal; Attendance: 23,000; Referee: Lucílio Batista (Portugal)

6 May 2004 Second leg	Valencia (Spain)	1–0 (1–0 agg.)	(Spain) Villarreal	Valencia, Spain
21:45	Mista 16' (pen.)	Report		Stadium: Mestalla; Attendance: 52,000; Referee: Terje Hauge (Norway)

=== UEFA Intertoto Cup ===
==== Third round ====
19 July 2003 First leg	Villarreal (Spain)	2–0	(Italy) Brescia	Villarreal, Spain
	Calleja 15'; Víctor 81'			Stadium: El Madrigal; Attendance: 7,000; Referee: Uriah Rennie (England)

26 July 2003 Second leg	Brescia (Italy)	1–1 (1–3 agg.)	(Spain) Villarreal	Brescia, Italy
	Petruzzi 88'		Guayre 52'	Stadium: Stadio Mario Rigamonti; Attendance: 9,000; Referee: Stefan Johannesson (Sweden)

==== Semi-finals ====
30 July 2003 First leg	Brno (Czech Republic)	1–1	(Spain) Villarreal	Brno, Czech Republic
20:00	Došek 53'	Report	José Mari 45'	Stadium: Městský fotbalový stadion Srbská; Attendance: 10,506; Referee: Edo Trivković (Croatia)

6 August 2003 Second leg	Villarreal (Spain)	2–0 (3–1 agg.)	(Czech Republic) Brno	Villarreal, Spain
21:45	J. López 22'; Anderson 90+'	Report		Stadium: El Madrigal; Attendance: 12,000; Referee: Michael Weiner (Germany)

==== Finals ====
12 August 2003 First leg	Heerenveen (Netherlands)	1–2	(Spain) Villarreal	Heerenveen, Netherlands
20:00	Ballesteros 25' (o.g.)	Report	Calleja 13'; Víctor 45'	Stadium: Abe Lenstra Stadion; Attendance: 20,000; Referee: Peter Fröjdfeldt (Sweden)

26 August 2003 Second leg	Villarreal (Spain)	0–0 (2–1 agg.)	(Netherlands) Heerenveen	Villarreal, Spain
21:45		Report		Stadium: El Madrigal; Attendance: 15,000; Referee: Stuart Dougal (Scotland)
