= Iago Iglesias =

Spanish footballer

Personal information
- Full name: Iago Iglesias Castro
- Date of birth: 23 February 1984 (age 42)
- Place of birth: A Coruña, Spain
- Height: 1.76 m (5 ft 9 1/2 in)
- Position: Attacking midfielder

Youth career
- Galicia Gaiteira
- 2000–2003: Calasanz

Senior career*
| Years | Team | Apps | (Gls) |
| 2003–2004 | Laracha | ? | (30) |
| 2005 | Atlético Arteixo | 0 | (0) |
| 2005–2006 | Deportivo B | 24 | (7) |
| 2005–2008 | Deportivo La Coruña | 20 | (4) |
| 2007–2008 | → Elche (loan) | 12 | (1) |
| 2008–2009 | Valencia B | 33 | (3) |
| 2009–2012 | Montañeros | 78 | (14) |
| 2012–2014 | Racing Ferrol | 60 | (9) |
| 2014–2015 | Laracha | 15 | (0) |
| Total | | 242+ | (68) |

International career
| 2006 | Spain U21 | 2 | (0) |
- * Club domestic league appearances and goals

Iago Iglesias Castro (born 23 February 1984) is a Spanish former professional footballer who played as an attacking midfielder.

== Club career ==
Iglesias was born in A Coruña, Galicia. Bought by Deportivo de La Coruña from amateurs Atlético Arteixo in 2005, he spent two seasons alternating between the first team and the reserves, without ever establishing himself in the former. He made his debut in La Liga on 20 October 2005, playing the second half of a 0–1 home loss against CA Osasuna. He scored the first of four goals in that competition the following 2 April, closing the 2–0 win over Racing de Santander also at Estadio Riazor.

For the 2007–08 campaign, Iglesias was loaned to Segunda División side Elche CF, being rarely used due to injury. In that summer, he was released by Depor and joined Valencia CF Mestalla.

After leaving Valencia's reserves, Iglesias kept fit training with his first club Laracha CF, joining another team in the Segunda División B shortly after, Montañeros CF also in his native region.

== International career ==
Iglesias was called up for a Spain under-21 side match against Denmark in May 2006, only a few months after making his professional debut with Deportivo. He earned the first of his two caps by coming on as a second-half substitute in the 2–0 loss in Brøndby, on the 17th.
