= Federico Chirico =

Italian footballer

Personal information
- Date of birth: 13 May 1989 (age 37)
- Place of birth: Rome, Italy
- Position: Defender

Youth career
- Lazio

Senior career*
Years	Team	Apps	(Gls)
2008–2012	Lazio	0	(0)
2008–2009	→ Aversa Normanna (loan)	5	(0)
2009–2010	→ Cavese (loan)	0	(0)
- * Club domestic league appearances and goals

Federico Chirico (born 13 May 1989) is a former Italian football defender.

== Caps on Italian Series ==
Serie C2 : 5 Caps
