= Dani Mallo =

Spanish footballer

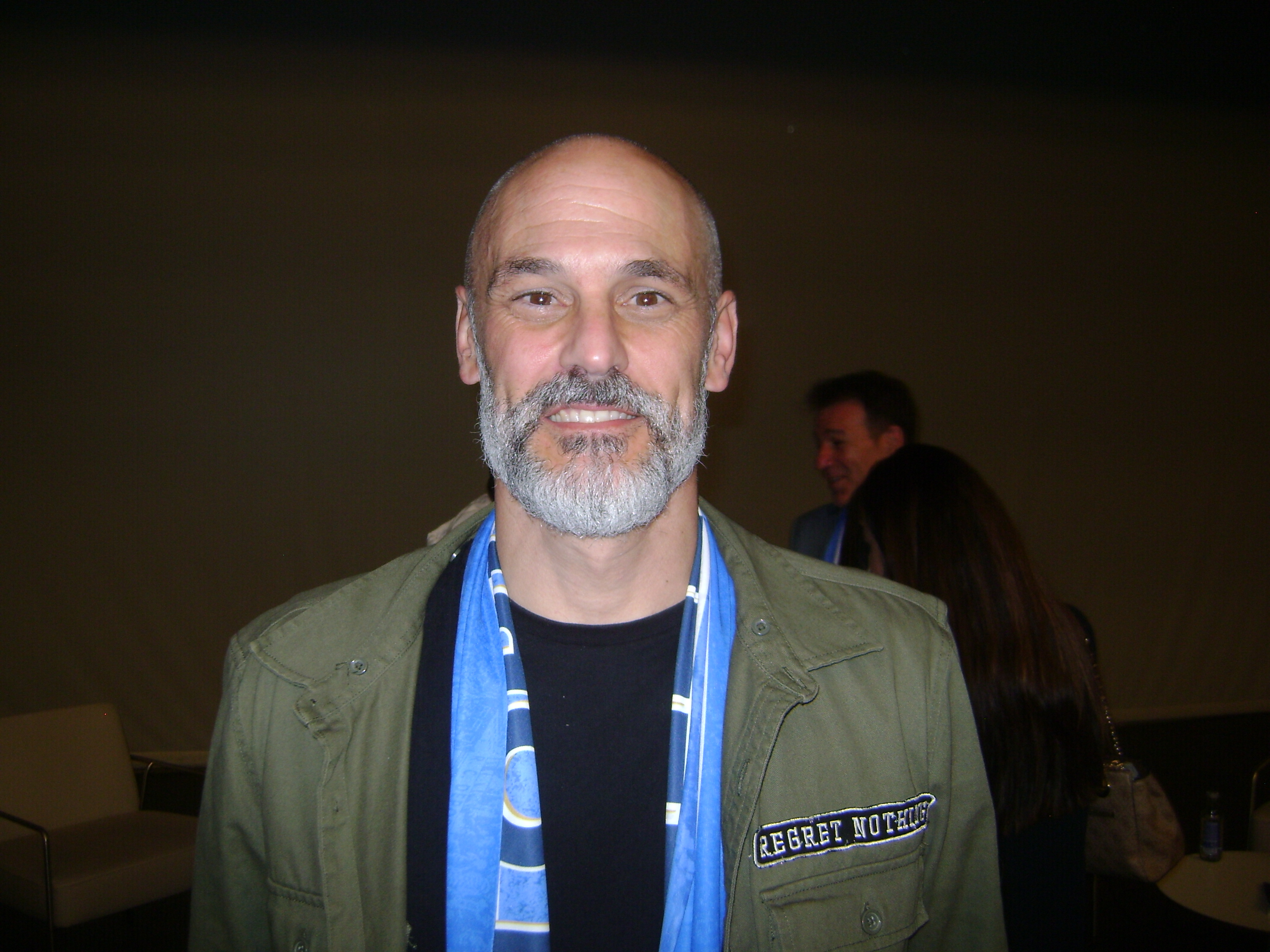
- Mallo in 2025

Personal information
- Full name: Daniel Mallo Castro
- Date of birth: 25 January 1979 (age 47)
- Place of birth: Cambre, Spain
- Height: 1.85 m (6 ft 1 in)
- Position: Goalkeeper

Youth career
- 1994–1995: Sporting Cambre
- 1995–1997: Deportivo La Coruña

Senior career*
| Years | Team | Apps | (Gls) |
| 1997–2001 | Deportivo B | 96 | (0) |
| 2001–2006 | Deportivo La Coruña | 3 | (0) |
| 2003–2004 | → Elche (loan) | 38 | (0) |
| 2006–2008 | Braga | 8 | (0) |
| 2009 | Falkirk | 15 | (0) |
| 2009–2013 | Girona | 81 | (0) |
| 2013–2015 | Lugo | 30 | (0) |
| 2015–2016 | Albacete | 3 | (0) |
| 2016 | Atlético Kolkata | 2 | (0) |
| 2017 | Hospitalet | 12 | (0) |
| Total | | 288 | (0) |

International career
| 1996–1998 | Spain U18 | 12 | (0) |
| 2000 | Spain U21 | 1 | (0) |
| 2005 | Galicia | | |
- * Club domestic league appearances and goals

Daniel 'Dani' Mallo Castro (born 25 January 1979) is a Spanish former professional footballer who played as a goalkeeper.

The better part of his senior career was spent at Deportivo, where he served almost exclusively as third choice in the first team, and Girona. Over eight seasons, he appeared in 152 matches in the Segunda División.

== Club career ==
Born in Cambre, Galicia, Mallo spent most of his career as third-string goalkeeper with local Deportivo de La Coruña, having a loan stint at Segunda División team Elche CF in the 2003–04 season. He first appeared with the main squad of the former on 4 May 2003, playing 20 minutes in a 5–0 home win over Recreativo de Huelva.

Mallo joined Portugal's S.C. Braga for 2006–07 after being released. Because of injury to first choice Paulo Santos, he started the first half of the following campaign, also featuring for the club in the Portuguese and UEFA Cups.

In late January 2009, after having spent the first months of the new season training separately, Mallo joined Falkirk until the end of the season. He played in the Scottish Cup final, also helping the side to the semi-finals of the domestic League Cup and a final maintenance in the Scottish Premier League; despite these achievements, he did not sign a new contract and left the club on 27 June, stating he needed to move on.

In July 2009, Mallo turned down a move to join former manager John Hughes at Hibernian FC, opting to return to Spain and sign with Girona FC in the country's second division. In his first year he deputised for former FC Barcelona's Albert Jorquera, and played understudy to Roberto Santamaría in the following campaign, becoming the starter subsequently.

On 30 June 2016, after a further three years in the second tier with CD Lugo and Albacete Balompié, being relegated in the last one, the 37-year-old Mallo moved to the Indian Super League, joining three compatriots (including manager José Francisco Molina, his former Deportivo teammate) at Atlético de Kolkata.

== Personal life ==
Cambre's municipal ground was named after Mallo.

== Career statistics ==
Appearances and goals by club, season and competition
| Club | Season | League | | | Cup | | League cup | | Europe | | Other | | Total | |
| Club | Season | Division | Apps | Goals | Apps | Goals | Apps | Goals | Apps | Goals | Apps | Goals | Apps | Goals |
|---|---|---|---|---|---|---|---|---|---|---|---|---|---|---|
| Deportivo La Coruña | 2000–01 | La Liga | 0 | 0 | 0 | 0 | — | | 0 | 0 | — | | 0 | 0 |
| Deportivo La Coruña | 2001–02 | La Liga | 0 | 0 | 1 | 0 | — | | 0 | 0 | — | | 1 | 0 |
| Deportivo La Coruña | 2002–03 | La Liga | 2 | 0 | 1 | 0 | — | | 3 | 0 | — | | 6 | 0 |
| Deportivo La Coruña | 2004–05 | La Liga | 1 | 0 | 0 | 0 | — | | 0 | 0 | — | | 1 | 0 |
| Deportivo La Coruña | 2005–06 | La Liga | 0 | 0 | 0 | 0 | — | | — | | — | | 0 | 0 |
| Deportivo La Coruña | Total | | 3 | 0 | 2 | 0 | — | | 3 | 0 | — | | 8 | 0 |
| Elche (loan) | 2003–04 | Segunda División | 38 | 0 | 0 | 0 | — | | — | | — | | 38 | 0 |
| Braga | 2006–07 | Primeira Liga | 1 | 0 | 1 | 0 | — | | — | | — | | 2 | 0 |
| Braga | 2007–08 | Primeira Liga | 7 | 0 | 0 | 0 | 0 | 0 | 2 | 0 | — | | 9 | 0 |
| Braga | Total | | 8 | 0 | 1 | 0 | 0 | 0 | 2 | 0 | — | | 11 | 0 |
| Falkirk | 2008–09 | Scottish Premier League | 15 | 0 | 4 | 0 | 1 | 0 | 0 | 0 | — | | 20 | 0 |
| Girona | 2009–10 | Segunda División | 10 | 0 | 0 | 0 | — | | — | | — | | 10 | 0 |
| Girona | 2010–11 | Segunda División | 10 | 0 | 1 | 0 | — | | — | | — | | 11 | 0 |
| Girona | 2011–12 | Segunda División | 22 | 0 | 1 | 0 | — | | — | | — | | 23 | 0 |
| Girona | 2012–13 | Segunda División | 39 | 0 | 0 | 0 | — | | — | | 0 | 0 | 39 | 0 |
| Girona | Total | | 81 | 0 | 2 | 0 | — | | — | | 0 | 0 | 83 | 0 |
| Lugo | 2013–14 | Segunda División | 16 | 0 | 1 | 0 | — | | — | | — | | 17 | 0 |
| Lugo | 2014–15 | Segunda División | 14 | 0 | 2 | 0 | — | | — | | — | | 16 | 0 |
| Lugo | Total | | 30 | 0 | 3 | 0 | — | | — | | — | | 33 | 0 |
| Albacete | 2015–16 | Segunda División | 3 | 0 | — | | — | | — | | — | | 3 | 0 |
| Atlético Kolkata | 2016 | Indian Super League | 2 | 0 | — | | — | | — | | — | | 2 | 0 |
| Hospitalet | 2016–17 | Segunda División B | 12 | 0 | — | | — | | — | | — | | 12 | 0 |
| Career total | | | 192 | 0 | 12 | 0 | 1 | 0 | 5 | 0 | 0 | 0 | 210 | 0 |
