= Matt Ritchie =

English footballer (born 1989)

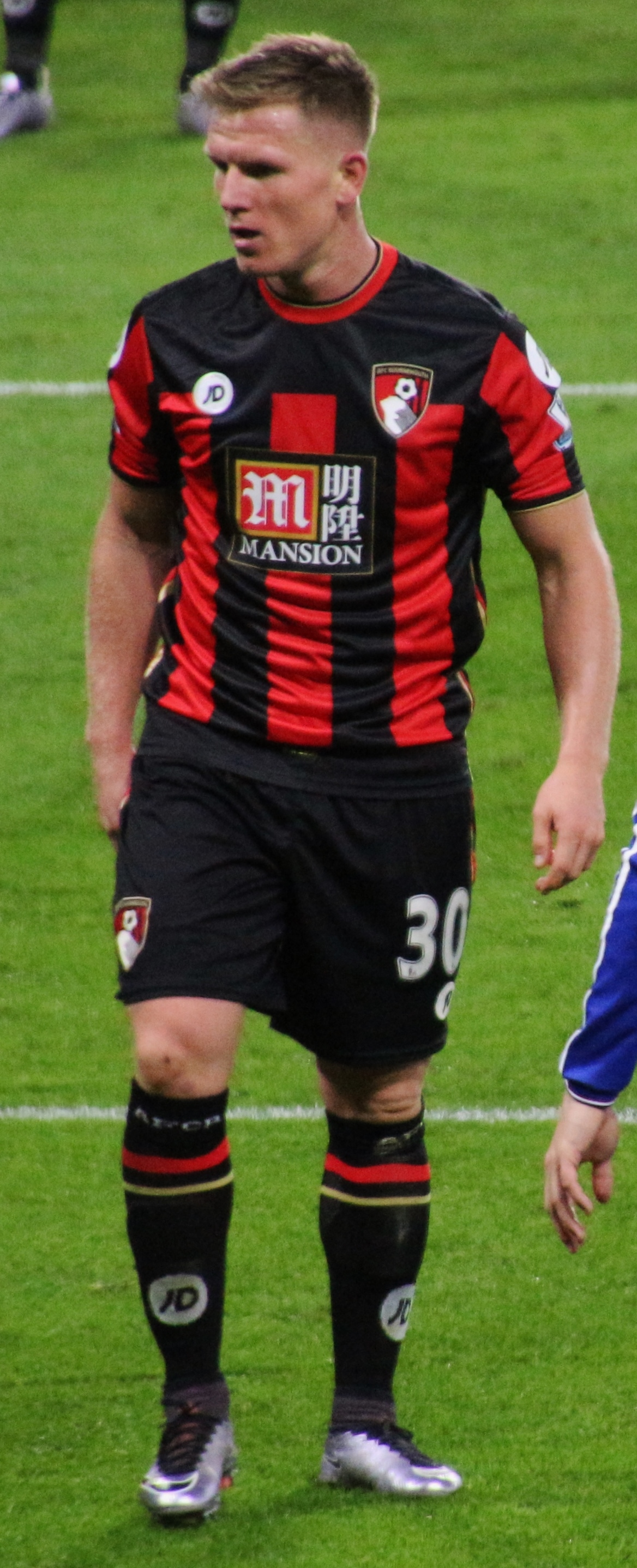
- Ritchie with Bournemouth in 2015

Personal information
- Full name: Matthew Thomas Ritchie
- Date of birth: 10 September 1989 (age 37)
- Place of birth: Gosport, England
- Height: 5 ft 7 in (1.70 m)
- Positions: Right winger; wing-back

Youth career
- 2002–2008: Portsmouth

Senior career*
Years	Team	Apps	(Gls)
2008–2011	Portsmouth	7	(0)
2008–2009	→ Dagenham & Redbridge (loan)	37	(11)
2009–2010	→ Notts County (loan)	16	(3)
2010–2011	→ Swindon Town (loan)	16	(3)
2011–2013	Swindon Town	91	(23)
2013–2016	Bournemouth	130	(31)
2016–2024	Newcastle United	187	(20)
2024–2025	Portsmouth	39	(5)
2025–2026	Reading	28	(1)
Total		551	(97)

International career
2015–2018	Scotland	16	(3)
- * Club domestic league appearances and goals

Matthew Thomas Ritchie (born 10 September 1989) is a former professional footballer who played as a winger or wing-back. He is currently serving as the technical director for Premier League club Bournemouth.

Prior to joining his first club Portsmouth for a second spell in 2024, he played for Swindon Town, Bournemouth and Newcastle United, and he then joined Reading in his final season as a player, retiring in 2026.

Although born and raised in England, Ritchie qualified to play for Scotland through his Scottish father Alex. He made his senior international debut for Scotland on 25 March 2015, in a friendly match against Northern Ireland, and won 16 caps for the country until 2018.

== Early life ==
Matthew Thomas Ritchie was born on 10 September 1989 in Gosport, Hampshire. His father Alex is from Edinburgh, Scotland. Ritchie attended Bay House School.

== Club career ==
=== Portsmouth ===
Ritchie had been involved in Portsmouth's academy since he turned 13, previously playing football locally in Gosport, starting at the age of six. After signing his first professional contract with the club, and a positive 2008–09 pre-season campaign, including a hat-trick in a 4–1 victory over hometown club Gosport Borough, after the match, Ritchie said scoring a hat-trick was 'unreal'.

He went on loan to Swindon Town in 2010 but due to Portsmouth's mounting injury list, he was recalled in March and was named on the bench for their 2–0 Premier League loss at the hands of Tottenham Hotspur after making four appearances for Swindon. On 14 April, he made his League debut for Portsmouth in the game against Wigan Athletic. He played 79 minutes but was then substituted for Frédéric Piquionne. After the match, Ritchie admits making his Portsmouth debut was a dream come true. At the end of the season, with Portsmouth's relegation from the Premier League confirmed, he signed a new two-year deal.

For the 2010–11 season, Ritchie was handed the number 5 shirt and was selected in Portsmouth's starting XI for their first match of the season at Coventry City. However, he soon found himself out of the Portsmouth line-up and, with the club having disbanded its reserve team, manager Steve Cotterill agreed to loan out the player for fitness reasons.

==== Loan to Dagenham & Redbridge ====
Ritchie played reserve and academy football at Pompey until late September and continued to impress until he was taken on a one-month loan deal by League Two club Dagenham & Redbridge. He made his Football League debut against Rotherham United on 27 September 2008, coming on as a late substitute. Ritchie scored on his first competitive start for the Daggers in a 2–0 win over Rochdale. He scored again in his next match, a 2–0 win over Barnet.

Ritchie also made clear his wishes to extend the loan deal until the end of the season. Dagenham announced on 30 December that the player would remain with the club until the end of the current season. His impressive performances saw him rewarded with a new two-year deal at Portsmouth, and their Young Player of the Season Award.

==== Loan to Notts County ====
On 28 July 2009, it was reported that Notts County, were in talks with Portsmouth over a six-figure fee for his services, believed to be £100,000. On 1 September 2009, Ritchie signed on loan until 31 December, although County wanted to extend his loan deal.

=== Loan to Swindon and permanent basis ===
After Danny Wilson failed to secure Ritchie's services on a permanent deal during the transfer window, it was announced on 11 February 2010 that Swindon Town had signed the midfielder on loan for the remainder of the season. He made his debut on 23 February against Stockport County after coming on for Danny Ward after 25 minutes.

After making a brief appearance for Pompey on 4 October, Ritchie was loaned again to Swindon Town, on a one-month deal. Two weeks later the deal was extended to two months.

On 7 January 2011, Swindon Town signed Ritchie on a two-and-a-half-year deal for an undisclosed fee. He added to his tally with goals against Bournemouth in a 3–2 loss, a 4–1 loss to Southampton, a 1–1 draw with Hartlepool United and a 2–1 loss against Notts County. Despite Swindon Town being relegated to League Two, Ritchie was named the Robins' Player of the Season.

Under manager Paolo Di Canio in League Two, he retained his first team place in the starting eleven and scoring form with ten goals that season. During the season, Ritchie was linked with League One clubs, with the likes of Bournemouth interested in signing the player. After Bournemouth's bid for him was rejected, manager Di Canio said that he was worth about £2 million. In March, he won the Football League Two Player of the Year for 2012. With teammate Paul Caddis he was named in the PFA League Two Team of the Year.

Ahead of a new season in League One, Swindon turned down a £900,000 offer from a League One club for Ritchie, insisting he would be sold for £2.5 million. Shortly afterwards he signed a new contract, keeping him at the club until 2014.

=== AFC Bournemouth ===
On 30 January 2013, Ritchie signed for Bournemouth on a three-and-a-half-year deal for £400,000. After leaving Swindon Town, he said that he was surprised to leave the club and that he had left with a "heavy heart". However, Di Canio claimed that the club sold Ritchie behind his back.

He made his debut on 2 February in a 3–0 win over Milton Keynes Dons. Ritchie scored his first goal for his new team on 23 March in a 4–1 win over Bury. That win was the first of an eight match run of successive wins, including a brace for Ritchie in a 3–1 victory over Notts County, that culminated in clinching promotion to the Championship.

He was a key performer for Bournemouth during the 2014–15 season. His form helped the side to top the Championship and won him international recognition with Scotland. By April, he had scored 11 goals and provided 13 assists for his team. Ritchie's form saw him voted the Football League's best player in a poll by FourFourTwo magazine.

On 19 September 2015, he scored his first ever goal in the Premier League, coming on for Bournemouth in a 2–0 home win against Sunderland. On 25 October 2015, Ritchie scored his team's only goal of the game after just one minute, in Bournemouth's 5–1 drubbing by Tottenham Hotspur.

=== Newcastle United ===
"I'm the penalty taker! Mitro is a striker, everyone wants to score as many goals as possible. I've been on penalties since Dwight missed one early doors. I wasn't going to give it up."

— Ritchie, speaking to Talksport, on the penalty incident against Preston.

On 1 July 2016, Ritchie signed a five-year contract with newly relegated Newcastle United, becoming the third signing under manager Rafael Benítez. He made his debut for the club in a 1–0 loss to Fulham, playing the full 90 minutes. His first goal, a penalty, came two matches later in a 4–1 win over Reading. From then on, Ritchie would become the club's designated penalty taker and had a 100% success rate in all competitions, converting from the spot five times. He was involved in two penalty related incidents over the course of the season. On 25 October, he refused to hand the ball to Aleksandar Mitrović, tucking it under his shirt, before scoring the third goal in a 6–0 win over Preston North End. On 5 April 2017, against Burton Albion, Ritchie scored a penalty, but it was not awarded due to encroachment by Dwight Gayle. However, referee Keith Stroud awarded a direct free kick to Burton, rather than allowing Ritchie to retake the penalty. Ultimately, it did not matter as he scored the winner anyway, to keep Newcastle in the promotion hunt. Ritchie's season was ended by suspension, when he argued with a match official after a home draw with Leeds United. Ritchie scored sixteen goals in all competitions, with only Gayle having netted more for the club throughout the season.

On 26 August, Ritchie assisted Ciaran Clark for the second goal of the match, as Newcastle got their first win of the season, beating West Ham United 3–0. He was then credited with the assists for the goals scored by Jamaal Lascelles and Christian Atsu in wins over Swansea City and Stoke City. On 28 November, he assisted both Newcastle goals from set-pieces in a 2–2 draw with West Bromwich Albion. In the second half of the season, Ritchie scored three times, all in home wins over Manchester United, Southampton and Arsenal.

On 11 August 2018, Ritchie set up Joselu for the equaliser, in a 2–1 home loss to Tottenham Hotspur. He was taken off in the second half, much to his disapproval; his emotional outburst on the bench was captured on television cameras.

In August 2019, he injured his ankle and was expected to be out of action for two months. Throughout the 2019–20 season, Ritchie would normally celebrate goals by assertively kicking the corner flag. On 18 January 2020, while celebrating Isaac Hayden's match-winning stoppage time goal against Chelsea, Ritchie, following tradition, kicked a corner flag, which hit a fan in the groin.

On 17 February 2024, Ritchie scored his first goal since 2020, a stoppage-time equaliser in a 2–2 draw against his former club Bournemouth. On 29 May, Newcastle announced Ritchie would be leaving when his contract expired in the summer. During his eight years with the club, he made 215 appearances and scored 25 goals.

=== Return to Portsmouth ===
In August 2024, Ritchie returned to his first club Portsmouth, signing a two-year deal, 13 years after he first left the club. On 10 August, Ritchie made his debut in his second spell at Portsmouth against Leeds United in a 3–3 away draw in the Championship. On 30 November, he scored his first goal for the club away to Swansea City in a 2–2 draw. On 18 January 2025, he scored his first goal at Fratton Park, scoring a brace in a 2–1 win against Middlesbrough.

On 28 August 2025, Ritchie departed Portsmouth after his contract was terminated by mutual agreement.

=== Reading ===
Following his exit from Portsmouth, Reading announced the signing of Ritchie on a two-year contract on 28 August 2025.

On 8 June 2026, Ritchie announced his retirement from professional football.

=== Return to Bournemouth as a staff member ===
That same day, Bournemouth announced Ritchie's appointment as technical director.

== International career ==
Under FIFA eligibility rules, Ritchie was eligible for the national teams of England, where he was born and raised, and Scotland, his father's native land. On 16 March 2015, he was called up to the Scotland national football team for a friendly against Northern Ireland and a UEFA Euro 2016 qualifier against Gibraltar. Ritchie made his debut against Northern Ireland on 25 March at Hampden Park, and took the 85th-minute corner which set up Christophe Berra's header for the only goal of the game. On 5 June he scored his first international goal, a 20-yard strike which was the only goal of a friendly victory over Qatar at Easter Road in Edinburgh. His second goal came in a European Championship qualifier against Poland at Hampden Park on 8 October 2015, for which he won "Goal of the Year" award from the Scottish FA.

After being involved consistently for Scotland until the end of 2016, Ritchie withdrew from several subsequent squads due to injuries – either unable to play at all, precautions over recurrence or having to rest during international breaks to improve his condition – appearing just once in 2017 and once in 2018. In November 2018, he requested not to be considered for selection for the 'foreseeable future' for reasons not disclosed by Scotland manager Alex McLeish.

== Personal life ==
He married his wife, Emma, in May 2015. They have two children, including a son named Harry (born 2016).

== Career statistics ==
=== Club ===
As of match played 1 March 2026

Appearances and goals by club, season and competition
Club	Season	League			FA Cup		League Cup		Other		Total	
Club	Season	Division	Apps	Goals	Apps	Goals	Apps	Goals	Apps	Goals	Apps	Goals
Portsmouth	2008–09	Premier League	0	0	0	0	0	0	0	0	0	0
Portsmouth	2009–10	Premier League	2	0	0	0	0	0	—		2	0
Portsmouth	2010–11	Championship	5	0	0	0	3	0	—		8	0
Portsmouth	Total		7	0	0	0	3	0	0	0	10	0
Dagenham & Redbridge (loan)	2008–09	League Two	37	11	3	1	—		1 (Note: Appearances in Football League Trophy)	0	41	12
Notts County (loan)	2009–10	League Two	16	3	2	0	—		1	0	19	3
Notts County (loan)	Total		53	14	5	1	0	0	2	0	60	15
Swindon Town (loan)	2009–10	League One	4	0	—		—		—		4	0
Swindon Town	2010–11	League One	36	7	3	1	—		2	0	41	8
Swindon Town	2011–12	League Two	40	10	4	1	2	0	6	0	52	11
Swindon Town	2012–13	League One	27	9	1	0	4	0	0	0	32	9
Swindon Town	Total		107	26	8	2	6	0	8	0	129	28
AFC Bournemouth	2012–13	League One	17	3	—		—		—		17	3
AFC Bournemouth	2013–14	Championship	30	9	2	0	0	0	—		32	9
AFC Bournemouth	2014–15	Championship	46	15	2	0	3	0	—		51	15
AFC Bournemouth	2015–16	Premier League	37	4	3	0	2	0	—		42	4
AFC Bournemouth	Total		130	31	7	0	5	0	—		142	31
Newcastle United	2016–17	Championship	42	12	3	2	3	2	—		48	16
Newcastle United	2017–18	Premier League	35	3	2	0	1	0	—		38	3
Newcastle United	2018–19	Premier League	36	2	3	1	0	0	—		39	3
Newcastle United	2019–20	Premier League	18	2	4	0	1	0	—		23	2
Newcastle United	2020–21	Premier League	18	0	1	0	2	0	—		21	0
Newcastle United	2021–22	Premier League	18	0	1	0	0	0	—		19	0
Newcastle United	2022–23	Premier League	7	0	1	0	2	0	—		10	0
Newcastle United	2023–24	Premier League	13	1	2	0	2	0	0	0	17	1
Newcastle United	Total		187	20	17	3	11	2	0	0	215	25
Portsmouth	2024–25	Championship	39	5	1	0	1	0	—		41	5
Reading	2025–26	League One	18	1	0	0	0	0	1	0	19	1
Career total			541	97	38	6	26	2	11	0	616	105

=== International ===
As of match played 23 March 2018

Appearances and goals by national team and year
National team	Year	Apps	Goals
Scotland	2015	7	2
Scotland	2016	7	1
Scotland	2017	1	0
Scotland	2018	1	0
Total		16	3

==== International goals ====
As of match played 29 March 2016. Scotland score listed first, score column indicates score after each Ritchie goal.

International goals by date, venue, cap, opponent, score, result and competition
No.	Date	Venue	Cap	Opponent	Score	Result	Competition
1	5 June 2015	Easter Road, Edinburgh, Scotland	3	Qatar	1–0	1–0	Friendly
2	7 October 2015	Hampden Park, Glasgow, Scotland	6	Poland	1–1	2–2	UEFA Euro 2016 qualification
3	29 March 2016	Hampden Park, Glasgow, Scotland	8	Denmark	1–0	1–0	Friendly

== Honours ==
Notts County

- Football League Two: 2009–10

Swindon Town

- Football League Two: 2011–12
- Football League Trophy runner-up: 2011–12

Bournemouth

- Football League Championship: 2014–15

Newcastle United

- EFL Championship: 2016–17
- EFL Cup runner-up: 2022–23

Individual

- Football League Two Player of the Year: 2011–12
- Football League One Player of the Year: 2012–13
- PFA Team of the Year: 2011–12 League Two, 2012–13 League One 2014–15 Championship
- SFWA International Player of the Year: 2015–16
- North-East FWA Player of the Year: 2017

== See also ==
- List of Scotland international footballers born outside Scotland
