= 2018–19 Newcastle United F.C. season =

Newcastle United
2018–19 season
- Owner: Mike Ashley
- Managing Director: Lee Charnley
- Manager: Rafael Benítez
- Stadium: St James' Park
- Premier League: 13th
- FA Cup: Fourth round (vs. Watford)
- EFL Cup: Second round (vs. Nottingham Forest)
- Top goalscorer: League: Ayoze Pérez (12); All: Ayoze Pérez (13)
- Highest home attendance: League/All: 52,242 (9 Mar 2019 v Everton, PL round 30)
- Lowest home attendance: League: 48,323 (26 Feb 2019 v Burnley, PL round 28); All: 34,604 (26 Jan 2019 v Watford, FA Cup, R4)
- Average home league attendance: 51,121
- Biggest win: 4–0 (12 May 2019 v Fulham, PL round 38)
- Biggest defeat: 0–4 (26 Dec 2018 v Liverpool, PL round 19)
Home colours	Away colours	Third colours

The 2018–19 season was Newcastle United's second season back in the Premier League following their promotion from the 2016–17 EFL Championship and their 24th year in the Premier League. This season Newcastle United participated in the Premier League, EFL Cup and FA Cup. This article covers the period of 1 July 2018 to 30 June 2019.

== Club ==
=== Coaching staff ===
The Newcastle United first team coaching staff for the 2018–19 season consisted of the following:

==== First Team ====
Position	Staff
Manager	(Spain) Rafael Benítez
Assistant Manager	(Spain) Francisco "Paco" de Míguel Moreno
First Team Coach	(Spain) Mikel Antía
First Team Coach	(Spain) Antonio Gómez Pérez
Goalkeeping Coach	(England) Simon Smith
Head of Medicine	(England) Paul Catterson
Rehabilitation Fitness Coach	(Spain) Cristian Fernández Martínez
Head of Physiotherapy	(England) Derek Wright
Physiotherapist	(Spain) Daniel Martí
Physiotherapist	(England) Michael Harding
Head of Recruitment	(England) Steve Nickson
Head of Analysis	(England) Kerry Morrow

== Squads ==
=== First-team squad ===
Squad No.	Name	Nationality	Position(s)	Date of birth (age)	Signed	Signed from
Goalkeepers
1	Rob Elliot	(Republic of Ireland) (Note: Elliot was born in Greenwich, England.)	GK	30 April 1986 (aged 33)	2011	(England) Charlton Athletic
12	Martin Dúbravka	(Slovakia)	GK	15 January 1989 (aged 30)	2018	(Czech Republic) Sparta Prague
26	Karl Darlow	(England)	GK	8 October 1990 (aged 28)	2014	(England) Nottingham Forest
41	Freddie Woodman	(England)	GK	4 March 1997 (aged 22)	2014	(England) Newcastle United Academy
Defenders
2	Ciaran Clark	(Republic of Ireland) (Note: Clark was born in Harrow, England.)	CB / LB	26 September 1989 (aged 29)	2016	(England) Aston Villa
3	Paul Dummett	(Wales) (Note: Dummett was born in Newcastle upon Tyne, England.)	LB / CB	26 September 1991 (aged 27)	2010	(England) Newcastle United Academy
5	Fabian Schär	(Switzerland)	CB / CM	20 December 1991 (aged 27)	2018	(Spain) Deportivo La Coruña
6	Jamaal Lascelles	(England)	CB	11 November 1993 (aged 25)	2014	(England) Nottingham Forest
18	Federico Fernández	(Argentina)	CB	21 February 1989 (aged 30)	2018	(Wales) Swansea City
19	Javier Manquillo	(Spain)	RB / LB / RWB / LWB	5 May 1994 (aged 25)	2017	(Spain) Atlético Madrid
20	Florian Lejeune	(France)	CB	20 May 1991 (aged 28)	2017	(Spain) Eibar
22	DeAndre Yedlin	(United States)	RB / RWB	9 July 1993 (aged 25)	2016	(England) Tottenham Hotspur
23	Antonio Barreca	(Italy)	LB / LWB	18 March 1995 (aged 24)	2019	(France) Monaco
Midfielders
4	Ki Sung-yueng	(South Korea)	CM	24 January 1989 (aged 30)	2018	(Wales) Swansea City
8	Jonjo Shelvey	(England)	CM	27 February 1992 (aged 27)	2016	(Wales) Swansea City
10	Mohamed Diamé	(Senegal)	CM	14 June 1987 (aged 32)	2016	(England) Hull City
11	Matt Ritchie	(Scotland) (Note: Ritchie was born in Gosport, England.)	RW / LW / LWB	10 September 1989 (aged 29)	2016	(England) AFC Bournemouth
14	Isaac Hayden	(England)	CM / DM	22 March 1995 (aged 24)	2016	(England) Arsenal
15	Kenedy	(Brazil)	LW / AM / LWB	8 February 1996 (aged 23)	2018	(England) Chelsea
24	Miguel Almirón	(Paraguay)	AM / LW	10 February 1994 (aged 25)	2019	(United States) Atlanta United
30	Christian Atsu	(Ghana)	RW / LW	10 January 1992 (aged 27)	2017	(England) Chelsea
36	Sean Longstaff	(England)	CM / AM	30 September 1997 (aged 21)	2016	(England) Newcastle United Academy
Forwards
9	Salomón Rondón	(Venezuela)	ST	16 September 1989 (aged 29)	2018	(England) West Bromwich Albion
13	Yoshinori Mutō	(Japan)	ST / SS	15 July 1992 (aged 26)	2018	(Germany) Mainz 05
17	Ayoze Pérez	(Spain)	SS	29 July 1993 (aged 25)	2014	(Spain) Tenerife
21	Joselu	(Spain) (Note: Joselu was born in Stuttgart, Germany.)	ST	27 March 1990 (aged 29)	2017	(England) Stoke City
Out on loan
7	Jacob Murphy	(England)	RW / LW	24 February 1995 (aged 24)	2017	(England) Norwich City
25	Jamie Sterry	(England)	RB	21 November 1995 (aged 23)	2015	(England) Newcastle United Academy
37	Callum Roberts	(England)	RW / LW	14 April 1997 (aged 22)	2014	(England) Newcastle United Academy
57	Achraf Lazaar	(Morocco)	LB / LW	22 January 1992 (aged 27)	2016	(Italy) Palermo
–	Daniel Barlaser	(England)	CM / AM	18 January 1997 (aged 22)	2015	(England) Newcastle United Academy
–	Henri Saivet	(Senegal)	CM / AM	26 October 1990 (aged 28)	2016	(France) Bordeaux
–	Jack Colback	(England)	DM / CM	24 October 1989 (aged 29)	2014	(England) Sunderland
–	Rolando Aarons	(England) (Note: Aarons was born in Kingston, Jamaica.)	LW	16 November 1995 (aged 23)	2014	(England) Newcastle United Academy
–	Dwight Gayle	(England)	ST	17 October 1989 (aged 29)	2016	(England) Crystal Palace

== Transfers and loans ==
=== Transfers in ===
Date from	Position	Number	Nationality	Name	From	Fee	Ref.
1 July 2018	GK	12	(Slovakia)	Martin Dúbravka	(Czech Republic) Sparta Prague	£4,000,000	
1 July 2018	CM	4	(South Korea)	Ki Sung-yueng	(Wales) Swansea City	Free transfer	
26 July 2018	CB	5	(Switzerland)	Fabian Schär	(Spain) Deportivo La Coruña	£3,000,000	
3 August 2018	FW	13	(Japan)	Yoshinori Mutō	(Germany) Mainz 05	£9,500,000	
9 August 2018	CB	18	(Argentina)	Federico Fernández	(Wales) Swansea City	£6,000,000	
31 January 2019	AM	24	(Paraguay)	Miguel Almirón	(United States) Atlanta United	£21,000,000	

- Total spending: ▼£43,500,000

=== Transfers out ===
Date from	Position	Number	Nationality	Name	To	Fee	Ref.
1 July 2018	RW	—	(England)	Yasin Ben El-Mhanni	Scunthorpe United	Released	
1 July 2018	CB	—	(Scotland)	Kyle Cameron	(England) Torquay United	Released	
1 July 2018	CB	—	(Scotland)	Stuart Findlay	(Scotland) Kilmarnock	Released	
1 July 2018	RB	27	(Spain)	Jesús Gámez	Free agent	Released	
1 July 2018	CB	—	(England)	Macaulay Gillesphey	(England) Carlisle United	Released	
1 July 2018	RW	—	(England)	Alex Gilliead	(England) Shrewsbury Town	Released	
1 July 2018	CB	38	(Australia)	Curtis Good	(Australia) Melbourne City	Released	
1 July 2018	LB	25	(France)	Massadio Haïdara	(France) Lens	Released	
1 July 2018	LW	—	(England)	Callum Smith	(England) Hull City	Released	
1 July 2018	CM	—	(England)	Liam Smith	Free agent	Released	
1 July 2018	GK	—	(England)	Paul Woolston	(England) Manchester United	Released	
12 July 2018	CM	23	(Spain)	Mikel Merino	(Spain) Real Sociedad	£10,000,000	
23 July 2018	CB	18	(Democratic Republic of the Congo)	Chancel Mbemba	(Portugal) Porto	£7,000,000	
26 July 2018	GK	—	(Belgium)	Matz Sels	(France) Strasbourg	£3,500,000	
30 July 2018	FW	45	(Serbia)	Aleksandar Mitrović	(England) Fulham	£22,000,000	
6 August 2018	FW	—	(England)	Adam Armstrong	(England) Blackburn Rovers	£1,750,000	
9 August 2018	FW	—	(England)	Ivan Toney	(England) Peterborough United	Undisclosed	

- Total incoming: ▲ ~ £44,250,000

=== Loans in ===
Date from	Position	Number	Nationality	Name	From	Expiry	Ref.
12 July 2018	LW	15	(Brazil)	Kenedy	(England) Chelsea	31 May 2019	
6 August 2018	ST	9	(Venezuela)	Salomón Rondón	(England) West Bromwich Albion	31 May 2019	
31 January 2019	LB	23	(Italy)	Antonio Barreca	(France) Monaco	31 May 2019	

=== Loans out ===
Date from	Position	Number	Nationality	Name	To	Expiry	Ref.
20 July 2018	DM	—	(England)	Jack Colback	(England) Nottingham Forest	31 May 2019	
6 August 2018	ST	9	(England)	Dwight Gayle	(England) West Bromwich Albion	31 May 2019	
10 August 2018	CB	—	(England)	Josef Yarney	(England) Morecambe	9 January 2019	
25 August 2018	CM	—	(Senegal)	Henri Saivet	(Turkey) Bursaspor	31 May 2019	
31 August 2018	CM	—	(England)	Daniel Barlaser	(England) Accrington Stanley	31 May 2019	
31 August 2018	ST	—	(England)	Luke Charman	(England) Accrington Stanley	9 January 2019	
7 September 2018	LW	—	(England)	Rolando Aarons	(Czech Republic) Slovan Liberec	December 2018	
10 January 2019	LB	—	(England)	Liam Gibson	(England) Accrington Stanley	31 May 2019	
21 January 2019	ST	—	(Denmark)	Elias Sørensen	(England) Blackpool	31 May 2019	
26 January 2019	RB	25	(England)	Jamie Sterry	(England) Crewe Alexandra	31 May 2019	
31 January 2019	LW	—	(England)	Rolando Aarons	(England) Sheffield Wednesday	31 May 2019	
31 January 2019	LB	57	(Morocco)	Achraf Lazaar	(England) Sheffield Wednesday	31 May 2019	
31 January 2019	RW	7	(England)	Jacob Murphy	(England) West Bromwich Albion	31 May 2019	
31 January 2019	LW	37	(England)	Callum Roberts	(England) Colchester United	31 May 2019	
31 January 2019	CB	—	(England)	Josef Yarney	(England) Chesterfield	31 May 2019	

== Pre-season and friendlies ==
As of 14 June 2018, Newcastle United have announced five pre-season friendlies against St Patrick's Athletic, Hull City, FC Porto, S.C. Braga and FC Augsburg.

On 7 February 2019, Newcastle United confirmed a mid-season training camp in Spain which included a friendly against CSKA Moscow.

17 July 2018 Friendly	St Patrick's Athletic	0–2	Newcastle United	Dublin
19:45		Report	Longstaff 42'; Atsu 86' (pen.)	Stadium: Richmond Park; Referee: Robert Rogers (Republic of Ireland)

24 July 2018 Friendly	Hull City	2–2	Newcastle United	Kingston upon Hull
19:45	Batty 41'; Evandro 61'	Report	Joselu 15'; Pérez 87'	Stadium: KCOM Stadium; Attendance: 6,288

28 July 2018 Friendly	Porto	0–0	Newcastle United	Porto
20:10		Report		Stadium: Estádio do Dragão; Attendance: 43,829

1 August 2018 Friendly	Braga	4–0	Newcastle United	Braga
19:30	Horta 52'; Novais 77', 85'; Sousa 90'			Stadium: Estádio Municipal de Braga

4 August 2018 Friendly	Newcastle United	0–1	FC Augsburg	Newcastle upon Tyne
15:00		Report	Gregoritsch 61'	Stadium: St James' Park

16 February 2019 Friendly	CSKA Moscow	1–1	Newcastle United	Murcia
12:00 (CET)	Hernández 40'	Report	Rondón 16'	Stadium: Pinatar Arena; Referee: Rafael Sánchez López

== Competitions ==
=== Overall summary ===
Competition	Started round	Current position / round	Final position / round	First match	Last match
Premier League	–	13th	–	11 August 2018	12 May 2019
EFL Cup	Second round	–	Second round	29 August 2018	29 August 2018
FA Cup	Third round	–	Fourth round	5 January 2019	26 January 2019

=== Overview ===
Competition	Record							
Competition	P	W	D	L	GF	GA	GD	Win %
Premier League	38	12	9	17	42	48	−6	31.58
EFL Cup	1	0	0	1	1	3	−2	0.00
FA Cup	3	1	1	1	5	5	+0	33.33
Total	42	13	10	19	48	56	−8	30.95

Source: Competitions

=== Premier League ===
==== League table ====
Pos	Team	Pld	W	D	L	GF	GA	GD	Pts
11	Watford	38	14	8	16	52	59	−7	50
12	Crystal Palace	38	14	7	17	51	53	−2	49
13	Newcastle United	38	12	9	17	42	48	−6	45
14	Bournemouth	38	13	6	19	56	70	−14	45
15	Burnley	38	11	7	20	45	68	−23	40

Source: Premier League
Rules for classification: 1) Points; 2) Goal difference; 3) Goals scored; 4) Play-offs (only if needed to decide champion, teams for relegation or teams for UEFA competitions).

==== Results summary ====
Overall								Home						Away					
Pld	W	D	L	GF	GA	GD	Pts	W	D	L	GF	GA	GD	W	D	L	GF	GA	GD
38	12	9	17	42	48	−6	45	8	1	10	24	25	−1	4	8	7	18	23	−5

Last updated: 4 May 2019.
Source: Premier League

==== Results by matchday ====
Round	1	2	3	4	5	6	7	8	9	10	11	12	13	14	15	16	17	18	19	20	21	22	23	24	25	26	27	28	29	30	31	32	33	34	35	36	37	38
Ground	H	A	H	A	H	A	H	A	H	A	H	H	A	H	A	H	A	H	A	A	H	A	H	H	A	A	H	H	A	H	A	A	H	A	H	A	H	A
Result	L	D	L	L	L	D	L	L	L	D	W	W	W	L	D	L	W	D	L	D	L	L	W	W	L	D	W	W	L	W	D	L	L	W	W	D	L	W
Position	14	13	16	18	19	18	18	19	20	19	17	14	13	15	14	15	14	15	15	15	15	18	17	14	15	16	14	13	14	13	13	14	15	13	12	13	14	13

Updated to match(es) played on 12 May 2019. Source:
A = Away; H = Home; W = Win; D = Draw; L = Loss

==== Matches ====
On 14 June 2018, the Premier League fixtures for the forthcoming season were announced.

11 August 2018 1	Newcastle United	1–2	Tottenham Hotspur	Newcastle upon Tyne
12:30 BST	Joselu 11', (yellow card) 58'; Diamé (yellow card) 90'	Report	Vertonghen 8'; Alli 18'; Dier (yellow card) 42'; Kane (yellow card) 68'	Stadium: St James' Park; Attendance: 51,749 (3,099 away); Referee: Martin Atkinson
Note: Live on Sky Sports

18 August 2018 2	Cardiff City	0–0	Newcastle United	Cardiff
12:30 BST	Camarasa (yellow card) 62'; Arter (yellow card) 80'	Report	Ritchie (yellow card) 3'; Manquillo (yellow card) 30'; Hayden (red card) 66'	Stadium: Cardiff City Stadium; Attendance: 30,720 (2,189 away); Referee: Craig Pawson
Note: Live on Sky Sports

26 August 2018 3	Newcastle United	1–2	Chelsea	Newcastle upon Tyne
16:00 BST	Joselu 83'	Report	Hazard 76' (pen.); Yedlin 87' (o.g.)	Stadium: St James' Park; Attendance: 51,791 (3,263 away); Referee: Paul Tierney
Note: Live on Sky Sports

1 September 2018 4	Manchester City	2–1	Newcastle United	Manchester
17:30 BST	Sterling 8'; Walker 52'	Report	Yedlin 30'	Stadium: City of Manchester Stadium; Attendance: 53,946 (2,646 away); Referee: Kevin Friend
Note: Live on BT Sport

15 September 2018 5	Newcastle United	1–2	Arsenal	Newcastle upon Tyne
15:00 BST	Clark 90+1'	Report	Xhaka 49'; Özil 58'	Stadium: St James' Park; Attendance: 52,165 (3,200 away); Referee: Lee Probert

22 September 2018 6	Crystal Palace	0–0	Newcastle United	Selhurst, London
15:00 BST	Tomkins (yellow card) 51'	Report	Yedlin (yellow card) 36'	Stadium: Selhurst Park; Attendance: 25,679 (2,967 away); Referee: Andre Marriner

29 September 2018 7	Newcastle United	0–2	Leicester City	Newcastle upon Tyne
15:00 BST		Report	Vardy 30'; Maguire 73'	Stadium: St James' Park; Attendance: 51,523 (2,975 away); Referee: Simon Hooper

6 October 2018 8	Manchester United	3–2	Newcastle United	Manchester
17:30 BST	Shaw (yellow card) 45'; Pogba (yellow card) 63'; Mata 70'; Martial 76'; Sánchez 90'	Report	Kenedy 7'; Muto 10'; Ritchie (yellow card) 58'; Diamé (yellow card) 69'	Stadium: Old Trafford; Attendance: 74,519 (2,579 away); Referee: Anthony Taylor
Note: Live on BT Sport

20 October 2018 9	Newcastle United	0–1	Brighton & Hove Albion	Newcastle upon Tyne
15:00 BST		Report	Kayal 29', (yellow card) 43'; Jahanbakhsh (yellow card) 74'	Stadium: St James' Park; Attendance: 50,329 (1,656 away); Referee: Andre Marriner

27 October 2018 10	Southampton	0–0	Newcastle United	Southampton
15:00 BST		Report	Atsu (yellow card) 90'	Stadium: St Mary's Stadium; Attendance: 30,736 (2,484 away); Referee: Chris Kavanagh

3 November 2018 11	Newcastle United	1–0	Watford	Newcastle upon Tyne
15:00 GMT	Pérez 65'; Schär (yellow card) 90+2'	Report	Capoue (yellow card) 38'; Hughes (yellow card) 64'; Okaka (yellow card) 84'; Holebas (yellow card) 90+2'; Gray (yellow card) 90+4'	Stadium: St James' Park; Attendance: 49,157 (1,195 away); Referee: Craig Pawson

10 November 2018 12	Newcastle United	2–1	Bournemouth	Newcastle upon Tyne
15:00 GMT	Rondón 7', 40', (yellow card) 90+3'; Schär (yellow card) 45'	Report	Lerma 45+6'; L Cook (yellow card) 90+3'	Stadium: St James' Park; Attendance: 49,266 (1,014 away); Referee: Lee Probert

26 November 2018 13	Burnley	1–2	Newcastle United	Burnley
20:30 GMT	Vokes 40'	Report	Mee 4' (o.g.); Clark 23'; Ritchie (yellow card) 90+4'	Stadium: Turf Moor; Attendance: 20,628 (2,458 away); Referee: Anthony Taylor
Note: Live on Sky Sports

1 December 2018 14	Newcastle United	0–3	West Ham United	Newcastle upon Tyne
15:00 GMT	Ritchie (yellow card) 41'; Schär (yellow card) 79'; Yedlin (yellow card) 89'	Report	Hernández 11', 63'; Snodgrass (yellow card) 21'; Noble (yellow card) 32'; Zabaleta (yellow card) 43'; Anderson 90+3'	Stadium: St James' Park; Attendance: 51,853 (3,149 away); Referee: Paul Tierney

5 December 2018 15	Everton	1–1	Newcastle United	Liverpool
19:45 GMT	Richarlison 38'	Report	Rondón 19'	Stadium: Goodison Park; Attendance: 39,350 (1,800 away); Referee: Lee Mason

9 December 2018 16	Newcastle United	1–2	Wolverhampton Wanderers	Newcastle upon Tyne
16:00 GMT	Ki Sung-yueng (yellow card) 18'; Pérez 23'; Yedlin (red card) 57'; Clark (yellow card) 90+6'	Report	Jota 17', (yellow card) 73'; Doherty (yellow card) 33', (goal) 90+4'; Costa (yellow card) 65'; Coady (yellow card) 72'; Bennett (yellow card) 80'	Stadium: St James' Park; Attendance: 50,223 (3,183 away); Referee: Mike Dean
Note: Live on Sky Sports

15 December 2018 17	Huddersfield Town	0–1	Newcastle United	Huddersfield
15:00 GMT	Hogg (yellow card) 72'	Report	Lascelles (yellow card) 34'; Rondón 55'	Stadium: Kirklees Stadium; Attendance: 24,036 (2,250 away); Referee: Anthony Taylor

22 December 2018 18	Newcastle United	0–0	Fulham	Newcastle upon Tyne
15:00 GMT	Kenedy (yellow card) 89'	Report	Kamara (yellow card) 84'; Seri (yellow card) 87'	Stadium: St James' Park; Attendance: 51,237 (985 away); Referee: Martin Atkinson

26 December 2018 19	Liverpool	4–0	Newcastle United	Liverpool
15:00 GMT	Lovren 11'; Salah 47' (pen.); Shaqiri 79'; Fabinho 85'	Report		Stadium: Anfield; Attendance: 53,318 (2,956 away); Referee: Graham Scott

29 December 2018 20	Watford	1–1	Newcastle United	Watford
15:00 GMT	Doucouré 82'	Report	Rondón 29'	Stadium: Vicarage Road; Attendance: 20,336 (2,074 away); Referee: Roger East

2 January 2019 21	Newcastle United	0–2	Manchester United	Newcastle upon Tyne
20:00 GMT	Lascelles (yellow card) 28'	Report	Lindelöf (yellow card) 46'; Lukaku 64'; Shaw (yellow card) 75'; Rashford 80'	Stadium: St James' Park; Attendance: 52,217 (3,041 away); Referee: Andre Marriner
Note: Live on Sky Sports

12 January 2019 22	Chelsea	2–1	Newcastle United	Fulham, London
17:30 GMT	Pedro 9'; Willian 57'; Jorginho (yellow card) 63'	Report	Ritchie (yellow card) 24'; Clark 40'	Stadium: Stamford Bridge; Attendance: 40,491 (2,791 away); Referee: Chris Kavanagh
Note: Live on BT Sport

19 January 2019 23	Newcastle United	3–0	Cardiff City	Newcastle upon Tyne
15:00 GMT	Schär 24', 63'; Pérez 90+3'	Report	Camarasa (yellow card) 46'	Stadium: St James' Park; Attendance: 49,864 (1,575 away); Referee: Stuart Attwell

29 January 2019 24	Newcastle United	2–1	Manchester City	Newcastle upon Tyne
20:00 GMT	Pérez (yellow card) 54'; Rondón 66'; Schär (yellow card) 72'; Ritchie 80' (pen.)	Report	Agüero 1'; De Bruyne (yellow card) 17'; Sterling (yellow card) 34'; Laporte (yellow card) 90+1'	Stadium: St James' Park; Attendance: 50,861 (3,186 away); Referee: Paul Tierney
Note: Live on BT Sport

2 February 2019 25	Tottenham Hotspur	1–0	Newcastle United	Wembley, London
12:30 GMT	Son Heung-min 83'	Report	Yedlin (yellow card) 65'	Stadium: Wembley Stadium; Attendance: 41,219 (3,200 away); Referee: Andre Marriner
Note: Live on Sky Sports

11 February 2019 26	Wolverhampton Wanderers	1–1	Newcastle United	Wolverhampton
20:00 GMT	Jota (yellow card) 51'; Boly 90+5'	Report	Ritchie (yellow card) 44'; Schär (yellow card) 51'; Hayden 56'; Lascelles (yellow card) 68'	Stadium: Molineux Stadium; Attendance: 30,687 (2,402 away); Referee: Graham Scott
Note: Live on Sky Sports

23 February 2019 27	Newcastle United	2–0	Huddersfield Town	Newcastle upon Tyne
15:00 GMT	Yedlin (yellow card) 27'; Rondón 46'; Pérez 52'; Ritchie (yellow card) 57'	Report	Smith (red card) 20'	Stadium: St James' Park; Attendance: 52,174 (2,326 away); Referee: Kevin Friend

26 February 2019 28	Newcastle United	2–0	Burnley	Newcastle upon Tyne
20:00 GMT	Longstaff (yellow card) 22' (goal) 38'; Schär 24'	Report	Mee (yellow card) 39'; Hendrick (yellow card) 60'; Crouch (yellow card) 88'	Stadium: St James' Park; Attendance: 48,323 (1,345 away); Referee: Craig Pawson
Note: Live on BT Sport

2 March 2019 29	West Ham United	2–0	Newcastle United	Stratford, London
17:30 GMT	Rice 7'; Noble (yellow card) 26', (goal) 42' (pen.); Masuaku (yellow card) 67'; Diop (yellow card) 88'	Report	Schär (yellow card) 37'; Longstaff (yellow card) 40'; Hayden (yellow card) 67'; Dúbravka (yellow card) 85'	Stadium: Olympic Stadium; Attendance: 59,910 (3,000 away); Referee: Chris Kavanagh
Note: Live on Sky Sports

9 March 2019 30	Newcastle United	3–2	Everton	Newcastle upon Tyne
15:00 GMT	Ritchie (penalty missed) 31'; Lascelles (yellow card) 42'; Rondón 65'; Schär (yellow card) 70'; Pérez 81', 84'; Shelvey (yellow card) 89'	Report	Calvert-Lewin 18'; Richarlison 32'; Kenny (yellow card) 53'	Stadium: St James' Park; Attendance: 52,242 (3,231 away); Referee: Lee Mason

16 March 2019 31	Bournemouth	2–2	Newcastle United	Bournemouth
15:00 GMT	Lerma (yellow card) 19'; Ibe (yellow card) 45+4'; King 48' (pen.), 81'; Daniels (yellow card) 83'	Report	Pérez (yellow card) 9'; Rondón 45+5'; Hayden (yellow card) 75'; Ritchie 90+4'	Stadium: Vitality Stadium; Attendance: 10,625 (1,319 away); Referee: Mike Dean

1 April 2019 32	Arsenal	2–0	Newcastle United	Holloway, London
20:00 GMT	Ramsey 30'; Monreal (yellow card) 59'; Kolašinac (yellow card) 73'; Lacazette 83'	Report	Diamé (yellow card) 72'	Stadium: Emirates Stadium; Attendance: 59,869 (3,000 away); Referee: Anthony Taylor
Note: Live on Sky Sports

6 April 2019 33	Newcastle United	0–1	Crystal Palace	Newcastle upon Tyne
15:00 BST	Hayden (yellow card) 79'	Report	Kelly (yellow card) 45+2'; Milivojević 81' (pen.); Benteke (yellow card) 90+4'	Stadium: St James' Park; Attendance: 51,926 (1,628 away); Referee: Stuart Attwell

12 April 2019 34	Leicester City	0–1	Newcastle United	Leicester
20:00 BST	Tielemans (yellow card) 41'; Schmeichel (yellow card) 68'	Report	Pérez 32'; Ki Sung-yueng (yellow card) 63'; Schär (yellow card) 74'; Manquillo (yellow card) 78'	Stadium: King Power Stadium; Attendance: 32,108 (3,300 away); Referee: Chris Kavanagh
Note: Live on Sky Sports

20 April 2019 35	Newcastle United	3–1	Southampton	Newcastle upon Tyne
17:30 BST	Pérez 27', 31', 86'	Report	Ward-Prowse (yellow card) 23'; Lemina 59'; Romeu (yellow card) 62'	Stadium: St James' Park; Attendance: 52,191 (1,700 away); Referee: Anthony Taylor
Note: Live on BT Sport

27 April 2019 36	Brighton & Hove Albion	1–1	Newcastle United	Falmer
17:30 BST	Andone (yellow card) 11'; Groß 75'; Bissouma (yellow card) 78'	Report	Pérez 18'; Dummett (yellow card) 25'; Ritchie (yellow card) 45'; Muto (yellow card) 84'	Stadium: Falmer Stadium; Attendance: 30,587 (2,984 away); Referee: Mike Dean
Note: Live on BT Sport

4 May 2019 37	Newcastle United	2–3	Liverpool	Newcastle upon Tyne
19:45 BST	Atsu 20'; Schär (yellow card) 45+2'; Rondón 54'	Report	Van Dijk 13'; Salah 28'; Origi 86'; Milner (yellow card) 90+2'	Stadium: St James' Park; Attendance: 52,206 (3,231 away); Referee: Andre Marriner
Note: Live on Sky Sports

12 May 2019 38	Fulham	0–4	Newcastle United	Fulham, London
15:00 BST	Bryan (yellow card) 59'	Report	Shelvey 9'; Perez 11'; Schar 61'; Rondon 90'	Stadium: Craven Cottage; Attendance: 24,979 (2,700 away); Referee: Kevin Friend

=== EFL Cup ===
The second round draw was made from the Stadium of Light on 16 August.

29 August 2018 Second round	Nottingham Forest	3–1	Newcastle United	West Bridgford, Nottingham
19:45	Murphy 2'; Cash 90+4'; Dias 90+7'	Report	Rondón 90+2'	Stadium: City Ground; Attendance: 13,942; Referee: Jeremy Simpson
Note: Live on Sky Sports

=== FA Cup ===
The third round draw was made live on BBC by Ruud Gullit and Paul Ince from Stamford Bridge on 3 December 2018. The fourth round draw was made live on BBC by Robbie Keane and Carl Ikeme from Wolverhampton on 7 January 2019.

5 January 2019 Third round	Newcastle United	1–1	Blackburn Rovers	Newcastle upon Tyne
17:30 GMT	Ritchie 84' (pen.)	Report	Dack 56'	Stadium: St James' Park; Attendance: 36,440; Referee: Kevin Friend

15 January 2019 Third round replay	Blackburn Rovers	2–4 (a.e.t.)	Newcastle United	Blackburn
19:45 GMT	Armstrong 33'; Lenihan 45+1'	Report	Longstaff 1'; Roberts 22'; Fernández (yellow card) 90+3'; Joselu 105+3'; Pérez 106'	Stadium: Ewood Park; Attendance: 14,228; Referee: Lee Probert
Note: Live on BT Sport

26 January 2019 Fourth round	Newcastle United	0–2	Watford	Newcastle upon Tyne
15:00 GMT	Longstaff (yellow card) 90+3'	Report	Wilmot (yellow card) 56'; Gray 61'; Chalobah (yellow card) 64'; Britos (yellow card) 75'; Success 90'	Stadium: St James' Park; Attendance: 34,604; Referee: David Coote

== Statistics ==
=== Appearances and goals ===
Last updated on 12 May 2019.

No.	Pos	Nat	Player	Total		Premier League		EFL Cup		FA Cup	
No.	Pos	Nat	Player	Apps	Goals	Apps	Goals	Apps	Goals	Apps	Goals
Goalkeepers
12	GK	(Slovakia) SVK	Martin Dúbravka	38	0	38	0	0	0	0	0
26	GK	(England) ENG	Karl Darlow	1	0	0	0	1	0	0	0
41	GK	(England) ENG	Freddie Woodman	3	0	0	0	0	0	3	0
Defenders
2	DF	(Republic of Ireland) IRL	Ciaran Clark	14	3	9+2	3	1	0	2	0
3	DF	(Wales) WAL	Paul Dummett	25	0	20+5	0	0	0	0	0
5	DF	(Switzerland) SUI	Fabian Schär	28	4	22+2	4	1	0	2+1	0
6	DF	(England) ENG	Jamaal Lascelles	33	0	32	0	0	0	0+1	0
18	DF	(Argentina) ARG	Federico Fernández	22	0	17+2	0	1	0	2	0
19	DF	(Spain) ESP	Javier Manquillo	21	0	12+6	0	0	0	3	0
20	DF	(France) FRA	Florian Lejeune	12	0	11	0	0	0	1	0
22	DF	(United States) USA	DeAndre Yedlin	28	1	27+1	1	0	0	0	0
23	DF	(Italy) ITA	Antonio Barreca	1	0	0+1	0	0	0	0	0
Midfielders
4	MF	(South Korea) KOR	Ki Sung-yueng	18	0	14+3	0	1	0	0	0
8	MF	(England) ENG	Jonjo Shelvey	17	1	10+6	1	0	0	0+1	0
10	MF	(Senegal) SEN	Mohamed Diamé	28	0	23+5	0	0	0	0	0
11	MF	(Scotland) SCO	Matt Ritchie	38	3	34+1	2	0	0	3	1
14	MF	(England) ENG	Isaac Hayden	27	1	20+4	1	0	0	2+1	0
15	MF	(Brazil) BRA	Kenedy	27	1	14+10	1	1	0	2	0
24	MF	(Paraguay) PAR	Miguel Almirón	10	0	9+1	0	0	0	0	0
30	MF	(Ghana) GHA	Christian Atsu	31	1	14+13	1	1	0	1+2	0
36	MF	(England) ENG	Sean Longstaff	13	2	8+1	1	1	0	3	1
Forward
9	FW	(Venezuela) VEN	Salomón Rondón	32	12	29+2	11	0+1	1	0	0
13	FW	(Japan) JPN	Yoshinori Mutō	17	1	5+11	1	1	0	0	0
17	FW	(Spain) ESP	Ayoze Pérez	40	13	33+3	12	0+1	0	0+3	1
21	FW	(Spain) ESP	Joselu	20	3	5+11	2	1	0	3	1
Player(s) who left on loan but featured this season
7	MF	(England) ENG	Jacob Murphy	13	0	4+5	0	1	0	3	0
25	DF	(England) ENG	Jamie Sterry	3	0	0	0	1	0	2	0
37	MF	(England) ENG	Callum Roberts	1	1	0	0	0	0	1	1

=== Goals ===
Last updated on 12 May 2019.

Place	Position	Number	Nation	Name	Premier League	EFL Cup	FA Cup	Total
1	FW	17	(Spain)	Ayoze Pérez	12	0	1	13
2	FW	9	(Venezuela)	Salomón Rondón	11	1	0	12
3	CB	2	(Switzerland)	Fabian Schär	4	0	0	4
4	CB	5	(Republic of Ireland)	Ciaran Clark	3	0	0	3
4	FW	21	(Spain)	Joselu	2	0	1	3
4	MF	11	(Scotland)	Matt Ritchie	2	0	1	3
5	MF	36	(England)	Sean Longstaff	1	0	1	2
6	FW	13	(Japan)	Yoshinori Muto	1	0	0	1
6	MF	15	(Brazil)	Kenedy	1	0	0	1
6	RB	22	(United States)	DeAndre Yedlin	1	0	0	1
6	MF	14	(England)	Isaac Hayden	1	0	0	1
6	MF	14	(England)	Jonjo Shelvey	1	0	0	1
6	MF	14	(Ghana)	Christian Atsu	1	0	0	1
7	MF	37	(England)	Callum Roberts	0	0	1	1
Own Goals					1	0	0	1
TOTALS					42	1	5	48

=== Clean sheets ===
Last updated on 12 May 2019.

Place	Number	Nation	Name	Matches Played	Premier League	EFL Cup	FA Cup	Total
1	12	(Slovakia)	Martin Dúbravka	38	11	0	0	11
2	26	(England)	Karl Darlow	1	0	0	0	0
2	1	(Republic of Ireland)	Rob Elliot	0	0	0	0	0
2	41	(England)	Freddie Woodman	2	0	0	0	0
TOTALS					11	0	0	11
