= 2019–20 Newcastle United F.C. season =

Newcastle United
2019–20 season
- Owner: Mike Ashley
- Managing Director: Lee Charnley
- Head coach: Steve Bruce
- Stadium: St James' Park
- Premier League: 13th
- FA Cup: Quarter-finals
- EFL Cup: Second round
- Top goalscorer: League: Jonjo Shelvey (6 goals); All: Miguel Almirón (8 goals)
- Highest home attendance: 52,221 (25 January 2020 vs Oxford United, FA Cup third round)
- Lowest home attendance: 22,727 (28 August 2019 vs Leicester City, EFL Cup second round)
- Average home league attendance: 45,036
- Biggest win: 4–1 (14 Jan 2020 v Rochdale, FA Cup third round replay); 3–0 (21 Jun 2020 v Sheffield United, PL round 30); 4–1 (1 Jul 2020 v Bournemouth, PL round 32)
- Biggest defeat: 0–5 (29 Sep 2019 v Leicester City, PL round 7); 0–5 (8 Jul 2020 v Manchester City, PL round 34)
Home colours	Away colours	Third colours

The 2019–20 season was Newcastle United's third season back in the Premier League following their promotion from the 2016–17 EFL Championship and their 25th year in the Premier League. This season Newcastle United participated in the Premier League, the EFL Cup and the FA Cup. The season was scheduled to cover the period of 1 July 2019 to 30 June 2020. However due to the COVID-19 pandemic, the season was temporally suspended from 13 March 2020 until 17 June 2020, and the season finished on 26 July 2020.

== Club ==
=== Coaching staff ===
The Newcastle United first team coaching staff for the 2019–20 season consists of the following:

==== First Team ====
Position	Staff
Head Coach	(England) Steve Bruce
Coach	(England) Steve Agnew
Coach	(England) Stephen Clemence
Coach	(England) Steve Harper
Head of Goalkeeping	(England) Simon Smith
Head of Medicine	(England) Paul Catterson
Fitness Coach	(Spain) Cristian Martínez
Head Physiotherapist	(England) Derek Wright
Physiotherapist	(England) Sean Beech
Physiotherapist	(England) Michael Harding
Physiotherapist	(Spain) Daniel Marti
Massage Therapist	(England) Wayne Farrage
Head of Recruitment	(England) Steve Nickson
Head of Performance Analysis	(England) Tom Coffield
Head of Sports Science	(England) Jamie Harley

== Squads ==
=== First-team squad ===
Squad No.	Name	Nationality	Position(s)	Date of birth (age)	Signed	Signed from
Goalkeepers
1	Martin Dúbravka	(Slovakia)	GK	15 January 1989 (aged 31)	2018	(Czech Republic) Sparta Prague
21	Rob Elliot	(Republic of Ireland) (Note: Elliot was born in Greenwich, England.)	GK	30 April 1986 (aged 34)	2011	(England) Charlton Athletic
26	Karl Darlow	(England)	GK	8 October 1990 (aged 29)	2014	(England) Nottingham Forest
Defenders
2	Ciaran Clark	(Republic of Ireland) (Note: Clark was born in Harrow, England.)	CB	26 September 1989 (aged 30)	2016	(England) Aston Villa
3	Paul Dummett	(Wales) (Note: Dummett was born in Newcastle upon Tyne, England.)	LB / CB	26 September 1991 (aged 28)	2010	(England) Newcastle United Academy
5	Fabian Schär	(Switzerland)	CB	20 December 1991 (aged 28)	2018	(Spain) Deportivo La Coruña
6	Jamaal Lascelles	(England)	CB	11 November 1993 (aged 26)	2014	(England) Nottingham Forest
15	Jetro Willems	(Netherlands)	LWB / LB	30 March 1994 (aged 26)	2019	(Germany) Eintracht Frankfurt (On Loan)
17	Emil Krafth	(Sweden)	RB / RWB	2 August 1994 (aged 25)	2019	(France) Amiens
18	Federico Fernández	(Argentina)	CB	21 February 1989 (aged 31)	2018	(Wales) Swansea City
19	Javier Manquillo	(Spain)	RB / RWB / LB	5 May 1994 (aged 26)	2017	(Spain) Atlético Madrid
20	Florian Lejeune	(France)	CB	20 May 1991 (aged 29)	2017	(Spain) Eibar
22	DeAndre Yedlin	(United States)	RWB / RB	9 July 1993 (aged 26)	2016	(England) Tottenham Hotspur
28	Danny Rose	(England)	LB / LWB	2 July 1990 (aged 29)	2020	(England) Tottenham Hotspur (On Loan)
Midfielders
8	Jonjo Shelvey	(England)	CM	27 February 1992 (aged 28)	2016	(Wales) Swansea City
10	Allan Saint-Maximin	(France)	LW / RW	12 March 1997 (aged 23)	2019	(France) Nice
11	Matt Ritchie	(Scotland) (Note: Ritchie was born in Gosport, England.)	RW / LW / LWB	10 September 1989 (aged 30)	2016	(England) AFC Bournemouth
14	Isaac Hayden	(England)	CM / DM	22 March 1995 (aged 25)	2016	(England) Arsenal
16	Rolando Aarons	(England) (Note: Aarons was born in Kingston, Jamaica.)	LW	16 November 1995 (aged 24)	2014	(England) Newcastle United Academy
23	Valentino Lazaro	(Austria)	RM	24 March 1996 (aged 24)	2020	(Italy) Inter Milan (On Loan)
24	Miguel Almirón	(Paraguay)	AM / RW / LW	10 February 1994 (aged 26)	2019	(United States) Atlanta United
30	Christian Atsu	(Ghana)	LW / RW	10 January 1992 (aged 28)	2017	(England) Chelsea
36	Sean Longstaff	(England)	CM / AM	30 September 1997 (aged 22)	2016	(England) Newcastle United Academy
42	Nabil Bentaleb	(Algeria) (Note: Bentaleb was born in Lille, France.)	CM	24 November 1994 (aged 25)	2020	(Germany) FC Schalke 04 (On Loan)
43	Matty Longstaff	(England)	CM	21 March 2000 (aged 20)	2019	(England) Newcastle United Academy
Forwards
7	Andy Carroll	(England)	ST	6 January 1989 (aged 31)	2019	(England) West Ham United
9	Joelinton	(Brazil)	ST	16 August 1996 (aged 23)	2019	(Germany) 1899 Hoffenheim
12	Dwight Gayle	(England)	ST	17 October 1989 (aged 30)	2016	(England) Crystal Palace
13	Yoshinori Muto	(Japan)	SS / ST	15 July 1992 (aged 27)	2018	(Germany) Mainz 05

== Transfers and loans ==
=== Transfers in ===
Date from	Position	Number	Nationality	Name	From	Fee	Team	Ref.
16 July 2019	—	—	(England)	Tom Midgley	(England) Manchester City	Free transfer	Academy	
23 July 2019	ST	9	(Brazil)	Joelinton	(Germany) 1899 Hoffenheim	£40,000,000	First team	
29 July 2019	CM	41	(United States)	Kyle Scott	(England) Chelsea	Free transfer	Under-23s	
29 July 2019	GK	—	(England)	Jake Turner	(England) Bolton Wanderers	Free transfer	Under-23s	
2 August 2019	RW	10	(France)	Allan Saint-Maximin	(France) OGC Nice	£20,000,000	First team	
8 August 2019	ST	7	(England)	Andy Carroll	(England) West Ham United	Free transfer	First team	
8 August 2019	RB	17	(Sweden)	Emil Krafth	(France) Amiens	£5,000,000	First team	
19 August 2019	DF	—	(Guadeloupe)	Ludwig Francillette	(France) US Quetigny	Free transfer	Under-23s	
17 January 2020	CM	—	(Scotland)	Reagan Thomson	(Scotland) Queen's Park	Undisclosed	Under-23s	
26 January 2020	CM	—	(England)	Stan Flaherty	(England) Arsenal	Undisclosed	Under-23s	
21 February 2020	ST	—	(England)	Kyle Crossley	(England) Morecambe	Undisclosed	Under-23s	

- Total spending: ▼£65,000,000

=== Transfers out ===
Date from	Position	Number	Nationality	Name	To	Fee	Team	Ref.
1 July 2019	RB	–	(England)	Max Allen	Free agent	Released	Academy	
1 July 2019	ST	–	(South Africa)	Tyrique Bartlett	Free agent	Released	Under-23s	
1 July 2019	ST	–	(England)	Thomas Cole	Free agent	Released	Academy	
1 July 2019	CM	10	(Senegal)	Mohamed Diamé	(Qatar) Al Ahli	Released	First team	
1 July 2019	GK	–	(Finland)	Otto Huuhtanen	Free agent	Released	Under-23s	
1 July 2019	DM	–	(England)	Sam Joyce	Free agent	Released	Academy	
1 July 2019	ST	–	(Spain)	Juanito	Free agent	Released	Under-23s	
1 July 2019	RW	–	(England)	Deese Kasinga	Free agent	Released	Academy	
1 July 2019	RW	37	(England)	Callum Roberts	(England) Blyth Spartans	Released	Under-23s	
1 July 2019	CB	–	(England)	Josef Yarney	(England) Chesterfield	Released	Under-23s	
4 July 2019	SS	17	(Spain)	Ayoze Pérez	(England) Leicester City	£30,000,000	First team	
15 July 2019	ST	21	(Spain)	Joselu	(Spain) Alavés	£1,700,000	First team	
7 September 2019	MF	–	(England)	Oliver Long	(England) Worthing	Free transfer	Under-23s	
31 January 2020	DM	4	(South Korea)	Ki Sung-yueng	(Spain) RCD Mallorca	Mutual consent	First team	

- Total incoming: ▲ ~ £31,700,000

=== Loans in ===
Date from	Position	Number	Nationality	Name	From	Expiry	Team	Ref.
2 August 2019	LB	15	(Netherlands)	Jetro Willems	(Germany) Eintracht Frankfurt	30 June 2020	First team	
21 January 2020	CM	42	(Algeria)	Nabil Bentaleb	(Germany) Schalke 04	30 June 2020	First team	
24 January 2020	RM	23	(Austria)	Valentino Lazaro	(Italy) Inter Milan	30 June 2020	First team	
30 January 2020	LB	28	(England)	Danny Rose	(England) Tottenham Hotspur	30 June 2020	First team	

=== Loans out ===
Date from	Position	Number	Nationality	Name	To	Loan Expiry	Team	Ref.
3 July 2019	CM	–	(Turkey)	Daniel Barlaser	(England) Rotherham United	30 June 2020	Under-23s	
16 July 2019	LB	–	(England)	Liam Gibson	(England) Grimsby Town	January 2020	Under-23s	
1 August 2019	GK	41	(England)	Freddie Woodman	(Wales) Swansea City	30 June 2020	First team	
2 August 2019	GK	29	(England)	Nathan Harker	(England) Blyth Spartans	January 2020	Under-23s	
8 August 2019	RW	7	(England)	Jacob Murphy	(England) Sheffield Wednesday	30 June 2020	First team	
16 August 2019	CF	—	(Denmark)	Elias Sørensen	(England) Carlisle United	20 December 2019	Under-23s	
16 August 2019	CB	53	(England)	Kelland Watts	(England) Stevenage	10 January 2020	Under-23s	
2 September 2019	LW	16	(England)	Rolando Aarons	(England) Wycombe Wanderers	13 January 2020	First team	
2 September 2019	LB	33	(Morocco)	Achraf Lazaar	(Italy) Cosenza	30 June 2020	First team	
28 January 2020	CB	49	(England)	Kelland Watts	(England) Mansfield Town	30 June 2020	Under-23s	
31 January 2020	LW	16	(England)	Rolando Aarons	(Scotland) Motherwell	30 June 2020	First team	

== Pre-season and friendlies ==
On 24 May 2019, Newcastle United announced four pre-season friendlies including the 2019 Premier League Asia Trophy against Wolverhampton Wanderers, West Ham United, Hibernian and AS Saint-Étienne. On 19 July 2019, Newcastle United announced another pre-season friendly against Preston North End which would take place on 27 July 2019.

17 July 2019 Asia Trophy Semi-finals	Newcastle United	0–4	Wolverhampton Wanderers	Nanjing
18:00 CST		Report	Jota 15', 40'; Gibbs-White 32'; Allan 85' (o.g.)	Stadium: Nanjing Olympic Sports Centre; Referee: Martin Atkinson (England)

20 July 2019 Asia Trophy 3rd place play-off	Newcastle United	1–0	West Ham United	Shanghai
17:00 CST	Muto 34'	Report		Stadium: Hongkou Stadium; Referee: Guan Xing (China)

27 July 2019 Friendly	Preston North End	2–1	Newcastle United	Preston
15:00 BST	Gallagher 60' (pen.), 71' (pen.)	Report	Shelvey 39'	Stadium: Deepdale; Attendance: 4,982; Referee: Michael Salisbury

30 July 2019 Friendly	Hibernian	1–3	Newcastle United	Edinburgh
19:45 BST	Mallan 10'	Report	Joelinton 16'; S. Longstaff 33'; Lascelles 73'	Stadium: Easter Road; Attendance: 12,557; Referee: John Beaton

3 August 2019 Friendly	Newcastle United	2–1	Saint-Étienne	Newcastle upon Tyne
15:00 BST	Joelinton 39'; M. Longstaff 73'	Report	Debuchy 85'	Stadium: St James' Park

== Competitions ==
=== Overall summary ===
Competition	Started round	Current position / round	Final position / round	First match	Last match
Premier League	Matchday 1	–	13th	10 August 2019	26 July 2020
EFL Cup	Second round	–	Second round	28 August 2019	
FA Cup	Third round	–	Quarter-finals	4 January 2020	28 June 2020

=== Overview ===
Competition	Record							
Competition	P	W	D	L	GF	GA	GD	Win %
Premier League	38	11	11	16	38	58	−20	28.95
EFL Cup	1	0	1	0	1	1	+0	0.00
FA Cup	6	3	2	1	11	8	+3	50.00
Total	45	14	14	17	50	66	−16	31.11

Source: Competitions

=== Premier League ===
==== League table ====
Pos	Team	Pld	W	D	L	GF	GA	GD	Pts
11	Southampton	38	15	7	16	51	60	−9	52
12	Everton	38	13	10	15	44	56	−12	49
13	Newcastle United	38	11	11	16	38	58	−20	44
14	Crystal Palace	38	11	10	17	31	50	−19	43
15	Brighton & Hove Albion	38	9	14	15	39	54	−15	41

Source: Premier League
Rules for classification: 1) Points; 2) Goal difference; 3) Goals scored; 4) If the champions, relegated teams or qualified teams for UEFA competitions cannot be determined by rules 1 to 3, rules 4.1 to 4.3 are applied – 4.1) Points gained in head to head record between such teams; 4.2) Away goals scored in head to head record between such teams; 4.3) Play-offs

==== Results summary ====
Overall								Home						Away					
Pld	W	D	L	GF	GA	GD	Pts	W	D	L	GF	GA	GD	W	D	L	GF	GA	GD
38	11	11	16	38	58	−20	44	6	8	5	20	21	−1	5	3	11	18	37	−19

Last updated: 26 July 2020.
Source: Premier League

==== Results by matchday ====
Round	1	2	3	4	5	6	7	8	9	10	11	12	13	14	15	16	17	18	19	20	21	22	23	24	25	26	27	28	29	30	31	32	33	34	35	36	37	38
Ground	H	A	A	H	A	H	A	H	A	H	A	H	A	H	A	H	A	H	A	H	H	A	H	A	H	A	A	H	A	H	H	A	H	A	A	H	A	H
Result	L	L	W	D	L	D	L	W	L	D	W	W	L	D	W	W	L	W	L	L	L	D	W	D	D	L	L	D	W	W	D	W	D	L	L	L	D	L
Position	14	18	19	14	18	17	19	16	18	17	15	13	14	14	11	11	11	9	10	11	13	13	12	14	12	12	14	14	13	13	13	13	12	13	13	13	13	13

Updated to match(es) played on 26 July 2020. Source: Premier League
A = Away; H = Home; W = Win; D = Draw; L = Loss

==== Matches ====
On 13 June 2019, the Premier League fixtures were announced.

11 August 2019 1	Newcastle United	0–1	Arsenal	Newcastle upon Tyne
14:00 BST	Almirón (yellow card) 18'	Report	Nelson (yellow card) 25'; Mkhitaryan (yellow card) 37'; Aubameyang 58'; Xhaka (yellow card) 81'	Stadium: St James' Park; Attendance: 47,635 (3,200 away); Referee: Martin Atkinson
Note: Live on Sky Sports

17 August 2019 2	Norwich City	3–1	Newcastle United	Norwich
15:00 BST	Pukki 32', 63', 75'; Aarons (yellow card) 37'	Report	Joelinton (yellow card) 44'; Dummett (yellow card) 85'; S. Longstaff (yellow card) 90+1'; Shelvey 90+3'	Stadium: Carrow Road; Attendance: 27,059 (2,000 away); Referee: Stuart Attwell

25 August 2019 3	Tottenham Hotspur	0–1	Newcastle United	Tottenham
16:30 BST	Winks (yellow card) 11'; Rose (yellow card) 66'	Report	Joelinton 27', (yellow card) 88'; Ritchie (yellow card) 47'	Stadium: Tottenham Hotspur Stadium; Attendance: 59,245 (3,000 away); Referee: Mike Dean
Note: Live on Sky Sports

31 August 2019 4	Newcastle United	1–1	Watford	Newcastle upon Tyne
15:00 BST	Hayden (yellow card) 31'; Schär 41'; Dummett (yellow card) 44'	Report	Hughes 2'; Doucouré (yellow card) 29'; Dawson (yellow card) 44'; Cathcart (yellow card) 55'	Stadium: St James' Park; Attendance: 44,157 (1,549 away); Referee: Graham Scott

14 September 2019 5	Liverpool	3–1	Newcastle United	Liverpool
12:30 BST	Mané 28', 40'; Salah 72'	Report	Willems 7'	Stadium: Anfield; Attendance: 51,430 (3,000 away); Referee: Andre Marriner
Note: Live on BT Sport

21 September 2019 6	Newcastle United	0–0	Brighton & Hove Albion	Newcastle upon Tyne
17:30 BST	Manquillo (yellow card) 44'; Atsu (yellow card) 79'	Report	Dunk (yellow card) 88'	Stadium: St James' Park; Attendance: 43,316 (1,254 away); Referee: Martin Atkinson
Note: Live on Sky Sports

29 September 2019 7	Leicester City	5–0	Newcastle United	Leicester
16:30 BST	Pereira 16'; Vardy (yellow card) 24' (goal) 54', 64'; Dummett 57' (o.g.); Ndidi 90+1'	Report	Hayden (red card) 43'; Schär (yellow card) 88'	Stadium: King Power Stadium; Attendance: 32,168 (2,650 away); Referee: Craig Pawson
Note: Live on Sky Sports

6 October 2019 8	Newcastle United	1–0	Manchester United	Newcastle upon Tyne
16:30 BST	Yedlin (yellow card) 15'; Schär (yellow card) 47'; Almirón (yellow card) 65'; M. Longstaff 72'	Report	Fred (yellow card) 3'; McTominay (yellow card) 30'; Rojo (yellow card) 78'	Stadium: St James' Park; Attendance: 51,198 (3,051 away); Referee: Mike Dean
Note: Live on Sky Sports

19 October 2019 9	Chelsea	1–0	Newcastle United	Fulham, London
15:00 BST	Alonso (yellow card) 23', (goal) 73'; Tomori (yellow card) 45+1'	Report	Clark (yellow card) 43'	Stadium: Stamford Bridge; Attendance: 40,513 (2,856 away); Referee: Andre Marriner

27 October 2019 10	Newcastle United	1–1	Wolverhampton Wanderers	Newcastle upon Tyne
14:00 GMT	Lascelles 37' (yellow card) 66'; Clark (yellow card) 55'; S. Longstaff (red card) 82'	Report	Saïss (yellow card) 69'; Jonny 73'; Neves (yellow card) 75'	Stadium: St James' Park; Attendance: 46,019 (3,162 away); Referee: Kevin Friend
Note: Live on Sky Sports

2 November 2019 11	West Ham United	2–3	Newcastle United	Stratford, London
15:00 GMT	Diop (yellow card) 14'; Cresswell (yellow card) 49'; Balbuena 73'; Snodgrass 90'	Report	Clark 16'; Fernández 22', (yellow card) 90+4'; Shelvey 51'	Stadium: Olympic Stadium; Attendance: 59,907 (3,000 away); Referee: Stuart Attwell

9 November 2019 12	Newcastle United	2–1	Bournemouth	Newcastle upon Tyne
15:00 GMT	Hayden (yellow card) 37'; Yedlin 42'; Clark 52'; Fernández (yellow card) 75'	Report	H. Wilson 14'	Stadium: St James' Park; Attendance: 44,424 (1,037 away); Referee: Martin Atkinson

25 November 2019 13	Aston Villa	2–0	Newcastle United	Birmingham
20:00 GMT	Hourihane 32'; El Ghazi 36'; Wesley (yellow card) 80'	Report	Fernández (yellow card) 35'	Stadium: Villa Park; Attendance: 41,821 (3,000 away); Referee: Lee Mason
Note: Live on Sky Sports

30 November 2019 14	Newcastle United	2–2	Manchester City	Newcastle upon Tyne
12:30 GMT	Willems 25'; Manquillo (yellow card) 73'; Shelvey 88'	Report	Sterling 22'; Gündoğan (yellow card) 24'; Fernandinho (yellow card) 53'; De Bruyne 82'	Stadium: St James' Park; Attendance: 49,937 (3,185 away); Referee: Chris Kavanagh
Note: Live on BT Sport

5 December 2019 15	Sheffield United	0–2	Newcastle United	Sheffield
19:30 GMT	Sharp (yellow card) 49'; Freeman (yellow card) 87'	Report	Saint-Maximin 15'; Shelvey 70'	Stadium: Bramall Lane; Attendance: 30,409 (2,865 away); Referee: Stuart Attwell
Note: Live on Amazon Prime Video

8 December 2019 16	Newcastle United	2–1	Southampton	Newcastle upon Tyne
14:00 GMT	Shelvey (yellow card) 48', (goal) 68'; Fernández 87'	Report	Ward-Prowse (yellow card) 44'; Ings 52'; Højbjerg (yellow card) 62'; Cédric (yellow card) 67'	Stadium: St James' Park; Attendance: 42,303 (1,053 away); Referee: David Coote

14 December 2019 17	Burnley	1–0	Newcastle United	Burnley
15:00 GMT	Wood 58'	Report	Joelinton (yellow card) 41'; Carroll (yellow card) 59'	Stadium: Turf Moor; Attendance: 19,798 (2,355 away); Referee: Tim Robinson

21 December 2019 18	Newcastle United	1–0	Crystal Palace	Newcastle upon Tyne
15:00 GMT	Almirón 83', (yellow card) 83'; Schär (yellow card) 87'	Report		Stadium: St James' Park; Attendance: 45,453 (1,536 away); Referee: Simon Hooper

26 December 2019 19	Manchester United	4–1	Newcastle United	Manchester
17:30 GMT	McTominay (yellow card) 1'; Martial 24', 51'; Pereira (yellow card) 35'; Greenwood 36'; Rashford 41'	Report	M. Longstaff 17'; Schär (yellow card) 38'; Yedlin (yellow card) 81'	Stadium: Old Trafford; Attendance: 73,206 (3,100 away); Referee: Kevin Friend
Note: Live on Amazon Prime Video

28 December 2019 20	Newcastle United	1–2	Everton	Newcastle upon Tyne
15:00 GMT	Joelinton (yellow card) 45+1'; Schär 56'; Hayden (yellow card) 80'	Report	Calvert-Lewin 13', 64', (yellow card) 90+3'; Davies (yellow card) 55'	Stadium: St James' Park; Attendance: 52,211 (3,171 away); Referee: Lee Mason

1 January 2020 21	Newcastle United	0–3	Leicester City	Newcastle upon Tyne
15:00 GMT	Fernández (yellow card) 31'	Report	Pérez 36'; Maddison 39'; Tielemans (yellow card) 59'; Choudhury 87'	Stadium: St James' Park; Attendance: 52,178 (2,910 away); Referee: Martin Atkinson
Note: Live on BT Sport

11 January 2020 22	Wolverhampton Wanderers	1–1	Newcastle United	Wolverhampton
15:00 GMT	Dendoncker 14'	Report	Almirón 7', (yellow card) 67'; Atsu (yellow card) 67'; M. Longstaff (yellow card) 87'	Stadium: Molineux Stadium; Attendance: 31,570 (2,967 away); Referee: Peter Bankes

18 January 2020 23	Newcastle United	1–0	Chelsea	Newcastle upon Tyne
17:30 GMT	Hayden (yellow card) 55', (goal) 90+4'	Report	Emerson (yellow card) 84'	Stadium: St James' Park; Attendance: 52,217 (3,139 away); Referee: Chris Kavanagh
Note: Live on Sky Sports

21 January 2020 24	Everton	2–2	Newcastle United	Liverpool
19:30 GMT	Kean 30'; Calvert-Lewin 54', (yellow card) 68'	Report	Clark (yellow card) 62'; Lejeune 90+4', 90+5'	Stadium: Goodison Park; Attendance: 38,822 (1,694 away); Referee: Simon Hooper

1 February 2020 25	Newcastle United	0–0	Norwich City	Newcastle upon Tyne
15:00 GMT	Yedlin (yellow card) 52'; Bentaleb (yellow card) 80'	Report	Cantwell (yellow card) 44'	Stadium: St James' Park; Attendance: 52,204 (1,600 away); Referee: Martin Atkinson

16 February 2020 26	Arsenal	4–0	Newcastle United	Holloway, London
16:30 GMT	Xhaka (yellow card) 9'; Aubameyang 54'; Pépé 57'; Saka (yellow card) 82'; Özil 90'; Lacazette 90+5'	Report		Stadium: Emirates Stadium; Attendance: 60,188 (3,000 away); Referee: Lee Mason
Note: Live on Sky Sports

22 February 2020 27	Crystal Palace	1–0	Newcastle United	Selhurst, London
15:00 GMT	McCarthy (yellow card) 14'; Van Aanholt 44'; McArthur (yellow card) 74'	Report	Bentaleb (yellow card) 21'; Almirón (yellow card) 32'; Lascelles (yellow card) 39'; Ritchie (yellow card) 83'; Joelinton (yellow card) 88'; Lazaro (red card) 90+5'; Longstaff (yellow card) 90+6'	Stadium: Selhurst Park; Attendance: 25,486 (2,800 away); Referee: Peter Bankes

29 February 2020 28	Newcastle United	0–0	Burnley	Newcastle upon Tyne
15:00 GMT	Rose (yellow card) 34'; Gayle (yellow card) 59'; Shelvey (yellow card) 70'; Manquillo (yellow card) 88'	Report	Bardsley (yellow card) 39'; Tarkowski (yellow card) 64'; Mee (yellow card) 90+3'	Stadium: St James' Park; Attendance: 52,219 (2,032 away); Referee: Andrew Madley

7 March 2020 29	Southampton	0–1	Newcastle United	Southampton
15:00 GMT	Djenepo (red card) 28'	Report	Manquillo (yellow card) 45+3'; Ritchie (yellow card) 56'; Saint-Maximin 79'; Joelinton (yellow card) 90'	Stadium: St Mary's Stadium; Attendance: 30,096 (3,051 away); Referee: Graham Scott

21 June 2020 30	Newcastle United	3–0	Sheffield United	Newcastle upon Tyne
14:00 BST	Joelinton (yellow card) 31', (goal) 78'; Saint-Maximin 55'; Ritchie 69'; Lascelles (yellow card) 70'	Report	Egan (yellow card) 31' (yellow-red card) 50'	Stadium: St James' Park; Attendance: 0 Referee: David Coote
Note: The match was postponed on 13 March due to concerns over the coronavirus pandemic, It was rescheduled to 21 June.

24 June 2020 31	Newcastle United	1–1	Aston Villa	Newcastle upon Tyne
18:00 BST	Lascelles (yellow card) 59'; Gayle 68'; Fernández (yellow card) 74'	Report	Douglas Luiz (yellow card) 45+1'; Elmohamady 83'; Hause (yellow card) 90'	Stadium: St James' Park; Attendance: 0 Referee: Chris Kavanagh
Note: The match was originally scheduled for Saturday 21 March but due to the FA Cup tie against Manchester City on the same day, the match was postponed until a later date. The rescheduling of the match was postponed on 13 March due to concerns over the coronavirus pandemic, it was rescheduled to 24 June.

1 July 2020 32	Bournemouth	1–4	Newcastle United	Bournemouth
18:00 BST	Kelly (yellow card) 23'; Aké (yellow card) 45+2'; Gosling 90+3'	Report	Gayle 5'; S. Longstaff 30'; Almirón 57'; Lazaro 77'	Stadium: Vitality Stadium; Attendance: 0 Referee: Kevin Friend
Note: The match was postponed on 13 March due to concerns over the coronavirus pandemic, It was rescheduled to 1 July.

5 July 2020 33	Newcastle United	2–2	West Ham United	Newcastle upon Tyne
14:00 BST	Almirón 17'; Gayle (yellow card) 37'; Shelvey 67'	Report	Antonio 4'; Souček 65'	Stadium: St James' Park; Attendance: 0 Referee: Craig Pawson
Note: Live on Sky Sports. The match was postponed on 3 April due to concerns over the coronavirus pandemic. It was rescheduled to 5 July.

8 July 2020 34	Manchester City	5–0	Newcastle United	Manchester
18:00 BST	Jesus 10'; Mahrez 21'; Fernández 58' (o.g.); Silva 65'; Sterling 90+1'	Report		Stadium: City of Manchester Stadium; Attendance: 0 Referee: Andrew Madley
Note: The match was postponed on 3 April due to concerns over the coronavirus pandemic. It was rescheduled to 8 July.

11 July 2020 35	Watford	2–1	Newcastle United	Watford
12:30 BST	Deeney 52' (pen.), 82' (pen.); Hughes (yellow card) 90'	Report	Gayle 23'; Lascelles (yellow card) 45+2'; Manquillo (yellow card) 63'; Fernández (yellow card) 77'; Schär (yellow card) 84'	Stadium: Vicarage Road; Attendance: 0 Referee: Craig Pawson
Note: The match was postponed on 3 April due to concerns over the coronavirus pandemic. It was rescheduled to 11 July.

15 July 2020 36	Newcastle United	1–3	Tottenham Hotspur	Newcastle upon Tyne
18:00 BST	Fernández (yellow card) 35'; Ritchie 56'; Shelvey (yellow card) 65'	Report	Son 27'; Alderweireld (yellow card) 31'; Kane 60', 90', (yellow card) 74'; Davies (yellow card) 85'	Stadium: St James' Park; Attendance: 0 Referee: David Coote
Note: The match was postponed on 3 April due to concerns over the coronavirus pandemic. It was rescheduled to 15 July.

20 July 2020 37	Brighton & Hove Albion	0–0	Newcastle United	Falmer
18:00 BST	Bissouma (yellow card) 23'; Groß (yellow card) 26'; Stephens (yellow card) 46'; Webster (yellow card) 87'	Report	Ritchie (yellow card) 31'; Rose (yellow card) 63'	Stadium: Falmer Stadium; Attendance: 0 Referee: Simon Hooper
Note: The match was postponed on 3 April due to concerns over the coronavirus pandemic. It was rescheduled to 20 July.

26 July 2020 38	Newcastle United	1–3	Liverpool	Newcastle upon Tyne
16:00 BST	Gayle 1'; Fernández (yellow card) 33'	Report	Van Dijk 38'; Origi 59'; Mané 89'	Stadium: St James' Park; Attendance: 0 Referee: Anthony Taylor
Note: The match was postponed on 3 April due to concerns over the coronavirus pandemic. It was rescheduled to 26 July.

=== FA Cup ===
The third round draw was made on 2 December 2019. The fourth round draw was made by Alex Scott and David O'Leary on Monday, 6 January.

4 January 2020 Third round	Rochdale	1–1	Newcastle United	Spotland
12:31 GMT	Rathbone (yellow card) 62'; Wilbraham 79'	Report	Almirón 17'	Stadium: Crown Oil Arena; Attendance: 8,593; Referee: David Coote
Note: Live on BT Sport

14 January 2020 Third round replay	Newcastle United	4–1	Rochdale	Newcastle upon Tyne
19:45 GMT	O'Connell 17' (o.g.); M. Longstaff 20'; Almirón 26'; Joelinton 82'; Allan (yellow card) 84'	Report	Ryan (yellow card) 75'; Williams 86'	Stadium: St James' Park; Attendance: 29,786; Referee: Graham Scott

25 January 2020 Fourth round	Newcastle United	0–0	Oxford United	Newcastle upon Tyne
15:00 GMT	Lascelles (yellow card) 11'	Report	Baptiste (yellow card) 64'; Rodriguez (yellow card) 75'; Sykes (yellow card) 85'	Stadium: St James' Park; Attendance: 52,221; Referee: Robert Jones

4 February 2020 Fourth round replay	Oxford United	2–3 (a.e.t.)	Newcastle United	Oxford
19:45 GMT	Sykes (yellow card) 45'; Kelly (yellow card) 77', (goal) 84'; Holland 90+4'	Report	S. Longstaff 15'; Joelinton 30'; Bentaleb (yellow card) 45'; Lejeune (yellow card) 95'; Saint-Maximin 116'	Stadium: Kassam Stadium; Attendance: 11,520; Referee: Peter Bankes

3 March 2020 Fifth round	West Bromwich Albion	2–3	Newcastle United	West Bromwich
20:00 GMT	Phillips 74'; Zohore 90+3'	Report	Almirón 33', 45+1'; Rose (yellow card) 43'; Lazaro 47'; Bentaleb (yellow card) 63'; Darlow (yellow card) 78'	Stadium: The Hawthorns; Attendance: 21,557; Referee: Anthony Taylor

28 June 2020 Quarter-finals	Newcastle United	0–2	Manchester City	Newcastle upon Tyne
18:00 BST	Carroll (yellow card) 61'; Joelinton (yellow card) 90+2'	Report	De Bruyne 37' (pen.); Sterling 68'	Stadium: St James' Park; Attendance: 0 Referee: Lee Mason
Note: Live on BBC One. The match was postponed due to the COVID-19 pandemic, and rescheduled to 28 June.

=== EFL Cup ===
The second round draw was made on 13 August 2019 following the conclusion of all but one first-round matches.

28 August 2019 Second round	Newcastle United	1–1 (2–4 p)	Leicester City	Newcastle upon Tyne
19:45 BST	Ritchie (yellow card) 37'; Muto 53'; Fernández (yellow card) 79'	Report	Söyüncü (yellow card) 19'; Maddison 34'; Choudhury (yellow card) 44'; Morgan (yellow card) 45+4'	Stadium: St James' Park; Attendance: 22,727; Referee: Tim Robinson
	Penalties
	Muto (penalty scored); Shelvey (penalty missed); Schär (penalty scored); Hayden (penalty missed)		(penalty scored) Fuchs; (penalty scored) Maddison; (penalty scored) Tielemans; (penalty missed) Barnes; (penalty scored) Vardy

== Statistics ==
=== Appearances and goals ===
Last updated on 26 July 2020.

No.	Pos	Nat	Player	Total		Premier League		EFL Cup		FA Cup	
No.	Pos	Nat	Player	Apps	Goals	Apps	Goals	Apps	Goals	Apps	Goals
Goalkeepers
1	GK	(Slovakia) SVK	Martin Dúbravka	39	0	38	0	0	0	1	0
26	GK	(England) ENG	Karl Darlow	6	0	0	0	1	0	5	0
Defenders
2	DF	(Republic of Ireland) IRL	Ciaran Clark	17	2	14	2	1	0	1+1	0
3	DF	(Wales) WAL	Paul Dummett	17	0	14+2	0	0+1	0	0	0
5	DF	(Switzerland) SUI	Fabian Schär	27	2	18+4	2	1	0	4	0
6	DF	(England) ENG	Jamaal Lascelles	29	1	24	1	0	0	5	0
17	DF	(Sweden) SWE	Emil Krafth	20	0	11+6	0	1	0	2	0
18	DF	(Argentina) ARG	Federico Fernández	35	2	29+3	2	1	0	2	0
19	DF	(Spain) ESP	Javier Manquillo	24	0	18+3	0	0+1	0	2	0
20	DF	(France) FRA	Florian Lejeune	8	2	4+2	2	0	0	2	0
22	DF	(United States) USA	DeAndre Yedlin	20	1	10+6	1	0	0	3+1	0
28	DF	(England) ENG	Danny Rose	13	0	10+1	0	0	0	2	0
49	DF	(England) ENG	Kelland Watts	1	0	0+1	0	0	0	0	0
Midfielders
8	MF	(England) ENG	Jonjo Shelvey	28	6	25+1	6	1	0	0+1	0
10	MF	(France) FRA	Allan Saint-Maximin	30	4	23+3	3	0	0	3+1	1
11	MF	(Scotland) SCO	Matt Ritchie	23	2	14+4	2	1	0	3+1	0
14	MF	(England) ENG	Isaac Hayden	35	1	26+3	1	1	0	3+2	0
23	MF	(Austria) AUT	Valentino Lazaro	15	2	4+9	1	0	0	1+1	1
24	MF	(Paraguay) PAR	Miguel Almirón	42	8	35+1	4	0	0	6	4
30	MF	(Ghana) GHA	Christian Atsu	24	0	6+13	0	0+1	0	2+2	0
36	MF	(England) ENG	Sean Longstaff	29	2	14+9	1	0	0	6	1
42	MF	(Algeria) ALG	Nabil Bentaleb	15	0	8+4	0	0	0	3	0
43	MF	(England) ENG	Matty Longstaff	15	3	6+3	2	1	0	3+2	1
Forwards
7	FW	(England) ENG	Andy Carroll	21	0	4+15	0	0	0	1+1	0
9	FW	(Brazil) BRA	Joelinton	44	4	32+6	2	0	0	5+1	2
12	FW	(England) ENG	Dwight Gayle	22	4	10+10	4	0	0	1+1	0
13	FW	(Japan) JPN	Yoshinori Mutō	10	1	2+6	0	1	1	1	0
50	FW	(England) ENG	Thomas Allan	1	0	0	0	0	0	0+1	0
Player(s) who left permanently but featured this season
4	MF	(South Korea) KOR	Ki Sung-yueng	4	0	1+2	0	0	0	0+1	0
15	DF	(Netherlands) NED	Jetro Willems	20	2	18+1	2	1	0	0	0

=== Goals ===
Last updated on 26 July 2020.

Place	Position	Number	Nation	Name	Premier League	EFL Cup	FA Cup	Total
1	MF	24	(Paraguay)	Miguel Almirón	4	0	4	8
2	MF	8	(England)	Jonjo Shelvey	6	0	0	6
3	MF	10	(France)	Allan Saint-Maximin	3	0	1	4
3	FW	9	(Brazil)	Joelinton	2	0	2	4
3	FW	12	(England)	Dwight Gayle	4	0	0	4
6	MF	43	(England)	Matty Longstaff	2	0	1	3
7	DF	2	(Republic of Ireland)	Ciaran Clark	2	0	0	2
7	MF	11	(Scotland)	Matt Ritchie	2	0	0	2
7	DF	15	(Netherlands)	Jetro Willems	2	0	0	2
7	DF	18	(Argentina)	Federico Fernández	2	0	0	2
7	DF	5	(Switzerland)	Fabian Schar	2	0	0	2
7	DF	20	(France)	Florian Lejeune	2	0	0	2
7	MF	36	(England)	Sean Longstaff	1	0	1	2
7	MF	23	(Austria)	Valentino Lazaro	1	0	1	2
15	FW	13	(Japan)	Yoshinori Muto	0	1	0	1
15	DF	6	(England)	Jamaal Lascelles	1	0	0	1
15	MF	14	(England)	Isaac Hayden	1	0	0	1
15	DF	22	(United States)	DeAndre Yedlin	1	0	0	1
Own Goals					0	0	1	1
TOTALS					38	1	11	50
