= Valentino Lazaro =

Austrian association football player

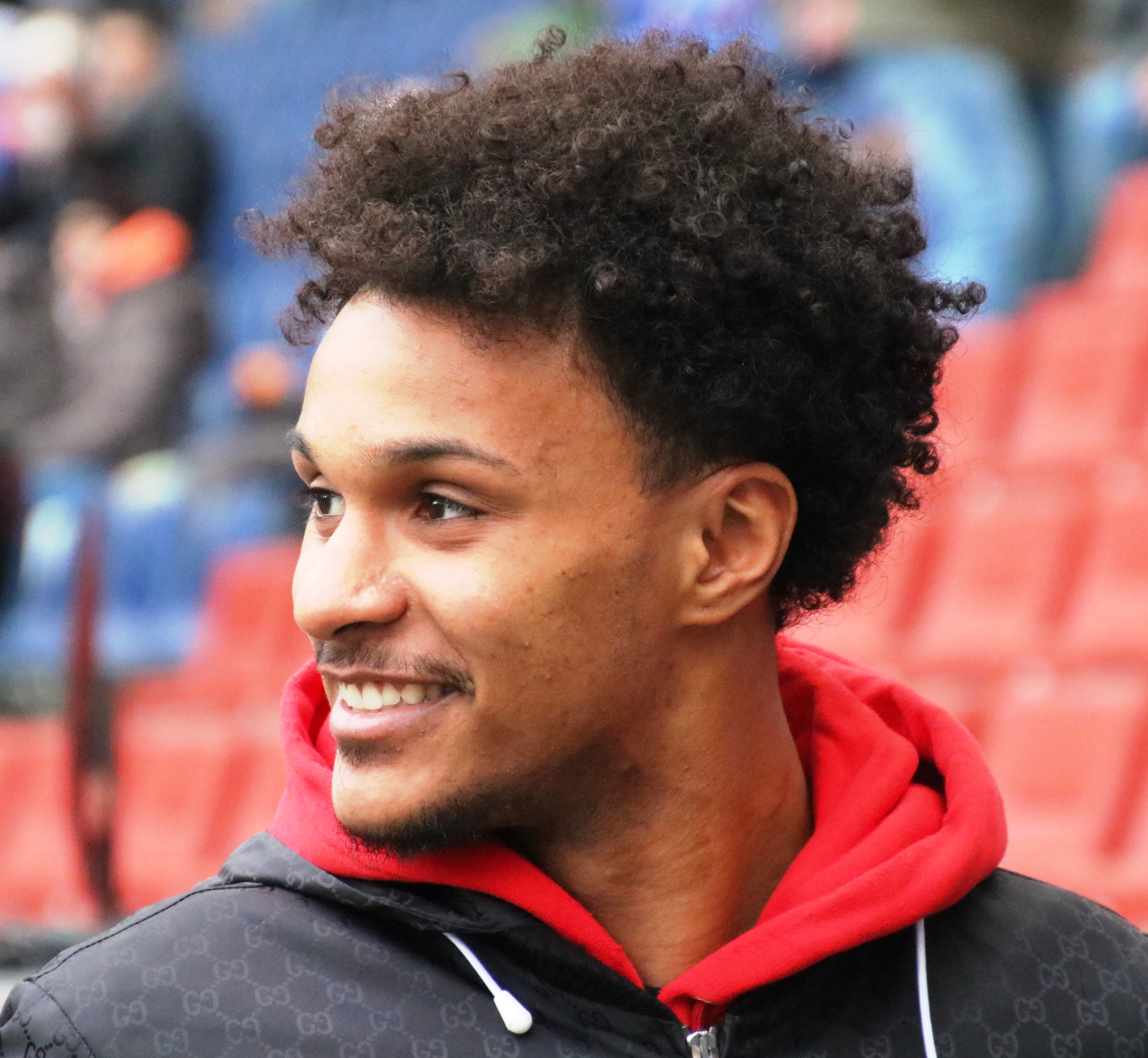
- Lazaro in 2018

Personal information
- Full name: Valentino Lando Lazaro
- Date of birth: 24 March 1996 (age 30)
- Place of birth: Graz, Styria, Austria
- Height: 1.80 m (5 ft 11 in)
- Positions: Right midfielder; full-back; right winger

Team information
- Current team: Al Ain
- Number: 19

Youth career
- 2002–2011: Grazer AK
- 2011–2012: Red Bull Salzburg

Senior career*
Years	Team	Apps	(Gls)
2012–2017	Red Bull Salzburg	87	(11)
2013	→ FC Liefering (loan)	3	(0)
2017–2019	Hertha BSC	57	(5)
2017	Hertha BSC II	1	(1)
2019–2023	Inter Milan	6	(0)
2020	→ Newcastle United (loan)	13	(1)
2020–2021	→ Borussia Mönchengladbach (loan)	22	(2)
2021–2022	→ Benfica (loan)	18	(0)
2022–2023	→ Torino (loan)	23	(0)
2023–2026	Torino	99	(0)
2026–	Al Ain	2	(0)

International career
2011	Austria U16	4	(0)
2012–2013	Austria U17	17	(0)
2014	Austria U18	2	(0)
2015–2016	Austria U21	6	(0)
2014–2022	Austria	36	(3)
- * Club domestic league appearances and goals as of 22 August 2026

Valentino Lando Lazaro (born 24 March 1996) is an Austrian professional footballer who plays as a right midfielder, full-back, or right winger for UAE Pro League club Al Ain.

== Club career ==
Lazaro was born in Graz, Austria, to an Angolan father and a Greek Cypriot mother. He made his full debut for Red Bull Salzburg on 3 November 2012 against Admira Wacker in the league. At 16 years and 224 days, he became the youngest player ever in the history of the Austrian Bundesliga.

Lazaro's loan deal from Red Bull Salzburg to Hertha BSC was made permanent in 2017, when he was signed on a long-term deal at the Bundesliga club. He scored his first goal for Hertha BSC in a 2–0 away win against Bayer Leverkusen on 10 February 2018.

=== Inter Milan ===
On 1 July 2019, Lazaro joined Inter Milan. He made his Serie A debut in Inter's 4–3 defeat of Sassuolo on 20 October 2019.

==== Loan to Newcastle United ====
On 24 January 2020, Lazaro joined Newcastle United on loan for the remainder of the 2019–20 season and was handed the number 23 shirt. He scored his first Newcastle goal in a 3–2 win over West Bromwich Albion to secure a spot in the quarter-finals of the FA Cup. On 1 July, Lazaro scored his first goal in the Premier League for the club in a 4–1 win over Bournemouth.

==== Loan to Borussia Mönchengladbach ====
After the end of the loan spell at Newcastle, on 20 August 2020, Lazaro joined Borussia Mönchengladbach on a season-long loan. On 8 November, he scored his first goal for the club with a scorpion kick in a 3–4 defeat against Bayer Leverkusen. The goal would be awarded as both the goal of the month for November and the Bundesliga goal of the season.

==== Loan to Benfica ====
On 31 August 2021, Lazaro joined Primeira Liga club Benfica on loan for the remainder of the 2021–22 season.

==== Loan to Torino and permanent signing ====
On 1 August 2022, Lazaro moved on loan to Torino, with an option to buy. On 19 August 2023, he joined Torino permanently from Inter.

== International career ==
Lazaro made his senior debut for the Austria national team 30 May 2014 in a 1–1 friendly draw against Iceland in Innsbruck, replacing Marko Arnautović for the last fifteen minutes. In May 2021, he was included in the 26-man Austria squad for the delayed UEFA Euro 2020.

== Career statistics ==
=== Club ===
As of match played 8 May 2026

Appearances and goals by club, season and competition
Club	Season	League			National cup		League cup		Europe		Total	
Club	Season	Division	Apps	Goals	Apps	Goals	Apps	Goals	Apps	Goals	Apps	Goals
Red Bull Salzburg	2012–13	Austrian Bundesliga	5	0	0	0	–		0	0	5	0
Red Bull Salzburg	2013–14	Austrian Bundesliga	11	2	1	0	–		1 (Note: Appearance(s) in UEFA Europa League)	0	13	2
Red Bull Salzburg	2014–15	Austrian Bundesliga	25	4	4	0	–		3 (Note: One appearance in UEFA Champions League, two appearances in UEFA Europa League)	0	32	4
Red Bull Salzburg	2015–16	Austrian Bundesliga	17	2	4	0	–		1	0	22	2
Red Bull Salzburg	2016–17	Austrian Bundesliga	29	3	5	2	–		12 (Note: Six appearances and two goals in UEFA Champions League, six appearances in UEFA Europa League)	2	46	7
Red Bull Salzburg	2017–18	Austrian Bundesliga	0	0	1	0	–		2 (Note: Appearances in UEFA Champions League)	0	3	0
Red Bull Salzburg	Total		87	11	15	2	–		19	2	121	15
FC Liefering (loan)	2013–14	Austrian First League	3	0	—		–		—		3	0
Hertha BSC	2017–18	Bundesliga	26	2	1	0	–		4	0	31	2
Hertha BSC	2018–19	Bundesliga	31	3	3	0	–		–		34	3
Hertha BSC	Total		57	5	4	0	–		4	0	65	5
Hertha BSC II	2017–18	Regionalliga Nordost	1	1	—		–		—		1	1
Inter Milan	2019–20	Serie A	6	0	1	0	–		4	0	11	0
Newcastle United (loan)	2019–20	Premier League	13	1	2	1	0	0	—		15	2
Borussia Mönchengladbach (loan)	2020–21	Bundesliga	22	2	1	0	–		5	0	28	2
Benfica (loan)	2021–22	Primeira Liga	18	0	3	0	2	0	6	0	29	0
Torino (loan)	2022–23	Serie A	23	0	2	0	–		–		25	0
Torino	2023–24	Serie A	35	0	1	0	–		–		36	0
Torino	2024–25	Serie A	33	0	2	0	–		–		35	0
Torino	2025–26	Serie A	31	0	4	0	–		–		35	0
Torino	Torino total		122	0	9	0	–		–		131	0
Career total			328	19	35	3	2	0	38	2	403	24

=== International ===
Appearances and goals by national team and year
National team	Year	Apps	Goals
Austria	2014	4	0
Austria	2015	0	0
Austria	2016	1	0
Austria	2017	6	0
Austria	2018	8	1
Austria	2019	9	2
Austria	2020	1	0
Austria	2021	3	0
Austria	2022	4	0
Total		36	3

Scores and results list Austria's goal tally first, score column indicates score after each Lazaro goal.

List of international goals scored by Valentino Lazaro
No.	Date	Venue	Opponent	Score	Result	Competition
1.	18 November 2018	Windsor Park, Belfast, Northern Ireland	Northern Ireland	2–1	2–1	2018–19 UEFA Nations League B
2.	10 June 2019	Toše Proeski Arena, Skopje, North Macedonia	North Macedonia	1–1	4–1	UEFA Euro 2020 qualification
3.	10 October 2019	Ernst-Happel-Stadion, Vienna, Austria	Israel	1–1	3–1	UEFA Euro 2020 qualification

== Honours ==
Red Bull Salzburg

- Austrian Bundesliga: 2011–12, 2013–14, 2014–15, 2015–16, 2016–17
- Austrian Cup: 2011–12, 2013–14, 2014–15, 2015–16, 2016–17

Individual

- Bundesliga Goal of the Month: November 2020
- Bundesliga Goal of the Year: 2020–21
