= Isaac Hayden =

Jamaican footballer (born 1995)

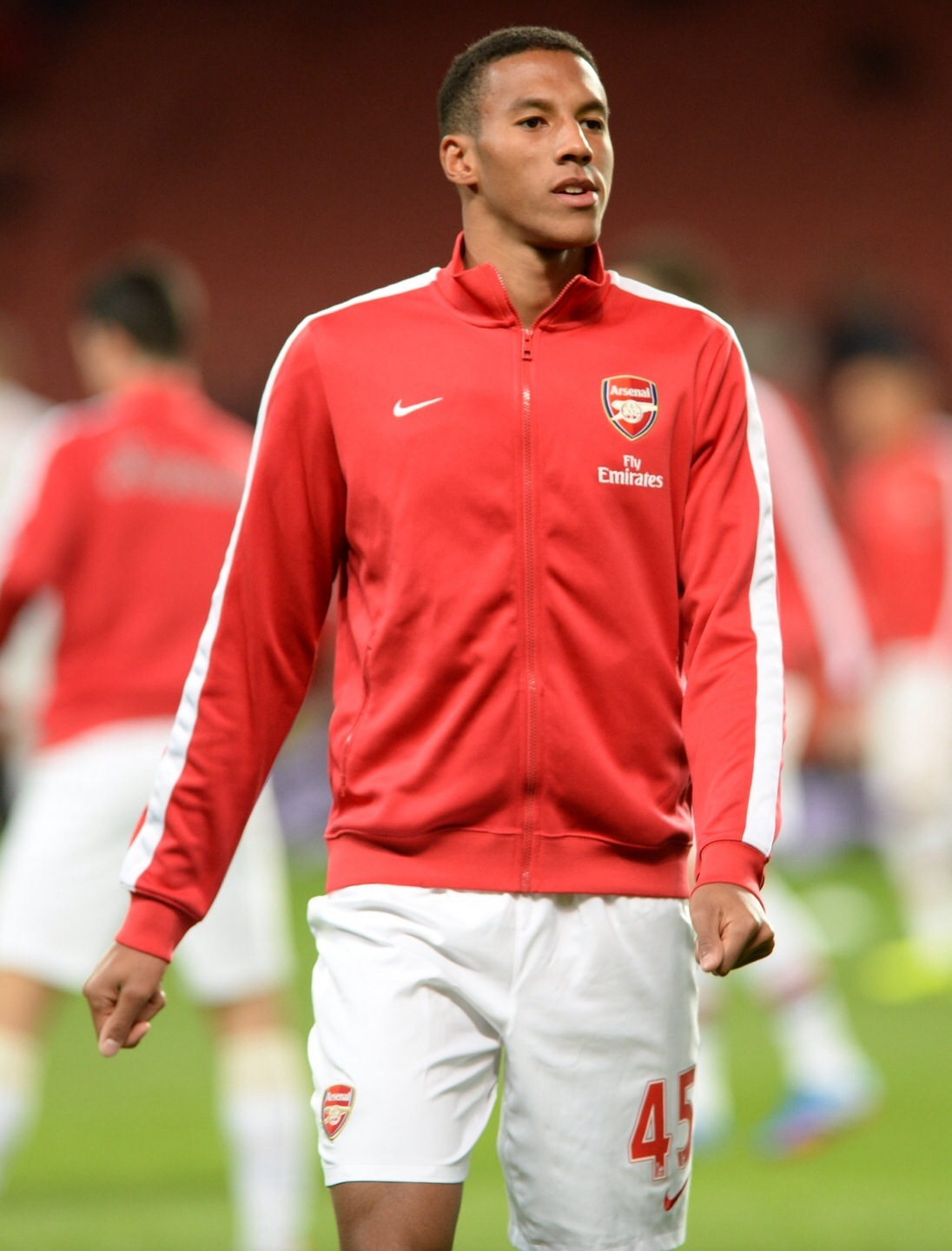
- Hayden with Arsenal in 2013

Personal information
- Full name: Isaac Scot Hayden
- Date of birth: 22 March 1995 (age 31)
- Place of birth: Chelmsford, England
- Height: 6 ft 2 in (1.87 m)
- Position: Defensive midfielder

Team information
- Current team: Leyton Orient
- Number: 14

Youth career
- Brentwood Boys FC
- 2004–2008: Southend United
- 2008–2013: Arsenal

Senior career*
Years	Team	Apps	(Gls)
2013–2016	Arsenal	0	(0)
2015–2016	→ Hull City (loan)	18	(1)
2016–2025	Newcastle United	151	(6)
2022–2023	→ Norwich City (loan)	14	(0)
2023–2024	→ Standard Liège (loan)	10	(0)
2024	→ Queens Park Rangers (loan)	17	(0)
2025	→ Portsmouth (loan)	17	(0)
2025–2026	Queens Park Rangers	26	(0)
2026–	Leyton Orient	11	(0)

International career^{‡}
2010–2011	England U16	2	(0)
2011–2012	England U17	9	(1)
2012	England U18	1	(0)
2013–2014	England U19	5	(0)
2014–2015	England U20	5	(0)
2016	England U21	3	(0)
2024–	Jamaica	17	(0)
- * Club domestic league appearances and goals as of 06:00, 25 October 2026 (UTC) ‡ National team caps and goals as of 21:54, 28 September 2026 (UTC)

Isaac Scot Hayden (born 22 March 1995) is a professional footballer who plays as a defensive midfielder for EFL League One club Leyton Orient, he is also the club captain. Born in England, he plays for the Jamaica national team.

Hayden is a product of Arsenal's youth academy, making his professional debut for the club in 2013. He then joined fellow Premier League side Newcastle United in 2016 on a five-year deal, making over 200 appearances for the club, spending time on loan at Norwich City, Standard Liège, Queens Park Rangers, and Portsmouth, before leaving Newcastle permanently in 2025.

Born in England, Hayden is a former English youth international, having played for his country in various youth ranks. Besides England, he was also eligible to represent Jamaica through his father. In November 2024, he switched his alliance and was called up to the Jamaican senior squad for the first time.

== Early life ==
Hayden was born in Chelmsford, Essex and played for Southend United until he was 13 years old, when he moved to London to join Arsenal's Academy.

== Club career ==
=== Arsenal ===
Hayden made his full debut for Arsenal in the third round of the League Cup in September 2013 against West Bromwich Albion. He started the away match playing in midfield and was substituted after 84 minutes for Kristoffer Olsson. Arsenal eventually won the game on penalties at The Hawthorns. On 23 September 2014, Hayden made a second appearance for Arsenal, playing at centre-back in another League Cup third-round game, a 2–1 home defeat against Southampton in September 2014.

==== Hull City (loan) ====
On 31 July 2015, Hayden joined Hull City on a season-long loan to gain first team experience. Hayden made his debut for the club on the opening day of the 2015–16 season in a 2–0 home win to Huddersfield Town. Hayden opened his account when he scored the final goal for Hull in the 6–0 defeat of Charlton Athletic on 16 January 2016.

=== Newcastle United ===
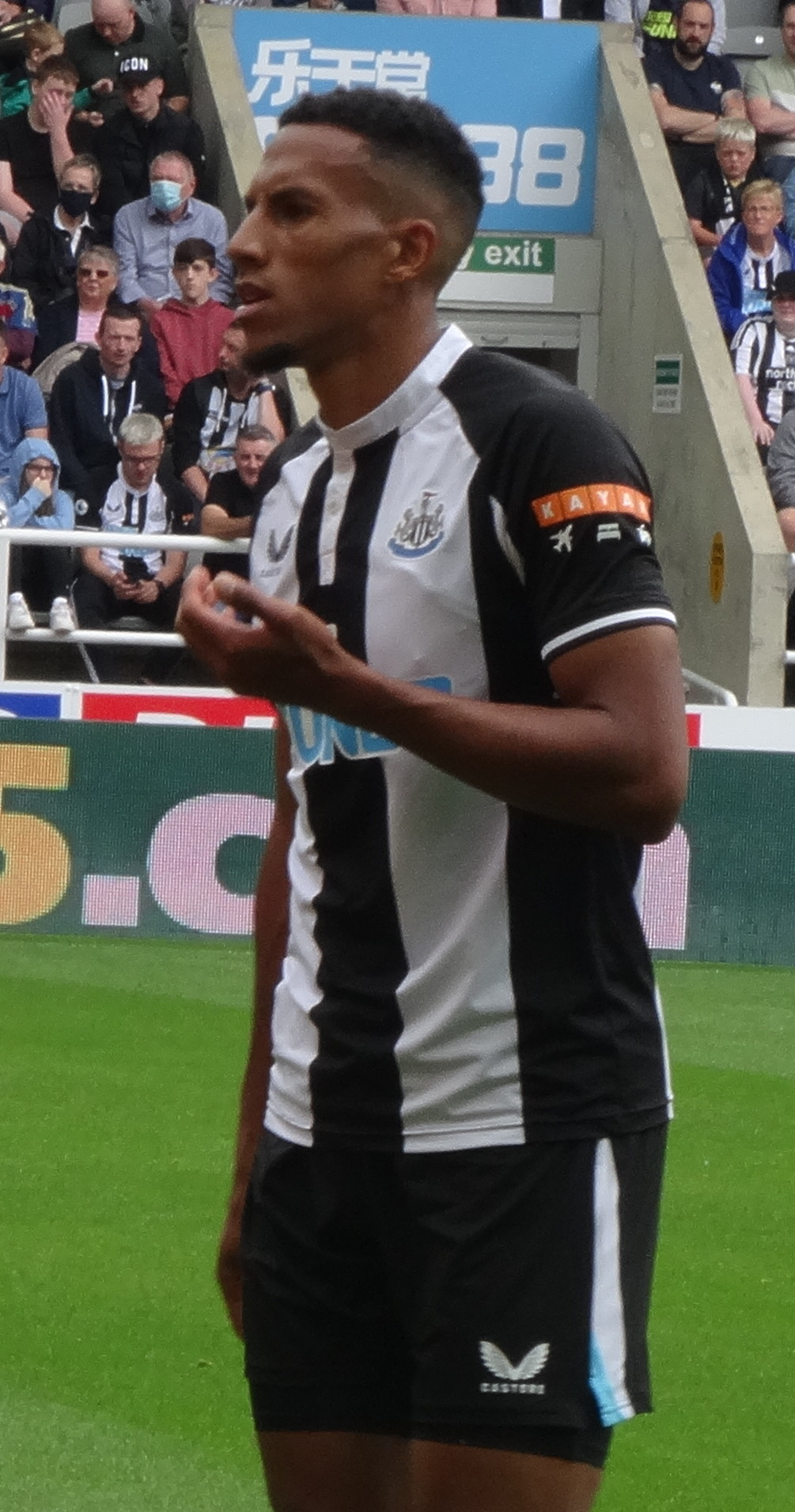
Hayden playing for Newcastle United in 2021

On 11 July 2016, Hayden signed for Premier League club Newcastle United on a five-year contract. Hayden scored his first goal for Newcastle in a 4–1 win over Reading on 17 August 2016. Hayden went on to win the 2016–17 Championship with Newcastle in May 2017.

Following promotion Hayden secured a place in the Newcastle team under the management of Rafael Benítez as a defensive midfielder. Following the departure of Benitez in 2019, Steve Bruce continued to play Hayden as a midfielder and at right back. Hayden scored the winning goal in a 2020 mid-season 1–0 win against Chelsea with a header in stoppage time.

After suffering a long-term injury in December 2021, Hayden was not named in the Newcastle United 25-man Premier League squad for the remainder of the 2021–22 season.

On 14 March 2022, Hayden was fined £19,000 by The Football Association after complaining on Twitter (now X) about referee David Coote's performance following Newcastle's 1–0 defeat against Chelsea.

On 26 May 2023, Newcastle manager Eddie Howe said Hayden had no future at the club and would be moved on.

On 2 August 2025, after a nine-year spell and 171 appearances for the club, Hayden left Newcastle permanently by mutual consent.

==== Loans out ====
On 7 June 2022, Hayden joined EFL Championship club Norwich City on a season-long loan.

On 5 September 2023, Hayden joined Belgian Pro League club Standard Liège on a season-long loan deal, but on 1 February 2024, he was recalled from his loan and was set to return to England and join Championship side Queens Park Rangers on a loan deal until the end of the season.

On 10 January 2025, Hayden joined Championship club Portsmouth on loan until the end of the season.

=== Return to Queens Park Rangers ===
On 25 August 2025, Hayden returned to Queens Park Rangers as a free agent.

On 5 May 2026, Queens Park Rangers announced that Hayden would leave the club when his contract expired on 30 June.

=== Leyton Orient ===
On 10 July 2026, following his release from Queens Park Rangers, Hayden joined EFL League One side Leyton Orient on a two-year deal.

== International career ==
Hayden was born in England to an English mother and Jamaican father, and was eligible to represent both national teams. Hayden represented England at the under-16, under-17, under-18, under-19, under-20 and under-21 levels of football.

Hayden declared his ambition to play for England at senior level in September 2019, but changed track in March 2021, when he personally contacted the Jamaican Football Federation to express his interest in playing for the Jamaica team. This came at a time when the Jamaican Football Federation announced its intention to target call-ups for a number of English players with Jamaican heritage, in order to improve the national team's chances of qualifying for the 2022 World Cup.

Hayden switched his alliance to Jamaica, and made his debut for the national team on 15 November 2024 in a CONCACAF Nations League game against the United States at the Independence Park. He substituted Greg Leigh at half-time, as USA won 1–0.

== Style of play ==
Then Arsenal manager Arsène Wenger has described Hayden as a player whose key assets are concentration, intelligence and strength. Equally comfortable at centre-back or in central midfield, whilst having also previously featured at right-back and as a playmaker.

== Personal life ==
Hayden previously had a wife named Lauren, with whom he has a daughter, Adriana, born in December 2017.

== Career statistics ==
=== Club ===
As of 22 March 2026

Appearances and goals by club, season and competition
Club	Season	League			National cup (Note: Includes FA Cup, Belgian Cup)		League cup (Note: Includes Football League/EFL Cup)		Other		Total	
Club	Season	Division	Apps	Goals	Apps	Goals	Apps	Goals	Apps	Goals	Apps	Goals
Arsenal	2013–14	Premier League	0	0	0	0	1	0	0	0	1	0
Arsenal	2014–15	Premier League	0	0	0	0	1	0	0	0	1	0
Arsenal	Total		0	0	0	0	2	0	—		2	0
Hull City (loan)	2015–16	Championship	18	1	2	0	4	0	0	0	24	1
Newcastle United	2016–17	Championship	33	2	3	0	2	0	—		38	2
Newcastle United	2017–18	Premier League	26	1	2	0	1	0	—		29	1
Newcastle United	2018–19	Premier League	25	1	3	0	0	0	—		28	1
Newcastle United	2019–20	Premier League	29	1	5	0	1	0	—		35	1
Newcastle United	2020–21	Premier League	24	0	1	0	2	1	—		27	1
Newcastle United	2021–22	Premier League	14	1	0	0	0	0	—		14	1
Newcastle United	2022–23	Premier League	0	0	0	0	0	0	—		0	0
Newcastle United	Total		151	6	14	0	6	1	—		171	7
Norwich City (loan)	2022–23	Championship	14	0	0	0	0	0	—		14	0
Standard Liège (loan)	2023–24	Belgian Pro League	10	0	1	0	—		—		11	0
Queens Park Rangers (loan)	2023–24	Championship	17	0	—		—		—		17	0
Portsmouth (loan)	2024–25	Championship	17	0	—		—		—		17	0
Queens Park Rangers	2025–26	Championship	29	0	1	0	—		—		30	0
Leyton Orient	2026–27	League One	7	0	0	0	3	0	1 (Note: Appearance in EFL Trophy)	0	11	0
Career total			263	7	18	0	15	1	1	0	297	8

=== International ===
As of match played 28 September 2026

Appearances and goals by national team and year
National team	Year	Apps	Goals
Jamaica	2024	2	0
Jamaica	2025	10	0
Jamaica	2026	5	0
Total		17	0

== Honours ==
Newcastle United

- EFL Championship: 2016–17
