= Ciaran Clark =

Association football player (born 1989)

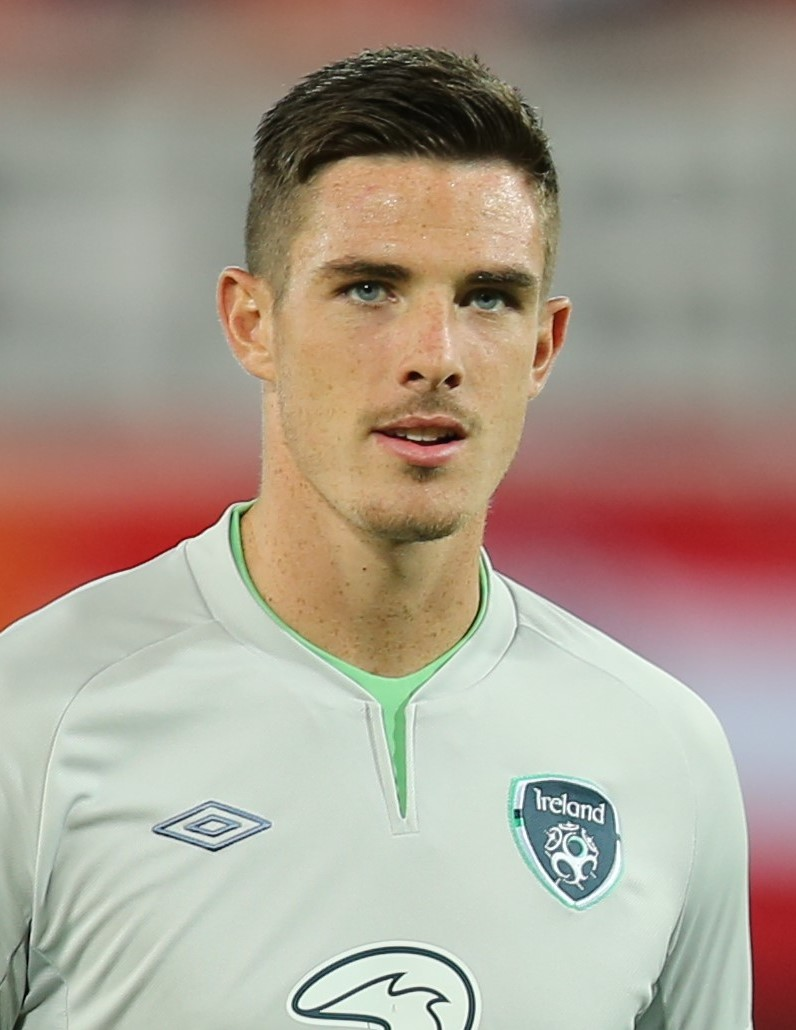
- Clark with the Republic of Ireland in 2013

Personal information
- Full name: Ciaran Clark
- Date of birth: 26 September 1989 (age 37)
- Place of birth: Harrow, England
- Height: 6 ft 1 in (1.85 m)
- Position: Centre-back

Youth career
- 2000–2009: Aston Villa

Senior career*
Years	Team	Apps	(Gls)
2009–2016	Aston Villa	134	(7)
2016–2023	Newcastle United	114	(11)
2022–2023	→ Sheffield United (loan)	10	(2)
2023–2024	Stoke City	3	(0)
Total		261	(20)

International career
2005–2006	England U17	6	(0)
2006–2007	England U18	2	(0)
2007–2008	England U19	9	(0)
2009–2010	England U20	2	(1)
2011–2021	Republic of Ireland	36	(2)
- * Club domestic league appearances and goals

Ciaran Clark (born 26 September 1989) is a former professional footballer who played as a centre-back.

A product of the Aston Villa Academy, Clark made his first-team debut for the club in August 2009. After making 159 appearances in total for the club across seven seasons, he moved to EFL Championship side Newcastle United in July 2016. In his first season with the club, he won the 2016–17 EFL Championship with Newcastle, earning promotion to the Premier League, and was awarded Newcastle Player of the Year.

He garnered 129 total appearances for Newcastle before moving on loan to Sheffield United for the 2022–23 season. Clark was released by Newcastle at the end of that season, ending his seven-year tenure with the Magpies. He then moved to Championship side Stoke City on a free transfer in October 2023, playing for the club sporadically. At the end of the 2023–24 season, Clark departed the club after unconvincing performances, quietly ending his playing career.

Born in England, Clark captained his home country at under-17, under-18, under-19 and under-20 level, but in October 2010 declared his ambition to play for the Republic of Ireland, the country of his parents' birth. He switched allegiances and was subsequently called up to the Irish squad in November 2010, making his full international debut in February 2011.

== Club career ==
=== Aston Villa ===
==== Early career ====
Clark was born in Harrow, London, and grew up in Sandy, Bedfordshire. He came through the Aston Villa youth academy after joining at the age of eleven, and captained the academy U18 team to the 2007–08 Premier Academy League—the academy's maiden league title. He was given a squad number for the 2008–09 season and named on the bench for Villa's 2008–09 UEFA Cup match away at CSKA Moscow, but remained an unused substitute. He captained the reserves to the Premier Reserve League South title and defeated PRL North winners Sunderland in the play-off final to win their first ever Reserve League trophy.

==== 2009–10 season ====
Clark was included in the squads for the pre-season friendlies and the 2009 Peace Cup. On 30 August 2009, he made his debut in a 2–0 win against Fulham. With Curtis Davies unavailable through injury, the 19-year-old was named in Villa's starting line-up, partnering Carlos Cuéllar in defence. He helped keep a clean sheet and nearly marked his debut with a goal but sent his header inches wide. Garth Crooks of the BBC named the youngster in his team of the week. Although the formidable partnership of new signings James Collins and Richard Dunne limited him to the bench, he was tipped to break into the first team on a regular basis within several years. In November 2009, he signed a contract extension until June 2012.

==== 2010–11 season ====
Clark started in the first two league games of the 2010–11 season: against West Ham United, partnering Richard Dunne and keeping a clean sheet; then against Newcastle United. Clark was also handed a start in Gérard Houllier's first match as new Villa manager, against Blackburn Rovers in the League Cup. He then started the match against local rivals Birmingham City in midfield and continued in the role against Fulham and Blackpool due to the club's injury crisis. On 27 November 2010, Clark scored his first two goals for the club in a 4–2 defeat against Arsenal at home. He scored a 91st-minute equaliser against Chelsea on 2 January 2011 to rescue a point. He also became the only player in Premier League history to be booked in six successive appearances within the same season.

==== 2011–12 season ====
Clark scored his first FA Cup goal for the club against Bristol Rovers on 29 January 2012, with a solo run, including stepovers and a left-footed strike curled into the bottom corner.

==== 2012–13 season ====
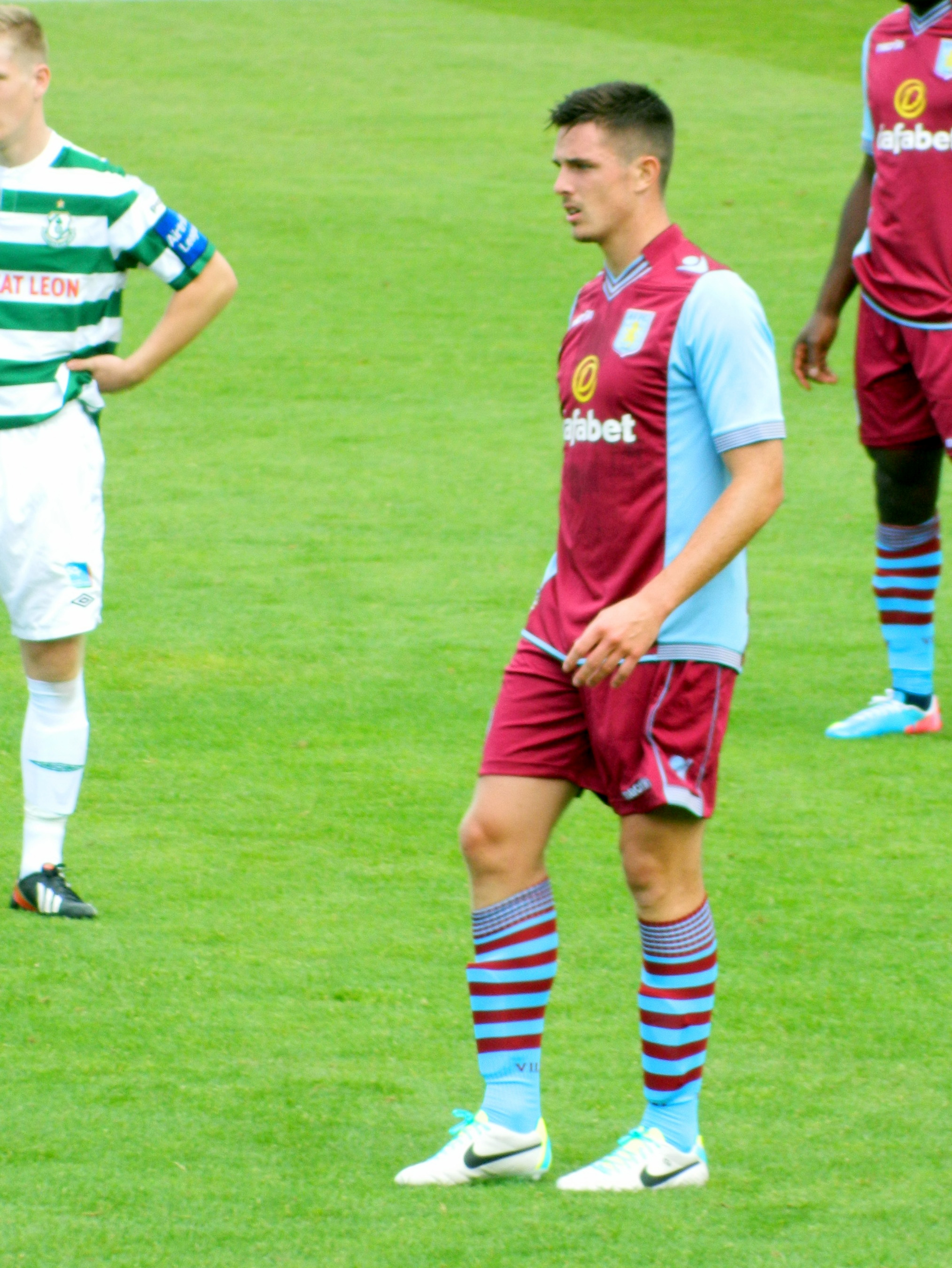
Clark playing for Aston Villa in 2013

On 25 August 2012, he was sent off against Everton for a professional foul on Nikica Jelavić. On 3 September 2012, he scored his first goal of the season in a 1–1 draw away to Newcastle United. On 8 December 2012, after captaining Villa's youth and reserve sides, Clark was handed the armband for the senior side for the first time in a 0–0 draw at home to Stoke, after Gabriel Agbonlahor who had started the match as captain was replaced by Darren Bent. Three days later, Clark followed up his initial role as captain by performing the role again, this time for the full 90 minutes, in a 4–1 victory in the League Cup away at Norwich which saw Villa qualify for the semi-finals.

==== 2013–14 season ====
Clark started Aston Villa's first game in their 3–1 away victory at Arsenal. After a dip in his form midway through Aston Villa's season, he was dropped to the bench as Lambert preferred a partnership between Ron Vlaar and fellow academy graduate, Nathan Baker. However, due to injury constantly plaguing Aston Villa's defence, along with consistently poor results, Clark still managed 28 appearances in a season that saw Villa finish 15th on 38 points. He accumulated nine yellow cards throughout the season.

In January 2014 during a training game Clark broke the right leg of his team-mate Libor Kozák. The mishandled injury virtually ended Kozák's Premier League career.

==== 2014–15 season ====
Aston Villa began the 2014–15 season in good form with Paul Lambert re-introducing Alan Hutton, forming a new look back four of Alan Hutton, Ron Vlaar, Philippe Senderos and Aly Cissokho. When an injury ruled Vlaar out, Nathan Baker came into the back four, with Clark remaining on the bench. After injuries to both Baker and Senderos, Clark was called on along with Jores Okore and formed a solid partnership. Clark scored his first goal of the season from a free-kick curled in by Ashley Westwood in a 2–1 home victory over Leicester City.

=== Newcastle United ===
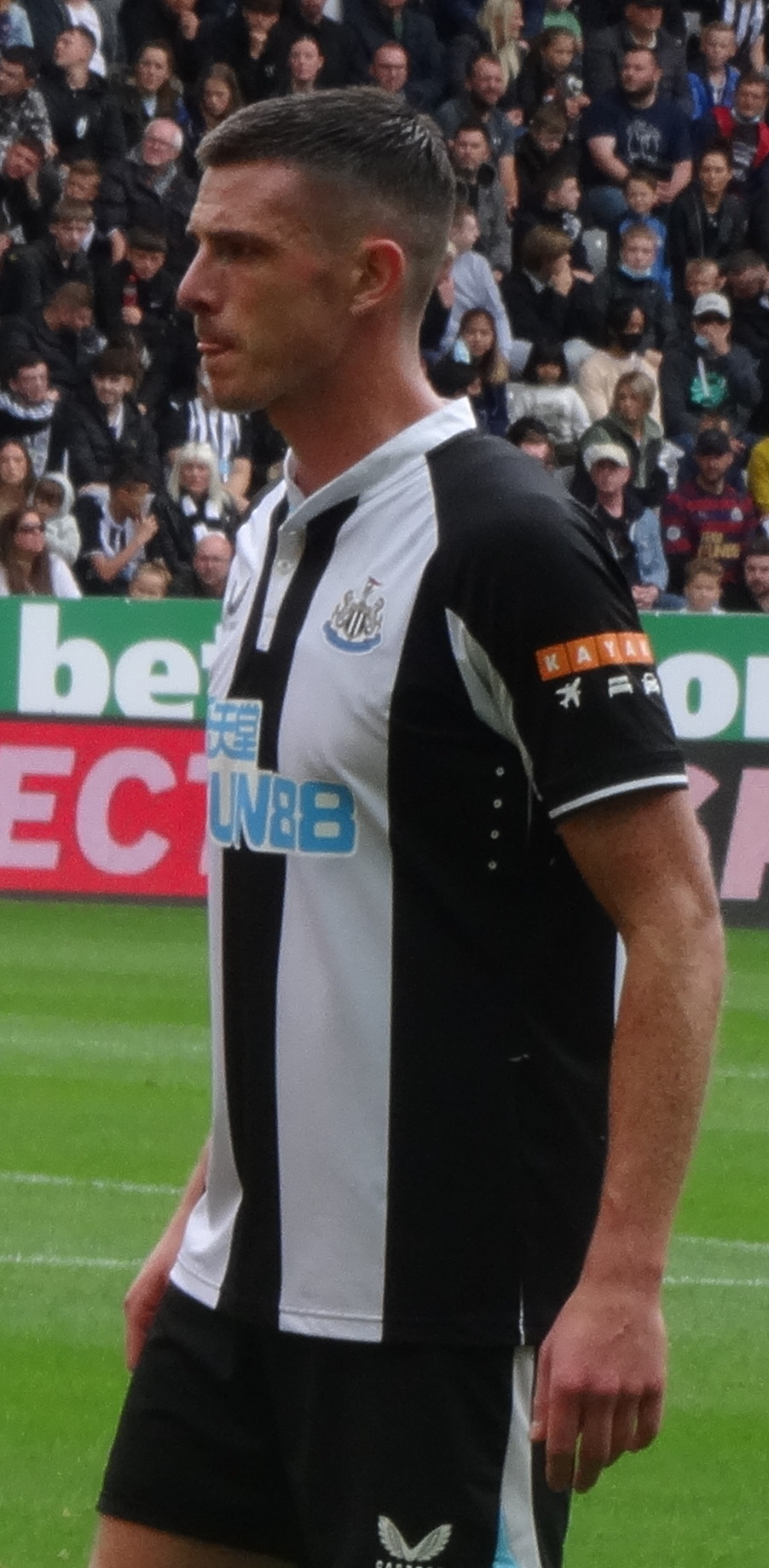
Clark with Newcastle United in 2021

On 3 August 2016, Newcastle announced that they had completed the signing of Clark from Aston Villa. Having established himself alongside club captain Jamaal Lascelles in central defence, he scored his first goal for the club in a 6–0 win against Queens Park Rangers on 13 September. He went on to add further goals against Brentford and Bristol City while also helping Newcastle concede the joint-lowest number of goals in the division as they returned to the Premier League at the first time of asking. He remained a regular starter for Newcastle in league games for the first half of the following season. However, he was left out of the side for most of the second half of the season with Florian Lejeune and Lascelles being preferred at central defence. In the 2018–19 season he only managed 8 appearances in the first team in the Premier League; however he still managed to score three goals, against Arsenal, Burnley, and Chelsea respectively.

On 16 December 2020, Clark scored Newcastle's second goal to equalise against Leeds United, a header in an eventual 5–2 loss. On 20 January 2021, Clark extended his contract with Newcastle, signing a new two-and-a-half-year contract.

On 30 November 2021, he was sent off after just nine minutes in a home game against Norwich City. In February 2022, Clark was one of the names excluded from Newcastle's 25-man squad for the remainder of the 2021–22 season.

On 16 June 2023, it was announced that Clark would be released by Newcastle at the expiration of his contract.

==== Loan to Sheffield United ====
On 13 July 2022, Clark joined EFL Championship side Sheffield United on loan for the 2022–23 season. He scored his first goal for the club in a 3–1 win over Coventry City on 26 December.

=== Stoke City ===
Following his release by Newcastle, Clark joined Championship club Stoke City on 10 October 2023 on a short-term deal until the end of the season. He made three appearances during his tenure with Stoke of which all came in the final three games under Alex Neil which all were lost. Clark was not selected by new manager Steven Schumacher, and he subsequently left the club at the end of the season.

== International career ==
=== England ===
Clark captained the England U19 team through qualification for the 2008 UEFA European Under-19 Championship, playing in five out of the six qualifiers and scoring a goal. He missed out on the tournament through an ankle injury sustained during training. After being promoted to the England U20s, he was appointed captain and scored in only his second match, in a friendly against Italy in March 2008.

=== Republic of Ireland ===
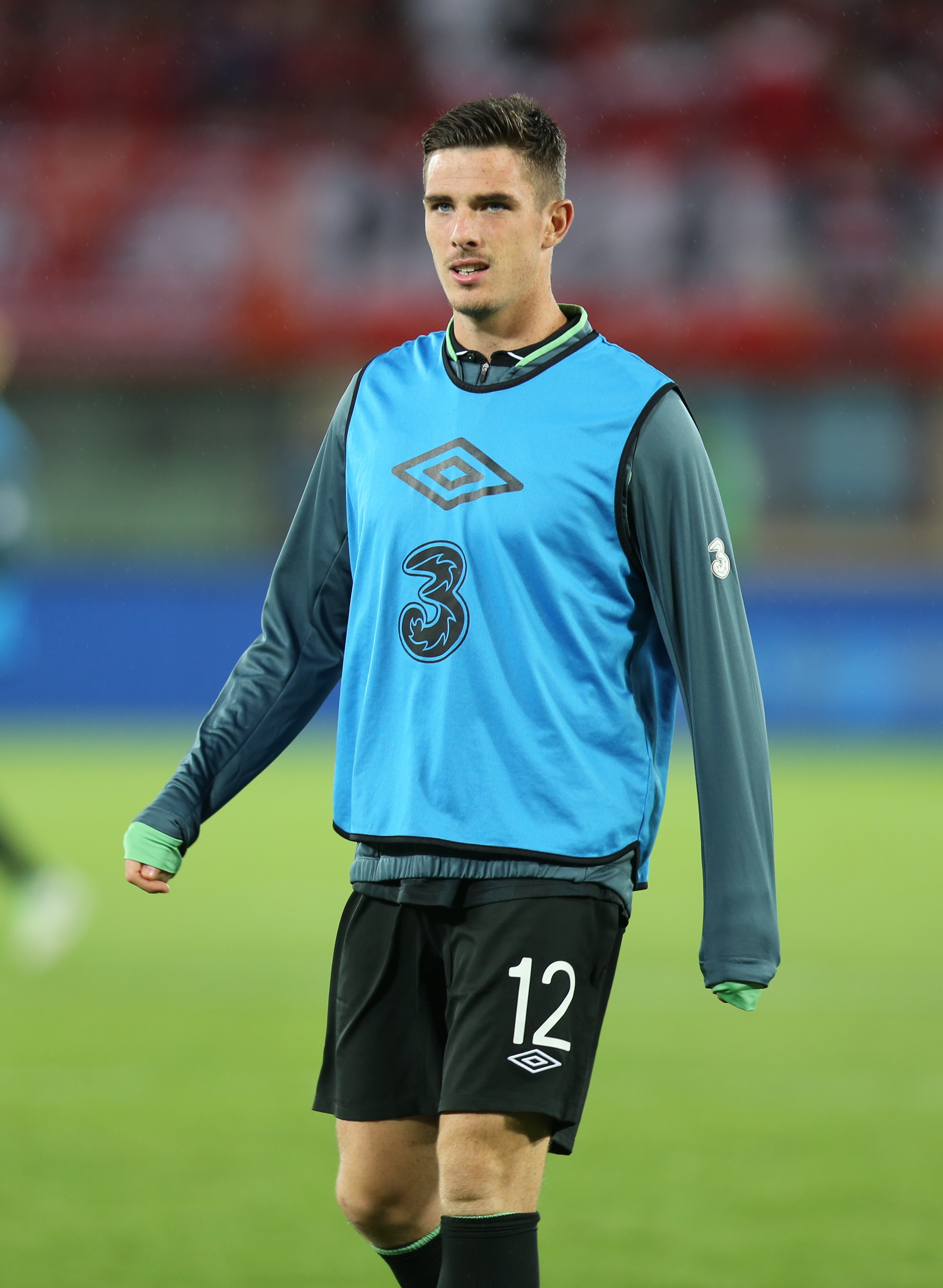
Clark warming up for the Republic of Ireland in 2013

In late September 2010, Football Association of Ireland (FAI) officials approached Clark about switching his allegiance. They sent scout and former Republic of Ireland under-21 manager, Don Givens, to watch him in the match against Blackburn. On 5 October 2010, it was reported that Clark had pledged his international future to the Irish national team as he qualified through his Irish parents. Club teammate Richard Dunne played a role in convincing him and had spoken to FAI scouts about his eligibility. On 12 November 2010, Clark was named in the Republic of Ireland squad for the friendly against Norway. He then made his debut on 8 February 2011 against Wales at the Aviva Stadium. On 6 February 2013, Clark scored his first goal for the Republic of Ireland, helping them to a 2–0 friendly victory against Poland.

In Republic of Ireland's opening match at UEFA Euro 2016 against Sweden, Clark deflected a ball from Zlatan Ibrahimović into his own net to level the scores. Wes Hoolahan had earlier given Ireland the lead but Clark's mishap saw them share the score as the match ended 1–1.

In November 2019, Clark said that he had previously considered leaving Newcastle United in order to maintain his place in the Irish international squad.

== Other ventures ==
=== Baller League ===
In March 2025, Clark was drafted to Trebol FC in the Baller League, an indoor six-a-side football competition hosted in Germany and the United Kingdom. The competition involves former footballers and managers, as well as influencers and celebrities.

== Career statistics ==
=== Club ===
Appearances and goals by club, season and competition
Club	Season	League			FA Cup		League Cup		Europe		Total	
Club	Season	Division	Apps	Goals	Apps	Goals	Apps	Goals	Apps	Goals	Apps	Goals
Aston Villa	2008–09	Premier League	0	0	0	0	0	0	0	0	0	0
Aston Villa	2009–10	Premier League	1	0	0	0	0	0	0	0	1	0
Aston Villa	2010–11	Premier League	19	3	3	1	3	0	0	0	25	4
Aston Villa	2011–12	Premier League	15	1	2	1	1	0	—		18	2
Aston Villa	2012–13	Premier League	29	1	2	0	4	0	—		35	1
Aston Villa	2013–14	Premier League	27	0	1	0	0	0	—		28	0
Aston Villa	2014–15	Premier League	25	1	4	0	0	0	—		29	1
Aston Villa	2015–16	Premier League	18	1	3	1	2	0	—		23	2
Aston Villa	Total		134	7	15	3	10	0	0	0	159	10
Newcastle United	2016–17	Championship	34	3	0	0	2	0	—		36	3
Newcastle United	2017–18	Premier League	20	2	2	0	0	0	—		22	2
Newcastle United	2018–19	Premier League	11	3	2	0	1	0	—		14	3
Newcastle United	2019–20	Premier League	14	2	2	0	1	0	—		17	2
Newcastle United	2020–21	Premier League	22	1	1	0	3	0	—		26	1
Newcastle United	2021–22	Premier League	13	0	0	0	1	0	—		14	0
Newcastle United	Total		114	11	7	0	8	0	—		129	11
Sheffield United (loan)	2022–23	Championship	10	2	0	0	1	0	—		11	2
Stoke City	2023–24	Championship	3	0	0	0	0	0	—		3	0
Career total			261	20	22	3	19	0	0	0	302	23

=== International ===
Appearances and goals by national team and year
National team	Year	Apps	Goals
Republic of Ireland	2011	2	0
Republic of Ireland	2012	1	0
Republic of Ireland	2013	6	1
Republic of Ireland	2014	2	0
Republic of Ireland	2015	4	0
Republic of Ireland	2016	9	1
Republic of Ireland	2017	6	0
Republic of Ireland	2018	2	0
Republic of Ireland	2019	2	0
Republic of Ireland	2021	2	0
Total		36	2

Republic of Ireland score listed first, score column indicates score after each Clark goal.

List of international goals scored by Ciaran Clark
No.	Date	Venue	Cap	Opponent	Score	Result	Competition	Ref.
1	6 February 2013	Aviva Stadium, Dublin, Ireland	4	Poland	1–0	2–0	Friendly	
2	25 March 2016	Aviva Stadium, Dublin, Ireland	16	Switzerland	1–0	1–0	Friendly	

== Honours ==
Newcastle United

- EFL Championship: 2016–17

Republic of Ireland

- Nations Cup: 2011

Individual

- Newcastle United Player of the Year: 2016–17

== See also ==
- List of Republic of Ireland international footballers born outside the Republic of Ireland
