= Rob Elliot =

English footballer & manager (born 1986)

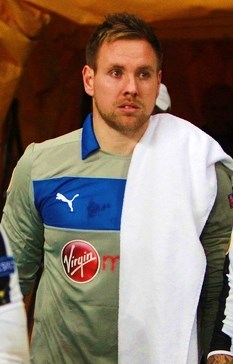
- Elliot with Newcastle United in 2013

Personal information
- Full name: Robert Elliot
- Date of birth: 30 April 1986 (age 40)
- Place of birth: Greenwich, London, England
- Height: 1.90 m (6 ft 3 in)
- Position: Goalkeeper

Team information
- Current team: Carlisle United (head coach)

Youth career
- Erith Town
- Charlton Athletic

Senior career*
Years	Team	Apps	(Gls)
2004–2011	Charlton Athletic	96	(0)
2004	→ Bishop's Stortford (loan)	6	(0)
2005	→ Notts County (loan)	4	(0)
2005–2006	→ Accrington Stanley (loan)	23	(0)
2006–2007	→ Accrington Stanley (loan)	7	(0)
2011–2020	Newcastle United	55	(0)
2021–2022	Watford	0	(0)
2022–2024	Gateshead	0	(0)
Total		191	(0)

International career
2004	Republic of Ireland U19	1	(0)
2014–2016	Republic of Ireland	4	(0)

Managerial career
- 2023–2024: Gateshead
- 2024–2025: Crawley Town
- 2026: Gateshead
- 2026–: Carlisle United
- * Club domestic league appearances and goals

Robert Elliot (born 30 April 1986) is a professional football manager and former player who played as a goalkeeper. He is the current head coach of National League club Carlisle United.

Elliot began his career with Erith Town, before joining Charlton Athletic's academy side. Whilst at Charlton, he was sent out on loan to Bishop's Stortford and Notts County, and also spent two loan spells at Accrington Stanley, where he was nicknamed "The Dilsh". He would then go on to be Charlton's first choice goalkeeper for a number of seasons, until he joined Newcastle United on transfer deadline day in the summer of 2011. Signed mainly as a back-up to Tim Krul, he featured for the club sporadically, but became first choice in the 2015–16 season after Krul suffered a season-ending injury.

Through the origins of his father's family, Elliot became eligible to represent the Republic of Ireland national football team, and was first called up in 2013, making his debut the following year. Elliot retired from the first team in 2017.

In June 2020, Elliot was released by Newcastle United after nine years. In January 2021, Elliot signed for Watford until the end of the 2020–21 season. In June 2021, Elliot signed a new 2-year contract with Watford. Following this, he joined National League side Gateshead as the club's Technical Director whilst also being registered as a player. He became Gateshead's first-team manager in 2023.

== Club career ==
=== Charlton Athletic ===
Born in Greenwich, London, Elliot began his career with non-League side Erith Town before moving to Charlton Athletic, the team he had supported as a child, when he was 17. After becoming a professional player with the Addicks in 2004, he was sent out on loan twice during the 2004–05 season; first to Bishop's Stortford and then Notts County, where he made his Football League debut.

The following season, Elliot spent most of the season on loan at the Conference National club Accrington Stanley, replacing fellow Charlton goalkeeper Darren Randolph who had been on loan at Stanley earlier in the year. He was part of the Accrington Stanley team which won promotion to the Football League as runaway champions, saving a vital penalty from Woking's Justin Richards in the match which guaranteed them promotion. He joined Stanley again on loan during the 2006–07 season, but failed to displace Ian Dunbavin as the club's first choice goalkeeper. He was voted the best keeper of the past decade for Accrington Stanley in 2010 by numerous key figures for the club, including manager John Coleman.

Back at Charlton, Elliot was considered to be behind Nicky Weaver and Darren Randolph for most of the 2007–08 season. After Randolph moved to Bury on loan Elliot was promoted to second choice. He made an unexpected debut for Charlton on 5 April 2008 after Weaver had been sent off in a match against Plymouth Argyle. He made his first start for Charlton in a League Cup defeat to Yeovil Town in August 2008. During the 2008–09 season, he displaced Weaver and established himself as the club's first choice goalkeeper. A string of impressive performances contributing to a record breaking start to a season for Charlton in the 2009–10 season led to him signing a contract extension committing him to the club until 2012. In August 2011, Newcastle United made an offer of £100,000 which was rejected by Charlton.

=== Newcastle United ===
On 30 August 2011, Elliot signed for Newcastle United on a five-year contract, becoming their seventh summer signing. He then stated his desire to become first choice 'keeper. He made his Newcastle debut on 20 September against Nottingham Forest in the Football League Cup.

At the start of the 2012–13 season, Elliot changed his squad number from 35 to 21, which was previously worn by Fraser Forster. He made his second Newcastle appearance in the Europa League on 20 September against Marítimo. His third Newcastle appearance, and second of the season, came in a third round League Cup tie away at Manchester United. On 24 February 2013, and following an injury to Tim Krul, Elliot made his first Premier League appearance for the Magpies, starting against Southampton in a 4–2 victory. During the match, after conceding a goal in the third minute, he then assisted a Papiss Cissé wonder goal in the first half. On 12 May, Elliot was sent off against Queens Park Rangers, following a second yellow card.

Elliot started the 2015–16 season as third choice 'keeper behind Krul and Karl Darlow. However, with Krul suffering a season-ending injury and Darlow still recovering from an ankle knock, Elliot was handed his first appearance of the season on 18 October at home to Norwich City, helping Newcastle to a 6–2 win, their first win of the campaign. Before the game, it was revealed that Elliot had signed a 'new, long-term contract' back in January 2014. Elliot continued his run in the team, keeping successive clean sheets against Stoke City and AFC Bournemouth, the latter performance earning him the man-of-the-match award in a 1–0 win. This was the first time Newcastle had kept two clean sheets in a row in two years and their first away win in ten months.

On 29 March 2016, whilst on international duty, Elliot sustained an anterior cruciate ligament injury, and was ruled out of action for six months, ending his hopes of a place on the Republic of Ireland squad for UEFA Euro 2016.

On 7 September 2016 he extended his contract with the Magpies until 2020. Elliot returned to the Newcastle squad in December, but by then, Darlow had usurped him as the first choice 'keeper. For the next two months, he was not involved in the first team, but did make two appearances for the reserves. From February 2017 onwards, Elliot would be on the bench until 24 April, when Darlow himself was benched due to squad rotation. Elliot's first appearance of the season came in a 4–1 win over Preston North End. On 28 April, he was named captain against Cardiff City, keeping a clean sheet as Newcastle won 2–0. On 7 May, he again kept a clean sheet, as Newcastle beat Barnsley 3–0, edging out Brighton & Hove Albion by a point to win the Championship.

On 11 August 2017, Elliot's shirt number was changed from 21 to 1 in the 2017–18 season squad number announcement, replacing Tim Krul, who had been linked with a permanent move to Brighton & Hove Albion.

Elliot never made an appearance in the 2018–19 season, having lost his place in the side to Martin Dúbravka.

=== Watford ===
On 28 January 2021, Elliot signed for Watford on a contract until the end of the 2020–21 season. In June 2021, Elliot signed a new two-year contract with Watford. Elliot made his debut for Watford in a League Cup tie against Stoke City on 21 September 2021, his first competitive game since 2017. On 28 June 2022, Elliot was released on a free transfer following Watford's relegation to the Championship at the end of the 2021–22 season having only made one competitive appearance for the club.

=== Gateshead ===
On 11 August 2022, Elliot joined Gateshead as Technical Director. He was also registered as a first-team player.

== International career ==
Elliot, who was born in England, is eligible for the Republic of Ireland through his father's family from Cork, and represented Ireland at under-19 level. On 5 October 2013, he received his first call-up to the Republic of Ireland senior squad as a replacement for the injured Darren Randolph for the games against Germany and Kazakhstan. Elliot won his first international senior cap for the Republic of Ireland on 25 May 2014, in a 2–1 home loss to Turkey. He pulled out of the Republic of Ireland senior squad in November 2017, citing family reasons.

== Managerial career ==
=== Gateshead ===
Following the departure of manager Mike Williamson to Milton Keynes Dons, Elliot was appointed caretaker manager of Gateshead in October 2023. After leading Gateshead to a 6th-place finish in the National League, Gateshead were barred from competing in the play-offs after failing to secure a "10-year security of tenure" of their stadium. He also led Gateshead to the 2024 FA Trophy final, defeating Solihull Moors on penalties to lift the trophy for the first time in the club's history.

On 20 June 2024, Elliot was appointed Gateshead manager on a permanent basis. Following an unbeaten start to the season, he was named National League Manager of the Month for August 2024.

=== Crawley Town ===
On 1 October 2024, Elliot was named as manager of Crawley Town on a two-and-a-half-year contract. However, after a disastrous spell which left the club 12 points adrift of safety, he was sacked by the club on 19 March 2025.

=== Gateshead ===
In early January 2026, with the club bottom of the National League, Elliot took over as the new manager of Gateshead. Despite the club being 11 points from safety in mid-February, Elliot managed to turn around Gateshead's poor run of form and had them out of the relegation zone in March. On 11 April 2026, Gateshead's 1–0 away win against Aldershot Town meant the club had avoided relegation with two games to go. After the game, Elliot told the local press: "The mentality of the team is amazing. Even after today, they've come off the pitch disappointed that they haven't played as well as they felt they should and that speaks volumes. Getting over the line is huge, to get it done with two games to play is outstanding and the lads deserve to breathe and look forward to next year." It was described by Daniel Storey in The i Paper as "the greatest escape in English football history". On 27 May 2026, Elliot left the club after budgets for the upcoming season could not be agreed upon.

=== Carlisle United ===
On 28 May 2026, Elliot was appointed head coach of National League club Carlisle United.

== Career statistics ==
=== Club ===
Appearances and goals by club, season and competition
Club	Season	League			FA Cup		League Cup		Europe (Note: Appearances in UEFA Europa League)		Other (Note: Appearances in Football League Trophy)		Total	
Club	Season	Division	Apps	Goals	Apps	Goals	Apps	Goals	Apps	Goals	Apps	Goals	Apps	Goals
Charlton Athletic	2004–05	Premier League	0	0	0	0	0	0	—		—		0	0
Charlton Athletic	2005–06	Premier League	0	0	0	0	0	0	—		—		0	0
Charlton Athletic	2006–07	Premier League	0	0	—		—		—		—		0	0
Charlton Athletic	2007–08	Championship	1	0	0	0	0	0	—		—		1	0
Charlton Athletic	2008–09	Championship	23	0	2	0	1	0	—		—		26	0
Charlton Athletic	2009–10	League One	33	0	0	0	1	0	—		1	0	35	0
Charlton Athletic	2010–11	League One	35	0	5	0	0	0	—		3	0	43	0
Charlton Athletic	2011–12	League One	4	0	0	0	0	0	—		—		4	0
Charlton Athletic	Total		96	0	7	0	2	0	—		4	0	109	0
Bishop's Stortford (loan)	2004–05	Conference South	6	0	0	0	0	0	—		—		6	0
Notts County (loan)	2004–05	League Two	4	0	0	0	0	0	—		—		4	0
Accrington Stanley (loan)	2005–06	Conference National	23	0	—		—		—		—		23	0
Accrington Stanley (loan)	2006–07	League Two	7	0	0	0	1	0	—		3	0	11	0
Accrington Stanley (loan)	Total		30	0	0	0	1	0	—		3	0	34	0
Newcastle United	2011–12	Premier League	0	0	0	0	1	0			—		1	0
Newcastle United	2012–13	Premier League	10	0	1	0	1	0	5	0	—		17	0
Newcastle United	2013–14	Premier League	2	0	1	0	1	0	—		—		4	0
Newcastle United	2014–15	Premier League	3	0	0	0	2	0	—		—		5	0
Newcastle United	2015–16	Premier League	21	0	1	0	0	0	—		—		21	0
Newcastle United	2016–17	Championship	3	0	0	0	0	0	—		—		3	0
Newcastle United	2017–18	Premier League	16	0	0	0	0	0	—		—		16	0
Newcastle United	2018–19	Premier League	0	0	0	0	0	0	—		—		0	0
Newcastle United	2019–20	Premier League	0	0	0	0	0	0	—		—		0	0
Newcastle United	Total		55	0	3	0	5	0	5	0	—		68	0
Watford	2020–21	Championship	0	0	0	0	0	0	—		—		0	0
Watford	2021–22	Premier League	0	0	0	0	1	0	—		—		1	0
Watford	Total		0	0	0	0	1	0	—		—		1	0
Gateshead	2022–23	National League	0	0	0	0	—		—		—		0	0
Gateshead	2023–24	National League	0	0	0	0	—		—		—		0	0
Gateshead	Total		0	0	0	0	—		—		—		0	0
Career total			191	0	10	0	9	0	5	0	7	0	222	0

=== International ===
Appearances and goals by national team and year
National team	Year	Apps	Goals
Republic of Ireland	2013	0	0
Republic of Ireland	2014	3	0
Republic of Ireland	2016	1	0
Republic of Ireland	2017	0	0
Total		4	0

== Managerial statistics ==
As of match played 21 November 2026

Managerial record by team and tenure
Team	From	To	Record					Ref.
Team	From	To	P	W	D	L	Win %	Ref.
Gateshead	17 October 2023	1 October 2024	49	26	9	14	53.1	
Crawley Town	1 October 2024	19 March 2025	33	6	8	19	18.2	
Gateshead	2 January 2026	27 May 2026	22	9	4	9	40.9	
Carlisle United	28 May 2026	Present	20	11	5	4	55.0	
Total			124	52	26	46	41.9	

== Honours ==
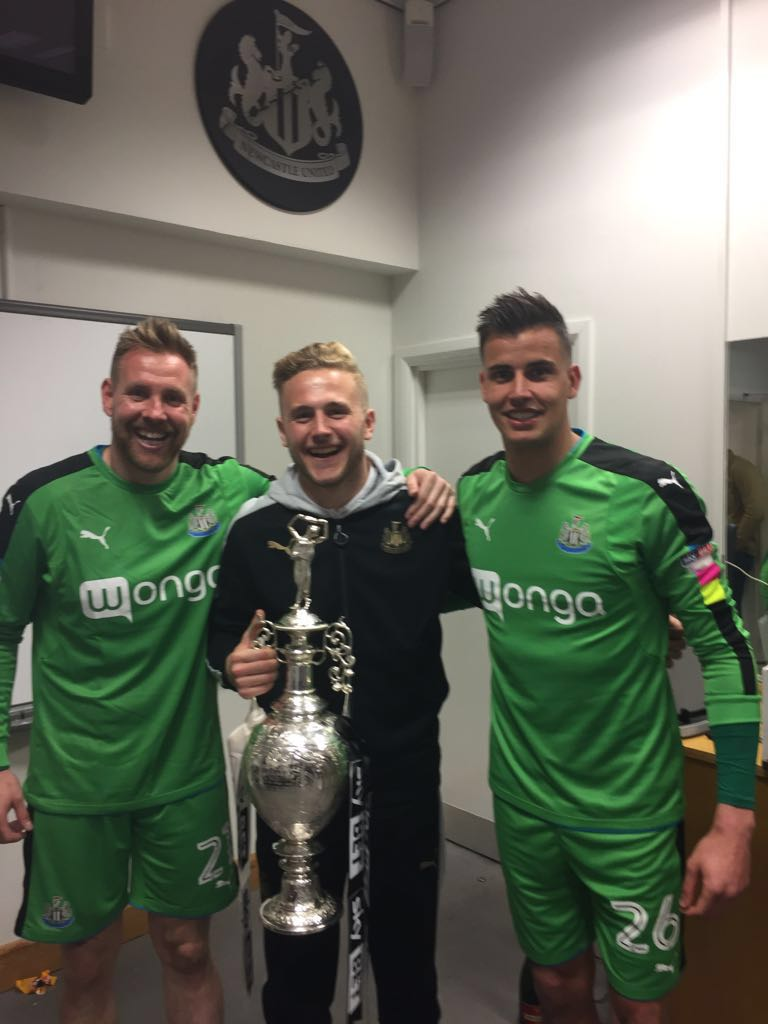
Rob Elliot (left) with fellow Newcastle goalkeeper Karl Darlow (right) and Paul Woolston (middle) celebrating with the EFL Championship trophy

Accrington Stanley

- Conference National: 2005–06

Individual

- Newcastle United Player of the Year: 2015–16

=== As a manager ===
Gateshead

- FA Trophy: 2023–24

Individual

- National League Manager of the Month: August 2024, March 2026

== See also ==
- List of Republic of Ireland international footballers born outside the Republic of Ireland
