= Jamaal Lascelles =

English footballer

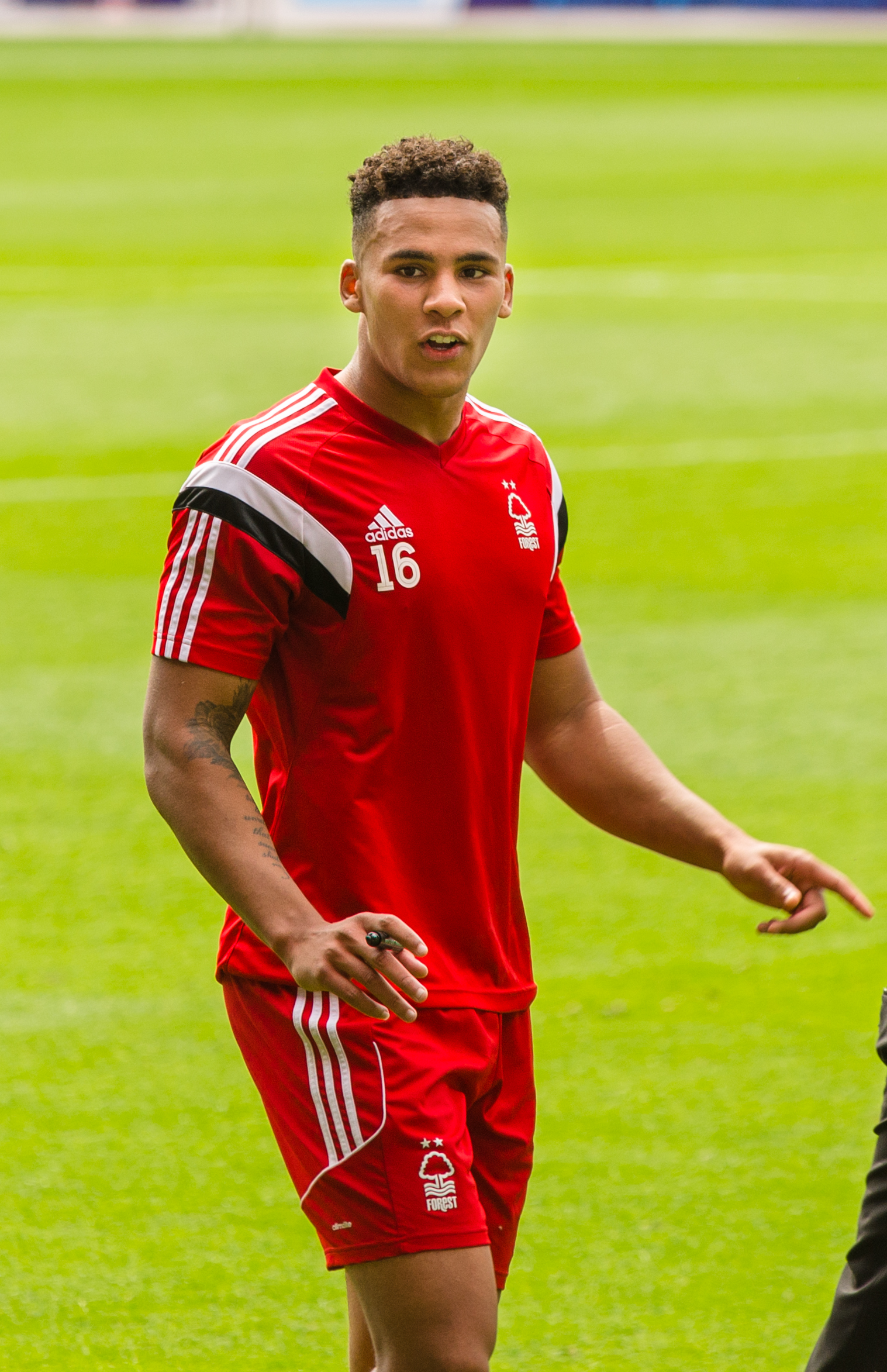
- Lascelles warming up for Nottingham Forest in 2014

Personal information
- Full name: Jamaal Lascelles
- Date of birth: 11 November 1993 (age 33)
- Place of birth: Derby, England
- Height: 6 ft 2 in (1.88 m)
- Position: Centre-back

Youth career
- –2011: Nottingham Forest

Senior career*
Years	Team	Apps	(Gls)
2011–2014	Nottingham Forest	32	(2)
2012	→ Stevenage (loan)	7	(1)
2014–2026	Newcastle United	220	(13)
2014–2015	→ Nottingham Forest (loan)	26	(1)
2026	Leicester City	9	(0)

International career
2011	England U18	1	(0)
2011–2012	England U19	8	(0)
2013	England U20	1	(0)
2014	England U21	2	(0)
- * Club domestic league appearances and goals as of 23:30, 21 April 2026 (UTC)

Jamaal Lascelles (/dʒəˈmɑːl ləˈsɛls/ jə-MAHL lə-SELSS; born 11 November 1993) is an English professional footballer who plays as a centre-back.

He previously played for Nottingham Forest, where he was developed through their youth academy, and signed professionally with the team in 2011. During his time with the club, he had one brief loan spell to Stevenage for the second half of the 2011–12 season. In August 2014, he was signed by Newcastle United, and was immediately sent back on loan to Nottingham Forest. Appointed Newcastle captain in 2016, he won the EFL Championship in 2017 and the EFL Cup in 2025 with the club, before joining Leicester City permanently in February 2026.

== Club career ==
=== Nottingham Forest ===
Lascelles was born in Derby, Derbyshire. His father, Tim Lascelles, was a professional basketball player who played for Derby Trailblazers. He began his career at Nottingham Forest, progressing through the club's youth system. In January 2011, the club rejected a £5 million offer from Arsenal for him. He signed his first professional contract in March 2011. Lascelles made his first-team debut on 31 January 2012, starting in a 2–0 defeat to Burnley.

==== Loan to Stevenage ====
In March 2012, Lascelles joined League One club Stevenage, on loan until the end of the 2011–12 season. He made his debut for Stevenage on 13 March 2012, coming on as a 69th-minute substitute in a 1–0 home win over Oldham Athletic, playing in the right-back position. He made his first starting appearance in Stevenage's 6–0 away victory at Yeovil Town on 14 April 2012, scoring the club's fourth goal with a header from Luke Freeman's cross. Lascelles also provided the assist for Patrick Agyemang's goal in the same game. He remained as a first-team regular from then onwards, playing the remaining four games of the regular season as Stevenage secured a League One play-off spot. Lascelles also played in both play-off matches, as Stevenage lost 1–0 on aggregate to Sheffield United. He made nine appearances during his two-month loan spell, scoring once.

==== Return to Nottingham Forest ====
On 7 August 2012, Lascelles signed a new four-year contract with Nottingham Forest. He made a total of three appearances in all competitions in the 2012–13 season.

Lascelles broke into the starting line-up in the 2013–14 season, forming a central defensive partnership with Jack Hobbs and making a total of 29 league appearances. On 22 January 2014, Everton were fined £45,000 by the FA over an "unauthorised approach" to Lascelles in 2010 while he was still a youth player at Nottingham Forest. Lascelles was warned as to his future conduct. On 18 March, Lascelles extended his contract in a new four-and-a-half-year deal. A reported £4 million bid from Queens Park Rangers was rejected by the club in July.

=== Newcastle United ===
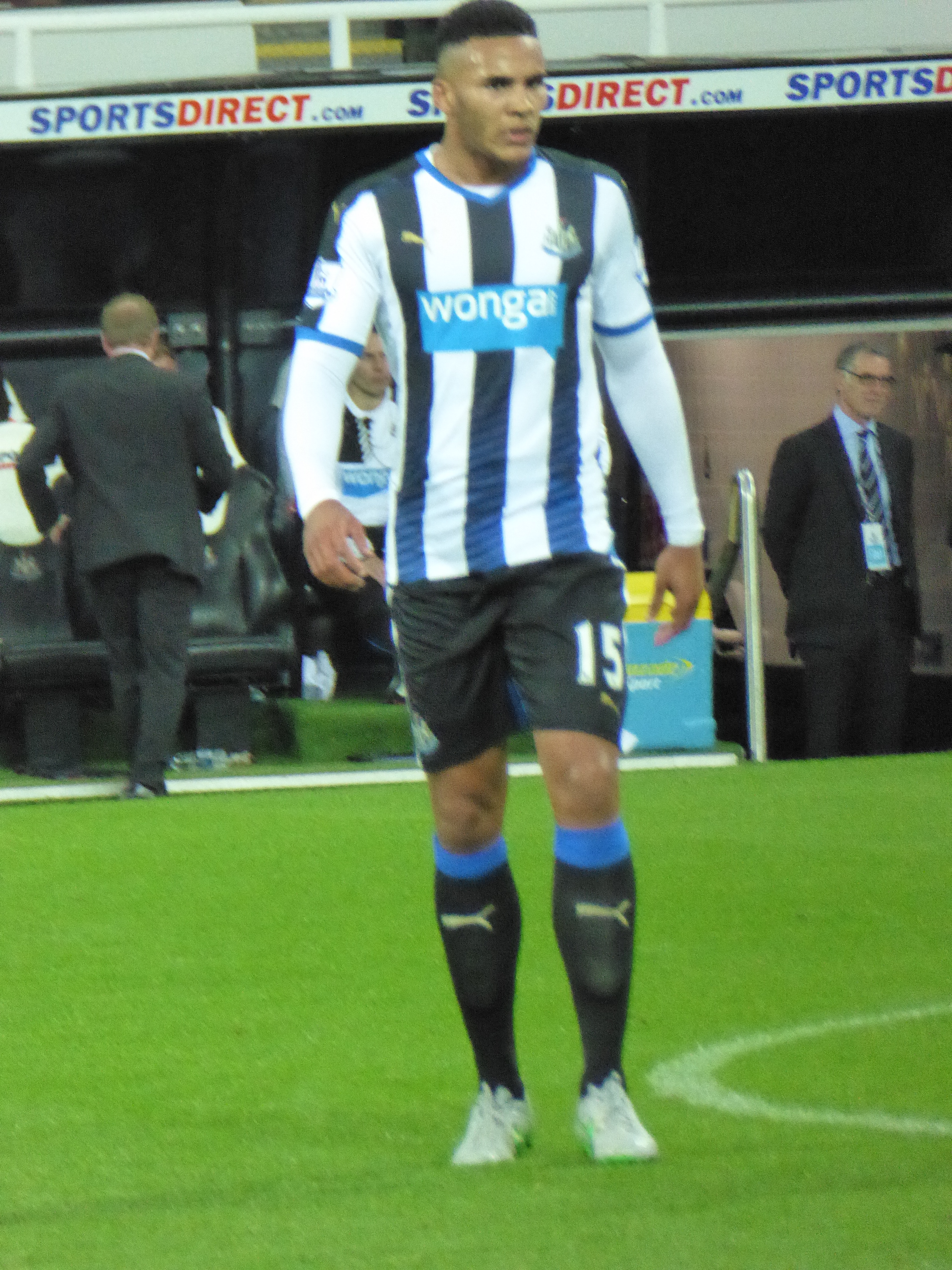
Lascelles playing for Newcastle United in 2015

On 9 August 2014, Lascelles signed a contract with Premier League club Newcastle United, joining on the same day as Forest teammate Karl Darlow. As part of the deal, both players were loaned back to Nottingham Forest for the 2014–15 season.

Lascelles returned to Newcastle for the 2015–16 season and made his debut for the club on 25 August 2015, against Northampton Town in the League Cup. He made his league debut on 3 October, as a substitute in a 6–1 defeat at Manchester City. Lascelles found first-team football hard to come by and did not make his first league start for Newcastle until 23 January 2016, when he played in the 2–1 defeat to Watford, capping his performance with a goal. Lascelles publicly criticised the mentality of his teammates after a 3–1 loss to Southampton on 11 April 2016, questioning their character and desire. Following injuries to first choice centre-backs Chancel Mbemba and Fabricio Coloccini, Lascelles was given regular minutes under new manager Rafael Benítez and gradually stepped up his game, grabbing his second goal for the club in the 3–0 win over Swansea City on 16 April. Lascelles totalled 18 appearances in his first Premier League season, but could not prevent the club getting relegated.

On 4 August 2016, Lascelles was chosen by Benítez to become the new Newcastle United team captain, succeeding the departing Coloccini. Benítez had been impressed by Lascelles' willingness to speak up in the dressing room, in particular his criticism of more senior players in the defeat to Southampton. Despite requiring a double hernia operation, Lascelles played through the pain barrier for the last four months of the 2016–17 season, determined to see the campaign out and ultimately captaining the club to promotion back to the Premier League. His solid performances at the beginning of the 2017–18 season led to him being nominated for the September Premier League Player of the Month award, which was eventually won by compatriot Harry Kane. On 6 October 2017, he signed a new six-year contract with Newcastle, keeping him at the club until 2023. That same month, he had a training ground fight with teammate Mohamed Diamé. The two players later apologised and offered to take the entire first-team squad and staff out for lunch.

In October 2018, he signed a new six-year contract until 2024. In November 2019 he suffered a knee injury. On 27 February 2021, he scored his first goal of the 2020–21 season, in a 1–1 home draw against Wolverhampton Wanderers. After the signing of defender Sven Botman in July 2022, Lascelles lost his starting place in the Newcastle defence for the following season. An injury to Botman in September 2023 saw Lascelles momentarily regain his place in the starting line-up. In March 2024, Lascelles suffered an injury to his anterior cruciate ligament (ACL), ruling him out for six to nine months. In September 2024, after Bruno Guimarães succeeded him as club captain, Newcastle manager Eddie Howe explained how important Lascelles' leadership and experience was, behind the scenes, for the squad dynamic. Although he did not play in the competition due to injury, he lifted Newcastle's first domestic trophy in 70 years, the EFL Cup, alongside fellow captains Guimarães and Kieran Trippier after Newcastle defeated Liverpool in the final on 16 March 2025.

=== Leicester City ===
On 3 February 2026, Lascelles departed Newcastle and signed a short-term contract with EFL Championship club Leicester City. On 24 May 2026, the club announced he would be released at the expiration of his contract following the team's relegation to EFL League One.

== International career ==
A former youth international, Lascelles represented England at all youth international levels from under-18 to under-21.

On 28 May 2013, he was named in manager Peter Taylor's 21-man squad for the 2013 FIFA U-20 World Cup. He made his debut on 16 June, in a 3–0 win in a warm-up game against Uruguay.

On 27 February 2014, Lascelles received his first under-21 call-up for the 2015 UEFA European Under-21 Championship qualifying match against Wales. He made his debut, and only under-21 appearance, starting in the qualifying match against Moldova on 9 September 2014.

== Personal life ==
Lascelles has a partner, Harpinder Rai. They have three children.

== Career statistics ==
As of match played 21 April 2026

Appearances and goals by club, season and competition
Club	Season	League			FA Cup		League Cup		Other		Total	
Club	Season	Division	Apps	Goals	Apps	Goals	Apps	Goals	Apps	Goals	Apps	Goals
Nottingham Forest	2011–12	Championship	1	0	0	0	0	0	—		1	0
Nottingham Forest	2012–13	Championship	2	0	0	0	1	0	—		3	0
Nottingham Forest	2013–14	Championship	29	2	3	0	2	1	—		34	3
Nottingham Forest (loan)	2014–15	Championship	26	1	0	0	2	0	—		28	1
Nottingham Forest (loan)	Forest total		58	3	3	0	5	1	—		66	4
Stevenage (loan)	2011–12	League One	7	1	—		—		2 (Note: Appearances in League One play-offs)	0	9	1
Newcastle United	2015–16	Premier League	18	2	1	0	2	0	—		21	2
Newcastle United	2016–17	Championship	43	3	1	0	3	0	—		47	3
Newcastle United	2017–18	Premier League	33	3	2	0	0	0	—		35	3
Newcastle United	2018–19	Premier League	32	0	2	0	0	0	—		34	0
Newcastle United	2019–20	Premier League	24	1	5	0	0	0	—		29	1
Newcastle United	2020–21	Premier League	19	2	1	0	1	1	—		21	3
Newcastle United	2021–22	Premier League	26	1	0	0	1	0	—		27	1
Newcastle United	2022–23	Premier League	7	0	1	0	3	1	—		11	1
Newcastle United	2023–24	Premier League	16	1	3	0	2	0	5 (Note: Appearances in UEFA Champions League)	0	26	1
Newcastle United	2024–25	Premier League	0	0	0	0	0	0	—		0	0
Newcastle United	2025–26	Premier League	2	0	0	0	0	0	0	0	2	0
Newcastle United	Total		220	13	16	0	12	1	5	0	253	15
Leicester City	2025–26	Championship	9	0	0	0	—		—		9	0
Career total			294	17	19	0	17	3	7	0	337	20

== Honours ==
Newcastle United

- EFL Championship: 2016–17
- EFL Cup 2024–25; runner-up: 2022–23

Individual

- PFA Team of the Year: 2016–17 Championship
- North-East FWA Player of the Year: 2017
- Newcastle United Player of the Year: 2017–18
