= Martin Dúbravka =

Slovak footballer (born 1989)

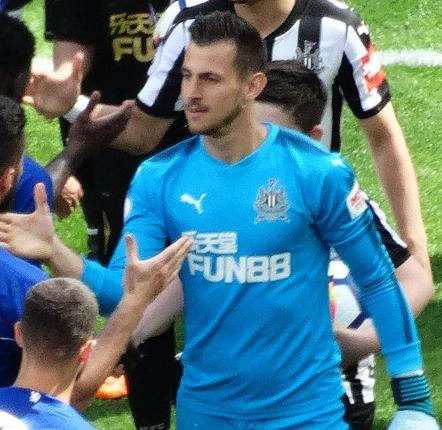
- Dúbravka with Newcastle United in 2018

Personal information
- Full name: Martin Dúbravka
- Date of birth: 15 January 1989 (age 37)
- Place of birth: Žilina, Czechoslovakia
- Height: 1.90 m (6 ft 3 in)
- Position: Goalkeeper

Team information
- Current team: Tottenham Hotspur
- Number: 39

Youth career
- 2006–2007: Žilina

Senior career*
Years	Team	Apps	(Gls)
2007–2014	Žilina	97	(0)
2014–2016	Esbjerg	66	(0)
2016–2017	Slovan Liberec	28	(0)
2017–2018	Sparta Prague	11	(0)
2018	→ Newcastle United (loan)	12	(0)
2018–2025	Newcastle United	162	(0)
2022–2023	→ Manchester United (loan)	0	(0)
2025–2026	Burnley	35	(0)
2026–	Tottenham Hotspur	0	(0)

International career^{‡}
2007–2008	Slovakia U19	6	(0)
2009–2010	Slovakia U21	10	(0)
2014–	Slovakia	61	(0)
- * Club domestic league appearances and goals as of 23:37, 1 May 2026 (UTC) ‡ National team caps and goals as of 08:47, 30 September 2026 (UTC)

Martin Dúbravka (born 15 January 1989) is a Slovak professional footballer who plays as a goalkeeper for Premier League club Tottenham Hotspur and the Slovakia national team.

After playing in the top flights of Slovak, Danish and Czech football, Dúbravka joined English club Newcastle United in January 2018, initially on loan, signing permanently a few months later. He won the club's Player of the Year award in the 2019–20 season. He briefly played for Manchester United on loan, playing twice in their EFL Cup-winning campaign in 2023. After leaving Newcastle in 2025, he joined newly-promoted Premier League side Burnley.

Dúbravka represented Slovakia at under-21 level, before making his senior international debut in May 2014. He started all of Slovakia's matches at both UEFA Euro 2020 and Euro 2024 as their first-choice goalkeeper.

== Early life ==
As a child, Dúbravka enjoyed playing ice hockey as well as football, and could have moved into the former sport if it was not for a leg injury he sustained when he was five years old.

== Club career ==
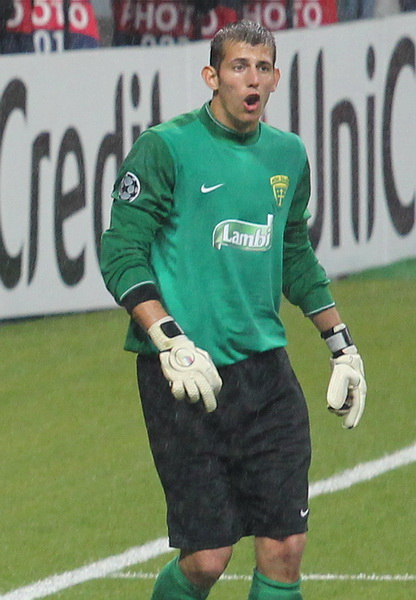
Dúbravka playing for Žilina in 2010

=== Žilina ===
In the 2009–10 Slovak Superliga, Dúbravka played 26 Slovak Superliga games, finishing as a league champion. He became a first choice after the transfer of Dušan Perniš in January 2010. He qualified with Žilina to the 2010–11 UEFA Champions League and played all 6 group games. He kept a clean sheet in the play-off round against Sparta Prague.

=== Esbjerg ===
On 30 January 2014, he signed a 3½-year deal with the Danish Superliga club Esbjerg.

=== Czech Republic ===
Dúbravka joined Slovan Liberec of the Czech First League in July 2016 on a one-year contract. He joined Sparta Prague in June 2017, signing a three-year contract.

=== Newcastle United ===
In January 2018, English side Newcastle United showed interest in Dúbravka, initially offering Sparta Prague a loan for €500,000, with an option to sign in the summer for €4.5 million. He finally joined the Premier League side on 31 January 2018, the final day of the winter transfer window on a half-year loan, due to expire at the end of 2017–18 season. According to iSport.cz, he joined the club for €2 million, with an option to sign in the summer for €4 million. He made his debut on 11 February, playing a pivotal role and keeping a clean sheet in a 1–0 win against Manchester United.

After a very successful loan spell, he signed permanently for Newcastle on 30 May 2018 for an undisclosed fee of around €5 million. On 17 February 2019 in Durham, Dúbravka was recognised as the 2018 Player of the Year by the North East Football Writers' Association, joining the likes of Alan Shearer, Kevin Keegan, and Shay Given. He became the seventh goalkeeper to win the award, over its thirty-nine seasons. Dúbravka stated that he was happy to win the award because "amazing players have won this trophy before". FourFourTwo ranked Dúbravka as the twentieth best player of the Premier League, in the 2018–19 season. He was the highest ranked goalkeeper, ahead of highly valued goalkeepers such as Alisson Becker (Liverpool) and David de Gea (Manchester United).

While Dúbravka was ever present for Newcastle for the next two seasons, he was mostly replaced in the FA Cup and EFL Cup, by either Karl Darlow or Freddie Woodman. His performances during the 2019–20 season saw him win the club's Player of the Year award. In August 2020, Dúbravka injured his ankle in a training session prior to the start of the 2020–21 season. Darlow played in his absence and he returned to the bench for the club's last match of the year, a 0–0 draw with Liverpool.

On 9 January 2021, Dúbravka started his first match of the season, in a FA Cup extra-time loss to Arsenal. On 27 February, Dúbravka started his first league match of the season in a 1–1 draw with Wolverhampton Wanderers. Afterwards, he went on to make twelve more appearances in goal as Newcastle, despite having been in a relegation battle for much of the season, finished in twelfth place.

==== Loan to Manchester United ====
After losing his place in the starting line-up to Nick Pope, who had just joined from Burnley, on 1 September 2022, Dúbravka joined Manchester United on a season-long loan from Newcastle. Two days later, it was confirmed that he would wear the number 31 shirt, last worn by Nemanja Matić. He made his debut in Man United's 4–2 win over Aston Villa in the EFL Cup third round on 10 November.

==== Return to Newcastle ====
Newcastle recalled Dúbravka from the loan on 1 January 2023. He made two appearances, both in the 2022–23 EFL Cup, keeping one clean sheet. He played in Newcastle's 2–1 FA Cup third round defeat to Sheffield Wednesday. He made his first Premier League appearance since the last day of the previous season on 18 February 2023, replacing Elliot Anderson after Nick Pope was sent off for handling the ball outside the penalty area in the 2–0 home defeat to Liverpool.

Dúbravka was cup-tied for the 2023 EFL Cup final on 26 February, having played for Newcastle's opponents in the third and fourth rounds, which Manchester United won 2–0. He later confirmed that he did receive a winning medal for the final due to his time in Manchester. During the month of January 2025, Martin Dubravka replaced Nick Pope and won the ‘save of the month award’ by the Premier League against Wolverhampton Wanderers in Newcastle United's 3–0 match.

On 16 March 2025, Dúbravka appeared on the bench in the 2025 EFL Cup final as Newcastle won their first major domestic trophy in 70 years. Dúbravka played an important role in the success, having played in four of the six games en route to the final, including keeping clean sheets in both legs of the semi-final victory against Arsenal.

=== Burnley ===
On 7 August 2025, Dúbravka left Newcastle and joined newly-promoted club Burnley on a one-year contract. On 10 June 2026, the club announced he would be released following the end of the 2025–26 season.

=== Tottenham Hotspur ===
On 24 June 2026, Dúbravka joined Premier League club Tottenham Hotspur.

== International career ==
On 23 May 2014, he made his debut for the Slovakia national team in a 2–0 win over Montenegro.

In January 2017, Dúbravka played his first full game for the national team, having played 45 minutes in both of his previous matches. Although Dúbravka was benched against Uganda (3–1 loss), he played in an unofficial friendly match against Sweden in Abu Dhabi, United Arab Emirates. Slovakia lost the game 6–0 despite only trailing 1–0 at half time. This match also marked the first time Dúbravka conceded in the national team and he was also Slovak captain for the game, being the most experienced with international football.

=== 2018 FIFA World Cup qualification ===
On 10 June 2017, Dúbravka made his competitive debut in a 2018 FIFA World Cup qualifier against Lithuania (2–1 win), when the preferred goalkeeper in the qualification, Matúš Kozáčik, did not play due to an injury. However, Dúbravka achieved his first competitive clean sheet on 1 September in a home qualifier against Slovenia.

After Kozáčik's return to the squad, Dúbravka remained the preferred choice for the remaining matches against England, Scotland and Malta. In the match against Scotland, Dúbravka made a series of saves before he was finally beaten by an own goal from Martin Škrtel.

=== UEFA Euro 2020 and 2024 ===
Dúbravka missed all the national team fixtures of 2020 due to injuries ruling him out of play during the autumn of the year. He returned to the national team in March 2021, in a 0–0 draw with Cyprus and made notable saves in the second half preventing an upset loss and received some praise for them, while the team received overall criticisms for the upset result and the performance labelled as "boring".

Dúbravka was named in Slovakia's final squad for UEFA Euro 2020, where he played in all three group matches. Going into the match against Spain on 23 June, Slovakia needed a draw to advance to the knockout stage. Dúbravka started well, saving a penalty from Álvaro Morata in the twelfth minute. After a shot from Pablo Sarabia hit the crossbar, he tried to tip the ball away and instead punched the ball into his own net. By doing so, he became the first goalkeeper in European Championship history to save a penalty and score an own goal in the same match. Dúbravka went on to concede four goals as Spain won the match 5–0.

In June 2024, Dúbravka was selected for Slovakia's squad for UEFA Euro 2024, appearing at his second UEFA European Championship. He played in all four of the team's matches, keeping a clean sheet in the opening Group E match as Slovakia beat Belgium 1–0 in Frankfurt.

== Style of play ==
Dúbravka is a third-generation goalkeeper: his father and grandfather also played in the position. Dúbravka has been dubbed the "quintessential sweeper-keeper" due to his "outstanding footwork" and he believes "in modern football the keeper's almost like a libero. You need to play with the ball, not just kick it long".

Louise Taylor of The Guardian dubbed Dúbravka the "reluctant keeper" after he admitted his favourite position to play is right wing; he sometimes plays as an outfielder in training and coaching staff have suggested that he switch to a midfield role.

== Personal life ==
Dúbravka lives with his girlfriend Lucia, and his dog. In March 2021, the couple welcomed their son, Viliam.

== Career statistics ==
=== Club ===
As of match played 15 September 2026

Appearances and goals by club, season and competition
Club	Season	League			National cup (Note: Includes Slovak Cup, Danish Cup, Czech Cup, FA Cup)		League cup (Note: Includes EFL Cup)		Europe		Other		Total	
Club	Season	Division	Apps	Goals	Apps	Goals	Apps	Goals	Apps	Goals	Apps	Goals	Apps	Goals
Žilina	2007–08	Slovak Super Liga	0	0	0	0	—		0	0	—		0	0
Žilina	2008–09	Slovak Super Liga	1	0	0	0	—		0	0	—		1	0
Žilina	2009–10	Slovak Super Liga	26	0	0	0	—		0	0	—		26	0
Žilina	2010–11	Slovak Super Liga	24	0	1	0	—		12 (Note: Appearance(s) in UEFA Champions League)	0	1 (Note: Appearance in Slovak Super Cup)	0	38	0
Žilina	2011–12	Slovak Super Liga	8	0	0	0	—		2 (Note: Appearances in UEFA Europa League)	0	—		10	0
Žilina	2012–13	Slovak Super Liga	26	0	5	0	—		2	0	—		33	0
Žilina	2013–14	Slovak Super Liga	13	0	0	0	—		6	0	—		19	0
Žilina	Total		98	0	6	0	—		22	0	1	0	127	0
Esbjerg fB	2013–14	Danish Superliga	15	0	—		—		2	0	—		17	0
Esbjerg fB	2014–15	Danish Superliga	33	0	3	0	—		4	0	—		40	0
Esbjerg fB	2015–16	Danish Superliga	18	0	1	0	—		—		—		19	0
Esbjerg fB	Total		66	0	4	0	—		6	0	—		76	0
Slovan Liberec	2016–17	Czech First League	28	0	0	0	—		9	0	—		37	0
Sparta Prague	2017–18	Czech First League	11	0	2	0	—		2	0	—		15	0
Newcastle United (loan)	2017–18	Premier League	12	0	—		—		—		—		12	0
Newcastle United	2018–19	Premier League	38	0	0	0	0	0	—		—		38	0
Newcastle United	2019–20	Premier League	38	0	1	0	0	0	—		—		39	0
Newcastle United	2020–21	Premier League	13	0	1	0	0	0	—		—		14	0
Newcastle United	2021–22	Premier League	26	0	1	0	0	0	—		—		27	0
Newcastle United	2022–23	Premier League	2	0	1	0	0	0	—		—		3	0
Newcastle United	2023–24	Premier League	23	0	4	0	2	0	1	0	—		30	0
Newcastle United	2024–25	Premier League	10	0	2	0	4	0	—		—		16	0
Newcastle United	Total		162	0	10	0	6	0	1	0	—		179	0
Manchester United (loan)	2022–23	Premier League	0	0	—		2	0	0	0	—		2	0
Burnley	2025–26	Premier League	35	0	0	0	0	0	—		—		35	0
Tottenham Hotspur	2026–27	Premier League	0	0	0	0	1	0	—		—		1	0
Career total			400	0	22	0	9	0	40	0	1	0	472	0

=== International ===
As of match played 29 September 2026

Appearances and goals by national team and year
National team	Year	Apps	Goals
Slovakia	2014	1	0
Slovakia	2016	1	0
Slovakia	2017	7	0
Slovakia	2018	7	0
Slovakia	2019	8	0
Slovakia	2021	6	0
Slovakia	2022	2	0
Slovakia	2023	9	0
Slovakia	2024	9	0
Slovakia	2025	9	0
Slovakia	2026	2	0
Total		61	0

== Honours ==
Žilina

- Slovak Superliga: 2009–10, 2011–12
- Slovak Super Cup: 2010

Manchester United

- EFL Cup: 2022–23

Newcastle United

- EFL Cup: 2024–25

Individual

- Newcastle United Player of the Year: 2019–20
- North East FWA Player of the Year: 2018
- Premier League Save of the Month: January 2025, October 2025
