= 2017–18 Newcastle United F.C. season =

Newcastle United
2017–18 season
- Owner: Mike Ashley
- Managing Director: Lee Charnley
- Manager: Rafael Benítez
- Stadium: St James' Park
- Premier League: 10th
- EFL Cup: Second round (knocked out by Nottingham Forest)
- FA Cup: Fourth round (knocked out by Chelsea)
- Top goalscorer: League: Ayoze Pérez (8); All: Ayoze Pérez (10)
Home colours	Away colours	Third colours

The 2017–18 season was Newcastle United's first season back in the Premier League following their promotion from the EFL Championship last season. It was their 23rd year in the Premier League since it was formed at the start of the 1992-93 Season, and it was their 86th season overall in the top division of English football. This season Newcastle United participated in the Premier League, EFL Cup and FA Cup. The season covered the period from 1 July 2017 to 30 June 2018.

== Club ==
=== Coaching staff ===
The Newcastle United first team coaching staff for the 2017–18 season consists of the following:

==== First Team ====
Position	Staff
Manager	(Spain) Rafael Benítez
Assistant Manager	(Spain) Francisco "Paco" de Míguel Moreno
First Team Coach	(Spain) Mikel Antía
First Team Coach	(Spain) Antonio Gómez Pérez
Goalkeeping Coach	(England) Simon Smith
Head of Medicine	(England) Paul Catterson
Rehabilitation Fitness Coach	(Spain) Cristian Fernández Martínez
Head of Physiotherapy	(England) Derek Wright
Physiotherapist	(Spain) Daniel Martí
Physiotherapist	(England) Michael Harding
Head of Recruitment	(England) Steve Nickson
Head of Analysis	(England) Kerry Morrow

== Squads ==
=== First team squad ===
Squad No.	Name	Nationality	Position(s)	Date of birth (age)	Signed	Signed from
Goalkeepers
1	Rob Elliot	(Republic of Ireland) (Note: Elliot was born in Greenwich, England.)	GK	30 April 1986 (aged 32)	2011	(England) Charlton Athletic
12	Martin Dúbravka	(Slovakia)	GK	15 January 1989 (aged 29)	2018	(Czech Republic) Sparta Prague
26	Karl Darlow	(England)	GK	8 October 1990 (aged 27)	2014	(England) Nottingham Forest
Defenders
2	Ciaran Clark	(Republic of Ireland) (Note: Clark was born in Harrow, England.)	CB / LB	26 September 1989 (aged 28)	2016	(England) Aston Villa
3	Paul Dummett	(Wales) (Note: Dummett was born in Newcastle upon Tyne, England.)	LB / CB	26 September 1991 (aged 26)	2010	(England) Newcastle United Academy
6	Jamaal Lascelles	(England)	CB	11 November 1993 (aged 24)	2014	(England) Nottingham Forest
18	Chancel Mbemba	(Democratic Republic of the Congo)	CB / RB / LB	8 August 1994 (aged 23)	2015	(Belgium) Anderlecht
19	Javier Manquillo	(Spain)	RB / LB	5 May 1994 (aged 24)	2017	(Spain) Atlético Madrid
20	Florian Lejeune	(France)	CB	20 May 1991 (aged 27)	2017	(Spain) Eibar
22	DeAndre Yedlin	(United States)	RB	9 July 1993 (aged 24)	2016	(England) Tottenham Hotspur
25	Massadio Haïdara	(France)	LB	2 December 1992 (aged 25)	2013	(France) Nancy
27	Jesús Gámez	(Spain)	RB / LB	10 April 1985 (aged 33)	2016	(Spain) Atlético Madrid
Midfielders
7	Jacob Murphy	(England)	RW / LW	24 February 1995 (aged 23)	2017	(England) Norwich City
8	Jonjo Shelvey	(England)	CM	27 February 1992 (aged 26)	2016	(Wales) Swansea City
10	Mohamed Diamé	(Senegal)	CM / AM	14 June 1987 (aged 31)	2016	(England) Hull City
11	Matt Ritchie	(Scotland) (Note: Ritchie was born in Gosport, England.)	RW / LW	10 September 1989 (aged 28)	2016	(England) AFC Bournemouth
14	Isaac Hayden	(England)	CM / DM	22 March 1995 (aged 23)	2016	(England) Arsenal
15	Kenedy	(Brazil)	LW / LB	8 February 1996 (aged 22)	2018	(England) Chelsea
23	Mikel Merino	(Spain)	CM / DM	22 June 1996 (aged 22)	2017	(Germany) Borussia Dortmund
30	Christian Atsu	(Ghana)	RW / LW	10 January 1992 (aged 26)	2017	(England) Chelsea
Forwards
9	Dwight Gayle	(England)	ST	17 October 1989 (aged 28)	2016	(England) Crystal Palace
13	Islam Slimani	(Algeria)	ST	18 June 1988 (aged 30)	2018	(England) Leicester City
17	Ayoze Pérez	(Spain)	SS / ST	29 July 1993 (aged 24)	2014	(Spain) Tenerife
21	Joselu	(Spain) (Note: Joselu was born in Stuttgart, Germany.)	ST	27 March 1990 (aged 28)	2017	(England) Stoke City
Out on loan
4	Jack Colback	(England)	DM / CM	24 October 1989 (aged 28)	2014	(England) Sunderland
16	Rolando Aarons	(England) (Note: Aarons was born in Kingston, Jamaica.)	LW	16 November 1995 (aged 22)	2014	(England) Newcastle United Academy
24	Henri Saivet	(Senegal)	CM / AM	26 October 1990 (aged 27)	2016	(France) Bordeaux
33	Achraf Lazaar	(Morocco)	LB / LW	22 January 1992 (aged 26)	2016	(Italy) Palermo
35	Daniel Barlaser	(England)	CM / AM	18 January 1997 (aged 21)	2015	(England) Newcastle United Academy
41	Freddie Woodman	(England)	GK	4 March 1997 (aged 21)	2014	(England) Newcastle United Academy
42	Jamie Sterry	(England)	RB	21 November 1995 (aged 22)	2015	(England) Newcastle United Academy
45	Aleksandar Mitrović	(Serbia)	ST	16 September 1994 (aged 23)	2015	(Belgium) Anderlecht
–	Matz Sels	(Belgium)	GK	26 February 1992 (aged 26)	2016	(Belgium) Gent
–	Stuart Findlay	(Scotland)	CB / LB	14 September 1995 (aged 22)	2016	(Scotland) Celtic
–	Adam Armstrong	(England)	SS / ST / LW	10 February 1997 (aged 21)	2014	(England) Newcastle United Academy
–	Ivan Toney	(England)	ST	16 March 1996 (aged 22)	2015	(England) Northampton Town

== Transfers and loans ==
=== Transfers in ===
Date from	Position	Number	Nationality	Name	From	Fee	Ref.
1 July 2017	RW	30	(Ghana)	Christian Atsu	(England) Chelsea	£6,200,000	
4 July 2017	CB	20	(France)	Florian Lejeune	(Spain) Eibar	£8,700,000	
19 July 2017	RW	7	(England)	Jacob Murphy	(England) Norwich City	£12,000,000	
21 July 2017	RB	19	(Spain)	Javier Manquillo	(Spain) Atlético Madrid	£4,500,000	
16 August 2017	FW	21	(Spain)	Joselu	(England) Stoke City	£5,000,000	
13 October 2017	CM	23	(Spain)	Mikel Merino	(Germany) Borussia Dortmund	£8,500,000	

- Total spending: ▼£44,900,000

=== Transfers out ===
Date from	Position	Number	Nationality	Name	To	Fee	Ref.
1 July 2017	RB	43	(Switzerland)	Kevin Mbabu	(Switzerland) Young Boys	Undisclosed	
1 July 2017	CB	—	(Slovakia)	Ľubomír Šatka	(Slovakia) DAC Dunajská Streda	Free	
1 July 2017	RW	—	(France)	Florian Thauvin	(France) Marseille	£9,500,000	
1 July 2017	SS	—	(Slovenia)	Haris Vučkić	(Netherlands) Twente	Free	
6 July 2017	RB	8	(Netherlands)	Vurnon Anita	(England) Leeds United	Free	
14 July 2017	RW	34	(Nigeria)	Sammy Ameobi	(England) Bolton Wanderers	Free	
17 July 2017	LW	20	(France)	Yoan Gouffran	(Turkey) Göztepe	Free	
21 July 2017	FW	33	(Republic of Ireland)	Daryl Murphy	(England) Nottingham Forest	£2,000,000	
27 July 2017	LB	—	(England)	Lewis Gibson	(England) Everton	£6,000,000	
25 August 2017	FW	—	(France)	Emmanuel Rivière	(France) Metz	Undisclosed	
28 August 2017	AM	15	(Netherlands)	Siem de Jong	(Netherlands) Ajax	Undisclosed	
30 August 2017	CB	5	(Scotland)	Grant Hanley	(England) Norwich City	£3,500,000	
20 September 2017	GK	—	(Netherlands)	Tim Krul	(England) Brighton & Hove Albion	Free	

- Total incoming: ▲ ~ £21,000,000

=== Loans in ===
Date from	Position	Number	Nationality	Name	From	Expiry	Ref.
28 July 2017	CM	23	(Spain)	Mikel Merino	(Germany) Borussia Dortmund	13 October 2017	
23 January 2018	LW	15	(Brazil)	Kenedy	(England) Chelsea	30 June 2018	
31 January 2018	FW	13	(Algeria)	Islam Slimani	(England) Leicester City	30 June 2018	
31 January 2018	GK	12	(Slovakia)	Martin Dúbravka	(Czech Republic) Sparta Prague	30 June 2018	

=== Loans out ===
Date from	Position	Number	Nationality	Name	To	Expiry	Ref.
1 July 2017	GK	—	(Belgium)	Matz Sels	(Belgium) Anderlecht	30 June 2018	
7 July 2017	RW	—	(England)	Alex Gilliead	(England) Bradford City	30 June 2018	
17 July 2017	FW	—	(England)	Adam Armstrong	(England) Bolton Wanderers	4 January 2018	
21 July 2017	AM	—	(England)	Sean Longstaff	(England) Blackpool	30 June 2018	
2 August 2017	FW	—	(England)	Ivan Toney	(England) Wigan Athletic	10 January 2018	
8 August 2017	CB	—	(England)	Callum Williams	(England) Gateshead	30 June 2018	
25 August 2017	CB	—	(Scotland)	Stuart Findlay	(Scotland) Kilmarnock	30 June 2018	
31 August 2017	LB	33	(Morocco)	Achraf Lazaar	(Italy) Benevento	30 June 2018	
31 August 2017	GK	—	(Netherlands)	Tim Krul	(England) Brighton & Hove Albion	20 September 2017	
9 January 2018	FW	—	(England)	Adam Armstrong	(England) Blackburn Rovers	30 June 2018	
11 January 2018	FW	—	(England)	Ivan Toney	(England) Scunthorpe United	30 June 2018	
18 January 2018	CB	—	(Scotland)	Kyle Cameron	(Scotland) Queen of the South	30 June 2018	
19 January 2018	CM	35	(England)	Daniel Barlaser	(England) Crewe Alexandra	30 June 2018	
31 January 2018	RB	42	(England)	Jamie Sterry	(England) Crewe Alexandra	30 June 2018	
31 January 2018	CM	24	(Senegal)	Henri Saivet	(Turkey) Sivasspor	30 June 2018	
31 January 2018	LW	16	(England)	Rolando Aarons	(Italy) Hellas Verona	30 June 2018	
31 January 2018	GK	41	(England)	Freddie Woodman	(Scotland) Aberdeen	30 June 2018	
31 January 2018	DM	4	(England)	Jack Colback	(England) Nottingham Forest	30 June 2018	
31 January 2018	FW	45	(Serbia)	Aleksandar Mitrović	(England) Fulham	30 June 2018	

== Pre-season and friendlies ==
As of 28 June 2017, Newcastle United have announced six pre-season friendlies against Heart of Midlothian, Preston North End, Bradford City, FSV Mainz, VfL Wolfsburg and Hellas Verona.

On 12 March 2018, Newcastle United announced they would be playing Belgian side Royal Antwerp on 18 March 2018 at the Pinatar Arena in Murcia, Spain.

14 July 2017	Heart of Midlothian	1–2	Newcastle United	Edinburgh
19:45	Walker 20'	Report	Gayle 3', 25'	Stadium: Tynecastle Stadium; Attendance: 10,001; Referee: William Collum

22 July 2017	Preston North End	1–1	Newcastle United	Preston
15:00	Barkhuizen 33'	Report	Mitrović 8'	Stadium: Deepdale; Attendance: 7,380; Referee: Jon Moss

26 July 2017	Bradford City	0–4	Newcastle United	Bradford
19:30		Report	Gayle 50'; Murphy 51', 79'; Mitrović 76'	Stadium: Valley Parade; Attendance: 7,601; Referee: Geoff Eltringham

29 July 2017	Mainz 05	2–1	Newcastle United	Mainz
16:00	Öztunalı 5'; Fischer 84'	Report	Gámez 65'	Stadium: Opel Arena; Attendance: 6,470; Referee: Christian Dingert

2 August 2017	VFL Wolfsburg	1–3	Newcastle United	Wolfsburg
16:00	Mallı 52'	Report	Mitrović 37'; Ritchie 45'; Atsu 68'	Stadium: AOK Stadion; Attendance: 3,011; Referee: Robert Schroder

6 August 2017	Newcastle United	2–0	Hellas Verona	Newcastle upon Tyne
15:00	Ayoze 4'; Atsu 12'	Report		Stadium: St James' Park; Attendance: 23,906; Referee: Neil Swarbrick

18 March 2018	Newcastle United	1–1	Royal Antwerp	Murcia
11:00	Ritchie 40'	Report	Corryn 91'	Stadium: Pinatar Arena; Attendance: 1,000; Referee: José Joaquín Gallego Gambin

== Competitions ==
=== Overall summary ===
Competition	Started round	Current position / round	Final position / round	First match	Last match
Premier League	–	–	10th	13 August 2017	13 May 2018
EFL Cup	Second round	–	Second round	23 August 2017	23 August 2017
FA Cup	Third round	–	Fourth round	6 January 2018	28 January 2018

=== Overview ===
Competition	Record							
Competition	P	W	D	L	GF	GA	GD	Win %
Premier League	38	12	8	18	39	47	−8	31.58
EFL Cup	1	0	0	1	2	3	−1	0.00
FA Cup	2	1	0	1	3	4	−1	50.00
Total	41	13	8	20	44	54	−10	31.71

Source: Competitions

=== Premier League ===
==== League table ====
Pos	Team	Pld	W	D	L	GF	GA	GD	Pts
8	Everton	38	13	10	15	44	58	−14	49
9	Leicester City	38	12	11	15	56	60	−4	47
10	Newcastle United	38	12	8	18	39	47	−8	44
11	Crystal Palace	38	11	11	16	45	55	−10	44
12	Bournemouth	38	11	11	16	45	61	−16	44

Source: Premier League
Rules for classification: 1) Points; 2) Goal difference; 3) Goals scored. 4) Play-offs (only if needed to decide champion, teams for relegation or teams for UEFA competitions).

==== Results summary ====
Overall								Home						Away					
Pld	W	D	L	GF	GA	GD	Pts	W	D	L	GF	GA	GD	W	D	L	GF	GA	GD
38	12	8	18	39	47	−8	44	8	4	7	21	17	+4	4	4	11	18	30	−12

Last updated: 13 May 2018.
Source: Premier League

==== Results by matchday ====
Round	1	2	3	4	5	6	7	8	9	10	11	12	13	14	15	16	17	18	19	20	21	22	23	24	25	26	27	28	29	30	31	32	33	34	35	36	37	38
Ground	H	A	H	A	H	A	H	A	H	A	H	A	H	A	A	H	H	A	A	H	H	A	H	A	H	A	H	A	A	H	H	A	H	A	H	A	A	H
Result	L	L	W	W	W	L	D	D	W	L	L	L	L	D	L	L	L	L	W	L	D	W	D	L	D	D	W	D	L	W	W	W	W	L	L	L	L	W
Position	18	17	14	10	4	10	9	9	7	9	11	11	14	12	15	16	16	18	15	15	16	13	15	15	14	16	13	15	16	13	12	10	10	10	10	10	10	10

A = Away; H = Home; W = Win; D = Draw; L = Loss

==== Matches ====
On 14 June 2017, the 2017–18 Premier League fixtures were announced.

13 August 2017 1	Newcastle United	0–2	Tottenham Hotspur	Newcastle upon Tyne
13:30 BST	Shelvey (red card) 48'; Ritchie (yellow card) 52'	Report	Kane (yellow card) 31'; Alli 61'; Davies 70', (yellow card) 86'	Stadium: St James' Park; Attendance: 52,077; Referee: Andre Marriner
Note: Live on Sky Sports

20 August 2017 2	Huddersfield Town	1–0	Newcastle United	Huddersfield
13:30 BST	Mooy 50'; Billing (yellow card) 66'; Palmer (yellow card) 77'; Mounié (yellow card) 88'	Report	Ritchie (yellow card) 41'; Hayden (yellow card) 53'; Joselu (yellow card) 64'; Lascelles (yellow card) 90+1'	Stadium: John Smith's Stadium; Attendance: 24,128; Referee: Craig Pawson
Note: Live on Sky Sports

26 August 2017 3	Newcastle United	3–0	West Ham United	Newcastle upon Tyne
15:00 BST	Joselu 36'; Clark 72'; Merino (yellow card) 83'; Mitrović 86'	Report	Hernández (yellow card) 17'; Fernandes (yellow card) 65'; Sakho (yellow card) 78'	Stadium: St James' Park; Attendance: 52,093; Referee: Neil Swarbrick

10 September 2017 4	Swansea City	0–1	Newcastle United	Swansea
16:00 BST	Naughton (yellow card) 48'; Fer (yellow card) 80'	Report	Hayden (yellow card) 8'; Ritchie (yellow card) 49'; Lascelles 76'; Gayle (yellow card) 87'	Stadium: Liberty Stadium; Attendance: 20,872; Referee: Mike Jones
Note: Live on Sky Sports

16 September 2017 5	Newcastle United	2–1	Stoke City	Newcastle upon Tyne
15:00 BST	Atsu 18'; Hayden (yellow card) 25'; Lascelles 68'; Clark (yellow card) 73'; Merino (yellow card) 77'	Report	Wimmer (yellow card) 30'; Shaqiri 57'	Stadium: St James' Park; Attendance: 51,795; Referee: Stuart Attwell

24 September 2017 6	Brighton & Hove Albion	1–0	Newcastle United	Falmer
16:00 BST	Knockaert (yellow card) 13'; Hemed 51'; Duffy (yellow card) 77'	Report	Lascelles (yellow card) 90+3'	Stadium: Falmer Stadium; Attendance: 30,468; Referee: Andre Marriner
Note: Live on Sky Sports

1 October 2017 7	Newcastle United	1–1	Liverpool	Newcastle upon Tyne
16:30 BST	Joselu 36'; Ayoze (yellow card) 55'	Report	Coutinho 28'; Gomez (yellow card) 58'	Stadium: St James' Park; Attendance: 52,303; Referee: Craig Pawson
Note: Live on Sky Sports

15 October 2017 8	Southampton	2–2	Newcastle United	Southampton
16:00 BST	Gabbiadini 49', 75' (pen.), (yellow card) 77'	Report	Hayden 20', (yellow card) 79'; Yedlin (yellow card) 40'; Ayoze 51'	Stadium: St Mary's Stadium; Attendance: 31,437; Referee: Kevin Friend
Note: Live on Sky Sports

21 October 2017 9	Newcastle United	1–0	Crystal Palace	Newcastle upon Tyne
15:00 BST	Lejeune (yellow card) 21'; Lascelles (yellow card) 29'; Manquillo (yellow card) 60'; Joselu (yellow card) 66'; Merino 86'	Report	Cabaye (yellow card) 28'; Van Aanholt (yellow card) 29'	Stadium: St James' Park; Attendance: 52,251; Referee: Stuart Attwell

30 October 2017 10	Burnley	1–0	Newcastle United	Burnley
20:00 GMT	Guðmundsson (yellow card) 45'; Cork (yellow card) 62'; Hendrick 74'; Tarkowski (yellow card) 75'	Report		Stadium: Turf Moor; Attendance: 21,031; Referee: Mike Dean
Note: Live on Sky Sports

4 November 2017 11	Newcastle United	0–1	AFC Bournemouth	Newcastle upon Tyne
15:00 GMT	Lejeune (yellow card) 63'; Shelvey (yellow card) 84'	Report	Surman (yellow card) 20'; Francis (yellow card) 77'; Cook 90+2'	Stadium: St James' Park; Attendance: 52,237; Referee: Paul Tierney

18 November 2017 12	Manchester United	4–1	Newcastle United	Manchester
17:30 GMT	Martial 37'; Smalling 45+1', (yellow card) 67'; Pogba 54'; Lukaku 71'	Report	Hayden (yellow card) 12'; Gayle 14'	Stadium: Old Trafford; Attendance: 75,035; Referee: Craig Pawson
Note: Live on BT Sport

25 November 2017 13	Newcastle United	0–3	Watford	Newcastle upon Tyne
15:00 GMT	Shelvey (yellow card) 15'	Report	Hughes 19'; Zeegelaar (yellow card) 24'; Yedlin 45+1' (o.g.); Gray 62'; Prödl (yellow card) 90+2'	Stadium: St James' Park; Attendance: 52,188; Referee: Chris Kavanagh

28 November 2017 14	West Bromwich Albion	2–2	Newcastle United	West Bromwich
20:00 GMT	Robson-Kanu 45+1'; Field 56'	Report	Clark 59'; Evans 83' (o.g.)	Stadium: The Hawthorns; Attendance: 25,534; Referee: Lee Probert

2 December 2017 15	Chelsea	3–1	Newcastle United	Fulham
12:30 GMT	Hazard 21', 74' (pen.); Morata 33'	Report	Gayle 12'; Clark (yellow card) 45+1'	Stadium: Stamford Bridge; Attendance: 41,538; Referee: Kevin Friend
Note: Live on Sky Sports

9 December 2017 16	Newcastle United	2–3	Leicester City	Newcastle upon Tyne
17:30	Joselu 4'; Gayle 73'; Hayden (yellow card) 75'; Lejeune (yellow card) 81'	Report	Mahrez 20'; Gray (yellow card) 12', (goal) 60'; Ayoze 86' (o.g.)	Stadium: St James' Park; Attendance: 52,117; Referee: Neil Swarbrick
Note: Live on BT Sport

13 December 2017 17	Newcastle United	0–1	Everton	Newcastle upon Tyne
19:45 GMT	Shelvey (yellow card) 42' (yellow-red card) 90+4'; Merino (yellow card) 56'	Report	Rooney 27'; Holgate (yellow card) 48'; Calvert-Lewin (yellow card) 90+3'	Stadium: St James' Park; Attendance: 51,042; Referee: Martin Atkinson

16 December 2017 18	Arsenal	1–0	Newcastle United	London
15:00 GMT	Özil 23'; Monreal (yellow card) 86'; Xhaka (yellow card) 90+2'	Report	Hayden (yellow card) 40'	Stadium: Emirates Stadium; Attendance: 59,379; Referee: Stuart Attwell

23 December 2017 19	West Ham United	2–3	Newcastle United	Stratford
15:00 GMT	Arnautović 6'; Ayew (penalty missed) 56', 69'; Kouyaté (yellow card) 77'	Report	Saivet 10'; Diamé 53'; Atsu 61', (yellow card) 67'	Stadium: London Stadium; Attendance: 56,955; Referee: Lee Mason

27 December 2017 20	Newcastle United	0–1	Manchester City	Newcastle upon Tyne
19:45 GMT	Gayle (yellow card) 75'	Report	Sterling 31'	Stadium: St James' Park; Attendance: 52,311; Referee: Andre Marriner
Note: Live on Sky Sports

30 December 2017 21	Newcastle United	0–0	Brighton & Hove Albion	Newcastle upon Tyne
15:00 GMT	Yedlin (yellow card) 61'; Merino (yellow card) 74'	Report	Knockaert (yellow card) 73'; Dunk (yellow card) 90+1'	Stadium: St James' Park; Attendance: 52,209; Referee: Anthony Taylor

1 January 2018 22	Stoke City	0–1	Newcastle United	Stoke-on-Trent
15:00 GMT	Allen (yellow card) 54'; Choupo-Moting (yellow card) 60'; Wimmer (yellow card) 66'	Report	Manquillo (yellow card) 26'; Ayoze 73'	Stadium: bet365 Stadium; Attendance: 28,471; Referee: Chris Kavanagh

13 January 2018 23	Newcastle United	1–1	Swansea City	Newcastle upon Tyne
15:00 GMT	Joselu 68'	Report	Bartley (yellow card) 10'; Ayew 60', (yellow card) 90'; Mawson (yellow card) 85'	Stadium: St James' Park; Attendance: 51,444; Referee: Graham Scott

20 January 2018 24	Manchester City	3–1	Newcastle United	Manchester
17:30 GMT	Agüero 34', 63' (pen.), 83'	Report	Murphy 67'; Clark (yellow card) 78'	Stadium: City of Manchester Stadium; Attendance: 54,452; Referee: Paul Tierney
Note: Live on BT Sport

31 January 2018 25	Newcastle United	1–1	Burnley	Newcastle upon Tyne
19:45 GMT	Yedlin (yellow card) 30'; Joselu (penalty missed) 34'; Lascelles 65'	Report	Barnes (yellow card) 63'; Vokes (yellow card) 73'; Darlow 85' (o.g.)	Stadium: St James' Park; Attendance: 50,174; Referee: Simon Hooper

4 February 2018 26	Crystal Palace	1–1	Newcastle United	Selhurst
14:15 GMT	Milivojević 55' (pen.); Fosu-Mensah (yellow card) 64'	Report	Diamé 22'; Dummett (yellow card) 57'	Stadium: Selhurst Park; Attendance: 25,746; Referee: Andre Marriner
Note: Live on Sky Sports

11 February 2018 27	Newcastle United	1–0	Manchester United	Newcastle upon Tyne
14:15 GMT	Ritchie 65'	Report	Smalling (yellow card) 64'; Valencia (yellow card) 88'	Stadium: St James' Park; Attendance: 52,309; Referee: Craig Pawson
Note: Live on Sky Sports

24 February 2018 28	AFC Bournemouth	2–2	Newcastle United	Bournemouth
15:00 GMT	Aké (yellow card) 52'; Smith 80'; Gosling 89'	Report	Gayle 17', 45+1'; Ritchie (yellow card) 53'; Yedlin (yellow card) 82'; Diamé (yellow card) 85'; Ayoze (yellow card) 90+1'	Stadium: Vitality Stadium; Attendance: 10,808; Referee: Roger East

3 March 2018 29	Liverpool	2–0	Newcastle United	Liverpool
17:30 GMT	Salah 40'; Mané 55'	Report		Stadium: Anfield; Attendance: 53,287; Referee: Graham Scott
Note: Live on BT Sport

10 March 2018 30	Newcastle United	3–0	Southampton	Newcastle upon Tyne
15:00 GMT	Kenedy 2', 29'; Ritchie 57'	Report	Hoedt (yellow card) 48'; Stephens (yellow card) 69'	Stadium: St James' Park; Attendance: 52,246; Referee: Andre Marriner

31 March 2018 31	Newcastle United	1–0	Huddersfield Town	Newcastle upon Tyne
15:00 BST	Lascelles (yellow card) 8'; Ayoze 80'	Report	Mooy (yellow card) 6'; Hogg (yellow card) 28'; Schindler (yellow card) 60'; Quaner (yellow card) 84'	Stadium: St James' Park; Attendance: 52,261; Referee: Martin Atkinson

7 April 2018 32	Leicester City	1–2	Newcastle United	Leicester
15:00 BST	Maguire (yellow card) 21'; Vardy 83'	Report	Shelvey 18'; Lascelles (yellow card) 21'; Gayle (yellow card) 52'; Ritchie (yellow card) 55'; Ayoze 75'	Stadium: King Power Stadium; Attendance: 32,066; Referee: Stuart Attwell

15 April 2018 33	Newcastle United	2–1	Arsenal	Newcastle upon Tyne
13:30 BST	Ayoze 29'; Ritchie 68'; Slimani (yellow card) 90+1'	Report	Lacazette 14'	Stadium: St James' Park; Attendance: 52,210; Referee: Anthony Taylor
Note: Live on Sky Sports

23 April 2018 34	Everton	1–0	Newcastle United	Liverpool
20:00 BST	Walcott 51'; Keane (yellow card) 75'; Gueye (yellow card) 90+1'	Report	Kenedy (yellow card) 90+1'	Stadium: Goodison Park; Attendance: 39,061; Referee: Bobby Madley
Note: Live on Sky Sports

28 April 2018 35	Newcastle United	0–1	West Bromwich Albion	Newcastle upon Tyne
15:00 BST	Diamé (yellow card) 68'	Report	Phillips 29'; Livermore (yellow card) 37'; Nyom (yellow card) 45+1'; McClean (yellow card) 82'	Stadium: St James' Park; Attendance: 52,283; Referee: David Coote

5 May 2018 36	Watford	2–1	Newcastle United	Watford
15:00 BST	Pereyra 2'; Gray 28'; Deeney (penalty missed) 39'; Kabasele (yellow card) 58'; Holebas (yellow card) 72'	Report	Ayoze (yellow card) 42', (goal) 55'	Stadium: Vicarage Road; Attendance: 20,375; Referee: Roger East

9 May 2018 37	Tottenham Hotspur	1–0	Newcastle United	Wembley
20:00 BST	Kane 50'; Alli (yellow card) 57'; Lamela (yellow card) 89'	Report	Ritchie (yellow card) 73'; Diamé (yellow card) 80'; Yedlin (yellow card) 90+2'	Stadium: Wembley Stadium; Attendance: 54,923; Referee: Neil Swarbrick

13 May 2018 38	Newcastle United	3–0	Chelsea	Newcastle upon Tyne
15:00 BST	Gayle 23'; Pérez 59', 63'	Report	Bakayoko (yellow card) 62'	Stadium: St James' Park; Attendance: 52,294; Referee: Martin Atkinson
Note: Live on Sky Sports

=== EFL Cup ===
Newcastle United entered the EFL Cup in the second round and were drawn at home against Nottingham Forest.

23 August 2017 Second round	Newcastle United	2–3 (a.e.t.)	Nottingham Forest	Newcastle upon Tyne
19:45 BST	Mitrović 3'; Aarons 45+1'; Hanley (yellow card) 85'	Report	Cummings 29', 31'; Worrall (yellow card) 83'; Walker 97'; Mancienne (yellow card) 111'	Stadium: St James' Park; Attendance: 27,709; Referee: Darren England

=== FA Cup ===
Newcastle United entered the FA Cup in the third round and were drawn at home to Luton Town. Newcastle United then progressed into the fourth round and were drawn away to Chelsea.

6 January 2018 Third round	Newcastle United	3–1	Luton Town	Newcastle upon Tyne
15:00 GMT	Ayoze 30', 36'; Shelvey 39', (yellow card) 62'; Dummett (yellow card) 59'; Hayden (yellow card) 67'	Report	Hylton (yellow card) 29', (goal) 49'	Stadium: St James' Park; Attendance: 47,069; Referee: Neil Swarbrick

28 January 2018 Fourth round	Chelsea	3–0	Newcastle United	Fulham
13:30	Batshuayi 31', 44'; Alonso 72'	Report	Mbemba (yellow card) 17'	Stadium: Stamford Bridge; Attendance: 41,049; Referee: Kevin Friend
Note: Live on BT Sport

== Statistics ==
=== Appearances and goals ===
Last updated on 13 May 2018.

No.	Pos	Nat	Player	Total		Premier League		EFL Cup		FA Cup	
No.	Pos	Nat	Player	Apps	Goals	Apps	Goals	Apps	Goals	Apps	Goals
Goalkeepers
1	GK	(Republic of Ireland) IRL	Rob Elliot	16	0	16	0	0	0	0	0
12	GK	(Slovakia) SVK	Martin Dúbravka	12	0	12	0	0	0	0	0
26	GK	(England) ENG	Karl Darlow	12	0	10	0	1	0	1	0
Defenders
2	DF	(Republic of Ireland) IRL	Ciaran Clark	22	2	19+1	2	0	0	2	0
3	DF	(Wales) WAL	Paul Dummett	21	0	19+1	0	0	0	1	0
6	DF	(England) ENG	Jamaal Lascelles	35	3	32+1	3	0	0	2	0
18	DF	(Democratic Republic of the Congo) COD	Chancel Mbemba	11	0	7+2	0	1	0	1	0
19	DF	(Spain) ESP	Javier Manquillo	23	0	20+1	0	0	0	2	0
20	DF	(France) FRA	Florian Lejeune	24	0	24	0	0	0	0	0
22	DF	(United States) USA	DeAndre Yedlin	34	0	31+3	0	0	0	0	0
25	DF	(France) FRA	Massadio Haïdara	2	0	0+1	0	0	0	1	0
27	DF	(Spain) ESP	Jesús Gámez	3	0	1+1	0	1	0	0	0
Midfielders
7	MF	(England) ENG	Jacob Murphy	28	1	13+12	1	1	0	1+1	0
8	MF	(England) ENG	Jonjo Shelvey	32	2	25+5	1	0	0	2	1
10	MF	(Senegal) SEN	Mohamed Diamé	33	2	23+8	2	1	0	0+1	0
11	MF	(Scotland) SCO	Matt Ritchie	38	3	32+3	3	0+1	0	2	0
14	MF	(England) ENG	Isaac Hayden	29	1	15+11	1	0+1	0	1+1	0
15	MF	(Brazil) BRA	Kenedy	13	2	13	2	0	0	0	0
23	MF	(Spain) ESP	Mikel Merino	25	1	14+10	1	0	0	1	0
30	MF	(Ghana) GHA	Christian Atsu	29	2	19+9	2	0	0	0+1	0
Forwards
9	FW	(England) ENG	Dwight Gayle	37	6	23+12	6	0	0	2	0
13	FW	(Algeria) ALG	Islam Slimani	4	0	1+3	0	0	0	0	0
17	FW	(Spain) ESP	Ayoze Pérez	37	10	28+8	8	0	0	1	2
21	FW	(Spain) ESP	Joselu	32	4	19+11	4	0+1	0	0+1	0
Player(s) who left on loan but featured this season
4	MF	(England) ENG	Jack Colback	0	0	0	0	0	0	0	0
16	MF	(England) ENG	Rolando Aarons	5	1	1+3	0	1	1	0	0
24	MF	(Senegal) SEN	Henri Saivet	4	1	1	1	1	0	1+1	0
33	DF	(Morocco) MAR	Achraf Lazaar	1	0	0	0	0+1	0	0	0
35	MF	(England) ENG	Daniel Barlaser	1	0	0	0	1	0	0	0
41	GK	(England) ENG	Freddie Woodman	1	0	0	0	0	0	1	0
42	DF	(England) ENG	Jamie Sterry	1	0	0	0	1	0	0	0
45	FW	(Serbia) SRB	Aleksandar Mitrović	7	2	0+6	1	1	1	0	0
Player(s) who left permanently but featured this season
5	DF	(Scotland) SCO	Grant Hanley	1	0	0	0	1	0	0	0

=== Cards ===
Accounts for all competitions. Last updated on 5 May 2018.

No.	Pos.	Name	Yellow card	Red card
2	DF	(Republic of Ireland) Ciaran Clark	3	0
3	DF	(Wales) Paul Dummett	2	0
5	DF	(Scotland) Grant Hanley (Note: Hanley left the club in the Summer Transfer Window.)	1	0
6	DF	(England) Jamaal Lascelles	5	0
8	MF	(England) Jonjo Shelvey	3	2
9	FW	(England) Dwight Gayle	3	0
10	MF	(Senegal) Mohamed Diamé	2	0
11	MF	(Scotland) Matt Ritchie	5	0
13	FW	(Algeria) Islam Slimani	2 (Note: Slimani got 1 yellow card whilst he played for Leicester City before he joined the club.)	0
14	MF	(England) Isaac Hayden	8	0
15	MF	(Brazil) Kenedy	1	0
17	FW	(Spain) Ayoze Pérez	3	0
18	DF	(Democratic Republic of the Congo) Chancel Mbemba	1	0
19	DF	(Spain) Javier Manquillo	2	0
20	DF	(France) Florian Lejeune	3	0
21	FW	(Spain) Joselu	2	0
22	DF	(United States) DeAndre Yedlin	4	0
23	MF	(Spain) Mikel Merino	4	0
30	MF	(Ghana) Christian Atsu	1	0

=== Goals ===
Last updated on 13 May 2018.

Place	Position	Number	Nation	Name	Premier League	EFL Cup	FA Cup	Total
1	FW	17	(Spain)	Ayoze Pérez	8	0	2	10
2	FW	9	(England)	Dwight Gayle	6	0	0	6
3	FW	21	(Spain)	Joselu	4	0	0	4
4	DF	6	(England)	Jamaal Lascelles	3	0	0	3
4	MF	11	(Scotland)	Matt Ritchie	3	0	0	3
6	DF	2	(Republic of Ireland)	Ciaran Clark	2	0	0	2
6	MF	8	(England)	Jonjo Shelvey	1	0	1	2
6	MF	10	(Senegal)	Mohamed Diamé	2	0	0	2
6	MF	15	(Brazil)	Kenedy	2	0	0	2
6	MF	30	(Ghana)	Christian Atsu	2	0	0	2
6	FW	45	(Serbia)	Aleksandar Mitrović (Note: Mitrović left the club in the Winter Transfer Window.)	1	1	0	2
12	MF	7	(England)	Jacob Murphy	1	0	0	1
12	MF	14	(England)	Isaac Hayden	1	0	0	1
12	MF	16	(England)	Rolando Aarons (Note: Aarons left the club in the Winter Transfer Window.)	0	1	0	1
12	MF	23	(Spain)	Mikel Merino	1	0	0	1
12	MF	24	(Senegal)	Henri Saivet (Note: Saivet left the club in the Winter Transfer Window.)	1	0	0	1
12	Own Goals				1	0	0	1
TOTALS					39	2	3	43

=== Clean sheets ===
Last updated on 13 May 2018.

Place	Number	Nation	Name	Matches Played	Premier League	EFL Cup	FA Cup	Total
1	12	(Slovakia)	Martin Dúbravka	12	4	0	0	4
2	1	(Republic of Ireland)	Rob Elliot	16	3	0	0	3
3	26	(England)	Karl Darlow	12	2	0	0	2
4	41	(England)	Freddie Woodman (Note: Woodman left the club in the Winter Transfer Window.)	1	0	0	0	0
TOTALS					9	0	0	9
