= Karl Darlow =

Wales international footballer (born 1990)

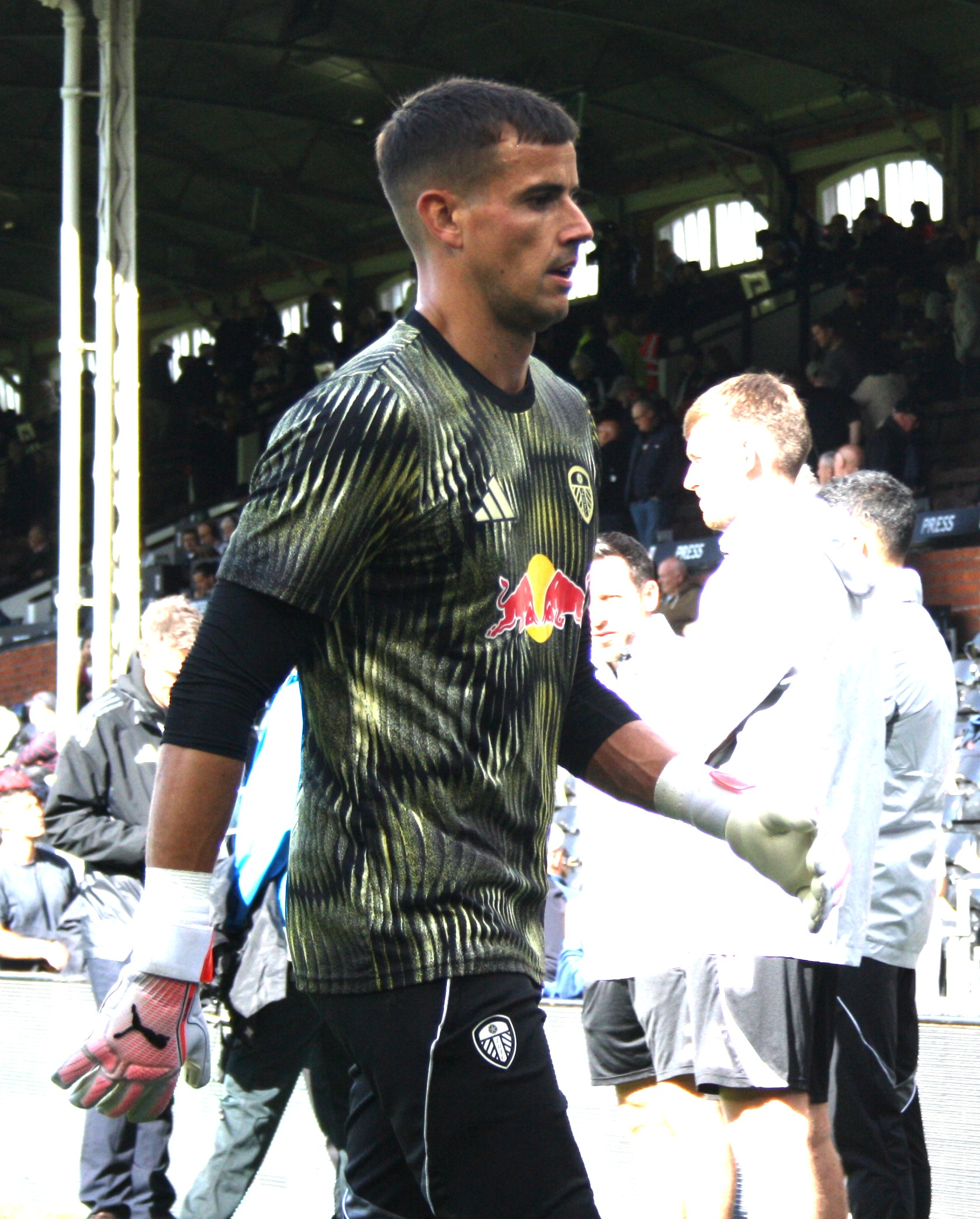
- Darlow with Leeds United in 2025

Personal information
- Full name: Karl Darlow
- Date of birth: 8 October 1990 (age 36)
- Place of birth: Northampton, England
- Height: 1.90 m (6 ft 3 in)
- Position: Goalkeeper

Team information
- Current team: Manchester United
- Number: 12

Youth career
- Aston Villa
- –2010: Nottingham Forest

Senior career*
Years	Team	Apps	(Gls)
2010–2014	Nottingham Forest	64	(0)
2012	→ Newport County (loan)	8	(0)
2012	→ Walsall (loan)	7	(0)
2013	→ Walsall (loan)	2	(0)
2014–2023	Newcastle United	86	(0)
2014–2015	→ Nottingham Forest (loan)	42	(0)
2023	→ Hull City (loan)	12	(0)
2023–2026	Leeds United	31	(0)
2026–	Manchester United	0	(0)

International career^{‡}
2024–	Wales	16	(0)
- * Club domestic league appearances and goals as of 23:18, 24 May 2026 (UTC) ‡ National team caps and goals as of 19:12, 14 November 2026 (UTC)

Karl Darlow (born 8 October 1990) is a professional footballer who plays as a goalkeeper for Premier League club Manchester United and the Wales national team.

Darlow is a product of both the Aston Villa and Nottingham Forest academies and was promoted to Nottingham Forest's first team in 2010. After spending four seasons with Forest, Darlow signed for Newcastle United in August 2014, and was immediately sent back on loan to Forest for the remainder of that season. During his tenure with Forest, he had also spent time on loan with both Newport County and Walsall earlier in his career. Having had a nine-year career with Newcastle, Darlow permanently joined fellow English club Leeds United in July 2023, but had been dropped in favor of Illan Meslier for most of his career with the club, before momentarily earning a first-place spot with the club in mid-2025. He joined Manchester United in July 2026, shortly after his contract with Leeds expired.

Born in England, Darlow is the grandson of former Wales international forward Ken Leek, who was included in the Welsh 1958 World Cup squad, and was subsequently eligible to represent both England and Wales internationally. Despite wanting to play for England, he was not selected to play for any of England's international teams. In September 2024, he switched his allegiance to Wales, earning his first call-up to the Wales squad, and making his senior international debut.

== Club career ==
=== Nottingham Forest ===
Weeks after being released by Aston Villa at the age of 16, Villa goalkeeping coach Eric Steele recommended Darlow to Nottingham Forest and he was signed up in their academy. After impressive displays in the reserve team, Darlow was awarded a space on the bench where he was present for the majority of the 2010–11 season. His debut was against Crystal Palace, on the last day of the 2010–11 season, as a substitute for Lee Camp. The Reds won the game 3–0, a result that secured them a play-off spot.

==== Loan to Newport County ====
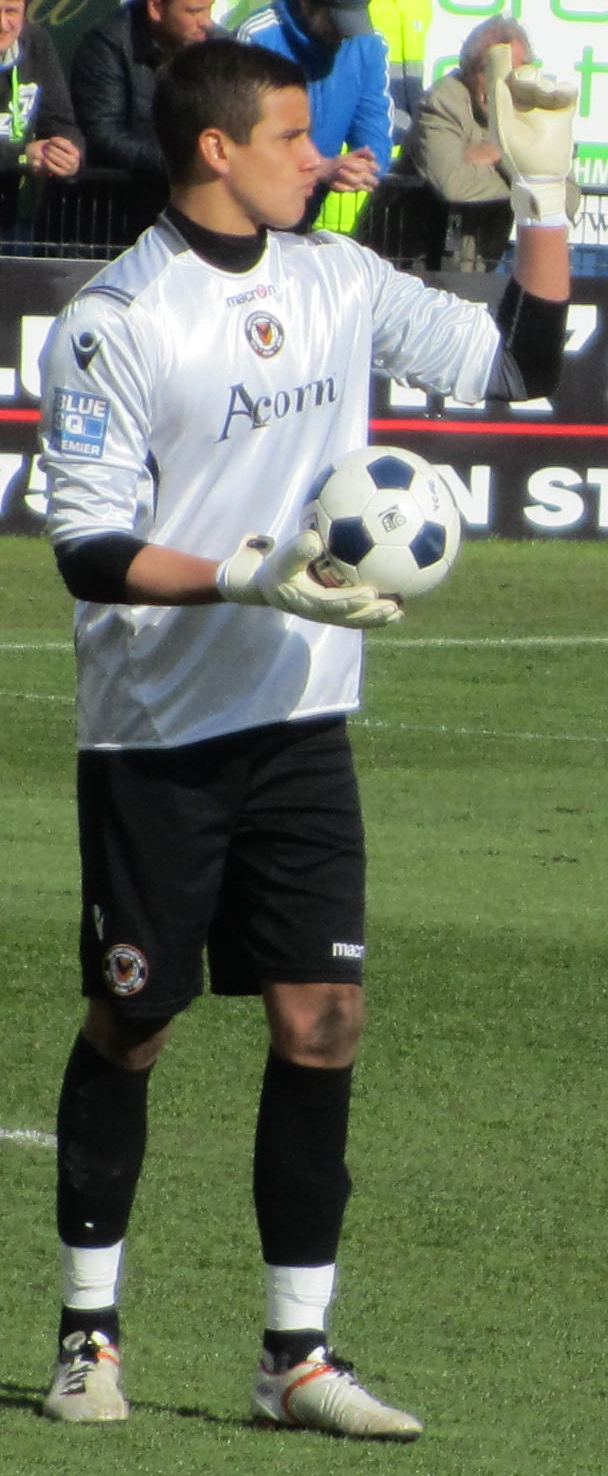
Darlow playing for Newport County in 2012

In March 2012, Darlow joined Conference National club Newport County on loan for a month. He made his first appearance for the club in a 1–0 home win against Gateshead.

==== Loan to Walsall ====
On 21 September 2012, Darlow joined Walsall on loan for one month. While there, he signed a new three-year contract at parent club Forest, keeping him there until 2015. On 22 October, his loan with Walsall was extended until 22 December 2012, but Forest recalled him four days later to cover for injured Forest goalkeeper Dimitar Evtimov.

On 1 January 2013, Darlow rejoined Walsall on a one-month loan deal, with an option of extending the loan for the remainder of the season. However, he was recalled to Forest yet again on 10 January, after first choice Lee Camp had been told he could leave the club on a free transfer.

==== Return to Forest ====
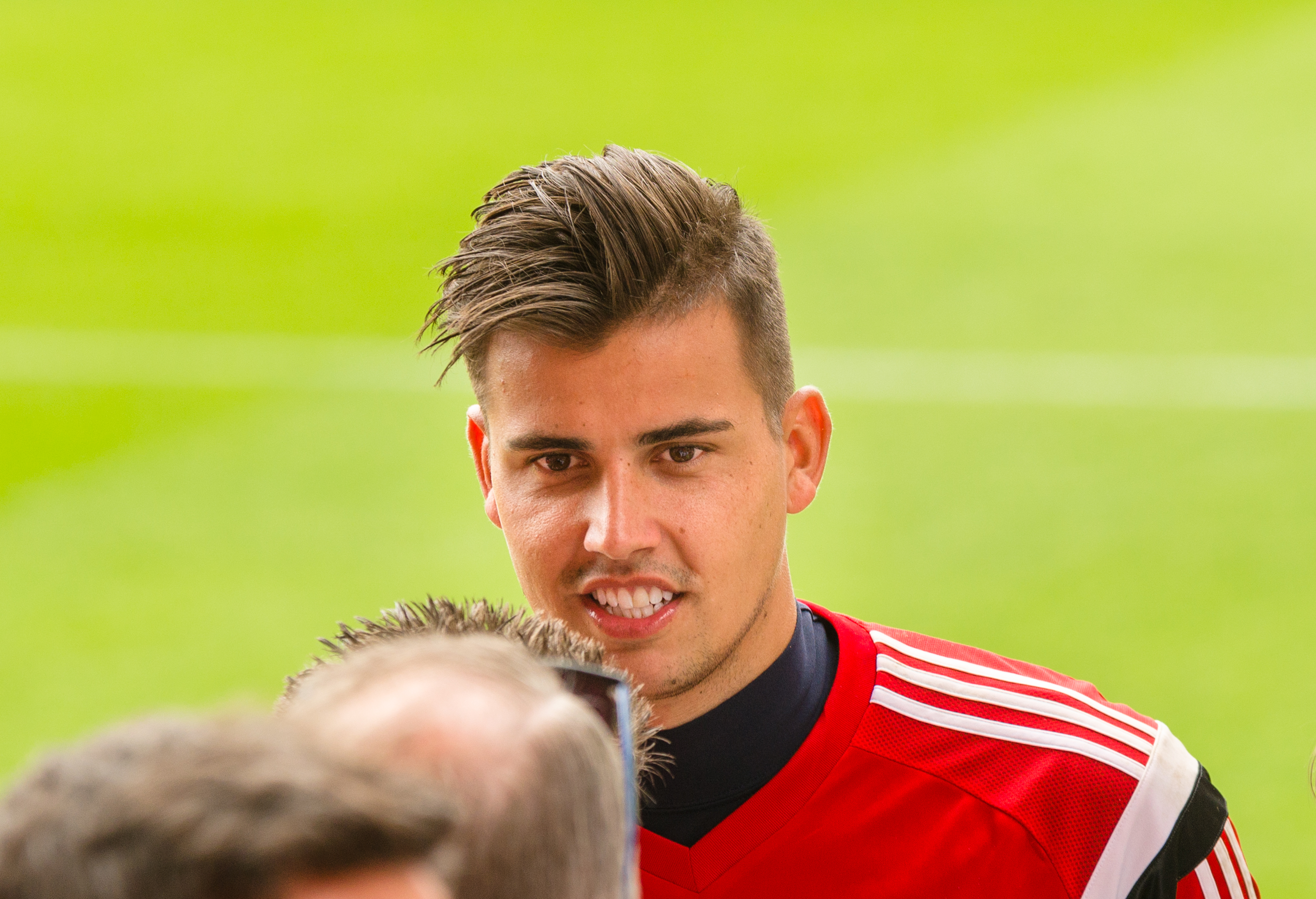
Darlow with Nottingham Forest in 2014

On 12 January 2013, he made his full Forest league debut in their 2–1 win over Peterborough United, and ended the 2012–13 season with 20 league appearances for the club. Darlow signed a new four-year contract on 23 August 2013 and established himself as manager Billy Davies' first-choice goalkeeper, despite the summer arrival of Dorus de Vries.

On 9 August 2014, Darlow signed a long-term contract with Premier League club Newcastle United for an undisclosed fee. As part of the deal, he and teammate Jamaal Lascelles were immediately loaned back to Forest for the 2014–15 season.

=== Newcastle United ===
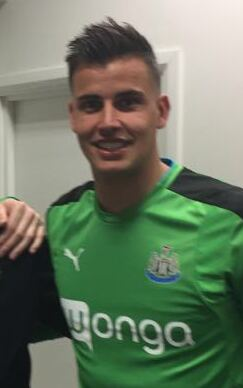
Darlow with Newcastle United in 2017

He made his debut for Premier League club Newcastle United on 25 August 2015, in a League Cup fixture against Northampton Town, which Newcastle won 4–1. He made his Premier League debut on 28 December against West Bromwich Albion as a late inclusion, after regular keeper Rob Elliot was forced to pull out due to illness; the Magpies lost the game 1–0 after Darlow let Darren Fletcher's header slip through his hands. Following a season-ending injury to Elliot while away on international duty, Darlow was forced to take over in net for Newcastle's final eight matches as they attempted to avoid relegation. On 30 April 2016, Darlow saved a penalty from Yohan Cabaye, in a 1–0 Premier League win against Crystal Palace. although Newcastle were relegated on 11 May following a victory for rivals Sunderland over Everton.

Darlow entered the 2016–17 season in competition with summer signing Matz Sels to start the Championship season in goal, which Darlow lost. Darlow played in Newcastle's first two League Cup matches against Cheltenham Town and Wolverhampton Wanderers, keeping clean sheets in both. On 28 September 2017, Darlow received his first Championship start of the season, replacing Sels against Norwich City in a 4–3 win. He became the club's first-choice goalkeeper under Rafael Benítez, ahead of Elliot, Sels and Freddie Woodman. Darlow made 34 appearances, keeping 13 clean sheets in the 2016–17 season, as Newcastle were promoted to the Premier League as winners of the Championship. Darlow would compete with Elliot during the 2017–18 season as first-choice goalkeeper in the Premier League, with Darlow making 12 appearances, however, both lost their place in the team when Martin Dúbravka was signed on loan in January 2018.

After starting the 2018–19 season as second choice behind Dúbravka, Darlow made his first and only appearance of that season in the EFL Cup on 29 August 2018, when he started in an 3–1 defeat against his former club Nottingham Forest. On 11 September 2020, he signed a five-year extension to his contract that would keep him at the club until June 2025.

==== Loan to Hull City ====
On 31 January 2023, Darlow joined Championship club Hull City on loan for the remainder of the 2022–23 season. The terms of his loan meant that Darlow could not be recalled, despite Newcastle facing a goalkeeping shortage ahead of the 2023 EFL Cup final on 26 February. He made his debut for Hull on 25 February, in a 1–0 away loss to Bristol City.

=== Leeds United ===
On 29 July 2023, Darlow joined Championship club Leeds United on a three-year deal for an undisclosed fee. He made his first appearance for the club on 9 August in their 2–1 EFL Cup victory over Shrewsbury Town.

On 5 April 2025, against Luton Town, Darlow started for Leeds in a 1–1 draw, replacing Illan Meslier as first-choice goalkeeper. He went on to start all of Leeds' remaining games in their successful promotion back to the Premier League, and he was praised for his performances.

On 21 March 2026, Darlow recorded back-to-back clean sheets for Leeds in a 0–0 draw against Brentford in the Premier League. It was the first time he made back-to-back clean sheets in a Premier League season since 2017–18 with Newcastle. In July 2026, it was reported he left Leeds as a free agent when his contract expired on 30 June.

=== Manchester United ===
On 14 July 2026, Darlow signed for Manchester United on a free transfer, signing a two-year contract. He made his debut on 16 September 2026 in a 3–2 League Cup defeat to Brighton & Hove Albion at Old Trafford.

== International career ==
In addition to England, Darlow was eligible to represent Wales as his grandfather Ken Leek, a former Wales international forward, was born in Ynysybwl. The Football Association of Wales confirmed Darlow had declined an invitation to be included in the Welsh squad for a friendly match against Austria on 6 February 2013.

Then-Wales manager Ryan Giggs approached Darlow in March 2018 to be included in the Wales squad. Darlow advised he was currently concentrating on winning back his place in the Newcastle starting line-up. In November 2020, Darlow stated his ambition to play for England, saying: "It's the one thing that as a child you want to do" and "[He] would love nothing more". However in September 2024, Darlow was called up to the Wales senior squad for the first time for the UEFA Nations League matches against Turkey and Montenegro. He made his debut for Wales on 9 September 2024, starting in the 2–1 win against Montenegro.

== Career statistics ==
=== Club ===
As of match played 16 September 2026

Appearances and goals by club, season and competition
Club	Season	League			FA Cup		League Cup		Other		Total	
Club	Season	Division	Apps	Goals	Apps	Goals	Apps	Goals	Apps	Goals	Apps	Goals
Nottingham Forest	2010–11	Championship	1	0	0	0	0	0	0	0	1	0
Nottingham Forest	2012–13	Championship	20	0	0	0	1	0	—		21	0
Nottingham Forest	2013–14	Championship	43	0	2	0	0	0	—		45	0
Nottingham Forest	2014–15	Championship	42	0	0	0	2	0	—		44	0
Nottingham Forest	Total		106	0	2	0	3	0	0	0	111	0
Newport County (loan)	2011–12	Conference Premier	8	0	—		—		0	0	8	0
Walsall (loan)	2012–13	League One	9	0	0	0	—		1 (Note: Appearance in Football League Trophy)	0	10	0
Newcastle United	2015–16	Premier League	9	0	0	0	1	0	—		10	0
Newcastle United	2016–17	Championship	34	0	0	0	2	0	—		36	0
Newcastle United	2017–18	Premier League	10	0	1	0	1	0	—		12	0
Newcastle United	2018–19	Premier League	0	0	0	0	1	0	—		1	0
Newcastle United	2019–20	Premier League	0	0	5	0	1	0	—		6	0
Newcastle United	2020–21	Premier League	25	0	0	0	1	0	—		26	0
Newcastle United	2021–22	Premier League	8	0	0	0	0	0	—		8	0
Newcastle United	2022–23	Premier League	0	0	0	0	1	0	—		1	0
Newcastle United	Total		86	0	6	0	8	0	—		100	0
Hull City (loan)	2022–23	Championship	12	0	—		—		—		12	0
Leeds United	2023–24	Championship	2	0	0	0	2	0	—		4	0
Leeds United	2024–25	Championship	7	0	2	0	1	0	—		10	0
Leeds United	2025–26	Premier League	22	0	1	0	1	0	—		24	0
Leeds United	Total		31	0	3	0	4	0	—		38	0
Manchester United	2026–27	Premier League	0	0	0	0	1	0	0	0	1	0
Career total			252	0	11	0	16	0	1	0	280	0

=== International ===
As of match played 14 November 2026

Appearances and goals by national team and year
National team	Year	Apps	Goals
Wales	2024	3	0
Wales	2025	9	0
Wales	2026	4	0
Total		16	0

== Honours ==
Newcastle United

- EFL Championship: 2016–17

Leeds United

- EFL Championship: 2024–25

Individual

- Premier League Save of the Month: April 2026
