= List of English football transfers winter 2017–18 =

The 2017–18 winter transfer window for English football transfers opened on 1 January and closed on 1 February 2018. Additionally, players without a club could join at any time, clubs could sign players on loan at any time, and clubs could sign a goalkeeper on an emergency loan if they had no registered goalkeeper available. This list includes transfers featuring at least one Premier League or Championship club which were completed after the end of the summer 2017 transfer window and before the end of the 2017–18 winter window.

== Transfers ==
Date	Player	Moving from	Moving to	Fee
31 August 2017^{[a]}	(Portugal) Adrien Silva	(Portugal) Sporting CP	Leicester City	£22m
6 September 2017^{[a]}	(Sweden) Viktor Gyökeres	(Sweden) Brommapojkarna	Brighton & Hove Albion	Undisclosed
8 September 2017	(Netherlands) Vincent Janssen	Tottenham Hotspur	(Turkey) Fenerbahçe	Loan
21 September 2017	(Denmark) Anders Lindegaard	Unattached	Burnley	Free
21 September 2017^{[a]}	(Spain) Diego Costa	Chelsea	(Spain) Atlético Madrid	£50m
27 December 2017^{[a]}	(Netherlands) Virgil van Dijk	Southampton	Liverpool	£75m
29 December 2017	(England) Fraser Horsfall	Huddersfield Town	Kidderminster	Undisclosed
1 January 2018	(England) Louis Moult	(Scotland) Motherwell	Preston	£500,000
2 January 2018	(Netherlands) Terence Kongolo	(France) Monaco	Huddersfield Town	Loan
2 January 2018	(England) Danny Rowe	Ipswich Town	Lincoln City	Loan
3 January 2018	(England) Stephy Mavididi	Arsenal	Charlton Athletic	Loan
3 January 2018	(England) Jordan Maguire-Drew	Brighton & Hove Albion	Coventry	Loan
3 January 2018	(England) Billy Bodin	Bristol Rovers	Preston	Undisclosed
3 January 2018	(France) Sylvain Deslandes	Wolverhampton Wanderers	Portsmouth	Loan
3 January 2018	(Republic of Ireland) Connor Ronan	Wolverhampton Wanderers	Portsmouth	Loan
3 January 2018	(Democratic Republic of the Congo) Yeni N'Gbakoto	Queens Park Rangers	(France) Guingamp	Undisclosed
3 January 2018	(England) James Hanson	Sheffield United	Bury	Loan
3 January 2018	(Spain) Rafa Mir	(Spain) Valencia	Wolverhampton Wanderers	Undisclosed
4 January 2018	(England) Robert Dickie	Reading	Oxford United	Undisclosed
4 January 2018	(Greece) Konstantinos Mavropanos	(Greece) PAS Giannina	Arsenal	Undisclosed
4 January 2018	(England) Ike Ugbo	Chelsea	Milton Keynes Dons	Loan
5 January 2018	(England) Shay Facey	Manchester City	Northampton Town	Undisclosed
5 January 2018	(England) Corey Whelan	Liverpool	Yeovil Town	Loan
5 January 2018	(England) Brandon Mason	Watford	(Scotland) Dundee United	Loan
5 January 2018	(England) Aaron Ramsdale	Bournemouth	Chesterfield	Loan
5 January 2018	(England) Ross Barkley	Everton	Chelsea	£15m
5 January 2018	(England) Jake Kean	Sheffield Wednesday	Grimsby Town	Loan
5 January 2018	(Turkey) Cenk Tosun	(Turkey) Beşiktaş	Everton	£27m
7 January 2018
7 January 2018	(Belgium) Kevin Mirallas	Everton	(Greece) Olympiacos	Loan
8 January 2018	(Brazil) Philippe Coutinho	Liverpool	(Spain) Barcelona	£142m
8 January 2018	(England) Jake Clarke-Salter	Chelsea	Sunderland	Loan
8 January 2018	(France) Georges-Kévin Nkoudou	Tottenham Hotspur	Burnley	Loan
9 January 2018
9 January 2018	(Austria) Moritz Bauer	(Russia) Rubin Kazan	Stoke City	Undisclosed
10 January 2018	(England) Lee Evans	Wolverhampton Wanderers	Sheffield United	£750,000
10 January 2018	(England) James Wilson	Manchester United	Sheffield United	Loan
11 January 2018	(France) Francis Coquelin	Arsenal	(Spain) Valencia	€14m
11 January 2018	(England) Cameron Brannagan	Liverpool	Oxford United	Undisclosed
11 January 2018	(Belgium) Laurens De Bock	(Belgium) Club Brugge	Leeds United	Undisclosed
11 January 2018	(Republic of Ireland) Lee Frecklington	Rotherham United	Lincoln City	Undisclosed
11 January 2018	(Republic of Ireland) Paul Green	Oldham United	Crewe Alexandra	Loan
11 January 2018	(England) Ben Whiteman	Oldham United	Doncaster Rovers	Undisclossed
11 January 2018	(England) Donovan Wilson	Wolverhampton Wanderers	Port Vale	Loan
11 January 2018	(England) Ryan Yates	Nottingham Forest	Scunthorpe United	Loan
12 January 2018	(England) Alex Pritchard	Norwich City	Huddersfield Town	Undisclosed
12 January 2018	(Afghanistan) Noor Husin	Crystal Palace	Notts County	Undisclosed
12 January 2018	(Republic of Ireland) Harry Charsley	Everton	Bolton Wanderers	Loan
12 January 2018	(England) Isaac Buckley-Ricketts	Manchester City	Oxford United	Loan
13 January 2018	(Mali) Fousseni Diabaté	(France) Gazélec Ajaccio	Leicester City	Undisclosed
15 January 2018	(England) Marcus Edwards	Tottenham Hotspur	Norwich City	Loan
15 January 2018	(England) Ricky Holmes	Charlton Athletic	Sheffield United	Undisclosed
16 January 2018	(England) Cameron Jerome	Norwich City	Derby County	£1.5m
16 January 2018	(England) Keshi Anderson	Crystal Palace	Swindon Town	Undisclosed
16 January 2018	(England) Kean Bryan	Manchester City	Oldham Athletic	Loan
16 January 2018	(England) Jack Payne	Huddersfield Town	Blackburn Rovers	Loan
17 January 2018	(England) Theo Walcott	Arsenal	Everton	£20m
17 January 2018	(Netherlands) Joey Pelupessy	(Netherlands) Heracles Almelo	Sheffield Wednesday	Undisclosed
17 January 2018	(England) Adam Forshaw	Middlesbrough	Leeds United	£4.5m
17 January 2018	(Romania) Alex Dobre	Bournemouth	Rochdale	Loan
17 January 2018	(England) Dan Agyei	Burnley	Blackpool	Loan
17 January 2018	(Serbia) Marko Grujić	Liverpool	(Wales) Cardiff City	Loan
18 January 2018	(Greece) Kostas Stafylidis	(Germany) FC Augsburg	Stoke City	Loan
18 January 2018	(Netherlands) Jürgen Locadia	(Netherlands) PSV Eindhoven	Brighton & Hove Albion	£14m
18 January 2018	(United States) Gboly Ariyibi	Nottingham Forest	Northampton Town	Loan
18 January 2018	(England) Daniel Barlaser	Newcastle United	Crewe Alexandra	Loan
18 January 2018	(England) Tahvon Campbell	West Bromwich Albion	Forest Green Rovers	Loan
18 January 2018	(United States) Cameron Carter-Vickers	Tottenham Hotspur	Ipswich Town	Loan
18 January 2018	(Republic of Ireland) Stephen Gleeson	Birmingham City	Ipswich Town	Free
18 January 2018	(England) Harry McKirdy	Aston Villa	Crewe Alexandra	Loan
18 January 2018	(England) George Miller	Middlesbrough	Bury	Loan
18 January 2018	(Spain) Daniel Pinillos	(Spain) Córdoba	Barnsley	Undisclosed
22 January 2018	(Chile) Alexis Sánchez	Arsenal	Manchester United	Player Swap
22 January 2018	(Armenia) Henrikh Mkhitaryan	Manchester United	Arsenal	Player Swap
22 January 2018	(Sweden) Erdal Rakip	(Portugal) Benfica	Crystal Palace	Loan
22 January 2018	(England) Ryan Loft	Tottenham Hotspur	Exeter City	Loan
22 January 2018	(Scotland) Kenny McLean	(Scotland) Aberdeen	Norwich City	Undisclosed
22 January 2018	(Scotland) Kenny McLean	Norwich City	(Scotland) Aberdeen	Loan
23 January 2018	(Poland) Jarosław Jach	(Poland) Zagłębie Lubin	Crystal Palace	Undisclosed
23 January 2018	(England) Aaron Lennon	Everton	Burnley	Undisclosed
23 January 2018	(Brazil) Kenedy	Chelsea	Newcastle United	Loan
23 January 2018	(Belgium) Ritchie De Laet	Aston Villa	(Belgium) Royal Antwerp	Loan
25 January 2018	(England) Axel Tuanzebe	Manchester United	Aston Villa	Loan
25 January 2018	(Germany) Onel Hernández	(Germany) Eintracht Braunschweig	Norwich City	Undisclosed
25 January 2018	(Germany) Dennis Srbeny	(Germany) SC Paderborn	Norwich City	Undisclosed
25 January 2018	(France) Loïs Diony	(France) Saint-Étienne	Bristol City	Loan
25 January 2018	(Argentina) Guido Carrillo	(France) Monaco	Southampton	£19m
26 January 2018	(Portugal) João Mário	(Italy) Inter Milan	West Ham United	Loan
26 January 2018	(Haiti) Duckens Nazon	Wolverhampton Wanderers	Oldham Athletic	Loan
26 January 2018	(England) Ben Sheaf	Arsenal	Stevenage	Loan
26 January 2018	(England) Mallik Wilks	Leeds United	Grimsby Town	Loan
27 January 2018	(Republic of Ireland) Shaun Donnellan	West Bromwich Albion	Yeovil Town	Free
29 January 2018	(Romania) Adrian Popa	Reading	(Saudi Arabia) Al-Taawoun	Loan
29 January 2018	(England) Tommy Elphick	Aston Villa	Reading	Loan
29 January 2018	(Argentina) Leonardo Ulloa	Leicester City	Brighton & Hove Albion	Loan
29 January 2018	(England) Daniel Sturridge	Liverpool	West Bromwich Albion	Loan
29 January 2018	(Spain) Gerard Deulofeu	(Spain) Barcelona	Watford	Loan
29 January 2018	(Egypt) Ali Gabr	(Egypt) Zamalek	West Bromwich Albion	Loan
29 January 2018	(England) Luke Amos	Tottenham Hotspur	Stevenage	Loan
29 January 2018	(England) Anton Walkes	Tottenham Hotspur	Portsmouth	Loan
29 January 2018	(Scotland) Adam King	(Wales) Swansea City	Mansfield Town	Loan
29 January 2018	(Northern Ireland) Caolan Lavery	Sheffield United	Rotherham United	Loan
29 January 2018	(England) Connor Mahoney	Bournemouth	Barnsley	Loan
29 January 2018	(England) Boris Mathis	Everton	Northampton Town	Loan
29 January 2018	(England) Ashley Smith-Brown	Manchester City	Oxford United	Loan
29 January 2018	(England) Harry Toffolo	Norwich City	Millwall	Loan
29 January 2018	(England) Aaron Tshibola	Aston Villa	(Scotland) Kilmarnock	Loan
29 January 2018	(Senegal) Diafra Sakho	West Ham United	(France) Rennes	Undisclosed
30 January 2018	(France) Aymeric Laporte	(Spain) Athletic Bilbao	Manchester City	£57m
30 January 2018	(Portugal) Diogo Jota	(Spain) Atlético Madrid	Wolverhampton Wanderers	Undisclosed
30 January 2018	(Nigeria) Ahmed Musa	Leicester City	(Russia) CSKA Moscow	Loan
30 January 2018	(England) Josh Tymon	Stoke City	Milton Keynes Dons	Loan
30 January 2018	(Italy) Emerson	(Italy) Roma	Chelsea	£20m
30 January 2018	(England) Jack Harrison	(United States) New York City FC	Manchester City	Undisclosed
30 January 2018	(England) Jack Harrison	Manchester City	Middlesbrough	Loan
30 January 2018	(Democratic Republic of the Congo) Dodi Lukebakio	(Belgium) Anderlecht	Watford	Undisclosed
30 January 2018	(Spain) Sandro Ramírez	Everton	(Spain) Sevilla	Loan
30 January 2018	(Portugal) Tobias Figueiredo	(Portugal) Sporting CP	Nottingham Forest	Loan
31 January 2018	(Gabon) Pierre-Emerick Aubameyang	(Germany) Borussia Dortmund	Arsenal	£56m
31 January 2018	(England) Ben Marshall	Wolverhampton Wanderers	Millwall	Loan
31 January 2018	(England) Todd Kane	Chelsea	Oxford United	Loan
31 January 2018	(England) Dylan Mottley-Henry	Barnsley	Chesterfield	Loan
31 January 2018	(Republic of Ireland) Olamide Shodipo	Queens Park Rangers	Colchester United	Loan
31 January 2018	(England) Lloyd Jones	Liverpool	Luton Town	Undisclosed
31 January 2018	(England) Stephen Humphrys	Fulham	Rochdale	Loan
31 January 2018	(Wales) George Williams	Fulham	(Scotland) St Johnstone	Loan
31 January 2018	(Wales) Tyler Roberts	West Bromwich Albion	Leeds United	£2.5m
31 January 2018	(England) Kyle Howkins	West Bromwich Albion	Port Vale	Loan
31 January 2018	(Northern Ireland) Ben Hall	Brighton & Hove Albion	Notts County	Loan
31 January 2018	(England) Tom Anderson	Burnley	Doncaster Rovers	Loan
31 January 2018	(England) Matt Penney	Sheffield Wednesday	Mansfield Town	Loan
31 January 2018	(Italy) Tino Sardinha	(Italy) Lecce	Stoke City	Undisclosed
31 January 2018	(France) Olivier Giroud	Arsenal	Chelsea	Undisclosed
31 January 2018	(Belgium) Michy Batshuayi	Chelsea	(Germany) Borussia Dortmund	Loan
31 January 2018	(England) Freddie Woodman	Newcastle United	(Scotland) Aberdeen	Loan
31 January 2018	(Brazil) Lucas Moura	(France) Paris Saint-Germain	Tottenham Hotspur	£25m
31 January 2018	(England) Ademola Lookman	Everton	(Germany) RB Leipzig	Loan
31 January 2018	(France) Eliaquim Mangala	Manchester City	Everton	Loan
31 January 2018	(Ghana) André Ayew	West Ham United	(Wales) Swansea City	£20m
31 January 2018	(Wales) Andy King	Leicester City	(Wales) Swansea City	Loan
31 January 2018	(England) Lewis Grabban	Bournemouth	Aston Villa	Loan

^{a} Player officially joined his club on 1 January 2018.
