= Freddie Woodman =

English footballer (born 1997)

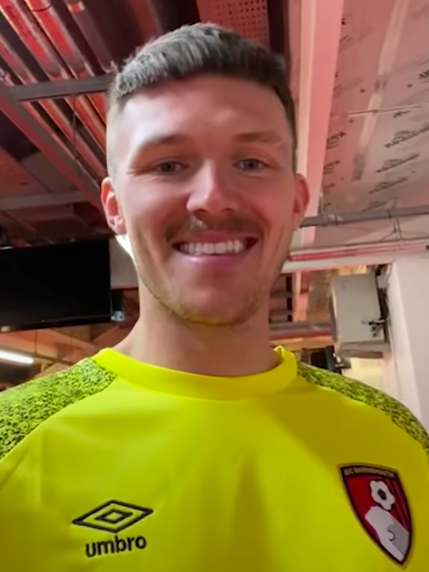
- Woodman upon signing for Bournemouth in 2022

Personal information
- Full name: Frederick John Woodman
- Date of birth: 4 March 1997 (age 29)
- Place of birth: Croydon, Greater London, England
- Height: 6 ft 2 in (1.88 m)
- Position: Goalkeeper

Team information
- Current team: Liverpool
- Number: 28

Youth career
- 2002–2013: Crystal Palace
- 2013–2014: Newcastle United

Senior career*
Years	Team	Apps	(Gls)
2014–2022	Newcastle United	4	(0)
2014	→ Hartlepool United (loan)	0	(0)
2015	→ Crawley Town (loan)	11	(0)
2017	→ Kilmarnock (loan)	14	(0)
2018	→ Aberdeen (loan)	5	(0)
2019–2021	→ Swansea City (loan)	88	(0)
2022	→ Bournemouth (loan)	0	(0)
2022–2025	Preston North End	127	(0)
2025–	Liverpool	3	(0)

International career
2012–2013	England U16	2	(0)
2012–2014	England U17	16	(0)
2014–2015	England U18	6	(0)
2014–2016	England U19	16	(0)
2016–2017	England U20	10	(0)
2016–2018	England U21	6	(0)
Medal record
Men's football
Representing England
FIFA U-20 World Cup
Winner	2017
- * Club domestic league appearances and goals as of 3 May 2026 (UTC)

Frederick John Woodman (born 4 March 1997) is an English professional footballer who plays as a goalkeeper for Premier League club Liverpool.

Woodman started his career at Crystal Palace before moving to the academy setup at Newcastle United in 2013. He made his Newcastle debut on 6 January 2018 and has had other spells on loan to Hartlepool United, Crawley Town, Kilmarnock and Aberdeen.

Woodman has represented England up to U21 level, and has won the 2014 UEFA European Under-17 Championship and the 2017 FIFA U-20 World Cup with his country. He received the Golden Glove award for best goalkeeper in the latter tournament.

== Early life ==
Woodman was born in Croydon, Greater London, and joined the Crystal Palace academy at the age of 14. He had been selected for the academy after being recommended by one of the coaches, who also taught at Woodman's secondary school. Woodman was already a Crystal Palace fan, having attended matches with his grandfather and also acted as both ball-boy and mascot during his youth.

== Club career ==
=== Early career ===
In 2013, Woodman left the Crystal Palace academy and joined Newcastle United, where his father Andy was goalkeeping coach at the time.

=== Loans to Hartlepool United and Crawley Town ===
On 16 September 2014, Woodman was sent on a month-long loan to Hartlepool United to gain experience of being in a first team environment. After six appearances as an unused substitute, Woodman returned to Newcastle.

On 29 July 2015, Woodman was sent on another loan spell to Crawley Town for half of the 2015–16 season. He made his debut for the team on 8 August 2015 in a 1–1 draw against Oxford United. When asked about his loan spell, Woodman said: "I'm really looking forward to it. It's a massive difference and it takes some getting used to, I'll take this experience back with me and say let's not come back here, let's play in the Premier League". Crawley manager Mark Yates said: "We are delighted to have been able to bring one of the best young goalkeepers in the country to the club. The only thing Freddie lacks at the moment is experience in League football and that is what this loan spell with give him. He has all the attributes to become a top-class keeper and I have to thank Steve McClaren, Andy Woodman and everyone at Newcastle for letting us have Freddie for the first half of the season". In October 2015, Newcastle recalled Woodman from his loan at Crawley after first choice keeper Tim Krul suffered a season ending knee injury. Woodman made 12 appearances during his spell with Crawley.

=== Newcastle United debut and loans in Scotland ===
On 9 January 2017, Woodman moved on loan to Scottish Premiership club Kilmarnock for the remainder of the season, along with Newcastle teammates Callum Roberts and Sean Longstaff. He made his debut on 21 January 2017, as Kilmarnock lost 1–0 against Hamilton Academical in the Scottish Cup. Woodman played regularly for Kilmarnock, keeping five clean sheets in 15 appearances. He left the club before the end of the season to play in the 2017 FIFA U-20 World Cup.

Woodman did not go out on loan during the first half of the 2017–18 season, although various clubs were interested in him following his success with the England under-20 team. After spending time on the bench for the first team, Woodman finally made his debut for Newcastle on 6 January 2018 in a 3–1 win over Luton Town in the third round of the FA Cup. On 31 January 2018, Woodman was loaned to Scottish Premiership club Aberdeen for the remainder of the season. Woodman made eight appearances whilst at Aberdeen.

With the permanent signing of Martin Dúbravka in the summer of 2018, Woodman was demoted to fourth-choice and asked to go out on loan again, but the club opted against sanctioning a loan deal.

=== Loans to Swansea City ===
On 1 August 2019, he moved on loan to Championship club Swansea City. He racked up 43 appearances as Swansea missed out on promotion to the Premier League in a 3–2 play-off semi-final aggregate defeat to Brentford.

On 16 August 2020, he moved back on loan to Swansea for the 2020–21 season.

=== Return to Newcastle United ===
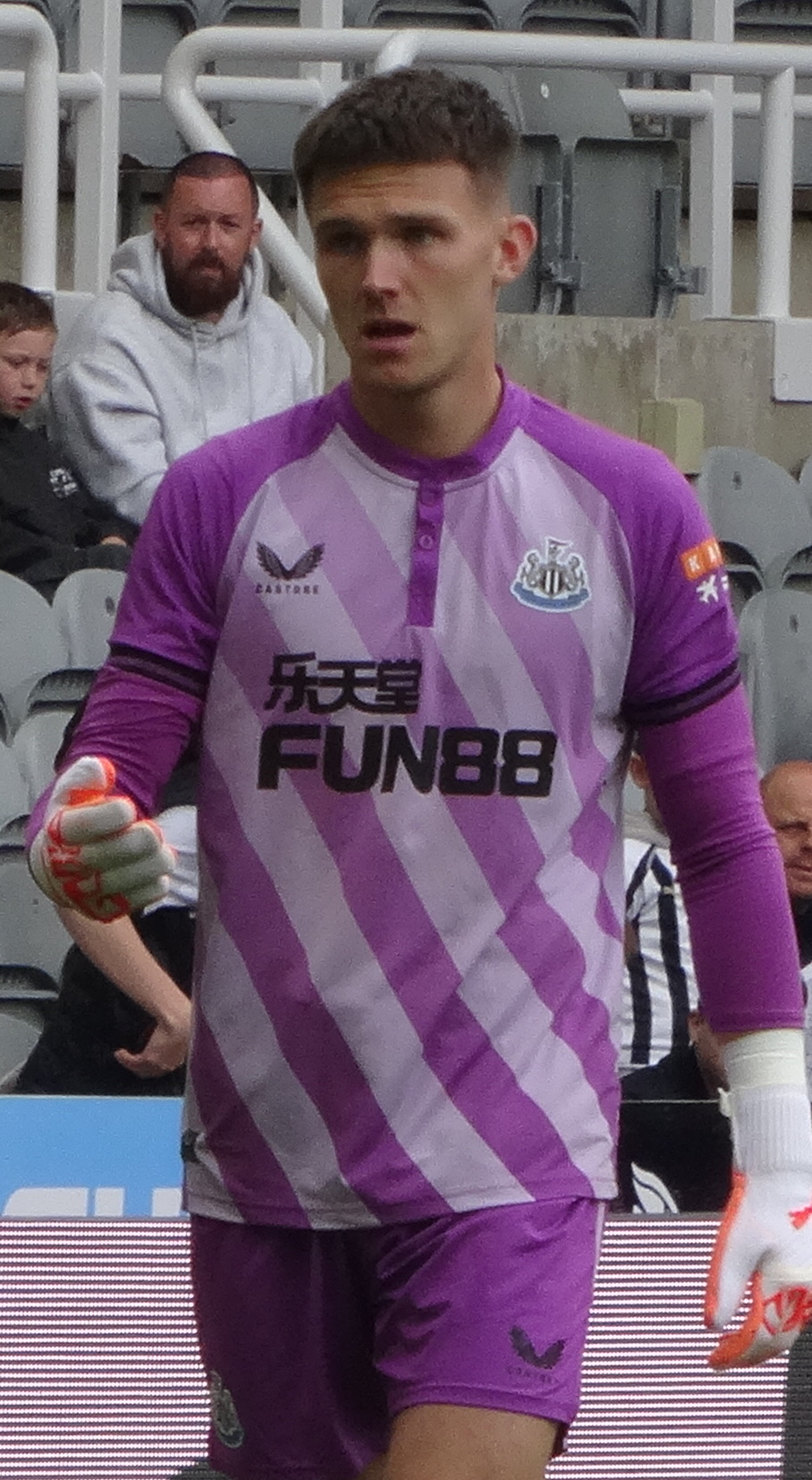
Woodman playing for Newcastle United in 2021

Woodman began the 2021–22 season as number one due to injuries to Newcastle's senior goalkeepers, Martin Dúbravka and Karl Darlow, starting on opening day at home to West Ham United and making further appearances for the next four games, including away to Manchester United. Woodman was sharply criticised following an error-prone afternoon at Old Trafford, where goalkeeping errors led to goals from Cristiano Ronaldo and Bruno Fernandes, ultimately leading to his eventual relegation to the bench, when Darlow was fully fit.

=== Loan to Bournemouth ===
On 31 January 2022, Woodman joined EFL Championship club Bournemouth on loan for the remainder of the 2021–22 season.

=== Preston North End ===
On 21 June 2022, EFL Championship club Preston North End announced the signing of Woodman on a three-year deal for an undisclosed fee. He won the Preston North End Player of the Year Award in his first season.

=== Liverpool ===
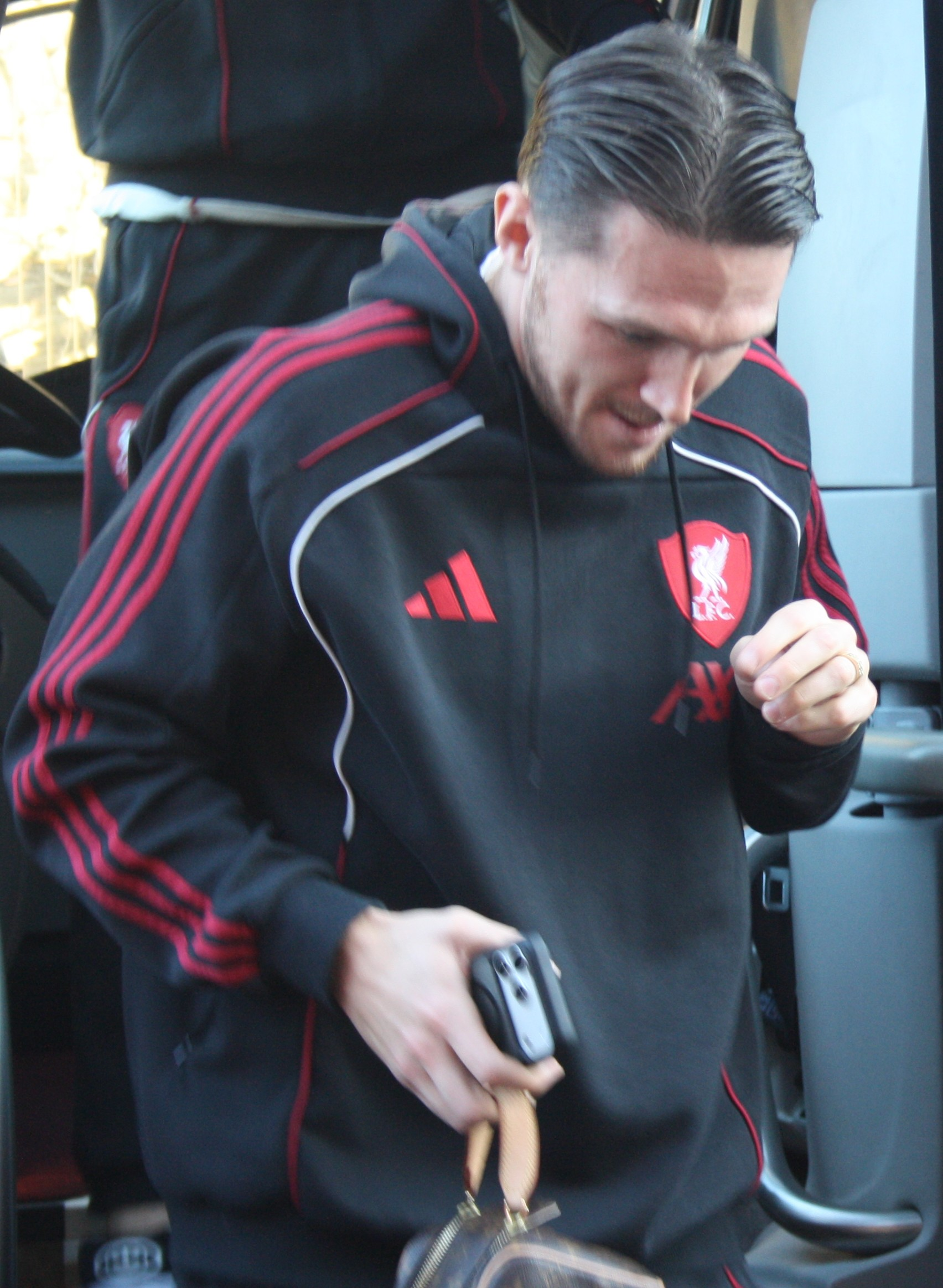
Woodman with Liverpool in 2026

On 27 June 2025, Liverpool announced Woodman would join the club on 1 July on the expiry of his contract with Preston. He made his debut for the club on 29 October 2025, in a 3–0 EFL Cup defeat to Crystal Palace.

On 19 April 2026, Woodman made his Premier League debut for Liverpool, replacing Giorgi Mamardashvili in the 59th minute in a 2–1 Merseyside derby win against Everton at the Hill Dickinson Stadium.

On 25 April 2026, Woodman made his first start for Liverpool in the Premier League in a 3–1 win over Crystal Palace at Anfield.

On 23 July 2026, Woodman signed a new contract with Liverpool.

== International career ==
Woodman won the 2014 UEFA European Under-17 Championship with England, conceding two goals in 4 games and saving a penalty in the final of the tournament against the Netherlands. In the 2014–15 season, Woodman played up an age group with the England U19 side. Woodman was a member of the England squad for the 2016 UEFA European Under-19 Championship, starting in the semi-final defeat against Italy.

On 6 October 2016, Woodman made his debut at Under-21 level against Kazakhstan keeping a clean sheet in the process. He was selected in the England U20 squad for the 2017 FIFA U-20 World Cup, where he won the Golden Glove Award for the tournament's best goalkeeper, and saved a penalty in the final against Venezuela which England won 1–0.

== Personal life ==
He is the son of former Brentford, Northampton Town, Oxford United and Colchester United goalkeeper Andy Woodman and his godfather is former England international defender and former England manager Gareth Southgate. Woodman has two children, the second of whom was born in September 2026.

== Career statistics ==
As of matches played 3 May 2026

Appearances and goals by club, season and competition
Club	Season	League			National cup (Note: Includes FA Cup, Scottish Cup)		League cup (Note: Includes Football League/EFL Cup)		Europe		Other		Total	
Club	Season	Division	Apps	Goals	Apps	Goals	Apps	Goals	Apps	Goals	Apps	Goals	Apps	Goals
Newcastle United	2014–15	Premier League	0	0	0	0	0	0	—		—		0	0
Newcastle United	2015–16	Premier League	0	0	0	0	—		—		—		0	0
Newcastle United	2016–17	Championship	0	0	0	0	0	0	—		—		0	0
Newcastle United	2017–18	Premier League	0	0	1	0	0	0	—		—		1	0
Newcastle United	2018–19	Premier League	0	0	3	0	0	0	—		—		3	0
Newcastle United	2021–22	Premier League	4	0	0	0	1	0	—		—		5	0
Newcastle United	Total		4	0	4	0	1	0	—		—		9	0
Hartlepool United (loan)	2014–15	League Two	0	0	—		—		—		—		0	0
Crawley Town (loan)	2015–16	League Two	11	0	—		1	0	—		—		12	0
Kilmarnock (loan)	2016–17	Scottish Premiership	14	0	1	0	—		—		—		15	0
Aberdeen (loan)	2017–18	Scottish Premiership	5	0	3	0	—		—		—		8	0
Swansea City (loan)	2019–20	Championship	43	0	0	0	0	0	—		0	0	43	0
Swansea City (loan)	2020–21	Championship	45	0	3	0	1	0	—		3 (Note: Appearances in EFL Championship play-offs)	0	52	0
Swansea City (loan)	Total		88	0	3	0	1	0	—		3	0	95	0
Bournemouth (loan)	2021–22	Championship	0	0	1	0	—		—		—		1	0
Preston North End	2022–23	Championship	46	0	2	0	1	0	—		—		49	0
Preston North End	2023–24	Championship	44	0	1	0	0	0	—		—		45	0
Preston North End	2024–25	Championship	37	0	3	0	4	0	—		—		44	0
Preston North End	Total		127	0	6	0	5	0	—		—		138	0
Liverpool	2025–26	Premier League	3	0	0	0	1	0	0	0	0	0	4	0
Liverpool	2026–27	Premier League	0	0	0	0	0	0	0	0	—		0	0
Liverpool	Total		3	0	0	0	1	0	0	0	0	0	4	0
Career total			252	0	18	0	9	0	0	0	3	0	282	0

== Honours ==
Bournemouth

- EFL Championship second-place promotion: 2021–22

England U17

- UEFA European Under-17 Championship: 2014

England U20

- FIFA U-20 World Cup: 2017

England U21

- Toulon Tournament: 2018

Individual

- FIFA U-20 World Cup Golden Glove: 2017
- Toulon Tournament Best XI: 2018
- Toulon Tournament Best Goalkeeper: 2018
- EFL Championship Golden Glove: 2020–21
- Preston North End Player of the Year: 2022–23
