= 2016–17 Hull City A.F.C. season =

English football club season

Hull City
2016–17 season
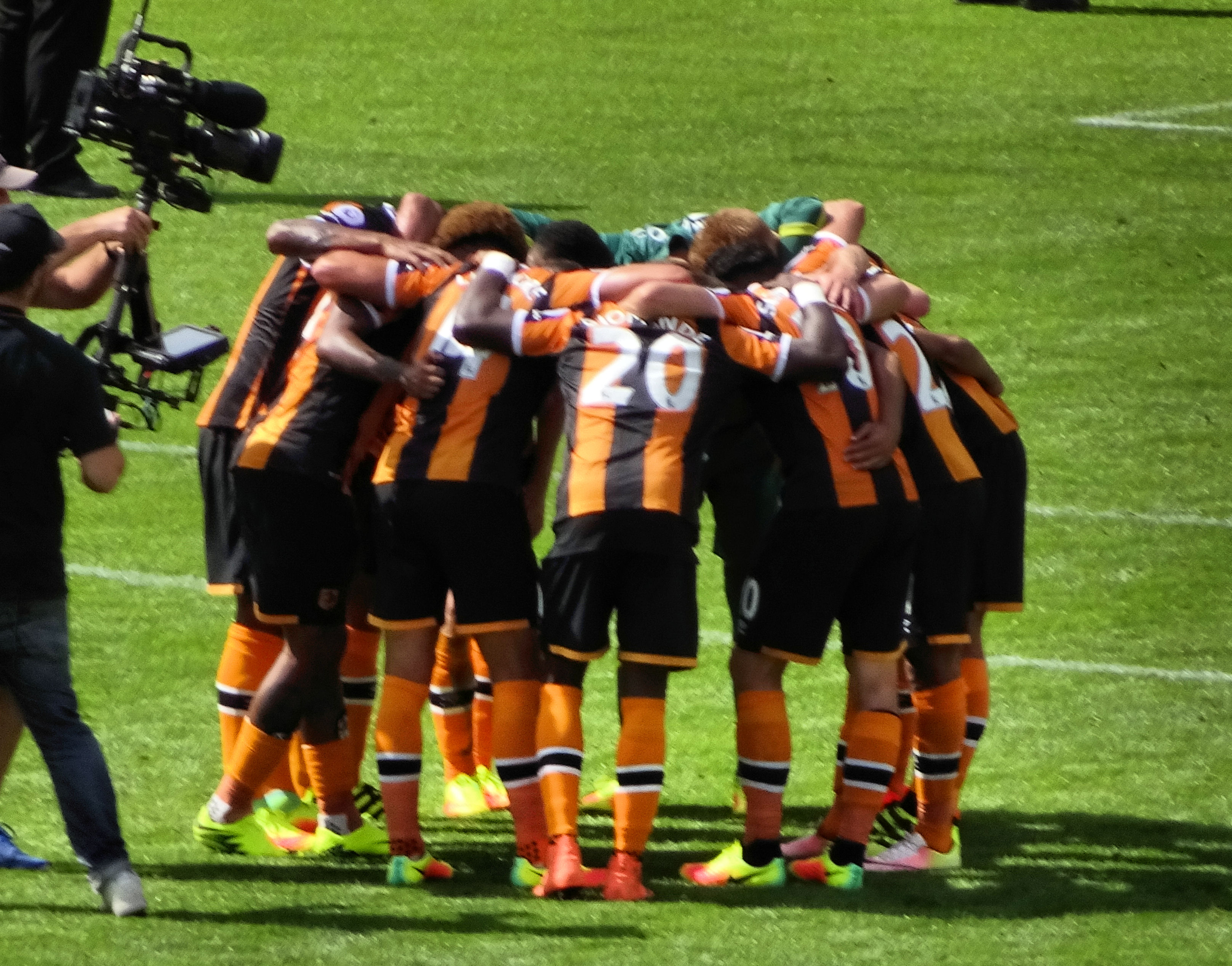
- Hull players huddle before Leicester City at home, 2016
- Owner: Assem Allam
- Chairman: Assem Allam
- Manager: Steve Bruce (until 22 July); Mike Phelan (13 October to 3 January); Marco Silva (5 January–25 May); Leonid Slutsky (9 June–)
- Stadium: KCOM Stadium
- Premier League: 18th (relegated)
- FA Cup: Fourth round (eliminated by Fulham)
- League Cup: Semi-final (eliminated by Manchester United)
- Top goalscorer: League: Robert Snodgrass (7); All: Robert Snodgrass (9)
- Highest home attendance: 24,822 (4 February v Liverpool)
- Lowest home attendance: 17,403 (10 December v Crystal Palace)
- Average home league attendance: 20,761
Home colours	Away colours	Third colours

The 2016–17 season was Hull City's first season back in the Premier League following their promotion via the 2016 Football League play-offs in the previous season in their 113th year in existence. Along with the Premier League, the club competed in the FA Cup and EFL Cup.

Hull were relegated back to the Championship on 14 May 2017, following their 4–0 away defeat to Crystal Palace. It would take them 9 years to make their Premier League comeback, until the 2026–27 Hull City A.F.C. season.

The season covered the period from 1 July 2016 to 30 June 2017.

== Events ==
=== Steve Bruce ===
- On 1 July 2016 Tom Huddlestone signed a new two-year deal with the club.
- On 1 July 2016, goalkeeper Rory Watson went on a season-long loan to North Ferriby United.
- On 1 July 2016, goalkeeper Will Mannion was signed from AFC Wimbledon on a three-year contract.
- On 15 July 2016, in the pre-season friendly against Grimsby Town, Moses Odubajo sustained an injury early in the match, which was later diagnosed as a ruptured medial patellofemoral ligament. This would side-line him for about six months.
- On 19 July 2016, in the pre-season friendly against Mansfield Town, captain Michael Dawson left the field after about half-an-hour after a knock. This was later diagnosed as a medial knee ligament injury which would rule him out for approximately three months, leaving the team with only 13 fit senior players.
- On 20 July 2016, the club announced that takeover talks has been put on hold until after the close of the transfer window.
- On 22 July 2016, the BBC reported that manager Steve Bruce had resigned from his position. This was later confirmed by the club, which also announced that Mike Phelan would act as caretaker manager.

=== Mike Phelan ===
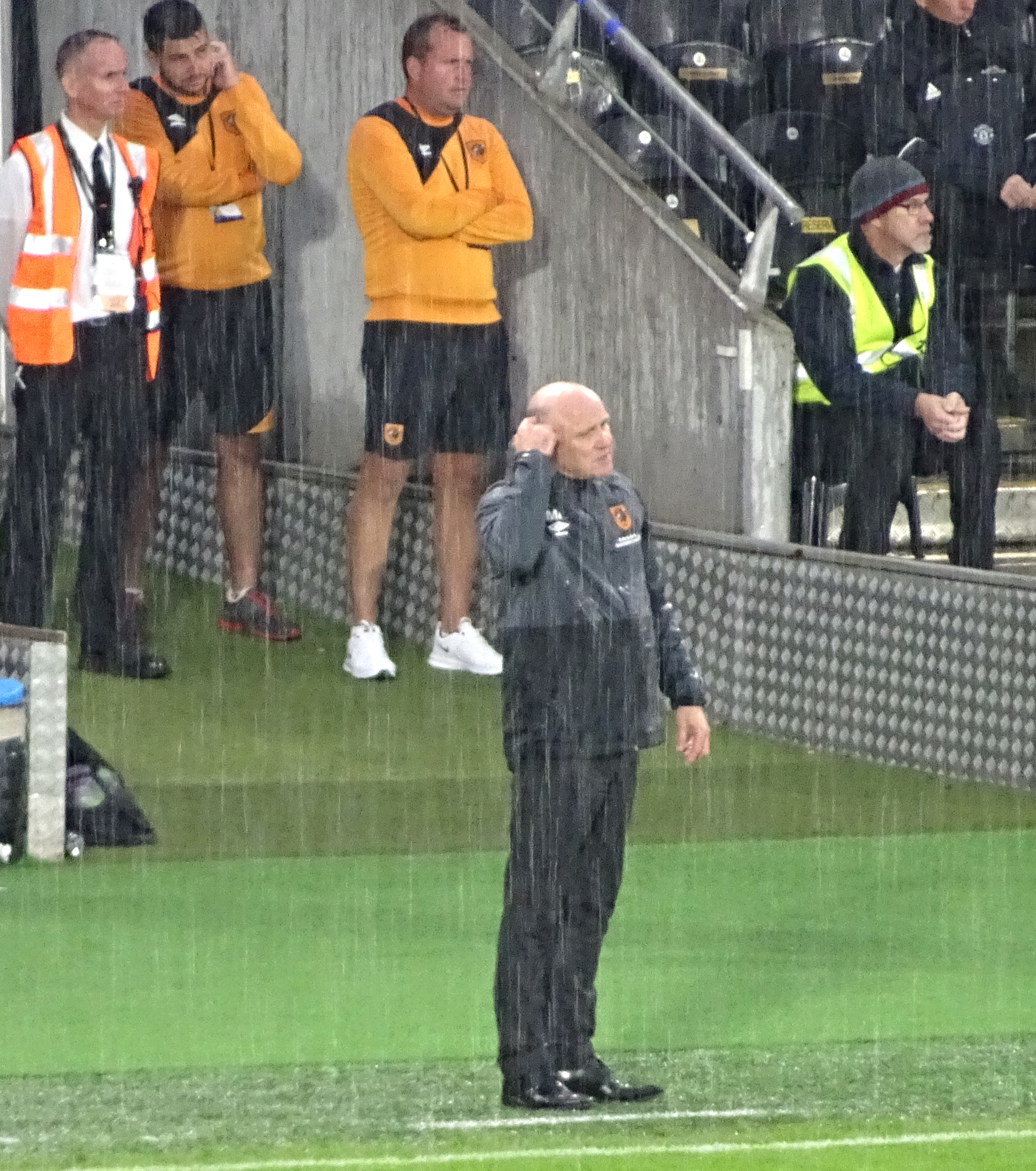
Mike Phelan was appointed caretaker manager in July, won Premier League Manager of the Month for August and became permanent head coach in October.

- On 2 August 2016, the club sacked the first team coach Keith Bertschin.
- On 3 August 2016, Mohamed Diamé turned down a new contract with the club and signed a three-year deal with Newcastle United for an undisclosed fee.
- On 12 August 2016, Calaum Jahraldo-Martin signed for Oldham Athletic on a free transfer.
- On 17 August 2016, Sam Clucas signed a new three-year deal with the club.
- On 18 August 2016, Hull signed defender Bradley Maslen-Jones on a one-year contract from Peterborough United on a free transfer.
- On 30 August 2016, Hull signed goalkeeper David Marshall on a three-year deal from Cardiff City for an undisclosed fee, they also signed centre midfielder Ryan Mason on a three-year deal from Tottenham Hotspur for an undisclosed fee that broke the previous club record signing. The third signing of the day was centre forward Will Keane from Manchester United on a three-year deal for £1 million.
- On transfer deadline day, 31 August 2016, centre midfielder James Weir signed on a three-year deal from Manchester United for an undisclosed fee. Hull also brought in Dieumerci Mbokani on a season-long loan from Dynamo Kyiv and Markus Henriksen on loan from AZ until January 2017, when the loan became permanent.
- On 9 September 2016, caretaker manager Mike Phelan was named Premier League Manager of the Month for August.
- On 13 October 2016, Stephen Clemence left the club to take up a role at Aston Villa.
- On 13 October 2016, Mike Phelan became Hull's permanent head coach.
- On 24 October 2016, Neil McDonald was appointed as assistant head coach.

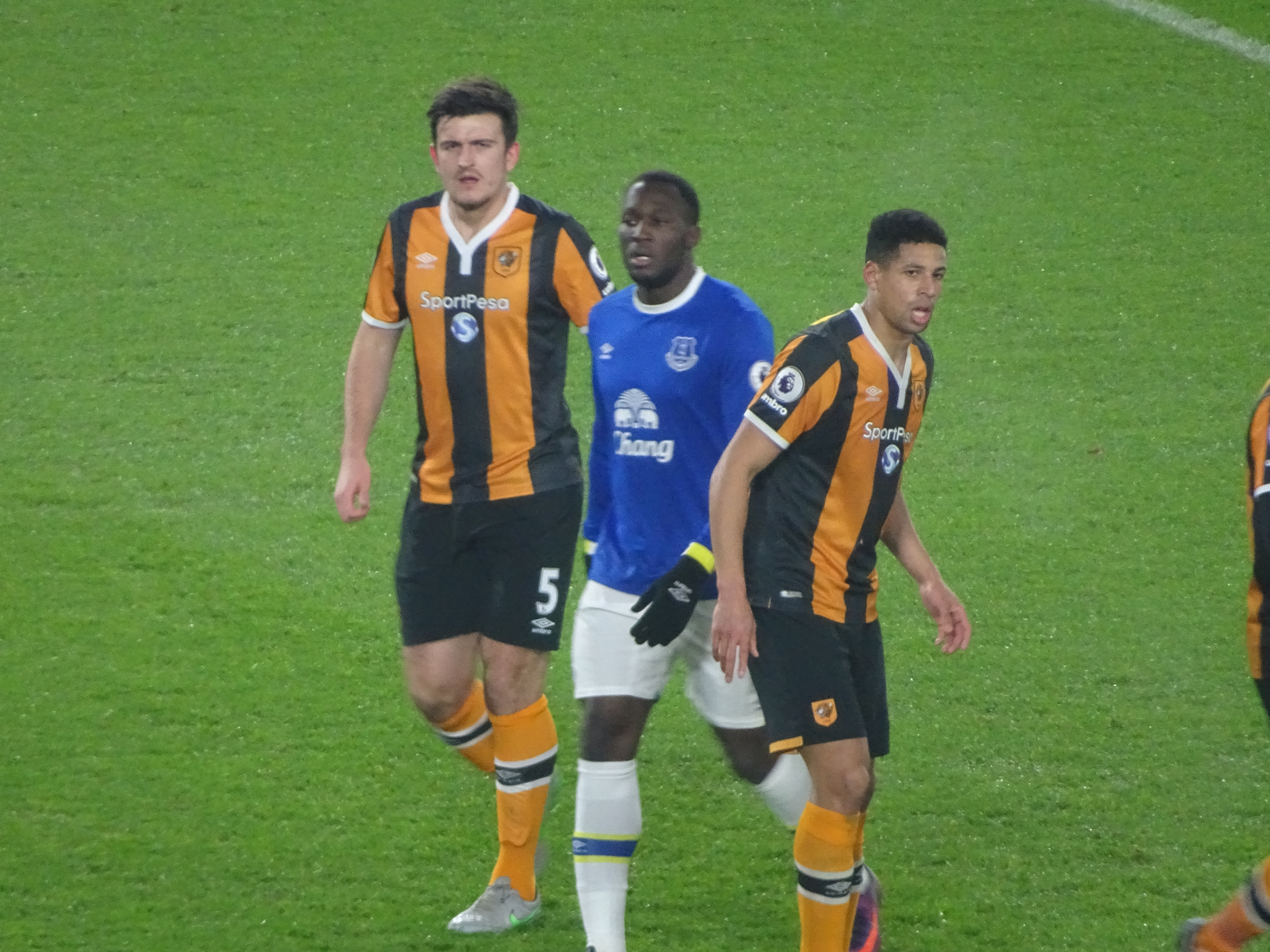
Harry Maguire and Curtis Davies mark Everton's Romelu Lukaku, in Phelan's final home match as Hull boss, being fired in January 2017.

- On 1 November 2016, Gary Walsh left Hull and joined former manager Steve Bruce at Aston Villa as goalkeeper coach.
- On 7 November 2016, Jarrod Bowen signed a two-year extension to his contract with the club.
- On 17 November 2016, Tony Pennock was promoted to first team coach and Jon Beale took over as manager of the Tigers Academy.
- On 23 December 2016, Hull extended the contracts of six first team players, including winger Robert Snodgrass, defenders Michael Dawson, Andrew Robertson and Harry Maguire, midfielder Jake Livermore and striker Abel Hernández, to until the end of the 2017–18 season.
- On 1 January 2017 Jonathan Edwards and Harvey Rodgers moved on loan to Accrington Stanley for the remainder of the season.
- On 3 January 2017, head coach Mike Phelan was sacked by Hull City, less than three months after being made permanent. The decision was made following a 3–1 away defeat to West Bromwich Albion the previous day, leaving the Tigers bottom of the Premier League and three points adrift of safety.
- On 4 January 2017, it was announced that assistant head coach, Neil McDonald, goalkeeping coach, Bobby Mimms, and head scout, Stan Ternent had left the club.

=== Marco Silva ===
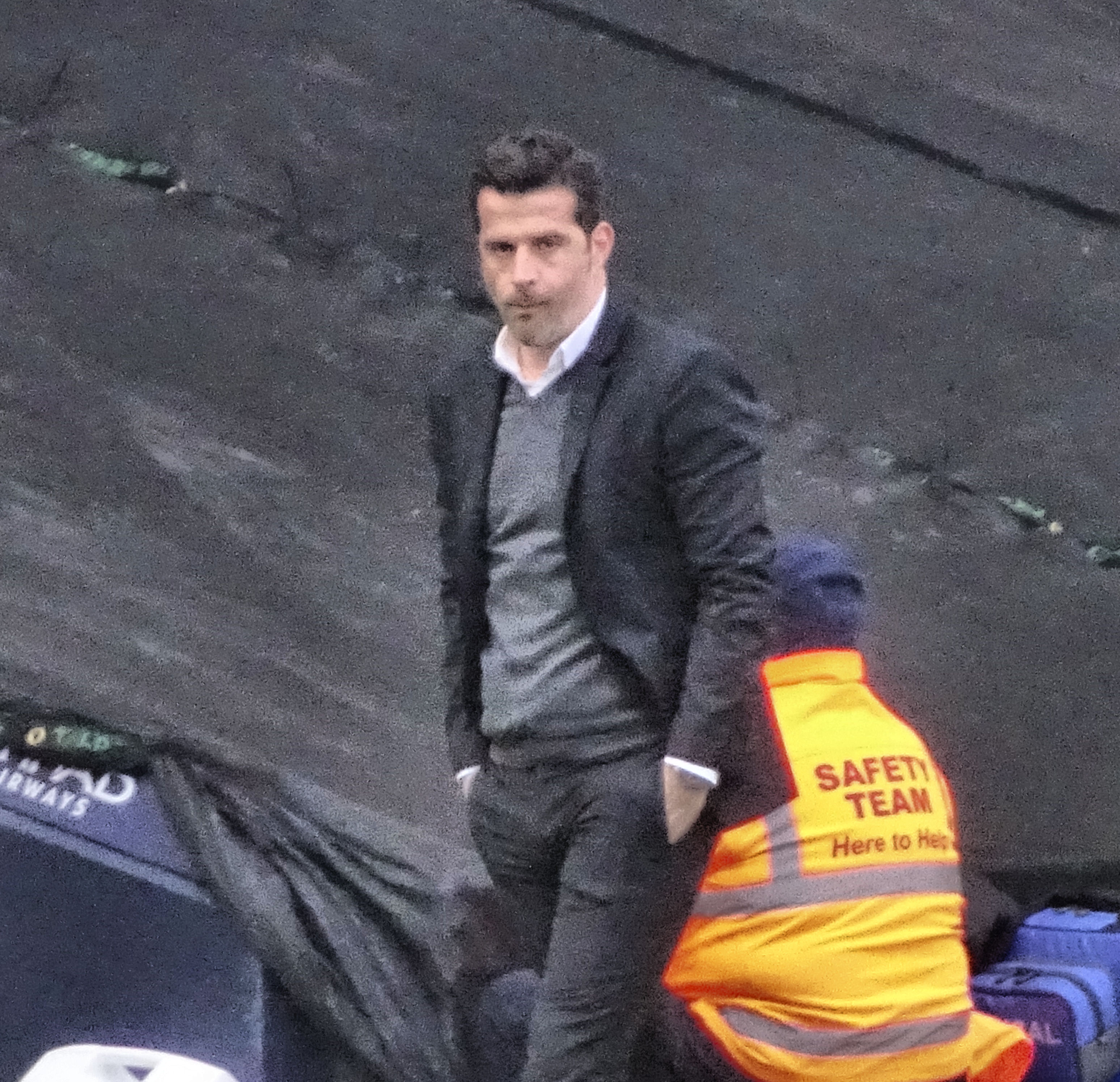
Marco Silva was appointed as Phelan's replacement, two days after his predecessor's departure.

- On 5 January 2017, the club announced the appointment of Marco Silva as the new head coach until the end of the season. He would bring his own back-room staff: assistant head coach João Pedro Sousa, first team coach Gonçalo Pedro and goalkeeping coach Hugo Oliveira.
- On 6 January 2016, Markus Henriksen's loan from AZ became permanent when he signed a 2 1/2-year deal.
- On 13 January 2017, Evandro Goebel signed a 2 1/2-year deal with Hull City.
- On 13 January 2017, Oumar Niasse signed a loan deal from Everton until the end of the 2016–17 season.
- On 17 January 2017, the club announced that first team coach Tony Pennock had left the club.
- On 17 January 2017, Johan Ter Horst moved on loan to York City until the end of 2016–17 season.
- On 18 January 2017, Allan McGregor joined Cardiff City on loan until the end of the 2016–17 season.
- On 20 January 2017, Jake Livermore moved to West Bromwich Albion for an undisclosed fee.
- 20 January 2017, Omar Elabdellaoui was signed on loan from Olympiacos for the remainder of the season.
- On 22 January 2017, 13-minutes into the away match against Chelsea, Ryan Mason sustained a fractured skull after a clash of heads with defender Gary Cahill and was taken to St Mary's Hospital where he underwent surgery. He was discharged from hospital on 30 January 2017.

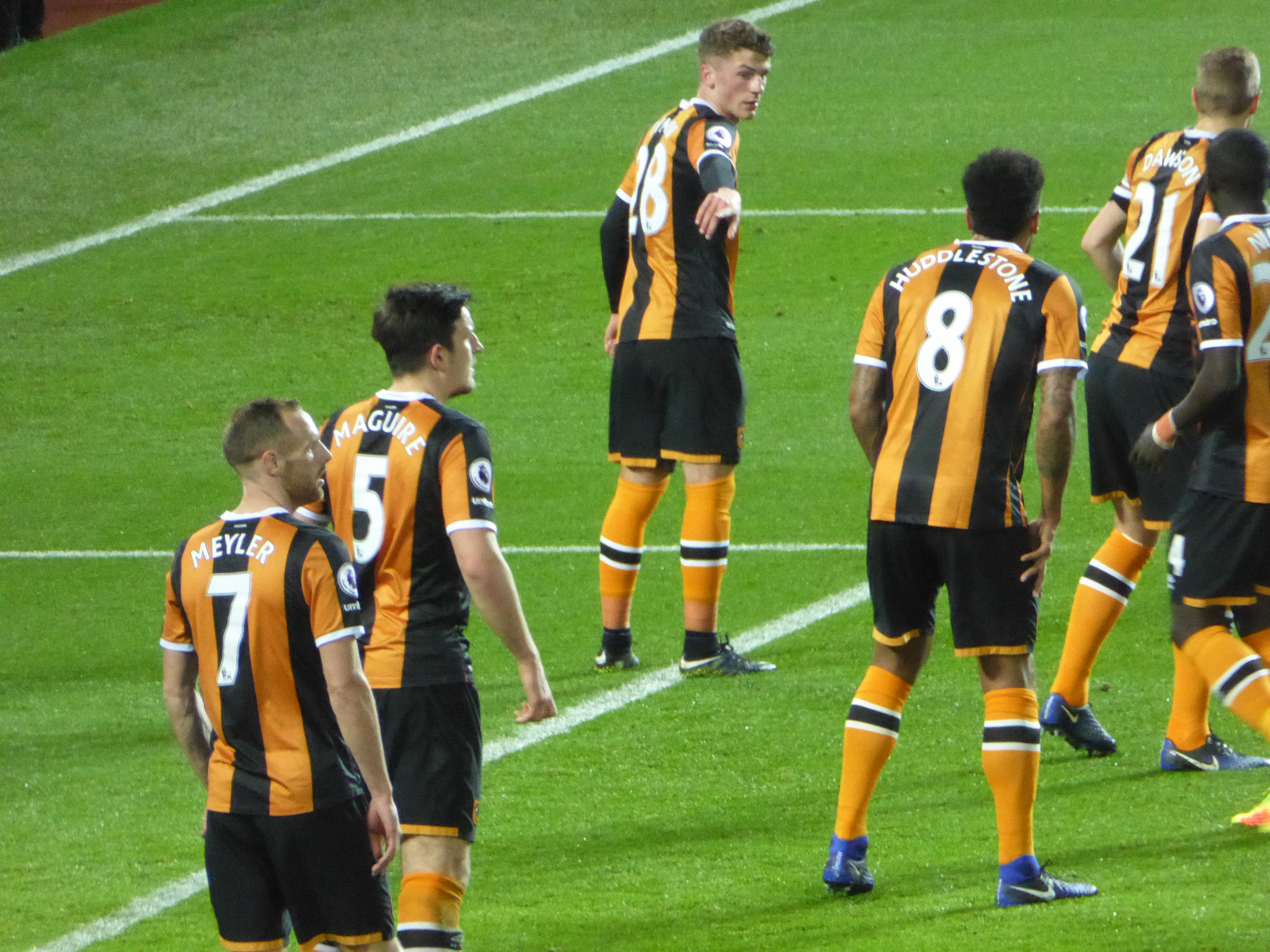
Tigers players during the draw with Manchester United in February 2017

- On 23 January 2017, Lazar Marković signed on loan, from Liverpool, until the end of the season.
- On 27 January 2017, Robert Snodgrass signed a 3 1/2-year deal with West Ham United.
- On 31 January 2017, defender Andrea Ranocchia joined on loan from Internazionale for the rest of the season, Alfred N'Diaye signed on loan from Villarreal for the rest of the season, and Kamil Grosicki joined from Rennais for an undisclosed fee. Alex Bruce and James Weir moved on loan to Wigan Athletic for the rest of the season, Josh Clackstone moved on loan at Notts County until the end of the 2016–17 season, and the season-long loan of goalkeeper Rory Watson to North Ferriby United was terminated and he moved on a free transfer to Scunthorpe United.
- On 3 February 2017 goalkeeper Dušan Kuciak left on a free transfer to join Lechia Gdańsk.
- On 7 March 2017, Jon Beale was appointed as Academy Manager.
- On 25 May 2017, following relegation from the Premier League manager Marco Silva resigned.
- On 7 June 2017 Curtis Davies signed a 2-year contract with Derby County for an undisclosed fee.

=== Leonid Slutsky ===
- On 9 June 2017, the club announced the appointment of Leonid Slutsky as head coach.
- On 15 June 2017, Tony Pennock returned to Hull City as first-team coach.
- On 15 June 2017, Harry Maguire, signed a five-year deal with Leicester City for an undisclosed fee.
- On 16 June 2017, Harvey Rodgers signed a three-year deal with Fleetwood Town.
- On 20 June 2017, Lee Darnbrough was appointed Head of Recruitment, and Pat Mountain was appointed as Goalkeeping Coach.
- On 22 June 2017, the club announced a three-year partnership with the World Wide Fund for Nature to raise money towards a campaign to double the number of wild tigers by 2022.

== Players ==
As of 3 February 2017.

=== First team squad ===
Note: Flags indicate national team as defined under FIFA eligibility rules; some limited exceptions apply. Players may hold more than one non-FIFA nationality.

No.	Pos.	Nation	Player
2	DF	ENG	Moses Odubajo
3	DF	SCO	Andrew Robertson
5	DF	ENG	Harry Maguire
6	DF	ENG	Curtis Davies
7	MF	IRL	David Meyler (vice-captain)
8	MF	ENG	Tom Huddlestone
9	FW	URU	Abel Hernández
10	MF	SEN	Alfred N'Diaye (on loan from Villarreal until 30 June 2017)
11	MF	ENG	Sam Clucas
13	DF	ITA	Andrea Ranocchia (on loan from Internazionale until 30 June 2017)
14	DF	NOR	Omar Elabdellaoui (on loan from Olympiacos until 30 June 2017)
15	MF	SCO	Shaun Maloney
16	GK	SUI	Eldin Jakupović
17	FW	POL	Kamil Grosicki
18	FW	COD	Dieumerci Mbokani (on loan from Dynamo Kyiv until 30 June 2017)
19	FW	ENG	Will Keane
20	FW	NOR	Adama Diomande

No.	Pos.	Nation	Player
21	DF	ENG	Michael Dawson (captain)
22	FW	NOR	Markus Henriksen
23	GK	SCO	David Marshall
24	FW	SEN	Oumar Niasse (on loan from Everton until 30 June 2017)
25	MF	ENG	Ryan Mason
27	DF	EGY	Ahmed Elmohamady
28	DF	ENG	Josh Tymon
29	FW	ENG	Jarrod Bowen
30	MF	ENG	Daniel Batty
31	DF	IRL	Brian Lenihan
32	FW	ENG	Greg Luer
34	MF	ENG	Ellis Barkworth
35	GK	ENG	Will Mannion
36	MF	ENG	Greg Olley
39	FW	ENG	Ben Hinchliffe
40	MF	BRA	Evandro
50	MF	SRB	Lazar Marković (on loan from Liverpool until 30 June 2017)

=== Out on loan ===
Note: Flags indicate national team as defined under FIFA eligibility rules; some limited exceptions apply. Players may hold more than one non-FIFA nationality.

No.	Pos.	Nation	Player
1	GK	SCO	Allan McGregor (On loan at Cardiff City until end of 2016–17 season)
4	DF	NIR	Alex Bruce (On loan at Wigan Athletic until end of 2016–17 season)
17	MF	ENG	James Weir (On loan at Wigan Athletic until end of 2016–17 season)
33	FW	ENG	Johan Ter Horst (On loan at York City until end of 2016–17 season)
37	DF	ENG	Josh Clackstone (On loan at Notts County until end of 2016–17 season)
38	DF	ENG	Harvey Rodgers (On loan at Accrington Stanley until end of 2016–17 season)

== Transfers ==
=== Transfers in ===
Date from	Position	Nationality	Name	From	Fee	Ref.
1 July 2016	CF	ENG	Jonathan Edwards	Peterborough United	Free transfer	
1 July 2016	GK	ENG	Will Mannion	AFC Wimbledon	Undisclosed	
18 August 2016	CB	ENG	Bradley Maslen-Jones	Peterborough United	Free transfer	
30 August 2016	CF	ENG	Will Keane	Manchester United	£1,000,000	
30 August 2016	GK	SCO	David Marshall	Cardiff City	£3,500,000	
30 August 2016	CM	ENG	Ryan Mason	Tottenham Hotspur	£13,000,000	
31 August 2016	CM	ENG	James Weir	Manchester United	Undisclosed	
6 January 2017	CM	NOR	Markus Henriksen	AZ Alkmaar	Undisclosed	
13 January 2017	MF	BRA	Evandro Goebel	FC Porto	Undisclosed	
31 January 2017	FW	POL	Kamil Grosicki	Rennais	Undisclosed	

=== Transfers out ===
Date from	Position	Nationality	Name	To	Fee	Ref.
30 June 2016	RW	NGA	Sone Aluko	Fulham (Note: Following Aluko's release, he signed for Fulham.)	Free transfer	
30 June 2016	RB	ENG	Ryan Taylor	Port Vale (Note: Following Taylor's release, he signed for Port Vale.)	Free transfer	
1 July 2016	CB	ENG	Ben Clappison	York City	Free transfer	
3 August 2016	CM	SEN	Mohamed Diamé	Newcastle United	£4,500,000	
12 August 2016	RW	ATG	Calaum Jahraldo-Martin	Oldham Athletic	Free transfer	
20 January 2017	CM	ENG	Jake Livermore	West Bromwich Albion	Undisclosed	
27 January 2017	RW	SCO	Robert Snodgrass	West Ham United	£10,200,000	
31 January 2017	GK	ENG	Rory Watson	Scunthorpe United	Free transfer	
3 February 2017	GK	SVK	Dušan Kuciak	Lechia Gdańsk	Free transfer	
15 June 2017	CB	ENG	Harry Maguire	Leicester City	Undisclosed	
16 June 2017	RB	ENG	Harvey Rodgers	Fleetwood Town	Free transfer	

=== Loans in ===
Date from	Position	Nationality	Name	From	Date until	Ref.
31 August 2016	ST	COD	Dieumerci Mbokani	Dynamo Kyiv	End of Season	
31 August 2016	CM	NOR	Markus Henriksen	AZ	6 January 2017 (Note: On 6 January 2017, Markus Henriksen's loan became permanent.)	
13 January 2017	FW	SEN	Oumar Niasse	Everton	End of Season	
20 January 2017	DF	NOR	Omar Elabdellaoui	Olympiacos	End of Season	
23 January 2017	MF	SRB	Lazar Marković	Liverpool	End of Season	
31 January 2017	CB	ITA	Andrea Ranocchia	Internazionale	End of Season	
31 January 2017	MF	SEN	Alfred N'Diaye	Villarreal	End of Season	

=== Loans out ===
Date from	Position	Nationality	Name	To	Date until	Ref.
1 July 2016	LB	ENG	Max Clark	Cambridge United	End of Season	(Note: On 1 January 2017, Max Clark's loan at Cambridge United was extended until the end of the season.)
1 July 2016	GK	ENG	Rory Watson	North Ferriby United	31 January 2017	(Note: On 31 January 2017, Rory Watson's loan was terminated.)
1 January 2017	CF	ENG	Jonathan Edwards	Accrington Stanley	End of Season	
1 January 2017	CB	ENG	Harvey Rodgers	Accrington Stanley	End of Season	
17 January 2017	FW	ENG	Johan Ter Horst	York City	End of Season	
18 January 2017	GK	SCO	Allan McGregor	Cardiff City	End of Season	
31 January 2017	CB	NIR	Alex Bruce	Wigan Athletic	End of Season	
31 January 2017	CM	ENG	James Weir	Wigan Athletic	End of Season	
31 January 2017	DF	ENG	Josh Clackstone	Notts County	End of Season	

== Pre-season ==
The Tigers will hold a pre-season training camp in Portugal from 5 to 16 July 2016.

On 13 June 2015, Hull City announced a series of local pre-season friendlies against Grimsby Town, North Ferriby United, Mansfield Town, Scunthorpe United, Barnsley and Nottingham Forest. On 28 June 2016, two friendlies were announced to take place in Austria, against Çaykur Rizespor and Torino.

Win Draw Loss

15 July 2016 Friendly	Grimsby Town	0–0	Hull City	Cleethorpes
19:30 BST		Report		Stadium: Blundell Park; Attendance: 2,469 (420 away)

16 July 2016 Billy Bly Memorial Trophy	North Ferriby United	0–2	Hull City	North Ferriby
15:00 BST		Report	Olley; Luer	Stadium: Grange Lane; Attendance: 1,473

19 July 2016 Friendly	Mansfield Town	0–1	Hull City	Mansfield
19:30 BST		Report	Bowen 55'	Stadium: Field Mill

23 July 2016 Friendly	Scunthorpe United	0–2	Hull City	Scunthorpe
15:00 BST		Report	Maloney 25'; Hernández 65'	Stadium: Glanford Park

26 July 2016 Friendly	Barnsley	2–2	Hull City	Barnsley
19:30 BST	Bradshaw 35', 50'	Report	Diomande 16'; Bowen 86'	Stadium: Oakwell

30 July 2016 Friendly	Nottingham Forest	1–2	Hull City	West Bridgford
15:00 BST	Burke 86'	Report	Diomande 6', 17'	Stadium: City Ground; Attendance: 3,777 (181 away); Referee: L. Collins

3 August 2016 Friendly	Çaykur Rizespor	1–3	Hull City	Kufstein, Austria
17:00 BST	Fink 2'	Report	Hernández 30' (pen.), 55'; Snodgrass 76'	Stadium: Kufstein Arena

6 August 2016 Friendly	Torino	2–1	Hull City	Salzburg, Austria
15:00 BST	Belotti 18'; Bovo 83'	Report	Hernández 27'	Stadium: My Phone Austria Stadion

== Competitions ==
=== Overall ===
Competition	Started round	Current position / round	Final position / round	First match	Last match
Premier League	—	—	18th (relegated)	13 August 2016	21 May 2017
League Cup	Second round	—	Semi-finals	23 August 2016	26 January 2017
FA Cup	Third round	—	Fourth round	7 January 2017	29 January 2017

Updated to match played 21 May 2017
Source: Competitions

=== Premier League ===
==== League table ====
Pos	Team	Pld	W	D	L	GF	GA	GD	Pts	Qualification or relegation
16	Burnley	38	11	7	20	39	55	−16	40	
17	Watford	38	11	7	20	40	68	−28	40	
18	Hull City (R)	38	9	7	22	37	80	−43	34	Relegation to EFL Championship
19	Middlesbrough (R)	38	5	13	20	27	53	−26	28	Relegation to EFL Championship
20	Sunderland (R)	38	6	6	26	29	69	−40	24	Relegation to EFL Championship

Source: Premier League
Rules for classification: 1) Points; 2) Goal difference; 3) Goals scored; 4) Play-offs (only if needed to decide champion, teams for relegation or teams for UEFA competitions).
(R) Relegated

==== Results summary ====
Overall								Home						Away					
Pld	W	D	L	GF	GA	GD	Pts	W	D	L	GF	GA	GD	W	D	L	GF	GA	GD
38	9	7	22	37	80	−43	34	8	4	7	28	35	−7	1	3	15	9	45	−36

Last updated: 21 May 2017.
Source: Premier League

==== Results by matchday ====
Matchday	1	2	3	4	5	6	7	8	9	10	11	12	13	14	15	16	17	18	19	20	21	22	23	24	25	26	27	28	29	30	31	32	33	34	35	36	37	38
Ground	H	A	H	A	H	A	H	A	H	A	H	A	H	A	H	A	A	H	H	A	H	A	A	H	A	H	A	H	A	H	H	A	A	H	A	H	A	H
Result	W	W	L	D	L	L	L	L	L	L	W	L	D	L	D	L	L	L	D	L	W	L	D	W	L	D	L	W	L	W	W	L	L	W	D	L	L	L
Position	4	3	5	6	10	12	15	16	18	18	18	18	18	19	19	19	20	20	19	19	18	19	19	18	18	19	19	18	18	18	17	17	17	17	17	18	18	18

Updated to match(es) played on 21 May 2017. Source: Statto.com
A = Away; H = Home; W = Win; D = Draw; L = Loss

==== Matches ====
On 15 June 2016, the fixtures for the season were announced and Hull started the season with a home tie against champions Leicester City on 13 August 2016. The season concluded with a home game against Tottenham Hotspur on 21 May 2017.

Win Draw Loss

13 August 2016 1	Hull City	2–1	Leicester City	Kingston upon Hull
12:30 BST	Diomande 45+1'; Snodgrass 57'; Davies (yellow card) 71'; Clucas (yellow card) 83'	Report	Fuchs (yellow card) 29'; Simpson (yellow card) 33'; Mahrez 47' (pen.)	Stadium: KCOM Stadium; Attendance: 20,137; Referee: Mike Dean

20 August 2016 2	Swansea City	0–2	Hull City	Swansea
15:00 BST		Report	Maloney 79'; Hernández 90+2'	Stadium: Liberty Stadium; Attendance: 20,024; Referee: Stuart Attwell

27 August 2016 3	Hull City	0–1	Manchester United	Kingston upon Hull
17:30 BST	Huddlestone (yellow card) 71'; Meyler (yellow card) 77'	Report	Fellaini (yellow card) 23'; Rooney (yellow card) 76'; Rashford 90+2', (yellow card) 90+3'	Stadium: KCOM Stadium; Attendance: 24,560; Referee: Jonathan Moss

10 September 2016 4	Burnley	1–1	Hull City	Burnley
15:00 BST	Mee (yellow card) 27'; Defour 72'; Arfield (yellow card) 82'	Report	Snodgrass 90+5'	Stadium: Turf Moor; Attendance: 18,803; Referee: Paul Tierney

17 September 2016 5	Hull City	1–4	Arsenal	Kingston upon Hull
15:00 BST	Livermore (red card) 40'; Snodgrass 79' (pen.)	Report	Sánchez 17', 83'; Cazorla (yellow card) 34'; Walcott 55'; Čech (yellow card) 78'; Xhaka 90+2'	Stadium: KCOM Stadium; Attendance: 22,536; Referee: Roger East

24 September 2016 6	Liverpool	5–1	Hull City	Liverpool
15:00 BST	Lallana 17'; Milner (yellow card) 19', (goal) 30' (pen.), 71' (pen.); Mané 36'; Coutinho 52'	Report	Huddlestone (yellow card) 7'; Elmohamady (red card) 29'; Mason (yellow card) 37'; Meyler 51'	Stadium: Anfield; Attendance: 53,109; Referee: Andre Marriner

1 October 2016 7	Hull City	0–2	Chelsea	Kingston upon Hull
15:00 BST	Livermore (yellow card) 42'; Robertson (yellow card) 79'	Report	Moses (yellow card) 35'; Matić (yellow card) 41'; Willian 61'; Costa 67'	Stadium: KCOM Stadium; Attendance: 21,257; Referee: Anthony Taylor

15 October 2016 8	AFC Bournemouth	6–1	Hull City	Bournemouth
15:00 BST	Daniels 5'; Cook 41'; Stanislas 45' (pen.), 65'; Wilson 83'; Gosling 88'	Report	Clucas (yellow card) 19'; Mason 34'; Snodgrass (yellow card) 44'; Robertson (yellow card) 59'	Stadium: Dean Court; Attendance: 11,029; Referee: Lee Mason

22 October 2016 9	Hull City	0–2	Stoke City	Kingston upon Hull
15:00 BST	Mason (yellow card) 77'; Clucas (yellow card) 90+6'	Report	Shaqiri 26', 50', (yellow card) 90+7'; Bardsley (yellow card) 90+7'; Allen (yellow card) 90+7'	Stadium: KCOM Stadium; Attendance: 18,522; Referee: Kevin Friend

29 October 2016 10	Watford	1–0	Hull City	Watford
15:00 BST	Behrami (yellow card) 53'; Dawson 82' (o.g.)	Report	Mason (yellow card) 57'; Clucas (yellow card) 58'	Stadium: Vicarage Road; Attendance: 20,022; Referee: Jonathan Moss

6 November 2016 11	Hull City	2–1	Southampton	Kingston upon Hull
14:15 GMT	Snodgrass 61'; Dawson 63'	Report	Austin 6' (pen.); Tadić (yellow card) 29'; Clasie (yellow card) 57'; Bertrand (yellow card) 72'; Yoshida (yellow card) 84'; Romeu (yellow card) 90+1'	Stadium: KCOM Stadium; Attendance: 17,768; Referee: Graham Scott

19 November 2016 12	Sunderland	3–0	Hull City	Sunderland
15:00 GMT	Djilobodji (yellow card) 31' (yellow-red card) 89'; Defoe 34'; Anichebe 62', 84'; Jones (yellow card) 72'	Report		Stadium: Stadium of Light; Attendance: 41,271; Referee: Lee Mason

26 November 2016 13	Hull City	1–1	West Bromwich Albion	Kingston upon Hull
15:00 GMT	Dawson (yellow card) 29', (goal) 72'; Clucas (yellow card) 42'; Diomande (yellow card) 73'	Report	McAuley 34', (yellow card) 60'; Evans (yellow card) 67'	Stadium: KCOM Stadium; Attendance: 18,086; Referee: Paul Tierney

5 December 2016 14	Middlesbrough	1–0	Hull City	Middlesbrough
20:00 GMT	Ramírez 60'; Fábio (yellow card) 72'	Report	Livermore (yellow card) 15'	Stadium: Riverside Stadium; Attendance: 27,395; Referee: Mike Dean

10 December 2016 15	Hull City	3–3	Crystal Palace	Kingston upon Hull
15:00 GMT	Snodgrass (yellow card) 20', (goal) 27' (pen.); Elmohamady (yellow card) 43'; Diomande 72'; Livermore 78'	Report	Dann (yellow card) 26'; McArthur (yellow card) 45+1'; Puncheon (yellow card) 46'; C. Benteke 52' (pen.); Zaha 70'; Cabaye (yellow card) 79'; Campbell 89'	Stadium: KCOM Stadium; Attendance: 17,403; Referee: Mike Jones

14 December 2016 16	Tottenham Hotspur	3–0	Hull City	Tottenham, London
20:00 GMT	Eriksen 14', 63'; Wanyama 73'	Report	Maguire (yellow card) 18'; Davies (yellow card) 59'	Stadium: White Hart Lane; Attendance: 31,347; Referee: Andre Marriner

17 December 2016 17	West Ham United	1–0	Hull City	Stratford, London
15:00 GMT	Obiang (yellow card) 36'; Noble (yellow card) 60', (goal) 76' (pen.)	Report	Livermore (yellow card) 32'; Dawson (yellow card) 74'; Henriksen (yellow card) 84'; Maguire (yellow card) 90+5'	Stadium: Olympic Stadium; Attendance: 56,952; Referee: Lee Mason

26 December 2016 18	Hull City	0–3	Manchester City	Kingston upon Hull
17:15 GMT	Mason (yellow card) 82'	Report	Touré 72' (pen.); Iheanacho 78'; Davies 90+4' (o.g.)	Stadium: KCOM Stadium; Attendance: 23,134; Referee: Robert Madley

30 December 2016 19	Hull City	2–2	Everton	Kingston upon Hull
20:00 GMT	Dawson 6'; Elmohamady (yellow card) 62'; Snodgrass 65'; Maguire (yellow card) 83'	Report	Marshall 45+1' (o.g.); Jagielka (yellow card) 60'; Davies (yellow card) 75'; Barkley 84'	Stadium: KCOM Stadium; Attendance: 20,111; Referee: Jonathan Moss

2 January 2017 20	West Bromwich Albion	3–1	Hull City	West Bromwich
15:00 GMT	Brunt 49'; McAuley 62'; Morrison 73'	Report	Snodgrass 21'	Stadium: The Hawthorns; Attendance: 23,402; Referee: Mark Clattenburg

14 January 2017 21	Hull City	3–1	AFC Bournemouth	Kingston upon Hull
15:00 GMT	Hernández 32', 50'; Mings 62' (o.g.)	Report	Stanislas 3' (pen.); Smith (yellow card) 60'	Stadium: KCOM Stadium; Attendance: 17,963; Referee: Martin Atkinson

22 January 2017 22	Chelsea	2–0	Hull City	Fulham, London
16:30 GMT	Kanté (yellow card) 43'; Costa 45+7'; Cahill 81'	Report	Dawson (yellow card) 7'; Davies (yellow card) 26'; Robertson (yellow card) 52'	Stadium: Stamford Bridge; Attendance: 41,605; Referee: Neil Swarbrick

1 February 2017 23	Manchester United	0–0	Hull City	Manchester
20:00 GMT	Rooney (yellow card) 84'	Report	Niasse (yellow card) 13'; Clucas (yellow card) 79'; Marković (yellow card) 81'; Meyler (yellow card) 89'	Stadium: Old Trafford; Attendance: 75,297; Referee: Mike Jones

4 February 2017 24	Hull City	2–0	Liverpool	Kingston upon Hull
15:00 GMT	Maguire (yellow card) 27'; N'Diaye 44'; Tymon (yellow card) 74'; Niasse 84'	Report	Milner (yellow card) 40'	Stadium: KCOM Stadium; Attendance: 24,822; Referee: Lee Mason

11 February 2017 25	Arsenal	2–0	Hull City	Holloway, London
12:30 GMT	Sánchez 34', 90+3' (pen.), (yellow card) 76'; Walcott (yellow card) 53'; Gibbs (yellow card) 54' (Note: Hull City players protested over the incident as they felt it should have been a red card. The Football Association subsequently charged the club for failing to control their players. Hull admitted the charge and were fined £20,000.)	Report	Ranocchia (yellow card) 70'; Clucas (red card) 90+1'	Stadium: Emirates Stadium; Attendance: 59,962; Referee: Mark Clattenburg

25 February 2017 26	Hull City	1–1	Burnley	Kingston upon Hull
15:00 GMT	Huddlestone (yellow card) 53', (goal) 72' (pen.)	Report	Westwood (yellow card) 40'; Barnes (yellow card) 71' (yellow-red card) 90+2'; Keane 76'	Stadium: KCOM Stadium; Attendance: 20,156; Referee: Martin Atkinson

4 March 2017 27	Leicester City	3–1	Hull City	Leicester
15:00 GMT	Fuchs 27'; Drinkwater (yellow card) 49'; Mahrez 59'; Huddlestone 90' (o.g.)	Report	Clucas 14'; Huddlestone (yellow card) 89'	Stadium: King Power Stadium; Attendance: 31,971; Referee: Mike Dean

11 March 2017 28	Hull City	2–1	Swansea City	Kingston upon Hull
15:00 GMT	N'Diaye (yellow card) 45+4'; Huddlestone (yellow card) 56'; Niasse 69', 78'; Marković (yellow card) 73'	Report	Olsson (yellow card) 45+4'; Mawson 90+1'	Stadium: KCOM Stadium; Attendance: 19,195; Referee: Andre Marriner

18 March 2017 29	Everton	4–0	Hull City	Walton, Liverpool
15:00 GMT	Calvert-Lewin 9'; Williams (yellow card) 63'; Valencia 78'; Barry (yellow card) 79'; Lukaku 90+1', 90+4'	Report	Huddlestone (red card) 73'	Stadium: Goodison Park; Attendance: 39,248; Referee: Paul Tierney

1 April 2017 30	Hull City	2–1	West Ham United	Kingston upon Hull
15:00 BST	Robertson 53'; Niasse (yellow card) 57'; N'Diaye (yellow card) 73'; Ranocchia 85'	Report	Fonte (yellow card) 1'; Carroll 18', (yellow card) 66'	Stadium: KCOM Stadium; Attendance: 20,820; Referee: Mike Jones

5 April 2017 31	Hull City	4–2	Middlesbrough	Kingston upon Hull
19:45 BST	Marković 14'; Clucas (yellow card) 19'; Niasse 27'; Hernández 33'; Maguire 70'; N'Diaye (yellow card) 85'	Report	Negredo 5'; Clayton (yellow card) 21' de Roon 45'	Stadium: KCOM Stadium; Attendance: 20,380; Referee: Michael Oliver

8 April 2017 32	Manchester City	3–1	Hull City	Manchester
15:00 BST	Elmohamady 31' (o.g.); Agüero 48'; Delph 64'	Report	Evandro (yellow card) 28'; N'Diaye (yellow card) 69'; Ranocchia 85'	Stadium: City of Manchester Stadium; Attendance: 54,393; Referee: Jonathan Moss

15 April 2017 33	Stoke City	3–1	Hull City	Stoke-on-Trent
15:00 BST	Arnautović 6'; Crouch 66'; Shaqiri 80'	Report	Niasse (yellow card) 45'; Maguire 51'; Marković (yellow card) 70'	Stadium: bet365 Stadium; Attendance: 37,505; Referee: Stuart Attwell

22 April 2017 34	Hull City	2–0	Watford	Kingston upon Hull
15:00 BST	Niasse (red card) 25' (Note: Following appeal to The Football Association the red card was rescinded.); N'Diaye (yellow card) 42'; Marković 62', (yellow card) 66'; Clucas 71'; Robertson (yellow card) 81'	Report	Prödl (yellow card) 68'	Stadium: KCOM Stadium; Attendance: 20,432; Referee: Robert Madley

29 April 2017 35	Southampton	0–0	Hull City	Southampton
15:00 BST		Report	Maguire (yellow card) 70'; N'Diaye (yellow card) 90'; Ranocchia (yellow card) 90+2'	Stadium: St Mary's Stadium; Attendance: 31,120; Referee: Mike Dean

6 May 2017 36	Hull City	0–2	Sunderland	Kingston upon Hull
15:00 BST	Clucas (yellow card) 28'; Grosicki (yellow card) 33'; Elmohamady (yellow card) 84'	Report	Jones 69'; Anichebe (yellow card) 89'; Defoe 90+2'	Stadium: KCOM Stadium; Attendance: 22,480; Referee: Neil Swarbrick

14 May 2017 37	Crystal Palace	4–0	Hull City	Selhurst, London
12:00 BST	Zaha 3'; Benteke 34'; Cabaye (yellow card) 37'; Puncheon (yellow card) 41'; Milivojević 85' (pen.) van Aanholt 90' (yellow card) 90+1'	Report	Robertson (yellow card) 40'; N'Diaye (yellow card) 80'; Dawson (yellow card) 84'; Davies (yellow card) 87'; Clucas (yellow card) 90+3'	Stadium: Selhurst Park; Attendance: 25,176; Referee: Martin Atkinson

21 May 2017 38	Hull City	1–7	Tottenham Hotspur	Kingston upon Hull
15:00 BST	Clucas 66'	Report	Kane 11', 13', 72'; Alli 45+2'; Wanyama 69'; Davies 84'; Alderweireld 87'	Stadium: KCOM Stadium; Attendance: 23,804; Referee: Andre Marriner

=== FA Cup ===
Hull enter the FA Cup in the third-round with the draw taking place at the BT Tower on 5 December 2016. Hull were drawn at home to fellow Premier League team Swansea City. The match took place on 7 January 2017 at the KCOM Stadium and was the first game with new head coach Marco Silva in charge. The first half saw chances at both ends of the field but no one was able to break the deadlock. The second half started in the same way but soon after Abel Hernández was introduced, in place of Markus Henriksen, Hull broke the deadlock when Hernández turned in a cross from Shaun Maloney after 78-minutes. A goal deep in added time by substitute Josh Tymon, his first for the club, added to Hull's lead. At the other end Eldin Jakupović did his part in keeping a clean sheet for Hull who progressed to the fourth round after winning 2–0. The draw for the fourth round took place on 9 January 2017 and Hull were drawn away to Fulham.

The tie took place on 29 January 2017 at 12.30 p.m. at Craven Cottage. Fullam opened the scoring through former city player Sone Aluko after 17-minutes. Hull struck back at the start of the second-half through Evandro Goebel, but Chris Martin restored Fulham's lead 5-minutes later. Fullam went further in front with goals from Ryan Sessegnon and Stefan Johansen. Tomáš Kalas tripped Andrew Robertson in the area to give Hull a penalty. Abel Hernández took the spot-kick which goalkeeper Marcus Bettinelli stopped, Hernández followed through but was fouled by Bettinelli with the awarding of a second penalty. Hernández took the second penalty that was tipped over the bar by Bettinelli. Hull exited the cup, losing 4–1.

Win Draw Loss

7 January 2017 Third	Hull City	2–0	Swansea City	Kingston upon Hull
15:00 GMT	Huddlestone (yellow card) 7'; Clucas (yellow card) 45+1'; Hernández 78'; Tymon 90+3'	Report	Naughton (yellow card) 88'	Stadium: KCOM Stadium; Attendance: 6,608; Referee: Anthony Taylor

29 January 2017 Fourth	Fulham	4–1	Hull City	Fulham, London
12:30 GMT	Aluko 17'; McDonald (yellow card) 36'; Martin 54'; Sessegnon 66'; Johansen (yellow card) 74' (goal) 78'; Kalas (yellow card) 86'	Report	Maguire (yellow card) 32'; Evandro 49'; Hernández (penalty missed) 86' (penalty missed) 87'; Marković (yellow card) 90+2'	Stadium: Craven Cottage; Attendance: 15,143; Referee: Paul Tierney

=== EFL Cup ===
Hull City enter the competition in the second-round, the draw took place on 10 August 2016 and City were drawn away to Exeter City. The match took place on 23 August 2016 with City giving debuts to Dušan Kuciak, Jarrod Bowen and Greg Olley. Exeter took the lead when Jake Taylor scored after 24-minutes. City responded when Adama Diomande hit the net a minute later, scoring a second goal 13 minutes from time. This was quickly followed by Robert Snodgrass hitting the net from a free kick to put City into the next round by a score of 3–1. The draw for the third-round took place the following day and Hull were drawn away to Stoke City. The match took place on 21 September 2016 at the Bet365 Stadium. Marko Arnautović opened the scoring for Stoke after 24 minutes, but Hull drew level just before half-time when Ryan Mason scored his first goal for the club. Stoke dominated the second-half, but in injury time, Markus Henriksen, on his debut, scored the winner for Hull.

The draw for the fourth-round, took place the same day and Hull were again drawn away to Bristol City. The match at Ashton Gate Stadium took place on 25 October 2016. Harry Maguire opened the scoring with a goal just before half-time for Hull, with Michael Dawson getting a second just after the break. Bristol left it late to get on the scoreboard when Lee Tomlin scored in extra-time, and Tammy Abraham went close just before the final whistle. Hull progressed to the fifth round for the second year in a row. Later The Football Association charged Adama Diomande with violent conduct for an incident with Marlon Pack. Diomande accepted the charge and was given a three-match ban. The draw for the quarter-final took place the following day and Hull were drawn at home to Newcastle United.

The match took place on 29 November 2016 at the KCOM Stadium, and both teams missed several chances to score and with a minute to go of normal time Hull's Dieumerci Mbokani was sent off, but this failed to break the deadlock. Extra time was played and Newcastle United had the extra player advantage giving ex-Hull striker Mohamed Diamé the chance to take advantage with a goal eight-minutes into the first period. Hull responded immediately through Robert Snodgrass who levelled the score a minute later. Newcastle United continued to press but could not break the deadlock and the game ended 1–1 after extra time. The game went to penalties, Jonjo Shelvey started for Newcastle but his shot was saved by Eldin Jakupović, Robert Snodgrass converted for Hull, Dwight Gayle's attempt went over the bar while Michael Dawson scored, Christian Atsu put one in for Newcastle before Tom Huddlestone converted his attempt. Newcastle had to score to stay in the match but Yoan Gouffran's attempt was saved by Jakupović and Hull progressed 3–1 on penalties to the semi-final for the first time in their history. The draw for the semi-finals took place the following day and Hull were drawn against Manchester United, the game to be played over two-legs in January 2017.

The first leg took place on 10 January 2017 at Old Trafford. Hull had a depleted side because of injuries and sickness and could only name six substitutes; Tom Huddlestone took the captain's role in the absence of Michael Dawson. Manchester United pressed in the first-half but were unable to make a break through. Markus Henriksen sustained a shoulder injury after 16-minutes and was replaced by Abel Hernández. In the second-half Manchester broke the deadlock after 11-minutes Juan Mata tapped in from close range and with 3-minutes to go Marouane Fellaini doubled the score.

In the second leg, played on 26 January 2017, although Hull managed a 2–1 victory thanks to goals from Tom Huddlestone and Oumar Niasse, Paul Pogba's goal in between them meant they lost the tie 3–2 on aggregate and were eliminated.

Win Draw Loss

23 August 2016 Second	Exeter City	1–3	Hull City	Exeter
19:45 BST	Taylor 24'	Report	Diomande 25', 77'; Snodgrass 81'; Livermore (yellow card) 90'	Stadium: St James Park; Attendance: 4,037; Referee: Andy Woolmer

21 September 2016 Third	Stoke City	1–2	Hull City	Stoke-on-Trent
20:00 BST	Arnautović 24'; Martins Indi (yellow card) 58'; Allen (yellow card) 63'	Report	Mason 45'; Henriksen 90+1'	Stadium: Bet365 Stadium; Attendance: 10,550; Referee: Chris Kavanagh

25 October 2016 Fourth	Bristol City	1–2	Hull City	Bristol
19:45 BST	Bryan (yellow card) 40'; Reid (yellow card) 48'; Flint (yellow card) 65'; Moore (yellow card) 67'; Tomlin 90+3'	Report	Maguire 44'; Davies (yellow card) 45+3'; Dawson 47'	Stadium: Ashton Gate Stadium; Attendance: 16,149; Referee: Keith Stroud

29 November 2016 Fifth	Hull City	1–1 (a.e.t.) (3–1 p)	Newcastle United	Kingston upon Hull
19:45 GMT	Snodgrass (yellow card) 45', (goal) 99'; Robertson (yellow card) 77'; Mbokani (red card) 89'; Huddlestone (yellow card) 89'	Report	Hayden (yellow card) 63'; Gouffran (yellow card) 67'; Lascelles (yellow card) 89'; Diamé 98'	Stadium: KCOM Stadium; Attendance: 16,243; Referee: Neil Swarbrick
	Penalties
	Snodgrass (penalty scored); Dawson (penalty scored); Huddlestone (penalty scored)		Shelvey (penalty missed); Gayle (penalty missed); Atsu (penalty scored); Gouffran (penalty missed)

10 January 2017 Semi-final first leg	Manchester United	2–0	Hull City	Manchester
20:00 GMT	Mata 56'; Fellaini 87'	Report	Maguire (yellow card) 40'	Stadium: Old Trafford; Attendance: 65,798; Referee: Kevin Friend

26 January 2017 Semi-final second leg	Hull City	2–1 (2–3 agg.)	Manchester United	Kingston upon Hull
19:45 GMT	Huddlestone 35' (pen.); Niasse 85'	Report	Jones (yellow card) 11'; Pogba 66'; Rojo (yellow card) 87'	Stadium: KCOM Stadium; Attendance: 16,831; Referee: Jonathan Moss

== Statistics ==
=== Appearances ===
As of 21 May 2017.

No.	Pos	Nat	Player	Total		Premier League		FA Cup		League Cup	
No.	Pos	Nat	Player	Apps	Goals	Apps	Goals	Apps	Goals	Apps	Goals
1	GK	(Scotland) SCO	Allan McGregor	0	0	0	0	0	0	0	0
2	MF	(England) ENG	Moses Odubajo	0	0	0	0	0	0	0	0
3	DF	(Scotland) SCO	Andrew Robertson	39	1	31+2	1	2	0	3+1	0
4	DF	(Northern Ireland) NIR	Alex Bruce	0	0	0	0	0	0	0	0
5	DF	(England) ENG	Harry Maguire	36	3	25+4	2	0+1	0	6	1
6	DF	(England) ENG	Curtis Davies	29	0	25+1	0	1	0	2	0
7	MF	(Republic of Ireland) IRL	David Meyler	28	1	9+11	1	2	0	5+1	0
8	MF	(England) ENG	Tom Huddlestone	39	2	23+8	1	2	0	3+3	1
9	FW	(Uruguay) URU	Abel Hernández	30	5	17+8	4	1+1	1	1+2	0
10	MF	(Senegal) SEN	Alfred N'Diaye	15	1	15	1	0	0	0	0
11	MF	(England) ENG	Sam Clucas	41	3	36+1	3	2	0	2	0
12	GK	(Slovakia) SVK	Dušan Kuciak	1	0	0	0	0	0	1	0
13	DF	(Italy) ITA	Andrea Ranocchia	16	2	15+1	2	0	0	0	0
14	DF	(Norway) NOR	Omar Elabdellaoui	9	0	7+1	0	1	0	0	0
15	MF	(Scotland) SCO	Shaun Maloney	14	1	2+7	1	0+1	0	3+1	0
16	GK	(Switzerland) SUI	Eldin Jakupović	26	0	22	0	2	0	2	0
17	MF	(England) ENG	James Weir	3	0	0	0	0	0	1+2	0
17	FW	(Poland) POL	Kamil Grosicki	15	0	12+3	0	0	0	0	0
18	FW	(Democratic Republic of the Congo) COD	Dieumerci Mbokani	14	0	8+4	0	0	0	2	0
19	FW	(England) ENG	Will Keane	6	0	4+1	0	0	0	1	0
20	FW	(Norway) NOR	Adama Diomande	30	4	13+9	2	2	0	5+1	2
21	DF	(England) ENG	Michael Dawson	26	4	19+3	3	1	0	3	1
22	MF	(Norway) NOR	Markus Henriksen	20	1	6+9	0	1	0	3+1	1
23	GK	(Scotland) SCO	David Marshall	18	0	16	0	0	0	2	0
24	FW	(Senegal) SEN	Oumar Niasse	19	5	12+5	4	1	0	1	1
25	MF	(England) ENG	Ryan Mason	20	2	11+5	1	1	0	3	1
27	MF	(Egypt) EGY	Ahmed Elmohamady	37	0	28+5	0	0	0	3+1	0
28	DF	(England) ENG	Josh Tymon	12	1	4+1	0	0+2	1	4+1	0
29	FW	(England) ENG	Jarrod Bowen	9	0	1+6	0	0	0	2	0
31	DF	(Republic of Ireland) IRL	Brian Lenihan	0	0	0	0	0	0	0	0
32	FW	(England) ENG	Greg Luer	1	0	0	0	0	0	1	0
36	MF	(England) ENG	Greg Olley	1	0	0	0	0	0	1	0
40	MF	(Brazil) BRA	Evandro	13	1	7+4	0	1	1	0+1	0
50	MF	(Serbia) SRB	Lazar Marković	14	2	12	2	1	0	0+1	0
Players who played for Hull City but were subsequently sold by the club:
10	MF	(Scotland) SCO	Robert Snodgrass	24	9	19+1	7	1	0	2+1	2
14	MF	(England) ENG	Jake Livermore	25	1	20+1	1	1	0	3	0

- Source: Compiled from competitive match reports

Note: Appearances shown after a "+" indicate player came on during course of match.

=== Top scorers ===
Player	Number	Position	Premier	FA Cup	League Cup	Total
(Scotland) Robert Snodgrass	10	MF	7	0	2	9
(Uruguay) Abel Hernández	9	FW	4	1	0	5
(Senegal) Oumar Niasse	24	FW	4	0	1	5
(Norway) Adama Diomande	20	FW	2	0	2	4
(England) Michael Dawson	21	DF	3	0	1	4
(England) Sam Clucas	11	MF	3	0	0	3
(England) Harry Maguire	5	DF	2	0	1	3
(England) Tom Huddlestone	8	MF	1	0	1	2
(Serbia) Lazar Marković	50	MF	2	0	0	2
(England) Ryan Mason	25	FW	1	0	1	2
(Italy) Andrea Ranocchia	13	DF	2	0	0	2
(Brazil) Evandro	40	MF	0	1	0	1
(Norway) Markus Henriksen	22	FW	0	0	1	1
(England) Jake Livermore	14	MF	1	0	0	1
(Scotland) Shaun Maloney	15	FW	1	0	0	1
(Republic of Ireland) David Meyler	7	MF	1	0	0	1
(Senegal) Alfred N'Diaye	10	MF	1	0	0	1
(Scotland) Andrew Robertson	3	DF	1	0	0	1
(England) Josh Tymon	28	DF	0	1	0	1
Total			36	3	9	48

=== Disciplinary record ===
Player	Number	Position	Premier		FA Cup		League Cup		Total	
Player	Number	Position	Booked	Sent off (straight red)	Booked	Sent off (straight red)	Booked	Sent off (straight red)	Booked	Sent off (straight red)
(England) Sam Clucas	11	MF	9	1	1	0	0	0	10	1
(England) Tom Huddlestone	8	MF	5	1	1	0	1	0	7	1
(England) Jake Livermore	14	MF	3	1	0	0	1	0	4	1
(Senegal) Oumar Niasse	24	FW	3	1	0	0	0	0	3	1
(Egypt) Ahmed Elmohamady	27	MF	2	1	0	0	0	0	2	1
(Democratic Republic of the Congo) Dieumerci Mbokani	18	FW	0	0	0	0	0	1	0	1
(Senegal) Alfred N'Diaye	10	MF	7	0	0	0	0	0	7	0
(England) Harry Maguire	5	DF	5	0	1	0	1	0	7	0
(Scotland) Andrew Robertson	3	DF	5	0	0	0	1	0	6	0
(England) Curtis Davies	6	DF	4	0	0	0	1	0	5	0
(Serbia) Lazar Marković	50	MF	5	0	1	0	0	0	5	0
(England) Michael Dawson	21	DF	4	0	0	0	0	0	4	0
(England) Ryan Mason	25	MF	4	0	0	0	0	0	4	0
(Scotland) Robert Snodgrass	10	MF	3	0	0	0	1	0	4	0
(Republic of Ireland) David Meyler	7	MF	2	0	0	0	0	0	2	0
(Italy) Andrea Ranocchia	13	DF	2	0	0	0	0	0	2	0
(Norway) Adama Diomande	20	FW	1	0	0	0	0	0	1	0
(Brazil) Evandro	40	MF	1	0	0	0	0	0	1	0
(Poland) Kamil Grosicki	17	MF	1	0	0	0	0	0	1	0
(Norway) Markus Henriksen	22	FW	1	0	0	0	0	0	1	0
(England) Josh Tymon	28	DF	1	0	0	0	0	0	1	0
Total			67	5	4	0	6	1	77	6

== Kits ==
On 14 July 2016 the away kit of black with amber trim made by Umbro was revealed. On 25 July 2016 the club announced that SportPesa, the Kenyan on-line gaming company, would be the new shirt sponsor having signed a three-year deal that was the largest in the club's history. Later the same day the new home kit was on display with black and amber vertical stripes, complemented by black shorts and amber socks. A third kit, of purple cactus, was revealed on 14 October 2016 ahead of the away game against Bournemouth where it was used.

== Awards ==
The annual awards for the club saw Sam Clucas pick-up the Player of the Year and Goal of the Season, for his goal on 22 April 2017 against Watford. Harry Maguire picked up Players’ Player of the Year and Fans’ Player of the Year awards. Josh Tymon took the award for Young Player of the Year.
