= 2017–18 Hull City A.F.C. season =

English football club season

Hull City A.F.C.
2017–18 season
- Owner: Assem Allam
- Chairman: Assem Allam
- Manager: Leonid Slutsky (until 3 December); Nigel Adkins (from 7 December)
- Stadium: KCOM Stadium
- Championship: 18th
- FA Cup: Fifth round (eliminated by Chelsea)
- EFL Cup: Second round (eliminated by Doncaster Rovers)
- Top goalscorer: League: Jarrod Bowen (14); All: Jarrod Bowen (15)
- Highest home attendance: 18,026 (26 December v Derby County)
- Lowest home attendance: 13,524 (6 March v Millwall)
- Average home league attendance: 15,622
Home colours	Away colours	Third colours

The 2017–18 season was Hull City's first season back in the Championship following their relegation the last season in their 114th year in existence. Along with the Championship, the club competed in the FA Cup and EFL Cup. The season covered the period from 1 July 2017 to 30 June 2018.

== Events ==
- On 9 June 2017, the club announced the appointment of Leonid Slutsky as head coach.
- On 30 June 2017, Liam Edwards signed a one-year deal, on a free transfer from Swansea City.
- On 3 July 2017, Jonathan Edwards signed a new one-year deal with the club and was loaned to Accrington Stanley for the season.
- On 5 July 2017, Josh Tymon was released after failing to agree a new contract with the club.
- On 11 July 2017 Ola Aina of Chelsea signed a season-long loan with the club.
- On 15 July 2017, Tom Huddlestone joined Derby County for an undisclosed fee, on a two-year contract.
- On 18 July 2017, free agent Fraizer Campbell signed a two-year deal with the club.
- On 19 July 2017, Eldin Jakupović signed a three-year deal with Leicester City for an undisclosed fee.
- On 19 July 2017, Ahmed Elmohamady joined Aston Villa on a three-year contract for a fee of £1 million.
- On 21 July 2017, Andrew Robertson moved to Liverpool for an initial fee of £8 million, in a reverse move Kevin Stewart signed a three-year deal with Hull City for an undisclosed fee.
- On 26 July 2017, Ondřej Mazuch of Sparta Prague signed a two-year contract with the club after impressing in pre-season trials with the club. Also Callum Burton arrived from Shrewsbury Town signing a one-year contract for an undisclosed fee.
- On 27 July 2017, Michael Hector joined on a season-long loan from Chelsea.
- On 9 August 2017, signed Sebastian Larsson on a one-year contract following his release from Sunderland at the end of the 2016–17 season.
- On 23 August 2017, Sam Clucas signed a 4-year deal with Swansea City for an undisclosed fee, in a reverse move Stephen Kingsley signed a 3-year deal, with an optional extra year for an undisclosed fee.
- On 24 August 2017, Jon Toral signed a three-year deal with the club.
- On 29 August 2017, Nouha Dicko, of Wolverhampton Wanderers, signed a 3-year deal, with an optional extra year for an undisclosed fee.
- On 30 August 2017, Jackson Irvine, of Burton Albion, signed a 3-year deal, with an optional extra year for an undisclosed fee.
- On transfer dead-line day, 31 August 2017, Fikayo Tomori signed a season-long loan deal from Chelsea.
- In September 2017, Jarrod Bowen signed a new contract with the club that sees him stay at the club until 2020.
- On 12 October 2017, Oleg Yarovinsky was appointed Head of Club Strategy.
- On 27 October 2017, Dan Batty went on a month-long loan to FC Halifax Town.
- On 3 November 2017, Callum Burton went on a month-long loan to Salford City.
- On 8 November 2017, Josh Clackstone went on a month-long loan to FC Halifax Town.
- On 24 November 2017, Adam Curry went on a month-long loan to Boston United.
- On 28 November 2017, Will Mannion went on an emergency week-long loan to Plymouth Argyle.
- On 3 December 2017, Leonid Slutsky and Oleg Yarovinsky left the club by mutual consent after a run of bad results.
- On 7 December 2017, Nigel Adkins was appointed as head coach on an 18-month contract, Andy Crosby was appointed as his assistant.
- On 5 January 2018, Jonathan Edwards was recalled from his season-long loan to Accrington Stanley and was immediately loaned out for the remainder of the season to Woking.
- On 22 January 2018, goalkeeping coach Pat Mountain left the club for family reasons, taking up a similar position at Forest Green Rovers.
- On 26 January 2018, Barry Richardson was appointed goalkeeping coach.
- On 31 January 2018, Angus MacDonald signed from Barnsley on a two-and-a-half-year deal for an undisclosed fee.
- On 31 January 2018, Harry Wilson joined on loan from Liverpool for the remainder of the season.
- On 13 February 2018, it was announced that Ryan Mason would retire from playing, on medical grounds, with immediate effect. Mason had suffered a fractured skull that required surgery after a clash of heads with defender Gary Cahill on 22 January 2017, in a Premier League match against Chelsea.
- On 28 February 2018, Brandon Fleming moved to Gainsborough Trinity on a month-long loan.
- On 28 February 2018, Tyler Hamilton and Robbie McKenzie signed two-year contracts with the club.
- On 2 March 2018, academy player Billy Chadwick signed a professional contract with the club for one-year.
- On 16 March 2018, Ben Hinchliffe went on loan to Gainsborough Trinity until the end of April 2018.
- On 19 March 2018, Greg Luer joined Maidstone United on loan until the end of the season.
- On 18 April 2018, Brian Lenihan announced his retirement from football, and was released from his contract with the club.
- On 2 May 2018, Adama Diomande's contract was cancelled so he could join Los Angeles.
- On 16 May 2018, Allan McGregor chose not to sign a contract extension with the club, instead signing a two-year deal with Rangers.
- On 18 May 2018, Adam Curry and Lewis Ritson signed one-year deals with the club.
- On 18 May 2018, Josh Clackstone, Greg Luer, David Meyler and Greg Olley were released by the club, while Max Clark, Abel Hernández, Sebastian Larsson and Moses Odubajo were offered new deals.
- On 30 May 2018, Michael Dawson left for Nottingham Forest on a free transfer.
- On 4 June 2018, Abel Hernández left the club by mutual consent.
- On 11 June 2018, Sebastian Larsson rejected a new contract offer deciding to return to Sweden to play for AIK.
- On 22 June 2018, defender Eric Lichaj signed a two-year deal with Hull City for an undisclosed fee.
- On 22 June 2018, Max Clark was reported as joining Vitesse Arnhem at the end of his contract.

== First team squad ==
As of 11 May 2018

Note: Flags indicate national team as defined under FIFA eligibility rules; some limited exceptions apply. Players may hold more than one non-FIFA nationality.

No.	Pos.	Nation	Player
1	GK	SCO	Allan McGregor
2	DF	ENG	Moses Odubajo
3	DF	CZE	Ondřej Mazuch
4	MF	AUS	Jackson Irvine
5	DF	JAM	Michael Hector (on loan from Chelsea)
7	FW	POL	Kamil Grosicki
8	MF	IRL	David Meyler
9	FW	MLI	Nouha Dicko
10	FW	URU	Abel Hernández
11	MF	ESP	Jon Toral
12	GK	SCO	David Marshall
13	GK	ENG	Will Mannion
15	MF	BRA	Evandro
16	MF	SWE	Sebastian Larsson
17	MF	ENG	James Weir
18	MF	ENG	Dan Batty

No.	Pos.	Nation	Player
19	FW	ENG	Will Keane
20	FW	ENG	Jarrod Bowen
21	DF	ENG	Michael Dawson (captain)
22	MF	NOR	Markus Henriksen
24	DF	ENG	Max Clark
25	FW	ENG	Fraizer Campbell
26	MF	ENG	Greg Olley
27	DF	ENG	Josh Clackstone
28	DF	SCO	Stephen Kingsley
29	DF	ENG	Fikayo Tomori (on loan from Chelsea)
34	DF	NGR	Ola Aina (on loan from Chelsea)
35	MF	ENG	Kevin Stewart
36	GK	ENG	Callum Burton
49	MF	WAL	Harry Wilson (on loan from Liverpool)
50	DF	ENG	Angus MacDonald

== Transfers ==
=== Transfers in ===
Date from	Position	Nationality	Name	From	Fee	Ref.
1 July 2017	LW	(Wales)	Liam Edwards	Swansea City	Free	
18 July 2017	CF	(England)	Fraizer Campbell	Crystal Palace	Free	
21 July 2017	CM	(England)	Kevin Stewart	Liverpool	Undisclosed	
26 July 2017	CB	(Czech Republic)	Ondřej Mazuch	Sparta Prague	Undisclosed	
26 July 2017	GK	(England)	Callum Burton	Shrewsbury Town	Undisclosed	
9 August 2017	CM	(Sweden)	Sebastian Larsson	Sunderland	Free	
9 August 2017	LB	(Scotland)	Stephen Kingsley	Swansea City	Undisclosed	
24 August 2017	AM	(Spain)	Jon Toral	Arsenal	Undisclosed	
29 August 2017	CF	(Mali)	Nouha Dicko	Wolverhampton Wanderers	Undisclosed	
30 August 2017	MF	(Australia)	Jackson Irvine	Burton Albion	Undisclosed	
31 January 2018	CB	(England)	Angus MacDonald	Barnsley	Undisclosed	
22 June 2018	RB	(United States) (Poland)	Eric Lichaj	Nottingham Forest	Undisclosed	

=== Transfers out ===
Date from	Position	Nationality	Name	To	Fee	Ref.
1 July 2017	CB	(Northern Ireland)	Alex Bruce	Free agent	Released	
1 July 2017	CB	(England)	Curtis Davies	Derby County	Undisclosed	
1 July 2017	ST	(England)	Luke Lofts	Free agent	Released	
1 July 2017	CB	(England)	Harry Maguire	Leicester City	Undisclosed (Note: Fee reported as £12,000,000, rising to £17,000,000)	
1 July 2017	CB	(England)	Bradley Maslen-Jones	Free agent	Released	
1 July 2017	RB	(England)	Harvey Rodgers	Fleetwood Town	Free	
1 July 2017	ST	(England)	Johan Ter Horst	Maidstone United	Released	(Note: Johan Ter Horst joined Maidstone United following his release.)
5 July 2017	LB	(England)	Josh Tymon	Stoke City	Rejected contract	(Note: Josh Tymon joined Stoke City following his departure.)
15 July 2017	DM	(England)	Tom Huddlestone	Derby County	Undisclosed (Note: Fee reported as £2,000,000)	
19 July 2017	GK	(Switzerland)	Eldin Jakupović	Leicester City	Undisclosed	
19 July 2017	RW	(Egypt)	Ahmed Elmohamady	Aston Villa	£1,000,000	
21 July 2017	LB	(Scotland)	Andrew Robertson	Liverpool	Undisclosed (Note: Fee reported as £8,000,000, rising to £10,000,000)	
23 August 2017	CM	(England)	Sam Clucas	Swansea City	Undisclosed	
13 February 2018	CM	(England)	Ryan Mason	Retired	n/a	
2 May 2018	FW	(Norway)	Adama Diomande	Los Angeles	Free	
16 May 2018	GK	(Scotland)	Allan McGregor	Rangers	Free	
18 May 2018	DF	(England)	Josh Clackstone		Released	
18 May 2018	FW	(England)	Greg Luer		Released	
18 May 2018	MF	(Republic of Ireland)	David Meyler		Released	
18 May 2018	MF	(England)	Greg Olley		Released	
30 May 2018	CB	(England)	Michael Dawson	Nottingham Forest	Free transfer	
4 June 2018	CF	(Uruguay)	Abel Hernández	Free agent	Mutual consent	
11 June 2018	MF	(Sweden)	Sebastian Larsson	AIK	Free transfer	
22 June 2018	LB	(England)	Max Clark	Vitesse Arnhem	Compensation	

=== Loans in ===
Start date	Position	Nationality	Name	From	End date	Ref.
11 July 2017	RB	(Nigeria)	Ola Aina	Chelsea	30 June 2018	
27 July 2017	CB	(Jamaica)	Michael Hector	Chelsea	30 June 2018	
31 August 2017	DF	(England)	Fikayo Tomori	Chelsea	30 June 2018	
31 January 2018	MF	(Wales)	Harry Wilson	Liverpool	30 June 2018	

=== Loans out ===
Start date	Position	Nationality	Name	To	End date	Ref.
3 July 2017	CF	(England)	Jonathan Edwards	Accrington Stanley	5 January 2018	
27 October 2017	CM	(England)	Dan Batty	FC Halifax Town	26 November 2017	
3 November 2017	GK	(England)	Callum Burton	Salford City	3 December 2017	
8 November 2017	DF	(England)	Josh Clackstone	FC Halifax Town	8 December 2017	
24 November 2017	DF	(England)	Adam Curry	Boston United	24 December 2017	
28 November 2017	GK	(England)	Will Mannion	Plymouth Argyle	4 December 2017	
5 January 2018	CF	(England)	Jonathan Edwards	Woking	30 June 2018	
28 February 2018	MF	(England)	Brandon Fleming	Gainsborough Trinity	28 March 2018	
16 March 2018	FW	(England)	Ben Hinchliffe	Gainsborough Trinity	30 April 2018	
19 March 2018	FW	(England)	Greg Luer	Maidstone United	30 June 2018	

== Pre-season ==
On 6 July 2017 Hull City announced five pre-season friendlies against Oxford United, Bristol Rovers, both in Portugal, Nantes, Benfica and Ajax.

The players returned to pre-season training on 3 July 2017. On 11 July 2017 the team travelled to Portugal for a 12-day training camp.

Win Draw Loss

15 July 2017	Oxford United	2–1	Hull City	Albufeira, Portugal
18:30 WEST	Thomas 32', 52'	Report	Diomande 74'	Stadium: Estadio da Nora

18 July 2017	Bristol Rovers	1–2	Hull City	Albufeira, Portugal
18:30 WEST	Gaffney 51'	Report	Hernández 67'; Bowen 87'	Stadium: Estadio da Nora

22 July 2017	Benfica	0–1	Hull City	Algarve, Portugal
20:30 WEST		Report	Bowen 59'	Stadium: Estádio Algarve

25 July 2017	Hull City	0–0	Nantes	Kingston upon Hull
19:30 BST		Report		Stadium: Craven Park

28 July 2017	Ajax	3–3	Hull City	Ouder-Amstel, Netherlands
14:00 CEST	Dawson 7' (o.g.); Huntelaar 17'; Černý 54'	Report	Henriksen 5'; Batty 77'; Weir 85'	Stadium: Sportpark De Toekomst

== Competitions ==
=== Overall ===
Competition	Started round	Current position / round	Final position / round	First match	Last match
Championship	—	—	18th	5 August 2017	6 May 2018
League Cup	Second round	—	Second round	22 August 2017	22 August 2017
FA Cup	Third round	—	Fifth round	6 January 2018	16 February 2018

Updated to match played 6 May 2018
Source: Competitions

=== Championship ===
==== League table ====
Pos	Team	Pld	W	D	L	GF	GA	GD	Pts
16	Queens Park Rangers	46	15	11	20	58	70	−12	56
17	Nottingham Forest	46	15	8	23	51	65	−14	53
18	Hull City	46	11	16	19	70	70	0	49
19	Birmingham City	46	13	7	26	38	68	−30	46
20	Reading	46	10	14	22	48	70	−22	44

Source: English Football League
Rules for classification: 1) Points; 2) Goal difference; 3) Number of goals scored

==== Result summary ====
Overall								Home						Away					
Pld	W	D	L	GF	GA	GD	Pts	W	D	L	GF	GA	GD	W	D	L	GF	GA	GD
46	11	16	19	70	70	0	49	7	8	8	41	32	+9	4	8	11	29	38	−9

Last updated: 6 May 2018.

==== Results by matchday ====
Matchday	1	2	3	4	5	6	7	8	9	10	11	12	13	14	15	16	17	18	19	20	21	22	23	24	25	26	27	28	29	30	31	32	33	34	35	36	37	38	39	40	41	42	43	44	45	46
Ground	A	H	H	A	H	A	A	H	A	H	H	A	A	H	H	A	H	A	H	A	H	A	A	H	H	A	H	A	H	A	A	A	H	H	H	H	A	A	H	A	H	A	H	A	H	A
Result	D	W	L	L	W	L	L	D	D	L	W	D	W	L	L	L	D	D	L	D	W	L	L	D	D	L	D	L	D	L	W	L	W	D	L	W	W	L	D	D	W	W	L	D	L	D
Position	13	5	7	14	6	9	16	17	17	17	17	15	14	17	17	20	20	20	20	20	18	19	19	19	19	21	20	21	21	22	21	21	20	20	20	18	17	18	18	18	18	16	18	18	18	18

Updated to match(es) played on 6 May 2018. Source: Statto.com
A = Away; H = Home; W = Win; D = Draw; L = Loss

==== Matches ====
The fixtures for the season were announced on 21 June 2017. Hull start the season with a trip to Aston Villa, run by former manager Steve Bruce, on 5 August 2017. The season will close on 6 May 2018 with an away match at Brentford.

Win Draw Loss Postponed

5 August 2017 1	Aston Villa	1–1	Hull City	Aston, Birmingham
17:30 BST	Agbonlahor 7'; Lansbury (yellow card) 17'; Whelan (yellow card) 22'	Report	Bowen 62'	Stadium: Villa Park; Attendance: 31,241; Referee: Andrew Madley

12 August 2017 2	Hull City	4–1	Burton Albion	Kingston upon Hull
15:00 BST	Hernández 7', 54', 68'; Grosicki 51'; Henriksen (yellow card) 59'; Campbell (yellow card) 72'	Report	Irvine (yellow card) 29' (yellow-red card) 38', (goal) 33'; Naylor (yellow card) 45+2'	Stadium: KCOM Stadium; Attendance: 14,882; Referee: Darren England

15 August 2017 3	Hull City	2–3	Wolverhampton Wanderers	Kingston upon Hull
19:45 BST	Dawson 27', (yellow card) 90+2'; Campbell (yellow card) 70'; Meyler 90+10' (pen.)	Report	Neves 6', (yellow card) 68'; Jota 43', (yellow card) 54'; Saïss (yellow card) 48'; Dicko 90'; Cavaleiro (yellow card) 90+4'	Stadium: KCOM Stadium; Attendance: 17,145; Referee: Jeremy Simpson

19 August 2017 4	Queens Park Rangers	2–1	Hull City	Shepherd's Bush, London
15:00 BST	Smith 74', (yellow card) 90+7'; Perch (yellow card) 82'; Sylla 90+1', (yellow card) 90+2'	Report	Bowen 35'; Meyler (yellow card) 56'; Larsson (yellow card) 60'; McGregor (yellow card) 87'	Stadium: Loftus Road; Attendance: 12,609; Referee: James Linington

25 August 2017 5	Hull City	4–0	Bolton Wanderers	Kingston upon Hull
19:45 BST	Meyler (yellow card) 11'; Diomande 13'; Bowen 19', 88'; Grosicki 29'	Report	Cullen (yellow card) 50'; Derik (yellow card) 74'	Stadium: KCOM Stadium; Attendance: 16,207; Referee: Oliver Langford

8 September 2017 6	Derby County	5–0	Hull City	Derby
19:45 BST	Vydra 15', 34'; Davies 38'; Johnson 45', 58'	Report	Larsson (penalty missed) 27'	Stadium: Pride Park Stadium; Attendance: 25,107; Referee: Darren Bond

13 September 2017 7	Fulham	2–1	Hull City	Fulham, London
19:45 BST	Ayité 42'; Johansen 62'	Report	Bowen 54'	Stadium: Craven Cottage; Attendance: 15,792; Referee: Tim Robinson

16 September 2017 8	Hull City	1–1	Sunderland	Kingston upon Hull
15:00 BST	Grosicki (yellow card) 43'; Meyler 82'; Tomori (yellow card) 90'	Report	Vaughan 17', (yellow card) 18'; Williams (yellow card) 74'; Oviedo (yellow card) 75'; Rodwell (yellow card) 77'; Gooch (yellow card) 90'	Stadium: KCOM Stadium; Attendance: 16,597; Referee: Darren England

23 September 2017 9	Reading	1–1	Hull City	Reading
15:00 BST	Böðvarsson 87'	Report	Campbell 28'	Stadium: Madejski Stadium; Attendance: 15,749; Referee: Steve Martin

26 September 2017 10	Hull City	1–2	Preston North End	Kingston upon Hull
19:45 BST	Larson (yellow card) 24'; Dawson (yellow card) 36'; McGregor (yellow card) 37'; Campbell (yellow card) 37'; Bowen 50'	Report	Barkhuizen 37'; Fisher (yellow card) 61'; Robinson 88'; Johnson (yellow card) 90+2'	Stadium: KCOM Stadium; Attendance: 15,443; Referee: James Linnington

30 September 2017 11	Hull City	6–1	Birmingham City	Kingston upon Hull
15:00 BST	Campbell 7'; Meyler 11' (pen.); Bowen 26'; Grosicki 72'; Henriksen 76'; Larsson 87'	Report	Gallagher 90+1'	Stadium: KCOM Stadium; Attendance: 15,608; Referee: Scott Duncan

14 October 2017 12	Norwich City	1–1	Hull City	Norwich
15:00 BST	Wildschut (yellow card) 45+1'; Oliveira 90+6'	Report	Meyler (yellow card) 24' (yellow-red card) 57'; Dicko 29'; Larsson (yellow card) 57'; Stewart (yellow card) 74'; Hector (yellow card) 90+4'	Stadium: Carrow Road; Attendance: 25,666; Referee: Keith Stroud

21 October 2017 13	Barnsley	0–1	Hull City	Barnsley
15:00 BST	McGeehan (yellow card) 55'	Report	Stewart (yellow card) 29'; Campbell 78', (yellow card) 83'; McGregor (yellow card) 90+2'	Stadium: Oakwell; Attendance: 13,624; Referee: Peter Bankes

28 October 2017 14	Hull City	2–3	Nottingham Forest	Kingston upon Hull
17:30 BST	Larsson (yellow card) 61'; Irvine (yellow card) 64'; Dawson (yellow card) 68'; Clark (yellow card) 71'; Bowen 76'; Hector 88'	Report	Vaughan (yellow card) 24'; Dowell 29', 71', 83' (pen.); Jamie Ward (yellow card) 86'; Walker (yellow card) 90+1'	Stadium: KCOM Stadium; Attendance: 15,780; Referee: Jeremy Simpson

31 October 2017 15	Hull City	1–3	Middlesbrough	Kingston upon Hull
19:45 GMT	Grosicki 72', (yellow card) 90+1'; Hector (red card) 83'; Irvine (yellow card) 90+1'	Report	Braithwaite 13'; Assombalonga 36'; Ayala (yellow card) 56'; Howson (yellow card) 81'; Leadbitter 85' (pen.)	Stadium: KCOM Stadium; Attendance: 15,454; Referee: Tim Robinson

4 November 2017 16	Sheffield United	4–1	Hull City	Sheffield
15:00 GMT	Clarke (yellow card) 23' (goal) 53', 76', 80', 88'	Report	Grosicki 29'; Aina (yellow card) 39'; Campbell (yellow card) 42'	Stadium: Bramall Lane; Attendance: 27,466; Referee: Darren Bond

18 November 2017 17	Hull City	2–2	Ipswich Town	Kingston upon Hull
15:00 GMT	Bowen 34', (yellow card) 54'; Larsson (yellow card) 46'; Dicko 51'; Stewart (yellow card) 90+1'	Report	McGoldrick 6'; Webster (yellow card) 40'; Connolly (yellow card) 58'; Garner (yellow card) 64'; Knudsen (yellow card) 67'; Spence 88'; Ward (yellow card) 90+1'	Stadium: KCOM Stadium; Attendance: 15,516; Referee: David Coote

21 November 2017 18	Millwall	0–0	Hull City	Bermondsey, London
19:45 GMT	McLaughlin (yellow card) 57'	Report	Irvine (yellow card) 56'; Campbell (yellow card) 71'	Stadium: The Den; Attendance: 9,817; Referee: Jeremy Simpson

25 November 2017 19	Hull City	2–3	Bristol City	Kingston upon Hull
15:00 GMT	Tomori (yellow card) 8'; Campbell 33'; Bowen 61'	Report	Pack (yellow card) 6'; Flint (yellow card) 58', (goal) 68'; Reid 79'; Brownhill 89'	Stadium: KCOM Stadium; Attendance: 14,762; Referee: Robert Jones

2 December 2017 20	Sheffield Wednesday	2–2	Hull City	Owlerton, Sheffield
15:00 GMT	van Aken (yellow card) 35'; Hooper (yellow card) 45+1', (goal) 70', 85'; Reach (yellow card) 48'	Report	Campbell 21'; Stewart (yellow card) 52'; Larsson (yellow card) 71'; Dawson 90+5'	Stadium: Hillsborough Stadium; Attendance: 25,412; Referee: Mike Jones

9 December 2017 21	Hull City	3–2	Brentford	Kingston upon Hull
15:00 GMT	Grosicki 54'; Larsson 70'; Irvine 75'; Aina (yellow card) 79'; Luer (yellow card) 90+8'; Toral (yellow card) 90+10'	Report	Meyler 47' (o.g.); Egan 87', (yellow card) 90+1'; Maupay (yellow card) 90+10'	Stadium: KCOM Stadium; Attendance: 14,620; Referee: Simon Hooper

16 December 2017 22	Cardiff City	1–0	Hull City	Cardiff
17:30 GMT	Bamba (yellow card) 51', (goal) 57'	Report		Stadium: Cardiff City Stadium; Attendance: 18,049; Referee: Scott Duncan

23 December 2017 23	Leeds United	1–0	Hull City	Beeston, Leeds
15:00 GMT	Hernandez 29'	Report	Dawson (yellow card) 82'; Hector (yellow card) 89'	Stadium: Elland Road; Attendance: 35,156; Referee: Steve Martin

26 December 2017 24	Hull City	0–0	Derby County	Kingston upon Hull
15:00 GMT	Hector (yellow card) 28'; Larsson (yellow card) 35'	Report	Johnson (yellow card) 11'; Ledley (yellow card) 72'; Baird (yellow card) 90'	Stadium: KCOM Stadium; Attendance: 18,026; Referee: Tony Harrington

30 December 2017 25	Hull City	2–2	Fulham	Kingston upon Hull
15:00 GMT	Bowen 32'; Dicko 36'	Report	Kamara 48' (pen.), 85'; McDonald (yellow card) 76'	Stadium: KCOM Stadium; Attendance: 15,701; Referee: David Webb

1 January 2018 26	Bolton Wanderers	1–0	Hull City	Horwich
15:00 GMT	Madine 20'; Vela (yellow card) 71'; Alnwick (yellow card) 87'; Le Fondre (yellow card) 90+4'	Report	Henriksen (yellow card) 71'; Dawson (yellow card) 78'; Campbell (yellow card) 80'	Stadium: Macron Stadium; Attendance: 14,216; Referee: Geoff Eltringham

13 January 2018 27	Hull City	0–0	Reading	Kingston upon Hull
15:00 GMT	Larsson (yellow card) 89'	Report		Stadium: KCOM Stadium; Attendance: 14,300; Referee: Darren England

20 January 2018 28	Sunderland	1–0	Hull City	Sunderland
15:00 GMT	Asoro 20', (yellow card) 78'; Browning (yellow card) 58'; Gooch (yellow card) 90'; Cattermole (yellow card) 90+2'	Report	Dawson (yellow card) 74'; Larsson (yellow card) 81'	Stadium: Stadium of Light; Attendance: 27,437; Referee: Keith Stroud

30 January 2018 29	Hull City	0–0	Leeds United	Kingston upon Hull
19:45 GMT	Henriksen (yellow card) 42'; Aina (yellow card) 44'; Irvine (yellow card) 62'; Mazuch (yellow card) 65'; Campbell (yellow card) 90+6'	Report	Jansson (yellow card) 31'	Stadium: KCOM Stadium; Attendance: 17,237; Referee: Tony Harrington

3 February 2018 30	Preston North End	2–1	Hull City	Deepdale, Preston
15:00 GMT	Cunningham 36'; Bodin (yellow card) 41'; Browne 45+1' (pen.); Pearson (yellow card) 66'	Report	Bowen 29'; Clark (yellow card) 90+5'	Stadium: Deepdale; Attendance: 11,605; Referee: Steve Martin

10 February 2018 31	Nottingham Forest	0–2	Hull City	Nottingham
15:00 GMT	Fox (yellow card) 41'	Report	Toral 9'; Wilson 38'; Larsson (yellow card) 60'	Stadium: City Ground; Attendance: 23,098; Referee: Oliver Langford

20 February 2018 32	Middlesbrough	3–1	Hull City	Middlesbrough
19:45 GMT	Gestede 16', 58', (yellow card) 35'; Bamford 45'	Report	Evandro 41'; Dawson (yellow card) 88'	Stadium: Riverside Stadium; Attendance: 23,111; Referee: Andrew Madley

23 February 2018 33	Hull City	1–0	Sheffield United	Kingston upon Hull
19:45 GMT	Irvine (yellow card) 16'; Dicko 55'	Report		Stadium: KCOM Stadium; Attendance: 15,213; Referee: Simon Hooper

27 February 2018 34	Hull City	1–1	Barnsley	Kingston upon Hull
19:45 GMT	MacDonald (yellow card) 47'; Clark (yellow card) 48'; McGregor (yellow card) 67'; Dawson 73'; Campbell (yellow card) 90+2'	Report	McBurnie 22'; Lindsay (yellow card) 51'; Cavaré (yellow card) 71'	Stadium: KCOM Stadium; Attendance: 14,005; Referee: Mike Jones

3 March 2018 –	Ipswich Town	P–P	Hull City	Ipswich
15:00 GMT		Report		Stadium: Portman Road

6 March 2018 35	Hull City	1–2	Millwall	Kingston upon Hull
19:45 GMT	Dawson (yellow card) 36'; Henriksen (yellow card) 42'; Hernández 79'	Report	Saville 1'; Cooper 33'; Wallace (yellow card) 45'; Cahill (yellow card) 76'; Romeo (yellow card) 79'; Morison (yellow card) 85'	Stadium: KCOM Stadium; Attendance: 13,524; Referee: David Coote

10 March 2018 36	Hull City	4–3	Norwich City	Kingston upon Hull
15:00 GMT	Irvine 6'; Hernández 41' (pen.), 48' (pen.); Larsson (yellow card) 56'; Wilson 71'; Clark (yellow card) 87'	Report	Maddison 18' (pen.), 19', 39' (pen.); Watkins (yellow card) 20'; Pinto (yellow card) 31'; Tettey (yellow card) 49'	Stadium: KCOM Stadium; Attendance: 15,120; Referee: Tim Robinson

13 March 2018 37	Ipswich Town	0–3	Hull City	Ipswich
19:45 GMT	Celina (yellow card) 44'	Report	Henriksen 18'; Wilson 40'; Bowen 47'	Stadium: Portman Road; Attendance: 13,031; Referee: Jeremy Simpson

17 March 2018 38	Birmingham City	3–0	Hull City	Birmingham
15:00 GMT	Harding (yellow card) 10'; Jota 12', 59'; Adams 48'	Report		Stadium: St Andrew's; Attendance: 22,970; Referee: Tony Harrington

31 March 2018 39	Hull City	0–0	Aston Villa	Kingston upon Hull
17:30 BST	Larsson (yellow card) 56'	Report	Snodgrass (yellow card) 32'; Grabban (yellow card) 81'	Stadium: KCOM Stadium; Attendance: 16,133; Referee: Andy Davies

3 April 2018 40	Wolverhampton Wanderers	2–2	Hull City	Wolverhampton
19:45 BST	Jota 18' (pen.); Buur 83'	Report	Toral (yellow card) 9'; Meyler 37' (pen.); Bennett 78' (o.g.); Campbell (yellow card) 79'; Tomori (yellow card) 87'	Stadium: Molineux Stadium; Attendance: 29,718; Referee: Darren England

7 April 2018 41	Hull City	4–0	Queens Park Rangers	Kingston upon Hull
15:00 BST	Bowen (yellow card) 30'; Wilson 42'; Smithies 45+4' (o.g.); Grosicki 62'; Hernández 69'; Irvine (yellow card) 81'; Henriksen (yellow card) 90+1'	Report	Bidwell (yellow card) 30'; Onuoha (red card) 90'; Scowen (yellow card) 90+1'	Stadium: KCOM Stadium; Attendance: 14,181; Referee: Geoff Eltringham

10 April 2018 42	Burton Albion	0–5	Hull City	Burton upon Trent
19:45 BST		Report	Wilson 5'; Grosicki 33', 85', (yellow card) 90+2'; Henriksen (yellow card) 48'; Meyler 63' (pen.); Keane 90+3'	Stadium: Pirelli Stadium; Attendance: 3,659; Referee: Peter Bankes

14 April 2018 43	Hull City	0–1	Sheffield Wednesday	Kingston upon Hull
15:00 BST	Hector (yellow card) 40'	Report	Rhodes 18'; Palmer (yellow card) 70'	Stadium: KCOM Stadium; Attendance: 16,417; Referee: Scott Duncan

21 April 2018 44	Bristol City	5–5	Hull City	Bristol
15:00 BST	Pisano (yellow card) 19'; Pack 37'; Diédhiou 40', 53'; Reid 64'; Bryan 90+4'	Report	Wilson 16', 72'; Fielding 56' (o.g.); Henriksen (yellow card) 64'; Larsson (yellow card) 79'; Hernández 80'; Campbell 87'; MacDonald (yellow card) 89'; McGregor (yellow card) 90+9'	Stadium: Ashton Gate Stadium; Attendance: 21,136; Referee: Oliver Langford

28 April 2018 45	Hull City	0–2	Cardiff City	Kingston upon Hull
15:00 BST	Kingsley (yellow card) 3'; Henriksen (yellow card) 45'; Meyler (yellow card) 70'	Report	Grujić (yellow card) 30'; Morrison 32', 80'; Ralls (yellow card) 60'	Stadium: KCOM Stadium; Attendance: 17,441; Referee: Andy Davies

6 May 2018 46	Brentford	1–1	Hull City	Brentford
12:30 BST	Canós 12'	Report	Bowen 45+2'	Stadium: Griffin Park; Attendance: 11,475; Referee: James Linington

=== EFL Cup ===
Hull City enter the competition in the second-round. The draw for the second-round took place on 10 August 2017, and Hull were drawn away to Doncaster Rovers. The match was played on 22 August 2017 at the Keepmoat Stadium and Hull fielded a mainly Academy side for the match. The first half produced no goals and it was Alfie May who broke the deadlock just after the restart for Doncaster. Tommy Rowe doubled Doncaster's lead 6-minutes later with Hull failing to make any reply. Hull City were knocked out at the Second round stage losing 2–0 on the night.

Win Draw Loss

22 August 2017 Second	Doncaster Rovers	2–0	Hull City	Doncaster
19:45 BST	May 48'; Rowe 54'	Report (Note: The report is inconsistent on yellow cards issued between the "Line-ups" and "Live Text" tabs.)	Clackstone (yellow card); Greg Olley (yellow card); Batty (yellow card) 86'	Stadium: Keepmoat Stadium; Attendance: 7,139; Referee: Graham Salisbury

=== FA Cup ===
Hull City entered the competition in the third-round, the draw for which took place on 4 December 2017. Hull were drawn away to either Blackburn Rovers or Crewe Alexandra, who drew their second-round match 3–3. The replay was scheduled for 12 December 2017 but was put back 24-hours because of adverse weather conditions. Blackburn Rovers beat Crewe Alexandra by a single goal, by former City player Danny Graham, to progress to play Hull City.

The match against Blackburn Rovers, took place on 6 January 2018 at Ewood Park, in what the BBC described as an "uneventful" match. The only goal coming in the 58th minute when Ola Aina headed in a Jon Toral corner to take Hull through to the next round.

The draw for the fourth-round took place on 8 January 2018, and Hull were drawn at home to fellow Championship side Nottingham Forest, with the match taking place on 27 January 2018. Jarrod Bowen hit the post for Hull after 17-minutes, but was on the scoreboard a minute later when his shot hit the top corner of the goal. Nouha Dicko double the score when he headed in from close range after 40-minutes. With a couple of minutes of normal-time remaining Apostolos Vellios pegged one back for Forest, but they could not find another goal. Hull progressed to the Fifth round with a 2–1 victory.

The draw for the fifth-round took place on 29 January 2018, and Hull were drawn away to Chelsea. The match was later set for 16 February 2018, and would be using the Video Assistant Referee system. Hull wore shirts sporting a logo remembering the 50th anniversary of the Hull triple trawler tragedy, these were presented to charities involved with creating a memorial to the tragedy before the Millwall match on 6 March 2018. Willian got the game off to a good start for Chelsea by scoring after 2-minutes. Pedro doubled the score after 27-minutes. Willian was in the action again 5-minutes later with his second goal and Olivier Giroud got Chelsea's fourth just before the break. In the second half Harry Wilson was fouled in the penalty area by Cesc Fàbregas. David Meyler took the spot-kick for Hull, but this was saved by Willy Caballero. Both teams had chances to score in the second-half but the score remained 4–0 to Chelsea.

Win Draw Loss

6 January 2018 Third	Blackburn Rovers	0–1	Hull City	Blackburn, Lancashire
15:00 GMT	Williams (yellow card) 30'; Tomlinson (yellow card) 44'	Report	Aina 58', (yellow card) 71'	Stadium: Ewood Park; Attendance: 6,777; Referee: Oliver Langford

27 January 2018 Fourth	Hull City	2–1	Nottingham Forest	Kingston upon Hull
15:00 GMT	Bowen 18'; Dicko 40'; Mazuch (yellow card) 90+4'	Report	Fox (yellow card) 25'; Vellios 88'; Worrall (yellow card) 90+5'	Stadium: KCOM Stadium; Attendance: 13,450; Referee: Stuart Attwell

16 February 2018 Fifth	Chelsea	4–0	Hull City	Fulham, London
20:00 GMT	Willian 2', 32'; Pedro 27'; Giroud 42'; Scott (yellow card) 82'	Report	Stewart (yellow card) 33'; Irvine (yellow card) 86'	Stadium: Stamford Bridge; Attendance: 39,591; Referee: Andre Marriner

== Statistics ==
=== Appearances ===
As of 6 May 2018.

No.	Pos	Nat	Player	Total		Championship		FA Cup		League Cup	
No.	Pos	Nat	Player	Apps	Goals	Apps	Goals	Apps	Goals	Apps	Goals
1	GK	(Scotland) SCO	Allan McGregor	44	0	44	0	0	0	0	0
2	DF	(England) ENG	Moses Odubajo	0	0	0	0	0	0	0	0
3	DF	(Czech Republic) CZE	Ondřej Mazuch	15	0	10+4	0	1	0	0	0
4	MF	(Australia) AUS	Jackson Irvine	37	2	28+6	2	2+1	0	0	0
5	DF	(Jamaica) JAM	Michael Hector	38	1	33+3	1	2	0	0	0
6	MF	(England) ENG	Ryan Mason	0	0	0	0	0	0	0	0
7	FW	(Poland) POL	Kamil Grosicki	38	9	22+15	9	0+1	0	0	0
8	MF	(Republic of Ireland) IRL	David Meyler	27	5	17+8	5	1+1	0	0	0
9	FW	(Mali) MLI	Nouha Dicko	31	5	19+10	4	2	1	0	0
10	FW	(Uruguay) URU	Abel Hernández	10	8	8+2	8	0	0	0	0
11	MF	(Spain) ESP	Jon Toral	29	1	16+11	1	1+1	0	0	0
12	GK	(Scotland) SCO	David Marshall	5	0	2	0	3	0	0	0
13	GK	(England) ENG	Will Mannion	1	0	0	0	0	0	1	0
14	FW	(Norway) NOR	Adama Diomande	19	1	3+13	1	3	0	0	0
15	MF	(Brazil) BRA	Evandro	10	1	3+5	1	2	0	0	0
16	MF	(Sweden) SWE	Sebastian Larsson	40	2	37+3	2	0	0	0	0
17	MF	(England) ENG	James Weir	4	0	0+3	0	0	0	1	0
18	MF	(England) ENG	Dan Batty	4	0	1	0	0+2	0	1	0
19	FW	(England) ENG	Will Keane	10	1	3+6	1	0+1	0	0	0
20	FW	(England) ENG	Jarrod Bowen	44	15	37+5	14	2	1	0	0
21	DF	(England) ENG	Michael Dawson	41	3	40	3	1	0	0	0
22	MF	(Norway) NOR	Markus Henriksen	33	2	25+6	2	2	0	0	0
23	FW	(England) ENG	Greg Luer	2	0	0+1	0	0	0	1	0
24	DF	(England) ENG	Max Clark	30	0	25+2	0	3	0	0	0
25	FW	(England) ENG	Fraizer Campbell	38	6	23+13	6	0+2	0	0	0
26	MF	(England) ENG	Greg Olley	1	0	0	0	0	0	1	0
27	DF	(England) ENG	Josh Clackstone	1	0	0	0	0	0	1	0
28	DF	(Scotland) SCO	Stephen Kingsley	11	0	10+1	0	0	0	0	0
29	DF	(England) ENG	Fikayo Tomori	27	0	23+2	0	1	0	1	0
30	DF	(Republic of Ireland) IRL	Brian Lenihan	1	0	0	0	0	0	1	0
31	MF	(Scotland) SCO	Will Annan	1	0	0	0	0	0	1	0
32	MF	(England) ENG	Tyler Hamilton	1	0	0	0	0	0	1	0
33	MF	(England) ENG	Brandon Fleming	1	0	0	0	0	0	1	0
34	DF	(Nigeria) NGR	Ola Aina	46	1	42+2	0	2	1	0	0
35	MF	(England) ENG	Kevin Stewart	20	0	10+7	0	3	0	0	0
36	GK	(England) ENG	Callum Burton	0	0	0	0	0	0	0	0
37	MF	(England) ENG	Robbie McKenzie	1	0	0	0	0	0	1	0
40	FW	(England) ENG	Ben Hinchliffe	1	0	0	0	0	0	0+1	0
41	MF	(England) ENG	Ellis Barkworth	1	0	0	0	0	0	0+1	0
49	MF	(Wales) WAL	Harry Wilson	14	7	11+2	7	1	0	0	0
50	DF	(England) ENG	Angus MacDonald	13	0	12	0	1	0	0	0
Players who played for Hull City but subsequently left the club:
11	MF	(England) ENG	Sam Clucas	3	0	3	0	0	0	0	0

- Source: Compiled from competitive match reports

Note: Appearances shown after a "+" indicate player came on during course of match.

=== Top scorers ===
Player	Number	Position	Championship	FA Cup	League Cup	Total
(England) Jarrod Bowen	20	FW	14	1	0	15
(Poland) Kamil Grosicki	7	FW	9	0	0	9
(Uruguay) Abel Hernández	10	FW	8	0	0	8
(Wales) Harry Wilson	49	MF	7	0	0	7
(England) Fraizer Campbell	25	FW	6	0	0	6
(Mali) Nouha Dicko	9	FW	4	1	0	5
(Republic of Ireland) David Meyler	8	MF	5	0	0	5
(England) Michael Dawson	21	DF	3	0	0	3
(Norway) Markus Henriksen	22	MF	2	0	0	2
(Australia) Jackson Irvine	4	MF	2	0	0	2
(Sweden) Sebastian Larsson	16	FW	2	0	0	2
(Nigeria) Ola Aina	34	DF	0	1	0	1
(Norway) Adama Diomande	14	FW	1	0	0	1
(Brazil) Evandro	15	MF	1	0	0	1
(Jamaica) Michael Hector	5	DF	1	0	0	1
(England) Will Keane	19	FW	1	0	0	1
(Spain) Jon Toral	11	MF	1	0	0	1
Total			67	3	0	70

=== Disciplinary record ===
Player	Number	Position	Championship		FA Cup		League Cup		Total	
Player	Number	Position	Yellow card	Red card	Yellow card	Red card	Yellow card	Red card	Yellow card	Red card
(Jamaica) Michael Hector	5	DF	4	1	0	0	0	0	4	1
(Republic of Ireland) David Meyler	8	MF	4	1	0	0	0	0	4	1
(Sweden) Sebastian Larsson	16	MF	13	0	0	0	0	0	13	0
(England) Fraizer Campbell	25	FW	10	0	0	0	0	0	10	0
(England) Michael Dawson	21	DF	8	0	0	0	0	0	8	0
(Norway) Markus Henriksen	22	MF	8	0	0	0	0	0	8	0
(Australia) Jackson Irvine	4	MF	6	0	1	0	0	0	7	0
(Scotland) Allan McGregor	1	GK	5	0	0	0	0	0	5	0
(England) Kevin Stewart	35	MF	4	0	1	0	0	0	5	0
(Nigeria) Ola Aina	34	DF	3	0	1	0	0	0	4	0
(England) Max Clark	24	DF	4	0	0	0	0	0	4	0
(Poland) Kamil Grosicki	7	FW	3	0	0	0	0	0	3	0
(England) Fikayo Tomori	29	DF	3	0	0	0	0	0	3	0
(England) Jarrod Bowen	20	FW	2	0	0	0	0	0	2	0
(England) Angus MacDonald	50	DF	2	0	0	0	0	0	2	0
(Czech Republic) Ondřej Mazuch	3	DF	1	0	1	0	0	0	2	0
(Spain) Jon Toral	11	MF	2	0	0	0	0	0	2	0
(England) Dan Batty	18	MF	0	0	0	0	1	0	1	0
(England) Josh Clackstone	27	DF	0	0	0	0	1	0	1	0
(England) Greg Luer	23	FW	1	0	0	0	0	0	1	0
(Scotland) Stephen Kingsley	28	DF	1	0	0	0	0	0	1	0
(England) Greg Olley	26	MF	0	0	0	0	1	0	1	0
Total			84	2	4	0	3	0	91	2

== Kits ==
The home kit for the 2017–18 season was unveiled on 6 July 2017 at the Streetlife Museum of Transport. Manufactured by Umbro, the shirt is a traditional black and amber vertical striped design, complemented by black shorts and amber socks with a black band. Details of the away kit were announced on 31 July 2017, which is mainly white with an amber stripe down the shirt sleeve and an amber band round the socks. The third kit was revealed on 11 September 2017, which is described as navy peony with amber details. The third kit was used for the first time on 21 October 2017 for the match away to Barnsley.

== Awards ==
The annual awards for the club took place on 8 May 2018 and saw Jarrod Bowen pick-up the Players' Player of the Year and Supporters' Player of the Year awards. Kamil Grosicki was presented with the Goal of the Season award for his goal against Sheffield United on 4 November 2017. Allan McGregor was chosen by Nigel Adkins as Player of the Year and Charlie Andrew took the award for Academy Player of the Year. At a later date Jarrod Bowen also picked up the Hull City Official Supporters Club's Player of the Season award.

== Post-season ==
In April the club announced that the team would be travelling to Kenya to play a match on 13 May 2018 at the Kasarani Stadium. This would be part of a 5-day tour to promote football and Shining Hope for Communities projects in the country. The friendly match against Gor Mahia ended in a 0–0 draw, and was decided on penalties with Hull winning 4–3.
