= Brian Lenihan (footballer) =

Irish footballer

Personal information
- Full name: Brian Patrick Lenihan
- Date of birth: 8 June 1994 (age 32)
- Place of birth: Cork, Ireland
- Height: 1.87 m (6 ft 1 1/2 in)
- Positions: Right back; midfielder

Youth career
- College Corinthians
- Cork City

Senior career*
| Years | Team | Apps | (Gls) |
| 2012–2014 | Cork City | 27 | (0) |
| 2014–2018 | Hull City | 1 | (0) |
| 2014 | → Blackpool (loan) | 2 | (0) |
| Total | | 30 | (0) |

International career
- Republic of Ireland U19
| 2014–2016 | Republic of Ireland U21 | 7 | (0) |
- * Club domestic league appearances and goals

Brian Patrick Lenihan (born 8 June 1994) is an Irish former professional footballer who played as a right back and midfielder.

== Club career ==
Born in Cork, Lenihan began his career with College Corinthians. He moved to Cork City in July 2012, making a total of 27 League of Ireland appearances for them.

After receiving interest from a number of English clubs, Lenihan signed for Hull City on 31 August 2014. The transfer fee was believed to be £200,000.

Lenihan signed a one-month loan deal with Blackpool in November 2014. He made his debut on 8 November 2014 in a 3–1 away defeat to Leeds United. He returned to Hull on 25 November after sustaining a knee injury that ended his season.

Lenihan made his debut for Hull on 30 April 2016 in a 1–0 away defeat to Bolton Wanderers.

On 18 April 2018, Lenihan announced his retirement from football at the age of 23, citing repeated injury problems as the main reason for his decision. He had been battling a recurring knee injury in the three years prior to his retirement, which saw him feature just twice for Hull City in the four years he was at the club. The last of those appearances came in a 2–0 EFL Cup loss to Doncaster Rovers where he was captain. Lenihan later revealed that he retired due to mental health issues which forced him to retire from the game after undergoing treatment in Manchester.

== International career ==
Lenihan represented the Republic of Ireland under-19s.

Lenihan made his debut for the Republic of Ireland under-21s in May 2014. He was called up to the senior squad in October 2014. However, later that month he was sent back to the under-21s.

== Career statistics ==
As of 22 August 2017

| Club | Season | League | | Cup | | League Cup | | Other | | Total | |
| Club | Season | Apps | Goals | Apps | Goals | Apps | Goals | Apps | Goals | Apps | Goals |
|---|---|---|---|---|---|---|---|---|---|---|---|
| Cork City | 2012 | 3 | 0 | 0 | 0 | 0 | 0 | 0 | 0 | 3 | 0 |
| Cork City | 2013 | 3 | 0 | 0 | 0 | 1 | 0 | 0 | 0 | 4 | 0 |
| Cork City | 2014 | 21 | 0 | 0 | 0 | 1 | 0 | 0 | 0 | 22 | 0 |
| Cork City | Total | 27 | 0 | 0 | 0 | 2 | 0 | 0 | 0 | 29 | 0 |
| Hull City | 2014–15 | 0 | 0 | 0 | 0 | 0 | 0 | 0 | 0 | 0 | 0 |
| Hull City | 2015–16 | 1 | 0 | 0 | 0 | 0 | 0 | 0 | 0 | 1 | 0 |
| Hull City | 2016–17 | 0 | 0 | 0 | 0 | 0 | 0 | 0 | 0 | 0 | 0 |
| Hull City | 2017–18 | 0 | 0 | 0 | 0 | 1 | 0 | 0 | 0 | 1 | 0 |
| Hull City | Total | 1 | 0 | 0 | 0 | 1 | 0 | 0 | 0 | 2 | 0 |
| Blackpool (loan) | 2014–15 | 2 | 0 | 0 | 0 | 0 | 0 | 0 | 0 | 2 | 0 |
| Career total | | 30 | 0 | 0 | 0 | 3 | 0 | 0 | 0 | 33 | 0 |
