= Greg Olley =

English footballer (born 1996)

Personal information
- Full name: Greg Thomas Olley
- Date of birth: 2 February 1996 (age 30)
- Place of birth: Durham, England
- Height: 5 ft 10 in (1.78 m)
- Position: Attacking midfielder

Team information
- Current team: AFC Fylde
- Number: 14

Youth career
- –2015: Newcastle United

Senior career*
Years	Team	Apps	(Gls)
2015–2018	Hull City	0	(0)
2018–2025	Gateshead	191	(35)
2025–2026	York City	25	(4)
2026–	AFC Fylde	0	(0)

International career
2019	England C	1	(0)
- * Club domestic league appearances and goals as of 19:41, 18 August 2026 (UTC)

Greg Thomas Olley (born 2 February 1996) is an English professional footballer who plays as an attacking midfielder for National League club AFC Fylde.

== Club career ==
=== Early career ===
Olley signed for Hull City in 2015 after being released by Newcastle United at the end of the 2014–15 season. He made his first-team debut for Hull on 23 August 2016, playing the full 90 minutes in a 3–1 EFL Cup victory over Exeter City. He was released by Hull at the end of the 2017–18 season.

=== Gateshead ===
Olley signed for National League club Gateshead on 15 July 2018 on a one-year contract. Olley, like the majority of Gateshead's players and staff, did not have his contract renewed at the end of the season due to financial issues. However, he signed a new one-year contract with the club on 5 July 2019. During the 2019–20 season, Olley recorded 7 goals and 15 assists.

In June 2021, he was named Gateshead's club captain. Olley was awarded the National League North's Player of the Month award for January 2022 as his side sat top of the league. Gateshead won the title, with Olley recording 28 assists in all competitions. He also earned a place in the National League North Team of the Year. Olley captained his side in the 2023 FA Trophy final at Wembley Stadium as his side lost 1–0 to FC Halifax Town. On 3 June 2023, Olley signed a two-year contract extension, keeping him with Gateshead until 2025. He started for Gateshead in the 2024 FA Trophy final at Wembley, as his team won the trophy on penalties against Solihull Moors. In the second match of the 2024–25 season, Olley suffered a broken leg following a tackle from Dion Kelly-Evans in a match against Woking.

Olley departed the club at the end of the 2024–25 season.

=== York City ===
On 15 July 2025, Olley joined National League side York City.

== Career statistics ==
As of match played 17 August 2024

Appearances and goals by club, season and competition
Club	Season	League			FA Cup		League Cup		Other		Total	
Club	Season	Division	Apps	Goals	Apps	Goals	Apps	Goals	Apps	Goals	Apps	Goals
Hull City	2016–17	Premier League	0	0	0	0	1	0	—		1	0
Hull City	2017–18	Championship	0	0	0	0	1	0	—		1	0
Hull City	Total		0	0	0	0	2	0	—		2	0
Gateshead	2018–19	National League	38	7	2	1	—		1 (Note: Appearance(s) in FA Trophy)	0	41	8
Gateshead	2019–20	National League North	33	4	1	0	—		0	0	34	4
Gateshead	2020–21	National League North	14	4	0	0	—		1	0	15	4
Gateshead	2021–22	National League North	39	6	3	1	—		0	0	42	7
Gateshead	2022–23	National League	41	5	3	1	—		5	2	49	8
Gateshead	2023–24	National League	24	6	2	0	—		2	0	28	6
Gateshead	2024–25	National League	2	3	0	0	—		0	0	2	3
Gateshead	Total		191	35	11	3	—		9	2	211	40
Career total			191	35	11	3	2	0	9	2	204	40

== Honours ==
Gateshead

- National League North: 2021–22
- FA Trophy: 2023–24; runner-up: 2022–23

York City

- National League: 2025–26

Individual

- National League North Team of the Year: 2021–22
- National League North Player of the Month: January 2022
