= Josh Clackstone =

English footballer

Personal information
- Full name: Joshua Philip Clackstone
- Date of birth: 18 September 1996 (age 30)
- Place of birth: Beverley, England
- Height: 5 ft 7 in (1.70 m)
- Position: Defender

Team information
- Current team: Alfreton Town

Youth career
- –2016: Hull City

Senior career*
Years	Team	Apps	(Gls)
2016–2018	Hull City	0	(0)
2017	→ Notts County (loan)	8	(0)
2017	→ FC Halifax Town (loan)	5	(0)
2018–	Alfreton Town	181	(3)
- * Club domestic league appearances and goals as of 21:01, 24 April 2024 (UTC)

Joshua Philip Clackstone (born 18 September 1996) is an English professional footballer who plays as a defender for Alfreton Town.

== Career ==
Born in Beverley, Clackstone began his career at Hull City, and signed on loan for Notts County in January 2017. He moved on loan to FC Halifax Town in November 2017.

He was released by Hull at the end of the 2017–18 season, having made one appearance for the club.

In July 2018, Clackstone signed for Alfreton Town.

== Career statistics ==
As of 6 December 2018

Appearances and goals by club, season and competition
Club	Season	League			FA Cup		League Cup		Other		Total	
Club	Season	Division	Apps	Goals	Apps	Goals	Apps	Goals	Apps	Goals	Apps	Goals
Hull City	2016–17	Premier League	0	0	0	0	0	0	0	0	0	0
Hull City	2017–18	Championship	0	0	0	0	1	0	0	0	1	0
Hull City	Total		0	0	0	0	1	0	0	0	1	0
Notts County (loan)	2016–17	League Two	8	0	0	0	0	0	0	0	8	0
FC Halifax Town (loan)	2017–18	National League	5	0	0	0	0	0	0	0	5	0
Alfreton Town	2018–19	National League North	11	0	2	0	0	0	0	0	13	0
Career total			24	0	2	0	1	0	0	0	27	0
