= Ondřej Mazuch =

Czech footballer

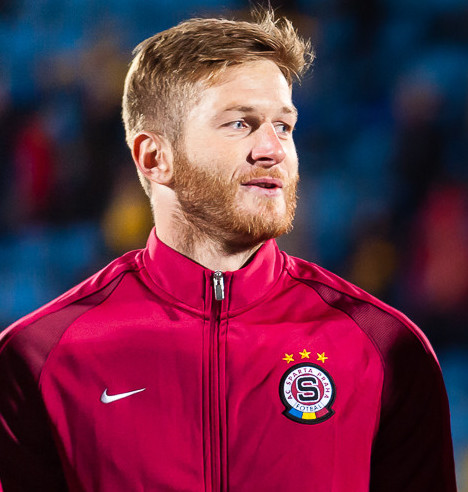
- Mazuch with Sparta in 2017

Personal information
- Full name: Ondřej Mazuch
- Date of birth: 15 March 1989 (age 37)
- Place of birth: Hodonín, Czechoslovakia
- Height: 1.89 m (6 ft 2 in)
- Position: Centre back

Youth career
- 1995–1996: Pares Prušánky
- 1996–2000: Sigma Hodonín
- 2001–2006: Brno

Senior career*
Years	Team	Apps	(Gls)
2006–2007	Brno	24	(1)
2007–2009	Fiorentina	0	(0)
2009–2011	Anderlecht	65	(5)
2012–2015	Dnipro Dnipropetrovsk	65	(0)
2016–2017	Sparta Prague	18	(1)
2017–2019	Hull City	20	(0)
2020	Mladá Boleslav	12	(0)
2021–2022	Teplice	16	(0)

International career^{‡}
2004–2005	Czech Republic U16	9	(0)
2005–2006	Czech Republic U17	18	(0)
2006	Czech Republic U19	9	(0)
2007–2009	Czech Republic U20	14	(0)
2007–2011	Czech Republic U21	21	(1)
2010–2014	Czech Republic	3	(0)
Medal record
Men's football
Representing Czech Republic
UEFA European Under-17 Championship
Runner-up	2006 Luxembourg
- * Club domestic league appearances and goals as of 18:24, 12 August 2021 (UTC) ‡ National team caps and goals as of 11 September 2021

Ondřej Mazuch (Czech pronunciation: [ˈondr̝ɛj ˈmazux]; born 15 March 1989) is a Czech former professional footballer who last played as a centre back for Czech First League club FK Teplice.

== Career ==
Mazuch started his career at 1. FC Brno before moving to Serie A club ACF Fiorentina on 2 June 2007 for €2.8 million. After two years spent mostly with the under-19 team, on 25 June 2009 Mazuch was loaned to Belgian club R.S.C. Anderlecht. On 29 April 2010 R.S.C. Anderlecht signed the 21-year-old defender on a permanent deal, who was recently on loan from ACF Fiorentina. The player has signed a four-year deal.

In January 2012, Mazuch moved to Ukrainian Premier League side FC Dnipro Dnipropetrovsk for €3 million.

In December 2015, Mazuch signed 4.5-year contract with AC Sparta Prague.

On 26 July 2017, Mazuch signed a two-year contract with Hull City after impressing in pre-season trials with the club. He made his debut on the opening day of the season, 5 August 2017, away at Aston Villa, in a 1–1 draw.

He was released by Hull City at the end of the 2018–19 season.

== Career statistics ==
As of 26 January 2019.

Club	Season	League			Cup		Continental		Total	
Club	Season	Division	Apps	Goals	Apps	Goals	Apps	Goals	Apps	Goals
Fiorentina	2007–08	Serie A	0	0	2	0	0	0	2	0
Fiorentina	2008–09	Serie A	0	0	0	0	0	0	0	0
Fiorentina	Total		0	0	2	0	0	0	2	0
Anderlecht (Loan)	2009–10	Belgian Pro League	30	4	3	0	10	0	43	4
Anderlecht	2010–11	Belgian Pro League	35	1	1	0	10	0	46	1
Anderlecht	2011–12	Belgian Pro League	0	0	0	0	—		0	0
Anderlecht	Total		65	5	4	0	20	0	89	5
Dnipro Dnipropetrovsk	2011–12	Ukraine Premier League	10	0	0	0	—		10	0
Dnipro Dnipropetrovsk	2012–13	Ukraine Premier League	19	0	2	0	9	0	30	0
Dnipro Dnipropetrovsk	2013–14	Ukraine Premier League	26	0	0	0	7	0	33	0
Dnipro Dnipropetrovsk	2014–15	Ukraine Premier League	10	0	1	0	9	0	20	0
Dnipro Dnipropetrovsk	Total		65	0	3	0	25	0	93	0
Sparta Prague	2015–16	Czech First League	4	0	2	0	0	0	6	0
Sparta Prague	2016–17	Czech First League	14	1	1	0	8	0	23	1
Sparta Prague	Total		18	1	3	0	8	0	29	1
Hull City	2017–18	Championship	14	0	1	0	—		15	0
Hull City	2018–19	Championship	6	0	1	0	—		7	0
Hull City	Total		20	0	2	0	0	0	22	0
Career total			168	6	14	0	53	0	235	6

== Honours ==
Dnipro Dnipropetrovsk

- UEFA Europa League runner-up: 2014–15

=== International ===
Czech Republic U-17

- European Under-17 Championship runner-up: 2006

Czech Republic U20

- FIFA U-20 World Cup runner-up: 2007
- UEFA European Under-21 Championship bronze:2011
