= Ben Hinchliffe (footballer, born 1997) =

English footballer

Personal information
- Full name: Benjamin Jack Hinchliffe
- Date of birth: 25 September 1997 (age 29)
- Place of birth: Kingston upon Hull, England
- Height: 1.78 m (5 ft 10 in)
- Position: Forward

Team information
- Current team: Beverley Town F.C.

Youth career
- 2012–2016: Hull City

Senior career*
Years	Team	Apps	(Gls)
2016–2019	Hull City	0	(0)
2018	→ Gainsborough Trinity (loan)	0	(0)
2019–2023	Barton Town	126	(63)
2023–	Beverley Town	27	(18)
- * Club domestic league appearances and goals as of 22:20, 16 March 2018 (UTC)

Benjamin Jack Hinchliffe (born 25 September 1997) is an English semi-professional footballer who plays for Northern Counties East League Division One side Beverley Town as a forward. He began his career with Championship side Hull City.

== Club career ==
=== Hull City ===
Hinchliffe joined Hull City at the age of 14 and signed a professional deal in May 2017. On 22 August 2017, he made his debut in a 2–0 EFL Cup defeat to Doncaster Rovers.

=== Gainsborough Trinity ===
Hinchliffe joined Gainsborough Trinity on 16 March 2018 on loan until the end of April 2018.

=== Barton Town ===
Following his release from Hull, Hinchliffe joined Barton Town. In the 2019–20 season, he was the club's top scorer with 19 goals in 32 appearances.

=== Beverley Town ===
In the summer of 2023, Hinchliffe joined Northern Counties East League Division One side Beverley Town.

== Statistics ==
As of 22 August 2017.

Season	Club	Division	League		FA Cup		League Cup		Other		Total	
Season	Club	Division	Apps	Goals	Apps	Goals	Apps	Goals	Apps	Goals	Apps	Goals
2017–18	Hull City	Championship	0	0	0	0	1	0	0	0	1	0
Career total			0	0	0	0	1	0	0	0	1	0
