= Jonathan Edwards (English footballer) =

English footballer (born 1996)

Personal information
- Full name: Jonathan Devonte Edwards
- Date of birth: 24 November 1996 (age 29)
- Place of birth: Luton, England
- Height: 1.80 m (5 ft 11 in)
- Position: Striker

Team information
- Current team: Kettering Town

Youth career
- 2011–2013: Stevenage
- 2013–2014: Peterborough United

Senior career*
Years	Team	Apps	(Gls)
2014–2016	Peterborough United	3	(0)
2014	→ Bishop's Stortford (loan)	1	(0)
2014–2015	→ Biggleswade Town (loan)	3	(1)
2015	→ Ilkeston (loan)	9	(2)
2015–2016	→ St Albans City (loan)	8	(1)
2016	→ St Albans City (loan)	3	(1)
2016	Dunstable Town	8	(1)
2016–2018	Hull City	0	(0)
2017–2018	→ Accrington Stanley (loan)	12	(1)
2018	→ Woking (loan)	14	(2)
2018–2019	FC Halifax Town	33	(3)
2019–2020	Maidstone United	16	(1)
2020	Biggleswade Town	7	(4)
2020–2021	Royston Town	7	(3)
2021–2022	FC Romania	26	(12)
2022–2024	St Ives Town	81	(56)
2024–	Kettering Town	0	(0)
- * Club domestic league appearances and goals as of 08:04, 15 October 2024 (UTC)

Jonathan Devonte Edwards (born 24 November 1996) is an English professional footballer who plays as a striker for Kettering Town.

== Club career ==
Born in Luton, Edwards joined Peterborough United from Stevenage and signed his first professional contract with the club on 10 March 2015 after a prolific two seasons in the under 18 side. Edwards made his debut in a 1–1 draw against Barnsley on 18 April 2015, replacing goalscorer Conor Washington in the 94th minute of the match. His home debut followed a week later as a second-half substitute in a 4–3 win against Crawley Town. Edwards made his first start for the club on the final day of the season, but was sent off in the second half of a 1–1 draw against Oldham Athletic.

In July 2015, Edwards joined Ilkeston for an original season-long loan but he returned to Peterborough in September. On 27 November 2015, Edwards signed for St Albans City on loan until 2 January 2016. He scored two goals on his debut in the Herts Senior Cup. He subsequently remained with St Albans until 5 March 2016.

On 12 May 2016, following a spell with non-league side Dunstable Town, Hull City announced the signing of Edwards on a one-year contract after a successful trial with the club's U21 squad. On 1 January 2017, Edwards joined EFL League Two club Accrington Stanley on loan until the end of the 2016–17 season. His first appearance was as a substitute against Hartlepool in the 2–2 draw at home. His first start for Accrington Stanley was part of a 3–0 defeat to Cheltenham Town. Edwards was subbed off at the 61st minute.

On 3 July 2017, Edwards signed a new one-year contract with Hull City with an option for a further year. Though he returned to Accrington Stanley on loan for the 2017–18 season.

On 5 January 2018, Edwards joined National League side Woking on loan for the remainder of the campaign. A day later, he made his Woking debut during their 4–4 home draw against Maidstone United, replacing Jason Banton in the 70th minute. Over a month later, Edwards scored his first goal for the club, heading home Woking's second in their 3–2 away defeat to Hartlepool United.

On 13 June 2018, it was announced that Edwards would leave Hull following the conclusion of his contract at the end of the month.

In August 2018, Edwards signed for FC Halifax Town.

On 18 June 2019, Maidstone United confirmed the signing of Edwards.

After a spell back with Biggleswade Town, following his departure from Maidstone in January 2020, Edwards joined Royston Town ahead of the 2020–21 campaign and went onto score four on his debut during their 6–0 victory over Newmarket Town in the FA Cup. On 11 August 2021, FC Romania confirmed the signing of Edwards. In July 2022, Edwards joined St Ives Town.

In October 2024, Edwards joined Kettering Town.

== Career statistics ==
As of 14 October 2024

Club	Season	League			FA Cup		League Cup		Other		Total	
Club	Season	Division	Apps	Goals	Apps	Goals	Apps	Goals	Apps	Goals	Apps	Goals
Peterborough United	2013–14	League One	0	0	0	0	0	0	0	0	0	0
Peterborough United	2014–15	League One	3	0	0	0	0	0	0	0	3	0
Peterborough United	2015–16	League One	0	0	0	0	0	0	0	0	0	0
Peterborough United	Total		3	0	0	0	0	0	0	0	3	0
Bishop's Stortford (loan)	2013–14	Conference South	1	0	0	0	—		0	0	1	0
Biggleswade Town (loan)	2014–15	Southern League Premier Division	3	1	0	0	—		0	0	3	1
Ilkeston (loan)	2015–16	Northern Premier League Premier Division	9	2	1	0	—		0	0	10	2
St Albans City (loan)	2015–16	National League South	11	2	—		—		0	0	11	2
Dunstable Town	2015–16	Southern League Premier Division	8	1	—		—		0	0	8	1
Hull City	2016–17	Premier League	0	0	0	0	0	0	—		0	0
Hull City	2017–18	Championship	0	0	0	0	0	0	—		0	0
Hull City	Total		0	0	0	0	0	0	—		0	0
Accrington Stanley (loan)	2016–17	League Two	10	1	1	0	0	0	0	0	11	1
Accrington Stanley (loan)	2017–18	League Two	2	0	0	0	2	0	3 (Note: Appearance(s) in EFL Trophy)	1	7	1
Accrington Stanley (loan)	Total		12	1	1	0	2	0	3	1	18	2
Woking (loan)	2017–18	National League	14	2	—		—		—		14	2
FC Halifax Town	2018–19	National League	33	3	5	0	—		3 (Note: Appearance(s) in FA Trophy)	1	41	4
Maidstone United	2019–20	National League South	16	1	3	1	—		1	0	20	2
Biggleswade Town	2019–20	Southern League Premier Division Central	7	4	—		—		—		7	4
Royston Town	2020–21	Southern League Premier Division Central	7	3	4	5	—		1	0	12	8
FC Romania	2021–22	Southern League Division One Central	26	12	2	2	—		0	0	28	14
St Ives Town	2022–23	Southern League Premier Division Central	40	23	4	2	—		0	0	44	25
St Ives Town	2023–24	Southern League Premier Division Central	33	30	0	0	—		3	2	36	32
St Ives Town	2024–25	Southern League Premier Division Central	8	3	4	2	—		1	0	13	5
St Ives Town	Total		81	56	8	4	0	0	4	2	93	62
Career total			231	88	24	12	2	0	12	4	269	104
