= Will Mannion =

English footballer (born 1998)

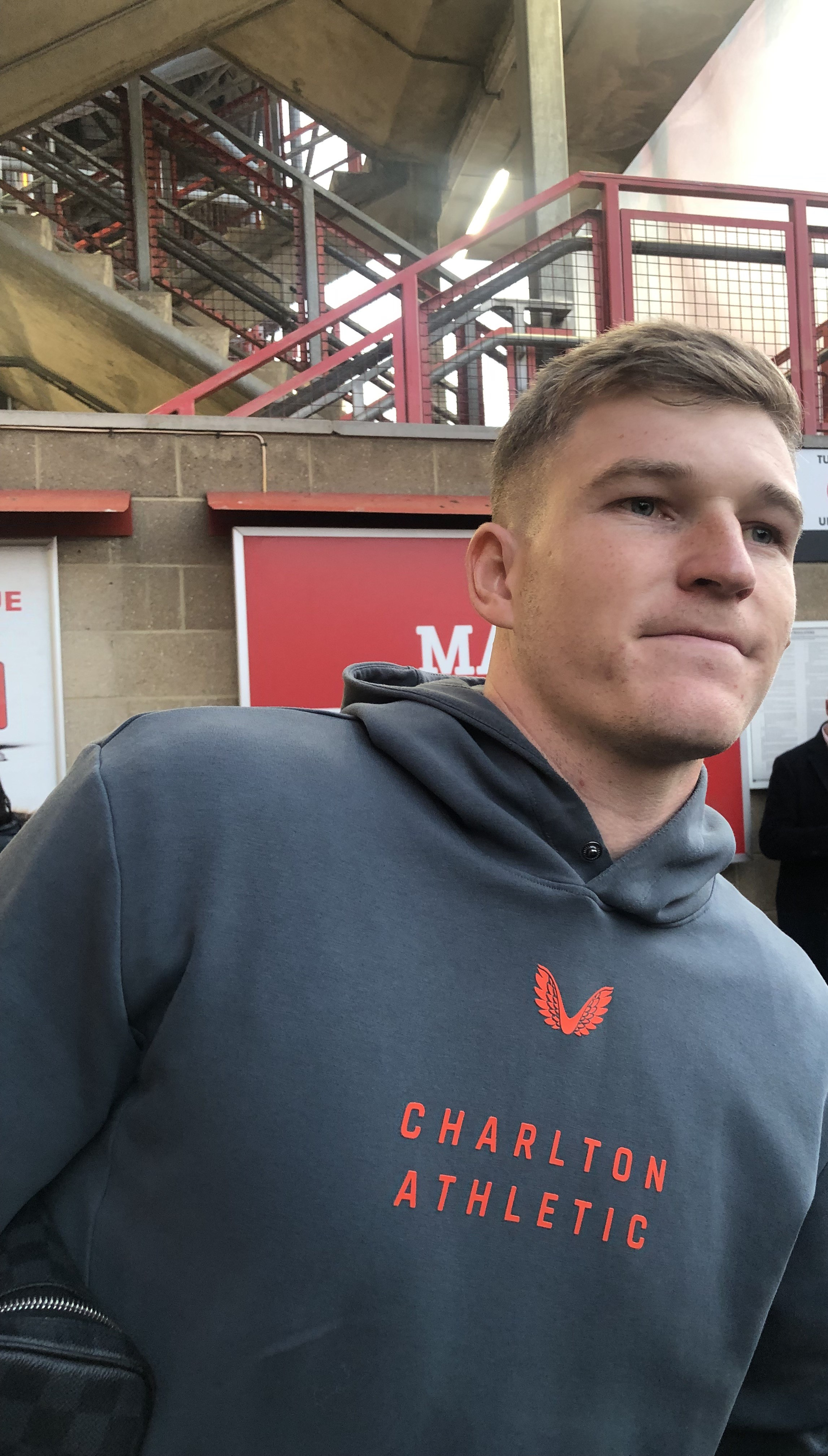
- Mannion in 2024

Personal information
- Full name: William John Mannion
- Date of birth: 5 May 1998 (age 28)
- Place of birth: Hillingdon, England
- Height: 6 ft 4 in (1.93 m)
- Position: Goalkeeper

Team information
- Current team: Charlton Athletic
- Number: 25

Youth career
- 2014–2016: AFC Wimbledon

Senior career*
Years	Team	Apps	(Gls)
2016–2020	Hull City	0	(0)
2017	→ Plymouth Argyle (loan)	0	(0)
2018–2019	→ Aldershot Town (loan)	22	(0)
2019–2020	→ Kidderminster Harriers (loan)	17	(0)
2020–2021	Pafos	0	(0)
2021–2024	Cambridge United	29	(0)
2021–2022	→ Havant & Waterlooville (loan)	11	(0)
2024–	Charlton Athletic	41	(0)

International career^{‡}
2016	England U19	2	(0)
- * Club domestic league appearances and goals as of 17:10, 21 November 2026 (UTC) ‡ National team caps and goals as of 14:10, 7 August 2025 (UTC)

William John Mannion (born 5 May 1998) is an English professional footballer who plays as a goalkeeper for EFL Championship club Charlton Athletic.

== Club career ==
=== Youth career ===
Mannion joined AFC Wimbledon at the age of 16. He was a key member of the Under-18 team that knocked Premier League academies Watford and Newcastle United out of the FA Youth Cup before a fifth round defeat to Chelsea.

=== Hull City ===
In July 2016, Mannion signed for Premier League club Hull City on a three-year deal. Due to his age, AFC Wimbledon were entitled to a compensation fee settled by a tribunal. In May 2017, it was announced that Hull City would pay an initial fee of £100,000, plus further payments of up to £100,000 for appearances for the first team, and up to £225,000 should he become an Under-21 and full international in a competitive match.

Mannion spent his first season with the club's Under-23 side, and was named on the bench in the EFL Cup in August 2016. On 22 August 2017, he made his debut in a 2–0 EFL Cup defeat at Doncaster Rovers.

On 1 March 2019, Mannion had his contract with Hull City extended by one-year.

Following the relegation of Hull City at the end of the 2019–20 season to the EFL League One, Mannion was released by the club.

==== Plymouth Argyle (loan) ====
Mannion joined Plymouth Argyle on an emergency loan, on the same date of an EFL Trophy game away to Yeovil Town. This game quickly became his debut, the game ended in defeat for Argyle as they went crashing out of the cup 2–1 due to a late goal by Sam Surridge. This turned out to be Mannion's only game for Argyle.

==== Aldershot Town (loan) ====
On 9 August 2018, Mannion agreed to join National League side Aldershot Town on loan until January 2019. This was later extended to the end of the 2018–19 season.

==== Kidderminster Harriers (loan) ====
He joined National League North side Kidderminster Harriers on loan on 29 October 2019 until 25 April 2020 and played in 17 games for them.

=== Pafos ===
On 13 August 2020, Mannion joined Cypriot First Division side Pafos on a free transfer.

=== Cambridge United ===
On 3 August 2021, Mannion signed a one-year deal with Cambridge United.

==== Havant & Waterlooville (loan) ====
On 22 October 2021, Mannion joined National League South side Havant & Waterlooville on a one-month loan deal.

=== Charlton Athletic ===
On 10 June 2024, it was announced that Mannion would join Charlton Athletic on a three-year contract with the option of a further year that would start when his deal at Cambridge United expired at the end of June 2024.

== International career ==
In January 2016, Mannion was invited to train with the England Under-16 squad. He was called up to the England Under-19 squad later that year, and made his international debut in a 1–1 draw with Netherlands Under-19s on 1 September. He made his second appearance a month later in a 2–1 win over Hungary Under-19s.

== Career statistics ==
As of match played 21 November 2026

Appearances and goals by club, season and competition
Club	Season	League			National Cup		EFL Cup		Other		Total	
Club	Season	Division	Apps	Goals	Apps	Goals	Apps	Goals	Apps	Goals	Apps	Goals
Hull City	2017–18	Championship	0	0	0	0	1	0	—		1	0
Hull City	2018–19	Championship	0	0	0	0	0	0	—		0	0
Hull City	2019–20	Championship	0	0	0	0	0	0	—		0	0
Hull City	Hull City total		0	0	0	0	1	0	—		1	0
Plymouth Argyle (loan)	2017–18	League One	0	0	0	0	—		1 (Note: Appearance in EFL Trophy)	0	1	0
Aldershot Town (loan)	2018–19	National League	22	0	3	0	—		1 (Note: Appearance in FA Trophy)	0	26	0
Kidderminster Harriers (loan)	2019–20	National League North	17	0	0	0	—		0	0	17	0
Pafos	2020–21	Cypriot First Division	0	0	1	0	—		—		1	0
Cambridge United	2021–22	League One	2	0	0	0	0	0	0	0	2	0
Cambridge United	2022–23	League One	13	0	3	0	2	0	3	0	21	0
Cambridge United	2023–24	League One	14	0	0	0	1	0	3	0	18	0
Cambridge United	Cambridge United total		29	0	3	0	3	0	6	0	41	0
Havant & Waterlooville (loan)	2021–22	National League South	11	0	1	0	—		1	0	13	0
Charlton Athletic	2024–25	League One	28	0	2	0	1	0	3 (Note: Appearance in the League One play-offs.)	0	34	0
Charlton Athletic	2025–26	Championship	9	0	1	0	1	0	—		11	0
Charlton Athletic	2026–27	Championship	4	0	0	0	1	0	—		5	0
Charlton Athletic	Charlton Athletic total		41	0	3	0	3	0	3	0	50	0
Career total			120	0	11	0	7	0	12	0	150	0

== Honours ==
Charlton Athletic

- EFL League One play-offs: 2025
