= Ellis Barkworth =

English footballer

Personal information
- Full name: Ellis Lee Barkworth
- Date of birth: 15 October 1997 (age 29)
- Place of birth: Kingston upon Hull, England
- Height: 1.74 m (5 ft 9 in)
- Position: Midfielder

Team information
- Current team: Scarborough Athletic

Youth career
- 2008–2016: Hull City

Senior career*
Years	Team	Apps	(Gls)
2016–2018	Hull City	0	(0)
2018–2019	Tadcaster Albion	50	(1)
2019–	Scarborough Athletic	0	(0)
- * Club domestic league appearances and goals as of 20:38, 2 July 2019 (UTC)

Ellis Lee Barkworth (born 15 October 1997) is an English professional footballer who plays for Scarborough Athletic as a midfielder.

== Career ==
Barkworth joined Hull City at the age of nine and signed a professional deal in May 2016. On 22 August 2017, he made his debut in a 2–0 EFL Cup defeat to Doncaster Rovers.
