= 2012–13 Hull City A.F.C. season =

English football club season

Hull City
2012–13 season
- Chairman: Assem Allam
- Manager: Steve Bruce
- Stadium: KC Stadium
- Championship: 2nd (promoted)
- FA Cup: Fourth round
- League Cup: Second round
- Top goalscorer: League: Robert Koren (9); All: Robert Koren (9)
- Highest home attendance: 23,812 (4 May vs Cardiff City)
- Lowest home attendance: 14,756 (15 September vs Millwall)
- Average home league attendance: 17,368
Home colours	Away colours	Third colours

The 2012–13 season is Hull City's third consecutive season back in the Championship after relegation from the Premier League in the 2009–10 season. They also competed in the League Cup and the FA Cup.

After a dramatic last day of the season the club took second place and gained automatic promotion back to the Premier League for the 2013–14 season.

== Events ==
The closed season saw the arrival of new manager Steve Bruce, on 8 June 2012, on a three-year deal, replacing Nick Barmby, 6 weeks after he was officially sacked. On 29 June 2012 the club announced the new backroom staff for the up-and-coming season; Steve Agnew became the assistant manager, Keith Bertschin as first team coach and Stephen Clemence as reserve team manager. The announcement preceded the start of the new season which started on 2 July 2012 when the players reported back for pre-season training.

On 6 July 2012 Andy Dawson signed a new 1-year deal with the club. On 9 July 2012, goalkeeper Eldin Jakupović signed a two-year contract, becoming Steve Bruce's first full signing as manager.

On 19 July 2012 Nick Proschwitz signed a 3-year £2.6 million (€3.3 million) deal with the club. The following day Senegalese defender Abdoulaye Faye signed a one-year contract.

On 25 July 2012 Sone Aluko signed a 2-year deal with the club.

On 30 July 2012 Steve Bruce brought in his son Alex Bruce on a 2-year deal as he was a free agent after leaving Leeds United.

On 31 July 2012 Hull confirmed that they had signed goalkeeper Ben Amos on a season-long loan from Manchester United. The loan was cut short on 4 January 2013 when he was recalled by Manchester United.

On 8 August 2012 Mark Cullen went on a season long loan to Bury.

Robert Koren signed a new 2-year deal with the club on 11 August 2012.

On 29 August 2012 Danny East went out on a month-long loan to Northampton Town. The loan was later extended to 5 January 2013.

On 30 August 2012 Ahmed Elmohamady arrived on a season-long loan from Sunderland. The loan was cut short on 16 January 2013 when he was recalled by parent club Sunderland. But he returned to Hull on loan for the rest on the season on 31 January 2013.

On 31 August 2012 Cameron Stewart moved to Burnley on loan until January 2013.

On transfer deadline day, 31 August 2012, Stephen Quinn of Sheffield United signed a three-year deal with the club for an undisclosed fee.

In September 2012, former club manager Stan Ternent was appointed as Chief Recruitment Officer for Hull.

On 18 October 2012 Mark Cullen was recalled from a season long loan to Bury.

On 1 November 2012 Liam Cooper went on a month-long loan to Chesterfield and Jamie Devitt went on a month-long loan to Rotherham United. Though after just two matches Devitt returned to the club for treatment following an injury. Cooper's loan was later extended to 5 January 2013.

On 26 October 2012 Mark Oxley went out on loan to Burton Albion to cover for an injury to Stuart Tomlinson.

On 5 November 2012 Robbie Brady returned to the KC Stadium on loan from Manchester United as an emergency loan, this was extended to 2 January 2012 on 5 December 2012.

On 8 November 2012 David Meyler was brought in on loan from Sunderland until 1 January 2013.

On 20 November 2012 Conor Townsend went for a month-long loan spell at Chesterfield, his loan spell was renewed on 25 January 2013 and extended to the end of the season.

On 22 November 2012 goalkeeper David Stockdale was brought in on loan from Fulham until 2 January 2013. This was cut short on 19 December 2012 when he was recalled by Fulham. Stockdale returned to Hull on 18 January 2013 for the remainder of the season.

Sone Aluko was named as the November Player of the Month by the Football League.

On 18 December 2012 it was announced that Nick Thompson had been appointed as managing director of the club.

Steve Bruce was named as the December Manager of the Month by the Football League.

On 4 January 2013 Jamie Devitt went out on loan to Grimsby Town until the end of the 2012–13 season and Aaron McLean moved on loan to Ipswich Town until the end of the 2012–13 season.

On 5 January 2013 Liam Cooper signed a permanent deal with Chesterfield for an undisclosed fee.

On 8 January 2013 the club signed Robbie Brady from Manchester United and David Meyler from Sunderland on three-and-a-half-year deals for undisclosed fees.

On 25 January 2013 Paul McKenna was loaned to Fleetwood Town for the remainder of the season.

On 31 January 2013 Mark Cullen went out on a month-long loan spell to Stockport County. This was later extended to the end of the season.

On 31 January 2013 Ahmed Fathy and Gedo joined on loan for the remainder of the season from Egyptian club Al-Ahly at a cost of £500,000 each.

On 21 February 2013 George Boyd joined on loan from Peterborough United for the remainder of the season.

On 1 March 2013 Cameron Stewart joined Blackburn Rovers on loan until the end of the 2012–13 season.

On 7 March 2013 Danny East joined Gillingham on loan until the end of the 2012–13 season.

On 8 March 2013 Dougie Wilson joined Grimsby Town on loan until the end of the 2012–13 season.

On 27 March 2013 Seyi Olofinjana joined Sheffield Wednesday on loan until the end of the 2012–13 season.

On 28 March 2013 striker Calaum Jahraldo-Martin was signed on an 18-month contract.

George Boyd was named as the March Player of the Month by the Football League.

On 16 May 2013 Abdoulaye Faye signed a new one-year deal to stay with the club for the 2013–14 season, while 12 other players would be released at the end of their contracts.

George Boyd signed a 2-year deal on 28 May 2013 to become a permanent member of the club from the start of the 2013–14 season when his contract with Peterborough United expired.

Following release by the club Andy Dawson signed a one-year player/coach deal with Scunthorpe United on 30 May 2013.

Mark Oxley signed a new two-year contract with the Tigers on 11 June 2013 following the club's promotion to the Premier League.

On 17 June 2013 the signing of defender Maynor Figueroa on a 2-year contract on a free transfer was announced.

On 25 June 2013 Birmingham City defender Curtis Davies signed a 3-year deal with the club for an undisclosed fee.

On 26 June 2013 James Chester signed a new three-year contract with Hull City.

On 27 June 2013 Liam Rosenior signed a new two-year contract with the club.

After being on loan from Sunderland for the season on 28 June 2013 Ahmed Elmohamady signed a three-year contract for an undisclosed fee to become a permanent member of the City squad.

== Players ==
As of 28 June 2013.

=== Current squad ===
Note: Flags indicate national team as defined under FIFA eligibility rules; some limited exceptions apply. Players may hold more than one non-FIFA nationality.

No.	Pos.	Nation	Player
1	GK	SUI	Eldin Jakupović
2	DF	ENG	Liam Rosenior
3	DF	ENG	Andy Dawson (vice-captain)
5	DF	ENG	James Chester
6	DF	ENG	Jack Hobbs (captain)
8	MF	NIR	Corry Evans
10	MF	SLO	Robert Koren (vice-captain)
11	FW	ENG	Jay Simpson
12	FW	ENG	Matty Fryatt
13	GK	ENG	Mark Oxley
14	MF	SCO	Tom Cairney
15	DF	IRL	Paul McShane
17	MF	EGY	Ahmed Fathy (on loan from Al-Ahly)
19	DF	NIR	Joe Dudgeon
22	FW	EGY	Gedo (on loan from Al-Ahly)

No.	Pos.	Nation	Player
23	DF	SEN	Abdoulaye Faye
24	MF	NGR	Sone Aluko
27	MF	EGY	Ahmed Elmohamady
28	DF	NIR	Alex Bruce
29	MF	IRL	Stephen Quinn
30	FW	IRL	Robbie Brady
31	MF	IRL	David Meyler
33	FW	GER	Nick Proschwitz
34	GK	ENG	David Stockdale (on loan from Fulham)
35	GK	ENG	Joe Cracknell
37	FW	SCO	George Boyd (on loan from Peterborough United)
—	DF	ENG	Curtis Davies
—	MF	ENG	Danny Emerton
—	DF	HON	Maynor Figueroa

=== Out on loan ===
Note: Flags indicate national team as defined under FIFA eligibility rules; some limited exceptions apply. Players may hold more than one non-FIFA nationality.

No.	Pos.	Nation	Player
4	MF	ENG	Paul McKenna (at Fleetwood Town until the end of the 2012–13 season)
7	MF	ENG	Cameron Stewart (at Blackburn Rovers until the end of the 2012–13 season)
9	FW	ENG	Aaron McLean (at Ipswich Town until the end of the 2012–13 season)
16	MF	NGR	Seyi Olofinjana (at Sheffield Wednesday until the end of the 2012–13 season)
20	MF	IRL	Jamie Devitt (at Grimsby Town until the end of the 2012–13 season)
21	FW	ENG	Mark Cullen (at Stockport County until the end of the 2012–13 season)
25	DF	ENG	Danny East (at Gillingham until the end of the 2012–13 season)
26	DF	ENG	Sonny Bradley (on loan at Aldershot Town until end of 2012–13 season)
32	DF	ENG	Conor Townsend (at Chesterfield until the end of the 2012–13 season)
36	MF	NIR	Dougie Wilson (at Grimsby Town until the end of the 2012–13 season)

== Results ==
=== Pre-season ===
The pre-season matches were announced on 20 June 2012. An additional home fixture against Norwich City was announced on 6 June 2012. A pre-season training camp took place in Portugal from 8 July 2012.

16 July 2012 Billy Bly; Memorial; Trophy	North Ferriby United	1–3	Hull City	North Ferriby
19:30 BST	Muldoon 48'	Report	Mclean 58'; Fryatt 71' (pen.); Simpson 81'	Stadium: Rapid Solicitors Stadium

17 July 2012	Winterton Rangers	0–5	Hull City	Winterton
19:30 BST		Report	Simpson 17', 24', 38'; Devitt 57'; Fryatt 78'	Stadium: West Street; Attendance: 600

20 July 2012	Grimsby Town	0–0	Hull City	Grimsby
19:30 BST		Report		Stadium: Blundell Park; Attendance: 2,280

28 July 2012	Rochdale	0–1	Hull City	Rochdale
15:00 BST		Report	Koren 23'	Stadium: Spotland Stadium

31 July 2012	Doncaster Rovers	3–1	Hull City	Doncaster
19:30 BST	M. Woods 55', 81' (pen.); Morgan-Smith 75'	Report	Jones 8' (o.g.)	Stadium: Keepmoat Stadium

4 August 2012	Hartlepool United	1–1	Hull City	Hartlepool
15:00 BST	Franks 60'	Report	Stewart 72'	Stadium: Victoria Park

7 August 2012	Hull City	0–0	Norwich City	Kingston upon Hull
19:45 BST		Report		Stadium: KC Stadium; Referee: M. Brown

=== Championship ===
18 August 2012 1	Hull City	1–0	Brighton and Hove Albion	Kingston upon Hull
15:00 BST	Faye (yellow card) 56'; Simpson 85'; McKenna (yellow card) 88'	Report	Noone (yellow card) 25'	Stadium: KC Stadium; Attendance: 15,794; Referee: Stuart Attwell

22 August 2012 2	Blackburn Rovers	1–0	Hull City	Blackburn
19:45 BST	Kazim-Richards 77'; Kazim-Richards (yellow card) 78'	Report		Stadium: Ewood Park; Attendance: 13,562; Referee: T. Bates

25 August 2012 3	Charlton Athletic	0–0	Hull City	Charlton, London
15:00 BST		Report		Stadium: The Valley; Attendance: 16,202; Referee: S. Hooper

1 September 2012 4	Hull City	3–1	Bolton Wanderers	Kingston upon Hull
15:00 BST	Aluko 29'; Faye 46'; Quinn 49'; Evans (yellow card) 73'	Report	Eagles 17'; Davies (yellow card) 87'	Stadium: KC Stadium; Attendance: 15,304; Referee: C. Sarginson

15 September 2012 5	Hull City	4–1	Millwall	Kingston upon Hull
15:00 BST	Koren 14'; A. Bruce (yellow card) 21'; Simpson 32'; Faye 36'; Aluko 40'	Report	Robinson (yellow card) 41'; Dunne (yellow card) 46'; Henderson 63'	Stadium: KC Stadium; Attendance: 14,756; Referee: J. Adcock

18 September 2012 6	Leeds United	2–3	Hull City	Leeds
19:45 BST	Becchio 8' (pen.); Pearce (yellow card) 38'; Tonge (yellow card) 45'; Austin (yellow card) 67'; Gray 90+2'	Report	Elmohamady 23'; Faye 29'; Koren 76'; Evans (yellow card) 85'; Amos (yellow card) 90+4'	Stadium: Elland Road; Attendance: 19,750; Referee: R. East

23 September 2012 7	Leicester City	3–1	Hull City	Leicester
15:00 BST	Nugent 7', 42', 90+1'	Report	Simpson 26'	Stadium: King Power Stadium; Attendance: 20,815; Referee: E. Ilderton

29 September 2012 8	Hull City	1–3	Peterborough United	Kingston upon Hull
15:00 BST	Simpson 61'	Report	Sinclair 24', 29', 73'; Boyd (yellow card) 40'; Sinclair (yellow card) 69'	Stadium: KC Stadium; Attendance: 15,279; Referee: M. Oliver

2 October 2012 9	Hull City	2–3	Blackpool	Kingston upon Hull
19:45 BST	Aluko 39'; Quinn 47'	Report	M Phillips 11'; K Phillips 71'; Dicko 83'	Stadium: KC Stadium; Attendance: 14,919; Referee: S. Mathieson

6 October 2012 10	Sheffield Wednesday	0–1	Hull City	Sheffield
15:00 BST		Report	McKenna (yellow card) 30'; Aluko (yellow card) 60'; McLean 77'; Olofinjana (yellow card) 79'	Stadium: Hillsborough Stadium; Attendance: 23,441; Referee: J. Moss

20 October 2012 11	Hull City	2–1	Ipswich Town	Kingston upon Hull
15:00 BST	Proschwitz 74', 90+3'	Report	Emmanuel-Thomas 29'; Murphy (yellow card) 31'; Wellens (yellow card) 82'; Henderson (yellow card) 90+1'; Drury (yellow card) 90+5'	Stadium: KC Stadium; Attendance: 15,983; Referee: D. Coote

23 October 2012 12	Middlesbrough	2–0	Hull City	Middlesbrough
19:45 BST	Haroun 59'; Miller 66'; Ledesma (yellow card) 90+2'	Report		Stadium: Riverside Stadium; Attendance: 14,129; Referee: P. Tierney

27 October 2012 13	Bristol City	1–2	Hull City	Bristol
17:20 BST	Davies 25'; Pearson (yellow card) 89'	Report	Aluko 8'; Skuse 65' (o.g.); Elmohamady (yellow card) 90+1'	Stadium: Ashton Gate Stadium; Attendance: 12,354; Referee: F. Graham

3 November 2012 14	Hull City	1–0	Barnsley	Kingston upon Hull
15:00 GMT	Aluko 16'; Simpson (yellow card) 37'	Report	Golbourne (yellow card) 59'	Stadium: KC Stadium; Attendance: 15,598; Referee: M. Heywood

6 November 2012 15	Hull City	2–1	Wolverhampton Wanderers	Kingston upon Hull
19:45 GMT	Aluko 29'; Simpson 51'; Evans (yellow card) 73'	Report	Ward (yellow card) 59'; Chester 67' (o.g.)	Stadium: KC Stadium; Attendance: 14,768; Referee: D. Webb

10 November 2012 16	Cardiff City	2–1	Hull City	Cardiff
15:00 GMT	Helguson 3'; Bo-Kyung (yellow card) 60'; Turner (yellow card) 71'; Hudson 82'	Report	Koren 90'	Stadium: Cardiff City Stadium; Attendance: 20,058; Referee: I. Williamson

17 November 2012 17	Birmingham City	2–3	Hull City	Birmingham
15:00 GMT	Morrison 38'; King 46'; Žigić (yellow card) 58'	Report	Aluko 14', 26'; Chester 33'; Meyler (yellow card) 90+3'	Stadium: St Andrew's; Attendance: 17,363; Referee: M. Russell

24 November 2012 18	Hull City	0–1	Burnley	Kingston upon Hull
15:00 GMT		Report	Marney 40'; Austin (yellow card) 41'; McCann (yellow card) 72'; Paterson (yellow card) 90+4'; Marney (yellow card) 90+5'	Stadium: KC Stadium; Attendance: 17,782; Referee: G. Sutton

27 November 2012 19	Hull City	0–0	Crystal Palace	Kingston upon Hull
19:45 GMT	Meyler (yellow card) 51'; Brady (yellow card) 78'; McLean (yellow card) 86'; Rosenior (yellow card) 90+2'	Report	Easter (yellow card) 37'	Stadium: KC Stadium; Attendance: 16,656; Referee: D. Drysdale

1 December 2012 20	Nottingham Forest	1–2	Hull City	Nottingham
15:00 GMT	Sharp 43' (pen.)	Report	Koren 34' (pen.); McShane 69'; Brady (yellow card) 86'; Stockdale (yellow card) 87'; Meyler (yellow card) 89'; Rosenior (yellow card) 90+3'	Stadium: City Ground; Attendance: 19,472; Referee: G. Ward

8 December 2012 21	Watford	1–2	Hull City	Watford
15:00 GMT	Deeney 90+2'	Report	Meyler 41'; Brady (yellow card) 69'; Brady 73'; Simpson (yellow card) 88'	Stadium: Vicarage Road; Attendance: 12,156; Referee: M. Haywood

15 December 2012 22	Hull City	2–0	Huddersfield Town	Kingston upon Hull
12:30 GMT	Koren 8'; Quinn (yellow card) 31'; Meyler (yellow card) 52'; Meyler 90+3'; A. Bruce (red card) (Note: Alex Bruce was issued with a red card by referee Howard Webb following the final whistle after an incident with Huddersfield's Alan Lee. Lee was subsequently issued with a three-match ban by the FA for violet conduct.)	Report	Southern (yellow card) 33'	Stadium: KC Stadium; Attendance: 16,488; Referee: Howard Webb

21 December 2012 23	Derby County	1–2	Hull City	Derby
19:45 GMT	Jacobs 45+1'	Report	Koren 25'; Faye 50'; Chester (yellow card) 60'; Meyler (yellow card) 70'; Evans (yellow card) 90+1'	Stadium: Pride Park Stadium; Attendance: 25,442; Referee: Darren Sheldrake

26 December 2012 24	Hull City	0–0	Leicester City	Kingston upon Hull
15:00 GMT		Report	De Laet (yellow card) 38'; Whitbread (yellow card) 65'	Stadium: KC Stadium; Attendance: 20,321; Referee: Craig Pawson

29 December 2012 25	Hull City	2–0	Leeds United	Kingston upon Hull
12:30 GMT	Evans 52'; Meyler 55'; Brady (yellow card) 76'	Report	White (yellow card) 35'; McCormack (yellow card) 44'; Brown (yellow card) 45+1'; Byram (yellow card) 70'	Stadium: KC Stadium; Attendance: 23,453; Referee: Geoff Eltringham

1 January 2013 26	Blackpool	0–0	Hull City	Blackpool
15:00 GMT	Taylor-Fletcher (yellow card) 73'	Report		Stadium: Bloomfield Road; Attendance: 13,691; Referee: A. Taylor

12 January 2013 27	Hull City	1–3	Sheffield Wednesday	Kingston upon Hull
17:20 GMT	Brady (yellow card) 62'; Koren 83'	Report	Johnson 24'; Jakupović 86' (o.g.); Antonio 90+6'	Stadium: KC Stadium; Attendance: 16,531; Referee: M. Haywood

19 January 2013 28	Peterborough United	1–1	Hull City	Peterborough
15:00 GMT	McCann 79' (pen.)	Report	Newell 33' (o.g.); McShane (yellow card) 67'; Evans (yellow card) 86'	Stadium: London Road Stadium; Attendance: 6,214; Referee: T. Bates

2 February 2013 29	Millwall	0–1	Hull City	South Bermondsey
15:00 GMT	Woolford (yellow card) 19'; Marquis (yellow card) 32'; Hulse (yellow card) 50'	Report	Meyler 1'; Quinn (yellow card) 66'	Stadium: The Den; Attendance: 9,589; Referee: P. Tierney

9 February 2013 30	Brighton and Hove Albion	1–0	Hull City	Brighton
17:20 GMT	Vicente 83'; El-Abd (yellow card) 84'	Report	Chester (yellow card) 90+1'	Stadium: Falmer Stadium; Attendance: 25,367; Referee: Stuart Attwell

12 February 2013 31	Hull City	2–1	Derby County	Kingston upon Hull
19:45 GMT	Meyler (yellow card) 43'; Evans (yellow card) 45+2'; Nagy 47'; Elmohamady 87'; Elmohamady (yellow card) 87'	Report	Bryson (yellow card) 29'; Coutts (yellow card) 39'; Jacobs (yellow card) 80'; Ward 84'; Roberts (red card) 89'	Stadium: KC Stadium; Attendance: 15,677; Referee: R. Madley

16 February 2013 32	Hull City	1–0	Charlton Athletic	Kingston upon Hull
15:00 GMT	Nagy (yellow card) 15'; Nagy 33'	Report	Fuller (yellow card) 39'; Jackson (yellow card) 51'	Stadium: KC Stadium; Attendance: 16,849; Referee: S. Mathieson

19 February 2013 33	Hull City	2–0	Blackburn Rovers	Kingston upon Hull
19:45 GMT	Nagy 52'; Elmohamady 67'; Evans (yellow card) 78'	Report	Kazim-Richards (yellow card) 27'; Orr (yellow card) 37'; Olsson (yellow card) 50'; Rekik (yellow card) 59'	Stadium: KC Stadium; Attendance: 15,981; Referee: T. Robinson

23 February 2013 34	Bolton Wanderers	4–1	Hull City	Bolton
15:00 GMT	Pratley 2'; Davies 5'; Dawson 8', 79'; Dawson (yellow card) 63'; Alonso (yellow card) 78'	Report	Meyler (yellow card) 52'; Brady 68'	Stadium: Reebok Stadium; Attendance: 17,655; Referee: A. Haines

2 March 2013 35	Hull City	5–2	Birmingham City	Kingston upon Hull
15:00 GMT	Boyd 1', 32'; Nagy 11', 76'; Koren 49'; Meyler (yellow card) 62'	Report	Lovenkrands 83'; Burke 87'	Stadium: KC Stadium; Attendance: 17,146; Referee: N. Miller

5 March 2013 36	Crystal Palace	4–2	Hull City	Selhurst
20:00 GMT	Phillips 45+4' (pen.), 52', 53'; Zaha 77'; Delaney 90+2'	Report	Meyler (yellow card) 38'; Simpson 73'; Meyler 90+2'	Stadium: Selhurst Park; Attendance: 16,230; Referee: M. Haywood

11 March 2013 37	Burnley	0–1	Hull City	Burnley
19:45 GMT		Report	A. Bruce (yellow card) 62'; Quinn 66'	Stadium: Turf Moor; Attendance: 10,450; Referee: Ilderton

16 March 2013 38	Hull City	1–2	Nottingham Forest	Kingston upon Hull
15:00 GMT	Nagy (yellow card) 40'; Boyd 45+2'; Brady (yellow card) 90+4'	Report	Jara (yellow card) 35'; Henderson 55'; Henderson (yellow card) 71'; Lansbury (yellow card) 74'; Cohen (yellow card) 75'; McGugan 84'; Darlow (yellow card) 90+1'	Stadium: KC Stadium; Attendance: 19,848; Referee: G. Scott

30 March 2013 39	Huddersfield Town	0–1	Hull City	Huddersfield
17:20 GMT	Danns (yellow card) 48'; Clayton (yellow card) 64'; Gobern (yellow card) 80'; Vaughan (yellow card) 86'	Report	Elmohamady (yellow card) 39'; Meyler (yellow card) 41'; Boyd 46'; Evans (yellow card) 86'; Hobbs (yellow card) 89'	Stadium: John Smith's Stadium; Attendance: 11,997; Referee: Darren Deadman

2 April 2013 40	Hull City	0–1	Watford	Kingston upon Hull
19:45 BST		Report	Deeney 41'; Ekstrand (yellow card) 90+3'	Stadium: KC Stadium; Attendance: 20,043; Referee: Bobby Madley

6 April 2013 41	Hull City	1–0	Middlesbrough	Kingston upon Hull
15:00 BST	Evans (yellow card) 59'; Brady 62'; Faye (yellow card) 77'; Rosenior (yellow card) 79'; Stockdale (yellow card) 90+5'	Report		Stadium: KC Stadium; Attendance: 17,901; Referee: S. Hooper

13 April 2013 42	Ipswich Town	1–2	Hull City	Ipswich
15:00 BST	Chopra (yellow card) 30'; Wordsworth 55'	Report	Brady 28' (pen.); Evans (yellow card) 37'; Koren 83'	Stadium: Portman Road; Attendance: 21,988; Referee: O. Langford

16 April 2013 43	Wolverhampton Wanderers	1–0	Hull City	Wolverhampton
19:45 BST	Doyle 55'; Henry (yellow card) 73'	Report	Fathy (yellow card) 75'; Brady (yellow card) 79'; Boyd (yellow card) 90+1'	Stadium: Molineux Stadium; Attendance: 19,641; Referee: Woolmer

19 April 2013 44	Hull City	0–0	Bristol City	Kingston upon Hull
19:45 BST		Report		Stadium: KC Stadium; Attendance: 18,595; Referee: M. Oliver

27 April 2013 45	Barnsley	2–0	Hull City	Barnsley
15:00 BST	Mellis 4'; Etuhu (yellow card) 15'; O'Grady 50'	Report		Stadium: Oakwell; Attendance: 15,744; Referee: C. Foy

4 May 2013 46	Hull City	2–2	Cardiff City	Kingston upon Hull
12:45 BST	Elmohamady (yellow card) 41'; Proschwitz 58'; McShane 63'; Proschwitz (yellow card) 90+1'	Report	Taylor (yellow card) 30'; Campbell 49'; Nugent (yellow card) 79'; Taylor (yellow card) 90' (yellow-red card); Gunnarsson (yellow card) 90+3'; Maynard 90+5' (pen.)	Stadium: KC Stadium; Attendance: 23,812; Referee: Stroud

==== Championship League table ====
Pos	Team	Pld	W	D	L	GF	GA	GD	Pts	Promotion or relegation
1	Cardiff City (C, P)	46	25	12	9	72	45	+27	87	Promotion to the Premier League
2	Hull City (P)	46	24	7	15	61	52	+9	79	Promotion to the Premier League
3	Watford	46	23	8	15	85	58	+27	77	Qualification for Championship play-offs
4	Brighton & Hove Albion	46	19	18	9	69	43	+26	75	Qualification for Championship play-offs
5	Crystal Palace (O, P)	46	19	15	12	73	62	+11	72	Qualification for Championship play-offs

Updated to match(es) played on 4 May 2013. Source: BBC Sport
Rules for classification: 1) points; 2) goal difference; 3) number of goals scored.
(C) Champions; (O) Play-off winners; (P) Promoted

==== Result round by round ====
Round	1	2	3	4	5	6	7	8	9	10	11	12	13	14	15	16	17	18	19	20	21	22	23	24	25	26	27	28	29	30	31	32	33	34	35	36	37	38	39	40	41	42	43	44	45	46
Ground	H	A	A	H	H	A	A	H	H	A	H	A	A	H	H	A	A	H	H	A	A	H	A	H	H	A	H	A	A	A	H	H	H	A	H	A	A	H	A	H	H	A	A	H	A	H
Result	W	L	D	W	W	W	L	L	L	W	W	L	W	W	W	L	W	L	D	W	W	W	W	D	W	D	L	D	W	L	W	W	W	L	W	L	W	L	W	L	W	W	L	D	L	D
Position	7	16	14	5	4	4	4	8	10	10	6	8	6	5	4	4	4	5	6	5	4	4	2	2	2	2	2	3	3	4	2	2	2	3	2	3	2	2	2	2	2	2	2	2	2	2

Updated to match(es) played on 4 May 2013. Source: Championship
A = Away; H = Home; W = Win; D = Draw; L = Loss

== League Cup ==
Hull City received a home match against local League Two side Rotherham United in the first round of the League Cup drawn on 14 June 2012. Following agreement between the clubs the date of the fixture was brought forward to Saturday 11 August 2012 and was the first competitive match of the 2012–13 season. Hull progressed to the next round winning 7–6 after a penalty shoot-out following a 1–1 draw at full-time and no further scoring during extra time. In the draw for the second round on 15 August 2012 Hull were given another local match away to League One side Doncaster Rovers. The match took place on 28 August 2012 at the Keepmoat Stadium and Doncaster won 3–2 after Hull had taken a two-goal lead. The game was marred by a tackle on Tom Cairney that would result in him missing three-months of the season and the sending off of Paul McKenna who had come on as a substitute for Cairney.

11 August 2012 Round 1	Hull City	1–1 (a.e.t.) (7–6 p)	Rotherham United	Kingston upon Hull
15:00 BST	McLean 70'	Report	Nardiello (yellow card) 31'; Ainsworth 52'	Stadium: KC Stadium; Referee: D. Sheldrake
	Penalties
	Fryatt (penalty scored); Koren (penalty scored); McLean (penalty scored); Proschwitz (penalty scored); Chester (penalty scored); Stewart (penalty scored); Cairney (penalty scored)		Noble (penalty scored); Mullins (penalty scored); Agard (penalty scored); Árnason (penalty scored); Pringle (penalty scored); Taylor (penalty scored); Mullins (penalty missed)

28 August 2012 Round 2	Doncaster Rovers	3–2	Hull City	Doncaster
19:45 BST	Syers 30', 90'; Keegan (yellow card) 50'; Jones 57'; Jones (yellow card) 79'	Report	McLean 1'; Simpson 10'; McKenna (red card) 79'	Stadium: Keepmoat Stadium; Attendance: 4,703; Referee: Steve Rushton

== FA Cup ==
Hull City enter the competition at the Third Round Proper stage with matches taking place in early January 2013. The draw for this took place at Wembley Stadium on 2 December 2012. Hull were drawn at home to either Alfreton Town or Leyton Orient. Later the same day Leyton Orient beat Alfreton Town 4–2 to set the League One team up with an away tie at the KC Stadium. The game took place on 5 January 2013 and resulted in a 1–1 draw with a replay to take place at Brisbane Road on 15 January 2013. The draw for the fourth round took place the following day and the winner of the replay was drawn at home to Barnsley. The replay finished in a 1–1 draw after full-time, with Hull getting a late goal in extra time to put them through to the fourth round. The fourth round match took place on 26 January 2013 at the KC Stadium and Barnsley ran out winners by a single Chris Dagnall goal.

5 January 2013 Third	Hull City	1–1	Leyton Orient	Kingston upon Hull
15:00 GMT	Proschwitz 90+4'	Report	Mooney 78'	Stadium: KC Stadium; Attendance: 8,585; Referee: I. Williamson

15 January 2013 Replay	Leyton Orient	1–2 (a.e.t.)	Hull City	Leyton
19:45 GMT	Cox 87'	Report	Proschwitz 41'; Dawson (yellow card) 80'; Bruce (yellow card) 107'; Cairney 117'	Stadium: Brisbane Road; Attendance: 3,601; Referee: Scott

26 January 2013 Fourth	Hull City	0–1	Barnsley	Kingston upon Hull
15:00 GMT	Brady (yellow card) 29'	Report	Wiseman (yellow card) 25'; Etuhu (yellow card) 36'; Dagnall 70'	Stadium: KC Stadium; Attendance: 9,932; Referee: K. Stroud

== Statistics ==
=== Captains ===
No.	P	Name	Country	No. games	Notes
10	MF	Robert Koren	(Slovenia)	38	
3	DF	Andy Dawson	(England)	5	Vice captain
6	DF	Jack Hobbs	(England)	4	Captain
23	DF	Abdoulaye Faye	(Senegal)	2	

Last updated: 11 May 2013
Source: Competitive match reports.
Competitive matches only
Matches started as captain only
Country: FIFA nationality; No.: Squad number; P: Position; Name: Player name; No. Games: Number of games started as captain.

=== Appearances ===
As of 11 May 2013

Appearances shown after a "+" indicate player came on during course of the match

No.	Pos	Nat	Player	Total		Championship		FA Cup		League Cup	
No.	Pos	Nat	Player	Apps	Goals	Apps	Goals	Apps	Goals	Apps	Goals
1	GK	(Switzerland) SUI	Eldin Jakupović	8	0	5	0	3	0	0	0
2	DF	(England) ENG	Liam Rosenior	36	0	15+17	0	3	0	1	0
3	DF	(England) ENG	Andy Dawson	7	0	3+1	0	2	0	1	0
4	MF	(England) ENG	Paul McKenna	13	0	6+4	0	1	0	1+1	0
5	DF	(England) ENG	James Chester	48	1	43+1	1	2	0	2	0
6	DF	(England) ENG	Jack Hobbs	22	0	20+2	0	0	0	0	0
7	MF	(England) ENG	Cameron Stewart	7	0	1+1	0	1+2	0	2	0
8	MF	(Northern Ireland) NIR	Corry Evans	34	1	23+9	1	1	0	1	0
9	FW	(England) ENG	Aaron McLean	16	3	3+11	1	0	0	1+1	2
10	MF	(Slovenia) SLO	Robert Koren	42	9	37+3	9	1	0	1	0
11	FW	(England) ENG	Jay Simpson	47	7	27+16	6	2+1	0	1	1
12	FW	(England) ENG	Matty Fryatt	5	0	2+2	0	0	0	1	0
13	GK	(England) ENG	Mark Oxley	1	0	1	0	0	0	0	0
14	MF	(Scotland) SCO	Tom Cairney	14	1	0+10	0	2	1	2	0
15	DF	(Republic of Ireland) IRL	Paul McShane	29	2	20+5	2	3	0	0+1	0
16	MF	(Nigeria) NGR	Seyi Olofinjana	16	0	9+3	0	2+1	0	1	0
17	DF	(Scotland) SCO	Liam Cooper	0	0	0	0	0	0	0	0
17	MF	(Egypt) EGY	Ahmed Fathy	7	0	1+6	0	0	0	0	0
19	DF	(Northern Ireland) NIR	Joe Dudgeon	11	0	9	0	0	0	2	0
20	MF	(Republic of Ireland) IRL	Jamie Devitt	0	0	0	0	0	0	0	0
21	FW	(England) ENG	Mark Cullen	1	0	0	0	1	0	0	0
22	GK	(England) ENG	Ben Amos	19	0	17	0	0	0	2	0
22	FW	(Egypt) EGY	Gedo	12	5	10+2	5	0	0	0	0
23	DF	(Senegal) SEN	Abdoulaye Faye	33	4	28+3	4	0	0	2	0
24	FW	(Nigeria) NGR	Sone Aluko	24	8	22+1	8	0	0	0+1	0
25	DF	(England) ENG	Danny East	0	0	0	0	0	0	0	0
27	MF	(Egypt) EGY	Ahmed Elmohamady	41	3	41	3	0	0	0	0
28	MF	(Northern Ireland) NIR	Alex Bruce	37	0	29+3	0	3	0	0+2	0
29	MF	(Republic of Ireland) IRL	Stephen Quinn	44	3	41+1	3	2	0	0	0
30	MF	(Republic of Ireland) IRL	Robbie Brady	34	4	28+4	4	2	0	0	0
31	MF	(Republic of Ireland) IRL	David Meyler	29	5	25+3	5	1	0	0	0
32	DF	(England) ENG	Conor Townsend	0	0	0	0	0	0	0	0
33	FW	(Germany) GER	Nick Proschwitz	32	5	5+22	3	4	2	1	0
34	GK	(England) ENG	David Stockdale	24	0	24	0	0	0	0	0
36	MF	(Northern Ireland) NIR	Dougie Wilson	1	0	0	0	0+1	0	0	0
37	FW	(Scotland) SCO	George Boyd	13	4	12+1	4	0	0	0	0

=== Top scorers ===
Player	Number	Position	Championship	FA Cup	League Cup	Total
Robert Koren	10	MF	9	0	0	9
Sone Aluko	24	FW	8	0	0	8
Jay Simpson	11	FW	6	0	1	7
Gedo	22	FW	5	0	0	5
Nick Proschwitz	33	FW	3	2	0	5
David Meyler	31	MF	5	0	0	5
George Boyd	37	FW	4	0	0	4
Robbie Brady	30	MF	4	0	0	4
Abdoulaye Faye	23	DF	4	0	0	4
Ahmed Elmohamady	27	MF	3	0	0	3
Aaron McLean	9	FW	1	0	2	3
Stephen Quinn	29	MF	3	0	0	3
Paul McShane	15	DF	2	0	0	2
James Chester	5	DF	1	0	0	1
Tom Cairney	14	MF	0	1	0	1
Corry Evans	8	MF	1	0	0	1
Total			59	3	3	65

=== Disciplinary record ===
Player	Number	Position	Championship		FA Cup		League Cup		Total	
Player	Number	Position	Yellow card	Red card	Yellow card	Red card	Yellow card	Red card	Yellow card	Red card
Alex Bruce	28	MF	2	1	1	0	0	0	3	1
Paul McKenna	4	MF	2	0	0	0	0	1	2	1
Corry Evans	8	MF	10	0	0	0	0	0	10	0
David Meyler	31	MF	10	0	0	0	0	0	10	0
Robbie Brady	30	MF	8	0	1	0	0	0	9	0
Ahmed Elmohamady	27	MF	4	0	0	0	0	0	4	0
Liam Rosenior	2	DF	3	0	0	0	0	0	3	0
James Chester	5	DF	2	0	0	0	0	0	2	0
Gedo	22	FW	2	0	0	0	0	0	2	0
Stephen Quinn	29	MF	2	0	0	0	0	0	2	0
Abdoulaye Faye	23	DF	2	0	0	0	0	0	2	0
Jay Simpson	11	FW	2	0	0	0	0	0	2	0
Sone Aluko	24	FW	1	0	0	0	0	0	1	0
Ben Amos	22	GK	1	0	0	0	0	0	1	0
George Boyd	37	FW	1	0	0	0	0	0	1	0
Andy Dawson	3	DF	0	0	1	0	0	0	1	0
Ahmed Fathy	17	MF	1	0	0	0	0	0	1	0
Jack Hobbs	6	DF	1	0	0	0	0	0	1	0
Aaron McLean	9	FW	1	0	0	0	0	0	1	0
Paul McShane	15	DF	1	0	0	0	0	0	1	0
Seyi Olofinjana	16	MF	1	0	0	0	0	0	1	0
Nick Proschwitz	33	FW	1	0	0	0	0	0	1	0
David Stockdale	34	GK	1	0	0	0	0	0	1	0
Total			59	1	3	0	0	1	62	2

== Transfers ==
This section only lists transfers and loans for the 2012–13 season, which began 1 July 2012. For transactions in May and June 2012, see transfers and loans for the 2011–12 season.

=== Players in ===
Date	Player	From	Fee	Ref
9 July 2012	(Switzerland) Eldin Jakupovic	(Greece) Aris		
19 July 2012	(Germany) Nick Proschwitz	(Germany) SC Paderborn	{£2.6 million (€3.3 million)	
20 July 2012	(Senegal) Abdoulaye Faye	(England) West Ham United	Free	
25 July 2012	(Nigeria) Sone Aluko	(Scotland) Rangers	Free	
30 July 2012	(Republic of Ireland) Alex Bruce	(England) Leeds United	Free	
31 August 2012	(Republic of Ireland) Stephen Quinn	(England) Sheffield United	Undisclosed	
8 January 2013	(Republic of Ireland) Robbie Brady	(England) Manchester United	Undisclosed	
8 January 2013	(Republic of Ireland) David Meyler	(England) Sunderland	Undisclosed	
17 June 2013	(Honduras) Maynor Figueroa	Free agent	Free	
25 June 2013	(England) Curtis Davies	(England) Birmingham City	Undisclosed	
28 June 2013	(Egypt) Ahmed Elmohamady	(England) Sunderland	Undisclosed	

=== Players out ===
Date	Player	To	Fee	Ref
5 January 2013	(Scotland) Liam Cooper	(England) Chesterfield	Undisclosed	
30 May 2013	(England) Andy Dawson	(England) Scunthorpe United	free	

=== Loans in ===
Date From	Player	From	Date To	Ref
31 July 2012	(England) Ben Amos	(England) Manchester United	4 January 2013	
30 August 2012	(Egypt) Ahmed Elmohamady	(England) Sunderland	16 January 2013	
5 November 2012	(Republic of Ireland) Robbie Brady	(England) Manchester United	2 January 2013	
8 November 2012	(Republic of Ireland) David Meyler	(England) Sunderland	1 January 2013	
22 November 2012	(England) David Stockdale	(England) Fulham	19 December 2012	
18 January 2013	(England) David Stockdale	(England) Fulham	30 June 2013	
31 January 2013	(Egypt) Ahmed Elmohamady	(England) Sunderland	30 June 2013	
31 January 2013	(Egypt) Ahmed Fathy	(Egypt) Al-Ahly	30 June 2013	
31 January 2013	(Egypt) Gedo	(Egypt) Al-Ahly	30 June 2013	
21 February 2013	(Scotland) George Boyd	(England) Peterborough United	30 June 2013	

=== Loans out ===
Date From	Player	To	Date To	Ref
6 August 2012	(England) Sonny Bradley	(England) Aldershot Town	30 June 2013	
8 August 2012	(England) Mark Cullen	(England) Bury	18 October 2012	
29 August 2012	(England) Danny East	(England) Northampton Town	5 January 2013	
31 August 2012	(England) Cameron Stewart	(England) Burnley	January 2013	
26 October 2012	(England) Mark Oxley	(England) Burton Albion	26 November 2012	
1 November 2012	(Scotland) Liam Cooper	(England) Chesterfield	5 January 2013	
1 November 2012	(Republic of Ireland) Jamie Devitt	(England) Rotherham United	1 December 2012	
20 November 2012	(England) Conor Townsend	(England) Chesterfield	20 December 2012	
4 January 2013	(Republic of Ireland) Jamie Devitt	(England) Grimsby Town	30 June 2013	
4 January 2013	(England) Aaron McLean	(England) Ipswich Town	30 June 2013	
25 January 2013	(England) Conor Townsend	(England) Chesterfield	30 June 2013	
25 January 2013	(England) Paul McKenna	(England) Fleetwood Town	30 June 2013	
31 January 2013	(England) Mark Cullen	(England) Stockport County	30 June 2013	
1 March 2013	(England) Cameron Stewart	(England) Blackburn Rovers	30 June 2013	
7 March 2013	(England) Danny East	(England) Gillingham	30 June 2013	
8 March 2013	(Northern Ireland) Dougie Wilson	(England) Grimsby Town	30 June 2013	
27 March 2013	(Nigeria) Seyi Olofinjana	(England) Sheffield Wednesday	30 June 2013	

== Kits ==
The new home kit was revealed on 14 June 2012 on the Hull City web site. The away kit was revealed on 15 August 2012 on the Hull City web site.

For the 2012–13 season, the main kit sponsor is Cash Converters and it is manufactured by Adidas.

Hull City's home kit for 2012–13.	Hull City's away kit for 2012–13.	Hull City's third kit for 2012–13, which was their 2011–12 away kit.

== Awards ==
The end of season awards were made at the KC Stadium on 20 April 2013. Ahmed Elmohamady was voted as the Player of the Season and Stephen Quinn took the prize for Players Player of the Year. The prize for the Goal of the Season was taken by Nick Proschwitz for his goal against Leyton Orient on 15 January 2013 in the FA Cup third round replay. Dougie Wilson was awarded the Young Player of the Year Award while Andy Dawson was given a Special Contribution Award for his testimonial year with the club.
