= David Meyler =

Irish association football player

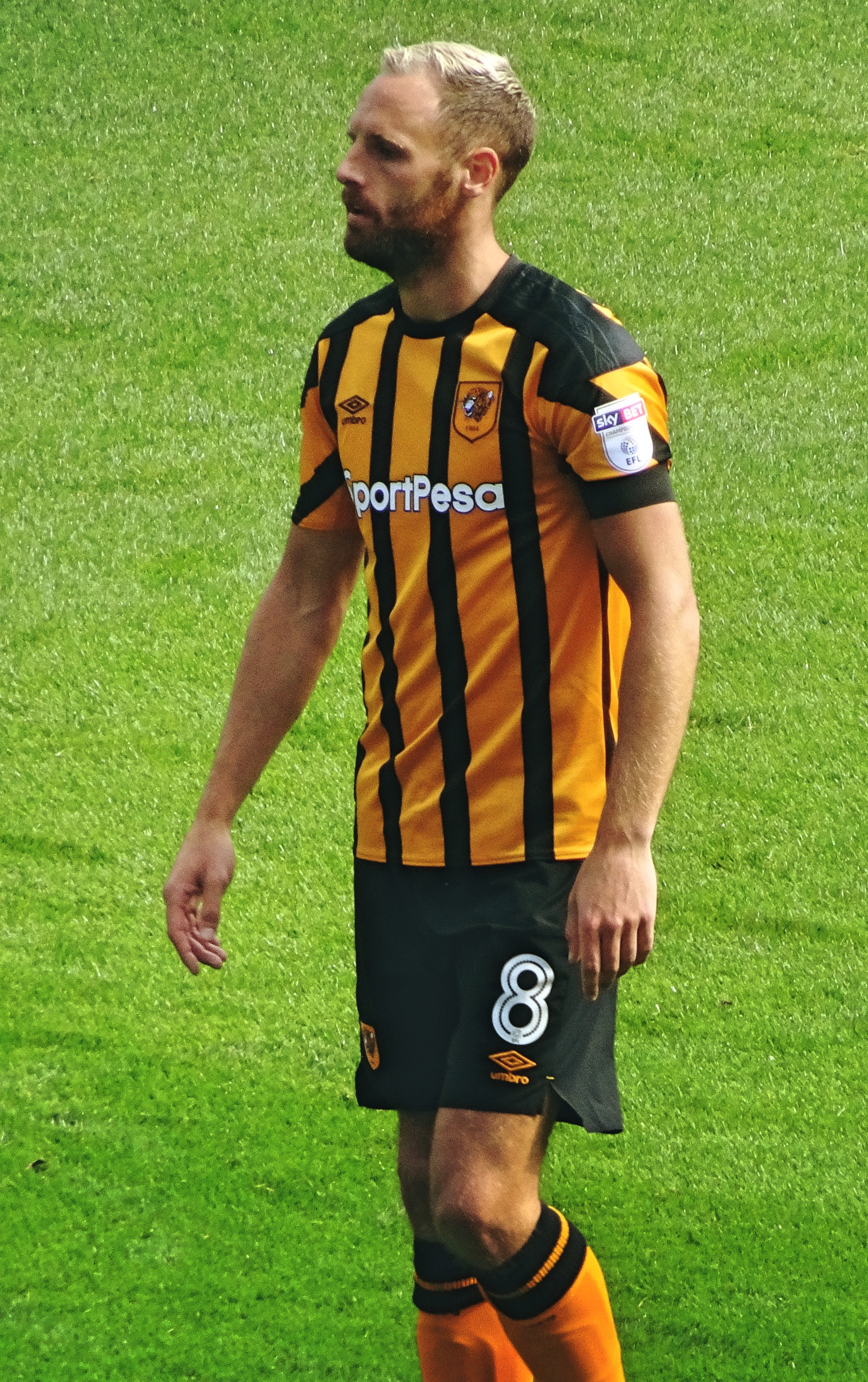
- Meyler playing for Hull City in 2017

Personal information
- Full name: David John Meyler
- Date of birth: 29 May 1989 (age 37)
- Place of birth: Cork, Ireland
- Height: 1.89 m (6 ft 2 in)
- Position: Central midfielder

Youth career
- Cork City

Senior career*
Years	Team	Apps	(Gls)
2008	Cork City	2	(0)
2008–2013	Sunderland	25	(0)
2012–2013	→ Hull City (loan)	10	(3)
2013–2018	Hull City	147	(13)
2018–2019	Reading	5	(0)
2019	→ Coventry City (loan)	5	(0)
Total		194	(16)

International career
2008	Republic of Ireland U19	2	(0)
2009–2010	Republic of Ireland U21	5	(0)
2012–2018	Republic of Ireland	26	(0)
- * Club domestic league appearances and goals

David John Meyler (born 29 May 1989) is an Irish former professional footballer who played as a central midfielder.

After turning professional at League of Ireland team Cork City, Meyler moved to Sunderland in the Premier League in 2008. He joined Hull City in 2013 after a short loan spell. Meyler moved to Reading in 2018, where he finished his career in 2019 after a brief loan spell at Coventry City.

Meyler was a full international for the Republic of Ireland between 2012 and 2018, playing 26 games.

== Early life ==
Meyler was born in Cork, Ireland, to Stella Bowles (medical laboratory technician) and John Meyler (GAA dual player and manager).

== Club career ==
=== Cork City ===
He progressed through the youth team of Cork City and signed a professional contract in 2008. He made three appearances for Cork, with his debut coming in a cup game against Limerick on 6 June 2008.

=== Sunderland ===
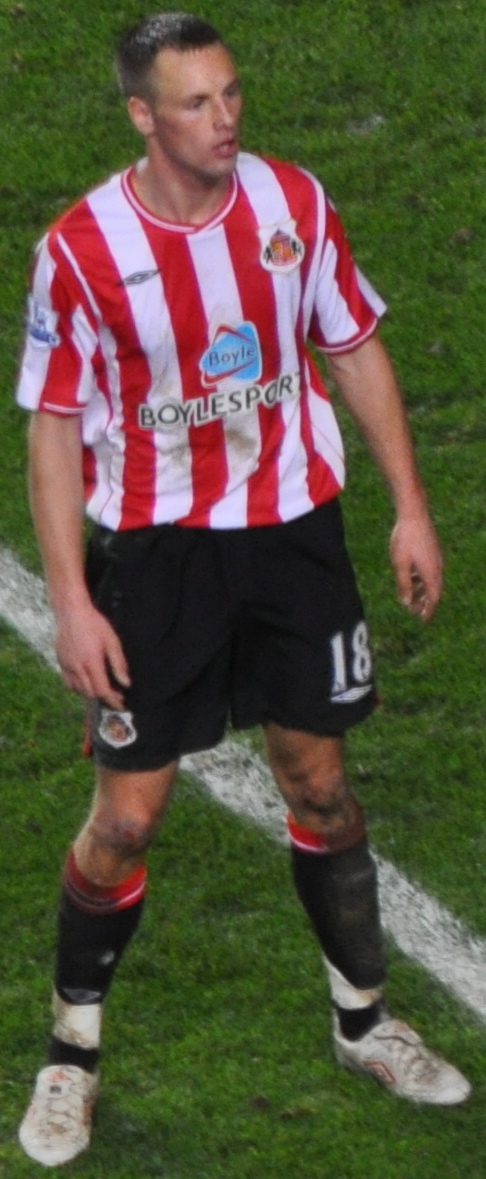
Meyler playing for Sunderland in 2010

Meyler joined Sunderland on 25 July 2008 for an undisclosed fee believed to be around £250,000 which has risen close to £500,000 after appearances and his first Republic of Ireland senior call-up. He became their third summer signing and followed the footsteps of former Cork City teammate Roy O'Donovan by moving to the Stadium of Light. However, it was not until a year and a half after joining Sunderland that Meyler made his first professional appearance for the club, starting against Blackburn Rovers on 28 December 2009. In his third appearance for Sunderland, at Portsmouth on 9 February 2010, Meyler received a straight red card just minutes after coming on as a second-half substitute. He suffered serious cruciate ligament damage against Manchester United on 2 May 2010, that was feared would leave him sidelined for as long as 12 months. However, he made a quicker recovery than expected, making his comeback for Sunderland's Reserves against Liverpool Reserves, on 2 November 2010. Manager Steve Bruce insisted Meyler would not be rushed back to first team action. Surprisingly, he returned in an away match at Fulham, featuring for 52 minutes in a 0–0 draw. On 5 January 2011, Meyler pulled up suddenly and was stretchered off in Sunderland's away match at Aston Villa. After the game, Bruce revealed that Meyler suffered cruciate ligament damage to the same knee as before. Later, Sunderland announced that Meyler had a scan on the knee and had torn his medial ligament. This ruled Meyler out for another 10 weeks at least rather than 6 months which was first feared. Meyler returned to the Sunderland bench for their defeat at Birmingham City on 16 April 2011.

Meyler continued to be eased back to fitness by Sunderland in the 2011–12 season, playing in several reserve fixtures before making a cameo substitute appearance in the 2–2 draw with West Bromwich Albion on 1 October 2011. He also came on as a late substitute against Aston Villa and Manchester United. Meyler's first appearance under Martin O'Neill came as a 63rd-minute substitute in the 4–1 win at Wigan Athletic on 3 January 2012. Meyler made his first start of the season at Stoke City on 4 February, and was involved in controversy when Robert Huth received a straight red card for a challenge on him. Sunderland went on to win 1–0, and Stoke manager Tony Pulis was unhappy with Meyler's reaction: "I think Robert commits himself them pulls out, and I don't think he actually touches Meyler, or whatever his name is, and I'm really disappointed at the player's reaction... I don't think Robert actually touches the lad, and the way he goes down and rolls around, for me he's done it for one reason and that was to get him sent off." Meyler did not start another game for the rest of the season, although he frequently appeared as a substitute.

=== Hull City ===
On 8 November 2012, Meyler was reunited with former manager Steve Bruce as he went out on loan to Hull City until 1 January 2013. He made his debut from the bench as a second-half substitute for Jay Simpson in the away match at Cardiff City on 10 November 2012. He scored his first goal for the club on 8 December 2012 when he opened the scoring in the 1–2 win against Watford at Vicarage Road. He scored again in the following game on 15 December, completing a 2–0 win at home to Huddersfield Town. On 8 January 2013, Meyler was signed by Hull permanently on a three-and-a-half-year contract for an undisclosed fee.

On 1 December 2013, Meyler scored his first Premier League goal against Liverpool in a 3–1 home win. Meyler was involved in a touchline scuffle on 1 March 2014 with Newcastle United manager Alan Pardew, who headbutted him. Eight days later, after scoring in a 3–0 FA Cup quarter-final win against former team Sunderland, Meyler headbutted the corner flag to mock the incident.

On 13 April 2014, he scored Hull's fifth goal in their 5–3 FA Cup semi-final victory against Sheffield United at Wembley Stadium. On 17 May 2014, he started in the 2014 FA Cup Final against Arsenal.

On 22 January 2016, Meyler signed a two-year extension to his contract with Hull City.

He was released by Hull at the end of the 2017–18 season.

=== Reading ===
On 5 June 2018, Reading announced the signing of Meyler on a two-year contract, with the option of a third, with the deal to be completed upon the conclusion of his Hull City contract on 30 June 2018.

On 31 July 2019, Meyler left Reading after his contract was terminated by mutual consent.

==== Coventry City loan ====
On 31 January 2019, Meyler joined Coventry City on loan until the end of the 2018–19 season.

=== Retirement ===
On 30 August 2019, Meyler announced his retirement from professional football.

== International career ==
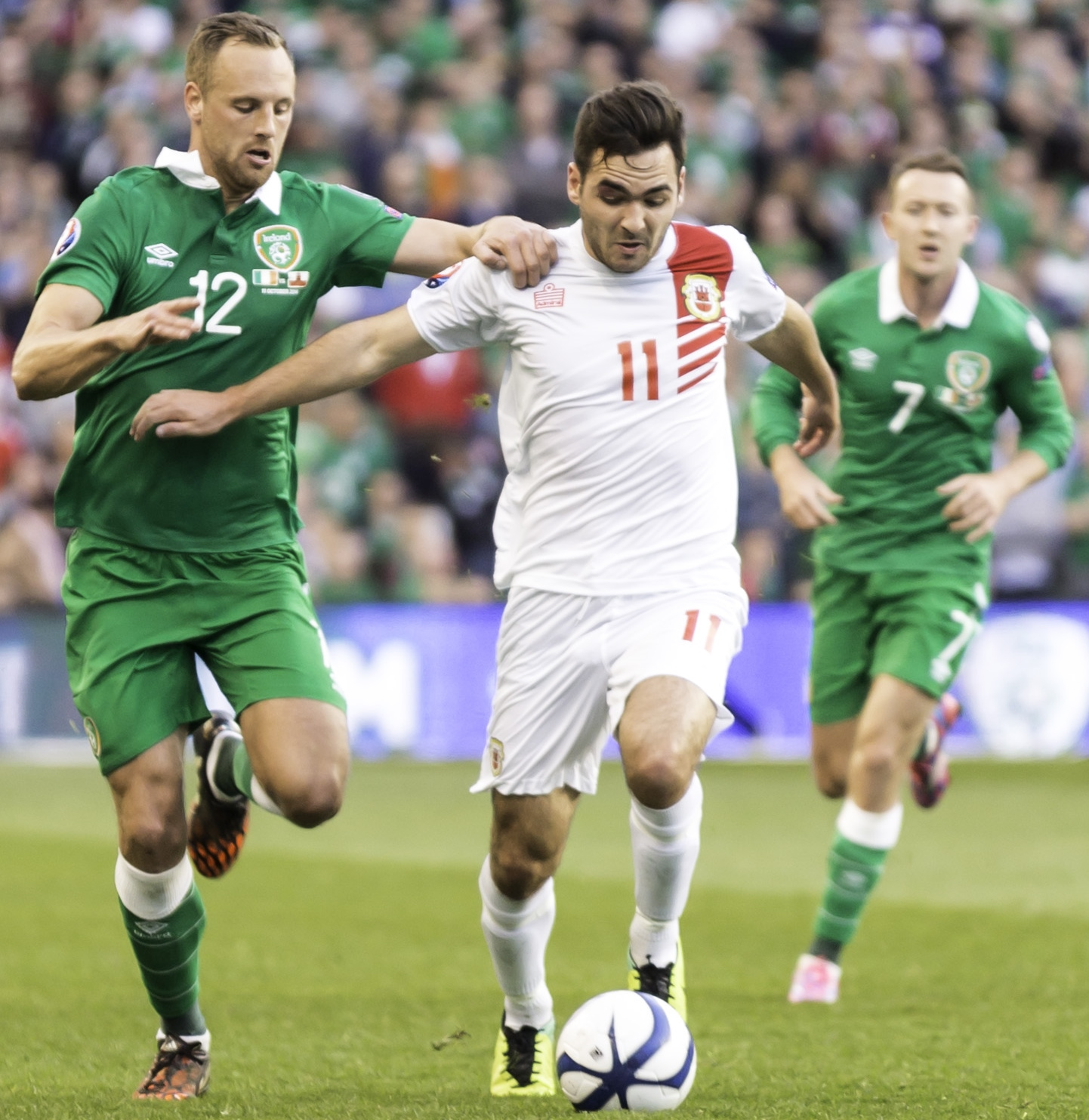
Meyler (left) playing for the Republic of Ireland in 2014

Meyler made his international debut in Cork for the Republic of Ireland U21 team in a 1–1 draw against Germany in February 2009. He had been selected for the Republic of Ireland senior squad when his first knee injury struck, forcing him to withdraw.

On 1 September 2012, Meyler was called up to the Republic of Ireland senior squad. He had been called up to the squad as a replacement for Darron Gibson who took a break from international football following Ireland's disappointing Euro 2012 campaign. He made his senior international debut in a 4–1 win over Oman at Craven Cottage on 11 September 2012. He represented the national team at 2016 European Championship, where they lost to France in round of 16.

== Coaching career ==
On 6 March 2023, Meyler joined the academy staff at Hull City as a casual Under-15s coach. In July 2024 he was promoted to assistant manager of the club's U18 side. On 30 May 2025, he was named assistant manager of League of Ireland club Cork City under newly appointed manager Gerard Nash. In June 2026, Meyler left Cork City to return to Hull City, taking up a coaching position with their U21 side.

== Career statistics ==
Appearances and goals by club, season and competition
Club	Season	League			National cup		League cup		Other		Total	
Club	Season	Division	Apps	Goals	Apps	Goals	Apps	Goals	Apps	Goals	Apps	Goals
Cork City	2008	League of Ireland Premier Division	2	0	1	0	0	0	0	0	3	0
Sunderland	2009–10	Premier League	10	0	2	0	0	0	0	0	12	0
Sunderland	2010–11	Premier League	5	0	0	0	0	0	0	0	5	0
Sunderland	2011–12	Premier League	7	0	2	0	0	0	0	0	9	0
Sunderland	2012–13	Premier League	3	0	0	0	2	0	0	0	5	0
Sunderland	Total		25	0	4	0	2	0	0	0	31	0
Hull City (loan)	2012–13	Championship	10	3	0	0	0	0	0	0	10	3
Hull City	2012–13	Championship	18	2	1	0	0	0	0	0	19	2
Hull City	2013–14	Premier League	30	2	7	2	3	0	0	0	40	4
Hull City	2014–15	Premier League	28	1	0	0	1	0	3 (Note: Appearances in UEFA Europa League)	0	32	1
Hull City	2015–16	Championship	26	2	3	0	4	1	2 (Note: Appearances in Championship play-offs)	0	35	3
Hull City	2016–17	Premier League	20	1	2	0	6	0	0	0	28	1
Hull City	2017–18	Championship	25	5	2	0	0	0	0	0	27	5
Hull City	Total		147	13	15	2	14	1	5	0	181	16
Reading	2018–19	Championship	5	0	0	0	0	0	0	0	5	0
Coventry City (loan)	2018–19	League One	5	0	0	0	0	0	0	0	5	0
Career total			194	16	20	2	16	1	5	0	235	19

== Honours ==
Hull City

- Football League Championship runner-up: 2012–13
- FA Cup runner-up: 2013–14
- Football League Championship play-offs: 2016
