= Liam Rosenior =

English football manager (born 1984)

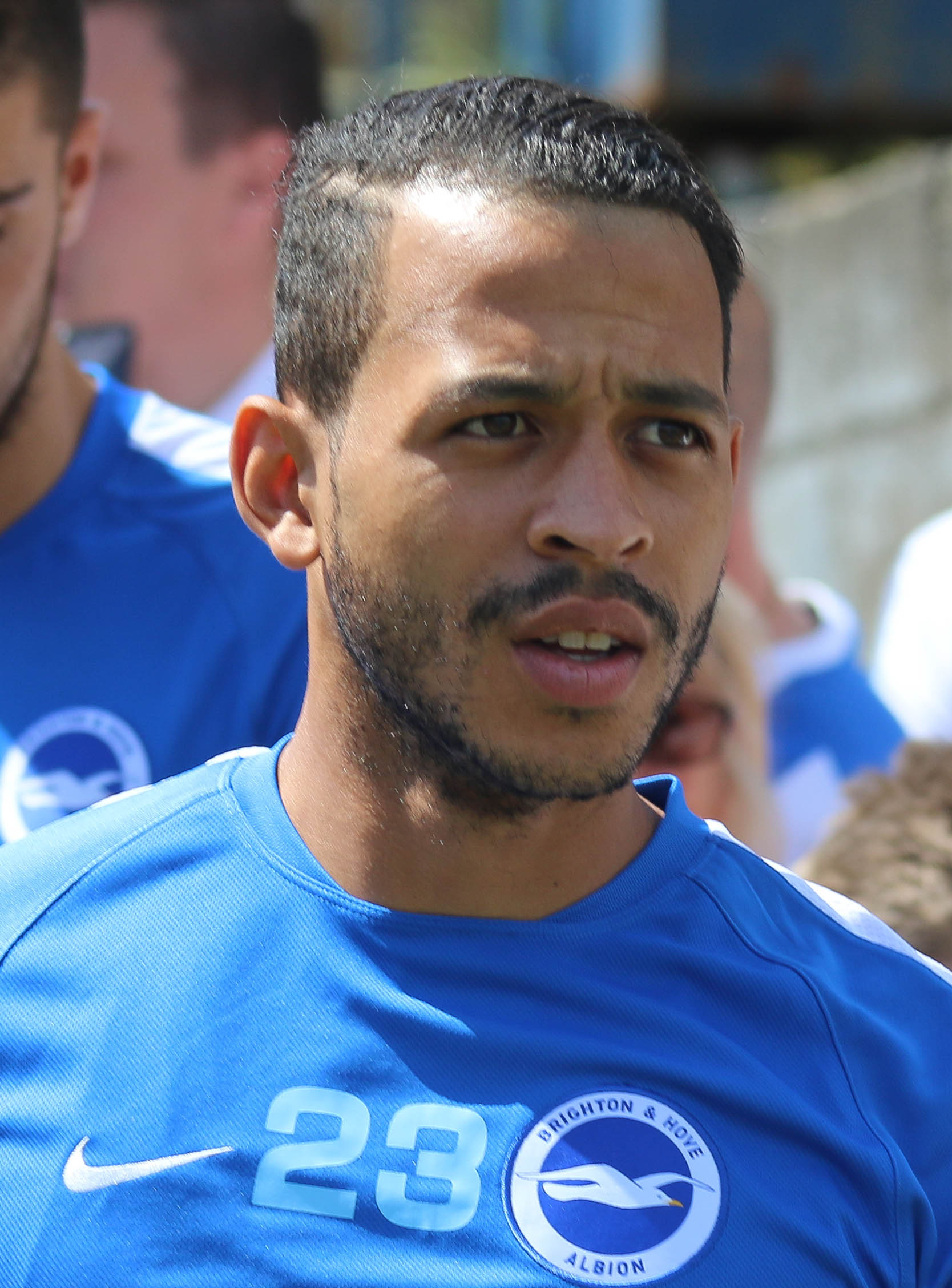
- Rosenior with Brighton & Hove Albion in 2015

Personal information
- Full name: Liam James Rosenior
- Date of birth: 9 July 1984 (age 42)
- Place of birth: Wandsworth, England
- Height: 5 ft 9 in (1.75 m)
- Position: Right-back

Team information
- Current team: Paris FC (head coach)

Youth career
- 2001–2002: Bristol City

Senior career*
Years	Team	Apps	(Gls)
2002–2003	Bristol City	23	(2)
2003–2007	Fulham	79	(0)
2004	→ Torquay United (loan)	10	(0)
2007–2010	Reading	64	(0)
2009–2010	→ Ipswich Town (loan)	29	(1)
2010–2015	Hull City	144	(1)
2015–2018	Brighton & Hove Albion	44	(0)
Total		393	(4)

International career
2005	England U20	4	(1)
2005–2007	England U21	7	(0)

Managerial career
- 2022: Derby County (interim)
- 2022–2024: Hull City
- 2024–2026: Strasbourg
- 2026: Chelsea
- 2026–: Paris FC
- * Club domestic league appearances and goals

Liam James Rosenior (born 9 July 1984) is an English professional football manager and former player who is the head coach of Ligue 1 club Paris FC.

As a player, he usually played as a right-back, although he occasionally was moved to left-back and sometimes deployed as a right-winger. During his career, Rosenior played for Bristol City, Fulham, Torquay United, Reading, Ipswich Town, Hull City, and Brighton & Hove Albion. He is a former England under-20 and under-21 international with a combined total of 11 caps and one goal.

Rosenior was interim manager at Derby County in 2022 and managed his former club Hull from November 2022 to May 2024. In July 2024, he was named as head coach of Strasbourg in Ligue 1. On 6 January 2026, Rosenior was appointed as the head coach of Chelsea on a five-and-a-half-year deal. However, due to a poor run of form which included five consecutive Premier League losses, the club dismissed him from the role on 22 April 2026.

== Club career ==
=== Bristol City ===
Born in Wandsworth in London, Rosenior started his career with Bristol City as a midfielder. He made his debut in the Football League Second Division on 20 April 2002, coming on as a 66th-minute substitute for Joe Burnell and seconds later assisting the equaliser for Aaron Brown in a 1–1 home draw with Stoke City.

On 28 December 2002, Rosenior scored his first goal in a 4–1 win away to Stockport County, having earlier assisted Danny Coles. He scored the second goal in a 2–0 victory for Bristol City against Carlisle United in the 2003 Football League Trophy final at the Millennium Stadium. In the first round of Bristol City's cup run they defeated Queens Park Rangers on penalties, and Rosenior scored the winning penalty in the shootout.

=== Fulham ===
On 12 November 2003, Rosenior joined Premier League club Fulham for a £55,000 fee. In 2004 he was loaned to Torquay United of the Football League Third Division, managed by his father Leroy Rosenior.

Rosenior made his debut for Fulham on 22 September 2004 in a League Cup game away to Boston United, being sent off in the last minute of a 4–1 win for diving in the hope of winning a penalty. He made his league debut for Fulham on 13 December in a 1–1 home draw with Manchester United, earning the Sky Sports Man of the Match award. On 7 May 2005, his season ended with another dismissal in a 3–1 win at Blackburn Rovers for pushing Robbie Savage in response to the Welshman's foul on Luís Boa Morte.

Rosenior scored once for Fulham, in a League Cup tie against Lincoln City at Craven Cottage on 21 September 2005, netting in extra time of a 5–4 win. He signed a four-year extension to his Fulham contract in July 2006.

=== Reading ===
Rosenior joined fellow Premier League team Reading on 31 August 2007 for an undisclosed fee on a three-year contract, with Seol Ki-Hyeon going the other way. His debut for Reading came in a 2–1 defeat to Sunderland on 15 September, and he scored his first goal for Reading in a 7–4 defeat to Portsmouth two weeks later, although it was initially awarded to Stephen Hunt.

On 2 September 2009, Rosenior joined Championship club Ipswich Town on loan for the remainder of 2009–10 season, under manager Roy Keane. He scored once in 31 games for the club, equalising in a 2–1 loss at Barnsley on 3 October.

=== Hull City ===
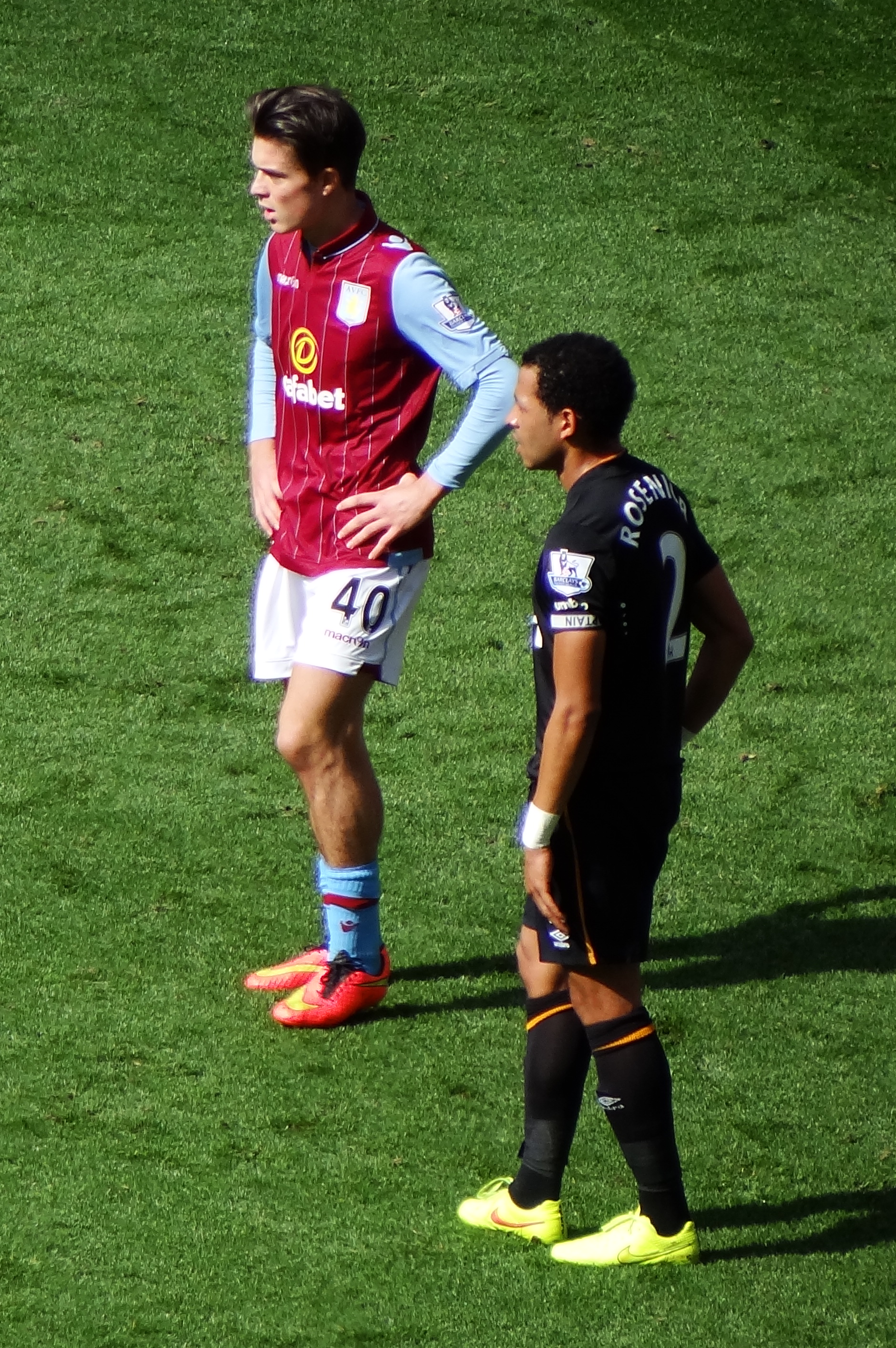
Rosenior (right) playing for Hull City alongside Jack Grealish of Aston Villa in 2014

Rosenior had a trial spell at Bristol City in July 2010, following the expiry of his contract at Reading. On 29 October 2010, Rosenior joined Hull City on a short-term agreement until 1 January 2011. He made his debut the following day in the away match at Barnsley. He signed a 2 1/2-year deal with Hull on 21 December 2010. He added "I'm delighted, It's something that we kind of half agreed when I first came here, but it relied on the takeover being completed for me to stay."

On 22 March 2014, Rosenior scored his only goal for Hull City when heading the rebound in from a Nikica Jelavić penalty that was saved by West Bromwich Albion goalkeeper Ben Foster. On 17 May 2014, he started in the 2014 FA Cup final against Arsenal. On 28 May 2015, Hull City released Rosenior and five other players who were out of contract at the end of the 2014–15 season.

=== Brighton & Hove Albion ===
On 23 June 2015, Rosenior signed for Brighton & Hove Albion on a three-year deal following his release from Hull City. He retired from his playing career on 30 July 2018.

== International career ==
Rosenior was born in England, and is of Sierra Leonean descent through his father, Leroy Rosenior, who was an international footballer for Sierra Leone. Rosenior was called up to the England U21 squad in March 2005, and made his debut in a 2–2 draw with Germany U21 on 25 March 2005, closely followed by a second cap in a 2–0 win over Azerbaijan U21 on 29 March 2005. His performances earned him a call up to the England U20 squad for the Toulon Tournament in June 2005, where he played three times and scored one goal.

However, it would be over a year and a half before he would add to his England U21 caps, with the next one coming against Netherlands U21 on 14 November 2006. Rosenior made it into the squad for the 2007 UEFA European Under-21 Championship, but only made one appearance, as a substitute in the semi-final against the Netherlands. He took part in the penalty shoot-out, scoring his penalty but England lost 13–12. Due to his age, this would prove to be his seventh and last appearance for the England U21 team.

== Coaching career ==
=== Early career ===
Following his retirement from playing, Rosenior remained at Brighton, taking up the position of Brighton's u-23 assistant coach, which he combined with appearing as a pundit on Sky Sports.

On 10 July 2019, Rosenior was appointed as specialist first team coach to Phillip Cocu at Derby County. He was appointed assistant manager of the club on 15 January 2021 following the appointment of Wayne Rooney as manager.

Following Rooney's resignation on 24 June 2022, Rosenior took over as interim manager. He was relieved of his duties as manager on 21 September 2022 while still employed by the club as Derby sought a permanent manager. Following the appointment of Paul Warne, Rosenior left the club.

=== Hull City ===
On 3 November 2022, Rosenior was appointed head coach at Hull City on a two-and-a-half-year deal, returning to the club where he made 161 appearances between 2010 and 2015.

On 17 December 2023, Hull City announced that Rosenior had signed a new three-year contract, keeping him at the club until 2026.

In April 2024, Rosenior suffered online racist abuse after being nominated for the EFL Championship Manager of the Season award.

On 7 May 2024, after a seventh-place finish for Hull City caused the team to narrowly miss out on the play-offs, Rosenior was dismissed. Hull City owner, Acun Ilicali said that Rosenior had been sacked over a difference on football philosophy between the two with Ilicali wanting attacking football and Rosenior unable to offer that as a manager.

=== Strasbourg ===
On 25 July 2024, Rosenior was appointed as the new head coach of Ligue 1 club Strasbourg, joining the BlueCo club on a three-year deal. He replaced Patrick Vieira, who had left by mutual consent after finishing 13th. Rosenior's debut on 18 August saw him field the French top flight's first starting XI in which all outfield players were aged under 23, in a 1–1 draw at Montpellier.

On 25 April 2025, Rosenior extended his contract with Strasbourg for three years, until June 2028, after reportedly turning down multiple approaches from Premier League clubs. He finished his first season in France in 7th place, qualifying for the UEFA Conference League.

=== Chelsea ===
On 6 January 2026, Rosenior was appointed as Chelsea's head coach on a six-and-a-half-year deal. He began working with the squad after their league match against Fulham on 7 January. In his first match in charge, he oversaw a 5–1 away win against Charlton Athletic in the third round of the FA Cup, becoming the first Chelsea manager to win his opening match since Antonio Conte in 2016. After a run of five consecutive league defeats without scoring, the club's worst winless and goalless run in the league since 1912, Rosenior was dismissed on 22 April with the club seventh in the table.

=== Paris FC ===
On 7 July 2026, Rosenior was appointed as head coach of Ligue 1 side Paris FC, signing a two-year deal with the club. On 19 September, a league match between Paris FC and Strasbourg was halted due to abusive chants directed at Rosenior by Strasbourg fans. After the match, which Paris FC won 2–1, Rosenior sparked a confrontation between players and staff from both clubs by celebrating in front of the visiting Strasbourg fans.

== Personal life ==
Rosenior is married to Erika Quinones. The couple have four children.

He is the son of former manager and player Leroy Rosenior. From an early age, Rosenior displayed an obsession with the tactical side of the game. At the age of nine, he reportedly read the FA Coaching Book of Soccer Tactics and Skills by Charles Hughes. He also maintained a childhood "tactical ritual" with his father where they would spend Friday nights eating fish and chips while analysing the following day's match lineups and set-piece routines. His father later recalled that as a young child, Liam would often "pretend to sleep" on the sofa when his father's footballing friends visited so that he could listen to their tactical discussions rather than being sent to bed.

In June 2020, Rosenior wrote an open letter to Donald Trump during his first term as US president. In the letter, Rosenior criticised Trump's handling of the aftermath of the murder of George Floyd.

His father, Leroy, recalled that Rosenior preferred strategy games such as ‘‘Battleships’’ to conventional toys as a child.Wiechula, Frank (13 March 2007). "Liam Rosenior does his own thing". The Times – via Fulhamweb. Rosenior has described spending Friday evenings with his brother eating fish and chips while their father ate a kebab, as they discussed team selection, tactics, set pieces and substitutions for Leroy’s match the following day.Bloom, Ben (6 January 2026). "Who is Chelsea's new head coach Liam Rosenior?". PremierLeague.com. Premier League.

== Career statistics ==
Appearances and goals by club, season and competition
Club	Season	League			FA Cup		League Cup		Europe		Other		Total	
Club	Season	Division	Apps	Goals	Apps	Goals	Apps	Goals	Apps	Goals	Apps	Goals	Apps	Goals
Bristol City	2001–02	Second Division	1	0	0	0	0	0	—		0	0	1	0
Bristol City	2002–03	Second Division	22	2	1	0	0	0	—		4 (Note: Appearances in Football League Trophy)	1	27	3
Bristol City	Total		23	2	1	0	0	0	—		4	1	28	3
Fulham	2003–04	Premier League	0	0	—		0	0	—		—		0	0
Fulham	2004–05	Premier League	17	0	4	0	2	0	—		—		23	0
Fulham	2005–06	Premier League	24	0	1	0	2	1	—		—		27	1
Fulham	2006–07	Premier League	38	0	3	0	1	0	—		—		42	0
Fulham	2007–08	Premier League	0	0	—		0	0	—		—		0	0
Fulham	Total		79	0	8	0	5	1	—		—		92	1
Torquay United (loan)	2003–04	Third Division	10	0	—		—		—		—		10	0
Reading	2007–08	Premier League	17	0	2	0	0	0	—		—		19	0
Reading	2008–09	Championship	42	0	0	0	0	0	—		2 (Note: Appearances in Football League play-offs)	0	44	0
Reading	2009–10	Championship	5	0	—		1	0	—		—		6	0
Reading	Total		64	0	2	0	1	0	—		2	0	69	0
Ipswich Town (loan)	2009–10	Championship	29	1	2	0	—		—		—		31	1
Hull City	2010–11	Championship	26	0	—		0	0	—		—		26	0
Hull City	2011–12	Championship	44	0	0	0	0	0	—		—		44	0
Hull City	2012–13	Championship	32	0	3	0	1	0	—		—		36	0
Hull City	2013–14	Premier League	29	1	5	0	3	0	—		—		37	1
Hull City	2014–15	Premier League	13	0	0	0	1	0	4 (Note: Appearances in UEFA Europa League)	0	—		18	0
Hull City	Total		144	1	8	0	5	0	4	0	—		161	1
Brighton & Hove Albion	2015–16	Championship	31	0	0	0	2	0	—		2	0	35	0
Brighton & Hove Albion	2016–17	Championship	10	0	0	0	0	0	—		—		10	0
Brighton & Hove Albion	2017–18	Premier League	3	0	1	0	2	0	—		—		6	0
Brighton & Hove Albion	Total		44	0	1	0	4	0	—		2	0	51	0
Brighton & Hove Albion U21/U23	2016–17	—			—		—		—		1 (Note: Appearance in EFL Trophy)	0	1	0
Brighton & Hove Albion U21/U23	2017–18	—			—		—		—		1	0	1	0
Brighton & Hove Albion U21/U23	Total	—			—		—		—		2	0	2	0
Career total			393	4	22	0	15	1	4	0	10	1	444	6

== Managerial statistics ==
As of match played 22 November 2026

Managerial record by team and tenure
Team	From	To	Record					Ref.
Team	From	To	P	W	D	L	Win %	Ref.
Derby County (interim)	24 June 2022	22 September 2022	12	7	2	3	58.3	
Hull City	3 November 2022	7 May 2024	78	27	28	23	34.6	
Strasbourg	25 July 2024	6 January 2026	63	31	15	17	49.2	
Chelsea	8 January 2026	22 April 2026	23	11	2	10	47.8	
Paris FC	7 July 2026	present	11	7	2	2	63.6	
Total			187	83	49	55	44.4	

== Honours ==
=== Player ===
Bristol City

- Football League Trophy: 2002–03

Hull City

- FA Cup runner-up: 2013–14
