= 2014 FA Cup final =

English association football match

- The match was played at Wembley Stadium.
- Event: 2013–14 FA Cup
Arsenal	Hull City
3	2
- After extra time
- Date: 17 May 2014
- Venue: Wembley Stadium, London
- Man of the Match: Aaron Ramsey (Arsenal)
- Referee: Lee Probert (Wiltshire)
- Attendance: 89,345
- Weather: Partly, mostly cloudy 22 °C (72 °F)

The 2014 FA Cup final was an association football match between Premier League clubs Arsenal and Hull City at Wembley Stadium in London, England, on 17 May 2014. It was the 133rd FA Cup final overall and the showpiece match of English football's primary cup competition, the Football Association Challenge Cup (FA Cup), organised by the Football Association (FA). Hull made their first appearance in an FA Cup Final, while Arsenal equalled Manchester United's record of 18 final appearances.

Each club needed to win five matches to reach the final. Arsenal beat three of their divisional rivals and needed to win a penalty shoot-out to defeat cup holders Wigan Athletic. In contrast, four of Hull's opponents were from the lower divisions; they played one replay in the fifth round against Brighton & Hove Albion.

The final was refereed by Lee Probert in front of 89,345 spectators. Hull scored two goals in the opening ten minutes from James Chester and Curtis Davies, but Arsenal came back with goals from Santi Cazorla and Laurent Koscielny to level the match by the end of normal time, necessitating extra time. Aaron Ramsey scored the winner 11 minutes from the end of the additional period. The victory secured a joint-record 11th victory in the competition for Arsenal. Because Arsenal had already qualified for the 2014–15 UEFA Champions League via their league position, Hull qualified for the 2014–15 UEFA Europa League, entering at the third qualifying round.

== Background ==
The FA Cup is an annual knockout tournament involving professional and amateur men's football clubs in the English football league system. It is the world's oldest football competition. The 2014 final was the 133rd to be played since it was first held in 1872.

Arsenal were making their 18th appearance in an FA Cup Final, equalling the record set by Manchester United. They had last played in the FA Cup final in 2005, when they defeated Manchester United 5–4 in a penalty shoot-out after the match finished goalless. Conversely, this was Hull City's first appearance in an FA Cup Final since the club was founded in 1904. Arsenal's top scorer during the season was Olivier Giroud with 16 goals in the league and 6 in other competitions, followed by Aaron Ramsey with 10 in the league and 6 others. Hull's leading scorer was Matty Fryatt with 6 goals, 4 of which had come in the FA Cup. Arsenal won both of the league matches between the sides during the 2013–14 season. The fixture at Arsenal's home ground, the Emirates Stadium in London, in November 2013 ended 2–0, while the return game at the KC Stadium in Hull the following April saw Arsenal record a 3–0 victory.

== Route to the final ==
=== Arsenal ===
Round	Opposition	Score
3rd	Tottenham Hotspur (H)	2–0
4th	Coventry City (H)	4–0
5th	Liverpool (H)	2–1
6th	Everton (H)	4–1
SF	Wigan Athletic (N)	1–1 (aet); 2–4 (P)
Key: (H) = Home venue; (A) = Away venue; (N) = Neutral venue

As a Premier League club, Arsenal entered the competition in the third round, where they faced their north London rivals, Tottenham Hotspur, at the Emirates Stadium. Santi Cazorla opened the scoring for Arsenal in the 31st minute when he struck Serge Gnabry's pass first time past Hugo Lloris, the Tottenham goalkeeper. Midway through the second half, Tottenham's Danny Rose hesitated in possession, allowing Tomáš Rosický to win the ball and lift it over Lloris to double Arsenal's lead. With less than 10 minutes remaining, Arsenal's Theo Walcott was taken off the pitch injured on a stretcher; he was later ruled out for more than six months with a ruptured anterior cruciate ligament. The match ended 2–0 and Arsenal progressed to the fourth round. There, they were drawn at home again, this time against Coventry City of League One. Lukas Podolski gave Arsenal a 2–0 lead within the first half-hour, scoring from Mesut Özil's pass before doubling his tally by heading in a pass from Per Mertesacker. Giroud and Cazorla both scored close-range goals in the last 10 minutes of the second half, to give Arsenal a 4–0 victory.

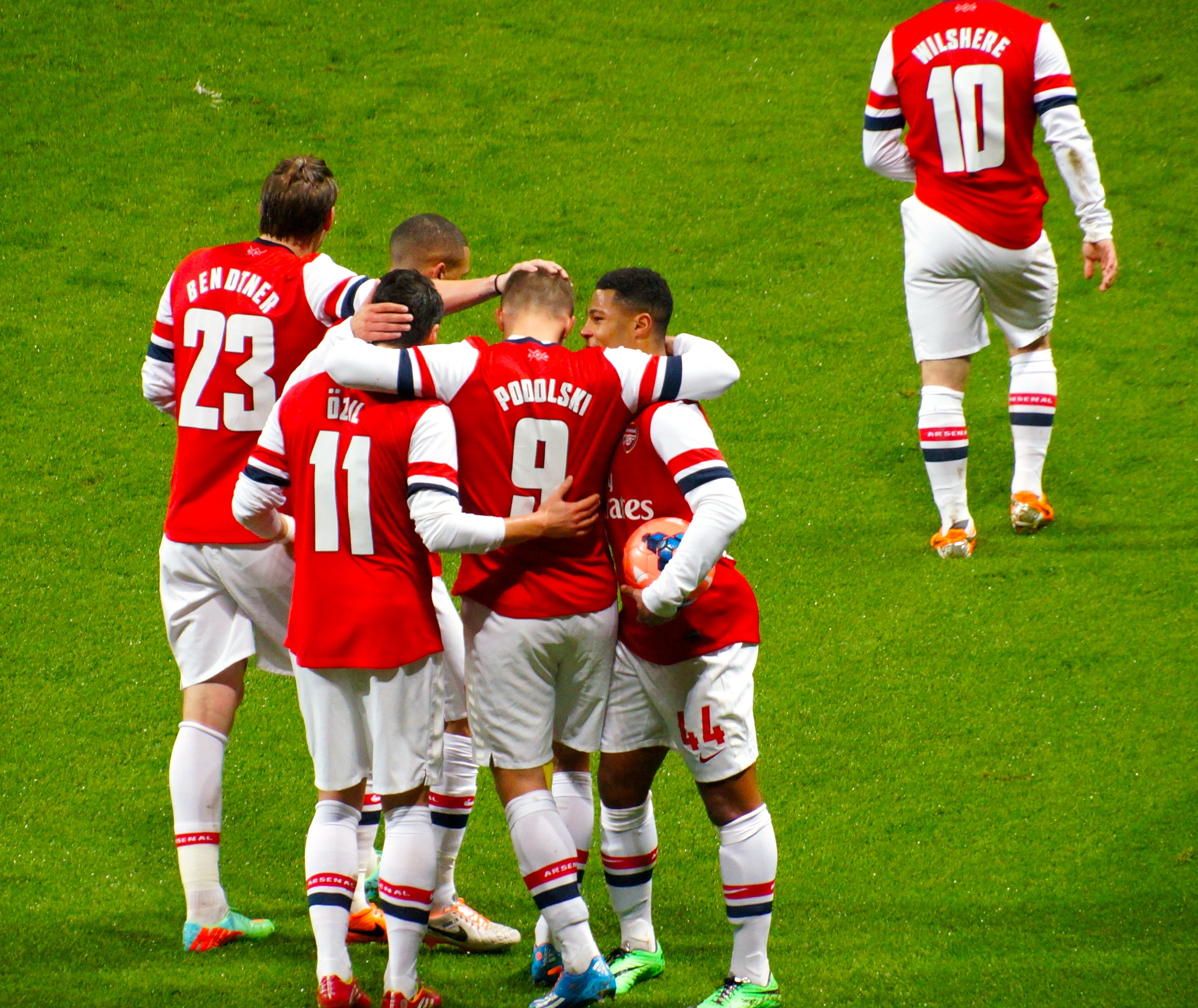
Arsenal players celebrating Lukas Podolski's goal against Coventry City

For the fifth round, Arsenal were drawn against Liverpool at home, against whom they had lost 5–1 in the Premier League the previous week. Alex Oxlade-Chamberlain opened the scoring in the 16th minute from inside the Liverpool penalty area after Yaya Sanogo's shot was blocked by Steven Gerrard. Podolski doubled their lead two minutes after half-time from 15 yards (14 m), when he converted a cross from Oxlade-Chamberlain. In the 59th minute, Podolski fouled Luis Suárez and Gerrard scored the resulting penalty. Despite dominating the closing stages of the match, Liverpool failed to score again and the match ended 2–1. In the sixth round, Arsenal were again at home where they faced Everton. Özil scored from a Cazorla pass to give Arsenal the lead in the 7th minute, but Everton equalised through Romelu Lukaku from close range in the 32nd. Midway through the second half, Oxlade-Chamberlain was fouled by Gareth Barry to concede a penalty; Mikel Arteta scored on the second attempt after his first successful strike was ruled out as Giroud was deemed to have encroached on the penalty area. Giroud then scored twice in three minutes late on to secure a 4–1 win for Arsenal.

In their semi-final at Wembley Stadium, which was a neutral venue, Arsenal were drawn against the defending FA Cup holders, Championship side Wigan Athletic. After a goalless first half, Wigan took the lead after Callum McManaman was brought down in the Arsenal penalty area by Mertesacker and Jordi Gómez converted the subsequent penalty. With eight minutes of the match remaining, Mertesacker scored with a header from a mishit shot by Kieran Gibbs. Regular time ended with the scores level at 1–1, and with no goals in extra time, the match went to a penalty shoot-out. Łukasz Fabiański saved Wigan's first two penalties from Gary Caldwell and Jack Collison and as all subsequent strikes were scored, Arsenal won 4–2 and proceeded to the final. In doing so, Arsenal matched their achievement from the 1949–50 FA Cup, when they reached the final without leaving London.

=== Hull City ===
Round	Opposition	Score
3rd	Middlesbrough (A)	2–0
4th	Southend United (A)	2–0
5th Replay	Brighton & Hove Albion (A); Brighton & Hove Albion (H)	1–1; 2–1
6th	Sunderland (H)	3–0
SF	Sheffield United (N)	5–3
Key: (H) = Home venue; (A) = Away venue; (N) = Neutral venue

Hull City also entered the 2013–14 FA Cup in the third round, where they were drawn away to Middlesbrough. In the 10th minute, Aaron McLean put Hull ahead when he struck David Meyler's deflected shot past Middlesbrough goalkeeper Dimitrios Konstantopoulos. Midway through the second half, Nick Proschwitz scored from inside the Middlesbrough penalty area to give Hull a 2–0 victory. In the fourth round, Hull's opposition were League Two side Southend United, whom they faced at Roots Hall. The first half ended 0–0 and midway through the second, Fryatt scored after receiving a pass from Meyler. Fryatt doubled his and his side's tally in stoppage time, beating Dan Bentley in the Southend goal with his strike and securing a 2–0 win for Hull.

In the next round, Hull were drawn against Championship team Brighton & Hove Albion away at Falmer Stadium. Striker Leonardo Ulloa gave Brighton a first-half lead, scoring in the 30th minute after receiving a pass from Will Buckley. With four minutes of the match remaining, Hull's Yannick Sagbo levelled the score when he struck Sone Aluko's cross through the legs of Peter Brezovan, the Brighton goalkeeper. The match ended 1–1 and a replay was then required at the KC Stadium in Hull to determine the winner of the tie. Curtis Davies gave Hull the lead after 14 minutes with a header that beat defender Jake Forster-Caskey on the goal line, before a deflected free kick from Robert Koren made it 2–0 before half-time. Ulloa halved the deficit with a header midway through the second half, but the match ended 2–1 to Hull.

Hull's opponents in the sixth round were Sunderland at home. After a goalless first half, Hull scored three times in the space of nine minutes to secure a 3–0 victory. Davies scored with a header in the 68th minute before Meyler dispossessed Lee Cattermole and made it 2–0 four minutes later. A further mistake from Cattermole allowed Fryatt to score from 12 yards (11 m) in the 77th minute. In the semi-final, Hull's first since 1930, they faced Sheffield United, also at Wembley. Jose Baxter gave Sheffield United the lead in the 19th minute before Sagbo equalised three minutes before half-time. Two minutes later, Stefan Scougall scored from Jamie Murphy's cross to make it 2–1 at half-time. Second-half goals from Fryatt, Tom Huddlestone and Stephen Quinn gave Hull a 4–2 lead before Murphy scored in the 90th minute to reduce Sheffield United's deficit. Three minutes into stoppage time, Meyler added Hull's fifth and ensured his side a 5–3 victory and progression to the final for the first time in their history.

== Match ==
=== Pre-match ===
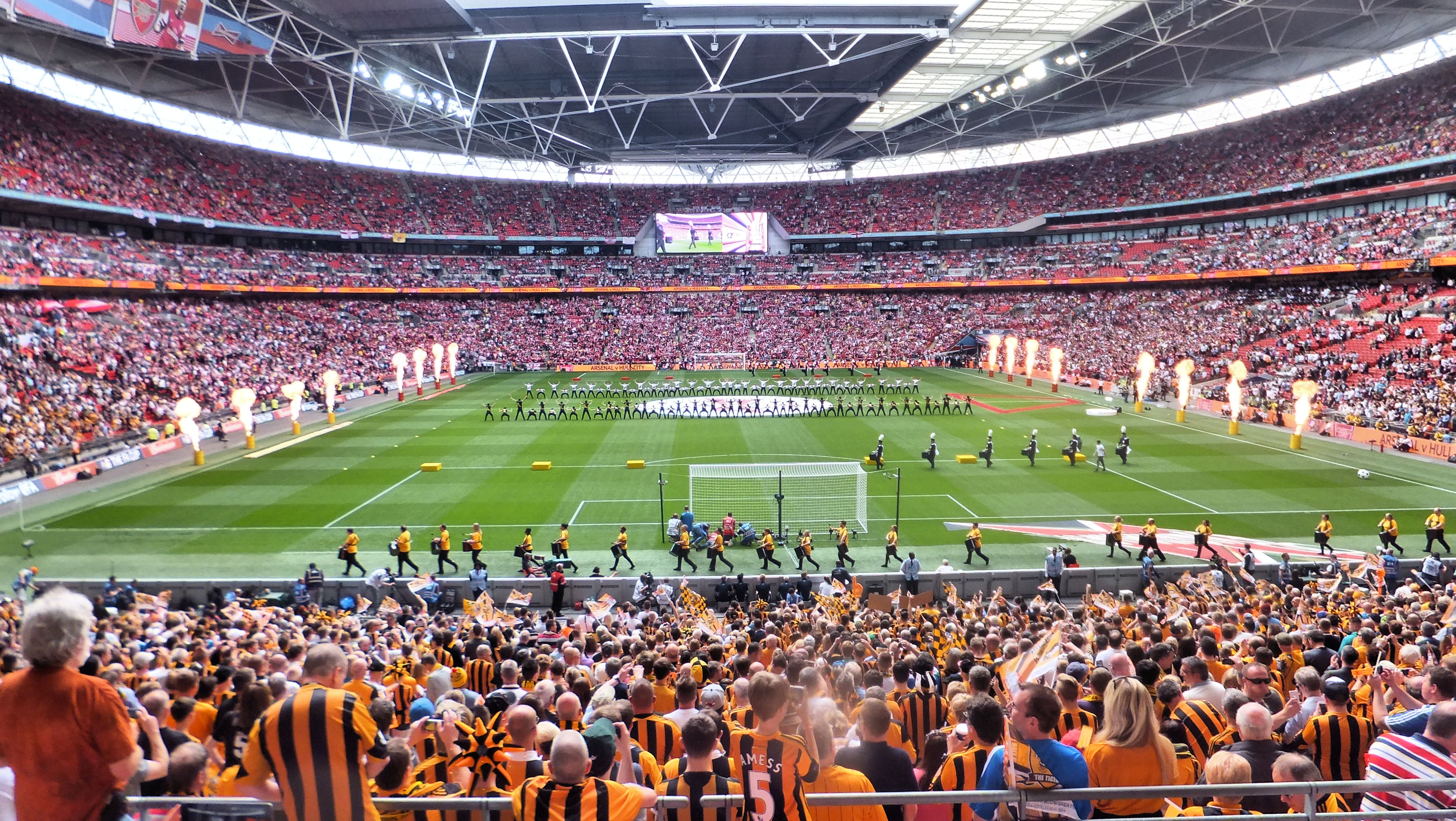
Musical and pyrotechnic performance before the match

The referee for the final was Lee Probert, who had previously officiated the 2010 FA Trophy Final and was the fourth official for the 2011 FA Cup Final. He was assisted by Jake Collin and Mick McDonough, while Kevin Friend was the fourth official and Simon Bennett was the reserve assistant referee. Arsenal wore their traditional red-and-white home kit for the final and used the home team dressing room, while their fans were allocated the west end of the stadium. Hull fans occupied the east end and the team played in their amber-and-black home strip. Ticket prices for the final started at £45 and were also available at £65, £85 and £115, with a £10 discount for concessions, as ticket prices remained the same as the previous FA Cup final. Both clubs were allocated 25,000 tickets, with approximately 20,000 tickets being distributed to volunteers "through the football family", which included counties, leagues, local clubs and charities. The financial prize for winning the FA Cup Final was £1.8 million.

The traditional pre-match anthem, "Abide with Me", and the national anthem were performed by the winner of the third series of The X Factor, Leona Lewis, accompanied by the Band of the Welsh Guards. Arsenal were without long-term injured attackers Walcott and Gnabry, while Oxlade-Chamberlain and captain Thomas Vermaelen faced late fitness tests. While Vermaelen made the bench, Oxlade-Chamberlain missed the final. Hull strikers Shane Long and Nikica Jelavić were cup-tied, having appeared earlier in the tournament for West Bromwich Albion and Everton respectively. Aluko, Paul McShane, James Chester and Robbie Brady faced fitness tests for Hull; only Chester was deemed fit enough to start the match, Aluko and McShane were on the bench, and Brady missed out altogether. Hull welcomed back goalkeeper Allan McGregor from a kidney injury. Arsenal adopted a 4–2–3–1 formation while Hull lined up as a 3–5–1–1.

=== Summary ===
==== First half ====
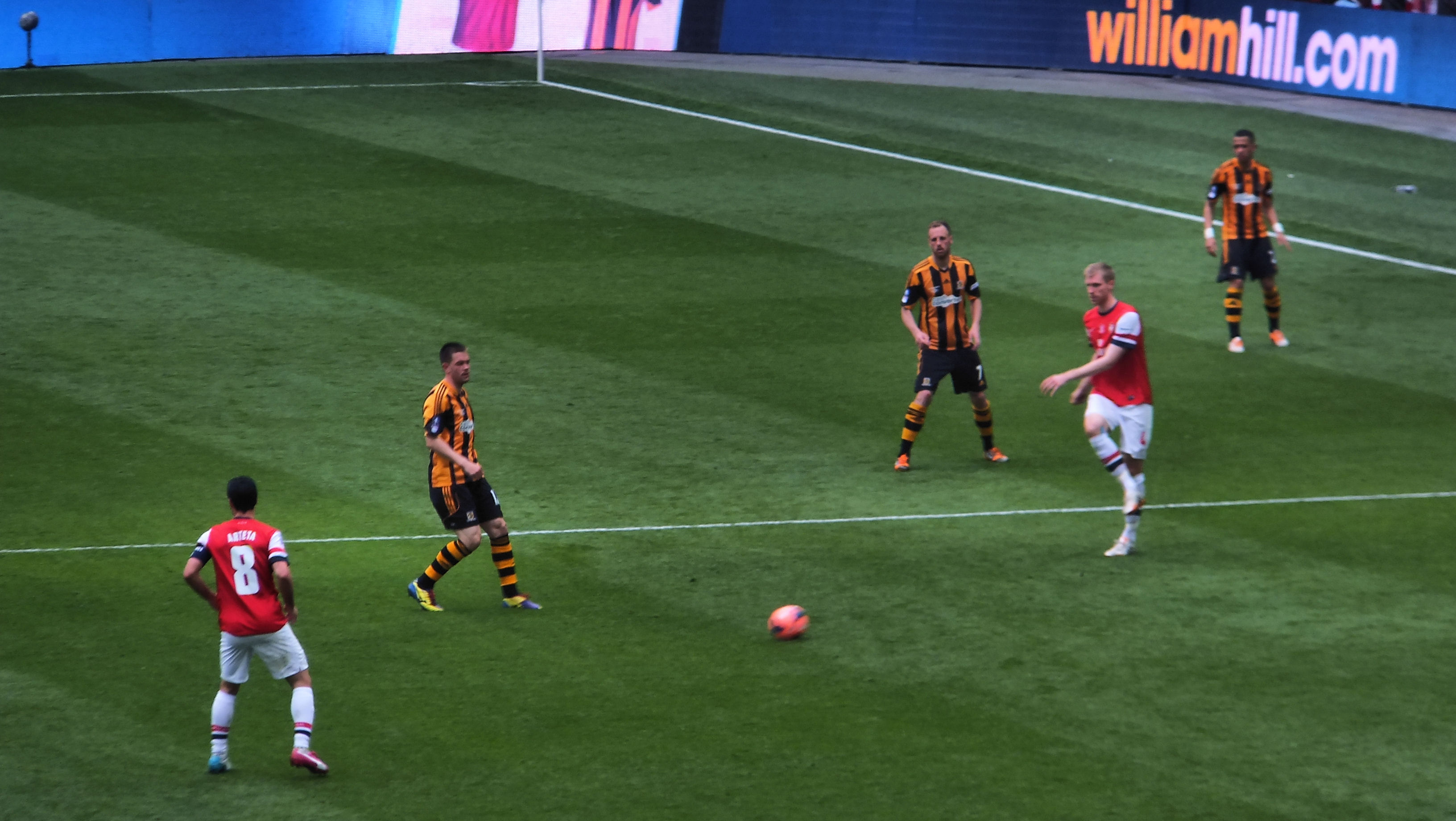
Arsenal enjoyed 65% of possession during the course of the match.

Hull City kicked off the match at around 5 p.m. on 17 May 2014 in front of 89,345 spectators. In the 4th minute, a corner from Quinn found Huddlestone on the edge of the Arsenal penalty area and his shot was diverted into the goal by Chester to give Hull a 1–0 lead. Three minutes later, Giroud received treatment for an injury before Davies doubled Hull's lead in the 9th minute. Huddlestone struck a free kick from the right-hand side of the pitch into Arsenal's penalty area that the defenders failed to clear. Alex Bruce headed the ball goalbound and Fabiański pushed it against the post before Davies struck it into the goal from close range to make it 2–0. In the 14th minute, Hull were close to scoring their third after Bruce's header from a set piece was cleared off the Arsenal goal line by Gibbs. Two minutes later, Cazorla was fouled by Bruce and won a free kick. From around 27 yards (25 m), Cazorla struck the ball past McGregor and into the Hull net to make it 2–1.

Midway through the half, Podolski crossed for Özil, whose run had beaten Bruce, but he missed the ball altogether from close range. In the 25th minute, Özil's shot from the edge of the Hull penalty area was headed clear by Davies. Arsenal increased the pressure and Giroud shot off-target in the 28th minute before Ramsey's strike from a corner was also cleared by Davies. With two minutes of the half remaining, Huddlestone's shot from around 30 yards (27 m) went narrowly over the Arsenal crossbar. After three minutes of stoppage time, the first half was brought to a close with Hull leading 2–1.

==== Second half ====
Neither side made any substitutions during the interval and Arsenal kicked off the second half. Five minutes in, Özil ran onto a chipped pass forward and sent in a cross, but none of his teammates were in the penalty area. In the 56th minute, the spectators applauded in memory of the 56 victims of the Bradford City stadium fire of 1985. Two minutes later, Giroud fell in the Hull penalty area under a challenge from Huddlestone, but the referee adjudged it to have been a legitimate tackle and did not award a penalty. In the 60th minute, Huddlestone became the first player of the match to be shown a yellow card for a foul. Soon after, Arsenal made their first change; Podolski was substituted for Sanogo and they altered their formation to play with two strikers. Sanogo missed a chance to score from a header in the 64th minute before Hull replaced Bruce with McShane.

In the 68th minute, Cazorla was brought down by Davies in the Hull penalty area, but the referee turned down the appeals for a penalty, before Meyler was booked for a foul on Laurent Koscielny. With 18 minutes of the match remaining, Arsenal equalised to make it 2–2. Sagna won a header from a corner and the ball deflected to Koscielny, who was 3 yards (3 m) from the goal line, where he turned and struck the ball into the net. Three minutes later, Hull made their second substitution, with Aluko coming on for Quinn. In the 79th minute, Arsenal's Gibbs struck a shot over the crossbar from close range. McGregor then saved a shot from Giroud before the Arsenal player was booked for a foul on Aluko. Davies was then shown a yellow card for a foul on Giroud. In the final minute of regular time, Sanogo struck a shot wide of the Hull goal from the edge of the penalty area. In the third of three minutes of stoppage time, Özil passed to Giroud, whose shot was saved by McGregor. The second half ended with the scores level at 2–2, sending the match into extra time.

==== Extra time ====
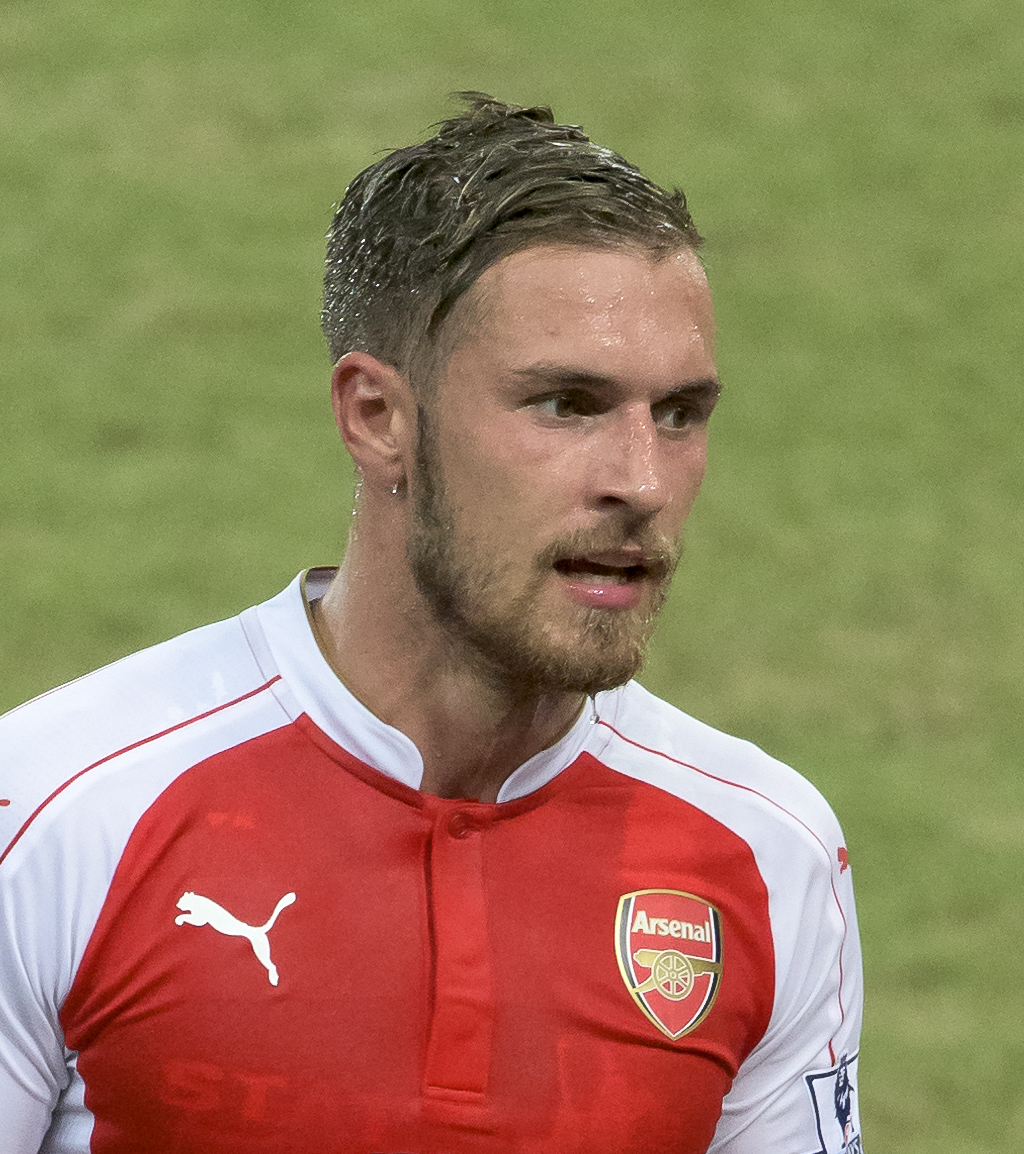
Aaron Ramsey (pictured in 2015) scored the winning goal in the second half of extra time.

Arsenal dominated the early stages of extra time and had a 93rd-minute shot from Özil blocked by Chester, before Giroud's header struck the Hull crossbar. Midway through the first period of additional time, Ramsey struck a shot from 30 yards (27 m) that was saved by McGregor. In the 99th minute, Ramsey hit the ball into the side netting after exchanging passes with Giroud. With three minutes of the first half remaining, Hull were forced to make their final substitution when Liam Rosenior was injured, and he was replaced by George Boyd. A minute before half-time, Cazorla's curling shot from around 13 yards (12 m) was off target and the first period of extra time ended with the score still level at 2–2.

Before the second half began, Arsenal made a double-substitution, with Rosický and Jack Wilshere replacing Özil and Cazorla. In the 109th minute, Giroud backheeled the ball to Ramsey, who struck it into the Hull goal from around 14 yards (13 m) to give Arsenal a 3–2 lead. With six minutes remaining, Sanogo's shot from 15 yards (14 m) was wide of the goal, before a mistake from Mertesacker allowed Aluko to go around Fabiański, but his shot was also wide. In the 118th minute, Giroud went down in the area, once again appealing for a penalty, but Sanogo continued to play and his shot was saved by McGregor. In the final minute, Fabiański saved a shot from Aluko, and the match ended 3–2, with Arsenal winning the FA Cup.

=== Details ===
17 May 2014
17:00 BST

Arsenal	3–2 (a.e.t.)	Hull City
Cazorla 17'; Koscielny 71'; Ramsey 109'	Report; Statistics	Chester 4'; Davies 8'

Wembley Stadium, London
Attendance: 89,345
Referee: Lee Probert (Wiltshire)

Arsenal	Hull City

GK	21	(Poland) Łukasz Fabiański
RB	3	(France) Bacary Sagna
CB	4	(Germany) Per Mertesacker
CB	6	(France) Laurent Koscielny
LB	28	(England) Kieran Gibbs
CM	16	(Wales) Aaron Ramsey
CM	8	(Spain) Mikel Arteta (c)
RW	19	(Spain) Santi Cazorla		(substituted off) 106'
AM	11	(Germany) Mesut Özil		(substituted off) 106'
LW	9	(Germany) Lukas Podolski		(substituted off) 61'
CF	12	(France) Olivier Giroud	(yellow card) 85'
Substitutes:
GK	1	(Poland) Wojciech Szczęsny
DF	5	(Belgium) Thomas Vermaelen
DF	17	(Spain) Nacho Monreal
MF	7	(Czech Republic) Tomáš Rosický		(substituted on) 106'
MF	10	(England) Jack Wilshere		(substituted on) 106'
MF	20	(France) Mathieu Flamini
FW	22	(France) Yaya Sanogo		(substituted on) 61'
Manager:
(France) Arsène Wenger

GK	1	(Scotland) Allan McGregor
RB	27	(Egypt) Ahmed Elmohamady
CB	5	(Wales) James Chester
CB	4	(Northern Ireland) Alex Bruce		(substituted off) 67'
CB	6	(England) Curtis Davies (c)	(yellow card) 86'
LB	2	(England) Liam Rosenior		(substituted off) 102'
DM	8	(England) Tom Huddlestone	(yellow card) 60'
CM	14	(England) Jake Livermore
CM	7	(Republic of Ireland) David Meyler	(yellow card) 70'
AM	29	(Republic of Ireland) Stephen Quinn		(substituted off) 75'
CF	12	(England) Matty Fryatt
Substitutes:
GK	22	(England) Steve Harper
DF	3	(Honduras) Maynor Figueroa
DF	15	(Republic of Ireland) Paul McShane		(substituted on) 67'
MF	10	(Slovenia) Robert Koren
MF	17	(Scotland) George Boyd		(substituted on) 102'
FW	20	(Ivory Coast) Yannick Sagbo
FW	24	(Nigeria) Sone Aluko		(substituted on) 75'
Manager:
(England) Steve Bruce

Man of the match

- Aaron Ramsey (Arsenal)

Match officials

- Assistant referees:
  - Jake Collin (Liverpool)
  - Mick McDonough (Northumberland)
- Fourth official: Kevin Friend (Leicestershire)
- Reserve official: Simon Bennett (Staffordshire)

Statistics
	Arsenal	Hull City
Total shots	26	12
Shots on target	7	4
Ball possession	65%	35%
Corner kicks	7	3
Fouls	17	18
Offsides	4	0
Yellow cards	1	3
Red cards	0	0

== Post-match ==
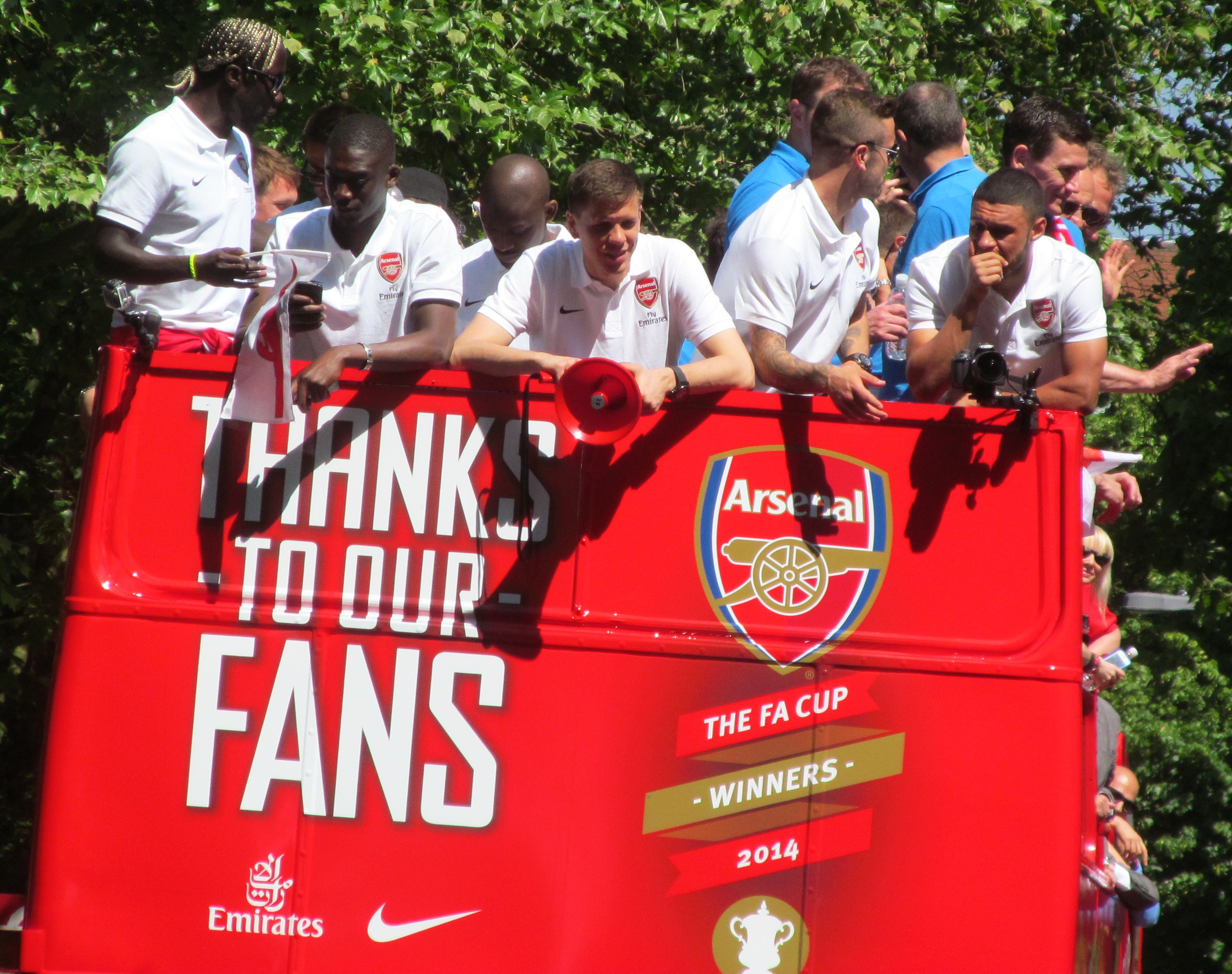
Arsenal players during the open top bus parade

Arsène Wenger, the Arsenal manager, said: "We wanted to make history ... We made history in both ways: how not to start a final and how to come back. I think this is a turning point in the lives of the players". His counterpart Steve Bruce was disappointed, but said: "In terms of effort, endeavour and determination you couldn't fault them to a man. Proud? Of course I am. They were magnificent." He suggested that mistakes had been made by the referee in the build-up to the first two Arsenal goals, saying: "I didn't think the first one was a free-kick and the second goal was a goal-kick not a corner. But it's not the time now to whinge. We are totally disappointed because it could have been one of those memorable FA Cup wins where the underdog goes and wins it."

A new version of the FA Cup trophy was cast to be presented, for the first time, to the winners of the 2014 final. Standing 61.5 centimetres (24.2 in) high and weighing 6.3 kilograms (13 lb 14 oz), it was heavier than the previous two versions of the cup, having been made of sterling silver. Commissioned in 2013, it replaced a cup first presented to Liverpool in the 1992 FA Cup Final. The base of the old trophy, which featured the names of past winners, was retained. As winners, Arsenal paraded the trophy from an open top bus on 18 May, following a route from the Emirates Stadium to Islington Town Hall on Upper Street in north London.

Arsenal's victory meant they drew level with Manchester United's 11 FA Cup titles, having previously won in 1930, 1936, 1950, 1971, 1979, 1993, 1998, 2002, 2003 and 2005. As Arsenal qualified for the 2014–15 UEFA Champions League via their league position, Hull entered the 2014–15 UEFA Europa League in the third qualifying round. Due to a change in UEFA rules, this was the last season the FA Cup runners-up would enter the Europa League if the winners had already qualified for European competition. Two weeks after the final, Arsenal Ladies won the FA Women's Cup by beating Everton Ladies, giving the club a rare FA Cup double.

== Broadcasting ==
The match was broadcast live in the United Kingdom by both ITV and BT Sport. ITV provided the free-to-air coverage and BT Sport 1 was the pay-TV alternative. ITV held the majority of the viewership – a peak audience of 10.1 million viewers (52.1% viewing share) watched at 7:30 p.m. The ratings were up on the previous year's final, which peaked at 9.4 million (42% share). BT Sport's coverage averaged 250,000 viewers (1.8% share). Coverage of the final began on ITV at 3 p.m. and averaged 5.4 million (50% share).
