= Alex Bruce (footballer, born 1984) =

English footballer (born 1984)

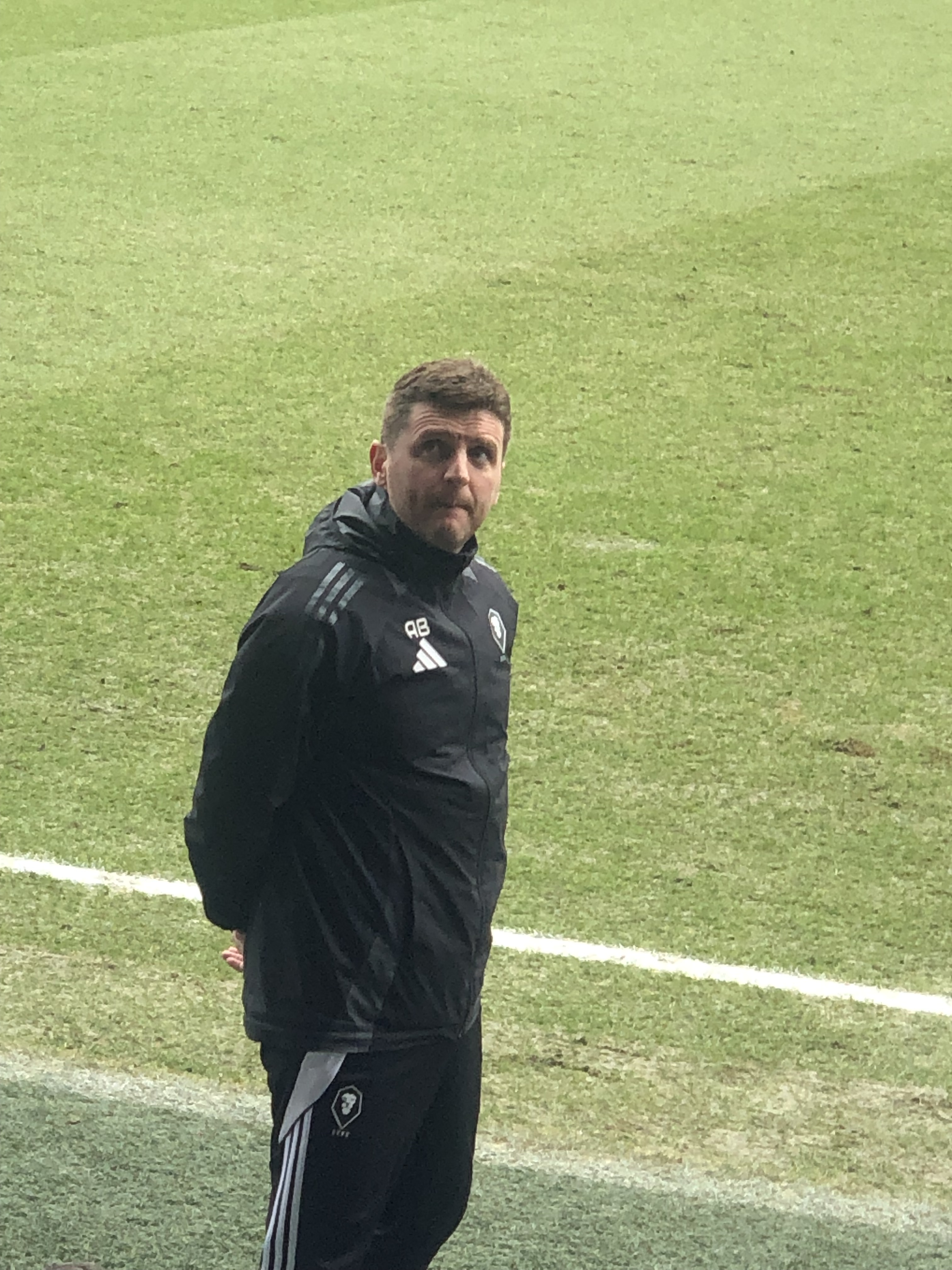
- Bruce in 2025

Personal information
- Full name: Alex Stephen Bruce
- Date of birth: 28 September 1984 (age 42)
- Place of birth: Norwich, England
- Height: 5 ft 11 in (1.80 m)
- Position: Defender

Team information
- Current team: Rotherham United (head coach)

Youth career
- 1998–2001: Manchester United
- 2001–2004: Blackburn Rovers

Senior career*
Years	Team	Apps	(Gls)
2004–2005	Blackburn Rovers	0	(0)
2004–2005	→ Oldham Athletic (loan)	6	(0)
2005–2006	Birmingham City	6	(0)
2005	→ Oldham Athletic (loan)	6	(0)
2005	→ Sheffield Wednesday (loan)	6	(0)
2005	→ Tranmere Rovers (loan)	11	(0)
2006–2010	Ipswich Town	115	(2)
2010	→ Leicester City (loan)	3	(0)
2010–2012	Leeds United	29	(1)
2011	→ Huddersfield Town (loan)	3	(0)
2012–2017	Hull City	85	(1)
2017	→ Wigan Athletic (loan)	2	(0)
2017	Bury	2	(1)
2017–2019	Wigan Athletic	6	(1)
2019–2020	Kilmarnock	20	(1)
2021–2022	Macclesfield	5	(0)
Total		305	(7)

International career
2006	Republic of Ireland U21	5	(0)
2006	Republic of Ireland B	1	(0)
2007–2008	Republic of Ireland	2	(0)
2013–2014	Northern Ireland	2	(0)

Managerial career
- 2023–2024: Macclesfield
- 2026–: Rotherham United
- * Club domestic league appearances and goals

Alex Stephen Bruce (born 28 September 1984) is a professional football coach and former player who is head coach of EFL League Two club Rotherham United.

The son of the former Manchester United defender Steve Bruce, he played as a defender or defensive midfielder for Oldham Athletic, Sheffield Wednesday, Tranmere Rovers, Ipswich Town, Leicester City, Leeds United, Huddersfield Town, Hull City, Wigan Athletic, Bury, Kilmarnock and Macclesfield.

Born and raised in England, Bruce has played twice for the Northern Ireland national team, for which he declared himself available in 2011 and made his debut in 2013. He had previously made two appearances for the Republic of Ireland, but was allowed to switch under FIFA eligibility rules as these had been in friendly matches.

== Club career ==
=== Blackburn Rovers ===
Bruce was born in Norwich, Norfolk, but moved to the Greater Manchester area at the age of three when his father, centre-back Steve Bruce, was transferred from Norwich City to Manchester United. He joined the Manchester United Academy, but was released at age 16 and moved to Blackburn Rovers as a trainee. He signed his first professional contract there in 2002, and was part of their under-19 team that won the FA Premier Academy League in 2002–03. He made his first-team debut on 26 December 2004 against Hartlepool United, while on three months' loan to League One club Oldham Athletic, and was part of the Oldham team that beat Manchester City in the FA Cup on 8 January 2005.

=== Birmingham City ===
He signed on a free transfer for Birmingham City, where his father was manager, on 27 January 2005.

After finishing another loan spell at Oldham and returning to his parent club, he joined Sheffield Wednesday again on loan until the season's end, and contributed to their promotion via the play-offs. Bruce's performances against Tranmere Rovers impressed that club's manager, Brian Little, who signed him on loan for the first half of the 2005–06 season, but the loan was terminated early by mutual consent.

Bruce made a few Premier League appearances for Birmingham following his return, including coming on as a substitute against Liverpool when Birmingham were getting heavily beaten. The team were relegated to the Championship, and it was felt that accusations of nepotism were hindering his progress, so it was decided that, in the best interests of club, manager and player, Bruce should pursue his career away from his father's management.

=== Ipswich Town ===
In the summer of 2006, he moved to Ipswich Town on a free transfer, signing a three-year contract. In early summer 2007 he was called up as an international player by the Republic of Ireland, and in November 2008, he was reportedly being watched by Italian club Fiorentina, having been recommended by Ireland manager Giovanni Trapattoni. Bruce scored his first goal for Ipswich, away to his former club Birmingham City, on 24 October 2008. He ended speculation he would leave the club by signing a new two-year contract in May 2009. Bruce captained the side at the start of the 2009–10 season, initially because Gareth McAuley was absent through injury and loss of form, but manager Roy Keane confirmed in late August that Bruce would keep the captaincy even if McAuley returned to the team. He fell out of favour with Keane, and lost his place in the starting 11.

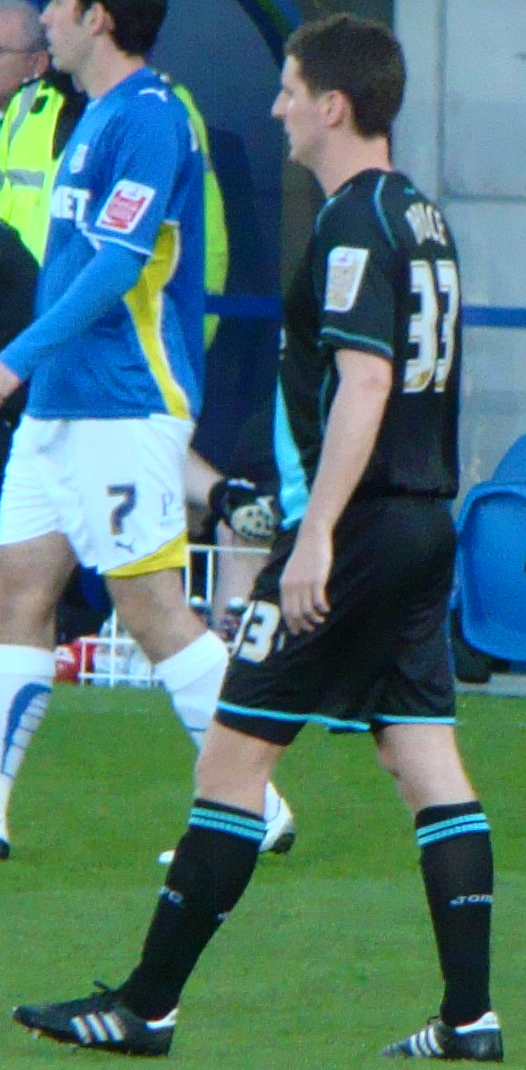
Bruce playing for Leicester City in 2010

On 1 February 2010, Bruce joined Leicester City on loan for the rest of the season; he jumped at the opportunity "for a change and a new challenge." He made his debut as a substitute during injury time in a 2–1 win over Blackpool at Bloomfield Road on 7 February, playing for less than a minute. Half an hour into his full debut, he suffered a hernia that required surgery, and kept him out for several weeks. He recovered in time to play in the last three matches of the season, partnering Jack Hobbs in central defence as Leicester lost the Championship play-off semi-final to Cardiff City on penalties.

=== Leeds United ===
In July 2010, a transfer to Sheffield United was discussed but not completed; press speculation suggested the clubs had failed to agree on how the £200,000 fee should be paid. On 30 July, Bruce joined Championship club Leeds United for an undisclosed fee. He signed a two-year deal with an option for a further year. Bruce was an unused substitute in Leeds' first game of the season, and made his debut in the League Cup against Lincoln City on 10 August, coming into the starting 11 in place of captain Richard Naylor; Naylor took his place back for the next League match. Bruce made his second start in the next round of the League Cup, against his former club Leicester City.

In his first League appearance, again replacing the rested Naylor, this time against Doncaster Rovers on 17 September, Bruce helped Leeds keep a clean sheet. He kept his place for the next game, against Sheffield United, and scored his first Leeds goal in the next, a 6–4 home defeat against Preston North End. After Naylor came back into the side, Bruce moved to right back against his former club Ipswich Town, and was sent off after receiving a second yellow card for a foul on Andros Townsend. After a spell on the bench, Bruce returned to Leeds' starting line-up against Cardiff City. After cementing his place in the side in partnership with Andy O'Brien, Bruce picked up an injury against Queens Park Rangers and had to be substituted early in the first half. In January 2011, Bruce was part of the Leeds team that came close to eliminating Premier League Arsenal from the FA Cup. Leeds took the lead through a Robert Snodgrass penalty, but Cesc Fàbregas equalised in the 90th minute, also via a penalty. After Leeds conceded eight goals in the last three games in February, Leigh Bromby replaced Bruce in the defence, and Bruce made no further appearances that season.

The return to fitness of Patrick Kisnorbo provided additional competition in defence. Bruce scored in a pre-season victory against Motherwell, and played in a reserve-team friendly against non-league club Farsley Celtic, but missed the first few months of the season through injury, including damage to an ankle.

On 24 November, he joined League One club Huddersfield Town on loan until 2 January 2012. He made his debut in Town's 1–0 home defeat to AFC Bournemouth on 10 December, and played twice more before Leeds invoked a 24-hour recall clause after an injury to Tom Lees. He returned to Leeds' starting lineup for the first time in nearly a year for the 2–1 win against Burnley on 2 January, but that was his only appearance in January, and he was linked with a move to Los Angeles Galaxy. No move took place, and Bruce made seven more appearances before being released by manager Neil Warnock when his contract expired at the end of the season.

=== Hull City ===
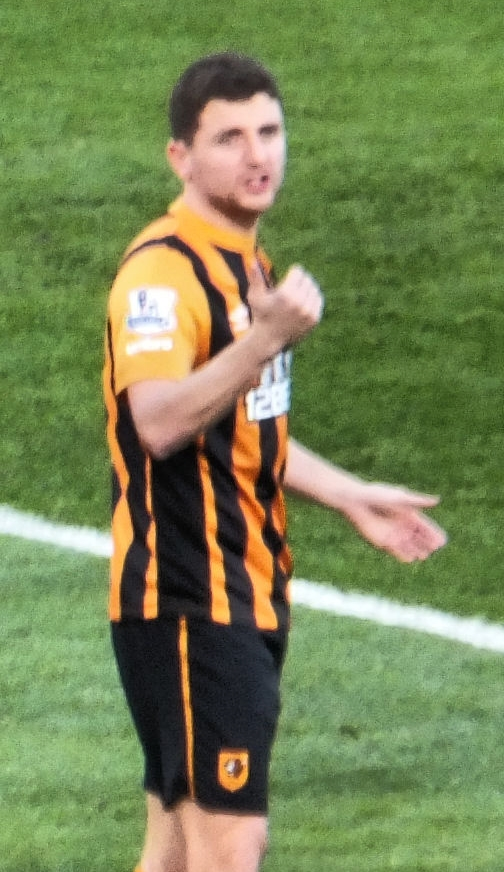
Bruce playing for Hull City in 2014.

Bruce signed a two-year deal with Championship club Hull City, where his father was manager, on 30 July 2012. He played 32 games and became an integral part of the team that earned promotion to the Premier League as Championship runners-up during the 2012–13 season. In his second season at the club, Bruce played 20 Premier League matches.

On 17 May 2014 he started the 2014 FA Cup final against Arsenal, but was on the losing side after Aaron Ramsey scored in extra time to give Arsenal a 3–2 victory.

On 20 October 2015 he scored his first goal for Hull City with a 36th-minute header, after coming on for the injured Curtis Davies in the 18th minute of a 3–0 win against his former club, Ipswich Town.

On 31 January 2017, he moved on loan to Wigan Athletic until the end of the season.

=== Bury ===
In August 2017, Bruce joined League One club Bury on non-contract terms. Just 15 minutes into his debut, on 13 August away to Wigan Athletic, he scored with a header to tie the scores at 1–1; he played 75 minutes, and his team lost 4–1. Bruce left Bury on 30 August 2017 by mutual consent.

=== Wigan Athletic ===
The following day, he rejoined Wigan Athletic until the end of the season. Bruce went on to make ten appearances for Wigan in all competitions, scoring his seventh career goal in a 3–1 victory against Rotherham United.

Wigan entered into contract talks with him at the end of the 2017–18 season.

=== Kilmarnock ===
On 30 January 2019, Bruce signed for Kilmarnock until the end of the 2018–19 season after Wigan agreed to terminate his contract. On 17 July 2019, he signed a new one-year contract with the club. Bruce left Kilmarnock on 31 January 2020.

On 23 November 2020, Bruce announced his retirement from football.

=== Macclesfield ===
On 12 August 2021 Bruce came out of retirement and registered as a player for Macclesfield, his debut came on 17 August making a substitute appearance against Prestwich Heys in the North West Counties Football League Premier Division.

== International career ==
Qualifying through his paternal grandmother from Bangor, County Down, Northern Ireland, Bruce was eligible for international football for both Northern Ireland and the Republic of Ireland in addition to England, where he was born and brought up. He was called up by the Northern Ireland under-21s, but opted to play for the Republic instead, and made his debut for their under-21 team against Sweden in February 2006. He also represented Republic of Ireland B against Scotland B in November 2006.

On 23 May 2007 he made his full international debut in a friendly match for the Republic of Ireland against Ecuador played at Giants Stadium, New Jersey. He captained the Republic of Ireland B team which played Nottingham Forest in a challenge match at Dalymount Park on 9 October 2008.

In July 2011, Bruce switched his international allegiance to Northern Ireland. This was possible under FIFA eligibility rules because Bruce's appearances for the Republic had been in friendly matches. He was first called into the Northern Ireland squad in October 2012, for the World Cup qualifier against Portugal, but injury forced his withdrawal. He made his Northern Ireland debut against Malta in a friendly on 6 February 2013, becoming the only player to make senior appearances for both FA of Ireland and Irish FA sides since a FIFA intervention to prevent switches between the two associations in 1950.

== Coaching career ==
When his father was appointed manager of EFL Championship club West Bromwich Albion in February 2022, Bruce came in as a member of his coaching staff. Steve Bruce was sacked eight months later, and his staff left with him.

On 30 October 2023, Bruce returned to former club Macclesfield as manager. On 21 February 2024, the club confirmed that Bruce had left his role as manager in order to take up a role with a club in the Football League. Later that day, he was announced as first-team coach of League Two club Salford City.

On 29 June 2026, Bruce was appointed head coach of League Two club Rotherham United.

== Personal life ==
When Bruce joined Leeds United, he was reunited with his childhood friend, goalkeeper Kasper Schmeichel; their fathers, Steve Bruce and Peter Schmeichel, had played together at Manchester United between 1991 and 1996.

In December 2010, Bruce was involved in a car crash during a snow storm, but managed to escape from the crash unharmed.

Bruce married his partner Lucy in 2015.

== Career statistics ==
=== Club ===
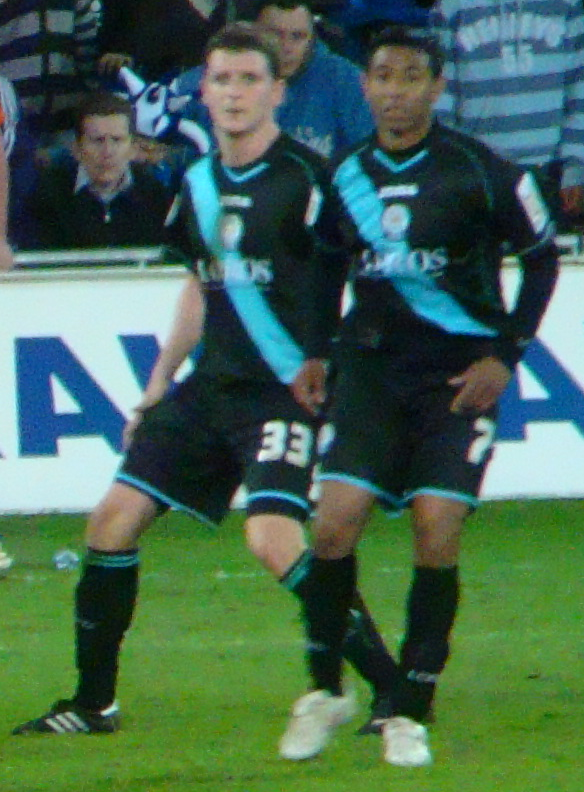
Bruce (left) and Nolberto Solano playing for Leicester City in 2010

Appearances and goals by club, season and competition
Club	Season	League			National cup (Note: Includes FA Cup, Scottish Cup)		League cup (Note: Includes Football League Cup/EFL Cup, Scottish League Cup)		Other		Total	
Club	Season	Division	Apps	Goals	Apps	Goals	Apps	Goals	Apps	Goals	Apps	Goals
Blackburn Rovers	2004–05	Premier League	0	0	—		0	0	—		0	0
Oldham Athletic (loan)	2004–05	League One	6	0	1	0	—		1 (Note: Appearance(s) in Football League Trophy)	0	8	0
Birmingham City	2004–05	Premier League	0	0	—		0	0	—		0	0
Birmingham City	2005–06	Premier League	6	0	6	0	—		—		12	0
Birmingham City	Total		6	0	6	0	0	0	—		12	0
Oldham Athletic (loan)	2004–05	League One	6	0	1	0	—		1	0	8	0
Sheffield Wednesday (loan)	2004–05	League One	6	0	—		—		3 (Note: Appearance(s) in Football League play-offs)	0	9	0
Tranmere Rovers (loan)	2005–06	League One	11	0	—		1	0	—		12	0
Ipswich Town	2006–07	Championship	41	0	3	0	1	0	—		45	0
Ipswich Town	2007–08	Championship	36	0	1	0	1	0	—		38	0
Ipswich Town	2008–09	Championship	25	1	2	1	2	0	—		29	2
Ipswich Town	2009–10	Championship	13	1	0	0	2	0	—		15	1
Ipswich Town	Total		115	2	6	1	6	0	—		127	3
Leicester City (loan)	2009–10	Championship	3	0	—		—		2	0	5	0
Leeds United	2010–11	Championship	21	1	2	0	2	0	—		25	1
Leeds United	2011–12	Championship	8	0	0	0	0	0	—		8	0
Leeds United	Total		29	1	2	0	2	0	—		33	1
Huddersfield Town (loan)	2011–12	League One	3	0	—		—		—		3	0
Hull City	2012–13	Championship	32	0	3	0	2	0	—		37	0
Hull City	2013–14	Premier League	20	0	2	0	3	0	—		25	0
Hull City	2014–15	Premier League	22	0	0	0	1	0	2 (Note: Appearance(s) in UEFA Europa League)	0	25	0
Hull City	2015–16	Championship	11	1	3	0	2	0	1	0	17	1
Hull City	2016–17	Premier League	0	0	0	0	0	0	—		0	0
Hull City	Total		85	1	8	0	8	0	3	0	104	1
Wigan Athletic (loan)	2016–17	Championship	2	0	—		—		—		2	0
Bury	2017–18	League One	2	1	0	0	—		0	0	2	1
Wigan Athletic	2017–18	League One	6	1	3	0	—		1	0	10	1
Wigan Athletic	2018–19	Championship	0	0	0	0	1	0	—		1	0
Wigan Athletic	Total		6	1	3	0	1	0	1	0	11	1
Kilmarnock	2018–19	Scottish Premiership	4	0	1	0	—		0	0	5	0
Kilmarnock	2019–20	Scottish Premiership	16	1	1	1	0	0	0	0	17	2
Kilmarnock	Total		20	1	2	1	0	0	0	0	22	2
Macclesfield	2021–22	North West Counties League; Premier Division	5	0	0	0	—		1 (Note: Appearance in Cheshire Senior Cup)	0	6	0
Career total			305	7	29	2	18	0	12	0	364	9

=== International ===
As of match played 5 March 2014

International statistics
National team	Year	Apps	Goals
Republic of Ireland	2007	1	0
Republic of Ireland	2008	1	0
Total		2	0
Northern Ireland	2013	1	0
Northern Ireland	2014	1	0
Total		2	0

== Managerial statistics ==
As of match played 21 November 2026

Managerial record by team and tenure
Team	From	To	Record				
Team	From	To	P	W	D	L	Win %
Macclesfield	1 November 2023	21 February 2024	22	15	3	4	68.18
Rotherham United	29 June 2026	Present	20	3	8	9	15.00
Total			42	18	11	13	42.86

== Honours ==
Sheffield Wednesday

- Football League One play-offs: 2005

Hull City

- Football League Championship runner-up: 2012–13
- FA Cup runner-up: 2013–14
- Football League Championship play-offs: 2016

Macclesfield

- North West Counties Football League Premier Division: 2021–22

== See also ==
- List of Republic of Ireland international footballers born outside the Republic of Ireland
