= Dougie Wilson =

Northern Irish footballer (born 1994)

Personal information
- Full name: Douglas Wilson
- Date of birth: 3 March 1994 (age 32)
- Place of birth: Markethill, Northern Ireland
- Height: 1.75 m (5 ft 9 in)
- Position: Midfielder

Team information
- Current team: Loughgall
- Number: 5

Youth career
- 2011–2012: Hull City

Senior career*
| Years | Team | Apps | (Gls) |
| 2012–2014 | Hull City | 0 | (0) |
| 2013 | → Grimsby Town (loan) | 3 | (0) |
| 2014–2021 | Dungannon Swifts | 181 | (19) |
| 2021–2023 | Ballymena United | 35 | (1) |
| 2023–2025 | Portadown | 30 | (4) |
| 2025– | Loughgall | 31 | (2) |

International career
| 2011 | Northern Ireland U17 | | |
| 2012 | Northern Ireland U19 | | |
| 2012–2013 | Northern Ireland U21 | | |
- * Club domestic league appearances and goals as of 17:55, 29 April 2026 (UTC)

Douglas Wilson (born 3 March 1994) is a Northern Irish footballer who plays as a midfielder for Loughgall in the NIFL Championship.

Wilson began his professional career in England when he was scouted by Hull City, however his full debut came whilst on loan at Grimsby Town in 2013. He has since returned home and has forged a career with both Dungannon Swifts and Ballymena United. He is a former Northern Ireland U21 international.

== Career ==
Wilson's talents were spotted by Hull City youth scouts when he was playing as a youngster in Northern Ireland and he was soon brought over to England to join the Tigers' youth set-up.

A central midfielder, Wilson made a big impression for City's youth team and captained the side on a number of occasions as they won the Youth Alliance North East Conference title in 2012.

His performances earned the Northern Ireland under-17 and under-19 international a step-up to the club's Development Squad for 2012–13 and having impressed at the reserve team level, he made his first team debut as a second-half substitute in an FA Cup tie against Leyton Orient in January 2013. On 8 March 2013 Wilson joined Grimsby Town on loan for the remainder of the 2012–13 season.

Wilson moved from Portadown to Loughgall at the end of the 2024–25 season.

== Career statistics ==
As of 9 April 2013.

| Club | Season | League | | FA Cup | | League Cup | | Other | | Total | |
| Club | Season | Apps | Goals | Apps | Goals | Apps | Goals | Apps | Goals | Apps | Goals |
|---|---|---|---|---|---|---|---|---|---|---|---|
| Hull City | 2012–13 | 0 | 0 | 1 | 0 | 0 | 0 | 0 | 0 | 1 | 0 |
| Grimsby Town (loan) | 2012–13 | 3 | 0 | 0 | 0 | 0 | 0 | 0 | 0 | 3 | 0 |
| Career total | | 3 | 0 | 1 | 0 | 0 | 0 | 0 | 0 | 4 | 0 |
