= 2014–15 Hull City A.F.C. season =

English football club season

Hull City
2014–15 season
- Chairman: Assem Allam
- Manager: Steve Bruce
- Stadium: KC Stadium
- Premier League: 18th (relegated)
- FA Cup: Third round
- League Cup: Third round
- UEFA Europa League: Play–off round
- Top goalscorer: League: Nikica Jelavić (8); All: Nikica Jelavić (8)
- Highest home attendance: 24,877 (29 May v Burnley)
- Lowest home attendance: 21,275 (15 September vs West Ham United)
- Average home league attendance: 23,557
Home colours	Away colours	Third colours

The 2014–15 season was Hull City's second season back in the Premier League after retaining their league status with their highest points total and highest finishing position of 16th in the 2013–14 season. They also competed in the League Cup and the FA Cup. As losing FA Cup finalists in the 2013–14 season they also took part in the UEFA Europa League and started in the Third qualifying round.

== Events ==
- The season's fixtures were announced on 18 June 2014, giving City an opening away tie against Queens Park Rangers on 16 August 2014. The season closes on 24 May 2015 with a home match against Manchester United.
- On 20 June 2014, the club unveiled a new crest which did not include the name of the team.
- On 25 June 2014, Jake Livermore was signed from Tottenham Hotspur for an undisclosed club record fee on a three-year contract. The BBC reported the fee was thought to be about £8 million.
- On 30 June 2014, Robert Snodgrass was signed from Norwich City for an undisclosed fee, believed to be in excess of £6 million, on a three-year contract.
- On 7 July 2014 Tom Ince was signed from Blackpool on a two-year contract. The free transfer was made with compensation to Blackpool still to be agreed.
- On 7 July 2014 Joe Dudgeon signed a new one-year contract with the club.
- On 9 July 2014, goalkeeper Eldin Jakupović signed a new two-year contract with the club.
- On 28 July 2014, Hibernian signed Mark Oxley on a six-month loan, with a view to extending to the end of the season. This was extended to a season long loan on 8 January 2015.
- On 29 July 2014, the club made a double signing on three-year deals of Harry Maguire, for £2.5 million from Sheffield United, and Andy Robertson, for £2.85 million from Dundee United. On the same day, Conor Townsend moved to Dundee United on a season-long loan, but returned early on 3 February 2015.
- On 31 July 2014, Joe Dudgeon signed a month-long loan agreement with Barnsley, this was later extended to 5 January 2015.
- On 14 August 2014, Shane Long signed for Southampton for an undisclosed fee, reported by the BBC to be about £12 million.
- On 20 August 2014, manager Steve Bruce confirmed that Robert Snodgrass would be out for six months due to a knee injury sustained at Queens Park Rangers on 16 August.
- On 26 August 2014, Michael Dawson joined from Tottenham Hotspur for £3.5 million on a three-year deal.
- On transfer deadline day, 1 September 2014, defender Brian Lenihan was signed on a three-year deal from Cork City, for an undisclosed fee. George Boyd moved to Burnley on a three-year contract. Abel Hernández of Palermo signed a three-year deal for a club record transfer fee, reported by the BBC to be about £10 million. Mohamed Diamé moved from West Ham United after signing a three-year deal with the club. Gastón Ramírez was brought in from Southampton and Hatem Ben Arfa from Newcastle United, both on season-long loan deals.
- On 9 September 2014, a press conference was called by owner Assem Allam for 2:00 p.m. on 11 September to discuss "the future of Hull City Tigers". At the press conference, Allam confirmed that following The FA's rejection of the name change on 9 April 2014, he had put the club up for sale and would be appealing to the Court of Arbitration for Sport (CAS) over the name change. On 16 March 2015, an independent panel ruled that the original decision by The FA "cannot stand" and the club were free to reapply for a name change for next season.
- On 30 September 2014, Yannick Sagbo went on an emergency three-month loan to Wolverhampton Wanderers, but was recalled early on 13 November 2014.
- On 21 October 2014, Maynor Figueroa returned to Wigan Athletic on a month-loan; this was later extended to 30 December 2014. He was recalled early on 22 December 2014 to cover for injuries.
- On 30 October 2014, Tom Ince went on loan to Nottingham Forest until 28 December 2014, but was recalled early on 22 December 2014 to cover for injuries.
- On 7 November 2014, Brian Lenihan went out on a month-long loan spell to Blackpool, but this was cut short on 25 November 2014 with a tendon injury.
- On 20 November 2014, Will Aimson and Calaum Jahraldo-Martin went on loan to Tranmere Rovers until 1 January 2015. Though Aimson returned after the match on 28 November 2014 where he suffered a broken tibia and fibula.
- On 21 November 2014, the club announced that Burgess Hill Town striker Greg Luer would be joining on 1 January 2015.
- On 5 December 2014, UEFA announced that the club was under investigation for possible breaches of the UEFA Financial Fair Play Regulations. In February 2015, the club were fined £145,000 for breaching the rules.
- On 23 December 2014, Steve Agnew left the club to become assistant head coach of Middlesbrough.
- On 5 January 2015, Hatem Ben Arfa signed for French side Nice after being out of favour and leaving without telling the club his whereabouts.
- On 23 January 2015, Karim Rossi moved on a free transfer to Belgian side Zulte Waregem.
- On 27 January 2015, Calaum Jahraldo-Martin signed for Scottish Championship club Alloa Athletic on loan until the end of the 2014–15 season.
- On 30 January 2015, it was announced that Dean Windass would become the club ambassador on 2 February, the first official appointment to this role.
- On transfer deadline day, 2 February 2015, Tom Ince moved on loan to Derby County for the remainder of the season and Greg Luer moved on a month-long loan to Port Vale. They also signed Senegal striker Dame N'Doye from Lokomotiv Moscow for an undisclosed fee on a two-and-a-half-year contract.
- On 5 February 2015 Mike Phelan was appointed as assistant manager.
- On 10 February 2015, Harry Maguire went on a month-long loan to Wigan Athletic, this was later extended until the end of the season.
- On 28 February 2015, Conor Townsend went on a month-long loan to Scunthorpe United, which was later extended to the end of the season.
- On 11 March 2015, the club confirmed that a new contract had been agreed with manager Steve Bruce, a three-year deal that was signed later.
- On 13 March 2015, Johnny Margetts went on loan to Cambridge United for the rest of the season.
- On 19 March 2015, it was reported that Nikica Jelavić would be out for six-weeks after knee surgery.
- On 15 May 2015, Jake Livermore was suspended by the club following a positive test for cocaine, and would not play again in the 2014–15 season.
- On 28 May 2015, the club released six players, Joe Dudgeon, Maynor Figueroa, Steve Harper, Paul McShane, Liam Rosenior and Yannick Sagbo, who were all out of contract at the end of the season.
- On 19 June 2015, Conor Townsend signed a one-year contract extension.

=== Awards ===
The awards ceremony for the season was originally planned for 24 May 2015, but this was postponed to a date in July 2015.

== Players ==
As of 30 March 2015.

=== First team squad ===
Note: Flags indicate national team as defined under FIFA eligibility rules; some limited exceptions apply. Players may hold more than one non-FIFA nationality.

No.	Pos.	Nation	Player
1	GK	SCO	Allan McGregor
2	DF	ENG	Liam Rosenior
3	DF	HON	Maynor Figueroa
4	DF	NIR	Alex Bruce
5	DF	WAL	James Chester
6	DF	ENG	Curtis Davies (captain)
7	MF	IRL	David Meyler
8	MF	ENG	Tom Huddlestone
9	FW	URU	Abel Hernández
10	MF	SCO	Robert Snodgrass
11	MF	IRL	Robbie Brady
14	MF	ENG	Jake Livermore
15	DF	IRL	Paul McShane
16	GK	SUI	Eldin Jakupović

No.	Pos.	Nation	Player
17	MF	SEN	Mohamed Diamé
18	FW	CRO	Nikica Jelavić
19	DF	NIR	Joe Dudgeon
20	FW	CIV	Yannick Sagbo
21	DF	ENG	Michael Dawson
22	GK	ENG	Steve Harper
24	FW	NGA	Sone Aluko
25	MF	URU	Gastón Ramírez (On loan from Southampton)
26	DF	SCO	Andrew Robertson
27	MF	EGY	Ahmed Elmohamady
28	FW	SEN	Dame N'Doye
29	MF	IRL	Stephen Quinn
31	DF	IRL	Brian Lenihan
—	DF	ENG	Will Aimson

==== Out on loan ====
Note: Flags indicate national team as defined under FIFA eligibility rules; some limited exceptions apply. Players may hold more than one non-FIFA nationality.

No.	Pos.	Nation	Player
12	DF	ENG	Harry Maguire (at Wigan Athletic until the end of the 2014–15 season)
23	MF	ENG	Tom Ince (at Derby County until the end of the 2014–15 season)
—	FW	ATG	Calaum Jahraldo-Martin (at Alloa Athletic until the end of the 2014–15 season)
—	GK	ENG	Mark Oxley (at Hibernian until the end of the 2014–15 season)
—	DF	ENG	Conor Townsend (at Scunthorpe United until the end of the 2014–15 season)

=== Squad detail ===
N	Pos.	Nat.	Name	Age	EU	Since	App	Goals	Ends	Transfer fee	Notes
22	GK	(England)	Steve Harper	40	EU	2013	31	0	2015	Free	
16	GK	(Switzerland)	Eldin Jakupović	30	EU	2012	13	0	2016	Free	
1	GK	(Scotland)	Allan McGregor	33	EU	2013	59	0	2016	£1,500,000	
—	GK	(England)	Mark Oxley	24	EU	2008	1	0	2015	£150,000	
4	DF	(Northern Ireland)	Alex Bruce	30	EU	2012	87	0	Undisclosed	Free	
5	DF	(Wales)	James Chester	26	EU	2011 (Winter)	171	8	2016	£300,000	
6	DF	(England)	Curtis Davies	30	EU	2013	68	5	2016	£2,250,000	
21	DF	(England)	Michael Dawson	31	EU	2014	28	1	2017	£3,500,000	
19	DF	(Northern Ireland)	Joe Dudgeon	24	EU	2011	39	0	2015	£300,000	
3	DF	(Honduras)	Maynor Figueroa	32	EU	2013	45	0	2015	Free	
31	DF	(Republic of Ireland)	Brian Lenihan	20	EU	2014	0	0	2017	Undisclosed	
12	DF	(England)	Harry Maguire	22	EU	2014	6	0	2017	£2,500,000	
15	DF	(Republic of Ireland)	Paul McShane	29	EU	2008	136	5	2015	£2,000,000	On loan from Sunderland in Aug 2008, permanently signed Aug 2009
26	DF	(Scotland)	Andrew Robertson	21	EU	2014	24	0	2017	£2,850,000	
2	DF	(England)	Liam Rosenior	30	EU	2010	161	1	2015	Free	
28	DF	(England)	Conor Townsend	22	EU	2011	1	0	2016	Youth system	
11	MF	(Republic of Ireland)	Robbie Brady	23	EU	2011	123	14	2016	£2,000,000	On loan from Man Utd in Jul 2011 & Nov 2012, permanently signed Jan 2013
17	MF	(Senegal)	Mohamed Diamé	27		2014	12	4	2017	Undisclosed	
27	MF	(Egypt)	Ahmed Elmohamady	27	EU	2012	129	8	2016	£2,000,000	On loan from Sunderland in Aug 2012 & Jan 2013, permanently signed Jun 2013
8	MF	(England)	Tom Huddlestone	28	EU	2013	75	4	2016	£5,250,000	
23	MF	(England)	Tom Ince	23	EU	2014	13	1	2016	Free	
14	MF	(England)	Jake Livermore	25	EU	2013	80	4	2017	£8,000,000	On loan from Tottenham in Aug 2013, permanently signed Jun 2014
7	MF	(Republic of Ireland)	David Meyler	26	EU	2012 (Winter)	101	10	2016	£1,500,000	On loan from Sunderland in Nov 2012, permanently signed Jan 2013
29	MF	(Republic of Ireland)	Stephen Quinn	29	EU	2012	97	5	2015	£100,000	
10	MF	(Scotland)	Robert Snodgrass	27	EU	2014	3	0	2017	£6,000,000	
24	FW	(Nigeria)	Sone Aluko	26	EU	2012	75	12	2016	Free	
9	FW	(Uruguay)	Abel Hernández	24	EU	2014	26	4	2017	Undisclosed	
—	FW	(Antigua and Barbuda)	Calaum Jahraldo-Martin	22	EU	2013	2	0	2014 (Note: Signed 18 month contract in March 2013)	Free	
18	FW	(Croatia)	Nikica Jelavić	29	EU	2014 (Winter)	45	12	2017	£6,500,000	
28	FW	(Senegal)	Dame N'Doye	30	EU	2015 (Winter)	15	5	2017	Undisclosed	
20	FW	(Ivory Coast)	Yannick Sagbo	27	EU	2013	43	4	2015	£1,500,000	

- Last updated: 21 June 2015
- Source: Hull City AFC Official Site

== Transfers ==
This section only lists transfers and loans for the 2014–15 season, which began 1 July 2014. For transactions in May and June 2014, see transfers and loans for the 2013–14 season.

=== Players in ===
Date	Player	From	Fee	Ref
25 June 2014	(England) Jake Livermore	(England) Tottenham Hotspur	Undisclosed (Note: A club record fee, reported by the BBC to be about £8 million.)	
30 June 2014	(Scotland) Robert Snodgrass	(England) Norwich City	Undisclosed (Note: Believed to be in excess of £6 million.)	
7 July 2014	(England) Tom Ince	(England) Blackpool	Free (Note: Compensation to Blackpool to be agreed.)	
29 July 2014	(England) Harry Maguire	(England) Sheffield United	£2,500,000	
29 July 2014	(Scotland) Andrew Robertson	(Scotland) Dundee United	£2,850,000	
26 August 2014	(England) Michael Dawson	(England) Tottenham Hotspur	£3,500,000	
1 September 2014	(Republic of Ireland) Brian Lenihan	(Republic of Ireland) Cork City	Undisclosed	
1 September 2014	(Uruguay) Abel Hernández	(Italy) Palermo	Undisclosed (Note: A club record fee, reported by the BBC to be about £10 million.)	
1 September 2014	(Senegal) Mohamed Diamé	(England) West Ham United	Undisclosed	
1 January 2015	(England) Greg Luer	(England) Burgess Hill Town	Undisclosed	
2 February 2015	(Senegal) Dame N'Doye	(Russia) Lokomotiv Moscow	Undisclosed	

=== Players out ===
Date	Player	To	Fee	Ref
23 May 2014	(England) James Armstrong	(England) Sunderland Ryhope Community Association	Free	
23 May 2014	(England) Matty Fryatt	(England) Nottingham Forest	Free	
23 May 2014	(Republic of Ireland) Conor Henderson	(England) Crawley Town	Free	
23 May 2014	(Slovenia) Robert Koren	(Australia) Melbourne City	Free	
23 May 2014	(Senegal) Abdoulaye Faye	(Malaysia) Sabah FA	Free	
24 June 2014	(Northern Ireland) Paul McElroy	(England) Sheffield Wednesday	Free	
1 July 2014	(England) Cameron Stewart	(England) Ipswich Town	Free	
7 August 2014	(Germany) Nick Proschwitz	(England) Brentford	Free	
14 August 2014	(Republic of Ireland) Shane Long	(England) Southampton	Undisclosed (Note: Reported by the BBC to be about £12 million or £12.5 million according to the Hull Daily Mail.)	
1 September 2014	(Scotland) George Boyd	(England) Burnley	Undisclosed (Note: Reported by the BBC to be about £3 million)	
23 January 2015	(Switzerland) Karim Rossi	(Belgium) Zulte Waregem	Free	

=== Loans in ===
Date From	Player	From	Date To	Ref
1 September 2014	(Uruguay) Gastón Ramírez	(England) Southampton	30 June 2015	
1 September 2014	(France) Hatem Ben Arfa	(England) Newcastle United	5 January 2015	

=== Loans out ===
Date From	Player	To	Date To	Ref
28 July 2014	(England) Mark Oxley	(Scotland) Hibernian	30 June 2015	
29 July 2014	(England) Conor Townsend	(Scotland) Dundee United	3 February 2015	
31 July 2014	(Northern Ireland) Joe Dudgeon	(England) Barnsley	5 January 2015	
30 September 2014	(Ivory Coast) Yannick Sagbo	(England) Wolverhampton Wanderers	13 November 2014	
21 October 2014	(Honduras) Maynor Figueroa	(England) Wigan Athletic	22 December 2014	
30 October 2014	(England) Tom Ince	(England) Nottingham Forest	22 December 2014	
7 November 2014	(Republic of Ireland) Brian Lenihan	(England) Blackpool	25 November 2014	
20 November 2014	(England) Will Aimson	(England) Tranmere Rovers	28 November 2014	
20 November 2014	(Antigua and Barbuda) Calaum Jahraldo-Martin	(England) Tranmere Rovers	1 January 2015	
27 January 2015	(Antigua and Barbuda) Calaum Jahraldo-Martin	(Scotland) Alloa Athletic	30 June 2015	
2 February 2015	(England) Tom Ince	(England) Derby County	30 June 2015	
2 February 2015	(England) Greg Luer	(England) Port Vale	2 March 2015	
6 February 2015	(England) Rory Watson	(England) Gainsborough Trinity	30 June 2015	
10 February 2015	(England) Harry Maguire	(England) Wigan Athletic	30 June 2015	
28 February 2015	(England) Conor Townsend	(England) Scunthorpe United	30 June 2015	
13 March 2015	(England) Johnny Margetts	(England) Cambridge United	30 June 2015	

== Competitions ==
=== Pre-season ===
Pre-season matches were announced on 19 May 2014 with two matches at the same time on 21 July 2014 against North Ferriby United and Harrogate Town. This to be followed by matches against York City on 23 July and Barnsley on 26 July.

Players reported back for pre-season training on 8 July 2014 and departed for a training camp in Portugal later in the week.

On 8 July 2014, a pre-season friendly against VfB Stuttgart was announced for 10 August 2014 at the Mercedes-Benz Arena in Stuttgart, Germany.

21 July 2014	North Ferriby United	1–1	Hull City	North Ferriby
19:30 BST	Gray 79'	Report	Long 51' (pen.)	Stadium: Eon Visual Media Stadium; Attendance: 2,203

21 July 2014	Harrogate Town	0–5	Hull City	Harrogate
19:30 BST		Report 1 Report 2	Boyd 23', 68'; Brady 42', 50'; Jahraldo-Martin 56'	Stadium: Wetherby Road; Attendance: 540

23 July 2014	York City	0–2	Hull City	York
19:30 BST		Report 1 Report 2	Aluko 50'; Sagbo 76'	Stadium: Bootham Crescent; Attendance: 2,301; Referee: Scott Duncan

26 July 2014	Barnsley	1–1	Hull City	Barnsley
15:00 BST	Hourihane 60'	Report 1 Report 2	Long 47'	Stadium: Oakwell; Attendance: 2,929; Referee: Andy Madley

10 August 2014	VfB Stuttgart	1–2	Hull City	Stuttgart, Germany
16:00	Ibišević 38'	Report	Meyler 5'; Robertson 12'	Stadium: Mercedes-Benz Arena; Attendance: 23,500

=== Overall ===
Competition	Started round	Current position / round	Final position / round	First match	Last match
Premier League	—	—	18th	16 August 2014	24 May 2015
League Cup	Third round	—	Third round	24 September 2014	24 September 2014
FA Cup	Third round	—	Third round	4 January 2015	4 January 2015
UEFA Europa League	Third qualifying round	—	Play-off round	31 July 2014	28 August 2014

Updated to match played 28 May 2015
Source: Competitions

=== Premier League ===
==== League table ====
Pos	Team	Pld	W	D	L	GF	GA	GD	Pts	Qualification or relegation
16	Sunderland	38	7	17	14	31	53	−22	38	
17	Aston Villa	38	10	8	20	31	57	−26	38	
18	Hull City (R)	38	8	11	19	33	51	−18	35	Relegation to Football League Championship
19	Burnley (R)	38	7	12	19	28	53	−25	33	Relegation to Football League Championship
20	Queens Park Rangers (R)	38	8	6	24	42	73	−31	30	Relegation to Football League Championship

Source: Barclays Premier League
Rules for classification: 1) Points; 2) Goal difference; 3) Goals scored; 4) Play-offs (only if needed to decide champion, teams for relegation or teams for UEFA competitions).
(R) Relegated

==== Results summary ====
Overall								Home						Away					
Pld	W	D	L	GF	GA	GD	Pts	W	D	L	GF	GA	GD	W	D	L	GF	GA	GD
38	8	11	19	33	51	−18	35	5	5	9	19	24	−5	3	6	10	14	27	−13

Last updated: 25 May 2015.
Source: Premier League

==== Result by matchday ====
Matchday	1	2	3	4	5	6	7	8	9	10	11	12	13	14	15	16	17	18	19	20	21	22	23	24	25	26	27	28	29	30	31	32	33	34	35	36	37	38
Ground	A	H	A	H	A	H	H	A	A	H	A	H	A	A	H	A	H	A	H	H	A	A	H	A	H	H	A	H	A	H	A	A	A	H	H	H	A	H
Result	W	D	L	D	D	L	W	D	D	L	L	L	L	D	D	L	L	W	L	W	L	L	L	D	W	W	L	D	D	L	L	L	W	W	L	L	L	D
Position	3	5	9	10	9	14	8	9	9	13	14	16	17	17	18	19	19	17	17	15	18	18	18	17	15	15	15	15	15	15	15	17	16	15	17	18	18	18

Updated to match(es) played on 25 May 2015. Source: Statto.com
A = Away; H = Home; W = Win; D = Draw; L = Loss

==== Matches ====
The fixtures for the 2014–15 season were announced on 18 June 2014 at 9 am.

16 August 2014 1	Queens Park Rangers	0–1	Hull City	Shepherd's Bush, London
15:00 BST	Dunne (yellow card) 69'	Report	Davies (yellow card) 27'; Chester 52'; Jelavić (yellow card) 79'	Stadium: Loftus Road; Attendance: 17,603; Referee: Craig Pawson

24 August 2014 2	Hull City	1–1	Stoke City	Kingston upon Hull
13:30 BST	Chester (red card) 14'; Jelavić 42'; Robertson (yellow card) 51'	Report	Diouf (yellow card) 38'; Bardsley (yellow card) 44'; Krkić (yellow card) 61'; Shawcross 83'	Stadium: KC Stadium; Attendance: 24,348; Referee: Jonathan Moss

31 August 2014 3	Aston Villa	2–1	Hull City	Birmingham
13:30 BST	Agbonlahor 14'; Weimann 36'; Guzan (yellow card) 90'	Report	Davies (yellow card) 42'; Jelavić 74', (yellow card) 82'; Elmohamady (yellow card) 84'; Quinn (yellow card) 87'	Stadium: Villa Park; Attendance: 28,336; Referee: Mark Clattenburg

15 September 2014 4	Hull City	2–2	West Ham United	Kingston upon Hull
20:00 BST	Hernández 39'; Huddlestone (yellow card) 54'; Robertson (yellow card) 60'; Diamé 64'; Livermore (yellow card) 90+4'	Report	Valencia 50'; Davies 67' (o.g.); Reid (yellow card) 90+4'	Stadium: KC Stadium; Attendance: 21,275; Referee: Martin Atkinson

20 September 2014 5	Newcastle United	2–2	Hull City	Newcastle
15:00 BST	Coloccini (yellow card) 52'; Sissoko (yellow card) 59'; Cabella (yellow card) 73'; Cissé 73', 87'	Report	Jelavić 48'; Robertson (yellow card) 59'; Diamé 68'; Aluko (yellow card) 90+3'	Stadium: St James' Park; Attendance: 49,119; Referee: Neil Swarbrick

27 September 2014 6	Hull City	2–4	Manchester City	Kingston upon Hull
15:00 BST	Mangala 21' (o.g.); Hernández 32' (pen.)	Report	Agüero 7'; Džeko 11', 68'; Mangala (yellow card) 31'; Clichy (yellow card) 84'; Lampard 87'	Stadium: KC Stadium; Attendance: 22,859; Referee: Anthony Taylor

4 October 2014 7	Hull City	2–0	Crystal Palace	Kingston upon Hull
15:00 BST	Livermore (yellow card) 35'; Diamé 60'; Jelavić 89'	Report	Campbell (yellow card) 44'; Mariappa (yellow card) 55'	Stadium: KC Stadium; Attendance: 24,281; Referee: Mike Dean

18 October 2014 8	Arsenal	2–2	Hull City	Holloway, London
15:00 BST	Sánchez 13'; Wilshere (yellow card) 69'; Cazorla (yellow card) 80'; Welbeck 90+1'	Report	Diamé 17'; Chester (yellow card) 44'; Hernández 46'; Huddlestone (yellow card) 66'	Stadium: Emirates Stadium; Attendance: 60,004; Referee: Roger East

25 October 2014 9	Liverpool	0–0	Hull City	Liverpool
15:00 BST	Sterling (yellow card) 55'; Balotelli (yellow card) 57'; Henderson (yellow card) 81'	Report	Huddlestone (yellow card) 40'; Ben Arfa (yellow card) 50'	Stadium: Anfield; Attendance: 44,591; Referee: Neil Swarbrick

1 November 2014 10	Hull City	0–1	Southampton	Kingston upon Hull
15:00 GMT	Diamé (yellow card) 90'	Report	Wanyama 3'	Stadium: KC Stadium; Attendance: 22,828; Referee: Martin Atkinson

8 November 2014 11	Burnley	1–0	Hull City	Burnley
15:00 GMT	Shackell (yellow card) 28'; Ward (yellow card) 42'; Barnes 50'; Duff (yellow card) 56'; Marney (yellow card) 86'; Ings (yellow card) 90'; Jutkiewicz (yellow card) 90+4'	Report	Chester (yellow card) 7'; Hernández (yellow card) 72'; Brady (yellow card) 90+2'; Livermore (yellow card) 90+2'	Stadium: Turf Moor; Attendance: 16,998; Referee: Mark Clattenburg

23 November 2014 12	Hull City	1–2	Tottenham Hotspur	Kingston upon Hull
16:00 GMT	Livermore 8', (yellow card) 62'; Ramírez (red card) 50'; Huddlestone (yellow card) 63'; Robertson (yellow card) 90+2'	Report	Dier (yellow card) 33'; Kane 61'; Eriksen 90'	Stadium: KC Stadium; Attendance: 23,561; Referee: Craig Pawson

29 November 2014 13	Manchester United	3–0	Hull City	Manchester
15:00 GMT	Smalling 16'; Rooney 42'; Fellaini (yellow card) 47'; Van Persie 66'; Rojo (yellow card) 89'	Report	Chester (yellow card) 54'; Dawson (yellow card) 65'	Stadium: Old Trafford; Attendance: 75,345; Referee: Anthony Taylor

3 December 2014 14	Everton	1–1	Hull City	Walton, Liverpool
19:45 GMT	Lukaku 34'; Baines (yellow card) 78'	Report	Dawson (yellow card) 24'; Aluko 59'	Stadium: Goodison Park; Attendance: 34,645; Referee: Robert Madley

6 December 2014 15	Hull City	0–0	West Bromwich Albion	Kingston upon Hull
15:00 GMT	Meyler (yellow card) 60'	Report	Mulumbu (yellow card) 90'	Stadium: KC Stadium; Attendance: 23,279; Referee: Michael Oliver

13 December 2014 16	Chelsea	2–0	Hull City	Fulham, London
15:00 GMT	Hazard 7'; Willian (yellow card) 31'; Cahill (yellow card) 38'; Costa (yellow card) 58', (goal) 68'	Report	Huddlestone (yellow card) 15' (red card) 60'; Meyler (yellow card) 26'; Alex Bruce (yellow card) 57'; Chester (yellow card) 66'	Stadium: Stamford Bridge; Attendance: 41,626; Referee: Chris Foy

20 December 2014 17	Hull City	0–1	Swansea City	Kingston upon Hull
15:00 GMT	Livermore (yellow card) 27'; Aluko (yellow card) 67'	Report	Ki 15'; Richards (yellow card) 40'; Taylor (yellow card) 75'	Stadium: KC Stadium; Attendance: 21,913; Referee: Mark Clattenburg

26 December 2014 18	Sunderland	1–3	Hull City	Sunderland
15:00 GMT	Johnson 1'; Larsson (yellow card) 16'; Vergini (yellow card) 19'; Gómez (yellow card) 49'; Fletcher (yellow card) 53'; Jones (yellow card) 74'	Report	Ramírez 32'; Chester (yellow card) 45+1', (goal) 51'; Brady (yellow card) 73'; Jelavić 90+6'	Stadium: Stadium of Light; Attendance: 44,817; Referee: Andre Marriner

28 December 2014 19	Hull City	0–1	Leicester City	Kingston upon Hull
15:00 GMT	Quinn (red card) 90+4'	Report	Simpson (yellow card) 31'; Mahrez 32'; Konchesky (yellow card) 58', (yellow card) 88' (red card)	Stadium: KC Stadium; Attendance: 23,809; Referee: Phil Dowd

1 January 2015 20	Hull City	2–0	Everton	Kingston upon Hull
15:00 GMT	Meyler (yellow card) 20'; Elmohamady 33'; Livermore (yellow card) 34'; Jelavić 43'; Maguire (yellow card) 89'	Report	Bešić (yellow card) 11'; Koné (yellow card) 45+2'; Barry (yellow card) 65'; Alcaraz (yellow card) 67' (red card) 86'	Stadium: KC Stadium; Attendance: 23,865; Referee: Kevin Friend

10 January 2015 21	West Bromwich Albion	1–0	Hull City	West Bromwich
15:00 GMT	Yacob (yellow card) 35'; Berahino 78'	Report		Stadium: The Hawthorns; Attendance: 24,818; Referee: Neil Swarbrick

18 January 2015 22	West Ham United	3–0	Hull City	Upton Park, East London
13:30 GMT	Noble (yellow card) 21'; Carroll 49'; Amalfitano 69'; Downing 72'	Report	Elmohamady (yellow card) 34'; Quinn (yellow card) 75'; Meyler (yellow card) 87'	Stadium: The Boleyn Ground; Attendance: 34,914; Referee: Martin Atkinson

31 January 2015 23	Hull City	0–3	Newcastle United	Kingston upon Hull
12:45 GMT	Meyler (yellow card) 25'; Elmohamady (yellow card) 45+2'; Robertson (yellow card) 64'; Livermore (yellow card) 89'	Report	Anita (yellow card) 29'; Cabella 40'; Ameobi 50'; Gouffran 78'	Stadium: KC Stadium; Attendance: 23,925; Referee: Phil Dowd

7 February 2015 24	Manchester City	1–1	Hull City	Manchester
15:00 GMT	Nasri (yellow card) 78'; Fernandinho (yellow card) 85'; Milner 90+2'	Report	Meyler 35'; Elmohamady (yellow card) 60'; Dawson (yellow card) 68'; Livermore (yellow card) 68'; Huddlestone (yellow card) 90+1'	Stadium: City of Manchester Stadium; Attendance: 45,233; Referee: Jonathan Moss

10 February 2015 25	Hull City	2–0	Aston Villa	Kingston upon Hull
19:45 GMT	Jelavić 22'; N'Doye 74'; Dawson (yellow card) 85'	Report	Hutton (yellow card) 41'; Agbonlahor (yellow card) 56'	Stadium: KC Stadium; Attendance: 21,467; Referee: Michael Oliver

21 February 2015 26	Hull City	2–1	Queens Park Rangers	Kingston upon Hull
15:00 GMT	Jelavić 16'; N'Doye 89'	Report	Barton (red card) 32'; Furlong (yellow card) 32'; Austin 39'; Zamora (yellow card) 58'; Zárate (yellow card) 75'; Phillips (yellow card) 80'	Stadium: KC Stadium; Attendance: 24,466; Referee: Anthony Taylor

28 February 2015 27	Stoke City	1–0	Hull City	Stoke-on-Trent
15:00 GMT	Pieters (yellow card) 28'; Moses (yellow card) 43'; Crouch 71'	Report	Meyler (yellow card) 52'; Dawson (yellow card) 77'	Stadium: Britannia Stadium; Attendance: 26,473; Referee: Neil Swarbrick

3 March 2015 28	Hull City	1–1	Sunderland	Kingston upon Hull
19:45 GMT	N'Doye 15'; McShane (yellow card) 41'; Robertson (yellow card) 79'	Report	Brown (yellow card) 12'; Rodwell (yellow card) 36', (goal) 77'; Poyet (red card) 36' (Note: Sunderland's manager Gus Poyet was issued with a red card by referee Mike Dean for his reaction to the yellow card issued to Jack Rodwell for simulation. Before leaving, he approached Hull manager Steve Bruce who reacted to comments made and had to be restrained. Following the incident, Poyet was charged by The FA with improper conduct.); Bridcutt (yellow card) 46'; Cattermole (yellow card) 60'; Larsson (yellow card) 79'; Álvarez (yellow card) 87'	Stadium: KC Stadium; Attendance: 23,017; Referee: Mike Dean

14 March 2015 29	Leicester City	0–0	Hull City	Leicester
15:00		Report	Huddlestone (yellow card) 14' (red card) 72'; Robertson (yellow card) 45'; Dawson (yellow card) 66'; Bruce (yellow card) 68' (Note: Players from both sides surrounded the referee following Alex Bruce's booking and as a result The FA charged Hull with "failing to control players"; Hull later appealed the charge, but this was rejected and the club was fined £30,000.); N'Doye (yellow card) 75'	Stadium: King Power Stadium; Attendance: 31,456; Referee: Jonathan Moss

22 March 2015 30	Hull City	2–3	Chelsea	Kingston upon Hull
16:00 GMT	Elmohamady 26'; Hernández 28'	Report	Hazard 2'; Costa 9'; Cahill (yellow card) 13'; Rémy 77'; Matić (yellow card) 89'	Stadium: KC Stadium; Attendance: 24,598; Referee: Michael Oliver

4 April 2015 31	Swansea City	3–1	Hull City	Swansea
15:00 BST	Ki 18'; Gomis 37', 90+1'; Williams (yellow card) 48'	Report	Hernández (yellow card) 47'; N'Doye (yellow card) 49'; McShane 50', (yellow card) 54'; Meyler (red card) 53'; Bruce (yellow card) 69'; Diamé (yellow card) 89'	Stadium: Liberty Stadium; Attendance: 20,333; Referee: Andre Marriner

11 April 2015 32	Southampton	2–0	Hull City	Southampton
15:00 BST	Pellè (yellow card) 33', (goal) 81'; Wanyama (yellow card) 42'; Ward-Prowse 56' (pen.)	Report		Stadium: St Mary's Stadium; Attendance: 30,359; Referee: Kevin Friend

25 April 2015 33	Crystal Palace	0–2	Hull City	Selhurst, London
15:00 BST		Report	N'Doye 51', 90+2'	Stadium: Selhurst Park; Attendance: 23,876; Referee: Mark Clattenburg

28 April 2015 34	Hull City	1–0	Liverpool	Kingston upon Hull
19:45 BST	Dawson 37'; Livermore (yellow card) 39'; Ramírez (yellow card) 90+5'	Report		Stadium: KC Stadium; Attendance: 24,843; Referee: Lee Probert

4 May 2015 35	Hull City	1–3	Arsenal	Kingston upon Hull
20:00 BST	Livermore (yellow card) 23'; N'Doye (yellow card) 30'; Quinn 56'	Report	Sánchez 28', 45+1'; Ramsey 33'	Stadium: KC Stadium; Attendance: 23,628; Referee: Lee Mason

9 May 2015 36	Hull City	0–1	Burnley	Kingston upon Hull
15:00 BST	Jelavić (yellow card) 67'	Report	Ings 62', (yellow card) 79'	Stadium: KC Stadium; Attendance: 24,877; Referee: Martin Atkinson

16 May 2015 37	Tottenham Hotspur	2–0	Hull City	Tottenham, London
15:00 BST	Mason (yellow card) 42'; Chadli 54'; Bentaleb (yellow card) 57'; Rose (yellow card) 59', (goal) 61'	Report	Meyler (yellow card) 90+2'	Stadium: White Hart Lane; Attendance: 35,857; Referee: Anthony Taylor

24 May 2015 38	Hull City	0–0	Manchester United	Kingston upon Hull
15:00 BST	Dawson (yellow card) 90'; Quinn (yellow card) 90+3'; Abel Hernández (Note: Following the match, The FA charged Abel Hernández with violent conduct for an apparent punch to Phil Jones of Manchester United. After he admitted the charge, he was given a three-match ban, to be served at the start of the 2015–16 season.)	Report	Blind (yellow card) 57'; Fellaini (red card) 77'; Smalling (yellow card) 90+2'	Stadium: KC Stadium; Attendance: 24,745; Referee: Lee Probert

=== League Cup ===
Hull City enter the competition at the third round; because of their involvement in European competition, matches were played during the week commencing 22 September 2014. The draw for the third round took place on 27 August 2014 and Hull were drawn away to follow Premier League side West Bromwich Albion. The match took place on 24 September 2014 at The Hawthorns, and Brown Ideye opened the scoring after 15 minutes for West Brom. Hull fought back with goals either side of the break from Tom Ince and Robbie Brady, but the home team took it with two goals in the last four minutes of the match from Gareth McAuley and Saido Berahino.

24 September 2014 3rd round	West Bromwich Albion	3–2	Hull City	West Bromwich
20:00 BST	Ideye 15'; Gamboa (yellow card) 71'; McAuley 87'; Berahino 88'	Report	Ince 41'; Brady 50'; Bruce (yellow card) 64'	Stadium: The Hawthorns; Attendance: 10,496; Referee: Phil Dowd

=== FA Cup ===
Hull City enter the competition at the third round proper stage with matches taking place in early January 2015. The draw for the third round proper takes place at 7 pm on 8 December 2014 at The Deep in Hull and broadcast live on BBC Two. The first match drawn was Hull away to Arsenal in a repeat of the 2014 FA Cup Final. The match was shown live by the BBC. Arsenal opened the scoring through Per Mertesacker on the 20-minute mark but failed to make further progress until Alexis Sánchez double the score with ten minutes remaining. City made no reply and were knocked out, with Arsenal winning 2–0.

4 January 2015 3rd round	Arsenal	2–0	Hull City	Holloway, London
17:30 GMT	Mertesacker 20'; Sánchez (yellow card) 76', (goal) 82'; Coquelin (yellow card) 88'	Report	McShane (yellow card) 45+1'; Davies (yellow card) 85'	Stadium: Emirates Stadium; Attendance: 59,439; Referee: Robert Madley

=== UEFA Europa League ===
Hull City enter the competition in the third qualifying round, the draw for which took place on 18 July 2014 at UEFA headquarters in Nyon, Switzerland. Hull City were drawn against either AS Trenčín or Vojvodina, with the away-leg being played on 31 July 2014 and the return leg on 7 August 2014. On 24 July 2014, Trenčín won the match 4–3 on aggregate and become City's opponents in the third qualifying round. The away match would be played at the Štadión pod Dubňom, Žilina, Slovakia. The away-leg took place on 31 July 2014 and was Steve Bruce's 100th game in charge of the team. The match ended in a 0–0 draw, with Tom Huddlestone having a penalty saved and firing the rebound against the bar. The home leg on 7 August 2014 at the KC Stadium got off to a quick start for the visitors, with Tomáš Malec netting in two-minutes of the start. Ahmed Elmohamady equalised after 27-minutes, and on the 80th minute mark substitute Sone Aluko won the game for City. Hull were in the draw for the next round that took place on 8 August 2014. Hull were drawn against Belgian team Lokeren with the first-leg to be played 21 August at the Daknamstadion stadium in Daknam with the return leg at the KC Stadium on 28 August 2014. The first-leg was a narrow 1–0 win by Lokeren with a goal scored by Hans Vanaken that followed a goalkeeping error by Allan McGregor. The match was marred by some violence after the match in which some fans from both sides were arrested. The following week at the KC Stadium Hull made the perfect start with Robbie Brady opening the scoring after just 6 minutes. Soon after the break Jordan Remacle levelled the scores, but a penalty was awarded to Hull after 55-minutes and Brady scored his second goal of the match. After 71 minutes, Yannick Sagbo was dismissed following a challenge on Georgios Galitsios. Though Hull won 2–1 on the night, producing an aggregate score of 2–2, Lokeren progressed under the away goals rule.

31 July 2014 3Q 1st-leg	AS Trenčín (Slovakia)	0–0	(England) Hull City	Žilina, Slovakia
18:00 BST	Misak (yellow card) 62'; Hajradinović (yellow card) 79'	Report	Huddlestone (yellow card) 53'; Livermore (yellow card) 76'; Davies (yellow card) 80'	Stadium: Štadión pod Dubňom; Attendance: 8,254; Referee: Davide Massa

7 August 2014 3Q 2nd-leg	Hull City (England)	2–1 (2–1 agg.)	(Slovakia) AS Trenčín	Kingston upon Hull, England
19:30 BST	Elmohamady 27'; Long (yellow card) 39'; Aluko 80'	Report	Malec 2', (yellow card) 90'; Holubek (yellow card) 63'	Stadium: KC Stadium; Attendance: 21,156; Referee: Bas Nijhuis

21 August 2014 PO 1st-leg	Lokeren (Belgium)	1–0	(England) Hull City	Lokeren, Belgium
19:30 BST	Vanaken 58'; Leye (yellow card)	Report 1 Report 2	McShane (yellow card)	Stadium: Daknamstadion; Attendance: 7,935; Referee: Matej Jug

28 August 2014 PO 2nd-leg	Hull City (England)	2–1 (2–2 (a) agg.)	(Belgium) Lokeren	Kingston upon Hull, England
19:45 BST	Brady 6', 55' (pen.); Sagbo (red card) 71'; Rosenior (yellow card); Aluko (yellow card)	Report 1 Report 2	Remacle 49'; Verhulst (yellow card); Persoons (yellow card); Overmeire (yellow card)	Stadium: KC Stadium; Attendance: 18,149 (1,382 Visiting Supporters); Referee: Ovidiu Hațegan

== Statistics ==
=== Captains ===
No.	P	Name	Country	No. games	Notes
6	DF	Curtis Davies	(England)	25	Club captain
21	DF	Michael Dawson	(England)	17	
2	DF	Liam Rosenior	(England)	2	

Last updated: 30 May 2015
Source: Competitive match reports.
Competitive matches only
Matches started as captain only
Country: FIFA nationality; No.: Squad number; P: Position; Name: Player name; No. Games: Number of games started as captain.

=== Appearances ===
As of 30 May 2015

No.	Pos	Nat	Player	Total		Premier League		FA Cup		League Cup		UEFA Europa League	
No.	Pos	Nat	Player	Apps	Goals	Apps	Goals	Apps	Goals	Apps	Goals	Apps	Goals
1	GK	(Scotland) SCO	Allan McGregor	30	0	26	0	0	0	0	0	4	0
2	DF	(England) ENG	Liam Rosenior	18	0	5+8	0	0	0	1	0	3+1	0
3	DF	(Honduras) HON	Maynor Figueroa	7	0	2+1	0	1	0	1	0	2	0
4	DF	(Northern Ireland) NIR	Alex Bruce	25	0	17+5	0	0	0	1	0	2	0
5	DF	(Wales) WAL	James Chester	27	2	22	2	0	0	1	0	4	0
6	DF	(England) ENG	Curtis Davies	25	0	21	0	1	0	0	0	3	0
7	MF	(Republic of Ireland) IRL	David Meyler	32	1	19+9	1	0	0	1	0	3	0
8	MF	(England) ENG	Tom Huddlestone	35	0	30+1	0	1	0	0	0	2+1	0
9	FW	(Uruguay) URU	Abel Hernández	26	4	15+10	4	0+1	0	0	0	0	0
10	MF	(Scotland) SCO	Robert Snodgrass	3	0	1	0	0	0	0	0	1+1	0
11	MF	(Republic of Ireland) IRL	Robbie Brady	32	3	17+10	0	1	0	1	1	3	2
12	DF	(England) ENG	Harry Maguire	6	0	0+3	0	1	0	0+1	0	1	0
14	MF	(England) ENG	Jake Livermore	37	1	35	1	0	0	0+1	0	1	0
15	DF	(Republic of Ireland) IRL	Paul McShane	23	1	19+1	1	1	0	1	0	1	0
16	GK	(Switzerland) SUI	Eldin Jakupović	3	0	2+1	0	0	0	0	0	0	0
17	MF	(Senegal) SEN	Mohamed Diamé	12	4	10+2	4	0	0	0	0	0	0
18	FW	(Croatia) CRO	Nikica Jelavić	29	8	21+5	8	0	0	0	0	0+3	0
19	DF	(Northern Ireland) NIR	Joe Dudgeon	0	0	0	0	0	0	0	0	0	0
20	FW	(Ivory Coast) CIV	Yannick Sagbo	9	0	0+4	0	1	0	1	0	3	0
21	DF	(England) ENG	Michael Dawson	28	1	28	1	0	0	0	0	0	0
22	GK	(England) ENG	Steve Harper	12	0	10	0	1	0	1	0	0	0
23	MF	(England) ENG	Tom Ince	13	1	3+4	0	1	0	1	1	1+3	0
24	FW	(Nigeria) NGA	Sone Aluko	31	2	13+12	1	1	0	0+1	0	3+1	1
25	MF	(Uruguay) URU	Gastón Ramírez	22	1	11+11	1	0	0	0	0	0	0
26	DF	(Scotland) SCO	Andrew Robertson	24	0	17+7	0	0	0	0	0	0	0
27	MF	(Egypt) EGY	Ahmed Elmohamady	43	3	38	2	0+1	0	0	0	3+1	1
28	FW	(Senegal) SEN	Dame N'Doye	15	5	13+2	5	0	0	0	0	0	0
29	MF	(Republic of Ireland) IRL	Stephen Quinn	29	1	17+11	1	1	0	0	0	0	0
34	FW	(France) FRA	Hatem Ben Arfa	9	0	5+3	0	0	0	1	0	0	0
—	GK	(England) ENG	Mark Oxley	0	0	0	0	0	0	0	0	0	0
—	DF	(England) ENG	Conor Townsend	0	0	0	0	0	0	0	0	0	0
—	FW	(Antigua and Barbuda) ATG	Calaum Jahraldo-Martin	0	0	0	0	0	0	0	0	0	0
Players who played for Hull City but were subsequently sold by the club:
9	FW	(Republic of Ireland) IRL	Shane Long	2	0	0	0	0	0	0	0	2	0
17	MF	(Scotland) SCO	George Boyd	2	0	0+1	0	0	0	0	0	1	0

- Source: Compiled from competitive match reports

Note: Appearances shown after a "+" indicate player came on during course of match.

=== Top scorers ===
Player	Number	Position	Premier League	FA Cup	League Cup	UEFA Europa League	Total
(Croatia) Nikica Jelavić	18	FW	8	0	0	0	8
(Senegal) Dame N'Doye	28	FW	5	0	0	0	5
(Senegal) Mohamed Diamé	17	MF	4	0	0	0	4
(Uruguay) Abel Hernández	9	FW	4	0	0	0	4
(Republic of Ireland) Robbie Brady	11	MF	0	0	1	2	3
(Egypt) Ahmed Elmohamady	27	MF	2	0	0	1	3
(Nigeria) Sone Aluko	24	FW	1	0	0	1	2
(Wales) James Chester	5	DF	2	0	0	0	2
(England) Michael Dawson	21	DF	1	0	0	0	1
(England) Tom Ince	23	MF	0	0	1	0	1
(England) Jake Livermore	14	MF	1	0	0	0	1
(Republic of Ireland) Paul McShane	15	DF	1	0	0	0	1
(Republic of Ireland) David Meyler	7	MF	1	0	0	0	1
(Republic of Ireland) Stephen Quinn	29	MF	1	0	0	0	1
(Uruguay) Gastón Ramírez	25	MF	1	0	0	0	1
Total			32	0	2	4	38

=== Disciplinary record ===
Player	Number	Position	Premier League		FA Cup		League Cup		UEFA Europa League		Total	
Player	Number	Position	Booked	Sent off (straight red)	Booked	Sent off (straight red)	Booked	Sent off (straight red)	Booked	Sent off (straight red)	Booked	Sent off (straight red)
(England) Tom Huddlestone	8	MF	8	2	0	0	0	0	1	0	9	2
(Republic of Ireland) David Meyler	7	MF	7	1	0	0	0	0	0	0	7	1
(Wales) James Chester	5	DF	5	1	0	0	0	0	0	0	5	1
(Republic of Ireland) Stephen Quinn	29	MF	3	1	0	0	0	0	0	0	3	1
(Uruguay) Gastón Ramírez	25	MF	0	1	0	0	0	0	0	0	0	1
(Ivory Coast) Yannick Sagbo	20	FW	0	0	0	0	0	0	0	1	0	1
(England) Jake Livermore	14	MF	10	0	0	0	0	0	1	0	11	0
(England) Michael Dawson	21	DF	7	0	0	0	0	0	0	0	7	0
(Scotland) Andrew Robertson	26	DF	7	0	0	0	0	0	0	0	7	0
(Northern Ireland) Alex Bruce	4	DF	3	0	0	0	1	0	0	0	4	0
(England) Curtis Davies	6	DF	2	0	1	0	0	0	1	0	4	0
(Egypt) Ahmed Elmohamady	27	MF	4	0	0	0	0	0	0	0	4	0
(Republic of Ireland) Paul McShane	15	DF	2	0	1	0	0	0	1	0	4	0
(Nigeria) Sone Aluko	24	FW	2	0	0	0	0	0	1	0	3	0
(Croatia) Nikica Jelavić	18	FW	3	0	0	0	0	0	0	0	3	0
(Senegal) Dame N'Doye	28	FW	3	0	0	0	0	0	0	0	3	0
(Republic of Ireland) Robbie Brady	11	MF	2	0	0	0	0	0	0	0	2	0
(Senegal) Mohamed Diamé	17	MF	2	0	0	0	0	0	0	0	2	0
(Uruguay) Abel Hernández	9	FW	2	0	0	0	0	0	0	0	2	0
(France) Hatem Ben Arfa	34	FW	1	0	0	0	0	0	0	0	1	0
(Republic of Ireland) Shane Long	9	FW	0	0	0	0	0	0	1	0	1	0
(England) Harry Maguire	12	DF	1	0	0	0	0	0	0	0	1	0
(Uruguay) Gastón Ramírez	25	MF	1	0	0	0	0	0	0	0	1	0
(England) Liam Rosenior	2	DF	0	0	0	0	0	0	1	0	1	0
Total			75	6	2	0	1	0	7	1	85	7

== Kits ==
On 20 April 2014, 24-minutes into the home match against Arsenal, the club announced they had signed a 4-year deal with kit suppliers Umbro to commence 1 June 2014. On 17 July 2014 the club announced a record breaking two-year shirt sponsorship deal with 12BET. The new home kit design was revealed on 18 July 2014, the away kit on 11 August 2014 and a third strip on 20 August 2014.
