= 2010–11 Manchester United F.C. season =

English football club season

Manchester United
2010–11 season
- Co-chairmen: Joel and Avram Glazer
- Manager: Sir Alex Ferguson
- Stadium: Old Trafford
- Premier League: 1st
- FA Cup: Semi-finals
- League Cup: Fifth round
- UEFA Champions League: Runners-up
- Community Shield: Winners
- Top goalscorer: League: Dimitar Berbatov (20); All: Dimitar Berbatov (21)
- Highest home attendance: 75,486 (vs. Bolton Wanderers, 19 March)
- Lowest home attendance: 46,083 (vs. Wolverhampton Wanderers, 26 October)
- Average home league attendance: 75,109
Home colours	Away colours	Third colours

The 2010–11 season was Manchester United's 19th season in the Premier League and their 36th consecutive season in the top-flight of English football. It was the first season with new shirt sponsors Aon after four seasons with AIG.

United began the season by beating Chelsea 3–1 at Wembley on 8 August 2010 to claim the Community Shield.

A successful defence of the League Cup would have seen them become only the second team to win the competition for a third successive season, after Liverpool in 1983. However, their title defence came to an end as United fielded an understrength side that was battered 4–0 by West Ham United at Upton Park in the fifth round on 30 November 2010.

On 19 December 2010, Sir Alex Ferguson became the longest-serving manager in Manchester United's history, overtaking Sir Matt Busby's record of 24 years, 1 month and 13 days in charge of the club.

On 1 February 2011, United equalled the club record league unbeaten run of 29 matches, after a 3–1 win over Aston Villa at Old Trafford. They failed to extend the run however, succumbing to a 2–1 defeat against Wolverhampton Wanderers at Molineux on 5 February 2011. This was their first league defeat since 3 April 2010, a 2–1 home defeat by Chelsea. United came close to becoming the first top-flight side in 119 years to win every single home league match during the season, but a draw at home to West Bromwich Albion early in the campaign cost them that status. Their exceptional form at Old Trafford was key to United's eventual title victory, as their away form was surprisingly mediocre, with just five league wins away from home all season.

United also reached the semi-final stage of the 2010–11 FA Cup but lost 1–0 at Wembley to local rivals Manchester City on 16 April 2011. Defeat in this game ended United's chances of becoming the first club to win the league and cup double four times.

On 14 May 2011, after a 1–1 draw to Blackburn Rovers at Ewood Park, United broke the English league title record by winning their 19th title, surpassing Liverpool's record of 18 titles, which they equalled in the 2008–09 season. This is the first time United have held the outright record in their history.

For the third time in four years, the club reached the final of the UEFA Champions League, to be played at Wembley. In a repeat of the 2009 final, they lost 3–1 to Barcelona.

This season was to be the last for goalkeeper Edwin van der Sar, as on 27 January 2011, he announced that he would retire at the end of the season.

== Pre-season and friendlies ==
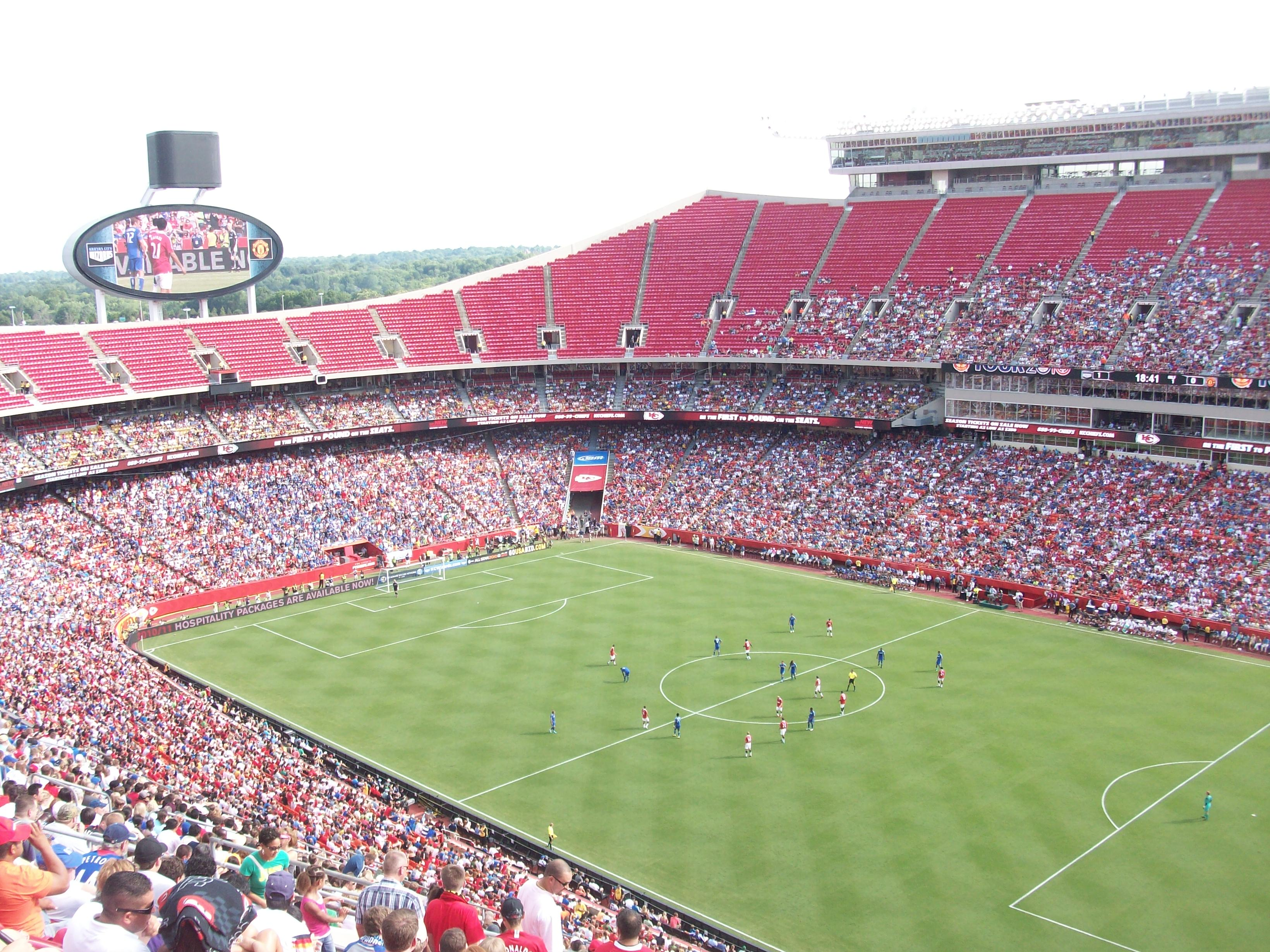
Manchester United's pre-season tour included a 2–1 defeat against the Kansas City Wizards at Arrowhead Stadium.

Manchester United announced their first fixture of the 2010 pre-season schedule on 8 April 2010. As part of the signing of Javier Hernández, United agreed to play a friendly against Guadalajara to open their new 45,000-capacity stadium, Estadio Chivas, on 30 July.

On 6 May 2010, Manchester United announced that the team would be touring North America that summer for the first time since 2004. A 22-man squad, including new signing Chris Smalling, but minus those who took part in the 2010 FIFA World Cup, flew out to the United States on 12 July, before taking part in a training camp in Chicago, the headquarters of new shirt sponsors Aon. The first tour match was played on 16 July over the border at the Rogers Centre in Toronto, where United beat a travelling Celtic side 3–1 with goals from Dimitar Berbatov, Danny Welbeck and Tom Cleverley. The next fixture, against Philadelphia Union was played on 21 July at Lincoln Financial Field, one of the venues on both their 2003 and 2004 tours. United won the match 1–0 with a 76th-minute goal from Gabriel Obertan. Four days later, the team travelled west to Kansas City, Missouri, to play the Kansas City Wizards at Arrowhead Stadium. The Wizards opened the scoring in the 11th minute, before Dimitar Berbatov equalised with a 41st-minute penalty; however, two minutes later the Wizards restored their lead with a controversial goal from Kei Kamara. The Sierra Leonean forward headed the ball against the crossbar and it bounced down onto the goal-line; the referee believed the whole of the ball had crossed the line and gave the goal.

The tour of the United States culminated with the 2010 MLS All-Star Game on 28 July at Reliant Stadium in Houston, Texas. United won the match 5–2, with goals from Federico Macheda (2), Darron Gibson, Tom Cleverley and a debut goal from Javier Hernández. Macheda's first goal came after only 21 seconds, when he capitalised on an under-hit back-pass; he got his second in the 13th minute, heading in Nani's corner kick. Brian Ching pulled a goal back for the MLS All-Stars in the 64th minute, before Darron Gibson restored United's two-goal lead with a free-kick from 20 yards in the 70th minute. Three minutes later, Tom Cleverley made it 4–1 with a well-taken goal, controlling Darren Fletcher's flick into the box before flicking it over Wilman Conde's head and side-footing past goalkeeper Nick Rimando. Hernández's goal came in the 84th minute, when he collected a long through-ball from Darren Fletcher before lobbing Rimando to make the score 5–1. Dwayne De Rosario then scored a late consolation goal in the final minute. The squad then headed south to play United's first ever match in Mexico against Chivas two days later. Javier Hernández began the game in a Chivas shirt and opened the scoring for his old club after eight minutes. Chris Smalling's first Manchester United goal levelled the scores two minutes later, but Chivas regained the lead just before half-time through Adolfo Bautista. At the break, Hernández switched sides and came on in place of Dimitar Berbatov. Héctor Reynoso increased the hosts' lead to 3–1 just before the hour-mark, when Hernández finally left the action. Nani pulled a goal back 10 minutes from the end, but the score remained at 3–2 until the end. The result meant that United finished their tour of North America with three wins and two defeats.

Following the team's return to Europe, Manchester United rounded off their pre-season schedule by taking on a League of Ireland XI in the first match to be played at the new Aviva Stadium in Dublin on 4 August. World Cup stars Wayne Rooney, Michael Carrick, Park Ji-sung and Nemanja Vidić all made their returns to the United side, as did Michael Owen and Antonio Valencia, who were recovering from injury. Park opened the scoring in the 13th minute in bizarre fashion; as he went to block a defender's clearance, the ball ricocheted off him and into the net. Michael Owen doubled United's lead in the 25th minute with a chipped shot over the goalkeeper, before half-time substitute Hernández made it 3–0 two minutes after the break. Three goals in the space of nine minutes from Valencia (60th minute), a second from Park (63rd), and Jonny Evans (69th) increased the lead to 6–0, but Dave Mulcahy scored a consolation goal for the League of Ireland XI in the 78th minute. Nevertheless, there was still time for Nani to get a seventh goal, converting a penalty after Hernández had been fouled in the penalty area.

On 8 April, it was announced that a testimonial had been granted to Gary Neville, who had announced his retirement on 2 February. The match was held to honour and celebrate Neville's 19 years of service to United, and was played at Old Trafford on 24 May, the opponents being Juventus of the Italian Serie A. Neville has confirmed that he will use the proceeds from the testimonial to support sustainable projects within the community, while he also has plans for supporter initiatives at home and abroad.

The match against Juventus featured some of Fergie's Fledglings, the young players from the Class of '92, including the former United players, Nicky Butt, Gary's brother Phil, David Beckham, and current United players.

Date	Opponents	H / A	Result F–A	Scorers	Attendance
16 July 2010	Celtic	N	3–1	Berbatov 34', Welbeck 79', Cleverley 86'	39,139
21 July 2010	Philadelphia Union	A	1–0	Obertan 76'	44,213
25 July 2010	Kansas City Wizards	N	1–2	Berbatov 41' (pen.)	52,424
28 July 2010	MLS All-Stars	N	5–2	Macheda (2) 1', 13', Gibson 70', Cleverley 73', Hernández 84'	70,728
30 July 2010	Guadalajara	A	2–3	Smalling 10', Nani 79'	
4 August 2010	Airtricity League XI	N	7–1	Park (2) 13', 63', Owen 25', Hernández 47', Valencia 60', J. Evans 69', Nani 82' (pen.)	49,861
24 May 2011	Juventus	H	1–2	Rooney 19'	

== FA Community Shield ==
As Chelsea won the League and Cup Double in 2009–10, Manchester United kicked their season off with an appearance in the 2010 FA Community Shield at Wembley on 8 August as Premier League runners-up. It was the third time in four years that United had played Chelsea in the Community Shield. United won the match 3–1 with goals from Antonio Valencia, Javier Hernández and Dimitar Berbatov. Valencia opened the scoring in the 41st minute, side-footing home a low, first-time cross from Wayne Rooney. Rooney and Michael Owen were substituted for Hernández and Berbatov at half-time, and Hernández doubled United's lead in the 76th minute; John O'Shea set Valencia away down the right flank, and the Ecuadorian played a low cross back across goal; Hernández got to the ball with his right foot, but it bounced up and hit him in the face before going in. Salomon Kalou got a goal back for Chelsea with seven minutes left in normal time, but Berbatov sealed the win in the 92nd minute with a lobbed shot over Chelsea goalkeeper Henrique Hilário after some neat inter-play from fellow substitutes Darren Fletcher, Ryan Giggs and Nani on the left wing.

Date	Opponents	H / A	Result F–A	Scorers	Attendance
8 August 2010	Chelsea	N	3–1	Valencia 41', Hernández 76', Berbatov 90+2'	84,623

== Premier League ==
The fixtures for the 2010–11 Premier League were announced on 17 June, and revealed that United would begin their league campaign by welcoming Newcastle United back to the Premier League at Old Trafford on 16 August 2010, just as they did at the start of the 2008–09 season.

With United's opening match being played on the Monday, their rivals had the chance to get an early head-start in the title race, with Chelsea going to the top with a 6–0 win over West Bromwich Albion on the Saturday. It took United just over half an hour to open the scoring against Newcastle; when Jonás Gutiérrez dwelled on the ball, he allowed Antonio Valencia to steal it off his toes. Paul Scholes then took possession and played a through-ball to Dimitar Berbatov, who shot across Newcastle goalkeeper Steve Harper into the far corner of the goal. For the second goal, Nani played the ball into the penalty area for Patrice Evra, who put a low cross into the six-yard box. The ball ricocheted off Wayne Rooney to Darren Fletcher, who scored with a shot on the turn. After coming on as a substitute in the 71st minute, Ryan Giggs maintained his record of scoring in every season of the Premier League with a goal five minutes from full-time; Paul Scholes floated the ball to Giggs with a diagonal pass, and the Welsh midfielder volleyed it into the far side of the goal. The 3–0 win put United into fourth place in the league table at the end of the first round of league matches.

United's next match came the following Sunday, away to Fulham. Scholes opened the scoring in the 11th minute, firing a 25-yard strike into the bottom corner of the net for his 150th Manchester United goal, after being set up by Berbatov. Simon Davies equalised for Fulham ten minutes into the second half, but Brede Hangeland deflected a corner into his own net to put United ahead again with five minutes left to play. A minute later, Damien Duff was deemed to have handled the ball in the Fulham penalty area, but Nani's kick was saved by goalkeeper David Stockdale. Then, in the 89th minute, Hangeland redeemed himself with a header from a corner to deny United the win.

United played host to West Ham United in the evening kick-off on Saturday, 28 August. Wayne Rooney got the first goal from the penalty spot in the 33rd minute – his first goal in 13 club matches – after Ryan Giggs had been fouled in the penalty area by former Manchester United defender Jonathan Spector. Nani scored the second goal five minutes after half-time, picking up a pass from Rooney before cutting into the box and firing a left-footed shot past Robert Green in the West Ham goal. Nani then set up Berbatov to make it 3–0, chipping the ball across the penalty area for the Bulgarian forward to score with a volleyed scissor-kick.

After a break for internationals, United travelled to Goodison Park on 11 September to take on Everton: the first of a league double-header against Liverpudlian opposition. Everton had the upper hand for the first half-hour, while United's best chances were denied by saves from Tim Howard. Following a 39th-minute corner off one of these saves, Evra failed to deal with a long ball out of the Everton defence, allowing Mikel Arteta to bear down on Edwin van der Sar's goal; the Dutch goalkeeper saved Arteta's shot, but the rebound fell to Leon Osman, who squared the ball for Steven Pienaar to side-foot under Van der Sar and into the net. However, Everton's lead was short-lived as Giggs found Nani on the right wing, and the Portuguese bent over an early cross for Fletcher to volley home. United took the lead for the first time two minutes after half-time: a Nani corner was half-cleared by Osman before the ball came back to Nani, who crossed for the unmarked Nemanja Vidić to head home. Berbatov made it 3–1 in the 65th minute with a shot off the outside of his boot from just outside the penalty area after he beat Distin to a long ball from Scholes. The score remained at 3–1 until the 90th minute, when two Everton attacks down the left wing produced goals for Tim Cahill and Mikel Arteta, salvaging a draw from the jaws of defeat.

United's next league match was at home to rivals Liverpool. United made most of the running in the first half with Nani missing their best chance after a shot from Wayne Rooney was diverted into his path midway through the first half. However, with around five minutes to go before the break, a corner was met by the stooping head of Berbatov and sailed past Pepe Reina and into the back of the net. Just after the hour mark, Berbatov extended the lead to 2–0, controlling a cross from Nani before executing an overhead bicycle kick that struck the underside of the crossbar and found the back of the net. However, United again gave up a two-goal lead against Merseyside opposition, conceding two goals to Steven Gerrard within six minutes. The first came from the penalty spot after Fernando Torres was fouled by Jonny Evans, and the second from a direct free kick after Torres was again fouled, this time by John O'Shea. Nevertheless, it was Berbatov who finished the scoring seven minutes from time with a header from an O'Shea cross, to make it 3–2. Berbatov became the first Manchester United player to score a hat-trick against Liverpool since Stan Pearson in 1946, and the first to do so at Old Trafford since Joe Spence in 1928, Pearson's hat-trick having been scored at Maine Road, where United played temporarily following the Second World War while Old Trafford underwent repairs for bomb damage.

After a midweek trip to Scunthorpe United, United's next trip was to the Reebok Stadium to face Bolton Wanderers. United continued to leak goals from set plays as Zat Knight rose highest to nod home a corner to put the home side 1–0 up after only 6 minutes. United responded quickly and were level on 23 minutes when Nani picked up the ball deep in his own half and ran the length of the pitch to slot home past Jussi Jääskeläinen. Bolton regained the lead midway through the second half when City old boy Martin Petrov smashed a right footed shot past Edwin van der Sar. Shortly after, Bolton spurned a golden chance to go 3–1 up. United were only behind for 7 minutes as Michael Owen glanced a header to equalise from a Nani free kick.

Following a midweek victory in Valencia, United were again on the road to the Stadium of Light to face former Red Steve Bruce. United were forced to switch changing rooms 15 minutes before kick off as a burst sewage pipe engulfed the United dressing room. With the game starting late Sunderland were quick out the blocks and forced United back as United struggled to carve out any chances. The game finished 0–0 and saw United create precious few chances meaning United were still without an away win this season.

After the international break, United welcomed promoted West Bromwich Albion to Old Trafford. United took an early lead when Javier Hernández put United 1–0 up with his first Premier League goal. Twenty minutes later, United were 2–0 up when Nani scored his third League goal of the season. West Brom came out for the second half and had soon reduced the difference when a low driven free kick forced Patrice Evra to divert the ball in his own net. West Brom were level on 55 minutes when a Chris Brunt cross was dropped by Edwin van der Sar, which left Somen Tchoyi with a simple tap in to leave the score 2–2.

With the news ringing in their ears that Wayne Rooney had signed a new five-year contract, United headed off to the Potteries to face Stoke City. With Rooney still injured, Ferguson started with Javier Hernández alongside Dimitar Berbatov. It was the Mexican who opened the scoring when a Nani cross was flicked on by Nemanja Vidić and onto the back of Hernández's head past Thomas Sørensen. The score stayed 1–0 until the 81st minute when Tuncay picked the ball up wide left, cut inside and fired a shot into the corner for Stoke's first ever goal against Manchester United in the Premier League. With three minutes left, however, a Patrice Evra shot was deflected into the path of Javier Hernández who stabbed his second goal home from short range for his third goal in two games. United held out for their first away victory in the league all season.

United's next League fixture was a home match against Tottenham Hotspur. The match saw both Park Ji-sung and Rafael van der Vaart hit the frame of the goal inside the first 11 minutes, but it took half an hour for the first goal to come when Vidić headed in a Nani free-kick from close range. Both teams had further chances to score before Nani did so 5 minutes from time in very unusual and controversial circumstances. Chasing a through-ball, Nani was caught by a Spurs defender and went down looking for a penalty. However, referee Mark Clattenburg declined to give one. In the course of going down, Nani clearly handled the ball and the Spurs goalkeeper, Heurelho Gomes assumed that Clattenburg would give a free kick to his team. For some reason, Clattenburg allowed play to continue without the free kick, but Gomes put the ball down anyway. Nani, who had got back to his feet, simply kicked the ball into the net and Clattenburg awarded the goal. His assistant called him over for a discussion as he had seen the handball, but Clattenburg re-iterated the decision to give the goal and the match ultimately ended 2–0. Technically, the goal was correct as the referee never awarded Spurs a free-kick for the Nani handball.

Returning to the League after midweek victory in Europe, United faced Wolverhampton Wanderers at Old Trafford. This was the second meeting between the two teams in 12 days after United overcame Wolves 3–2 in the League Cup. United struggled to gain a grip on the game in the first half but were the first to break the deadlock right on the stroke of time, Darren Fletcher bisecting the Wolves defence with a pass to Park Ji-sung, who converted the chance. Wolves made changes in the second half, bringing on Sylvan Ebanks-Blake and Steven Fletcher, and it was the former United youth team player Ebanks-Blake who equalised, slotting the ball through the legs of Edwin van der Sar from close range. United pressed for a winner in the final minutes of the game, introducing Federico Macheda and Paul Scholes into the game, and it paid dividends in the 93rd minute as Fletcher played a diagonal ball to Park, who drifted infield and squeezed the ball past Marcus Hahnemann for his second of the game, giving United the 2–1 victory. The game also marked the comeback of Owen Hargreaves, making his first start in nearly two years. The comeback was truncated, however, as he limped off the field after 5 minutes due to a hamstring injury.

United played against crosstown rivals Manchester City at Eastlands on 10 November 2010, the first Manchester derby of the season. The game was deadlocked at 0–0 at half-time, after Edwin van der Sar had saved Carlos Tevez's free-kick and Dimitar Berbatov had tested Joe Hart with an overhead kick. Near the end of the game, Adam Johnson and Javier Hernández were respectively brought on for James Milner and Berbatov, but neither team found a winner and the game ended 0–0.

United played out a 2–2 draw against Aston Villa at Villa Park three days later. The game was 0–0 at half-time, and was still goalless until Wes Brown fouled Ashley Young within the penalty area. Young himself converted the penalty, and Marc Albrighton doubled the home side's lead, slotting home Stewart Downing's cross. Alex Ferguson then took off Dimitar Berbatov and Javier Hernández and respectively replaced them with Gabriel Obertan and Federico Macheda in an attempt to equalise. Macheda then drilled in an 18-yard shot to give United some hope, and team captain Nemanja Vidić equalised, when he met a Nani cross at the far post and nodded the ball home. United held on for the draw.

United recorded a 2–0 victory over Wigan Athletic on 20 November 2010. Patrice Evra opened the scoring just before half time when he headed in Park Ji-sung's cross. Within two minutes in the second half, Wigan were down to ten and then nine men when captain Antolín Alcaraz was sent off for pick up a second yellow card. Minutes later, stand-in captain Hugo Rodallega was also shown red, a straight red card for challenging Rafael. Rafael assisted in Javier Hernández's winning goal, when the Brazilian sent in a cross for the Mexican to head home. This game saw the return of Wayne Rooney to the team after a five-week injury, which he picked up just before signing his new five-year contract with the Red Devils. Rooney came on a substitute in the 56th minute, replacing Federico Macheda.

Returning to league action after a midweek victory over Rangers, United recorded a 7–1 thrashing of Blackburn Rovers. United went 1–0 up after just two minutes, when Nani's free kick was met with a very faint headed flick from Wayne Rooney (making his first Old Trafford start since signing his new five-year contract). Dimitar Berbatov then struck out his leg to finish from six yards, the goal being Berbatov's first goal in ten matches. Nani then fed Park Ji-sung, who played a one-two with Rooney before running on and poking past Blackburn goalkeeper Paul Robinson for United's second goal of the game. United went 3–0 up when Berbatov intercepted a Pascal Chimbonda back-pass to Robinson, allowing him to score his second goal of the game. Two minutes into the second half, Berbatov got his third, when Nani sped down the right then cut inside and laid the ball back to Berbatov, who began the move he started inside his own half with an effort high into Robinson's net. A minute later, Nani added to Blackburn's misery when he grabbed his first goal of the game, when he cut inside Chimbonda to place his effort past Robinson. Berbatov got his fourth goal of the game, and United's sixth, when Rafael raced into the penalty area before playing in Park, whose effort was blocked by Blackburn captain Christopher Samba only for Berbatov to smash home. Berbatov got his fifth goal of the game (becoming only the fourth player to score five goals in a Premier League game, after Andy Cole, Alan Shearer and Jermain Defoe), when he slid in from an angle after his attempt to square the ball to Rooney was thwarted. Samba grabbed a consolation eight minutes from time, when he nodded in a cross from substitute Josh Morris. The win put United to the top of the 2010–11 Premier League table for the first time.

United's next scheduled League game was away to Blackpool on 4 December, but due to a frozen pitch following heavy snowfall around the United Kingdom, the game was cancelled 24 hours before kick-off and was re-arranged to the 25 January. As such, United did not play in the league for two weeks, during which time they were overtaken at the top of the table by Arsenal and local rivals Manchester City, albeit with games in hand over their near title rivals.

The next League game United actually played was the home tie with Arsenal, traditional title rivals and who started the match top of the League. United started strongly, though rarely tested young Arsenal keeper Wojciech Szczęsny until a looping header from Park Ji-sung hit the far post and went in five minutes before half time. Arsenal came out quicker in the second half and Edwin van der Sar was forced into a save from Samir Nasri before Nemanja Vidić blocked the rebound shot from Marouane Chamakh. However United got into their stride and Anderson brought a save from Szczęsny before Nani fired over from a good position. A penalty was awarded for a handball by Gaël Clichy with 15 minutes to go, only for Wayne Rooney to hit it well over the crossbar. Rooney attempted to make amends a few minutes later with an attempted lob over Szczęsny, but it was well saved and a last minute miss from Theo Walcott assured three points and a return to top spot for United with still a game in hand over the teams below them.

United's next scheduled League game was away to rivals Chelsea on 19 December, but – following heavy snowfall around the UK, including up to 10 inches in London – the match was cancelled 24 hours before kick-off after consultation with the Police and the local authority. It was later re-arranged to 1 March. Coupled with the cancellation of Arsenal's game with Stoke and Manchester City's defeat at home to Everton, this meant that United topped the League table on Christmas Day for the first time in four seasons.

The next league game that United actually played was a home fixture against Sunderland. Dimitar Berbatov opened the scoring after just five minutes, when he headed home Wayne Rooney's cross. After that, Berbatov hit the post and Anderson's shot crashed off the crossbar as United created numerous chances. after the break Anton Ferdinand, Rio Ferdinand's younger brother, deflected a Berbatov kick into his own net and wrap up the 2–0 win for United.

United finished 2010 with a 1–1 draw against Birmingham City at St Andrews. The draw moved United back to the top of the league, as United's rivals Manchester City had beaten Birmingham's rivals Aston Villa to put the Sky Blues to the top of the table. After a goalless first half, United took the lead in the 58th minute, when Dimitar Berbatov released Darron Gibson with a flick and then took the return pass to drive a shot inside the post. An 18-yard Berbatov strike also hit the post before the late drama. Birmingham got a last-gasp, but controversial, equaliser in the 89th minute, when a Blues cross appeared to hit Nikola Žigić's arm and Lee Bowyer slid the ball home despite appearing to be offside. After the four minutes of stoppage time were up, United moved back to first place.

Following the game against Birmingham City, United started 2011 with another visit to the Midlands, this time to The Hawthorns to face West Bromwich Albion. Wayne Rooney opened the scoring with just three minutes played when he headed home his first goal in open play since March 2010. James Morrison levelled for the Baggies with a strike from 20 yards. Peter Odemwingie then missed from the spot after defender Rio Ferdinand had brought down Jerome Thomas. Javier Hernández and Darron Gibson respectively came on for Dimitar Berbatov and Gabriel Obertan, and Hernández won the game for United in the 73rd minute, heading home Rooney's corner.

United extended their lead at the top of the League after a vital, hard-fought victory over Stoke at Old Trafford. Dimitar Berbatov went close before United went ahead when Javier Hernández back-healed the ball into the net from Nani's cross; Hernández's goal meant he had now scored three times against Stoke. Dean Whitehead nodded the Potters level, their first League goal at Old Trafford for more than 30 years, but Hernández and Nani combined once again as Hernández teed up Nani to blast home a left-footed winner. The win put United two points clear of neighbours Manchester City, who they had two games in hand over, and four ahead of Arsenal, who they had one game in hand over.

United extended their unbeaten record in the league to 26 games and returned to the top of the table with an important draw against Tottenham Hotspur at White Hart Lane. United were forced to play the last 16 minutes without young Brazilian defender Rafael, who received a second yellow card for a foul on Benoît Assou-Ekotto, but Spurs were unable to muster much in the way of attacking threat. United moved back ahead of arch-rivals Manchester City on goal difference but crucially had two games in hand over their local rivals.

United's next game was a home game against Birmingham City, which United won 5–0. Dimitar Berbatov nodded in on the line after 95 seconds to open the scoring before firing home after Roger Johnson had given the ball away. With Ryan Giggs lifting the unbeaten league leaders to heights they had rarely hit this season, the veteran finished off a move just before the break. Berbatov then converted a Giggs cross for his third before Nani slotted in a fifth to finish the scoring.

The following game was the rescheduled fixture from December as United took on Blackpool at Bloomfield Road, staging a comeback to win 3–2. Blackpool dominated the first half, scoring twice from Charlie Adam-delivered corners with headers from former United reserve captain Craig Cathcart and D. J. Campbell. However, at half time United introduced Ryan Giggs in favour of Darron Gibson and followed that with Javier Hernández replacing Wayne Rooney. United pulled one back after Dimitar Berbatov converted a low Darren Fletcher cross, and mere minutes later, Giggs released Hernández, who converted past Richard Kingson to draw things level. After an extended break following an injury to Rafael (leading to ten minutes of additional time) Berbatov scored his second goal of the game, thrashing home with his left foot to complete the comeback.

In the next game, United equalled the club record league unbeaten run of 29 games with a 3–1 home win over Aston Villa. Sir Alex Ferguson's decision to name Wayne Rooney in the starting line-up ahead of Javier Hernández was justified after just 54 seconds of the match, with Rooney controlling Edwin van der Sar's long free-kick coming over his shoulder, before lashing home past Brad Friedel. Rooney scored his second of the match and fourth league goal of the season in first-half stoppage time, with Nani's inswinging cross finding him at the far post to slot in from close range. Darren Bent pulled a goal back for Villa in the 58th minute, but five minutes later United's two-goal lead was restored when Nemanja Vidić scored United's third goal; curling in a Rooney lay-off from just inside the box.

The day after the Villa match, Gary Neville decided to retire. At the time he was United's fifth highest appearance maker, having played 602 times since making his debut against Torpedo Moscow in 1992. He played his last match for the club in the 2–1 victory away at West Brom on New Year's Day. As soon as the announcement was made, tributes flooded in from supporters, United players past and present, the media and his manager Sir Alex Ferguson.

On 5 February, United suffered their first league defeat of the season, a 2–1 loss to Wolverhampton Wanderers at Molineux. United led after three minutes as Nani drilled home inside the near post after turning George Elokobi inside-out. But Elokobi headed in soon after with United's defence sleeping, Matt Jarvis executing a short-corner routine. Kevin Doyle then glanced in just before the break, after which the visitors failed to carve out any clear chances. Although United had many chances in the second half, they failed to beat Wolves, and thus crashed to their first league loss of the season.

United recovered from the disastrous loss at Wolves to win 2–1 in the Manchester derby against Manchester City at Old Trafford on 12 February. Nani collected a pass from Ryan Giggs before slotting home from 15 yards to put United ahead just before the break. David Silva, who side-footed wide from an acute angle in the first half, was oblivious as Edin Džeko's shot cannoned off his backside to level for City. But Wayne Rooney won it with an overhead kick that flew into the top corner.

Manchester United took the short trip to the DW Stadium to face Wigan Athletic on 26 February. United won 4–0 to restore their lead at the top of the Premier League table to four points, after Arsenal beat Stoke 1–0 three days earlier. Relegation-threatened Wigan shone early on but Edwin van der Sar stood solid. Javier Hernández cleverly clipped in rampant Nani's cross after 17 minutes as the visitors gradually took control. Hernández slotted a cool second 15 minutes from time before a Wayne Rooney tap-in and substitute Fabio's simple shot added a late gloss.

United's next game was the postponed game from 19 December 2010, the away game against Chelsea. The match was played on 1 March, and Frank Lampard's disputed penalty condemned United to only their third defeat in the 2010–11 season (all competitions). United deservedly led at half-time as a fierce 25-yard strike from Wayne Rooney – who Sir Alex Ferguson admitted was fortunate to be playing after escaping further punishment for elbowing Wigan's James McCarthy on 26 February – gave United the lead. The lead was cancelled out when David Luiz scored his first Chelsea goal, volleying home after Branislav Ivanović's flick-on. Lampard converted a penalty in the 79th minute to dent United's hopes of regaining the Premier League from Chelsea, after Chris Smalling fouled Chelsea sub Yuri Zhirkov. United's misery was compounded in stoppage time after captain Nemanja Vidić was sent off for picking up a second yellow card, ruling the Serbian international out of United's testing trip to face Liverpool on 6 March.

United's title hopes were dented further as they were defeated 3–1 by Liverpool at Anfield. Dirk Kuyt opened the scoring, after he was teed up by Luis Suárez. The Dutch striker then took advantage of Nani's poor defensive header to make it 2–0. Nani was taken off after a high tackle by Jamie Carragher as the game threatened to erupt before half-time. Kuyt then sealed it to complete his first Liverpool hat-trick, after Edwin van der Sar fumbled Suárez's free-kick. Javier Hernández nodded home Ryan Giggs' cross in stoppage time, but the goal was no more than a consolation. This was the first time since 2009 that United lost two consecutive league matches.

On 19 March, United returned to winning ways with a 1–0 win over Bolton at Old Trafford. The only goal was scored two minutes from time by Dimitar Berbatov, his first goal for United since the Red Devils' 3–2 victory over Blackpool on 25 January, when he scored twice. In a first half of few chances, Javier Hernández shot wide and Martin Petrov hit a free-kick at Edwin van der Sar. United defender Jonny Evans was shown a straight red card in the second half for a lunge on Stuart Holden. But Berbatov gave United the points by bundling home after Jussi Jääskeläinen failed to hold Nani's shot. Coupled with Arsenal's 2–2 draw with West Brom, this meant that United moved five points clear at the top of the table.

United's next game was at struggling West Ham, the lunchtime kickoff on 2 April. United were 2–0 down at the break, with Mark Noble scoring two penalties for the Hammers: the first in the 11th minute after a handball by Patrice Evra, and then 14 minutes later, after the returning Nemanja Vidić had fouled Carlton Cole. Vidić escaped a red card for a foul on Demba Ba before Wayne Rooney curled in a second-half free-kick and then a few minutes later powered in a low shot to equalise. A Rooney penalty – for a handball – completed the England striker's hat-trick and put the visitors ahead, before Javier Hernández poked in a fourth to win the match 4–2. Arsenal again failed to win – this time a 0–0 draw at home to Blackburn – leaving them seven points behind United, albeit with a game in hand. Wayne Rooney was later charged by The Football Association for using offensive, insulting and/or abusive language directly into a camera following his third goal – the match being screened live on Sky Sports in the UK and Ireland, as well as elsewhere around the world. He was given a two match suspension, ruling him out of United's next League game against Fulham on 9 April as well as the FA Cup semi-final against Manchester City on 16 April.

United hosted Fulham in their next game, with the Red Devils knowing that a victory would put them 10 points clear of second-placed Arsenal, who were not to play until the following day. And a victory was what United got, with goals from Dimitar Berbatov and Antonio Valencia giving them a 2–0 victory. The recalled Berbatov opened the scoring with a first-time finish after Nani played him in. Aaron Hughes then cleared a Nani cross into the path of Valencia, who headed home United's second. Tomasz Kuszczak made a save from Fulham substitute Eiður Guðjohnsen after the break, while Mark Schwarzer stopped a strike from Darron Gibson.

On 19 April, United missed the chance to go nine points clear at the top of the table, dropping two points after a frustrating display away to Newcastle United. The visitors were guilty of poor passing throughout, though Wayne Rooney and Ryan Giggs missed good chances. Striker Javier Hernández felt he was fouled in the box by Danny Simpson late on, only to be booked for a dive. Newcastle deserved a point though, and could have had a penalty of their own when Anderson felled Peter Løvenkrands.

United did go nine points clear at the top of the table, albeit briefly, in the lunchtime kickoff on 23 April, beating Everton 1–0 at Old Trafford. The only goal of the game was scored exactly seven minutes from time, when Javier Hernández headed home Antonio Valencia's cross after Sylvain Distin gave the ball away. Hernández earlier forced two good saves from Tim Howard, while Everton's Victor Anichebe could have had a penalty. But after a spate of Howard saves, United's pressure eventually paid off.

United's next game was on the following Sunday, away to Arsenal. Arsenal's title hopes were all but over thanks to their 2–1 defeat by Bolton on 24 April, while United needed the win to go six points clear, after Chelsea defeated Tottenham with two controversial goals the previous day. The game was 0–0 at half-time, and Arsenal could have had a penalty when Nemanja Vidić handled Theo Walcott's cross in the box, but referee Chris Foy waved away Arsenal's penalty cries. However, Arsenal gave their London rivals a massive favour by going ahead in the 56th minute, Aaron Ramsey sliding into the corner after Robin van Persie's cut-back to give Arsenal a lead that they somewhat deserved. United should have had a penalty with three minutes to go when substitute Michael Owen was brought down by Gaël Clichy, but Foy waved away United's shouts and the final score was 1–0 to Arsenal. This meant that United were now only three points ahead of Chelsea in the title race with the same goal difference (+38), with the two meeting on 8 May at Old Trafford in what was both sides' next league game.

United went on to win this game 2–1, putting in a great performance. United were superb in the first 45 minutes and made a perfect start when Javier Hernández scored the 20th goal of his debut season after just 36 seconds, slotting home past Petr Čech from Park Ji-sung's through-ball. United continued to dominate and after 23 minutes, Nemanja Vidić headed in Ryan Giggs' cross from a short corner. Frank Lampard gave Chelsea hope with a poacher's goal against the run of play, but Alex denied United a third when he brilliantly blocked Wayne Rooney's shot from close range. Hernández could also have made things safe in the closing stages but twice spurned good chances, heading over from Antonio Valencia's fine cross and scuffing a shot late on. United still held on for the win. The result meant that United needed only one point from either of their two remaining games to secure a record 19th title.

On 14 May 2011, United secured that point and their 19th league title away to Blackburn, after a 1–1 draw. United started quickly and could have gone in front after just four minutes when Nani headed against the crossbar, but Blackburn came back into the game. Tomasz Kuszczak, in goal for United had a number of nervy moments in the first half, which appeared to give Blackburn confidence and they scored after 20 minutes via a low shot from Brett Emerton. United held on until half time and arguably had the better of the second half. The equaliser came after 73 minutes when Javier Hernández was brought down by Rovers goalkeeper Paul Robinson and Wayne Rooney dispatched the resultant penalty. The final few minutes were a drab affair as neither team wanted to risk losing the one point that they would gain from the draw. When the final whistle went, United were officially crowned champions of English football for a record breaking 19th time. The trophy was presented after their final league game of the season, at home to Blackpool on 22 May.

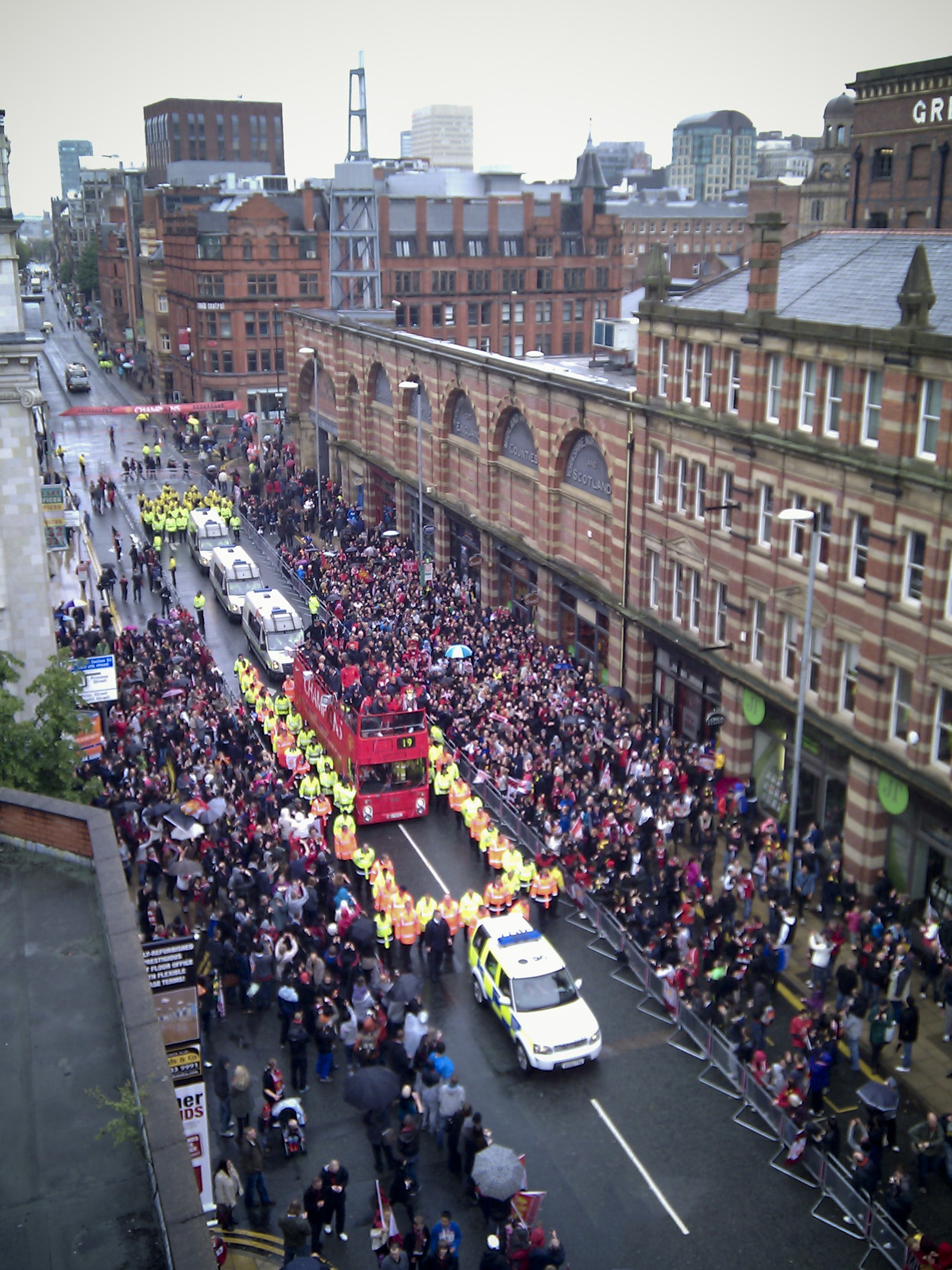
The team paraded the Premier League trophy on an open-top bus tour through Manchester city centre on 30 May 2011.

United came from behind to win the Blackpool game 4–2, condemning the Seasiders to relegation. United opened the scoring on 21 minutes, when Park Ji-sung was released in the area by Dimitar Berbatov. Park evaded the challenge of Ian Evatt and lifted the ball over Matthew Gilks to put United in front. United had two penalty claims wrongly turned down by referee Mike Dean, before, on 39 minutes, Dean dubiously awarded a free-kick to Blackpool. Charlie Adam curled home the set-piece past captain-for-the-day Edwin van der Sar (with United's 40-year-old goalkeeper playing his last league game for the Reds before retirement), making Adam the first player to score against United at Old Trafford in the first half of a match all season, and the first since Joe Cole did so for Chelsea on 3 April 2010. Eleven minutes into the second half, Blackpool stunned the home support by taking a shock lead. David Vaughan found space on the right side of United's area before setting up Gary Taylor-Fletcher, whose scrappy goal curled off the post to send all but the travelling supporters in Old Trafford silent. Their celebrations were short-lived, as United gained a somewhat deserved equaliser five minutes later, when Park's cross was swept high past Gilks by Anderson. Immediately after the equaliser, Sir Alex Ferguson brought Michael Owen into the action, replacing Park. United dominated the game after that leveller, with Gilks saving acrobatically from Berbatov and Nani somehow heading Chris Smalling's cross wide with the goal at his mercy. With 16 minutes to go, United's efforts were rewarded when Evatt diverted Smalling's right-wing cross into his own net. With nine minutes to go, Owen killed off the game and confirmed Blackpool's relegation with a poacher's finish, racing through from Anderson's pass and beating Gilks with ease. Blackpool almost scored a consolation goal deep into stoppage time, with substitute Luke Varney hitting the bar with a header from a corner.

Date	Opponents	H / A	Result F–A	Scorers	Attendance	League position
16 August 2010	Newcastle United	H	3–0	Berbatov 33', Fletcher 41', Giggs 85'	75,221	4th
22 August 2010	Fulham	A	2–2	Scholes 11', Hangeland 84' (o.g.)	25,643	3rd
28 August 2010	West Ham United	H	3–0	Rooney 33' (pen.), Nani 50', Berbatov 69'	75,061	3rd
11 September 2010	Everton	A	3–3	Fletcher 43', Vidić 47', Berbatov 66'	36,556	3rd
19 September 2010	Liverpool	H	3–2	Berbatov (3) 42', 59', 84'	75,213	3rd
26 September 2010	Bolton Wanderers	A	2–2	Nani 23', Owen 74'	23,926	2nd
2 October 2010	Sunderland	A	0–0		41,709	3rd
16 October 2010	West Bromwich Albion	H	2–2	Hernández 5', Nani 25'	75,272	3rd
24 October 2010	Stoke City	A	2–1	Hernández (2) 27', 86'	27,372	3rd
30 October 2010	Tottenham Hotspur	H	2–0	Vidić 31', Nani 84'	75,223	3rd
6 November 2010	Wolverhampton Wanderers	H	2–1	Park (2) 45', 90+3'	75,285	2nd
10 November 2010	Manchester City	A	0–0		47,679	2nd
13 November 2010	Aston Villa	A	2–2	Macheda 81', Vidić 85'	40,073	3rd
20 November 2010	Wigan Athletic	H	2–0	Evra 45+1', Hernández 77'	74,181	2nd
27 November 2010	Blackburn Rovers	H	7–1	Berbatov (5) 2', 27', 47', 62', 70', Park 23', Nani 48'	74,850	1st
13 December 2010	Arsenal	H	1–0	Park 41'	75,227	1st
26 December 2010	Sunderland	H	2–0	Berbatov 5', A. Ferdinand 57' (o.g.)	75,269	1st
28 December 2010	Birmingham City	A	1–1	Berbatov 58'	28,242	1st
1 January 2011	West Bromwich Albion	A	2–1	Rooney 3', Hernández 75'	25,499	1st
4 January 2011	Stoke City	H	2–1	Hernández 27', Nani 62'	73,401	1st
16 January 2011	Tottenham Hotspur	A	0–0		35,828	1st
22 January 2011	Birmingham City	H	5–0	Berbatov (3) 2', 31', 53', Giggs 45+2', Nani 76'	75,326	1st
25 January 2011	Blackpool	A	3–2	Berbatov (2) 72', 88', Hernández 74'	15,574	1st
1 February 2011	Aston Villa	H	3–1	Rooney (2) 1', 45+1', Vidić 63'	75,256	1st
5 February 2011	Wolverhampton Wanderers	A	1–2	Nani 3'	28,811	1st
12 February 2011	Manchester City	H	2–1	Nani 41', Rooney 78'	75,322	1st
26 February 2011	Wigan Athletic	A	4–0	Hernández (2) 17', 74', Rooney 84', Fabio 87'	18,140	1st
1 March 2011	Chelsea	A	1–2	Rooney 29'	41,825	1st
6 March 2011	Liverpool	A	1–3	Hernández 90+2'	44,753	1st
19 March 2011	Bolton Wanderers	H	1–0	Berbatov 88'	75,486	1st
2 April 2011	West Ham United	A	4–2	Rooney (3) 65', 73', 79' (pen.), Hernández 84'	34,546	1st
9 April 2011	Fulham	H	2–0	Berbatov 12', Valencia 32'	75,339	1st
19 April 2011	Newcastle United	A	0–0		49,025	1st
23 April 2011	Everton	H	1–0	Hernández 84'	75,300	1st
1 May 2011	Arsenal	A	0–1		60,107	1st
8 May 2011	Chelsea	H	2–1	Hernández 1', Vidić 23'	75,445	1st
14 May 2011	Blackburn Rovers	A	1–1	Rooney 73' (pen.)	29,867	1st
22 May 2011	Blackpool	H	4–2	Park 21', Anderson 62', Evatt 74' (o.g.), Owen 81'	75,400	1st

Pos	Team	Pld	W	D	L	GF	GA	GD	Pts	Qualification or relegation
1	Manchester United (C)	38	23	11	4	78	37	+41	80	Qualification for the Champions League group stage
2	Chelsea	38	21	8	9	69	33	+36	71	Qualification for the Champions League group stage
3	Manchester City	38	21	8	9	60	33	+27	71	Qualification for the Champions League group stage
4	Arsenal	38	19	11	8	72	43	+29	68	Qualification for the Champions League play-off round
5	Tottenham Hotspur	38	16	14	8	55	46	+9	62	Qualification for the Europa League play-off round

Source: Barclays Premier League
Rules for classification: 1) points; 2) goal difference; 3) number of goals scored.
(C) Champions

== FA Cup ==
Manchester United entered the FA Cup at the third round stage, the draw being made on 28 November 2010. For the second season in a row they began the competition by facing a fierce rival at Old Trafford, with Liverpool being their opponents on this occasion. The match was played at lunch-time on 9 January 2011.

It was the first time in nearly five years that the two sides have met in the FA Cup, following a 1–0 defeat at Anfield in 2006, with this being the first tie at Old Trafford for nearly twelve years. On that occasion two goals in the last two minutes from Dwight Yorke and Ole Gunnar Solskjær sent United to a 2–1 victory, having been trailing for over 85 minutes to a goal by now United player Michael Owen. United went on to win the Treble.

This time, the early goal came for United after Dimitar Berbatov was fouled in the penalty area by Daniel Agger after just 31 seconds and Ryan Giggs scored the resultant penalty. Then, after around half an hour, Steven Gerrard was given a straight red card by referee, Howard Webb for a two-footed tackle on Michael Carrick. Despite the numerical advantage, United couldn't increase their advantage, but Liverpool also failed to score and United won 1–0.

The draw for the fourth round was made directly after the Liverpool match, and gave United a trip to the south coast to play League One side Southampton. United have won the previous five meetings between the two sides, but did famously lose the 1976 FA Cup Final to the same opponents.

The match took place on 29 January, and was broadcast live on ITV1. United won 2–1. Michael Owen hit the post with a cross before League One side Southampton shocked the Premier League leaders when Richard Chaplow crashed home a fierce drive. The lead was cancelled out when Owen nodded in from close range. Then Javier Hernández finished clinically after being put in by Ryan Giggs to complete United's comeback.

The draw for the fifth round was made on 30 January, and gave United a home tie against non-League side Crawley Town, of the Blue Square Bet Premier Division. The match was played on 19 February. United had never previously met Crawley, however they were held to a 0–0 draw away to Burton Albion in the third round five seasons ago, before winning the replay 5–0 at Old Trafford. This was their most recent meeting with a team from this level.

United have not lost to non-League opposition since before the First World War, when Swindon Town beat them 1–0 in the first round at the County Ground on 10 January 1914. Swindon went on to be crowned Southern League champions the same season.

United edged a 1–0 win thanks to a rare Wes Brown goal in the 28th minute, only his fifth for United in his 358th match. United were given a late scare when Richard Brodie's header hit the crossbar in stoppage time, but they held on to clinch a place in the sixth round.

The sixth round draw was made on 20 February, and gave United their third home tie of this season's competition. They were drawn to play either League One side Leyton Orient, or title rivals Arsenal. Immediately after the draw was made, Leyton Orient and Arsenal played out a 1–1 draw at Brisbane Road in their fifth-round match. Jonathan Téhoué scored an 89th-minute equaliser for Leyton Orient to secure a replay at the Emirates Stadium, which was played on 2 March, and ended in a 5–0 victory for Arsenal.

The match was played on 12 March and saw United pick a seemingly bizarre starting lineup, as seven of their starting eleven were defenders, with twin brothers Fabio and Rafael starting as wingers, while John O'Shea played as a defensive midfielder. United ran out 2–0 winners thanks to goals from Fabio and Wayne Rooney in the 28th and 49th minutes respectively. It could easily have been more with chances for Rooney, Hernández and Giggs not finding the net. The result meant that Arsenal had been eliminated from three major competitions in the space of a fortnight. The match also saw the return of Antonio Valencia after a six-month absence due to a broken ankle. He replaced Fabio at half-time.

The draw for the semi-finals was made on 13 March, and gave United a tie against local rivals Manchester City or Championship side Reading, who played their sixth round tie at Eastlands immediately after the draw. City won 1–0 thanks to a 74th minute Micah Richards goal to set up a 159th meeting with United, and the first ever at Wembley. The two sides had met in the semi-finals before on just one occasion 85 years previously, when City won 3–0 at Bramall Lane.

The match was played on 16 April 2011, and City won 1–0 thanks to a 52nd minute Yaya Touré goal, scored after Michael Carrick gave the ball away. 20 minutes later Paul Scholes was sent off for a high challenge on Pablo Zabaleta, which gave him an automatic three match suspension.

Date	Round	Opponents	H / A	Result F–A	Scorers	Attendance
9 January 2011	Round 3	Liverpool	H	1–0	Giggs 2' (pen.)	74,727
29 January 2011	Round 4	Southampton	A	2–1	Owen 65', Hernández 75'	28,792
19 February 2011	Round 5	Crawley Town	H	1–0	Brown 28'	74,778
12 March 2011	Round 6	Arsenal	H	2–0	Fabio 28', Rooney 49'	74,693
16 April 2011	Semi-final	Manchester City	N	0–1		86,549

== League Cup ==
As one of the seven Premier League teams involved in European competition in the 2010–11 season, Manchester United received a bye to the third round of the League Cup. The draw for the third round took place on 28 August 2010, and gave Manchester United an away tie against Championship team Scunthorpe United. The match was the first between the two sides.

With Sir Alex Ferguson in Spain watching UEFA Champions League opponents Valencia, Mike Phelan was handed managerial duties for a United team making wholesale changes from their win over Liverpool. The hosts scored a shock opener when Josh Wright powered in, only for Darron Gibson to level with a fine lob. United settled after Chris Smalling's volley before the break with Scunthorpe restricted to long-range shots which were dealt with comfortably by Man of the Match Tomasz Kuszczak. Michael Owen tucked in when clean through, Park Ji-sung blasted home and Owen tapped in the fifth, leaving Martyn Woolford to score a consolation.

The draw for the fourth round took place on 25 September, and gave United a home tie with fellow Premier League club Wolverhampton Wanderers, who they defeated 1–0 in the third round of last season's competition. The match was played on 26 October and United eventually won the game 3–2, though twice threw away a lead. Goals from Bébé (his first for the club), Park Ji-sung and a late winner from Javier Hernández put United through to the fifth round.

The draw for the fifth round was made on 30 October 2010, and handed Manchester United a trip to Upton Park to play against fellow Premier League club West Ham United. The match was played on 30 November but United lost 4–0, their first defeat since April. United almost took the lead 7 minutes in when Gabriel Obertan's shot was cleared onto the post by Robert Green. In the 15th minute, West Ham appeared to have taken the lead when Victor Obinna's shot appeared to have deflected off Chris Smalling, but the referee rightly ruled that it had deflected off United old boy Jonathan Spector and disallowed the "goal" as it was offside. Minutes later Spector, who made eight first-team appearances for United, gave West Ham the lead, when he looped a header over Tomasz Kuszczak from Obinna's clever cross. The goal was Spector's first goal in his entire club career. Spector added on a second eight minutes before half time, when he fired home from close range with both Smalling and Kuszczak unable to stop him. Alex Ferguson brought on Federico Macheda for Bébé at half time in an attempt to score, but West Ham got their third goal eleven minutes into the second half, when Carlton Cole headed from Obinna's cross for his 50th career goal. United were embarrassed further by West Ham in the 66th minute, when Obinna's cross into the middle of the penalty box was well controlled by Cole, who turned Jonny Evans before slotting home. Javier Hernández headed wide a few minutes from time to add to United's misery. West Ham held on to knock the two-time defending champions out of the League Cup, condemn United to their first defeat all season, record their biggest win over United in 80 years, and reach the last four of the League Cup for the first time in 20 years.

Date	Round	Opponents	H / A	Result F–A	Scorers	Attendance
22 September 2010	Round 3	Scunthorpe United	A	5–2	Gibson 23', Smalling 36', Owen (2) 49', 71', Park 54'	9,077
26 October 2010	Round 4	Wolverhampton Wanderers	H	3–2	Bébé 56', Park 70', Hernández 90'	46,083
30 November 2010	Round 5	West Ham United	A	0–4		33,551

== UEFA Champions League ==
=== Group stage ===
Manchester United began their Champions League campaign in the group stage after finishing in second place in the 2009–10 Premier League. The draw for the group stage was made on 26 August 2010. As one of the top eight-ranked teams in Europe, the club was seeded in Pot 1, meaning that they would avoid being drawn with defending champions Internazionale, as well as Barcelona, Bayern Munich, Milan, Lyon and the other three English clubs, Chelsea, Arsenal and Tottenham Hotspur. However, they could still be drawn against former champions Real Madrid and Ajax, and 1966 finalists Partizan. The draw eventually paired United with two previous opponents, Valencia and Scottish champions Rangers, and one new opponent, in the form of Turkish champions Bursaspor.

United's first Champions League fixture of the season came on 14 September, at home to Rangers. With a home league match against Liverpool approaching on the following Sunday, Alex Ferguson took the opportunity to rest several of his first-team players; only Darren Fletcher remained from the team that faced Everton on the previous Saturday. Nevertheless, both Wayne Rooney and Rio Ferdinand returned to the team. Although United had the most shots during the game – most of them long-range efforts from Darron Gibson – they were unable to break down the Rangers defence, and the match finished as a goalless draw. In addition to a sub-par performance, United's misery was compounded by an horrendous injury to Antonio Valencia; in a fair challenge with Rangers' Kirk Broadfoot, the Ecuadorian winger caught his foot in the turf and suffered a dislocated and broken left ankle, with ligament damage. It was expected that Valencia would miss most of the rest of the season. This was confirmed after an operation the morning after the match, with Ferguson stating late February as a possible return date. He eventually made his return on 12 March after a six-month absence as a half-time substitute against Arsenal at Old Trafford in the sixth round of the FA Cup.

United then travelled to La Liga toppers Valencia. Valencia had United under the cosh but some resolute defending and some easy misses meant that United looked like leaving with a credible draw. However, United had other ideas after Nani and Federico Macheda combined well to set up Javier Hernández to score an 85th-minute winner to see United leave Spain with all 3 points and their first victory on the road all season.

Hours after Wayne Rooney's shock revelation he wanted to leave the club, United entertained Turkish champions Bursaspor. It did not take long for United to take the lead – and it came courtesy of a stunning solo effort from Nani who cut in from the left and hit a sweet 20-yard curling shot past the despairing Dimitar Ivankov who had no chance of preventing the goal. Substitute Gabriel Obertan should have doubled United's advantage late on but his header from a corner fell wide, while Javier Hernández was also guilty of lacking the killer instinct when he dragged a shot wide when ideally placed to score. In the end, Nani's early strike proved enough and United topped the Group after three games.

United played Bursaspor again in the next game, this time at the Bursa Atatürk Stadium in Bursa, Turkey. This time the game was more conclusive as United ran out 3–0 winners, with second-half goals from Darren Fletcher, Gabriel Obertan and Bébé. Victory kept United top of the group and needing at least a point from their last two games to qualify for the knockout stages.

The next game was away at Ibrox Stadium against Rangers. Unlike the turgid affair earlier in the season, both teams tried to get the win in this game – indeed Rangers had to win to have any chance of making the Champions League knockout stages. The match was finally settled three minutes from time after Fabio was clumsily kicked in the face by Steven Naismith and Wayne Rooney scored the resulting penalty. The win put United through to the knockout stages and also relegated Rangers to the UEFA Europa League competition. However, a comprehensive victory for Valencia in their fifth group match meant that United still needed at least a point from their final Group match to top the Group.

United got the required point by drawing 1–1 in their last Group match at home to Valencia. After passing up a host of chances, United went behind after a half hour when Pablo Hernández slotted home through the legs of Champions League debutant goalkeeper, Ben Amos – the first (and only) goal United conceded in the group stage. Wayne Rooney had a shot that crashed off the crossbar and Dimitar Berbatov had a goal correctly ruled out for offside before Anderson equalised just after the hour mark, following in a rebound from a Park Ji-sung shot. Valencia pressed for a second goal for a while, but eventually the game degenerated into one of few late chances as both teams seemed happy to take the draw. United topped the group, three points ahead of Valencia.

Date	Opponents	H / A	Result F–A	Scorers	Attendance	Group position
14 September 2010	Rangers	H	0–0		74,408	2nd
29 September 2010	Valencia	A	1–0	Hernández 85'	34,946	1st
20 October 2010	Bursaspor	H	1–0	Nani 7'	72,610	1st
2 November 2010	Bursaspor	A	3–0	Fletcher 48', Obertan 73', Bébé 77'	19,050	1st
24 November 2010	Rangers	A	1–0	Rooney 87' (pen.)	49,764	1st
7 December 2010	Valencia	H	1–1	Anderson 62'	74,513	1st

Team	Pld	W	D	L	GF	GA	GD	Pts
(England) Manchester United	6	4	2	0	7	1	+6	14
(Spain) Valencia	6	3	2	1	15	4	+11	11
(Scotland) Rangers	6	1	3	2	3	6	−3	6
(Turkey) Bursaspor	6	0	1	5	2	16	−14	1

=== Knockout phase ===
The draw for the first knockout round of the Champions League was made in Nyon, Switzerland, on 17 December 2010. United, as group winners, could have faced such teams as Inter Milan and Milan, but were ultimately paired with French champions Marseille, who have former Red Gabriel Heinze in their ranks. United's only previous meeting with Marseille came when they were defending the European Cup they had won in 1999. On that occasion in the First Group Stage, United won 2–1 at Old Trafford, before losing 1–0 in France.

United travelled to the Stade Vélodrome and played the first leg on 23 February. The game ended 0–0, leaving United's hopes of progressing to the quarter-finals of the UEFA Champions League hanging on a thread. Darren Fletcher had United's best chance but his 18-yard shot was gathered at the second attempt by the home side's goalkeeper Steve Mandanda. It was a rare opening in a tight game of few chances. Marseille's André Ayew dragged a shot across goal in the main threat to United at the Stade Vélodrome.

The second leg at Old Trafford was held on 15 March, and United won 2–1. Wayne Rooney passed superbly to Ryan Giggs before firing across goal for Javier Hernández to tuck in the opener. André-Pierre Gignac side-footed over soon after and Souleymane Diawara missed a header from six yards out. Hernández then made it 2–0 with another close shot but a Wes Brown own goal from a corner ensured a tense finish.

The draw for the remainder of the tournament took place at 11:00 GMT on 18 March. United could have faced any of the following seven clubs in the quarter-finals: Barcelona, Chelsea, defending champions Inter Milan, Real Madrid, Schalke 04, Shakhtar Donetsk or Tottenham Hotspur. Of these clubs, only Schalke and Shakhtar Donetsk had never met United in European competition. The draw paired United with domestic opposition in the form of Chelsea, who they defeated 6–5 on penalties after a 1–1 draw in the 2008 final, to record the most recent of their three European Cup triumphs. The winner of this tie was drawn to face either Schalke 04 or Inter Milan in the semi-finals.

The first leg was played at Stamford Bridge on 6 April, and United won 1–0 after Wayne Rooney scored following some great work by Michael Carrick and Ryan Giggs after 24 minutes. Chelsea were aggrieved late on after Patrice Evra seemed to have fouled Ramires in United's penalty area, but no penalty was awarded and later striker Fernando Torres was booked for diving, following another tumble in the penalty area after a challenge from Antonio Valencia, but United held on for their first victory at Stamford Bridge in almost nine years and therefore take a lead and an away goal into the second leg.

The second leg was also won by United, this time recording a 2–1 victory. Javier Hernández scored a tap in to make it 1–0, and in the second half Ramires was sent off for his second bookable offence. Didier Drogba then grabbed one back, but within a minute Park Ji-sung had also put the ball into the back of the net and made the score 2–1 on the night. United held on to win 3–1 on aggregate and went through to face Schalke 04 in the semi-finals. The Bundesliga club qualified 24 hours after United by securing a 2–1 home win, which sealed an emphatic 7–3 aggregate victory over holders Inter Milan. The semi-final was the first occasion the two clubs had met.

United travelled to the Veltins-Arena, and played the first leg on 26 April. United won 2–0, taking a huge step towards their third Champions League final in four seasons. United could have been well ahead in the semi-final first leg by half-time, denied only by a series of saves from Germany keeper Manuel Neuer, who has also been a transfer target for the Reds. They broke the deadlock when Wayne Rooney slipped in Ryan Giggs to slot home and Rooney doubled the advantage by firing in a Javier Hernández pass. Edwin van der Sar saved from Sergio Escudero, but Schalke were well below par.

The return leg was held on 4 May at Old Trafford and United ran out comfortable winners. Despite playing a so-called weakened side, Sir Alex Fergusons' side were too good for Schalke. Antonio Valencia scored after 26 minutes to give United the lead on the night before Darron Gibson's shot was fumbled by Manuel Neuer five minutes later. Schalke threatened a comeback when José Manuel Jurado scored from distance after 35 minutes, but they failed to trouble Edwin van der Sar again throughout the first half. Two goals in four minutes from Anderson – whose total for United prior to the game was just two in 127 games – gave United a comfortable 4–1 lead on the night, 6–1 on aggregate. Klaas-Jan Huntelaar had a goal disallowed for offside late on (as Chris Smalling had earlier in the second half) and the remainder of the game remained scoreless, putting United into the final; their third final in four years.

The final was a rematch with Spanish champions Barcelona, their opponents in the 2009 final, which Barcelona comfortably won 2–0. The final – being played at Wembley – held significance for both clubs, with the stadium being the site of their first European Cup triumphs, in 1968 for United and 1992 for Barcelona. Both clubs went into the match having won their respective domestic League titles for the 2010–11 season.

The final was played on 28 May at Wembley, where United lost 3–1. Pedro opened the scoring on 27 minutes when he slipped a finish inside Edwin van der Sar's post, but United equalised seven minutes later, when Wayne Rooney curled a 15-yard shot into Víctor Valdés' top corner. Seven minutes after the interval, however, Barça regained the lead when Lionel Messi unleashed a low, dipping shot that squeezed under Van der Sar's arm. It was Messi's first goal on English soil. With 21 minutes remaining, the game was killed off when Nani gave the ball away to Messi, who teed-up David Villa to curl a fantastic shot into Van der Sar's top corner.

Date	Round	Opponents	H / A	Result F–A	Scorers	Attendance
23 February 2011	First knockout round First leg	Marseille	A	0–0		57,957
15 March 2011	First knockout round Second leg	Marseille	H	2–1	Hernández (2) 5', 75'	73,996
6 April 2011	Quarter-final; First leg	Chelsea	A	1–0	Rooney 24'	37,915
12 April 2011	Quarter-final; Second leg	Chelsea	H	2–1	Hernández 43', Park 77'	74,672
26 April 2011	Semi-final; First leg	Schalke 04	A	2–0	Giggs 67', Rooney 69'	54,142
4 May 2011	Semi-final; Second leg	Schalke 04	H	4–1	Valencia 26', Gibson 31', Anderson (2) 72', 76'	74,687
28 May 2011	Final	Barcelona	N	1–3	Rooney 34'	87,695

== Squad statistics ==
No.	Pos.	Name	League		FA Cup		League Cup		Europe		Other		Total		Discipline	
No.	Pos.	Name	Apps	Goals	Apps	Goals	Apps	Goals	Apps	Goals	Apps	Goals	Apps	Goals	Yellow card	Red card
1	GK	(Netherlands) Edwin van der Sar	33	0	2	0	0	0	10	0	1	0	46	0	2	0
2	DF	(England) Gary Neville	3	0	0	0	0(1)	0	0	0	0	0	3(1)	0	1	0
3	DF	(France) Patrice Evra	34(1)	1	3	0	0	0	9(1)	0	0	0	46(2)	1	2	0
4	MF	(England) Owen Hargreaves	1	0	0	0	0	0	0	0	0	0	1	0	0	0
5	DF	(England) Rio Ferdinand	19	0	2	0	1	0	7	0	0	0	29	0	0	0
6	DF	(England) Wes Brown	4(3)	0	2(1)	1	2(1)	0	2	0	0	0	10(5)	1	3	0
7	FW	(England) Michael Owen	1(10)	2	1(1)	1	1	2	0(2)	0	1	0	4(13)	5	1	0
8	MF	(Brazil) Anderson	14(4)	1	2(2)	0	2	0	4(2)	3	0	0	22(8)	4	5	0
9	FW	(Bulgaria) Dimitar Berbatov	24(8)	20	2	0	0	0	6(1)	0	0(1)	1	32(10)	21	1	0
10	FW	(England) Wayne Rooney	25(3)	11	1(1)	1	0	0	9	4	1	0	36(4)	16	6	0
11	MF	(Wales) Ryan Giggs	19(6)	2	1(2)	1	1	0	6(2)	1	0(1)	0	27(11)	4	6	0
12	DF	(England) Chris Smalling	11(5)	0	2(2)	0	3	1	7(2)	0	0(1)	0	23(10)	1	0	0
13	MF	(South Korea) Park Ji-sung	13(2)	5	1	0	2	2	8(1)	1	1	0	25(3)	8	1	0
14	FW	(Mexico) Javier Hernández	15(12)	13	4(1)	1	2(1)	1	6(3)	4	0(1)	1	27(18)	20	6	0
15	DF	(Serbia) Nemanja Vidić (c)	35	5	2	0	0	0	9	0	1	0	47	5	8	1
16	MF	(England) Michael Carrick	23(5)	0	3	0	1	0	11	0	1	0	39(5)	0	2	0
17	MF	(Portugal) Nani	31(2)	9	2(1)	0	0	0	9(3)	1	0(1)	0	42(7)	10	2	0
18	MF	(England) Paul Scholes	16(6)	1	2(1)	0	0	0	4(3)	0	1	0	23(10)	1	11	1
19	FW	(England) Danny Welbeck	0	0	0	0	0	0	0	0	0	0	0	0	0	0
20	DF	(Brazil) Fabio	5(6)	1	3(1)	1	2	0	5(2)	0	1	0	16(9)	2	3	0
21	DF	(Brazil) Rafael	15(1)	0	3	0	1(1)	0	6(1)	0	0	0	25(3)	0	3	1
22	DF	(Republic of Ireland) John O'Shea	18(2)	0	4	0	1	0	5(1)	0	1	0	29(3)	0	2	0
23	DF	(Northern Ireland) Jonny Evans	11(2)	0	2	0	2	0	2(1)	0	1	0	18(3)	0	2	1
24	MF	(Scotland) Darren Fletcher	24(2)	2	1(1)	0	1	0	5(2)	1	0(1)	0	31(6)	3	4	0
25	MF	(Ecuador) Antonio Valencia	8(2)	1	1(1)	0	0	0	5(2)	1	1	1	15(5)	3	1	0
26	FW	(France) Gabriel Obertan	3(4)	0	2	0	2(1)	0	1(2)	1	0	0	8(7)	1	0	0
27	FW	(Italy) Federico Macheda	2(5)	1	0	0	2(1)	0	1(1)	0	0	0	5(7)	1	0	0
28	MF	(Republic of Ireland) Darron Gibson	6(6)	0	3	0	2	1	3	1	0	0	14(6)	2	4	0
29	GK	(Poland) Tomasz Kuszczak	5	0	1	0	2	0	2	0	0	0	10	0	0	0
30	DF	(Belgium) Ritchie De Laet	0	0	0	0	0	0	0	0	0	0	0	0	0	0
31	MF	(Northern Ireland) Corry Evans	0	0	0	0	0	0	0	0	0	0	0	0	0	0
32	FW	(Senegal) Mame Biram Diouf	0	0	0	0	0	0	0	0	0	0	0	0	0	0
33	FW	(Portugal) Bébé	0(2)	0	1	0	2(1)	1	0(1)	1	0	0	3(4)	2	0	0
34	GK	(Denmark) Anders Lindegaard	0	0	2	0	0	0	0	0	0	0	2	0	0	0
35	MF	(England) Tom Cleverley	0	0	0	0	0	0	0	0	0	0	0	0	0	0
37	MF	(Republic of Ireland) Robbie Brady	0	0	0	0	0	0	0	0	0	0	0	0	0	0
38	FW	(England) Nicky Ajose	0	0	0	0	0	0	0	0	0	0	0	0	0	0
40	GK	(England) Ben Amos	0	0	0	0	1	0	1	0	0	0	2	0	0	0
41	FW	(Norway) Joshua King	0	0	0	0	0	0	0	0	0	0	0	0	0	0
42	MF	(France) Paul Pogba	0	0	0	0	0	0	0	0	0	0	0	0	0	0
43	MF	(England) Matty James	0	0	0	0	0	0	0	0	0	0	0	0	0	0
44	DF	(Northern Ireland) Joe Dudgeon	0	0	0	0	0	0	0	0	0	0	0	0	0	0
45	DF	(England) Oliver Gill	0	0	0	0	0	0	0	0	0	0	0	0	0	0
46	MF	(England) Ryan Tunnicliffe	0	0	0	0	0	0	0	0	0	0	0	0	0	0
47	MF	(Northern Ireland) Oliver Norwood	0	0	0	0	0	0	0	0	0	0	0	0	0	0
48	FW	(England) Will Keane	0	0	0	0	0	0	0	0	0	0	0	0	0	0
49	MF	(England) Ravel Morrison	0	0	0	0	0(1)	0	0	0	0	0	0(1)	0	0	0
50	GK	(England) Sam Johnstone	0	0	0	0	0	0	0	0	0	0	0	0	0	0
Own goals			–	3	–	0	–	0	–	0	–	0	–	3	–	–

Statistics accurate as of match played 28 May 2011.

== Transfers ==
United had a young quintet depart on 1 July. Goalkeepers Tom Heaton and Ron-Robert Zieler left the club, and they were followed by fellow youngsters Sam Hewson, Febian Brandy, and Scott Moffatt (the latter three all being released). On the same day, Serbian midfielder Zoran Tošić signed for CSKA Moscow for an undisclosed fee. Just over a fortnight later, David Gray signed for Preston North End, while in August, Craig Cathcart and Rodrigo Possebon left.

Meanwhile, on the same day that Heaton, Zieler, Hewson, Brandy, Moffatt and Tošić left, English defender Chris Smalling, Mexican forward Javier Hernández and Belgian defender Marnick Vermijl arrived (all signing for undisclosed fees). In August, Portuguese forward Bébé came in, also for an undisclosed fee (Bébé arrived just five weeks after he had signed for Vitória de Guimarães). The three new signings were unveiled to the media at a press conference on 17 August.

Departing in the winter transfer window were James Chester and Cameron Stewart, who both joined Hull City, and reserve team captain Magnus Wolff Eikrem, who joined Molde. Chester, Stewart and Eikrem all left for undisclosed fees. On 2 February, English defender Gary Neville retired after nearly two decades with the club. During the month of May, Northern Irish defenders Corry Evans and Joe Dudgeon left for Hull City. Evans' transfer was valued at up to £500,000, while Dudgeon's fee was undisclosed.

Only one transfer was made during the winter transfer window, with Danish goalkeeper Anders Lindegaard coming from Aalesund in Norway. Like Smalling, Hernández and Bébé, Lindegaard also signed for an undisclosed fee. After agreeing a contract on 27 November 2010, the transfer was completed on 1 January 2011.

=== In ===
Date	Pos.	Name	From	Fee
1 July 2010	DF	(Belgium) Marnick Vermijl	(Belgium) Standard Liège	Undisclosed
1 July 2010	DF	(England) Chris Smalling	(England) Fulham	Undisclosed
1 July 2010	FW	(Mexico) Javier Hernández	(Mexico) Guadalajara	Undisclosed
16 August 2010	FW	(Portugal) Bébé	(Portugal) Vitória de Guimarães	Undisclosed
1 January 2011	GK	(Denmark) Anders Lindegaard	(Norway) Aalesund	Undisclosed
13 June 2011	DF	(England) Phil Jones	(England) Blackburn Rovers	Undisclosed
23 June 2011	MF	(England) Ashley Young	(England) Aston Villa	Undisclosed
29 June 2011	GK	(Spain) David de Gea	(Spain) Atlético Madrid	Undisclosed

=== Out ===
Date	Pos.	Name	To	Fee
1 July 2010	GK	(England) Tom Heaton	(Wales) Cardiff City	Free
1 July 2010	MF	(Serbia) Zoran Tošić	(Russia) CSKA Moscow	Undisclosed
1 July 2010	GK	(Germany) Ron-Robert Zieler	(Germany) Hannover 96	Free
1 July 2010	FW	(England) Febian Brandy	Released	
1 July 2010	MF	(England) Sam Hewson	Released	
1 July 2010	DF	(England) Scott Moffatt	Released	
16 July 2010	DF	(Scotland) David Gray	(England) Preston North End	Free
11 August 2010	DF	(Northern Ireland) Craig Cathcart	(England) Blackpool	Undisclosed
20 August 2010	MF	(Brazil) Rodrigo Possebon	(Brazil) Santos	Undisclosed
7 January 2011	DF	(England) James Chester	(England) Hull City	Undisclosed
12 January 2011	MF	(Norway) Magnus Wolff Eikrem	(Norway) Molde	Undisclosed
31 January 2011	MF	(England) Cameron Stewart	(England) Hull City	Undisclosed
2 February 2011	DF	(England) Gary Neville	Retired	
8 May 2011	MF	(Northern Ireland) Corry Evans	(England) Hull City	£500k
11 May 2011	DF	(Northern Ireland) Joe Dudgeon	(England) Hull City	Undisclosed
28 May 2011	GK	(Netherlands) Edwin van der Sar	Retired	
31 May 2011	MF	(England) Paul Scholes	Retired	

=== Loan in ===
Date from	Date to	Position	Name	From
31 March 2011	23 March 2012	MF	(Brazil) Rafael Leão	Desportivo Brasil

=== Loan out ===
Date from	Date to	Pos.	Name	To
2 July 2010	4 January 2011	MF	(England) Matty James	(England) Preston North End
30 July 2010	21 October 2010	MF	(England) Cameron Stewart	(England) Yeovil Town
3 August 2010	31 December 2010	DF	(Wales) James Chester	(England) Carlisle United
6 August 2010	25 January 2011	MF	(England) Danny Drinkwater	(Wales) Cardiff City
6 August 2010	30 June 2011	FW	(Senegal) Mame Biram Diouf	(England) Blackburn Rovers
7 August 2010	30 December 2010	FW	(Norway) Joshua King	(England) Preston North End
12 August 2010	30 June 2011	FW	(England) Danny Welbeck	(England) Sunderland
31 August 2010	30 June 2011	MF	(England) Tom Cleverley	(England) Wigan Athletic
16 September 2010	22 October 2010	MF	(Northern Ireland) Oliver Norwood	(England) Carlisle United
24 September 2010	25 October 2010	DF	(Belgium) Ritchie De Laet	(England) Sheffield United
25 September 2010	30 June 2011	FW	(England) Nicky Ajose	(England) Bury
29 September 2010	25 October 2010	DF	(England) Oliver Gill	(England) Bradford City
29 September 2010	25 October 2010	DF	(England) Reece Brown	(England) Bradford City
29 September 2010	25 October 2010	GK	(Northern Ireland) Conor Devlin	(England) Hartlepool United
30 September 2010	29 October 2010	DF	(England) Scott Wootton	(England) Tranmere Rovers
22 October 2010	21 November 2010	MF	(Northern Ireland) Corry Evans	(England) Carlisle United
17 November 2010	30 December 2010	DF	(Belgium) Ritchie De Laet	(England) Preston North End
25 November 2010	31 January 2011	MF	(England) Cameron Stewart	(England) Hull City
7 January 2011	15 March 2011	GK	(England) Ben Amos	(England) Oldham Athletic
8 January 2011	30 June 2011	FW	(Italy) Federico Macheda	(Italy) Sampdoria
14 January 2011	30 June 2011	MF	(Northern Ireland) Corry Evans	(England) Hull City
14 January 2011	30 June 2011	DF	(Belgium) Ritchie De Laet	(England) Portsmouth
27 January 2011	30 June 2011	DF	(Northern Ireland) Joe Dudgeon	(England) Carlisle United
28 January 2011	30 June 2011	MF	(England) Danny Drinkwater	(England) Watford
