= Calaum Jahraldo-Martin =

Footballer (born 1993)

Personal information
- Full name: Calaum Jahraldo-Martin
- Date of birth: 27 April 1993 (age 33)
- Place of birth: Hemel Hempstead, Hertfordshire, England
- Height: 1.75 m (5 ft 9 in)
- Position: Defender

Youth career
- 2009–2011: FootballCV

Senior career*
Years	Team	Apps	(Gls)
2011–2012	Boreham Wood	1	(0)
2012–2013	Dulwich Hamlet	20	(2)
2013–2016	Hull City	1	(0)
2014	→ Tranmere Rovers (loan)	2	(0)
2015	→ Alloa Athletic (loan)	2	(0)
2016	→ Leyton Orient (loan)	15	(1)
2016	Oldham Athletic	4	(0)
2017–2018	Newport County	4	(0)
2018	Boreham Wood		
2018	Hemel Hempstead Town		
2018–2019	Billericay Town		

International career^{‡}
2012	Antigua and Barbuda U20	6	(1)
2014–2019	Antigua and Barbuda	22	(5)
- * Club domestic league appearances and goals as of 19:13, 9 May 2018 (UTC) ‡ National team caps and goals as of 08:34, 12 October 2018 (UTC)

Calaum Jahraldo-Martin (born 27 April 1993) is an Antiguan-English businessman and a former Antigua and Barbuda international professional footballer who played as a defender.

== Early life ==
Jahraldo-Martin lived in England, Antigua and Jamaica before moving to back to England to live in Harrow, at the age of 11. After missing a trial at Brighton & Hove Albion due to illness he joined FootballCV and attended trials days at Rushden & Diamonds, Newcastle United, Brentford and Barnet. Following the trials days, Jahraldo-Martin received interest from Conference South side Boreham Wood and went on to sign for them. During his time at FootballCV he received the FootballCV Academy Player of the Year Award.

== Club career ==
Jahraldo-Martin joined Isthmian League Division One South side Dulwich Hamlet in 2012 and during the 2012–13 season, scored 2 goals in 20 league appearances for the Greater London club as they went on to win promotion to the Isthmian League Premier Division. His impressive performances resulted in a 2-week trial at Championship side Hull City in which Jahraldo-Martin played for the Hull City Reserves. Hull manager Steve Bruce was impressed with the youngsters performance and signed him in March 2013. On the transfer, Bruce said: "He's been a breath of fresh air and who knows, we might just have unearthed a little gem." He made his Hull City debut in a League Cup match against League One side Leyton Orient on 27 August 2013, coming on as a substitute for Nick Proschwitz in the 67th minute.

On 20 November 2014, he went out on loan to Tranmere Rovers until 1 January 2015. He made his debut on 22 November 2014 in a 1–2 defeat at home to Southend United.

On 27 January 2015, Jahraldo-Martin signed for Scottish Championship club Alloa Athletic on loan until the end of the 2014–15 season.

On 2 January 2016, Jahraldo-Martin joined Leyton Orient on a one-month loan deal, He scored his first football league goal in a 2–0 away win at Wycombe Wanderers and his loan was extended for the remainder of the 2015–16 season.

On 12 August 2016, Jahraldo-Martin signed a short-term deal with Oldham Athletic.

On 3 August 2017, Jahraldo-Martin signed a one-year deal with League Two side Newport County after a successful pre-season trial period. He made his debut for Newport on the opening day of the 2017–18 season, as a second-half substitute in a 3–3 draw at Stevenage. He was released by Newport at the end of the 2017–18 season.

== International career ==
In late August 2014, Jahraldo-Martin committed to representing Antigua and Barbuda internationally and joined the squad as they prepared for the first round of 2014 Caribbean Cup qualification. Jahraldo-Martin made his international debut in Antigua's first match of the tournament, a 6–0 victory over Anguilla. He also scored his first international goal in the match, opening Antigua's scoring in the eighth minute.

=== International goals ===
As of match played 7 June 2016. Antigua and Barbuda score listed first, score column indicates score after each Jahraldo-Martin goal.

International goals by date, venue, cap, opponent, score, result and competition
No.	Date	Venue	Cap	Opponent	Score	Result	Competition
1	3 September 2014	Antigua Recreation Ground, St. John's, Antigua and Barbuda	1	Anguilla	1–0	6–0	2014 Caribbean Cup qualification
2	7 June 2016	Sir Vivian Richards Stadium, Antigua, Antigua and Barbuda	15	Grenada	2–0	5–1	2017 Caribbean Cup qualification
3	7 June 2016	Sir Vivian Richards Stadium, Antigua, Antigua and Barbuda	15	Grenada	5–1	5–1	2017 Caribbean Cup qualification
4	12 October 2018	Thomas Robinson Stadium, Nassau, Bahamas	22	Bahamas	3–0	6–0	2019–20 CONCACAF Nations League qualification
5	12 October 2018	Thomas Robinson Stadium, Nassau, Bahamas	22	Bahamas	5–0	6–0	2019–20 CONCACAF Nations League qualification

== Career statistics ==
=== Club ===
As of match played 2 September 2017

Appearances and goals by club, season and competition
Club	Season	League			National Cup		League Cup		Other		Total	
Club	Season	Division	Apps	Goals	Apps	Goals	Apps	Goals	Apps	Goals	Apps	Goals
Boreham Wood	2011–12	Conference South	1	0	0	0	—		0	0	1	0
Dulwich Hamlet	2012–13	Isthmian League; Division One South	20	2	—		—		0	0	20	2
Hull City	2012–13	Championship	0	0	0	0	0	0	—		0	0
Hull City	2013–14	Premier League	0	0	1	0	1	0	—		2	0
Hull City	2014–15	Premier League	0	0	0	0	0	0	0	0	0	0
Hull City	2015–16	Championship	1	0	0	0	1	0	0	0	2	0
Hull City	Total		1	0	1	0	2	0	0	0	4	0
Tranmere Rovers (loan)	2014–15	League Two	2	0	2	0	0	0	—		4	0
Alloa Athletic (loan)	2014–15	Scottish Championship	2	0	0	0	0	0	0	0	2	0
Leyton Orient	2015–16	League Two	15	1	0	0	0	0	0	0	15	1
Oldham Athletic	2016–17	League One	4	0	0	0	0	0	1 (Note: Appearances in the Football League Trophy)	0	5	0
Newport County	2017–18	League Two	2	0	0	0	0	0	1	0	3	0
Career total			47	3	3	0	2	0	2	0	54	3
