= Joe Dudgeon =

Northern Irish-English footballer (born 1990)

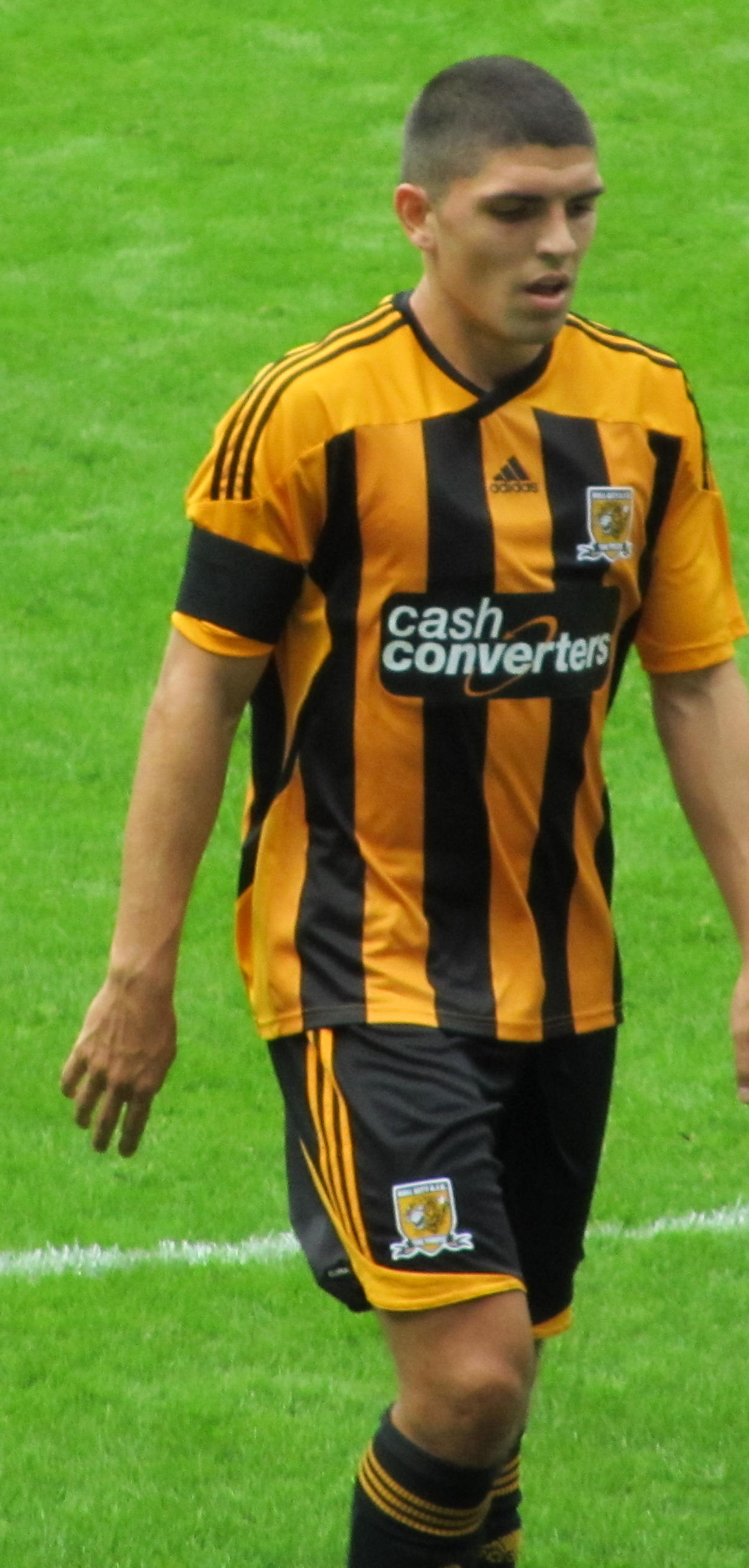
- Dudgeon playing for Hull City in 2011

Personal information
- Full name: Joseph Patrick Dudgeon
- Date of birth: 26 November 1990 (age 35)
- Place of birth: Leeds, England
- Height: 5 ft 9 in (1.75 m)
- Position: Defender

Team information
- Current team: Manchester City (scout); Northern Ireland under-17 team (coach)

Youth career
- 2006–2010: Manchester United

Senior career*
Years	Team	Apps	(Gls)
2009–2011	Manchester United	0	(0)
2011	→ Carlisle United (loan)	2	(0)
2011–2015	Hull City	33	(0)
2014–2015	→ Barnsley (loan)	15	(0)
Total		50	(0)

International career
2009–2011	Northern Ireland U21	4	(0)
- * Club domestic league appearances and goals

Joseph Patrick Dudgeon (born 26 November 1990) is a football coach, scout, and former player, who is employed by the Northern Ireland under-17 team and Manchester City respectively.

As a player, Dudgeon was a left-back; he began his career with Manchester United, and represented Carlisle United, Hull City and Barnsley in the Football League before retiring due to injury in 2015.

Born in England, he represented the Northern Ireland national under-21 team on four occasions between 2009 and 2011.

== Club career ==
=== Manchester United ===
Dudgeon was born in Leeds, England. He played his first match for the Manchester United Under-18s side in April 2006, when he was still only 15 years old, coming on as a substitute for Oliver Norwood in a 3–2 defeat away to Sunderland. He then appeared in two matches at the 2006 Northern Ireland Milk Cup in August 2006 – a 1–0 win over County Tyrone and a 2–2 draw with Sheffield United – but didn't play for the club again until February 2007, when he appeared in eight of the club's last 10 Premier Academy League fixtures. His performances earned him a trainee contract with the club, which he signed in July 2007.

The following season, Dudgeon became a regular in the Under-18 team, appearing 21 times as they managed a third-place finish in the Premier Academy League and the Fourth Round of the FA Youth Cup. He also received his first taste of reserve team football during 2007–08, being named as an unused substitute for the reserves' 4–0 win over Oldham Athletic in the quarter-finals of the Lancashire Senior Cup. He retained his spot in the under-18 side for 2008–09, while continuing to establish himself in the reserves, mainly as a substitute, making his debut on 22 January 2009 in a 3–0 win over Accrington Stanley in the first round of the Lancashire Senior Cup, coming on as a half-time substitute for Fabio. At the end of the season, Dudgeon was named in the reserve squads for the finals of both the Manchester Senior Cup and the Lancashire Senior Cup; as an unused substitute in the former and playing the full 90 minutes in the latter.

In 2009–10, Dudgeon made the full step-up to the reserve team, and after playing in the first six Premier Reserve League games of the season, he was rewarded for his performances with a first team squad number (44) ahead of the League Cup Fourth Round tie against Barnsley. However, he was not included in the matchday squad. He remained a regular in the reserve team throughout the season, appearing in 14 out of the team's 18 Premier Reserve League matches as they claimed the Premier Reserve League North title. He then appeared in the Premier Reserve League play-off against Aston Villa, which United won 3–2 on penalties after coming from behind three times to draw 3–3 in normal time.

After appearing regularly for the reserve team during the 2010–11 pre-season, Dudgeon underwent knee surgery at the end of August 2010 and missed three months of the start of the season. He returned in mid-November 2010 to reclaim his regular left-back berth, appearing in the next five Premier Reserve League matches.

=== Loan to Carlisle ===
On 27 January 2011, Dudgeon signed for Carlisle United on loan until the end of the season to provide defensive cover after Sean McDaid suffered a season-ending injury in October 2010. He was the fourth Manchester United player to go on loan to Carlisle in 2010–11. Dudgeon made his debut for Carlisle on 29 January, coming on as a half-time substitute for Peter Murphy in a 2–2 at home to Oldham Athletic. He then made his first league start three days later in Carlisle's 2–0 defeat away to Huddersfield Town.

=== Hull City ===
On 11 May 2011, Hull City signed Dudgeon on a three-year contract. He made his debut in the first game of the season on 5 August 2011 at the KC Stadium in the 1–0 defeat to Blackpool. For the remainder of the 2011–12 season, Dudgeon was in and out of the starting line-up, with regular competition for the left back slot with Andy Dawson. Under new Hull manager Steve Bruce, Dudgeon started the 2012–13 season in fine form, and was ever-present in the side until a serious knee injury in October ruled him out for the rest of the season. On 7 July 2014, Dudgeon signed a new one-year contract with the club.

On 28 May 2015, Hull City did not renew Dudgeon's contract along with five other players who were out of contract at the end of the 2014–15 season.

=== Loan to Barnsley ===
On 31 July 2014, Dudgeon joined League One side Barnsley on a one-month loan.

== International career ==
Although he was born in England, Dudgeon is of Northern Irish descent and was called up to the Northern Ireland national under-21 team in October 2009. He appeared in the team that lost 2–1 away to Iceland U21 on 13 October, and then played again against Germany U21 in a 1–1 home draw.

On 5 October 2012 it was announced that he had received his first call up for the Northern Ireland senior team for their game against Portugal on 16 October 2012.
