= 2015–16 Hull City A.F.C. season =

English football club season

Hull City
2015–16 season
- Owner: Assem Allam
- Chairman: Assem Allam
- Manager: Steve Bruce
- Stadium: KC Stadium
- Championship: 4th (promoted via play-offs)
- FA Cup: Fifth round (eliminated by Arsenal)
- League Cup: Fifth round (eliminated by Manchester City)
- Top goalscorer: League: Abel Hernández (20); All: Abel Hernández (22)
- Highest home attendance: 21,842 (26 December v Burnley)
- Lowest home attendance: 15,139 (16 December v Reading)
- Average home league attendance: 17,199
Home colours	Away colours	Third colours

The 2015–16 season was Hull City's first season back in the Football League Championship following their relegation from the Premier League last season in their 112th year in existence. Along with the Championship, the club competed in the FA Cup and Football League Cup. The season covers the period from 1 July 2015 to 30 June 2016.

== Events ==
- On 3 July 2015 Tom Ince was sold to Derby County for £4.75 million.
- On 11 July 2015, the Football Supporters Federation confirmed that a 70/30 decision was made in favour of Hull City A.F.C. not changing their name after The Football Association vote.
- On 27 July 2015 Sam Clucas was signed on a 3-year contract from Chesterfield for an undisclosed fee, reported by the Hull Daily Mail as about £1.3 million.
- On 27 July 2015 Ryan Taylor was signed on a 1-year deal after being released by Newcastle United.
- On 29 July 2015 James Chester was sold to West Bromwich Albion for an undisclosed fee, reported by the BBC as £8 million.
- On 29 July 2015 Robbie Brady moved to Norwich City for a fee of £7 million.
- On 31 July 2015 Isaac Hayden was brought in on a season-long loan from Arsenal, though this was terminated, by mutual consent, following the Queens Park Rangers match on 1 January 2016. Though he remained available for selection until another opportunity became available.
- On 4 August 2015 Chuba Akpom was brought in on a season-long loan from Arsenal.
- On 7 August 2015, Moses Odubajo joined on a 3-year deal from Brentford for a fee of £3.5 million.
- On 10 August 2015 Dame N'Doye was sold to Trabzonspor for £2.2 million.
- On 10 August 2015 goalkeeper Rory Watson moved to Scunthorpe United on a month-long loan spell.
- On 27 August 2015 Shaun Maloney as signed from Chicago Fire on a two-year deal for an undisclosed fee.
- On transfer deadline day, 1 September 2015, Nikica Jelavić moved to West Ham United for £3 million, and was replaced by Adama Diomande on a 3-year deal from Stabæk for an undisclosed fee.
- On 10 September 2015 the club revoked the suspension of Jake Livermore after a disciplinary hearing decided that the Football Association provisional ban, for testing positive for cocaine, would not be extended,
- On 12 October 2015 Conor Townsend signed a month-long loan deal with Grimsby Town, which was extended until 1 January 2016 on 5 November 2015.
- On 9 November 2015, Will Aimson joined League One side Blackpool on a one-month loan deal, this was later extended to 9 January 2016.
- On 2 January 2016, Calaum Jahraldo-Martin joined Leyton Orient on a one-month loan deal, this was later extended to the end of the 2015–16 season.
- On 6 January 2016 Conor Townsend moved to Scunthorpe United on a free transfer.
- On 7 January 2016 goalkeeper Allan McGregor signed a two-year extension to his contract with the club.
- On 14 January 2016, following a loan spell, Will Aimson signed a two-and-a-half-year contract with Blackpool for an undisclosed fee.
- On 15 January 2016 Matty Dixon signed an 18-month deal with York City.
- On 22 January 2016 midfielder David Meyler signed a two-year extension to his contract with the club.
- On transfer dead-line day, 1 February 2016, goalkeeper Dušan Kuciak was signed on an 18-month contract from Legia Warsaw for an undisclosed fee. Also Nick Powell was brought in on-loan, from Manchester United, until the end of the season.
- On 5 February 2016 Steve Bruce was named Championship Manager of the Month for January and Abel Hernández was named Championship Player of the month.
- On 9 February 2016 Greg Luer moved to Scunthorpe United on a month-long loan. After his return he moved on 12 March 2016 for another month-long loan this time at Stevenage, which was later extended to the end of the 2015–16 season.
- On 16 March 2016 Curtis Davies signed a 2-year extension to his contract with the club.
- On 16 March 2016 the club announced a new Season Membership Scheme for the 2016–17 season that would replace season tickets.
- On 25 March 2016 Cambridge United signed Max Clark on loan until the end of the 2015–16 season. On 30 June 2016 he signed a further six-month loan deal with Cambridge United.
- On 12 May 2016 Hull City announced the signing of Jonathan Edwards on a one-year contract after a successful trial with the club's U21 squad.
- On 2 June at the 2016 Stadium Events and Hospitality Awards, the club took two awards, the Matchday Hospitality Award (Medium Stadium) and the Overall Matchday Hospitality Award.
- On 2 June 2016, it was announced that Sone Aluko and Ryan Taylor would leave the club prior to their contract expiry and that Eldin Jakupović would have an additional year with the club.
- On 23 June 2016 Ahmed Elmohamady signed a 3-year extension to his contract.
- On 24 June 2016 Eldin Jakupović signed a new 2-year deal with the club rather than take the option of a 1-year extension of his existing contract.

== Players ==
As of 16 April 2016

=== First team squad ===
Note: Flags indicate national team as defined under FIFA eligibility rules; some limited exceptions apply. Players may hold more than one non-FIFA nationality.

No.	Pos.	Nation	Player
1	GK	SCO	Allan McGregor
2	MF	ENG	Moses Odubajo
4	DF	NIR	Alex Bruce
5	DF	ENG	Ryan Taylor
6	DF	ENG	Curtis Davies
7	MF	IRL	David Meyler
8	MF	ENG	Tom Huddlestone
9	FW	URU	Abel Hernández
10	MF	SCO	Robert Snodgrass
11	MF	ENG	Sam Clucas
12	DF	ENG	Harry Maguire
14	MF	ENG	Jake Livermore
15	MF	SCO	Shaun Maloney
16	GK	SUI	Eldin Jakupović

No.	Pos.	Nation	Player
17	MF	SEN	Mohamed Diamé
19	FW	ENG	Chuba Akpom (on loan from Arsenal)
20	DF	ENG	Isaac Hayden (on loan from Arsenal)
21	DF	ENG	Michael Dawson (captain)
22	FW	ENG	Nick Powell (on loan from Manchester United)
24	FW	NGA	Sone Aluko
25	FW	NOR	Adama Diomande
26	DF	SCO	Andrew Robertson
27	MF	EGY	Ahmed Elmohamady
30	GK	SVK	Dušan Kuciak
31	DF	IRL	Brian Lenihan
33	DF	ENG	Josh Tymon
35	GK	ENG	Rory Watson

=== Out on loan ===
Note: Flags indicate national team as defined under FIFA eligibility rules; some limited exceptions apply. Players may hold more than one non-FIFA nationality.

No.	Pos.	Nation	Player
32	FW	ENG	Greg Luer (on loan at Stevenage until 30 June 2016)
34	FW	ATG	Calaum Jahraldo-Martin (on loan at Leyton Orient until 30 June 2016)
–	DF	ENG	Max Clark (on loan at Cambridge United until 30 June 2016)

== Transfers ==
=== Transfers in ===
Date from	Position	Nationality	Name	From	Fee	Ref.
27 July 2015	LM	ENG	Sam Clucas	Chesterfield	£1,300,000	
27 July 2015	RB	ENG	Ryan Taylor	Newcastle United	Free transfer	
7 August 2015	RB	ENG	Moses Odubajo	Brentford	£3,500,000	
27 August 2015	MF	SCO	Shaun Maloney	Chicago Fire	Undisclosed	
1 September 2015	CF	NOR	Adama Diomande	Stabæk	Undisclosed	
1 February 2016	GK	SVK	Dušan Kuciak	Legia Warsaw	Undisclosed	
12 May 2016	FW	ENG	Jonathan Edwards	Peterborough United	Undisclosed	

Total spending: ▼£4,800,000

=== Transfers out ===
Date from	Position	Nationality	Name	To	Fee	Ref.
1 July 2015	GK	ENG	Joe Cracknell	Bradford City (Note: Following Cracknell's release he joined Bradford City.)	Released	
1 July 2015	LB	ENG	Leon Dawson	Free agent	Released	
1 July 2015	LB	NIR	Joe Dudgeon	Free Agent	Released	
1 July 2015	LB	HON	Maynor Figueroa	Colorado Rapids (Note: Following Figueroa's release he joined Colorado Rapids.)	Released	
1 July 2015	GK	ENG	Steve Harper	Free Agent	Released	
1 July 2015	CM	IRL	John Mahon	Free Agent	Released	
1 July 2015	ST	ENG	Jonathon Margetts	Tranmere Rovers (Note: Following Margetts' release he joined Tranmere Rovers.)	Free transfer	
1 July 2015	CM	NIR	Eoghan McCawl	Free Agent	Released	
1 July 2015	CB	IRL	Paul McShane	Reading (Note: Following McShane's release he joined Reading.)	Free transfer	
1 July 2015	GK	ENG	Mark Oxley	Hibernian (Note: Following Oxley's release he joined Hibernian.)	Free transfer	
1 July 2015	CM	IRL	Stephen Quinn	Reading	Free transfer	
1 July 2015	RB	ENG	Liam Rosenior	Brighton & Hove Albion (Note: Following Rosenior's release he joined Brighton & Hove Albion.)	Free transfer	
1 July 2015	CF	CIV	Yannick Sagbo	Umm Salal (Note: Following Sagbo's release he joined Umm Salal.)	Released	
1 July 2015	RB	ENG	Sam Topliss	Free Agent	Released	
3 July 2015	LW	ENG	Tom Ince	Derby County	£4,750,000	
29 July 2015	LW	IRE	Robbie Brady	Norwich City	£7,000,000	
29 July 2015	CB	WAL	James Chester	West Bromwich Albion	£8,000,000	
10 August 2015	CF	SEN	Dame N'Doye	Trabzonspor	£2,200,000	
1 September 2015	CF	CRO	Nikica Jelavić	West Ham United	£3,000,000	
6 January 2016	DF	ENG	Conor Townsend	Scunthorpe United	Free transfer	
14 January 2016	DF	ENG	Will Aimson	Blackpool	Undisclosed fee	
15 January 2016	MF	ENG	Matty Dixon	York City	Undisclosed fee	

Total income: ▲£24,950,000

=== Loans in ===
Date from	Position	Nationality	Name	From	Date until	Ref.
31 July 2015	DM	ENG	Isaac Hayden	Arsenal	End of season	
4 August 2015	CF	ENG	Chuba Akpom	Arsenal	End of season	
1 February 2016	FW	ENG	Nick Powell	Manchester United	End of season	

=== Loans out ===
Date from	Position	Nationality	Name	To	Date until	Ref.
10 August 2015	GK	ENG	Rory Watson	Scunthorpe United	7 September 2015	
12 October 2015	DF	ENG	Conor Townsend	Grimsby Town	1 January 2016	
9 November 2015	DF	ENG	Will Aimson	Blackpool	9 January 2016	
2 January 2016	FW	ATG	Calaum Jahraldo-Martin	Leyton Orient	30 June 2016	
9 February 2016	FW	ENG	Greg Luer	Scunthorpe United	8 March 2016	
12 March 2016	FW	ENG	Greg Luer	Stevenage	30 June 2016	
25 March 2016	DF	ENG	Max Clark	Cambridge United	30 June 2016	

== Pre-season ==
On 9 June 2015, Hull City announced three pre-season friendlies against North Ferriby United, Chesterfield and Sheffield United. On 18 June 2015, the club announced their confirmed fixtures for the pre-season trip to Austria.

The Tigers had a pre-season training camp in Portugal from 6 July 2015.

17 July 2015 Billy Bly Memorial Trophy	North Ferriby United	1–2	Hull City	North Ferriby
19:30 BST	Hone 12'	Report	Luer 55'; Bruce 60'	Stadium: Grange Lane; Attendance: 1,767

21 July 2015 Friendly	Chesterfield	1–3	Hull City	Chesterfield
19:30 BST	Evatt 20'	Report	Maguire 37'; Robertson 50'; Jahraldo-Martin 75'	Stadium: Proact Stadium

26 July 2015 Friendly	Hull City	0–0	Hannover 96	Zell am See, Austria
18:00 CEST		Report		Stadium: Alois Latini Stadium

29 July 2015 Friendly	Hull City	4–0	Al-Ain	Wörgl, Austria
16:00 CEST	Dawson 30'; Elmohamady 47', 58'; Jahraldo-Martin 86'	Report		Stadium: Wörgl Stadium

2 August 2015 Friendly	Sheffield United	1–1	Hull City	Sheffield
15:00 BST	Murphy 44'	Report	Hernández 79'	Stadium: Bramall Lane; Attendance: 6,266; Referee: D. Deadman

== Competition ==
=== Overall ===
Competition	Started round	Current position / round	Final position / round	First match	Last match
2015–16 Championship	—	—	4th (promoted)	8 August 2015	28 May 2016
League Cup	First round	—	Fifth round	11 August 2015	1 December 2015
FA Cup	Third round	—	Fifth round	9 January 2016	8 March 2016

Updated to match played 5 June 2016
Source: Competitions

=== Championship ===
==== League table ====
Pos	Team	Pld	W	D	L	GF	GA	GD	Pts	Promotion, qualification or relegation
2	Middlesbrough (P)	46	26	11	9	63	31	+32	89	Promotion to the Premier League
3	Brighton & Hove Albion	46	24	17	5	72	42	+30	89	Qualification for the Championship play-offs (Note: Four teams play for one spot and promotion to the Premier League.)
4	Hull City (O, P)	46	24	11	11	69	35	+34	83	Qualification for the Championship play-offs
5	Derby County	46	21	15	10	66	43	+23	78	Qualification for the Championship play-offs
6	Sheffield Wednesday	46	19	17	10	66	45	+21	74	Qualification for the Championship play-offs

Source: BBC Sport
Rules for classification: 1) Points; 2) Goal difference; 3) Number of goals scored
(O) Play-off winners; (P) Promoted

==== Results summary ====
Overall								Home						Away					
Pld	W	D	L	GF	GA	GD	Pts	W	D	L	GF	GA	GD	W	D	L	GF	GA	GD
46	24	11	11	69	35	+34	83	15	7	1	47	12	+35	9	4	10	22	23	−1

Last updated: 7 May 2016.
Source: Football League Championship

==== Result by matchday ====
Matchday	1	2	3	4	5	6	7	8	9	10	11	12	13	14	15	16	17	18	19	20	21	22	23	24	25	26	27	28	29	30	31	32	33	34	35	36	37	38	39	40	41	42	43	44	45	46
Ground	H	A	H	A	H	A	A	H	H	A	A	H	H	A	A	H	A	H	A	H	H	A	H	A	A	H	H	A	A	A	H	A	H	A	H	H	A	H	A	A	H	A	H	H	A	H
Result	W	D	W	L	W	L	W	D	D	W	D	W	W	W	W	W	D	L	L	W	W	L	W	L	W	W	W	W	L	W	D	W	D	L	D	D	L	W	L	D	W	W	D	W	L	W
Position	3	5	2	5	2	6	4	3	4	5	6	4	2	2	1	1	1	2	4	3	4	4	3	3	3	2	2	1	1	1	1	1	1	2	3	4	4	4	4	4	4	4	4	4	4	4

Updated to match(es) played on 7 May 2016. Source: Statto.com
A = Away; H = Home; W = Win; D = Draw; L = Loss

==== Matches ====
On 17 June 2015, the fixtures for the season were announced.

Win Draw Loss

8 August 2015 1	Hull City	2–0	Huddersfield Town	Kingston upon Hull
15:00 BST	Hayden (yellow card) 30'; Clucas 39'; Akpom 71'	Report	Smith (yellow card) 28'; Hudson (yellow card) 68'; Bunn (yellow card) 86'	Stadium: KC Stadium; Attendance: 19,361; Referee: Keith Hill

16 August 2015 2	Wolverhampton Wanderers	1–1	Hull City	Wolverhampton
12:00 BST	Henry 58'	Report	Odubajo (yellow card) 13'; Jelavić 22' (pen.)	Stadium: Molineux Stadium; Attendance: 20,062; Referee: Andre Marriner

19 August 2015 3	Hull City	2–1	Fulham	Kingston upon Hull
19:45 BST	Elmohamady 34'; Aluko 86'	Report	Pringle (yellow card) 35'; Bodurov (yellow card) 60'; Cairney 69'; O'Hara (yellow card) 90'	Stadium: KC Stadium; Attendance: 16,579; Referee: Graham Salisbury

22 August 2015 4	Charlton Athletic	2–1	Hull City	Charlton, London
15:00 BST	Makienok 52'; Ba (yellow card) 56'; Bergdich (yellow card) 75'; Guðmundsson 90+8'	Report	Hernández 89', (yellow card) 90'	Stadium: The Valley; Attendance: 14,844; Referee: Tim Robinson

29 August 2015 5	Hull City	2–0	Preston North End	Kingston upon Hull
15:00 BST	Hernández 37'; Odubajo (yellow card) 45+2'; Akpom (yellow card) 52'; Davies 82'	Report	Garner (yellow card) 19'; Woods (yellow card) 53'; Welsh (yellow card) 60'	Stadium: KC Stadium; Attendance: 16,949; Referee: Fred Graham

12 September 2015 6	Brighton & Hove Albion	1–0	Hull City	Brighton
15:00 BST	Hemed 5'; LuaLua (yellow card) 37'; Greer (yellow card) 40'; Stephens (yellow card) 81'	Report	Meyler (yellow card) 29'; Odubajo (yellow card) 63'	Stadium: Falmer Stadium; Attendance: 24,815; Referee: Simon Hooper

15 September 2015 7	Cardiff City	0–2	Hull City	Cardiff
19:45 BST	Fábio (yellow card) 35'; Pilkington (yellow card) 42'; Whittingham (yellow card) 59'; Peltier (yellow card) 90+4'	Report	Diamé 8'; Robertson (yellow card) 42'; Hernández 80'; McGregor (yellow card) 90'; Meyler (yellow card) 90+3'	Stadium: Cardiff City Stadium; Attendance: 13,763; Referee: Chris Sarginson

19 September 2015 8	Hull City	1–1	Queens Park Rangers	Kingston upon Hull
15:00 BST	Dawson 38'	Report	Austin 26'	Stadium: KC Stadium; Attendance: 16,651; Referee: Oliver Langford

26 September 2015 9	Hull City	1–1	Blackburn Rovers	Kingston upon Hull
15:00 BST	Davies (yellow card) 1'; Dawson (yellow card) 67'; Hernández 73'	Report	Hanley (yellow card) 51'; Steele (yellow card) 74'; Rhodes 90+1'; Evans (yellow card) 90+6'	Stadium: KC Stadium; Attendance: 16,486; Referee: Andy Haines

3 October 2015 10	Nottingham Forest	0–1	Hull City	Nottingham
15:00 BST	Mills (yellow card) 29', (red card) 87' de Vries (yellow card) 42'; Lichaj (yellow card) 85'	Report	Davies (yellow card) 33'; Hernández 41'; Dawson (yellow card) 42'; Clucas (yellow card) 85'	Stadium: City Ground; Attendance: 20,985; Referee: Nigel Miller

17 October 2015 11	Sheffield Wednesday	1–1	Hull City	Sheffield
12:30 BST	Forestieri 28'; Hutchinson (yellow card) 31'; Hunt (yellow card) 56'	Report	Diamé (yellow card) 34'; Hernández 51'; Clucas (yellow card) 63'	Stadium: Hillsborough Stadium; Attendance: 20,389; Referee: Keith Stroud

20 October 2015 12	Hull City	3–0	Ipswich Town	Kingston upon Hull
19:45 BST	Bruce (yellow card) 25', (goal) 36'; Dawson (yellow card) 40'; Akpom 43'; Meyler 58'	Report	Coke (yellow card) 33'	Stadium: KC Stadium; Attendance: 15,942; Referee: Chris Kavanagh

24 October 2015 13	Hull City	2–0	Birmingham City	Kingston upon Hull
15:00 BST	Meyler 36'; Hernández 38', (yellow card) 62'; Clucas (yellow card) 41'	Report	Grounds (yellow card) 17'; Gleeson (yellow card) 39'	Stadium: KC Stadium; Attendance: 17,436; Referee: Eddie Ilderton

31 October 2015 14	Milton Keynes Dons	0–2	Hull City	Milton Keynes
15:00 GMT	McFadzean (yellow card) 16'; Potter (yellow card) 25'; Lewington (yellow card) 83'	Report	Odubajo (yellow card) 9'; Elmohamady 19'; Meyler (yellow card) 68'; Diamé 90+5'	Stadium: Stadium mk Attendance: 15,360; Referee: Graham Scott

3 November 2015 15	Brentford	0–2	Hull City	Brentford, London
19:45 GMT		Report	Akpom (yellow card) 66'; Robertson 67'; Livermore (yellow card) 75'; Clucas 86'	Stadium: Griffin Park; Attendance: 9,221; Referee: Gavin Ward

7 November 2015 16	Hull City	3–0	Middlesbrough	Kingston upon Hull
15:00 GMT	Diamé 44'; Dawson (yellow card) 62'; Clucas 67'; Huddlestone 83'	Report		Stadium: KC Stadium; Attendance: 20,352; Referee: Jeremy Simpson

21 November 2015 17	Bristol City	1–1	Hull City	Bristol
12:30 GMT	Agard 39'; Bennett (yellow card) 68'	Report	Maguire (yellow card) 13'; Huddlestone (yellow card) 22'; Dawson (yellow card) 35'; Robertson (yellow card) 38'; Maloney 73'	Stadium: Ashton Gate Stadium; Attendance: 14,590; Referee: Paul Tierney

27 November 2015 18	Hull City	0–2	Derby County	Kingston upon Hull
19:45 GMT		Report	Butterfield 18', 34'	Stadium: KC Stadium; Attendance: 17,410; Referee: Geoff Eltringham

5 December 2015 19	Leeds United	2–1	Hull City	Beeston, Leeds
15:00 GMT	Wood 30'; Adeyemi 45'; Cook (yellow card) 54'; Silvestri (yellow card) 90+2'; Adeyemi (yellow card) 90+2'	Report	Elmohamady 51'	Stadium: Elland Road; Attendance: 24,962; Referee: Chris Kavanagh

12 December 2015 20	Hull City	1–0	Bolton Wanderers	Kingston upon Hull
15:00 GMT	Akpom 19'; Snodgrass (yellow card) 87'; Livermore (yellow card) 87'	Report	Davies (yellow card) 38'; Spearing (yellow card) 81'	Stadium: KC Stadium; Attendance: 15,739; Referee: Michael Bull

16 December 2015 21	Hull City	2–1	Reading	Kingston upon Hull
19:45 GMT	Livermore (yellow card) 45+1', (goal) 90'; Hernández 62'	Report	Blackman 29'; Bond (yellow card) 70'	Stadium: KC Stadium; Attendance: 15,139; Referee: Oliver Langford

19 December 2015 22	Rotherham United	2–0	Hull City	Rotherham
15:00 GMT	Broadfoot (yellow card) 18'; Frecklington 28' (pen.); Newell 57'; Hyam (yellow card) 70'	Report	Davies (yellow card) 41'	Stadium: New York Stadium; Attendance: 10,355; Referee: Eddie Ilderton

26 December 2015 23	Hull City	3–0	Burnley	Kingston upon Hull
15:00 GMT	Livermore 57'; Hernández 66'; Clucas 90+2'	Report		Stadium: KC Stadium; Attendance: 21,842; Referee: Mark Clattenburg

28 December 2015 24	Preston North End	1–0	Hull City	Deepdale, Preston
15:00 GMT	Gallagher 66'	Report	Davies (yellow card) 61'; Huddlestone (yellow card) 65'; Livermore (yellow card) 70'; Elmohamady (yellow card) 90+6'	Stadium: Deepdale; Attendance: 13,891; Referee: Peter Bankes

1 January 2016 25	Queens Park Rangers	1–2	Hull City	Shepherd's Bush, London
17:15 GMT	Hoilett (yellow card) 74'; Polter 86'; Angella (yellow card) 90+1'	Report	Maguire (yellow card) 35'; Hernández 61'; Diomande 90'	Stadium: Loftus Road; Attendance: 16,205; Referee: Keith Stroud

13 January 2016 26	Hull City	2–0	Cardiff City	Kingston upon Hull
19:45 GMT	Hernández 40' (pen.), (yellow card) 41'; Clucas 51'	Report		Stadium: KC Stadium; Attendance: 15,549; Referee: Scott Duncan

16 January 2016 27	Hull City	6–0	Charlton Athletic	Kingston upon Hull
15:00 GMT	Hernández 9', 16', 39'; Snodgrass 33'; Diamé 58'; Hayden 80'	Report	Lennon (yellow card) 57'; Harriott (yellow card) 87'	Stadium: KC Stadium; Attendance: 16,430; Referee: Richard Clark

23 January 2016 28	Fulham	0–1	Hull City	Fulham
15:00 GMT	Burn (yellow card) 42'	Report	Livermore (yellow card) 35'; Hayden (yellow card) 54'; Odubajo (yellow card) 72'; Hernández 80' (pen.)	Stadium: Craven Cottage; Attendance: 16,935; Referee: Paul Tierney

6 February 2016 29	Burnley	1–0	Hull City	Burnley
15:00 GMT	Vokes 77', (yellow card) 80'	Report	Hayden (yellow card) 40'	Stadium: Turf Moor; Attendance: 17,667; Referee: Graham Scott

13 February 2016 30	Blackburn Rovers	0–2	Hull City	Blackburn
15:00 GMT		Report	Hernández 53'; Diamé 63'	Stadium: Ewood Park; Attendance: 13,902; Referee: Oliver Langford

16 February 2016 31	Hull City	0–0	Brighton & Hove Albion	Kingston upon Hull
19:45 GMT	Livermore (yellow card) 87'	Report		Stadium: KC Stadium; Attendance: 17,321; Referee: Andy Madley

23 February 2016 32	Ipswich Town	0–1	Hull City	Ipswich
19:45 GMT	Smith (yellow card) 88'	Report	Diamé 48'	Stadium: Portman Road; Attendance: 17,630; Referee: Brendan Malone

26 February 2016 33	Hull City	0–0	Sheffield Wednesday	Kingston upon Hull
19:45 GMT		Report	Bennett (yellow card) 56'; Forestieri (yellow card) 85' (yellow-red card) 90+1'	Stadium: KC Stadium; Attendance: 17,884; Referee: Tim Robinson

3 March 2016 34	Birmingham City	1–0	Hull City	Birmingham
19:45 GMT	Toral 14'	Report		Stadium: St Andrew's; Attendance: 18,105; Referee: Steve Martin

12 March 2016 35	Hull City	1–1	Milton Keynes Dons	Kingston upon Hull
15:00 GMT	Hayden (yellow card) 40'; Clucas 53'; Huddlestone (yellow card) 90+3'	Report	Kay 51', (yellow card) 64'; Carruthers (yellow card) 52'; Lewington (yellow card) 77'	Stadium: KC Stadium; Attendance: 16,183; Referee: Jeremy Simpson

15 March 2016 36	Hull City	1–1	Nottingham Forest	Kingston upon Hull
17:45 GMT	Robertson (yellow card) 41'; Aluko 73'; Elmohamady (yellow card) 76'	Report	Gardner 28'; Osborn (yellow card) 441'; Mendes (yellow card) 74'	Stadium: KC Stadium; Attendance: 15,663; Referee: Andy Davies

18 March 2016 37	Middlesbrough	1–0	Hull City	Middlesbrough
19:45 GMT	Leadbitter (yellow card) 45+2'; Clayton (yellow card) 53'; Nugent 90+1'	Report	Diamé (yellow card) 32'	Stadium: Riverside Stadium; Attendance: 26,791; Referee: Andre Marriner

2 April 2016 38	Hull City	4–0	Bristol City	Kingston upon Hull
15:00 BST	Davies 14'; Snodgrass 39'; Diamé 71'; Aluko 80'	Report	Pearce (yellow card) 49'	Stadium: KC Stadium; Attendance: 16,521; Referee: Stuart Attwell

5 April 2016 39	Derby County	4–0	Hull City	Derby
19:45 BST	Johnson 29', 38'; Martin 84'; Bryson 90+4'	Report	Odubajo (red card) 55'; Clucas (yellow card) 74'	Stadium: Pride Park Stadium; Attendance: 29,078; Referee: Tony Harrington

9 April 2016 40	Huddersfield Town	2–2	Hull City	Huddersfield
15:00 BST	Whitehead (yellow card) 12'; Paterson 40'; Huws (yellow card) 89'; Maguire 90' (o.g.)	Report	Livermore (yellow card) 26'; Maguire (yellow card) 61'; Hernández 76'; Diomande 90+3'	Stadium: John Smith's Stadium; Attendance: 12,883; Referee: Darren Deadman

15 April 2016 41	Hull City	2–1	Wolverhampton Wanderers	Kingston upon Hull
19:45 BST	Diomande 5'; Snodgrass 90+4' (Note: Originally credited as an own goal by Wolverhampton Wanderers goalkeeper Carl Ikeme this was later officially credited to Robert Snodgrass.)	Report	Edwards 19'	Stadium: KC Stadium; Attendance: 15,504; Referee: James Adcock

19 April 2016 42	Reading	1–2	Hull City	Reading, Berkshire
20:00 BST	Cooper 4'	Report	Hernández 18'; Robertson 79'; Hayden (yellow card) 87'	Stadium: Madejski Stadium; Attendance: 12,949; Referee: Fred Graham

23 April 2016 43	Hull City	2–2	Leeds United	Kingston upon Hull
15:00 BST	Hernández 45+1'; Huddlestone 45+3'; Odubajo (yellow card) 65'; Livermore (yellow card) 72'; Maguire (yellow card) 85'	Report	Wood 15'; Bamba (yellow card) 30'; Cooper (yellow card) 79'; Dallas 88'	Stadium: KC Stadium; Attendance: 20,732; Referee: Iain Williamson

26 April 2016 44	Hull City	2–0	Brentford	Kingston upon Hull
19:45 BST	Dean 31' (o.g.); Diamé 45'	Report	O'Connell (yellow card) 77'; Saunders (yellow card) 89'	Stadium: KC Stadium; Attendance: 15,225; Referee: Darren Bond

30 April 2016 45	Bolton Wanderers	1–0	Hull City	Bolton, Greater Manchester
12:30 BST	Davies (yellow card) 30'; Pratley (yellow card) 45'; Dobbie 65'	Report	Clucas (yellow card) 67'; Huddlestone (yellow card) 77'	Stadium: Macron Stadium; Attendance: 14,366; Referee: Graham Scott

7 May 2016 46	Hull City	5–1	Rotherham United	Kingston upon Hull
12:30 BST	Snodgrass 25'; Hernández 27'; Livermore 40', 59'; Diamé 42'	Report	Frecklington 16'; Kelly (yellow card) 68'	Stadium: KC Stadium; Attendance: 18,670; Referee: Scott Duncan

==== Football League play-offs ====
As a result of Hull finishing in fourth place in the Championship they qualified for the Football League play-offs. In the play-off semi finals Hull played against fifth placed team Derby County over two legs. The first leg was held on 14 May 2016 at Derby's Pride Park. Hull's top scorer Abel Hernández was the first to score with a strike from 25 yards after half an hour. This was followed 10 minutes later with a shot by Moses Odubajo deflected in by defender Jason Shackell. Andrew Robertson completed the scoring with a late stoppage time goal to give Hull a 3–0 advantage going into the second leg at the KC Stadium on 17 May 2016. Derby got off to a great start with a goal from close range by Johnny Russell after 7 minutes. Their lead was doubled when a sliced ball by Andrew Robertson went into his own net 30 minutes later. Derby continued to press but Hull hung on to deny them any further scores. The match ended 2–0 to Derby, but Hull progressed 3–2 on aggregate, much to the relief of manager Steve Bruce who was in charge for the 200th time. The final, on 28 May 2016 at Wembley Stadium, was a local derby against Sheffield Wednesday who beat Brighton & Hove Albion 3–1 on aggregate in the other semi-final. Hull beat Sheffield Wednesday 1–0 in the final with the only goal coming from a 25-yard wonder strike by Mohamed Diamé in the 72nd minute. The Tigers made an immediate return to the top flight and it was Bruce's fourth promotion to the Premier League as manager.

14 May 2016 Semi-final (1st leg)	Derby County	0–3	Hull City	Derby
12:30 BST	Olsson (yellow card) 28'	Report	Hernández 30'; Dawson (yellow card) 35'; Shackell 40' (o.g.); Livermore (yellow card) 45+2'; Odubajo (yellow card) 72'; Robertson 90+8'	Stadium: Pride Park Stadium; Attendance: 29,969; Referee: Neil Swarbrick

17 May 2016 Semi-final (2nd leg)	Hull City	0–2 (3–2 agg.)	Derby County	Kingston upon Hull
19:45 BST	Snodgrass (yellow card) 21'; Livermore (yellow card) 30'; Odubajo (yellow card) 50'	Report	Russell 7'; Robertson 36' (o.g.); Shackell (yellow card) 56'; Hendrick (yellow card) 88'	Stadium: KC Stadium; Attendance: 20,470; Referee: Michael Oliver

28 May 2016 Final	Hull City	1–0	Sheffield Wednesday	London
17:00 BST	Dawson (yellow card) 10'; Diamé 72'	Report		Stadium: Wembley Stadium; Attendance: 70,189; Referee: Bobby Madley

=== League Cup ===
On 16 June 2015, the first round draw was made, and Hull City were drawn away against Accrington Stanley. The match took place on 11 August 2015 at the Crown Ground with neither team managing to score during normal time. In extra time both teams scored twice leaving the game to be determined by penalties which Hull won 4–3. In the second round, Hull City were handed a home tie against Rochdale. The match was played on 25 August 2015 and Greg Luer put Hull in front after 9 minutes with the only goal of the game. The third round draw was made on 25 August 2015 live on Sky Sports by Charlie Nicholas and Phil Thompson. Hull City were drawn at home to Swansea City. The match took place on 22 September 2015 with the first-half seeing several attempts by both teams. It was not until the 41st minute that David Meyler broke the deadlock by scoring what turned out to be the only goal of the match. The draw for the fourth round took place on 23 September 2015 and Hull were again drawn at home this time to Leicester City. The match took place on 27 October 2015 at the KC Stadium and the game remained goalless at full-time. Ten minutes into extra-time Riyad Mahrez put Leicester in front, but they were pegged back five minutes later through substitute Abel Hernández, to take the match into a penalty-shootout. City scored all of their shots while Leicester only scored four as Riyad Mahrez attempt was saved by Eldin Jakupovic. This took Hull through to their first ever quarter-final appearance in the League Cup. The quarter-final draw took place the following day and Hull were drawn away to Manchester City. The match took place on 1 December 2015 at the City of Manchester Stadium. Manchester opened the scoring 12 minutes into the game when Wilfried Bony scored from a rebound off the post. That remained the only goal until 10 minutes from the end when Kelechi Iheanacho put Manchester two up. Minutes later Kevin De Bruyne capitalised on a poor back header from Andrew Robertson to put the home team 3–0 up. De Bruyne scored again, minutes later, from an edge of the area free-kick leaving Hull to get a consolation goal through Robertson in extra-time. The result was a 4–1 defeat or City in their first ever quarter-final appearance. On a bright note for Hull, the match saw the return from injury of Robert Snodgrass when he came on as a replacement for Sone Aluko in the 73rd minute.

11 August 2015 First round	Accrington Stanley	2–2 (a.e.t.) (3–4 p)	Hull City	Accrington
19:45 BST	Winnard (yellow card) 90+2'; Crooks 105'; Gornell 115'	Report	Clucas (yellow card) 44'; Maguire (yellow card) 79'; Akpom 92'; Luer 108'; Meyler (yellow card) 114'	Stadium: Crown Ground; Attendance: 2,118; Referee: David Webb
	Penalties
	Mingoia (penalty scored); Windass (penalty scored); Kee (penalty missed); McConville (penalty missed); Gornell (penalty scored); Crooks (penalty missed)		Luer (penalty scored); Maguire (penalty missed); Huddlestone (penalty scored); Akpom (penalty scored); Meyler (penalty missed); Davies (penalty scored)

25 August 2015 Second round	Hull City	1–0	Rochdale	Kingston upon Hull
19:45 BST	Luer 9'	Report	Eastham (yellow card) 50'	Stadium: KC Stadium; Attendance: 10,430; Referee: Mark Haywood

22 September 2015 Third round	Hull City	1–0	Swansea City	Kingston upon Hull
19:45 BST	Robertson (yellow card) 40'; Meyler 41'	Report	Amat (yellow card) 42'	Stadium: KC Stadium; Attendance: 16,286; Referee: James Linington

27 October 2015 Fourth round	Hull City	1–1 (a.e.t.) (5–4 p)	Leicester City	Kingston upon Hull
19:45 GMT	Hayden (yellow card) 88'; Akpom (yellow card) 92'; Robertson (yellow card) 100'; Hernández 106'	Report	Benalouane (yellow card) 77'; Albrighton (yellow card) 87'; Mahrez 100'	Stadium: KC Stadium; Attendance: 16,818; Referee: Stuart Attwell
	Penalties
	Hernández (penalty scored); Maloney (penalty scored); Huddlestone (penalty scored); Akpom (penalty scored); Meyler (penalty scored)		Mahrez (penalty missed); Drinkwater (penalty scored); Inler (penalty scored); Wasilewski (penalty scored); Vardy (penalty scored)

1 December 2015 Fifth round	Manchester City	4–1	Hull City	Manchester
19:45 GMT	Bony 12'; Mangala (yellow card) 42'; Iheanacho 80'; De Bruyne 82', 87'	Report	Maguire (yellow card) 75'; Robertson 90+2'	Stadium: City of Manchester Stadium; Attendance: 38,246; Referee: Neil Swarbrick

=== FA Cup ===
Hull entered the FA Cup competition in the third round the draw for which the took place on 7 December 2015 and Hull were drawn at home to follow Championship side Brighton & Hove Albion. The match took place on 9 January 2016. In the 40th minute of the match Lewis Dunk fouled Harry Maguire in the box to give Hull a penalty. Robert Snodgrass took the penalty to score his first goal for the club. Brighton's Andrew Crofts shot in extra-time rebounded off the cross-bar to give Hull the victory 1–0. The draw for the fourth round took place on 11 January 2015 and Hull were drawn away to the winner of the Bury and Bradford City third-round match. The replay took place on 19 January 2016 and the match remained goalless after extra-time, but Bury took the match 4–2 on penalties. Thus Hull played Bury on 30 January 2016 at Gigg Lane, Bury. The match was played in difficult weather conditions, with Steve Bruce making 11 changes to the squad that played at Fulham in the league, including a first senior start for youngster Josh Tymon. Bury started the best, but after 14 minutes David Meyler broke through only to see his shot blocked by Ian Lawlor, Chuba Akpom was on-hand to net the rebound. After the break, there was chances for both sides before Sone Aluko was brought down in the box, and Akpom was given the opportunity to take the spot-kick to score his second of the match. Ten minutes later Akpom netted his hat-trick leaving Craig Jones to score a late consolation goal for Bury. The draw for the fifth round took place on 31 January 2016 and Hull were drawn away to Arsenal, the third year in a row the clubs had faced each other in the competition. The match took place on 20 February 2016 at the Emirates Stadium. City made ten changes from the previous league game but failed to make any inroads into the Arsenal defence. Arsenal had a number of chances but could not make a breakthrough, as Eldin Jakupović pulled off some spectacular saves to maintain a clean-sheet. The game finished 0–0 and a replay at the KC Stadium was to be arranged. The draw for the quarter-final took place the following day and the winner was drawn at home to Watford. The date for the Arsenal replay was later confirmed as 8 March 2016 with live coverage on BT Sport. The match kicked off at 7.00 p.m. and City matched Arsenal until just before the break when Olivier Giroud seized on a mistake by David Meyler to open the scoring. He went on to double Arsenal's lead halfway through the second-half before Theo Walcott got a brace of goals late in the game. Hull lost the match 4–0 giving Arsenal the victory for the third season in a row.

9 January 2016 Third round	Hull City	1–0	Brighton & Hove Albion	Kingston upon Hull
15:00 GMT	Snodgrass 41' (pen.); Robertson (yellow card) 90+4'	Report	Goldson (yellow card) 13'; Dunk (yellow card) 23'; Calderón (yellow card) 60'	Stadium: KC Stadium; Attendance: 10,706; Referee: Geoff Eltringham

30 January 2016 Fourth round	Bury	1–3	Hull City	Bury, Greater Manchester
15:00 GMT	Jones 86'	Report	Akpom 14', 57' (pen.), 69'	Stadium: Gigg Lane; Attendance: 7,064; Referee: Darren Bond

20 February 2016 Fifth round	Arsenal	0–0	Hull City	Holloway, London
12:45 GMT	Koscielny (yellow card) 41'; Chambers (yellow card) 56'	Report	Maguire (yellow card) 31'; Maloney (yellow card) 33'; Bruce (yellow card) 90'	Stadium: Emirates Stadium; Attendance: 59,830; Referee: Mike Dean

8 March 2016 Fifth round replay	Hull City	0–4	Arsenal	Kingston upon Hull
19:00 GMT	Diamé (yellow card) 47'; Maguire (yellow card) 51'	Report	Elneny (yellow card) 32'; Giroud (yellow card) 34', (goal) 41', 71'; Walcott 77', 88'	Stadium: KC Stadium; Attendance: 20,993; Referee: Mike Jones

== Statistics ==
=== Captains ===
No.	P	Name	Country	No. games	Notes
6	DF	Curtis Davies	(England)	16	
7	DF	David Meyler	(Republic of Ireland)	3	
8	MF	Tom Huddlestone	(England)	3	
14	MF	Jake Livermore	(England)	11	
21	DF	Michael Dawson	(England)	25	

Last updated: 5 June 2016
Source: Competitive match reports.
Competitive matches only
Matches started as captain only
Country: FIFA nationality; No.: Squad number; P: Position; Name: Player name; No. Games: Number of games started as captain.

=== Appearances ===
As of 5 June 2016 (Note: Compiled from competitive match reports.)

No.	Pos	Nat	Player	Total		Championship		FA Cup		League Cup		Play-offs	
No.	Pos	Nat	Player	Apps	Goals	Apps	Goals	Apps	Goals	Apps	Goals	Apps	Goals
1	GK	(Scotland) SCO	Allan McGregor	44	0	44	0	0	0	0	0	0	0
2	MF	(England) ENG	Moses Odubajo	53	0	42	0	2+1	0	3+2	0	3	0
4	DF	(Northern Ireland) NIR	Alex Bruce	17	1	9+2	1	3	0	2	0	0+1	0
5	DF	(England) ENG	Ryan Taylor	12	0	1+3	0	3+1	0	4	0	0	0
6	DF	(England) ENG	Curtis Davies	47	2	37+2	2	3	0	2	0	3	0
7	MF	(Republic of Ireland) IRL	David Meyler	35	3	20+6	2	3	0	3+1	1	0+2	0
8	MF	(England) ENG	Tom Huddlestone	46	2	24+13	2	2+1	0	2+1	0	3	0
9	FW	(Uruguay) URU	Abel Hernández	46	22	35+5	20	0	0	1+2	1	3	1
10	MF	(Scotland) SCO	Robert Snodgrass	29	5	18+6	4	1	1	0+1	0	3	0
11	MF	(England) ENG	Sam Clucas	52	6	39+5	6	0+2	0	2+1	0	0+3	0
12	DF	(England) ENG	Harry Maguire	33	0	17+5	0	3+1	0	5	0	0+2	0
14	MF	(England) ENG	Jake Livermore	39	4	33+1	4	0	0	2	0	3	0
15	MF	(Scotland) SCO	Shaun Maloney	23	1	8+12	1	1	0	2	0	0	0
16	GK	(Switzerland) SUI	Eldin Jakupović	14	0	2	0	4	0	5	0	3	0
17	MF	(Senegal) SEN	Mohamed Diamé	45	10	31+7	9	1	0	2+1	0	3	1
18	FW	(Croatia) CRO	Nikica Jelavić	5	1	3+1	1	0	0	1	0	0	0
19	FW	(England) ENG	Chuba Akpom	41	7	19+16	3	1	3	2+2	1	0+1	0
20	MF	(England) ENG	Isaac Hayden	24	1	9+9	1	1+1	0	4	0	0	0
21	DF	(England) ENG	Michael Dawson	37	1	32	1	1	0	1	0	3	0
22	FW	(England) ENG	Nick Powell	5	0	0+3	0	2	0	0	0	0	0
24	FW	(Nigeria) NGA	Sone Aluko	31	3	8+17	3	2+2	0	2	0	0	0
25	FW	(Norway) NOR	Adama Diomande	15	3	3+8	3	4	0	0	0	0	0
26	DF	(Scotland) SCO	Andrew Robertson	52	4	41+1	2	1+1	0	5	1	3	1
27	MF	(Egypt) EGY	Ahmed Elmohamady	51	3	31+10	3	3	0	3+1	0	3	0
28	FW	(Senegal) SEN	Dame N'Doye	0	0	0	0	0	0	0	0	0	0
30	DF	(England) ENG	Conor Townsend	0	0	0	0	0	0	0	0	0	0
31	DF	(Republic of Ireland) IRL	Brian Lenihan	1	0	1	0	0	0	0	0	0	0
32	FW	(England) ENG	Greg Luer	6	2	0+2	0	1	0	2+1	2	0	0
33	MF	(England) ENG	Matty Dixon	1	0	0	0	0	0	0+1	0	0	0
33	DF	(England) ENG	Josh Tymon	2	0	0	0	2	0	0	0	0	0
34	FW	(Antigua and Barbuda) ATG	Calaum Jahraldo-Martin	2	0	0+1	0	0	0	0+1	0	0	0

- Source: Compiled from competitive match reports

Note: Appearances shown after a "+" indicate player came on during course of match.

=== Top scorers ===
Player	Number	Position	Championship	FA Cup	League Cup	Play-offs	Total
(Uruguay) Abel Hernández	9	FW	20	0	1	1	22
(Senegal) Mohamed Diamé	17	MF	9	0	0	1	10
(England) Chuba Akpom	19	FW	3	3	1	0	7
(England) Sam Clucas	11	MF	6	0	0	0	6
(Scotland) Robert Snodgrass	10	MF	4	1	0	0	5
(England) Jake Livermore	14	MF	4	0	0	0	4
(Scotland) Andrew Robertson	26	DF	2	0	1	1	4
(Nigeria) Sone Aluko	24	FW	3	0	0	0	3
(Norway) Adama Diomande	25	FW	3	0	0	0	3
(Egypt) Ahmed Elmohamady	27	MF	3	0	0	0	3
(Republic of Ireland) David Meyler	7	MF	2	0	1	0	3
(England) Curtis Davies	6	DF	2	0	0	0	2
(England) Tom Huddlestone	8	MF	2	0	0	0	2
(England) Greg Luer	32	FW	0	0	2	0	2
(Northern Ireland) Alex Bruce	4	DF	1	0	0	0	1
(England) Michael Dawson	21	DF	1	0	0	0	1
(England) Isaac Hayden	20	MF	1	0	0	0	1
(Croatia) Nikica Jelavić	18	FW	1	0	0	0	1
(Scotland) Shaun Maloney	15	MF	1	0	0	0	1
Total			68	4	6	3	81

=== Disciplinary record ===
Player	Number	Position	Championship		FA Cup		League Cup		Play-offs		Total	
Player	Number	Position	Booked	Sent off (straight red)	Booked	Sent off (straight red)	Booked	Sent off (straight red)	Booked	Sent off (straight red)	Booked	Sent off (straight red)
(England) Moses Odubajo	2	MF	6	1	0	0	0	0	2	0	8	1
(England) Jake Livermore	14	MF	8	0	0	0	0	0	2	0	10	0
(England) Harry Maguire	12	DF	4	0	2	0	2	0	0	0	8	0
(England) Michael Dawson	21	DF	5	0	0	0	0	0	1	0	7	0
(Scotland) Andrew Robertson	26	DF	4	0	1	0	2	0	0	0	7	0
(England) Sam Clucas	11	MF	5	0	0	0	1	0	0	0	6	0
(England) Isaac Hayden	20	MF	5	0	0	0	1	0	0	0	6	0
(England) Curtis Davies	6	DF	4	0	0	0	0	0	0	0	4	0
(England) Tom Huddlestone	8	MF	4	0	0	0	0	0	0	0	4	0
(Republic of Ireland) David Meyler	7	MF	3	0	0	0	1	0	0	0	4	0
(England) Chuba Akpom	19	FW	2	0	0	0	1	0	0	0	3	0
(Senegal) Mohamed Diamé	17	MF	2	0	1	0	0	0	0	0	3	0
(Northern Ireland) Alex Bruce	4	DF	1	0	1	0	0	0	0	0	2	0
(Egypt) Ahmed Elmohamady	27	MF	2	0	0	0	0	0	0	0	2	0
(Uruguay) Abel Hernández	9	FW	2	0	0	0	0	0	0	0	2	0
(Scotland) Robert Snodgrass	10	MF	1	0	0	0	0	0	1	0	2	0
(Scotland) Shaun Maloney	15	MF	0	0	1	0	0	0	0	0	1	0
(Scotland) Allan McGregor	1	GK	1	0	0	0	0	0	0	0	1	0
Total			59	1	6	0	8	0	7	0	79	1

== Kits ==
On 10 July 2015 it was announced that Flamingo Land would be the shirt sponsor for the season. The new home kit was revealed on 13 July 2015. The back of shirt sponsor was announced on 28 July 2015 as the local firm Hudgell Solicitors. The away kit was shown by boxer Luke Campbell before and after his fight in Hull against Tommy Coyle.

== Awards ==
The annual awards was held on 3 May 2016. Abel Hernández was named Player of the Year and Player's Player of the Year. Robert Snodgrass was awarded Goal of the Season for his last minute strike against Wolverhampton Wanderers on 15 April 2016. Josh Tymon was named the Academy Player of the Season.
