= 2009–10 Wigan Athletic F.C. season =

Wigan Athletic
- Chairman: Dave Whelan
- Manager: Roberto Martínez
- Premier League: 16th
- FA Cup: Fourth round
- League Cup: Second round
- Top goalscorer: League: Hugo Rodallega (10); All: Hugo Rodallega (10)
- Highest home attendance: 22,113 vs. Arsenal
- Lowest home attendance: 5,335 vs. Hull City
Home colours	Away colours

The 2009–10 English football season is Wigan Athletic's fifth consecutive season in the Premier League.

After Steve Bruce left the club to join Sunderland, the club approached Swansea City manager Roberto Martínez. The Spaniard signed a three-year deal with Wigan on 15 June, bringing four backroom staff with him.

The new manager's first signing was Jordi Gómez, who signed from RCD Espanyol. The club then confirmed three pre-season fixtures, all away, to Crewe Alexandra, Preston North End and Norwich City.

The departure of Ecuadorian winger Antonio Valencia was confirmed on 30 June, as the 23-year-old moved to Manchester United for a club-record fee rumoured to be around £16 million. The club then announced the signing of Hendry Thomas from Honduran side Olimpia on a three-year deal.

Trinidadian striker Jason Scotland became Martínez's third signing when he agreed a two-year deal on 15 July. Republic of Ireland under-21 international James McCarthy then agreed a five-year deal, joining from Scottish Premier League side Hamilton Academical.

Chelsea winger Scott Sinclair signed a one-year loan deal with the club, and Martínez also signed Spaniards Román Golobart and Abian Serrano. Rayo Vallecano centre-half Antonio Amaya was also snapped up on the eve of the new season on a three-year deal. Meanwhile, former manager Steve Bruce brought midfielder Lee Cattermole to Sunderland for £6 million.

There was further movement in the transfer market as Martínez signed defensive midfielder Mohamed Diamé after complications suffered with Diamé's medical. The club then confirmed the departure of midfielder Michael Brown to Portsmouth after two years and 64 appearances.

== Transfers ==
=== In ===
Player	From	Fee	Date
(Spain) Jordi Gómez	(Spain) Espanyol	£1.7 million	19 June 2009
(Honduras) Hendry Thomas	(Honduras) Olimpia	Undisclosed	2 July 2009
(Trinidad and Tobago) Jason Scotland	(Wales) Swansea City	£2 million	18 July 2009
(Republic of Ireland) James McCarthy	(Scotland) Hamilton Academical	£1.2 million	21 July 2009
(Spain) Antonio Amaya	(Spain) Rayo Vallecano	Undisclosed	14 August 2009
(France) Mohamed Diamé	(Spain) Rayo Vallecano	Undisclosed	22 August 2009
(Ivory Coast) Steve Gohouri	Unattached	Free	12 January 2010
(Scotland) Gary Caldwell	(Scotland) Celtic	Undisclosed	13 January 2010
(England) Victor Moses	(England) Crystal Palace	£2.5 million	31 January 2010

=== Out ===
Player	To	Fee	Date
(Ecuador) Antonio Valencia	(England) Manchester United	£16 million	30 June 2009
(England) Lewis Montrose	(England) Wycombe Wanderers	Free	1 July 2009
(England) Lee Cattermole	(England) Sunderland	£6 million	12 August 2009
(England) Michael Brown	(England) Portsmouth	Nominal	28 August 2009

=== Released ===
Player	Date
(Senegal) Henri Camara	1 July 2009
(France) Antoine Sibierski	1 July 2009
(Jamaica) Marlon King	29 October 2009
(Sweden) Erik Edman	8 February 2010

=== Loans in ===
Player	From	Start date	End date
(England) Scott Sinclair	(England) Chelsea	6 August 2009	End of season
(Serbia) Vladimir Stojković	(Portugal) Sporting CP	7 January 2010	End of season
(Bolivia) Marcelo Moreno	(Ukraine) Shakhtar Donetsk	1 February 2010	End of season

=== Loans out ===
Player	To	Start date	End date
(England) Ben Watson	(England) Queens Park Rangers	1 September 2009	31 December 2009
(South Korea) Cho Won-hee	(South Korea) Suwon Bluewings	4 January 2010	January 2011
(France) Olivier Kapo	(France) Boulogne	8 January 2010	End of season
(Netherlands) Daniël de Ridder	(Israel) Hapoel Tel Aviv	22 January 2010	End of season
(England) Ben Watson	(England) West Bromwich Albion	22 February 2010	1 April 2010
(Poland) Tomasz Cywka	(England) Derby County	25 March 2010	End of season
(Netherlands) Rachid Bouaouzan	(Sweden) Helsingborgs IF	1 April 2010	30 June 2010
(England) Jon Routledge	(Sweden) Östersunds FK	1 April 2010	30 June 2010
(England) Joe Holt	(Sweden) Östersunds FK	1 April 2010	30 June 2010

== Match results ==
Match won	Match drawn	Match lost

=== Pre-season ===
Kick Off	Opponents	H / A	Result	Scorers	Attendance	Report
2009-07-16 19:30	Crewe Alexandra	A	0–1		2,063	MR
2009-07-20 17:30	Hannover 96	N	1–1	Melchiot 11'	250	MR
2009-07-22 10:00	Timișoara	N	0–2			MR
2009-07-24 17:30	PFC Minyor Pernik	N	1–1	Rodallega 5'	200	MR
2009-07-28 19:45	Preston North End	A	4–1	Rodallega 36', N'Zogbia 38', Brown 47', Scotland 69'		MR
2009-08-01 15:00	Norwich City	A	2–3	N'Zogbia 9', Cho 49'	8,927	MR
2009-08-08 15:00	St Mirren	H	3–1	Koumas 27', Rodallega 49', Melchiot 58'		

=== Premier League ===
Matchday	1	2	3	4	5	6	7	8	9	10	11	12	13	14	15	16	17	18	19	20	21	22	23	24	25	26	27	28	29	30	31	32	33	34	35	36	37	38
Ground	A	H	H	A	H	A	H	A	H	A	A	H	A	H	H	A	A	H	A	A	A	H	A	H	H	H	A	H	A	H	H	A	A	H	H	A	H	A
Result	W	L	L	L	W	L	W	L	D	W	L	D	L	W	L	D	L	D	L	W	L	L	D	D	D	L	L	W	L	L	W	L	L	D	W	L	D	L
Position	5	7	16	17	12	15	10	12	13	10	12	13	15	14	14	14	14	16	17	15	16	15	16	15	15	16	17	15	16	16	16	16	16	16	15	16	15	16

Source: WorldFootball.com
A = Away; H = Home; W = Win; D = Draw; L = Loss

15 August 2009	Aston Villa	0–2	Wigan Athletic	Villa Park, Aston
15:00	Delph (yellow card) 43'; Young (yellow card) 85'	(Report)	Rodallega 31'; Koumas 56'; Bramble (yellow card) 79'; Figueroa (yellow card) 83'	Attendance: 35,578; Referee: Mark Clattenburg

18 August 2009	Wigan Athletic	0–1	Wolverhampton Wanderers	DW Stadium, Wigan
19:45		(Report)	Keogh 6', (yellow card) 57'; Stearman (yellow card) 72'; Edwards (yellow card) 90+2'	Attendance: 16,661; Referee: Mike Jones

22 August 2009	Wigan Athletic	0–5	Manchester United	DW Stadium, Wigan
15:00	Rodallega (yellow card) 76'; Scharner (yellow card) 90+1'	(Report)	Scholes (yellow card) 19'; Evra (yellow card) 49'; Rooney 56', 65'; Berbatov 58'; Owen 85'; Nani 90+2'	Attendance: 18,164; Referee: Howard Webb

30 August 2009	Everton	2–1	Wigan Athletic	Goodison Park, Liverpool
15:00	Osman (yellow card) 58'; Saha 62'; Baines 90+4' (pen.)	(Report)	Diamé (yellow card) 19'; Melchiot (yellow card) 33'; Boyce (yellow card) 38'; Thomas (yellow card) 42'; Scharner 57'; N'Zogbia (yellow card) 75'	Attendance: 35,122; Referee: Lee Probert

12 September 2009	Wigan Athletic	1–0	West Ham United	DW Stadium, Wigan
15:00	Rodallega 55'; Figueroa (yellow card) 69'; Bramble (yellow card) 83'	(Report)	Noble (yellow card) 25'	Attendance: 17,142; Referee: Alan Wiley

19 September 2009	Arsenal	4–0	Wigan Athletic	Emirates Stadium, London
15:00	Vermaelen 25', 49'; Eduardo 59'; Fàbregas 89'; Eboué (yellow card) 22'; Song (yellow card) 39'	(Report)	Gómez (yellow card) 53'; Scharner (yellow card) 65'	Attendance: 59,103; Referee: Mike Jones

26 September 2009	Wigan Athletic	3–1	Chelsea	DW Stadium, Wigan
15:00	Bramble 16'; Thomas (yellow card) 27'; Rodallega 53' (pen.); Scharner 90+1'	(Report)	Drogba 47'; Čech (red card) 51'	Attendance: 18,542; Referee: Phil Dowd

3 October 2009	Hull City	2–1	Wigan Athletic	KC Stadium, Kingston upon Hull
15:00	Vennegoor of Hesselink 60'; Geovanni 68'		Sinclair 87'; N'Zogbia (yellow card) 30'; Gómez (yellow card) 90+4'	Attendance: 18,542; Referee: Phil Dowd

18 October 2009	Wigan Athletic	1–1	Manchester City	DW Stadium, Wigan
16:00	N'Zogbia 45+1'; Thomas (yellow card) 26'; Figueroa (yellow card) 39'		Petrov 47'; Zabaleta (yellow card) 32' (yellow-red card) 65'	Attendance: 20,005; Referee: Alan Wiley

24 October 2009	Burnley	1–3	Wigan Athletic	Turf Moor, Burnley
16:00	Fletcher 3'		Rodallega 15', 50'; Boyce 75'	Attendance: 19,430; Referee: Lee Mason

31 October 2009	Portsmouth	4–0	Wigan Athletic	Fratton Park, Portsmouth
15:00	Dindane 35', 64', 90' (pen.); Piquionne 45+3'	(Report)	Thomas (yellow card) 90+2'	Attendance: 18,212; Referee: Alan Wiley

8 November 2009	Wigan Athletic	1–1	Fulham	DW Stadium, Wigan
15:00	Boyce 13'; Edman (yellow card) 54'; Bramble (yellow card) 84'	(Report)	Dempsey 39' (pen.); Etuhu (yellow card) 90'	Attendance: 16,172; Referee: Phil Dowd

22 November 2009	Tottenham Hotspur	9–1	Wigan Athletic	White Hart Lane, Tottenham
15:00	Crouch 9'; Kranjčar (yellow card) 40'; Defoe 51', 54', 58', 69', 87'; Lennon 64'; Bentley 88'; Kranjčar 90+4'	(Report)	Scharner 57'	Attendance: 35,650; Referee: Peter Walton

28 November 2009	Wigan Athletic	1–0	Sunderland	DW Stadium, Wigan
15:00	Rodallega 76'	(Report)	Turner (yellow card) 29'; Reid (yellow card) 79'; Bent (yellow card) 81'	Attendance: 20,447; Referee: Martin Atkinson

5 December 2009	Wigan Athletic	2–3	Birmingham City	DW Stadium, Wigan
15:00	Rodallega (yellow card) 15'; N'Zogbia 33'; Thomas (yellow card) 75'; Gómez 89'	(Report)	Larsson 61', 72'; Benítez 66'	Attendance: 18,797; Referee: Lee Probert

12 December 2009	Stoke City	2–2	Wigan Athletic	Britannia Stadium, Stoke-on-Trent
12:45	Faye (yellow card) 33'; Tuncay 37', (yellow card) 45'; Diao (yellow card) 57'; Shawcross 74'; Wilkinson (yellow card) 76'; Huth (yellow card) 90'	(Report)	Boyce 15'; Scharner (yellow card) 63'; Figueroa 72'	Attendance: 26,728; Referee: Mike Dean

16 December 2009	Liverpool	2–1	Wigan Athletic	Anfield, Liverpool
20:00	Ngog 9'; Mascherano (yellow card) 77'; Torres 79'	(Report)	Thomas (yellow card) 85'; N'Zogbia 90+2'	Attendance: 41,116; Referee: Phil Dowd

26 December 2009	Wigan Athletic	1–1	Blackburn Rovers	DW Stadium, Wigan
15:00	Rodallega 53'; Thomas (yellow card) 90+4'	(Report)	Salgado (yellow card) 15'; McCarthy 30'; Givet (yellow card) 38'; Chimbonda (yellow card) 44'; Nzonzi (yellow card) 86'	Attendance: 20,243; Referee: Mark Clattenburg

30 December 2009	Manchester United	5–0	Wigan Athletic	Old Trafford, Manchester
20:00	Rooney 28'; Carrick 32'; Rafael 45'; Berbatov 50'; Valencia 75'	(Report)	N'Zogbia (yellow card) 58'	Attendance: 74,560; Referee: Lee Mason

16 January 2010	Wolverhampton Wanderers	0–2	Wigan Athletic	Molineux Stadium, Wolverhampton
15:00	Stearman (yellow card) 13' (yellow-red card) 45'; Henry (yellow card) 70'; Ward (yellow card) 87'; Doyle (yellow card) 88'	(Report)	Thomas (yellow card) 14' (yellow-red card) 67'; McCarthy 60'; N'Zogbia 73', (yellow card) 73'; Gómez (yellow card) 90'	Attendance: 27,604; Referee: Howard Webb

27 January 2010	Blackburn Rovers	2–1	Wigan Athletic	Ewood Park, Blackburn
20:00	Pedersen 20'; Reid (yellow card) 59'; Kalinić 76'; Nzonzi (yellow card) 83'; Robinson (yellow card) 90'	(Report)	Caldwell 57'; Diamé (yellow card) 71'	Attendance: 22,190; Referee: Lee Mason

30 January 2010	Wigan Athletic	0–1	Everton	DW Stadium, Wigan
15:00		(Report)	Osman (yellow card) 58'; Pienaar (yellow card) 77'; Cahill 84'	Attendance: 16,869; Referee: Lee Probert

6 February 2010	Sunderland	1–1	Wigan Athletic	Stadium of Light, Sunderland
15:00	McCartney (yellow card) 44'; Jones 64', (yellow card) 85'; Cattermole (yellow card) 76'; Cana (yellow card) 90'	(Report)	Diamé 20'; Figueroa (yellow card) 43'; N'Zogbia (yellow card) 59'; Rodallega (yellow card) 78'; McCarthy (yellow card) 80'; Caldwell (yellow card) 90'	Attendance: 38,350; Referee: Stuart Attwell

9 February 2010	Wigan Athletic	1–1	Stoke City	DW Stadium, Wigan
19:45	Scharner 14'; Caldwell (yellow card) 33'; Rodallega (yellow card) 69'	(Report)	Shawcross (yellow card) 7'; Etherington (yellow card) 14'; Huth (yellow card) 45'; Tuncay 74'	Attendance: 16,033; Referee: Andre Marriner

17 February 2010	Wigan Athletic	0–0	Bolton Wanderers	DW Stadium, Wigan
20:00		(Report)	Muamba (yellow card) 82'	Attendance: 18,089; Referee: Howard Webb

21 February 2010	Wigan Athletic	0–3	Tottenham Hotspur	DW Stadium, Wigan
16:15	Diamé (yellow card) 65'; McCarthy (yellow card) 75'; Figueroa (yellow card) 90'	(Report)	Defoe 27', (yellow card) 40'; Bentley (yellow card) 37'; Dawson (yellow card) 51'; Huddlestone (yellow card) 72'; Pavlyuchenko 84', 90'	Attendance: 16,165; Referee: Alan Wiley

27 February 2010	Birmingham City	1–0	Wigan Athletic	St Andrew's, Birmingham
15:00	McFadden 45' (pen.); Ridgewell (yellow card) 90'	(Report)	N'Zogbia (yellow card) 39'; Rodallega (yellow card) 54'; Caldwell (yellow card) 70'	Attendance: 25,921; Referee: Anthony Taylor

8 March 2010	Wigan Athletic	1–0	Liverpool	DW Stadium, Wigan
20:00	Rodallega 35'; Bramble (yellow card) 40'	(Report)	Insua (yellow card) 22'; Lucas (yellow card) 29'; Kyrgiakos (yellow card) 33'; Torres (yellow card) 79'; Gerrard (yellow card) 82'	Attendance: 17,427; Referee: Andre Marriner

13 March 2010	Bolton Wanderers	4–0	Wigan Athletic	Reebok Stadium, Bolton
15:00	Elmander 10'; K. Davies 48' (pen.); Muamba 53'; Cohen (yellow card) 61'; Taylor 69'	(Report)	Scharner (yellow card) 35'; Diamé (yellow card) 73'	Attendance: 20,053; Referee: Mike Dean

16 March 2010	Wigan Athletic	1–2	Aston Villa	DW Stadium, Wigan
19:45	Bramble (yellow card) 23'; Caldwell 27'; Rodallega (yellow card) 36'	(Report)	McCarthy 25' (o.g.); Dunne (yellow card) 40'; Milner 63'	Attendance: 16,186; Referee: Steve Bennett

20 March 2010	Wigan Athletic	1–0	Burnley	DW Stadium, Wigan
15:00	Bramble (yellow card) 68'; Rodallega 90'	(Report)	McDonald (yellow card) 76'; Duff (yellow card) 80'; Mears (yellow card) 89'	Attendance: 18,498; Referee: Mike Jones

29 March 2010	Manchester City	3–0	Wigan Athletic	City of Manchester Stadium, Manchester
20:00	Garrido (yellow card) 61'; Zabaleta (yellow card) 67'; Tevez 72', 74', 84' (yellow card) 85'	(Report)	Caldwell (red card) 56'; Scharner (yellow card) 73'; Bramble (yellow card) 77'	Attendance: 43,534; Referee: Stuart Attwell

4 April 2010	Fulham	2–1	Wigan Athletic	Craven Cottage, London
15:00	Okaka 47' (yellow card) 85'; Hangeland 58'	(Report)	Scharner (yellow card) 12'; Scotland 34'; Figueroa (yellow card) 63'	Attendance: 22,730; Referee: Mark Clattenburg

14 April 2010	Wigan Athletic	0–0	Portsmouth	DW Stadium, Wigan
19:45	Bramble (yellow card) 30'; Scotland (yellow card) 79'	(Report)	Vanden Borre (yellow card) 90'	Attendance: 14,323; Referee: Mike Dean

18 April 2010	Wigan Athletic	3–2	Arsenal	DW Stadium, Wigan
13:30	Diamé (yellow card) 24'; Watson 80'; Bramble (yellow card) 68' (goal) 89'; N'Zogbia 90+1'	(Report)	Nasri (yellow card) 37'; Walcott 41'; Silvestre 48'	Attendance: 22,113; Referee: Lee Mason

24 April 2010	West Ham United	3–2	Wigan Athletic	Upton Park, London
15:00	Ilan 31'; Kováč 45'; Spector (yellow card) 58'; Parker 77'	(Report)	Spector 4' (o.g.); McCarthy (yellow card) 22'; Rodallega 52'; Bramble (yellow card) 71'	Attendance: 33,057; Referee: Alan Wiley

3 May 2010	Wigan Athletic	2–2	Hull City	DW Stadium, Wigan
13:30	Moses 30'; Gohouri (yellow card) 63', (goal) 90+3'; Melchiot (yellow card) 77'	(Report)	Atkinson 42'; Cullen 64'	Attendance: 20,242; Referee: Phil Dowd

9 May 2010	Chelsea	8–0	Wigan Athletic	Stamford Bridge, London
16:00	Anelka 6', 56'; Lampard 32' (pen.); Kalou 54' (yellow card) 55'; Drogba 63', 68' (pen.), 80', (yellow card) 74'; A. Cole 90'	(Report)	Caldwell (red card) 31'; Gohouri (yellow card) 41'; N'Zogbia (yellow card) 49'; Diamé (yellow card) 68'	Attendance: 41,383; Referee: Martin Atkinson

=== League Cup ===
26 August 2009 Second round	Blackpool	4–1	Wigan Athletic	Bloomfield Road, Blackpool
19:45	Demontagnac 3'; Burgess 19'; Adam 33'; Taylor-Fletcher 67'	(Report)	Amaya (yellow card) 39' (goal) 90+4'	Attendance: 8,089; Referee: Michael Oliver

=== FA Cup ===
2 January 2010 Third round	Wigan Athletic	4–1	Hull City	DW Stadium, Wigan
15:00	N'Zogbia 47', 66'; McCarthy 63'; Sinclair 90+1'	(Report)	Geovanni 35'; Cullen (yellow card) 67'	Attendance: 5,335; Referee: Andre Marriner

23 January 2010 Fourth round	Notts County	2–2	Wigan Athletic	Meadow Lane, Nottingham
15:00	Hughes 26', (yellow card) 51'; Jackson (yellow card) 39'; Davies 41'; Westcarr (yellow card) 43'	(Report)	Bramble (yellow card) 39'; Scotland 52'; Figueroa (yellow card) 64'; Watson 83'	Attendance: 9,073; Referee: Mark Clattenburg

2 February 2010 Fourth round Replay	Wigan Athletic	0–2	Notts County	DW Stadium, Wigan
19:45	Gómez (yellow card) 88'	(Report)	Ravenhill (yellow card) 36'; Hunt 75'; Caldwell 64' (o.g.)	Attendance: 5,159; Referee: Kevin Friend

== Final league table ==
Pos	Team	Pld	W	D	L	GF	GA	GD	Pts	Qualification or relegation
14	Bolton Wanderers	38	10	9	19	42	67	−25	39	
15	Wolverhampton Wanderers	38	9	11	18	32	56	−24	38	
16	Wigan Athletic	38	9	9	20	37	79	−42	36	
17	West Ham United	38	8	11	19	47	66	−19	35	
18	Burnley (R)	38	8	6	24	42	82	−40	30	Relegation to Football League Championship

Source: Barclays Premier League
(R) Relegated

== Player statistics ==
=== Premier League ===
(Sources)

#	Pos.	Player	Start	Sub	Total Apps	Goals	Yellow card	Red card
1	GK	(England) Chris Kirkland	32	0	32	0	0	0
2	DF	(Ivory Coast) Steve Gohouri	4	1	5	1	2	0
3	DF	(Sweden) Erik Edman	2	1	3	0	1	0
5	MF	(South Korea) Cho Won-hee	1	3	4	0	0	0
5	DF	(Scotland) Gary Caldwell	16	0	16	2	3	2
6	MF	(Honduras) Hendry Thomas	27	4	31	0	8	1
7	DF	(Austria) Paul Scharner	30	8	38	4	6	0
8	MF	(England) Ben Watson	4	1	5	1	0	0
9	FW	(Trinidad and Tobago) Jason Scotland	14	18	32	1	1	0
10	MF	(Wales) Jason Koumas	6	2	8	1	0	0
11	MF	(England) Michael Brown	2	0	2	0	0	0
11	FW	(England) Victor Moses	2	12	14	1	0	0
12	GK	(England) Mike Pollitt	2	2	4	0	0	0
14	MF	(France) Charles N'Zogbia	35	1	36	5	7	0
15	MF	(Spain) Jordi Gómez	11	12	23	1	3	0
16	FW	(England) Scott Sinclair	1	17	18	1	0	0
17	DF	(Barbados) Emmerson Boyce	23	1	24	3	1	0
18	FW	(Bolivia) Marcelo Moreno	9	3	12	0	0	0
19	DF	(England) Titus Bramble	35	0	35	2	10	0
20	FW	(Colombia) Hugo Rodallega	38	0	38	10	6	0
23	MF	(France) Olivier Kapo	0	1	1	0	0	0
24	MF	(Republic of Ireland) James McCarthy	19	1	20	1	3	0
25	DF	(Netherlands) Mario Melchiot	32	0	32	0	2	0
27	MF	(France) Mohamed Diamé	34	0	34	1	5	0
29	GK	(Serbia) Vladimir Stojković	4	0	4	0	0	0
30	FW	(Jamaica) Marlon King	0	3	3	0	0	0
31	DF	(Honduras) Maynor Figueroa	35	0	35	1	6	0
