= Greg Luer =

English footballer

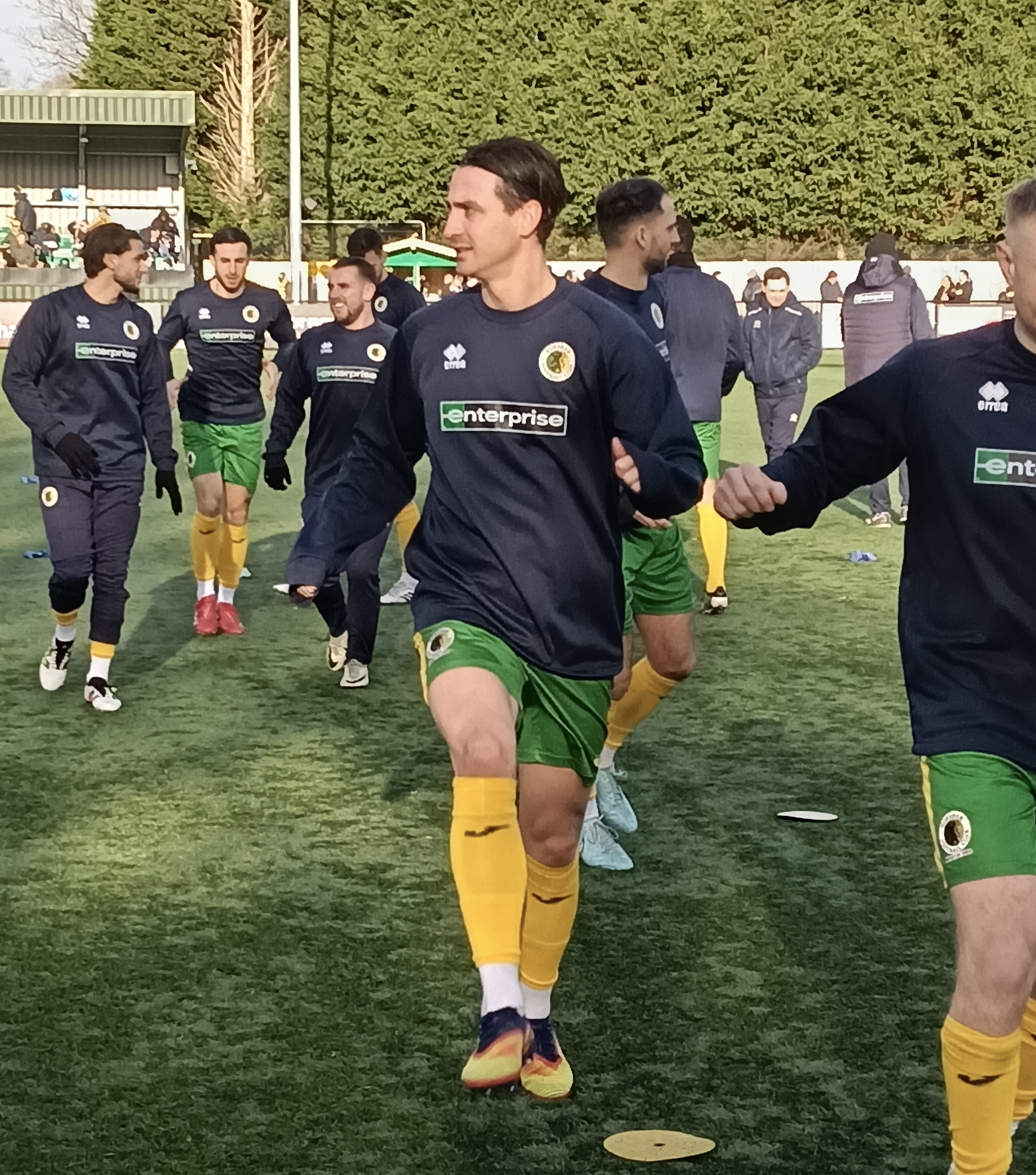
- Luer warming up for Horsham in 2026

Personal information
- Full name: Gregory Roland Luer
- Date of birth: 6 December 1994 (age 31)
- Place of birth: Brighton, England
- Height: 5 ft 11 in (1.80 m)
- Position: Forward

Team information
- Current team: Horsham

Youth career
- Hove Rivervale
- Whitehawk
- Eastbourne Borough

Senior career*
Years	Team	Apps	(Gls)
2012–2015	Burgess Hill Town (Note: Source only covers 2013–14 and 2014–15 seasons, and has no breakdown of cup appearances by competition.)	48+	(18+)
2015–2018	Hull City	3	(0)
2015	→ Port Vale (loan)	2	(0)
2016	→ Scunthorpe United (loan)	4	(0)
2016	→ Stevenage (loan)	10	(0)
2018	→ Maidstone United (loan)	6	(0)
2018–2019	Woking	33	(9)
2019–2023	Eastbourne Borough	108	(20)
2023–2024	Worthing	29	(1)
2024	Whitehawk	12	(0)
2025	Horsham	9	(0)
2025	Three Bridges	5	(0)
2025–	Horsham	56	(8)
- * Club domestic league appearances and goals as of 19:30, 21 November 2026 (UTC)

Gregory Roland Luer (born 6 December 1994) is an English semi-professional footballer who plays as a forward for National League South club Horsham.

Luer began as a youth player with Hove Rivervale, Whitehawk and Eastbourne Borough, before playing first-team football at Burgess Hill Town, where he earned a move to Hull City in January 2015. He was loaned out to Port Vale the following month, and in the 2015–16 season, was loaned out to Scunthorpe United and Stevenage. He joined Maidstone United on loan for the latter part of the 2017–18 season. Following his release from Hull, he joined Woking in July 2018. He joined Eastbourne Borough for a three-year stint in June 2019, after which time he signed with Worthing before rejoining Whitehawk. He later played for Horsham and Three Bridges.

== Career ==
=== Early career ===
Luer had played youth football for Hove Rivervale, Whitehawk and Eastbourne Borough, before he was spotted playing Isthmian League for Burgess Hill Town by Hull scout Dean White. Burgess manager Ian Chapman handed him his debut at age 17, and recommended him to his former club Brighton & Hove Albion.

=== Hull City ===
He was signed by Premier League club Hull City in January 2015. Later that month he was loaned out to League One side Port Vale. He made his debut in the English Football League at Vale Park on 7 February, coming on for Richard Duffy 86 minutes into a 2–2 draw with Bradford City. He returned to Hull after only one further substitute appearance.

Luer made his debut for Hull City on the opening day of the 2015–16 season when he came on as a substitute for Chuba Akpom in a 2–0 win over Huddersfield Town at the KC Stadium. He scored his first goal for the "Tigers" in the League Cup on 11 August, scoring in a 2–2 draw with Accrington Stanley, and then went on to convert the opening penalty of Hull's subsequent penalty shoot-out victory. He scored the only goal of the following round two weeks later to take Hull through at home to Rochdale.

On 9 February 2016, Luer moved on a month-long loan spell on League One side Scunthorpe United. He made one start and three substitute appearances for the "Iron", before returning to Hull City despite reports that Scunthorpe manager Nick Daws was looking to extend the loan deal. On 12 March 2016, Luer moved on a month-long loan to League Two side Stevenage. He impressed in his first five games for the club and the loan deal was extended until the end of the 2015–16 season. He made one appearance during the 2016–17 season, playing the first 57 minutes of a 3–1 victory over Exeter City in the EFL Cup second round before he was sidelined with a knee injury picked up during the game.

Speaking in January 2018, Luer said that the arrival of new manager Nigel Adkins had given him a fresh start at the club, as he made a cameo appearance in Adkins's first game in charge and went on to score a hat-trick for the reserves. On 19 March 2018, Luer moved on loan to National League side Maidstone United until the end of the 2017–18 season. He was released by Hull at the end of the 2017–18 season.

=== Woking ===
On 14 July 2018, Luer signed with National League South club Woking after impressing manager Alan Dowson over a trial period. On 7 August 2018, Luer made his Woking debut during their 2–1 home victory over St Albans City, featuring for 72 minutes before being replaced by Paul Hodges. A month later, he went onto score his first goal for the club during a 1–1 draw with Concord Rangers, opening the scoring in the 29th minute. Following a slow start, with only one goal in 14 league games, Luer went onto net Woking's third in a 3–1 home win over rivals, Hampton & Richmond Borough and scored a hat-trick in their reverse fixture six days later. He ended the 2018–19 season with nine goals in 39 appearances, though was not in the matchday squad as the "Cardinals" secured promotion with victory over Welling United in the play-off final.

=== Eastbourne Borough ===
On 19 June 2019, Luer rejoined Eastbourne Borough; "Sports" manager Lee Bradbury admitted he tried to sign Luer whilst manager of Havant & Waterlooville in the previous season. He scored 11 goals in 38 appearances during the 2019–20 season and scored five goals in 22 games in the 2020–21 season. Both campaigns were ended early due to the COVID-19 pandemic in England. He made 43 appearances in the 2021–22 campaign, scoring six goals, featuring once in the play-offs as a substitute. He agreed a new contract in the summer. He scored six goals in thirty games during the 2022–23 campaign.

=== Worthing ===
On 28 June 2023, Luer signed a two-year contract with National League South side Worthing. Manager Adam Hinshelwood praised his versatility and was also pleased that the player was from the local area. He played 29 league games in the 2023–24 season. He agreed to leave the club after mutually terminating his contract on 5 July 2024.

=== Isthmian League ===
On 15 July 2024, Luer rejoined Whitehawk in the Isthmian League Premier Division but terminated his contract by mutual consent on 13 November 2024 after 13 appearances. In March 2025, Luer joined Isthmian South East Division side Three Bridges following a short spell in the Premier Division with Horsham.

=== Return to Horsham ===
On 21 July 2025, Luer agreed to return to Horsham following their promotion to the National League South ahead of the 2025–26 campaign. On 31 July, he scored the first goal in a 2–0 win against Hassocks, helping Horsham to win the Sussex Community Shield. Days later, on 3 August, Luer scored the final goal of a 6–0 victory over Billericay Town as Horsham won the Isthmian League Charity Shield. On 16 August, he scored his first league goal for Horsham against his former club Worthing. He ended the season having scored six goals in 52 appearances.

On 8 August 2026, Luer scored the equaliser in a 1–1 away draw with Torquay United, which was the first goal of Horsham's 2026–27 campaign.

== Career statistics ==
As of match played 21 November 2026

Appearances and goals by club, season and competition
Club	Season	League			FA Cup		League Cup		Other		Total	
Club	Season	Division	Apps	Goals	Apps	Goals	Apps	Goals	Apps	Goals	Apps	Goals
Burgess Hill Town	2013–14	Isthmian League; Division One South	27	6	3	4	—		2 (Note: Appearance(s) in Isthmian League Cup)	2	32	12
Burgess Hill Town	2014–15	Isthmian League; Division One South	21	12	5	3	—		7	1	33	16
Burgess Hill Town	Total		48	18	8	7	0	0	9	3	65	28
Hull City	2014–15	Premier League	0	0	0	0	0	0	—		0	0
Hull City	2015–16	Championship	2	0	1	0	3	2	0	0	6	2
Hull City	2016–17	Premier League	0	0	0	0	1	0	—		1	0
Hull City	2017–18	Championship	1	0	0	0	1	0	—		2	0
Hull City	Total		3	0	1	0	5	2	0	0	9	2
Port Vale (loan)	2014–15	League One	2	0	—		—		—		2	0
Scunthorpe United (loan)	2015–16	League One	4	0	—		—		—		4	0
Stevenage (loan)	2015–16	League Two	10	0	—		—		—		10	0
Maidstone United (loan)	2017–18	National League	6	0	—		—		—		6	0
Woking	2018–19	National League South	33	9	3	0	—		3 (Note: Two appearances in FA Trophy, one in National League South play-offs)	0	39	9
Eastbourne Borough	2019–20	National League South	30	9	2	0	—		6 (Note: Two appearances in FA Trophy, four appearances and two goals in Sussex Senior Cup)	2	38	11
Eastbourne Borough	2020–21	National League South	17	2	4	2	—		1 (Note: Appearance(s) in FA Trophy)	1	22	5
Eastbourne Borough	2021–22	National League South	36	5	3	0	—		4 (Note: Two appearances and one goal in FA Trophy, one appearance in Sussex Senior Cup, one appearance in National League South play-offs)	1	43	6
Eastbourne Borough	2022–23	National League South	25	4	2	0	—		3 (Note: Two appearances in FA Trophy, one appearance and two goals in Sussex Senior Cup)	2	30	6
Eastbourne Borough	Total		108	20	11	2	0	0	14	6	133	28
Worthing	2023–24	National League South	29	1	1	0	—		1	0	31	1
Whitehawk	2024–25	Isthmian League; Premier Division	12	0	0	0	—		1	0	13	0
Horsham	2024–25	Isthmian League; Premier Division	9	0	0	0	—		0	0	9	0
Three Bridges	2024–25	Isthmian League; South East Division	5	0	0	0	—		0	0	5	0
Horsham	2025–26	National League South	41	3	3	1	—		8 (Note: Five appearances in the FA Trophy, three appearances and two goals in the Sussex Senior Cup)	2	52	6
Horsham	2026–27	National League South	15	5	1	0	—		1	0	17	5
Horsham	Total		56	8	4	1	0	0	9	2	69	11
Career total			325	56	28	10	5	2	37	11	395	79

== Honours ==
Horsham

- Sussex Community Shield: 2025
- Isthmian League Charity Shield: 2025
