= Mohamed Diamé =

French-Senegalese footballer (born 1987)

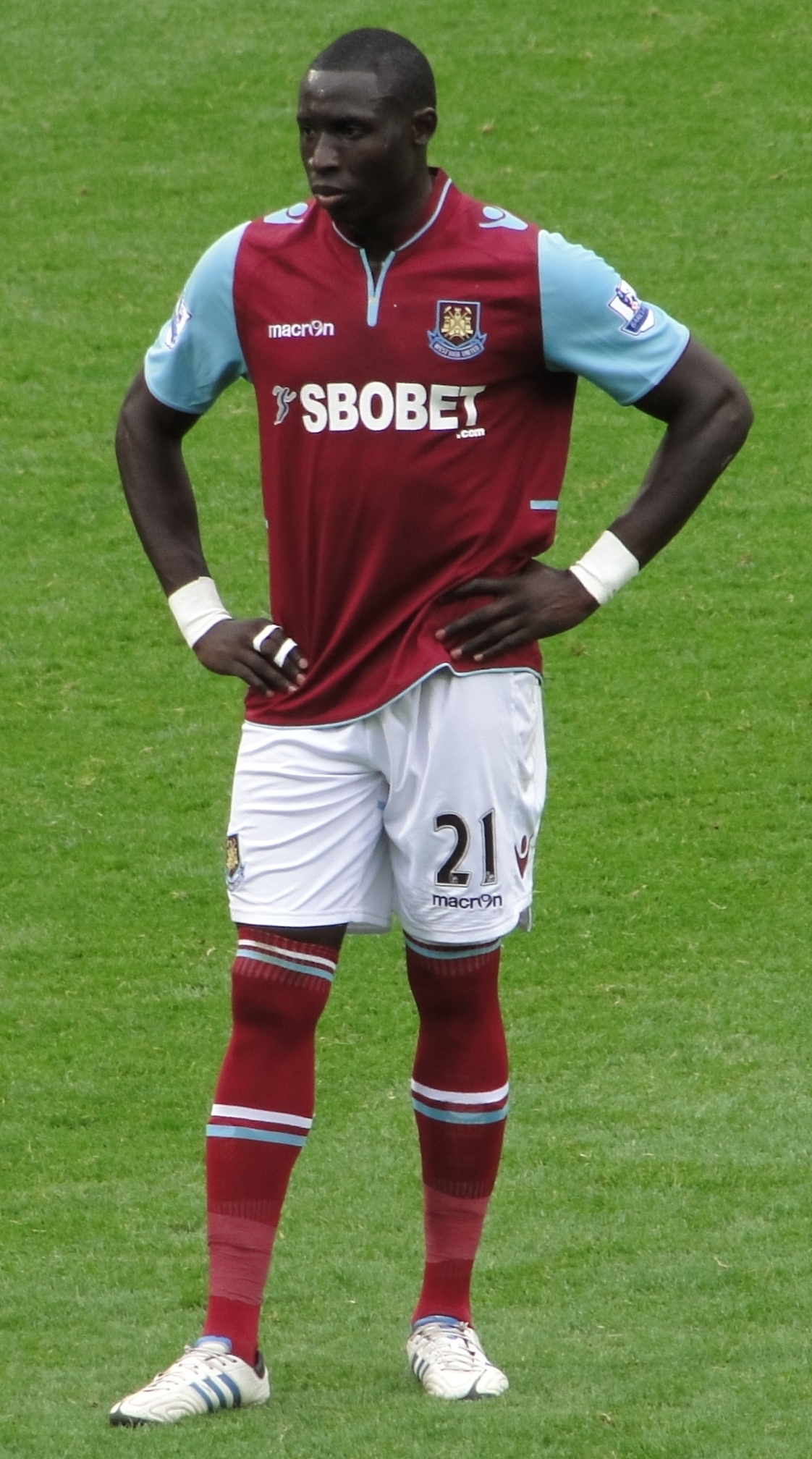
- Diamé playing for West Ham United in 2012

Personal information
- Full name: Mohamed Diamé
- Date of birth: 14 June 1987 (age 39)
- Place of birth: Créteil, France
- Height: 1.84 m (6 ft 0 in)
- Position: Midfielder

Youth career
- 2000–2003: Clairefontaine
- 2003–2005: Lens

Senior career*
Years	Team	Apps	(Gls)
2005–2007	Lens B	28	(1)
2007–2008	Linares	31	(1)
2008–2009	Rayo Vallecano	35	(1)
2009–2012	Wigan Athletic	96	(5)
2012–2014	West Ham United	71	(7)
2014–2016	Hull City	50	(13)
2016–2019	Newcastle United	97	(5)
2019–2021	Al-Ahli	41	(0)
2022–2023	Fuenlabrada	20	(0)
2023–2024	Al-Sailiya	13	(0)
Total		482	(33)

International career^{‡}
2012	Senegal Olympic	4	(0)
2011–2017	Senegal	31	(1)
- * Club domestic league appearances and goals as of 10:01, 6 October 2024 (UTC) ‡ National team caps and goals as of 08:19, 14 January 2018 (UTC)

Mohamed Diamé (born 14 June 1987), also known as Momo Diamé, is a former professional footballer who played as a midfielder.

Though born in France, Diamé represented Senegal at international level and made 31 appearances before retiring from national duty in 2017.

== Club career ==
=== Early career ===
Diamé was born in the Paris suburb of Créteil and he was selected to attend the Clairefontaine academy between 2000 and 2003. Diamé began his professional career in 2003 with Lens, but left four years later after facing health problems. After a full recovery, he signed for lowly Spanish side Linares on 30 July 2007, and moved to Rayo Vallecano the following year, helping the Madrid-based team to a mid-table position in the Segunda División, after being promoted in the 2007–08 season. During his time with Rayo, it was reported that La Liga clubs Real Madrid and Barcelona were interested in signing the midfielder, as well as Premier League side Arsenal.

=== Wigan Athletic ===
On 22 August 2009, Diamé joined Wigan Athletic, signing a three-year contract. The transfer had earlier been temporarily put on hold, after alleged heart problems were found. Diamé made his debut the same day as his transfer, in a 5–0 defeat to Manchester United. He scored his first goal for Wigan against Sunderland on 6 February 2010. At the end of the 2011–12 season, he left Wigan after declining their offer to extend his contract.

=== West Ham United ===
On 20 June 2012, Diamé joined West Ham United, signing a three-year contract. Diamé made his debut for West Ham on 18 August 2012 in a 1–0 win against Aston Villa. He scored his first goal for West Ham United in the 3–1 defeat to Arsenal on 6 October 2012. His second goal for the club was scored in the 3–1 victory over Chelsea on 1 December 2012. On 9 December 2012, Diamé was injured in a match against Liverpool; it was initially thought he could be out for up to three months. In January 2013, after a number of clubs were reported to be interested in signing him, Diamé stated that he wished to stay with West Ham. Diamé did not leave the club in the transfer window, and manager Sam Allardyce stated that it was an important decision.

=== Hull City ===
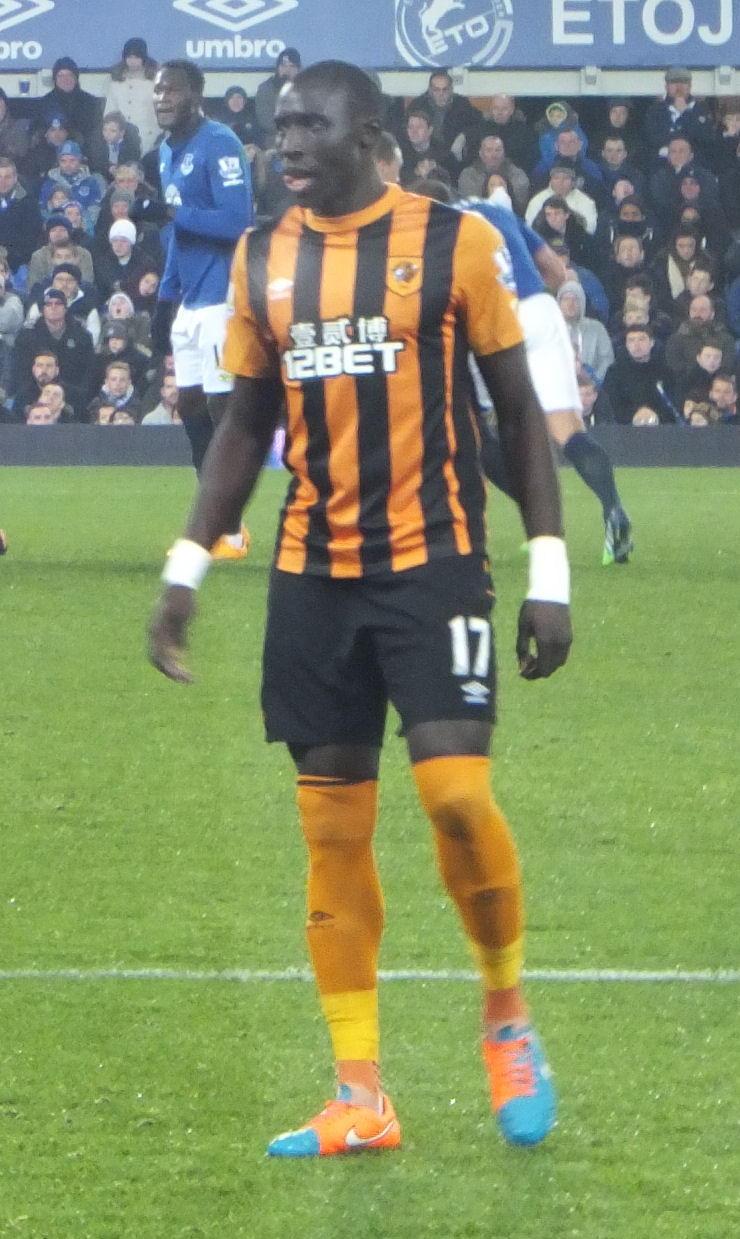
Diame playing for Hull City in 2014 against Everton

On 1 September 2014, Diamé joined Hull City, signing a three-year contract. Two weeks later, he made his debut at the KC Stadium, scoring against his former club West Ham in a 2–2 draw.

On 28 May 2016, Diamé scored in the Championship play-off final in a 1–0 win against Sheffield Wednesday, giving Hull an immediate return to the Premier League after their relegation in the 2014–15 season.

=== Newcastle United ===
On 3 August 2016, Diamé joined Newcastle United, signing a three-year contract. Diamé scored his first goals for Newcastle when he scored twice in an EFL Cup win against Preston North End on 25 October 2016.

In October 2017, he had a training ground fight with teammate Jamaal Lascelles. The two players later apologised and offered to take the entire first team squad and staff out for lunch.

He was released by Newcastle upon the expiry of his contract at the end of the 2018–19 season.

=== Al Ahli ===
On 11 July 2019, Diamé joined Qatari side Al-Ahli on a two-year contract.

=== Fuenlabrada ===
On 8 April 2022, Diamé signed a contract with Spanish second level side Fuenlabrada until the end of the season. In January 2023, Diamé had his contract terminated by mutual consent.

=== Al Sailiya ===
On 17 January 2023, Diamé joined Qatari side Al-Sailiya on a half-year contract.

== International career ==
On 22 March 2011, Diamé was called up to play for Senegal, for whom he qualifies as his father was born in Dakar. Diamé made his international debut later that month.

In July 2012, Diamé was announced as one of three over-age players in Senegal's squad for the 2012 Olympics. He scored his first international goal for Senegal on 26 March 2016 in a 2–0 win against Niger in a 2017 Africa Cup of Nations qualification match.

He retired from international football in March 2017.

== Personal life ==
Diamé is Muslim.

== Career statistics ==
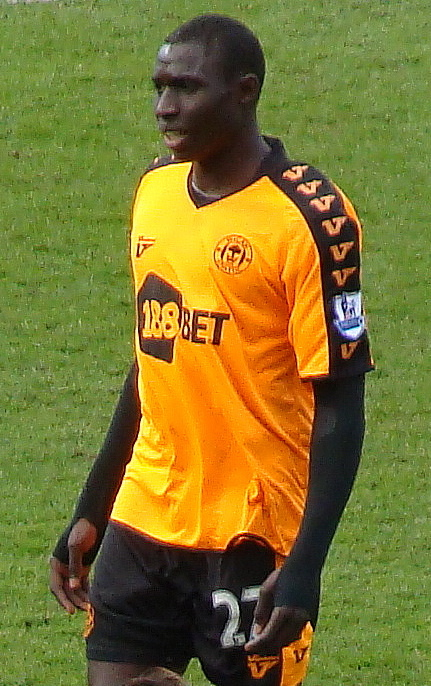
Diame playing for Wigan Athletic in 2010

=== Club ===
As of 18 May 2019

Appearances and goals by club, season and competition
Club	Season	League			National Cup		League Cup		Other		Total	
Club	Season	Division	Apps	Goals	Apps	Goals	Apps	Goals	Apps	Goals	Apps	Goals
Lens B	2005–06	CFA	28	1	—		—		—		28	1
Lens B	2006–07	CFA	0	0	—		—		—		0	0
Lens B	Total		28	1	—		—		—		28	1
Linares	2007–08	Segunda División B	31	1	1	1	—		1 (Note: Appearance in Segunda División B play-offs)	0	33	2
Rayo Vallecano	2008–09	Segunda División	35	1	2	0	—		—		37	1
Wigan Athletic	2009–10	Premier League	34	1	2	0	1	0	—		37	1
Wigan Athletic	2010–11	Premier League	36	1	3	2	1	0	—		40	3
Wigan Athletic	2011–12	Premier League	26	3	0	0	0	0	—		26	3
Wigan Athletic	Total		96	5	5	2	2	0	—		103	7
West Ham United	2012–13	Premier League	33	3	1	0	0	0	—		34	3
West Ham United	2013–14	Premier League	35	4	0	0	6	0	—		41	4
West Ham United	2014–15	Premier League	3	0	0	0	1	0	—		4	0
West Ham United	Total		71	7	1	0	7	0	—		79	7
Hull City	2014–15	Premier League	12	4	0	0	0	0	—		12	4
Hull City	2015–16	Championship	38	9	1	0	3	0	3 (Note: Appearances in Championship play-offs)	1	45	10
Hull City	Total		50	13	1	0	3	0	3	1	57	14
Newcastle United	2016–17	Championship	37	3	0	0	4	3	—		41	6
Newcastle United	2017–18	Premier League	31	2	1	0	1	0	—		33	2
Newcastle United	2018–19	Premier League	29	0	0	0	0	0	—		29	0
Newcastle United	Total		97	5	1	0	5	3	0	0	103	8
Career total			408	33	11	3	17	3	4	1	440	40

=== International ===
Appearances and goals by national team and year
National team	Year	Apps	Goals
Senegal	2011	5	0
Senegal	2012	8	0
Senegal	2013	5	0
Senegal	2014	5	0
Senegal	2015	1	0
Senegal	2016	5	1
Senegal	2017	2	0
Total		31	1

As of 25 September 2016
Scores and results list Senegal's goal tally first, score column indicates score after each Diamé goal.

List of international goals scored by Mohamed Diamé
No.	Date	Venue	Opponent	Score	Result	Competition
1	26 March 2016	Stade Léopold Sédar Senghor, Dakar, Senegal	Niger	1–0	2–0	2017 Africa Cup of Nations qualification

== Honours ==
Hull City

- Football League Championship play-offs: 2016

Newcastle United

- EFL Championship: 2016–17
