= Michael Dawson (footballer) =

English former footballer

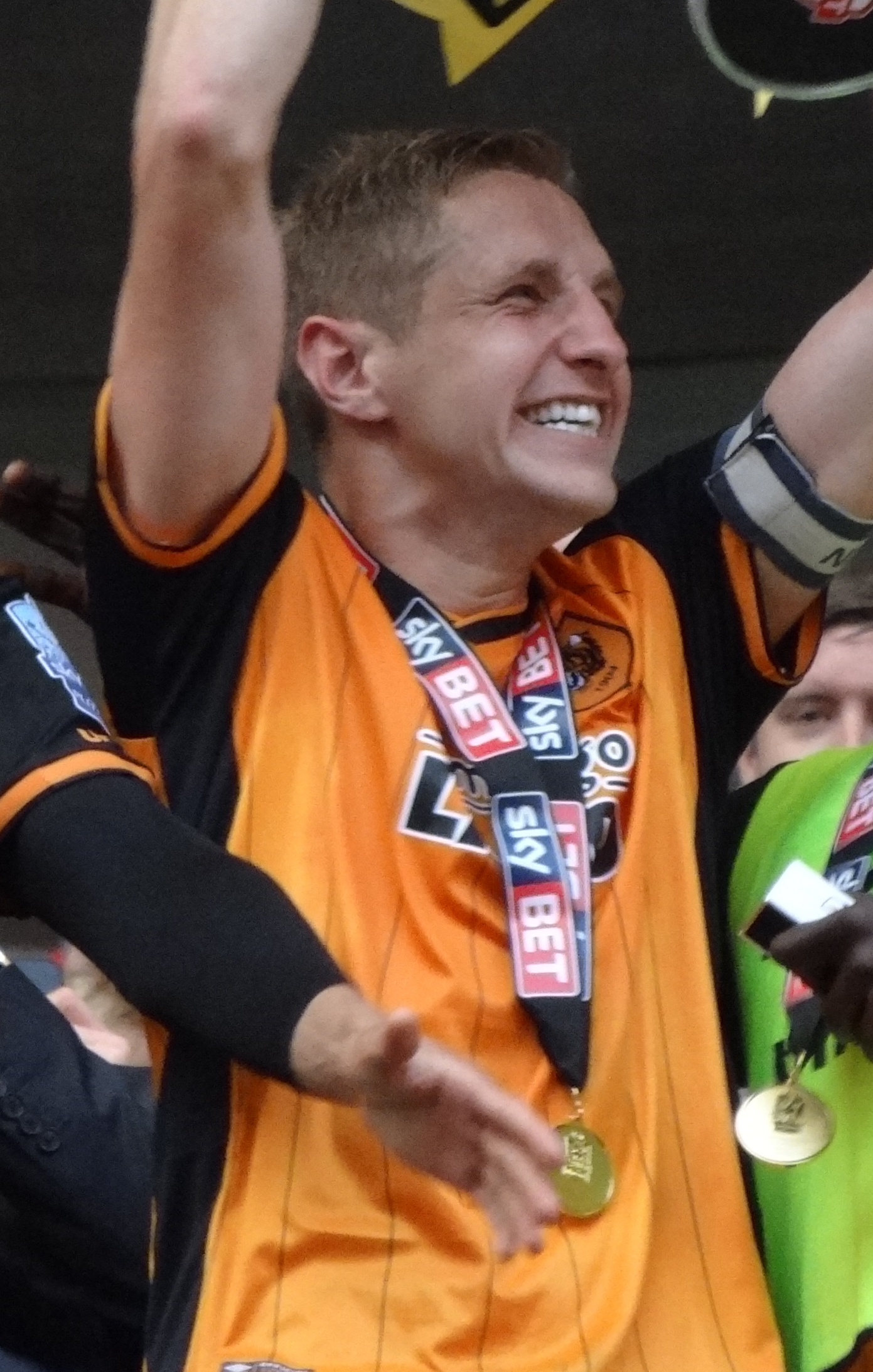
- Dawson in 2016

Personal information
- Full name: Michael Richard Dawson
- Date of birth: 18 November 1983 (age 42)
- Place of birth: Northallerton, England
- Height: 6 ft 2 in (1.88 m)
- Position: Centre back

Youth career
- 1997–2001: Nottingham Forest

Senior career*
Years	Team	Apps	(Gls)
2001–2005	Nottingham Forest	83	(7)
2005–2014	Tottenham Hotspur	236	(7)
2014–2018	Hull City	122	(8)
2018–2021	Nottingham Forest	28	(1)
Total		469	(23)

International career
2003–2005	England U21	13	(0)
2006–2007	England B	2	(0)
2010–2011	England	4	(0)
- * Club domestic league appearances and goals

Michael Richard Dawson (born 18 November 1983) is an English former professional football player and sports pundit.

As a player, he was a centre back. Dawson started his career at Nottingham Forest playing alongside veteran defender Des Walker before moving to Tottenham Hotspur with teammate Andy Reid for a fee of £8 million. While at Tottenham, Dawson won the League Cup in 2008. His form in the 2009–10 season saw him included in England's preliminary 2010 FIFA World Cup squad. Although he initially failed to make the final 23-man squad, an injury to captain Rio Ferdinand saw him drafted in as replacement.

In August 2014, Hull City signed Dawson from Tottenham for a fee believed to be £3.5 million. Although relegated with Hull at the end of the 2014–15 season, he helped them return to the Premier League when they beat Sheffield Wednesday in the 2016 Championship play-off final. After 4 years at Hull, he returned to former club Nottingham Forest in May 2018, where he retired in 2021. He is now a regular pundit for Sky Sports.

== Early life ==
Born in Northallerton, North Yorkshire, Dawson grew up in Leyburn and attended Wensleydale school. He is the younger brother of fellow footballers Andy Dawson and Kevin Dawson.

== Club career ==
=== Nottingham Forest ===
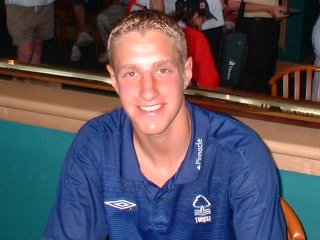
Dawson with Nottingham Forest in 2002

Dawson started his career playing for his local team, Brompton Juniors, and also spent a year playing for Richmond before signing as a junior professional with Nottingham Forest at the age of 14. He turned professional in November 2000 and made his first-team debut for Forest on 1 April 2002 against Walsall in a 3–2 home defeat.

In February 2003, Dawson signed a new five-and-a-half-year contract at Forest. During the 2002–03 season, Dawson established himself in the team alongside veteran defender Des Walker, as Forest finished sixth in the First Division to enter the play-offs. Forest played Sheffield United, and Dawson was sent off late in the first leg, making it his final appearance that season. Without Dawson, Forest lost 4–3 in the second leg of the semi-final, being eliminated 5–4 on aggregate.

In the close season, Dawson contracted glandular fever whilst on duty with the England under-21s, causing him to miss the start of the 2003–04 season. Forest also struggled – winning only twice between the end of September and the beginning of February caused Paul Hart to be replaced by Joe Kinnear. The season was transformed from one battling relegation to a confident mid-table finish with the return of Dawson and David Johnson to the team being one of the reasons for this.

=== Tottenham Hotspur ===
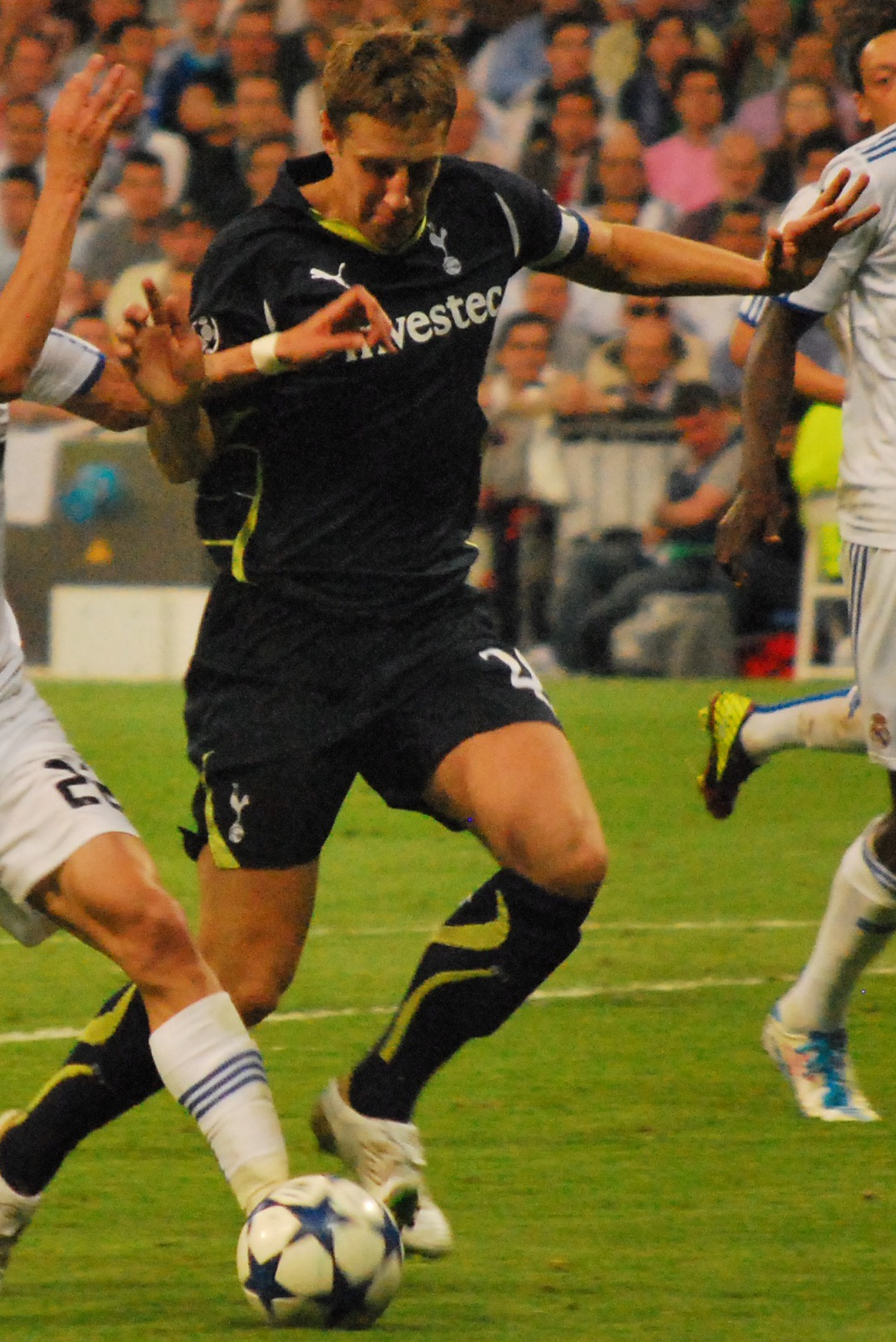
Dawson playing for Tottenham Hotspur in 2011

Dawson and one of his Forest teammates, winger Andy Reid, signed for Premier League club Tottenham Hotspur on 31 January 2005 deadline day transfer for a fee thought to be worth a combined £8 million. Dawson made his debut for Tottenham towards the end of the 2004–05 season in the 2–2 draw at Liverpool on 16 April 2005.

Dawson enjoyed a good 2005–06 season, impressing many with his aerial ability and attitude. This in turn led to a contract extension until 2011. This was followed by a call-up to the England squad as a standby player for the 2006 FIFA World Cup.

On 5 November 2006, Dawson scored his first goal for Tottenham in their 2–1 win over Chelsea at White Hart Lane. His goal levelled the score at 1–1 after Claude Makélélé's strike, with Aaron Lennon scoring the winner. Dawson first captained the team in the 2006–07 FA Cup quarter-final match away to Chelsea, due to injuries to stand-in captains Robbie Keane and Paul Robinson and the club's regular captain Ledley King. After a season in which he played all but one of Tottenham's 59 matches, he was rewarded with a new five-year contract on 11 May 2007 which would have kept him at the club until 2012.

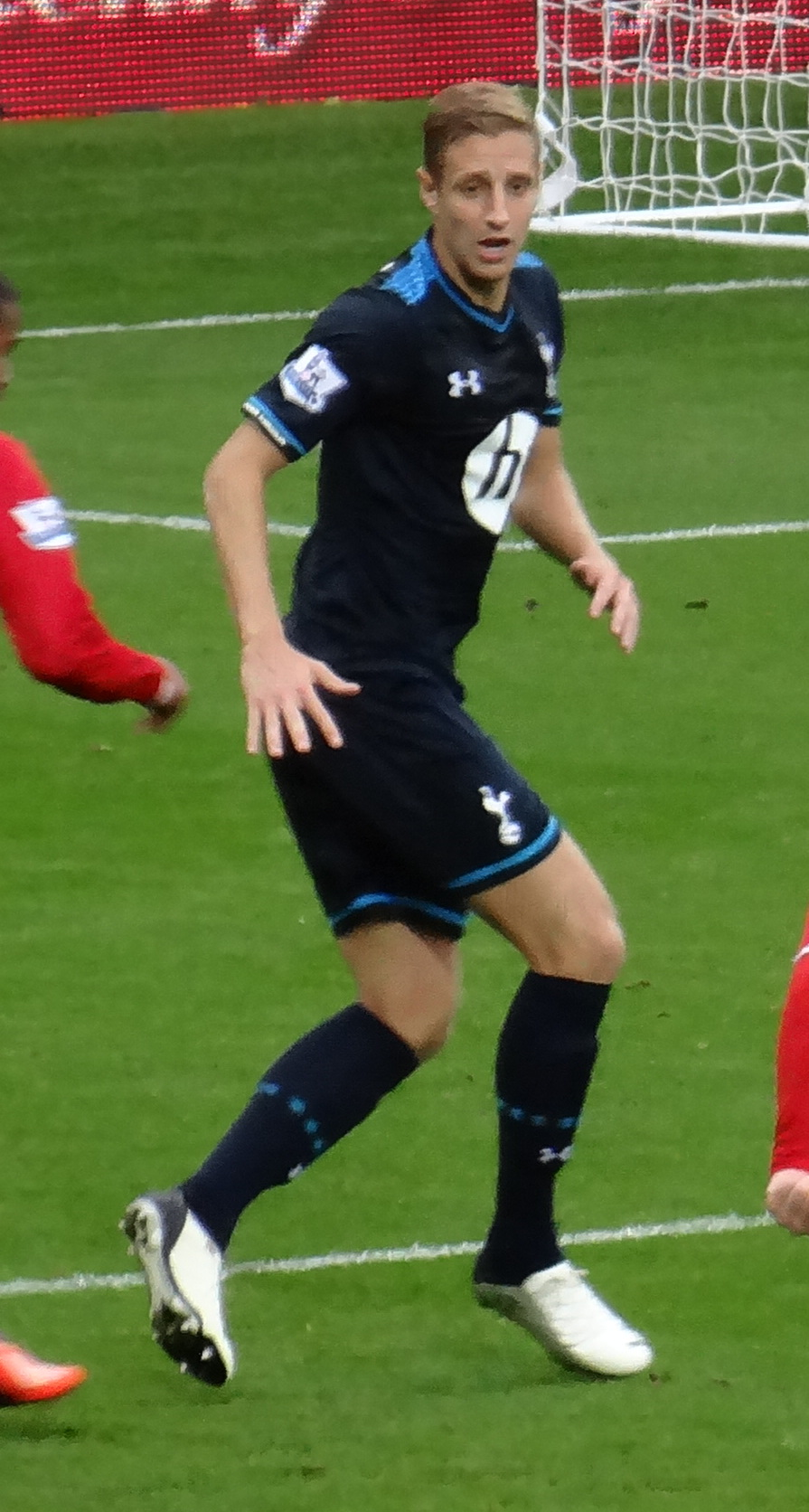
Dawson playing for Tottenham Hotspur in 2013

In the 2007–08 season, Dawson scored his first goal in the UEFA Cup home match against the Cypriot team Anorthosis Famagusta where Tottenham won 6–1. In November 2007, Tottenham went away to West Ham United in the Premier League and drew 1–1, Dawson scored the away goal. During the course of the season, Tottenham reached the 2008 League Cup Final at Wembley Stadium, where they beat Chelsea 2–1 to earn Dawson his first ever silverware, though he missed the final through injury.

In October 2008, when Tottenham played away to Stoke, Vedran Ćorluka suffered an injury in the 77th minute. Dawson replaced him only to be sent off in injury time. In March 2009, Tottenham reached the League Cup final again and faced Manchester United. Dawson was available and was selected for the final which ended 0–0 after 90 minutes. However, Tottenham lost 4–1 on penalties. In April 2009, Dawson sustained an injury against Newcastle United which left him out for the rest of the 2008–09 season. The 2009–10 season was to be judged by many as Dawson's finest season in a Spurs shirt to date as he helped the club to a fourth-place finish, their highest league finish for 20 years and qualification for the 2010–11 UEFA Champions League.

On 27 January 2010, he signed a new five-year contract with Tottenham, taking him to 2015. Dawson's excellent performances throughout the course of the season saw him awarded Tottenham's Player of the Year award. His form that season led to Manchester City striker Carlos Tevez calling him "the best English defender I have played against" due to his strength. Dawson missed the rest of the 2011–12 season after rupturing an ankle ligament during Tottenham's 3–1 FA Cup fifth round win over Stevenage on 7 March 2012.

At the beginning of the 2012–13 season, Dawson could have signed for Tottenham's Premier League rivals Queens Park Rangers as the two clubs had agreed a £7.5 million fee, but the move collapsed as Dawson had "an issue with personal terms". Instead, Dawson was appointed club captain and signed a new three-year contract with Tottenham in October 2013. He scored his first goal of the season in a 3–1 win over Reading at White Hart Lane on 1 January 2013.

=== Hull City ===
On 26 August 2014, he joined Premier League club Hull City on a three-year contract for an undisclosed fee understood to be £3.5 million. He made his debut on 31 August 2014 at Villa Park in a 2–1 defeat to Aston Villa. During the course of the 2014–15 season, Dawson established himself in the team and was selected captain on 17 occasions. With five matches left to go in the Premier League season, Hull played Liverpool, in which Dawson scored his first goal for the club and the only goal in the match, earning a vital three points in their fight against relegation. However, this was not enough as Hull went on to lose their next three matches and in their final match against Manchester United they only drew 0–0, sending Dawson and Hull to the Championship for next season.

Dawson scored in their home match against Queens Park Rangers on 19 September 2015. The 2015–16 season saw Hull finish fourth in the table and were promoted back to the Premier League via the play-offs, beating Sheffield Wednesday 1–0 at Wembley Stadium in the final.

At the start of the 2016–17 season, Dawson picked up an injury in a pre-season friendly against Mansfield Town, which ruled him out for three months.

At the end of the 2017–18 season, he entered into discussions with Hull about a new contract.

=== Return to Nottingham Forest ===
Dawson re-signed for Championship club Nottingham Forest on 30 May 2018 on a two-year contract, and has since served as club captain. He scored his first goal since his return to the City Ground on 17 August 2019 in a 3-0 win over Birmingham City Forest manager Sabri Lamouchi praised Dawson's attitude and leadership, saying "I have never seen in my professional life one guy who is this clever, who has the background he has and who is as professional and positive as him". On 17 June 2020, he signed an additional one-year contract with Forest.

Dawson made no appearances for Forest during the 2020-21 season, and was released by Forest at the end of his contract. Dawson said: "It's been frustrating that I haven't been able to say goodbye to the fans in person but I hope to be back at the City Ground again very soon. Forest has been a massive part of my life since I first put the shirt on at the age of 9. It will always be close to my heart and I leave with some fantastic memories."

=== Post-retirement ===
In August 2021, Dawson returned to Tottenham Hotspur as a club ambassador. In September, he joined Sky Sports as a pundit, contributing to the punditry panel for Soccer Saturday.

== International career ==
=== England U21 ===
Dawson made his debut for the English under-21 team against Italy on 11 February 2003. He went on to earn 13 England under-21 international caps, captaining the team on several occasions. His last appearance for the under-21 team was in a 2–1 loss to France on 15 November 2005.

=== England B ===
Dawson was capped twice for the English B team, his first cap coming in their 2–1 loss to Belarus at Reading's Madejski Stadium on 25 May 2006. His second cap came in their 3–1 win over Albania at Burnley's Turf Moor ground exactly a year later.

=== England senior team ===
Dawson was named in England's 30-man provisional squad for the 2010 FIFA World Cup, but was not selected for the final 23-man squad. Rio Ferdinand was withdrawn from the squad due to an injury sustained in the team's first training session, and Capello announced Dawson as Ferdinand's replacement. He made his first appearance for England in a warm-up match against the Platinum Stars; however, the match was not counted as a full international, merely a training match, so he did not receive a cap for his appearance. However, Capello did not use Dawson at the World Cup, and he was the only uncapped member of the squad.

He made his full international debut in a friendly against Hungary on 11 August 2010, coming on as a half time substitute and was involved in a controversy over Hungary's goal. After making a mistake in the build-up, he got back to clear the ball off the line – a goal was given, however replays suggested the ball had actually not crossed the line.

On 3 September 2010, Dawson made his first competitive start for England in the UEFA Euro 2012 qualifying match against Bulgaria. He sustained a knee injury and left the field on a stretcher after 56 minutes.

== Career statistics ==
=== Club ===
Appearances and goals by club, season and competition
Club	Season	League			FA Cup		League Cup		Europe		Other		Total	
Club	Season	Division	Apps	Goals	Apps	Goals	Apps	Goals	Apps	Goals	Apps	Goals	Apps	Goals
Nottingham Forest	2001–02	First Division	1	0	0	0	0	0	—		—		1	0
Nottingham Forest	2002–03	First Division	38	5	1	0	2	0	—		1 (Note: Appearance in First Division play-offs)	0	42	5
Nottingham Forest	2003–04	First Division	30	1	0	0	1	0	—		—		31	1
Nottingham Forest	2004–05	Championship	14	1	1	0	2	0	—		—		17	1
Nottingham Forest	Total		83	7	2	0	5	0	—		1	0	91	7
Tottenham Hotspur	2004–05	Premier League	5	0	—		—		—		—		5	0
Tottenham Hotspur	2005–06	Premier League	32	0	1	0	0	0	—		—		33	0
Tottenham Hotspur	2006–07	Premier League	37	1	6	0	5	0	10 (Note: Appearances in UEFA Cup)	0	—		58	1
Tottenham Hotspur	2007–08	Premier League	27	1	3	0	4	0	6	1	—		40	2
Tottenham Hotspur	2008–09	Premier League	16	1	2	0	5	1	5	0	—		28	2
Tottenham Hotspur	2009–10	Premier League	29	2	8	0	3	0	—		—		40	2
Tottenham Hotspur	2010–11	Premier League	24	1	2	0	0	0	6 (Note: Appearances in UEFA Champions League)	0	—		32	1
Tottenham Hotspur	2011–12	Premier League	7	0	4	0	0	0	2 (Note: Appearances in UEFA Europa League)	0	—		13	0
Tottenham Hotspur	2012–13	Premier League	27	1	1	0	2	0	4	1	—		34	2
Tottenham Hotspur	2013–14	Premier League	32	0	1	0	1	0	7	0	—		41	0
Tottenham Hotspur	2014–15	Premier League	0	0	—		—		0	0	—		0	0
Tottenham Hotspur	Total		236	7	28	0	20	1	40	2	—		324	10
Hull City	2014–15	Premier League	28	1	0	0	0	0	—		—		28	1
Hull City	2015–16	Championship	32	1	1	0	1	0	—		3 (Note: Appearance in Championship play-offs)	0	36	1
Hull City	2016–17	Premier League	22	3	1	0	3	1	—		—		26	4
Hull City	2017–18	Championship	40	3	1	0	0	0	—		—		41	3
Hull City	Total		122	8	3	0	4	1	—		3	0	132	9
Nottingham Forest	2018–19	Championship	10	0	0	0	3	0	—		—		13	0
Nottingham Forest	2019–20	Championship	18	1	1	0	0	0	—		—		19	1
Nottingham Forest	Total		28	1	1	0	3	0	—		—		32	1
Career total			469	23	34	0	32	2	40	2	4	0	579	27

=== International ===
Appearances and goals by national team and year
National team	Year	Apps	Goals
England	2010	2	0
England	2011	2	0
Total		4	0

== Honours ==
Tottenham Hotspur

- Football League Cup: 2007–08; runner-up: 2008–09

Hull City

- Football League Championship play-offs: 2016

Individual

- PFA Team of the Year: 2002–03 First Division, 2015–16 Championship
- Tottenham Hotspur Player of the Year: 2009–10
- Hull City Player of the Year: 2014–15
