= 2016 Football League Championship play-off final =

Association football match in London

- The match was played at Wembley Stadium.
- Event: 2015–16 Football League Championship
Hull City	Sheffield Wednesday
1	0
- Date: 28 May 2016
- Venue: Wembley Stadium, London
- Man of the Match: Mohamed Diamé (Hull City)
- Referee: Bobby Madley
- Attendance: 70,189
- Weather: Sunny

The 2016 Football League Championship play-off final was an association football match which was played on 28 May 2016 at Wembley Stadium, London, between Sheffield Wednesday and Hull City. The match was to determine the third and final team to gain promotion from the Football League Championship, the second tier of English football, to the Premier League. The top two teams of the 2015–16 Football League Championship season gained automatic promotion to the Premier League, while the teams placed from third to sixth place in the table partook in play-off semi-finals; Hull City ended the season in fourth position while Sheffield Wednesday finished sixth. The winners of these semi-finals competed for the final place for the 2016–17 season in the Premier League. Winning the game was estimated to be worth up to £200 million to the successful team.

The 2016 final, refereed by Bobby Madley, was watched by a crowd of more than 70,000 people in sunny conditions. Hull City won 1–0, the only goal of the game being scored by the man of the match Mohamed Diamé in the 72nd minute. It was Hull's first game at Wembley since losing the 2014 FA Cup Final and marked their return to the Premier League for the first time since their relegation in the 2014–15 season.

Hull were relegated back to the Championship the following season, as they finished 18th in the 2016–17 Premier League. Sheffield Wednesday finished the following season in fourth place but were knocked out in the play-offs by Huddersfield Town on penalties.

== Route to the final ==
Football League Championship final table, leading positions
Pos	Team	Pld	W	D	L	GF	GA	GD	Pts
1	Burnley	46	26	15	5	72	35	+37	93
2	Middlesbrough	46	26	11	9	63	31	+32	89
3	Brighton & Hove Albion	46	24	17	5	72	42	+30	89
4	Hull City	46	24	11	11	69	35	+34	83
5	Derby County	46	21	15	10	66	43	+23	78
6	Sheffield Wednesday	46	19	17	10	66	45	+21	74

Hull City finished the regular 2015–16 season in fourth place in the Football League Championship, the second tier of the English football league system, two places ahead of Sheffield Wednesday. Both therefore missed out on the two automatic places for promotion to the Premier League and instead took part in the play-offs to determine the third promoted team. Hull finished six points behind Middlesbrough (who were promoted in second place) and ten behind league winners Burnley. Sheffield Wednesday ended the season nine points behind Hull.

Sheffield Wednesday faced Brighton & Hove Albion in their play-off semi-final and the first leg was played at Hillsborough. A goal from Wednesday's Fernando Forestieri was ruled out for offside before Wednesday's Ross Wallace scored from 25 yards just before half time. Connor Goldson and Tomer Hemed were both substituted for Brighton through injury in the first half, and with Steve Sidwell and Anthony Knockaert leaving the field in the second half, the visitors were forced to play the final 30 minutes with ten men. Kieran Lee doubled Wednesday's advantage in the 73rd minute and the tie ended 2–0. Brighton's Lewis Dunk, back from suspension, scored the opening goal in the second leg, at Falmer Stadium. Less than ten minutes later, Wallace's cross drifted into the goal to equalise the tie. Brighton barely threatened Wednesday in the second half and the semi-final ended 3–1 on aggregate; the south coast club lost their third play-off semi-final in four years.

Hull City's semi-final was against Derby County and the first leg was held at Pride Park Stadium. Abel Hernández put the visitors into the lead with a 25-yard shot on the half-hour mark, before an own goal from Jason Shackell doubled Hull's lead before the break. Derby's first shot on target, a weak effort from Jacob Butterfield, came in the 80th minute. Andrew Robertson scored late in stoppage time to end the match 3–0. The second leg was played at the KCOM Stadium and Derby took an early lead with a Johnny Russell goal in the 7th minute. An own goal from Robertson ten minutes before the break made the score 2–0 to Derby while a save from Hull's goalkeeper Eldin Jakupović denied Chris Martin and Derby an equaliser. Despite having almost two-thirds of the possession and 16 shots, Derby were unable to restore parity as the semi-final ended 3–2 on aggregate to Hull.

Hull City			Round	Sheffield Wednesday
Opponent	Result	Legs	Semi-finals	Opponent	Result	Legs
Derby County	3–2	3–0 away; 0–2 home		Brighton & Hove Albion	3–1	2–0 home; 1–1 away

== Match ==
=== Background ===
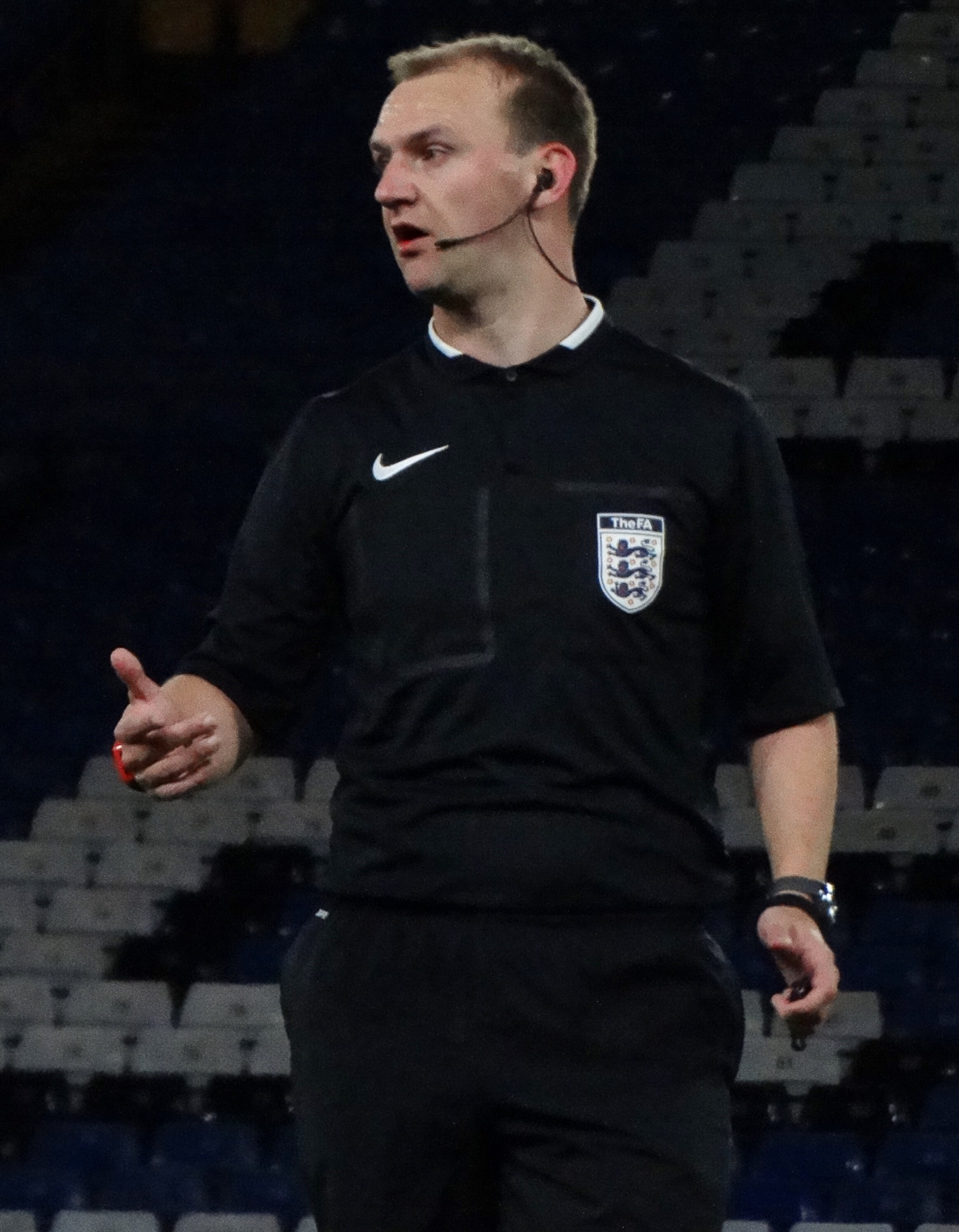
Bobby Madley was the referee for the final.

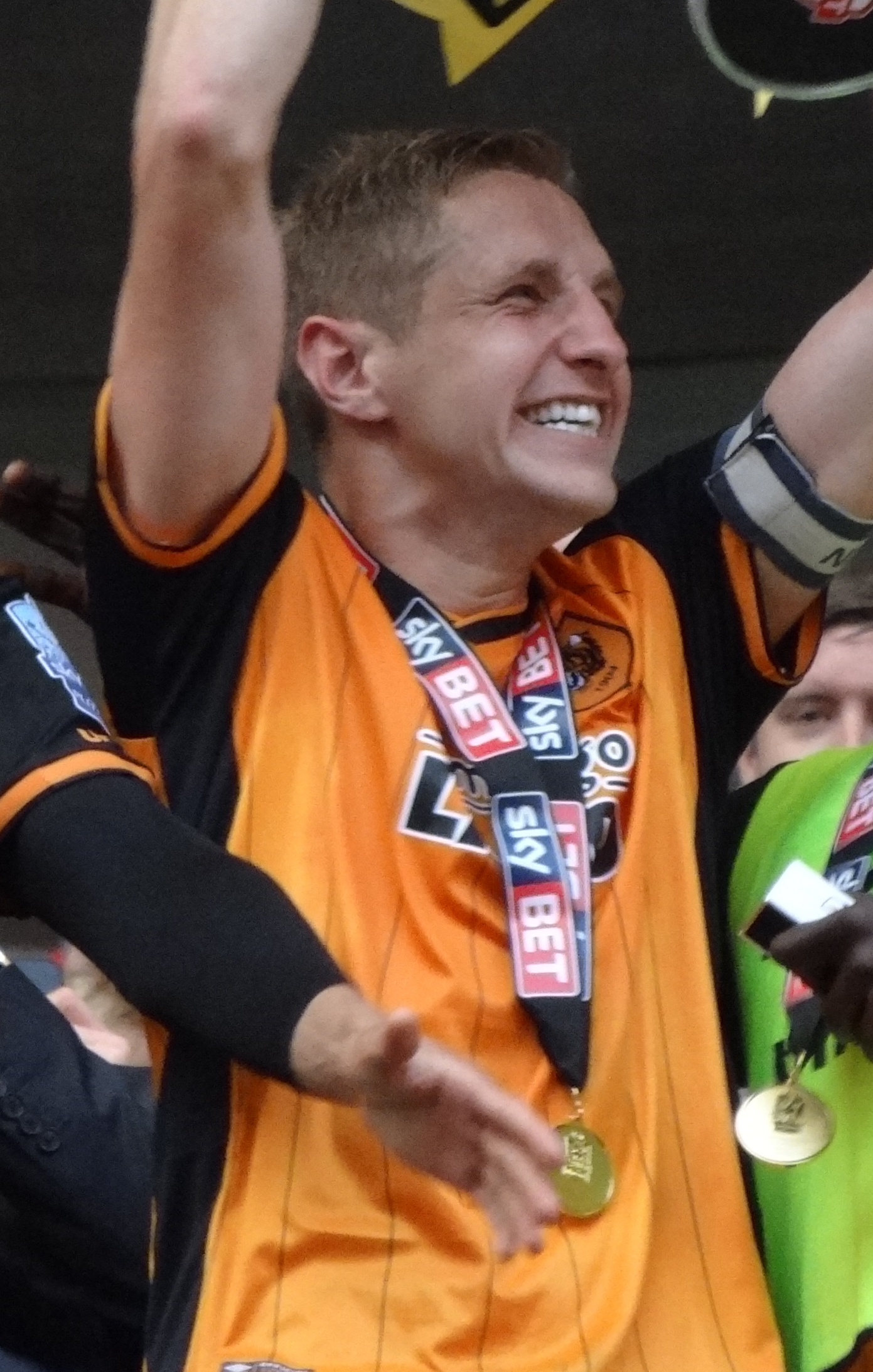
Hull City's captain Michael Dawson lifting the play-off final trophy

This was Hull's second play-off final, having defeated Bristol City 1–0 in the 2008 final. They had also played at Wembley in the 2014 FA Cup Final where they lost 3–2 to Arsenal in extra time. Hull had been relegated from the Premier League in the 2014–15 season and were aiming to return to the top tier of English football at the first attempt. Sheffield Wednesday had experienced play-off final success at the Millennium Stadium when they defeated Hartlepool United to win the 2005 Football League One play-off final, but had not featured in any play-off finals for promotion to the top tier of English football. During the regular season, the clubs had drawn in both meetings, 1–1 at Hillsborough in October 2015 and 0–0 at the KCOM Stadium the following February. Forestieri was Sheffield Wednesday's top scorer with 15 league goals, while Hernández was joint second top scorer in the division with 21.

Hull City's starting eleven was unchanged from the second semi-final leg defeat to Derby County. Sheffield Wednesday manager Carlos Carvalhal made one change, bringing in Sam Hutchinson to replace Álex López in midfield. The final was refereed by Bobby Madley, with assistant referees Simon Bennett and Peter Kirkup, while Phil Gibbs acted as the fourth official. It was reported in the media and press that the game was worth between £110 million and £200 million over three years to the winners through sponsorship and television deals. Hull were considered favourites by bookmakers to win the match which was broadcast in the UK on Sky Sports 1.

Hull City were allocated 38,956 tickets for the final, but failed to sell them all due to supporter segregation and an ongoing boycott against the Allam family ownership from many fans. Sheffield Wednesday sold out their full allocation of 38,889 tickets.

=== First half ===
Hull kicked the match off at around 5 p.m. in sunny conditions in front of a crowd of 70,189. The first shot on goal came in the 4th minute from Hull's Tom Huddlestone whose strike was saved by the Sheffield Wednesday goalkeeper Keiren Westwood. After an even ten minutes, Michael Dawson drew the first booking of the match. After a late challenge on Forestieri, the Wednesday striker took the free kick himself, Jakupović punched it over the bar, which the former Leicester City player Steve Claridge described as "awful, dreadful". Another free kick to Wednesday in the 15th minute was also punched clear. In the 29th minute, Westwood conceded a corner to Hull and from the set piece, Hernández's header was cleared off the line by Wednesday's Lee. A Forestieri shot two minutes later went wide before Hernández went through on goal, one-on-one with Westwood, who made an excellent save to deny the opening goal. Hull's challenge continued with a shot off target from Moses Odubajo in the 35th minute. With five minutes of the half remaining, Hull's Mohamed Diamé beat three defenders but his shot from seven yards ricocheted off the post. In the last moment of the half, Hull had two chances: Westwood saved a low Odubajo effort while Hernández's overhead kick which was blocked, and the half ended 0–0.

=== Second half ===
Neither team made any changes at half-time, and the second half was kicked off by Sheffield Wednesday. In the 51st minute, Forestieri was denied a shooting opportunity by Hull's Curtis Davies. A 54th minute close-range shot from Dawson was saved by Westwood. Four minutes later, Hull made a quick break only for Robertson to head the ball over the bar from an accurate Odubajo pass. Wednesday's Hutchinson then shot from distance but his strike also went over the bar. Forestieri's 62nd minute shot was deflected for a corner which was subsequently cleared by the Hull goalkeeper Jakupović. A minute later Sheffield Wednesday made the first substitution of the game with Jérémy Hélan coming on for Wallace. In the 72nd minute, the deadlock was broken – Hull's Diamé struck the ball from outside the Wednesday penalty area, past Westwood, to take a 1–0 lead. Claridge remarked that it was a "wonderful, brilliant, fantastic strike". Wednesday made their second substitution immediately afterwards, as Atdhe Nuhiu replaced Hutchinson. In the 79th minute, Odubajo shot wide, and with eight minutes of normal time remaining, Hull made their first substitution, bringing off the Scottish winger Robert Snodgrass and replacing him with the midfielder Sam Clucas. A minute later Hernández's shot was blocked by Glenn Loovens, conceding a corner, which Davies headed waywardly. A chance for Sheffield Wednesday was missed after Forestieri's pass failed to find a teammate, and Hull's striker Hernández was then replaced by the Irish midfielder David Meyler. A foul from Wednesday's defender Daniel Pudil was his last contribution to the match as he was substituted in the 87th minute for the Portuguese striker Lucas João. With a minute of regular time remaining, Hull made their final change with the goalscorer Diamé substituted for Harry Maguire. Four minutes of additional time were indicated by the fourth official, and despite a chance for João to equalise, the match ended 1–0, ensuring Hull's return to the Premier League.

=== Details ===
28 May 2016
17:00 (BST)

Hull City	1–0	Sheffield Wednesday
Diamé 72'	Report

Wembley Stadium, London
Attendance: 70,189
Referee: Bobby Madley

Hull City	Sheffield Wednesday

GK	16	(Switzerland) Eldin Jakupović
RB	27	(Egypt) Ahmed Elmohamady
CB	21	(England) Michael Dawson (c)	(yellow card) 10'
CB	6	(England) Curtis Davies
LB	26	(Scotland) Andy Robertson
CM	14	(England) Jake Livermore
CM	8	(England) Tom Huddlestone
RM	2	(England) Moses Odubajo
AM	17	(Senegal) Mohamed Diamé		(substituted off) 89'
LM	10	(Scotland) Robert Snodgrass		(substituted off) 82'
CF	9	(Uruguay) Abel Hernández		(substituted off) 85'
Substitutes:
GK	30	(Slovakia) Dušan Kuciak
DF	4	(Northern Ireland) Alex Bruce
DF	12	(England) Harry Maguire		(substituted on) 89'
MF	7	(Republic of Ireland) David Meyler		(substituted on) 85'
MF	11	(England) Sam Clucas		(substituted on) 82'
MF	15	(Scotland) Shaun Maloney
FW	19	(England) Chuba Akpom
Manager:
(England) Steve Bruce

GK	1	(Republic of Ireland) Keiren Westwood
RB	32	(England) Jack Hunt
CB	15	(England) Tom Lees
CB	5	(Netherlands) Glenn Loovens (c)
LB	36	(Czech Republic) Daniel Pudil	(substituted off) 86'
DM	4	(England) Sam Hutchinson	(substituted off) 76'
CM	20	(England) Kieran Lee
CM	41	(Scotland) Barry Bannan
RW	33	(Scotland) Ross Wallace	(substituted off) 63'
CF	45	(Italy) Fernando Forestieri
LW	14	(England) Gary Hooper
Substitutes:
GK	28	(England) Joe Wildsmith
DF	23	(France) Vincent Sasso
MF	7	(Portugal) Marco Matias
MF	17	(France) Jérémy Hélan	(substituted on) 63'
MF	21	(Spain) Álex López
FW	9	(Kosovo) Atdhe Nuhiu	(substituted on) 76'
FW	18	(Portugal) Lucas João	(substituted on) 86'
Head Coach:
(Portugal) Carlos Carvalhal

Match rules:
- 90 minutes.
- 30 minutes of extra time if necessary.
- Penalty shoot-out if scores still level.
- Seven named substitutes.
- Maximum of three substitutions.

=== Statistics ===
Statistic	Hull City	Sheffield Wednesday
Total shots	10	9
Shots on target	4	3
Ball possession	47%	53%
Corner kicks	4	5
Fouls committed	10	10
Offsides	1	0
Yellow cards	1	0
Red cards	0	0

== Post-match ==
The Hull manager Steve Bruce remarked: "The goal was a wonder goal that would have graced any cup final ... Overall, I think we've deserved to win from the chances we've created." Carvalhal was gracious in defeat, noting: "I think Hull deserved to win the game, they were better than us ... we didn't create too many problems defensively for Hull." Former Celtic manager Neil Lennon, reporting for BBC Radio 5 Live, stated: "it's the right result, there was a definite gulf in class between the two teams on the day ... credit to Hull – they played the game brilliantly and deserved the win". Hull's Diamé was named man of the match.

Hull ended the next season in 18th position in the 2016–17 Premier League, and were relegated back to the Championship. Sheffield Wednesday finished the following season in fourth place and qualified for the play-offs where they were eliminated in the semi-finals by Huddersfield Town on penalties.

== See also ==
- 2016 Football League One play-off final
- 2016 Football League Two play-off final
