= 2019–20 Swansea City A.F.C. season =

Swansea City
2019–20 season
- Chairman: Trevor Birch
- Head coach: Steve Cooper
- Stadium: Liberty Stadium
- Championship: 6th
- FA Cup: Third round
- EFL Cup: Third round
- Top goalscorer: League: André Ayew (15); All: André Ayew (18)
- Highest home attendance: 20,270 vs. Cardiff City (27 October 2019, Championship)
- Lowest home attendance: 8,058 vs. Northampton Town (13 August 2019, EFL Cup)
- Average home league attendance: 16,261
Home colours	Away colours	Third colours

The 2019–20 season was Swansea City's 100th season in the English football league system, and their second season back in the Championship since 2010–11 following relegation from the Premier League in the 2017–18 season. Along with competing in the Championship, the club competed in the FA Cup and EFL Cup losing in the third round of each respectively.

The season covered the period from 1 July 2019 to 30 June 2020 but was extraordinarily extended to 30 July 2020 because of the COVID-19 pandemic.

== Club ==
=== First-team staff ===
As of 16 September 2019

Position	Name
Head coach	(Wales) Steve Cooper
Assistant first-team coaches	(England) Mike Marsh
Assistant first-team coaches	(England) Alan Tate
First-team fitness coach	(England) David Tivey
Goalkeeping coach	(Wales) Martyn Margetson
Head of performance analysis	(England) Steve Rands
Head of recruitment	(England) Andy Scott

=== First-team squad ===
As of 1 February 2020

Note: Flags indicate national team as defined under FIFA eligibility rules; some limited exceptions apply. Players may hold more than one non-FIFA nationality.

No.	Pos.	Nation	Player
2	DF	ENG	Marc Guehi (on loan from Chelsea)
4	DF	WAL	Joe Rodon
5	DF	NED	Mike van der Hoorn
6	MF	SCO	Jay Fulton
8	MF	ENG	Matt Grimes (captain)
10	MF	KOS	Bersant Celina
12	MF	ENG	Nathan Dyer
14	MF	ENG	Tom Carroll
15	MF	ENG	Wayne Routledge
18	FW	FRA	Aldo Kalulu (on loan from Basel)
19	FW	ENG	Rhian Brewster (on loan from Liverpool)
20	DF	ENG	Ben Wilmot (on loan from Watford)

No.	Pos.	Nation	Player
21	MF	ENG	Yan Dhanda
22	FW	GHA	André Ayew
23	DF	WAL	Connor Roberts
24	DF	ENG	Jake Bidwell
25	GK	NED	Erwin Mulder
26	DF	ENG	Kyle Naughton
27	GK	ENG	Freddie Woodman (on loan from Newcastle United)
28	MF	SCO	George Byers
32	FW	WAL	Liam Cullen
33	MF	ENG	Conor Gallagher (on loan from Chelsea)
41	FW	JAM	Jordon Garrick
44	DF	WAL	Ben Cabango

== Transfers ==
=== Transfers in ===
Date	Position	Nationality	Name	From	Fee	Ref.
25 June 2019	GK	(Wales)	Lewis Webb	Merthyr Town	Undisclosed	
2 July 2019	LB	(England)	Jake Bidwell	Queens Park Rangers	Free transfer	
2 August 2019	LW	(Sweden)	Kristoffer Peterson	Heracles Almelo	Undisclosed	
29 January 2020	LW	(England)	Rio Campbell	Free Agent	Free	

=== Transfers out ===
Date	Position	Nationality	Name	To	Fee	Ref.
1 July 2019	DM	(Scotland)	Ryan Blair	Free agent	Released	
1 July 2019	CF	(Ivory Coast)	Wilfried Bony	Free agent	Released	
1 July 2019	CB	(Wales)	Keston Davies	Released (Note: Joined The New Saints on 1 July 2019.)		
1 July 2019	MF	(Wales)	Owen Evans	Free agent	Released	
1 July 2019	CM	(Netherlands)	Leroy Fer	Released (Note: Joined Feyenoord on 25 July 2019.)		
1 July 2019	LW	(Wales)	Daniel James	Manchester United	Undisclosed	
1 July 2019	CM	(Scotland)	Adam King	Released (Note: Joined Dundee United on 11 July 2019.)		
1 July 2019	RB	(Wales)	Aaron Lewis	Released (Note: Joined Lincoln City on 10 August 2019.)		
1 July 2019	DM	(Sweden)	Adnan Marić	Free agent	Released	
1 July 2019	RW	(Netherlands)	Luciano Narsingh	Released (Note: Joined Feyenoord on 5 July 2019.)		
1 July 2019	LB	(Sweden)	Martin Olsson	Free agent	Released	
1 July 2019	GK	(Wales)	Scott Reed	Free agent	Released	
1 July 2019	MF	(England)	Jayden Reid	Released (Note: Joined Birmingham City on 5 July 2019.)		
1 July 2019	RB	(England)	Tyler Reid	Released (Note: Joined Swindon Town on 3 June 2019.)		
1 July 2019	GK	(England)	Nathan Shepperd	Released (Note: Joined Brentford on 21 June 2019.)		
1 July 2019	CB	(Wales)	Jack Withers	Free agent	Released	
1 July 2019	CF	(Wales)	Shaquille Wynter-Coles	Free agent	Released	
5 July 2019	ST	(Scotland)	Botti Biabi	Free Agent	Released	
5 July 2019	MF	(Romania)	Marco Dulca	Viitorul Constanța	Free transfer	
25 July 2019	ST	(Ghana)	Jordan Ayew	Crystal Palace	£2.5 million	
2 August 2019	CF	(Scotland)	Oli McBurnie	Sheffield United	Undisclosed	
14 January 2020	GK	(Sweden)	Kristoffer Nordfeldt	Gençlerbirliği	Free transfer	
30 January 2020	CM	(Belgium)	Simon Paulet	KVC Westerlo	Free transfer	
31 January 2020	CB	(Wales)	Cian Harries	Bristol Rovers	Free transfer	
31 January 2020	CF	(Spain)	Borja Bastón	Aston Villa	Free transfer	
31 January 2020	CM	(England)	Tom Carroll	Free agent	Released	
3 February 2020	GK	(Slovenia)	Gregor Zabret	Free agent	Released	

=== Loans in ===
Start date	Position	Nationality	Name	From	Expiry date	Ref.
25 July 2019	CB	(England)	Ben Wilmot	Watford	30 June 2020	
1 August 2019	GK	(England)	Freddie Woodman	Newcastle United	30 June 2020	
5 August 2019	RW	(France)	Aldo Kalulu	FC Basel	30 June 2020	
6 August 2019	CF	(England)	Sam Surridge	AFC Bournemouth	1 January 2020	
7 January 2020	CF	(England)	Rhian Brewster	Liverpool	30 June 2020	
10 January 2020	CB	(England)	Marc Guehi	Chelsea	30 June 2020	
15 January 2020	CM	(England)	Conor Gallagher	Chelsea	30 June 2020	

=== Loans out ===
Start date	Position	Nationality	Name	To	Expiry date	Ref.
5 July 2019	GK	(Slovenia)	Gregor Zabret	Oldham Athletic	30 June 2020	
30 July 2019	CB	(Wales)	Joe Lewis	Torquay United	30 June 2020	
9 August 2019	WG	(Ecuador)	Jefferson Montero	Birmingham City	30 June 2020	
9 August 2019	ST	(England)	Courtney Baker-Richardson	Accrington Stanley	30 June 2020	
15 August 2019	ST	(Sweden)	Joel Asoro	Groningen	30 June 2020	
27 August 2019	CB	(Wales)	Cian Harries	Fortuna Sittard	30 June 2020	
2 September 2019	GK	(Germany)	Steven Benda	Swindon Town	30 June 2020	
3 September 2019	DM	(Wales)	Tom Price	Aberystwyth Town	1 January 2020	
20 January 2020	LW	(Sweden)	Kristoffer Peterson	FC Utrecht	30 June 2020	
30 January 2020	CM	(Wales)	Cameron Berry	Carmarthen Town	30 June 2020	
31 January 2020	CM	(Wales)	Jack Evans	Mansfield Town	30 June 2020	
31 January 2020	LB	(Wales)	Declan John	Sunderland	30 June 2020	
31 January 2020	LW	(Scotland)	Barrie McKay	Fleetwood Town	30 June 2020	
7 February 2020	CB	(Wales)	Brandon Cooper	Yeovil Town	30 June 2020	

=== New contracts ===
Date signed	Position	Nationality	Name	Contract length	Expiry date	Ref.
23 May 2019	MF	(England)	Wayne Routledge	1 Year	30 June 2020	
21 June 2019	GK	(Germany)	Steven Benda	3 Years	30 June 2022	
25 June 2019	GK	(Wales)	Josh Gould	1 Year	30 June 2020	
28 June 2019	DF	(Wales)	Matt Blake	2 Years	30 June 2021	
29 June 2019	MF	(Wales)	Tom Price	1 Year	30 June 2020	
1 July 2019	DF	(Wales)	Cameron Evans	1 Year	30 June 2020	
9 July 2019	MF	(Scotland)	George Byers	3 Years	30 June 2022	
23 December 2019	MF	(England)	Yan Dhanda	2.5 Years	30 June 2022	
28 December 2019	DF	(Wales)	Brandon Cooper	1.5 Years	30 June 2021	
10 January 2020	GK	(England)	Josh Gould	2.5 Years	30 June 2022	
11 January 2020	DF	(Wales) (Zimbabwe)	Tivonge Rushesha	2.5 Years	30 June 2022	
19 January 2020	MF	(Wales)	Jack Evans	1.5 Years	30 June 2021	
29 January 2020	FW	(Wales)	Liam Cullen	2.5 Years	30 June 2022	

== Pre-season ==
The Swans announced pre-season fixtures against Mansfield Town, Crawley Town, Yeovil Town, Exeter City, Bristol Rovers and Atalanta.

6 July 2019 Friendly	Mansfield Town	1–2	Swansea City	Vila Real de Santo António, Portugal
12:00 WEST	Maynard 35'	Report	Routledge 45+3'; McKay 90'	Stadium: Complexo Desportivo

13 July 2019 Friendly	Crawley Town	2–3	Swansea City	Crawley
15:00 BST	McNerney 52'; Morais 76'	Report	Dyer 15'; Byers 25'; McBurnie 47'	Stadium: The People's Pension Stadium; Attendance: 2,165

16 July 2019 Friendly	Yeovil Town	1–6	Swansea City	Yeovil
19:45 BST	Dickinson 33'	Report	Celina 4'; Fulton 9', 43', 54'; McKay 75'; Baker-Richardson 90+2'	Stadium: Huish Park; Attendance: 1,349

20 July 2019 Friendly	Exeter City	1–3	Swansea City	Exeter
15:00 BST	Law 56' (pen.)	Report	Celina 11', 21'; Dyer 49'	Stadium: St James Park; Attendance: 2,486

23 July 2019 Friendly	Bristol Rovers	0–3	Swansea City	Horfield
19:45 BST		Report	Fulton 12'; Bastón 83'; Asoro 90'	Stadium: Memorial Stadium; Attendance: 2,076

27 July 2019 Friendly	Swansea City	2–1	Atalanta	Swansea
15:00 BST	Hateboer 62' (o.g.); Roberts 67'	Report	Iličić 5'	Stadium: Liberty Stadium

== Competitions ==
=== Overview ===
Competition	Record							
Competition	G	W	D	L	GF	GA	GD	Win %
Championship	46	18	16	12	62	53	+9	39.13
FA Cup	1	0	0	1	1	5	−4	0.00
EFL Cup	3	2	0	1	10	3	+7	66.67
Total	50	20	16	14	73	61	+12	40.00

Updated to match played 22 July 2020
Source: Competitions

=== League table ===
Pos	Team	Pld	W	D	L	GF	GA	GD	Pts	Promotion, qualification or relegation
3	Brentford	46	24	9	13	80	38	+42	81	Qualification for Championship play-offs (Note: Four teams play for one spot and promotion to the Premier League.)
4	Fulham (O, P)	46	23	12	11	64	48	+16	81	Qualification for Championship play-offs
5	Cardiff City	46	19	16	11	68	58	+10	73	Qualification for Championship play-offs
6	Swansea City	46	18	16	12	62	53	+9	70	Qualification for Championship play-offs
7	Nottingham Forest	46	18	16	12	58	50	+8	70	
8	Millwall	46	17	17	12	57	51	+6	68	
9	Preston North End	46	18	12	16	59	54	+5	66	

Source: EFL Official Website
Rules for classification: 1) Points; 2) Goal difference; 3) Number of goals scored; 4) Head-to-head results; 5) Wins; 6) Away goals; 7) Penalty points (sec 9.5); 8) 12-point sending off offences
(O) Play-off winners; (P) Promoted

==== Results summary ====
Overall								Home						Away					
Pld	W	D	L	GF	GA	GD	Pts	W	D	L	GF	GA	GD	W	D	L	GF	GA	GD
46	18	16	12	62	53	+9	70	10	5	8	27	23	+4	8	11	4	35	30	+5

Last updated: 22 July 2020.
Source: 11v11 for league tables

==== Results by matchday ====
Matchday	1	2	3	4	5	6	7	8	9	10	11	12	13	14	15	16	17	18	19	20	21	22	23	24	25	26	27	28	29	30	31	32	33	34	35	36	37	38	39	40	41	42	43	44	45	46
Ground	H	A	H	A	H	A	H	A	H	A	H	A	H	H	A	A	H	A	H	A	H	H	A	A	H	H	A	H	A	A	H	H	A	H	A	A	H	A	H	A	H	A	H	A	H	A
Result	W	D	W	W	W	W	L	D	D	W	L	D	L	W	W	D	L	D	L	L	D	W	W	L	D	W	D	W	L	D	L	D	D	W	L	D	D	W	L	D	W	W	L	D	W	W
Position	7	7	4	2	2	1	2	2	2	1	4	3	9	4	3	4	6	5	6	11	11	10	7	8	9	6	7	5	7	8	9	9	9	9	9	9	11	10	10	10	8	7	7	8	7	6

Updated to match(es) played on 22 July 2020. Source: BBC
A = Away; H = Home; W = Win; D = Draw; L = Loss

==== Matches ====
Win Draw Loss

On Thursday, 20 June 2019, the EFL Championship fixtures were revealed.

3 August 2019 1	Swansea City	2–1	Hull City	Swansea
15:00 BST	Bastón 47' van der Hoorn 49'	Report	Batty 3'	Stadium: Liberty Stadium; Attendance: 15,741; Referee: John Brooks

10 August 2019 2	Derby County	0–0	Swansea City	Derby
15:00 BST		Report		Stadium: Pride Park Stadium; Attendance: 27,337; Referee: Jarred Gillett

17 August 2019 3	Swansea City	3–2	Preston North End	Swansea
15:00 BST	Bastón 45+4', 69'; Byers 63'	Report	Rafferty 11'; Johnson 67' (pen.)	Stadium: Liberty Stadium; Attendance: 15,250; Referee: Dean Whitestone

21 August 2019 4	Queens Park Rangers	1–3	Swansea City	Shepherd's Bush
19:45 BST	Hugill 66'	Report	Celina 29'; Bastón 70' (pen.); Surridge 80'	Stadium: Loftus Road; Attendance: 12,287; Referee: Paul Tierney

25 August 2019 5	Swansea City	3–0	Birmingham City	Swansea
12:00 BST	Naughton 63'; Celina 68'; Bastón 75' (pen.)	Report		Stadium: Liberty Stadium; Attendance: 17,277; Referee: Andy Woolmer
Note: Live on Sky Sports

31 August 2019 6	Leeds United	0–1	Swansea City	Leeds
15:00 BST		Report	Routledge 90'	Stadium: Elland Road; Attendance: 34,935; Referee: Darren Bond

14 September 2019 7	Swansea City	0–1	Nottingham Forest	Swansea
15:00 BST		Report	Semedo 85'	Stadium: Liberty Stadium; Attendance: 17,102; Referee: James Linington

21 September 2019 8	Bristol City	0–0	Swansea City	Ashton Gate
15:00 BST		Report		Stadium: Ashton Gate Stadium; Attendance: 22,885; Referee: Tony Harrington

28 September 2019 9	Swansea City	1–1	Reading	Swansea
15:00 BST	Bastón 3'	Report	Yiadom 90'	Stadium: Liberty Stadium; Attendance: 16,036; Referee: Keith Stroud

2 October 2019 10	Charlton Athletic	1–2	Swansea City	Charlton
19:45 BST	Leko 2'	Report	Dhanda 17'; Ayew 65'	Stadium: The Valley; Attendance: 15,741; Referee: Peter Bankes

5 October 2019 11	Swansea City	1–2	Stoke City	Swansea
15:00 BST	Ayew 1'	Report	Clucas 22'; Hogan 90'	Stadium: Liberty Stadium; Attendance: 16,612; Referee: Oliver Langford

19 October 2019 12	Barnsley	1–1	Swansea City	Barnsley
15:00 BST	Mowatt 70'	Report	Ayew 67'	Stadium: Oakwell; Attendance: 12,424; Referee: Andy Woolmer

22 October 2019 13	Swansea City	0–3	Brentford	Swansea
19:45 BST		Report	Benrahma 30'; Bidwell 36' (o.g.); Mbeumo 56'	Stadium: Liberty Stadium; Attendance: 15,875; Referee: Gavin Ward

27 October 2019 14	Swansea City	1–0	Cardiff City	Swansea
12:00 GMT	Wilmot 24'	Report		Stadium: Liberty Stadium; Attendance: 20,270; Referee: Robert Jones

2 November 2019 15	Wigan Athletic	1–2	Swansea City	Wigan
12:30 GMT	Moore 21' (pen.)	Report	Dyer 12'; Surridge 92'	Stadium: DW Stadium; Attendance: 9,080; Referee: Peter Bankes

9 November 2019 16	Sheffield Wednesday	2–2	Swansea City	Owlerton
15:00 GMT	Forestieri 81'; Fox 90+1'	Report	Ayew 32'; Wilmot 90+4'	Stadium: Hillsborough; Attendance: 23,073; Referee: David Webb

23 November 2019 17	Swansea City	0–1	Millwall	Swansea
15:00 GMT		Report	J. Wallace 65'	Stadium: Liberty Stadium; Attendance: 16,840; Referee: Andy Davies

26 November 2019 18	Huddersfield Town	1–1	Swansea City	Huddersfield
19:45 GMT	Grant 41'; Chalobah (red card) 86'	Report	Fulton 18'	Stadium: John Smith's Stadium; Attendance: 20,062; Referee: Jarred Gillett

29 November 2019 19	Swansea City	1–2	Fulham	Swansea
19:45 GMT	Byers 65'	Report	Mitrović 22', 43'	Stadium: Liberty Stadium; Attendance: 16,024; Referee: Simon Hooper

8 December 2019 20	West Bromwich Albion	5–1	Swansea City	West Bromwich
12:00 GMT	Ajayi 25'; Pereira 34'; Robson-Kanu 44'; Phillips 70'; Edwards 74'	Report	Surridge 39'	Stadium: The Hawthorns; Attendance: 22,927; Referee: Keith Stroud

11 December 2019 21	Swansea City	1–1	Blackburn Rovers	Swansea
19:45 GMT	Ayew 10'; Carroll (yellow card) 32' (yellow-red card) 57'	Report	Graham 4'; Dack (yellow card) 8' (yellow-red card) 67'	Stadium: Liberty Stadium; Referee: Jeremy Simpson

14 December 2019 22	Swansea City	3–1	Middlesbrough	Swansea
15:00 GMT	Ayew 22' (pen.), 71' Surridge 73'	Report	Browne (yellow card) 52' (yellow-red card) 63'; Tavernier 59'; McNair (red card) 77'	Stadium: Liberty Stadium; Attendance: 14,625; Referee: Dean Whitestone

21 December 2019 23	Luton Town	0–1	Swansea City	Luton
15:00 GMT		Report	Ayew 82'	Stadium: Kenilworth Road; Attendance: 10,062; Referee: David Webb

26 December 2019 24	Brentford	3–1	Swansea City	Brentford
15:00 GMT	Mbeumo 20'; Watkins 25', 88'	Report	Ayew 65'	Stadium: Griffin Park; Attendance: 11,848; Referee: Andy Woolmer

29 December 2019 25	Swansea City	0–0	Barnsley	Swansea
15:00 GMT		Report		Stadium: Liberty Stadium; Attendance: 17,097; Referee: Antony Coggins

2 January 2020 26	Swansea City	1–0	Charlton Athletic	Swansea
19:45 GMT	Dhanda 14'	Report		Stadium: Liberty Stadium; Attendance: 15,352; Referee: Peter Bankes

12 January 2020 27	Cardiff City	0–0	Swansea City	Cardiff
12:00 GMT		Report		Stadium: Cardiff City Stadium; Referee: Tony Harrington

18 January 2020 28	Swansea City	2–1	Wigan Athletic	Swansea
15:00 GMT	Brewster 19'; Ayew 67'	Report	Byrne 16'	Stadium: Liberty Stadium; Attendance: 15,659; Referee: James Linington

25 January 2020 29	Stoke City	2–0	Swansea City	Stoke-on-Trent
15:00 GMT	Clucas 55'; McClean 90+1'	Report		Stadium: bet365 Stadium; Attendance: 22,593; Referee: Gavin Ward

1 February 2020 30	Preston North End	1–1	Swansea City	Preston
15:00 GMT	Sinclair 28'	Report	Brewster 33'	Stadium: Deepdale; Attendance: 12,502; Referee: Geoff Eltringham

8 February 2020 31	Swansea City	2–3	Derby County	Swansea
15:00 GMT	Dhanda 56'; Naughton 58'	Report	Waghorn 8'; Holmes 64'; Lawrence 80'	Stadium: Liberty Stadium; Attendance: 16,230; Referee: Matt Donohue

11 February 2020 32	Swansea City	0–0	Queens Park Rangers	Swansea
19:45 GMT		Report		Stadium: Liberty Stadium; Attendance: 14,778; Referee: Andy Woolmer

14 February 2020 33	Hull City	4–4	Swansea City	Kingston upon Hull
19:45 GMT	Lopes 6'; Maddison 50'; Wilks 61'; Eaves 90+5'	Report	Routledge 13'; Naughton 55'; Garrick 77'; Brewster 84'	Stadium: KCOM Stadium; Attendance: 9,757; Referee: David Webb

22 February 2020 34	Swansea City	3–1	Huddersfield Town	Swansea
15:00 GMT	Ayew 28'; Fulton 80'; Garrick 90'	Report	Mounié 78'	Stadium: Liberty Stadium; Attendance: 15,148; Referee: Andy Davies

26 February 2020 35	Fulham	1–0	Swansea City	Fulham
19:45 GMT	Mitrović 90+4'	Report		Stadium: Craven Cottage; Attendance: 17,626; Referee: Tim Robinson

29 February 2020 36	Blackburn Rovers	2–2	Swansea City	Blackburn
15:00 GMT	Gallagher 25'; Johnson 90+5'	Report	Brewster 45'; Ayew 48' (pen.)	Stadium: Ewood Park; Attendance: 13,099; Referee: Peter Bankes

7 March 2020 37	Swansea City	0–0	West Bromwich Albion	Swansea
15:00 GMT		Report		Stadium: Liberty Stadium; Attendance: 16,788; Referee: Robert Jones

20 June 2020 38	Middlesbrough	0–3	Swansea City	Middlesbrough
15:00 BST		Report	Brewster 18', 21'; Ayew 34' (pen.)	Stadium: Riverside Stadium; Attendance: 0 Referee: Tony Harrington
Note: Season was suspended until 3 April 2020, due to the COVID-19 pandemic. The match was rescheduled to 20 June.

27 June 2020 39	Swansea City	0–1	Luton Town	Swansea
12:30 BST		Report	Collins 72'	Stadium: Liberty Stadium; Attendance: 0 Referee: Andy Woolmer
Note: Season was suspended until 3 April 2020, due to the COVID-19 pandemic. The match was rescheduled to 27 June.

30 June 2020 40	Millwall	1–1	Swansea City	Bermondsey
17:00 BST	Bennett 21'	Report	Białkowski 66' (o.g.)	Stadium: The Den; Attendance: 0 Referee: James Linington
Note: Season was suspended until 3 April 2020, due to the COVID-19 pandemic. The match was rescheduled to 30 June.

5 July 2020 41	Swansea City	2–1	Sheffield Wednesday	Swansea
12:00 BST	Brewster 52'; Ayew 66' (pen.)	Report	Nuhiu 90+4'	Stadium: Liberty Stadium; Attendance: 0 Referee: Stephen Martin
Note: On 3 April, the English Football League decided to postpone all football until safe to do so due to the COVID-19 pandemic. The match was rescheduled to 5 July.

8 July 2020 42	Birmingham City	1–3	Swansea City	Bordesley
18:00 BST	Jutkiewicz 5'	Report	Brewster 12'; Cabango 45'; Fulton 52'	Stadium: St Andrew's Trillion Trophy Stadium; Attendance: 0 Referee: Jarred Gillett
Note: On 3 April, the English Football League decided to postpone all football until safe to do so due to the COVID-19 pandemic. The match was rescheduled to 8 July.

12 July 2020 43	Swansea City	0–1	Leeds United	Swansea
15:30 BST		Report	Hernández 89'	Stadium: Liberty Stadium; Attendance: 0 Referee: Keith Stroud
Note: On 3 April, the English Football League decided to postpone all football until safe to do so due to the COVID-19 pandemic. The match was rescheduled to 12 July.

15 July 2020 44	Nottingham Forest	2–2	Swansea City	West Bridgford
18:00 BST	Ameobi 20', 55'	Report	Brewster 8'; Ayew 45' (pen.); Naughton (red card) 82'	Stadium: City Ground; Attendance: 0 Referee: Oliver Langford
Note: On 3 April, the English Football League decided to postpone all football until safe to do so due to the COVID-19 pandemic. The match was rescheduled to 15 July.

18 July 2020 45	Swansea City	1–0	Bristol City	Swansea
15:00 BST	Roberts 45+2'	Report		Stadium: Liberty Stadium; Attendance: 0 Referee: Darren Bond
Note: On 3 April, the English Football League decided to postpone all football until safe to do so due to the COVID-19 pandemic. The match was rescheduled to 18 July.

22 July 2020 46	Reading	1–4	Swansea City	Reading
19:30 BST	Méïté (red card) 40'; Pușcaș 43' (pen.)	Report	Brewster 17'; Routledge 66', 90+1'; Cullen 84'	Stadium: Madejski Stadium; Attendance: 0 Referee: Steve Martin
Note: On 3 April, the English Football League decided to postpone all football until safe to do so due to the COVID-19 pandemic. The match was rescheduled to 22 July.

==== Championship play-offs ====
26 July 2020 Semi-final 1	Swansea City	1–0	Brentford	Swansea
18:30 BST	Ayew 81'	Report	Henry (red card) 65'	Stadium: Liberty Stadium; Attendance: 0 Referee: Keith Stroud

29 July 2020 Semi-final 2	Brentford	3–1 (3–2 agg.)	Swansea City	Brentford
19:45 BST	Watkins 11'; Marcondes 15'; Mbeumo 46'	Report	Brewster 78'	Stadium: Griffin Park; Attendance: 0 Referee: Chris Kavanagh

=== FA Cup ===
The second round draw was made live on BBC Two from Etihad Stadium, Micah Richards and Tony Adams conducted the draw.

Win Draw Loss

5 January 2020 Third round	Queens Park Rangers	5–1	Swansea City	Shepherd's Bush
15:00 GMT	Hugill 21', 45'; Osayi-Samuel 29'; Wallace 76'; Scowen 90+1'	Report	Byers 60'; Fulton (yellow card) 64'	Stadium: Kiyan Prince Foundation Stadium; Attendance: 6,712; Referee: Steve Martin

=== EFL Cup ===
The first round draw was made on 20 June. The second round draw was made on 13 August 2019 following the conclusion of all but one first-round matches. The third round draw was confirmed on 28 August 2019, live on Sky Sports.

Win Draw Loss

13 August 2019 First round	Swansea City	3–1	Northampton Town	Swansea
19:45 BST	Ayew 80', 88'; Byers 83'	Report	Warburton 61'	Stadium: Liberty Stadium; Attendance: 8,058; Referee: Kevin Johnson

28 August 2019 Second round	Swansea City	6–0	Cambridge United	Swansea
19:45 BST	Peterson 1'; Byers 20'; Surridge 24', 45+1'; Garrick 31'; Routledge 76'	Report		Stadium: Liberty Stadium; Attendance: 8,763; Referee: Michael Salisbury

24 September 2019 Third round	Watford	2–1	Swansea City	Watford
19:45 BST	Welbeck 28'; Pereyra 79'	Report	Surridge 34'	Stadium: Vicarage Road; Attendance: 8,903; Referee: Darren Bond

== Statistics ==
=== Appearances, goals, and cards ===
No.	Pos	Nat	Player	Total		Championship		Play-offs		FA Cup		EFL Cup	
No.	Pos	Nat	Player	Apps	Goals	Apps	Goals	Apps	Goals	Apps	Goals	Apps	Goals
Goalkeepers
25	GK	(Netherlands) NED	Erwin Mulder	6	0	3+1	0	2	0	0	0	0	0
27	GK	(England) ENG	Freddie Woodman	43	0	43	0	0	0	0	0	0	0
Defenders
2	DF	(England) ENG	Marc Guehi	14	0	11+1	0	2	0	0	0	0	0
4	DF	(Wales) WAL	Joe Rodon	21	0	20+1	0	0	0	0	0	0	0
5	DF	(Netherlands) NED	Mike van der Hoorn	31	1	27+1	1	2	0	0	0	1	0
20	DF	(England) ENG	Ben Wilmot	23	2	16+5	2	0	0	0	0	2	0
23	DF	(Wales) WAL	Connor Roberts	42	1	32+6	1	2	0	1	0	1	0
24	DF	(England) ENG	Jake Bidwell	40	0	36+1	0	2	0	1	0	0	0
26	DF	(England) ENG	Kyle Naughton	35	3	28+4	3	1	0	0	0	2	0
30	DF	(Wales) WAL	Tivonge Rushesha	1	0	0	0	0	0	0	0	0+1	0
44	DF	(Wales) WAL	Ben Cabango	26	1	19+2	1	1+1	0	0	0	3	0
Midfielders
6	MF	(Scotland) SCO	Jay Fulton	39	3	29+7	3	2	0	1	0	0	0
8	MF	(England) ENG	Matt Grimes	48	0	46	0	2	0	0	0	0	0
10	MF	(Kosovo) KOS	Bersant Celina	37	2	28+7	2	0+1	0	0+1	0	0	0
12	MF	(England) ENG	Nathan Dyer	12	1	7+3	1	0	0	1	0	1	0
14	MF	(England) ENG	Tom Carroll	10	0	5+3	0	0	0	1	0	1	0
15	MF	(England) ENG	Wayne Routledge	24	5	10+11	4	0	0	0	0	2+1	1
21	MF	(England) ENG	Yan Dhanda	18	3	9+7	3	0+1	0	0	0	1	0
22	MF	(Ghana) GHA	André Ayew	47	18	43+1	15	2	1	0	0	1	2
28	MF	(Scotland) SCO	George Byers	39	5	22+13	2	0	0	0+1	1	3	2
33	MF	(England) ENG	Conor Gallagher	21	0	19	0	2	0	0	0	0	0
49	MF	(Netherlands) NED	Kees de Boer	1	0	0	0	0	0	0	0	0+1	0
Forwards
18	FW	(France) FRA	Aldo Kalulu	12	0	7+4	0	0	0	1	0	0	0
19	FW	(England) ENG	Rhian Brewster	22	11	19+1	10	2	1	0	0	0	0
32	FW	(Wales) WAL	Liam Cullen	6	1	0+6	1	0	0	0	0	0	0
41	FW	(Jamaica) JAM	Jordon Garrick	14	3	1+10	2	0	0	0	0	1+2	1
Out On Loan
3	DF	(Wales) WAL	Declan John	5	0	0+1	0	0	0	1	0	3	0
7	MF	(Scotland) SCO	Barrie McKay	8	0	0+4	0	0	0	1	0	1+2	0
11	MF	(Sweden) SWE	Kristoffer Peterson	11	1	4+3	0	0	0	1	0	3	1
34	MF	(Wales) WAL	Jack Evans	1	0	0	0	0	0	0	0	0+1	0
Left During Season
1	GK	(Sweden) SWE	Kristoffer Nordfeldt	4	0	0	0	0	0	1	0	3	0
9	FW	(Spain) ESP	Borja Bastón	21	6	15+5	6	0	0	0+1	0	0	0
19	FW	(England) ENG	Sam Surridge	21	5	7+13	4	0	0	0	0	1	1

Last updated: 29 July 2020
Source: https://www.whoscored.com/Teams/259/Show/Wales-Swansea

==== Disciplinary record ====
As of 29 July 2020

Rank	No.	Nat.	Po.	Name	Championship			Play-offs			FA Cup			League Cup			Total		
Rank	No.	Nat.	Po.	Name	Booked	(yellow card) (yellow-red card)	Sent off (straight red)	Booked	(yellow card) (yellow-red card)	Sent off (straight red)	Booked	(yellow card) (yellow-red card)	Sent off (straight red)	Booked	(yellow card) (yellow-red card)	Sent off (straight red)	Booked	(yellow card) (yellow-red card)	Sent off (straight red)
1	6	(Scotland)	MF	Jay Fulton	10	0	0	0	0	0	1	0	0	0	0	0	11	0	0
2	8	(England)	MF	Matt Grimes	6	0	0	0	0	0	0	0	0	1	0	0	7	0	0
2	17	(England)	FW	Rhian Brewster	6	0	0	1	0	0	0	0	0	0	0	0	7	0	0
2	28	(Scotland)	MF	George Byers	7	0	0	0	0	0	0	0	0	0	0	0	7	0	0
5	24	(England)	DF	Jake Bidwell	3	0	1	1	0	0	0	0	0	0	0	0	4	0	1
5	26	(England)	DF	Kyle Naughton	5	0	0	0	0	0	0	0	0	0	0	0	5	0	0
7	22	(Ghana)	MF	Andre Ayew	3	0	0	1	0	0	0	0	0	0	0	0	4	0	0
7	44	(Wales)	DF	Ben Cabango	2	0	0	2	0	0	0	0	0	0	0	0	4	0	0
9	5	(Netherlands)	DF	Mike van der Hoorn	3	0	0	0	0	0	0	0	0	0	0	0	3	0	0
9	9	(Spain)	FW	Borja Baston	3	0	0	0	0	0	0	0	0	0	0	0	3	0	0
9	20	(England)	DF	Ben Wilmot	3	0	0	0	0	0	0	0	0	0	0	0	3	0	0
9	21	(England)	MF	Yan Dhanda	2	0	0	1	0	0	0	0	0	0	0	0	3	0	0
9	23	(Wales)	DF	Connor Roberts	2	0	0	1	0	0	0	0	0	0	0	0	3	0	0
9	33	(England)	MF	Conor Gallagher	3	0	0	0	0	0	0	0	0	0	0	0	3	0	0
15	4	(Wales)	DF	Joe Rodon	2	0	0	0	0	0	0	0	0	0	0	0	2	0	0
15	10	(Kosovo)	MF	Bersant Celina	2	0	0	0	0	0	0	0	0	0	0	0	2	0	0
15	14	(England)	MF	Tom Carroll	1	1	0	0	0	0	0	0	0	0	0	0	1	1	0
15	18	(France)	FW	Aldo Kalulu	2	0	0	0	0	0	0	0	0	0	0	0	2	0	0
19	2	(England)	DF	Marc Guehi	1	0	0	0	0	0	0	0	0	0	0	0	1	0	0
19	12	(England)	MF	Nathan Dyer	1	0	0	0	0	0	0	0	0	0	0	0	1	0	0
19	15	(England)	MF	Wayne Routledge	1	0	0	0	0	0	0	0	0	0	0	0	1	0	0
19	27	(England)	GK	Freddie Woodman	1	0	0	0	0	0	0	0	0	0	0	0	1	0	0
19	41	(England)	FW	Jordan Garrick	1	0	0	0	0	0	0	0	0	0	0	0	1	0	0
Total					70	1	1	7	0	0	1	0	0	1	0	0	79	1	1
