= 2020–21 Swansea City A.F.C. season =

Swansea City
2020–21 season
- Chairman: Julian Winter
- Head coach: Steve Cooper
- Stadium: Liberty Stadium
- Championship: 4th
- Play-offs: Runners-up
- FA Cup: Fifth round
- EFL Cup: First round
- Top goalscorer: League: André Ayew (16 goals); All: André Ayew (17 goals)
Home colours	Away colours	Third colours

The 2020–21 season was the 101st season of Swansea City in the English football league system and third consecutive season in the Championship. They also competed in the FA Cup and EFL Cup.

== Club ==
=== First-team staff ===
Position	Name
Head coach	(Wales) Steve Cooper
Assistant coaches	(England) Mike Marsh
Assistant coaches	(England) Alan Tate
Fitness coach	(England) David Tivey
Goalkeeping coach	(Wales) Martyn Margetson
Head of Performance Analysis	(England) Steve Rands
Head of recruitment	(England) Andy Scott

=== First-team squad ===
As of 4 February 2021

Note: Flags indicate national team as defined under FIFA eligibility rules; some limited exceptions apply. Players may hold more than one non-FIFA nationality.

No.	Pos.	Nation	Player
1	GK	ENG	Freddie Woodman (on loan from Newcastle United)
2	DF	ENG	Ryan Bennett
3	DF	IRL	Ryan Manning
5	DF	ENG	Marc Guéhi (on loan from Chelsea)
6	MF	SCO	Jay Fulton
7	MF	ENG	Korey Smith
8	MF	ENG	Matt Grimes (captain)
9	FW	JAM	Jamal Lowe
10	FW	GHA	André Ayew
11	FW	USA	Jordan Morris (on loan from Seattle Sounders FC)
13	GK	GER	Steven Benda
14	MF	IRL	Conor Hourihane (on loan from Aston Villa)
15	MF	ENG	Wayne Routledge
17	FW	ENG	Morgan Whittaker

No.	Pos.	Nation	Player
18	GK	ENG	Ben Hamer
19	FW	USA	Paul Arriola (on loan from D.C. United)
20	FW	WAL	Liam Cullen
21	MF	ENG	Yan Dhanda
22	DF	ENG	Joel Latibeaudiere
23	DF	WAL	Connor Roberts
24	DF	ENG	Jake Bidwell
26	DF	ENG	Kyle Naughton
27	GK	WAL	Josh Gould
30	DF	WAL	Tivonge Rushesha
34	DF	WAL	Kieron Freeman
36	DF	WAL	Brandon Cooper
44	DF	WAL	Ben Cabango

== Transfers ==
=== Transfers in ===
Date	Position	Nationality	Name	From	Fee	Ref.
9 August 2020	DM	(England)	Korey Smith	Bristol City	Free transfer	
27 August 2020	RW	(England)	Jamal Lowe	Wigan Athletic	£800,000	
16 October 2020	CB	(England)	Joel Latibeaudiere	Manchester City	Undisclosed	
16 October 2020	CB	(England)	Ryan Bennett	Wolverhampton Wanderers	Free transfer	
16 October 2020	LB	(Republic of Ireland)	Ryan Manning	Queens Park Rangers	£250,000	
15 January 2021	GK	(England)	Ben Hamer	Huddersfield Town	Undisclosed	
1 February 2021	FW	(England)	Morgan Whittaker	Derby County	Undisclosed	
1 February 2021	RB	(Wales)	Kieron Freeman	Swindon Town	Undisclosed	

=== Loans in ===
Date from	Position	Nationality	Name	From	Date until	Ref.
16 August 2020	GK	(England)	Freddie Woodman	Newcastle United	End of season	
25 August 2020	CM	(England)	Morgan Gibbs-White	Wolverhampton Wanderers	6 January 2021	
26 August 2020	CB	(England)	Marc Guéhi	Chelsea	End of season	
2 October 2020	CF	(Sweden)	Viktor Gyökeres	Brighton & Hove Albion	14 January 2021	
16 October 2020	AM	(England)	Kasey Palmer	Bristol City	5 January 2021	
19 January 2021	CM	(Republic of Ireland)	Conor Hourihane	Aston Villa	End of season	
22 January 2021	LW	(United States)	Jordan Morris	Seattle Sounders FC	End of season	
1 February 2021	RW	(United States)	Paul Arriola	D.C. United	End of season	

=== Transfers out ===
Date	Position	Nationality	Name	To	Fee	Ref.
1 July 2020	CF	(England)	Courtney Baker-Richardson	Barrow	Released	
1 July 2020	CM	(Wales)	Cameron Berry	Inter Leipzig	Released	
1 July 2020	CM	(Netherlands)	Kees de Boer	ADO Den Haag	Released	
1 July 2020	AM	(Wales)	Keiran Evans	Unattached	Released	
1 July 2020	MF	(Iceland)	Arnór Guðjohnsen	Fylkir	Released	
1 July 2020	LW	(Ecuador)	Jefferson Montero	Querétaro	Released	
1 July 2020	CM	(Wales)	Tom Price	Cardiff Metropolitan University	Released	
1 July 2020	LW	(Republic of Ireland)	Marc Walsh	Unattached	Released	
31 July 2020	GK	(Netherlands)	Erwin Mulder	Heerenveen	Free transfer	
5 August 2020	CB	(Netherlands)	Mike van der Hoorn	Arminia Bielefeld	Released	
9 September 2020	AM	(Kosovo)	Bersant Celina	Dijon	Undisclosed	
5 October 2020	LW	(Sweden)	Kristoffer Peterson	Fortuna Düsseldorf	Undisclosed	
16 October 2020	CB	(Wales)	Joe Rodon	Tottenham Hotspur	Undisclosed	
8 January 2021	CM	(Wales)	Jack Evans	Newport County	Free transfer	
26 January 2021	CB	(Wales)	Joe Lewis	Torquay United	Undisclosed	
8 February 2021	CF	(Sweden)	Joel Asoro	Djurgården	Undisclosed	

=== Loans out ===
Start date	Position	Nationality	Name	To	Expiry date	Ref.
7 September 2020	CB	(Wales)	Brandon Cooper	Newport County	5 January 2021	
9 September 2020	CM	(Wales)	Jack Evans	Pafos	1 January 2021	
16 September 2020	CF	(Sweden)	Joel Asoro	Genoa	1 February 2021	
23 September 2020	GK	(England)	Josh Gould	Barry Town United	12 January 2021	
25 September 2020	LW	(Scotland)	Barrie McKay	Fleetwood Town	End of season	
7 January 2021	LB	(Wales)	Declan John	Bolton Wanderers	End of season	
23 January 2021	CM	(Scotland)	George Byers	Portsmouth	End of season	
1 February 2021	LB	(Wales)	Matt Blake	Cardiff Met	End of season	
1 February 2021	ST	(Wales)	Josh Thomas	Cardiff Met	End of season	
1 February 2021	RW	(Jamaica)	Jordon Garrick	Swindon Town	End of season	
21 February 2021	CB	(Wales)	Cameron Evans	Waterford	30 November 2021	

=== New contracts ===
Date signed	Position	Nationality	Name	Contract length	Expiry date	Ref.
10 December 2020	DF	(Wales)	Brandon Cooper	2.5 Years	30 June 2023	
21 December 2020	WG	(Nigeria)	Adrian Akande	2.5 Years	30 June 2023	
21 December 2020	CM	(Wales)	Harry Jones	1.5 Years	30 June 2022	
21 December 2020	ST	(Wales)	Josh Thomas	2.5 Years	30 June 2023	
24 December 2020	GK	(Wales)	Lewis Webb	3.5 Years	30 June 2024	
13 January 2021	GK	(Germany)	Steven Benda	3.5 Years	30 June 2024	
18 January 2021	CM	(Scotland)	Jay Fulton	3.5 Years	30 June 2024	
26 January 2021	RB	(Wales)	Tivonge Rushesha	2.5 Years	30 June 2023	
27 January 2021	ST	(Wales)	Liam Cullen	3.5 Years	30 June 2024	

== Pre-season and friendlies ==
Win Draw Loss Fixtures

29 August 2020 Friendly	Southampton	7–1	Swansea City	Southampton
	Adams 6'; Redmond 13'; Ings 20' (pen.), 42'; Ward-Prowse 34' (pen.), 45'; Bertrand 35'	Report	Fulton 110'	Stadium: St. Mary's Stadium; Attendance: 0

1 September 2020 Friendly	Swansea City	2–1	Forest Green Rovers	Swansea
13:30 BST	Lowe 9'; Dhanda 28'	Report	Wilson 36'	Stadium: Liberty Stadium; Attendance: 0 Referee: Dean John

== Competitions ==
=== Overview ===
Competition	Record							
Competition	G	W	D	L	GF	GA	GD	Win %
Championship	46	23	11	12	56	39	+17	50.00
FA Cup	3	2	0	1	8	4	+4	66.67
EFL Cup	1	0	0	1	0	2	−2	0.00
Total	50	25	11	14	64	45	+19	50.00

Updated to match played 8 May 2021
Source: Competitions

=== Championship ===
==== League table ====
Pos	Team	Pld	W	D	L	GF	GA	GD	Pts	Promotion, qualification or relegation
1	Norwich City (C, P)	46	29	10	7	75	36	+39	97	Promotion to the Premier League
2	Watford (P)	46	27	10	9	63	30	+33	91	Promotion to the Premier League
3	Brentford (O, P)	46	24	15	7	79	42	+37	87	Qualification for Championship play-offs
4	Swansea City	46	23	11	12	56	39	+17	80	Qualification for Championship play-offs
5	Barnsley	46	23	9	14	58	50	+8	78	Qualification for Championship play-offs
6	Bournemouth	46	22	11	13	73	46	+27	77	Qualification for Championship play-offs
7	Reading	46	19	13	14	62	54	+8	70	

Source: EFL Official Website
Rules for classification: 1) Points; 2) Goal difference; 3) Number of goals scored; 4) Head-to-head results; 5) Wins; 6) Away goals; 7) Penalty points (sec 9.5); 8) 12-point sending off offences
(C) Champions; (O) Play-off winners; (P) Promoted

==== Results summary ====
Overall								Home						Away					
Pld	W	D	L	GF	GA	GD	Pts	W	D	L	GF	GA	GD	W	D	L	GF	GA	GD
46	23	11	12	56	39	+17	80	12	6	5	27	16	+11	11	5	7	29	23	+6

Last updated: 8 May 2021.

==== Results by matchday ====
Matchday	1	2	3	4	5	6	7	8	9	10	11	12	13	14	15	16	17	18	19	20	21	22	23	24	25	26	27	28	29	30	31	32	33	34	35	36	37	38	39	40	41	42	43	44	45	46
Ground	A	H	A	H	H	A	A	H	H	A	A	H	H	A	A	H	H	A	A	H	A	H	H	A	H	A	H	H	A	H	H	A	H	A	A	A	H	A	H	A	A	H	H	A	H	A
Result	W	D	W	W	L	D	D	W	W	D	L	W	D	W	L	W	D	W	L	W	W	D	W	W	D	W	W	W	L	W	L	W	W	D	W	L	L	L	L	W	W	D	L	D	W	L
Position	8	6	3	4	4	5	6	2	2	2	6	4	4	4	7	4	4	3	4	3	2	3	2	2	2	2	3	3	4	4	4	4	3	3	3	3	3	3	4	4	3	3	5	5	4	4

Updated to match(es) played on 8 May 2021. Source: https://www.swanseacity.com/fixture/list/149?season=2020&month=9
A = Away; H = Home; W = Win; D = Draw; L = Loss

==== Matches ====
The 2020/21 season fixtures were released on 21 August.

12 September 2020 1	Preston North End	0–1	Swansea City	Preston
15:00 BST		Report	Gibbs-White 53'	Stadium: Deepdale; Attendance: 0 Referee: Robert Jones

19 September 2020 2	Swansea City	0–0	Birmingham City	Swansea
15:00 BST		Report		Stadium: Liberty Stadium; Attendance: 0 Referee: Gavin Ward

26 September 2020 3	Wycombe Wanderers	0–2	Swansea City	High Wycombe
12:30 BST		Report	Ayew 13'; Lowe 23'	Stadium: Adams Park; Attendance: 0 Referee: Geoff Eltringham

3 October 2020 4	Swansea City	2–1	Millwall	Swansea
15:00 BST	Bidwell 46'; Cabango 68'	Report	Bradshaw 51'	Stadium: Liberty Stadium; Attendance: 0 Referee: Stephen Martin

17 October 2020 5	Swansea City	1−2	Huddersfield Town	Swansea
15:00 BST	Ayew 33' (pen.)	Report	Toffolo 23'; Koroma 67'	Stadium: Liberty Stadium; Attendance: 0 Referee: Tony Harrington

20 October 2020 6	Coventry City	1−1	Swansea City	Birmingham
19:45 BST	Shipley 19'	Report	Ayew 41'	Stadium: St Andrew's; Attendance: 0 Referee: Keith Stroud

24 October 2020 7	Bristol City	1–1	Swansea City	Ashton Gate
15:00 BST	Wells 83' (pen.)	Report	Lowe 51'	Stadium: Ashton Gate Stadium; Attendance: 0 Referee: Oliver Langford

27 October 2020 8	Swansea City	2–0	Stoke City	Swansea
19:45 GMT	Fulton 30'; Palmer 87'	Report		Stadium: Liberty Stadium; Attendance: 0 Referee: Andre Marriner

31 October 2020 9	Swansea City	2−0	Blackburn Rovers	Swansea
15:00 GMT	Cabango 25'; Ayew 61'	Report		Stadium: Liberty Stadium; Attendance: 0 Referee: Dean Whitestone

3 November 2020 10	Brentford	1–1	Swansea City	Brentford
19:00 GMT	Toney 36'	Report	Ayew 77'	Stadium: Brentford Community Stadium; Attendance: 0 Referee: Stephen Martin

7 November 2020 11	Norwich City	1–0	Swansea City	Norwich
15:00 GMT	Stiepermann 84'	Report		Stadium: Carrow Road; Attendance: 0 Referee: Darren England

21 November 2020 12	Swansea City	1–0	Rotherham United	Swansea
15:00 GMT	Grimes 28'	Report		Stadium: Liberty Stadium; Attendance: 0 Referee: Matt Donohue

25 November 2020 13	Swansea City	1–1	Sheffield Wednesday	Swansea
19:45 GMT	Ayew 60'	Report	Reach 27'	Stadium: Liberty Stadium; Attendance: 0 Referee: Andy Woolmer

29 November 2020 14	Nottingham Forest	0–1	Swansea City	West Bridgford
12:00 GMT		Report	Roberts 43'	Stadium: The City Ground; Attendance: 0 Referee: Tony Harrington

2 December 2020 15	Middlesbrough	2–1	Swansea City	Middlesbrough
19:00 GMT	Watmore 26', 67'	Report	Dhanda 78'	Stadium: Riverside Stadium; Attendance: 0 Referee: Keith Stroud

5 December 2020 16	Swansea City	2–0	Luton Town	Swansea
15:00 GMT	Roberts 2'; Ayew 89'	Report		Stadium: Liberty Stadium; Attendance: 0 Referee: Leigh Doughty

8 December 2020 17	Swansea City	0–0	Bournemouth	Swansea
19:45 GMT		Report		Stadium: Liberty Stadium; Attendance: 0 Referee: Peter Bankes

12 December 2020 18	Cardiff City	0–2	Swansea City	Cardiff
12:30 GMT		Report	Lowe 6', 72'	Stadium: Cardiff City Stadium; Attendance: 0 Referee: John Brooks

16 December 2020 19	Derby County	2–0	Swansea City	Derby
17:30 GMT	Kazim-Richards 4'; Jóźwiak 37'	Report		Stadium: Pride Park Stadium; Attendance: 0 Referee: Gavin Ward

19 December 2020 20	Swansea City	2–0	Barnsley	Swansea
15:00 GMT	Lowe 2'; Adeboyejo 66' (o.g.)	Report		Stadium: Liberty Stadium; Attendance: 0 Referee: Andy Davies

26 December 2020 21	Queens Park Rangers	0–2	Swansea City	Shepherd's Bush
15:00 GMT		Report	Ayew 44'; Lowe 54'	Stadium: Loftus Road; Attendance: 0 Referee: Stephen Martin

30 December 2020 22	Swansea City	0–0	Reading	Swansea
20:00 GMT		Report		Stadium: Liberty Stadium; Attendance: 0 Referee: David Webb

2 January 2021 23	Swansea City	2–1	Watford	Swansea
15:00 GMT	Lowe 43', 67'	Report	Cleverley 20'	Stadium: Liberty Stadium; Attendance: 0 Referee: Darren Bond

16 January 2021 24	Barnsley	0–2	Swansea City	Barnsley
19:45 GMT		Report	Cabango 45+1'; Lowe 55'	Stadium: Oakwell; Attendance: 0 Referee: Jeremy Simpson

19 January 2021 —	Blackburn Rovers	P–P	Swansea City	Blackburn
19:00 GMT				Stadium: Ewood Park
Note: This match was postponed due to a waterlogged pitch.

27 January 2021 25	Swansea City	1–1	Brentford	Swansea
19:00 GMT	Naughton (yellow card) 44' (yellow-red card) 69'; Hourihane 78'	Report	Fosu 74'	Stadium: Liberty Stadium; Attendance: 0 Referee: John Brooks

30 January 2021 26	Rotherham United	1–3	Swansea City	Rotherham
15:00 GMT	Ladapo 65'	Report	Hourihane 28'; Grimes 38'; Fulton 74'	Stadium: New York Stadium; Attendance: 0 Referee: Tony Harrington

5 February 2021 27	Swansea City	2–0	Norwich City	Swansea
20:15 GMT	Ayew 42'; Hourihane 48'	Report		Stadium: Liberty Stadium; Attendance: 0 Referee: Simon Hooper

13 February 2021 —	Sheffield Wednesday	P–P	Swansea City	Owlerton
15:00 GMT				Stadium: Hillsborough Stadium
Note: This match was postponed due to a frozen pitch.

17 February 2021 28	Swansea City	1–0	Nottingham Forest	Swansea
19:00 GMT	Roberts 87'	Report		Stadium: Liberty Stadium; Attendance: 0 Referee: Geoff Eltringham

20 February 2021 29	Huddersfield Town	4–1	Swansea City	Huddersfield
15:00 GMT	Campbell 22'; O'Brien 49'; Holmes 52', 55'	Report	Hourihane 45+1'	Stadium: Kirklees Stadium; Attendance: 0 Referee: John Brooks

24 February 2021 30	Swansea City	1–0	Coventry City	Swansea
19:00 GMT	Cabango 54'	Report		Stadium: Liberty Stadium; Attendance: 0 Referee: Andy Woolmer

27 February 2021 31	Swansea City	1–3	Bristol City	Swansea
15:00 GMT	Ayew 55' (pen.)	Report	Wells 66'; Palmer 80'; Semenyo 90+7'	Stadium: Liberty Stadium; Attendance: 0 Referee: Keith Stroud

3 March 2021 32	Stoke City	1–2	Swansea City	Stoke-on-Trent
20:15 GMT	Powell 7'	Report	Roberts 19'; Ayew 90+6' (pen.)	Stadium: Bet365 Stadium; Attendance: 0 Referee: David Webb

6 March 2021 33	Swansea City	2–1	Middlesbrough	Swansea
15:00 GMT	Ayew 40', 90+7' (pen.)	Report	Morsy 90+1'	Stadium: Liberty Stadium; Attendance: 0 Referee: Gavin Ward

9 March 2021 34	Blackburn Rovers	1–1	Swansea City	Blackburn
18:00 GMT	Dack 37'	Report	Ayew 41' (pen.)	Stadium: Ewood Park; Attendance: 0 Referee: Robert Jones

13 March 2021 35	Luton Town	0–1	Swansea City	Luton
12:15 GMT		Report	Hourihane 3'	Stadium: Kenilworth Road; Attendance: 0 Referee: Darren Bond

16 March 2021 36	Bournemouth	3–0	Swansea City	King's Park
19:45 GMT	Billing 9'; Latibeaudiere 45+1' (o.g.); Danjuma 87'	Report		Stadium: Vitality Stadium; Attendance: 0 Referee: James Linington

20 March 2021 37	Swansea City	0–1	Cardiff City	Swansea
17:30 GMT		Report	Flint 8'	Stadium: The Liberty Stadium; Attendance: 0 Referee: Paul Tierney

2 April 2021 38	Birmingham City	1–0	Swansea City	Bordesley
20:00 BST	Hogan 90+1' (pen.)	Report		Stadium: St Andrew's Stadium; Attendance: 0 Referee: Tony Harrington

5 April 2021 39	Swansea City	0–1	Preston North End	Swansea
15:00 BST		Report	Grimes 90+1' (o.g.)	Stadium: The Liberty Stadium; Attendance: 0 Referee: Peter Bankes

10 April 2021 40	Millwall	0–3	Swansea City	Bermondsey
12:30 BST		Report	Ayew 45+1'; Lowe 76', 85'	Stadium: The Den; Attendance: 0 Referee: Robert Jones

13 April 2021 41	Sheffield Wednesday	0–2	Swansea City	Owlerton
18:00 BST		Report	Lowe 31'; Fulton 73'	Stadium: Hillsborough; Attendance: 0 Referee: Matt Donohue

17 April 2021 42	Swansea City	2–2	Wycombe Wanderers	Swansea
12:30 BST	Lowe 80' (pen.); Cullen 83'	Report	Muskwe 46'; McCleary 51'	Stadium: Liberty Stadium; Attendance: 0 Referee: Keith Stroud

20 April 2021 43	Swansea City	0–1	Queens Park Rangers	Swansea
19:00 BST		Report	Dykes 90'	Stadium: Liberty Stadium; Attendance: 0 Referee: Jarred Gillett

25 April 2021 44	Reading	2–2	Swansea City	Reading
12:00 BST	Méïté 31'; Esteves 90+2'	Report	Lowe 67'; Ayew 83'	Stadium: Madejski Stadium; Attendance: 0 Referee: Simon Hooper

1 May 2021 45	Swansea City	2–1	Derby County	Swansea
15:00 BST	Whittaker 63'; Roberts 66'	Report	Lawrence 48'	Stadium: Liberty Stadium; Attendance: 0 Referee: Darren Bond

8 May 2021 46	Watford	2–0	Swansea City	Watford
12:30 BST	Gray 56'; Success 87'	Report		Stadium: Vicarage Road; Attendance: 0 Referee: Geoff Eltringham

==== Play-offs ====
17 May 2021 Semi-final first leg	Barnsley	0–1	Swansea City	Barnsley
20:15 BST		Report	Ayew 39'	Stadium: Oakwell Stadium; Attendance: 3,787; Referee: Geoff Eltringham

22 May 2021 Semi-final second leg	Swansea City	1–1 (2–1 agg.)	Barnsley	Swansea
18:30 BST	Grimes 39'	Report	Woodrow 71'	Stadium: Liberty Stadium; Attendance: 3,000; Referee: John Brooks

29 May 2021 Final	Brentford	2–0	Swansea City	Wembley
15:00 BST	Toney 10' (pen.); Marcondes 20'	Report		Stadium: Wembley Stadium; Attendance: 11,689; Referee: Chris Kavanagh

=== FA Cup ===
The third round draw was made on 30 November, with Premier League and EFL Championship clubs all entering the competition. The draw for the fourth and fifth round were made on 11 January, conducted by Peter Crouch.

9 January 2021 Third round	Stevenage	0–2	Swansea City	Stevenage
15:00 GMT		Report	Routledge 7'; Gyökeres 50'	Stadium: Broadhall Way; Attendance: 0 Referee: Michael Salisbury

23 January 2021 Fourth round	Swansea City	5–1	Nottingham Forest	Swansea
15:00 GMT	Cullen 7', 67'; Grimes 29', 61' (pen.); O. Cooper 85'	Report	Knockaert 56'	Stadium: Liberty Stadium; Attendance: 0 Referee: Kevin Friend

10 February 2021 Fifth round	Swansea City	1–3	Manchester City	Swansea
17:30 GMT	Whittaker 77'	Report	Walker 30'; Sterling 47'; Gabriel Jesus 50'	Stadium: Liberty Stadium; Attendance: 0 Referee: Peter Bankes

=== EFL Cup ===
The first round draw was made on 18 August, live on Sky Sports, by Paul Merson.

5 September 2020 First round	Newport County	2–0	Swansea City	Newport
15:00 BST	Abrahams 7', 45'	Report		Stadium: Rodney Parade; Attendance: 0 Referee: Kevin Johnson

== Statistics ==
=== Appearances and goals ===
As of match played 17 February 2021

No.	Pos	Nat	Player	Total		Championship		FA Cup		EFL Cup	
No.	Pos	Nat	Player	Apps	Goals	Apps	Goals	Apps	Goals	Apps	Goals
Goalkeepers
1	GK	(England) ENG	Freddie Woodman	31	0	27	0	3	0	1	0
13	GK	(Germany) GER	Steven Benda	1	0	1	0	0	0	0	0
Defenders
2	DF	(England) ENG	Ryan Bennett	18	0	17	0	1	0	0	0
3	DF	(Republic of Ireland) IRL	Ryan Manning	9	0	3+3	0	3	0	0	0
5	DF	(England) ENG	Marc Guéhi	27	0	25	0	2	0	0	0
22	DF	(England) ENG	Joel Latibeaudiere	5	0	1+2	0	2	0	0	0
23	DF	(Wales) WAL	Connor Roberts	30	3	28	3	2	0	0	0
24	DF	(England) ENG	Jake Bidwell	31	1	26+1	1	0+3	0	1	0
26	DF	(England) ENG	Kyle Naughton	18	0	16	0	1	0	1	0
34	DF	(Wales) WAL	Kieron Freeman	1	0	0	0	0+1	0	0	0
44	DF	(Wales) WAL	Ben Cabango	23	3	20+1	3	2	0	0	0
Midfielders
6	MF	(Scotland) SCO	Jay Fulton	27	2	18+5	2	2+1	0	1	0
7	MF	(England) ENG	Korey Smith	25	0	20+3	0	0+1	0	1	0
8	MF	(England) ENG	Matt Grimes	30	4	24+3	2	2	2	1	0
14	MF	(Republic of Ireland) IRL	Conor Hourihane	6	3	4	3	1+1	0	0	0
15	MF	(England) ENG	Wayne Routledge	9	1	0+6	0	2	1	1	0
17	MF	(England) ENG	Morgan Whittaker	1	1	0	0	0+1	1	0	0
19	MF	(United States) USA	Paul Arriola	2	0	0+1	0	0+1	0	0	0
21	MF	(England) ENG	Yan Dhanda	17	1	10+3	1	3	0	0+1	0
31	MF	(Wales) WAL	Oli Cooper	2	1	0	0	0+2	1	0	0
Forwards
9	FW	(Jamaica) JAM	Jamal Lowe	31	9	27+1	9	1+1	0	1	0
10	FW	(Ghana) GHA	André Ayew	28	9	26+1	9	0	0	1	0
11	FW	(United States) USA	Jordan Morris	4	0	0+3	0	1	0	0	0
20	FW	(Wales) WAL	Liam Cullen	10	2	3+5	0	1+1	2	0	0
Transferred to another club
4	DF	(Wales) WAL	Joe Rodon	5	0	4	0	0	0	1	0
16	FW	(Sweden) SWE	Joel Asoro	1	0	0	0	0	0	0+1	0
17	MF	(Sweden) SWE	Kristoffer Peterson	1	0	0	0	0	0	0+1	0
Returned to parent club
11	MF	(England) ENG	Morgan Gibbs-White	6	1	4+1	1	0	0	1	0
14	FW	(Sweden) SWE	Viktor Gyökeres	12	1	2+9	0	1	1	0	0
45	MF	(England) ENG	Kasey Palmer	12	1	2+10	1	0	0	0	0
Out on loan to another club
28	MF	(Scotland) SCO	George Byers	1	0	0	0	1	0	0	0
38	DF	(Wales) WAL	Cameron Evans	1	0	0	0	1	0	0	0
41	FW	(Jamaica) JAM	Jordon Garrick	5	0	0+3	0	1+1	0	0	0

=== Assists ===
As of match played 17 February 2021

Rank	Pos.	No.	Player	Championship	FA Cup	EFL Cup	Total
1	DF	24	(England) Jake Bidwell	7	0	0	7
2	DF	23	(Wales) Connor Roberts	5	0	0	5
3	MF	21	(England) Yan Dhanda	2	2	0	4
3	MF	7	(England) Korey Smith	4	0	0	4
3	DF	3	(Republic of Ireland) Ryan Manning	1	3	0	4
5	MF	8	(England) Matt Grimes	3	0	0	3
6	FW	10	(Ghana) André Ayew	2	0	0	2
7	MF	3	(Scotland) Jay Fulton	1	0	0	1
7	MF	11	(England) Morgan Gibbs-White	1	0	0	1
7	MF	15	(England) Wayne Routledge	0	1	0	1
7	FW	41	(Jamaica) Jordon Garrick	0	1	0	1
7	DF	44	(Wales) Ben Cabango	1	0	0	1

=== Disciplinary record ===
As of match played 10 February 2021

Rank	No.	Nat.	Po.	Name	Championship			Play-offs			FA Cup			League Cup			Total		
Rank	No.	Nat.	Po.	Name	Booked	(yellow card) (yellow-red card)	Sent off (straight red)	Booked	(yellow card) (yellow-red card)	Sent off (straight red)	Booked	(yellow card) (yellow-red card)	Sent off (straight red)	Booked	(yellow card) (yellow-red card)	Sent off (straight red)	Booked	(yellow card) (yellow-red card)	Sent off (straight red)
1	2	(England)	DF	Ryan Bennett	6	0	0	0	0	0	0	0	0	0	0	0	6	0	0
2	5	(England)	DF	Marc Guéhi	5	0	0	0	0	0	0	0	0	0	0	0	5	0	0
2	6	(Scotland)	MF	Jay Fulton	5	0	0	0	0	0	0	0	0	0	0	0	5	0	0
2	8	(England)	DF	Matt Grimes	5	0	0	0	0	0	0	0	0	0	0	0	5	0	0
2	10	(Ghana)	FW	André Ayew	5	0	0	0	0	0	0	0	0	0	0	0	5	0	0
2	23	(Wales)	DF	Connor Roberts	5	0	0	0	0	0	0	0	0	0	0	0	5	0	0
7	24	(England)	DF	Jake Bidwell	4	0	0	0	0	0	0	0	0	0	0	0	4	0	0
7	21	(England)	MF	Yan Dhanda	2	0	0	0	0	0	2	0	0	0	0	0	4	0	0
9	44	(Wales)	DF	Ben Cabango	2	0	0	0	0	0	1	0	0	0	0	0	3	0	0
10	1	(England)	GK	Freddie Woodman	2	0	0	0	0	0	0	0	0	0	0	0	2	0	0
10	7	(England)	MF	Korey Smith	2	0	0	0	0	0	0	0	0	0	0	0	2	0	0
10	9	(England)	FW	Jamal Lowe	1	0	0	0	0	0	0	0	0	1	0	0	2	0	0
10	26	(England)	DF	Kyle Naughton	1	1	0	0	0	0	0	0	0	0	0	0	1	1	0
14	14	(Republic of Ireland)	MF	Conor Hourihane	1	0	0	0	0	0	0	0	0	0	0	0	1	0	0
14	38	(England)	MF	Cameron Evans	0	0	0	0	0	0	1	0	0	0	0	0	1	0	0
14	45	(England)	MF	Kasey Palmer	1	0	0	0	0	0	0	0	0	0	0	0	1	0	0
Total					46	1	0	0	0	0	4	0	0	1	0	0	51	1	0
