= 2016–17 Premier League Cup =

Tournament details
- Country: England; Wales
- Teams: 37

Final positions
- Champions: Swansea City (1st Title)
- Runners-up: Reading (1st Runner Up Finish)

Tournament statistics
- Matches played: 116
- Goals scored: 351 (3.03 per match)
- Top goal scorer: (Wales) George Williams Fulham (7 Goals)

The 2016–17 Premier League Cup was the fourth edition of the competition, and the first since it was renamed from the U21 Premier League Cup following the age limit being increased to under-23.

== Participants ==
37 teams participated this year's competition. 12 fewer than last year. Brentford, Chelsea, Exeter City left after last years competition, while Bolton Wanderers, Crewe Alexandra, Doncaster Rovers, Gillingham, Leeds United, Millwall, Peterborough United, Plymouth Argyle, Preston North End, Queens Park Rangers, and Sheffield Wednesday did not return after 3 years in the competition. Only Manchester City returned after last year's absence. Only Portsmouth was the new team that joined the competition for the very first time.

=== Category 1 ===
- Blackburn Rovers
- Brighton & Hove Albion
- Derby County
- Everton
- Fulham
- Leicester City
- Liverpool
- Manchester City
- Middlesbrough
- Newcastle United
- Norwich City
- Reading
- Southampton
- Stoke City
- Sunderland
- Swansea City
- West Bromwich Albion
- West Ham United
- Wolverhampton Wanderers

=== Category 2 ===
- Barnsley
- Birmingham City
- Bristol City
- Cardiff City
- Charlton Athletic
- Colchester United
- Huddersfield Town
- Hull City
- Ipswich Town
- Nottingham Forest
- Sheffield United
- Watford

=== Category 3 ===
- AFC Bournemouth
- Burnley
- Portsmouth
- Southend United
- Wigan Athletic
- AFC Wimbledon

== Qualifying rounds ==
Two qualifying rounds were required to finalise the 32 teams that would enter the Group Stage. The First Qualifying Round consisted of the six EPPP Category 3 academy sides, with the three winners progressing to the next round.

In the Second Qualifying Round, the three winners were joined by Barnsley and Watford (the two teams who finished bottom of their respective Category 2 leagues in 2015/16). Of the five teams in the Second Qualifying Round draw, one received a bye straight to the Group Stage, with the two winners joining them.

=== First qualifying round ===
22 August 2016	Portsmouth	2–1	Southend United	Havant
19:00	Chaplin 15', 58'		Matsuzaka 69'	Stadium: West Leigh Park; Attendance: 272

22 August 2016	Burnley	3–2 (a.e.t.)	Bournemouth	Burnley
14:00	McNeil 27'; Chakwana 53'; Yao 108'		Surridge 12'; Ndjoli 29'	Stadium: Turf Moor

23 August 2016	AFC Wimbledon	5–0	Wigan Athletic	Kingston upon Thames
19:00	Poleon 15', 45'; Fitzpatrick 22', 65'; Antwi 80'			Stadium: Kingsmeadow Stadium

=== Second qualifying round ===
12 September 2016	Burnley	2–0	Watford	Burnley
14:00	Dunne 4'; Bamford 75' (pen.)	Report		Stadium: Turf Moor

12 September 2016	Portsmouth	2–0	Barnsley	Havant
19:00	Hunt 26'; Naismith	Report		Stadium: West Leigh Park; Referee: Dave Rutter

AFC Wimbledon	Bye

== Group stage ==
The draw for the group stage took place on 6 September 2016. Teams play each other twice, with the group winners and runners–up advance to the round of 16.

Results

=== Group A ===
Team	Pld	W	D	L	GF	GA	GD	Pts
Newcastle United	6	3	1	2	9	6	+3	10
Swansea City	6	3	1	2	7	6	+1	10
Southampton	6	3	0	3	7	5	+2	9
Bristol City	6	2	0	4	7	13	−6	6

30 September 2016	Newcastle United	0–0	Swansea City	Longbenton
				Stadium: Whitley Park

30 September 2016	Southampton	1–2	Bristol City	Marchwood
	O'Connor 90'	Report	McCoulsky 55', 86'	Stadium: Staplewood; Attendance: 0

4 November 2016	Swansea City	0–1	Southampton	Swansea
		Report	Johnson 6'	Stadium: Landore Training Centre; Attendance: 0 Referee: C.O'Donnell

7 November 2016	Bristol City	1–2	Newcastle United	Bath
	De Girolamo 85'	Report	Longstaff 19'; Charman 45'	Stadium: Twerton Park

2 December 2016	Southampton	3–0	Newcastle United	Marchwood
	Barnes 26', 45'; Olomola 78' (pen.)	Report		Stadium: Staplewood; Attendance: 0

20 January 2017	Swansea City	2–1	Newcastle United	Swansea
	Biabi 61'; Maric 66'	Report	Wilson 14'	Stadium: Landore Training Centre

13 February 2017	Newcastle United	4–0	Bristol City	Longbenton
	Vuckic 45', 60'; Fernandez 54'; Holmes 90'	Report		Stadium: Whitley Park; Attendance: 128

13 February 2017	Southampton	0–1	Swansea City	Marchwood
		Report	Jones 20' (o.g.)	Stadium: Staplewood; Attendance: 0

16 February 2017	Bristol City	0–2	Southampton	Bath
		Report	Seager 4'; Barnes 65'	Stadium: Twerton Park; Attendance: 0

23 February 2017	Swansea City	0–4	Bristol City	Swansea
			Edwards 11'; McNulty 73'; Hinds; Nurse	Stadium: Landore Training Centre

28 February 2017	Newcastle United	2–0	Southampton	Longbenton
	Charman 65', 85'	Report		Stadium: Whitley Park; Attendance: 130

9 March 2017	Bristol City	0–4	Swansea City	Bristol
		Report	McBurnie 32', 74' (pen.); Byers 52'; Garrick 90+4'	Stadium: Ashton Gate

=== Group B ===
Team	Pld	W	D	L	GF	GA	GD	Pts
Sunderland	6	3	2	1	9	7	+2	11
Blackburn Rovers	6	3	1	2	8	3	+5	10
Burnley	6	2	1	3	10	13	−3	7
Cardiff City	6	1	2	3	5	9	−4	5

30 September 2016	Cardiff City	1–1	Sunderland	Leckwith
	Bird 90+3'	Report	Asoro 76'	Stadium: Cardiff City Stadium

30 September 2016	Blackburn Rovers	2–0	Burnley	Blackburn
	Rankin-Costello 19'; Mansell 29'	Report		Stadium: Ewood Park; Attendance: 376; Referee: Anthony Backhouse

4 November 2016	Sunderland	1–0	Blackburn Rovers	Hetton-le-Hole
	Maja 27'	Report		Stadium: Eppleton Colliery Welfare Ground; Attendance: 220; Referee: A.Backhouse

8 November 2016	Burnley	3–1	Cardiff City	Burnley
	Bamford 15'; Barnes 21', 56'	Report	Southam 33'	Stadium: Turf Moor

5 December 2016	Cardiff City	0–0	Blackburn Rovers	Leckwith
				Stadium: Leckwith Sports Stadium

18 December 2016	Sunderland	1–1	Burnley	Hetton-le-Hole
	Honeyman 81'	Report	Dunne 43'	Stadium: Eppleton Colliery Welfare Ground; Attendance: 150

22 January 2017	Sunderland	2–0	Cardiff City	Hetton-le-Hole
	Greenwood 26'; Beadling 29'	Report		Stadium: Eppleton Colliery Welfare Ground; Attendance: 150

23 January 2017	Burnley	0–4	Blackburn Rovers	Morecambe
		Report	Stokes 47', 73'; Platt 56', 78'	Stadium: Globe Arena; Referee: K.Evans

13 February 2017	Cardiff City	2–1	Burnley	Leckwith
	Veale 67' (pen.); Waite 77'	Report	Wood 6'	Stadium: Cardiff City Stadium

27 February 2017	Burnley	5–3	Sunderland	Stockport
	Agyei 22', 37'; Dunne 45'; Birch 50'; Trialist 67'	Report	Greenwood 30'; Maja 32', 84' (pen.)	Stadium: Edgeley Park

27 February 2017	Blackburn Rovers	2–1	Cardiff City	Leyland
	Rankin Costello 25', 35'	Report	Abbruzzese 90'	Stadium: Lancashire FA; Attendance: 177

2 March 2017	Blackburn Rovers	0–1	Sunderland	Blackburn
		Report	Maja 24'	Stadium: BRFC Academy

=== Group C ===
Team	Pld	W	D	L	GF	GA	GD	Pts
Hull City	6	3	1	2	10	7	+3	10
Colchester United	6	3	1	2	8	9	−1	10
Manchester City	6	2	1	3	13	10	+3	7
Derby County	6	2	1	3	9	14	−5	7

2 October 2016	Hull City	0–1	Colchester United	North Ferriby
		Report	Issa 36'	Stadium: Grange Lane

4 November 2016	Derby County	0–1	Hull City	Derby
		Report	McKenzie 25'	Stadium: Pride Park

2 December 2016	Manchester City	1–2	Hull City	Manchester
	Ambrose 41'	Report	Edwards 49'; Rodgers 71'	Stadium: Academy Stadium; Referee: S.Oldham

5 December 2016	Colchester United	2–2	Derby County	Colchester
	Sembie-Ferris 40'; James 55'	Report	Vernam 3', 36'	Stadium: Colchester Community Stadium

12 December 2016	Derby County	1–5	Manchester City	Derby
	Vernam 81'	Report	Hardy 26'; Buckley-Ricketts 36', 46', 59'; Diaz 57'	Stadium: Pride Park

19 January 2017	Colchester United	2–1	Manchester City	Colchester
	Briggs 11'; Peter 18'	Report	Fernandes 31'	Stadium: Colchester Community Stadium; Attendance: 972

25 January 2017	Manchester City	1–3	Derby County	Barton-upon-Irwell
	Hardy 24'	Report	Gordon 55'; Jakobsen 73'; Bennett 84' (pen.)	Stadium: AJ Bell Stadium

12 February 2017	Manchester City	3–0	Colchester United	Manchester
	Ocran 8' (o.g.); Duhaney 40'; Buckley-Ricketts 60'	Report		Stadium: Academy Stadium

13 February 2017	Hull City	4–1	Derby County	North Ferriby
	Bowen 44', 50', 75'; Olley 90'	Report	Jakobsen 21'	Stadium: Grange Lane; Referee: T.Bramall

27 February 2017	Derby County	2–1	Colchester United	Burton-upon-Trent
	MacDonald 2'; Bateman 38'	Report	McKeown	Stadium: St George's Park

27 February 2017	Hull City	2–2	Manchester City	North Ferriby
	Ter Horst 34', 72'	Report	Nmecha 4'; Baodu 22'	Stadium: Grange Lane

2 March 2017	Colchester United	2–1	Hull City	Colchester
	Akinwande 23'; Pollard 61'	Report	Hinchliffe 21'	Stadium: Colchester Community Stadium; Referee: Mr D.Treleaven

=== Group D ===
Team	Pld	W	D	L	GF	GA	GD	Pts
Portsmouth	6	3	2	1	11	6	+5	11
Norwich City	6	3	1	2	13	9	+4	10
Everton	6	2	1	3	7	9	−2	7
Wolverhampton Wanderers	6	1	2	3	7	14	−7	5

29 September 2016	Norwich City	0–0	Portsmouth	Norwich
				Stadium: Carrow Road

1 October 2016	Everton	1–0	Wolverhampton Wanderers	Walton
	Kenny 90'	Report		Stadium: Goodison Park

4 November 2016	Everton	1–4	Norwich City	Walton
	Dyson 86'	Report	McIntosh 43'; Jaiyesimi 63'; Middleton 65'; Cantwell 86'	Stadium: Goodison Park

14 November 2016	Portsmouth	0–0	Wolverhampton Wanderers	Havant
		Report		Stadium: Westleigh Park; Attendance: 250; Referee: Adrian Quelch

2 December 2016	Wolverhampton Wanderers	4–3	Norwich City	Wellington, Shropshire
	Gladon 7', 9', 49' (pen.); John 47'	Report	Jaiyesimi 55', 65'; McIntosh 90'	Stadium: New Bucks Head

5 December 2016	Everton	3–1	Portsmouth	Southport
	Calvert-Lewin 15'; Davies 56' (o.g.); Dyson 60'	Report	Bradbury 66'	Stadium: Haig Avenue; Referee: J.Johnson

23 January 2017	Wolverhampton Wanderers	1–1	Everton	Wellington, Shropshire
	Randall 36'	Report	Walsh 85' (pen.)	Stadium: New Bucks Head

23 January 2017	Portsmouth	4–0	Norwich City	Havant
	Kabamba 14'; Lowe 37', 38', 76'	Report		Stadium: Westleigh Park; Attendance: 281; Referee: Sam Allison

7 February 2017	Wolverhampton Wanderers	2–4	Portsmouth	Wellington, Shropshire
	Ronan 10'; Wilson 76'	Report 1 Report 2	Kabamba 14'; Naismith 30'; Johnson 50' (o.g.); Smith 87'	Stadium: New Bucks Head; Attendance: 149; Referee: Simon Barrow

15 February 2017	Norwich City	1–0	Everton	Norwich
	Adams 82'			Stadium: Carrow Road; Attendance: 1,147

24 February 2017	Norwich City	5–0	Wolverhampton Wanderers	Norwich
	Cantwell 44', 50', 73'; Adams 48'; Jaiyesimi 58'			Stadium: Colney Training Ground

27 February 2017	Portsmouth	2–1	Everton	Havant
	Close 46'; Kabamba 77'	Report	Sambou 29'	Stadium: Westleigh Park; Attendance: 378; Referee: Carl Brook

=== Group E ===
Team	Pld	W	D	L	GF	GA	GD	Pts
Brighton & Hove Albion	6	5	0	1	17	3	+14	15
West Ham United	6	3	1	2	10	9	+1	10
Nottingham Forest	6	1	2	3	6	16	−10	5
Leicester City	6	0	3	3	5	10	−5	3

1 October 2016	Leicester City	0–2	West Ham United	Loughborough
			Browne 56'; Quina 69'	Stadium: Loughborough University Stadium; Referee: Anthony Serrano

1 October 2016	Brighton & Hove Albion	7–0	Nottingham Forest	Lancing
	Hutchinson 20'; Starkey 29'; Tilley 39', 45', 66'; Ayunga 68'; Tighe 73'			Stadium: Elite Performance Centre

4 November 2016	Nottingham Forest	1–2	West Ham United	Alfreton
	Brereton 35'		Hector–Ingram 43'; Browne 86'	Stadium: North Street

1 December 2016	West Ham United	1–3	Brighton & Hove Albion	Dagenham
	Parfitt–Williams 65'		Molumby 40'; Starkey 78'; Ward 90'	Stadium: Victoria Road

16 December 2016	Leicester City	2–2	Nottingham Forest	Loughborough
	Schlupp 22'; Uche 70'		Nielsen 23'; Brereton 31'	Stadium: Loughborough University Football Stadium

4 January 2017	Leicester City	0–1	Brighton & Hove Albion	Burton-upon-Trent
			Tighe 64'	Stadium: St George's Park National Football Centre; Referee: Wayne Barrett

23 January 2017	Nottingham Forest	2–1	Brighton & Hove Albion	Alfreton
	Thorne 5'; Dumitru-Cardoso 90'		Cox 82'	Stadium: North Street; Attendance: 121

9 February 2017	West Ham United	2–2	Leicester City	Dagenham
	Rice 11'; Holland 86'		Muskwe 11', 45'	Stadium: Chigwell Construction Stadium

13 February 2017	West Ham United	3–0	Nottingham Forest	Dagenham
	Powell 34', 40'; Holland 89'			Stadium: Victoria Road

13 February 2017	Brighton & Hove Albion	2–0	Leicester City	Lancing
	Bjørdal 16' Tilley 85'			Stadium: Elite Performance Centre

24 February 2017	Nottingham Forest	1–1	Leicester City	Alfreton
	Gomis 3'	Report	Pascanu 89'	Stadium: North Street

27 February 2017	Brighton & Hove Albion	3–0	West Ham United	Lancing
	Bjørdal 17' Tilley 41' Connolly 50'			Stadium: Elite Performance Centre

=== Group F ===
Team	Pld	W	D	L	GF	GA	GD	Pts
Fulham	6	5	0	1	14	7	+7	15
Middlesbrough	6	3	0	3	7	10	−3	9
Charlton Athletic	6	2	2	2	13	11	+2	8
AFC Wimbledon	6	0	2	4	3	9	−6	2

30 September 2016	Fulham	3–1	Middlesbrough	New Malden
16:00	Kait 15', 37'; Humphrys 33'	Report	De Pena 71' (pen.)	Stadium: Motspur Park; Attendance: 127; Referee: C.O'Donnell

3 October 2016	Charlton Athletic	3–3	AFC Wimbledon	Greenwich
	Umerah 11'; Teixeira 19', 41'	Report	Owens 45'; Hines 65' (pen.); Olusanya 71' (pen.)	Stadium: Badgers Park

11 November 2016	Middlesbrough	1–0	Charlton Athletic	York
	Morris 84'	Report		Stadium: Bootham Crescent; Referee: A.Miller

5 December 2016	AFC Wimbledon	0–1	Middlesbrough	Merstham
		Report	Mondal 1'	Stadium: Moatside Stadium

5 December 2016	Charlton Athletic	3–1	Fulham	Dartford
	Umerah 33' (pen.), 48'; Aribo 38'	Report	Woodrow 71'	Stadium: Princes Park

23 January 2017	Middlesbrough	1–2	Fulham	Hartlepool
	Jakupovic 84' (pen.)	Report	Thorsteinsson 42'; Williams 76' (pen.)	Stadium: Victoria Park; Referee: M.Coy

13 February 2017	Charlton Athletic	5–2	Middlesbrough	Dartford
	Dijksteel 28'; Kennedy 39', 54'; Hackett-Fairchild 48', 49'	Report	Fewster 1'; Mitov 75' (o.g.)	Stadium: Princes Park

13 February 2017	Fulham	2–0	AFC Wimbledon	New Malden
	Williams 3', 28'	Report		Stadium: Motspur Park; Attendance: 190

24 February 2017	Fulham	4–2	Charlton Athletic	New Malden
	O'Riley 43'; Williams 44', 67'; Adebayo 79'	Report	Hackett-Fairchild 35'; Ahearne-Grant 73'	Stadium: Motspur Park

27 February 2017	Middlesbrough	1–0	AFC Wimbledon	Bishop Auckland
	Pattison 24'	Report		Stadium: Heritage Park; Referee: S.Oldham

2 March 2017	AFC Wimbledon	0–2	Fulham	Stoke d'Abernon
		Report	Adebayo 35'; Williams 79'	Stadium: Cobham Training Centre

12 March 2017	AFC Wimbledon	0–0	Charlton Athletic	Merstham
				Stadium: Moatside Stadium

=== Group G ===
Team	Pld	W	D	L	GF	GA	GD	Pts
Liverpool	6	5	1	0	17	3	+14	16
Huddersfield Town	6	2	1	3	6	11	−5	7
West Bromwich Albion	6	1	2	3	3	5	−2	5
Ipswich Town	6	1	2	3	3	10	−7	5

2 October 2016	Ipswich Town	0–3	Liverpool	Ipswich
		Report	Ings 4', 76', 89'	Stadium: Portman Road; Attendance: 1,330

7 October 2016	Huddersfield Town	0–1	West Bromwich Albion	Ashton-under-Lyne
		Report	Wilson 22'	Stadium: Tameside Stadium

4 November 2016	Ipswich Town	2–1	West Bromwich Albion	Ipswich
	McDonnell 22'; Dozzell 24'	Report	Scrivens 43'	Stadium: Portman Road

5 November 2016	Liverpool	3–0	Huddersfield Town	Birkenhead
	Lennon 26'; Wilson 79' (pen.); Brannagan 90'	Report		Stadium: Prenton Park

5 December 2016	Liverpool	1–1	West Bromwich Albion	Birkenhead
	Brannagan 74'	Report	Wright 25'	Stadium: Prenton Park; Referee: Martin Coy

5 December 2016	Ipswich Town	0–2	Huddersfield Town	Ipswich
		Report	Boyle 45'; O'Brien 89'	Stadium: Portman Road

22 January 2017	Liverpool	3–0	Ipswich Town	Birkenhead
	Alves 19'; Brewster 29'; Woodburn 82'	Report		Stadium: Prenton Park; Referee: Anthony Backhouse

24 January 2017	West Bromwich Albion	0–1	Huddersfield Town	Kidderminster
		Report	Warde 1'	Stadium: Aggborough

12 February 2017	Huddersfield Town	2–6	Liverpool	Ashton-Under-Lyne
	Dyson 54', 73'	Report	Woodburn 11', 90+2'; Virtue 22'; Wilson 44', 52'; Ojo 45+1'	Stadium: Tameside Stadium

13 February 2017	West Bromwich Albion	0–0	Ipswich Town	West Bromwich
				Stadium: The Hawthorns

26 February 2017	Huddersfield Town	1–1	Ipswich Town	Ashton-under-Lyne
	Boyle 90'	Report	Dozzell 68'	Stadium: Tameside Stadium

28 February 2017	West Bromwich Albion	0–1	Liverpool	Kidderminster
		Report	Randall 90+1'	Stadium: Aggborough; Referee: Robert Whitton

=== Group H ===
Team	Pld	W	D	L	GF	GA	GD	Pts
Reading	6	4	1	1	16	9	+7	13
Sheffield United	6	2	2	2	12	13	−1	8
Birmingham City	6	2	1	3	7	12	−5	7
Stoke City	6	1	2	3	8	9	−1	5

1 October 2016	Birmingham City	1–3	Reading	Solihull
11:00	O'Keeffe 8'	Report	Rinomhota 2'; McIntyre 21'; Frost 83'	Stadium: Damson Park

1 October 2016	Stoke City	4–0	Sheffield United	Leek
	Verlinden 22'; Telford 61'; Ngoy 65', 78'	Report		Stadium: Harrison Park

5 November 2016	Birmingham City	2–1	Stoke City	Nuneaton
	Popa 30'; O'Keeffe 49'	Report	Abdallah 33'	Stadium: Liberty Stadium

2 December 2016	Reading	1–0	Stoke City	Reading
	Smith 59'	Report		Stadium: Madejski Stadium

17 December 2016	Sheffield United	3–3	Reading	Sheffield
	Gilmour 18'; Hallam 28' (pen.); Wright 82'	Report	Smith; Balogun; Barrett	Stadium: Brammall Lane; Attendance: 90

23 January 2017	Reading	4–1	Birmingham City	High Wycombe
	Novakovich 8', 75'; Frost 45'; Smith 90+3'	Report	Brown 25'	Stadium: Adams Park

25 January 2017	Sheffield United	2–2	Stoke City	Sheffield
	Smith 4'; Hallam 19'	Report	Waring 10', 83'	Stadium: Brammall Lane

10 January 2017	Stoke City	0–0	Birmingham City	Leek
				Stadium: Harrison Park

23 January 2017	Reading	1–3	Sheffield United	High Wycombe
	Frost 65'	Report	Wright 6' (pen.), 42'; Mallon 7'	Stadium: Adams Park; Referee: Mr. A Coggins

20 February 2017	Birmingham City	1–3	Sheffield United	Solihull
	Storer 43'	Report	McNulty 21'; Slater 35'; Wright 45+3'	Stadium: Damson Park

27 February 2017	Sheffield United	1–2	Birmingham City	Sheffield
	Mallon 22'	Report	Kelly 8' (o.g.); Seddon 43'	Stadium: Brammall Lane; Attendance: 130

2 March 2017	Stoke City	1–4	Reading	Stoke-on-Trent
	Devlin 90'	Report	Novakovich 29', 40'; Barrett 59', 77'	Stadium: Clayton Wood Training Ground

== Knockout stages ==
=== Round of 16 ===
17 March 2017	Norwich City	5–5 (a.e.t.) (3–2 p)	Fulham	Norwich
14:30	McIntosh 21', 39', 43'; Adams 95'; Spyrou 117'	Report	Edun 7'; Thorsteinsson 19'; Kait 69'; Walker 94'; Williams 112' (pen.)	Stadium: Colney Training Centre
	Penalties
	Crowe (penalty scored); Ramsay (penalty missed); McGrandles (penalty scored); McIntosh (penalty scored)		(penalty scored) Williams; (penalty missed) Walker; (penalty scored) Smile; (penalty missed) Adebayo; (penalty missed) Nabay

17 March 2017	Sunderland	0–1	Colchester United	Hetton-le-Hole
19:00		Report	McKeown 9'	Stadium: Eppleton Colliery Welfare Ground; Attendance: 170

18 March 2017	Brighton & Hove Albion	3–1	Huddersfield Town	Lancing
13:00	Hutchinson 17'; Davies 24'; Collar 86'		Warde 86'	Stadium: Amex Elite Performance Centre

18 March 2017	Newcastle United	3–2 (a.e.t.)	West Ham United	Newcastle-upon-Tyne
13:00	Charman 62'; Ameobi 82', 98'	Report	Fletcher 7'; Rice 72'	Stadium: St James' Park; Attendance: 878; Referee: Mr M.Coy

18 March 2017	Swansea City	2–0	Blackburn Rovers	Landore
13:00	Blair 9'; James 45+1'	Report		Stadium: Landore Training Centre

19 March 2017	Hull City	2–2 (a.e.t.) (4–5 p)	Liverpool	Bishop Burton
15:00	Hinchliffe 19'; Lofts 100'	Report	Virtue 52'; Gomes 95'	Referee: Scott Oldham
	Penalties
	Annan (penalty missed); McKenzie (penalty scored); Lofts (penalty scored); Hinchliffe (penalty scored); Hamilton (penalty scored); Maslen-Jones (penalty missed)		(penalty scored) Stewart; (penalty scored) Gomes; (penalty scored) Gomes; (penalty scored) Gomez; (penalty missed) Ojo; (penalty scored) Phillips

20 March 2017	Reading	4–1	Middlesbrough	High Wycombe
13:00	Mendes 36', 64'; Osho 46'; Meite 87'		Fewster 10'	Stadium: Adams Park; Referee: C.Hicks

20 March 2017	Portsmouth	1–0	Sheffield United	Havant
19:00	Kabamba 80'	Report		Stadium: Westleigh Park; Attendance: 380; Referee: Anthony Coggins

=== Quarter–final ===
3 April 2017	Newcastle United	0–1	Reading	Little Benton
13:00		Report	Novakovich 72' (pen.)	Stadium: Little Benton; Attendance: 223

3 April 2017	Swansea City	1–0	Brighton & Hove Albion	Landore
14:00	Gorre 68'			Stadium: Landore Training Centre

3 April 2017	Liverpool	0–1	Norwich City	Chester
19:00		Report	Adams 10'	Stadium: Lookers Vauxhall Stadium; Referee: Peter Wright

3 April 2017	Portsmouth	2–0	Colchester United	Havant
19:00	Kabamba 52'; Lowe 84'	Report		Stadium: Westleigh Park; Attendance: 598; Referee: David Rock

=== Semi–final ===
30 April 2017	Reading	4–1	Norwich City	Reading
13:00 BST	Dickie 29'; Smith 37', 88'; Frost 43'		Grant 48'	Stadium: Madejski Stadium

2 May 2017	Swansea City	3–0 (a.e.t.)	Portsmouth	Landore
19:00 BST	McBurnie 94', 117' (pen.); Byers 101'	Report		Stadium: Landore Training Centre; Referee: Carl Brook

=== Final ===
Swansea City	2–0	Reading
King 44', 81'	Report

Liberty Stadium, Swansea
Attendance: 2,113

Note: Flags indicate national team as defined under FIFA eligibility rules; some limited exceptions apply. Players may hold more than one non-FIFA nationality.

Swansea City
No.	Pos.	Nation	Player
1	GK	SLO	Gregor Zabret
2	DF	ENG	Tyler Reid
3	DF	WAL	Connor Roberts
4	MF	SWE	Adnan Marić
5	DF	WAL	Keston Davies
6	DF	WAL	Joe Rodon
7	MF	WAL	Daniel James
8	MF	SCO	Jay Fulton
9	FW	SCO	Oli McBurnie
10	MF	SCO	George Byers
11	FW	SCO	Adam King
Substitutes:
12	DF	WAL	Aaron Lewis
13	GK	WAL	Lewis Thomas
14	FW	SCO	Botti Biabi
15	FW	JAM	Jordon Garrick
16	MF	WAL	Jack Evans
Coach: (Wales) Cameron Toshack

Reading
No.	Pos.	Nation	Player
1	GK	ENG	George Legg
2	DF	ENG	Tennai Watson
3	DF	ENG	Rob Dickie
4	DF	NGR	Gabriel Osho
5	DF	ENG	Omar Richards
6	MF	ENG	Ryan East
7	MF	IRL	Josh Barrett
8	MF	ZIM	Andy Rinomhota
9	FW	USA	Andrija Novakovich
10	MF	ENG	Tyler Frost
11	FW	CIV	Yakou Méïté
Substitutes:
12	GK	FIN	Axel Anderson
13	GK	AUS	Liam Driscoll
14	MF	SCO	Jordan Holsgrove
15	FW	ENG	Sam Smith
16	DF	SCO	Jake Sheppard
Coach: (England) Martin Kuhl

== See also ==
- 2016–17 Professional U23 Development League
- 2016–17 FA Youth Cup
