= Jordon Garrick =

Jamaican footballer (born 1998)

Personal information
- Full name: Jordon D'Andre Garrick
- Date of birth: 15 July 1998 (age 28)
- Place of birth: Jamaica
- Height: 6 ft 0 in (1.83 m)
- Position: Winger

Youth career
- –2015: Ossett Albion
- 2015–2019: Swansea City

Senior career*
Years	Team	Apps	(Gls)
2019–2023	Swansea City	14	(2)
2021	→ Swindon Town (loan)	19	(2)
2021–2022	→ Plymouth Argyle (loan)	42	(4)
2022	→ Lincoln City (loan)	11	(0)
2023–2024	Forest Green Rovers	29	(7)
2024	Oldham Athletic	0	(0)
2024–2025	Forest Green Rovers	20	(4)
2025	St Patrick's Athletic	7	(0)
2026	Merthyr Town	12	(2)
- * Club domestic league appearances and goals as of 09:28, 21 August 2026 (UTC)

Jordon D'Andre Garrick (born 15 July 1998) is a Jamaican professional footballer who plays as a winger.

Born in Jamaica, he moved to England as a child where he began playing football and eventually joined Ossett Albion. In November 2015, he joined Swansea City and made his professional debut four years later.

== Early life ==
Garrick was born in Jamaica before his family settled in the village of Liversedge in Yorkshire, England. He attended Whitcliffe Mount School in Cleckheaton before studying sport and exercise science at Huddersfield New College.

As a teenager, Garrick played football before taking up rugby league at the age of 16. He began playing rugby league for local amateur side Dudley Hill where the coach had ties to Bradford Bulls. He began training with the Bulls, playing as either a fullback or winger. Garrick came close to giving up football after the Bulls expressed an interest in signing him before being persuaded to keep playing by his mother and the manager of his amateur side.

== Career ==
=== Swansea City ===
Garrick played for Northern Premier Division One side Ossett Albion before being encouraged by his coaches to attend a trial with Premier League side Swansea City. The two-week trial proved successful and he signed a two-year deal with the Welsh side, only a year since contemplating leaving football to pursue a rugby league career. He was initially assigned to the club's academy and under-21 development side where he scored eight goals in ten matches during his first season with the under-18s. He made his professional debut for the club as a substitute in place of Barrie McKay during a 3–1 victory over Northampton Town in the first round of the EFL Cup on 13 August 2019. He made his Football League debut a week later during a 3–1 victory over Queens Park Rangers, winning the penalty for his side's second goal. Garrick described his debut as emotional and stated "I had a few tears in my eyes to be honest. It was emotional because it's been a long time coming". He scored his first goal for Swansea in an EFL Cup tie against Cambridge United on 28 August 2019. On 9 January 2021, he assisted Viktor Gyökeres' first goal for Swansea, in a 2–0 win away to Stevenage in the FA Cup. On 1 February 2021, Garrick joined League One side Swindon Town on loan for the remainder of the 2020–21 season. On 11 August 2022, he would join Lincoln City on a season-long loan deal. He would make his Lincoln City debut on 13 August, coming off the bench against Forest Green Rovers. He was recalled by Swansea City on 5 January 2023 having played 16 times in all competitions for Lincoln City.

=== Forest Green Rovers ===
On the same day he joined Forest Green Rovers for an undisclosed fee signing an 18-month deal. He was released following the second of back-to-back relegations at the end of the 2023–24 season.

=== Oldham Athletic ===
In October 2024, following a successful trial period, Garrick joined National League side Oldham Athletic on a non-contract basis.

=== Return to Forest Green Rovers ===
On 20 December 2024, Garrick returned to National League side Forest Green Rovers on a short-term deal. Garrick departed the club upon the expiration of his contract at the end of the 2024–25 season.

=== St Patrick's Athletic ===
On 6 August 2025, he signed for League of Ireland Premier Division club St Patrick's Athletic until the end of their season in November. He made his debut for the club on 10 August 2025, replacing Simon Power from the bench in the 72nd minute of a 3–0 win over Sligo Rovers at Richmond Park. On 14 September 2025, Garrick scored his first goal for the club, coming off the bench to score his side's third goal in a 3–1 win at home to Galway United in the FAI Cup Quarter Final. He was released at the end of his contract in November 2025, having scored 1 goal in 12 appearances for the club in all competitions.

=== Merthyr Town ===
On 2 February 2026, Garrick signed for National League North side Merthyr Town. He scored 2 goals in 12 appearances by the end of the 2025–26 season for his new club, as they missed out on the playoffs on the final day of the season.

== Style of play ==
Garrick has described himself as a player with "pace and skill" and has credited his rugby league background with improving his physicality which he stated "gave me an edge over some players who were older than me in non-league."

== Personal life ==
His younger brother Donnell Garrick is also a footballer, and played in the academy at Huddersfield Town.

== Career statistics ==
As of match played on 25 April 2026

Appearances and goals by club, season and competition
Club	Season	League			National Cup (Note: Includes FA Cup & FAI Cup)		League Cup (Note: Includes EFL Cup & National League Cup)		Other		Total	
Club	Season	Division	Apps	Goals	Apps	Goals	Apps	Goals	Apps	Goals	Apps	Goals
Swansea City U23	2016–17	—							2 (Note: Appearances in the EFL Trophy)	0	2	0
Swansea City U23	2017–18	—							3	1	3	1
Swansea City U23	2018–19	—							3	1	3	1
Swansea City U23	Total		—						8	2	8	2
Swansea City	2019–20	Championship	11	2	0	0	3	1	0	0	14	3
Swansea City	2020–21	Championship	3	0	2	0	0	0	—		5	0
Swansea City	2021–22	Championship	0	0	0	0	0	0	—		0	0
Swansea City	2022–23	Championship	0	0	0	0	0	0	—		0	0
Swansea City	Total		14	2	2	0	3	1	0	0	19	3
Swindon Town (loan)	2020–21	League One	19	2	—		—		—		19	2
Plymouth Argyle (loan)	2021–22	League One	42	4	5	3	0	0	3	0	50	7
Lincoln City (loan)	2022–23	League One	11	0	0	0	2	1	3	0	16	1
Forest Green Rovers	2022–23	League One	21	5	1	0	—		0	0	22	5
Forest Green Rovers	2023–24	League Two	8	2	0	0	—		0	0	8	2
Forest Green Rovers	Total		29	7	1	0	0	0	0	0	30	7
Oldham Athletic	2024–25	National League	0	0	0	0	1	0	—		1	0
Forest Green Rovers	2024–25	National League	20	4	0	0	—		1 (Note: Appearance in the National League play-offs)	0	21	4
St Patrick's Athletic	2025	LOI Premier Division	7	0	2	1	—		3 (Note: Appearances in the Leinster Senior Cup)	0	12	1
Merthyr Town	2025–26	National League North	12	2	—		—		—		12	2
Career total			154	21	10	4	6	2	18	2	188	29

== Honours ==
Swansea City U23

- Premier League Cup: 2016–17
