= Kyle Naughton =

English footballer (born 1988)

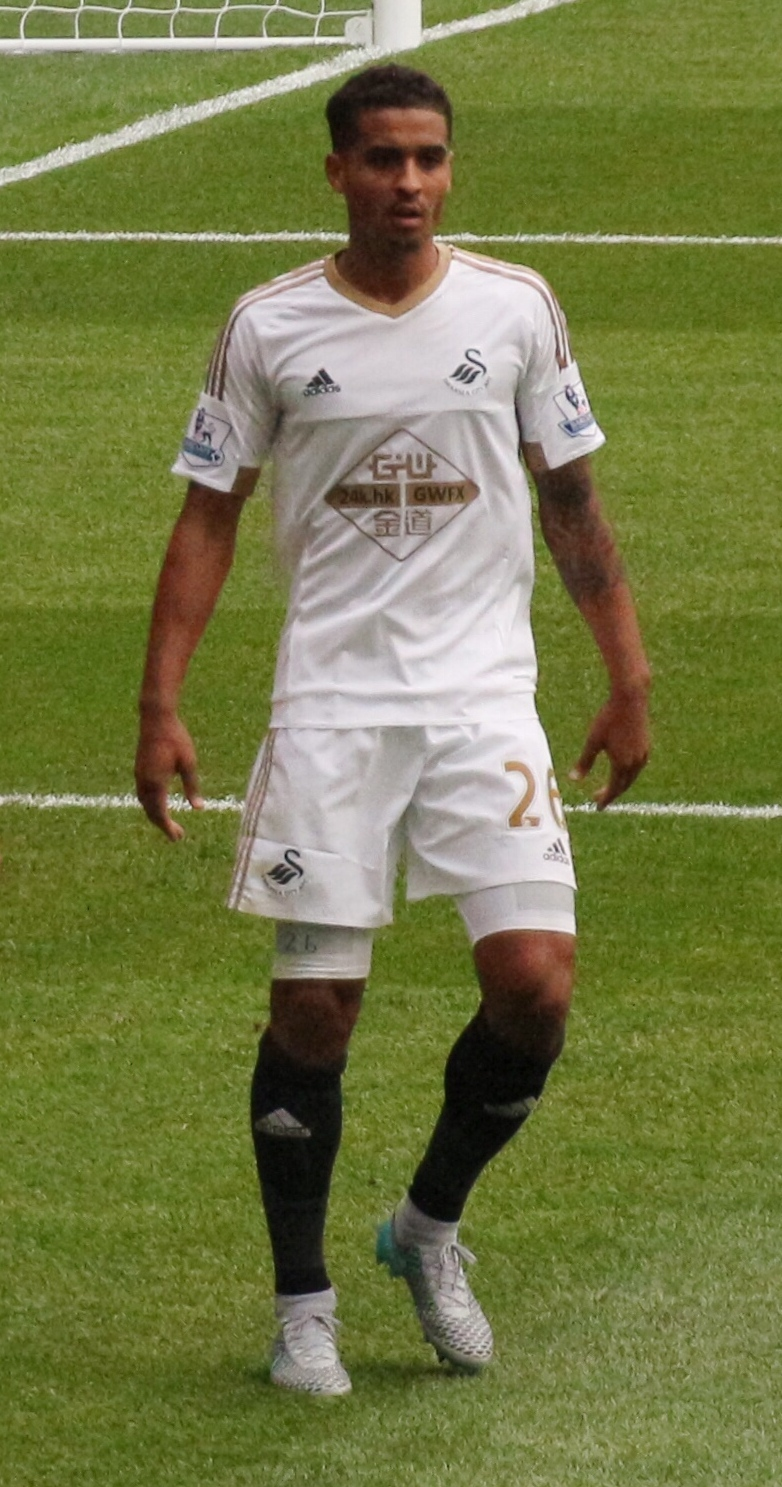
- Naughton playing for Swansea City in 2015

Personal information
- Full name: Kyle Naughton
- Date of birth: 17 November 1988 (age 37)
- Place of birth: Sheffield, England
- Height: 5 ft 11 in (1.80 m)
- Position: Right back

Youth career
- 1996–2008: Sheffield United

Senior career*
Years	Team	Apps	(Gls)
2008–2009	Sheffield United	40	(1)
2008	→ Gretna (loan)	18	(0)
2009–2015	Tottenham Hotspur	42	(0)
2010	→ Middlesbrough (loan)	15	(0)
2010–2011	→ Leicester City (loan)	34	(5)
2011–2012	→ Norwich City (loan)	32	(0)
2015–2025	Swansea City	300	(5)
Total		458	(11)

International career
2008–2010	England U21	9	(0)
- * Club domestic league appearances and goals as of 17:10, 3 May 2025 (UTC)

Kyle Naughton (born 17 November 1988) is an English professional footballer who last played as a right back for EFL Championship club Swansea City.

Naughton was a product of Sheffield United's academy before breaking into their first team in 2008, transferring to Tottenham Hotspur the following year. He has represented England at under-21 level as well as having loan spells with Gretna, Middlesbrough, Leicester City and Norwich City. He spent the next 10 years with Swansea City.

== Club career ==
=== Sheffield United ===
Naughton was born in Sheffield, South Yorkshire. He was a product of Sheffield United's centre of excellence and academy, having trained with the club the age of seven. He attended an England under-15 training camp during the 2004–05 season, and over the years has become a regular in the academy and reserve teams. He captained his club's academy team to the quarter-finals of the FA Youth Cup in the 2006–07 season.

He was signed by Scottish Premier League team Gretna on loan in January 2008, and made his league debut for Gretna against Rangers on 16 January 2008. He played regularly for the rest of the season at the troubled Scottish club who were placed into administration during his tenure there. Despite this Naughton continued for Gretna as the Blades agreed to cover insurance payments needed to allow him to play. Naughton played 19 times for the club but was unable to help them avoid relegation. Naughton made his first team debut for the Blades the following season, coming on as a second-half substitute in the first round of the League Cup against Port Vale in August 2008. In his second substitute appearance for the club he netted the winning goal in a 2–1 League Cup success over Yorkshire rivals Huddersfield Town.

Naughton made his league debut on 20 September 2008 against Norwich City, he then went on to make his first start for Sheffield United in their 2–1 victory over Watford on 27 September 2008, gaining the man of the match award. From that point he cemented his place in the starting eleven and was virtually ever present for the rest of the season, becoming first choice at right back whilst also making a couple of appearances in midfield and finishing the season playing at left back to cover for the injured Gary Naysmith. His successful season was rewarded when he was voted Young Player of the Year by the United supporters club, was runner up to Matthew Kilgallon in the senior Player of the Year award and was included in the Championship PFA Team of the Year.

=== Tottenham Hotspur ===
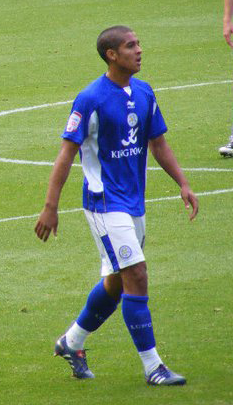
Naughton playing for Leicester City in 2011

Despite major interest from Everton, Naughton signed for Tottenham Hotspur in July 2009 along with fellow Sheffield United player Kyle Walker for a combined fee of £9 million. He made his Spurs non-competitive debut against Barcelona in the 2009 Wembley Cup which ended in a 1–1 draw. He came on as a substitute in the 94th minute in the match against West Ham United, which was the club's third match in the 2009–10 season to mark his debut in the Premier League. Naughton then signed a six-month loan deal with Middlesbrough on 1 February 2010. He made his debut in the 1–1 draw against Ipswich Town.

After returning to Tottenham he was loaned out again initially until January to another Championship club, Leicester City. He made his debut on 16 October in a 1–1 draw against Hull City. In his second match for Leicester City, against Leeds United, he scored the second league goal of his career. He scored again for Leicester City in the 5–1 win against Doncaster Rovers. He also scored against Barnsley in a 4–1 win on 5 February with a 30-yard drive into the top corner. Naughton also scored a 25-yard rocket to equalise for Leicester in the M69 derby against Coventry. On 12 March, Naughton scored Leicester's 3rd goal in their 3–0 win over Scunthorpe. Leicester extended Naughton's loan until the end of the 2010–11 season on 8 January after a permanent move failed to materialise. In April, Naughton was named as right back in the Championship PFA Team of the Year for the second time in three years and won the Leicester City Young Player of the Year award.

On 21 July 2011, Naughton signed a season-long loan deal to Premier League team Norwich City from Tottenham Hotspur. He was handed squad number 25 for his year in Norfolk. Naughton was an unused substitute for the Canaries opening Premier League fixture against Wigan Athletic on 13 August 2011. Naughton displaced Russell Martin as the first-choice right back, and started the matches against Stoke, Chelsea and West Brom. In all, he made twenty-three appearances over the course of the season at either right back or centre back.

Naughton made his first full league start for Tottenham on 16 September 2012 away to Reading, a match in which Tottenham won 3–1.

=== Swansea City ===
Naughton joined Swansea City on 22 January 2015 for a reported £5 million. Naughton quickly established himself as first choice right back for Swansea, before being ruled out for the remainder of the 2014–15 Premier League season with ankle ligament damage in a 3–1 victory over Hull City.

Naughton was shown a red card in the 31st minute of his side's 4–2 defeat to Sunderland in a decision which was criticised by interim manager Alan Curtis. The red card was overturned upon appeal. Naughton continued to rotate in the right back position with club stalwart Àngel Rangel over the 2015–16 season, before becoming first choice in the 2016–17 season. On 13 May 2017, Naughton scored his first goal for the club and his first in the Premier League in a crucial 2–0 victory over Sunderland, which helped to retain Swansea's Premier League status that year.

On 1 September 2018, Naughton scored a long-range effort away to Millwall to help Swansea to a late win while playing in the unusual position of central midfield. On 23 February 2019, Naughton played his 100th game for Swansea in a 3–1 defeat to Sheffield Wednesday. In the 2019–20 season, Naughton played much of the season as a centre back under new coach Steve Cooper as Swansea lost in the Championship play-offs to Brentford. On 5 February 2021, Naughton made his 200th Swansea City appearance in a 2–0 win over Championship leaders Norwich City. The season would end with defeat in the play-offs to Brentford once again.

Under new manager Russell Martin, Naughton frequently played as the middle centre back in a back three, averaging the most passes and the highest passing accuracy among defenders in the league. At the end of the 2022–23 season, Naughton was not named on Swansea's retained list, having seen his play time diminish, but did sign a one-year contract on 7 June 2023. Naughton made his 300th appearance for Swansea in a 2–1 victory over Sunderland on 24 February 2024. On 16 May 2024, Naughton signed a further one-year contract. On 2 May 2025, it was announced that Naughton would depart Swansea at the end of the 2024–25 EFL Championship season. Naughton made his final appearance for Swansea from the bench, replacing fellow departee Joe Allen in a 3–3 draw with Oxford United.

== International career ==
In November 2008, after only eleven league appearances, Naughton was called up to the England under-21 team for the friendly against the Czech Republic under-21 team at Bramall Lane. He duly made his England debut, coming on as a 60th-minute substitute in a 2–0 victory. Naughton is also eligible to play for the Republic of Ireland national team.

== Career statistics ==
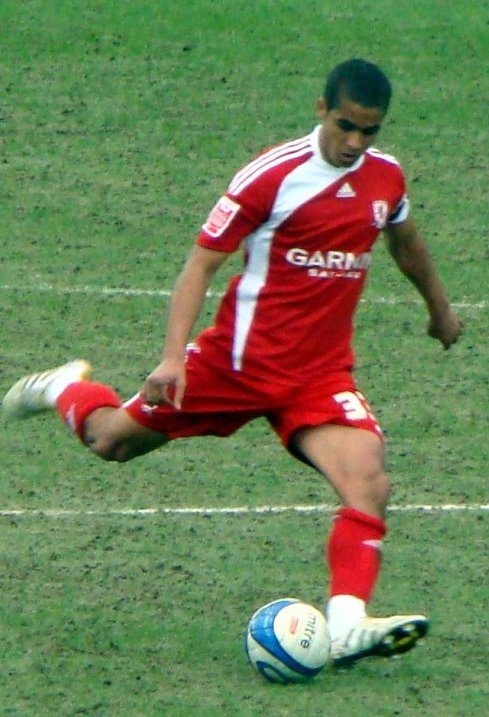
Naughton playing for Middlesbrough in 2010

As of match played 3 May 2025

Appearances and goals by club, season and competition
Club	Season	League			National Cup (Note: Includes FA Cup, Scottish Cup)		League Cup (Note: Includes League/EFL Cup)		Other		Total	
Club	Season	Division	Apps	Goals	Apps	Goals	Apps	Goals	Apps	Goals	Apps	Goals
Sheffield United	2007–08	Championship	0	0	0	0	0	0	—		0	0
Sheffield United	2008–09	Championship	40	1	4	1	3	1	3 (Note: Appearances in Championship play-offs)	0	50	3
Sheffield United	Total		40	1	4	1	3	1	3	0	50	3
Gretna (loan)	2007–08	Scottish Premier League	18	0	1	0	—		—		19	0
Tottenham Hotspur	2009–10	Premier League	1	0	1	0	1	0	—		3	0
Tottenham Hotspur	2010–11	Premier League	0	0	—		1	0	0	0	1	0
Tottenham Hotspur	2012–13	Premier League	14	0	2	0	1	0	9 (Note: Appearances in UEFA Europa League)	0	26	0
Tottenham Hotspur	2013–14	Premier League	22	0	0	0	1	0	11	0	34	0
Tottenham Hotspur	2014–15	Premier League	5	0	0	0	2	0	3	0	10	0
Tottenham Hotspur	Total		42	0	3	0	6	0	23	0	74	0
Middlesbrough (loan)	2009–10	Championship	15	0	—		—		—		15	0
Leicester City (loan)	2010–11	Championship	34	5	2	0	—		—		36	5
Norwich City (loan)	2011–12	Premier League	32	0	0	0	0	0	—		32	0
Swansea City	2014–15	Premier League	10	0	0	0	—		—		10	0
Swansea City	2015–16	Premier League	27	0	0	0	1	0	—		28	0
Swansea City	2016–17	Premier League	31	1	1	0	1	0	—		33	1
Swansea City	2017–18	Premier League	34	0	4	1	1	0	—		39	1
Swansea City	2018–19	Championship	35	1	2	0	1	0	—		38	1
Swansea City	2019–20	Championship	32	3	0	0	2	0	1	0	35	3
Swansea City	2020–21	Championship	30	0	1	0	1	0	3	0	35	0
Swansea City	2021–22	Championship	38	0	1	0	2	0	0	0	41	0
Swansea City	2022–23	Championship	25	0	1	0	0	0	0	0	26	0
Swansea City	2023–24	Championship	15	0	2	0	2	0	0	0	19	0
Swansea City	2024–25	Championship	23	0	1	0	2	0	0	0	25	0
Total			300	5	13	1	13	0	4	0	329	6
Swansea City U23	2016–17	—			—		—		1 (Note: Appearance in EFL Trophy)	0	1	0
Career total			458	11	22	2	20	1	31	0	530	14

== Honours ==
Individual

- PFA Team of the Year: 2008–09 Championship, 2010–11 Championship
- Leicester City Young Player of the Year: 2010–11
- Sheffield United Young Player of the Year: 2008–09
