= Connor Roberts (footballer, born 1995) =

Welsh footballer (born 1995)

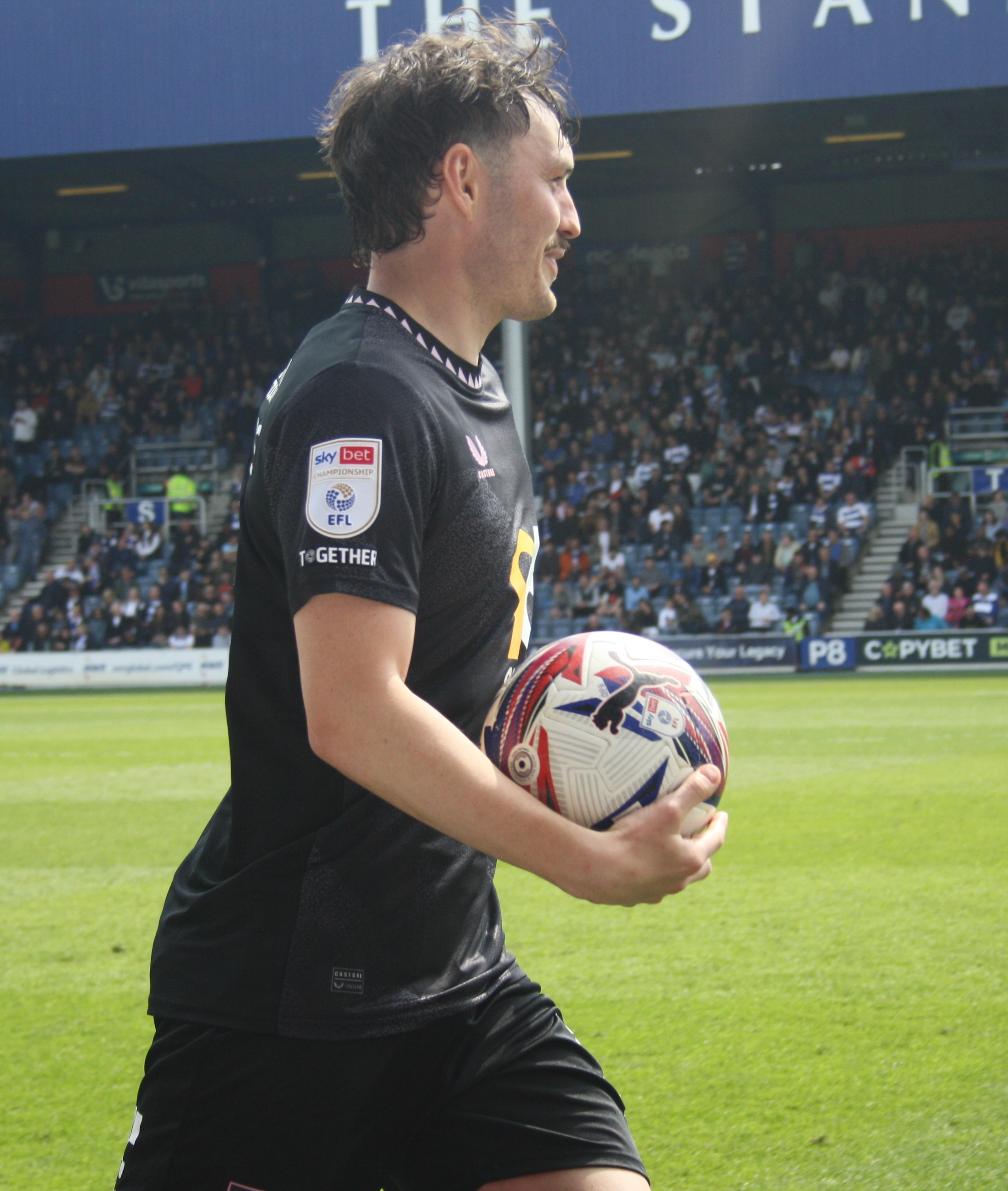
- Roberts in 2025.

Personal information
- Full name: Connor Richard John Roberts
- Date of birth: 23 September 1995 (age 31)
- Place of birth: Neath, Wales
- Height: 5 ft 9 in (1.75 m)
- Position: Right-back

Team information
- Current team: Burnley
- Number: 14

Youth career
- 2004–2015: Swansea City

Senior career*
Years	Team	Apps	(Gls)
2015–2021	Swansea City	133	(11)
2015–2016	→ Yeovil Town (loan)	45	(0)
2016	→ Bristol Rovers (loan)	2	(0)
2017–2018	→ Middlesbrough (loan)	1	(0)
2021–	Burnley	127	(7)
2024	→ Leeds United (loan)	12	(1)

International career^{‡}
2014	Wales U19	1	(0)
2016	Wales U21	2	(1)
2018–	Wales	67	(3)
- * Club domestic league appearances and goals as of 09:46, 8 November 2026 (UTC) ‡ National team caps and goals as of 22:08, 17 November 2026 (UTC)

Connor Richard John Roberts (born 23 September 1995) is a Welsh professional footballer who plays as a right-back for EFL Championship club Burnley and the Wales national team.

== Club career ==
=== Early career ===
Born in Neath, Roberts grew up in the nearby village of Crynant in Neath Port Talbot and joined Swansea City's Youth Academy at the age of 9. After progressing through the academy, Roberts won the 2014–15 Professional U21 Development League 2 title in his debut professional season and was rewarded with a new two-year contract.

Roberts signed a new three-year contract with Swansea City in September 2016. Upon returning from Bristol Rovers, Roberts linked up with Swansea City Under-23s and went on to win the 2016–17 Professional U23 Development League 2 title and 2016–17 Premier League Cup.

=== Loan moves ===
On 8 August 2015, Roberts joined League Two club Yeovil Town on a one-month loan deal, and made his debut later that day in a 3–2 defeat against Exeter City. Roberts quickly established himself at Huish Park, and the Glovers extended Roberts' loan contract to the end of the 2015–16 season. Roberts made 54 appearances for Yeovil over the course of the season, missing just one match due to a call-up to the Wales under-21 national team. Roberts received three Player of the Year Awards and was also voted Young Player of the Year.

In August 2016, Roberts joined League One club Bristol Rovers on a six-month loan deal. Roberts made his debut in a 3–2 victory over Northampton Town on 1 October 2016, and made a further four appearances for the Pirates before returning to Swansea.

On 14 July 2017, it was announced that Roberts would be joining Championship club Middlesbrough on a season-long loan deal. After making one league appearance his loan spell was terminated in January and he returned to Swansea City.

=== Swansea City ===
Roberts made his debut for Swansea City on 6 January 2018 in the FA Cup third round against Wolverhampton Wanderers. On 29 September, he scored his first goal for the club in a 3–0 win over Queens Park Rangers. On 3 June 2021, Roberts was named Swansea City Player of the Year for the 2020–21 season.

=== Burnley ===
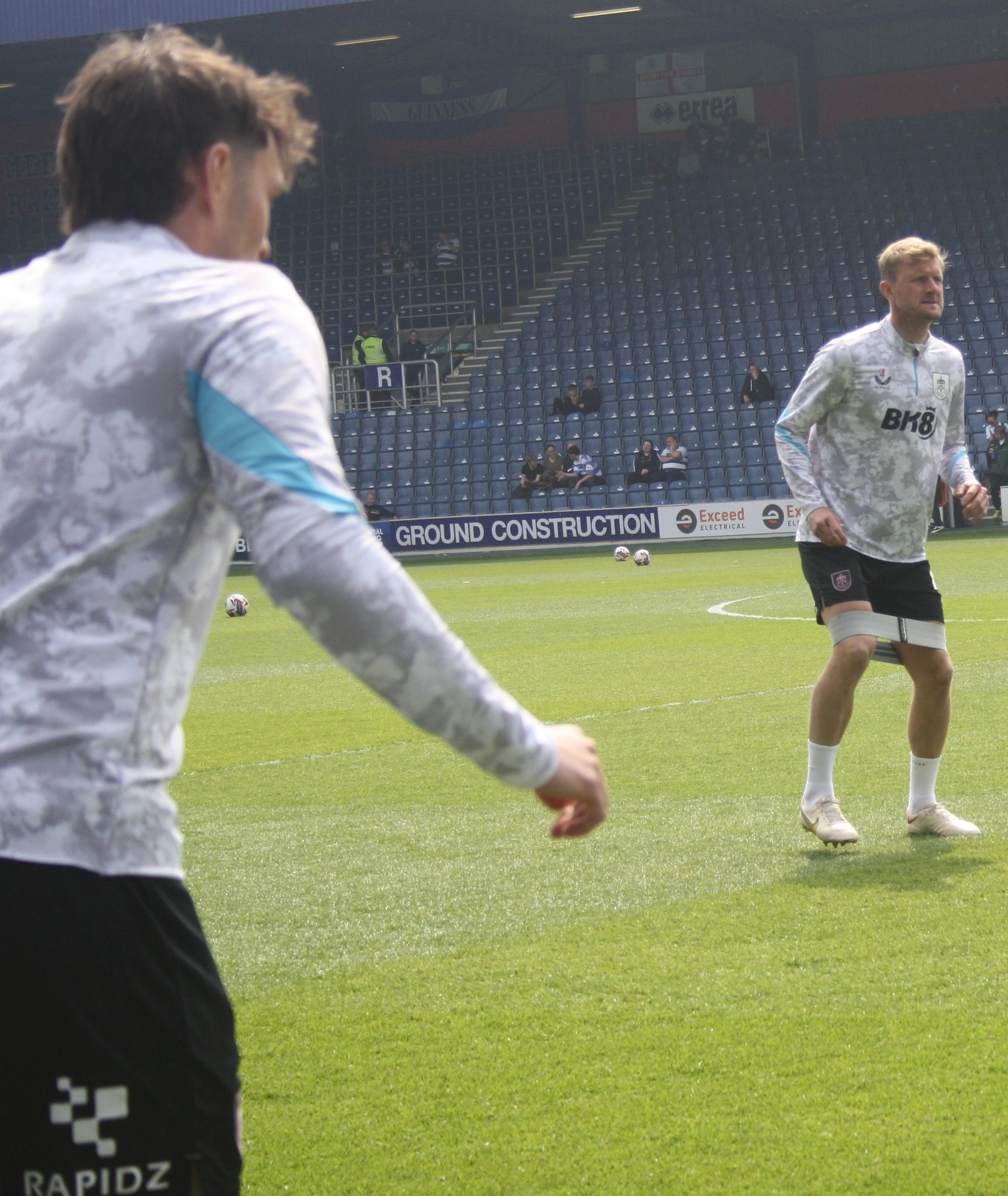
Roberts training prior to a match in 2025.

On 31 August 2021, Roberts joined Premier League side Burnley for an undisclosed fee signing a four-year deal. On 23 April 2023 Roberts was named in the EFL Championship Team of the Season.

On 1 February 2024, Roberts joined EFL Championship side Leeds United on loan until the end of the 2023–24 season.

He scored his first goal for Leeds United against Leicester City on 23 February 2024, the equaliser in a 3–1 home win. On 21 May 2024, Burnley said he would return to the club once the loan ended.

== International career ==
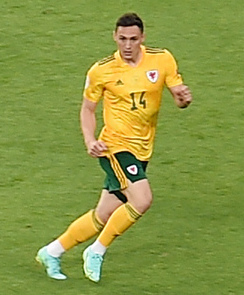
Roberts playing for Wales at the UEFA Euro 2020.

Roberts has been capped at Wales under-19 level. In March 2016, Roberts received his first call-up to the Wales under-21 side for their 2017 UEFA European Under-21 Championship qualification matches, and made his debut as a second-half substitute in their 2–1 defeat against Romania, on 29 March 2016.

He was called into the Wales senior national team for the first time on 15 March 2018. He made his senior international debut in the China Cup final against Uruguay in March 2018 when he came on as a 59th minute substitute for Declan John. Roberts scored his first goal for the senior team in a 4–1 victory over the Republic of Ireland on 6 September 2018, finishing a half-volley set up by Gareth Bale. In May 2021, he was selected for the Wales squad for the delayed UEFA Euro 2020 tournament. On 16 June, Roberts scored the second goal in a 2–0 win against Turkey, once again assisted by Bale. On 26 June, Roberts' participation in the tournament ended due to a groin injury sustained in the first half, and Wales went on to lose 4–0 to Denmark.

In November 2022 he was named in the Wales squad for the 2022 FIFA World Cup in Qatar.

== Career statistics ==
=== Club ===
As of match played 7 November 2026

Appearances and goals by club, season and competition
Club	Season	League			FA Cup		League Cup		Other		Total	
Club	Season	Division	Apps	Goals	Apps	Goals	Apps	Goals	Apps	Goals	Apps	Goals
Swansea City	2015–16	Premier League	0	0	—		—		—		0	0
Swansea City	2016–17	Premier League	0	0	—		—		—		0	0
Swansea City	2017–18	Premier League	4	0	7	0	—		—		11	0
Swansea City	2018–19	Championship	45	5	4	0	0	0	—		49	5
Swansea City	2019–20	Championship	38	1	1	0	1	0	2 (Note: Appearances in Championship play-offs)	0	42	1
Swansea City	2020–21	Championship	46	5	2	0	0	0	2	0	50	5
Swansea City	Total		133	11	14	0	1	0	4	0	152	11
Yeovil Town (loan)	2015–16	League Two	45	0	4	0	1	0	4 (Note: Appearance(s) in EFL Trophy)	0	54	0
Bristol Rovers (loan)	2016–17	League One	2	0	2	0	0	0	1	0	5	0
Middlesbrough (loan)	2017–18	Championship	1	0	—		3	0	—		4	0
Burnley	2021–22	Premier League	21	1	0	0	1	0	—		22	1
Burnley	2022–23	Championship	43	4	5	1	2	0	—		50	5
Burnley	2023–24	Premier League	14	0	—		2	0	—		16	0
Burnley	2024–25	Championship	41	2	0	0	1	0	—		42	2
Burnley	2025–26	Premier League	0	0	0	0	0	0	—		0	0
Burnley	2026–27	Championship	8	0	0	0	2	0	—		10	0
Burnley	Total		127	7	5	1	8	0	—		140	8
Leeds United (loan)	2023–24	Championship	12	1	1	0	—		2	0	16	1
Career total			321	19	26	1	13	0	11	0	370	20

=== International ===
As of match played 17 November 2026

Appearances and goals by national team and year
National team	Year	Apps	Goals
Wales	2018	8	1
Wales	2019	8	0
Wales	2020	6	0
Wales	2021	12	2
Wales	2022	10	0
Wales	2023	9	0
Wales	2024	7	0
Wales	2025	3	0
Wales	2026	4	0
Total		67	3

As of match played 13 November 2021. Wales' score listed first, score column indicates score after each Roberts goal.

List of international goals scored by Connor Roberts
No.	Date	Venue	Cap	Opponent	Score	Result	Competition
1	6 September 2018	Cardiff City Stadium, Cardiff, Wales	3	Republic of Ireland	4–0	4–1	2018–19 UEFA Nations League B
2	16 June 2021	Baku Olympic Stadium, Baku, Azerbaijan	28	Turkey	2–0	2–0	UEFA Euro 2020
3	13 November 2021	Cardiff City Stadium, Cardiff, Wales	33	Belarus	5–1	5–1	2022 FIFA World Cup qualification

== Honours ==
Swansea City U23

- Premier League Cup: 2016–17

Burnley

- EFL Championship: 2022–23

Individual

- EFL Championship Team of the Season: 2022–23
- PFA Team of the Year: 2022–23 Championship
- Swansea City Player of the Year: 2020–21
