= Cameron Evans =

Welsh footballer

Personal information
- Full name: Cameron James Evans
- Date of birth: 23 February 2001 (age 25)
- Place of birth: Swansea, Wales
- Height: 1.82 m (6 ft 0 in)
- Positions: Full-back; midfielder

Team information
- Current team: Newport County
- Number: 2

Youth career
- –2020: Swansea City

Senior career*
Years	Team	Apps	(Gls)
2020–2022	Swansea City	0	(0)
2021	→ Waterford (loan)	30	(0)
2022	Sligo Rovers	2	(0)
2023–2024	Taunton Town	65	(7)
2024–	Newport County	72	(5)

International career
2018	Wales U19	9	(0)
- * Club domestic league appearances and goals as of 08:52, 3 November 2026 (UTC)

Cameron James Evans (born 23 February 2001) is a Welsh professional footballer who plays as a full-back or midfielder for EFL League Two club Newport County.

== Club career ==
=== Swansea City ===
Evans is a product of the Swansea City academy and he signed his first professional contract in July 2019 for one year. Cameron Evans made his senior debut for Swansea City on 9 January 2021 in the starting line up for the 2–0 FA Cup third round win against Stevenage. He was released by Swansea City at the end of his contract on 30 June 2022.

==== Waterford loan ====
On 21 February 2021, it was announced that Evans had signed for League of Ireland Premier Division side Waterford on a season long loan, ahead of the 2021 season under new manager Kevin Sheedy. He made his debut for the club in the opening game of the season on 19 March 2021, as his side lost 1–0 away to newly promoted side Drogheda United. On 27 August 2021, Evans scored his first goal in senior football in the Second Round of the FAI Cup in a 4–1 win over non league side Kilnamanagh. Evans made a total of 35 appearances in all competitions for the club as they were relegated to the League of Ireland First Division.

=== Sligo Rovers ===
Evans signed for League of Ireland Premier Division club Sligo Rovers on 10 August 2022.

=== Taunton Town ===
Evans joined National League South side Taunton Town on a six-month contract on 22 January 2023.

=== Newport County ===
In July 2024 Evans joined EFL League Two club Newport County on a two year contract. He made his debut for Newport on 13 August 2024 in the 4-1 EFL Cup first round defeat to Leyton Orient. Evans scored his first goal for Newport on 28 September 2024 in the 2-1 League Two win against Crewe Alexandra. In June 2026 Evans accepted a contract extension at Newport.

== International career ==
Evans was a Wales under-19 international.

== Personal life ==
He is the younger brother of professional footballer Jack Evans.

== Career statistics ==
As of end of 2023–24 season

Appearances and goals by club, season and competition
Club	Season	League			National Cup (Note: Includes FA Cup & FAI Cup)		League Cup		Other		Total	
Club	Season	Division	Apps	Goals	Apps	Goals	Apps	Goals	Apps	Goals	Apps	Goals
Swansea City U23	2018–19	—			—		—		1 (Note: Appearance in EFL Trophy)	0	1	0
Swansea City	2020–21	Championship	0	0	1	0	0	0	—		1	0
Swansea City	2021–22	Championship	0	0	0	0	—		—		0	0
Swansea City	Total		0	0	1	0	0	0	—		1	0
Waterford (loan)	2021	LOI Premier Division	30	0	4	1	—		1 (Note: Appearances in 2021 League of Ireland promotion/relegation playoffs)	0	35	1
Sligo Rovers	2022	LOI Premier Division	2	0	—		—		0 (Note: Appearances in UEFA Europa Conference League)	0	2	0
Taunton Town	2022–23	National League South	22	3	—		—		—		22	3
Taunton Town	2023–24	National League South	43	4	2	0	—		0	0	45	4
Taunton Town	Total		65	7	2	0	0	0	0	0	67	7
Career total			97	7	7	1	0	0	2	0	106	8
