= Daniel Matsuzaka =

Japanese footballer (born 1997)

Personal information
- Full name: Daniel Lewis Matsuzaka
- Date of birth: 13 August 1997 (age 29)
- Place of birth: Barnet, England
- Height: 1.91 m (6 ft 3 in)
- Position: Centre-back

Youth career
- 2013–2014: Southend United

Senior career*
Years	Team	Apps	(Gls)
2014–2018	Southend United	0	(0)
2014–2015	→ Harlow Town (loan)	9	(0)
2018	Kataller Toyama	0	(0)
2019	Braintree Town	12	(0)
2019	Sutton United	9	(0)
2019–2020	Braintree Town	15	(0)
2020–2022	Oxford City	37	(2)
2022–2023	Weymouth	22	(2)
2023	→ Hendon (loan)	14	(0)
2023–2024	Hendon	36	(3)

International career
2015	Japan U19	2	(0)
- * Club domestic league appearances and goals as of 10:53, 18 September 2024 (UTC)

Daniel Lewis Matsuzaka (松坂 暖, Matsuzaka Dan; born 13 August 1997) is a footballer who plays as a centre-back.

== Club career ==
Matsuzaka joined Southend United as a youth, having previously played youth football for Crystal Palace, and played for the club in the FA Youth Cup. In 2014 he was loaned to Harlow Town for the remainder of the 2014–15 season, making nine appearances in the league and one in the play-offs. He was given the number 34 shirt at Southend for the 2015–16 season, and made his first team debut against Brighton & Hove Albion U23 in the EFL Trophy in August 2016, coming on as a sub in the 28th minute.

In May 2017 Southend announced Matsuzaka would have his contract extended, and he was given the number 28 shirt for the 2017–18 season.

On 1 August 2018, Matsuzaka signed for J3 League side Kataller Toyama. On 23 November 2018, it was announced that Matsuzaka's contract at Kataller would not be renewed and he would leave the club without making an appearance.

Matsuzaka joined Braintree Town on 18 January 2019. He subsequently signed for Sutton United in July 2019, before returning to Braintree in December. On 21 August 2020, Matsuzaka joined National League South side Oxford City.

In July 2022, Matsuzaka joined National League South side Weymouth. He later went on to play for Hendon before leaving the club in July 2024 to take a break from playing football.

== Personal life ==
Matsuzaka worked as a PE teacher at Durston House before being appointed as head of football at St Benedict's School in September 2024.

== International career ==
In 2015 Matsuzaka was called up to play for Japan U19, playing two friendly matches against Birmingham City U21 and Liverpool U21.

== Personal life ==
Matsuzaka was born in London to a Japanese father and an English mother.
