= Gregor Zabret =

Slovenian football goalkeeper (born 1995)

Personal information
- Date of birth: 18 August 1995 (age 31)
- Place of birth: Ljubljana, Slovenia
- Height: 1.87 m (6 ft 2 in)
- Position: Goalkeeper

Youth career
- 2002–2008: Domžale
- 2008–2009: Interblock
- 2009–2011: Domžale

Senior career*
Years	Team	Apps	(Gls)
2011–2013	Domžale	14	(0)
2013–2020	Swansea City	0	(0)
2019	→ Oldham Athletic (loan)	0	(0)
2021	Ashton Athletic	2	(0)
2021–2022	Aberystwyth Town	27	(0)
2024	Widnes		
2024	Barnoldswick Town		

International career
2010	Slovenia U16	2	(0)
2011–2012	Slovenia U17	14	(0)
2013	Slovenia U19	5	(0)
2015–2016	Slovenia U21	5	(0)
- * Club domestic league appearances and goals as of 1 July 2022

Gregor Zabret (born 18 August 1995) is a Slovenian footballer who plays as a goalkeeper.

== Club career ==
=== Domžale ===
Zabret was promoted to Domžale's first team in 2011, and made his first team debut on 26 November 2011, in a 2–0 home defeat against Celje.

=== Swansea City ===
On 2 July 2013, Zabret signed a two-year deal with Swansea City, for an undisclosed fee.

In July 2015, Zabret signed a one-year contract extension with Swansea, keeping him at the club until June 2016. Zabret signed a new two-year contract in July 2016.

On 3 February 2020, Zabret left the club following his contract being mutually terminated.

==== Loan to Oldham Athletic ====
On 5 July 2019, Zabret signed for League Two side Oldham Athletic on a season-long loan.

=== Aberystwyth Town ===
On 8 August 2021, Zabret signed for Cymru Premier side Aberystwyth Town.

== International career ==
Zabret has represented Slovenia at under-16, under-17, under-19, and under-21 levels.

== Honours ==
Swansea City U23

- Premier League Cup: 2016–17
