= Adnan Marić =

Swedish footballer

Adnan Maric
Personal information
- Full name: Adnan Marić
- Date of birth: 17 February 1997 (age 29)
- Place of birth: Gothenburg, Sweden
- Height: 1.81 m (5 ft 11 in)
- Position: Midfielder

Youth career
- Gunnilse IS
- 2013–2014: GAIS
- 2014–2017: Swansea City

Senior career*
Years	Team	Apps	(Gls)
2013–2014	GAIS	7	(0)
2017–2019	Swansea City	0	(0)
2020	BK Häcken	7	(0)
2020–2021	GAIS	28	(4)
2022	Jönköpings Södra	13	(2)
2023	Varbergs BoIS	2	(0)
2024	Arendal	12	(1)

International career
2012–2013	Sweden U17	3	(0)
2014–2016	Sweden U19	6	(0)
2016	Sweden Olympic	1	(0)
- * Club domestic league appearances and goals as of 30 May 2024

Adnan Marić (Serbo-Croatian pronunciation: [mǎːritɕ]; born 17 February 1997) is a Swedish footballer who last played for Norwegian club Arendal.

== Club career ==
Maric's mother club is Gunnilse IS. He played eight matches in the 2012 season in Division 2 Västra Götaland.

In January 2013, he signed a three-year contract with an option for another year with Gais. On 16 February 2014 he scored his first goal for Gais A team in a training match against the Norwegian East Side as Gais water with 3–1.

In April 2014, he signed for the Welsh Premier League club Swansea City's youth team. In March 2016, he extended his contract for three years. He made his debut in an FA Cup match against Notts County on 6 February 2018.

On 14 December 2021, Marić signed a two-year deal with Jönköpings Södra.

On 4 April 2024, Marić joined Arendal in Norwegian third-tier Second Division. He left Arendal in July 2024.

== Career statistics ==
As of 11:08, 12 December 2018 (UTC)

Appearances and goals by club, season and competition
Club	Season	League			FA Cup		League Cup		Other		Total	
Club	Season	Division	Apps	Goals	Apps	Goals	Apps	Goals	Apps	Goals	Apps	Goals
GAIS	2013	Superettan	7	0	1	0	0	0	—		8	0
Swansea City	2017–18	Premier League	0	0	1	0	0	0	—		1	0
Swansea City U23s (Note: Appearances in the EFL Trophy)	2016–17	Premier League 2	—		—		—		3	0	3	0
Swansea City U23s	2017–18	Premier League 2	—		—		—		2	0	2	0
Swansea City U23s	2018–19	Premier League 2	—		—		—		2	1	2	1
Swansea City U23s	Total		—		—		—		7	1	7	1
Career total			7	0	2	0	0	0	7	1	16	1

== Honours ==
Swansea City U23

- Premier League Cup: 2016–17
