= Jack Evans (footballer, born 1998) =

Welsh footballer

Personal information
- Full name: Jack Marcus Evans
- Date of birth: 25 April 1998 (age 28)
- Place of birth: Swansea, Wales
- Position: Midfielder

Team information
- Current team: Merthyr Town
- Number: 14

Youth career
- Swansea City

Senior career*
Years	Team	Apps	(Gls)
2019–2021	Swansea City	0	(0)
2020	→ Mansfield Town (loan)	0	(0)
2020–2021	→ Pafos (loan)	2	(0)
2021	Newport County	1	(0)
2021–2022	Penybont	14	(0)
2022–2023	Merthyr Town	55	(1)
2023–2024	Farsley Celtic	25	(0)
2024–	Merthyr Town	3	(0)

International career^{‡}
2016	Wales U19	2	(0)
2017	Wales U20	3	(0)
2017–2020	Wales U21	13	(0)
- * Club domestic league appearances and goals as of 02:26, 14 September 2024 (UTC) ‡ National team caps and goals as of 18:25, 4 September 2020 (UTC)

Jack Marcus Evans (born 25 April 1998) is a Welsh professional footballer who plays as a midfielder most recently for Merthyr Town.

== Club career ==
Evans joined Swansea City at the age of eight. In the summer of 2018, he was diagnosed with cancer. In February 2019, whilst in remission from the disease, Evans signed a new contract with Swansea. On 28 August 2019, he made his debut for Swansea, as a second-half substitute in a 6–0 EFL Cup home win against Cambridge United.

On 31 January 2020, Evans joined League Two side Mansfield Town on loan for the remainder of the 2019–20 season.

On 9 September 2020, Evans joined Cypriot First Division side Pafos on loan for the 2020–21 season.

On 8 January 2021, Evans joined League Two side Newport County on a permanent contract until the end of the 2020–21 season. He made his Newport debut as a first-half substitute in the 1–0 League Two defeat to Southend United on 9 February 2021. He left the club at the end of the season, following the expiry of his contract.

In August 2021, Evans joined Cymru Premier side Penybont.

On 3 March 2022, Evans signed for Southern League Premier Division South side Merthyr Town.

== International career ==
Evans first represented Wales under-19s in November 2016, playing against Greece and England. In June 2017, he played three times for Wales U20 at the 2017 Toulon Tournament. Evans has also represented Wales U21.

== Personal life ==
Jack Evans is the older brother of professional footballer Cameron Evans.

== Honours ==
Swansea City U23

- Premier League Cup: 2016–17

Merthyr Town

- Southern League Premier Division South Champion: 2024-2025
