= 2017–18 Premier League Cup =

Tournament details
- Country: England; Wales
- Teams: 36

Final positions
- Champions: Aston Villa (1st Title)
- Runners-up: Swansea City (1st Runner Up Finish)

Tournament statistics
- Matches played: 115
- Goals scored: 366 (3.18 per match)
- Top goal scorer: (England) Luke Charman Newcastle United (8 Goals)

The 2017–18 Premier League Cup was the fifth edition of the competition. The defending champions were Swansea City, who won the 2016–17 competition.

== Participants ==
36 teams participated in the competition this year, one fewer than last year. AFC Wimbledon, Fulham, Huddersfield Town, Reading, West Ham United, did not return after playing 4 seasons in the competition. Manchester City did not return after playing last years competition.

3 teams returned to the competition this year. Bristol Rovers returned after the inaugural competition in 2013-2014, Aston Villa returned after last competing in 2014-2015, and Exeter City returned since last competing in 2015-2016. Bury and Dagenham & Redbridge will participate for the first time in the competition this year.

=== Category 1 ===
- Aston Villa
- Blackburn Rovers
- Brighton & Hove Albion
- Derby County
- Everton
- Leicester City
- Liverpool
- Middlesbrough
- Newcastle United
- Norwich City
- Southampton
- Stoke City
- Sunderland
- Swansea City
- West Bromwich Albion
- Wolverhampton Wanderers

=== Category 2 ===
- Barnsley
- Birmingham City
- Bristol City
- Burnley
- Cardiff City
- Charlton Athletic
- Colchester United
- Hull City
- Ipswich Town
- Nottingham Forest
- Sheffield United
- Watford

=== Category 3 ===
- AFC Bournemouth
- Bristol Rovers
- Bury
- Dagenham & Redbridge
- Exeter City
- Portsmouth
- Southend United
- Wigan Athletic

== Qualifying round ==
A qualifying round was required to finalise the 32 teams that would enter the Group Stage.

22 August 2017	Bury	1–1 (12–11 p)	Bristol Rovers	Bury
19:00	Cooney 53'	Report	Dünnwald-Turan 36'	Stadium: Gigg Lane
	Penalties
	Adams (penalty scored); Cooney (penalty scored); Alli (penalty scored); Hill (penalty scored); Skarz (penalty missed); Hulme (penalty scored); Danns (penalty scored); Styles (penalty scored); Shotton (penalty scored); Nyaupembe (penalty scored); Fasan (penalty scored); Adams (penalty scored); Cooney (penalty scored)		(penalty scored) Dünnwald-Turan; (penalty missed) Ellington; (penalty scored) Ten-Grotenhuis; (penalty scored) Kelly; (penalty scored) Jones; (penalty scored) Hargreaves; (penalty scored) Ebbutt; (penalty scored) Ludford-Ison; (penalty scored) Russe; (penalty scored) Menayese; (penalty scored) Jonkerman; (penalty scored) Dünnwald-Turan; (penalty missed) Ellington

23 August 2017	Portsmouth	1–0	Southend United	Havant
19:00	Chaplin 7'	Report		Stadium: West Leigh Park; Referee: Tristan Greaves

5 September 2017	Dagenham & Redbridge	1–2	Exeter City	Dagenham
19:00	Romain 34'	Report	Jay 61', 70'	Stadium: Victoria Road

12 September 2017	Wigan Athletic	1–3	AFC Bournemouth	Wigan
19:00	Barragán 10'		Harfield 48'; Mahoney 52'; Dunkley 61' (own goal)	Stadium: Robin Park Arena

== Group stage ==
Teams play each other twice, with the group winners and runners–up advance to the round of 16.

=== Group A ===
Team	Pld	W	D	L	GF	GA	GD	Pts
Derby County	6	4	0	2	14	8	+6	12
Middlesbrough	6	3	0	3	9	8	+1	9
Birmingham City	6	3	0	3	10	14	−4	9
Nottingham Forest	6	2	0	4	7	10	−3	6

Updated to match(es) played on 26 February 2018. Source:

23 September 2017	Birmingham City	0–1	Derby County	Great Barr
13:00			Zanzala 50'	Stadium: BCFA Headquarters

2 October 2017	Nottingham Forest	0–3	Middlesbrough	Alfreton
19:00			Armstrong 56'; Miller 52'; Coulson 81'	Stadium: North Street

6 November 2017	Middlesbrough	1–3	Birmingham City	Bishop Auckland
19:00	Caliman 25'		Hale 67', 87'; O'Keeffe 90+3'	Stadium: Heritage Park

6 November 2017	Derby County	1–2	Nottingham Forest	Derby
19:00	Vernam 12'		Clough 31'; Cash 50'	Stadium: Pride Park Stadium

1 December 2017	Birmingham City	1–3	Nottingham Forest	Nuneaton
14:00	McCoy 21'		Gomis 13', 26'; Edser 19'	Stadium: Liberty Way; Attendance: 63

1 December 2017	Derby County	2–1	Middlesbrough	Burton upon Trent
19:00	Vernam 27'; Thomas 58'		Coulson 12'	Stadium: St George's Park National Football Centre

22 January 2018	Derby County	7–2	Birmingham City	Burton upon Trent
19:00	Walker 14', 45' (pen.), 50', 79'; Cover 30'; Anya 55', 66'		Hutton 5'; McFarlane 28' (pen.)	Stadium: St George's Park National Football Centre; Attendance: 154

5 February 2018	Nottingham Forest	1–2	Birmingham City	Alfreton
13:00	Dekel Daks 73'		McCoy 53'; Bernard 57'	Stadium: North Street; Attendance: 94

12 February 2018	Nottingham Forest	1–2	Derby County	Nottingham
19:00	Walters 84'		Babos 25', 66'	Stadium: City Ground

12 February 2018	Birmingham City	2–1	Middlesbrough	Nuneaton
19:00	McFarlane 52'; McCoy 61'		O'Neill 16'	Stadium: Liberty Way; Attendance: 52

23 February 2018	Middlesbrough	2–1	Derby County	Bishop Auckland
19:00	Coulson 79'; Armstrong 83'		Walker 13'	Stadium: Heritage Park

26 February 2018	Middlesbrough	1–0	Nottingham Forest	Bishop Auckland
19:00	Armstrong 30'			Stadium: Heritage Park; Attendance: 82

=== Group B ===
Team	Pld	W	D	L	GF	GA	GD	Pts
Blackburn Rovers	6	3	2	1	13	6	+7	11
Southampton	6	3	1	2	6	3	+3	10
Cardiff City	6	2	2	2	9	8	+1	8
Watford	6	1	1	4	4	15	−11	4

Updated to match(es) played on 31 March 2018. Source:

29 September 2017	Southampton	1–2	Watford	Marchwood
19:00	Slattery 78' (pen.)	Report	Folivi 23' (pen.); Dja Djedje 66'	Stadium: Staplewood Campus; Attendance: 100

9 October 2017	Blackburn Rovers	3–3	Cardiff City	Leyland
19:00	Nuttall 1', 87'; Butterworth 48'		Paterson 17', 56', 90+1'	Stadium: County Ground; Attendance: 238

2 November 2017	Cardiff City	0–1	Southampton	Cardiff Bay
13:00		Report	Johnson 82'	Stadium: Cardiff International Sports Village; Attendance: 100

3 November 2017	Blackburn Rovers	6–1	Watford	Leyland
19:00	Wright 32', 34'; Mansell 51'; Doyle 58'; Wharton 61'; Butterworth 63'		Folivi 81'	Stadium: County Ground; Attendance: 137

4 December 2017	Southampton	2–0	Blackburn Rovers	Marchwood
19:00	Valery 45+1'; Targett 54'	Report		Stadium: Staplewood Campus; Attendance: 50

1 February 2018	Cardiff City	1–1	Watford	Leckwith
13:00	Obi 75'		Charles 90'	Stadium: Cardiff City Stadium

9 February 2018	Southampton	0–1	Cardiff City	Marchwood
19:00		Report	Gyasi 76'	Stadium: Staplewood Campus; Attendance: 60

12 February 2018	Watford	0–1	Blackburn Rovers	Watford
13:00			Vale 73'	Stadium: Vicarage Road

15 February 2018	Watford	0–2	Southampton	Watford
19:00		Report	Slattery 5', 33' (pen.)	Stadium: Vicarage Road; Attendance: 100

22 February 2018	Cardiff City	0–3	Blackburn Rovers	Cardiff Bay
12:00			Magloire 6'; Mansell 10'; Nuttall 54'	Stadium: Cardiff International Sports Village

26 February 2018	Blackburn Rovers	0–0	Southampton	Leyland
19:00		Report		Stadium: County Ground; Attendance: 185

31 March 2018	Watford	0–4	Cardiff City	Watford
13:45			Obi 2', 3'; Meite 31'; Ochieng 40'	Stadium: Vicarage Road

=== Group C ===
Team	Pld	W	D	L	GF	GA	GD	Pts
Wolverhampton Wanderers	6	4	1	1	14	12	+2	13
AFC Bournemouth	6	3	1	2	16	7	+9	10
Norwich City	6	3	1	2	8	8	0	10
Bury	6	0	1	5	4	15	−11	1

Updated to match(es) played on 26 February 2018. Source:

4 October 2017	AFC Bournemouth	3–2	Norwich City	Boscombe
19:00	Afobe 38', 75', 89'		Abrahams 72', 77'	Stadium: Dean Court

9 October 2017	Bury	2–3	Wolverhampton Wanderers	Bury
19:00	Harker 20'; Nyaupembe 46'		Armstrong 44'; Wilson 58'; Odofin 80'	Stadium: Gigg Lane

6 November 2017	Wolverhampton Wanderers	3–3	Norwich City	Wellington
19:00	Wilson 18'; Collins 32'; Seedorf 36'	Report	Cantwell 45+2', 90+4'; Abrahams 89'	Stadium: New Bucks Head; Attendance: 133

4 December 2017	Bury	0–1	Norwich City	Bury
19:00			Abrahams 51'	Stadium: Gigg Lane

5 December 2017	Wolverhampton Wanderers	2–1	AFC Bournemouth	Wellington
19:00	Deslandes 42'; Gibbs-White 86'	Report	Ndjoli 11'	Stadium: New Bucks Head; Attendance: 105

22 January 2018	Norwich City	1–0	AFC Bournemouth	Norwich
19:00	Cantwell 90'			Stadium: Carrow Road; Attendance: 750 estimated

6 February 2018	AFC Bournemouth	6–0	Bury	Boscombe
13:00	Anthony 19', 27'; Arter 25'; Taylor 28'; Ndjoli 68'; Hyndman 77'			Stadium: Dean Court

9 February 2018	Norwich City	0–2	Wolverhampton Wanderers	Burton upon Trent
19:00			Gonçalves 30'; Heredia 84'	Stadium: St George's Park National Football Centre

20 February 2018	Bury	1–1	AFC Bournemouth	Bury
13:00	Hatton 82'		Nippard 20'	Stadium: Gigg Lane

23 February 2018	Wolverhampton Wanderers	3–1	Bury	Compton
13:00	Seedorf 56'; Ashley-Seal 69'; Randall 72'		De Girolamo 46'	Stadium: Sir Jack Hayward Training Ground

26 February 2018	Norwich City	1–0	Bury	Norwich
12:30	Wallis 85'			Stadium: Lotus Training Centre

26 February 2018	AFC Bournemouth	5–1	Wolverhampton Wanderers	Boscombe
19:00	Taylor 3'; Pugh 22'; Mousset 27'; Smith 42'; Anthony 89'		Gonçalves 84'	Stadium: Dean Court

=== Group D ===
Team	Pld	W	D	L	GF	GA	GD	Pts
Newcastle United	6	4	1	1	19	9	+10	13
Swansea City	6	3	1	2	14	13	+1	10
Burnley	6	3	0	3	10	11	−1	9
Colchester United	6	1	0	5	8	18	−10	3

Updated to match(es) played on 26 February 2018. Source:

29 September 2017	Newcastle United	3–4	Burnley	Newcastle
13:00	McNall 21', 68'; Sangare 83'	Report	Limb 77'; N'Guessan 80'; Metz 82'; Nabi 86'	Stadium: Northumberland Football Association Headquarters; Attendance: 126

2 November 2017	Burnley	4–0	Colchester United	Ashton-under-Lyne
19:00	Wells 7', 34', 45+1' (pen.); Chakwana 40'			Stadium: Tameside Stadium

29 November 2017	Newcastle United	6–3	Swansea City	Newcastle
13:00	Colback 11'; Roberts 12'; Heardman 41', 44', 58', 70'	Report	Cullen 26', 64'; Marić 81'	Stadium: Northumberland Football Association Headquarters; Attendance: 50

4 December 2017	Colchester United	1–2	Newcastle United	Colchester
19:00	Issa 47'		Charman 44', 66'	Stadium: Colchester Community Stadium

7 December 2017	Swansea City	5–1	Colchester United	Landore
19:00	Marić 14'; McBurnie 19', 58'; Baker-Richardson 65'; James 84'		Wright 45+1'	Stadium: Landore Training Centre

18 January 2018	Burnley	0–4	Newcastle United	Stockport
14:00		Report	Charman 22', 49'; Barlaser 24', 66'	Stadium: Edgeley Park; Attendance: 130 estimated

22 January 2018	Swansea City	0–2	Burnley	Landore
13:00			McNeil 20'; Massanka 28'	Stadium: Landore Training Centre

25 January 2018	Colchester United	3–4	Swansea City	Colchester
19:00	Sheriff 40'; Rooney 61'; Warde 79'		Baker-Richardson 14', 20'; Rooney 56' (o.g.); Gorré 80'	Stadium: Colchester Community Stadium

9 February 2018	Colchester United	3–0	Burnley	Colchester
19:00	Sheriff 34', 62'; Wright 82'			Stadium: Colchester Community Stadium

12 February 2018	Swansea City	1–1	Newcastle United	Landore
13:00	Biabi 56'	Report	Bailey 86'	Stadium: Landore Training Centre; Attendance: 100 estimated

26 February 2018	Newcastle United	3–0	Colchester United	Newcastle
13:00	Charman 7', 10'; Sangare 49'			Stadium: Northumberland Football Association Headquarters; Attendance: 109

26 February 2018	Burnley	0–1	Swansea City	Ashton-under-Lyne
14:00			Gorré 37'	Stadium: Tameside Stadium

=== Group E ===
Team	Pld	W	D	L	GF	GA	GD	Pts
Aston Villa	6	5	0	1	14	3	+11	15
Sheffield United	6	3	0	3	5	5	0	9
Ipswich Town	6	3	0	3	7	10	−3	9
West Bromwich Albion	6	1	0	5	5	13	−8	3

Updated to match(es) played on 14 March 2018. Source:

29 September 2017	Sheffield United	0–1	Ipswich Town	Sheffield
15:00			Folami 47'	Stadium: Bramall Lane

29 September 2017	Aston Villa	3–1	West Bromwich Albion	Hednesford
19:00	Suliman 67'; Lyden 73'; McKirdy 81'		Bradley 5'	Stadium: Keys Park

2 November 2017	West Bromwich Albion	0–1	Sheffield United	Kidderminster
19:00			Thomas 86'	Stadium: Aggborough Stadium

6 November 2017	Ipswich Town	2–1	Aston Villa	Ipswich
19:00	McKendry 3'; Woolfenden 88'		Knibbs 42'	Stadium: Portman Road

11 January 2018	Aston Villa	3–0	Sheffield United	Hednesford
19:00	Knibbs 52'; Clarke 73'; Cox 80'			Stadium: Keys Park

22 January 2018	West Bromwich Albion	0–3	Aston Villa	Walsall
19:00			Green 20', 71'; O'Hare 25' (pen.)	Stadium: Bescot Stadium

22 January 2018	Ipswich Town	0–2	Sheffield United	Ipswich
19:00			Hallam 12'; Smith 33'	Stadium: Portman Road

25 January 2018	West Bromwich Albion	2–1	Ipswich Town	Burton upon Trent
19:00	Bradley 30'; Harper 44'		McLoughlin 73'	Stadium: St George's Park National Football Centre

15 February 2018	Sheffield United	2–0	West Bromwich Albion	Stocksbridge
14:00	Smith 11', 41'			Stadium: Bracken Moor Ground

22 February 2018	Aston Villa	3–0	Ipswich Town	Hednesford
19:00	Knibbs 19'; Odutayo 80'; Ramsey 90+1'			Stadium: Keys Park

26 February 2018	Ipswich Town	3–2	West Bromwich Albion	Ipswich
14:00	Drinan 46', 90'; Morris 57'		Field 53' (pen.); Soule 78'	Stadium: Portman Road

14 March 2018	Sheffield United	0–1	Aston Villa	Stocksbridge
14:00		Report	Odutayo 8'	Stadium: Bracken Moor Ground

=== Group F ===
Team	Pld	W	D	L	GF	GA	GD	Pts
Leicester City	6	4	2	0	15	5	+10	14
Everton	6	3	1	2	8	5	+3	10
Portsmouth	6	1	2	3	4	8	−4	5
Barnsley	6	1	1	4	4	13	−9	4

Updated to match(es) played on 26 February 2018. Source:

9 October 2017	Portsmouth	1–2	Everton	Havant
19:00	Widdrington 76' (pen.)	Report	Broadhead 72'; Lavery 89'	Stadium: West Leigh Park; Referee: Adrian Quelch

10 October 2017	Barnsley	1–3	Leicester City	Barnsley
14:00	Wolfe 29'		Muskwe 22', 84'; Gordon 31'	Stadium: Oakwell

13 November 2017	Leicester City	0–0	Portsmouth	Whetstone
19:00		Report		Stadium: Holmes Park; Attendance: 260; Referee: Peter Gibbons

29 November 2017	Portsmouth	0–1	Barnsley	Havant
14:00		Report	Brown 89'	Stadium: West Leigh Park; Referee: Adam Penwell

1 December 2017	Everton	1–2	Leicester City	Southport
19:00	Feeney 55'		Hornby 6' (o.g.); Eppiah 58'	Stadium: Haig Avenue

21 December 2017	Leicester City	7–1	Barnsley	Whetstone
14:00	Johnson 7'; Hughes 11', 14'; Ndukwu 38'; Wardle 56' (o.g.); Gordon 60'; Choudhury 88'		Brown 5'	Stadium: Holmes Park; Attendance: 209

15 January 2018	Barnsley	1–2	Portsmouth	Barnsley
14:00	Palmer 38'		Smith 88'; Lethbridge 90+1'	Stadium: Oakwell

23 January 2018	Everton	3–0	Portsmouth	Walton
19:00	Broadhead 32'; Sambou 48', 68'			Stadium: Goodison Park; Attendance: 400

6 February 2018	Portsmouth	1–1	Leicester City	Bognor Regis
19:00	Maloney 70'	Report	Eppiah 86'	Stadium: Nyewood Lane; Referee: Adam Penwell

9 February 2018	Everton	0–0	Barnsley	Southport
19:00				Stadium: Haig Avenue

12 February 2018	Barnsley	0–1	Everton	Barnsley
14:00			Evans 70'	Stadium: Oakwell

26 February 2018	Leicester City	2–1	Everton	Whetstone
14:00	Edwards-John 86'; Choudhury 89' (pen.)		Denny 71'	Stadium: Holmes Park; Attendance: 286

=== Group G ===
Team	Pld	W	D	L	GF	GA	GD	Pts
Bristol City	6	4	1	1	10	12	−2	13
Liverpool	6	3	1	2	19	7	+12	10
Stoke City	6	2	1	3	11	14	−3	7
Charlton Athletic	6	1	1	4	4	11	−7	4

Updated to match(es) played on 7 March 2018. Source:

29 September 2017	Bristol City	3–1	Stoke City	Weston-super-Mare
19:00	Bakinson 38'; Holden 45'; Garita 47'		Jarvis 55'	Stadium: Woodspring Stadium

29 September 2017	Charlton Athletic	1–1	Liverpool	Charlton
19:00	Anderson 16'		Wilson 42'	Stadium: The Valley

3 November 2017	Stoke City	3–0	Charlton Athletic	Burton upon Trent
19:00	Campbell 10', 90'; Wara 26'			Stadium: St George's Park National Football Centre

5 November 2017	Liverpool	7–0	Bristol City	Chester
19:00	Ings 1', 17', 21', 68'; Dhanda 33'; Masterson 73'; Wilson 88'			Stadium: Swansway Stadium

3 December 2017	Liverpool	3–4	Stoke City	Chester
13:00	Jones 8'; Ings 56', 90' (pen.)	Report	Ngoy 4'; Campbell 26'; Shenton 39'; Jarvis 69'	Stadium: Swansway Stadium; Attendance: 260

4 December 2017	Charlton Athletic	0–1	Bristol City	Eltham
14:00			Smith 32'	Stadium: DGS Marine Stadium

19 January 2018	Stoke City	3–3	Bristol City	Burton upon Trent
19:00	Campbell 6', 19'; Ayoola 53'		Hinds 32'; Holden 86'; Andrews 90' (pen.)	Stadium: St George's Park National Football Centre

21 January 2018	Liverpool	4–1	Charlton Athletic	Chester
19:00	Adekanye 20', 40'; Gomes 51'; Wilson 53'		Yamfam 45+3'	Stadium: Swansway Stadium

12 February 2018	Charlton Athletic	1–0	Stoke City	Charlton
19:00	Hackett-Fairchild 20'			Stadium: Charlton Athletic Training Ground

13 February 2018	Bristol City	1–0	Liverpool	Bristol
19:00	Edwards 30'			Stadium: Ashton Gate

25 February 2018	Stoke City	0–4	Liverpool	Burton upon Trent
19:00		Report	Solanke 26', 40', 67'; Adekenye 84'	Stadium: St George's Park National Football Centre; Attendance: 121

7 March 2018	Bristol City	2–1	Charlton Athletic	Bristol
19:00	Woodrow 15'; Edwards 77'		Doughty 35'	Stadium: Bristol City Training Ground

=== Group H ===
Team	Pld	W	D	L	GF	GA	GD	Pts
Exeter City	6	3	2	1	11	5	+6	11
Brighton & Hove Albion	6	3	1	2	15	9	+6	10
Sunderland	6	2	1	3	7	12	−5	7
Hull City	6	1	2	3	5	12	−7	5

Updated to match(es) played on 26 February 2018. Source:

29 September 2017	Sunderland	0–5	Brighton & Hove Albion	Hetton-le-Hole
19:00		Report	Sanders 19', 23'; Alzate 45', 49'; Tilley 75'	Stadium: Eppleton Colliery Welfare Ground; Attendance: 149; Referee: Matt Donohue

23 October 2017	Hull City	0–2	Exeter City	North Ferriby
19:00			McAlinden 15'; Jay 48'	Stadium: Dransfield Stadium

2 November 2017	Sunderland	2–1	Exeter City	Hetton-le-Hole
19:00	Embleton 37'; Molyneux 58'		McAlinden 85'	Stadium: Eppleton Colliery Welfare Ground

3 November 2017	Brighton & Hove Albion	2–3	Hull City	Lancing
19:00	Connolly 27'; Baldock 56'		Hinchliffe 2'; Powell 41'; Lewis-Potter 81'	Stadium: Elite Football Performance Centre

30 November 2017	Hull City	0–3	Sunderland	North Ferriby
19:00			Nelson 10'; Greenwood 48', 67'	Stadium: Dransfield Stadium

4 December 2017	Exeter City	4–1	Brighton & Hove Albion	Exeter
19:00	Jay 15', 82'; Hornby-Forbes 56' (o.g.); Egan 78'		Bjørdal 40'	Stadium: St James Park

19 January 2018	Brighton & Hove Albion	3–1	Sunderland	Lancing
19:00	Skalák 17'; Gyökeres 45+2'; Robson 56' (o.g.)		Embleton 66' (pen.)	Stadium: Elite Football Performance Centre

22 January 2018	Exeter City	1–1	Hull City	Exeter
19:00	K. Edwards 3'	Report	L. Edwards 21'	Stadium: St James Park; Attendance: 231

9 February 2018	Hull City	0–3	Brighton & Hove Albion	North Ferriby
19:00			Cox 51' (pen.); Alzate 68'; Connolly 90+1' (pen.)	Stadium: Dransfield Stadium

11 February 2018	Exeter City	2–0	Sunderland	Exeter
19:00	Loft 64'; Byrne 73'			Stadium: St James Park; Attendance: 299

23 February 2018	Sunderland	1–1	Hull City	Hetton-le-Hole
19:00	Molyneux 84'		Lewis-Potter 55'	Stadium: Eppleton Colliery Welfare Ground; Attendance: 173

26 February 2018	Brighton & Hove Albion	1–1	Exeter City	Lancing
19:00	Bjørdal 90+4'		Sparkes 61'	Stadium: Elite Football Performance Centre

== Knockout stages ==
=== Round of 16 ===
16 March 2018	Newcastle United	3–2	AFC Bournemouth	Newcastle
13:00	Gillesphey 47'; Charman 55', 78'	Report	Ofoborh 33'; Ndjoli 52'	Stadium: Northumberland Football Association Headquarters; Attendance: 30

16 March 2018	Southampton	0–4	Leicester City	Marchwood
19:00		Report	Gordon 11'; Hughes 45'; Dewsbury-Hall 59'; Thomas 90'	Stadium: Staplewood Campus; Attendance: 110

16 March 2018	Aston Villa	2–0	Blackburn Rovers	Aston
19:00	Mooney 1'; O'Hare 81'			Stadium: Villa Park

17 March 2018	Brighton & Hove Albion	3–0	Everton	Lancing
13:00	Skalák 28'; Connolly 35'; Gyökeres 86'			Stadium: Elite Football Performance Centre

21 March 2018	Wolverhampton Wanderers	1–1 (a.e.t.) (3–1 p)	Exeter City	Compton
14:30	Yang 74'		Simpson 18'	Stadium: Sir Jack Hayward Training Ground
	Penalties
	Ashley-Seal (penalty scored); Levingston (penalty missed); Hanne (penalty scored); Breslin (penalty scored)		(penalty scored) Jay; (penalty missed) Simpson; (penalty missed) Dean; (penalty missed) Seymour

21 March 2018	Middlesbrough	3–1	Liverpool	Bishop Auckland
19:00	Curry 1', 57'; Brewitt 37'	Report	Virtue-Thick 64'	Stadium: Heritage Park; Attendance: 384

27 March 2018	Sheffield United	2–1 (a.e.t.)	Derby County	Stocksbridge
19:00	Oure 85'; Parkhouse 102'		Walker 30'	Stadium: Bracken Moor Ground

29 March 2018	Swansea City	4–2	Bristol City	Landore
14:00	Biabi 44', 48'; Gorré 45+4'; Marić 68'		Cabango 82' (o.g.); Allen 85'	Stadium: Landore Training Centre

=== Quarter–final ===
6 April 2018	Swansea City	1–1 (a.e.t.) (9–8 p)	Brighton & Hove Albion	Landore
19:00	James 46'		Gyökeres 33'	Stadium: Landore Training Centre
	Penalties
	Biabi (penalty scored); Byers (penalty scored); Lewis (penalty scored); Gorré (penalty scored); James (penalty scored); Cullen (penalty scored); Evans (penalty scored); Blake (penalty scored); Harries (penalty scored)		(penalty scored) Sanders; (penalty scored) Mandroiu; (penalty scored) Cox; (penalty scored) Alzate; (penalty scored) Connolly; (penalty scored) Gyökeres; (penalty scored) Dallison; (penalty scored) Moore; (penalty missed) Barclay

6 April 2018	Sheffield United	2–1 (a.e.t.)	Newcastle United	Stocksbridge
19:00	Smith 3', 77'	Report	Fernández 65'	Stadium: Bracken Moor Ground; Attendance: 300 estimated

9 April 2018	Middlesbrough	1–2 (a.e.t.)	Aston Villa	Bishop Auckland
19:00	Liddle 16' (pen.)		Hepburn-Murphy 90+5', 105'	Stadium: Heritage Park; Attendance: 242

9 April 2018	Leicester City	2–0	Wolverhampton Wanderers	Whetstone
19:00	Martis 18'; Barnes 68'			Stadium: Holmes Park; Attendance: 293

=== Semi–final ===
27 April 2018	Leicester City	2–3 (a.e.t.)	Aston Villa	Leicester
19:00	Benalouane 78'; Thomas 111'		Clarke 74'; Hepburn-Murphy 94', 108'	Stadium: King Power Stadium; Attendance: 1,134; Referee: Joe Hull

27 April 2018	Swansea City	3–0	Sheffield United	Landore
19:00	Marić 5'; Byers 23'; Gorré 90'			Stadium: Landore Training Centre

=== Final ===
4 May 2018
19:00

Swansea City	0–0 (a.e.t.)	Aston Villa
	Report
Penalties
Byers (penalty missed); Lewis (penalty scored); Evans (penalty missed)	1–4	(penalty scored) Lyden; (penalty scored) Mooney; (penalty scored) Hepburn-Murphy; (penalty scored) Clarke

Liberty Stadium, Swansea

Note: Flags indicate national team as defined under FIFA eligibility rules; some limited exceptions apply. Players may hold more than one non-FIFA nationality.

Swansea City
No.	Pos.	Nation	Player
1	GK	GER	Steven Benda
2	DF	WAL	Aaron Lewis
3	DF	WAL	Matthew Blake
4	MF	WAL	Jack Evans
5	DF	WAL	Cian Harries
6	DF	WAL	Ben Cabango
7	MF	WAL	Daniel James
8	MF	SWE	Adnan Marić
9	FW	SCO	Botti Biabi
10	MF	SCO	George Byers
11	FW	CUW	Kenji Gorré
Substitutes:
12	MF	WAL	Kieran Evans
13	GK	SLO	Gregor Zabret
14	MF	ROU	Marco Dulca
15	FW	ENG	Courtney Baker-Richardson
16	DF	WAL	Keston Davies
Coach: (Wales) Cameron Toshack

Aston Villa
No.	Pos.	Nation	Player
1	GK	MNE	Matija Sarkic
2	DF	ENG	Isaiah Bazeley-Graham
3	DF	AUS	Jordan Lyden
4	DF	ENG	Dominic Revan
5	DF	WAL	Mitch Clark
6	MF	IRL	Jake Doyle-Hayes
7	MF	IRL	Jack Clarke
8	MF	ENG	Corey Blackett-Taylor
9	FW	ENG	Andre Green
10	MF	ENG	Callum O'Hare
11	FW	ENG	Rushian Hepburn-Murphy
Substitutes:
12	GK	SWE	Viktor Johansson
13	DF	ENG	Oscar Borg
14	MF	ENG	Alex Prosser
15	MF	ENG	Jordan Cox
16	FW	ENG	Kelsey Mooney
Coach: (Wales) Mark Delaney

== See also ==
- 2017–18 Professional U23 Development League
- 2017–18 FA Youth Cup
