= Cameron Toshack =

Welsh football coach (born 1970)

Personal information
- Full name: Jon Cameron Toshack
- Date of birth: 7 March 1970 (age 56)
- Place of birth: Cardiff, Wales
- Position: Forward

Team information
- Current team: Lion City Sailors (Assistant Coach)

Senior career*
Years	Team	Apps	(Gls)
1988–1989	Swansea City	0	(0)
1989–1991	Bristol City	0	(0)
1991–1992	Cardiff City	5	(0)
1992–1993	Weymouth	6	(1)

Managerial career
- 2011–2012: Macedonia (assistant)
- 2013–2014: Swansea City U18s and U19s
- 2014–2019: Swansea City U23s
- 2019–2020: Pafos FC
- 2022–2023: Leeds United (assistant)
- 2025–2026: Buriram United (assistant)
- 2026–: Lion City Sailors (assistant)
- * Club domestic league appearances and goals

Jon Cameron Toshack (born 7 March 1970) is a Welsh professional football coach and former player. Toshack served as assistant head coach at Singapore Premier League club Lion City Sailors.

Toshack is the son of former Swansea City, Real Sociedad, Real Madrid and Wales manager John Toshack. After a brief playing career, Toshack began coaching the Macedonia national football team in 2011, alongside his father. He then joined Swansea City as a youth coach, winning the 2017 Premier League Cup, before making his first-team managerial debut with Cyprus club Pafos FC in 2019.

== Playing career ==
Toshack began his career with spells at Swansea City and Bristol City without making an appearance for either side. In February 1991, he joined Cardiff City and made three appearances as a substitute before being handed his first start in a defeat by Wrexham. In 1991, at the age of 21, Toshack was diagnosed with Type 1 Diabetes, meaning the physical demands of professional sport became increasingly challenging. At the end of the 1991–92 season, Toshack was released by the club having made five league appearances. He instead moved into non-League football with Weymouth, scoring the winning goal on his debut on 19 December 1992 during a 2–1 win against Halesowen Town. He made another six appearances for the club, scoring one more goal during a 3–0 victory over Bridport in the Dorset Senior Cup.

== Coaching career ==
=== Macedonia ===
In 2011, Toshack joined his father at Macedonia as assistant manager for their 2012 UEFA Euro qualifying campaign. The team made a notable improvement, rising from 103 to 81 in the FIFA world rankings, underlined by a 0–0 friendly away draw with Portugal.

=== Swansea City ===
On 15 October 2013, Toshack took up a coaching position at Swansea City. While Michael Laudrup was first-team manager, Toshack took the reins of the academy role following the departure of Tony Pennock, and finished with silverware as the Swans were crowned FAW U19 champions.

After a brief spell at Moroccan club Wydad AC with his father in 2016, Toshack returned to Swansea. He began working with the under-23 Development squad, ultimately guiding them to the Premier League 2 Division 2 title in 2017. In the same season, the U23 side competed in the 2016–17 Premier League International Cup, reaching the semi-finals before being beaten 0–1 by eventual cup winners Porto. The U23s then won the Premier League Cup in May 2017. In December 2017, Toshack was appointed assistant to Swansea City first-team caretaker manager Leon Britton following the club's decision to release manager Paul Clement.

In May 2018, Toshack led the Swansea City U23s to a second successive Premier League Cup final. They lost to Aston Villa on penalties after a goalless draw. Under Toshack's stewardship of the U23 squad, several players made the transition to the main squad including Oli McBurnie, Joe Rodon, Daniel James, Connor Roberts, Jay Fulton and George Byers. Toshack was able to make Swansea's U23s highly competitive, gaining three Premier League medals in four years.

=== Pafos FC ===
In December 2019, Toshack was appointed manager of Pafos FC. When he joined, the club had achieved only three wins in 13 games and was battling for survival in the Cypriot First Division. Toshack had just 14 fit players available for his first three matches. He prompted a revival for Pafos, picking up 16 of the 18 points on offer. Before his arrival, the club averaged 0.9 points per game in the 2019–20 league season but, under Toshack, this doubled to 1.8 points. Notable victories included a 2–0 win over APOEL FC, the Cypriot First Division leaders and champions of the last seven seasons. In February 2020, Toshack won the Cypriot First Division's Manager of the Month award. He left the club in October 2020, having claimed the highest win percentage in the club's history.

=== Leeds United ===
On 28 February 2022, Toshack was appointed assistant coach to Jesse Marsch at Leeds United, the first member of staff appointed following the sacking of Marcelo Bielsa.

=== Moving to Asia ===
In October 2025, Toshack reunited with former Leeds United assistant coach Mark Jackson who also work under Jesse Marsch at Leeds United where Toshack would join Jackson as his assistant coach at Thai League 1 club Buriram United. Later in September 2026, Toshack would then move to Singapore Premier League club Lion City Sailors joining Jackson as his assistant coach at the club.

== Qualifications ==
Toshack holds a UEFA Pro Licence and UEFA A Youth Licence. He attended the University of Wales where he gained a BSc Psychology degree. Toshack was the first Swansea City coach to graduate from the Premier League's Elite Coach Apprenticeship Scheme (ECAS).

== Honours ==
Swansea City youth

- FAW Welsh Youth Cup: 2014, 2015
- Premier League Cup runner-up: 2018

Individual

- Cypriot First Division's Manager of the Month award in February 2020
