= St Edmund's Catholic Academy =

Location
- Compton Park, Compton Road West; Wolverhampton, West Midlands, WV3 9DU; England
- Coordinates: 52.5903°N 2.1619°W

Information
- Type: Academy
- Motto: "To Love and Serve the Lord"
- Religious affiliation: Roman Catholic
- Established: 1971
- Department for Education URN: 139891 Tables
- Principal: M Hazeldine
- Gender: Coeducational
- Age: 11 to 19
- Website: http://www.stedmunds.org/

St Edmund's Catholic Academy is a Roman Catholic secondary school and sixth form with academy status located in the Compton area of Wolverhampton, West Midlands England. The Building Schools for the Future program invested £7.9 million of its £300 million budget into improving the school. A further £5 million was contributed by Wolverhampton Wanderers Football Club and Redrow Homes, which used parts of the site to create a training ground and new homes, respectively. The new school building was completed in September 2013.

The name of the school comes from the influence of St. Edmund Campion (1540 – 1581), an English Jesuit priest and martyr. Its motto is "To Love and Serve the Lord".

== Consortium ==
St. Edmund's is in a consortium with both St Peter's Collegiate Academy and Wolverhampton Girls' High School. St. Edmund's has links with its feeder schools:

St. Anthony's (in Fordhouses)
St. Bernadette’s (in Wombourne)
St. Christopher’s (in Codsall in Staffordshire)
SS Peter and Paul
SS. Mary & John’s
St. Michael’s (in Penn)
St. Teresa’s (in Parkfields)

== Notable former pupils ==
- Kristian Thomas, gymnast
