= 2018–19 Swansea City A.F.C. season =

Swansea City
2018–19 season
- Chairman: Huw Jenkins (until February 2019); Trevor Birch
- Manager: Graham Potter
- Stadium: Liberty Stadium
- Championship: 10th
- FA Cup: Quarter-finals (vs. Manchester City)
- EFL Cup: Second round (vs. Crystal Palace)
- Top goalscorer: League: Oli McBurnie (22 goals); All: Oli McBurnie (24 goals)
- Highest home attendance: 20,860 vs. Leeds United (21 August 2018, Championship)
- Lowest home attendance: 17,197 vs. Brentford (2 April 2019, Championship)
- Average home league attendance: 18,444
- Biggest win: 3–0 vs. QPR (29 Sep 2018, Championship)
- Biggest defeat: 0–4 vs. QPR (13 Apr 2019, Championship)
Home colours	Away colours	Third colours

The 2018–19 season was Swansea City's 99th season in the English football league system, and their first season back in the Championship since 2010–11 following relegation from the Premier League in the previous season. Along with competing in the Championship, the club would compete in the FA Cup and EFL Cup. The season covered the period from 1 July 2018 to 30 June 2019.

== Club ==
=== First-team staff ===
Last updated on 29 June 2018

Position	Name
Manager	(England) Graham Potter
Assistant manager	(Scotland) Billy Reid
Assistant coaches	(Wales) Alan Curtis
Assistant coaches	(Sweden) Björn Hamberg
Goalkeeping coach	(Wales) Adrian Tucker
Head of recruitment	(Scotland) Kyle Macaulay

=== First-team squad ===
As of 30 August 2018

Note: Flags indicate national team as defined under FIFA eligibility rules; some limited exceptions apply. Players may hold more than one non-FIFA nationality.

No.	Pos.	Nation	Player
1	GK	SWE	Kristoffer Nordfeldt
3	DF	SWE	Martin Olsson
5	DF	NED	Mike van der Hoorn (vice-captain)
8	MF	NED	Leroy Fer (captain)
9	FW	SCO	Oli McBurnie
10	MF	KOS	Bersant Celina
11	MF	NED	Luciano Narsingh
12	MF	ENG	Nathan Dyer
13	GK	GER	Steven Benda
15	MF	ENG	Wayne Routledge
16	FW	SWE	Joel Asoro
17	DF	USA	Cameron Carter-Vickers (on loan from Tottenham Hotspur)

No.	Pos.	Nation	Player
19	MF	SCO	Barrie McKay
20	MF	WAL	Daniel James
21	MF	ENG	Matt Grimes
22	DF	WAL	Joe Rodon
23	DF	WAL	Connor Roberts
24	DF	WAL	Declan John
25	GK	NED	Erwin Mulder
26	DF	ENG	Kyle Naughton
27	MF	SCO	Jay Fulton
28	MF	SCO	George Byers
30	MF	ENG	Yan Dhanda
46	FW	ENG	Courtney Baker-Richardson

== Transfers ==
=== Transfers in ===
Date	Position	Nationality	Name	From	Contract length	Fee	Ref.
23 May 2018	MF	(England)	Yan Dhanda	Liverpool	2 years	Free transfer	
6 July 2018	DF	(Ecuador)	Jordi Govea	Real Madrid	3 years	Free transfer	
14 July 2018	FW	(Sweden)	Joel Asoro	Sunderland	4 years	£2,000,000	
31 July 2018	MF	(Scotland)	Barrie McKay	Nottingham Forest	3 years	£1,500,000	
31 July 2018	MF	(Kosovo)	Bersant Celina	Manchester City	4 years	£3,000,000	
9 August 2018	DF	(Wales)	Declan John	Rangers	3 years	Undisclosed	
13 August 2018	MF	(Belgium)	Simon Paulet	Club Brugge	2 years	Undisclosed	
20 August 2018	GK	(England)	Josh Gould	Taff's Well	1 year	Free transfer	

=== Transfers out ===
Date	Position	Nationality	Name	To	Fee	Ref.
10 May 2018	DF	(Spain)	Àngel Rangel	Queens Park Rangers	End of contract	
11 May 2018	MF	(England)	Leon Britton	Retired	—N/a	
22 May 2018	DF	(Slovenia)	Matic Paljk	Olimpija Ljubljana	End of contract	
22 May 2018	DF	(Wales)	Mael Davies	Free agent	End of contract	
22 May 2018	FW	(Portugal)	Causso Darame	Free agent	End of contract	
22 May 2018	MF	(Wales)	Jack Fox	Free agent	End of contract	
22 May 2018	MF	(Wales)	Finley Hazell	Free agent	End of contract	
22 May 2018	FW	(Canada)	Matthew Roberts	Free agent	End of contract	
22 May 2018	DF	(Wales)	Rhydian Williams	Free agent	End of contract	
18 June 2018	GK	(Wales)	Lewis Thomas	Forest Green Rovers	Free transfer	
20 June 2018	GK	(Poland)	Łukasz Fabiański	West Ham United	£7,000,000	
26 June 2018	FW	(Netherlands)	Kenji Gorré	Nacional	Free transfer	
27 June 2018	MF	(Spain)	Roque Mesa	Sevilla	£8,000,000	
29 June 2018	MF	(South Korea)	Ki Sung-yueng	Newcastle United	Free transfer	
9 July 2018	GK	(Wales)	Alex Lang	Cardiff Metropolitan	Free transfer	
16 July 2018	DF	(England)	Kyle Bartley	West Bromwich Albion	£4,000,000	
2 August 2018	DF	(England)	Alfie Mawson	Fulham	£15,000,000	
9 August 2018	DF	(Spain)	Jordi Amat	Rayo Vallecano	£1,000,000	
9 August 2018	MF	(England)	Sam Clucas	Stoke City	£6,000,000	
9 August 2018	DF	(Argentina)	Federico Fernández	Newcastle United	£6,000,000	

=== Loans in ===
Date from	Position	Nationality	Name	From	Expiry date	Ref.
25 August 2018	DF	(United States)	Cameron Carter-Vickers	Tottenham Hotspur	31 May 2019	

=== Loans out ===
Start date	Position	Nationality	Name	To	Expiry date	Ref.
12 June 2018	DF	(Wales)	Ben Cabango	The New Saints	3 January 2019	
2 July 2018	MF	(Scotland)	Adam King	Peterborough United	19 January 2019	
16 July 2018	FW	(Spain)	Borja Bastón	Deportivo Alavés	31 May 2019	
25 July 2018	FW	(Ghana)	André Ayew	Fenerbahçe	31 May 2019	
9 August 2018	FW	(Ghana)	Jordan Ayew	Crystal Palace	31 May 2019	
31 August 2018	DF	(Wales)	Keston Davies	Notts County	3 January 2019	
30 November 2018	GK	(Wales)	Joshua Gould	Merthyr Town	28 December 2018	
3 January 2019	DF	(Wales)	Aaron Lewis	Doncaster Rovers	31 May 2019	
31 January 2019	FW	(Scotland)	Botti Biabi	Macclesfield Town	31 May 2019	
31 January 2019	FW	(Ivory Coast)	Wilfried Bony	Al-Arabi	31 May 2019	
31 January 2019	MF	(England)	Tom Carroll	Aston Villa	31 May 2019	
31 January 2019	MF	(Ecuador)	Jefferson Montero	West Bromwich Albion	31 May 2019	
1 February 2019	MF	(Scotland)	Ryan Blair	Dunfermline Athletic	31 May 2019	

=== New contracts ===
Date signed	Position	Nationality	Name	Contract length	Expiry date	Ref.
3 July 2018	MF	(Scotland)	George Byers	2 years	30 June 2020	
4 July 2018	MF	(Wales)	Keiran Evans	1 year	30 June 2019	
7 July 2018	MF	(Wales)	Jack Evans	1 year	30 June 2019	
12 July 2018	FW	(Scotland)	Oli McBurnie	3 years	30 June 2021	
15 July 2018	DF	(Wales)	Aaron Lewis	1 year	30 June 2019	
1 November 2018	DF	(Wales)	Joe Rodon	3.5 years	30 June 2022	
6 November 2018	MF	(Scotland)	Jay Fulton	2.5 years	30 June 2021	
7 November 2018	MF	(England)	Matt Grimes	3.5 years	30 June 2022	
22 November 2018	DF	(Wales)	Connor Roberts	3.5 years	30 June 2022	
31 January 2019	FW	(Scotland)	Botti Biabi	1 year	30 June 2020	

== Pre-season ==
As of 18 June 2018, Swansea City have confirmed to take part in the Interwetten Cup in Germany against Magdeburg and Genoa before travelling to Austria for a six-day training camp to face Eibar and Freiburg. Prior to the tour Swansea City will face Yeovil Town.

=== Friendlies ===
10 July 2018	Yeovil Town	1–2	Swansea City	Yeovil
19:45 BST	Green 24'	Report	Dhanda 77'; Grimes 90+1'	Stadium: Huish Park

18 July 2018	Swansea City	1–0	Newport County	Swansea
	Narsingh 12'	Report		Stadium: Fairwood Training Ground

24 July 2018	Eibar	2–1	Swansea City	Kufstein, Austria
17:30 BST	Milla 42'; Enrich 51'	Report	Amat 85'	Stadium: Kufstein Arena

27 July 2018	Freiburg	3–0	Swansea City	Imst, Austria
16:00 BST	Kleindienst 6'; Waldschmidt 73'; Petersen 80'	Report		Stadium: Stadium Imst

=== Interwetten Cup ===
21 July 2018	Swansea City	1–1 (3–4 p)	Genoa	Magdeburg, Germany
13:00 BST	McBurnie 60'	Report	Piątek 37'	Stadium: MDCC Arena

21 July 2018	Magdeburg	0–0 (4–2 p)	Swansea City	Magdeburg, Germany
14:15 BST		Report		Stadium: MDCC Arena

== Competitions ==
=== Overview ===
Competition	Record							
Competition	G	W	D	L	GF	GA	GD	Win %
Championship	46	18	11	17	65	62	+3	39.13
FA Cup	4	3	0	1	13	5	+8	75.00
EFL Cup	1	0	0	1	0	1	−1	0.00
Total	51	21	11	19	78	68	+10	41.18

Updated to match played 5 May 2019
Source: Competitions

=== Championship ===
==== League table ====
Pos	Team	Pld	W	D	L	GF	GA	GD	Pts
7	Middlesbrough	46	20	13	13	49	41	+8	73
8	Bristol City	46	19	13	14	59	53	+6	70
9	Nottingham Forest	46	17	15	14	61	54	+7	66
10	Swansea City	46	18	11	17	65	62	+3	65
11	Brentford	46	17	13	16	73	59	+14	64 (Note: Brentford were awarded a 1–0 win over Bolton due to Bolton's inability to hold the fixture.)
12	Sheffield Wednesday	46	16	16	14	60	62	−2	64
13	Hull City	46	17	11	18	66	68	−2	62

Source: Sky Sports Archived 25 September 2019 at the Wayback Machine
Rules for classification: 1) Points; 2) Goal difference; 3) Number of goals scored; 4) Head-to-head results

==== Results summary ====
Overall								Home						Away					
Pld	W	D	L	GF	GA	GD	Pts	W	D	L	GF	GA	GD	W	D	L	GF	GA	GD
46	18	11	17	65	62	+3	65	12	6	5	42	28	+14	6	5	12	23	34	−11

Last updated: 5 May 2019.
Source: 11v11 for league tables

==== Results by matchday ====
Matchday	1	2	3	4	5	6	7	8	9	10	11	12	13	14	15	16	17	18	19	20	21	22	23	24	25	26	27	28	29	30	31	32	33	34	35	36	37	38	39	40	41	42	43	44	45	46
Ground	A	H	A	H	H	A	H	A	A	H	A	H	A	H	H	A	A	H	H	A	A	H	A	H	H	A	A	H	H	A	H	A	A	H	A	A	A	H	H	H	A	H	A	H	H	A
Result	W	W	D	D	L	W	D	L	D	W	D	L	L	W	W	L	W	L	L	L	W	W	L	L	D	W	D	W	D	L	W	L	L	W	L	L	L	W	W	W	L	W	W	D	D	D
Position	7	4	7	6	10	7	6	10	14	7	6	11	15	8	8	9	8	9	11	13	12	9	12	12	13	12	13	9	11	13	11	12	12	13	14	15	15	14	13	13	13	12	10	11	9	10

Updated to match(es) played on 5 May 2019. Source: BBC
A = Away; H = Home; W = Win; D = Draw; L = Loss

==== Matches ====
Win Draw Loss

On 21 June 2018, Swansea City's 2018-2019 Championship fixtures were announced.

4 August 2018 1	Sheffield United	1–2	Swansea City	Sheffield
17:30 BST	Baldock 62'	Report	McBurnie 71'; Dhanda 85'	Stadium: Bramall Lane; Attendance: 24,654; Referee: Jeremy Simpson

11 August 2018 2	Swansea City	1–0	Preston North End	Swansea
15:00 BST	Fulton 32'	Report		Stadium: Liberty Stadium; Attendance: 19,352; Referee: James Linington

17 August 2018 3	Birmingham City	0–0	Swansea City	Birmingham
19:45 BST		Report		Stadium: St Andrew's; Attendance: 20,083; Referee: Darren England

21 August 2018 4	Swansea City	2–2	Leeds United	Swansea
19:45 BST	McBurnie 24', 51'	Report	Roofe 40'; Hernández 79'	Stadium: Liberty Stadium; Attendance: 20,860; Referee: Andy Davies

25 August 2018 5	Swansea City	0–1	Bristol City	Swansea
15:00 BST		Report	Weimann 1'	Stadium: Liberty Stadium; Attendance: 20,522; Referee: Gavin Ward

1 September 2018 6	Millwall	1–2	Swansea City	Bermondsey
17:30 BST	Wallace 62'	Report	Naughton 76'; McBurnie 85'	Stadium: The Den; Attendance: 12,440; Referee: Graham Scott

15 September 2018 7	Swansea City	0–0	Nottingham Forest	Swansea
15:00 BST		Report		Stadium: Liberty Stadium; Attendance: 19,522; Referee: Scott Duncan

18 September 2018 8	Stoke City	1–0	Swansea City	Stoke-on-Trent
19:45 BST	Allen 57'	Report		Stadium: Bet365 Stadium; Attendance: 22,078; Referee: Paul Tierney

22 September 2018 9	Middlesbrough	0–0	Swansea City	Middlesbrough
15:00 BST		Report		Stadium: Riverside Stadium; Attendance: 22,881; Referee: Simon Hooper

29 September 2018 10	Swansea City	3–0	Queens Park Rangers	Swansea
15:00 BST	Baker-Richardson 16'; Roberts 76'; Fulton 83'	Report		Stadium: Liberty Stadium; Attendance: 18,633; Referee: Kevin Friend

2 October 2018 11	Wigan Athletic	0–0	Swansea City	Wigan
19:45 BST		Report		Stadium: DW Stadium; Attendance: 8,964; Referee: John Brooks

6 October 2018 12	Swansea City	2–3	Ipswich Town	Swansea
15:00 BST	Donacien 9' (o.g.); Celina 79'	Report	Edwards 27' van der Hoorn 31' (o.g.); Chalobah 84'	Stadium: Liberty Stadium; Attendance: 18,810; Referee: Oliver Langford

20 October 2018 13	Aston Villa	1–0	Swansea City	Birmingham
15:00 BST	Abraham 8'	Report		Stadium: Villa Park; Attendance: 41,326; Referee: Andrew Madley

23 October 2018 14	Swansea City	3–1	Blackburn Rovers	Swansea
19:45 BST	Raya 64' (o.g.); Roberts 68'; Celina 85'	Report	Mulgrew 26' (pen.)	Stadium: Liberty Stadium; Attendance: 18,035; Referee: Geoff Eltringham

27 October 2018 15	Swansea City	2–0	Reading	Swansea
15:00 BST	McBurnie 36' (pen.), 84'	Report		Stadium: Liberty Stadium; Attendance: 18,785; Referee: Keith Stroud

3 November 2018 16	Rotherham United	2–1	Swansea City	Rotherham
15:00 GMT	Manning 79' (pen.), 87' (pen.)	Report	McBurnie 25'	Stadium: New York Stadium; Attendance: 9,006; Referee: Tony Harrington

10 November 2018 17	Bolton Wanderers	0–1	Swansea City	Bolton
15:00 GMT		Report	McKay 15'	Stadium: University of Bolton Stadium; Attendance: 14,090; Referee: Graham Scott

24 November 2018 18	Swansea City	1–4	Norwich City	Swansea
15:00 GMT	James 41'	Report	van der Hoorn 16' (o.g.); Buendía 24'; Stiepermann 37'; Pukki 60'	Stadium: Liberty Stadium; Attendance: 18,780; Referee: Darren Bond

28 November 2018 19	Swansea City	1–2	West Bromwich Albion	Swansea
19:45 GMT	McBurnie 10'	Report	Dawson 13'; Hegazi 44'	Stadium: Liberty Stadium; Attendance: 17,865; Referee: James Linington

1 December 2018 20	Derby County	2–1	Swansea City	Derby
15:00 GMT	Wilson 30', 40'	Report	Tomori 87' (o.g.)	Stadium: Pride Park Stadium; Attendance: 26,167; Referee: Andy Madley

8 December 2018 21	Brentford	2–3	Swansea City	Brentford
15:00 GMT	Watkins 45'; Benrahma 69'	Report	Routledge 1'; Mepham 22' (o.g.); Fer 27'	Stadium: Griffin Park; Attendance: 9,442; Referee: Andy Woolmer

15 December 2018 22	Swansea City	2–1	Sheffield Wednesday	Swansea
15:00 GMT	Celina 71'; Routledge 72'	Report	Matias 63'	Stadium: Liberty Stadium; Attendance: 18,692; Referee: David Webb

22 December 2018 23	Hull City	3–2	Swansea City	Kingston upon Hull
17:30 GMT	Bowen 70', 80'; Elphick 76'	Report	Bony 3'; Celina 88'	Stadium: KCOM Stadium; Attendance: 10,848; Referee: Oliver Langford

26 December 2018 24	Swansea City	0–1	Aston Villa	Swansea
15:00 GMT		Report	Hourihane 65'	Stadium: Liberty Stadium; Attendance: 20,775; Referee: Roger East

29 December 2018 25	Swansea City	2–2	Wigan Athletic	Swansea
15:00 GMT	Burn 59' (o.g.) van der Hoorn 81'	Report	Garner 10' (pen.), 34'	Stadium: Liberty Stadium; Attendance: 18,591; Referee: James Linington

1 January 2019 26	Reading	1–4	Swansea City	Reading
15:00 GMT	Harriott 77'	Report	McBurnie 2', 48' (pen.); Roberts 30' van der Hoorn 45'	Stadium: Madejski Stadium; Attendance: 15,644; Referee: Tim Robinson

12 January 2019 27	Preston North End	1–1	Swansea City	Preston
15:00 GMT	Johnson 60' (pen.)	Report	Baker-Richardson 55'	Stadium: Deepdale; Attendance: 11,604; Referee: Keith Stroud

19 January 2019 28	Swansea City	1–0	Sheffield United	Swansea
17:30 GMT	McBurnie 65'	Report		Stadium: Liberty Stadium; Attendance: 18,673; Referee: John Brooks

29 January 2019 29	Swansea City	3–3	Birmingham City	Swansea
19:45 GMT	James 22'; McBurnie 65', 90+4'	Report	Maghoma 35'; Mulder 67' (o.g.); Adams 71'	Stadium: Liberty Stadium; Attendance: 18,194; Referee: Stephen Martin

2 February 2019 30	Bristol City	2–0	Swansea City	Bristol
15:00 GMT	Weimann 46'; O'Dowda 74'	Report		Stadium: Ashton Gate Stadium; Attendance: 23,560; Referee: Andy Woolmer

9 February 2019 31	Swansea City	1–0	Millwall	Swansea
15:00 GMT	Byers 43'	Report		Stadium: Liberty Stadium; Attendance: 18,650; Referee: Kevin Friend

13 February 2019 32	Leeds United	2–1	Swansea City	Leeds
19:45 GMT	Jansson 20'; Harrison 34'	Report	McBurnie 87' (pen.)	Stadium: Elland Road; Attendance: 34,044; Referee: David Webb

23 February 2019 33	Sheffield Wednesday	3–1	Swansea City	Owlerton, Sheffield
15:00 GMT	Reach 11', 32'; Fletcher 42'; Matias	Report	McBurnie 69'	Stadium: Hillsborough; Attendance: 22,935; Referee: Geoff Eltringham

2 March 2019 34	Swansea City	2–0	Bolton Wanderers	Swansea
15:00 GMT	McBurnie 80'; Celina 90+2'	Report		Stadium: Liberty Stadium; Attendance: 17,880; Referee: Gavin Ward

8 March 2019 35	Norwich City	1–0	Swansea City	Norwich
19:45 GMT	Buendía 54'	Report		Stadium: Carrow Road; Attendance: 26,360; Referee: Robert Jones

13 March 2019 36	West Bromwich Albion	3–0	Swansea City	West Bromwich
20:00 GMT	Brunt 19'; Holgate 54'; Rodriguez 85'	Report		Stadium: The Hawthorns; Referee: Scott Duncan

30 March 2019 37	Nottingham Forest	2–1	Swansea City	West Bridgford
15:00 GMT	Murphy 80'; Wagué 87'	Report	Roberts 76'	Stadium: City Ground; Attendance: 28,469; Referee: Jeremy Simpson

2 April 2019 38	Swansea City	3–0	Brentford	Swansea
19:45 BST	Dyer 1', 34'; James 78'	Report		Stadium: Liberty Stadium; Attendance: 17,197; Referee: Peter Bankes

6 April 2019 39	Swansea City	3–1	Middlesbrough	Swansea
15:00 BST	Grimes 34' (pen.); Routledge 38'; Roberts 71'	Report	Saville 81'	Stadium: Liberty Stadium; Attendance: 18,171; Referee: Andy Woolmer

9 April 2019 40	Swansea City	3–1	Stoke City	Swansea
19:45 BST	James 23' van der Hoorn 40'; McBurnie 86'	Report	McClean 45+3'	Stadium: Liberty Stadium; Attendance: 17,804; Referee: James Linington

13 April 2019 41	Queens Park Rangers	4–0	Swansea City	Shepherd's Bush
15:00 BST	Furlong 3'; Hemed 5', 17'; Luongo 54'	Report		Stadium: Loftus Road; Attendance: 13,872; Referee: Andrew Madley

19 April 2019 42	Swansea City	4–3	Rotherham United	Swansea
15:00 BST	McBurnie 36', 79'; McKay 50'; Byers 69'	Report	Ihiekwe 10'; Crooks 38'; Vaulks 83'	Stadium: Liberty Stadium; Attendance: 18,527; Referee: Keith Stroud

22 April 2019 43	Ipswich Town	0–1	Swansea City	Ipswich
15:00 BST		Report	Routledge 57'	Stadium: Portman Road; Attendance: 17,247; Referee: Darren England

27 April 2019 44	Swansea City	2–2	Hull City	Swansea
15:00 BST	McBurnie 37', 66'	Report	Bowen 77'; Dicko 84'	Stadium: Liberty Stadium; Attendance: 18,192; Referee: Geoff Eltringham

1 May 2019 45	Swansea City	1–1	Derby County	Swansea
19:45 BST	Routledge 66'	Report	Keogh 21'	Stadium: Liberty Stadium; Attendance: 18,434; Referee: Peter Bankes

5 May 2019 46	Blackburn Rovers	2–2	Swansea City	Blackburn
12:30 BST	Lenihan 21'; Dack 47'	Report	Baker-Richardson 25'; McBurnie 35'	Stadium: Ewood Park; Attendance: 16,227; Referee: Jarred Gillett

=== FA Cup ===
The third round draw was made live on BBC by Ruud Gullit and Paul Ince from Stamford Bridge on 3 December 2018. The fourth round draw was made live on BBC by Robbie Keane and Carl Ikeme from Wolverhampton. The fifth round draw was broadcast on 28 January 2019 live on BBC, Alex Scott and Ian Wright conducted the draw. Draw for the quarter-final was made on 18 February by Darren Fletcher & Wayne Bridge.

Win Draw Loss

5 January 2019 Third round	Aston Villa	0–3	Swansea City	Aston
15:00 GMT		Report	Baker-Richardson 2'; Dyer 47'; Fulton 78'	Stadium: Villa Park; Attendance: 30,572; Referee: Gavin Ward

26 January 2019 Fourth round	Swansea City	4–1	Gillingham	Swansea
15:00 GMT	McBurnie 10', 32'; Celina 73'; McKay 84'	Report	Rees 51'	Stadium: Liberty Stadium; Attendance: 15,080; Referee: Darren England

17 February 2019 Fifth round	Swansea City	4–1	Brentford	Swansea
16:00 GMT	Daniels 49' (o.g.); James 53'; Celina 66'; Byers 90'	Report	Watkins 28'	Stadium: Liberty Stadium; Attendance: 11,261; Referee: Stuart Attwell

16 March 2019 Quarter-finals	Swansea City	2–3	Manchester City	Swansea
17:20 GMT	Grimes 20' (pen.); Celina 29'	Report	B. Silva 69'; Nordfeldt 78' (o.g.); Agüero 88'	Stadium: Liberty Stadium; Attendance: 19,783; Referee: Andre Marriner

=== EFL Cup ===
The second round draw was made from the Stadium of Light on 16 August.

Win Draw Loss

28 August 2018 2nd round	Swansea City	0–1	Crystal Palace	Swansea
19:30 BST		Report	Sørloth 70'	Stadium: Liberty Stadium; Attendance: 9,122; Referee: John Brooks

== Statistics ==
=== Appearances, goals, and cards ===
Last updated on 5 May 2019

No.	Pos	Player	Championship			FA Cup			EFL Cup			Total			Discipline	
No.	Pos	Player	Starts	Sub	Goals	Starts	Sub	Goals	Starts	Sub	Goals	Starts	Sub	Goals	Booked	Sent off (straight red)
1	GK	(Sweden) Kristoffer Nordfeldt	22	0	0	2	0	0	1	0	0	25	0	0	1	–
3	DF	(Sweden) Martin Olsson	13	4	0	–	–	–	–	–	–	13	4	0	2	–
5	DF	(Netherlands) Mike van der Hoorn	46	0	3	4	0	0	–	–	–	50	0	3	6	–
8	MF	(Netherlands) Leroy Fer	15	10	1	2	0	0	–	–	–	17	10	1	5	–
9	FW	(Scotland) Oli McBurnie	37	5	22	2	0	2	–	–	–	39	5	24	5	–
10	MF	(Kosovo) Bersant Celina	33	5	5	4	0	3	–	–	–	37	5	8	2	–
11	MF	(Netherlands) Luciano Narsingh	0	2	0	–	–	–	–	–	–	0	2	0	–	–
12	MF	(England) Nathan Dyer	18	4	2	2	0	1	–	–	–	20	4	3	1	–
15	MF	(England) Wayne Routledge	22	2	5	2	0	0	–	–	–	24	2	5	–	–
16	FW	(Sweden) Joel Asoro	4	10	0	0	2	0	0	1	0	4	13	0	–	–
17	DF	(United States) Cameron Carter-Vickers	23	7	0	3	0	0	–	–	–	26	7	0	4	–
19	MF	(Scotland) Barrie McKay	16	14	2	1	0	1	–	–	–	17	14	3	–	–
20	MF	(Wales) Daniel James	28	5	4	2	2	1	1	0	0	31	7	5	2	–
21	MF	(England) Matt Grimes	40	5	1	3	0	1	1	0	0	44	5	2	3	–
22	DF	(Wales) Joe Rodon	23	4	0	1	0	0	–	–	–	24	4	0	4	–
23	DF	(Wales) Connor Roberts	44	1	5	4	0	0	–	–	–	48	1	5	3	–
24	DF	(Wales) Declan John	7	3	0	1	1	0	1	0	0	9	4	0	–	–
25	GK	(Netherlands) Erwin Mulder	24	1	0	2	0	0	–	–	–	26	1	0	1	–
26	DF	(England) Kyle Naughton	31	4	1	2	0	0	1	0	0	34	4	1	2	–
27	MF	(Scotland) Jay Fulton	21	12	2	2	2	1	–	–	–	23	14	3	2	–
28	MF	(Scotland) George Byers	20	1	2	2	1	1	1	0	0	23	2	3	2	–
30	MF	(England) Yan Dhanda	1	4	1	–	–	–	1	0	0	2	4	1	–	–
32	FW	(Wales) Liam Cullen	–	–	–	–	–	–	0	1	0	0	1	0	–	–
46	FW	(England) Courtney Baker-Richardson	6	11	3	2	1	1	1	0	0	9	12	4	1	1
47	DF	(England) Tyler Reid	–	–	–	–	–	–	0	1	0	0	1	0	–	–
50	DF	(Wales) Cian Harries	2	0	0	0	3	0	1	0	0	3	3	0	–	–
55	DF	(Wales) Brandon Cooper	–	–	–	–	–	–	1	0	0	1	0	0	–	–
Player currently away on loan to another club
2	FW	(Ivory Coast) Wilfried Bony	1	6	1	–	–	–	–	–	–	1	6	1	–	–
7	MF	(Ecuador) Jefferson Montero	0	12	0	–	–	–	–	–	–	0	12	0	1	–
14	MF	(England) Tom Carroll	8	4	0	–	–	–	1	0	0	9	4	0	–	–
Player transferred to another club during the season
—	DF	(Argentina) Federico Fernández	1	0	0	–	–	–	–	–	–	1	0	0	–	–
