= Joseph Vickers de Ville =

English painter

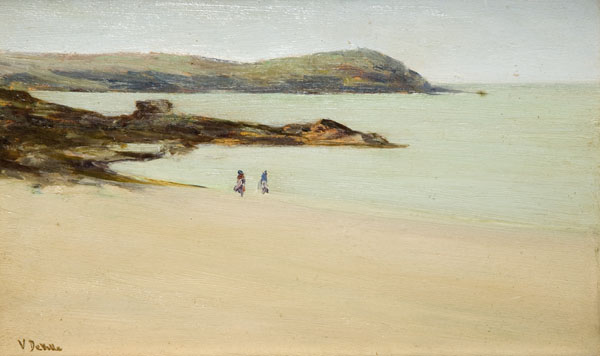
J Vickers de Ville. Coast Scene. c.1905. Wolverhampton Art Gallery

Joseph Vickers de Ville (1856–1925) was an English painter of landscapes and rural subjects.

== Life and work ==
Joseph Vickers de Ville was a son of the farmers Joseph and Mary Deville. He was born in Eaton, Derbyshire, but is considered a Wolverhampton artist, as he moved to Wolverhampton by 1881, together with his widowed mother and brothers Richard and John. In the 1880s, his address was Osborne Cottage, Sweetman Street, Wolverhampton, but later he moved to Compton, a suburb of Wolverhampton.

Vickers de Ville was not professionally trained and did not consider himself a professional artist, however, his artistic gift was recognised and appreciated. In Compton, he maintained a studio in Tettenhall Wood. From 1887, he exhibited at the Royal Academy. Between 1876-1920, sixty eight his works were shown at the Royal Birmingham Society of Artists, a full member of which he was elected in 1917. He also exhibited at the Royal Institute of Oil Painters, Fine Art Society, The Royal Glasgow Institute for the Fine Arts, Royal Scottish Academy, and at the Salons in Paris.

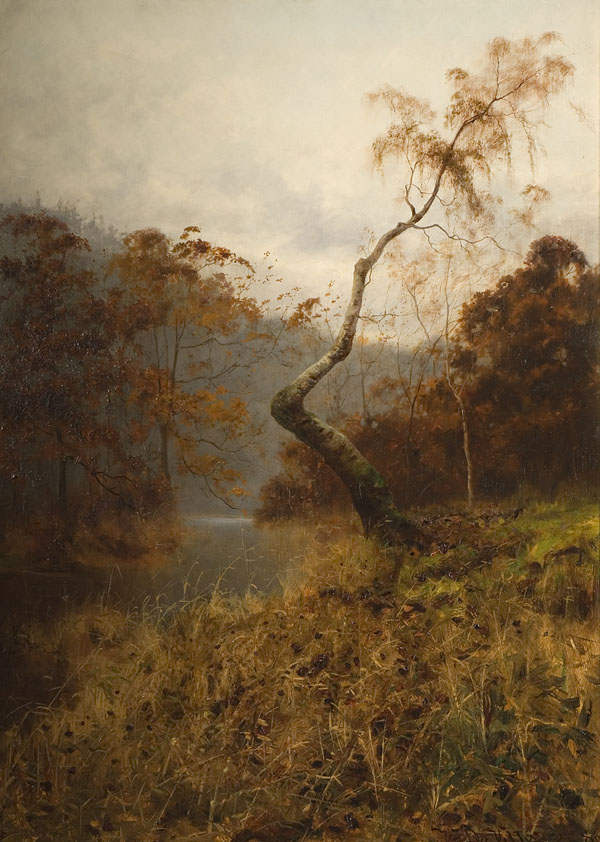
J Vickers de Ville. The Silent Pool (1886; Wolverhampton Art Gallery)

Vickers de Ville worked in both oils and watercolours. His favourite subject was North Wales where "he first obtained his inspiration amid the grand and imposing scenery", with particular inclination to coastal landscapes and streams and rivers, and investigation of light effects in open air. It was noticed that "few can rival him in depicting torrent, rock, river and trees." His landscapes of the Cotswolds, Malvern, Cheshire and Staffordshire are also well known. Often they expressed the mood of melancholy and solitude, like his painting 'The Moonlight' which was to illustrate Beethoven's 'Moonlight Sonata'.

Vickers de Ville's personal exhibition was successfully held at Wolverhampton Art Gallery in 1915. It presented sixty-four paintings and numerous sketches, many of which were loaned by Scottish, Liverpool and London patrons. The exhibition was favourably reviewed and it was particularly mentioned that "a great many of his pictures are in the United States, and others have found owners in France, Germany and South America. Most of them were bought by Americans. The demand from abroad is one of the reasons why Wolverhampton people have been able to see so little of his work." In 1923, there was another exhibition of his drawings.

A number of paintings by Vickers de Ville have been preserved at Wolverhampton Art Gallery. His works also can be found at McLean Museum and Art Gallery, Greenock, Sheffield Museum and Art Gallery and other public and private collections.

Little is known about de Ville's personal life. He married in 1894, and with his wife Mary had at least one child - the son Claude (born in 1895). The 1901 census also shows the daughter Gladys, born in about 1886, which is well before their marriage.

== Bibliography ==
- Algernon Graves, The Royal Academy of Arts. A Complete Dictionary of Contributors. Vol.1
- Morris S. and Morris K. A Catalogue of Birmingham & West Midlands Painters of the Nineteenth Century. 1974.
- Grant M. Waters. Dictionary of British Artists Working 1900-1950. 1975.
