= George Byers (footballer) =

English footballer

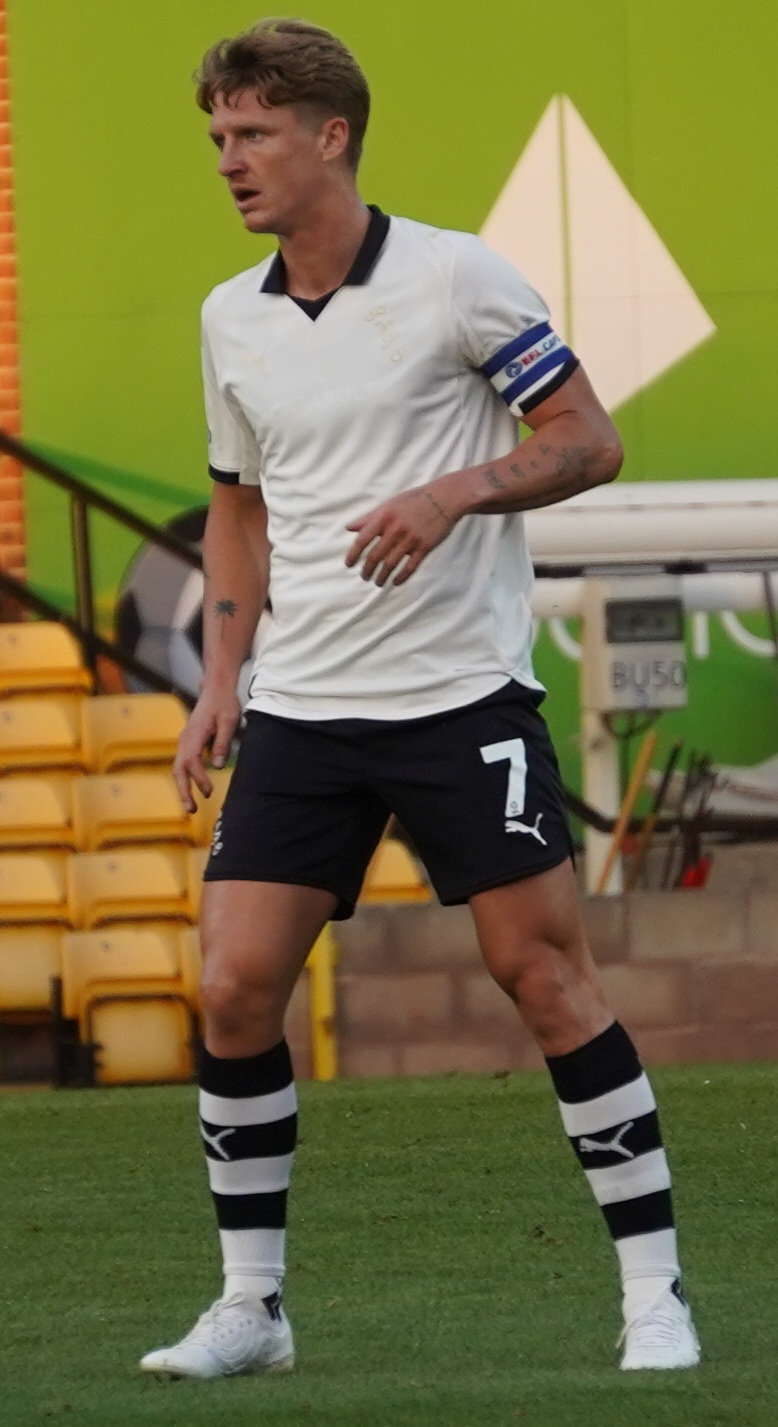
- Byers as Port Vale captain (2025)

Personal information
- Full name: George William Byers
- Date of birth: 29 May 1996 (age 30)
- Place of birth: Ilford, England
- Height: 5 ft 11 in (1.80 m)
- Position: Midfielder

Team information
- Current team: Port Vale
- Number: 7

Youth career
- 2003–2014: Watford

Senior career*
Years	Team	Apps	(Gls)
2014–2016	Watford	1	(0)
2016–2021	Swansea City	56	(4)
2021	→ Portsmouth (loan)	14	(0)
2021–2024	Sheffield Wednesday	68	(13)
2024	→ Blackpool (loan)	16	(0)
2024–	Port Vale	54	(6)

International career
2012	Scotland U16	1	(0)
2012	Scotland U17	3	(0)
- * Club domestic league appearances and goals as of 10:23, 22 November 2026 (UTC)

George William Byers (born 29 May 1996) is a professional footballer who plays as a midfielder for EFL League Two club Port Vale. He is also a vice-captain. Born in England to Scottish parents, he has represented Scotland up to under-17 level.

Byers began his professional career at Watford in May 2014 after having been in the club's academy since age seven. He played one first-team game in January 2015 and moved on to Swansea City in July 2016. Initially with the under-23 team, he won the Professional Development League League 1 Division 2 and Premier League Cup in 2016–17 and was named as Under-23s Player of the Season in 2017–18. He went on to play 56 Championship matches for Swansea, though he ended the 2020–21 season on loan at Portsmouth in League One. He signed with Sheffield Wednesday in August 2021 and played 24 League One games in the club's 2022–23 promotion campaign. He spent the second half of the 2023–24 season loan at Blackpool. He joined League Two club Port Vale in July 2024 and was promoted out of League Two with the club at the end of the 2024–25 season.

== Early life ==
George William Byers was born in Ilford on 29 May 1996. His family originally came from Glasgow and supported Rangers, and his father had previously worked in the club shop at Ibrox Stadium. He remained a keen Rangers fan growing up in Essex. As a young child he played Sunday league football with Redbridge.

== Club career ==
=== Watford ===
Byers is a youth product of the Watford Academy, joining the club at age seven. He had previously trained with Arsenal and Tottenham Hotspur. Manager Gianfranco Zola took him on a pre-season trip to Italy with the first-team in 2013. In May 2014, Byers signed a professional (two-year) deal with Watford. On 17 January 2015, he made his senior debut as a substitute in a 5–0 win over Charlton Athletic at Vicarage Road. Manager Slaviša Jokanović said that "he is still young but he can be an important player for us in the future". The club were promoted from the Championship to the Premier League at the end of the 2014–15 campaign. He was linked with a loan move to Romanian side Rapid București in February 2016, though the deal fell through. He left Watford upon the expiration of his contract at the end of the 2015–16 season. In addition to Zola and Jokanović, he also cited teammate Troy Deeney and coach Harry Kewell as being greatly supportive during his time at Watford.

=== Swansea City ===
On 11 July 2016, Byers joined Premier League club Swansea City. He chose the Welsh club ahead of a move to Wolverhampton Wanderers. He was played in the number 10 role by youth coaches Gary Richards and Cameron Toshack. He scored eight goals for the youth team in the 2016–17 season as they lifted the Premier League Cup and won promotion from Professional Development League 2. He was named the Under-23s Player of the Season for 2017–18 after scoring nine goals and providing ten assists. Francesco Guidolin, Bob Bradley and Paul Clement came and went as manager before Carlos Carvalhal placed Byers in the first-team environment prior to the club's relegation from the Premier League in May 2018. Byers subsequently signed a new two-year deal with the club.

He made his debut for Swansea on 28 August 2018 in a 1–0 defeat to Crystal Palace in the EFL Cup. On 9 February, he scored his first senior goal with a left foot, half-volley at the Liberty Stadium to give the Swans a 1–0 win over Millwall. His first-team involvement under Graham Potter meant that he triggered a one-year contract extension in February. He ended he 2018–19 season in a midfield partnership with Matt Grimes. He made 25 appearances and scored three goals – against Millwall, Brentford and Rotherham United. He signed a new three-year contract in July 2019.

On 27 October 2019, he played in the South Wales derby as Swansea recorded a 1–0 win over Cardiff City. New manager Steve Cooper had reinserted Byers into the first XI after challenging him to be more aggressive out of possession. On 8 February, however, Byers sprained his ankle in a defeat to Derby County and was ruled out for the rest of the 2019–20 season. He recovered quickly from his operation and the COVID-19 pandemic in Wales meant a delay in the English Football League that allowed Byers to contribute to the final nine games of the season. He played a total of 39 games, scoring five goals. He underwent a groin operation in the summer after sustaining a tear in the cartilage in his pubis.

Byers missed the first half of the 2020–21 campaign with a groin injury and made his only appearance for the Swans in a third round FA Cup win over Stevenage as other midfielders established themselves ahead of him during his absence. On 23 January, Byers joined League One side Portsmouth on loan for the remainder of the 2020–21 season. Pompey were pushing for promotion under former Swansea boss Kenny Jackett. Byers had to wait to make an impact at Fratton Park as Jackett preferred to plat a midfield duo of Andy Cannon and Tom Naylor. He played the first 73 minutes of the 2020 EFL Trophy final at Wembley Stadium, which ended in a penalty shoot-out defeat to Salford City following a 0–0 draw. He made his full league debut at Bristol Rovers, ahead of Marcus Harness. Despite being named as Pompey's player of the match in the 1–0 victory, he was then dropped to the bench. Byers was then dropped from matchday squads entirely and refused to attend games as a bystander. Jackett was sacked, and his replacement, Danny Cowley, switched to a 3–4–3 formation with Byers playing at inside-right. Cowley said Byers could provide "that little bit of je ne sais quoi". Portsmouth failed to qualify for the play-offs though and with four starts and ten substitute appearances in the league, Byers complained on Twitter over not being given a consistent run in the starting eleven.

=== Sheffield Wednesday ===
On 3 August 2021, Byers joined League One side Sheffield Wednesday on a two-year deal, with Swansea City including a sell-on clause. He scored his first goal for the club in the EFL Trophy against Harrogate Town on 9 November. He struggled in the first half of the 2021–22 campaign as a groin injury kept him sidelined for two months. Byers made his first league appearance since November against Morecambe at the start of February 2022. He remained an ever-present for the whole month, picking up the club's Player of the Month award and scoring three times. He played both legs of the play-off semi-final defeat to Sunderland.

He missed the end of the 2022–23 season due to a hamstring injury. He missed a total of four months due to the injury, causing him to be absent in the club's successful play-off campaign. He played 29 games during the season, of which 20 ended in victory, picking up six goals and three assists. He also triggered a one-year contract extension, though added that he'd like to stay for even longer as the club had a place in his heart. The injury caused him to miss the League One play-off final victory over Barnsley. Following promotion back to the Championship, an option was taken in Byers contract for him to stay at the club.

Manager Xisco Muñoz said that Byers had an excellent pre-season in the summer of 2023, adding that "he gives me 200 per cent in the training". Xisco was sacked after a terrible opening eleven games left the club bottom of the Championship. Xisco's predecessor as manager, Darren Moore, asked Byers to get forward and be an attacking threat. Xisco's successor as manager, German Danny Röhl, instead preferred him to play as a number six in defensive midfield in front of the backline. Byers was shown a straight red card for violent conduct due to an off-the-ball incident in a game against Preston North End on 29 December. Having made 22 appearances in the first half of the 2023–24 campaign, the Preston game proved to be his last for the club. On 1 February, Byers joined League One side Blackpool on loan for the remainder of the 2023–24 season. Manager Neil Critchley said he was in need of "options" following some key departures in the midfield department. Only three players had played more games for Wednesday in the first half of the campaign and clubs from the Championship and Germany were reported to have been interested in signing him. He played 1,169 minutes in 16 appearances for Blackpool as the Seasiders failed to qualify for the play-offs. He was a popular player at Bloomfield Road and Blackpool were reportedly keen to sign him to a permanent deal ahead of interest from other promotion-chasing League One clubs.

On 17 May 2024, it was confirmed he would be released from Sheffield Wednesday following the expiration of his contract. He was a popular figure with fans at Hillsborough after having scored 14 goals and provided six assists in 74 games for the Owls, with 18 goal contributions and 56 appearances coming under Darren Moore.

=== Port Vale ===
On 9 July 2024, Byers joined League Two club Port Vale on a three-year contract. He had previously played under manager Darren Moore at Sheffield Wednesday. Moore named him as a vice-captain in August 2024. He missed two months due to a knee fracture injury he picked up in early October. He played two games in December before he suffered an injury setback and was unavailable again until the following month. He played 23 league games in the 2024–25 campaign, helping the team to secure an automatic promotion place.

On 16 August 2025, he was sent off 15 minutes into a 0–0 draw at Burton Albion following a strong challenge on Charlie Webster. The club appealed the red card, however, the original decision was upheld by an FA Regulatory Commission. He struggled with injury issues during the 2025–26 campaign. He was injured in new manager Jon Brady's first game in charge, having been hit with a poor challenge during a defeat at Mansfield Town. He did not return to the fitness until the final two games of the season, by which time the club's relegation had been confirmed.

== International career ==
Byers represented Scotland at both under-16 and under-17 level. He fell out of the international youth set-up after fracturing his back at age 18.

== Style of play ==
Byers is a central midfielder with excellent passing ability who can play box-to-box or as a deep-lying playmaker. He has also been described as "tough-tackling".

== Career statistics ==
As of match played 21 November 2026

Appearances and goals by club, season and competition
Club	Season	League			FA Cup		EFL Cup		Other		Total	
Club	Season	Division	Apps	Goals	Apps	Goals	Apps	Goals	Apps	Goals	Apps	Goals
Watford	2014–15	Championship	1	0	0	0	0	0	—		1	0
Watford	2015–16	Premier League	0	0	0	0	0	0	—		0	0
Watford	Total		1	0	0	0	0	0	—		1	0
Swansea City U23	2016–17	—			—		—		6 (Note: Appearance(s) in EFL Trophy)	0	6	0
Swansea City U23	2017–18	—			—		—		4	0	4	0
Swansea City U23	2018–19	—			—		—		1	0	1	0
Swansea City U23	Total		—		—		—		11	0	11	0
Swansea City	2016–17	Premier League	0	0	0	0	0	0	—		0	0
Swansea City	2017–18	Premier League	0	0	0	0	0	0	—		0	0
Swansea City	2018–19	Championship	21	2	3	1	1	0	—		25	3
Swansea City	2019–20	Championship	35	2	1	1	3	2	—		39	5
Swansea City	2020–21	Championship	0	0	1	0	0	0	—		1	0
Swansea City	Total		56	4	5	2	4	2	—		65	8
Portsmouth (loan)	2020–21	League One	14	0	0	0	0	0	1	0	15	0
Sheffield Wednesday	2021–22	League One	22	6	0	0	0	0	5 (Note: 3 appearances and 1 goal in EFL Trophy and 2 appearances in the play-offs)	1	27	7
Sheffield Wednesday	2022–23	League One	24	6	3	0	2	0	0	0	29	6
Sheffield Wednesday	2023–24	Championship	22	1	0	0	0	0	—		22	1
Sheffield Wednesday	Total		68	13	3	0	2	0	5	1	78	14
Blackpool (loan)	2023–24	League One	16	0	0	0	0	0	—		16	0
Port Vale	2024–25	League Two	23	2	0	0	0	0	3	0	26	2
Port Vale	2025–26	League One	20	1	3	0	0	0	2	0	25	1
Port Vale	2026–27	League Two	11	3	1	0	1	0	1	0	14	3
Port Vale	Total		54	6	4	0	1	0	6	0	65	6
Career total			209	23	12	2	7	2	23	1	251	28

== Honours ==
Swansea City U23

- Professional Development League League 1 Division 2: 2016–17
- Premier League Cup: 2016–17; runner-up: 2017–18

Portsmouth

- EFL Trophy runner-up: 2019–20

Port Vale

- EFL League Two second-place promotion: 2024–25

Individual

- Swansea City Under-23s Player of the Season: 2017–18
