= Sir Jack Hayward Training Ground =

Training ground of Wolverhampton Wanderers Football Club

- Interactive map of Sir Jack Hayward Training Ground
- Location: Compton, Wolverhampton
- Coordinates: 52°35′33″N 02°9′47″W
- Owner: Wolverhampton Wanderers F.C.
- Type: Sports facility

Construction
- Opened: 2005
- Cost: £4.6 million

The Sir Jack Hayward Training Ground is the training ground and academy base of English football club, Wolverhampton Wanderers Football Club. It is located in the Compton area of Wolverhampton.

The modern two-storey building stands approximately one mile to the west of the club's home stadium Molineux. It features five high-quality under-soil heated training pitches, eleven changing rooms, a fully equipped gymnasium, and a hydrotherapy pool – one of only a handful of English clubs to own such equipment. The training ground's medical and physiotherapy facilities made it the first British sports club to establish a fully accredited professional sports laboratory, based on AC Milan's Milanello model.

The development opened in November 2005 at a cost of £4.6 million and is named in honour of the club's Life President and former owner, Sir Jack Hayward. It became the club's first owned training facility since they were forced to sell their training ground in the Castlecroft area of the city in the late 1980s due to financial difficulties. The plan was initiated by then-manager Graham Taylor in the mid-1990s but construction was not begun for some years.

In July 2011, plans were announced for a redevelopment of the Compton Park area where the training ground is currently located, that will enable Wolves to build a new indoor pitch and improve facilities to create a 'Category 1' Premier League football academy. The £50 million project involves the football club, the University of Wolverhampton, St Edmund's Catholic Academy, the Archdiocese of Birmingham, and Redrow, the construction company founded by former Wolves owner Steve Morgan.
