= Alexander Denny =

Alexander Denny (July 26, 1940 – 2004), otherwise known as Kji-keptin (Grand Captain) Alex Denny of the Mi'kmaq Grand Council, both a founding member and two-term president (1974–1976 and 1992–1995) of the UNSI (Union of Nova Scotia Indians), was most prominently known for the role he played in the ongoing battle for recognition of Mi'kmaq treaties and Indigenous rights. Born to the Eskasoni First Nation and raised by two elders in the community, Denny was taught the importance of Mi'kmaq treaties from a young age. His passion for and knowledge of his community ultimately led Denny to be credited with attaining linguistic and political rights for the Mi'kmaq at an international level. Additionally, It was Denny and the UNSI that organized the very first Treaty Day.

== Early life ==
Denny's early years were spent in the Eskasoni Nation, where he was born. He acquired much of his knowledge about Mi'kmaq treaties and traditions from his father Andrew, an Elder of the community who along with his wife Mary Anne Denny raised Denny.

== Education ==
Denny attended school in Eskasoni until the age of 14. He was then sent to Chatham, New Brunswick, to attend boarding school until he moved to PEI, where he attended St. Dunstan’s High School. Denny eventually went on to pursue a degree in business.

== Political involvement ==
=== Union of Nova Scotia Indians ===
In 1969, Denny, alongside Joe B. Marshall, Noel Doucette, Greg Johnson and Stan Johnson, established the UNSI in response to the 1969 White Paper. The goal of the white paper was to establish equality between Indigenous peoples and Canadians by eliminating the legislated difference between the two groups which would include "abolishing the Indian Act, phasing out the treaties, and transferring the responsibility for Indigenous peoples from the federal government to the provinces". This proposal stood in stark contrast to the Mi'kmaq's ongoing battle for recognition of their treaties and Aboriginal rights.

=== Mi'kmaq Society v. Canada ===
Denny initiated the conversation with the United Nations Human Rights Committee in 1980 in reference to Canada's continual ignorance of Mi'kmaq treaties and Aboriginal rights. The following is a famous quote from his letter: "Canada has and continues to deny our right to self-determination; Canada has and continues to involuntarily confiscate our territory despite the terms of our treaties; Canada has and continues to deprive our people of its own means of subsistence". Unfortunately, due to a technicality, Denny's communication was deemed inadmissible.

=== Treaty Day ===
Treaty Day, organized by Denny and other UNSI, first took place October 1, 1986, was established in response to the Simon v. The Queen (1985) trial, which validated the 1752 Mi'kmaq peace and friendship treaty. Although it was not explicitly Denny who attained linguistic and political rights for the Mi'kmaq Nation, the verdict of this trial validated the decades worth of research that he and the UNSI had done about these topics.

== Bibliography ==
- "About Alex Denny." Cape Breton University, Cape Breton University, 25 Mar. 2021, https://www.cbu.ca/indigenous-affairs/unamaki-college/kji-keptin-alexander-denny-lnuisultimkeweyokuom/alex-denny-about/.
- Battiste, Marie Ann, editor. Living Treaties: Narrating Mi'kmaw Treaty Relations. Cape Breton University Press, 2016.
- "Mi'Kmaq Society v. Canada." Mi'kmaq Society v. Canada - Indigenous Law Centre - University of Saskatchewan, University of Saskatchewan, https://indigenouslaw.usask.ca/publications/mikmaq-society-v.-canada.php.
- Nickel, Sarah. "Reconsidering 1969: The White Paper and the Making of the Modern Indigenous Rights Movement." Canadian Historical Review, vol. 100, no. 2, 2019, p. 224., doi:10.3138/chr.2018-0082-2.
