= Botti Biabi =

Scottish footballer

Personal information
- Full name: Botti Boulenin Biabi
- Date of birth: 8 March 1996 (age 30)
- Place of birth: Camberwell, London, England
- Height: 1.88 m (6 ft 2 in)
- Position: Forward

Team information
- Current team: Drumchapel United

Youth career
- Clydebank
- 2012–2014: Falkirk

Senior career*
Years	Team	Apps	(Gls)
2014–2015	Falkirk	22	(3)
2015–2019	Swansea City	0	(0)
2017–2018	→ Hamilton Academical (loan)	5	(0)
2018	→ Macclesfield Town (loan)	3	(0)
2019	Ebbsfleet United	5	(0)
2019–2021	Stenhousemuir	35	(9)
2021–2022	Kelty Hearts	26	(3)
2022–2023	Brechin City	24	(9)
2023–2024	Kelty Hearts	22	(1)
2024–current	Drumchapel United		
- * Club domestic league appearances and goals as of 21:54, 4 May 2024 (UTC)

Botti Boulenin Biabi (born 8 March 1996) is a Scottish professional footballer who plays as a forward for West of Scotland League Premier Division side Drumchapel United. He has previously played for Falkirk, Swansea City, Hamilton Academical, Macclesfield Town, Ebbsfleet United, Stenhousemuir, Brechin City and Kelty Hearts.

== Career ==
=== Falkirk ===
Biabi was born in London, however moved to Scotland aged 12 and grew up in the Scotstoun area of Glasgow, where he attended Knightswood Secondary School and was involved in a training programme for youths in the city's housing estates organised by former Scotland player Andy McLaren. He signed for Falkirk as a 16-year-old from Junior side Clydebank. He made his first team debut in a promotion play-off game against Queen of the South on 6 May 2014. In all he made 32 appearances for Falkirk, in all competitions.

=== Swansea City ===
Biabi moved to Premier League club Swansea City on 17 August 2015 for a "six-figure fee", where he joined up with their Under-21 squad.

On 31 August 2017, Biabi signed for Scottish Premiership club Hamilton Academical on a four-month loan.

On 31 January 2019, Biabi signed a one-year extension with Swansea City and joined Macclesfield Town on loan for the remainder of the 2018–19 season.

He was released by the club in July 2019.

=== Brechin City ===
In October 2022, Biabi signed with Highland Football League side Brechin City until the end of the season.

=== Kelty Hearts ===
In summer 2021, Biabi signed for Kelty Hearts and, after a season with Brechin City, he returned to the club in July 2023 signing for a 2nd time.

== International career ==
Because of parentage and birthplace, Biabi had a three-way choice to make between Ivory Coast, England and Scotland but elected to represent Scotland, the country of his upbringing. He was called up to the Scotland under-19 side for matches in September 2014.

== Personal life ==
Botti Biabi personal life he grew up in south London Peckham before moving to Glasgow Scotland at the age of 12. He grew up in the scheme of kingsway in the west end of Glasgow as per this article https://www.dailyrecord.co.uk/sport/football/football-news/loan-hamilton-kid-botti-biabi-11264318.amp In January 2023, Biabi appeared at Glasgow Sheriff Court and pleaded not guilty to four charges: possession of cocaine with intent to supply, possession of cocaine in the Gorbals area, behaving in a threatening or abusive manner (allegedly shouting and swearing on Crown Street), and obstructing police officers by struggling with them. A trial was set for the following month. Later, in mid-2023, court papers revealed additional charges: stealing fuel from a Morrison’s in Anniesland on 16 June 2023; driving without insurance the same day; failing to identify the driver to police when requested; driving without insurance again on Dumbarton Road in July; and failing to comply with a stop sign in Springburn on 24 August 2023. A warrant for Biabi’s arrest was subsequently issued .https://news.stv.tv/west-central/warrant-issued-for-arrest-of-scots-footballer-botti-biabi-who-failed-to-appear-in-court In December 2024, Biabi appeared in court and was sentenced to community service as the outcome of the charges. As of June 2025, he has completed all his community service hours.

In February 2025, Biabi announced on his Instagram account that he and his girlfriend welcomed a baby girl into the world.

== Career statistics ==
As of matches played 4 May 2024

Appearances and goals by club, season and competition
Club	Season	League			National Cup		League Cup		Other		Total	
Club	Season	Division	Apps	Goals	Apps	Goals	Apps	Goals	Apps	Goals	Apps	Goals
Falkirk	2013–14	Scottish Championship	0	0	0	0	0	0	1 (Note: Appearance in the Scottish Championship play-offs)	0	1	0
Falkirk	2014–15	Scottish Championship	22	3	4	0	3	0	2 (Note: Appearances in the Scottish Challenge Cup)	1	31	4
Falkirk	2015–16	Scottish Championship	0	0	0	0	0	0	0	0	0	0
Falkirk	Total		22	3	4	0	3	0	3	1	32	4
Swansea City	2015–16	Premier League	0	0	0	0	0	0	0	0	0	0
Swansea City	2016–17	Premier League	0	0	0	0	0	0	3 (Note: Appearances for Swansea City under-23s in the EFL Trophy)	1	3	1
Swansea City	2017–18	Premier League	0	0	0	0	0	0	1	0	1	0
Swansea City	2018–19	Championship	0	0	0	0	0	0	4	0	4	0
Swansea City	Total		0	0	0	0	0	0	8	1	8	1
Hamilton Academical (loan)	2017–18	Scottish Premiership	5	0	0	0	0	0	0	0	5	0
Macclesfield Town (loan)	2018–19	League Two	3	0	0	0	0	0	0	0	3	0
Ebbsfleet United	2019–20	National League	5	0	0	0	0	0	0	0	5	0
Stenhousemuir	2019–20	Scottish League Two	14	3	0	0	0	0	0	0	14	3
Stenhousemuir	2020–21	Scottish League Two	21	6	2	0	3	1	0	0	26	7
Stenhousemuir	Total		35	9	2	0	3	1	0	0	40	10
Kelty Hearts	2021-22	Scottish League Two	26	3	3	0	4	0	1	0	34	3
Kelty Hearts	2023-24	Scottish League One	22	1	2	0	4	1	2	2	30	4
Kelty Hearts	Total		48	4	5	0	8	1	3	2	64	7
Brechin City	2022-23	Highland League	24	9	1	0	0	0	2 (Note: Two appearances in the Pyramid Playoffs)	1	27	10
Total			142	25	12	0	14	2	16	5	184	32

== Honours ==
Swansea City U23

- Premier League Cup: 2016–17

Kelty Hearts

Cinch Scottish League 2: 2021-2022

Brechin City

Breedon Highland League: 2022-2023
