= Alex Babos =

Footballer (born 1998)

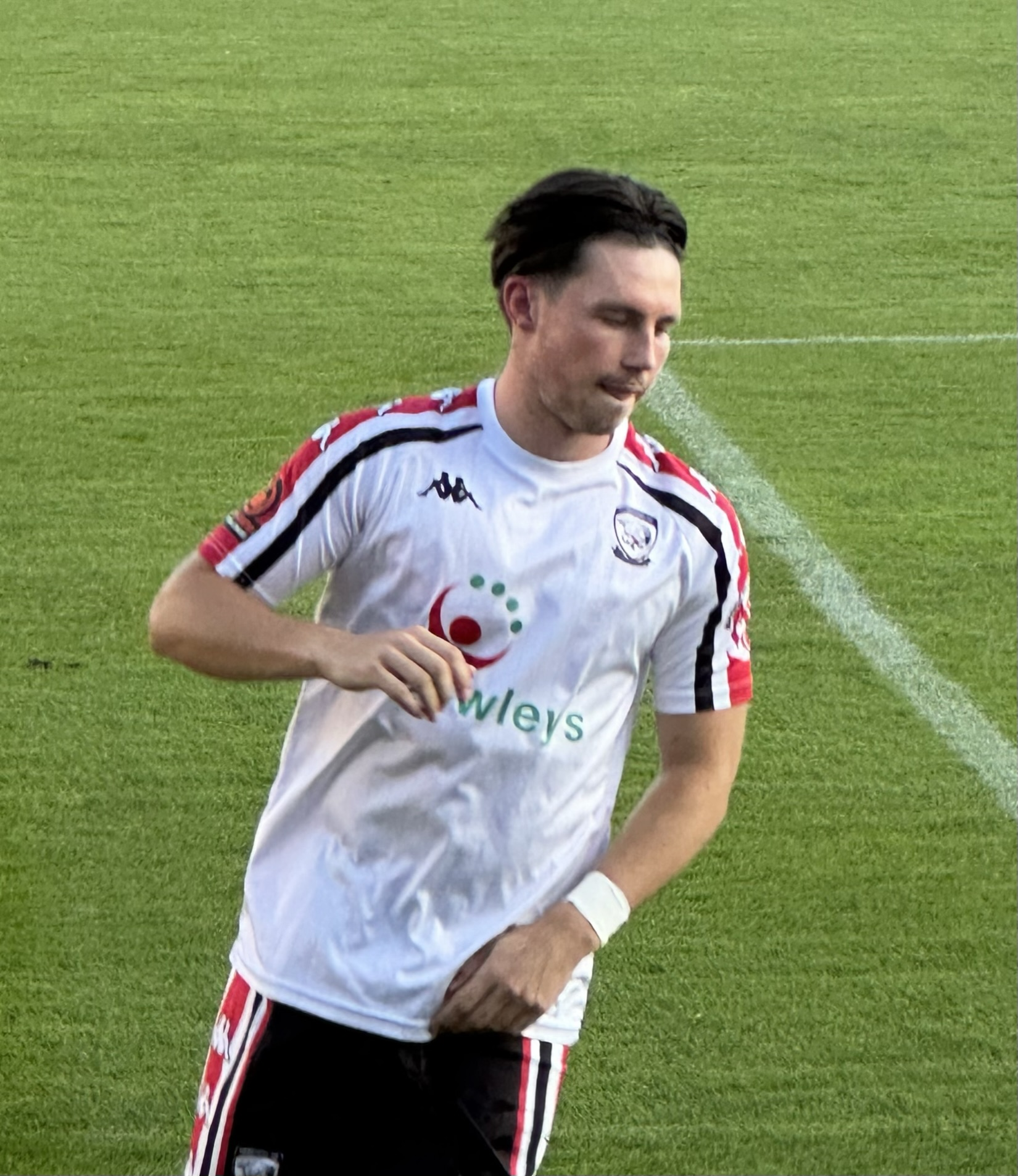
- Babos playing for Hereford

Personal information
- Full name: Alexander Jon Babos
- Date of birth: 22 August 1998 (age 28)
- Place of birth: Stoke-on-Trent, England
- Height: 5 ft 9 in (1.74 m)
- Position: Attacking midfielder

Team information
- Current team: Chesham United
- Number: 18

Youth career
- 2014–2020: Derby County

Senior career*
Years	Team	Apps	(Gls)
2016–2020	Derby County	0	(0)
2018–2019	→ Real Unión (loan)	5	(0)
2019	→ FC United of Manchester (loan)	6	(0)
2020–2021	Alfreton Town	1	(0)
2021	King's Lynn Town	10	(0)
2021–2023	Banbury United	86	(5)
2023–2025	Hereford	86	(15)
2025–	Chesham United	55	(6)

International career^{‡}
2017–2019	Wales U21	7	(0)
- * Club domestic league appearances and goals as of 20:18, 21 November 2026 (UTC) ‡ National team caps and goals as of 11:42, 18 December 2024 (UTC)

Alexander Jon Babos (born 22 August 1998) is a semi-professional footballer who plays as an attacking midfielder for National League South club Chesham United.

== Club career ==
Babos started his youth career at Derby County, joining the club's scholarship programme aged 15, before signing a professional contract with the club in March 2016.

In August 2018, Babos joined Spanish Segunda División B club Real Unión on a season-long loan, but the loan was cut short and returned to Derby in January 2019.

On 24 September 2019, Babos joined Northern Premier League Premier Division club FC United of Manchester on a one-month loan. During his time at Derby he was captain of the U23 side. He was released by Derby in July 2020.

Following his release from Derby, on 9 October 2020, Babos signed for National League North club Alfreton Town following a successful trial period.

On 9 April 2021, Babos joined National League club King's Lynn Town for the remainder of the season.

On 13 August 2021, Babos joined Southern League Premier Division Central club Banbury United. In June 2022, he signed a contract extension ahead of Banbury's first season in the National League North.

On 25 May 2023, Babos signed for National League North club Hereford on a one-year deal. He scored on his debut for Hereford in a 2–2 draw on the opening day of the season against former club King's Lynn Town. He made the National League North team of the week after his second match with Hereford. He made the team of the week for a second time after scoring in a 3–1 home win against Curzon Ashton in October. He featured in a team of the week for the third time during the season after scoring twice in a 4–1 league win away against Peterborough Sports in March.

On 29 March 2024, it was announced that Babos had signed a one-year contract extension at Hereford, tying him down to the club until 2025. In May 2025, he was offered an extension to remain at the club, but announced on 4 May on X that he was leaving.

On 16 June 2025, Babos joined National League South club Chesham United.

== International career ==
In November 2017, Babos received his first call up to the Wales U21 squad for their two UEFA European Under-21 Championship qualifying fixtures, but did not feature in either match. The following May he was called up again for Wales' friendly double-header against Georgia, this time winning his first caps as he started both fixtures, firstly playing the full 90 minutes before being substituted in the second.

He made his competitive debut for Wales U21 the following September, coming on as a second-half substitute in their UEFA European Under-21 Championship qualifying fixture against Liechtenstein. He was called up once again for October's qualifying fixtures against Romania and Switzerland.

In May 2019, he was called up for Wales' friendly double-header against Albania, starting in the first of the two fixtures.

== Career statistics ==
As of match played 21 November 2026

Appearances and goals by club, season and competition
Club	Season	League			National cup (Note: Includes FA Cup)		Other		Total	
Club	Season	Division	Apps	Goals	Apps	Goals	Apps	Goals	Apps	Goals
Derby County U23	2016–17	—			—		1 (Note: Appearance(s) in EFL Trophy)	0	1	0
Real Unión (loan)	2018–19	Segunda División B	5	0	—		3 (Note: Appearances in Copa Federación de España)	0	8	0
FC United of Manchester (loan)	2019–20	NPL Premier Division	6	0	0	0	0	0	6	0
Alfreton Town	2020–21	National League North	1	0	0	0	0	0	1	0
King's Lynn Town	2020–21	National League	10	0	0	0	0	0	10	0
Banbury United	2021–22	SL Premier Division Central	40	0	5	1	2 (Note: Appearance(s) in FA Trophy)	0	47	1
Banbury United	2022–23	National League North	46	5	1	0	4	1	51	6
Banbury United	Total		86	5	6	1	6	1	98	7
Hereford	2023–24	National League North	45	10	4	1	1	0	50	11
Hereford	2024–25	National League North	41	5	2	0	0	0	43	5
Hereford	Total		86	15	6	1	1	0	93	16
Chesham United	2025–26	National League South	41	4	1	1	0	0	42	5
Chesham United	2026–27	National League South	14	2	0	0	0	0	14	2
Chesham United	Total		55	6	1	1	0	0	56	7
Career total			249	26	13	3	11	1	263	30
