= Compton, Wolverhampton =

Suburb of Wolverhampton, England

Coordinates: 52.587°N 2.177°W

Compton
- Location within the West Midlands
- Population: 1,326 (2001 Census)
- Metropolitan borough: Wolverhampton
- Metropolitan county: West Midlands
- Region: West Midlands
- Country: England
- Sovereign state: United Kingdom
- Post town: Wolverhampton
- Postcode district: WV3
- Dialling code: 01902
- Police: West Midlands
- Fire: West Midlands
- Ambulance: West Midlands
- UK Parliament: Wolverhampton West

Compton is a suburb of Wolverhampton, West Midlands, England. It is located to the west of Wolverhampton city centre on the A454, within the Tettenhall Wightwick ward.

== Etymology ==
Its place name reflects its position - first recorded in the Domesday Book of 1086 as 'Contone', from Old English cumb - a narrow valley or deep hollow ('cumb' is likely a continuation in use or a loan word from Brythonic cwm (Welsh) or cum (Cornish), meaning 'valley'), and Old English tūn - a farmstead or fenced place.

== History ==
Compton sits nestled below the ridge that stretches south west from Aldersley, with some of its housing climbing the steep hill near 'The Holloway' on the climb towards Tettenhall Wood. Across the Smestow valley the terrain rises again in the direction of Finchfield. The valley here through which the Smestow Brook flows was formed as a glacial meltwater channel. The area was quarried for its sandstone.

Compton Lock on the Staffordshire and Worcestershire Canal was the starting point in 1766 for the construction of the canal under James Brindley.

In the late 19th-early 20th century, Compton was home of a distinguished local artist Joseph Vickers de Ville (1856–1925). It was during this time that the still-existing terraced housing was built along Henwood Road near the Bridgnorth Road junction.

== Today ==
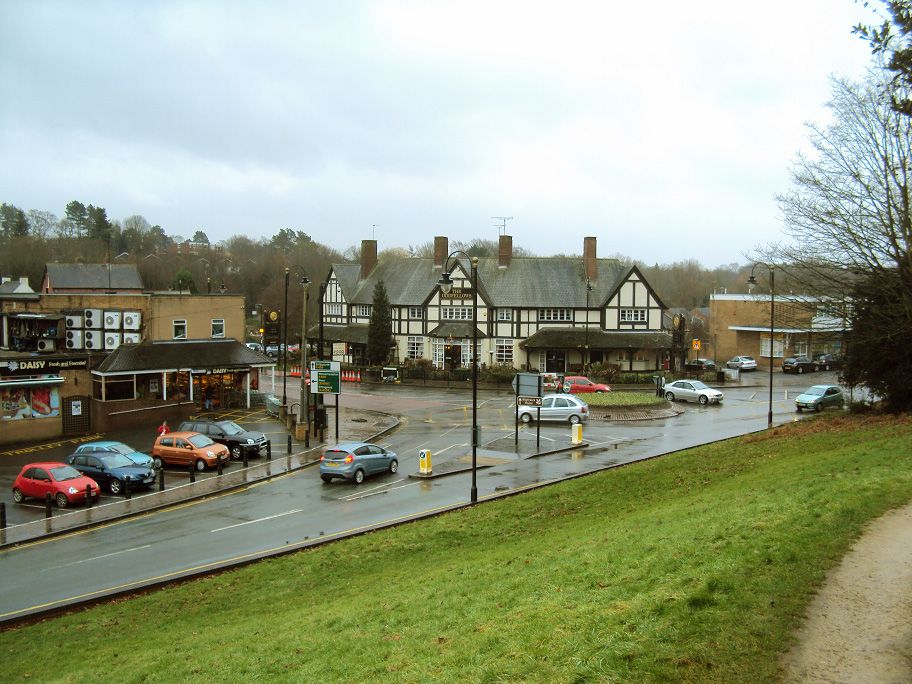
'The Oddfellows', Compton

Today, the quarrying has stopped, and housing estates have been constructed along the side of the valley. Much of the area was built in the latter half of the 20th century, though Compton does retain some of its older buildings such as several houses on The Holloway.

At present, Compton Park campus is one of two Business Schools of the University of Wolverhampton; the other is in Telford. The Sir Jack Hayward Training Ground of Wolverhampton Wanderers football club is in Compton Park.

Next to the Sir Jack Hayward training ground is St Edmund's Catholic Academy and opposite is St Peter's Collegiate Academy.

Compton has several shops, take-aways, restaurants and pubs. The nearest railway station today is Wolverhampton but Compton had its own station, Compton Halt, on the Wombourne Branch Line from 1925 - 1932. The line remained open for freight until closure in 1965. The line now forms part of a railway walk. Compton has a frequent bus service 10/10A connecting Compton with Perton and Wolverhampton while less direct services 62/62A connect to Wolverhampton via Tettenhall and Dunstall Hill. These services are operated by National Express West Midlands while Arriva Midlands service 9 operates hourly Mon-Sat between Wolverhampton and Bridgnorth.
