= St Peter's Collegiate Academy =

Coordinates: 52.5918°N 2.1584°W

Location
- Compton Park; Compton Road West; Compton; Wolverhampton, West Midlands, WV3 9DU; England

Information
- Former name: St Peter's Collegiate School
- Type: Academy
- Religious affiliation: Church of England
- Established: 1844; 182 years ago
- Local authority: Wolverhampton City Council
- Trust: Three Spires Trust
- Department for Education URN: 138852 Tables
- Ofsted: Reports
- Principal: Mr J Lees
- Gender: Mixed
- Age: 11 to 18
- Enrolment: 1,291 as of January 2022
- Website: www.stpetersacademy.org.uk

St Peter's Collegiate Academy (formerly St Peter's Collegiate School) is a mixed Church of England secondary school and sixth form located in the Compton area of Wolverhampton in the West Midlands of England. The school is named after Saint Peter, one of the Twelve Apostles of Jesus Christ.

The school was established in 1844 and maintains strong links with St Peter's Collegiate Church. St Peter's Collegiate School became a voluntary aided school as a result of the Education Act 1944. In 2012 the school converted to academy status and was later renamed St Peter's Collegiate Academy. The school is administered by the Diocese of Lichfield.

St Peter's Collegiate Academy offers GCSEs and BTECs as programmes of study for pupils, while students in the sixth form have the option to study from a range of A-levels and further BTECs.

== Three Spires Sixth Form ==
After Kings Church of England School in Tettenhall became part of the Three Spires Trust in September 2023, its name was changed to St Regis Church of England Academy and St Peters and St Regis Collegiate sixth form was born, this was then later re-launched as Three Spires Sixth Form on Thursday 20 June 2024.

== Notable alumni ==
- Don Howe, former football player, coach, manager and pundit
- Eluned Parrott, Liberal Democrat politician
- Hugh Porter, former cyclist
- Arthur Rowley, former football and cricket player
- Liam Payne, former singer and member of One Direction
- Mike Perkins, artist, Marvel Comics
- Matthew Hudson-Smith, British track and field sprinter
- Henry James Byron, dramatist and actor
