= Callum Hulme =

English footballer

Personal information
- Full name: Callum Jake Hulme
- Date of birth: 10 October 2000 (age 26)
- Place of birth: Manchester, England
- Position: Midfielder

Team information
- Current team: Wythenshawe Town

Youth career
- Manchester City

Senior career*
Years	Team	Apps	(Gls)
2017–2019	Bury	1	(0)
2019–2022	Leicester City	0	(0)
2023–	Wythenshawe Town	0	(0)
- * Club domestic league appearances and goals as of 12:24, 9 August 2019 (UTC)

Callum Jake Hulme (born 10 November 2000) is an English footballer who plays as a midfielder for North West Counties Football League Premier Division club Wythenshawe Town.

== Career ==
Formerly a junior player at Manchester City, he arrived at Bury on 27 February 2017 to begin a two-year scholarship. Having been a regular in Bury's youth team since then, Hulme signed a full professional contract with the club on 26 January 2019. He had already made his first team debut in an EFL League Two match against Grimsby Town on Saturday, 8 September 2018, helping Bury to a 4–0 win.

Hulme signed for Premier League club Leicester City in August 2019. On 10 June 2022, it was announced that Hulme would be released from the club upon expiry of his contract at the end of the month.

On March 20, 2023, Hulme signed for North West Counties Football League Premier Division club Wythenshawe Town.

== Career statistics ==
As of match played 9 March 2019

Appearances and goals by club, season and competition
Club	Season	League			FA Cup		League Cup		Other		Total	
Club	Season	Division	Apps	Goals	Apps	Goals	Apps	Goals	Apps	Goals	Apps	Goals
Bury	2018–19	EFL League Two	1	0	0	0	0	0	3 (Note: Appearances in EFL Trophy.)	0	4	0
Career totals			1	0	0	0	0	0	3	0	4	0
