= Daniel James (footballer) =

Wales international footballer (born 1997)

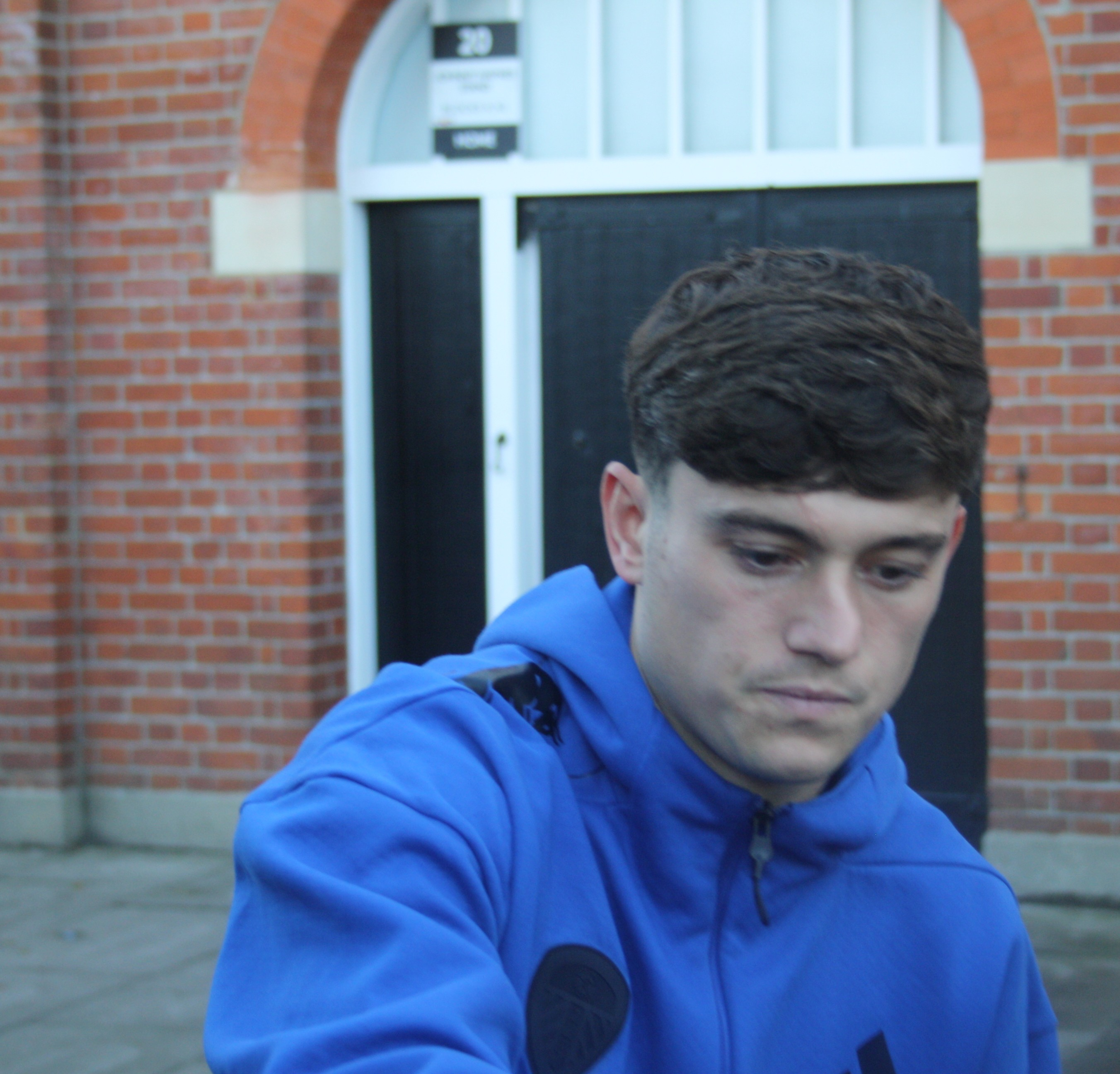
- James with Leeds United in 2025

Personal information
- Full name: Daniel Owen James
- Date of birth: 10 November 1997 (age 29)
- Place of birth: Kingston upon Hull, England
- Height: 5 ft 7 in (1.71 m)
- Positions: Right winger; right wing-back

Team information
- Current team: Leeds United
- Number: 7

Youth career
- 2006–2014: Hull City
- 2014–2016: Swansea City

Senior career*
Years	Team	Apps	(Gls)
2016–2019	Swansea City	33	(4)
2017	→ Shrewsbury Town (loan)	0	(0)
2019–2021	Manchester United	50	(6)
2021–	Leeds United	132	(29)
2022–2023	→ Fulham (loan)	20	(2)

International career^{‡}
2013–2015	Wales U17	8	(2)
2015–2016	Wales U19	8	(1)
2017	Wales U20	3	(1)
2016–2018	Wales U21	11	(0)
2018–	Wales	70	(11)
- * Club domestic league appearances and goals as of 18:15, 5 September 2026 (UTC) ‡ National team caps and goals as of 22:12, 17 November 2026 (UTC)

Daniel Owen James (born 10 November 1997), known as Dan James, is a Welsh professional footballer who plays as a right winger or right wing-back for Premier League club Leeds United and the Wales national team.

James made his professional debut for Swansea City in February 2018, and signed for Manchester United in June 2019. He made 74 appearances for the club, before joining Leeds United in August 2021. He was loaned to Fulham in the 2022–23 season.

James made his senior Wales debut in November 2018, having previously represented the nation at various youth levels, and was part of their squad at UEFA Euro 2020. James also helped Wales qualify for the FIFA World Cup in 2022 for the first time since 1958.

== Early life ==
James was born in Kingston upon Hull, East Riding of Yorkshire, to Elaine and Kevan James. He was raised in the nearby village of South Cave and attended South Hunsley School in Melton.

== Club career ==
=== Swansea City ===
==== Youth and beginnings ====
A highly regarded prospect of the Hull City academy side, James joined Swansea City in 2014 for an initial fee of £72,000, immediately becoming part of their U18 academy side. By the 2016–17 season, James had become an integral part of the Swansea U23 side who gained promotion to the PDL Division 1, winning the league by an 11-point margin. Additionally, James contributed to the side winning the Premier League Cup, and reaching the semi-finals of the Premier League International Cup and the quarter-finals of the EFL Trophy.

Following his impressive displays in the development squad, James was included in the first-team squad for the first time in January 2016 for the FA Cup defeat to Oxford United. Although James did not make an appearance off the bench, his progress was deemed sufficient for him to be offered a new three-year contract the following week. He was again named on the bench for a Premier League fixture against Stoke City in October 2016.

On 30 June 2017, James signed for League One club Shrewsbury Town on loan until the end of the season. His loan deal was terminated by mutual consent on 31 August 2017, after he failed to force his way into the starting 11. James' only inclusion in a matchday squad was as an unused substitute in an EFL Cup first round tie against Nottingham Forest.

==== First team breakthrough ====
On 6 February 2018, he made his Swansea first-team debut as a late substitute, scoring in the 82nd minute of an 8–1 FA Cup victory over Notts County.

He made his league debut for Swansea on 17 August 2018 in a 0–0 draw against Birmingham City in the EFL Championship. He scored his first league goal for the club on 24 November 2018 in a 4–1 home defeat against Norwich City. In December 2018, with James now a regular and one of the standout performers for Swansea, manager Graham Potter revealed that the club were looking to open talks with James over a new contract. Despite discussion of a move to Leeds United during the January 2019 transfer window, James was named in the starting line-up for Swansea against Birmingham City on 29 January, with James scoring his second goal of the season in a 3–3 draw.

On 31 January 2019, with James expressing his desire to leave Swansea to join Leeds, a structured £10 million fee was agreed between the two clubs, James agreed terms and completed the medical at Leeds, and was at Elland Road conducting signing interviews and announcement photoshoots ahead of the deal being completed. However, after speculation of a disagreement between Swansea owners and their chairman regarding the structure of the deal only an hour before the transfer window's 11 pm deadline, James was left at Elland Road awaiting the deal to be signed off by Swansea, with the window closing at 11 pm.

After Swansea failed to complete the deal, James' agent said it was "very disappointing", stating: "Swansea made no attempt to keep the player and at the first sign of money they couldn't show him the door quickly enough." At the end of the 2018–19 season, with Leeds missing out on automatic promotion, Leeds head coach Marcelo Bielsa said that he refused to blame the club for missing out on James, but said, "I'm not underlying the importance of the absence of James".

=== Manchester United ===
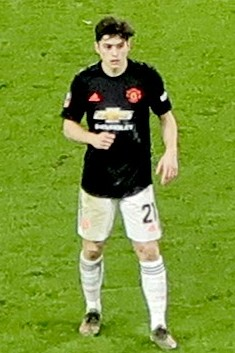
James with Manchester United in 2020.

On 6 June 2019, James underwent a medical with Premier League club Manchester United ahead of a transfer for a reported fee of £15 million with the potential for additional payments. After agreeing a deal "in principle" on 7 June, United announced the signing of James on a five-year contract on 12 June, with an option to extend for a further year. He scored his first goal for the club on his competitive debut, coming on as a substitute to score United's final goal in a 4–0 win over Chelsea. He also scored in United's 2–1 loss against Crystal Palace. In only his fourth game for United he scored his third goal for the club in a 1–1 draw with Southampton, which was later voted goal of the month by United fans. James was also voted United player of the month for August. In March 2020, James ended a seven-month goal drought by scoring in a 5–0 win over Austrian team LASK, the final game before the suspension of football caused by the COVID-19 pandemic.

On 20 December 2020, James scored his first league goal of the season in a 6–2 win against Leeds United. On 2 February 2021, he scored United's Premier League record-equalling goal in the 9–0 home win against Southampton.

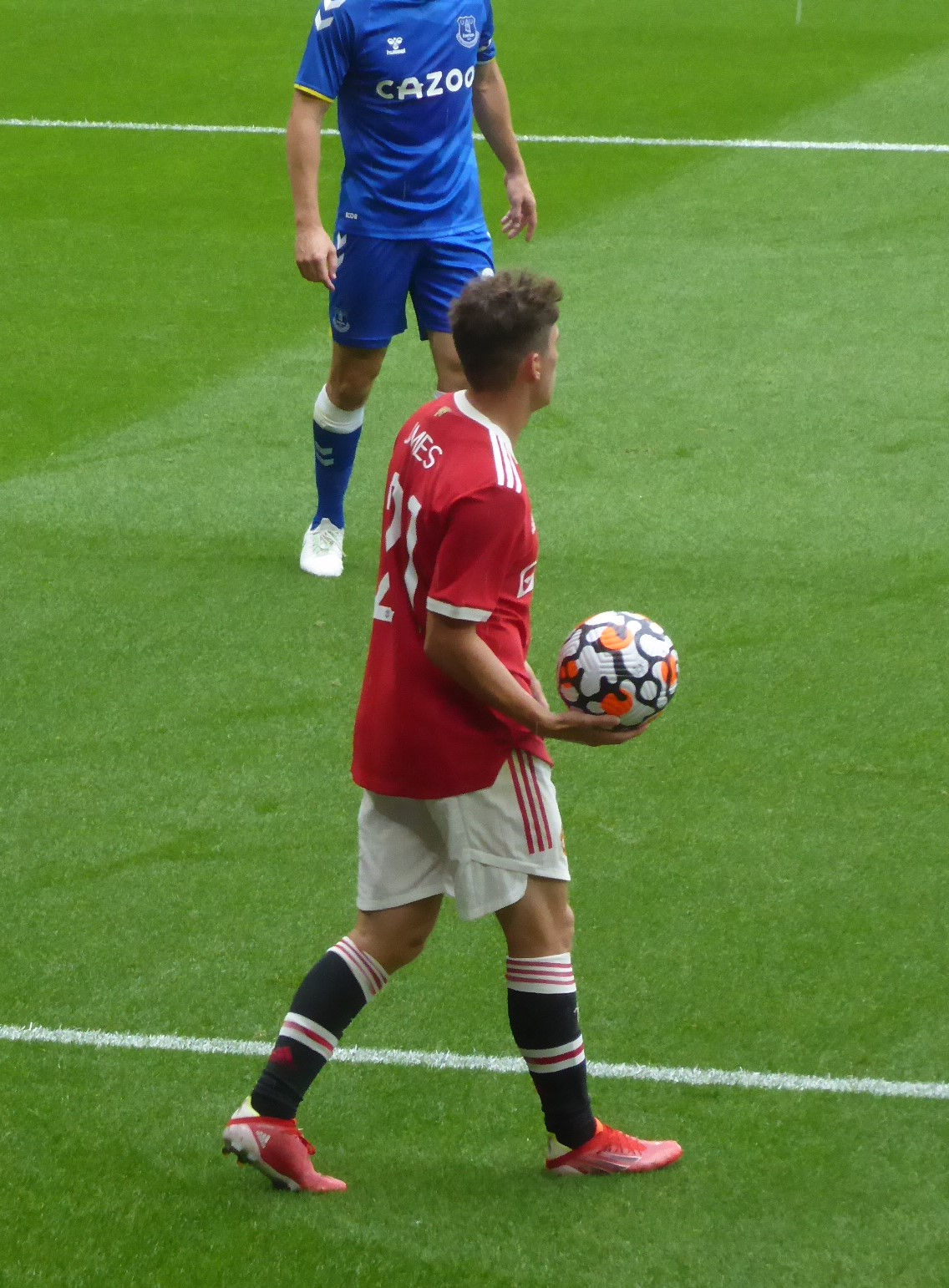
James playing for Manchester United in 2021.

=== Leeds United ===
James signed for Premier League rivals Leeds United on 31 August 2021 for an undisclosed fee on a five-year contract, having nearly joined the club two and a half years prior to the transfer. Many news outlets were reporting the fee to be £25 million. He scored his first Premier League goal for Leeds on 21 November, in the team's 2–1 loss at the Tottenham Hotspur Stadium. On 11 May 2022, James was sent off during Leeds's Premier League match against Chelsea for a challenge on Mateo Kovačić.

James scored 13 goals and added seven assists during his first season in the Championship with Leeds, which saw them fall short of promotion to the Premier League, losing 1–0 to Southampton in the Championship play-off final on 26 May 2024. In James' second season in the Championship with Leeds, he scored 12 goals in the league, which was second on the squad, only to Joël Piroe's 19, adding nine assists, which was third on the team, behind Manor Solomon and Junior Firpo. On 3 May 2025, James won the Championship title with Leeds and was promoted back to the Premier League with a 2–1 win against Plymouth Argyle at Home Park. The following day, James was named Leeds United Player of the Year for the 2024–25 season.

==== Loan to Fulham ====
On 1 September 2022, James was loaned out to Premier League club Fulham until the end of the 2022–23 season.

== International career ==
=== Youth levels ===
Born in England, James qualifies to play for Wales through his late father, Kevan, who was born in Aberdare. James scored at the Toulon Tournament playing for Wales U20 in a 1–0 win over Bahrain U20 after he won and scored the resulting penalty.

=== Senior team ===
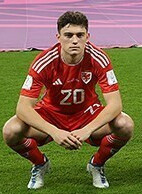
James playing for Wales at the 2022 FIFA World Cup in Qatar.

James received his first senior call-up for the 2018 FIFA World Cup qualifying game against Serbia in 2017 by manager Chris Coleman and subsequently made his full Wales debut under Coleman's successor, Ryan Giggs, in a match against Albania in November 2018, playing the first 58 minutes of the game. James scored his first Wales goal in only his second cap, netting the only goal of the game in the opening minutes against Slovakia in his competitive home debut. During the September international break, James netted the only goal in a friendly win against Belarus. In May 2021, he was selected for the Wales squad for the delayed UEFA Euro 2020 tournament. In November 2022, he was named in the Wales squad for the 2022 FIFA World Cup. On 26 March 2024, he missed the deciding penalty as Wales lost the shoot-out against Poland in the UEFA Euro 2024 qualifying play-off final and failed to advance to the final tournament.

== Style of play ==
James can play as a winger, and also as an attacking midfielder. He is known for his pace and skill.

== Career statistics ==
=== Club ===
As of match played 30 August 2026

Appearances and goals by club, season and competition
Club	Season	League			FA Cup		EFL Cup		Europe		Other		Total	
Club	Season	Division	Apps	Goals	Apps	Goals	Apps	Goals	Apps	Goals	Apps	Goals	Apps	Goals
Swansea City U21	2016–17	—			—		—		—		3 (Note: Appearance(s) in EFL Trophy)	1	3	1
Swansea City U21	2017–18	—			—		—		—		1	0	1	0
Swansea City U21	Total		—		—		—		—		4	1	4	1
Swansea City	2017–18	Premier League	0	0	1	1	—		—		—		1	1
Swansea City	2018–19	Championship	33	4	4	1	1	0	—		—		38	5
Swansea City	Total		33	4	5	2	1	0	—		—		39	6
Shrewsbury Town (loan)	2017–18	League One	0	0	—		0	0	—		0	0	0	0
Manchester United	2019–20	Premier League	33	3	3	0	4	0	6 (Note: Appearances in UEFA Europa League)	1	—		46	4
Manchester United	2020–21	Premier League	15	3	1	0	1	0	9 (Note: Two appearances and one goal in UEFA Champions League, seven appearances and one goal in UEFA Europa League)	2	—		26	5
Manchester United	2021–22	Premier League	2	0	—		—		—		—		2	0
Manchester United	Total		50	6	4	0	5	0	15	3	—		74	9
Leeds United	2021–22	Premier League	32	4	1	0	2	0	—		—		35	4
Leeds United	2022–23	Premier League	4	0	—		1	0	—		—		5	0
Leeds United	2023–24	Championship	40	13	2	0	1	0	—		3 (Note: Appearances in Championship play-offs)	0	46	13
Leeds United	2024–25	Championship	36	12	1	0	0	0	—		—		37	12
Leeds United	2025–26	Premier League	19	0	1	0	1	0	—		—		21	0
Leeds United	2026–27	Premier League	1	0	0	0	1	1	—		—		2	1
Leeds United	Total		132	29	5	0	5	0	—		3	0	145	29
Fulham (loan)	2022–23	Premier League	20	2	3	1	—		—		—		23	3
Career total			235	41	17	3	11	0	15	3	7	1	285	48

=== International ===
As of match played 17 November 2026

Appearances and goals by national team and year
National team	Year	Apps	Goals
Wales	2018	1	0
Wales	2019	9	2
Wales	2020	7	1
Wales	2021	13	2
Wales	2022	11	0
Wales	2023	8	1
Wales	2024	6	1
Wales	2025	6	2
Wales	2026	9	2
Total		70	11

As of match played 18 November 2025
Wales' score listed first, score column indicates score after each James goal.

List of international goals scored by Daniel James
No.	Date	Venue	Cap	Opponent	Score	Result	Competition
1	24 March 2019	Cardiff City Stadium, Cardiff, Wales	2	Slovakia	1–0	1–0	UEFA Euro 2020 qualification
2	9 September 2019	Cardiff City Stadium, Cardiff, Wales	6	Belarus	1–0	1–0	Friendly
3	18 November 2020	Cardiff City Stadium, Cardiff, Wales	17	Finland	2–0	3–1	2020–21 UEFA Nations League B
4	30 March 2021	Cardiff City Stadium, Cardiff, Wales	19	Czech Republic	1–0	1–0	2022 FIFA World Cup qualification
5	8 October 2021	Sinobo Stadium, Prague, Czech Republic	27	Czech Republic	2–2	2–2	2022 FIFA World Cup qualification
6	16 June 2023	Cardiff City Stadium, Cardiff, Wales	44	Armenia	1–0	2–4	UEFA Euro 2024 qualification
7	21 March 2024	Cardiff City Stadium, Cardiff, Wales	50	Finland	4–1	4–1	UEFA Euro 2024 qualification
8	22 March 2025	Cardiff City Stadium, Cardiff, Wales	56	Kazakhstan	1–0	3–1	2026 FIFA World Cup qualification
9	18 November 2025	Cardiff City Stadium, Cardiff, Wales	61	North Macedonia	4–1	7–1	2026 FIFA World Cup qualification
10	26 March 2026	Cardiff City Stadium, Cardiff, Wales	62	Bosnia and Herzegovina	1–0	1–1 (a.e.t.) (2–4 p)	2026 FIFA World Cup qualification
11	1 October 2026	Cardiff City Stadium, Cardiff, Wales	68	Norway	1–1	2–1	2026–27 UEFA Nations League A

== Honours ==
Swansea City U23

- Premier League 2 Division 2: 2016–17
- Premier League Cup: 2016–17

Manchester United

- UEFA Europa League runner-up: 2020–21

Leeds United

- EFL Championship: 2024–25

Individual

- Swansea City Best Newcomer of the Year: 2018–19
- Swansea City Community Champion: 2018–19
- EFL Championship Player of the Month: February 2025
- EFL Championship Team of the Season: 2024–25
- Leeds United Player of the Season: 2024–25
- PFA Team of the Year: 2024–25 Championship
