= 2019–20 Hull City A.F.C. season =

English football club season

Hull City
2019–20 season
- Owner: Assem Allam
- Manager: Grant McCann
- Stadium: KCOM Stadium
- Championship: 24th (relegated)
- FA Cup: Fourth round
- EFL Cup: Second round
- Top goalscorer: League: Jarrod Bowen (16); All: Jarrod Bowen (17)
- Highest home attendance: 24,109 (v Chelsea, 25 January)
- Lowest home attendance: 9,757 (v Swansea City, 14 February) (Note: Excludes matches held behind closed doors.)
- Average home league attendance: 11,553 (as of 29 February)
Home colours	Away colours	Third colours

The 2019–20 season was Hull City's third consecutive season in the Championship and their 116th year in existence. Along with the Championship, the club competed in the FA Cup and EFL Cup. The season covers the period from 1 July 2019 to 30 June 2020, but also included details from the extended season because of the COVID-19 pandemic. Hull were relegated to League One at the end of the season after finishing in 24th place.

== Events ==
- In February 2019, the new crest to be used from the start of the 2019–20 season was revealed following a supporter-led process of redesigning the club crest. This would be similar to the previous design but with the club name at the top and a different shape.
- On 31 May 2019, the club announced that a Concessionary Ticket Model would be introduced for the 2019–20 season after a vote on ticketing options was made by club members.
- On 8 June 2019, manager Nigel Adkins indicated that he would not take-up the offer of a new contract with the club and left the club before the start of the season. Assistant manager Andy Crosby would also leave the club at the same time.
- On 21 June 2019, Grant McCann was appointed as head coach on a one-year rolling contract, Cliff Byrne would also be joining as his assistant.
- On 25 June 2019, goalkeeper Matt Ingram was signed from Queens Park Rangers on a three-year deal for an undisclosed fee.
- On 5 July 2019, Charlie Andrew went on loan to Bradford (Park Avenue) until January 2020. Though on 20 September 2019, he moved on a month-long loan spell to Alfreton Town. This was later extend for the remainder of the season. But on 31 January 2020, he was allowed to go on a free transfer to Lincoln City.
- On 8 July 2019, David Marshall signed for Wigan Athletic after his contract ran out at Hull.
- On 10 July 2019, Tom Eaves joined the club on a three-year deal after turning down a contract extension with Gillingham.
- On 15 July 2019, Danny Lupano was signed from Birmingham City for an undisclosed fee.
- On 18 July 2019, Ryan Tafazolli signed a two-year deal with the club, after being released by Peterborough United.
- On 18 July 2019, Josh Bowler joined on a season-long loan from Everton, which was confirmed on 1 June 2020 as the end of the 2019–20 season.
- On 24 July 2019, Harvey Cartwright moved on a season-long loan to Barton Town.
- On 25 July 2019, Eric Lichaj was named as captain with Jackson Irvine as vice-captain.
- On 26 July 2019, Sean McLoughlin of Cork City completed a three-year deal with the club for an undisclosed fee. Though he was loaned out for six months on 31 July 2019 to St Mirren.
- On 29 July 2019, Max Sheaf joined Cheltenham Town on loan until January 2020, which was later extended to the end of the season.
- On 2 August 2019, George Honeyman, of Sunderland, signed a three-year deal with the club for an undisclosed fee.
- On 8 August 2019, goalkeeper Harrison Foulkes rejoined Pickering Town on loan until January 2020.
- On 8 August 2019, mid-fielder Leonardo Lopes of Wigan Athletic signed a three-year deal with the club for an undisclosed fee.
- On 8 August 2019, Jacob Greaves signed a three-year contract extension with the club and then moved on loan to Cheltenham Town until January 2020, which was later extended to the end of the season.
- On 8 August 2019, Matthew Pennington of Everton signed a season-long loan deal with the club, which was confirmed on 5 June 2020 as the end of the 2019–20 season.
- On 8 August 2019, Josh Magennis of Bolton Wanderers signed a two-year deal with the club for a nominal fee.
- On 8 August 2019, Callum Elder of Leicester City signed a three-year deal with the club for an undisclosed fee.
- On 16 August 2019, Callum Jones signed a one-year deal from Bury for an undisclosed fee.
- On 20 August 2019, Elliot Bonds signed from Dagenham & Redbridge, until the end if the 2019–20 season, on a free transfer.
- On 21 August 2019, Lewis Ritson moved on loan to Blyth Spartans until January 2020.
- On 2 September 2019, Nouha Dicko joined Vitesse Arnhem on loan for the remainder of the season.
- On 14 September 2019, signed Norbert Balogh from Palermo on a free transfer on a one-year contract, but on 29 May 2020 he left the club by mutual consent.
- On 23 September 2019, Andy Dawson returned to the club as part of the Academy Coaching Staff.
- On 18 October 2019, goalkeeper David Robson moved to Gainsborough Trinity to gain some work experience.
- On 30 October 2019, Billy Chadwick and David Robson joined Gainsborough Trinity on loan until December 2019.
- On 11 November 2019, Will Taylor moved to Pickering Town on a free transfer.
- On 29 November 2019, Will Mannion moved on loan to Kidderminster Harriers until January 2020, but this was later extended for the remainder of the season.
- On 6 December 2019, Tyler Hamilton moved to Hartlepool United on loan until 4 January 2020, this was later extended for a month. On 31 January 2020, Hamilton's contract was terminated by mutual consent.
- On 3 January 2020, Herbie Kane, of Liverpool, signed a loan-deal with the club for the remainder of the 2019–20 season, which was confirmed on 8 June 2020 as the end of the 2019–20 season.
- On 16 January 2020, Martin Samuelsen, of West Ham United, signed a two-and-a-half-year contract with the club for an undisclosed fee.
- On 17 January 2020, Brandon Fleming moved on loan to Bolton Wanderers for the remainder of the season.
- On 17 January 2020, Mallik Wilks joined on-loan from Barnsley for the remainder of the season, with an option for the deal to become permanent, but Barnsley refused to allow him to extend his contract to the end of the 2019–20 season.
- On 27 January 2020, David Milinković moved on loan to Vancouver Whitecaps until 31 December 2020.
- On 31 January 2020, Kamil Grosicki signed an 18-month contract with West Bromwich Albion for an undisclosed fee.
- On 31 January 2020, Marcus Maddison joined on loan from Peterborough United for the remainder of the season.
- On 31 January 2020, Alex John joined on loan from Yeovil Town until the end of the season, with an option to make the move permanent.
- On 31 January 2020, Danny Lupano joined Derry City on loan until the end of the season.
- On 31 January 2020, Markus Henriksen moved on loan to Bristol City for the remainer of the season, but was allowed to leave on 21 June 2020 to pursue "other options".
- On 31 January 2020, James Scott, of Motherwell, signed a three-and-a-half-year deal for £1.5 million. The club holding an option for a year extension.
- On 31 January 2020, Jarrod Bowen five-and-a-half-year contract with West Ham United for £22 million.
- On 5 February 2020, the club announced the death of Kris Blakeston one of the Academy coaches, the match against Swansea City on 14 February 2020 was dedicated to his memory.
- On 10 June 2020, Jon Toral, Kevin Stewart and Angus MacDonald agreed short-term contract extensions to cover the extended season.
- On 11 June 2020, Daniel Batty agreed a short-term contract extension to cover the extended season.
- On 15 June 2020, Robbie McKenzie agreed a short-term contract extension to cover the extended season.
- On 16 June 2020, following Kidderminster Harriers season termination on 22 April 2020 after a vote of clubs in the league, Will Mannion returned to the club and agreed a short-term contract extension to cover the extended season.
- On 16 June 2020, the club indicated they had failed to agree short-term contract extensions with Eric Lichaj, Jackson Irvine, Stephen Kingsley and loanee Marcus Maddison. The four player will leave the club at the end of June 2020 and not take part in the remaining matches once the season resumes.
- On 17 June 2020, Jordy de Wijs was named as captain for rest of the restarted season.
- On 26 June 2020, the club took up an option for a year extension to Daniel Batty's contract.
- On 30 June 2020, the club announced that Nouha Dicko and Markus Henriksen would leave after the expiry of their contracts.
- On 2 July 2020, Mallik Wilks joined Hull on a two-year permanent deal.
- On 2 July 2020, Festus Arthur of Stockport County signed a three-year deal for an undisclosed fee.

== Effects of the COVID-19 pandemic ==
On 13 March 2020, the season was suspended due to COVID-19 pandemic, initially until 3 April but later extended to mid-May.

On 13 May, following an EFL meeting, the clubs decided to continue with the season with plans for players to return to training on 25 May.

In May, 1,014 tests were carried out across all of the English Football League and funded by the clubs. Two people from Hull City returned positive results.

On 31 May, the EFL stated plans to restart the league on 20 June, with the play-off final being scheduled for around 30 July, subject to safety requirement and government approval being met.

On 8 June, the first round of fixtures was released. The first set of fixtures following the restart was scheduled for 20 June with Hull's first fixture being the postponed home game against Charlton Athletic with a 3:00 pm kick-off. All the remaining fixtures would be played behind closed doors.

== Squad ==
As of 2 July 2020.

Note: Flags indicate national team as defined under FIFA eligibility rules; some limited exceptions apply. Players may hold more than one non-FIFA nationality.

No.	Pos.	Nation	Player
1	GK	ENG	George Long
3	DF	ENG	Ryan Tafazolli
4	DF	NED	Jordy de Wijs (captain)
5	DF	ENG	Reece Burke
6	MF	ENG	Kevin Stewart
8	MF	ENG	Daniel Batty
9	FW	ENG	Tom Eaves
10	MF	ESP	Jon Toral
11	MF	ENG	Marcus Maddison (on loan from Peterborough)
12	GK	ENG	Will Mannion
13	GK	ENG	Matt Ingram
15	DF	ENG	Angus MacDonald
16	MF	ENG	Robbie McKenzie
17	DF	IRL	Sean McLoughlin
18	MF	ENG	George Honeyman
19	MF	ENG	Josh Bowler (on loan from Everton)
21	DF	ENG	Brandon Fleming
25	DF	ENG	Matthew Pennington (on loan from Everton)

No.	Pos.	Nation	Player
26	DF	AUS	Callum Elder
27	FW	NIR	Josh Magennis
28	MF	ENG	Max Sheaf
29	DF	ENG	Lewis Ritson
30	DF	ENG	Jacob Greaves
31	FW	ENG	Keane Lewis-Potter
32	MF	ENG	Billy Chadwick
33	MF	ENG	Ahmed Salam
35	DF	ENG	Matty Jacob
37	MF	POR	Leonardo Lopes
40	FW	ENG	James Berry
41	MF	ENG	Herbie Kane (on loan from Liverpool)
42	MF	NOR	Martin Samuelsen
43	FW	ENG	Mallik Wilks
44	FW	SCO	James Scott
–	DF	GHA	Festus Arthur
–	DF	ENG	Alex John (on loan from Yeovil Town)

=== Out on loan ===
Note: Flags indicate national team as defined under FIFA eligibility rules; some limited exceptions apply. Players may hold more than one non-FIFA nationality.

No.	Pos.	Nation	Player
7	MF	FRA	David Milinković (at Vancouver Whitecaps)

== Transfers ==
=== Transfers in ===
Date	Position	Nationality	Name	From	Fee	Ref.
1 July 2019	GK	(England)	Matt Ingram	(England) Queens Park Rangers	£200,000	
1 July 2019	RB	(England)	Lucas Odunston	(England) Leeds United	Free transfer	
10 July 2019	CF	(England)	Tom Eaves	(England) Gillingham	Free transfer	
15 July 2019	CB	(Belgium)	Danny Lupano	(England) Birmingham City	Undisclosed	
18 July 2019	CB	(England)	Ryan Tafazolli	(England) Peterborough United	Free transfer	
26 July 2019	CB	(Republic of Ireland)	Sean McLoughlin	(Republic of Ireland) Cork City	Undisclosed	
2 August 2019	AM	(England)	George Honeyman	(England) Sunderland	Undisclosed	
8 August 2019	LB	(Australia)	Callum Elder	(England) Leicester City	Undisclosed	
8 August 2019	CM	(Portugal)	Leonardo Lopes	(England) Wigan Athletic	Undisclosed	
8 August 2019	CF	(Northern Ireland)	Josh Magennis	(England) Bolton Wanderers	Nominal fee	
16 August 2019	AM	(England)	Callum Jones	(England) Bury	Undisclosed	
20 August 2019	CM	(Guyana)	Elliot Bonds	(England) Dagenham & Redbridge	Free transfer	
14 September 2019	CF	(Hungary)	Norbert Balogh	(Italy) Palermo	Free transfer	
16 January 2020	CM	(Norway)	Martin Samuelsen	(England) West Ham United	Undisclosed	
31 January 2020	CF	(Scotland)	James Scott	(Scotland) Motherwell	£1.5 million	
2 July 2020	LW	(England)	Mallik Wilks	(England) Barnsley	Undisclosed	
2 July 2020	DF	(Ghana)	Festus Arthur	(England) Stockport County	Undisclosed	

=== Transfers out ===
Date	Position	Nationality	Name	To	Fee	Ref.
1 July 2019	GK	(England)	Callum Burton	(England) Cambridge United	Released	
1 July 2019	CB	(England)	Adam Curry	Free agent	Released	
1 July 2019	AM	(Brazil)	Evandro	(Brazil) Santos	Released	
1 July 2019	RB	(England)	Joshua Hesson	Free agent	Released	
1 July 2019	MF	(England)	Elliot Holmes	Free agent	Released	
1 July 2019	CF	(England)	Will Keane	(England) Ipswich Town	Released	
1 July 2019	CB	(Czech Republic)	Ondřej Mazuch	Free agent	Released	
1 July 2019	LB	(Wales)	Jake Nicholls	(Spain) Almuñécar City	Free transfer	
1 July 2019	FW	(England)	Tom Powell	Free agent	Released	
1 July 2019	CB	(England)	Liam Ridgewell	(England) Southend United	Released	
1 July 2019	LW	(England)	Callum Smith	(England) Dunston UTS	Released	
1 July 2019	MF	(England)	Josh Thacker	Free agent	Released	
1 July 2019	LM	(England)	James Weir	(England) Bolton Wanderers	Released	
8 July 2019	GK	(Scotland)	David Marshall	(England) Wigan Athletic	Free transfer	
17 July 2019	DF	(France)	Chams Faraji	(Poland) Radomiak	Free transfer	
12 August 2019	CF	(England)	Fraizer Campbell	(England) Huddersfield Town	Free transfer	
11 November 2019	MF	(England)	Will Taylor	(England) Pickering Town	Free transfer	
31 January 2020	RW	(England)	Jarrod Bowen	(England) West Ham United	£22 million	
31 January 2020	MF	(Poland)	Kamil Grosicki	(England) West Bromwich Albion	Undisclosed	
31 January 2020	LM	(England)	Tyler Hamilton	Free agent	Mutual consent	
31 January 2020	GK	(England)	Charlie Andrew	(England) Lincoln City	Free transfer	
29 May 2020	CF	(Hungary)	Norbert Balogh	Free agent	Mutual consent	
1 July 2020	DF	(United States)	Eric Lichaj	Free agent	Released	
1 July 2020	MF	(Australia)	Jackson Irvine	Free agent	Released	
1 July 2020	DF	(Scotland)	Stephen Kingsley	Free agent	Released	
1 July 2020	FW	(Mali)	Nouha Dicko	Free agent	Released	
1 July 2020	MF	(Norway)	Markus Henriksen	Free agent	Released	

=== Loans in ===
Date from	Position	Nationality	Name	From	Date until	Ref.
18 July 2019	RW	(England)	Josh Bowler	(England) Everton	End of 2019–20 season	
8 August 2019	CB	(England)	Matthew Pennington	(England) Everton	End of 2019–20 season	
3 January 2020	CM	(England)	Herbie Kane	(England) Liverpool	End of 2019–20 season	
17 January 2020	LW	(England)	Mallik Wilks	(England) Barnsley	30 June 2020	
31 January 2020	DM	(Wales)	Alex John	(England) Yeovil Town	30 June 2020	
31 January 2020	AM	(England)	Marcus Maddison	(England) Peterborough United	30 June 2020	

=== Loans out ===
Date from	Position	Nationality	Name	To	Date until	Ref.
5 July 2019	GK	(England)	Charlie Andrew	(England) Bradford (Park Avenue)	20 September 2019	
24 July 2019	GK	(England)	Harvey Cartwright	(England) Barton Town	30 June 2020	
29 July 2019	CM	(England)	Max Sheaf	(England) Cheltenham Town	30 June 2020	
31 July 2019	CB	(Republic of Ireland)	Sean McLoughlin	(Scotland) St Mirren	January 2020	
8 August 2019	GK	(England)	Harrison Foulkes	(England) Pickering Town	January 2020	
8 August 2019	DF	(England)	Jacob Greaves	(England) Cheltenham Town	30 June 2020	
21 August 2019	DF	(England)	Lewis Ritson	(England) Blyth Spartans	January 2020	
2 September 2019	FW	(Mali)	Nouha Dicko	(Netherlands) Vitesse Arnhem	30 June 2020	
20 September 2019	GK	(England)	Charlie Andrew	(England) Alfreton Town	31 January 2020	
18 October 2019	GK	(Wales)	David Robson	(England) Gainsborough Trinity	Work experience	
30 October 2019	MF	(England)	Billy Chadwick	(England) Gainsborough Trinity	December 2019	
30 October 2019	GK	(Wales)	David Robson	(England) Gainsborough Trinity	December 2019	
29 November 2019	GK	(England)	Will Mannion	(England) Kidderminster Harriers	30 June 2020	
6 December 2019	LM	(England)	Tyler Hamilton	(England) Hartlepool United	31 January 2020	
17 January 2020	DF	(England)	Brandon Fleming	(England) Bolton Wanderers	30 June 2020	
27 January 2020	LW	(France)	David Milinković	(Canada) Vancouver Whitecaps	31 December 2020	
31 January 2020	CB	(Belgium)	Danny Lupano	(Republic of Ireland) Derry City	30 June 2020	
31 January 2020	MF	(Norway)	Markus Henriksen	(England) Bristol City	21 June 2020	
29 February 2020	WB	(Egypt)	Ahmed Salam	(England) Gainsborough Trinity	April 2020	
6 March 2020	MF	(England)	Jake Bayram	(England) Ossett United	30 June 2020	

== Pre-season ==
On 4 June 2019, the club announced 3 pre-season friendly matches, Leyton Orient on 9 July 2019, Mansfield Town on 20 July 2019 and Doncaster Rovers on 27 July 2019. On 18 June 2019, a home match against French side Amiens SC was announced for 24 July 2019. The newly appointed head coach, Grant McCann, would take charge of the team as they return to pre-season training on 24 June 2019. A further pre-season friendly match was announced on 2 July 2019 against Lincoln Red Imps to take place on 12 July 2019 in Marbella, Spain.

A week-long pre-season training camp in Marbella took place from 7 July 2019, with the first 2 friendly games taking place at the Marbella Football Center.

Win Draw Loss

9 July 2019 Friendly	Hull City	2–2	Leyton Orient	Marbella, Spain
19:30 CEST	Burke 23'; Lewis-Potter 58'	Report	Gorman 29'; Coulson 68'	Stadium: Marbella Football Center

12 July 2019 Friendly	Hull City	2–1	Lincoln Red Imps (Gibraltar)	Marbella, Spain
19:00 WEST	McKenzie 20'; Trialist 56'	Report	Gómez 10'	Stadium: Marbella Football Center

20 July 2019 Friendly	Mansfield Town	2–2	Hull City	Mansfield
15:00 BST	Bishop 44'; Hamilton 54'	Report	Bowen 27'; Dicko 46'	Stadium: Field Mill; Attendance: 1,799; Referee: Michael Salisbury

24 July 2019 Friendly	Hull City	0–2	Amiens SC (France)	Kingston upon Hull
19:30 BST		Report	Guirassy 53'; Ghoddos 84'	Stadium: KCOM Stadium

27 July 2019 Friendly	Doncaster Rovers	2–2	Hull City	Doncaster
14:00 BST	Gomes 22'; Coppinger 55'	Report	Irvine 7'; Bowler 87'	Stadium: Keepmoat Stadium; Attendance: 2,477

=== Mid-season ===
13 June 2020 Friendly	Newcastle United	2–0	Hull City	Newcastle, England
	Lejeune 15'; Maximin 62'	Report		Stadium: St James' Park; Attendance: 0

== Competitions ==
=== Overall ===
Competition	Started round	Current position / round	Final position / round	First match	Last match
Championship	—	24th		3 August 2019	22 July 2020
League Cup	First round	—	Second round	13 August 2019	27 August 2019
FA Cup	Third round	—	Fourth round	4 January 2020	25 January 2020

Updated to match played 22 July 2020.
Source: Competitions

=== League table ===
Pos	Team	Pld	W	D	L	GF	GA	GD	Pts	Promotion, qualification or relegation
19	Luton Town	46	14	9	23	54	82	−28	51	
20	Birmingham City	46	12	14	20	54	75	−21	50	
21	Barnsley	46	12	13	21	49	69	−20	49	
22	Charlton Athletic (R)	46	12	12	22	50	65	−15	48	Relegation to EFL League One
23	Wigan Athletic (R)	46	15	14	17	57	56	+1	47 (Note: As a result of Wigan Athletic entering administration, the club was subject to a 12-point deduction. In accordance with EFL regulations, the timing of the sporting sanction was only determined once final league placings in the Championship were determined. Since the club did not finish in the relegation places at the end of season, the sanction was applied to their 2019–20 total and final league standings were amended as appropriate.)	Relegation to EFL League One
24	Hull City (R)	46	12	9	25	57	87	−30	45	Relegation to EFL League One

Source: EFL Official Website
Rules for classification: 1) Points; 2) Goal difference; 3) Number of goals scored; 4) Head-to-head results; 5) Wins; 6) Away goals; 7) Penalty points (sec 9.5); 8) 12-point sending off offences
(R) Relegated

==== Results by matchday ====
Matchday	1	2	3	4	5	6	7	8	9	10	11	12	13	14	15	16	17	18	19	20	21	22	23	24	25	26	27	28	29	30	31	32	33	34	35	36	37	38	39	40	41	42	43	44	45	46
Ground	A	H	A	H	H	A	H	A	H	H	A	H	A	H	A	H	A	H	A	H	A	A	H	H	A	A	H	A	A	H	A	A	H	A	H	H	A	H	A	H	A	A	H	A	H	A
Result	L	W	D	L	L	D	D	W	D	W	L	L	W	W	W	L	D	W	L	W	L	D	W	L	W	W	L	L	L	L	D	L	D	L	L	L	L	L	D	W	L	L	L	L	L	L
Position	18	13	10	18	20	20	20	14	16	12	16	19	15	12	11	12	14	9	12	12	13	13	11	14	12	8	11	12	13	14	14	15	15	17	17	18	21	22	21	19	21	22	22	22	24	24

Updated to match(es) played on 22 July 2020. Source: BBC Sport
A = Away; H = Home; W = Win; D = Draw; L = Loss

==== Result summary ====
Overall								Home						Away					
Pld	W	D	L	GF	GA	GD	Pts	W	D	L	GF	GA	GD	W	D	L	GF	GA	GD
46	12	9	25	57	87	−30	45	7	3	13	29	37	−8	5	6	12	28	50	−22

Last updated: 22 July 2020.
Source: BBC Sport

==== Matches ====
On Thursday, 20 June 2019, the EFL Championship fixtures were revealed, and Hull started the campaign away to Swansea City on 3 August 2019. The season should have concluded on 2 May 2020 with another away trip, this time to Cardiff City, but because of the COVID-19 pandemic this did not take place until 22 July 2020.

Win Draw Loss Postponed

3 August 2019 1	Swansea City	2–1	Hull City	Landore, Swansea
15:00 BST	Celina (yellow card) 10'; Bastón 47' van der Hoorn 49'; Bidwell (yellow card) 88'	Report	Batty 3'; Eaves (yellow card) 74'; Lichaj (yellow card) 90+6'	Stadium: Liberty Stadium; Attendance: 15,741; Referee: John Brooks

10 August 2019 2	Hull City	2–1	Reading	Kingston upon Hull
15:00 BST	Bowen 6'; Irvine 16' de Wijs (yellow card) 30'; Kingsley (yellow card) 90'	Report	Boyé (yellow card) 39'; Yiadom (yellow card) 60'; João 66'	Stadium: KCOM Stadium; Attendance: 10,673; Referee: Matt Donohue

17 August 2019 3	Brentford	1–1	Hull City	Brentford
15:00 BST	Watkins 72'; Jeanvier (yellow card) 83'	Report	Bowen 53'; Burke (yellow card) 64'	Stadium: Griffin Park; Attendance: 11,000; Referee: Darren England

20 August 2019 4	Hull City	0–1	Blackburn Rovers	Kingston upon Hull
19:45 BST	Stewart (yellow card) 38'; Eaves (yellow card) 53'; Kingsley (yellow card) 61'; Bowler (yellow card) 80'	Report	Williams 62'; Lenihan (yellow card) 81'	Stadium: KCOM Stadium; Attendance: 10,240; Referee: Jeremy Simpson
Note: Live on Sky Sports

24 August 2019 5	Hull City	1–3	Bristol City	Kingston upon Hull
15:00 BST	Bowen 44'	Report	Rowe (yellow card) 35'; Afobe 41' (pen.), 80'; Palmer (yellow card) 63'; Burke 78' (o.g.); Weimann (yellow card) 87'	Stadium: KCOM Stadium; Attendance: 10,458; Referee: Dean Whitestone

31 August 2019 6	Millwall	1–1	Hull City	Bermondsey
15:00 BST	J. Wallace 10' (pen.); M. Wallace (yellow card) 58'; Böðvarsson (yellow card) 90+2'	Report	de Wijs (yellow card) 10'; Grosicki 18'; Bowen (yellow card) 54'; Magennis (yellow card) 84' (yellow-red card) 90+3'; Lichaj (yellow card) 90+2'; Long (yellow card) 90+3'	Stadium: The Den; Attendance: 12,495; Referee: Oliver Langford

14 September 2019 7	Hull City	2–2	Wigan Athletic	Kingston upon Hull
15:00 BST	Bowen 10'; Grosicki 20', (yellow card) 64'; Elder (yellow card) 90+4'	Report	Dunkley 8', (yellow card) 62'; Byrne (yellow card) 19'; Morsy (yellow card) 23'; Mulgrew (yellow card) 69'; Gelhardt 75'; Garner (yellow card) 83'; Robinson (yellow card) 90+3'	Stadium: KCOM Stadium; Attendance: 10,069; Referee: Gavin Ward

21 September 2019 8	Luton Town	0–3	Hull City	Luton
15:00 BST		Report	Stewart 63', 90' (Note: The third goal of the Luton Town match was originally credited as an own goal by Dan Potts, but was later officially awarded to Kevin Stewart.); Grosicki 87', (yellow card) 88'; Honeyman (yellow card) 89'	Stadium: Kenilworth Road; Attendance: 10,066; Referee: Andy Madley

28 September 2019 9	Hull City	2–2	Cardiff City	Kingston upon Hull
15:00 BST	Stewart (yellow card) 23'; Grosicki 44' de Wijs 89'; Burke (yellow card) 90+4'	Report	Glatzel 55'; Ward 90+2'	Stadium: KCOM Stadium; Attendance: 10,756; Referee: Jarred Gillett

1 October 2019 10	Hull City	1–0	Sheffield Wednesday	Kingston upon Hull
19:45 BST	Eaves 72'; Bowen (yellow card) 86'	Report	Hutchinson (yellow card) 43'; Harris (yellow card) 56'; Nuhiu (yellow card) 58'	Stadium: KCOM Stadium; Attendance: 11,590; Referee: Andy Davies

5 October 2019 11	Huddersfield Town	3–0	Hull City	Huddersfield
15:00 BST	Hogg (yellow card) 32'; Brown (yellow card) 63'; Grant 68'; Bacuna 74'; Kachunga 82'; O'Brien (yellow card) 90+1'	Report	Magennis (yellow card) 90+1'	Stadium: Kirklees Stadium; Attendance: 21,702; Referee: David Webb

19 October 2019 12	Hull City	2–3	Queens Park Rangers	Kingston upon Hull
15:00 BST	Bowen 29'; Magennis 90+6'; Bowler (yellow card) 90+10'	Report	Manning 44'; Eze 78' (pen.), 88' (pen.)	Stadium: KCOM Stadium; Attendance: 10,285; Referee: Tony Harrington

23 October 2019 13	Nottingham Forest	1–2	Hull City	West Bridgford
19:45 BST	Silva (yellow card) 15'; Robinson (yellow card) 40'; Cash 52'; Samba (yellow card) 90+6'	Report	Magennis 38', (red card) 58'; Bowen 48', (yellow card) 88'; Long (yellow card) 89'	Stadium: City Ground; Attendance: 27,624; Referee: Oliver Langford

26 October 2019 14	Hull City	2–0	Derby County	Kingston upon Hull
15:00 BST	Irvine (yellow card) 11'; Bowler (yellow card) 44' de Wijs (yellow card) 45+1'; Elder (yellow card) 63'; Bowen 74', 80'	Report	Holmes (yellow card) 53'	Stadium: KCOM Stadium; Attendance: 16,326; Referee: Simon Hooper

2 November 2019 15	Fulham	0–3	Hull City	Fulham
15:00 GMT	Reed (yellow card) 37'; Johansen (yellow card) 74'	Report	Bowler 9'; Irvine (yellow card) 44'; Bowen 57'; Eaves 84'; Eaves (yellow card) 90'	Stadium: Craven Cottage; Attendance: 18,168; Referee: Keith Stroud

9 November 2019 16	Hull City	0–1	West Bromwich Albion	Kingston upon Hull
15:00 GMT	Eaves (yellow card) 69' de Wijs (yellow card) 87'; Lichaj (yellow card) 90+3'	Report	Livermore (yellow card) 16', (goal) 28'; Sawyers (yellow card) 90'; Johnstone (yellow card) 90+1'	Stadium: KCOM Stadium; Attendance: 13,866; Referee: James Linington

24 November 2019 17	Middlesbrough	2–2	Hull City	Middlesbrough
12:00 GMT	Tavernier 7'; Fletcher 26'; Johnson (red card) 37'; Clayton (yellow card) 55'; Dijksteel (yellow card) 90+3'	Report	de Wijs (yellow card) 65'; Eaves 71' (Note: The first Hull City goal of the Middlesbrough match was originally credited to Jarrod Bowen, but was later officially awarded to Tom Eaves by the Dubious Goals Committee.); Bowen 75'	Stadium: Riverside Stadium; Attendance: 18,596; Referee: Jeremy Simpson

27 November 2019 18	Hull City	4–0	Preston North End	Kingston upon Hull
19:45 GMT	Bowen 30', 77'; Magennis 48' (pen.); Grosicki 51'; Batty (yellow card) 65'	Report	Gallagher (yellow card) 56'	Stadium: KCOM Stadium; Attendance: 9,826; Referee: Jonathan Moss

30 November 2019 19	Barnsley	3–1	Hull City	Barnsley
15:00 GMT	Mowatt 23'; Bähre 75'; Chaplin 90+5'	Report	Burke (yellow card) 60'; Lewis-Potter 81'	Stadium: Oakwell; Attendance: 13,598; Referee: John Brooks

7 December 2019 20	Hull City	2–1	Stoke City	Kingston upon Hull
15:00 GMT	Bowen 49', 56'	Report	Vokes 7'	Stadium: KCOM Stadium; Attendance: 11,019; Referee: Darren Bond

10 December 2019 21	Leeds United	2–0	Hull City	Leeds
19:45 GMT	Phillips (yellow card) 61' de Wijs 73' (o.g.); White (yellow card) 79'; Alioski 82'	Report	Honeyman (yellow card) 90+4'	Stadium: Elland Road; Attendance: 35,200; Referee: David Webb

13 December 2019 22	Charlton Athletic	2–2	Hull City	Charlton
19:45 GMT	Matthews (yellow card) 20'; Pratley 34'; Sarr 50'; Leko (yellow card) 90+5'	Report	Bowen 47' da Silva Lopes (yellow card) 66'; Irvine (yellow card) 86'; Phillips 90+6' (o.g.)	Stadium: The Valley; Attendance: 14,447; Referee: Andy Davies

21 December 2019 23	Hull City	3–0	Birmingham City	Kingston upon Hull
15:00 GMT	Irvine (yellow card) 28'; Eaves 45+1'; Burke (yellow card) 51'; Grosicki 58'; Lewis-Potter 88'	Report	McEachran (yellow card) 64'; Crowley (yellow card) 85'	Stadium: KCOM Stadium; Attendance: 11,334; Referee: Anthony Backhouse

26 December 2019 24	Hull City	0–2	Nottingham Forest	Kingston upon Hull
15:00 GMT	Lopes (yellow card) 73'; Kingsley (yellow card) 77'; Bowen (yellow card) 87' de Wijs (yellow card) 90+3'	Report	Chema (yellow card) 4'; Grabban 11' (pen.), 82'; Watson (yellow card) 87'	Stadium: KCOM Stadium; Attendance: 15,001; Referee: Geoff Eltringham

29 December 2019 25	Queens Park Rangers	1–2	Hull City	Shepherd's Bush, London
15:00 GMT	Chair 20'	Report	Honeyman 32', (yellow card) 75' de Wijs (yellow card) 64'; Irvine 89'	Stadium: Loftus Road; Attendance: 13,814; Referee: Gavin Ward

1 January 2020 26	Sheffield Wednesday	0–1	Hull City	Owlerton
15:00 GMT	Börner (yellow card) 26'; Bannan (yellow card) 90'	Report	Bowen 61'; Grosicki (yellow card) 79'	Stadium: Hillsborough; Attendance: 24,842; Referee: Jeremy Simpson

11 January 2020 27	Hull City	0–1	Fulham	Kingston upon Hull
15:00 GMT	Bowen (yellow card) 67'	Report	Cavaleiro 29', (yellow card) 71'; Mitrović (yellow card) 73'; McDonald (yellow card) 86'; Christie (yellow card) 90+4'	Stadium: KCOM Stadium; Attendance: 11,347; Referee: Matt Donohue

18 January 2020 28	Derby County	1–0	Hull City	Derby
15:00 GMT	Clarke 64'; Knight (yellow card) 78'; Wisdom (yellow card) 81'; Lawrence (yellow card) 86'	Report		Stadium: Pride Park Stadium; Attendance: 27,412; Referee: Andy Woolmer

28 January 2020 29	Hull City	1–2	Huddersfield Town	Kingston upon Hull
19:45 GMT	Stearman 66' (o.g.)	Report	Grant 24'; Grabara (yellow card) 66'; Mounié 90+6'	Stadium: KCOM Stadium; Attendance: 10,474; Referee: Steve Martin

1 February 2020 30	Hull City	1–5	Brentford	Kingston upon Hull
12:30 GMT	Raya 29' (o.g.)	Report	Benrahma 12', 63', 85' (yellow card) 13'; Burke 20' (o.g.); Watkins 58'	Stadium: KCOM Stadium; Attendance: 10,034; Referee: Darren Bond

8 February 2020 31	Reading	1–1	Hull City	Reading, Berkshire
15:00 GMT	Obita 56'; Aluko (yellow card) 85'	Report	da Silva Lopes (yellow card) 48'; McLoughlin (yellow card) 71'; Wilks 82'; Irvine (yellow card) 88'	Stadium: Madejski Stadium; Attendance: 13,393; Referee: Andy Davies

11 February 2020 32	Blackburn Rovers	3–0	Hull City	Blackburn
19:45 GMT	Lenihan 73'; Armstrong 79'; Samuel 80'; Travis (yellow card) 89'	Report	Elder (yellow card) 36'; Honeyman (yellow card) 86'	Stadium: Ewood Park; Attendance: 11,888; Referee: Jeremy Simpson

14 February 2020 33	Hull City	4–4	Swansea City	Kingston upon Hull
19:45 GMT	Lopes 6'; Maddison 50'; Wilks 61'; Eaves 90+5'	Report	Routledge 13'; Wilmot (yellow card) 36'; Naughton 55'; Garrick 77'; Brewster 84' (yellow card) 85'; Ayew (yellow card) 84'	Stadium: KCOM Stadium; Attendance: 9,757; Referee: David Webb

22 February 2020 34	Preston North End	2–1	Hull City	Deepdale, Preston
15:00 GMT	Gallagher 67' (pen.); Browne 71'; Stockley (yellow card) 90+7'	Report	Wilks 40'; Honeyman (yellow card) 56'; Pennington (yellow card) 81' de Wijs (yellow card) 90+3'	Stadium: Deepdale; Attendance: 12,342; Referee: Steve Martin

26 February 2020 35	Hull City	0–1	Barnsley	Kingston upon Hull
19:45 GMT	Irvine (yellow card) 49'	Report	Halme (yellow card) 41'; Woodrow 42'	Stadium: KCOM Stadium; Attendance: 10,272; Referee: David Coote

29 February 2020 36	Hull City	0–4	Leeds United	Kingston upon Hull
12:30 GMT	McLoughlin (yellow card) 50'; Magennis (yellow card) 52'	Report	Ayling 5'; Hernández 47'; Bamford (yellow card) 50'; Roberts 81', 84'	Stadium: KCOM Stadium; Attendance: 16,178; Referee: Keith Stroud

7 March 2020 37	Stoke City	5–1	Hull City	Stoke-on-Trent
15:00 GMT	Powell 11', 86'; Campbell 16'; Clucas 18', 50'	Report	Stewart (yellow card) 7' da Silva Lopes 73', (yellow card) 76'	Stadium: bet365 Stadium; Attendance: 23,126; Referee: Tim Robinson

20 June 2020 38	Hull City	0–1	Charlton Athletic	Kingston upon Hull
15:00 BST	Batty (yellow card) 45+3'	Report	Pearce 18'; Oshilaja (yellow card) 39'; Williams (yellow card) 90'; Pratley (yellow card) 90+2'	Stadium: KCOM Stadium; Attendance: 0 Referee: Darren England
Note: Held behind closed doors.

27 June 2020 39	Birmingham City	3–3	Hull City	Bordesley, Birmingham
15:00 BST	Gardner (yellow card) 45', (goal) 47', 88'; Crowley 60'; Clarke-Salter (yellow card) 66'; Dean (yellow card) 76'	Report	Magennis 2'; Scott 16'; Kane 67'	Stadium: St Andrew's; Attendance: 0 Referee: Dean Whitestone
Note: Held behind closed doors.

2 July 2020 40	Hull City	2–1	Middlesbrough	Kingston upon Hull
17:00 BST	Kane 8'; Wilks (yellow card) 45+3', (goal) 90+1'	Report	Assombalonga 4' (pen.); Tavernier (yellow card) 90+5'	Stadium: KCOM Stadium; Attendance: 0 Referee: Geoff Eltringham
Note: Held behind closed doors.

5 July 2020 41	West Bromwich Albion	4–2	Hull City	West Bromwich
15:00 BST	Austin 4'; Hegazi (yellow card) 12' (yellow-red card) 90+2' (goal) 37'; Grosicki 49'; Diangana 76'; Bartley (yellow card) 78'	Report	Stewart 24'; Wilks 48'; Toral (yellow card) 79'	Stadium: The Hawthorns; Attendance: 0 Referee: Oliver Langford
Note: Held behind closed doors.

8 July 2020 42	Bristol City	2–1	Hull City	Ashton Gate, Bristol
18:00 BST	Diédhiou 41'; Paterson 53'	Report	Honeyman (yellow card) 22'; De Wijs 60' (yellow card) 90+4'; Wilks (yellow card) 90+2'	Stadium: Ashton Gate Stadium; Attendance: 0 Referee: Gavin Ward
Note: Held behind closed doors.

11 July 2020 43	Hull City	0–1	Millwall	Kingston upon Hull
15:00 BST	Stewart (yellow card) 40'; Honeyman (yellow card) 45+1'	Report	Leonard 2'	Stadium: KCOM Stadium; Attendance: 0 Referee: Matt Donohue
Note: Held behind closed doors.

14 July 2020 44	Wigan Athletic	8–0	Hull City	Wigan
18:00 BST	Naismith 1'; Moore 27', 40'; Dowell 32', 42', 65'; Lowe 37'; Williams 45+1'	Report	Honeyman (yellow card) 33'; Toral (yellow card) 45'	Stadium: DW Stadium; Attendance: 0 Referee: Tony Harrington
Note: Held behind closed doors.

18 July 2020 45	Hull City	0–1	Luton Town	Kingston upon Hull
15:00 BST	Lopes (yellow card) 60'	Report	Collins (yellow card) 56'; Rea (yellow card) 73'; LuaLua 85'	Stadium: KCOM Stadium; Attendance: 0 Referee: Robert Jones
Note: Held behind closed doors.

22 July 2020 46	Cardiff City	3–0	Hull City	Cardiff
19:30 BST	Hoilett 20'; Morrison 34'; Ward 83'	Report		Stadium: Cardiff City Stadium; Attendance: 0 Referee: James Linington
Note: Held behind closed doors.

=== FA Cup ===
Hull City enter the competition at the third round stage, the draw for which took place on 2 December 2019. Hull were drawn away to either Solihull Moors or Rotherham United with the match to be played the first weekend in January 2020. The second round replay between Solihull Moors and Rotherham United took place later the same day as the third round draw and Rotherham United fought back to beat Solihull Moors 4–3 to progress to play Hull.

The third-round match took place on 4 January 2020, and Tom Eaves gave Hull the lead after 16 minutes but Michael Smith struck back 4 minutes later. After 24 minutes Rotherham defender Adam Thompson brought down Keane Lewis-Potter and was sent off. Just before half-time Kyle Vassell scored to give Rotherham the lead. Eaves headed in his second of the match after 66 minutes and scored his hat-trick in added time to put Hull through to the fourth-round. The draw for the fourth-round took place on 6 January 2020 and Hull were drawn at home to Chelsea. The match being selected for live coverage by BT Sport was played at 5:30 p.m. on 25 January 2020. The match was a sell-out with the match seeing the biggest cup crowd at the KCOM Stadium and the largest since January 1973 against West Ham United at Boothferry Park.

Hull city started the match brightly but Chelsea scored an early goal when a shot from Michy Batshuayi was deflected in by Ryan Tafazolli. In the second half Fikayo Tomori knocked in a free-kick by Ross Barkley to double the visitors tally. Hull replied through substitute Kamil Grosicki's free-kick that was deflected into the goal off the wall. Hull pressed but could not convert any further chances they had so Chelsea progressed to the Fifth round.

Win Draw Loss Postponed

4 January 2020 Third round	Rotherham United	2–3	Hull City	Rotherham
12:31 GMT	Smith 20'; Thompson (red card) 24'; Vassell 43'; Ihiekwe (yellow card) 72'	Report	Eaves 16', 66', 90+2', (yellow card) 90+3'; Lopes (yellow card) 86'	Stadium: New York Stadium; Attendance: 6,044; Referee: Anthony Backhouse

25 January 2020 Fourth round	Hull City	1–2	Chelsea	Kingston upon Hull
17:30 GMT	Lichaj (yellow card) 63'; Grosicki 78'	Report	Batshuayi 6'; Kovačić (yellow card) 46'; Tomori 64'; Zouma (yellow card) 90'	Stadium: KCOM Stadium; Attendance: 24,109; Referee: Craig Pawson

=== EFL Cup ===
The first round draw was made on 20 June 2019. Hull were in the Northern Section of the draw and were drawn away to Tranmere Rovers, the match to take place on 13 August 2019 at Prenton Park. The match started with Jon Toral heading a goal for Hull after just 19 seconds, with David Milinković knocking in a rebound five-minutes later. Hull made it 0–3 just before half-time when Ryan Tafazolli headed home a cross from Milinković. The nearest Tranmere got was in the second-half when Morgan Ferrier hit the crossbar. The draw took place on 13 August 2019 for the Second round and Hull were drawn away to Preston North End, the match to take place on 27 August 2019. Preston opened the scoring after 20-minutes through Paul Huntington and doubled their advantage 6 minutes later through Josh Harrop. Hull cut the lead when Josh Magennis scored a penalty after 34-minutes, a last minute Jarrod Bowen equaliser sent the game to penalties. Preston scored 5 of their spot kicks but Hull only managed 4 with Tom Eaves failing to score. Preston progressed to the next round.

Win Draw Loss Postponed

13 August 2019 First round	Tranmere Rovers	0–3	Hull City	Birkenhead
19:45 BST	Ray (yellow card) 74'	Report	Toral 1'; Milinković 6'; Tafazolli 45'	Stadium: Prenton Park; Attendance: 3,421; Referee: Seb Stockbridge

27 August 2019 Second round	Preston North End	2–2 (5–4 p)	Hull City	Preston
19:45 BST	Huntington 20'; Harrop 26'	Report	Magennis 34' (pen.); Bowen 90+5'	Stadium: Deepdale; Attendance: 6,093; Referee: David Webb
	Penalties
	Harrop (penalty scored); Ledson (penalty scored); Stockley (penalty scored); Bodin (penalty scored); Browne (penalty scored)		(penalty scored) Magennis; (penalty missed) Eaves; (penalty scored) Toral; (penalty scored) Lopes; (penalty scored) Stewart

== Statistics ==
=== Appearances ===
As of 22 July 2020.

No.	Pos	Nat	Player	Total		Championship		FA Cup		League Cup	
No.	Pos	Nat	Player	Apps	Goals	Apps	Goals	Apps	Goals	Apps	Goals
1	GK	(England) ENG	George Long	46	0	45	0	1	0	0	0
2	DF	(United States) USA	Eric Lichaj	30	0	29	0	1	0	0	0
3	DF	(England) ENG	Ryan Tafazolli	19	1	7+8	0	2	0	2	1
4	DF	(Netherlands) NED	Jordy de Wijs	35	2	35	2	0	0	0	0
5	DF	(England) ENG	Reece Burke	38	0	36	0	2	0	0	0
6	MF	(England) ENG	Kevin Stewart	28	3	21+6	3	0	0	0+1	0
7	MF	(Serbia) SRB	David Milinković	1	1	0	0	0	0	1	1
8	MF	(England) ENG	Daniel Batty	32	1	18+11	1	1	0	1+1	0
9	FW	(England) ENG	Tom Eaves	44	8	22+18	5	2	3	0+2	0
10	MF	(Spain) ESP	Jon Toral	16	1	8+6	0	0	0	2	1
11	MF	(England) ENG	Marcus Maddison	7	1	4+3	1	0	0	0	0
12	GK	(England) ENG	Will Mannion	0	0	0	0	0	0	0	0
13	GK	(England) ENG	Matt Ingram	4	0	1	0	1	0	2	0
14	FW	(Mali) MLI	Nouha Dicko	4	0	1+1	0	0	0	1+1	0
15	DF	(England) ENG	Angus MacDonald	5	0	5	0	0	0	0	0
16	DF	(England) ENG	Robbie McKenzie	12	0	8	0	2	0	2	0
17	DF	(Republic of Ireland) IRL	Sean McLoughlin	7	0	5+2	0	0	0	0	0
18	MF	(England) ENG	George Honeyman	44	1	22+20	1	1	0	1	0
19	MF	(England) ENG	Josh Bowler	31	1	11+17	1	1	0	2	0
21	DF	(England) ENG	Brandon Fleming	7	0	4	0	1	0	2	0
22	MF	(Norway) NOR	Markus Henriksen	0	0	0	0	0	0	0	0
23	DF	(Scotland) SCO	Stephen Kingsley	8	0	7+1	0	0	0	0	0
24	FW	(Hungary) HUN	Norbert Balogh	3	0	0+3	0	0	0	0	0
25	DF	(England) ENG	Matthew Pennington	16	0	13+1	0	0	0	2	0
26	DF	(Australia) AUS	Callum Elder	30	0	30	0	0	0	0	0
27	FW	(Northern Ireland) NIR	Josh Magennis	32	5	20+9	4	0+1	0	2	1
29	DF	(England) ENG	Lewis Ritson	0	0	0	0	0	0	0	0
30	DF	(England) ENG	Jacob Greaves	0	0	0	0	0	0	0	0
31	FW	(England) ENG	Keane Lewis-Potter	22	2	1+20	2	1	0	0	0
32	MF	(England) ENG	Billy Chadwick	0	0	0	0	0	0	0	0
33	MF	(England) ENG	Ahmed Salam	0	0	0	0	0	0	0	0
34	MF	(England) ENG	Tyler Hamilton	0	0	0	0	0	0	0	0
35	DF	(England) ENG	Matty Jacob	0	0	0	0	0	0	0	0
36	MF	(Australia) AUS	Jackson Irvine	36	2	34+1	2	0+1	0	0	0
37	MF	(Portugal) POR	Leonardo Lopes	44	2	33+7	2	2	0	2	0
40	FW	(England) ENG	James Berry	0	0	0	0	0	0	0	0
41	MF	(England) ENG	Herbie Kane	9	2	6+1	2	2	0	0	0
42	MF	(Norway) NOR	Martin Samuelsen	8	0	3+4	0	0+1	0	0	0
43	FW	(England) ENG	Mallik Wilks	19	5	16+2	5	1	0	0	0
44	FW	(Scotland) SCO	James Scott	7	1	4+3	1	0	0	0	0
Players who played for Hull City but subsequently left the club:
11	MF	(Poland) POL	Kamil Grosicki	30	7	28	6	0+2	1	0	0
20	FW	(England) ENG	Jarrod Bowen	32	17	29	16	1+1	0	0+1	1

- Source: Compiled from competitive match reports

Note: Appearances shown after a "+" indicate player came on during course of match.

=== Top goalscorers ===
Player	Number	Position	Championship	FA Cup	League Cup	Total
(England) Jarrod Bowen	20	FW	16	0	1	17
(England) Tom Eaves	9	FW	5	3	0	8
(Poland) Kamil Grosicki	11	MF	6	1	0	7
(England) Mallik Wilks	43	FW	5	0	0	5
(Northern Ireland) Josh Magennis	27	FW	4	0	1	5
(England) Kevin Stewart	6	MF	3	0	0	3
(Netherlands) Jordy de Wijs	4	DF	2	0	0	2
(Australia) Jackson Irvine	36	MF	2	0	0	2
(England) Herbie Kane	41	MF	2	0	0	2
(England) Keane Lewis-Potter	31	FW	2	0	0	2
(Portugal) Leo Lopes	37	MF	2	0	0	2
(England) Daniel Batty	8	MF	1	0	0	1
(England) Josh Bowler	19	MF	1	0	0	1
(England) George Honeyman	18	MF	1	0	0	1
(England) Marcus Maddison	11	MF	1	0	0	1
(Serbia) David Milinković	7	MF	0	0	1	1
(Scotland) James Scott	44	FW	1	0	0	1
(England) Ryan Tafazolli	3	DF	0	0	1	1
(Spain) Jon Toral	10	MF	0	0	1	1
Total			54	4	5	63

=== Disciplinary record ===
Player	Number	Position	Championship		FA Cup		League Cup		Total	
Player	Number	Position	Yellow card	Red card	Yellow card	Red card	Yellow card	Red card	Yellow card	Red card
(Northern Ireland) Josh Magennis	27	FW	3	2	0	0	0	0	3	2
(Netherlands) Jordy de Wijs	4	DF	9	0	0	0	0	0	9	0
(England) George Honeyman	18	MF	8	0	0	0	0	0	8	0
(Australia) Jackson Irvine	36	MF	6	0	0	0	0	0	6	0
(Portugal) Leo Lopes	37	MF	5	0	1	0	0	0	6	0
(England) Jarrod Bowen	20	FW	5	0	0	0	0	0	5	0
(England) Tom Eaves	9	FW	4	0	1	0	0	0	5	0
(England) Reece Burke	5	DF	4	0	0	0	0	0	4	0
(England) Kevin Stewart	6	MF	4	0	0	0	0	0	4	0
(England) Eric Lichaj	2	DF	3	0	1	0	0	0	4	0
(England) Josh Bowler	19	MF	3	0	0	0	0	0	3	0
(Australia) Callum Elder	26	DF	3	0	0	0	0	0	3	0
(Poland) Kamil Grosicki	11	MF	3	0	0	0	0	0	3	0
(Scotland) Stephen Kingsley	23	DF	3	0	0	0	0	0	3	0
(England) Daniel Batty	8	MF	2	0	0	0	0	0	2	0
(England) George Long	1	GK	2	0	0	0	0	0	2	0
(Republic of Ireland) Sean McLoughlin	17	DF	2	0	0	0	0	0	2	0
(England) Mallik Wilks	43	FW	2	0	0	0	0	0	2	0
(Spain) Jon Toral	10	MF	2	0	0	0	0	0	2	0
(England) Matthew Pennington	25	DF	1	0	0	0	0	0	1	0
Total			74	2	3	0	0	0	77	2

== Kits ==
The home kit for the 2019–20 season was unveiled on 14 June 2019, manufactured by Umbro, the shirt is amber with a tiger pattern on the upper front, together with the new crest. This will be complemented by black with amber trim shorts and amber socks with black "Tigers" lettering. The away kit was revealed on 9 July 2019 as a white shirt with black trim to the collar and black and amber trim to the sleeves. The shorts are white with amber trim. The socks are white with black top and amber detail. The third kit was revealed on 13 August 2019 as a deep lagoon colour with amber trim. The shorts are in medieval blue with amber contrast side panels, with deep lagoon socks with navy turnover and amber Tigers lettering. On 11 September 2019, the club announced a new back-of-shirt sponsor, On Line Group, who have agreed a 3-year sponsorship deal.
