= 2015–16 Under-21 Premier League Cup =

2015–16 Barclays Under-21 Premier League Cup
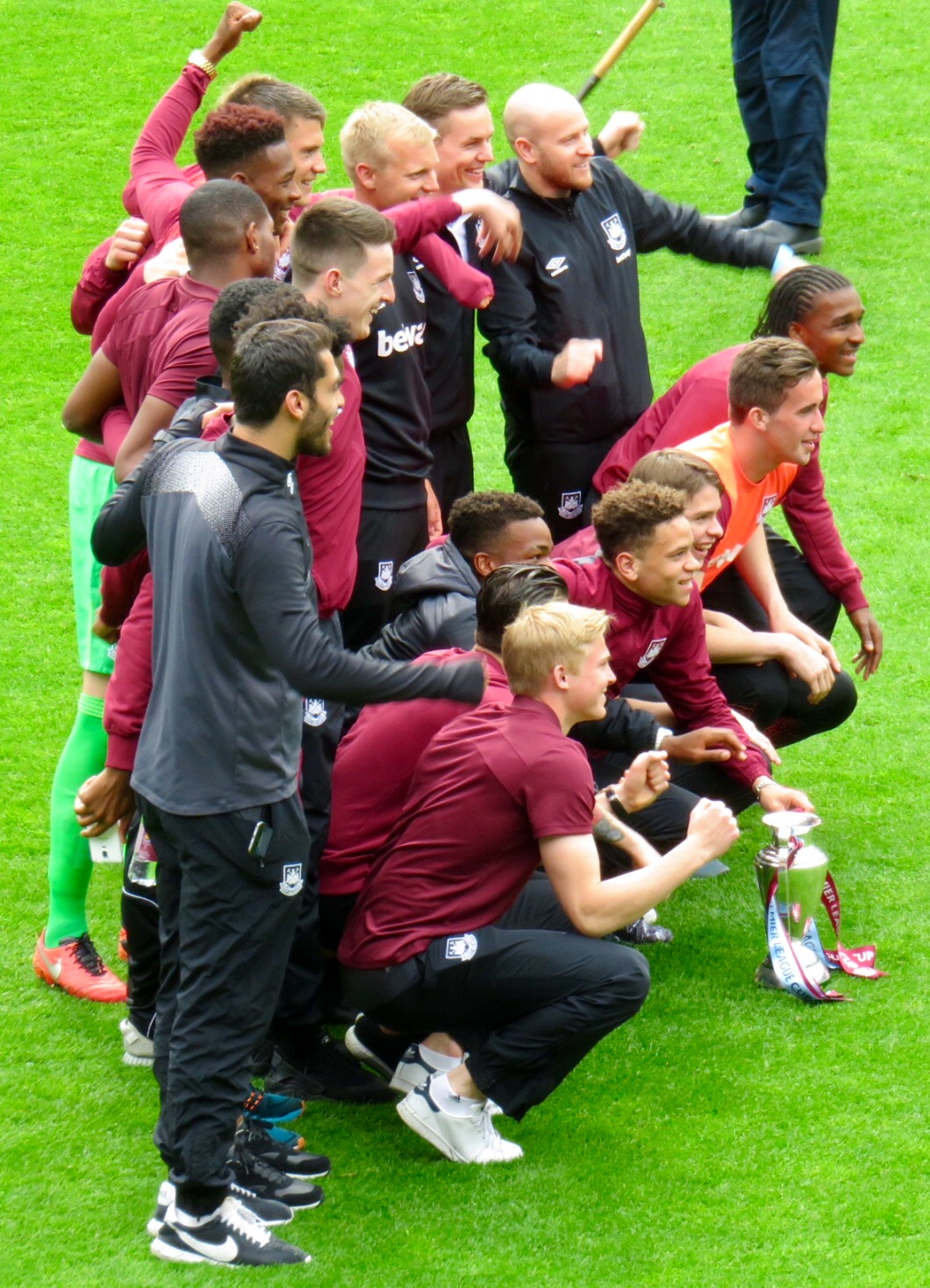
- West Ham United with the trophy.

Tournament details
- Country: England; Wales
- Teams: 49

Final positions
- Champions: West Ham United (1st Title)
- Runners-up: Hull City (1st Runner Up Finish)

Tournament statistics
- Matches played: 49
- Goals scored: 159 (3.24 per match)
- Top goal scorer(s): (England) Ntumba Massanka Burnley (England) Jerome Sinclair Liverpool (England) James Tilley Brighton & Hove Albion (Bermuda) Djair Parfitt-Williams West Ham United (4 Goals Each)

The 2015–16 Under-21 Premier League Cup (known as the Barclays Under-21 Premier League Cup for sponsorship reasons) was the third edition of the U21 Premier League Cup. The competition was won by West Ham United who defeated Hull City 5–3 in a penalty shoot-out after the two-leg final had finished 1–1 on aggregate.

== Participants ==
There was three more participants than the previous competition. Aston Villa, and Manchester City, did not play this year after 2 years in the competition. Meanwhile Chelsea, Exeter City returned after last year's absence. Brentford, Liverpool and Southend United entered the competition for the very first time.

=== Category 1 ===
North	South
Blackburn Rovers	Brighton & Hove Albion
Derby County	Chelsea
Everton	Fulham
Leicester City	Norwich City
Liverpool	Reading
Middlesbrough	Southampton
Newcastle United	Swansea City
Stoke City	West Bromwich Albion
Sunderland	West Ham United
Wolverhampton Wanderers	

=== Category 2 ===
North	South
Barnsley	Brentford
Bolton Wanderers	Bristol City
Crewe Alexandra	Cardiff City
Huddersfield Town	Charlton Athletic
Hull City	Ipswich Town
Leeds United	Millwall
Nottingham Forest	Queens Park Rangers
Sheffield United	Birmingham City
Sheffield Wednesday	Watford
Colchester United

=== Category 3 ===
North	South
Burnley	AFC Wimbledon
Doncaster Rovers	AFC Bournemouth
Preston North End	Exeter City
Wigan Athletic	Gillingham
	Peterborough United
	Plymouth Argyle
	Southend United

== Matches ==
=== First qualifying round ===
This round commences the week beginning 14 September 2015. Peterborough United received a bye.

==== Northern Section ====
Date	Home team	Score	Away team	Att
16 Sep	Doncaster Rovers	1–0	Preston North End	
28 Sep	Burnley	3–0	Wigan Athletic	492

==== Southern Section ====
Date	Home team	Score	Away team	Att
14 Sep	Exeter City	6–0	Southend United	222
15 Sep	Plymouth Argyle	2 – 1†	AFC Wimbledon	
16 Sep	Gillingham	1–2	AFC Bournemouth	

† – After extra time

=== Second qualifying round ===
This round commences the week beginning 5 October 2015. Leeds United were awarded a bye.

==== Northern Section ====
Date	Home team	Score	Away team	Att
12 Oct	Bolton Wanderers	3–4	Sheffield United	
12 Oct	Burnley	3–1	Barnsley	360
13 Oct	Crewe Alexandra	3–2	Doncaster Rovers	
19 Oct	Sheffield Wednesday	2–3	Hull City	119
26 Oct	Huddersfield Town	1–0	Nottingham Forest	

==== Southern Section ====
Date	Home team	Score	Away team	Att
5 Oct	Cardiff City	2 – 1†	Bristol City	
6 Oct	Queens Park Rangers	1–2	Brentford	
8 Oct	Millwall	1–0	Plymouth Argyle	
12 Oct	Colchester United	3–0	AFC Bournemouth	
12 Oct	Ipswich Town	0–3	Charlton Athletic	
13 Oct	Exeter City	1–0	Peterborough United	264
29 Oct	Watford	2–0	Birmingham City	

† – After extra time

=== Round of 32 ===
This round begins the week beginning 9 November 2015. The Category 1 sides were joined in this round by the teams progressing from the Second Qualifying round.

==== Northern Section ====
Date	Home team	Score	Away team	Att
9 Nov	Burnley	1 – 3†	Blackburn Rovers	BCD
9 Nov	Hull City	2–1	Crewe Alexandra	
9 Nov	Wolverhampton Wanderers	2–1	Derby County	125
10 Nov	Stoke City	2–5	Leicester City	
19 Nov	Sheffield United	0–1	Leeds United	
24 Nov	Sunderland	3 – 4†	Liverpool	209
7 Dec	Huddersfield Town	2–1	Middlesbrough	202
14 Jan	Everton	4–3	Newcastle United	

==== Southern Section ====
Date	Home team	Score	Away team	Att
6 Nov	Reading	1–2	Brentford	
10 Nov	Watford	1–2	Charlton Athletic	
12 Nov	Brighton & Hove Albion	4–1	Norwich City	
17 Nov	Cardiff City	0–1	West Bromwich Albion	
23 Nov	Swansea City	1 – 2†	Millwall	
2 Dec	Exeter City	0–4	West Ham United	1,462
8 Dec	Colchester United	1–3	Fulham	
6 Jan	Southampton	1–0	Chelsea	

† – After extra time.

=== Round of 16 ===
This round begins the week beginning 21 December 2015.

Date	Home team	Score	Away team	Att
22 Dec	Wolverhampton Wanderers	1–3	Millwall	109
6 Jan	Charlton Athletic	2–1	Brentford	BCD
13 Jan	West Ham United	3 – 2†	Fulham	
18 Jan	Blackburn Rovers	1–0	Leicester City	

Date	Home team	Score	Away team	Att
18 Jan	West Bromwich Albion	1–2	Hull City	
19 Jan	Liverpool	1–0	Leeds United	
25 Jan	Southampton	0–2	Huddersfield Town	
9 Feb	Everton	2 – 2†	Brighton & Hove Albion	
Brighton & Hove Albion advance 4 – 2 on penalties.

† – After extra time.

=== Quarter-finals ===
Date	Home team	Score	Away team	Att
27 Jan	West Ham United	2 – 1	Blackburn Rovers	680
8 Feb	Huddersfield Town	1 – 1†	Charlton Athletic	261
Huddersfield Town advance 5 – 4 on penalties.

Date	Home team	Score	Away team	Att
14 Feb	Liverpool	4 – 3†	Brighton & Hove Albion	
23 Feb	Millwall	1 – 3	Hull City	

† – After extra time.

=== Semi-finals ===
Date	Home team	Score	Away team	Att
15 Mar	Huddersfield Town	0 – 0†	Hull City	927
Hull City advance 4 – 3 on penalties.

Date	Home team	Score	Away team	Att
16 Mar	West Ham United	3 – 2†	Liverpool	1,319

† – After extra time.

=== Final ===
==== First leg ====
25 Apr 2016
19:00 BST

West Ham United	1–0	Hull City
Parfitt-Williams 90'	Report

Boleyn Ground, London
Attendance: 10,267
Referee: Christopher O'Donnell

West Ham United	Hull City

Note: Flags indicate national team as defined under FIFA eligibility rules; some limited exceptions apply. Players may hold more than one non-FIFA nationality.

West Ham United
No.	Pos.	Nation	Player
—	GK	SUI	Raphael Spiegel
—	DF	ENG	Sam Byram (yellow card) 87'
—	DF	ENG	Lewis Page
—	DF	ENG	George Dobson (substituted off) 60'
—	DF	CAN	Doneil Henry
—	DF	ENG	Reece Oxford (c) (yellow card) 35'
—	MF	NOR	Martin Samuelsen
—	MF	IRL	Josh Cullen
—	FW	ENG	Jahmal Hector-Ingram (substituted off) 60'
—	MF	ENG	Marcus Browne
—	DF	SCO	Stephen Hendrie (substituted off) 60'
Sub	GK	ENG	Sam Howes
Sub	DF	ENG	Alex Pike
Sub	MF	COD	Grady Diangana (substituted on) 60'
Sub	MF	ENG	Moses Makasi (substituted on) 60'
Sub	FW	BER	Djair Parfitt-Williams (substituted on) 60'

Hull City
No.	Pos.	Nation	Player
1	GK	ENG	Rory Watson
2	DF	IRL	Brian Lenihan
3	DF	ENG	Josh Tymon
4	DF	ENG	Max Clark (c)
5	DF	ENG	Harvey Rodgers
6	MF	ENG	Ben Clappison
7	MF	ENG	Tyler Hamilton
8	MF	ENG	Robbie McKenzie
9	FW	ENG	Ben Hinchliffe
10	MF	ENG	Greg Olley
11	MF	ENG	Jarrod Bowen
Sub		ENG	Jonathan Saltmer
Sub		ENG	Adam Curry
Sub		SCO	Will Annan
Sub		ENG	Daniel Batty
Sub		ENG	Josh Clackstone

==== Second leg ====
4 May 2016
19:00 BST

Hull City	1–0 (a.e.t.)	West Ham United
Annan 90+3'	Report
Penalties
Bowen (penalty scored); Batty (penalty missed); Lenihan (penalty scored); Hamilton (penalty scored)	3–5	(penalty scored) Browne; (penalty scored) Oxford; (penalty scored) Byram; (penalty scored) Hendrie; (penalty scored) Samuelsen

KC Stadium, Kingston upon Hull
Attendance: 3,886

Hull City	West Ham United

Note: Flags indicate national team as defined under FIFA eligibility rules; some limited exceptions apply. Players may hold more than one non-FIFA nationality.

Hull City
No.	Pos.	Nation	Player
1	GK	ENG	Rory Watson
2	DF	IRL	Brian Lenihan
3	DF	ENG	Josh Tymon
4	DF	ENG	Max Clark (c)
5	DF	ENG	Harvey Rodgers (yellow card) 39'
6	MF	ENG	Ben Clappison (yellow card) 22'
7		SCO	Will Annan
8	MF	ENG	Robbie McKenzie (substituted off) 85'
9	FW	ENG	Ben Hinchliffe (substituted off) 72'
10	MF	ENG	Greg Olley (substituted off) 80'
11	MF	ENG	Jarrod Bowen
Sub	GK	ENG	Jonathan Saltmer
Sub	FW	ENG	Johan Ter Horst (substituted on) 72'
Sub		ENG	Josh Clackstone
Sub		ENG	Daniel Batty (substituted on) 85'
Sub	MF	ENG	Tyler Hamilton (substituted on) 80'

West Ham United
No.	Pos.	Nation	Player
—	GK	SUI	Raphael Spiegel
—	DF	ENG	Sam Byram (yellow card) 42'
—	DF	ENG	Lewis Page
—	MF	ENG	Declan Rice (substituted off) 100'
—	DF	CAN	Doneil Henry (yellow card) 33'
—	DF	ENG	Reece Oxford (c) (yellow card) 59'
—	MF	COD	Grady Diangana (substituted off) 60'
—	MF	ENG	Moses Makasi
—	MF	NOR	Martin Samuelsen
—	MF	ENG	Marcus Browne (yellow card) 116'
—	FW	BER	Djair Parfitt-Williams (substituted off) 68'
Sub	GK	ENG	Sam Howes
Sub	DF	SCO	Stephen Hendrie (substituted on) 68'
Sub	DF	ENG	Alex Pike (substituted on) 68'
Sub	DF	ENG	George Dobson
Sub	FW	ENG	Jahmal Hector-Ingram (substituted on) 100'

== See also ==
- 2015–16 Professional U21 Development League
- 2015–16 FA Cup
- 2015–16 FA Youth Cup
- 2015–16 in English football
