= Leonardo Lopes =

Portuguese footballer (born 1998)

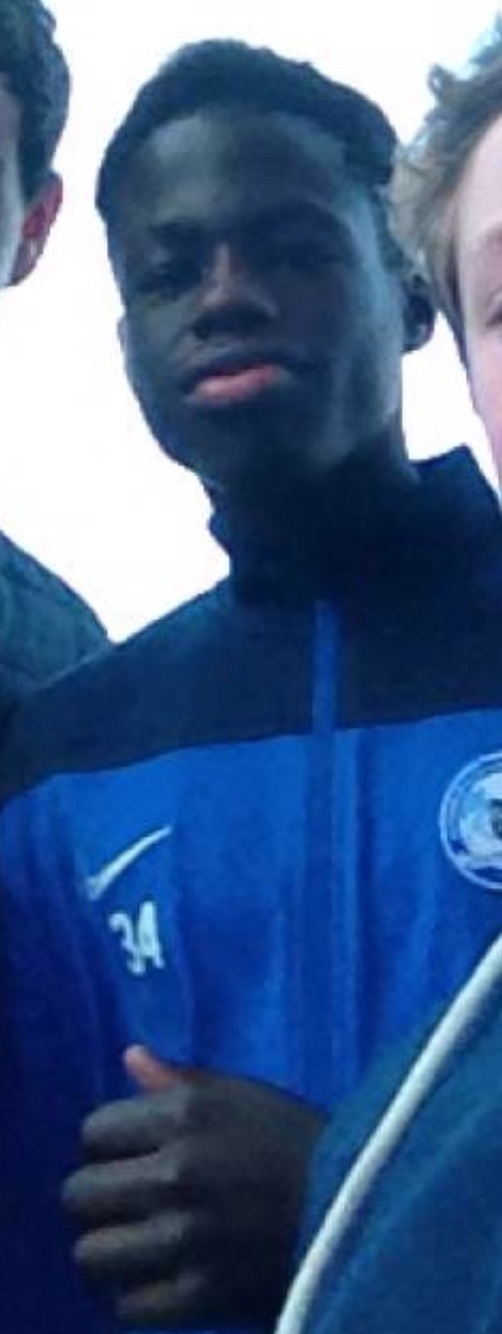
- Lopes with Peterborough United in 2015

Personal information
- Full name: Leonardo Adelino da Silva Lopes
- Date of birth: 30 November 1998 (age 27)
- Place of birth: Lisbon, Portugal
- Height: 1.68 m (5 ft 6 in)
- Position: Midfielder

Team information
- Current team: Gent
- Number: 22

Youth career
- 2008–2010: Santa Iria
- 2010–2011: Povoense
- 2013–2014: Peterborough United

Senior career*
Years	Team	Apps	(Gls)
2014–2018	Peterborough United	87	(2)
2018–2019	Wigan Athletic	1	(0)
2019	→ Gillingham (loan)	14	(1)
2019–2020	Hull City	40	(2)
2020–2024	Cercle Brugge	113	(5)
2024–	Gent	62	(1)

International career
2018	Portugal U20	1	(0)
- * Club domestic league appearances and goals as of 20:30, 25 October 2026 (UTC)

Leonardo Adelino da Silva Lopes (born 30 November 1998) is a Portuguese professional footballer who plays as a midfielder for Belgian Pro League club Gent.

== Career ==
=== Peterborough United ===
Lopes joined the Peterborough United academy in 2013 when he was 14 years old. He previously played at youth level for the Powerleague Colts, when he was 13 in 2012. Lopes signed a senior contract on 10 March 2015 along with four other graduates (Harry Anderson, Jack Friend, Jonny Edwards and Tobi Adebayo-Rowling). He made his senior debut in a 4–3 victory against Crawley Town on 25 April 2015. He scored his first goal for Peterborough in a 3–1 EFL Cup loss against Swansea City on 23 August 2016. He scored his first league goals when he scored twice in a 4–2 win over Bristol Rovers on 22 April 2017.

=== Wigan Athletic ===
It was announced on 5 June 2018 that Lopes had completed a transfer to Wigan Athletic for an undisclosed fee, thought to be around £1.5 million. On 31 January 2019, after making just 3 appearances for Wigan in all competitions, he joined EFL League One side Gillingham on loan for the remainder of the 2018–19 season. At Gillingham he scored once in a 4–2 win over AFC Wimbledon.

=== Hull City ===
On 8 August 2019, Lopes joined fellow Championship club Hull City for an undisclosed fee on a three-year deal. Lopes made his first appearance for Hull City in the First round of the EFL Cup in the 0–3 away win against Tranmere Rovers. He scored his first goal for the club on 14 February 2020 when he opened the scoring in a 4–4 draw against Swansea City.

=== Cercle Brugge ===
On 10 September 2020, Lopes joined Belgian club Cercle Brugge for an undisclosed fee.

=== Gent ===
On 13 December 2024, Lopes signed a three and a half-year contract with Gent.

== International career ==
Lopes has represented Portugal at under-20 level, making his debut in March 2018, in a 1–0 loss to Germany U20 in a Under 20 Elite League match.

== Career statistics ==
As of match played 25 October 2026.

Appearances and goals by club, season and competition
Club	Season	League			FA Cup		League Cup		Europe		Other		Total	
Club	Season	Division	Apps	Goals	Apps	Goals	Apps	Goals	Apps	Goals	Apps	Goals	Apps	Goals
Peterborough United	2014–15	League One	2	0	0	0	0	0	—		0	0	2	0
Peterborough United	2015–16	League One	8	0	0	0	0	0	—		0	0	8	0
Peterborough United	2016–17	League One	38	2	4	1	2	1	—		2 (Note: Appearances in EFL Trophy)	0	46	4
Peterborough United	2017–18	League One	38	0	0	0	1	0	—		1	0	40	0
Peterborough United	Total		86	2	4	1	3	1	—		3	0	96	4
Wigan Athletic	2018–19	Championship	1	0	1	0	1	0	—		0	0	3	0
Gillingham	2018–19	League One	14	1	0	0	0	0	—		0	0	14	1
Hull City	2019–20	Championship	40	2	2	0	2	0	—		0	0	44	2
Cercle Brugge	2020–21	Belgian Pro League	19	1	2	0	0	0	—		—		21	1
Cercle Brugge	2021–22	Belgian Pro League	31	1	2	0	—		—		—		33	1
Cercle Brugge	2022–23	Belgian Pro League	30	1	2	0	—		—		—		32	1
Cercle Brugge	2023–24	Belgian Pro League	33	2	1	0	—		—		—		34	2
Cercle Brugge	Total		113	5	7	0	—		—		—		120	1
Gent	2024–25	Belgian Pro League	17	0	0	0	—		2 (Note: Appearances in UEFA Conference League)	0	—		19	0
Gent	2025–26	Belgian Pro League	36	1	3	0	—		—		—		39	1
Gent	2026–27	Belgian Pro League	9	0	0	0	—		8	0	—		17	0
Gent	Total		62	1	3	0	—		10	0	—		75	1
Career total			306	11	17	1	6	2	10	0	3	0	351	13
