= 2019–20 EFL Cup =

Carabao Cup, League Cup

Tournament details
- Country: England; Wales
- Dates: 6 August 2019 – 1 March 2020
- Teams: Originally 92 (91 after walkover)

Final positions
- Champions: Manchester City (7th title)
- Runners-up: Aston Villa

Tournament statistics
- Matches played: 92
- Goals scored: 227 (2.47 per match)
- Attendance: 960,406 (10,439 per match)
- Top goal scorer: Liam Boyce (5 goals)

The 2019–20 EFL Cup was the 60th season of the EFL Cup. Also known as the Carabao Cup for sponsorship reasons, the competition was open to all clubs participating in the Premier League and the English Football League.

Manchester City were the two-time defending champions, having retained the trophy in 2019, and won their third consecutive title, defeating Aston Villa in the final at Wembley Stadium in London on 1 March 2020.

== Access ==
All 92 clubs in the Premier League and English Football League entered the season's EFL Cup. Access was distributed across the top 4 leagues of the English football league system. For the first two rounds, the draw was regionalised into northern and southern clubs.

In the first round, 22 of 24 Championship clubs and all League One, and League Two clubs entered. Due to their financial crisis, Bury were later withdrawn from the competition and ultimately expelled from the EFL. Sheffield Wednesday, who were Bury's first round opponents, advanced to the second round automatically as a result.

The following round, the two remaining Championship clubs Cardiff City and Fulham (who finished 18th and 19th respectively in the 2018–19 Premier League season), and the Premier League clubs not involved in either the Champions League or Europa League entered.

Arsenal, Chelsea, Liverpool, Manchester City, Manchester United, Tottenham Hotspur, and Wolverhampton Wanderers all received byes to the third round owing to their participation in European competitions.

	Clubs entering in this round	Clubs advancing from previous round	Number of games
First round (70 clubs)	24 clubs from EFL League Two; 24 clubs from EFL League One; 22 clubs from EFL Championship	N/A	35
Second round (50 clubs)	2 clubs from EFL Championship; 13 Premier League clubs (not involved in European competition)	35 winners from first round	25
Third round (32 clubs)	7 Premier League clubs (involved in European competition)	25 winners from second round	16
Fourth round (16 clubs)	No clubs enter the fourth round	16 winners from third round	8
Quarter-finals (8 clubs)	No clubs enter the quarter-finals	8 winners from fourth round	4
Semi-finals (4 clubs)	No clubs enter the semi-finals	4 winners from fifth round	4 (2 legs for each semi-final)
Final (2 clubs)	No clubs enter the final	2 winners from semi-finals	1

== First round ==
A total of 70 clubs played in the first round: 24 from League Two (tier 4), 24 from League One (tier 3), and 22 from the Championship (tier 2). The draw for this round was split on a geographical basis into 'northern' and 'southern' sections. Teams were drawn against a team from the same section. The draw was made by John Barnes and Ray Parlour on 20 June 2019.

=== Northern section ===
13 August 2019	Accrington Stanley (3)	1–3	Sunderland (3)	Accrington
19:45 BST	Bishop 61' (pen.)	Report	McNulty 17'; McGeady 79'; Wyke 90+4'	Stadium: Crown Ground; Attendance: 2,343; Referee: Darren Drysdale

13 August 2019	Barnsley (2)	0–3	Carlisle United (4)	Barnsley
19:45 BST		Report	McKirdy 24'; Bridge 58' (pen.); Thomas 64'	Stadium: Oakwell; Attendance: 5,208; Referee: Ben Toner

13 August 2019	Blackburn Rovers (2)	3–2	Oldham Athletic (4)	Blackburn
19:45 BST	Dack 70'; Downing 90+2'; Rothwell 90+5'	Report	Nepomuceno 14'; Maouche 80'	Stadium: Ewood Park; Attendance: 5,215; Referee: Tom Nield

13 August 2019	Blackpool (3)	2–2 (2–4 p)	Macclesfield Town (4)	Blackpool
19:45 BST	Thompson 31'; Gnanduillet 90' (pen.)	Report	Bushiri 39' (o.g.); Gomis 65'	Stadium: Bloomfield Road; Attendance: 3,715; Referee: Martin Coy
	Penalties
	Pritchard (penalty scored); Kaikai (penalty missed); Delfouneso (penalty scored); Thompson (penalty missed)		(penalty missed) Horsfall; (penalty scored) Archibald; (penalty scored) Osadebe; (penalty scored) Clarke; (penalty scored) Evans

13 August 2019	Bradford City (4)	0–4	Preston North End (2)	Bradford
19:45 BST		Report	Green 13'; Barkhuizen 19', 53'; Harrop 71'	Stadium: Valley Parade; Attendance: 3,456; Referee: Matthew Donohue

13 August 2019	Grimsby Town (4)	1–0	Doncaster Rovers (3)	Cleethorpes
19:45 BST	Cook 40'	Report		Stadium: Blundell Park; Attendance: 2,470; Referee: John Brooks

13 August 2019	Huddersfield Town (2)	0–1	Lincoln City (3)	Huddersfield
19:45 BST		Report	Anderson 55'	Stadium: Kirklees Stadium; Attendance: 6,908; Referee: Peter Wright

13 August 2019	Mansfield Town (4)	2–2 (5–6 p)	Morecambe (4)	Mansfield
19:45 BST	Pearce 57'; Sterling-James 68'	Report	Old 18', 59'	Stadium: Field Mill; Attendance: 1,884; Referee: Robert Lewis
	Penalties
	Khan (penalty missed); Sterling-James (penalty missed); Benning (penalty scored); Rose (penalty scored); Pearce (penalty scored); Tomlinson (penalty scored); Smith (penalty scored); Sweeney (penalty missed)		Miller (penalty missed); Cranston (penalty scored); O'Sullivan (penalty scored); Lavelle (penalty missed); Buxton (penalty scored); Kenyon (penalty scored); Brewitt (penalty scored); Old (penalty scored)

13 August 2019	Middlesbrough (2)	2–2 (2–4 p)	Crewe Alexandra (4)	Middlesbrough
19:45 BST	Fletcher 75'; Bola 90+1'	Report	Porter 42'; Kirk 45+1'	Stadium: Riverside Stadium; Attendance: 7,897; Referee: Michael Salisbury
	Penalties
	Assombalonga (penalty missed); Fletcher (penalty scored); McNair (penalty scored); Browne (penalty missed)		Porter (penalty scored); Green (penalty scored); Pickering (penalty scored); Jones (penalty scored)

13 August 2019	Nottingham Forest (2)	1–0	Fleetwood Town (3)	West Bridgford
19:45 BST	Silva 59'	Report		Stadium: City Ground; Attendance: 7,432; Referee: Alan Young

13 August 2019	Port Vale (4)	1–2	Burton Albion (3)	Burslem
19:45 BST	Cullen 53' (pen.)	Report	Boyce 9'; Fraser 62'	Stadium: Vale Park; Attendance: 2,252; Referee: Paul Marsden

13 August 2019	Rochdale (3)	5–2	Bolton Wanderers (3)	Rochdale
19:45 BST	Henderson 27' (pen.); Pyke 64'; Camps 66', 73'; Rathbone 86'	Report	Darcy 14'; Politic 48'	Stadium: Spotland Stadium; Attendance: 3,362; Referee: Andy Haines

13 August 2019	Salford City (4)	0–3	Leeds United (2)	Salford
19:45 BST		Report	Nketiah 43'; Berardi 50'; Klich 58'	Stadium: Moor Lane; Attendance: 4,518; Referee: Keith Stroud

13 August 2019	Scunthorpe United (4)	0–1	Derby County (2)	Scunthorpe
19:45 BST		Report	Buchanan 78'	Stadium: Glanford Park; Attendance: 3,679; Referee: Robert Jones

13 August 2019	Shrewsbury Town (3)	0–4	Rotherham United (3)	Shrewsbury
19:45 BST		Report	Crooks 2'; Vassell 3'; Ladapo 45'; Wood 84'	Stadium: New Meadow; Attendance: 2,813; Referee: Anthony Backhouse

13 August 2019	Tranmere Rovers (3)	0–3	Hull City (2)	Birkenhead
19:45 BST		Report	Toral 1'; Milinković 6'; Tafazolli 45'	Stadium: Prenton Park; Attendance: 3,421; Referee: Sebastian Stockbridge

13 August 2019	Wigan Athletic (2)	0–1	Stoke City (2)	Wigan
19:45 BST		Report	Vokes 10'	Stadium: DW Stadium; Attendance: 3,821; Referee: Dean Whitestone

13 August 2019	Sheffield Wednesday (2)	w/o (Note: The match was awarded to Sheffield Wednesday on 20 August 2019, following Bury's failure to provide clarity or evidence to the EFL regarding their ability to fulfill their financial obligations.)	Bury (3)	Sheffield
				Stadium: Hillsborough Stadium

=== Southern section ===
6 August 2019	Portsmouth (3)	3–0	Birmingham City (2)	Portsmouth
19:45 BST	Harrison 30', 54'; Close 39'	Report		Stadium: Fratton Park; Attendance: 9,913; Referee: Neil Hair

13 August 2019	AFC Wimbledon (3)	2–2 (2–4 p)	Milton Keynes Dons (3)	Kingston upon Thames
19:45 BST	Wagstaff 8'; O'Neill 90+4'	Report	McGrandles 16'; Kasumu 50'	Stadium: Kingsmeadow; Attendance: 2,191; Referee: Craig Hicks
	Penalties
	O'Neill (penalty scored); Reilly (penalty missed); Hartigan (penalty scored); Pigott (penalty missed)		(penalty scored) Poole; (penalty scored) Martin; (penalty missed) Cargill; (penalty scored) McGrandles; (penalty scored) Gilbey

13 August 2019	Brentford (2)	1–1 (4–5 p)	Cambridge United (4)	Brentford
19:45 BST	Forss 69'	Report	Richards 3'	Stadium: Griffin Park; Attendance: 5,215; Referee: Lee Swabey
	Penalties
	Jensen (penalty scored); Marcondes (penalty missed); Mbeumo (penalty scored); Watkins (penalty scored); Forss (penalty scored); Racic (penalty missed)		(penalty scored) Hannant; (penalty missed) Lewis; (penalty scored) Dunk; (penalty scored) Lambe; (penalty scored) Darling; (penalty scored) Knibbs

13 August 2019	Bristol Rovers (3)	3–0	Cheltenham Town (4)	Horfield
19:45 BST	Smith 38', 49'; Clarke-Harris 67'	Report		Stadium: Memorial Stadium; Attendance: 2,909; Referee: Graham Salisbury

13 August 2019	Charlton Athletic (2)	0–0 (3–5 p)	Forest Green Rovers (4)	Charlton, London
19:45 BST		Report		Stadium: The Valley; Attendance: 2,693; Referee: John Busby
	Penalties
	Bonne (penalty scored); Sarr (penalty scored); Morgan (penalty missed); Oshilaja (penalty scored)		(penalty scored) J. Mills; (penalty scored) Grubb; (penalty scored) Adams; (penalty scored) Morton; (penalty scored) McCoulsky

13 August 2019	Colchester United (4)	3–0	Swindon Town (4)	Colchester
19:45 BST	Eastman 77'; Senior 90+2'; Comley 90+7'	Report		Stadium: Colchester Community Stadium; Attendance: 1,595; Referee: Charles Breakspear

13 August 2019	Coventry City (3)	4–1	Exeter City (4)	Birmingham
19:45 BST	Hiwula 2', 28'; Godden 23'; Bakayoko 88'	Report	Sweeney 81'	Stadium: St Andrew's; Attendance: 1,555; Referee: Scott Oldham

13 August 2019	Gillingham (3)	2–2 (1–4 p)	Newport County (4)	Gillingham, Kent
19:45 BST	Hanlan 26' (pen.); Ndjoli 90' (pen.)	Report	Abrahams 26'; Amond 90+4' (pen.)	Stadium: Priestfield Stadium; Attendance: 1,996; Referee: Trevor Kettle
	Penalties
	Jones (penalty missed); Mandron (penalty scored); Marshall (penalty missed)		Sheehan (penalty scored); Amond (penalty scored); Demetriou (penalty scored); Abrahams (penalty scored)

13 August 2019	Luton Town (2)	3–1	Ipswich Town (3)	Luton
19:45 BST	Jones 8'; Lee 17' (pen.); Shinnie 55'	Report	Dobra 74'	Stadium: Kenilworth Road; Attendance: 5,435; Referee: Brett Huxtable

13 August 2019	Oxford United (3)	1–0	Peterborough United (3)	Oxford
19:45 BST	Brannagan 88'	Report		Stadium: Kassam Stadium; Attendance: 2,798; Referee: Oliver Yates

13 August 2019	Plymouth Argyle (4)	2–0	Leyton Orient (4)	Plymouth
19:45 BST	McFadzean 59'; Telford 62'	Report		Stadium: Home Park; Attendance: 5,573; Referee: Antony Coggins

13 August 2019	Queens Park Rangers (2)	3–3 (5–4 p)	Bristol City (2)	Shepherd's Bush
19:45 BST	Wells 15'; Chair 26'; Manning 86' (pen.)	Report	Diédhiou 13'; Hunt 41'; Walsh 59'	Stadium: Loftus Road; Attendance: 5,795; Referee: Andy Davies
	Penalties
	Manning (penalty scored); Mlakar (penalty scored); Wells (penalty scored); Smith (penalty missed); Barbet (penalty missed); Chair (penalty scored); Amos (penalty scored)		(penalty missed) Diédhiou; (penalty scored) Walsh; (penalty scored) O'Dowda; (penalty missed) Eliasson; (penalty scored) Moore; (penalty scored) Rowe; (penalty missed) Wright

13 August 2019	Stevenage (4)	1–2	Southend United (3)	Stevenage
19:45 BST	Parrett 14'	Report	Kelman 47', 55'	Stadium: Broadhall Way; Attendance: 1,315; Referee: Christopher Sarginson

13 August 2019	Swansea City (2)	3–1	Northampton Town (4)	Swansea
19:45 BST	Ayew 80', 88'; Byers 83'	Report	Warburton 61'	Stadium: Liberty Stadium; Attendance: 8,058; Referee: Kevin Johnson

13 August 2019	Walsall (4)	2–3	Crawley Town (4)	Walsall
19:45 BST	Lavery 54' (pen.), 71'	Report	Morais 21'; Dallison 48'; Nadesan 56'	Stadium: Bescot Stadium; Attendance: 2,451; Referee: Carl Boyeson

13 August 2019	West Bromwich Albion (2)	1–2	Millwall (2)	West Bromwich
19:45 BST	Austin 9'	Report	Bradshaw 28'; O'Brien 55'	Stadium: The Hawthorns; Attendance: 10,704; Referee: Ross Joyce

13 August 2019	Wycombe Wanderers (3)	1–1 (2–4 p)	Reading (2)	High Wycombe
19:45 BST	Samuel 59'	Report	Pușcaș 63'	Stadium: Adams Park; Attendance: 4,802; Referee: Darren England
	Penalties
	Gape (penalty scored); Freeman (penalty missed); Pattison (penalty scored); Onyedinma (penalty missed)		(penalty scored) Pușcaș; (penalty scored) Baldock; (penalty scored) Swift; (penalty scored) Loader

== Second round ==
A total of 50 teams played in the second round, including Fulham and Cardiff City from the Championship, as well as the Premier League clubs that are not involved in European competition. The draw for this round was split on a geographical basis into 'northern' and 'southern' sections. Teams were drawn against a team from the same section. The draw was made on 13 August 2019 by Gary Neville and Paul Robinson.

=== Northern section ===
27 August 2019	Burton Albion (3)	4–0	Morecambe (4)	Burton upon Trent
19:45 BST	Boyce 34', 45+2', 74'; Edwards 51'	Report		Stadium: Pirelli Stadium; Attendance: 1,500; Referee: Seb Stockbridge

27 August 2019	Crewe Alexandra (4)	1–6	Aston Villa (1)	Crewe
19:45 BST	Wintle 84'	Report	Konsa 2'; Hourihane 24', 45+3'; Davis 69'; Guilbert 76'; Grealish 87'	Stadium: Gresty Road; Attendance: 7,173; Referee: Jarred Gillett

27 August 2019	Leeds United (2)	2–2 (4–5 p)	Stoke City (2)	Leeds
19:45 BST	Nketiah 67'; Costa 81'	Report	Batth 39'; Vokes 44'	Stadium: Elland Road; Attendance: 30,002; Referee: Oliver Langford
	Penalties
	Douglas (penalty scored); Costa (penalty scored); Phillips (penalty scored); Nketiah (penalty scored); Harrison (penalty missed)		(penalty scored) Vokes; (penalty scored) Duffy; (penalty scored) Etebo; (penalty scored) Clucas; (penalty scored) Butland

27 August 2019	Nottingham Forest (2)	3–0	Derby County (2)	Nottingham
19:45 BST	Adomah 25'; Lolley 35'; Carvalho 79'	Report		Stadium: City Ground; Attendance: 26,971; Referee: John Brooks

27 August 2019	Preston North End (2)	2–2	Hull City (2)	Preston
19:45 BST	Huntington 20'; Harrop 26'	Report	Magennis 34' (pen.); Bowen 90+5'	Stadium: Deepdale; Attendance: 6,093; Referee: David Webb
	Penalties
	Harrop (penalty scored); Ledson (penalty scored); Stockley (penalty scored); Bodin (penalty scored); Browne (penalty scored)		(penalty scored) Magennis; (penalty missed) Eaves; (penalty scored) Toral; (penalty scored) Lopes; (penalty scored) Stewart

27 August 2019	Rochdale (3)	2–1	Carlisle United (4)	Rochdale
19:45 BST	Morley 11'; Done 31'	Report	Bridge 71' (pen.)	Stadium: Spotland Stadium; Attendance: 1,974; Referee: Peter Wright

27 August 2019	Sheffield United (1)	2–1	Blackburn Rovers (2)	Sheffield
19:45 BST	Stearman 31'; Norwood 45+3'	Report	Gallagher 72'	Stadium: Bramall Lane; Attendance: 9,714; Referee: Geoff Eltringham

28 August 2019	Burnley (1)	1–3	Sunderland (3)	Burnley
19:45 BST	Rodriguez 12'	Report	Grigg 35'; Flanagan 47'; Dobson 50'	Stadium: Turf Moor; Attendance: 7,445; Referee: Darren England

28 August 2019	Lincoln City (3)	2–4	Everton (1)	Lincoln
19:45 BST	Anderson 1'; Andrade 70'	Report	Digne 36'; Sigurðsson 59' (pen.); Iwobi 81'; Richarlison 88'	Stadium: Sincil Bank; Attendance: 9,971; Referee: Darren Bond

28 August 2019	Newcastle United (1)	1–1 (2–4 p)	Leicester City (1)	Newcastle upon Tyne
19:45 BST	Muto 53'	Report	Maddison 34'	Stadium: St James' Park; Attendance: 22,727; Referee: Tim Robinson
	Penalties
	Muto (penalty scored); Shelvey (penalty missed); Schär (penalty scored); Hayden (penalty missed)		Fuchs (penalty scored); Maddison (penalty scored); Tielemans (penalty scored); Barnes (penalty missed); Vardy (penalty scored)

28 August 2019	Rotherham United (3)	0–1	Sheffield Wednesday (2)	Rotherham
19:45 BST		Report	Nuhiu 90+6'	Stadium: New York Stadium; Attendance: 8,679; Referee: Charles Breakspear

10 September 2019	Grimsby Town (4)	0–0 (Note: Original match on 27 August 2019 was abandoned at half-time due to inclement weather, with the score 0–0.) (5–4 p)	Macclesfield Town (4)	Grimsby
19:45 BST		Report		Stadium: Blundell Park; Attendance: 3,011; Referee: Darren Drysdale
	Penalties
	Green (penalty missed); Hanson (penalty scored); Cardwell (penalty scored); Ogbu (penalty scored); Hessenthaler (penalty scored); Whitehouse (penalty scored)		Ironside (penalty scored); Horsfall (penalty missed); Archibald (penalty scored); Arthur Gnahoua (penalty scored); Evans (penalty scored); Kirby (penalty missed)

=== Southern section ===
27 August 2019	Bristol Rovers (3)	1–2	Brighton & Hove Albion (1)	Bristol
19:45 BST	Nichols 64'	Report	Connolly 55'; Murray 90+2'	Stadium: Memorial Stadium; Attendance: 5,864; Referee: Matt Donohue

27 August 2019	Cardiff City (2)	0–3	Luton Town (2)	Cardiff
19:45 BST		Report	Hoilett 43' (o.g.); Sheehan 63'; Jervis 73'	Stadium: Cardiff City Stadium; Attendance: 4,111; Referee: Tony Harrington

27 August 2019	Crawley Town (4)	1–0	Norwich City (1)	Crawley
19:45 BST	Lubala 17'	Report		Stadium: Broadfield Stadium; Attendance: 5,109; Referee: John Busby

27 August 2019	Crystal Palace (1)	0–0 (4–5 p)	Colchester United (4)	Selhurst, London
19:45 BST		Report		Stadium: Selhurst Park; Attendance: 8,898; Referee: Andy Woolmer
	Penalties
	Townsend (penalty missed); Ayew (penalty scored); Benteke (penalty scored); Camarasa (penalty scored); Zaha (penalty scored)		(penalty scored) Norris; (penalty scored) Nouble; (penalty scored) Brown; (penalty scored) Cowan-Hall; (penalty scored) Chilvers

27 August 2019	Fulham (2)	0–1	Southampton (1)	Fulham, London
19:45 BST		Report	Obafemi 57'	Stadium: Craven Cottage; Attendance: 8,467; Referee: Robert Jones

27 August 2019	Newport County (4)	0–2	West Ham United (1)	Newport
19:45 BST		Report	Wilshere 43'; Fornals 65'	Stadium: Rodney Parade; Attendance: 6,382; Referee: Steve Martin

27 August 2019	Oxford United (3)	2–2 (4–2 p)	Millwall (2)	Oxford
19:45 BST	Sykes 87'; Henry 90+4' (pen.)	Report	Böðvarsson 29', 52'	Stadium: Kassam Stadium; Attendance: 3,693; Referee: Craig Hicks
	Penalties
	Thorne (penalty scored); Woodburn (penalty scored); Henry (penalty scored); Mousinho (penalty scored)		(penalty scored) McCarthy; (penalty missed) Böðvarsson; (penalty missed) Ferguson; (penalty scored) Williams

27 August 2019	Plymouth Argyle (4)	2–4	Reading (2)	Plymouth
19:45 BST	Taylor 22'; Baxter 55'	Report	Barrett 35', 72'; Méïté 87' (pen.), 90+1'	Stadium: Home Park; Attendance: 8,365; Referee: Kevin Johnson

27 August 2019	Southend United (3)	1–4	Milton Keynes Dons (3)	Southend
19:45 BST	Goodship 54'	Report	Healey 35'; Brittain 41'; Boateng 82'; Nombe 90+2'	Stadium: Roots Hall; Attendance: 2,433; Referee: Neil Hair

27 August 2019	Watford (1)	3–0	Coventry City (3)	Watford
19:45 BST	Janmaat 37'; Sarr 56'; Peñaranda 69'	Report		Stadium: Vicarage Road; Attendance: 12,257; Referee: Gavin Ward

28 August 2019	Bournemouth (1)	0–0 (3–0 p)	Forest Green Rovers (4)	Bournemouth
19:45 BST		Report		Stadium: Dean Court; Attendance: 9,657; Referee: Dean Whitestone
	Penalties
	King (penalty scored); Solanke (penalty scored); Ibe (penalty missed); Billing (penalty scored)		J. Mills (penalty missed); Dawson (penalty missed); Morton (penalty missed)

28 August 2019	Queens Park Rangers (2)	0–2	Portsmouth (3)	Shepherd's Bush, London
19:45 BST		Report	Marquis 77' (pen.); Harness 81'	Stadium: Loftus Road; Attendance: 7,783; Referee: Ross Joyce

28 August 2019	Swansea City (2)	6–0	Cambridge United (4)	Swansea
19:45 BST	Peterson 1'; Byers 20'; Surridge 24', 45+1'; Garrick 31'; Routledge 76'	Report		Stadium: Liberty Stadium; Attendance: 8,763; Referee: Michael Salisbury

== Third round ==
A total of 32 teams played in this round. Arsenal, Chelsea, Liverpool, Manchester City, Manchester United, Tottenham Hotspur, and Wolverhampton Wanderers entered in this round due to their European qualification. The draw was conducted on 28 August 2019 by Andy Hinchcliffe and Don Goodman. The ties were played on the week commencing 23 September 2019.

24 September 2019	Arsenal (1)	5–0	Nottingham Forest (2)	Holloway, London
19:45 BST	Martinelli 31', 90+2'; Holding 71'; Willock 77'; Nelson 84'	Report		Stadium: Emirates Stadium; Attendance: 53,160; Referee: Darren England

24 September 2019	Colchester United (4)	0–0 (4–3 p)	Tottenham Hotspur (1)	Colchester
19:45 BST		Report		Stadium: Colchester Community Stadium; Attendance: 9,481; Referee: Jarred Gillett
	Penalties
	Norris (penalty scored); Nouble (penalty scored); Brown (penalty missed); Cowan-Hall (penalty scored); Lapslie (penalty scored)		(penalty missed) Eriksen; (penalty scored) Alli; (penalty scored) Lamela; (penalty scored) Son Heung-min; (penalty missed) Lucas

24 September 2019	Crawley Town (4)	1–1 (5–3 p)	Stoke City (2)	Crawley
19:45 BST	Ferguson 38'	Report	Vokes 23'	Stadium: Broadfield Stadium; Attendance: 4,165; Referee: Kevin Johnson
	Penalties
	Lubala (penalty scored); Sesay (penalty scored); Dallison (penalty scored); Nathaniel-George (penalty scored); Palmer (penalty scored)		(penalty missed) Vokes; (penalty scored) Smith; (penalty scored) Duffy; (penalty scored) Etebo

24 September 2019	Luton Town (2)	0–4	Leicester City (1)	Luton
19:45 BST		Report	Gray 34'; Justin 44'; Tielemans 79'; Iheanacho 86'	Stadium: Kenilworth Road; Attendance: 8,260; Referee: Matt Donohue

24 September 2019	Portsmouth (3)	0–4	Southampton (1)	Portsmouth
19:45 BST		Report	Ings 21', 44'; Cédric 77'; Redmond 86'	Stadium: Fratton Park; Attendance: 18,707; Referee: Kevin Friend

24 September 2019	Preston North End (2)	0–3	Manchester City (1)	Preston
19:45 BST		Report	Sterling 19'; Gabriel Jesus 35'; Ledson 42' (o.g.)	Stadium: Deepdale; Attendance: 22,025; Referee: Lee Mason

24 September 2019	Sheffield Wednesday (2)	0–2	Everton (1)	Sheffield
19:45 BST		Report	Calvert-Lewin 6', 10'	Stadium: Hillsborough Stadium; Attendance: 21,485; Referee: Jeremy Simpson

24 September 2019	Watford (1)	2–1	Swansea City (2)	Watford
19:45 BST	Welbeck 28'; Pereyra 79'	Report	Surridge 34'	Stadium: Vicarage Road; Attendance: 8,903; Referee: Darren Bond

25 September 2019	Brighton & Hove Albion (1)	1–3	Aston Villa (1)	Brighton
19:45 BST	Roberts 61'	Report	Jota 22'; Hourihane 33'; Grealish 78'	Stadium: Falmer Stadium; Attendance: 14,982; Referee: Graham Scott

25 September 2019	Burton Albion (3)	2–0	Bournemouth (1)	Burton upon Trent
19:45 BST	Sarkic 14'; Broadhead 72'	Report		Stadium: Pirelli Stadium; Attendance: 2,505; Referee: John Busby

25 September 2019	Chelsea (1)	7–1	Grimsby Town (4)	Fulham, London
19:45 BST	Barkley 4'; Batshuayi 7', 86'; Pedro 43' (pen.); Zouma 56'; James 82'; Hudson-Odoi 89'	Report	Green 19'	Stadium: Stamford Bridge; Attendance: 39,674; Referee: Keith Stroud

25 September 2019	Milton Keynes Dons (3)	0–2	Liverpool (1)	Milton Keynes
19:45 BST		Report	Milner 41'; Hoever 69'	Stadium: Stadium MK; Attendance: 28,521; Referee: Oliver Langford

25 September 2019	Oxford United (3)	4–0	West Ham United (1)	Oxford
19:45 BST	Moore 55'; Taylor 71'; Fosu 84'; Baptiste 90+2'	Report		Stadium: Kassam Stadium; Attendance: 10,450; Referee: Robert Jones

25 September 2019	Sheffield United (1)	0–1	Sunderland (3)	Sheffield
19:45 BST		Report	Power 9'	Stadium: Bramall Lane; Attendance: 11,675; Referee: Tim Robinson

25 September 2019	Wolverhampton Wanderers (1)	1–1 (4–2 p)	Reading (2)	Wolverhampton
19:45 BST	Jordão 27'	Report	Boyé 90+9'	Stadium: Molineux Stadium; Attendance: 20,702; Referee: Peter Bankes
	Penalties
	Neves (penalty scored); Vallejo (penalty scored); Bennett (penalty scored); Vinagre (penalty scored)		(penalty scored) Miazga; (penalty scored) Pușcaș; (penalty missed) Swift; (penalty missed) Boyé

25 September 2019	Manchester United (1)	1–1 (5–3 p)	Rochdale (3)	Manchester
20:00 BST	Greenwood 68'	Report	Matheson 76'	Stadium: Old Trafford; Attendance: 58,314; Referee: John Brooks
	Penalties
	Mata (penalty scored); Pereira (penalty scored); Fred (penalty scored); Greenwood (penalty scored); James (penalty scored)		(penalty scored) Andrew; (penalty missed) Keohane; (penalty scored) Morley; (penalty scored) Wilbraham

== Fourth round ==
A total of 16 teams played in this round (none of which were Championship sides). The draw was conducted at Stadium MK by Andy Hinchcliffe and Don Goodman following the third round match between MK Dons and Liverpool on 25 September 2019. Ties were played in the week commencing 28 October 2019.

29 October 2019	Burton Albion (3)	1–3	Leicester City (1)	Burton upon Trent
19:45 GMT	Boyce 52'	Report	Iheanacho 7'; Tielemans 20'; Maddison 89'	Stadium: Pirelli Stadium; Attendance: 6,186; Referee: Darren England

29 October 2019	Crawley Town (4)	1–3	Colchester United (4)	Crawley
19:45 GMT	Bulman 20'	Report	Norris 22'; Luyambula 53' (o.g.); Gambin 79'	Stadium: Broadfield Stadium; Attendance: 5,612; Referee: Tony Harrington

29 October 2019	Everton (1)	2–0	Watford (1)	Liverpool
19:45 GMT	Holgate 72'; Richarlison 90+3'	Report		Stadium: Goodison Park; Attendance: 34,979; Referee: Simon Hooper

29 October 2019	Manchester City (1)	3–1	Southampton (1)	Manchester
19:45 GMT	Otamendi 20'; Agüero 38', 56'	Report	Stephens 75'	Stadium: City of Manchester Stadium; Attendance: 37,143; Referee: Jonathan Moss

29 October 2019	Oxford United (3)	1–1 (4–2 p)	Sunderland (3)	Oxford
19:45 GMT	Hall 25'	Report	McNulty 78'	Stadium: Kassam Stadium; Attendance: 11,108; Referee: Steve Martin
	Penalties
	Henry (penalty scored); Forde (penalty scored); Fosu (penalty scored); Mousinho (penalty scored)		(penalty scored) Power; (penalty scored) O'Nien; (penalty missed) Grigg; (penalty missed) McNulty

30 October 2019	Liverpool (1)	5–5 (5–4 p)	Arsenal (1)	Liverpool
19:30 GMT	Mustafi 6' (o.g.); Milner 43' (pen.); Oxlade-Chamberlain 58'; Origi 62', 90+4'	Report	Torreira 19'; Martinelli 26', 36'; Maitland-Niles 54'; Willock 70'	Stadium: Anfield; Attendance: 52,694; Referee: Andre Marriner
	Penalties
	Milner (penalty scored); Lallana (penalty scored); Brewster (penalty scored); Origi (penalty scored); Jones (penalty scored)		(penalty scored) Bellerín; (penalty scored) Guendouzi; (penalty scored) Martinelli; (penalty missed) Ceballos; (penalty scored) Maitland-Niles

30 October 2019	Aston Villa (1)	2–1	Wolverhampton Wanderers (1)	Birmingham
19:45 GMT	El Ghazi 28'; Elmohamady 57'	Report	Cutrone 54'	Stadium: Villa Park; Attendance: 34,962; Referee: Lee Mason

30 October 2019	Chelsea (1)	1–2	Manchester United (1)	Fulham, London
20:05 GMT	Batshuayi 61'	Report	Rashford 25' (pen.), 73'	Stadium: Stamford Bridge; Attendance: 38,645; Referee: Paul Tierney

== Quarter-finals ==
A total of eight teams played in this round. The draw was made on 31 October 2019, by David James and Zoe Ball on BBC Radio 2's Breakfast Show. Ties were played in the week commencing 16 December 2019. Liverpool fielded an inexperienced side for their fixture against Aston Villa and were managed by the under-23s boss, Neil Critchley, while the first team participated in the 2019 FIFA Club World Cup in Qatar under Jürgen Klopp.

17 December 2019	Aston Villa (1)	5–0	Liverpool (1)	Birmingham
19:45 GMT	Hourihane 14'; Boyes 17' (o.g.); Kodjia 37', 45'; Wesley 90+2'	Report		Stadium: Villa Park; Attendance: 30,323; Referee: Lee Mason

18 December 2019	Everton (1)	2–2 (2–4 p)	Leicester City (1)	Liverpool
19:45 GMT	Davies 70'; Baines 90+1'	Report	Maddison 26'; Evans 29'	Stadium: Goodison Park; Attendance: 39,027; Referee: Jonathan Moss
	Penalties
	Tosun (penalty missed); Baines (penalty missed); Holgate (penalty scored); Calvert-Lewin (penalty scored)		(penalty missed) Maddison; (penalty scored) Chilwell; (penalty scored) Pereira; (penalty scored) Gray; (penalty scored) Vardy

18 December 2019	Oxford United (3)	1–3	Manchester City (1)	Oxford
19:45 GMT	Taylor 46'	Report	Cancelo 22'; Sterling 50', 70'	Stadium: Kassam Stadium; Attendance: 11,817; Referee: Andrew Madley

18 December 2019	Manchester United (1)	3–0	Colchester United (4)	Manchester
20:00 GMT	Rashford 51'; Jackson 56' (o.g.); Martial 61'	Report		Stadium: Old Trafford; Attendance: 57,559; Referee: David Coote

== Semi-finals ==
A total of four teams played in this round. The draw was made on 18 December 2019, by Dennis Wise and Chris Kamara at Oxford United's Kassam Stadium. First leg ties were played in the week commencing 6 January 2020, while the second legs were played in the week commencing 27 January 2020.

7 January 2020
20:00 GMT

Manchester United (1)	1–3	Manchester City (1)
Rashford 70'	Report	B. Silva 17'; Mahrez 33'; Pereira 38' (o.g.)

Old Trafford, Greater Manchester
Attendance: 69,023
Referee: Mike Dean
29 January 2020
19:45 GMT

Manchester City (1)	0–1	Manchester United (1)
	Report	Matić 35'

City of Manchester Stadium, Manchester
Attendance: 51,000
Referee: Kevin Friend

Manchester City won 3–2 on aggregate.

8 January 2020
20:00 GMT

Leicester City (1)	1–1	Aston Villa (1)
Iheanacho 74'	Report	Guilbert 28'

King Power Stadium, Leicester
Attendance: 31,280
Referee: Chris Kavanagh
28 January 2020
19:45 GMT

Aston Villa (1)	2–1	Leicester City (1)
Targett 12'; Trézéguet 90+3'	Report	Iheanacho 72'

Villa Park, Birmingham
Attendance: 39,300
Referee: Mike Dean

Aston Villa won 3–2 on aggregate.

== Final ==
The final was played at Wembley Stadium on 1 March 2020.

1 March 2020
16:30 GMT

Aston Villa	1–2	Manchester City
Samatta 41'	Report	Agüero 20'; Rodri 30'

Wembley Stadium, London
Attendance: 82,145
Referee: Lee Mason (Lancashire)

== Top goalscorers ==
Rank	Player	Club	Goals
1	(Northern Ireland) Liam Boyce	Burton Albion	5
2	(Republic of Ireland) Conor Hourihane	Aston Villa	4
2	(Nigeria) Kelechi Iheanacho	Leicester City	4
2	(Brazil) Gabriel Martinelli	Arsenal	4
2	(England) Marcus Rashford	Manchester United	4
6	(Argentina) Sergio Agüero	Manchester City	3
6	(Belgium) Michy Batshuayi	Chelsea	3
6	(England) James Maddison	Leicester City	3
6	(England) Raheem Sterling	Manchester City	3
6	(England) Sam Surridge	Swansea City	3
