= Mallik Wilks =

English footballer (born 1998)

Personal information
- Full name: Mallik Rashaun Coley Wilks
- Date of birth: 15 December 1998 (age 27)
- Place of birth: Leeds, England
- Height: 6 ft 0 in (1.83 m)
- Positions: Winger; striker

Team information
- Current team: Mardin 1969
- Number: 47

Youth career
- –2016: Leeds United

Senior career*
Years	Team	Apps	(Gls)
2016–2019	Leeds United	0	(0)
2017–2018	→ Accrington Stanley (loan)	18	(3)
2018	→ Grimsby Town (loan)	6	(0)
2018–2019	→ Doncaster Rovers (loan)	46	(14)
2019–2020	Barnsley	15	(1)
2020	→ Hull City (loan)	12	(4)
2020–2022	Hull City	71	(23)
2022–2025	Sheffield Wednesday	31	(1)
2024–2025	→ Rotherham United (loan)	41	(9)
2025–2026	Pendikspor	37	(10)
2026–	Mardin 1969	0	(0)
- * Club domestic league appearances and goals as of 10:02, 24 August 2026 (UTC)

Mallik Rashaun Coley Wilks (born 15 December 1998) is an English professional footballer who plays as a winger or striker for Mardin 1969.

Wilks began his professional career with Leeds United, but failed to make a league appearance in his three years at the club. His brother was murdered three days before Wilks made his debut in the FA Cup. He had short loan spells with Accrington Stanley and Grimsby Town, before he spent the 2018–19 season on loan at Doncaster Rovers. He signed a permanent deal with Barnsley in July 2019, though ended the 2019–20 campaign with Hull City following a loan spell. Hull won the League One title in the 2020–21 season and Wilks was named on the PFA Team of the Year. He was sold to Sheffield Wednesday for an undisclosed fee in August 2022.

== Career ==
=== Leeds United ===
Born in Leeds, England, Wilks grew up in Chapeltown and started his career at Leeds United, where he graduated through the academy. After an impressive display at Leeds United's U18 side, he signed scholarship in 2015.

Under head Coach Garry Monk, with Wilks in impressive form for Leeds' Under 23 and youth sides, Wilks was called up to the first team squad, and was named as an unused substitute on 13 December 2016 against Reading in EFL Championship. Wilks was given squad number 36 for the season. On 30 December 2016, days after his 18th birthday, Wilks signed his first professional contract at the club. Wilks was named on the bench and made his debut as a substitute for Leeds against Sutton United on 29 January 2017 in the FA Cup.

On 24 August 2017, Wilks signed a new four-year contract with Leeds United. Whilst out on loan to Doncaster Rovers, on 1 January 2019, Wilks signed a new 2-year contract extension at Leeds, and extended his loan at Doncaster.

==== Accrington Stanley loan ====
The same day he joined League Two side Accrington Stanley on loan, initially until 3 January 2018.

Wilks made his Accrington Stanley debut on 25 August, against Notts County and scored a 95th-minute equaliser on his debut in a 2–2 draw. He scored again a month later on 16 September 2017, in a 2–1 win over Chesterfield, followed up by scoring against Middlesbrough U21s. Wilks later scored two more goals against Newport County and Lincoln City. After scoring 5 goals in all competitions for Accrington in 23 games, in which he spent time on the substitute bench, Wilks returned to Leeds on 3 January upon the expiry of his loan spell. Despite leaving the club in January, he received a winners medal at the end of the 2017–18 season after Accrington went on to win the League Two title.

==== Grimsby Town loan ====
On 26 January 2018, Wilks joined League Two side Grimsby Town on loan until the end of the season. On 27 January 2018, Wilks made his debut for Grimsby in a 1–0 defeat against Luton Town. He went on to play in four games for the club before limping out of a 3–0 defeat against Crawley Town on 10 February. On 6 March 2018 he returned to Leeds United due to injury for treatment. He returned to Grimsby after treatment, and returned from injury on 24 March when he started in a 4–0 defeat against Coventry City.

==== Doncaster Rovers loan ====
On 11 July 2018, Wilks joined EFL League One side Doncaster Rovers on a 6-month loan until 2 January 2019. He started and scored on his debut for the club on 4 August, scoring in the 2–3 win against Southend United. Wilks scored in each of his first 3 games at the club and was also awarded 3 consecutive man of the match awards in these games. He scored his 4th goal of the season on 15 September in the 1–4 win against Walsall, also receiving his 4th man of the match award of the season.

The accolades continued when on 17 September, Wilks was named in the EFL Team Of The Week, and also as the Sky Bet League One 'player of the weekend'. He scored his 6th and 7th goals of the season when he scored a brace in a 0–4 win against Bristol Rovers on 8 December.

On 1 January 2019, Wilks signed a new 2-year contract extension at Leeds, before extending his loan deal at Doncaster for the remainder of the 2018–19 season.

On 6 January 2019, Wilks scored his 9th goal of the season in Doncaster's 3–1 shock win against EFL Championship side Preston North End. Wilks bagged his 12th of the season, and 10th goal in the league in an impressive performance for Doncaster on 23 February in the local derby game against Scunthorpe. On 5 May 2019 at the club's annual award ceremony, Wilks received the Doncaster Rovers Social Media Player of The Year Award, after accumulating the most man of the match performances during the course of the season.

Wilks helped Doncaster reach the League One playoffs where they were knocked out over two legs by Charlton Athletic in May 2019, with Wilks making a huge impression over the course of the season, he scored 16 goals in all competitions and gained 12 assists.

=== Barnsley ===
On 5 July 2019, Wilks joined EFL Championship club Barnsley for an undisclosed fee.

Wilks scored his first goal for the Tykes in a 3–1 defeat to Luton.

=== Hull City ===
Wilks signed on a six-month loan for fellow Championship side Hull City on 17 January 2020. He made his debut on 18 January 2020, when he came off the bench as a 71st-minute substitute for Josh Magennis in the 1–0 defeat away to Derby County. Wilks scored his first goal for Hull in a 1–1 draw away to Reading on 8 February 2020.

On 2 July 2020, Hull announced Wilks' loan deal had ended, but shortly after that they confirmed the signing of Wilks on a permanent deal.

On 18 May 2022, Hull City exercised an option for an additional year on his contract.

=== Sheffield Wednesday ===
On 22 August 2022, Wilks joined Sheffield Wednesday for an undisclosed fee. He made his debut at home to Forest Green Rovers on 27 August 2022, coming off the bench in a 5–0 win. He scored his first goal for the Owls against Burton Albion on 20 September 2022. He was released from his contract following the end of the 2024–25 season.

==== Rotherham United loan ====
On 15 August 2024, Wilks joined Rotherham United on a season-long loan.

=== Pendikspor ===
On 9 July 2025, Wilks joined TFF 1. Lig side Pendikspor on a two-year deal. On 24 August 2026, the club announced they had terminated Wilks' contract. Two days later, he joined league rivals Mardin 1969 on a two-year deal.

== Style of play ==
Wilks is a versatile forward whose main position was to play as a lone striker. During his time on loan at Doncaster Rovers, he has been converted into an attacking winger and plays on either wing. He is known for his pace and his physicality. His manager Grant McCann also described Wilks' style as flamboyant for his showboating skills.

== Personal life ==
Just three days before making his Leeds United debut, Wilks' brother Raheem had been killed outside a barber's shop in Leeds. Despite the tragedy, Wilks played in the FA Cup match against Sutton United. Three people were convicted of Raheem's murder in November 2017. On 9 July 2020, Wilks pleaded guilty to one count of affray and one count of assault occasioning actual bodily harm for his role in an incident on 28 August 2017. He was given an 18-month suspended sentence and ordered to pay £2900 in compensation to the victims.

== Career statistics ==
As of 7 May 2026

Appearances and goals by club, season and competition
Club	Season	League			National Cup		League Cup		Other		Total	
Club	Season	Division	Apps	Goals	Apps	Goals	Apps	Goals	Apps	Goals	Apps	Goals
Leeds United	2016–17	Championship	0	0	1	0	0	0	—		1	0
Leeds United	2017–18	Championship	0	0	0	0	0	0	—		0	0
Leeds United	2018–19	Championship	0	0	0	0	0	0	0	0	0	0
Leeds United	Total		0	0	1	0	0	0	0	0	1	0
Accrington Stanley (loan)	2017–18	League Two	18	3	1	0	—		4	2	23	5
Grimsby Town (loan)	2017–18	League Two	6	0	—		—		—		6	0
Doncaster Rovers (loan)	2018–19	League One	46	14	4	1	1	1	2	0	53	16
Barnsley	2019–20	Championship	15	1	0	0	1	0	—		16	1
Hull City (loan)	2019–20	Championship	12	4	1	0	—		—		13	4
Hull City	2019–20	Championship	6	1	0	0	0	0	—		6	1
Hull City	2020–21	League One	44	19	1	0	3	2	2 (Note: Appearance(s) in the EFL Trophy)	1	50	22
Hull City	2021–22	Championship	20	3	0	0	0	0	—		20	3
Hull City	2022–23	Championship	1	0	—		1	0	—		2	0
Hull City	Total		83	27	2	0	4	2	2	1	91	30
Sheffield Wednesday	2022–23	League One	16	1	5	0	0	0	3	1	24	2
Sheffield Wednesday	2023–24	Championship	15	0	3	1	0	0	—		18	1
Sheffield Wednesday	Total		31	1	8	1	0	0	3	1	42	3
Rotherham United (loan)	2024–25	League One	41	9	1	1	1	0	2	0	45	10
Pendikspor	2025–26	TFF 1. Lig	35	10	0	0	3	0	1 (Note: Appearance(s) in the TFF 1. Lig play-offs)	0	39	10
Career total			276	65	17	3	10	3	14	4	316	75

== Honours ==
Accrington Stanley

- EFL League Two: 2017–18

Hull City

- EFL League One: 2020–21

Individual

- PFA Team of the Year: 2020–21 League One
