= Chams Faraji =

French footballer (born 2000)

Personal information
- Full name: Chams-Eddine Faraji
- Date of birth: 1 September 2000 (age 26)
- Place of birth: France
- Height: 1.86 m (6 ft 1 in)
- Position: Defender

Youth career
- FC Villepinte
- Tremblay FC
- Espérance Aulnaysienne
- Fulham
- West Brom
- 2019: Hull City

Senior career*
| Years | Team | Apps | (Gls) |
| 2018–2019 | Greenwich Borough | | |
| 2019–2020 | Radomiak | 0 | (0) |
- * Club domestic league appearances and goals as of 31 August 2024

Chams-Eddine Faraji (born 1 September 2000) is a French footballer who plays as a defender.

== Career ==
As a youth player, Faraji joined the academies of English sides Fulham, West Brom and Hull City.

In 2019, Faraji signed for Radomiak in the Polish second division after playing for English eighth division club Greenwich Borough. He left the club on 3 March 2020, after asking for his contract to be terminated for personal reasons.
