= Kevin Stewart (footballer) =

Jamaican footballer (born 1993)

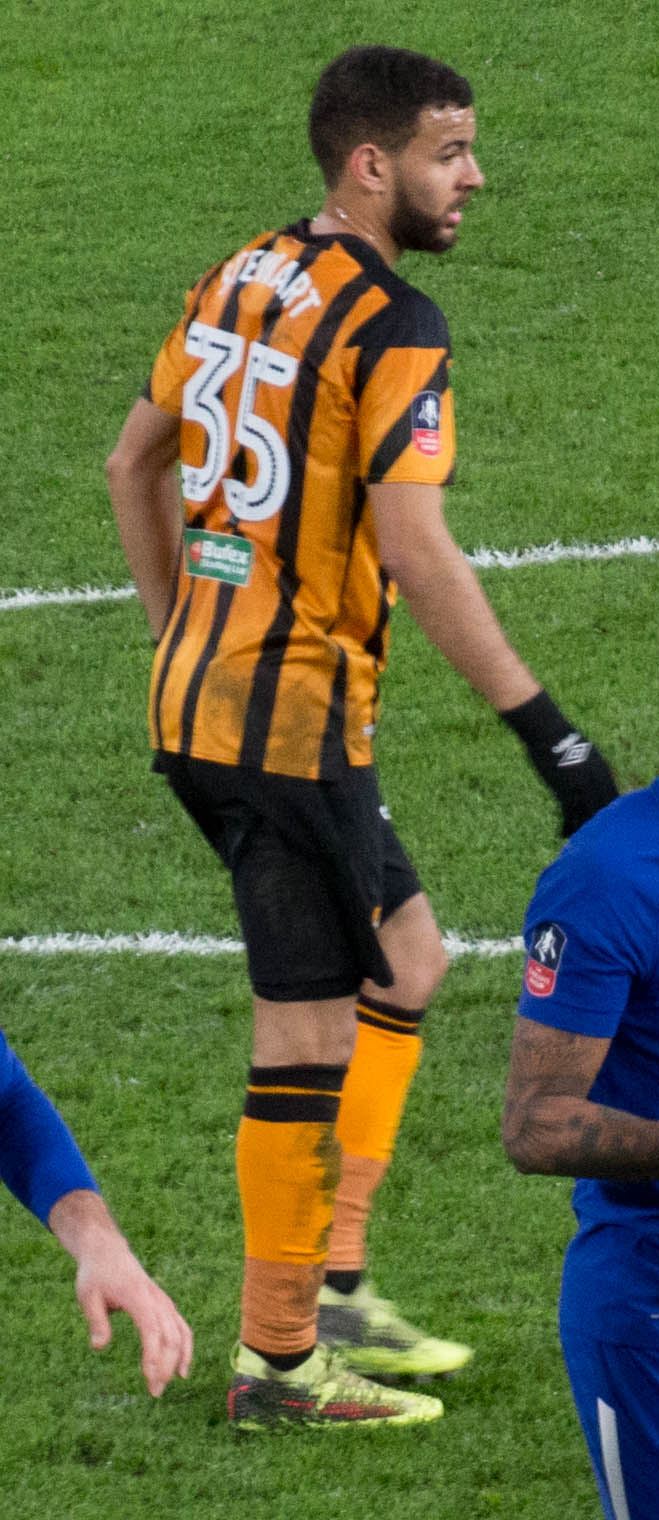
- Stewart in 2018

Personal information
- Full name: Kevin Linford Levi Stewart
- Date of birth: 7 September 1993 (age 33)
- Place of birth: Enfield, England
- Height: 5 ft 11 in (1.81 m)
- Position: Defensive midfielder

Youth career
- 2010–2013: Tottenham Hotspur

Senior career*
Years	Team	Apps	(Gls)
2013–2014	Tottenham Hotspur	0	(0)
2013	→ Crewe Alexandra (loan)	4	(0)
2014–2017	Liverpool	11	(0)
2015	→ Cheltenham Town (loan)	4	(1)
2015	→ Burton Albion (loan)	7	(2)
2015–2016	→ Swindon Town (loan)	5	(0)
2017–2020	Hull City	71	(3)
2021–2023	Blackpool	25	(0)
Total		127	(6)

International career^{‡}
2022	Jamaica	2	(0)
- * Club domestic league appearances and goals as of 09:56, 27 October 2022 (UTC) ‡ National team caps and goals as of 07:40, 15 June 2022 (UTC)

Kevin Linford Levi Stewart (born 7 September 1993) is a former professional footballer who played as a midfielder.

Born in England, he represented the Jamaica national team. He has previously played for Tottenham Hotspur, Crewe Alexandra, Liverpool, Cheltenham Town, Burton Albion, Swindon Town, Hull City and Blackpool.

== Early life ==
Stewart was born in Enfield, London and attended Enfield Grammar School. He signed for the Tottenham Hotspur Academy in July 2010.

== Club career ==
=== Tottenham Hotspur ===
At the end of March 2013, Stewart went on loan to Crewe Alexandra. On 1 April 2013, he made his Football League debut in the 1–0 win against Preston North End.

=== Liverpool ===
On 2 July 2014, Stewart joined Liverpool on a free transfer from Tottenham Hotspur on a two-year deal. Stewart announced the move on Twitter, stating that playing for Liverpool had been his dream since he was a boy.

==== Loan spells ====
On 1 January 2015, Stewart, along with two other Liverpool reserve players, signed for Cheltenham Town on a one-month loan deal. He made his Cheltenham debut on 3 January in a League Two match against Oxford United. He marked his debut by scoring in the 2–1 victory for Cheltenham. At the end of the month he was recalled to Liverpool, after picking-up an injury.

On 26 March 2015, Stewart joined Burton Albion on month-long loan. On the final day of the 2014–15 season, Stewart came off the bench in the 64th minute, and scored the winner which handed Burton Albion the League Two title.

On 11 July 2015, Stewart was loaned out to Swindon Town.

On 17 September, Stewart suffered a medial ligament injury in a Football League Trophy victory over Newport County, and was estimated to miss six to nine weeks. In January 2016 he was recalled by Liverpool from his loan.

==== Return to Liverpool ====
On 8 January 2016, Stewart was named in the first-team and made his competitive debut for Liverpool, starting the FA Cup third round match against Exeter City, a 2–2 draw. On 20 January, he started again in the FA Cup in the 3–0 home win over Exeter City.

He made his Premier League debut on 14 February in Liverpool's 6–0 win over Aston Villa, replacing Philippe Coutinho in the final 25 minutes. Stewart marked the occasion by being booked shortly afterwards by referee Neil Swarbrick.

On 23 February 2016, Stewart signed a new contract keeping him at the club until 2020.

=== Hull City ===
On 21 July 2017, Stewart signed a three-year deal with Hull City for an undisclosed fee. Stewart made his first start for the club on 19 August 2017 in a 2–1 away defeat to Queens Park Rangers. He scored his first goal for the club on 21 September 2019 in a 0–3 win away at Luton Town. Following the relegation of the club at the end of the 2019–20 season to the EFL League One, Stewart was released by the club.

=== Blackpool ===
On 23 January 2021, Stewart joined League One side Blackpool on an 18-month contract. He signed a new two-year contract with the club in June 2021.

== International career ==
Born in England, Stewart is of Jamaican descent. He was named in the preliminary squad for the Jamaica national team for the 2021 CONCACAF Gold Cup. He made his debut on 30 January 2022, as a substitute in a 3–2 defeat to Panama.

== Career statistics ==
As of match played 7 May 2022

Appearances and goals by club, season and competition
Club	Season	League			FA Cup		League Cup		Other		Total	
Club	Season	Division	Apps	Goals	Apps	Goals	Apps	Goals	Apps	Goals	Apps	Goals
Tottenham Hotspur	2012–13	Premier League	0	0	0	0	0	0	0	0	0	0
Tottenham Hotspur	2013–14	Premier League	0	0	0	0	0	0	0	0	0	0
Tottenham Hotspur	Total		0	0	0	0	0	0	0	0	0	0
Crewe Alexandra (loan)	2012–13	League One	4	0	0	0	0	0	0	0	4	0
Liverpool	2014–15	Premier League	0	0	0	0	0	0	0	0	0	0
Liverpool	2015–16	Premier League	7	0	4	0	0	0	0	0	11	0
Liverpool	2016–17	Premier League	4	0	2	0	3	0	0	0	9	0
Liverpool	Total		11	0	6	0	3	0	0	0	20	0
Cheltenham Town (loan)	2014–15	League Two	4	1	0	0	0	0	0	0	4	1
Burton Albion (loan)	2014–15	League Two	7	2	0	0	0	0	0	0	7	2
Swindon Town (loan)	2015–16	League One	5	0	0	0	1	0	1 (Note: Appearance in Football League Trophy)	0	7	0
Hull City	2017–18	Championship	17	0	3	0	0	0	0	0	20	0
Hull City	2018–19	Championship	27	0	1	0	2	0	0	0	30	0
Hull City	2019–20	Championship	27	3	0	0	1	0	0	0	28	3
Hull City	Total		71	3	4	0	3	0	0	0	78	3
Blackpool	2020–21	League One	13	0	0	0	0	0	3 (Note: Appearances in the EFL League One play-offs)	0	16	0
Blackpool	2021–22	Championship	12	0	0	0	0	0	0	0	12	0
Blackpool	Total		25	0	0	0	0	0	3	0	28	0
Career total			127	6	10	0	7	0	4	0	148	6

== Honours ==
Blackpool

- EFL League One play-offs: 2021
