= Will Annan =

Scottish footballer

Personal information
- Full name: William John Annan
- Date of birth: 5 September 1996 (age 30)
- Place of birth: Beverley, England
- Position: Midfielder

Team information
- Current team: Hull City
- Number: 31

Youth career
- 2008–2015: Hull City

Senior career*
Years	Team	Apps	(Gls)
2015–2018	Hull City	0	(0)
2018–2019	Scarborough Athletic	0	(0)
2019–2020	Tadcaster Albion	0	(0)
2020–	North Ferriby	0	(0)

International career^{‡}
2014	Scotland U19	1	(0)
- * Club domestic league appearances and goals as of 18:00, 23 August 2017 (UTC) ‡ National team caps and goals as of 18:00, 23 August 2017 (UTC)

William John Annan (born 5 September 1996) is a Scottish professional footballer who plays for North Ferriby as a midfielder.

== Club career ==
Annan joined Hull City at the age of twelve and signed professionally in 2015. On 22 August 2017, he made his debut in a 2–0 EFL Cup defeat to Doncaster Rovers. After three years at Hull Annan was released before subsequently signing for Northern Premier League Premier Division side Scarborough Athletic. In February 2020, Annan signed for North Ferriby.

== International career ==
On 12 August 2014, Annan made his international debut for Scotland Under-19s. He made a 20-minute appearance from the bench in a 2–0 defeat to Belgium Under-19s.

== Statistics ==
As of 22 August 2017.

Club	Season	League			FA Cup		League Cup		Other		Total	
Club	Season	Division	Apps	Goals	Apps	Goals	Apps	Goals	Apps	Goals	Apps	Goals
Hull City	2017–18	Championship	0	0	0	0	1	0	0	0	1	0
Career total			0	0	0	0	1	0	0	0	1	0
