= Tyler Hamilton (footballer) =

English footballer

Personal information
- Full name: Tyler Lee Hamilton
- Date of birth: 5 January 1999 (age 27)
- Place of birth: Kingston upon Hull, England
- Position: Midfielder

Youth career
- 2007–2017: Hull City

Senior career*
Years	Team	Apps	(Gls)
2017–2020	Hull City	0	(0)
2019–2020	→ Hartlepool United (loan)	6	(0)
2020–2021	Gainsborough Trinity	5	(0)
2021	North Ferriby	0	(0)
- * Club domestic league appearances and goals as of 22:39, 31 October 2022 (UTC)

Tyler Lee Hamilton (born 5 January 1999) is an English professional footballer.

== Club career ==
=== Hull City ===
Hamilton joined Hull City at the age of eight and signed a scholarship in July 2016. On 22 August 2017, he made his debut in a 2–0 EFL Cup defeat to Doncaster Rovers. On 28 February 2018, Hamilton signed a two-year contract with the club.

=== Hartlepool United (loan) ===
On 6 December 2019, Hamilton went on a month-long loan to Hartlepool United, this was later extended for a further month. Hamilton's loan was cut short on 30 January 2020 due to issues with his contract at Hull City. On 31 January 2020, Hamilton's contract with Hull City was terminated by mutual consent.

=== Gainsborough Trinity ===
On 29 September 2020, Hamilton signed for Gainsborough Trinity.

=== North Ferriby ===
On 17 March 2021, Hamilton registered with North Ferriby.

== Statistics ==
As of 27 October 2020

Season	Club	Division	League		FA Cup		League Cup		Other		Total	
Season	Club	Division	Apps	Goals	Apps	Goals	Apps	Goals	Apps	Goals	Apps	Goals
2017–18	Hull City	Championship	0	0	0	0	1	0	0	0	1	0
2019–20	Hartlepool United (loan)	National League	6	0	1	0	0	0	1	1	8	1
2020–21	Gainsborough Trinity	NPL Premier Division	5	0	0	0	0	0	0	0	5	0
Career total			11	0	1	0	1	0	1	1	14	1
