= Brad Jackson (disambiguation) =

Brad or Bradley Jackson may refer to:

- Brad Jackson (born 1975), American football player
- Brad Jackson (quarterback) (born 2005), American football player
- Brad Jackson (sailor), New Zealand sailor
- Bradley Jackson (director), director and producer, produced Milli Vanilli
- Bradley Jackson (footballer), English footballer
