= List of English football transfers summer 2017 =

This is a list of English football transfers for the 2017 summer transfer window. Only moves featuring at least one Premier League or Championship club are listed.

The summer transfer window began once clubs had concluded their final domestic fixture of the 2016–17 season, but many transfers only officially went through on 1 July because the majority of player contracts finished on 30 June. The window remained open until 18:00 BST on 1 September 2017. The window shut at 18:00 BST, this time due to the UEFA player registration deadlines for both the Champions League and Europa League ending at 23:00 BST, giving the six sides still in Europe time to conclude deals and register their player for continental matches if appropriate.

This list also includes transfers featuring at least one Premier League or Championship club which were completed after the end of the winter 2016–17 transfer window and before the end of the 2017 summer window.

Players without a club could join at any time, and clubs below Premier League level could sign players on loan during loan windows. Clubs could be permitted to sign a goalkeeper on an emergency loan if they had no registered goalkeeper available.

== 2017 Summer Transfers ==
All clubs without a flag are English. Note that while Swansea City, Cardiff City and Newport County are affiliated with the Football Association of Wales and thus take the Welsh flag, they play in the English football league system, and so their transfers are included here.

=== Transfers ===
Date	Name	Moving from	Moving to	Fee (Note: Transfer fees are gathered from the BBC and may not be exact)
2 February 2017	(Uruguay) Sebastián Coates	Sunderland	(Portugal) Sporting CP	Undisclosed
2 February 2017^{[b]}	(Sweden) Pontus Jansson	(Italy) Torino	Leeds United	Undisclosed
9 February 2017	(Ivory Coast) Cheick Tioté	Newcastle United	(China) Beijing Enterprises	Undisclosed
24 February 2017^{[b]}	(Algeria) Nabil Bentaleb	Tottenham Hotspur	(Germany) Schalke 04	Undisclosed
6 March 2017	(Denmark) Nicklas Bendtner	Nottingham Forest	(Norway) Rosenborg	Undisclosed
10 March 2017	(Wales) Alex Bray	(Wales) Swansea City	Rotherham United	Undisclosed
21 March 2017	(Germany) Bastian Schweinsteiger	Manchester United	(United States) Chicago Fire	Free
22 March 2017^{[b]}	(Democratic Republic of the Congo) Elias Kachunga	(Germany) Ingolstadt 04	Huddersfield Town	£1.1m
28 March 2017^{[b]}	(England) Semi Ajayi	(Wales) Cardiff City	Rotherham United	Undisclosed
31 March 2017^{[b]}	(England) Tom Cleverley	Everton	Watford	Undisclosed
8 May 2017	(England) Niall Mason	Aston Villa	Doncaster Rovers	Undisclosed
11 May 2017	(England) Craig Gardner	West Bromwich Albion	Birmingham City	Undisclosed
12 May 2017^{[a]}	(Scotland) Theo Archibald	(Scotland) Celtic	Brentford	Undisclosed
12 May 2017^{[b]}	(England) James Ferry	Brentford	Stevenage	Undisclosed
18 May 2017	(Scotland) Stevie Mallan	(Scotland) St Mirren	Barnsley	Undisclosed
19 May 2017	(England) Kyle Dempsey	Huddersfield Town	Fleetwood Town	Undisclosed
19 May 2017^{[a]}	(Germany) Pascal Groß	(Germany) Ingolstadt 04	Brighton & Hove Albion	Undisclosed
19 May 2017^{[b]}	(Luxembourg) Enes Mahmutovic	(Luxembourg) Fola Esch	Middlesbrough	Undisclosed
22 May 2017^{[b]}	(Colombia) Juan Cuadrado	Chelsea	(Italy) Juventus	£17m
23 May 2017	(Denmark) Henrik Dalsgaard	(Belgium) Zulte Waregem	Brentford	Undisclosed
23 May 2017^{[a]}	(Scotland) Josh Kerr	(Scotland) Celtic	Brighton & Hove Albion	Undisclosed
24 May 2017	(Ghana) Christian Atsu	Chelsea	Newcastle United	Undisclosed
26 May 2017^{[b]}	(Portugal) Bernardo Silva	(France) Monaco	Manchester City	£43m
30 May 2017^{[b]}	(Bosnia and Herzegovina) Asmir Begović	Chelsea	Bournemouth	Undisclosed
31 May 2017^{[b]}	(Turkey) Enes Ünal	Manchester City	(Spain) Villarreal	£11.9m
2 June 2017	(France) Hadi Sacko	(Portugal) Sporting CP	Leeds United	Undisclosed
3 June 2017^{[d]}	(Republic of Ireland) Sean Maguire	(Republic of Ireland) Cork City	Preston North End	Undisclosed
6 June 2017	(Australia) Cameron Burgess	Fulham	Scunthorpe United	Undisclosed
7 June 2017	(England) Curtis Davies	Hull City	Derby County	Undisclosed
8 June 2017^{[b]}	(Brazil) Ederson	(Portugal) Benfica	Manchester City	£35m
8 June 2017^{[b]}	(England) Sam Hughes	Chester	Leicester City	Compensation
8 June 2017	(Bosnia and Herzegovina) Mario Vrančić	(Germany) Darmstadt 98	Norwich City	Undisclosed
9 June 2017^{[b]}	(France) Florian Thauvin	Newcastle United	(France) Marseille	Undisclosed
10 June 2017	(United States) Brad Guzan	Middlesbrough	(United States) Atlanta United	Free
13 June 2017	(England) George Baldock	Milton Keynes Dons	Sheffield United	Undisclosed
13 June 2017	(Germany) Philipp Hofmann	Brentford	(Germany) Greuther Fürth	Undisclosed
13 June 2017	(England) Jason McCarthy	Southampton	Barnsley	Undisclosed
13 June 2017	(Portugal) Roderick	(Portugal) Rio Ave	Wolverhampton Wanderers	Undisclosed
14 June 2017^{[b]}	(Sweden) Victor Lindelöf	(Portugal) Benfica	Manchester United	£31m
15 June 2017	(Netherlands) Davy Klaassen	(Netherlands) Ajax	Everton	£23.6m
15 June 2017	(England) Harry Maguire	Hull City	Leicester City	£12m (Note: Potentially rising to £17m)
15 June 2017	(Switzerland) Kevin Mbabu	Newcastle United	(Switzerland) Young Boys	Undisclosed
15 June 2017	(England) Jordan Pickford	Sunderland	Everton	£25m (Note: Potentially rising to £30m)
16 June 2017	(England) Joe Garner	(Scotland) Rangers	Ipswich Town	Undisclosed
16 June 2017^{[b]}	(Australia) Mathew Ryan	(Spain) Valencia	Brighton & Hove Albion	£5m
17 June 2017	(Scotland) Jason Cummings	(Scotland) Hibernian	Nottingham Forest	Undisclosed
19 June 2017	(England) Tariqe Fosu	Reading	Charlton Athletic	Undisclosed
19 June 2017	(Netherlands) Nathangelo Markelo	(Netherlands) Volendam	Everton	Undisclosed
20 June 2017	(Northern Ireland) Liam Boyce	(Scotland) Ross County	Burton Albion	Undisclosed
20 June 2017	(Norway) Håvard Nordtveit	West Ham United	(Germany) TSG 1899 Hoffenheim	Undisclosed
20 June 2017^{[b]}	(England) Declan Rudd	Norwich City	Preston North End	Undisclosed
22 June 2017	(England) Sam Hornby	Burton Albion	Port Vale	Free
22 June 2017	(Scotland) Ali Coote	(Scotland) Dundee United	Brentford	Undisclosed
22 June 2017	(Republic of Ireland) Graham Kelly	Sheffield United	Port Vale	Free
22 June 2017	(Scotland) Liam Lindsay	(Scotland) Partick Thistle	Barnsley	Undisclosed
22 June 2017^{[b]}	(Egypt) Mohamed Salah	(Italy) Roma	Liverpool	£34m
23 June 2017	(Belgium) Laurent Depoitre	(Portugal) Porto	Huddersfield Town	£3.5m
23 June 2017^{[c]}	(England) Josh Harrop	Manchester United	Preston North End	Undisclosed
23 June 2017	(Poland) Mateusz Klich	(Netherlands) Twente	Leeds United	Undisclosed
23 June 2017	(England) Cameron McGeehan	Luton Town	Barnsley	Undisclosed
23 June 2017	(England) Danny Ward	Rotherham United	(Wales) Cardiff City	Undisclosed
24 June 2017	(England) Will Hughes	Derby County	Watford	£8m
26 June 2017	(Scotland) Zak Jules	Reading	Shrewsbury Town	Undisclosed
26 June 2017	(Northern Ireland) George Saville	Wolverhampton Wanderers	Millwall	Undisclosed
26 June 2017	(England) Jack Stacey	Reading	Luton Town	Undisclosed
26 June 2017	(Burkina Faso) Bertrand Traoré	Chelsea	(France) Lyon	£8.8m
26 June 2017	(England) Jed Wallace	Wolverhampton Wanderers	Millwall	Undisclosed
28 June 2017	(Netherlands) Pelle Clement	(Netherlands) Ajax	Reading	Undisclosed
28 June 2017	(Senegal) Famara Diédhiou	(France) Angers	Bristol City	£5.3m
28 June 2017	(Denmark) Viktor Fischer	Middlesbrough	(Germany) Mainz 05	Undisclosed
28 June 2017	(England) Ben Gladwin	Queens Park Rangers	Blackburn Rovers	Undisclosed
28 June 2017	(France) Bafétimbi Gomis	(Wales) Swansea City	(Turkey) Galatasaray	Undisclosed
28 June 2017	(Wales) Emyr Huws	(Wales) Cardiff City	Ipswich Town	Undisclosed
29 June 2017	(England) Kundai Benyu	Ipswich Town	(Scotland) Celtic	Compensation
29 June 2017	(England) Jermain Defoe	Sunderland	Bournemouth	Free
29 June 2017	(Wales) Michael Doughty	Queens Park Rangers	Peterborough United	Undisclosed
29 June 2017	(Republic of Ireland) Conor Wilkinson	Bolton Wanderers	Gillingham	Undisclosed
30 June 2017	(Netherlands) Nathan Aké	Chelsea	Bournemouth	£20m
30 June 2017	(Australia) Aaron Mooy	Manchester City	Huddersfield Town	£8m (Note: Potentially rising to £10m)
30 June 2017^{[d]}	(Republic of Ireland) Kevin O'Connor	(Republic of Ireland) Cork City	Preston North End	Undisclosed
30 June 2017	(Nigeria) Henry Onyekuru	(Belgium) Eupen	Everton	£7m
30 June 2017	(England) Ethan Pinnock	Forest Green Rovers	Barnsley	Undisclosed
30 June 2017	(Germany) Felix Wiedwald	(Germany) Werder Bremen	Leeds United	Undisclosed
1 July 2017	(Wales) Ethan Ampadu	Exeter City	Chelsea	Compensation
1 July 2017	(Poland) Jan Bednarek	(Poland) Lech Poznań	Southampton	£5m
1 July 2017	(Scotland) Barry Douglas	(Turkey) Konyaspor	Wolverhampton Wanderers	Undisclosed
1 July 2017	(Republic of Ireland) Niall Keown	Reading	(Scotland) Partick Thistle	Undisclosed
1 July 2017	(England) Marc Roberts	Barnsley	Birmingham City	Undisclosed
2 July 2017	(England) Jay Rodriguez	Southampton	West Bromwich Albion	£12m
3 July 2017	(England) Michael Keane	Burnley	Everton	£25m (Note: Potentially rising to £30m)
3 July 2017	(Spain) Marcelo	(Spain) Lugo	Fulham	Undisclosed
3 July 2017	(England) Jamie Proctor	Bolton Wanderers	Rotherham United	Undisclosed
3 July 2017	(Spain) Sandro	(Spain) Málaga	Everton	£5.2m
3 July 2017	(England) Andre Wisdom	Liverpool	Derby County	£3m
3 July 2017	(China) Zhang Yuning	(Netherlands) Vitesse	West Bromwich Albion	Undisclosed
4 July 2017	(England) Tom Ince	Derby County	Huddersfield Town	Undisclosed
4 July 2017	(Spain) Jozabed	Fulham	(Spain) Celta Vigo	Undisclosed
4 July 2017	(France) Florian Lejeune	(Spain) Eibar	Newcastle United	£8.7m
4 July 2017	(England) Connor Mahoney	Blackburn Rovers	Bournemouth	Compensation
5 July 2017	(France) Alexandre Lacazette	(France) Lyon	Arsenal	£46.5m (Note: Potentially rising to £52.6m)
5 July 2017	(England) Scott Malone	Fulham	Huddersfield Town	Undisclosed
5 July 2017	(Scotland) Barrie McKay	(Scotland) Rangers	Nottingham Forest	£500,000
5 July 2017	(Benin) Steve Mounié	(France) Montpellier	Huddersfield Town	£11.44m
5 July 2017	(England) Josh Tymon	Hull City	Stoke City	Compensation
6 July 2017	(Scotland) Graham Dorrans	Norwich City	(Scotland) Rangers	Undisclosed
6 July 2017	(Spain) Vicente Iborra	(Spain) Sevilla	Leicester City	£10.5m
6 July 2017	(Spain) Roque Mesa	(Spain) Las Palmas	(Wales) Swansea City	£11m
6 July 2017	(Spain) Rubén Sobrino	Manchester City	(Spain) Alavés	Undisclosed
6 July 2017	(England) Richard Stearman	Fulham	Sheffield United	Undisclosed
6 July 2017	(England) Charlie Taylor	Leeds United	Burnley	Compensation
7 July 2017	(Colombia) Bernardo	Middlesbrough	(Spain) Girona	Undisclosed
7 July 2017	(England) Josh Bowler	Queens Park Rangers	Everton	Undisclosed
7 July 2017	(Republic of Ireland) Cyrus Christie	Derby County	Middlesbrough	Undisclosed
7 July 2017	(Belgium) Ibrahima Cissé	(Belgium) Standard Liège	Fulham	Undisclosed
7 July 2017	(England) Jonny Howson	Norwich City	Middlesbrough	Undisclosed
7 July 2017	(Denmark) Mathias Jørgensen	(Denmark) Copenhagen	Huddersfield Town	£3.5m
7 July 2017	(South Africa) Kamohelo Mokotjo	(Netherlands) Twente	Brentford	Undisclosed
7 July 2017	(Republic of Ireland) Jonathan Walters	Stoke City	Burnley	£3m
8 July 2017	(Portugal) Rúben Neves	(Portugal) Porto	Wolverhampton Wanderers	£15.8m
9 July 2017	(England) Kaylen Hinds	Arsenal	(Germany) VfL Wolfsburg	Undisclosed
9 July 2017	(England) Wayne Rooney	Manchester United	Everton	Undisclosed
9 July 2017	(Germany) Antonio Rüdiger	(Italy) Roma	Chelsea	£29m
10 July 2017	(Belgium) Romelu Lukaku	Everton	Manchester United	£75m (Note: Potentially rising to £90m)
10 July 2017	(Ghana) Elvis Manu	Brighton & Hove Albion	(Turkey) Gençlerbirliği	Free
10 July 2017	(Portugal) Filipe Melo	Sheffield Wednesday	(Portugal) Chaves	Free
11 July 2017	(England) Jack Cork	(Wales) Swansea City	Burnley	£8m (Note: Potentially rising to £10m)
11 July 2017	(Italy) Caleb Ekuban	(Italy) Chievo Verona	Leeds United	Undisclosed
11 July 2017	(England) James Husband	Middlesbrough	Norwich City	Undisclosed
11 July 2017	(France) Steve Mandanda	Crystal Palace	(France) Marseille	Undisclosed
11 July 2017	(England) Will Norris	Cambridge United	Wolverhampton Wanderers	Undisclosed
11 July 2017	(England) Dominic Solanke	Chelsea	Liverpool	£3m
11 July 2017	(Spain) Mario Suárez	Watford	(China) Guizhou Hengfeng Zhicheng	Undisclosed
11 July 2017	(Germany) Ron-Robert Zieler	Leicester City	(Germany) VfB Stuttgart	Undisclosed
11 July 2017	(Argentina) Bruno Zuculini	Manchester City	(Italy) Hellas Verona	Undisclosed
12 July 2017	(Belgium) Adnan Januzaj	Manchester United	(Spain) Real Sociedad	£9.8m
12 July 2017	(England) Luke McGee	Tottenham Hotspur	Portsmouth	Undisclosed
12 July 2017	(France) Olivier Ntcham	Manchester City	(Scotland) Celtic	£4.5m
12 July 2017	(England) Tre Pemberton	Blackburn Rovers	Stoke City	Undisclosed
13 July 2017	(North Macedonia) Ezgjan Alioski	(Switzerland) Lugano	Leeds United	Undisclosed
13 July 2017	(Denmark) Martin Braithwaite	(France) Toulouse	Middlesbrough	Undisclosed
13 July 2017	(England) Nathaniel Chalobah	Chelsea	Watford	Undisclosed
13 July 2017	(England) Rob Hunt	Brighton & Hove Albion	Oldham Athletic	Undisclosed
13 July 2017	(Republic of Ireland) Aiden McGeady	Everton	Sunderland	Undisclosed
13 July 2017	(Spain) Samu Sáiz	(Spain) Huesca	Leeds United	Undisclosed
13 July 2017	(Austria) Markus Suttner	(Germany) Ingolstadt 04	Brighton & Hove Albion	Undisclosed
13 July 2017	(England) Lee Tomlin	Bristol City	(Wales) Cardiff City	£2.9m
13 July 2017	(Ecuador) Enner Valencia	West Ham United	(Mexico) Tigres	Undisclosed
13 July 2017	(England) James Vaughan	Bury	Sunderland	£900,000
14 July 2017	(Iceland) Jón Daði Böðvarsson	Wolverhampton Wanderers	Reading	Undisclosed
14 July 2017	(Spain) Gerard Deulofeu	Everton	(Spain) Barcelona	£10.6m
14 July 2017	(Germany) Marcel Franke	(Germany) Greuther Fürth	Norwich City	Undisclosed
14 July 2017	(France) Neal Maupay	(France) Saint-Étienne	Brentford	Undisclosed
14 July 2017	(England) George Miller	Bury	Middlesbrough	Undisclosed
14 July 2017	(England) Brett Pitman	Ipswich Town	Portsmouth	Undisclosed
14 July 2017	(England) Kyle Walker	Tottenham Hotspur	Manchester City	£45m (Note: Potentially rising to £50m)
15 July 2017	(France) Tiémoué Bakayoko	(France) Monaco	Chelsea	£40m
15 July 2017	(Argentina) Federico Fazio	Tottenham Hotspur	(Italy) Roma	Undisclosed
15 July 2017	(England) Tom Huddlestone	Hull City	Derby County	£2m
15 July 2017	(Brazil) Douglas Luiz	(Brazil) Vasco da Gama	Manchester City	Undisclosed
16 July 2017	(England) George Dobson	West Ham United	(Netherlands) Sparta Rotterdam	Undisclosed
16 July 2017	(Cameroon) Clinton N'Jie	Tottenham Hotspur	(France) Marseille	Undisclosed
16 July 2017	(Spain) Nolito	Manchester City	(Spain) Sevilla	£7.9m
17 July 2017	(Oman) Ali Al-Habsi	Reading	(Saudi Arabia) Al-Hilal	Undisclosed
17 July 2017	(England) Mukhtar Ali	Chelsea	(Netherlands) Vitesse	Undisclosed
17 July 2017	(Democratic Republic of the Congo) Britt Assombalonga	Nottingham Forest	Middlesbrough	£15m
17 July 2017	(England) Daniel Crowley	Arsenal	(Netherlands) Willem II	Undisclosed
17 July 2017	(Republic of Ireland) Courtney Duffus	Everton	Oldham Athletic	Undisclosed
17 July 2017	(Wales) Cian Harries	Coventry City	(Wales) Swansea City	Undisclosed
17 July 2017	(England) Cole Kpekawa	Barnsley	Colchester United	Undisclosed
18 July 2017	(Denmark) Lasse Vigen Christensen	Fulham	(Denmark) Brøndby	Undisclosed
18 July 2017	(Scotland) Ryan Fulton	Liverpool	(Scotland) Hamilton Academical	Free
18 July 2017	(Brazil) Lucas	Liverpool	(Italy) Lazio	£5m
18 July 2017	(England) Ollie Watkins	Exeter City	Brentford	Undisclosed
19 July 2017	(Egypt) Ahmed Elmohamady	Hull City	Aston Villa	£1m
19 July 2017	(Bosnia and Herzegovina) Eldin Jakupović	Hull City	Leicester City	Undisclosed
19 July 2017	(Italy) Vito Mannone	Sunderland	Reading	£2m
19 July 2017	(England) Jacob Murphy	Norwich City	Newcastle United	£12m
19 July 2017	(England) Dominic Samuel	Reading	Blackburn Rovers	Undisclosed
19 July 2017	(Italy) Marco Silvestri	Leeds United	(Italy) Hellas Verona	Undisclosed
19 July 2017	(Poland) Wojciech Szczęsny	Arsenal	(Italy) Juventus	£10m
20 July 2017	(Turkey) Kerim Frei	Birmingham City	(Turkey) İstanbul Başakşehir	Undisclosed
20 July 2017	(Peru) Paolo Hurtado	Reading	(Portugal) Vitória de Guimarães	Undisclosed
20 July 2017	(Norway) Mathias Normann	(Norway) Bodø/Glimt	Brighton & Hove Albion	Undisclosed
20 July 2017	(Republic of Ireland) Glenn Whelan	Stoke City	Aston Villa	£1m
21 July 2017	(England) Kayden Jackson	Barnsley	Accrington Stanley	Undisclosed
21 July 2017	(Spain) Javier Manquillo	(Spain) Atlético Madrid	Newcastle United	Undisclosed
21 July 2017	(Spain) Álvaro Morata	(Spain) Real Madrid	Chelsea	£60m
21 July 2017	(Republic of Ireland) Daryl Murphy	Newcastle United	Nottingham Forest	Undisclosed
21 July 2017	(Scotland) Andy Robertson	Hull City	Liverpool	£8m (Note: Potentially rising to £10m)
21 July 2017	(Algeria) Idriss Saadi	(Wales) Cardiff City	(France) Strasbourg	Undisclosed
21 July 2017	(England) Kevin Stewart	Liverpool	Hull City	£8m
21 July 2017	(Uruguay) Cristhian Stuani	Middlesbrough	(Spain) Girona	Undisclosed
22 July 2017	(Austria) Marko Arnautović	Stoke City	West Ham United	£20m (Note: Potentially rising to £25m)
22 July 2017	(Republic of Ireland) Darren Randolph	West Ham United	Middlesbrough	£5m
22 July 2017	(Serbia) Aleksandar Kolarov	Manchester City	(Italy) Roma	£4.5m
23 July 2017	(Brazil) Danilo	(Spain) Real Madrid	Manchester City	£26.5m
24 July 2017	(Mexico) Javier Hernández	(Germany) Bayer Leverkusen	West Ham United	£16m
24 July 2017	(England) James Horsfield	Manchester City	(Netherlands) NAC	Undisclosed
24 July 2017	(France) Benjamin Mendy	(France) Monaco	Manchester City	£52m
24 July 2017	(Netherlands) Jaïro Riedewald	(Netherlands) Ajax	Crystal Palace	Undisclosed
25 July 2017	(Scotland) Phil Bardsley	Stoke City	Burnley	Undisclosed
25 July 2017	(England) John Lundstram	Oxford United	Sheffield United	Undisclosed
25 July 2017	(France) Jordan Veretout	Aston Villa	(Italy) Fiorentina	Undisclosed
26 July 2017	(England) Callum Burton	Shrewsbury Town	Hull City	Undisclosed
26 July 2017	(England) Tendayi Darikwa	Burnley	Nottingham Forest	Undisclosed
26 July 2017	(England) Darnell Fisher	Rotherham United	Preston North End	Undisclosed
26 July 2017	(Czech Republic) Ondřej Mazuch	(Czech Republic) Sparta Prague	Hull City	Undisclosed
26 July 2017	(England) Jason Steele	Blackburn Rovers	Sunderland	Undisclosed
27 July 2017	(Greece) Andreas Bouchalakis	(Greece) Olympiacos	Nottingham Forest	Free
27 July 2017	(England) Lewis Gibson	Newcastle United	Everton	Undisclosed
28 July 2017	(England) Nathan Baker	Aston Villa	Bristol City	Undisclosed
28 July 2017	(England) Jake Cooper	Reading	Millwall	Undisclosed
28 July 2017	(Scotland) Lee Erwin	Leeds United	(Scotland) Kilmarnock	Free
28 July 2017	(England) Ashley Fletcher	West Ham United	Middlesbrough	£6.5m
31 July 2017	(England) Tristan Abrahams	Leyton Orient	Norwich City	Undisclosed
31 July 2017	(England) Steven Alzate	Leyton Orient	Brighton & Hove Albion	Undisclosed
31 July 2017	(Netherlands) Steven Berghuis	Watford	(Netherlands) Feyenoord	Undisclosed
31 July 2017	(France) Aboubakar Kamara	(France) Amiens	Fulham	£5m
31 July 2017	(Serbia) Nemanja Matić	Chelsea	Manchester United	£40m
1 August 2017	(Denmark) Mads Bech Sørensen	(Denmark) Horsens	Brentford	Undisclosed
3 August 2017	(The Gambia) Modou Barrow	(Wales) Swansea City	Reading	£1.5m
3 August 2017	(Nigeria) Kelechi Iheanacho	Manchester City	Leicester City	£25m
3 August 2017	(England) Brad Potts	Blackpool	Barnsley	Undisclosed
3 August 2017	(England) Aaron Wilbraham	Bristol City	Bolton Wanderers	Undisclosed
4 August 2017	(England) Harry Bunn	Huddersfield Town	Bury	Undisclosed
4 August 2017	(Brazil) Fernando	Manchester City	(Turkey) Galatasaray	Undisclosed
4 August 2017	(Czech Republic) Aleš Matějů	(Czech Republic) Viktoria Plzeň	Brighton & Hove Albion	Undisclosed
4 August 2017	(England) Matty Pearson	Accrington Stanley	Barnsley	Undisclosed
4 August 2017	(Uruguay) Gastón Ramírez	Middlesbrough	(Italy) Sampdoria	Undisclosed
6 August 2017	(Germany) Marco Stiepermann	(Germany) VfL Bochum	Norwich City	Undisclosed
7 August 2017	(Montenegro) Sead Hakšabanović	(Sweden) Halmstad	West Ham United	£2.7m
7 August 2017	(Netherlands) Davy Pröpper	(Netherlands) PSV	Brighton & Hove Albion	£6m
7 August 2017	(England) Martyn Waghorn	(Scotland) Rangers	Ipswich Town	Undisclosed
8 August 2017	(England) Harry Cornick	Bournemouth	Luton Town	Undisclosed
8 August 2017	(Sweden) Niclas Eliasson	(Sweden) Norrköping	Bristol City	£1.8m
8 August 2017	(England) Adam Legzdins	Birmingham City	Burnley	Undisclosed
8 August 2017	(Gabon) Mario Lemina	(Italy) Juventus	Southampton	£15.4m (Note: Potentially rising to £18.1m)
8 August 2017	(Brazil) Richarlison	(Brazil) Fluminense	Watford	£11m
8 August 2017	(Wales) George Thomas	Coventry City	Leicester City	Undisclosed
9 August 2017	(England) Andre Gray	Burnley	Watford	£18.5m
10 August 2017	(Netherlands) Soufyan Ahannach	(Netherlands) Almere City	Brighton & Hove Albion	Undisclosed
10 August 2017	(Netherlands) Marten de Roon	Middlesbrough	(Italy) Atalanta	Undisclosed
10 August 2017	(Scotland) Stevie May	Preston North End	(Scotland) Aberdeen	Undisclosed
11 August 2017	(Sweden) Zackarias Faour	Manchester City	(Sweden) Sirius	Undisclosed
11 August 2017	(Netherlands) Bruno Martins Indi	(Portugal) Porto	Stoke City	£7m
11 August 2017	(Senegal) Mamadou Thiam	(France) Dijon	Barnsley	Undisclosed
13 August 2017	(Curaçao) Leandro Bacuna	Aston Villa	Reading	Undisclosed
14 August 2017	(Algeria) Sofiane Feghouli	West Ham United	(Turkey) Galatasaray	£3.87m
14 August 2017	(England) Isaac Vassell	Luton Town	Birmingham City	Undisclosed
15 August 2017	(England) Gareth Barry	Everton	West Bromwich Albion	Undisclosed
15 August 2017	(Wales) Tom Lawrence	Leicester City	Derby County	£5m (Note: Potentially rising to £7m)
16 August 2017	(Spain) Joselu	Stoke City	Newcastle United	£5m
16 August 2017	(Iceland) Gylfi Sigurðsson	(Wales) Swansea City	Everton	£45m
17 August 2017	(England) Omar Bogle	Wigan Athletic	(Wales) Swansea City	Undisclosed
17 August 2017	(France) Dimitri Cavaré	(France) Rennes	Barnsley	Undisclosed
17 August 2017	(Portugal) Rui Fonte	(Portugal) Braga	Fulham	Undisclosed
18 August 2017	(Nigeria) Olarenwaju Kayode	Austria Vienna	Manchester City	Undisclosed
18 August 2017	(Brazil) Gabriel Paulista	Arsenal	(Spain) Valencia	Undisclosed
18 August 2017	(England) Stefan Payne	Barnsley	Shrewsbury Town	Undisclosed
18 August 2017	(England) Sean Raggett	Lincoln City	Norwich City	Undisclosed
20 August 2017	(Colombia) José Izquierdo	(Belgium) Club Brugge	Brighton & Hove Albion	£13.5m
21 August 2017	(Algeria) Ismaël Bennacer	Arsenal	(Italy) Empoli	Undisclosed
21 August 2017	(France) Samir Nasri	Manchester City	(Turkey) Antalyaspor	£3.2m
21 August 2017	(New Zealand) Chris Wood	Leeds United	Burnley	£15m
22 August 2017	(Scotland) Liam Bridcutt	Leeds United	Nottingham Forest	Undisclosed
22 August 2017	(Greece) Savvas Mourgos	Arsenal	Norwich City	Undisclosed
23 August 2017	(England) Sam Clucas	Hull City	(Wales) Swansea City	Undisclosed
23 August 2017	(Argentina) Paulo Gazzaniga	Southampton	Tottenham Hotspur	Undisclosed
23 August 2017	(Scotland) Stephen Kingsley	(Wales) Swansea City	Hull City	Undisclosed
23 August 2017	(Morocco) Abdelhamid Sabiri	(Germany) 1. FC Nürnberg	Huddersfield Town	Undisclosed
23 August 2017	(Colombia) Davinson Sánchez	(Netherlands) Ajax	Tottenham Hotspur	£42m
24 August 2017	(Netherlands) Jay-Roy Grot	(Netherlands) NEC	Leeds United	Undisclosed
24 August 2017	(Spain) Jon Toral	Arsenal	Hull City	Undisclosed
25 August 2017	(Scotland) Oliver Burke	(Germany) RB Leipzig	West Bromwich Albion	£15m
25 August 2017	(France) Emmanuel Rivière	Newcastle United	(France) Metz	Undisclosed
26 August 2017	(Wales) David Edwards	Wolverhampton Wanderers	Reading	Undisclosed
27 August 2017	(England) Andy Lonergan	Wolverhampton Wanderers	Leeds United	Free
28 August 2017	(Netherlands) Siem de Jong	Newcastle United	(Netherlands) Ajax	£4m
29 August 2017	(Nigeria) Sone Aluko	Fulham	Reading	£7.5m
29 August 2017	(Mali) Nouha Dicko	Wolverhampton Wanderers	Hull City	Undisclosed
29 August 2017	(Austria) Kevin Wimmer	Tottenham Hotspur	Stoke City	£18m
30 August 2017	(England) Harlee Dean	Brentford	Birmingham City	Undisclosed
30 August 2017	(Argentina) Juan Foyth	(Argentina) Estudiantes	Tottenham Hotspur	£8m
30 August 2017	(England) Kieran Gibbs	Arsenal	West Bromwich Albion	£7m
30 August 2017	(Scotland) Grant Hanley	Newcastle United	Norwich City	Undisclosed
30 August 2017	(Australia) Jackson Irvine	Burton Albion	Hull City	Undisclosed
30 August 2017	(Netherlands) Joost van Aken	(Netherlands) Heerenveen	Sheffield Wednesday	Undisclosed
30 August 2017	(England) Ryan Shotton	Birmingham City	Middlesbrough	Undisclosed
31 August 2017	(England) Jamie Allen	Rochdale	Burton Albion	Undisclosed
31 August 2017	(Ivory Coast) Serge Aurier	(France) Paris Saint-Germain	Tottenham Hotspur	£23m
31 August 2017	(England) Tyreeq Bakinson	Luton Town	Bristol City	Undisclosed
31 August 2017	(Ivory Coast) Wilfried Bony	Manchester City	(Wales) Swansea City	Undisclosed
31 August 2017	(Sweden) Paweł Cibicki	(Sweden) Malmö	Leeds United	Undisclosed
31 August 2017	(France) Maxime Colin	Brentford	Birmingham City	Undisclosed
31 August 2017	(Jamaica) Clayton Donaldson	Birmingham City	Sheffield United	Undisclosed
31 August 2017	(Republic of Ireland) Rory Holden	(Northern Ireland) Derry City	Bristol City	Undisclosed
31 August 2017	(England) Marvin Johnson	Oxford United	Middlesbrough	Undisclosed
31 August 2017	(Spain) Jota	Brentford	Birmingham City	Undisclosed
31 August 2017	(Netherlands) Maikel Kieftenbeld	Birmingham City	Derby County	Undisclosed
31 August 2017	(Spain) Fernando Llorente	(Wales) Swansea City	Tottenham Hotspur	Undisclosed
31 August 2017	(England) Sam Hart	Liverpool	Blackburn Rovers	Undisclosed
31 August 2017	(Netherlands) Donyell Malen	Arsenal	(Netherlands) PSV	Undisclosed
31 August 2017	(England) Malakai Mars	Chelsea	Barnet	Undisclosed
31 August 2017	(England) Callum McManaman	West Bromwich Albion	Sunderland	Undisclosed
31 August 2017	(England) William Miller	Tottenham Hotspur	Burton Albion	Undisclosed
31 August 2017	(England) Craig Noone	(Wales) Cardiff City	Bolton Wanderers	Undisclosed
31 August 2017	(England) Manny Onariase	Brentford	Rotherham United	Undisclosed
31 August 2017	(England) Alex Oxlade-Chamberlain	Arsenal	Liverpool	£35m
31 August 2017	(England) Jadon Sancho	Manchester City	(Germany) Borussia Dortmund	£10m
31 August 2017	(Italy) Ezequiel Schelotto	(Portugal) Sporting CP	Brighton & Hove Albion	Undisclosed
31 August 2017	(Croatia) Nikola Vlašić	(Croatia) Hajduk Split	Everton	£10m
31 August 2017	(Bermuda) Nahki Wells	Huddersfield Town	Burnley	£5m
31 August 2017	(England) David Wheeler	Exeter City	Queens Park Ranger	Undisclosed
31 August 2017	(Republic of Ireland) Marc Wilson	Bournemouth	Sunderland	Undisclosed
31 August 2017	(Italy) Davide Zappacosta	(Italy) Torino	Chelsea	Undisclosed
31 August 2017	(Netherlands) Marvin Zeegelaar	(Portugal) Sporting CP	Watford	Undisclosed
1 September 2017	(England) Danny Drinkwater	Leicester City	Chelsea	£35m
1 September 2017	(Nigeria) Bright Osayi-Samuel	Blackpool	Queens Park Rangers	Undisclosed
1 September 2017	(France) Mamadou Sakho	Liverpool	Crystal Palace	£26m

=== Loans ===
Date	Name	Moving from	Moving to
6 February 2017	(Portugal) Licá	Nottingham Forest	(Portugal) Estoril
25 February 2017	(England) Harry Burgoyne	Wolverhampton Wanderers	Barnet
31 March 2017	(Sweden) Gustav Engvall	Bristol City	(Sweden) Djurgårdens IF
1 April 2017	(England) Christian Walton	Brighton & Hove Albion	Southend United
12 May 2017	(England) Michee Efete	Norwich City	(Iceland) Breiðablik
6 June 2017^{[b]}	(England) Angus Gunn	Manchester City	Norwich City
16 June 2017^{[b]}	(Australia) Anthony Cáceres	Manchester City	(Australia) Melbourne City
18 June 2017	(Serbia) Danilo Pantić	Chelsea	(Serbia) Partizan
21 June 2017^{[b]}	(England) Nathan Baxter	Chelsea	Woking
21 June 2017	(England) Reece Oxford	West Ham United	(Germany) Borussia Mönchengladbach
22 June 2017	(Japan) Takuma Asano	Arsenal	(Germany) VfB Stuttgart
22 June 2017	(Republic of Ireland) Ryan Delaney	Burton Albion	(Republic of Ireland) Cork City
22 June 2017	(Denmark) Nikolaj Kirk	(Denmark) Midtjylland	Brentford
22 June 2017	(Belgium) Matz Sels	Newcastle United	(Belgium) Anderlecht
22 June 2017	(England) Benjamin Whiteman	Sheffield United	Doncaster Rovers
24 June 2017	(France) Thierry Ambrose	Manchester City	(Netherlands) NAC
24 June 2017	(Spain) Paolo Fernandes	Manchester City	(Netherlands) NAC
24 June 2017	(Spain) Pablo Marí	Manchester City	(Netherlands) NAC
25 June 2017	(England) Fankaty Dabo	Chelsea	(Netherlands) Vitesse
26 June 2017	(The Gambia) Ebou Adams	Norwich City	Shrewsbury Town
26 June 2017	(England) Jonathan Bond	Reading	Peterborough United
26 June 2017	(England) Josh Ginnelly	Burnley	Lincoln City
26 June 2017	(Latvia) Deniss Rakels	Reading	(Poland) Lech Poznań
27 June 2017	(Republic of Ireland) Jack Bonham	Brentford	Carlisle United
27 June 2017	(Belgium) Julien De Sart	Middlesbrough	(Belgium) Zulte Waregem
27 June 2017	(England) Jon Flatt	Wolverhampton Wanderers	Cheltenham Town
27 June 2017	(Scotland) Greg Stewart	Birmingham City	(Scotland) Aberdeen
28 June 2017	(England) Brad Ash	Barnsley	Boreham Wood
28 June 2017	(Austria) Konstantin Kerschbaumer	Brentford	(Germany) Arminia Bielefeld
29 June 2017	(England) Joe Fryer	Middlesbrough	Stevenage
29 June 2017	(Netherlands) Paul Gladon	Wolverhampton Wanderers	(Netherlands) Heracles
30 June 2017	(Italy) Fabio Borini	Sunderland	(Italy) Milan
30 June 2017	(Spain) Manu García	Manchester City	(Netherlands) NAC
30 June 2017	(Germany) Akaki Gogia	Brentford	(Germany) Dynamo Dresden
30 June 2017	(Wales) Daniel James	(Wales) Swansea City	Shrewsbury Town
30 June 2017	(Denmark) Jonas Lössl	(Germany) Mainz 05	Huddersfield Town
30 June 2017	(Nigeria) Henry Onyekuru	Everton	(Belgium) Anderlecht
30 June 2017	(Scotland) Andrew Shinnie	Birmingham City	Luton Town
30 June 2017	(England) Ashley Smith-Brown	Manchester City	(Scotland) Hearts
2 July 2017	(United States) Andrija Novakovich	Reading	(Netherlands) Telstar
3 July 2017	(Kosovo) Bersant Celina	Manchester City	Ipswich Town
3 July 2017	(England) Jonathan Edwards	Hull City	Accrington Stanley
3 July 2017	(England) Luke Murphy	Leeds United	Burton Albion
3 July 2017	(England) Robbie Tinkler	Middlesbrough	Gateshead
3 July 2017	(China) Zhang Yuning	West Bromwich Albion	(Germany) Werder Bremen
4 July 2017	(England) Tammy Abraham	Chelsea	(Wales) Swansea City
4 July 2017	(Spain) Angeliño	Manchester City	(Netherlands) NAC
4 July 2017	(Spain) Borja	(Wales) Swansea City	(Spain) Málaga
4 July 2017	(England) Lewie Coyle	Leeds United	Fleetwood Town
4 July 2017	(Netherlands) Danzell Gravenberch	Reading	(Belgium) Roeselare
4 July 2017	(England) George Long	Sheffield United	Wimbledon
4 July 2017	(England) Ntumba Massanka	Burnley	(Wales) Wrexham
4 July 2017	(England) Kasey Palmer	Chelsea	Huddersfield Town
5 July 2017	(Republic of Ireland) James Dunne	Burnley	Barrow
5 July 2017	(England) Brendan Galloway	Everton	Sunderland
5 July 2017	(England) Jordy Hiwula	Huddersfield Town	Fleetwood Town
5 July 2017	(England) Tareiq Holmes-Dennis	Huddersfield Town	Portsmouth
5 July 2017	(England) Bradley Jackson	Burnley	Southport
5 July 2017	(England) Todd Kane	Chelsea	(Netherlands) Groningen
5 July 2017	(Ecuador) Josimar Quintero	Chelsea	(Russia) Rostov
5 July 2017	(England) Harrison Reed	Southampton	Norwich City
6 July 2017	(Spain) Antonio Barragán	Middlesbrough	(Spain) Real Betis
6 July 2017	(England) Charlie Colkett	Chelsea	(Netherlands) Vitesse
6 July 2017	(Northern Ireland) Joe Crowe	Norwich City	(Republic of Ireland) Limerick
6 July 2017	(England) Fraser Horsfall	Huddersfield Town	Gateshead
6 July 2017	(England) Dennon Lewis	Norwich City	Crawley Town
7 July 2017	(Spain) Jordi Amat	(Wales) Swansea City	(Spain) Real Betis
7 July 2017	(England) Bradley Collins	Chelsea	Forest Green Rovers
7 July 2017	(Germany) Anton Donkor	(Germany) VfL Wolfsburg	Everton
7 July 2017	(England) Matthew Elsdon	Middlesbrough	(Scotland) Inverness Caledonian Thistle
7 July 2017	(England) Alex Gilliead	Newcastle United	Bradford City
7 July 2017	(England) Harry Girling	Millwall	Leatherhead
7 July 2017	(England) Chris Hussey	Sheffield United	Swindon Town
7 July 2017	(England) Connor Ogilvie	Tottenham Hotspur	Gillingham
7 July 2017	(Wales) Regan Poole	Manchester United	Northampton Town
7 July 2017	(Republic of Ireland) Mark Travers	Bournemouth	Weymouth
8 July 2017	(France) Willy Boly	(Portugal) Porto	Wolverhampton Wanderers
8 July 2017	(England) Tyias Browning	Everton	Sunderland
8 July 2017	(Ivory Coast) Yakou Méïte	Reading	(France) Sochaux
9 July 2017	(England) Olufela Olomola	Southampton	Yeovil Town
10 July 2017	(Romania) Nicolae Cârnaț	Wolverhampton Wanderers	(Denmark) Esbjerg
10 July 2017	(England) Tom Heardman	Newcastle United	Bury
10 July 2017	(England) Dean Henderson	Manchester United	Shrewsbury Town
10 July 2017	(England) Jordan Maguire-Drew	Brighton & Hove Albion	Lincoln City
10 July 2017	(England) Kieffer Moore	Ipswich Town	Rotherham United
10 July 2017	(Nigeria) Chidiebere Nwakali	Manchester City	(Norway) Sogndal
11 July 2017	(Nigeria) Ola Aina	Chelsea	Hull City
11 July 2017	(England) Carlton Morris	Norwich City	Shrewsbury Town
11 July 2017	(England) Rekeil Pyke	Huddersfield Town	Port Vale
11 July 2017	(England) Louis Reed	Sheffield United	Chesterfield
12 July 2017	(Spain) Carles Gil	Aston Villa	(Spain) Deportivo La Coruña
12 July 2017	(England) Ruben Loftus-Cheek	Chelsea	Crystal Palace
12 July 2017	(England) Harry Smith	Millwall	Swindon Town
12 July 2017	(England) Christian Walton	Brighton & Hove Albion	Wigan Athletic
13 July 2017	(England) Josh Emmanuel	Ipswich Town	Rotherham United
14 July 2017	(England) Marc Bola	Arsenal	Bristol Rovers
14 July 2017	(Wales) Keston Davies	(Wales) Swansea City	Yeovil Town
14 July 2017	(England) Ethan Ebanks-Landell	Wolverhampton Wanderers	Milton Keynes Dons
14 July 2017	(England) Dominic Iorfa	Wolverhampton Wanderers	Ipswich Town
14 July 2017	(England) Sam Johnstone	Manchester United	Aston Villa
14 July 2017	(Poland) Bartosz Kapustka	Leicester City	(Germany) SC Freiburg
14 July 2017	(England) Harry Lewis	Southampton	(Scotland) Dundee United
14 July 2017	(Brazil) Lucas Piazon	Chelsea	Fulham
14 July 2017	(Wales) Connor Roberts	(Wales) Swansea City	Middlesbrough
15 July 2017	(Comoros) Jimmy Abdou	Millwall	Wimbledon
16 July 2017	(Netherlands) Marco van Ginkel	Chelsea	(Netherlands) PSV
17 July 2017	(United States) Gboly Ariyibi	Nottingham Forest	Milton Keynes Dons
17 July 2017	(England) Adam Armstrong	Newcastle United	Bolton Wanderers
17 July 2017	(Egypt) Ahmed Hegazy	(Egypt) Al Ahly	West Bromwich Albion
17 July 2017	(England) Ike Ugbo	Chelsea	Barnsley
17 July 2017	(Wales) James Wilson	Sheffield United	Walsall
18 July 2017	(England) Ryan Allsop	Bournemouth	Blackpool
18 July 2017	(England) Callum Cooke	Middlesbrough	Blackpool
18 July 2017	(England) Marcus Harness	Burton Albion	Port Vale
18 July 2017	(England) Joe Hart	Manchester City	West Ham United
19 July 2017	(England) Matthew Pennington	Everton	Leeds United
20 July 2017	(England) Jorge Grant	Nottingham Forest	Notts County
20 July 2017	(Portugal) Rúben Vinagre	(France) Monaco	Wolverhampton Wanderers
20 July 2017	(England) Joe Williams	Everton	Barnsley
21 July 2017	(Ghana) Thomas Agyepong	Manchester City	(Netherlands) NAC
21 July 2017	(England) Jay Dasilva	Chelsea	Charlton Athletic
21 July 2017	(England) Sean Longstaff	Newcastle United	Blackpool
21 July 2017	(England) Ryan Seager	Southampton	Milton Keynes Dons
21 July 2017	(France) Kurt Zouma	Chelsea	Stoke City
22 July 2017	(England) Jack Fitzwater	West Bromwich Albion	Forest Green Rovers
22 July 2017	(England) Mason Mount	Chelsea	(Netherlands) Vitesse
24 July 2017	(England) Jordan Lee	Bournemouth	Torquay United
25 July 2017	(England) Izzy Brown	Chelsea	Brighton & Hove Albion
25 July 2017	(Australia) Tom Glover	Tottenham Hotspur	(Australia) Central Coast Mariners
25 July 2017	(Portugal) Diogo Jota	(Spain) Atlético Madrid	Wolverhampton Wanderers
25 July 2017	(Northern Ireland) Oliver Norwood	Brighton & Hove Albion	Fulham
25 July 2017	(England) Louis Ramsay	Norwich City	Woking
26 July 2017	(Spain) Pedro Chirivella	Liverpool	(Netherlands) Willem II
26 July 2017	(Republic of Ireland) Dan Cleary	Birmingham City	Solihull Moors
26 July 2017	(England) Niall Ennis	Wolverhampton Wanderers	Shrewsbury Town
26 July 2017	(Jamaica) Lewis Grabban	Bournemouth	Sunderland
26 July 2017	(Nigeria) Viv Solomon-Otabor	Birmingham City	Blackpool
26 July 2017	(England) Connal Trueman	Birmingham City	Solihull Moors
27 July 2017	(England) Jamal Blackman	Chelsea	Sheffield United
27 July 2017	(Italy) Diego Fabbrini	Birmingham City	(Spain) Real Oviedo
27 July 2017	(Jamaica) Michael Hector	Chelsea	Hull City
27 July 2017	(Czech Republic) Tomáš Kalas	Chelsea	Fulham
27 July 2017	(Belgium) Obbi Oularé	Watford	(Belgium) Royal Antwerp
27 July 2017	(England) Aaron Tshibola	Aston Villa	Milton Keynes Dons
28 July 2017	(England) Jake Andrews	Bristol City	Chippenham Town
28 July 2017	(England) Aden Baldwin	Bristol City	Weston-super-Mare
28 July 2017	(England) Ashley Harper	Bristol City	Weston-super-Mare
28 July 2017	(Wales) Connor Lemonheigh-Evans	Bristol City	Bath City
28 July 2017	(England) Chris Long	Burnley	Northampton Town
28 July 2017	(Spain) Mikel Merino	(Germany) Borussia Dortmund	Newcastle United
28 July 2017	(United States) Matt Miazga	Chelsea	(Netherlands) Vitesse
28 July 2017	(England) Shawn McCoulsky	Bristol City	(Wales) Newport County
28 July 2017	(England) Jack Payne	Huddersfield Town	Oxford United
28 July 2017	(England) Connor Randall	Liverpool	(Scotland) Hearts
28 July 2017	(England) Devonte Redmond	Manchester United	Scunthorpe United
28 July 2017	(England) Jared Thompson	Chelsea	Chippenham Town
29 July 2017	(England) Ben Amos	Bolton Wanderers	Charlton Athletic
29 July 2017	(Ivory Coast) Victorien Angban	Chelsea	(Belgium) Waasland-Beveren
31 July 2017	(England) Tristan Abrahams	Norwich City	Leyton Orient
31 July 2017	(Nigeria) Taiwo Awoniyi	Liverpool	(Belgium) Royal Excel Mouscron
31 July 2017	(Kenya) Jonah Ayunga	Brighton & Hove Albion	(Republic of Ireland) Galway United
31 July 2017	(Australia) Callum Elder	Leicester City	Wigan Athletic
31 July 2017	(Wales) Lee Evans	Wolverhampton Wanderers	Wigan Athletic
31 July 2017	(Scotland) Alex Iacovitti	Nottingham Forest	Forest Green Rovers
31 July 2017	(England) Alex Whitmore	Burnley	Bury
31 July 2017	(England) Jack Williams	Queens Park Rangers	Wycombe Wanderers
1 August 2017	(Brazil) Léo Bonatini	(Saudi Arabia) Al-Hilal	Wolverhampton Wanderers
1 August 2017	(England) Reece Burke	West Ham United	Bolton Wanderers
1 August 2017	(Republic of Ireland) Josh Cullen	West Ham United	Bolton Wanderers
1 August 2017	(England) Robert Dickie	Reading	Lincoln City
1 August 2017	(Spain) Aleix García	Manchester City	(Spain) Girona
1 August 2017	(England) Shamal George	Liverpool	Carlisle United
1 August 2017	(England) Aaron Hayden	Wolverhampton Wanderers	Telford United
1 August 2017	(Brazil) Douglas Luiz	Manchester City	(Spain) Girona
1 August 2017	(Spain) Pablo Maffeo	Manchester City	(Spain) Girona
1 August 2017	(Colombia) Marlos Moreno	Manchester City	(Spain) Girona
1 August 2017	(Australia) Aiden O'Neill	Burnley	Fleetwood Town
1 August 2017	(England) Lewis Ward	Reading	Hungerford Town
1 August 2017	(England) Ben White	Brighton & Hove Albion	(Wales) Newport County
2 August 2017	(Netherlands) Ouasim Bouy	Leeds United	(Spain) Cultural Leonesa
2 August 2017	(Australia) Anthony Cáceres	Manchester City	(United Arab Emirates) Al-Wasl
2 August 2017	(Argentina) Emiliano Martínez	Arsenal	(Spain) Getafe
2 August 2017	(Croatia) Mario Pašalić	Chelsea	(Russia) Spartak Moscow
2 August 2017	(England) Ivan Toney	Newcastle United	Wigan Athletic
3 August 2017	(England) Isaac Buckley-Ricketts	Manchester City	(Netherlands) Twente
3 August 2017	(England) Kieran Dowell	Everton	Nottingham Forest
3 August 2017	(England) Alex Finney	Queens Park Rangers	Maidstone United
3 August 2017	(Netherlands) Rodney Kongolo	Manchester City	Doncaster Rovers
3 August 2017	(England) Jamie Philpot	Millwall	Woking
3 August 2017	(Iceland) Ragnar Sigurðsson	Fulham	(Russia) Rubin Kazan
3 August 2017	(England) Aaron Simpson	Wolverhampton Wanderers	Telford United
3 August 2017	(England) Sam Surridge	Bournemouth	Yeovil Town
4 August 2017	(England) Harry Chapman	Middlesbrough	Blackburn Rovers
4 August 2017	(England) Tom Dallison	Brighton & Hove Albion	Accrington Stanley
4 August 2017	(England) Tyler Hornby-Forbes	Brighton & Hove Albion	Accrington Stanley
4 August 2017	(England) Stephy Mavididi	Arsenal	Preston North End
4 August 2017	(Haiti) Duckens Nazon	Wolverhampton Wanderers	Coventry City
4 August 2017	(England) Josh Onomah	Tottenham Hotspur	Aston Villa
4 August 2017	(United States) Antonee Robinson	Everton	Bolton Wanderers
4 August 2017	(England) Luke Southwood	Bristol City	Bath City
4 August 2017	(Republic of Ireland) Ryan Sweeney	Stoke City	Bristol Rovers
4 August 2017	(England) Dom Telford	Stoke City	Bristol Rovers
4 August 2017	(England) Ben Whitfield	Bournemouth	Port Vale
4 August 2017	(England) Ben Wilson	(Wales) Cardiff City	Oldham Athletic
4 August 2017	(England) Ryan Yates	Nottingham Forest	Notts County
6 August 2017	(Netherlands) Jeremain Lens	Sunderland	(Turkey) Beşiktaş
7 August 2017	(England) Cameron Borthwick-Jackson	Manchester United	Leeds United
7 August 2017	(England) Tyler Denton	Leeds United	Port Vale
7 August 2017	(Republic of Ireland) Tom Field	Brentford	Bradford City
7 August 2017	(England) Connor Ripley	Middlesbrough	Burton Albion
8 August 2017	(Mexico) Uriel Antuna	Manchester City	(Netherlands) Groningen
8 August 2017	(England) Sam Matthews	Bournemouth	Eastleigh
8 August 2017	(Northern Ireland) Conor Mitchell	Burnley	Chester
8 August 2017	(England) Callum Williams	Newcastle United	Gateshead
9 August 2017	(England) Diallang Jaiyesimi	Norwich City	Grimsby Town
10 August 2017	(France) Jordan Amavi	Aston Villa	(France) Marseille
10 August 2017	(England) Reece Cole	Brentford	(Wales) Newport County
10 August 2017	(Sweden) Gustav Engvall	Bristol City	(Sweden) Djurgårdens IF
10 August 2017	(Netherlands) Timothy Fosu-Mensah	Manchester United	Crystal Palace
11 August 2017	(Sweden) Marcus Antonsson	Leeds United	Blackburn Rovers
11 August 2017	(England) Lewis Baker	Chelsea	Middlesbrough
11 August 2017	(England) Harvey Barnes	Leicester City	Barnsley
11 August 2017	(Republic of Ireland) Shaun Donnellan	West Bromwich Albion	Walsall
11 August 2017	(Democratic Republic of the Congo) Kazenga LuaLua	Brighton & Hove Albion	Queens Park Rangers
11 August 2017	(Spain) Marc Muniesa	Stoke City	(Spain) Girona
12 August 2017	(England) Kyle Howkins	West Bromwich Albion	Cambridge United
16 August 2017	(Spain) Jesé	(France) Paris Saint-Germain	Stoke City
16 August 2017	(England) Sheyi Ojo	Liverpool	Fulham
16 August 2017	(Portugal) Frederico Venâncio	(Portugal) Vitória Setubal	Sheffield Wednesday
17 August 2017	(England) Brandon Barker	Manchester City	(Scotland) Hibernian
17 August 2017	(England) Baily Cargill	Bournemouth	Fleetwood Town
17 August 2017	(Ivory Coast) Max Gradel	Bournemouth	(France) Toulouse
17 August 2017	(England) Jack Stobbs	Sheffield Wednesday	Port Vale
17 August 2017	(England) Cauley Woodrow	Fulham	Bristol City
18 August 2017	(England) Matt Grimes	(Wales) Swansea City	Northampton Town
18 August 2017	(Nigeria) Olarenwaju Kayode	Manchester City	(Spain) Girona
18 August 2017	(England) Sean Raggett	Norwich City	Lincoln City
18 August 2017	(Republic of Ireland) Sean Scannell	Huddersfield Town	Burton Albion
21 August 2017	(England) Cohen Bramall	Arsenal	Birmingham City
21 August 2017	(England) Sam Gallagher	Southampton	Birmingham City
21 August 2017	(England) Luke Hendrie	Burnley	Bradford City
21 August 2017	(England) Carl Jenkinson	Arsenal	Birmingham City
21 August 2017	(England) Sid Nelson	Millwall	Yeovil Town
22 August 2017	(Portugal) Rafa	(Portugal) Porto	Fulham
23 August 2017	(Republic of Ireland) Joe Mason	Wolverhampton Wanderers	Burton Albion
24 August 2017	(England) Ben Godfrey	Norwich City	Shrewsbury Town
24 August 2017	(Switzerland) Florent Hadergjonaj	(Germany) Ingolstadt 04	Huddersfield Town
24 August 2017	(Republic of Ireland) Kevin Toner	Aston Villa	Stevenage
24 August 2017	(England) Mallik Wilks	Leeds United	Accrington Stanley
25 August 2017	(England) James Brown	Millwall	Carlisle United
25 August 2017	(United States) Cameron Carter-Vickers	Tottenham Hotspur	Sheffield United
25 August 2017	(England) Rohan Ince	Brighton & Hove Albion	Bury
25 August 2017	(Wales) Tyler Roberts	West Bromwich Albion	Walsall
25 August 2017	(Scotland) Robert Snodgrass	West Ham United	Aston Villa
25 August 2017	(England) Jordan Williams	Huddersfield Town	Bury
25 August 2017	(England) Ibrahim Meite	Cardiff City	Crawley Town
28 August 2017	(Ivory Coast) Jérémie Boga	Chelsea	Birmingham City
28 August 2017	(England) Jonathan Leko	West Bromwich Albion	Bristol City
28 August 2017	(England) Patrick Roberts	Manchester City	(Scotland) Celtic
29 August 2017	(England) Will Randall	Wolverhampton Wanderers	Forest Green Rovers
29 August 2017	(England) Jordan Thorniley	Sheffield Wednesday	Accrington Stanley
30 August 2017	(Netherlands) Jordy Clasie	Southampton	(Belgium) Club Brugge
30 August 2017	(Italy) Diego De Girolamo	Bristol City	Chesterfield
30 August 2017	(Romania) Alex Dobre	Bournemouth	Bury
30 August 2017	(England) Eberechi Eze	Queens Park Rangers	Wycombe Wanderers
30 August 2017	(England) Conor Grant	Everton	Crewe Alexandra
30 August 2017	(England) Freddie Hinds	Bristol City	Cheltenham Town
30 August 2017	(Poland) Grzegorz Krychowiak	(France) Paris Saint-Germain	West Bromwich Albion
30 August 2017	(Finland) Thomas Lam	Nottingham Forest	(Netherlands) Twente
30 August 2017	(England) Michael Ledger	Sunderland	Hartlepool United
30 August 2017	(England) Taylor Moore	Bristol City	Cheltenham Town
30 August 2017	(Wales) Joe Morrell	Bristol City	Cheltenham Town
30 August 2017	(Slovakia) Marek Rodák	Fulham	Rotherham United
30 August 2017	(Republic of Ireland) Adam McDonnell	Ipswich Town	Aldershot Town
30 August 2017	(England) George Fowler	Ipswich Town	Aldershot Town
31 August 2017	(England) Dan Agyei	Burnley	Walsall
31 August 2017	(Brazil) Allan	Liverpool	(Cyprus) Apollon Limassol
31 August 2017	(England) Keshi Anderson	Crystal Palace	Swindon Town
31 August 2017	(England) Tom Anderson	Burnley	Port Vale
31 August 2017	(England) Kean Bryan	Manchester City	Oldham Athletic
31 August 2017	(Scotland) Craig Bryson	Derby County	(Wales) Cardiff City
31 August 2017	(England) Jacob Butterfield	Derby County	Sheffield Wednesday
31 August 2017	(Costa Rica) Joel Campbell	Arsenal	(Spain) Real Betis
31 August 2017	(England) Sean Clare	Sheffield Wednesday	Gillingham
31 August 2017	(Montserrat) Brandon Comley	Queens Park Rangers	Colchester United
31 August 2017	(England) Callum Connolly	Everton	Ipswich Town
31 August 2017	(Belgium) Jason Denayer	Manchester City	(Turkey) Galatasaray
31 August 2017	(Senegal) Papy Djilobodji	Sunderland	(France) Dijon
31 August 2017	(England) Paul Downing	Milton Keynes Dons	Blackburn Rovers
31 August 2017	(Republic of Ireland) Eoin Doyle	Preston North End	Oldham Athletic
31 August 2017	(Austria) Aleksandar Dragović	(Germany) Bayer Leverkusen	Leicester City
31 August 2017	(England) Kyle Edwards	West Bromwich Albion	Exeter City
31 August 2017	(Slovenia) Timi Elšnik	Derby County	Swindon Town
31 August 2017	(Australia) Adam Federici	Bournemouth	Nottingham Forest
31 August 2017	(England) Liam Feeney	Blackburn Rovers	(Wales) Cardiff City
31 August 2017	(England) Gary Gardner	Aston Villa	Barnsley
31 August 2017	(Portugal) Toni Gomes	Liverpool	Forest Green Rovers
31 August 2017	(England) Kellan Gordon	Derby County	Swindon Town
31 August 2017	(England) Jordan Graham	Wolverhampton Wanderers	Fulham
31 August 2017	(England) Rekeem Harper	West Bromwich Albion	Blackburn Rovers
31 August 2017	(England) Jordan Houghton	Chelsea	Doncaster Rovers
31 August 2017	(France) Giannelli Imbula	Stoke City	(France) Toulouse
31 August 2017	(England) Matt Ingram	Queens Park Rangers	Northampton Town
31 August 2017	(England) Ryan Inniss	Crystal Palace	Colchester United
31 August 2017	(Wales) Declan John	(Wales) Cardiff City	(Scotland) Rangers
31 August 2017	(England) Callum Johnson	Middlesbrough	Accrington Stanley
31 August 2017	(France) Cheick Keita	Birmingham City	(Italy) Bologna
31 August 2017	(Scotland) Matty Kennedy	(Wales) Cardiff City	Portsmouth
31 August 2017	(England) Ryan Kent	Liverpool	(Germany) SC Freiburg
31 August 2017	(Tunisia) Wahbi Khazri	Sunderland	(France) Rennes
31 August 2017	(Spain) Bojan Krkić	Stoke City	(Spain) Alavés
31 August 2017	(Netherlands) Tim Krul	Newcastle United	Brighton & Hove Albion
31 August 2017	(Germany) Pierre-Michel Lasogga	(Germany) Hamburger SV	Leeds United
31 August 2017	(Scotland) Oli McBurnie	(Wales) Swansea City	Barnsley
31 August 2017	(Republic of Ireland) Damien McCrory	Burton Albion	Portsmouth
31 August 2017	(France) Nampalys Mendy	Leicester City	(France) Nice
31 August 2017	(England) Alex Mowatt	Barnsley	Oxford United
31 August 2017	(Brazil) Nathan	Chelsea	(France) Amiens
31 August 2017	(Senegal) Alfred N'Diaye	(Spain) Villarreal	Wolverhampton Wanderers
31 August 2017	(Nigeria) Kelechi Nwakali	Arsenal	(Netherlands) VVV-Venlo
31 August 2017	(England) Stuart O'Keefe	(Wales) Cardiff City	Portsmouth
31 August 2017	(Belgium) Divock Origi	Liverpool	(Germany) VfL Wolfsburg
31 August 2017	(Spain) Lucas Pérez	Arsenal	(Spain) Deportivo La Coruña
31 August 2017	(England) Farrend Rawson	Derby County	Accrington Stanley
31 August 2017	(Scotland) Jack Ruddy	Wolverhampton Wanderers	Oldham Athletic
31 August 2017	(Portugal) Renato Sanches	(Germany) Bayern Munich	(Wales) Swansea City
31 August 2017	(Montenegro) Matija Sarkic	Aston Villa	Wigan Athletic
31 August 2017	(England) Dan Scarr	Birmingham City	Wycombe Wanderers
31 August 2017	(Poland) Max Stryjek	Sunderland	Accrington Stanley
31 August 2017	(Germany) Robert Tesche	Birmingham City	(Germany) VfL Bochum
31 August 2017	(England) Harry Toffolo	Norwich City	Doncaster Rovers
31 August 2017	(England) Fikayo Tomori	Chelsea	Hull City
31 August 2017	(Republic of Ireland) Richie Towell	Brighton & Hove Albion	Rotherham United
31 August 2017	(Mali) Molla Wagué	(Italy) Udinese	Watford
31 August 2017	(Wales) Jonny Williams	Crystal Palace	Sunderland
31 August 2017	(Wales) Jordan Williams	Liverpool	Rochdale
31 August 2017	(England) Matty Willock	Manchester United	(Netherlands) Utrecht
31 August 2017	(England) Kane Wilson	West Bromwich Albion	Exeter City
31 August 2017	(England) Sam Winnall	Sheffield Wednesday	Derby County
31 August 2017	(England) Matt Worthington	Bournemouth	Yeovil Town
31 August 2017	(England) Scott Golbourne	Bristol City	Milton Keynes Dons
1 September 2017	(Morocco) Nordin Amrabat	Watford	(Spain) Leganés
1 September 2017	(Ecuador) Jefferson Montero	(Wales) Swansea City	(Spain) Getafe
1 September 2017	(Romania) Costel Pantilimon	Watford	(Spain) Deportivo La Coruña
1 September 2017	(England) Liam Walsh	Everton	Birmingham City
2 September 2017	(Brazil) Andreas Pereira	Manchester United	(Spain) Valencia

=== Unattached Players ===
Date	Name	New Club
16 February 2017	(Uruguay) Martín Cáceres	Southampton
7 March 2017	(Norway) Vegard Forren	Brighton & Hove Albion
19 May 2017^{[b]}	(Northern Ireland) Matty Lund	Burton Albion
22 May 2017^{[b]}	(Republic of Ireland) Enda Stevens	Sheffield United
24 May 2017	(England) Luke Daniels	Brentford
25 May 2017^{[b]}	(England) Andrew Taylor	Bolton Wanderers
25 May 2017^{[b]}	(England) Frankie Vincent	Bournemouth
26 May 2017^{[b]}	(England) Luke Armstrong	Middlesbrough
26 May 2017	(Northern Ireland) Charlie Owens	Queens Park Rangers
26 May 2017^{[b]}	(Argentina) Pablo Zabaleta	West Ham United
29 May 2017^{[b]}	(Australia) James Meredith	Millwall
30 May 2017^{[b]}	(Philippines) Neil Etheridge	(Wales) Cardiff City
30 May 2017	(England) Nathaniel Mendez-Laing	(Wales) Cardiff City
31 May 2017^{[b]}	(England) Ryan Bennett	Wolverhampton Wanderers
1 June 2017^{[b]}	(Scotland) Darren Fletcher	Stoke City
1 June 2017^{[b]}	(Wales) Marley Watkins	Norwich City
6 June 2017^{[b]}	(Bosnia and Herzegovina) Sead Kolašinac	Arsenal
6 June 2017^{[b]}	(England) Adam Le Fondre	Bolton Wanderers
7 June 2017^{[b]}	(Scotland) Callum Paterson	(Wales) Cardiff City
9 June 2017^{[b]}	(England) Tom Elliott	Millwall
13 June 2017^{[b]}	(England) David Stockdale	Birmingham City
15 June 2017^{[b]}	(Germany) Christoph Zimmermann	Norwich City
16 June 2017^{[b]}	(Northern Ireland) Lee Camp	(Wales) Cardiff City
16 June 2017	(England) Mark Little	Bolton Wanderers
19 June 2017	(Wales) Ben Williams	Barnsley
20 June 2017	(Ghana) Phil Ofosu-Ayeh	Wolverhampton Wanderers
20 June 2017	(United States) Giles Phillips	Queens Park Rangers
22 June 2017	(Finland) Marcus Forss	Brentford
26 June 2017	(England) Stephen Warnock	Burton Albion
27 June 2017	(Spain) Madger Gomes	Leeds United
27 June 2017^{[b]}	(Italy) Eros Pisano	Bristol City
28 June 2017	(England) Tom Brewitt	Middlesbrough
28 June 2017	(England) Jake Buxton	Burton Albion
28 June 2017	(England) Lewis Wing	Middlesbrough
29 June 2017^{[b]}	(Netherlands) Erwin Mulder	(Wales) Swansea City
30 June 2017^{[b]}	(England) Tom Adeyemi	Ipswich Town
30 June 2017	(England) Will Buckley	Bolton Wanderers
30 June 2017	(Wales) Liam Edwards	Hull City
1 July 2017	(Austria) Daniel Bachmann	Watford
1 July 2017	(Argentina) Willy Caballero	Chelsea
1 July 2017	(Spain) Kiko Femenía	Watford
1 July 2017	(England) Zeki Fryers	Barnsley
1 July 2017	(England) Josh Scowen	Queens Park Rangers
2 July 2017	(Wales) Lloyd Isgrove	Barnsley
3 July 2017	(Scotland) George Boyd	Sheffield Wednesday
3 July 2017	(England) John Terry	Aston Villa
4 July 2017	(United States) Danny Williams	Huddersfield Town
5 July 2017	(France) Boris Mathis	Everton
5 July 2017	(Northern Ireland) Conor McLaughlin	Millwall
5 July 2017	(England) Rahis Nabi	Burnley
5 July 2017	(England) Christian N'Guessan	Burnley
5 July 2017	(England) Aiden Stone	Burnley
6 July 2017	(Netherlands) Vurnon Anita	Leeds United
6 July 2017	(France) Loïc Damour	(Wales) Cardiff City
6 July 2017	(England) Stefan O'Connor	Newcastle United
6 July 2017	(England) Josef Yarney	Newcastle United
7 July 2017	(England) Joe Coveney	Nottingham Forest
7 July 2017	(England) Stephen Darby	Bolton Wanderers
8 July 2017	(England) Harvey Bradbury	Watford
8 July 2017	(England) Sam Howes	Watford
10 July 2017	(England) Ben Pierce	West Bromwich Albion
10 July 2017	(England) John Ruddy	Wolverhampton Wanderers
12 July 2017	(Republic of Ireland) Liam Bossin	Nottingham Forest
12 July 2017	(England) Chay Tilt	Queens Park Rangers
14 July 2017	(England) Sammy Ameobi	Bolton Wanderers
14 July 2017	(Senegal) Cheikh N'Doye	Birmingham City
17 July 2017	(Curaçao) Cuco Martina	Everton
18 July 2017	(Nigeria) Hope Akpan	Burton Albion
18 July 2017	(England) Fraizer Campbell	Hull City
18 July 2017	(Portugal) Pedro Gonçalves	Wolverhampton Wanderers
18 July 2017	(Portugal) Boubacar Hanne	Wolverhampton Wanderers
20 July 2017	(Republic of the Congo) Christopher Samba	Aston Villa
28 July 2017	(England) Adam Phillips	Norwich City
29 July 2017	(England) Ryan Tunnicliffe	Millwall
2 August 2017	(Netherlands) Robbin Ruiter	Sunderland
4 August 2017	(Germany) Tom Trybull	Norwich City
7 August 2017	(England) Alex Baptiste	Queens Park Rangers
7 August 2017	(Cameroon) Eric Maxim Choupo-Moting	Stoke City
9 August 2017	(Sweden) Sebastian Larsson	Hull City
24 August 2017	(Sweden) Zlatan Ibrahimović	Manchester United
27 August 2017	(England) Robert Green	Huddersfield Town

^{a} Player officially joined his club on 10 June 2017.
^{b} Player officially joined his club on 1 July 2017.
^{c} Player officially joined his club on 3 July 2017.
^{d} Player will officially join his club on 24 July 2017.
