= 2017–18 Yeovil Town F.C. season =

Yeovil Town
2017–18 season
- Chairman: John Fry
- Manager: Darren Way
- Stadium: Huish Park
- League Two: 19th
- FA Cup: Fourth round
- EFL Cup: First round
- EFL Trophy: Semi-final
- Top goalscorer: League: François Zoko (13); All: François Zoko (15)
- Highest home attendance: 9,195 (26 January vs. Manchester United, FA Cup)
- Lowest home attendance: 886 (5 December vs. AFC Wimbledon, EFL Trophy)
- Average home league attendance: 2,941
Home colours	Away colours

The 2017–18 season was the 15th season in the Football League and the 3rd consecutive season at the fourth tier of English football played by Yeovil Town Football Club, an English football club based in Yeovil, Somerset.

Manager Darren Way was starting his second full season in charge, the club signed thirteen players on permanent and loan contracts before the close of the summer transfer window, although one was released without having made an appearance. After losing their opening game by a record 8–2 scoreline away at Luton Town. The club's league season had few highpoints as they spent all but one week of the season in the lower half of the table, the Glovers did record their record away victory in the Football League in April with a 6–2 win at Coventry City. Despite indifferent form safety was confirmed with two matches to spare as Yeovil finished the season in 19th place.

In cup competitions Yeovil had more success reaching the fourth round of the FA Cup for only the fourth time in their history, beating two League One sides to get there, before losing at home to eventual runners-up Manchester United. In the EFL Cup the Glovers lost in the first round against Championship side Wolverhampton Wanderers, while in the EFL Trophy the club reached the semi-finals, losing to Shrewsbury Town having beaten three League One sides to reach that stage. Ivorian striker François Zoko finished as the club's top goalscorer for the third consecutive season with fifteen goals, thirteen of which he scored in the league.

== Background ==
The 2016–17 season was the club's second consecutive in the fourth tier of the English football league system, it was Darren Way's first full season in charge as manager. After winning their opening game, Yeovil lost six of their next seven matches leaving them in the relegation zone in September before an improved run of form, including eight matches unbeaten saw the club rise into the play-offs after a 5–0 victory against Crawley Town in December 2016. This though was the highpoint of the season as Yeovil only won three of their final 27 matches as the club slid dangerously towards the relegation zone, but safety was confirmed with one match to spare as Yeovil finished the season in 20th place. In cup competitions, Yeovil were knocked out in the first round of the FA Cup, losing to non-league side Solihull Moors in a replay, while the Glovers progressed to the second round of the EFL Cup losing to Premier League side Everton. The club also reached the quarter-finals of the revamped EFL Trophy, losing to Luton Town.

The end of the season saw Way release six players, including, Ollie Bassett, Tom Eaves, Brandon Goodship, Alex Lawless, Joe Lea and captain Darren Ward. Nine players were offered new contracts by Darren Way, defender Nathan Smith agreed a new one-year contract, while forward François Zoko, winger Otis Khan, defenders Bevis Mugabi, Tom James and keeper Jonny Maddison also agreed new two-year contracts. Midfielder Kevin Dawson rejected the offer of a new contract to sign for fellow League Two side Cheltenham Town and reunite with former manager Gary Johnson. Defender Alex Lacey rejected the club's offer of a new two-year contract and signed for League One side Gillingham. Meanwhile, midfielder Matthew Dolan rejected the club's offer to sign for fellow League Two side Newport County.

== Review ==
=== Pre-season ===
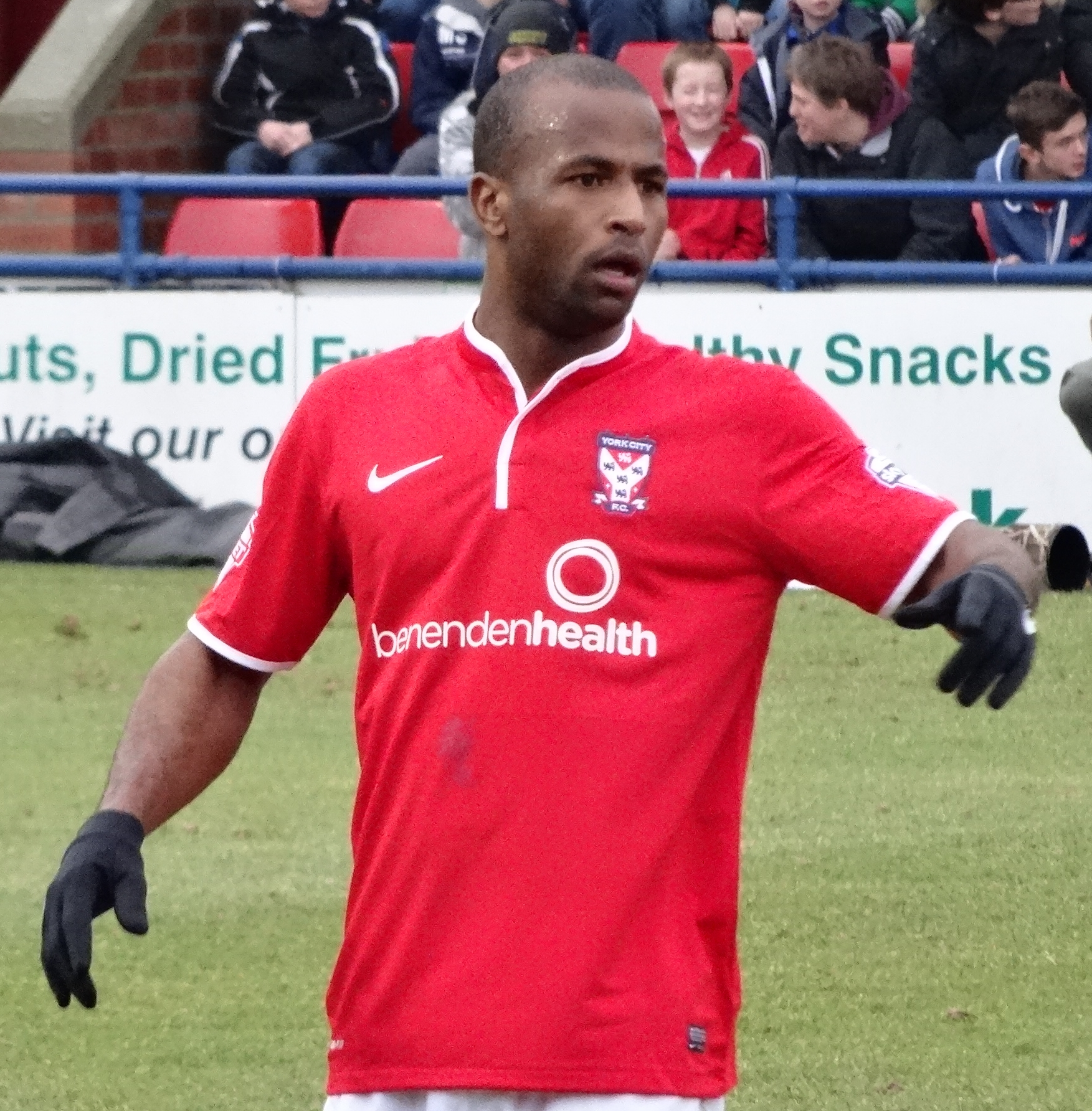
Guadaloupean international Stéphane Zubar joined from rivals Weymouth, but was later released without having made an appearance.

The first day of pre-season saw the arrival of four new signings, winger Rhys Browne, son of ex-Glover Steve Browne, joined from Grimsby Town for an undisclosed fee signing a two-year contract, midfielder Jake Gray also signed a two-year contract for an undisclosed fee from Luton Town. Meanwhile, Connor Smith joined following his release from Plymouth Argyle, and Guadeloupean international defender Stéphane Zubar signed a one-year contract after rejecting an offer of a new contract at local rivals Weymouth. On 4 July, Yeovil confirmed their fifth signing of pre-season with midfielder James Bailey signing a two-year contract after leaving Carlisle United, prior to Yeovil's first friendly of pre-season, the club confirmed the signing of Southampton striker Olufela Olomola on loan until January 2018.

Yeovil's first friendly of the season saw them travel to local rivals, Southern League Premier side Weymouth, on 11 July. Yeovil's squad included nine trialists, goals from Otis Khan and Bevis Mugabi earned the Glovers a 2–1 victory after former Yeovil striker Brandon Goodship had given Weymouth the lead. On 14 July, Yeovil completed their seventh signing of the season with young defender Keston Davies joining on loan until the end of the season from Swansea City. Davies made his first appearance the following day in Yeovil's first home friendly against Championship club Bristol City, on 15 July. Three goals in six first half minutes saw Yeovil succumb to a 3–1 defeat with Olomola scoring a consolation goal. Yeovil then traveled to South Wales for a short training camp, where on 19 July they faced Welsh Football League Division One club Llanelli Town, and recorded a 2–0 victory over their Welsh opponents with goals from Khan and François Zoko. On 22 July, Yeovil faced local side Frome Town in a friendly organised as a benefit match for local semi-professional footballer Jamie Mines, who suffered serious injuries following an electrical shock at work. Despite falling behind to their Southern League opponents goals from Nathan Smith and Rhys Browne earned Yeovil a fourth victory of pre-season. After a successful trial Yeovil confirmed the signing of Brazilian former Derby County midfielder Alefe Santos on a two-year contract. Yeovil then entertained League One club Bristol Rovers and suffered their second 3–1 defeat of pre-season with Nathan Smith scoring the Glovers only goal. On 28 July, Yeovil confirmed their ninth signing of pre-season with former Swansea City right back Daniel Alfei signing a two-year contract following a successful trial. Yeovil then traveled to Tiverton Town for their penultimate friendly of pre-season an entertaining match saw a brace from Connor Smith and goals from Zoko and Alefe Santos as the Glovers ran out 4–2 winners. Yeovil completed their pre-season schedule with a 3–1 defeat against Premier League side Bournemouth, with Swansea loanee Keston Davies scoring for the Glovers. Following the Bournemouth match, summer signing James Bailey was announced as Yeovil's new captain for the 2017–18 season replacing the released Darren Ward. Prior to the first competitive game of the season, Yeovil completed the signing of Sam Surridge on loan from Bournemouth until the end of the season.

Pre-season match details
Date	Opponents	Venue	Result	Score F–A	Scorers	Attendance	Ref
11 July 2017	Weymouth	A	W	2–1	Khan, Mugabi	729	
15 July 2017	Bristol City	H	L	1–3	Olomola	2,636	
19 July 2017	Llanelli Town	A	W	2–0	Khan, Zoko	381	
22 July 2017	Frome Town	A	W	2–1	N. Smith, Browne	474	
25 July 2017	Bristol Rovers	H	L	1–3	N. Smith	1,351	
29 July 2017	Tiverton Town	A	W	4–2	C. Smith (2), Zoko, Santos	261	
2 August 2017	Bournemouth	H	L	1–3	Davies	3,473	

=== August ===
Yeovil started their League Two season away against Luton Town, on 5 August. Despite taking the lead through an Otis Khan free kick, Yeovil suffered a record 8–2 defeat the heaviest opening day defeat in the Football League for 55 years, with François Zoko scoring the Glovers second consolation goal. After falling to their joint record Football League defeat on the opening day, the players agreed to refund the 258 fans who traveled to watch the team at Luton. On 8 August, Yeovil confirmed that centre-back Stéphane Zubar had been released from his "month-to-month" contract due to injury, without having made a competitive appearance. Yeovil then traveled to Championship club Wolverhampton Wanderers in the first round of the EFL Cup, a much improved performance saw Yeovil suffer a 1–0 defeat to exit the competition.

Yeovil then faced Accrington Stanley in their first home match of the season, a brace from Southampton loanee Olufela Olomola and a second goal of the season from Zoko saw Yeovil recover from falling behind to record a 3–2 victory. On 16 August, Yeovil completed the signing of versatile forward Jordan Green on a free transfer from Bournemouth. Yeovil then traveled to newly promoted Forest Green Rovers, early goals from Olomola and an Otis Khan penalty saw Yeovil take a 2–0 lead, after Forest Green pulled one back Zoko scored to give Yeovil a 3–1 lead but the Glovers collapsed in the second half to lose the match 4–3.

On 21 August, having conceded 14 goals in their first three league matches Yeovil moved to sign defender Sid Nelson on loan from Millwall until January. The signing of Nelson had an immediate impact with Yeovil recording their first clean sheet of the season in a 2–0 victory over Coventry City, on 26 August, with Rhys Browne scoring his first for the club and Olomola scoring his fourth of the season. On 29 August, Yeovil rounded off the month with a trip to Exeter City for their first match in the EFL Trophy group stages. The Glovers secured a 3–1 win with all the goals coming in the second half, a goal from Sam Surridge, his first for the club, was followed by goals for Rhys Browne and Otis Khan. Deadline day saw Yeovil complete the signing of Bournemouth midfielder Matt Worthington on loan until January.

=== September ===
Yeovil began September with a 2–0 defeat away at Crawley Town, followed by a goalless draw at home against Cheltenham Town. On 12 September, Yeovil faced Morecambe but despite taking a 2–0 lead through goals from François Zoko and Sam Surridge, Yeovil failed to see the game out and succumbed to a 2–2 draw. The Glovers then traveled to Grimsby Town and suffered an eighth successive away defeat in the league despite Zoko's fifth goal of the season. On 23 September, Yeovil faced bottom of the league side Port Vale but were held to a 1–1 draw with Otis Khan rescuing a point. After eight consecutive defeats away from home in the league Yeovil traveled to Chesterfield and won 3–2, after early goals from Olufela Olomola and Khan gave the Glovers a two-goal lead before being pegged back to 2–2 scored a last-minute winner from captain James Bailey. Yeovil ended the month with a visit from Colchester United where Yeovil's unbeaten home record came to an end with a 1–0 defeat.

=== October ===
After a stuttering start to the season it was reported that manager Darren Way had invited former Tottenham Hotspur manager Harry Redknapp to join the club in a voluntary advisory role. On 7 October, Yeovil suffered another away defeat this time away at Newport County losing 2–0 with both goals coming from corners taken by former player Matthew Dolan. After suffering a knee injury in Yeovil's 1–1 draw with Port Vale in September, it was confirmed that right-back Daniel Alfei had been ruled out for the season after rupturing his anterior cruciate ligament. On 11 October, Yeovil's under-18 side faced Bishop Sutton in the first round of the Somerset Premier Cup and won 1–0 with a late goal from Neville Nzembela. The following day saw the club announce the engagement of football consultant Mark Palmer of Insight 63 Ltd in a new advisory role.

Yeovil then faced Crewe Alexandra and picked up their first home win since August with goals from Rhys Browne and Olufela Olomola enough to secure a 2–0 victory. The club then slipped to a sixth defeat in seven away league matches with a 2–1 defeat at Cambridge United, on 17 October. On 21 October, an Otis Khan goal rescued a late point for Yeovil at Barnet in a 1–1 draw. Yeovil returned to Huish Park for the first of three consecutive home matches, on 25 October, the Glovers faced Chelsea U23s in the group stage of the EFL Trophy, winger Rhys Browne scored for the second home game in a row as the match ended 1–1 in normal time. Yeovil then picked up a bonus point after a 5–3 victory in the 'ABBA' penalty shootout. After the game, Darren Way confirmed that the club had employed former U18 manager Jamie Shore as a new first team coach.

On 28 October, Yeovil triumphed 3–0 at home to Stevenage with a brace from Sam Surridge and Olomola's seventh of the season all coming in the first half. The second half saw the Glovers reduced to nine men after both Olomola was dismissed for his part in a halfway line melee, and François Zoko was dismissed for a dangerously high foot. The match saw the inclusion of under-18 goalkeeper Tommy Scott on the substitutes bench for the first time after back-up goalkeeper Jonny Maddison suffered a head injury in training. The club later attempted to appeal the red card shown to Olomola but were ultimately unsuccessful. The end of the month saw the under-18 side be knocked out of the FA Youth Cup at the first round stage after losing 3–0 at home to Exeter City.

=== November ===
Yeovil began November with an FA Cup first round match against League One side Southend United, Otis Khan scored the only goal of the game, a penalty in the 29th minute, enough to send Yeovil through to the second round. This was followed up however, by a 4–0 away loss at Carlisle United, where Bevis Mugabi received a red card for an off the ball incident.

The third match of the month finished with a 2–1 loss at Huish Park, against Swindon Town, with Yeovil having taken the lead after just four minutes, with a goal from Rhys Browne. Yeovil then faced league leaders Notts County, on 21 November, a François Zoko penalty was enough to earn a 1–1 draw, despite a late red card for defender Sid Nelson for violent conduct. The Glovers then traveled to Wycombe Wanderers but two goals in the space of six first half minutes saw Yeovil consigned to yet another away defeat with Zoko grabbing what turned out to be a consolation goal as Yeovil lost 2–1. Yeovil's final match of the EFL Trophy group stage saw them triumph 2–1 against League One side Plymouth Argyle, with Tom James scoring his first goal for the club, and Bournemouth loanee Sam Surridge scoring his fifth goal of the season. The result was enough to see Yeovil top their group and qualify for the second round.

=== December ===
On 1 December, Yeovil confirmed the signing of midfielder Oscar Gobern on non-contract terms until the end of the season. Yeovil began December with a FA Cup second round tie against fellow League Two side Port Vale, the game ended 1–1 after a late header from substitute Jordan Green earned Yeovil a replay. The Glovers then faced League One side AFC Wimbledon in the second round of the EFL Trophy, first goals for the club from Keston Davies and Jake Gray secured Yeovil a comfortable 2–0 victory and progression into the third round. On 8 December, youth team defender Jeremiah Gyebi joined National League South side Poole Town on an initial month's loan deal. Yeovil's first league match of the month saw them succumb to a third home defeat of the season losing 2–0 to Lincoln City. On 12 December, Yeovil hosted Port Vale in their FA Cup second round replay, the two sides finished regular time with another 1–1 draw, with Otis Khan scoring a penalty in the first half, before a late equaliser for Port Vale, who had two men sent off. Khan scored a second in extra time, but after Port Vale equalised again, François Zoko scored the game's winner a minute later to send Yeovil through to the third round.

Yeovil then traveled to Mansfield Town and held their play-off chasing opponents to a goalless draw to record their first away clean sheet since February 2017, but the result saw them slip to 21st in the table only one point outside the relegation zone. On 23 December, Yeovil beat third place side Exeter City 3–1 with goals from Jake Gray, François Zoko and a Sam Surridge penalty. Boxing Day saw the Glovers travel to Cheltenham Town and record a second consecutive victory, second-half goals from Omar Sowunmi and Jordan Green earned Yeovil a 2–0 victory. Yeovil ended 2017 with a trip to Morecambe, the Glovers took the lead after just 25-seconds with Jake Gray scoring his third goal of December, Otis Khan's tenth goal of the season doubled Yeovil's lead, but a late collapse saw Yeovil lose the match 4–3, despite Omar Sowunmi giving Yeovil a 3–2 lead with just six minutes to go. Khan's goal against Morecambe was later awarded the League Two goal of the month award.

=== January ===
Yeovil started the new year with a home fixture against Crawley Town, despite taking the lead through Sam Surridge the Glovers lost the match 2–1 having been reduced to nine men with both Connor Smith and Omar Sowunmi being sent off. The first week of the January transfer window saw a high turnover of players with the loans of Sid Nelson, Olufela Olomola and Matt Worthington expiring while the loan of Keston Davies was terminated after he had failed to break into the Yeovil side. The four loans were replaced with Liverpool defender Corey Whelan, Barnsley midfielder Jared Bird, Middlesbrough attacking midfielder Lewis Wing and Southampton striker Marcus Barnes all joining the club on loan until the end of the season from their respective clubs. On 6 January, Yeovil faced League One side Bradford City in the third round of the FA Cup. Despite being the lowest ranked team left in the competition, Yeovil won the match 2–0 with a goal from Marcus Barnes on his debut and a third of the season from Jordan Green enough to see Yeovil through to the fourth round for only the fourth time in their history. Yeovil then faced Forest Green Rovers in the third round of the EFL Trophy, and secured back-to-back 2–0 wins with goals from Nathan and Connor Smith enough to secure qualification to the quarter-finals of the competition. Having established himself in the Yeovil team, attacker Jordan Green was rewarded with a new contract until the summer of 2019, while defender Tom James also signed an improved contract. On 13 January, Yeovil drew 1–1 away at relegation rivals Port Vale, with François Zoko scoring his tenth goal of the season to give the Glovers the lead but they conceded in the final five minutes to drop two points. The following week saw the club confirm that they had received a "substantial bid" for winger Otis Khan which had met a release clause in his contract, and that there had also been interest in defender Omar Sowunmi. On 20 January, Yeovil faced Chesterfield in a relegation six-pointer, after falling behind against the run of play Lewis Wing equalised with a 25-yard looping shot, his first goal for the club. In the final minute of injury time after Otis Khan appeared to have his shirt pulled he stopped playing allowing Chestefield to go up the other end to score a late winner with Khan then being sent off for shoving referee Kevin Johnson. Yeovil appealed the decision to send the midfielder off, but the appeal was deemed frivolous and Khan's ban was subsequently extended to five matches.

On 26 January, Yeovil faced Manchester United in the fourth round of the FA Cup in front of a sell out crowd of 9,195. Prior to the game Yeovil announced the signing of Alex Fisher on a free transfer from Scottish Premiership side Motherwell, with the striker signing an 18-month contract. The Glovers started the game brightly, but conceded just before half-time with Marcus Rashford giving the Premier League side the lead. During half-time the club confirmed the signing of Yeovil-born forward Ryan Seager on loan from Southampton until the end of the season. Ander Herrera extended Manchester United's lead after an hour before the superior quality of the Premier League side saw the Glovers concede two late goals to be knocked out of the FA Cup with a 4–0 defeat. The following day, the club confirmed their third signing of the weekend with West Bromwich Albion defender Shaun Donnellan, nephew of former Yeovil midfielder Gary, signing on an 18-month contract. Yeovil ended the month with a 3–0 victory over Grimsby Town with the visitors having been reduced to nine men, the Glovers ran out comfortable winners with goals from Lewis Wing, Rhys Browne and Jake Gray.

=== February ===
Yeovil secured their second win in a week with a 2–0 victory over Cambridge United, on 3 February 2018. Second half goals from defender Nathan Smith and substitute Alex Fisher's first for the club were enough to secure successive victories. On 6 February, Yeovil qualified for the semi-final of the EFL Trophy with a 3–2 victory over League One side Fleetwood Town. Having fallen behind, a last minute winner from top scorer François Zoko set up a tie with Shrewsbury Town. Yeovil then traveled to relegation-threatened Crewe Alexandra and secured a goalless draw having not had any shots on target. The match saw the Glovers lose both ever-present goalkeeper Artur Krysiak and defender Nathan Smith to long-term knee injuries. A 2–0 victory over bottom side Barnet saw the Glovers extend their unbeaten run to five matches in all competitions with a first-minute penalty from Sam Surridge and an injury time goal from Zoko enough to see Yeovil rise to 17th place in the league. The club's unbeaten run game to an end with a heavy 4–1 defeat away at Stevenage with Ryan Seager scoring Yeovil's consolation goal. Following the injury to Krysiak, the club signed experienced goalkeeper Stuart Nelson following his release from Gillingham on a contract until the end of the season. On 24 February, Yeovil suffered a second successive defeat losing 1–0 at home to Carlisle United, the match saw midfielder Jake Gray suffer a season-ending ankle injury. Freezing conditions at the end of February and early March saw Yeovil's EFL Trophy semi-final against Shrewsbury Town was postponed for seven days, as well as the club's league fixture against Swindon Town.

=== March ===
Following the postponement of their match against Swindon, Yeovil began March with their rearranged EFL Trophy semi-final tie against League One leaders Shrewsbury Town. The Glovers held their own but rarely threatened, and were knocked out courtesy of a Carlton Morris goal. On 7 March, defender Bevis Mugabi received a second call-up to the Uganda national football team for their March friendly matches. On 10 March, Yeovil suffered a 2–0 home defeat against Newport County. Due to international call-ups for Bevis Mugabi, Rhys Browne, Shaun Donnellan and Corey Whelan, Yeovil's trip to Accrington Stanley was postponed until the 17 April. Debuts for Stuart Nelson and Shaun Donnellan saw Yeovil end their three match losing run with a 0–0 draw away at promotion chasing Exeter City, this was then followed by a 1–0 away win at Colchester United with Nelson saving an early penalty before Alex Fisher scored the winning goal. The international break saw Bevis Mugabi make his full international debut for Uganda in friendlies against São Tomé and Príncipe and Malawi, while Rhys Browne scored his first international goal for Antigua and Barbuda in a 3–2 win against Bermuda. Donnellan and Whelan both featured for the Republic of Ireland U21s, with Donnellan scoring a crucial winning goal against Azerbaijan. The end of March also saw fans select the club's new shirt for the 2018–19 season made by TAG Sportswear, while the home match against Forest Green Rovers on Good Friday was postponed due to a waterlogged pitch.

=== April and May ===
Easter Monday saw Yeovil travel to play-off chasing Coventry City. Braces from Alex Fisher, François Zoko and Sam Surridge saw the Glovers win 6–2, the first time the club had scored six goals away from home in the Football League. On 7 April, Yeovil suffered a 3–0 home defeat against Luton Town, the match saw both Ryan Dickson and Zoko dismissed for the Glovers. In recognition of his performances in the EFL Trophy defender Tom James was named in the team of the tournament. Early April saw the club announce that it had made a small profit of £28,350 for the financial year ending June 2017. On 10 April, Yeovil traveled to Swindon Town and earned a point courtesy of late Alex Fisher equaliser. The 2–2 draw saw goalkeeper Stuart Nelson suffer a wrist injury that ruled him out for the remainder of the season. The Glovers suffered a fourth consecutive home defeat without scoring, on 14 April, with a 1–0 defeat against Wycombe Wanderers. Yeovil then suffered a 2–0 defeat away at Accrington Stanley, a match which saw the Lancashire side clinch promotion to League One for the first time in their history. A late Alex Fisher consolation was the only moment of cheer for Yeovil in a heavy 4–1 defeat away at promotion chasing Notts County, on 21 April. On 24 April, Yeovil and Forest Green Rovers played out a goalless draw which secured both sides Football League status with two games to spare. Yeovil's final home match of the season, saw them entertain Mansfield Town, the Glovers took the lead twice through Bevis Mugabi and Zoko, who scored his fifteenth goal of the season, but play-off chasing Mansfield fought back to win the game 3–2. Defender Omar Sowunmi was sent off late on the club's tenth red card of the season. The club's end of season awards, followed the conclusion of the match with all the awards shared between the trio of Tom James, Omar Sowunmi and François Zoko. Yeovil ended the season with a 1–1 defeat away at Lincoln City to finish the season in 19th place.

== Summary and aftermath ==
In the league the team won 8 matches, drew 5 and lost 10 at home, compared to winning 4, drawing 7 and losing 12 away from home. The club scored 59 league goals and conceded 75 the third most in the league. Sam Surridge recorded the highest number of appearances during the season, appearing in 53 of Yeovil's 59 matches. François Zoko finished as the club's top goalscorer for the third consecutive season with 15 goals, 13 of those coming in the league.

The end of the season saw manager Darren Way release four players. Defender Daniel Alfei was released having spent most of the season injured, and the experienced trio of Ryan Dickson, Artur Krysiak and Nathan Smith were released having made 130, 150 and 295 appearances for the club respectively. 36-year old goalkeeper Stuart Nelson agreed a new two-year contract, while the club triggered a one-year extension in midfielder Alefe Santos's contract. The club also offered new deals to Oscar Gobern and Omar Sowunmi. Yeovil offered no professional contracts to any of the club's second year scholars, with defender Joe Tomlinson signing for Premier League side Brighton & Hove Albion upon his release. Midfielder Oscar Gobern rejected the offer of a new deal to sign for National League side Eastleigh. On 26 June, goalkeeper Jonny Maddison agreed to terminate his contract to sign for National League North side Darlington. In late June, the club received a bid in the region of £100,000 which met the release clause of attacking midfielder Otis Khan from fellow League Two side Mansfield Town, Khan subsequently signed a two-year contract with the Nottinghamshire side. Defender Omar Sowunmi returned to the club for pre-season training having still not signed a new contract.

The off season saw Bevis Mugabi called up by Uganda for an invitational tournament in Niger.

== Transfers ==
=== In ===
Date	Name	From	Fee	Ref
16 June 2017	Rhys Browne	Grimsby Town	Undisclosed	
26 June 2017	Jake Gray	Luton Town	Undisclosed	
1 July 2017	Stéphane Zubar	Weymouth	Free	
1 July 2017	Connor Smith	Plymouth Argyle	Free (released)	
4 July 2017	James Bailey	Carlisle United	Free (released)	
25 July 2017	Alefe Santos	Derby County	Free (released)	
28 July 2017	Daniel Alfei	Aberystwyth Town	Free (released)	
16 August 2017	Jordan Green	Bournemouth	Free	
1 December 2017	Oscar Gobern	Ross County	Free (released)	
26 January 2017	Alex Fisher	Motherwell	Free	
27 January 2017	Shaun Donnellan	West Bromwich Albion	Free	
20 February 2018	Stuart Nelson	Gillingham	Free (released)	

=== Out ===
Date	Name	To	Fee	Ref
8 August 2017	Stéphane Zubar	Weymouth	Released	
26 June 2018	Jonny Maddison	Darlington	Contract terminated by mutual consent	
29 June 2018	Otis Khan	Mansfield Town	Undisclosed (~ £100,000)	
30 June 2018	Oscar Gobern	Eastleigh	Rejected new contract	
30 June 2018	Daniel Alfei	Llanelli Town	Released	
30 June 2018	Ryan Dickson	Torquay United	Released	
30 June 2018	Artur Krysiak	Bodø/Glimt	Released	
30 June 2018	Nathan Smith	Dagenham & Redbridge	Released	
30 June 2018	Joe Tomlinson	Brighton & Hove Albion	Released	

=== Loan in ===
Date	Name	From	End date	Ref
9 July 2017	Olufela Olomola	Southampton	3 January 2018	
14 July 2017	Keston Davies	Swansea City	3 January 2018	
3 August 2017	Sam Surridge	Bournemouth	6 May 2018	
21 August 2017	Sid Nelson	Millwall	1 January 2018	
31 August 2017	Matt Worthington	Bournemouth	1 January 2018	
4 January 2018	Jared Bird	Barnsley	6 May 2018	
5 January 2018	Corey Whelan	Liverpool	6 May 2018	
5 January 2018	Lewis Wing	Middlesbrough	6 May 2018	
5 January 2018	Marcus Barnes	Southampton	6 May 2018	
26 January 2018	Ryan Seager	Southampton	6 May 2018	

=== Loan out ===
Date	Name	To	End date	Ref
8 December 2017	Jeremiah Gyebi	Poole Town	8 January 2018	

== Match details ==
=== League Two ===
League Two match details
Date	League position	Opponents	Venue	Result	Score F–A	Scorers	Attendance	Ref
5 August 2017	24th	Luton Town	A	L	2–8	Khan, Zoko	8,101	
12 August 2017	15th	Accrington Stanley	H	W	3–2	Olomola (2), Zoko	2,464	
19 August 2017	21st	Forest Green Rovers	A	L	3–4	Olomola, Khan (pen), Zoko	2,615	
26 August 2017	12th	Coventry City	H	W	2–0	Browne, Olomola	3,754	
2 September 2017	18th	Crawley Town	A	L	0–2		2,024	
9 September 2017	17th	Cheltenham Town	H	D	0–0		2,732	
12 September 2017	17th	Morecambe	H	D	2–2	Zoko, Surridge	2,205	
16 September 2017	19th	Grimsby Town	A	L	1–2	Zoko	3,945	
23 September 2017	19th	Port Vale	H	D	1–1	Khan	2,614	
26 September 2017	14th	Chesterfield	A	W	3–2	Olomola, Khan, Bailey	3,955	
30 September 2017	17th	Colchester United	H	L	0–1		2,556	
7 October 2017	20th	Newport County	A	L	0–2		3,689	
14 October 2017	17th	Crewe Alexandra	H	W	2–0	Browne, Olomola	2,360	
17 October 2017	18th	Cambridge United	A	L	1–2	Mugabi	4,328	
21 October 2017	18th	Barnet	A	D	1–1	Khan	1,751	
28 October 2017	17th	Stevenage	H	W	3–0	Surridge (2), Olomola	2,439	
11 November 2017	17th	Carlisle United	A	L	0–4		4,189	
18 November 2017	17th	Swindon Town	H	L	1–2	Browne	3,622	
21 November 2017	18th	Notts County	H	D	1–1	Zoko (pen)	2,338	
25 November 2017	18th	Wycombe Wanderers	A	L	1–2	Zoko	3,834	
9 December 2017	20th	Lincoln City	H	L	0–2		2,472	
16 December 2017	21st	Mansfield Town	A	D	0–0		3,032	
23 December 2017	19th	Exeter City	H	W	3–1	Gray, Zoko, Surridge (pen)	4,834	
26 December 2017	19th	Cheltenham Town	A	W	2–0	Sowunmi, Green	3,484	
29 December 2017	19th	Morecambe	A	L	3–4	Gray, Khan, Sowunmi	1,124	
1 January 2018	20th	Crawley Town	H	L	1–3	Surridge	2,635	
13 January 2018	21st	Port Vale	A	D	1–1	Zoko	4,120	
20 January 2018	21st	Chesterfield	H	L	1–2	Wing	3,792	
30 January 2018	19th	Grimsby Town	H	W	3–0	Wing, Browne, Gray	2,330	
3 February 2018	18th	Cambridge United	H	W	2–0	N. Smith, Fisher	2,569	
10 February 2018	18th	Crewe Alexandra	A	D	0–0		3,498	
13 February 2018	17th	Barnet	H	W	2–0	Surridge (pen), Zoko	2,455	
17 February 2018	17th	Stevenage	A	L	1–4	Seager	2,355	
24 February 2018	17th	Carlisle United	H	L	0–1		2,688	
10 March 2018	17th	Newport County	H	L	0–2		2,880	
13 March 2018	17th	Exeter City	A	D	0–0		3,913	
17 March 2018	17th	Colchester United	A	W	1–0	Fisher	2,272	
2 April 2018	17th	Coventry City	A	W	6–2	Fisher (2), Zoko (2), Surridge (2)	8,787	
7 April 2018	18th	Luton Town	H	L	0–3		4,316	
10 April 2018	18th	Swindon Town	A	D	2–2	Wing, Fisher	5,709	
14 April 2018	18th	Wycombe Wanderers	H	L	0–1		3,307	
17 April 2018	18th	Accrington Stanley	A	L	0–2		3,176	
21 April 2018	19th	Notts County	A	L	1–4	Fisher	7,359	
24 April 2018	19th	Forest Green Rovers	H	D	0–0		2,789	
28 April 2018	20th	Mansfield Town	H	L	2–3	Mugabi, Zoko (pen)	3,500	
5 May 2018	19th	Lincoln City	A	D	1–1	Green	10,004	

==== League table ====
Pos	Team	Pld	W	D	L	GF	GA	GD	Pts
17	Cheltenham Town	46	13	12	21	67	73	−6	51
18	Grimsby Town	46	13	12	21	42	66	−24	51
19	Yeovil Town	46	12	12	22	59	75	−16	48
20	Port Vale	46	11	14	21	49	67	−18	47
21	Forest Green Rovers	46	13	8	25	54	77	−23	47

Source: BBC Sport
Rules for classification: 1) Points; 2) Goal difference; 3) Number of goals scored

=== FA Cup ===
FA Cup match details
Round	Date	Opponents	Venue	Result	Score F–A	Scorers	Attendance	Ref
First round	4 November 2017	Southend United	H	W	1–0	Khan (pen)	2,079	
Second round	2 December 2017	Port Vale	A	D	1–1	Green	3,316	
Second round replay	12 December 2017	Port Vale	H	W	3–2^{[A]}	Khan (2, 1 pen), Zoko	1,588	
Third round	6 January 2018	Bradford City	H	W	2–0	Barnes, Green	3,040	
Fourth round	26 January 2018	Manchester United	H	L	0–4		9,195	

=== EFL Cup ===
EFL Cup match details
Round	Date	Opponents	Venue	Result	Score F–A	Scorers	Attendance	Ref
First round	8 August 2017	Wolverhampton Wanderers	A	L	0–1		9,478	

=== EFL Trophy ===
EFL Trophy match details
Round	Date	Opponents	Venue	Result	Score F–A	Scorers	Attendance	Ref
Southern Group D	29 August 2017	Exeter City	A	W	3–1	Surridge, Browne, Khan	1,509	
Southern Group D	25 October 2017	Chelsea U23s	H	D	1–1^{[B]}	Browne	1,896	
Southern Group D	28 November 2017	Plymouth Argyle	H	W	2–1	James, Surridge	1,110	
Second round	5 December 2017	AFC Wimbledon	H	W	2–0	Davies, Gray	886	
Third round	9 January 2018	Forest Green Rovers	H	W	2–0	N. Smith, C. Smith	1,395	
Quarter-final	6 February 2018	Fleetwood Town	H	W	3–2	Bolger (og), Whelan, Zoko	1,314	
Semi-final	6 March 2018	Shrewsbury Town	A	L	0–1		4,118	

==== Group table ====
Pos	Lge	Team	Pld	W	PW	PL	L	GF	GA	GD	Pts	Qualification
1	L2	Yeovil Town (Q)	3	2	1	0	0	6	3	+3	8	Round 2
2	ACA	Chelsea U21 (Q)	3	1	0	2	0	6	4	+2	5	Round 2
3	L1	Plymouth Argyle (E)	3	0	2	0	1	5	6	−1	4	
4	L2	Exeter City (E)	3	0	0	1	2	4	8	−4	1	

Updated to match(es) played on 28 November 2017. Source: EFL.com
(E) Eliminated; (Q) Qualified to the phase indicated

== Squad statistics ==
Numbers in parentheses denote appearances as substitute.
Players with squad numbers struck through and marked † left the club during the playing season.
Players with names in italics and marked * were on loan from another club for the whole of their season with Yeovil.
Players listed with no appearances have been in the matchday squad but only as unused substitutes.
Key to positions: GK – Goalkeeper; DF – Defender; MF – Midfielder; FW – Forward

No.	Pos.	Nat.	Name	Apps	Goals	Apps	Goals	Apps	Goals	Apps	Goals	Apps	Goals	Yellow card	Red card
No.	Pos.	Nat.	Name	League		FA Cup		EFL Cup		EFL Trophy		Total		Discipline	
1	GK	POL	Artur Krysiak	33	0	5	0	1	0	6	0	45	0	2	0
2	DF	WAL	Daniel Alfei	2	0	0	0	1	0	1	0	4	0	1	0
3	DF	JAM	Nathan Smith	30 (1)	1	5	0	1	0	4	1	40 (1)	2	9	0
~~4~~ †	MF	ENG	Matt Worthington *	13 (2)	0	1 (1)	0	0	0	1 (1)	0	15 (4)	0	2	0
4	MF	ENG	Jared Bird *	9 (2)	0	2	0	0	0	2 (1)	0	13 (3)	0	1	0
5	DF	UGA	Bevis Mugabi	19 (3)	2	2	0	0	0	4	0	25 (3)	2	2	1
~~6~~ †	DF	WAL	Keston Davies *	1 (1)	0	0	0	0	0	2 (1)	1	3 (2)	1	0	0
6	MF	ENG	Lewis Wing *	18 (2)	3	1 (1)	0	0	0	0	0	19 (3)	3	1	0
7	MF	ENG	Otis Khan	35 (3)	6	4	3	1	0	5 (1)	1	45 (4)	10	6	1
8	MF	IRL	Connor Smith	15 (4)	0	1 (2)	0	1	0	4 (1)	1	21 (7)	1	4	1
9	MF	ATG	Rhys Browne	16 (19)	4	1 (1)	0	1	0	2 (2)	2	20 (22)	6	4	0
10	MF	ENG	Jake Gray	21 (5)	3	4	0	0 (1)	0	5 (1)	1	30 (7)	4	1	0
11	DF	ENG	Ryan Dickson	35 (1)	0	4	0	1	0	2	0	42 (1)	0	4	1
12	GK	ENG	Jonny Maddison	8 (2)	0	0	0	0	0	1	0	9 (2)	0	0	0
13	FW	CIV	François Zoko	35 (2)	13	4	1	1	0	2 (4)	1	42 (6)	15	12	2
14	FW	ENG	Sam Surridge *	22 (19)	8	4	0	0 (1)	0	5 (2)	2	31 (22)	10	4	0
15	MF	ENG	Jordan Green	18 (19)	2	2 (2)	2	0	0	6	0	26 (21)	4	4	0
16	MF	ENG	James Bailey	24	1	3	0	1	0	1	0	29	1	3	0
17	DF	ENG	Omar Sowunmi	35 (1)	2	4	0	1	0	5	0	45 (1)	2	6	2
18	FW	ENG	Alex Fisher	13 (4)	6	0 (1)	0	0	0	1	0	14 (5)	6	1	0
19	FW	ENG	Marcus Barnes *	1 (7)	0	1	1	0	0	0	0	2 (7)	1	0	0
20	MF	ENG	Oscar Gobern	7 (4)	0	0 (1)	0	0	0	2	0	9 (5)	0	2	0
21	FW	ENG	Ryan Seager *	2 (5)	1	0	0	0	0	0	0	2 (5)	1	0	0
22	DF	IRL	Corey Whelan *	6 (1)	0	0 (1)	0	0	0	3	1	9 (2)	1	1	0
23	DF	WAL	Tom James	37 (1)	0	5	0	1	0	6 (1)	1	49 (2)	1	8	0
~~24~~ †	FW	ENG	Olufela Olomola *	19 (2)	7	1 (1)	0	0 (1)	0	3 (1)	0	23 (5)	7	3	1
24	GK	ENG	Steve Phillips	0	0	0	0	0	0	0	0	0	0	0	0
~~25~~ †	DF	ENG	Sid Nelson *	12	0	0	0	0	0	1 (1)	0	13 (1)	0	3	1
25	GK	ENG	Stuart Nelson	5	0	0	0	0	0	0	0	5	0	0	0
27	DF	IRL	Shaun Donnellan	11	0	0	0	0	0	0	0	11	0	1	0
29	FW	LTU	Paulius Golubickas	0	0	0	0	0	0	0	0	0	0	0	0
30	MF	BRA	Alefe Santos	6 (8)	0	1 (3)	0	0	0	3 (3)	0	10 (14)	0	2	0
31	GK	ENG	Tommy Scott	0	0	0	0	0	0	0	0	0	0	0	0

Players not included in matchday squads
No.	Pos.	Nat.	Name
~~20~~ †	DF	GLP	Stéphane Zubar

=== Suspensions ===
Player	Date Received	Offence	Length of suspension	
Nathan Smith	(yellow card) v Chesterfield, 26 September	Five cautions	1 match	Colchester United (H), League Two
François Zoko	(yellow card) v Crewe Alexandra, 14 October	Five cautions	1 match	Cambridge United (A), League Two
Rhys Browne	(yellow card) v Chelsea U23, 25 October	Two cautions	1 match	Plymouth Argyle (H), EFL Trophy
Olufela Olomola	(red card) v Stevenage, 28 October	Violent conduct	3 matches	Southend United (H), FA Cup; Carlisle United (A), Swindon Town (H), League Two
François Zoko	(red card) v Stevenage, 28 October	Serious foul play	3 matches	Southend United (H), FA Cup; Carlisle United (A), Swindon Town (H), League Two
Bevis Mugabi	(red card) v Carlisle United, 11 November	Violent conduct	3 matches	Swindon Town (H), Notts County (H), Wycombe Wanderers (A), League Two
Sid Nelson	(red card) v Notts County, 21 November	Violent conduct	3 matches	Wycombe Wanderers (A), League Two; Port Vale (A) FA Cup; Lincoln City (H), League Two
Connor Smith	(yellow card) (yellow-red card) v Crawley Town, 1 January	Second bookable offence	1 match	Bradford City (H), FA Cup
Omar Sowunmi	(red card) v Crawley Town, 1 January	Denying an obvious goalscoring opportunity	1 match	Bradford City (H), FA Cup
Otis Khan	(red card) v Chesterfield, 20 January	Violent conduct	5 matches	Manchester United (H), FA Cup; Grimsby Town (H), Cambridge United (H), Crewe Alexandra (A), Barnet (H), League Two
François Zoko	(yellow card) v Barnet, 13 February	Ten cautions	2 matches	Stevenage (A), Carlisle United (H), League Two
Ryan Dickson	(red card) v Luton Town, 7 April	Denying an obvious goalscoring opportunity	1 match	Swindon Town (A), League Two
François Zoko	(red card) v Luton Town, 7 April	Violent conduct	4 matches	Swindon Town (A), Wycombe Wanderers (H), Accrington Stanley (A), Notts County (A), League Two
Omar Sowunmi	(yellow card) (yellow-red card) v Mansfield Town, 28 April	Second bookable offence	2 matches	Lincoln City (A), League Two; First competitive match of 2018–19 season

== Footnotes ==
A. Yeovil Town won 3–2 after extra time.
B. Yeovil Town won 5–3 in a penalty shootout following a 1–1 draw in normal time.

== See also ==
- 2017–18 in English football
- List of Yeovil Town F.C. seasons
