= Marcus Barnes =

English footballer (born 1996)

Personal information
- Full name: Marcus Thomas Barnes
- Date of birth: 1 December 1996 (age 29)
- Place of birth: Reading, England
- Height: 1.85 m (6 ft 1 in)
- Position: Forward

Team information
- Current team: Mickleover

Youth career
- –2013: Wolverhampton Wanderers
- 2013–2015: Southampton

Senior career*
Years	Team	Apps	(Gls)
2015–2020	Southampton	0	(0)
2018	→ Yeovil Town (loan)	8	(0)
2019–2020	→ Eastleigh (loan)	14	(2)
2021	Oldham Athletic	7	(0)
2022	Northern Colorado Hailstorm	0	(0)
2023–	Mickleover	33	(15)
- * Club domestic league appearances and goals as of 10 June 2024

Marcus Thomas Barnes (born 1 December 1996) is an English professional footballer who plays as a forward for Mickleover. He is the younger brother of Jamaica international Giles Barnes.

== Career ==
Barnes joined the Academy at Southampton in September 2013, and signed his first professional contract upon turning 17 three months later after scoring six goals in his first 13 appearances for the under-18 team. On 5 January 2018, he joined EFL League Two side Yeovil Town on loan until the end of the 2017–18 season. He made his competitive debut the following day against Bradford City in a Third Round FA Cup match at Huish Park, scoring the opening goal in a 2–0 victory.

Barnes appeared as a substitute for the first team on 5 January 2019 in the FA Cup third round against Derby County at Pride Park.

On 22 January 2021, Barnes joined League Two side Oldham Athletic following a successful trial, signing a contract until the end of the 2020–21 season.

On 11 August 2022, Barnes signed with third-tier US side Northern Colorado Hailstorm, who compete in the USL League One.

In July 2023, Barnes signed for Southern League Premier Division Central club Mickleover.

== Personal life ==
Barnes is of Jamaican descent. He is the younger brother of Jamaica international Giles Barnes.

== Career statistics ==
As of match played 1 May 2021.

Appearances and goals by club, season and competition
Club	Season	League			FA Cup		League Cup		Other		Total	
Club	Season	Division	Apps	Goals	Apps	Goals	Apps	Goals	Apps	Goals	Apps	Goals
Southampton	2017–18	Premier League	0	0	—		0	0	—		0	0
Southampton	2018–19	Premier League	0	0	1	0	0	0	—		1	0
Southampton	2019–20	Premier League	0	0	0	0	0	0	—		0	0
Southampton	Total		0	0	1	0	0	0	—		1	0
Southampton U23	2017–18	—			—		—		14 (Note: Appearances in EFL Trophy)	4	14	4
Southampton U23	2018–19	—			—		—		25	10	25	10
Yeovil Town (loan)	2017–18	League Two	8	0	1	1	0	0	—		9	1
Eastleigh (loan)	2019–20	National League	14	2	5	2	—		1 (Note: Appearance in FA Trophy)	1	20	5
Oldham Athletic	2020–21	League Two	7	0	—		—		—		7	0
Mickleover	2023-24	Southern League Premier Division Central	33	15	3	0			3	3	39	18
Career total			62	17	10	3	0	0	43	18	115	38
