= Keston Davies =

Welsh footballer (born 1996)

Personal information
- Full name: Keston Ellis Davies
- Date of birth: 2 October 1996 (age 30)
- Place of birth: Swansea, Wales
- Position: Defender

Team information
- Current team: Barry Town United
- Number: 6

Youth career
- 2005–2008: Swansea City
- 2008–2012: Fulham
- 2012–2017: Swansea City

Senior career*
Years	Team	Apps	(Gls)
2017–2019	Swansea City	0	(0)
2017–2018	→ Yeovil Town (loan)	2	(0)
2018–2019	→ Notts County (loan)	7	(0)
2019–2023	The New Saints	56	(2)
2023–2025	Pontypridd United	48	(2)
2025–	Barry Town United	32	(2)

International career^{‡}
2012	Wales U17	2	(0)
2013	Wales U19	1	(0)
2018	Wales U21	1	(0)
- * Club domestic league appearances and goals as of 07:46, 8 November 2026 (UTC) ‡ National team caps and goals as of 20:51, 16 October 2018 (UTC)

Keston Ellis Davies (born 2 October 1996) is a Welsh professional footballer who plays as a defender for Cymru Premier club Barry Town United. He is a former Wales Under-21 international.

== Club career ==
After playing for the foundation phase of the Swansea City academy between the ages of eight to 11, Davies left to join Fulham's academy before returning to Swansea at the age of 15.

On 14 July 2017, Davies joined League Two club Yeovil Town on loan until the end of the season. Davies made his EFL debut for Yeovil against Luton Town, on 5 August 2017. Davies was recalled to Swansea in January 2018, having only made five appearances for Yeovil.

On 31 August 2018, Davies signed for League Two club Notts County on loan until the end of the season.

In July 2019 he joined The New Saints.

In June 2025 Davies signed for Barry Town United.

== Career statistics ==
As of match played 1 May 2022

Appearances and goals by club, season and competition
Club	Season	League			National Cup		League Cup		Other		Total	
Club	Season	Division	Apps	Goals	Apps	Goals	Apps	Goals	Apps	Goals	Apps	Goals
Swansea City	2016–17	Premier League	0	0	0	0	0	0	—		0	0
Swansea City	2017–18	Premier League	0	0	0	0	0	0	—		0	0
Swansea City	2018–19	Championship	0	0	0	0	0	0	—		0	0
Swansea City	Total		0	0	0	0	0	0	—		0	0
Swansea City U23	2016–17	—			—		—		6 (Note: Appearance(s) in EFL Trophy)	0	6	0
Swansea City U23	2018–19	—			—		—		1	0	1	0
Yeovil Town (loan)	2017–18	League Two	2	0	0	0	0	0	3	1	5	1
Notts County (loan)	2018–19	League Two	7	0	0	0	0	0	—		7	0
The New Saints	2019–20	Cymru Premier	20	2	1	0	0	0	6 (Note: Three appearances in UEFA Champions League, two appearances in UEFA Europa League, one appearance in Scottish Challenge Cup)	0	27	2
The New Saints	2020–21	Cymru Premier	10	0	0	0	0	0	1 (Note: Appearance in UEFA Europa League)	0	11	0
The New Saints	2021–22	Cymru Premier	14	0	2	0	0	0	6 (Note: Appearances in UEFA Europa Conference League)	0	22	0
The New Saints	Total		44	2	3	0	0	0	13	0	60	2
Career total			53	2	3	0	0	0	23	1	79	3

== Honours ==
=== Swansea City U23s ===
- Premier League Cup: 2016–17

=== The New Saints ===
- Cymru Premier: 2021–22
- Welsh Cup: 2021–22
