= Matt Worthington =

English footballer

Personal information
- Full name: Matthew Luke Worthington
- Date of birth: 18 December 1997 (age 28)
- Place of birth: Southampton, England
- Position: Midfielder

Team information
- Current team: Torquay United
- Number: 18

Youth career
- 2006–2008: Portsmouth
- 2008–2011: Southampton
- 2011–2016: AFC Bournemouth

Senior career*
Years	Team	Apps	(Gls)
2016–2019	AFC Bournemouth	1	(0)
2016	→ Eastbourne Borough (loan)	4	(0)
2017–2018	→ Yeovil Town (loan)	15	(0)
2018–2019	→ Forest Green Rovers (loan)	9	(1)
2019–2025	Yeovil Town	204	(11)
2025	Oldham Athletic	9	(0)
2025–	Torquay United	32	(3)
- * Club domestic league appearances and goals as of 09:07, 17 April 2026 (UTC)

Matthew Luke Worthington (born 18 December 1997) is an English footballer who plays as a midfielder for National League South club Torquay United.

== Career ==
=== AFC Bournemouth ===
Worthington made his Premier League debut for AFC Bournemouth on the final day of the 2016–17 season where he came on as a 74th minute substitute in a 1–1 away at Leicester City.

==== Yeovil Town loan ====
On 31 August 2017, Worthington signed for League Two club Yeovil Town on loan until January 2018.

==== Forest Green loan ====
On 31 August 2018, Worthington signed for League Two club Forest Green Rovers on loan until January 2019.

=== Yeovil Town ===
On 18 January 2019, Worthington re-signed permanently for League Two club Yeovil Town on a free transfer from AFC Bournemouth, signing a contract until June 2021. Worthington signed a new one-year deal in June 2022.

=== Oldham Athletic ===
On 24 January 2025, Worthington signed permanently for National League club Oldham Athletic on a free transfer.

=== Torquay United ===
On 17 July 2025, Worthington joined National League South side Torquay United on a three-year deal.

== Career statistics ==
As of match played 11 April 2026

Appearances and goals by club, season and competition
Club	Season	League			FA Cup		League Cup		Other		Total	
Club	Season	Division	Apps	Goals	Apps	Goals	Apps	Goals	Apps	Goals	Apps	Goals
AFC Bournemouth	2015–16	Premier League	0	0	0	0	0	0	—		0	0
AFC Bournemouth	2016–17	Premier League	1	0	0	0	0	0	—		1	0
AFC Bournemouth	2017–18	Premier League	0	0	0	0	0	0	—		0	0
AFC Bournemouth	2018–19	Premier League	0	0	0	0	0	0	—		0	0
AFC Bournemouth	AFC Bournemouth Total		1	0	0	0	0	0	—		1	0
Eastbourne Borough (loan)	2015–16	National League South	4	0	0	0	—		0	0	4	0
Yeovil Town (loan)	2017–18	League Two	15	0	2	0	0	0	2 (Note: Appearances in EFL Trophy)	0	19	0
Forest Green Rovers (loan)	2018–19	League Two	9	1	2	0	0	0	3	0	14	1
Yeovil Town	2018–19	League Two	15	0	—		—		—		15	0
Yeovil Town	2019–20	National League	31	3	2	0	—		4 (Note: Two appearances in FA Trophy, one appearance in Somerset Premier Cup, one appearance in National League play-offs)	0	37	3
Yeovil Town	2020–21	National League	26	0	1	0	—		0	0	27	0
Yeovil Town	2021–22	National League	31	0	5	1	—		5 (Note: Two appearances in FA Trophy, three appearances in Somerset Premier Cup)	0	41	1
Yeovil Town	2022–23	National League	37	4	2	0	—		2 (Note: One appearance in FA Trophy, one appearance and one goal in Somerset Premier Cup)	1	41	5
Yeovil Town	2023–24	National League South	43	4	4	0	—		1 (Note: Appearance in FA Trophy)	0	48	4
Yeovil Town	2024–25	National League	21	0	0	0	—		1	0	22	0
Yeovil Town	Yeovil Town Total		219	11	16	1	0	0	15	1	250	13
Oldham Athletic	2024–25	National League	9	0	—		—		1 (Note: Appearance in National League Cup)	0	10	0
Torquay United	2025–26	National League South	32	3	1	0	—		0	0	33	3
Career total			274	15	19	1	0	0	19	1	312	17

== Honours ==
Yeovil Town

- National League South: 2023–24

Individual

- National League South Team of the Season: 2023–24
