= 2017–18 Swansea City A.F.C. season =

Swansea City
2017–18 season
- Chairman: Huw Jenkins
- Head coach: Paul Clement (Until 20 December); Carlos Carvalhal (From 28 December)
- Stadium: Liberty Stadium
- Premier League: 18th (relegated)
- FA Cup: Quarter-finals
- EFL Cup: Fourth round
- Top goalscorer: League: Jordan Ayew (7); All: Jordan Ayew (11)
- Highest home attendance: 20,933
- Lowest home attendance: 19,580
- Average home league attendance: 20,622
Home colours	Away colours	Third colours

The 2017–18 season was Swansea City's 98th season in the English football league system, and their seventh consecutive season in the Premier League. Along with competing in the Premier League, the club competed in the FA Cup and EFL Cup. The season covered the period from 1 July 2017 to 30 June 2018.

Swansea's relegation to the Championship was confirmed on 13 May 2018, the final day of the Premier League season, by virtue of them losing 2–1 at home to already relegated Stoke City, where only a win and a ten-goal difference swing over Southampton would have ensured survival.

== Club ==
=== Directors ===
Position	Name
Owners	(United States) Jason Levien (United States) Steve Kaplan
Chairman	(Wales) Huw Jenkins
Vice Chairman	(Wales) Leigh Dineen
Chief Operating Officer	(United States) Chris Pearlman
Directors	(Wales) Martin Morgan (Wales) Stuart McDonald (United States) Romie Chaudhari (United States) Bobby Hernreich

=== Behind the team ===
Position	Name
Head coach	(England) Paul Clement until December 2017
Head coach	(Portugal) Carlos Carvalhal from December 2017
Assistant coaches	(England) Nigel Gibbs until December 2017
Assistant coaches	(France) Claude Makélélé until November 2017
Assistant coaches	(England) Leon Britton; November 2017 to December 2017
Assistant coaches	(Portugal) João Mário from December 2017
Assistant coaches	(Portugal) Bruno Lage from December 2017
Analysts	(Portugal) Jhony Conceição from December 2017
Analysts	(Portugal) Paulo Sampaio from December 2017
Head of physical performance	(England) Karl Halabi until December 2017
Assistant head of physical performance	(England) Eddie Lattimore until December 2017
Physical performance coach	(Wales) Jordan Smith
Goalkeeping coach	(Wales) Tony Roberts
Loan player manager	(Wales) Alan Curtis
Performance director	(Wales) Rich Buchanan
Head of medicine/club doctor	(Wales) Dr. Jez McClusky
Physiotherapists	(Wales) Kate Rees
Physiotherapists	(Wales) Ailsa Jones
Physiotherapists	(Wales) Ritson Lloyd
Lead soft tissue therapist	(Wales) Andy Stanbury
Soft tissue therapists	(Wales) Adele Callaghan
Soft tissue therapists	(Wales) Matthew Murray
Player liaison officer	(Wales) Huw Lake
Head of recruitment	(England) David Leadbeater
Technical recruitment scout	(England) Tim Henderson
Assistant technical recruitment scout	(England) Ian Roscrow
Match analysts	(Wales) Scott Helmich
Match analysts	(Wales) Alex Thomas
Football utilities co-ordinator	(Wales) Suzan Eames
Football utilities assistants	(Wales) Michael Eames
Football utilities assistants	(Wales) Shaun Baggridge

== Squad information ==
=== First team squad ===
N	Pos.	Nat.	Name	Age	EU	Since	App	Goals	Ends	Transfer fee	Notes
1	GK	(Poland)	Łukasz Fabiański	32	EU	2014	112	0	2019	Free	
2	CF	(Ivory Coast)	Wilfried Bony	28	Non-EU	2017	70	35	2019	Undisclosed	
4	CM	(South Korea)	Ki Sung-yueng	28	Non-EU	2012	130	10	2018	£5,500,000	
5	CB	(Netherlands)	Mike van der Hoorn	24	EU	2016	11	1	2019	Undisclosed	
6	CB	(England)	Alfie Mawson	23	EU	2016	27	4	2020	Undisclosed	
7	DM	(England)	Leon Britton	34	EU	2011	521	17	2018	Undisclosed	
8	CM	(Netherlands)	Leroy Fer	27	EU	2016	48	6	2019	Undisclosed	
10	CF	(England)	Tammy Abraham	19	EU	2017	0	0	2018	Loan	
11	RM	(Netherlands)	Luciano Narsingh	26	EU	2017	13	0	2019	£4,000,000	
12	RM	(England)	Nathan Dyer	29	EU	2009	281	31	2020	£400,000	
13	GK	(Sweden)	Kristoffer Nordfeldt	28	EU	2015	8	0	2018	£600,000	
14	CM	(England)	Tom Carroll	25	EU	2017	35	2	2020	Undisclosed	
15	LM	(England)	Wayne Routledge	32	EU	2011	212	21	2018	Undisclosed	
16	LB	(Sweden)	Martin Olsson	29	EU	2017	15	2	2019	Undisclosed	
17	CM	(England)	Sam Clucas	26	EU	2017	0	0	2021	Undisclosed	
18	CF	(Ghana)	Jordan Ayew	25	Non-EU	2017	14	1	2020	£5,000,000	
22	RB	(Spain)	Àngel Rangel (C)	34	EU	2007	367	10	2018	Undisclosed	
25	GK	(Netherlands)	Erwin Mulder	28	EU	2017	0	0	2020	Free	
26	RB	(England)	Kyle Naughton	28	EU	2015	71	1	2020	Undisclosed	
27	CB	(England)	Kyle Bartley	26	EU	2012	26	0	2021	£1,000,000	
33	CB	(Argentina)	Federico Fernández	28	EU	2014	93	1	2020	Undisclosed	
35	CM	(Portugal)	Renato Sanches	20	EU	2017	0	0	2018	Loan	
51	DM	(Spain)	Roque Mesa	28	EU	2017	0	0	2021	£11,000,000	
56	CM	(Scotland)	Jay Fulton	23	EU	2014	22	1	2020	Undisclosed	
62	CF	(Scotland)	Oli McBurnie	21	EU	2015	6	2	2018	Undisclosed	

Updated to match played 8 September 2017
Source: Swansea City Official Website
Ordered by 2017–18 squad numbers.

== Transfers ==
=== Transfers in ===
Date	Position	Nationality	Name	From	Contract length	Fee	Ref.
1 July 2017	GK	(Netherlands)	Erwin Mulder	Heerenveen	3 years	Free	
5 July 2017	CM	(Netherlands)	Kees de Boer	Ajax	3 years	Youth	
6 July 2017	DM	(Spain)	Roque Mesa	Las Palmas	4 years	£11,000,000	
7 July 2017	AM	(Iceland)	Arnór Guðjohnsen	Breiðablik UBK	3 years	Youth	
8 July 2017	RW	(Republic of Ireland)	Marc Walsh	Finn Harps	3 years	Youth	
9 July 2017	RW	(England)	Jayden Reid	Manchester United	2 years	Youth	
17 July 2017	CB	(Wales)	Cian Harries	Coventry City	3 years	Undisclosed	
14 August 2017	CF	(England)	Courtney Baker-Richardson	Leamington	3 years	Undisclosed	
24 August 2017	DF	(England)	Jack Bainbridge	Everton	1 year	Free	
24 August 2017	CM	(England)	Sam Clucas	Hull City	4 years	Undisclosed	
31 August 2017	GK	(Germany)	Steven Benda	1860 Munich	3 years	Undisclosed	
31 August 2017	CF	(Ivory Coast)	Wilfried Bony	Manchester City	2 years (Note: Bony contract includes option for a third year.)	Undisclosed	
17 October 2017	LB	(Slovenia)	Matic Paljk	Koper	1 year	Free	
31 January 2018	LW	(Ghana)	André Ayew	West Ham United	3.5 years	£18,000,000	
31 January 2018	CB	(England)	Jack Withers	Boston United	1.5 years	Undisclosed	

=== Loans in ===
Date from	Position	Nationality	Name	From	Expiry date	Ref.
4 July 2017	CF	(England)	Tammy Abraham	Chelsea	30 June 2018	
31 August 2017	CM	(Portugal)	Renato Sanches	Bayern Munich	30 June 2018	
31 January 2018	CM	(Wales)	Andy King	Leicester City	30 June 2018	

=== Transfers out ===
Date	Position	Nationality	Name	To	Fee	Ref.
1 July 2017	CM	(Wales)	Tom Dyson	Free agent	Released	
1 July 2017	LW	(Wales)	Liam Edwards	Hull City	Released	(Note: Liam Edwards joined Hull City after his release.)
1 July 2017	CF	(Netherlands)	Marvin Emnes	Akhisar Belediyespor	Released	(Note: Marvin Emnes joined Akhisar Belediyespor after his release.)
1 July 2017	CF	(France)	Bafétimbi Gomis	Galatasaray	Undisclosed	
1 July 2017	CM	(Republic of Ireland)	Tom Holland	The New Saints	Released	(Note: Tom Holland joined The New Saints after his release.)
1 July 2017	CF	(Wales)	Owain Jones	Merthyr Town	Released	(Note: Owain Jones joined Merthyr Town after his release.)
1 July 2017	CF	(Wales)	Alex Samuel	Stevenage	Undisclosed	
1 July 2017	RB	(Wales)	Liam Shephard	Peterborough United	Released	(Note: Liam Shephard joined Peterborough United after his release.)
1 July 2017	LB	(France)	Franck Tabanou	Guingamp	Mutual consent	(Note: Franck Tabanou joined Guingamp after he left the club by mutual consent.)
1 July 2017	GK	(Germany)	Gerhard Tremmel	Retired	Released	(Note: Gerhard Tremmel retired from football after his release. He became Swansea's new European recruitment assistant.)
1 July 2017	GK	(England)	Josh Vickers	Lincoln City	Released	(Note: Josh Vickers joined Lincoln City after his release.)
11 July 2017	DM	(England)	Jack Cork	Burnley	Undisclosed	
28 July 2017	CB	(Wales)	Daniel Jefferies	Colchester United	Free	
3 August 2017	RW	(The Gambia)	Modou Barrow	Reading	Undisclosed	
16 August 2017	AM	(Iceland)	Gylfi Sigurðsson	Everton	Undisclosed	
24 August 2017	LB	(Scotland)	Stephen Kingsley	Hull City	Undisclosed	
31 August 2017	GK	(Australia)	Mark Birighitti	NAC Breda	Free	
31 August 2017	CF	(Spain)	Fernando Llorente	Tottenham Hotspur	Undisclosed	
5 January 2018	CM	(Wales)	Josh Sheehan	Newport County	Free	
31 January 2018	CB	(England)	Jack Bainbridge	Free agent	Released	
31 January 2018	RB	(France)	Anthony Brydges	Free agent	Released	
31 January 2018	LB	(Netherlands)	Tom Plezier	Free agent	Released	

=== Loans out ===
Start date	Position	Nationality	Name	To	Expiry date	Ref.
1 July 2017	LW	(Wales)	Daniel James	Shrewsbury Town	31 August 2017 (Note: On 31 August 2017, Daniel James mutually cancelled his loan spell at Shrewsbury Town.)	
4 July 2017	CF	(Spain)	Borja Bastón	Málaga	30 June 2018	
7 July 2017	CB	(Spain)	Jordi Amat	Real Betis	30 June 2018	
14 July 2017	RB	(Wales)	Connor Roberts	Middlesbrough	3 January 2018 (Note: On 3 January 2018, Connor Roberts was recalled from his loan spell at Middlesbrough.)	
14 July 2017	CB	(Wales)	Keston Davies	Yeovil Town	3 January 2018 (Note: On 3 January 2018, Keston Davies was recalled from his loan spell at Yeovil Town.)	
18 August 2017	CM	(England)	Matt Grimes	Northampton Town	30 June 2018	
31 August 2017	CF	(Scotland)	Botti Biabi	Hamilton Academical	31 December 2017	
1 September 2017	LM	(Ecuador)	Jefferson Montero	Getafe	30 June 2018	
6 January 2018	RB	(England)	Tyler Reid	Newport County	30 June 2018	
11 January 2018	CM	(Scotland)	Ryan Blair	Falkirk	30 June 2018	
25 January 2018	CM	(Scotland)	Jay Fulton	Wigan Athletic	30 June 2018	
29 January 2018	CM	(Scotland)	Adam King	Mansfield Town	30 June 2018	
30 January 2018	DM	(Spain)	Roque Mesa	Sevilla	30 June 2018	
30 January 2018	CB	(Wales)	Joe Rodon	Cheltenham Town	30 June 2018	
31 January 2018	CB	(England)	Jack Withers	Boston United	30 June 2018	
31 January 2018	GK	(Wales)	Lewis Thomas	Carmarthen Town	30 June 2018	
31 January 2018	FW	(Scotland)	Oli McBurnie	Barnsley	30 June 2018	
27 February 2018	LM	(Ecuador)	Jefferson Montero	Emelec (Note: On 27 February 2018, Jefferson Montero was sub-loaned from Getafe to Emelec for the rest of the season.)	30 June 2018	

=== New contracts ===
Date signed	Position	Nationality	Name	Contract length	Expiry date	Ref.
28 June 2017	CM	(England)	Leon Britton	1 year	June 2018	
4 July 2017	RB	(England)	Kyle Naughton	3 years	June 2020	
9 August 2017	CB	(England)	Kyle Bartley	4 years	June 2021	

== Pre-season friendlies ==
=== Friendlies ===
As of 2 June 2017, Swansea City have confirmed six pre-season friendlies against Philadelphia Union, Richmond Kickers, North Carolina in the United States, Birmingham City, Barnet and Sampdoria.

12 July 2017	Barnet	1–0	Swansea City	Canons Park
19:45 BST	Akinde 40'	Report		Stadium: The Hive Stadium

15 July 2017	Philadelphia Union	2–2	Swansea City	Chester, United States
19:00 EDT	Sapong 6' (pen.); Simpson 58'	Report	Bartley 28'; Ayew 40'	Stadium: Talen Energy Stadium

19 July 2017	Richmond Kickers	1–2	Swansea City	Richmond, United States
19:30 EDT	Tayou 69'	Report	McBurnie 40' (pen.); Abraham 80'	Stadium: City Stadium

22 July 2017	North Carolina	0–0	Swansea City	Cary, United States
19:30 EDT		Report		Stadium: WakeMed Soccer Park

29 July 2017	Birmingham City	0–2	Swansea City	Bordesley
15:00 BST		Report	Abraham 56'; Fer 75'	Stadium: St Andrew's

5 August 2017	Swansea City	4–0	Sampdoria	Swansea
17:15 BST	Fer 40'; Álvarez 46' (o.g.); Abraham 65'; Fernández 76'	Report		Stadium: Liberty Stadium

== Competitions ==
=== Overview ===
Competition	Record							
Competition	G	W	D	L	GF	GA	GD	Win %
Premier League	38	8	9	21	28	56	−28	21.05
FA Cup	7	3	3	1	13	6	+7	42.86
EFL Cup	3	2	0	1	6	3	+3	66.67
Total	48	13	12	23	47	63	−16	27.08

Updated to match played 13 May 2018
Source: Competitions

=== Premier League ===
==== League table ====
Pos	Team	Pld	W	D	L	GF	GA	GD	Pts	Qualification or relegation
16	Huddersfield Town	38	9	10	19	28	58	−30	37	
17	Southampton	38	7	15	16	37	56	−19	36	
18	Swansea City (R)	38	8	9	21	28	56	−28	33	Relegation to EFL Championship
19	Stoke City (R)	38	7	12	19	35	68	−33	33	Relegation to EFL Championship
20	West Bromwich Albion (R)	38	6	13	19	31	56	−25	31	Relegation to EFL Championship

Source: Premier League
Rules for classification: 1) Points; 2) Goal difference; 3) Goals scored. 4) Play-offs (only if needed to decide champion, teams for relegation or teams for UEFA competitions).
(R) Relegated

==== Results summary ====
Overall								Home						Away					
Pld	W	D	L	GF	GA	GD	Pts	W	D	L	GF	GA	GD	W	D	L	GF	GA	GD
38	8	9	21	28	56	−28	33	6	3	10	17	24	−7	2	6	11	11	32	−21

Last updated: 13 May 2018.
Source: Premier League

==== Results by matchday ====
Matchday	1	2	3	4	5	6	7	8	9	10	11	12	13	14	15	16	17	18	19	20	21	22	23	24	25	26	27	28	29	30	31	32	33	34	35	36	37	38
Ground	A	H	A	H	A	H	A	H	H	A	H	A	H	A	A	H	H	A	H	A	A	H	A	H	H	A	H	A	H	A	A	A	H	A	H	A	H	H
Result	D	L	W	L	D	L	L	W	L	L	L	L	D	L	L	W	L	L	D	L	W	L	D	W	W	D	W	L	W	D	L	D	D	L	L	L	L	L
Position	12	15	13	15	14	14	18	13	15	17	18	19	19	19	20	19	20	20	20	20	20	20	20	20	19	17	16	18	13	14	14	15	15	17	17	17	18	18

Updated to match(es) played on 13 May 2018. Source: BBC
A = Away; H = Home; W = Win; D = Draw; L = Loss

==== Matches ====
Win Draw Loss

On 14 June 2017, Swansea City's Premier League fixtures were announced.

12 August 2017 1	Southampton	0–0	Swansea City	Southampton
15:00 BST		Report		Stadium: St Mary's Stadium; Attendance: 31,447; Referee: Mike Jones

19 August 2017 2	Swansea City	0–4	Manchester United	Swansea
12:30 BST		Report	Bailly 45'; Lukaku 80'; Pogba 82'; Martial 84'	Stadium: Liberty Stadium; Attendance: 20,862; Referee: Jonathan Moss

26 August 2017 3	Crystal Palace	0–2	Swansea City	Selhurst, London
15:00 BST		Report	Abraham 44'; J. Ayew 48'	Stadium: Selhurst Park; Attendance: 23,477; Referee: Andre Marriner

10 September 2017 4	Swansea City	0–1	Newcastle United	Swansea
16:00 BST		Report	Lascelles 76'	Stadium: Liberty Stadium; Attendance: 20,872; Referee: Mike Jones

16 September 2017 5	Tottenham Hotspur	0–0	Swansea City	Wembley
17:30 BST		Report		Stadium: Wembley Stadium; Attendance: 65,366; Referee: Mike Dean

23 September 2017 6	Swansea City	1–2	Watford	Swansea
15:00 BST	Abraham 56'	Report	Gray 13'; Richarlison 90'	Stadium: Liberty Stadium; Attendance: 20,372; Referee: Lee Mason

30 September 2017 7	West Ham United	1–0	Swansea City	Stratford, London
15:00 BST	Sakho 90'	Report		Stadium: London Stadium; Attendance: 56,922; Referee: Roger East

14 October 2017 8	Swansea City	2–0	Huddersfield Town	Swansea
15:00 BST	Abraham 42', 48'	Report		Stadium: Liberty Stadium; Attendance: 20,657; Referee: Paul Tierney

21 October 2017 9	Swansea City	1–2	Leicester City	Swansea
16:00 BST	Mawson 56'	Report	Fernández 24' (o.g.); Okazaki 49'	Stadium: Liberty Stadium; Attendance: 20,521; Referee: Michael Oliver

28 October 2017 10	Arsenal	2–1	Swansea City	Holloway, London
15:00 BST	Kolašinac 51'; Ramsey 58'	Report	Clucas 22'	Stadium: Emirates Stadium; Attendance: 59,493; Referee: Lee Mason

4 November 2017 11	Swansea City	0–1	Brighton & Hove Albion	Swansea
15:00 GMT		Report	Murray 29'	Stadium: Liberty Stadium; Attendance: 20,822; Referee: Mike Dean

18 November 2017 12	Burnley	2–0	Swansea City	Burnley
15:00 GMT	Cork 29'; Barnes 40'	Report		Stadium: Turf Moor; Attendance: 18,895; Referee: Martin Atkinson

25 November 2017 13	Swansea City	0–0	AFC Bournemouth	Swansea
15:00 GMT		Report		Stadium: Liberty Stadium; Attendance: 20,228; Referee: Stuart Attwell

29 November 2017 14	Chelsea	1–0	Swansea City	Fulham
19:45 GMT	Rüdiger 55'	Report		Stadium: Stamford Bridge; Attendance: 41,365; Referee: Neil Swarbrick

2 December 2017 15	Stoke City	2–1	Swansea City	Stoke-on-Trent
15:00 GMT	Shaqiri 36'; Diouf 40'	Report	Bony 3'	Stadium: Britannia Stadium; Attendance: 28,261; Referee: Craig Pawson

9 December 2017 16	Swansea City	1–0	West Bromwich Albion	Swansea
15:00 GMT	Bony 81'	Report		Stadium: Liberty Stadium; Attendance: 19,580; Referee: Mike Dean

13 December 2017 17	Swansea City	0–4	Manchester City	Swansea
19:45 GMT		Report	D. Silva 27', 52'; De Bruyne 34'; Agüero 85'	Stadium: Liberty Stadium; Attendance: 20,870; Referee: Anthony Taylor

18 December 2017 18	Everton	3–1	Swansea City	Liverpool
20:00 GMT	Calvert-Lewin 45+2'; Sigurðsson 64'; Rooney 73' (pen.)	Report	Fer 35'	Stadium: Goodison Park; Attendance: 37,580; Referee: Jonathan Moss

23 December 2017 19	Swansea City	1–1	Crystal Palace	Swansea
15:00 GMT	J. Ayew 77'	Report	Milivojević 59' (pen.)	Stadium: Liberty Stadium; Attendance: 20,354; Referee: Craig Pawson

26 December 2017 20	Liverpool	5–0	Swansea City	Liverpool
17:30 GMT	Coutinho 6'; Firmino 52', 66'; Alexander-Arnold 65'; Oxlade-Chamberlain 82'	Report		Stadium: Anfield; Attendance: 52,850; Referee: Kevin Friend

30 December 2017 21	Watford	1–2	Swansea City	Watford
15:00 GMT	Carrillo 11'	Report	J. Ayew 86'; Narsingh 90'	Stadium: Vicarage Road; Attendance: 20,002; Referee: Martin Atkinson

2 January 2018 22	Swansea City	0–2	Tottenham Hotspur	Swansea
19:45 GMT		Report	Llorente 12'; Alli 89'	Stadium: Liberty Stadium; Attendance: 20,615; Referee: Bobby Madley

13 January 2018 23	Newcastle United	1–1	Swansea City	Newcastle upon Tyne
15:00 GMT	Joselu 68'	Report	J. Ayew 60'	Stadium: St James' Park; Attendance: 51,444; Referee: Graham Scott

22 January 2018 24	Swansea City	1–0	Liverpool	Swansea
20:00 GMT	Mawson 40'	Report		Stadium: Liberty Stadium; Attendance: 20,886; Referee: Neil Swarbrick

30 January 2018 25	Swansea City	3–1	Arsenal	Swansea
19:45 GMT	Clucas 34', 86'; J. Ayew 61'	Report	Monreal 33'	Stadium: Liberty Stadium; Attendance: 20,819; Referee: Lee Mason

3 February 2018 26	Leicester City	1–1	Swansea City	Leicester
15:00 GMT	Vardy 17'	Report	Fernández 53'	Stadium: King Power Stadium; Attendance: 31,179; Referee: Anthony Taylor

10 February 2018 27	Swansea City	1–0	Burnley	Swansea
15:00 GMT	Ki 81'	Report		Stadium: Liberty Stadium; Attendance: 20,176; Referee: Andre Marriner

24 February 2018 28	Brighton & Hove Albion	4–1	Swansea City	Falmer
15:00 GMT	Murray 18' (pen.), 69'; Knockaert 73'; Locadia 90'	Report	Dunk 85' (o.g.)	Stadium: Falmer Stadium; Attendance: 30,523; Referee: Mike Dean

3 March 2018 29	Swansea City	4–1	West Ham United	Swansea
15:00 GMT	Ki 8'; Van der Hoorn 32'; King 48'; J. Ayew 63' (pen.)	Report	Antonio 79'	Stadium: Liberty Stadium; Attendance: 20,829; Referee: Martin Atkinson

10 March 2018 30	Huddersfield Town	0–0	Swansea City	Huddersfield
15:00 GMT		Report	J. Ayew (red card) 11'	Stadium: Kirklees Stadium; Attendance: 23,567; Referee: Michael Oliver

31 March 2018 31	Manchester United	2–0	Swansea City	Manchester
15:00 BST	Lukaku 5'; Sánchez 20'	Report		Stadium: Old Trafford; Attendance: 75,038; Referee: Bobby Madley

7 April 2018 32	West Bromwich Albion	1–1	Swansea City	West Bromwich
15:00 BST	Rodriguez 54'	Report	Abraham 75'	Stadium: The Hawthorns; Attendance: 23,297; Referee: Roger East

14 April 2018 33	Swansea City	1–1	Everton	Swansea
15:00 BST	J. Ayew (yellow card) 55', (goal) 71'	Report	Naughton 43' (o.g.)	Stadium: Liberty Stadium; Attendance: 20,933; Referee: Lee Mason

22 April 2018 34	Manchester City	5–0	Swansea City	Manchester
16:30 BST	D. Silva 12'; Sterling 16'; De Bruyne 54'; B. Silva 64'; Jesus 88'	Report		Stadium: City of Manchester Stadium; Attendance: 54,387; Referee: Craig Pawson

28 April 2018 35	Swansea City	0–1	Chelsea	Swansea
17:30 BST		Report	Fàbregas 4'	Stadium: Liberty Stadium; Attendance: 20,900; Referee: Jonathan Moss

5 May 2018 36	AFC Bournemouth	1–0	Swansea City	Bournemouth
15:00 BST	Fraser 37'	Report		Stadium: Dean Court; Attendance: 10,820; Referee: Kevin Friend

8 May 2018 37	Swansea City	0–1	Southampton	Swansea
19:45 BST		Report	Gabbiadini 72'	Stadium: Liberty Stadium; Attendance: 20,858; Referee: Michael Oliver

13 May 2018 38	Swansea City	1–2	Stoke City	Swansea
15:00 BST	King 14'	Report	Ndiaye 31'; Crouch 41'	Stadium: Liberty Stadium; Attendance: 20,673; Referee: Anthony Taylor

=== FA Cup ===
Win Draw Loss

Swansea City joined the competition in the third round and were drawn away to Wolverhampton Wanderers.

6 January 2018 3rd round	Wolverhampton Wanderers	0–0	Swansea City	Wolverhampton
15:00 GMT		Report		Stadium: Molineux Stadium; Attendance: 22,976; Referee: Anthony Taylor

17 January 2018 3rd round replay	Swansea City	2–1	Wolverhampton Wanderers	Swansea
19:45 GMT	J. Ayew 11'; Bony 69'	Report	Jota 66'	Stadium: Liberty Stadium; Attendance: 8,294; Referee: Chris Kavanagh

27 January 2018 4th round	Notts County	1–1	Swansea City	Nottingham
15:00 GMT	Stead 62'	Report	Narsingh 45'	Stadium: Meadow Lane; Attendance: 9,802; Referee: Mike Jones

6 February 2018 4th round replay	Swansea City	8–1	Notts County	Swansea
20:05 GMT	Abraham 18', 45+3'; Dyer 20', 30'; Naughton 53'; Routledge 57'; Carroll 65'; James 82'	Report	Husin 35'	Stadium: Liberty Stadium; Attendance: 7,822; Referee: Martin Atkinson

17 February 2018 5th round	Sheffield Wednesday	0–0	Swansea City	Sheffield
12:30 GMT		Report		Stadium: Hillsborough Stadium; Attendance: 19,427; Referee: Paul Tierney

27 February 2018 5th round replay	Swansea City	2–0	Sheffield Wednesday	Swansea
20:05 GMT	J. Ayew 55'; Dyer 80'	Report		Stadium: Liberty Stadium; Attendance: 8,198; Referee: Stuart Attwell

17 March 2018 Quarter-finals	Swansea City	0–3	Tottenham Hotspur	Swansea
12:15 GMT		Report	Eriksen 11', 62'; Lamela 45+1'	Stadium: Liberty Stadium; Attendance: 17,498; Referee: Kevin Friend

=== EFL Cup ===
Swansea City were given another away trip in the third round against Reading.

Win Draw Loss

22 August 2017 2nd round	Milton Keynes Dons	1–4	Swansea City	Milton Keynes
19:45 BST	Seager 17'	Report	Fer 19', 60'; Abraham 71'; J. Ayew 86'	Stadium: Stadium mk Attendance: Robert Jones; Referee: 5,162

19 September 2017 3rd round	Reading	0–2	Swansea City	Reading
20:00 BST		Report	Mawson 52'; J. Ayew 83'	Stadium: Madejski Stadium; Attendance: 8,729; Referee: Andy Davies

24 October 2017 4th round	Swansea City	0–2	Manchester United	Swansea
19:45 BST		Report	Lingard 21', 59'	Stadium: Liberty Stadium; Attendance: 20,083; Referee: Bobby Madley

== Statistics ==
=== Appearances, goals, and cards ===
Last updated on 13 May 2018

No.	Pos	Player	Premier League			FA Cup			EFL Cup			Total			Discipline	
No.	Pos	Player	Starts	Sub	Goals	Starts	Sub	Goals	Starts	Sub	Goals	Starts	Sub	Goals	Booked	Sent off (straight red)
1	GK	(Poland) Łukasz Fabiański	38	0	0	–	–	–	–	–	–	30	0	0	–	–
2	FW	(Ivory Coast) Wilfried Bony	8	7	2	3	0	1	1	0	0	12	7	3	3	–
4	MF	(South Korea) Ki Sung-yueng	21	4	2	3	3	0	–	–	–	18	6	2	3	–
5	DF	(Netherlands) Mike van der Hoorn	24	0	1	6	0	0	3	0	0	27	0	1	5	–
6	DF	(England) Alfie Mawson	38	0	2	3	0	0	2	1	1	35	1	3	3	–
7	MF	(England) Leon Britton	4	1	0	0	1	0	–	–	–	4	1	0	1	–
8	FW	(Netherlands) Leroy Fer	15	5	1	3	0	0	2	1	2	20	6	3	7	–
10	FW	(England) Tammy Abraham	15	15	5	5	0	2	1	2	1	20	12	8	–	–
11	MF	(Netherlands) Luciano Narsingh	5	13	1	4	1	1	1	1	0	9	13	2	–	–
12	MF	(England) Nathan Dyer	16	9	0	4	2	3	–	–	–	17	7	3	2	–
13	GK	(Sweden) Kristoffer Nordfeldt	–	–	–	7	0	0	3	0	0	10	0	0	1	–
14	MF	(England) Tom Carroll	27	9	0	6	1	1	1	0	0	30	6	1	4	–
15	MF	(England) Wayne Routledge	4	12	0	4	1	1	2	0	0	9	10	1	1	–
16	DF	(Sweden) Martin Olsson	36	0	0	3	1	0	3	0	0	34	1	0	7	–
17	MF	(England) Sam Clucas	24	5	3	3	3	0	1	0	0	23	7	3	3	–
18	FW	(Ghana) Jordan Ayew	33	3	7	1	4	2	2	1	2	30	8	11	1	1
19	FW	(Ghana) André Ayew	10	2	0	–	–	–	–	–	–	2	2	0	3	–
22	DF	(Spain) Àngel Rangel	2	2	0	–	–	–	3	0	0	4	2	0	1	–
24	MF	(Wales) Andy King	9	2	3	–	–	–	–	–	–	6	1	2	1	–
25	GK	(Netherlands) Erwin Mulder	–	–	–	–	–	–	–	–	–	–	–	–	–	–
26	DF	(England) Kyle Naughton	34	0	0	4	0	1	0	1	0	32	1	1	1	–
27	DF	(England) Kyle Bartley	2	2	0	6	0	0	1	0	0	9	1	0	2	–
33	DF	(Argentina) Federico Fernández	29	0	1	3	0	0	0	1	0	27	1	1	5	–
35	MF	(Portugal) Renato Sanches	9	3	0	2	0	0	1	0	0	11	4	0	2	–
38	MF	(Sweden) Adnan Marić	–	–	–	0	1	0	–	–	–	0	1	0	–	–
42	MF	(Wales) Daniel James	–	–	–	0	1	1	–	–	–	0	1	1	–	–
52	DF	(Wales) Connor Roberts	4	1	0	6	1	0	–	–	–	6	2	0	–	–
Players currently away on loan
51	MF	(Spain) Roque Mesa	9	2	0	1	1	0	3	0	0	13	3	0	3	–
56	MF	(Scotland) Jay Fulton	0	2	0	–	–	–	1	0	0	1	2	0	1	–
62	FW	(Scotland) Oli McBurnie	2	8	0	–	–	–	1	0	0	3	8	0	–	–
