= Ghana Player of the Year =

Annual award in Ghana

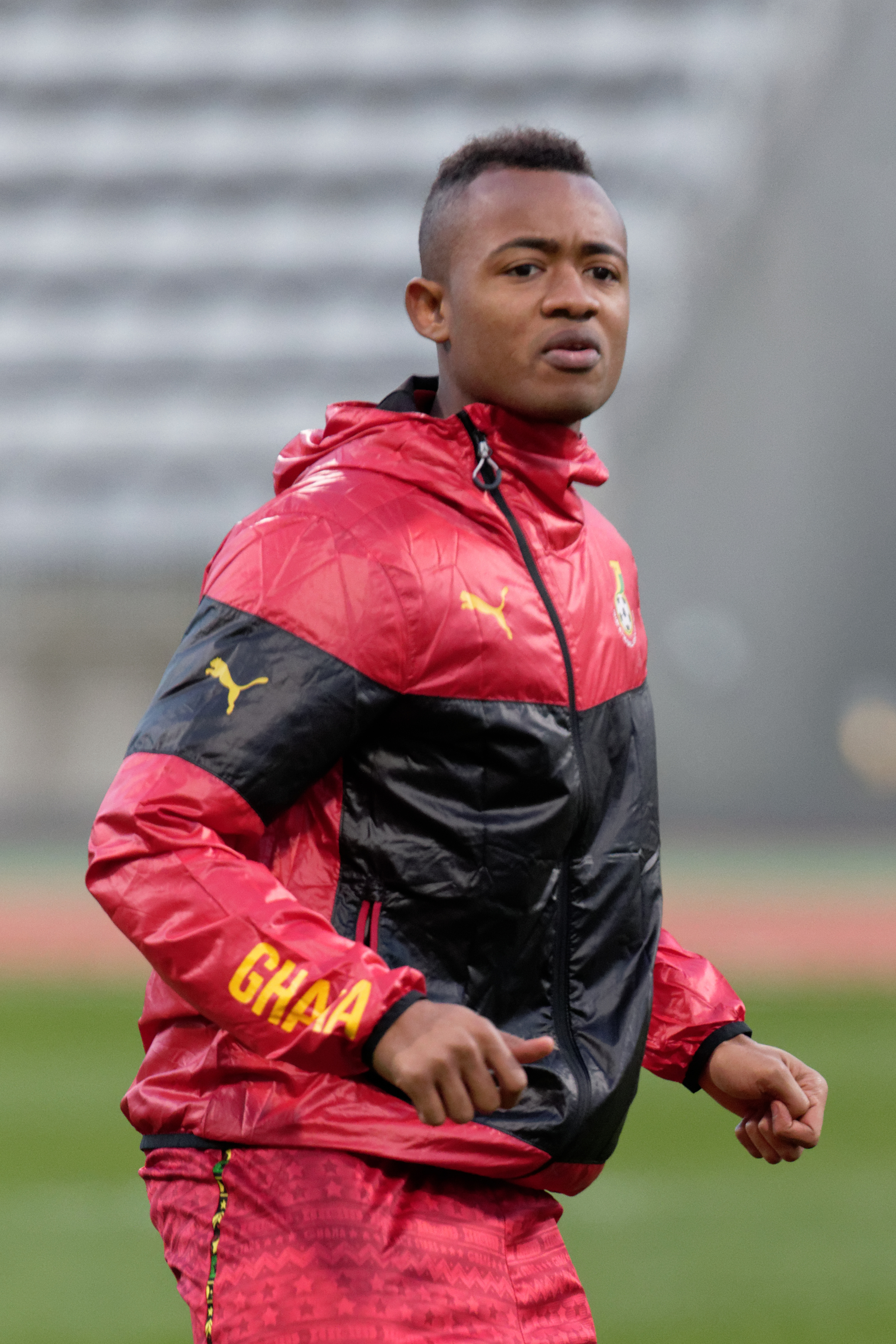
- 2020 winner Jordan Ayew
- Sport: Association football
- Location: Accra International Conference Centre
- Country: Republic of Ghana
- Presented by: Sport Writers Association of Ghana (SWAG)

History
- First award: 1975
- Editions: 29
- First winner: Mohammed Ahmed Polo (1975)
- Most wins: Samuel Kuffour (3)
- Most recent: Daniel Afriyie (2022, home based); Mohammed Kudus (2022, foreign)

The Ghana Player of the Year (or Ghanaian Footballer of the Year) is an annual award from Football Association of Ghana, govern in recognition of excellence to the best Ghanaian professional association footballer of the year.

The title has been awarded yearly in Ghana since 1975. The award is determined annually by the members of the Sport Writers Association of Ghana (SWAG), with additional votes from the Ghana Premier League team captains and coaches, in collaboration with Goal.com's corporate subdivision of Perform Group, and is published by the Ghana Football Association (GFA). All Ghanaian professional association footballers all eligible. The award has been presented on 28 occasions as of 2020.

The most successful player of the award is Samuel Kuffour, who was chosen as Ghana Player of the Year three times. Asamoah Gyan, André Ayew, Stephen Appiah, Kwadwo Asamoah and Thomas Partey have each won the award twice, the latter three all in consecutive years.

== Winners ==
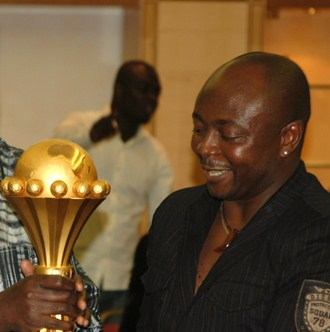
Abedi Pele was the winner of the award in 1993, and was also named African Footballer of the Year three times

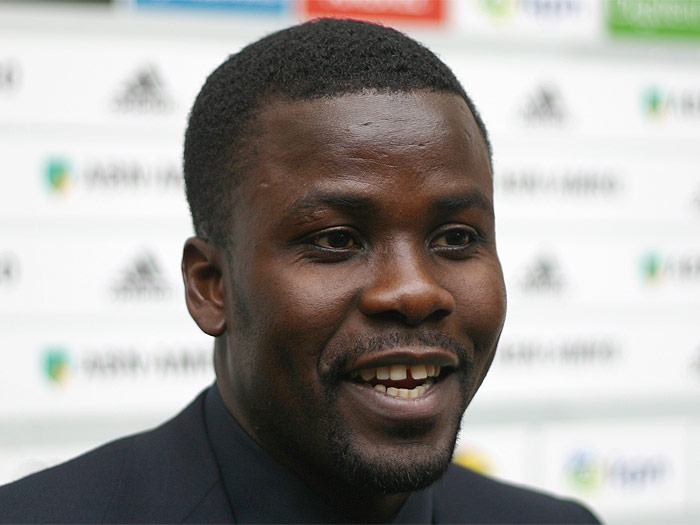
Samuel Kuffour has won the most awards, with three titles in 1998, 1999 and 2001

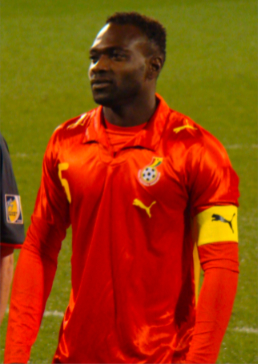
John Mensah was the recipient of the award in 2006

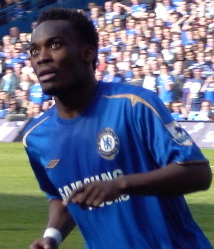
Michael Essien won the award in 2007

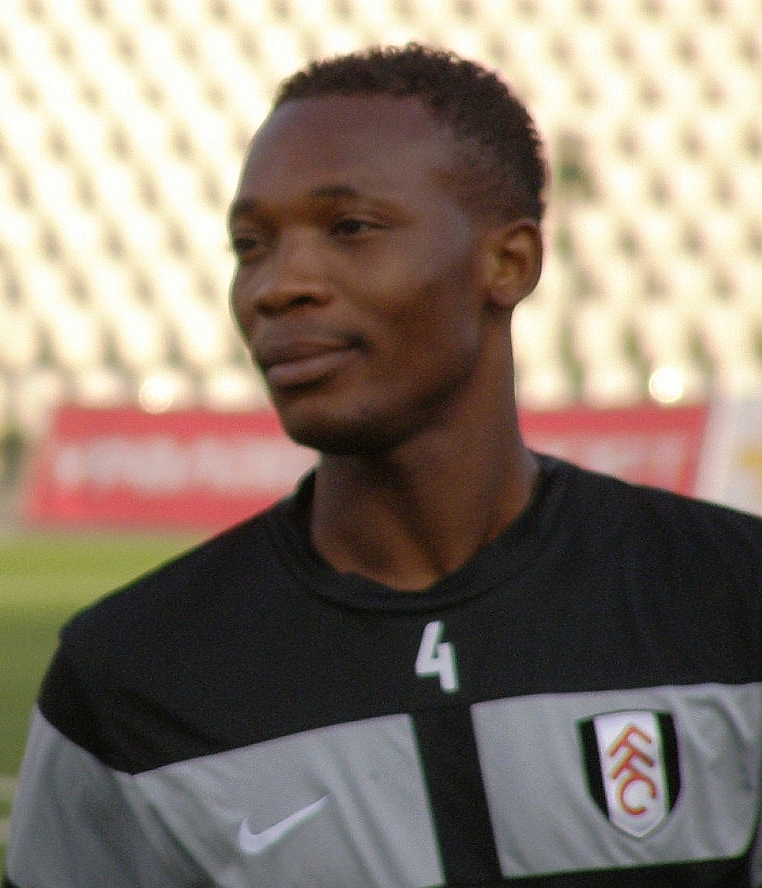
John Paintsil was the recipient of the award in 2008

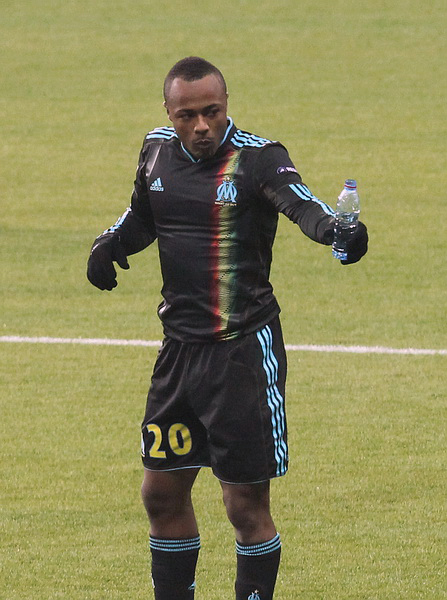
André Ayew, winner of the award in 2011

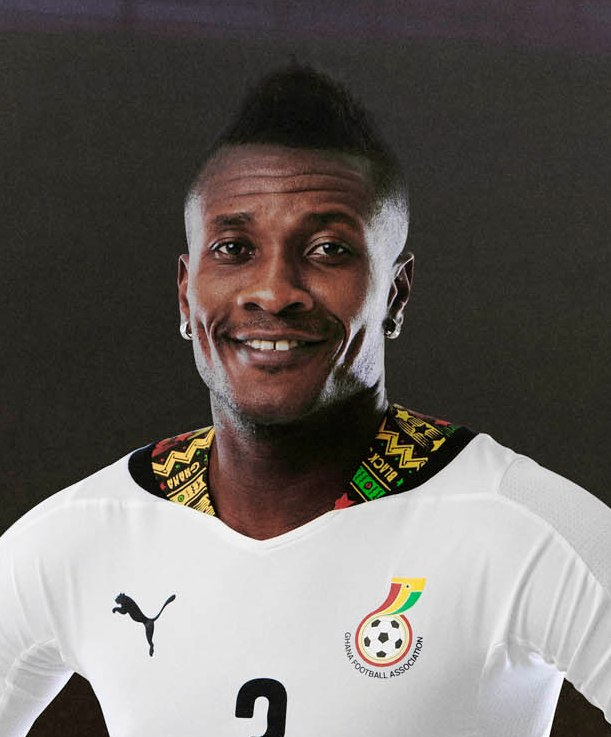
Asamoah Gyan won the award twice 2010 and 2013

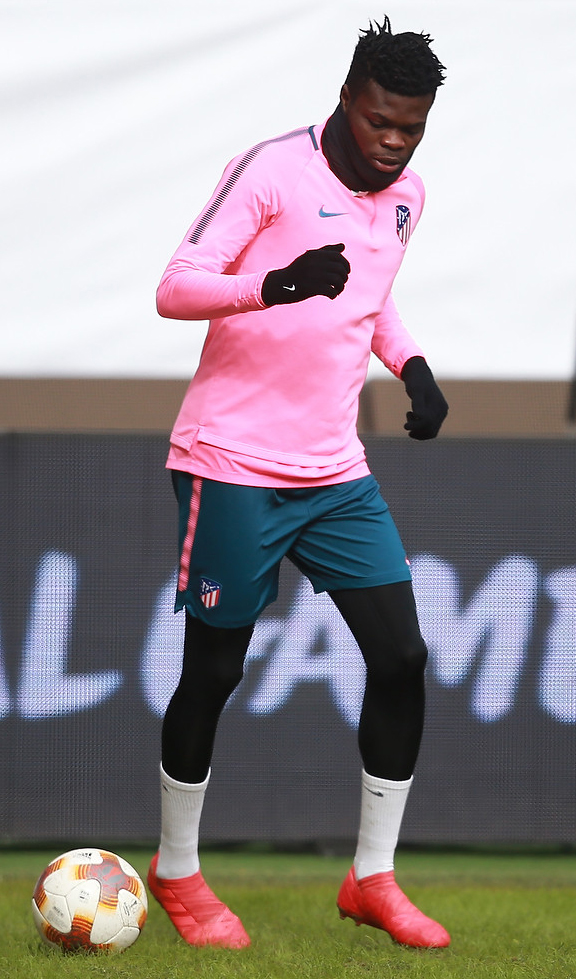
Thomas Partey of Atlético Madrid was the first winner that was playing in La Liga, earning two straight awards in 2018 and 2019

Year	Winner	Club	Position
1975	Mohammed Ahmed Polo	(Ghana) Hearts of Oak	Forward
1978	Karim Abdul Razak	(Ghana) Asante Kotoko	Midfielder
1979	John Nketia Yawson	(Ghana) Hearts of Oak	Midfielder
1980	Francis Kumi	(Ghana) Asante Kotoko	Forward
1984	Joe Odoi	(Ghana) Hearts of Oak	Defender
1993	Abedi Pele	(France) Marseille	Forward
1997	Tony Yeboah	(Germany) Hamburger SV	Forward
1998	Samuel Kuffour	(Germany) Bayern Munich	Defender
1999	Samuel Kuffour	(Germany) Bayern Munich	Defender
2000	Emmanuel Osei Kuffour	(Ghana) Hearts of Oak	Midfielder
2001	Samuel Kuffour	(Germany) Bayern Munich	Defender
2002	Charles Asampong	(Ghana) Hearts of Oak	Forward
2003	Aziz Ansah	(Ghana) Asante Kotoko	Defender
2004	Stephen Appiah	(Italy) Juventus	Midfielder
2005	Stephen Appiah	(Italy) Juventus	Midfielder
2006	John Mensah	(France) Rennes	Defender
2007	Michael Essien	(England) Chelsea	Midfielder
2008	John Paintsil	(England) Fulham	Defender
2009	Dominic Adiyiah	(Italy) Milan	Forward
2010	Asamoah Gyan	(England) Sunderland	Forward
2011	André Ayew	(France) Marseille	Forward
2012	Kwadwo Asamoah	(Italy) Juventus	Midfielder
2013	Asamoah Gyan	(United Arab Emirates) Al Ain	Forward
2014	Harrison Afful	(Tunisia) Espérance de Tunis	Defender
2015	André Ayew	(Wales) Swansea City	Forward
2016	Solomon Asante	(Democratic Republic of the Congo) TP Mazembe	Forward
2017	Thomas Partey	(Spain) Atlético Madrid	Midfielder
2018	Thomas Partey	(Spain) Atlético Madrid	Midfielder
2020 (Note: Due to COVID-19 pandemic the award covered the both 2019 and 2020)	Jordan Ayew	(England) Crystal Palace	Forward

Footballer of the Year (Home Based)

Year	Winner	Club	Position
2021	Daniel Afriyie	(Ghana) Hearts of Oak	Forward
2022	Daniel Afriyie	(Ghana) Hearts of Oak	Forward

Footballer of the Year (Foreign)

Year	Winner	Club	Position
2021	Mohammed Kudus	(Netherlands) Ajax	Midfielder
2022	Mohammed Kudus	(Netherlands) Ajax	Midfielder

== Breakdown of winners ==
=== Number of wins by player ===
Rank	Name	Number of wins	Winning years
1	Samuel Kuffour	3	1998, 1999, 2001
2	Stephen Appiah	2	2004, 2005
2	Asamoah Gyan	2	2010, 2013
2	André Ayew	2	2011, 2015
2	Thomas Partey	2	2017, 2018
6	Kwadwo Asamoah	1	2012
6	Mohammed Ahmed Polo	1	1975
6	Karim Abdul Razak	1	1978
6	John Nketia Yawson	1	1979
6	Francis Kumi	1	1980
6	Joe Odoi	1	1984
6	Abedi Pele	1	1993
6	Tony Yeboah	1	1997
6	Emmanuel Osei Kuffour	1	2000
6	Charles Asampong	1	2002
6	Aziz Ansah	1	2003
6	John Mensah	1	2006
6	Michael Essien	1	2007
6	John Paintsil	1	2008
6	Dominic Adiyiah	1	2009
6	Harrison Afful	1	2014
6	Solomon Asante	1	2016
6	Jordan Ayew	1	2020

=== Number of wins by league ===
Rank	League	Number of wins	Winning years
1	Ghana Premier League	8	1975, 1978, 1979, 1980, 1984, 2000, 2002, 2003
2	(England) Premier League	5	2007, 2008, 2010, 2015, 2020
3	(Italy) Serie A	4	2004, 2005, 2009, 2012
3	(Germany) Bundesliga	4	1997, 1998, 1999, 2001
5	(France) Ligue 1	3	1993, 2006, 2011
6	(Spain) La Liga	2	2017, 2018
7	(Democratic Republic of the Congo) Linafoot	1	2016
7	(United Arab Emirates) UAE Pro League	1	2013
7	(Tunisia) Ligue Professionnelle 1	1	2014

=== Number of wins by club ===
Rank	Club	Number of wins	Winning years
1	(Ghana) Hearts of Oak	5	1975, 1979, 1984, 2000, 2002
2	(Italy) Juventus	4	2004, 2005, 2012, 2013
3	(Ghana) Asante Kotoko	3	1978, 1980, 2003
3	(Germany) Bayern Munich	3	1998, 1999, 2001
5	(France) Marseille	2	1993, 2011
5	(Spain) Atlético Madrid	2	2018, 2019
7	(Germany) Hamburger SV	1	1997
7	(France) Rennes	1	2006
7	(England) Chelsea	1	2007
7	(England) Fulham	1	2008
7	(Italy) Milan	1	2009
7	(England) Sunderland	1	2010
7	(United Arab Emirates) Al Ain	1	2014
7	(Tunisia) Espérance de Tunis	1	2015
7	(Wales) Swansea City	1	2016
7	(Democratic Republic of the Congo) TP Mazembe	1	2017
7	(England) Crystal Palace	1	2020

=== Number of wins by position ===
Rank	Position	Number of wins
1	Forward	12
2	Midfielder	10
3	Defender	6
4	Goalkeeper	0
