= Huw Jenkins (Welsh businessman) =

Welsh Businessman

Huw Jenkins OBE
- Born: Huw Morgan Jenkins; 9 March 1963 (age 63); Jersey Marine, Wales
- Years active: 2002–
- Known for: Former chairman of Swansea City A.F.C. Majority shareholder and Chairman of Newport County A.F.C.

Huw Morgan Jenkins OBE (born 9 March 1963) is a Welsh businessman. Jenkins is the majority shareholder and Chairman of Newport County A.F.C.. He is the former chairman of Swansea City A.F.C., overseeing the club's rise from English football's fourth tier to the Premier League. In 2015, he was appointed an Officer of the Order of the British Empire (OBE) for services to Sport in Wales.

== Early life ==
Jenkins was born and grew up in Jersey Marine, Wales. He was a youth goalkeeper for Afan Nedd Schools, Llandarcy and Afan Lido at the Welsh League level. He played in the youth systems of Bristol Rovers and Swansea City and earned one Boys Club of Wales cap playing against Scotland, at 14.

== Career before football ==
Jenkins was a builder and builder's merchant by trade, serving as the Managing Director of Gowerton Concrete Products and Casey's, a construction company, among several other firms within the construction industry in South West Wales.

== Swansea City ==
Jenkins was chairman, shareholder and chief executive of Swansea City A.F.C. Being part of a consortium that "ousted" then-owner Tony Petty and with the backing of the Swansea City's Supporters Trust, he was appointed chairman in January 2002, a position that he took, as he states, because, "I was the dullest one."

During his chairmanship, the club's finances turned to profitable and the club progressed on through to the Premier League. In 2013, Swansea City won the League Cup. It was the first time the League Cup had been won by a non-English club.

During the 2013–14 season, Jenkins sacked manager Michael Laudrup in February 2014 and replaced him with former player Garry Monk, stating, "we had to remove the constant uncertainty surrounding the club and Michael's long-term future with us." Laudrup, in his first season with the club, had led Swansea to 9th place in the Premier League and to "League Cup glory, their first ever major trophy," while taking them to next season's Europa League campaign, a campaign crowned with a 3–0 away win over Spanish top-flight side Valencia in September 2013. After his sacking, the club and Laudrup reached an out-of-court settlement whose details were not disclosed.

In April 2016, a "controlling" portion of the club's shares were sold to American investors. At the end of the 2017–18 season, the club was relegated to the second tier.

On 2 February 2019, Jenkins resigned as chairman amid increasing criticism over the club's sale to the American consortium in 2016 and the club's subsequent relegation from the Premier League. He stated, "...the current atmosphere within the football club on and off the football field saddens me very much and I find it very difficult to fight on in a football club I love but can no longer control."

== Charlton Athletic ==
Towards the end of May 2020, it was reported that Jenkins was an interested party in buying Charlton Athletic F.C. after the club spent a turbulent few months under the ownership of East Street Investments however this fell through and did not come to fruition.

== Cobalt Sports Management ==
In October 2022 Jenkins joined professional footballers agency Cobalt Sports Management.

== Newport County ==
In October 2023 Newport County Supporters Trust members voted in favour of selling a controlling interest 52% of shares in EFL League Two club Newport County A.F.C. to Huw Jenkins, subject to EFL approval. The takeover was confirmed as completed by EFL and Newport County on 24 January 2024.

== Awards ==
In 2012, Jenkins was awarded an Honorary Doctor of Laws degree (LLD) by Swansea University, "in recognition of his lifelong contribution to football and for his role in taking Swansea City A.F.C. through to the Premier League."

In the 2015 Birthday Honours, Jenkins was appointed an Officer of the Order of the British Empire (OBE) "for services to Sport in Wales."

In November 2015, Huw won 'FC Business Football CEO of the Year' at the 4th annual Football Business Awards by the writers and editors of the FB Business magazine.
