= André Ayew =

Footballer (born 1989)

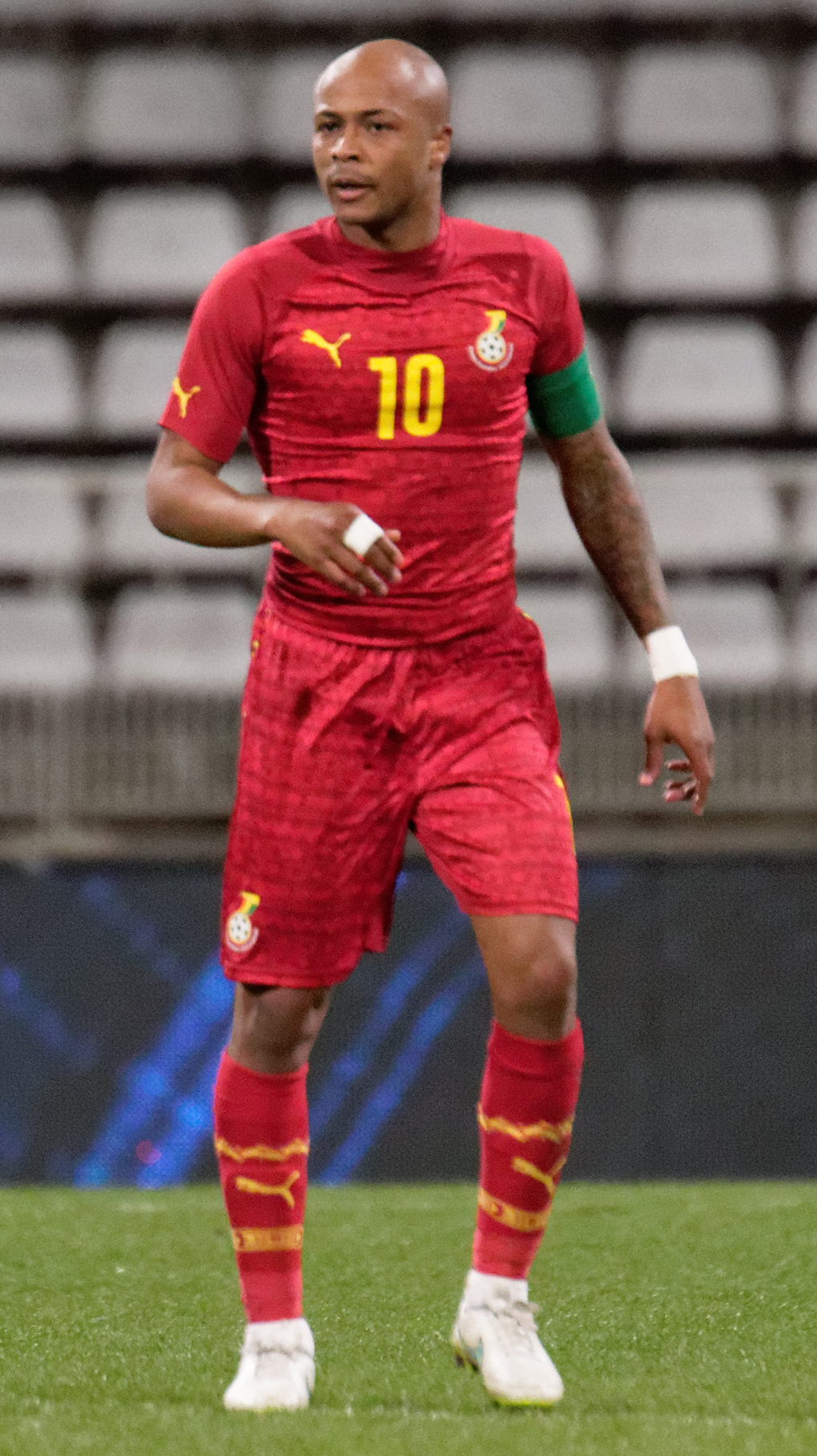
- Ayew with Ghana in 2015

Personal information
- Full name: André Morgan Rami Ayew
- Date of birth: 17 December 1989 (age 36)
- Place of birth: Seclin, France
- Height: 1.75 m (5 ft 9 in)
- Positions: Winger; forward

Youth career
- 1996–1998: 1860 Munich
- 1999–2006: Nania
- 2006–2007: Marseille

Senior career*
Years	Team	Apps	(Gls)
2007–2015	Marseille	160	(44)
2008–2009	→ Lorient (loan)	22	(3)
2009–2010	→ Arles-Avignon (loan)	25	(4)
2015–2016	Swansea City	34	(12)
2016–2018	West Ham United	43	(9)
2018–2021	Swansea City	99	(31)
2018–2019	→ Fenerbahçe (loan)	29	(5)
2021–2023	Al Sadd	30	(18)
2023	Nottingham Forest	13	(0)
2023–2025	Le Havre	46	(9)
2026	NAC Breda	17	(1)

International career^{‡}
2009	Ghana U20	12	(4)
2007–2024	Ghana	120	(24)
Medal record
Representing Ghana
Men's football
Africa Cup of Nations
Runner-up	2010 Angola
Runner-up	2015 Equatorial Guinea
Third place	2008 Ghana
FIFA U-20 World Cup
Winner	2009 Egypt
Africa U-20 Cup of Nations
Winner	2009 Rwanda
- * Club domestic league appearances and goals as of 21 May 2026 ‡ National team caps and goals as of 26 March 2024 (UTC)

André Morgan Rami Ayew (/ˈɑːjuː/; born 17 December 1989), also known as Dede Ayew in Ghana, is a professional footballer who plays as a winger or forward.

Ayew began his career in Germany, playing for 1860 Munich, while debuting for the club at age seven. In 2006, he signed with his father's former club, Marseille, and spent two seasons in the club's youth academy before making his debut in the 2007–08 season. Ayew spent the following two seasons on loan with Lorient and Arles-Avignon, helping the latter team earn promotion to Ligue 1 for the first time. In 2010, he returned to Marseille and became an integral part of the first team under manager Didier Deschamps, making over 200 appearances and winning consecutive Trophée des Champions and Coupe de la Ligues in both 2010 and 2011.

Born in France, Ayew has been a full international for Ghana since 2008 and has earned 120 caps. At youth level, he starred for and captained the under-20 team that won both the 2009 African Youth Championship and the 2009 FIFA U-20 World Cup. He has played in three FIFA World Cups (2010, 2014 and 2022), as well as eight Africa Cup of Nations (2008, 2010, 2012, 2015, 2017, 2019, 2021 and 2023), helping them finish runners-up in 2010 and 2015, and was top goalscorer at the latter tournament.

Ayew is the second-born son of three-time African Footballer of the Year and FIFA 100 member Abedi "Pele" Ayew and has two brothers, Ibrahim and Jordan, who also are professional footballers. In 2011, Ayew was named the BBC African Footballer of the Year and Ghanaian Footballer of the Year.

== Club career ==
=== Early career ===
Ayew began his career with 1860 Munich, where his father played. At the age of ten, Ayew was playing for Nania, where his father is club chairman, in Accra, Ghana. After four years of plying his trade in the club's youth academy, he was promoted to the team's senior squad at the age of 14. Despite being on the senior team, he still participated in youth-sanctioned events, such as the 2004 edition of the Altstetten U-19 Tournament, in which he was named one of the tournament's most famous players. Ayew played professional football at Nania for two seasons before departing the club and returning to France to play for his father's former club Marseille. Ayew joined the club on an aspirant ("trainee") contract and, upon his arrival, was put into the club's youth system and placed onto Marseille's first professional contract, agreeing to a three-year deal. He was officially promoted to the senior team and assigned the squad number 29 shirt.

=== Marseille ===
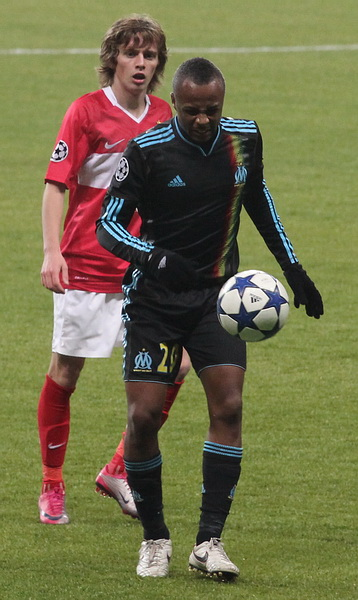
Ayew playing with Marseille in the 2010–2011 UEFA Champions League

Ayew made his professional debut for Marseille on 15 August 2007 in a league match against Valenciennes, coming on as a substitute for Modeste M'bami in the 89th minute. Marseille lost the match 2–1. On 6 November, he made his UEFA Champions League debut against Portuguese champions Porto at the Estádio do Dragão, playing on the left wing in place of Bolo Zenden. Ayew played 77 minutes before being substituted out as Marseille were defeated 2–1. Ayew earned praise from the media for his performance of containing Porto right-back José Bosingwa. Five days later, Ayew earned his first league start against Lyon at the Stade de Gerland. Ayew again featured in the team as Marseille pulled off a 2–1 victory. Ayew finished the season with 13 total appearances, nine in league play and two in cup play, in addition to two Champions League appearances. Ayew's first season with the club drew the attention of Premier League club Arsenal, who reportedly offered Marseille €6 million for the player. Marseille, however, denied the offer.

==== Loan moves ====
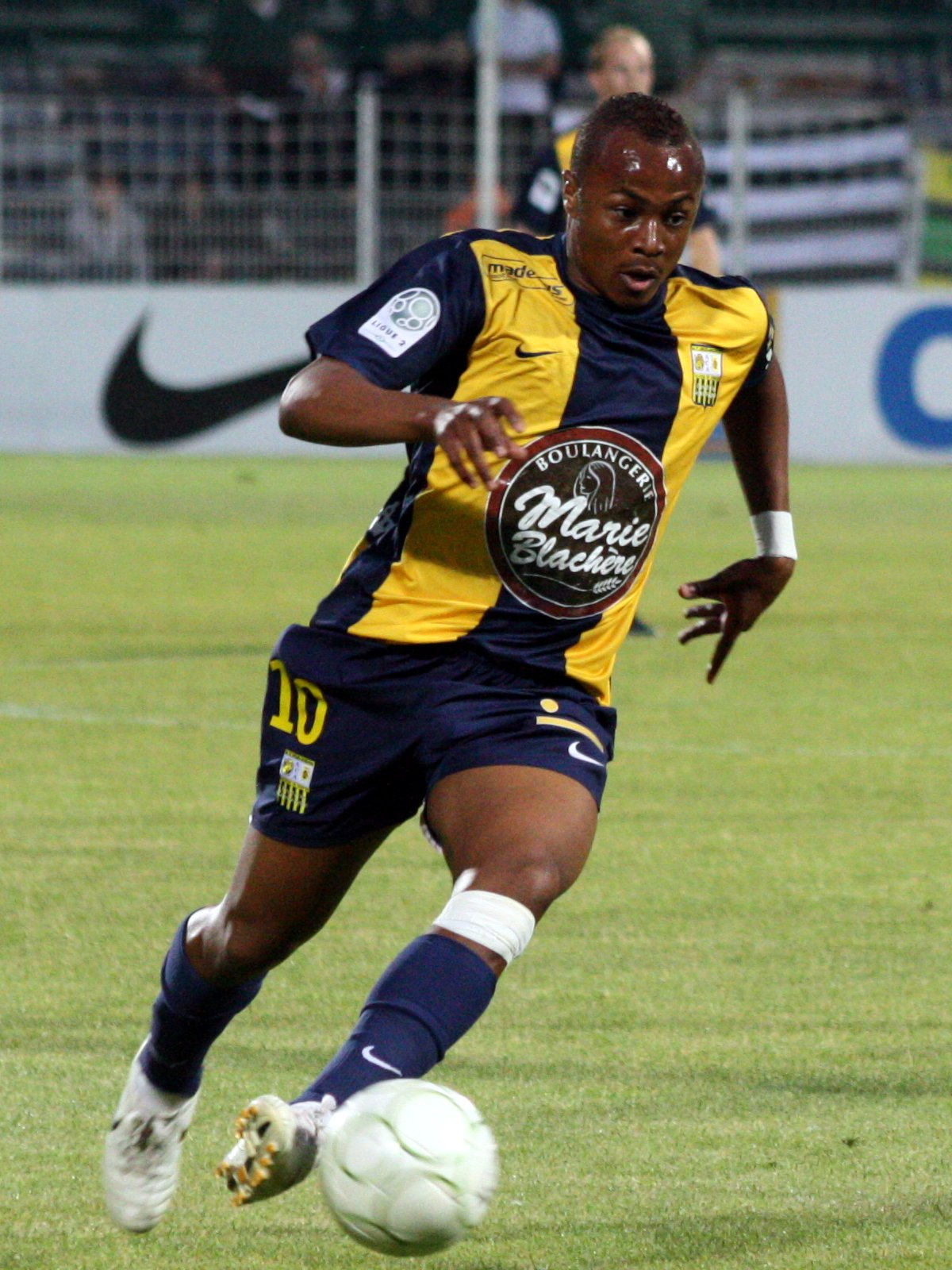
Ayew playing with Arles-Avignon in 2009

For the 2008–09 season, Ayew switched to the squad number 8 shirt, though due to the arrival of attackers Hatem Ben Arfa, Sylvain Wiltord, Bakari Koné and Mamadou Samassa, he was deemed surplus to requirements for the season and was loaned out to fellow first division club Lorient for the season. Ayew was used by manager Christian Gourcuff as one of the team's focal points of the attack alongside Fabrice Abriel, Kevin Gameiro and Rafik Saïfi and made his debut on 16 August 2008, coming on as a substitute in a 0–0 draw against Lyon. On 27 September 2008, he scored his first professional goal after netting the opener in the team's 1–1 draw with Sochaux. A month later, he scored his second career goal in a 4–1 rout of Saint-Étienne. Despite the initial success, Ayew was limited throughout the league campaign to just appearing as a substitute. He finished the season with 22 league appearances and three goals and, on 30 June 2009, returned to Marseille.

Two months later, on 31 August 2009, the last day of the transfer window, new manager Didier Deschamps confirmed that Ayew would be joining newly promoted Ligue 2 club Arles-Avignon on loan for the 2009–10 season. Ayew was given the number 10 shirt and his favorable right wing position. He made his debut with the club on 11 September, appearing as a substitute in a 1–1 draw with Angers. The following week, he scored his first goal for the club in a 4–2 defeat to Tours. He was ever present in the team's fall campaign, but due to the 2010 Africa Cup of Nations, he missed the month of January. Ayew returned to the team on 5 February 2010 and appeared as a starter in all of the team's matches for the rest of the campaign. On 9 April, with the team in the midst of a promotion battle, Ayew scored a double in the team's 2–1 victory over Le Havre. The following week, he struck again scoring the opener in the team's 1–1 draw with Guingamp. On 14 May, Arles-Avignon secured promotion to Ligue 1 following the team's 1–0 win over Clermont. Ayew started and played the entire match. He finished the campaign with Arles-Avignon appearing in 26 total matches and scoring four goals.

==== Return to Marseille ====
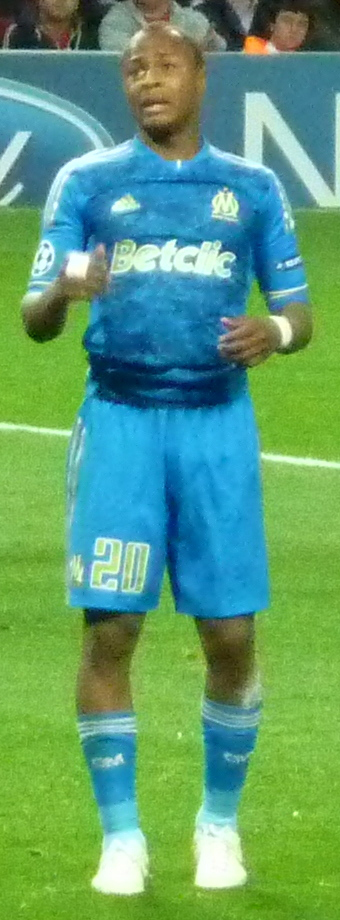
Ayew with Marseilles in the 2011–2012 UEFA Champions League

After the successful league campaign with Arles-Avignon, on 16 May 2010, Marseille manager Didier Deschamps confirmed that Ayew would be returning to the team and that he will be earning some significant playing time with the club for the 2010–11 season. On 5 August, Ayew signed a three-year contract extension with Marseille. The new deal kept him at the club until June 2014. Despite the arrival of Loïc Rémy, Ayew was inserted as a starter by Deschamps and scored his first goal in the second league match of the season against Valenciennes in a 3–2 defeat. Following the international break in September, he scored a double against his former club Arles-Avignon in a 3–0 win.

In the Coupe de la Ligue, Ayew scored goals in victories over Guingamp and Monaco in the Round of 16 and quarter-finals, respectively. On 20 November, he scored the only goal in a victory over Toulouse. Ayew scored the goal two minutes from time. On 27 April 2011, Ayew scored his first professional hat-trick in a 4–2 victory over Nice. His younger brother, Jordan, converted the other goal for Marseille in the win. Because of his outstanding performances throughout the season, Ayew was nominated for Ligue 1 Young Player of the Season, along with Marvin Martin and Yann M'Vila. He was voted Marseille's Best Player for the Season for 2010–11.

Ayew was named in the squad for the 2011 Trophée des Champions match against Lille held on 27 July 2011 at the Stade de Tanger in Morocco. He scored a hat-trick, including two 90th minute penalties, ensuring Marseille a 5–4 victory. In December 2011, Ayew signed a one-year contract extension until 2015 with a release clause of €18 million. On 22 February 2012, Ayew scored a goal in the 93rd minute, in a 1–0 victory over Inter Milan in the 2011–12 UEFA Champions League round of 16 first leg. However, Marseille managed to qualify to the quarter-finals by winning on away goals rule, after drawing 2–2 on aggregate.

On 4 April 2014, Ayew scored only his second hat-trick of his Marseille career, inspiring his club to a 3–1 league victory, their first in seven outings, over bottom club Ajaccio.

=== Swansea City ===
On 10 June 2015, Premier League side Swansea City announced that Ayew had joined the club on a free transfer, signing a four-year contract with the Swans pending Premier League and international clearance. Ayew scored his first goal for the club on his debut against Chelsea on 8 August 2015 in a 2–2 draw. On 15 August 2015, Ayew scored his second goal in his second game for Swansea in their 2–0 victory against Newcastle United. He continued his form in the next league fixture against Manchester United, where he scored and created an assist. Ayew was named Premier League Player of the Month for August 2015 and also received Swansea's monthly award the GWFX Player of the Month for August after making an immediate impact, scoring three goals in his first four league appearances.

Ayew ended the 2015–16 season as Swansea's top goalscorer with twelve goals from 34 Premier League appearances.

=== West Ham United ===
On 8 August 2016, Ayew signed for West Ham United for a then club record fee of £20.5 million on a three-year contract, with the option of an extra two years. Ayew's debut game for West Ham, on 15 August 2016, against Chelsea, lasted 35 minutes before he was substituted after sustaining a thigh injury. He returned to first team action on 26 October 2016 in a 2–1 home win against Chelsea in the EFL Cup. On 26 December 2016 Ayew scored his first West Ham goal. Playing away at his former club, Swansea City, Ayew scored the first goal in a 4–1 West Ham win. Ayew left West Ham in January 2018 having scored 12 goals in 50 games in all competitions.

=== Return to Swansea City ===
On 31 January 2018, Ayew completed a deadline day return to Swansea City for a reported £18 million rising to £20 million with add-ons.

He made twelve appearances for Swansea without scoring during the 2017–18 season as the team was relegated from the Premier League.

==== Fenerbahçe (loan) ====
In July 2018, Ayew joined Süper Lig club Fenerbahçe on a season-long loan. The deal reportedly included an option for the club to sign Ayew permanently at the end of the loan period.

After scoring five goals in 29 Süper Lig appearances, Ayew returned to Swansea at the end of his loan.

==== 2019–20 season ====
On 13 August 2019, Ayew made his first appearance for Swansea since 2018, scoring two goals in a 3–1 win against Northampton Town in the EFL Cup. He scored 18 goals from 47 appearances as Swansea reached the Championship play-off semi-finals, losing 3–2 to Brentford on aggregate.

==== 2020–21 season ====
During the 2020–21 season, Ayew scored 17 goals in all competitions, including once in the first leg of the play-off semi-final win over Barnsley.

On 29 May 2021, Ayew made his final appearance for Swansea, playing the full 90 minutes as the team lost 2–0 to Brentford in the Championship play-off final at Wembley Stadium. On 4 June, Swansea announced Ayew would leave the club upon the expiration of his contract.

=== Al Sadd ===
On 21 July 2021, Qatar Stars League club Al Sadd SC announced that they had reached an agreement to sign Ayew on a free transfer. He was expected to arrive in Doha the following morning to complete the routine procedures, followed by the signing of the contract and the official announcement. On 22 July, the club announced his transfer and unveiled him after he had signed a two-year contract with an option for an additional year. He was reportedly set to earn around $220,000 a month. He joined the club 39 years after his father Abedi Pele also signed and played for them in 1983.

During his only full season at Al Sadd, Ayew finished as second-top goalscorer in the QSL as the team won its 16th league title.

=== Nottingham Forest ===
On 2 February 2023, following his release from Al Sadd, Ayew joined Premier League club Nottingham Forest on a contract until the end of the season.

On 26 April, Ayew came on as late substitute in a 3–1 victory over Brighton & Hove Albion to make his 100th Premier League appearance.

Ayew was released by Forest following the 2022–23 season, having made 13 Premier League appearances, starting once.

=== Le Havre ===
On 11 November 2023, Ayew completed a transfer to French Ligue 1 club Le Havre. Later that month, on 26 November, he made his debut for the Normandy club as a 65th-minute substitute in a Ligue 1 fixture against Nantes and was sent off three minutes later for a foul on Eray Cömert.

On 4 October 2024, Ayew rejoined Le Havre after his contract had expired in the summer by signing a one-year deal.

=== NAC Breda ===
On 31 December 2025, André Ayew signed for Dutch Eredivisie club NAC Breda as a free agent after spending the first half of the 2025–26 season without a club. He joined the team on a short-term deal as NAC Breda sought experienced players to strengthen their squad in their fight against relegation. Ayew made his debut for the club in a 0–0 draw against FC Groningen, coming on as a substitute as he began integrating into the team after several months without competitive football.

On 8 March 2026, he scored his first goal for NAC Breda in a 3–3 Eredivisie draw against Feyenoord at the Rat Verlegh Stadion. Ayew scored with a header from a cross by Lewis Holtby, briefly putting NAC Breda 3–2 ahead in the match before Feyenoord equalised later in the game.

== International career ==
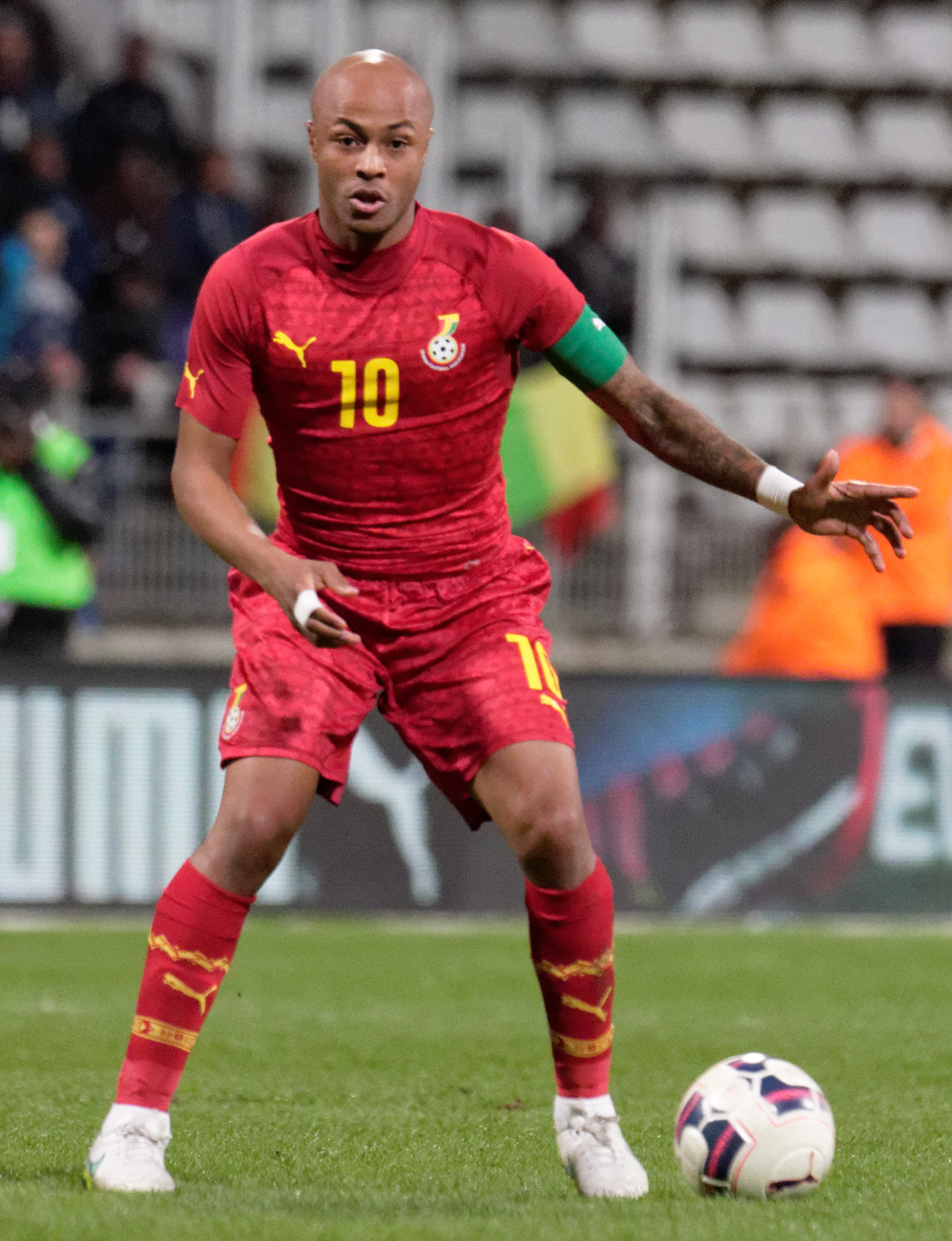
André Ayew as captain of Ghana versus Mali in 2015

=== Youth ===
Due to having dual French and Ghanaian citizenship, Ayew was eligible for France and Ghana. He initially chose to represent France, citing the failed inquiries of the Ghana Football Association to contact him as his reason why, but declared Ghana to be his first option, citing his father. Ayew was subsequently called up and participated in a training camp with the France under-18 team. In 2007, he turned down several offers to play for the country's under-21 team. Ayew later warned the Ghana Football Association that he was on the verge of representing France at international level, stating, "At this moment there is only one choice to make because I have only received an invitation from one country and that is France."

At the youth level, Ayew represented Ghana at under-20 level and captained the team to victory at both the 2009 African Youth Championship and the 2009 FIFA U-20 World Cup. At the African Youth Championship, Ayew scored two goals against Cameroon in the group stage and South Africa in the semi-finals. The 4–3 semi-final result progressed Ghana to the final where the team defeated group stage opponents Cameroon 2–0. The championship victory resulted in the team qualifying for the ensuing U-20 World Cup. In the tournament, Ayew scored twice against England in a 4–0 rout and the equalizing goal against South Africa in the round of 16. Ghana later won the match in extra time through a goal from Dominic Adiyiah. Ayew then captained the team to victories over the South Korea and Hungary in the quarter-finals and semi-finals, respectively, to reach the final where they faced Brazil. In the final, Ghana defeated the Brazilians 4–3 on penalties to win the U-20 World Cup. Ayew converted Ghana's first penalty in the shootout.

=== Senior ===
On 7 August 2007, Ayew was called up for the first time by Ghana coach Claude Le Roy for the team's friendly match against Senegal on 21 August. He made his international debut in the match, appearing as a late-match substitute. On 11 January 2008, Ayew was named to the Ghana squad to play in the 2008 Africa Cup of Nations.

Ayew made his second major international tournament appearance by appearing at the 2010 Africa Cup of Nations. On 19 January 2010, in the team's final group stage match against Burkina Faso, he scored his first international goal in 30th minute with a header. Ghana won the match 1–0 and reached the final where they were defeated 1–0 by Egypt. Ayew appeared in all five matches the team contested.

On 7 May 2010, Ayew was named to coach Milovan Rajevac's 30-man preliminary squad to participate in the 2010 FIFA World Cup. He was later named to the 23-man team to compete in the competition alongside his brother Ibrahim. On 12 June, Ayew made his FIFA World Cup debut in the team's opening group stage match against Serbia, starting ahead of the more experienced Sulley Muntari. He later started in the team's ensuing group stage matches against Australia and Germany. In the team's round of 16 match against the United States, Ayew assisted on the game-winning goal scored by Asamoah Gyan after sending a lob–pass into the United States defense, which Gyan collected and then converted. For his performance in the match, Ayew was named Man of the Match by FIFA. Ayew missed the team's quarter-final defeat on penalties to Uruguay due to yellow card accumulation. He went on to play in the 2012 Africa Cup of Nations, scoring against Mali and Tunisia, as the Black Stars finished in fourth place.

In February 2013, Ayew retired from international football after a dispute with the Ghana Football Association. However, he returned to the team for a World Cup qualifier against Zambia on 6 September. He then went on to start in both legs of Ghana's 7–3 aggregate play-off defeat of Egypt to secure qualification to the 2014 FIFA World Cup.

On 2 June 2014, Ayew was named in Ghana's squad for the World Cup. In the team's opening match, he scored an 82nd minute equalising goal against the United States in an eventual 2–1 defeat. He then scored the Black Stars' first goal in a 2–2 draw with Germany in their second group match.

On 19 January 2015, Ayew scored Ghana's first goal of the 2015 Africa Cup of Nations in a 2–1 loss to Senegal.

Ayew is currently the captain of the Black Stars. On 3 January 2022, Ayew was named in Ghana's 28-man final squad for the delayed 2021 Africa Cup of Nations. Ghana lost their first match at the tournament against Morocco, which Ayew played the full 90 minutes. He would however score a goal in Ghana's second group game, a 1–1 draw against Gabon. In Ghana's third game Ayew was sent off during the course of an unexpected 3–2 defeat to the Comoros, with Ghana finishing bottom of their group of four.

Ayew helped Ghana qualify for the 2022 World Cup, where they were placed in Group H. His participation at the tournament made Ayew the only Ghanaian player to feature at the nation's last three World Cups. In Ghana's first game of the group stage, Ayew scored his side's first goal of the competition, equalizing in the 73rd minute to bring the score to 1–1 during the course of an eventual 3–2 defeat against Portugal. Following a 3–2 victory over South Korea, Ghana required a win or draw in their final group match against Uruguay to advance, and were awarded an early penalty, taken by Ayew. However, Ayew would see his attempt saved, and Uruguay went on to score twice in the first half. At half-time, Ayew and his brother Jordan were both substituted, but the scoreline finished unchanged at 2–0, to send Ghana home in fourth place in their group.

== Personal life ==
Ayew was born in Seclin, France, to Ghanaian parents, and holds both French and Ghanaian nationalities. Through his mother, Maha Ayew, he has Lebanese ancestry; his maternal grandfather, Abdul Aziz Khaldi, was Lebanese. He comes from a family of footballers: his father, Abedi Pele, was a Ghanaian international footballer, while his brothers Jordan and Ibrahim, and uncles Kwame and Sola, have also played professionally. He also has a sister, Imani.

Ayew is a practising Muslim. He married his long-term partner, Yvonne, with whom he has 2 daughters: Maha and Inaya.

=== Charity work ===
On 26 July 2019, Ayew made donations to the Ghana under-20 team, which he captained to victory 10 years earlier. This was a move that was made to encourage and motivate the team ahead of the Africa games slated for the following month in Rabat, Morocco.

== Career statistics ==
=== Club ===
As of match played 17 May 2025

Appearances and goals by club, season and competition
Club	Season	League			National cup		League cup		Continental		Other		Total	
Club	Season	Division	Apps	Goals	Apps	Goals	Apps	Goals	Apps	Goals	Apps	Goals	Apps	Goals
Marseille	2007–08	Ligue 1	9	0	2	0	0	0	4	0	—		15	0
Marseille	2010–11	Ligue 1	37	11	1	0	4	2	8	0	1 (Note: Appearance in Trophée des Champions)	0	51	13
Marseille	2011–12	Ligue 1	26	8	2	1	1	0	9	4	1	3	39	16
Marseille	2012–13	Ligue 1	35	9	2	0	1	0	7	3	—		45	12
Marseille	2013–14	Ligue 1	25	6	0	0	0	0	4	2	—		29	8
Marseille	2014–15	Ligue 1	28	10	1	1	1	0	—		—		30	11
Marseille	Total		160	44	8	2	7	2	32	9	2	3	209	60
Lorient (loan)	2008–09	Ligue 1	22	3	2	0	0	0	—		—		24	3
Arles-Avignon (loan)	2009–10	Ligue 2	25	4	1	0	0	0	—		—		26	4
Swansea City	2015–16	Premier League	34	12	0	0	1	0	—		—		35	12
West Ham United	2016–17	Premier League	25	6	0	0	1	0	0	0	—		26	6
West Ham United	2017–18	Premier League	18	3	2	0	4	3	—		—		24	6
West Ham United	Total		43	9	2	0	5	3	0	0	—		50	12
Swansea City	2017–18	Premier League	12	0	0	0	0	0	—		—		12	0
Swansea City	2019–20	Championship	44	15	0	0	1	2	—		2 (Note: Appearances in Championship promotion play-offs)	1	47	18
Swansea City	2020–21	Championship	43	16	0	0	1	0	—		3	1	47	17
Swansea City	Total		99	31	0	0	2	2	—		5	2	106	35
Fenerbahçe (loan)	2018–19	Süper Lig	29	5	3	0	—		6	0	—		38	5
Al Sadd	2021–22	Qatar Stars League	21	15	4	2	0	0	4	1	0	0	29	18
Al Sadd	2022–23	Qatar Stars League	9	3	0	0	0	0	0	0	1 (Note: Appearances in Qatari Stars Cup)	0	10	3
Al Sadd	Total		30	18	4	2	0	0	4	1	1	0	39	21
Nottingham Forest	2022–23	Premier League	13	0	—		—		—		—		13	0
Le Havre	2023–24	Ligue 1	19	5	1	1	—		—		—		20	6
Le Havre	2024–25	Ligue 1	27	4	1	0	—		—		—		28	4
Le Havre	Total		46	9	2	1	—		—		—		48	10
Career total			500	135	21	5	15	7	42	10	8	5	587	162

=== International ===
As of match played 26 March 2024

Appearances and goals by national team and year
National team	Year	Apps	Goals
Ghana	2007	5	0
Ghana	2008	6	0
Ghana	2009	1	0
Ghana	2010	17	2
Ghana	2011	5	0
Ghana	2012	10	2
Ghana	2013	3	0
Ghana	2014	10	4
Ghana	2015	12	3
Ghana	2016	2	1
Ghana	2017	8	2
Ghana	2018	1	0
Ghana	2019	8	1
Ghana	2020	3	4
Ghana	2021	9	3
Ghana	2022	13	2
Ghana	2023	3	0
Ghana	2024	4	0
Total		120	24

Scores and results list Ghana's goal tally first, score column indicates score after each Ayew goal.

List of international goals scored by André Ayew
No.	Date	Venue	Opponent	Score	Result	Competition
1	19 January 2010	Estádio 11 de Novembro, Luanda, Angola	Burkina Faso	1–0	1–0	2010 Africa Cup of Nations
2	5 September 2010	Somhlolo National Stadium, Lobamba, Swaziland	Swaziland	1–0	3–0	2012 Africa Cup of Nations qualification
3	28 January 2012	Stade de Franceville, Franceville, Gabon	Mali	2–0	2–0	2012 Africa Cup of Nations
4	5 February 2012	Stade de Franceville, Franceville, Gabon	Tunisia	2–1	2–1	2012 Africa Cup of Nations
5	16 June 2014	Arena das Dunas, Natal, Brazil	United States	1–1	1–2	2014 FIFA World Cup
6	21 June 2014	Castelão, Fortaleza, Brazil	Germany	1–1	2–2	2014 FIFA World Cup
7	6 September 2014	Baba Yara Stadium, Kumasi, Ghana	Uganda	1–1	1–1	2015 Africa Cup of Nations qualification
8	15 October 2014	Tamale Stadium, Tamale, Ghana	Guinea	2–1	3–1	2015 Africa Cup of Nations qualification
9	19 January 2015	Estadio de Mongomo, Mongomo, Equatorial Guinea	Senegal	1–0	1–2	2015 Africa Cup of Nations
10	27 January 2015	Estadio de Mongomo, Mongomo, Equatorial Guinea	South Africa	2–1	2–1	2015 Africa Cup of Nations
11	5 February 2015	Estadio de Malabo, Malabo, Equatorial Guinea	Equatorial Guinea	3–0	3–0	2015 Africa Cup of Nations
12	5 June 2016	Stade Anjalay, Belle Vue Maurel, Mauritius	Mauritius	1–0	2–0	2017 Africa Cup of Nations qualification
13	17 January 2017	Stade de Port-Gentil, Port-Gentil, Gabon	Uganda	1–0	1–0	2017 Africa Cup of Nations
14	29 January 2017	Stade d'Oyem, Oyem, Gabon	DR Congo	2–1	2–1	2017 Africa Cup of Nations
15	25 June 2019	Ismailia Stadium, Ismailia, Egypt	Benin	1–1	2–2	2019 Africa Cup of Nations
16	12 October 2020	Mardan Sports Complex, Aksu, Turkey	Qatar	2–1	5–1	Friendly
17	12 October 2020	Mardan Sports Complex, Aksu, Turkey	Qatar	4–1	5–1	Friendly
18	12 November 2020	Cape Coast Sports Stadium, Cape Coast, Ghana	Sudan	1–0	2–0	2021 Africa Cup of Nations qualification
19	12 November 2020	Cape Coast Sports Stadium, Cape Coast, Ghana	Sudan	2–0	2–0	2021 Africa Cup of Nations qualification
20	9 October 2021	Cape Coast Sports Stadium, Cape Coast, Ghana	Zimbabwe	3–1	3–1	2022 FIFA World Cup qualification
21	11 November 2021	Orlando Stadium, Johannesburg, South Africa	Ethiopia	1–0	1–1	2022 FIFA World Cup qualification
22	14 November 2021	Cape Coast Sports Stadium, Cape Coast, Ghana	South Africa	1–0	1–0	2022 FIFA World Cup qualification
23	14 January 2022	Ahmadou Ahidjo Stadium, Yaoundé, Cameroon	Gabon	1–0	1–1	2021 Africa Cup of Nations
24	24 November 2022	Stadium 974, Doha, Qatar	Portugal	1–1	2–3	2022 FIFA World Cup

== Honours ==
Marseille

- Coupe de la Ligue: 2010–11, 2011–12
- Trophée des Champions: 2010, 2011

Al Sadd

- Qatar Stars League: 2021–22
- Emir of Qatar Cup: 2021

Ghana U20

- FIFA U-20 World Cup: 2009
- African Youth Championship: 2009

Ghana

- Africa Cup of Nations runner-up: 2010, 2015; third place: 2008

Individual

- BBC African Footballer of the Year: 2011
- Prix Marc-Vivien Foé: 2015
- CAF Team of the Year: 2010, 2011, 2015
- Africa Cup of Nations Top Scorer: 2015
- Africa Cup of Nations Team of the Tournament: 2015
- Premier League Player of the Month: August 2015
- IFFHS CAF Men's Team of the Decade 2011–2020
- Calcio Trade Ball Order of the Star Award: 2022
- Ghana Player of the Year: 2011
- Ghana Football Awards Footballer of the Year: 2021
- Olympique de Marseille Player of the Season: 2011
- Swansea City Players' Player of the Year: 2019–20
- Swansea City Supporters' Player of the Year: 2019–20
- Swansea City Best Newcomer of the Year: 2015–16
- Ligue 1 Goal of the Month: January 2024

== See also ==
- List of men's footballers with 100 or more international caps
