= Jordan Ayew =

Ghanaian footballer (born 1991)

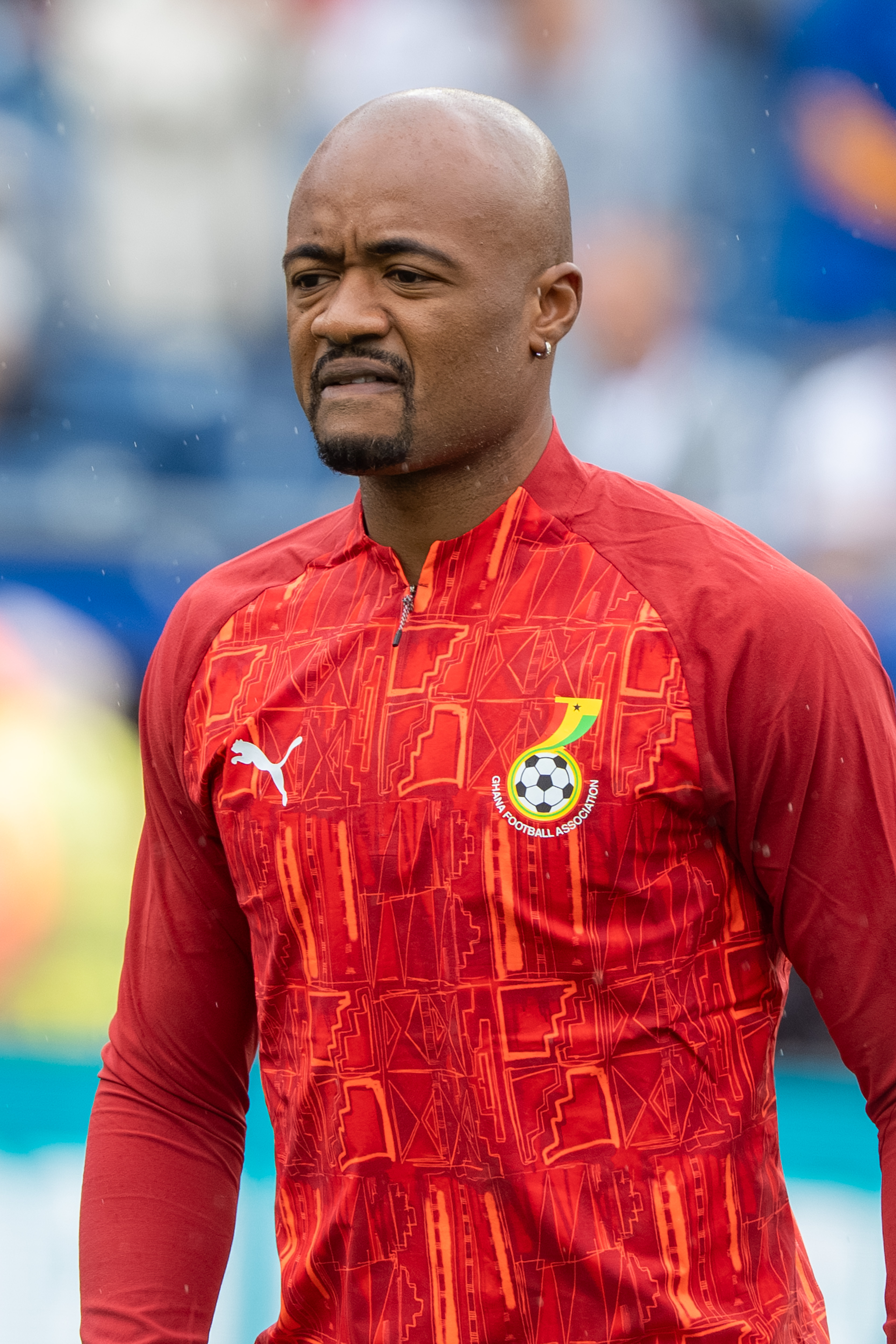
- Ayew with Ghana in 2026

Personal information
- Full name: Jordan Pierre Ayew
- Date of birth: 11 September 1991 (age 35)
- Place of birth: Marseille, France
- Height: 1.82 m (6 ft 0 in)
- Positions: Winger; forward

Team information
- Current team: Sheffield United
- Number: 10

Youth career
- 2000–2006: Lyon Duchère
- 2006–2009: Marseille

Senior career*
Years	Team	Apps	(Gls)
2009–2014	Marseille	111	(14)
2014	→ Sochaux (loan)	17	(5)
2014–2015	Lorient	31	(12)
2015–2017	Aston Villa	51	(9)
2017–2019	Swansea City	50	(8)
2018–2019	→ Crystal Palace (loan)	20	(1)
2019–2024	Crystal Palace	175	(21)
2024–2026	Leicester City	72	(11)
2026–	Sheffield United	8	(2)

International career^{‡}
2010	Ghana U20	1	(1)
2010–	Ghana	126	(35)
Medal record
Representing Ghana
Men's football
Africa Cup of Nations
Runner-up	2015
Unity Cup
Third place	2025
- * Club domestic league appearances and goals as of 16:57, 21 November 2026 (UTC) ‡ National team caps and goals as of 18:00, 16 November 2026 (UTC)

Jordan Pierre Ayew (born 11 September 1991) is a professional footballer who plays as a winger or forward for EFL Championship club Sheffield United. Born in France, he captains the Ghana national team.

The son of former Ghana national football captain Abedi Pele, and the brother of fellow players André and Ibrahim Ayew, Ayew began his professional career with Marseille, scoring on his senior debut in 2009. After short spells with fellow Ligue 1 clubs Sochaux and Lorient, he was signed by English side Aston Villa in 2015, finishing his only full season as the team's top scorer as they were relegated from the Premier League; this feat was subsequently repeated with Swansea City in 2018. Following Swansea's relegation, Ayew was signed by Crystal Palace, going on to make over 200 appearances for the club.

Born in France, Ayew made his senior debut for Ghana in 2010, and has served as captain since 2025. With over 120 caps, he is the country's record appearance holder. Ayew played for the national team at three FIFA World Cups (2014, 2022 and 2026), as well as six Africa Cup of Nations (2012, 2015, 2017, 2019, 2021 and 2023), helping them finish runners-up in 2015.

== Club career ==
=== Marseille ===
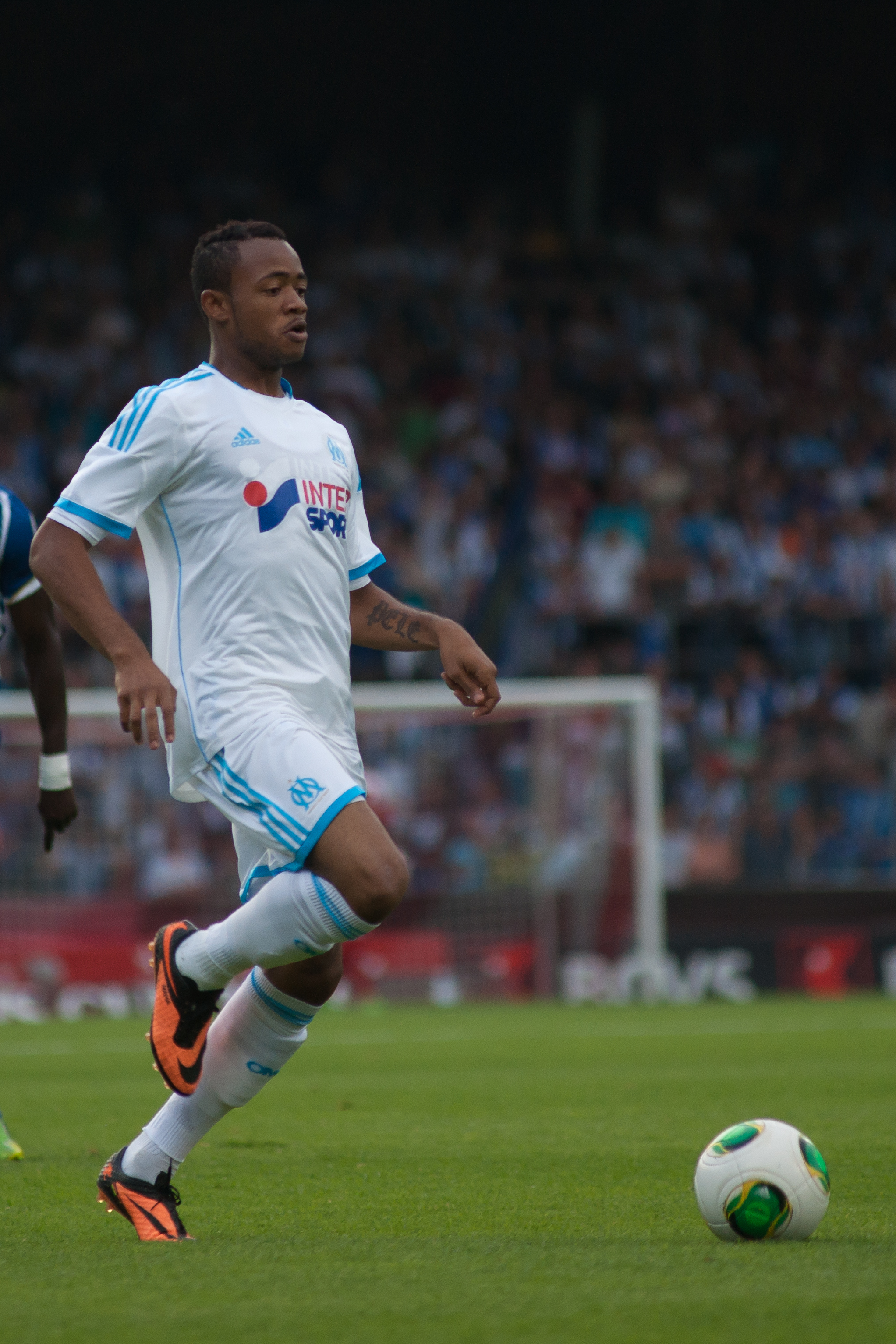
Ayew playing for OM in 2013

Ayew joined Marseille as a trainee in 2006. He signed a three-year professional contract with Marseille in 2009. Jordan Ayew made his debut for the senior team on 16 December 2009 in a league match, scoring the equaliser against Lorient. Marseille went on to win the match 2–1. Ayew scored his second goal against Nice at the Stade Vélodrome on 27 April 2011 in a match which saw his elder brother André Ayew score a hat-trick. On 1 November 2011, Jordan and André both started a UEFA Champions League match for the first time against Premier League giants Arsenal.

On 6 January 2014, he joined Ligue 1 rivals Sochaux on a loan deal until the end of the 2013–14 season.

=== Lorient ===
On 28 July 2014, Ayew signed a four-year contract with Lorient. Ayew explained the style and quality of play that Lorient proposed was the reason behind the decision.

=== Aston Villa ===
On 27 July 2015, Ayew joined Aston Villa on a five-year deal for an undisclosed fee, reported to be in the region of £8 million. He scored his first goal for the club on 24 October 2015 against his elder brother's club, Swansea City, in the 62nd minute. Aston Villa were relegated at the end of the 2015–16 season, winning only 17 points, but Ayew did end the season as their top scorer, albeit with just seven goals.

=== Swansea City ===
==== 2016–17 season ====
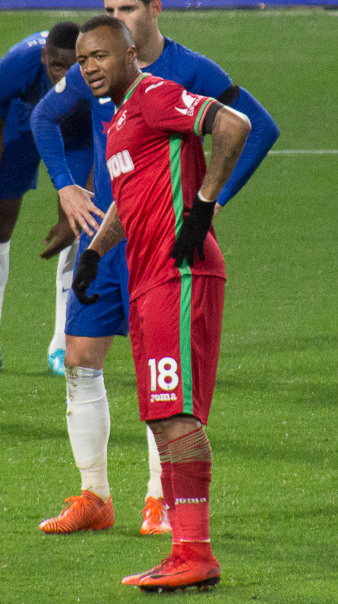
Ayew playing for Swansea in 2017

On 31 January 2017, Jordan Ayew joined Premier League Swansea City until the end of the 2019–20 season in exchange for Welsh International defender Neil Taylor, plus add-on fees from Swansea rising to £5 million if undisclosed future conditions were met. Jordan's elder brother was a Swansea City player during the 2015–16 season and later joined him in the winter transfer window of 2018. On 12 February 2017, he made his debut in a 2–0 victory over Leicester City after coming on in the 72nd minute for Fernando Llorente. In the final match of the season, Ayew scored his debut goal for Swansea by scoring the first goal, an equaliser which led to a their 2–1 comeback victory over West Bromwich Albion. He played a key role in helping them survive the league and avoid relegation by playing 14 matches, starting nine of those, scoring a goal and assisting three goals.

==== 2017–18 season ====
On 22 August 2017, Ayew put up a man of the match performance by scoring a 20-yard strike goal and assisting another for Tammy Abraham's debut goal in Swansea's EFL Cup match against MK Dons. His goal 20-yard effort was described by news outlet BBC as a tremendous strike. Ayew scored his first goal in the 2017–18 season, on 26 August 2017, to help The Swans to a 2–0 victory over his future club Crystal Palace. On 17 January 2018, he scored the opening goal in the Swans' 2–1 FA Cup replay match against Wolverhampton Wanderers.

At the end of his second season, his only full season with the club, he played 44 matches in all competition and scored 11 goals with 7 coming in the league. He finished the season as the club's top goal scorer and was voted the Players' Player of the season. His solo goal against Wolverhampton Wanderers scored on 17 January 2018 in the FA Cup won the club's goal of the season award. Despite his performance over the season, Swansea was relegated to the championship. This made it the fourth time he had ended as a club's top goal scorer but the club still getting relegated at the end of the season.

=== Crystal Palace ===
==== 2018–19 season ====
On transfer deadline day in August 2018, Ayew joined Crystal Palace on loan for the 2018–19 season. He made his debut on 1 September 2018, starting in Palace's 2–0 loss to Southampton. On 15 September, he put on an impressive performance against Huddersfield, providing the assist to Wilfried Zaha's goal to earn Palace a 1–0 victory. He was praised for his pressing, hold up play which helped in bringing others into play and allowing the other attackers the opportunity to create chances.

On 2 January 2019, he scored his first league goal for Palace by scoring the opening goal in their 2–0 victory over Wolverhampton Wanderers. Three days after, Ayew came on in the 68th minute for Jairo Riedewald to score a late winner (in the 86th minute) against Grimsby Town in the FA Cup.

==== 2019–20 season ====
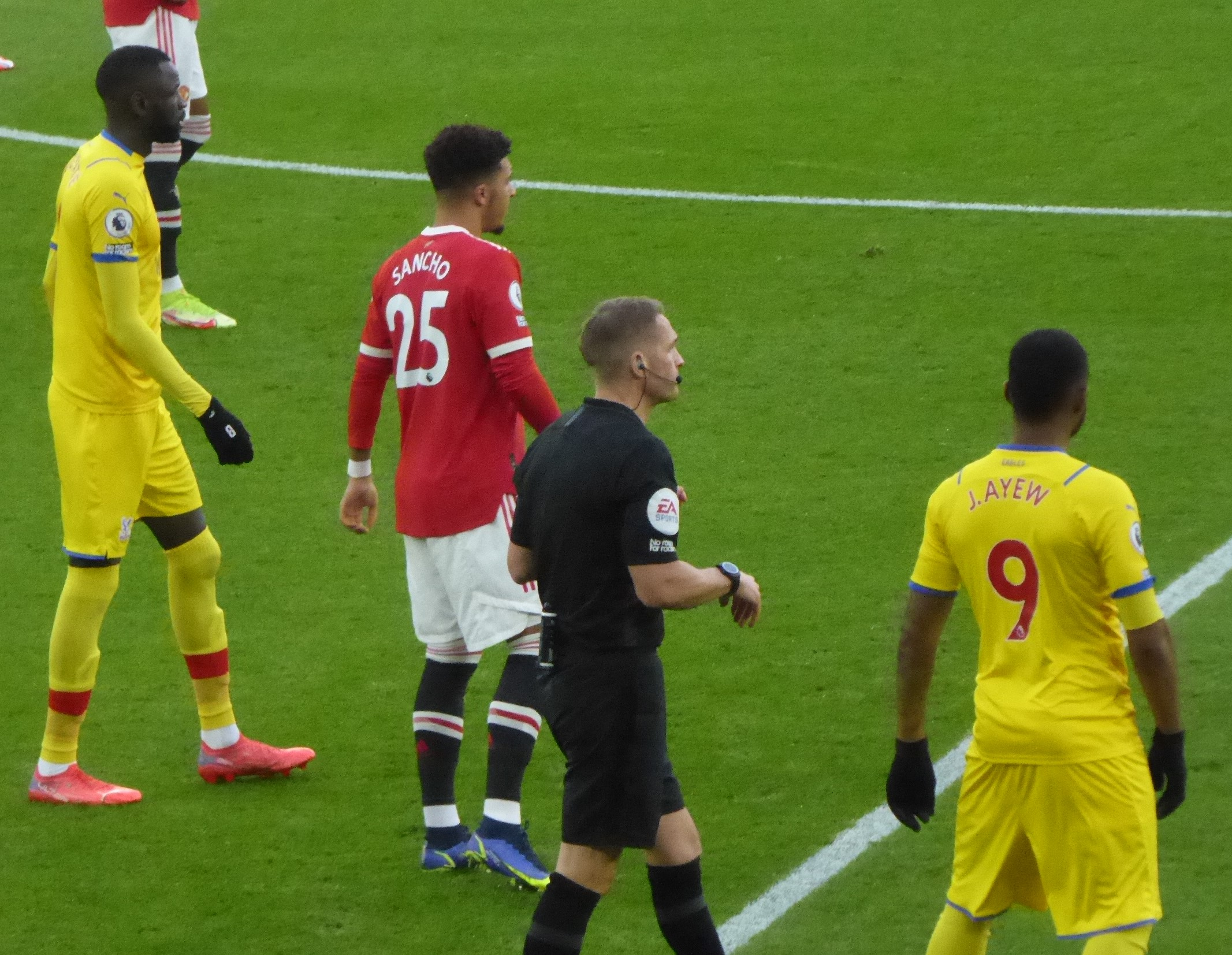
Ayew (9) playing for Crystal Palace against Manchester United in 2021

On 25 July 2019, Ayew made the move permanent with a £2.5m transfer from Swansea City on a three-year deal. Ayew scored his first goal of the season on 24 August 2019 against Manchester United at Old Trafford, netting the opener in the first half against the run of play, latching on to Jeffrey Schlupp's flick-on as Crystal Palace secured an historic 2–1 victory.

On Boxing Day 2019, Ayew scored the match winner in stoppage time as Crystal Palace came from behind to defeat West Ham United 2–1. It was Ayew's 21st goal in the Premier League with 20 having been scored in the second half (95%) – the highest such ratio of any player with 20+ goals in the competition's history. On 20 June 2020, he scored to assist the Eagles defeat Bournemouth 2–0, making him the highest-scoring Ghanaian in Premier League history with 25 goals. He surpassed Tony Yeboah who scored 24 goals while playing for Leeds United.

At the end of the season, Ayew was the highest goalscorer for Crystal Palace with 9 goals, and won the Crystal Palace Player of the season, Players' Player of the season and Goal of the season awards.

==== 2020–2023 ====
In the 2020–21 season, Ayew scored his only goal in the season in a 4–1 victory over Leeds United. He subsequently went 43 games without a goal before scoring a 65th-minute equaliser to secure a 2–2 Premier League draw for Crystal Palace against Southampton on 16 December 2021. On 4 April 2022, he scored the second goal in a 3–0 home victory over Arsenal at Selhurst Park. At the end of the 2021–22 season, he was played 31 league matches, scored 3 goals and made 3 assists.

In June 2022, he signed a contract extension keeping him at the club until 2023. Ayew scored his first goal of the 2022–23 season and his first goal after his contract extension on New Year's Eve, ending his goal drought failing to score from 13 starts in 15 matches. He scored the opening goal to help Crystal Palace to 2–0 victory over Bournemouth. On 9 April 2023, he scored a brace inspiring Crystal Palace to an emphatic 5–1 away victory against Leeds United. At the end of the 2022–23 season, Ayew played in all 38 league matches scoring four goals and providing three assists.

==== 2023–24 season ====
On 1 November 2023, Ayew signed a contract extension until 2025. On 27 February 2024, he made his 200th Crystal Palace appearance in all competitions, marking the milestone with a player of the match-winning performance including scoring one goal and assisting another in a 3–0 victory over Burnley. Days after that, he was adjudged the Crystal Palace men's Player of the Month for February.

=== Leicester City ===
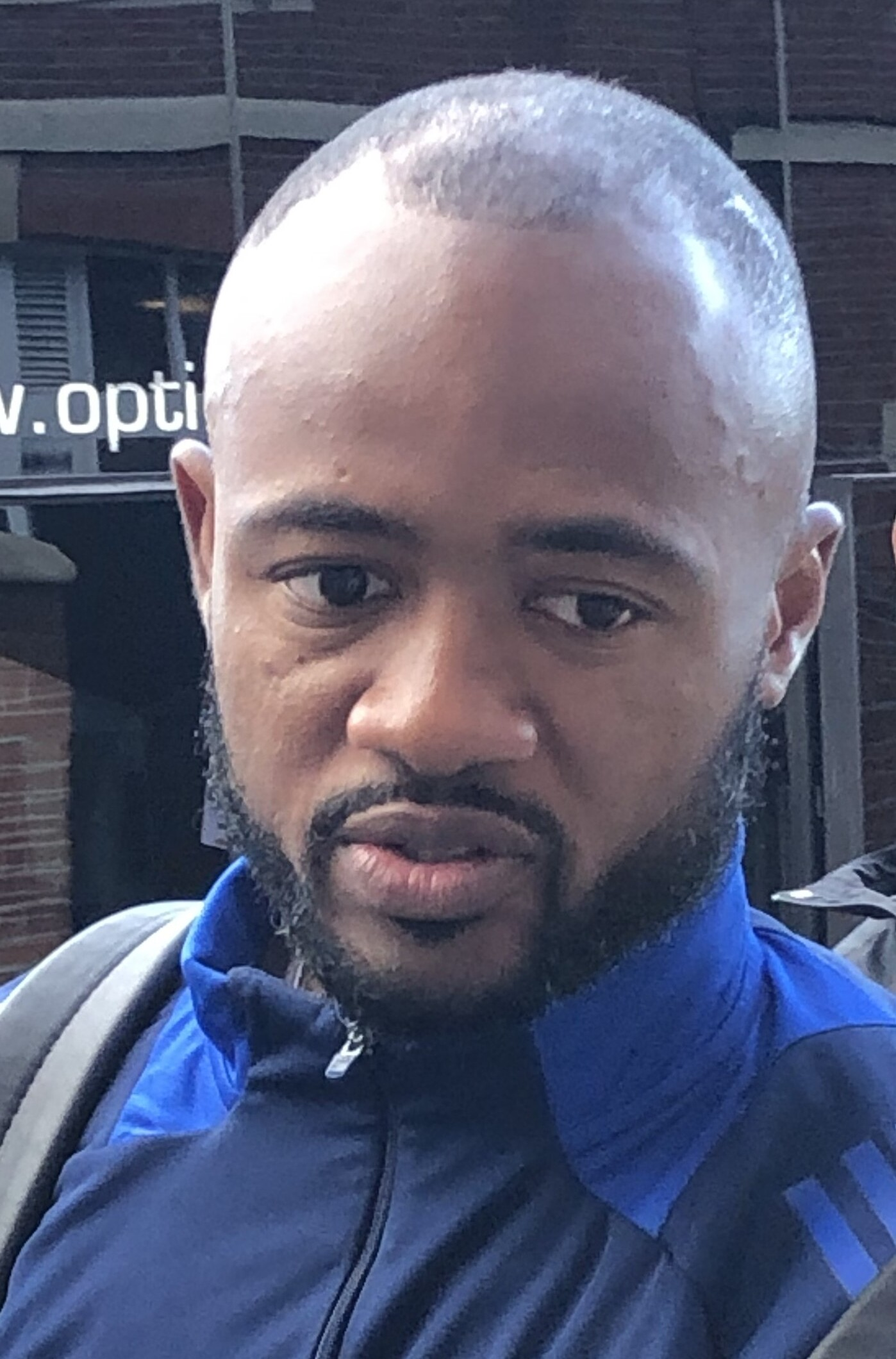
Ayew with Leicester City in 2024

On 23 August 2024, Leicester City signed Ayew on a two-year contract worth £5 million. He made his debut for the club on 24 August in a 2–1 defeat to Fulham, coming on for Bobby De Cordova-Reid. He scored his first goal for the club in a 4–0 win against Tranmere Rovers in the EFL Cup. On 19 October, he tallied his first league goal for the club when he scored a stoppage time winner against Southampton.

Leicester City endured successive relegation campaigns that saw them drop from the Premier League to the EFL Championship and then further into EFL League One, taking his total career relegations to five across five clubs. On 24 May 2026, the club announced it was releasing the player following relegation.

=== Sheffield United ===
On 8 September 2026, Ayew joined EFL Championship club Sheffield United on a deal until the end of the season.

== International career ==
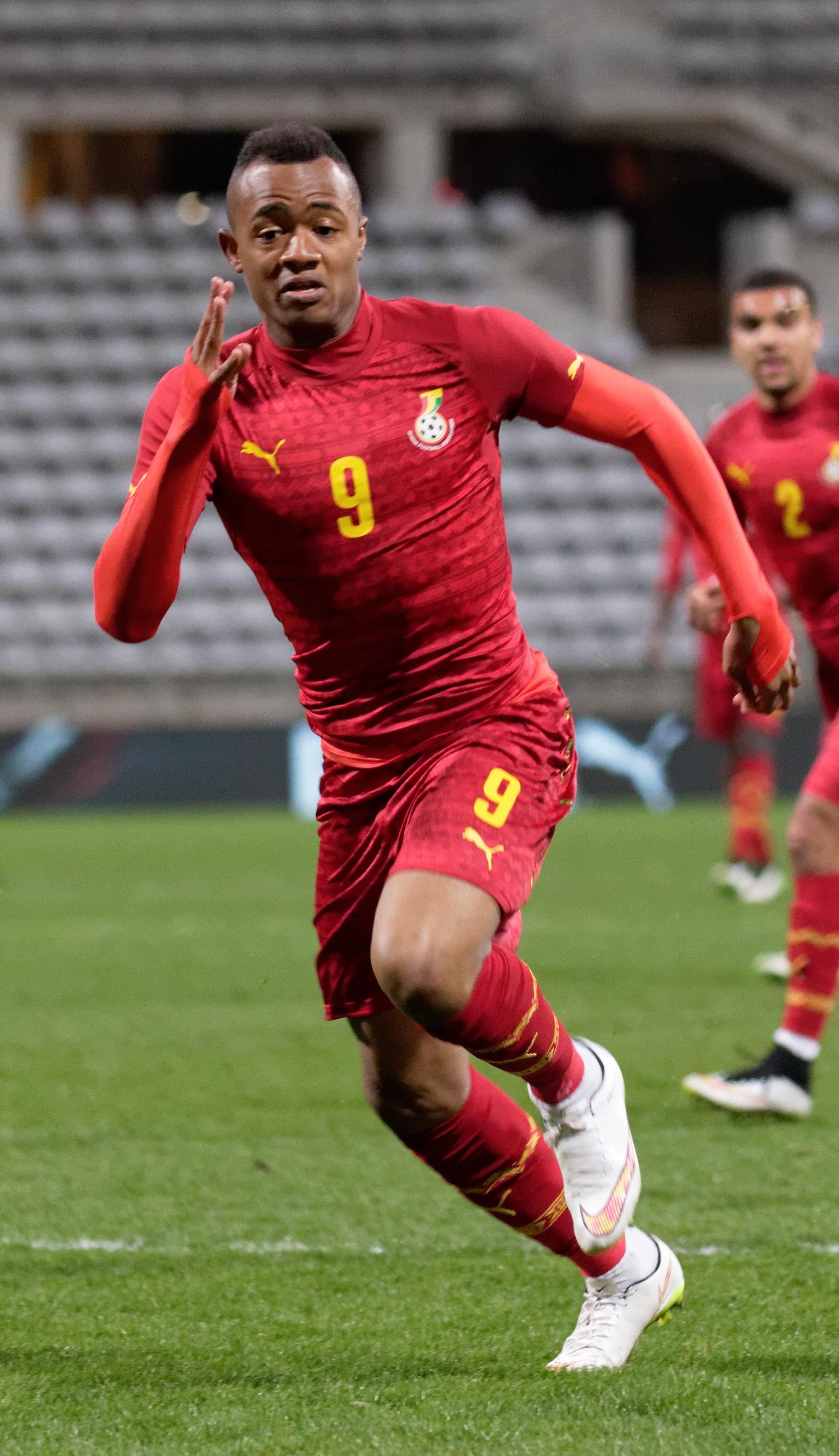
Ayew playing for Ghana in 2015

Born in France, Ayew is of Ghanaian and Lebanese descent and holds dual Ghanaian and French citizenship. He made his first senior appearance for Ghana on 5 September 2010, in a 3–0 2012 AFCON Qualification match win against Swaziland, at the Somhlolo National Stadium in Lobamba, Swaziland. On 1 June 2012, Ayew scored his first and second international goals in a 2014 World Cup qualification match win against Lesotho, at the Kumasi Sports Stadium in Kumasi, Ghana. In December 2011, Ayew was named to the Ghana national team provisional 25-man squad for the 2012 Africa Cup of Nations, and in January 2012 he was selected for the tournament's 23-man squad.

In June 2014, he was included in the Ghanaian squad for the 2014 World Cup. In Ghana's last warm-up match before the 2014 FIFA World Cup in Brazil on 9 June 2014, Ayew came on as a first-half substitute for the injured Majeed Waris and ended up scoring a hat-trick in a 4–0 victory over South Korea.

Jordan Ayew was part of the Ghanaian team in 2015 Africa Cup of Nations which took place in Equatorial Guinea that took a silver medal as result of losing out to Ivory Coast on a penalty shoot-out whom they clinch the African Cup, which occurred on 8 February 2015.

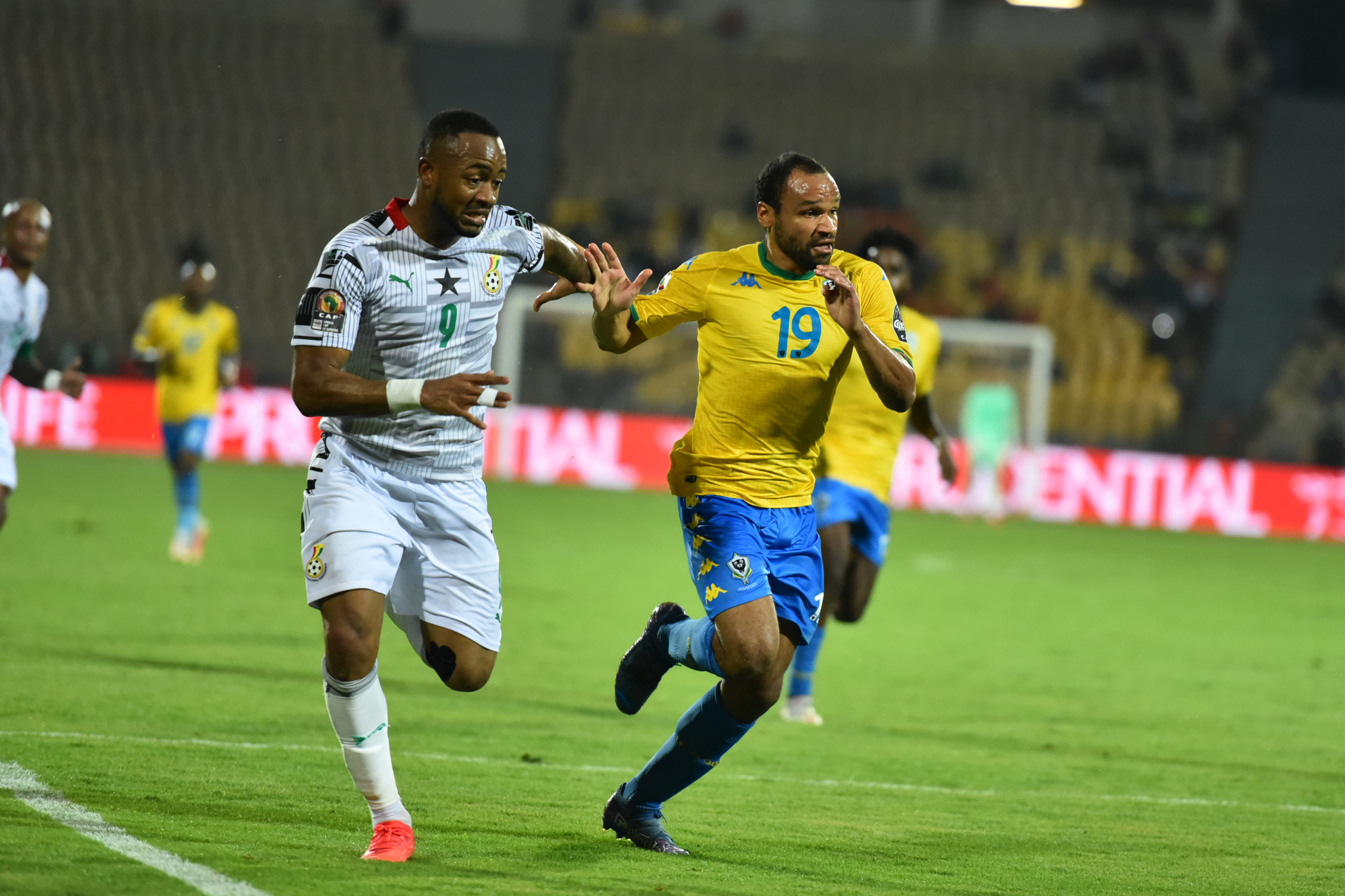
Ayew (left) playing for Ghana at the 2021 Africa Cup of Nations

He was part of the Ghanaian team in the 2021 Africa Cup of Nations that was eliminated at the group stage of the competition. In January 2024, he was named in the 27-man squad for the 2023 Africa Cup of Nations in Ivory Coast. He scored two penalties in his 100th international cap, which ended in a 2–2 draw against Mozambique in the last group stage match of the African competition.

He featured and scored in the 2026 World Cup qualifiers match on 6 June 2024 in which Ghana beat Mali 2–1, he also scored a hat-trick when the Black Stars beat the Central African Republic on 10 June 2024 at the Baba Yara Stadium in Kumasi. In November 2024, Ghana coach Otto Addo name Jordan Ayew captain of the team ahead of crucial Afcon 2025 qualification matches.

On 2 June 2026, he was named in the 26-man squad for the 2026 FIFA World Cup. On the same day, he featured in his 120th international match in a 1–1 friendly draw with Wales, equaling the record for the most international appearances by a Ghanaian player, previously set by his brother André Ayew. On 17 June, he made his record 121st appearance for Ghana in the team's World Cup opening match against Panama, also becoming the fourth player to represent Ghana at three different World Cups. At 34 years and 185 days, he surpassed Denis Odoi as the oldest player to feature for Ghana at a World Cup.

== Personal life ==
Ayew is the son of Ghanaian footballer Abedi Pele and Maha Ayew. Through his mother, he has Lebanese ancestry; his maternal grandfather, Abdul Aziz Khaldi, was Lebanese. He comes from a family of footballers: his father was a Ghanaian international footballer, while his brothers André and Ibrahim, and uncles Kwame and Sola, have also played professionally. He also has a sister, Imani.

Ayew is a practising Muslim. He has never married but has three children: two with Denise Acquah and another from a previous relationship.

== Career statistics ==
=== Club ===
As of match played 21 November 2026

Appearances and goals by club, season and competition
Club	Season	League			National cup (Note: Includes Coupe de France, FA Cup)		League cup (Note: Includes Coupe de la Ligue, EFL Cup)		Europe		Other		Total	
Club	Season	Division	Apps	Goals	Apps	Goals	Apps	Goals	Apps	Goals	Apps	Goals	Apps	Goals
Marseille	2009–10	Ligue 1	4	1	0	0	0	0	0	0	–		4	1
Marseille	2010–11	Ligue 1	22	2	1	0	3	0	3 (Note: Appearances in UEFA Champions League)	0	0	0	29	2
Marseille	2011–12	Ligue 1	34	3	3	3	1	1	6	0	1 (Note: Appearance in Trophée des Champions)	0	45	7
Marseille	2012–13	Ligue 1	35	7	2	0	1	0	9 (Note: Appearances in UEFA Europa League)	3	—		47	10
Marseille	2013–14	Ligue 1	16	1	0	0	1	0	5	1	—		22	2
Marseille	Total		111	14	6	3	6	1	23	4	1	0	147	22
Sochaux (loan)	2013–14	Ligue 1	17	5	1	0	0	0	—		—		18	5
Lorient	2014–15	Ligue 1	31	12	0	0	1	1	—		—		32	13
Aston Villa	2015–16	Premier League	30	7	3	0	3	0	—		—		36	7
Aston Villa	2016–17	Championship	21	2	0	0	1	1	—		—		22	3
Aston Villa	Total		51	9	3	0	4	1	—		—		58	10
Swansea City	2016–17	Premier League	14	1	—		—		—		—		14	1
Swansea City	2017–18	Premier League	36	7	5	2	3	2	—		—		44	11
Swansea City	Total		50	8	5	2	3	2	—		—		58	12
Crystal Palace (loan)	2018–19	Premier League	20	1	3	1	2	0	—		—		25	2
Crystal Palace	2019–20	Premier League	37	9	1	0	1	0	—		—		39	9
Crystal Palace	2020–21	Premier League	33	1	1	0	1	0	—		—		35	1
Crystal Palace	2021–22	Premier League	31	3	2	0	1	0	—		—		34	3
Crystal Palace	2022–23	Premier League	38	4	1	0	2	0	—		—		41	4
Crystal Palace	2023–24	Premier League	35	4	0	0	2	0	—		—		37	4
Crystal Palace	2024–25	Premier League	1	0	—		—		—		—		1	0
Crystal Palace	Total		175	21	5	0	7	0	—		—		187	21
Leicester City	2024–25	Premier League	30	5	2	0	3	1	—		—		35	6
Leicester City	2025–26	Championship	42	6	2	0	1	0	—		—		45	6
Leicester City	Total		72	11	4	0	4	1	—		—		80	12
Sheffield United	2026–27	Championship	8	2	0	0	1	0	—		—		9	2
Career total			535	83	27	6	28	6	23	4	1	0	614	99

=== International ===
As of match played 16 November 2026

Appearances and goals by national team and year
National team	Year	Apps	Goals
Ghana	2010	2	0
Ghana	2011	1	0
Ghana	2012	7	2
Ghana	2013	0	0
Ghana	2014	11	3
Ghana	2015	14	5
Ghana	2016	7	1
Ghana	2017	8	1
Ghana	2018	1	2
Ghana	2019	10	3
Ghana	2020	4	0
Ghana	2021	8	1
Ghana	2022	14	1
Ghana	2023	9	1
Ghana	2024	13	9
Ghana	2025	8	4
Ghana	2026	9	2
Total		126	35

Scores and results list Ghana's goal tally first, score column indicates score after each Ayew goal.

List of international goals scored by Jordan Ayew
No.	Date	Venue	Opponent	Score	Result	Competition
1.	1 June 2012	Baba Yara Stadium, Kumasi, Ghana	Lesotho	3–0	7–0	2014 FIFA World Cup qualification
2.	1 June 2012	Baba Yara Stadium, Kumasi, Ghana	Lesotho	6–0	7–0	2014 FIFA World Cup qualification
3.	9 June 2014	Sun Life Stadium, Miami Gardens, United States	South Korea	1–0	4–0	Friendly
4.	9 June 2014	Sun Life Stadium, Miami Gardens, United States	South Korea	3–0	4–0	Friendly
5.	9 June 2014	Sun Life Stadium, Miami Gardens, United States	South Korea	4–0	4–0	Friendly
6.	5 February 2015	Malabo Stadium, Malabo, Equatorial Guinea	Equatorial Guinea	1–0	3–0	2015 Africa Cup of Nations
7.	14 June 2015	Accra Sports Stadium, Accra, Ghana	Mauritius	2–0	7–1	2017 Africa Cup of Nations qualification
8.	14 June 2015	Accra Sports Stadium, Accra, Ghana	Mauritius	5–1	7–1	2017 Africa Cup of Nations qualification
9.	1 September 2015	Stade Municipal de Kintélé, Brazzaville, Congo	Congo	3–2	3–2	Friendly
10.	17 November 2015	Baba Yara Stadium, Kumasi, Ghana	Comoros	2–0	2–0	2018 FIFA World Cup qualification
11.	24 March 2016	Accra Sports Stadium, Accra, Ghana	Mozambique	3–0	3–1	2017 Africa Cup of Nations qualification
12.	29 January 2017	Stade d'Oyem, Oyem, Gabon	DR Congo	1–0	2–1	2017 Africa Cup of Nations
13.	18 November 2018	Addis Ababa Stadium, Addis Ababa, Ethiopia	Ethiopia	1–0	2–0	2019 Africa Cup of Nations qualification
14.	18 November 2018	Addis Ababa Stadium, Addis Ababa, Ethiopia	Ethiopia	2–0	2–0	2019 Africa Cup of Nations qualification
15.	25 June 2019	Ismailia Stadium, Ismailia, Egypt	Benin	2–1	2–2	2019 Africa Cup of Nations
16.	2 July 2019	Suez Stadium, Suez, Egypt	Guinea-Bissau	1–0	2–0	2019 Africa Cup of Nations
17.	18 November 2019	Estádio Nacional 12 de Julho, São Tomé, São Tomé and Príncipe	São Tomé and Príncipe	1–0	1–0	2021 Africa Cup of Nations qualification
18.	28 March 2021	Cape Coast Sports Stadium, Cape Coast, Ghana	São Tomé and Príncipe	2–0	3–1	2021 Africa Cup of Nations qualification
19.	10 June 2022	Noevir Stadium Kobe, Kobe, Japan	Japan	1–1	1–4	2022 Kirin Cup
20.	20 September 2023	Accra Sports Stadium, Accra, Ghana	Liberia	3–0	3–1	Friendly
21.	22 January 2024	Alassane Ouattara Stadium, Abidjan, Ivory Coast	Mozambique	1–0	2–2	2023 Africa Cup of Nations
22.	22 January 2024	Alassane Ouattara Stadium, Abidjan, Ivory Coast	Mozambique	2–0	2–2	2023 Africa Cup of Nations
23.	22 March 2024	Marrakesh Stadium, Marrakech, Morocco	Nigeria	1–2	1–2	Friendly
24.	26 March 2024	Marrakesh Stadium, Marrakech, Morocco	Uganda	2–1	2–2	Friendly
25.	6 June 2024	26 March Stadium, Bamako, Mali	Mali	2–1	2–1	2026 FIFA World Cup qualification
26.	10 June 2024	Baba Yara Stadium, Kumasi, Ghana	Central African Republic	1–0	4–3	2026 FIFA World Cup qualification
27.	10 June 2024	Baba Yara Stadium, Kumasi, Ghana	Central African Republic	2–2	4–3	2026 FIFA World Cup qualification
28.	10 June 2024	Baba Yara Stadium, Kumasi, Ghana	Central African Republic	3–2	4–3	2026 FIFA World Cup qualification
29.	15 November 2024	11 November Stadium, Talatona, Angola	Angola	1–0	1–1	2025 Africa Cup of Nations qualification
30.	21 March 2025	Accra Sports Stadium, Accra, Ghana	Chad	3–0	5–0	2026 FIFA World Cup qualification
31.	31 May 2025	Brentford Community Stadium, London, England	Trinidad and Tobago	1–0	4–0	2025 Unity Cup
32.	4 September 2025	Stade Olympique Maréchal Idriss Déby Itno, N'Djamena, Chad	Chad	1–0	1–1	2026 FIFA World Cup qualification
33.	8 October 2025	Ben M'Hamed El Abdi Stadium, El Jadida, Morocco	Central African Republic	4–0	5–0	2026 FIFA World Cup qualification
34.	27 March 2026	Ernst-Happel-Stadion, Vienna, Austria	Austria	1–3	1–5	Friendly
35.	16 November 2026	Sekondi-Takoradi Stadium, Essipong, Ghana	Somalia	1–0	1–0	2027 Africa Cup of Nations qualification

== Honours ==
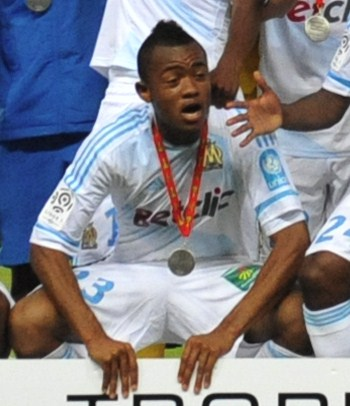
Ayew celebrating the 2011 Trophée des Champions with Marseille

Marseille

- Ligue 1: 2009–10
- Coupe de la Ligue: 2010–11, 2011–12
- Trophée des Champions: 2011

Ghana

- African Cup of Nations runner-up: 2015
- Unity Cup third place: 2025

Individual

- Ghana Player of the Year: 2020
- Crystal Palace Player of the Year: 2019–20
- Crystal Palace Players' Player of the Year: 2019–20
- Crystal Palace Goal of the Season: 2019–20
- Swansea City Players' Player of the Season: 2017–18
- Swansea City Goal of the Season: 2017–18

== See also ==
- List of men's footballers with 100 or more international caps
