= Matic Paljk =

Slovenian footballer

Personal information
- Full name: Matic Paljk
- Date of birth: 2 October 1997 (age 29)
- Place of birth: Koper, Slovenia
- Height: 1.90 m (6 ft 3 in)
- Position: Left-back

Team information
- Current team: Nafta 1903
- Number: 21

Youth career
- 2008–2010: Izola
- 2010–2015: Koper
- 2015–2016: → Spezia (loan)

Senior career*
Years	Team	Apps	(Gls)
2015–2017	Koper	16	(1)
2017–2018	Swansea City	0	(0)
2019–2020	Olimpija Ljubljana	0	(0)
2019–2020	→ Gorica (loan)	9	(0)
2020–2021	Gorica	15	(1)
2022–2023	Primorje	22	(1)
2023–	Nafta 1903	15	(2)

International career
2014	Slovenia U18	4	(0)
2017	Slovenia U21	3	(0)
- * Club domestic league appearances and goals as of 29 December 2023

Matic Paljk (born 2 October 1997) is a Slovenian professional footballer who plays as a left-back for Nafta 1903.

== Club career ==
Paljk started his youth career in Slovenia with Izola, before joining Koper in 2010. In 2015, Paljk joined Italian team Spezia on loan. He only featured for the club's U19s before returning to Koper. On 17 July 2016, he made his professional debut in the Slovenian PrvaLiga against Maribor, playing the first half in a 1–0 defeat. He went onto play sixteen times for Koper throughout the 2016–17 season and scored one goal, against Olimpija Ljubljana in March 2017. He departed Koper in the following summer after the club suffered relegation to the Slovenian Intercommunal Leagues.

In October 2017, Paljk joined Premier League side Swansea City on a free transfer. He signed a contract until June 2018 and immediately linked up with the Swansea U23s. He was released at the conclusion of the 2017–18 season.

In January 2019, Paljk returned to Slovenia's PrvaLiga after signing with Olimpija Ljubljana. After no competitive appearances for them, a loan move to the Second League with Gorica was completed in July 2019. Thirteen appearances followed, including his debut at home to ex-club Koper, as they won promotion to the top-flight via the play-offs. Paljk was signed permanently by Gorica in September 2020. His first game as a full-time member came in a defeat away to Olimpija Ljubljana on 30 September.

== International career ==
Paljk has represented Slovenia at under-18 and under-21 level. He won four caps for the U18s, prior to making three appearances for the U21s in 2017. Paljk received a call-up to the U19s in November 2015.

== Career statistics ==
As of 1 January 2022

Appearances and goals by club, season and competition
Club	Season	League			National cup		Continental		Other		Total	
Club	Season	Division	Apps	Goals	Apps	Goals	Apps	Goals	Apps	Goals	Apps	Goals
Koper	2016–17	PrvaLiga	16	1	1	0	—		—		17	1
Swansea City	2017–18	Premier League	0	0	0	0	—		—		0	0
Olimpija Ljubljana	2018–19	PrvaLiga	0	0	0	0	0	0	—		0	0
Olimpija Ljubljana	2019–20	PrvaLiga	0	0	0	0	0	0	—		0	0
Olimpija Ljubljana	Total		0	0	0	0	0	0	0	0	0	0
Gorica (loan)	2019–20	Second League	9	0	2	0	—		2 (Note: Appearance(s) in Slovenian Second League promotion play-offs)	0	13	0
Gorica	2020–21	PrvaLiga	15	1	0	0	—		—		15	1
Gorica	Total		24	1	2	0	0	0	2	0	28	1
Career total			40	2	3	0	0	0	2	0	45	2
