= Boys' and Girls' Clubs of Wales =

Youth work organisation

Boys and Girls Clubs of Wales is a national youth work organisation (Charity Number 1009142); which offers support and assistance to youth throughout the most deprived areas of Wales. Founded in 1922, the charity first began as a Boys Club in Treharris as a place for young males to retreat for leisure and education after working in the coal mines. Since then, Boys and Girls Clubs of Wales has expanded throughout all of Wales, offering opportunities to both boys and girls aged 11 to 25 years.

Boys and Girls Clubs of Wales offers opportunities for young people residing in disadvantaged areas of Wales, to enhance their skillset and employment prospects through their transition into adulthood. The organisation currently has over 170 affiliated clubs in Wales, with over 30,000 youth taking part in its activities and 3,500 volunteer mentors bringing their life experiences and leadership in a variety of interests and disciplines. The organisation's main purpose, as stated in its constitution, is "to assist in the process of moral, cultural, mental and physical development of young people, so as to ensure a smooth transition into adulthood and its responsibilities."

== History ==
In 1922 the first Boys' Club opened in Treharris, founded by Captain John Glynn-Jones (Captain Glynn) and David Davies. Captain Glynn was the welfare officer of Davies' Ocean Group of Collieries, which had coal mines all across South Wales. Captain Glynn had become concerned with the welfare of what were known as "collier boys", youth working in the mines, and developed the idea of a club boys could join that would encourage cultural activities, discipline and a healthy lifestyle. Other clubs followed the Treharris club, opening in Nantymoel, Ton Pentre, Treorchy, Wattstown and Nine Mile Point.

Captain Glynn, believing unity between clubs should be fostered, eventually the idea of a camp where members of different clubs could attend. The first of two of these camps, the St Athan Boys' Camp, opened in 1925, with the second, the Abercrave Adventure Centre, opening in 1958. In August 1928, after a meeting of Boys' Club leaders at the St Athan camp, the various existing clubs united as The South Wales Federation of Boys' Clubs.

In 1936 a process of decentralisation took place. This allowed larger clubs to become responsible for local satellite clubs. The majority of leaders for these clubs came from the larger 'parent' clubs, instead of having leaders travel large distances to and from clubs. There were twelve club areas in the region of South Wales after this took effect.

In 1991 the organisation expanded to officially allow girls within the organisation, changing its name to the Boys' and Girls' Club of Wales, and became a charity-based organisation in 1992. In 2006 it changed its name once more, to Clubs for Young People Wales, but after some time retook its former name.

== Projects ==
Boys' and Girls' Clubs of Wales sponsors multiple projects:

- The Duke of Edinburgh's Award
- Sport Leaders Awards, delivering courses to young people
- Street Games, providing sporting opportunities to young people within disadvantaged areas
- Millennium Volunteers, encouraging young people to volunteer within their community
- Exchanges, The Boys' and Girls' Clubs of Wales frequently run youth exchanges with out partners in Germany with 2013 being the tenth year that this has happened.

== Sports ==
The Boys' and Girls' Clubs of Wales have been doing sports in their clubs for over eighty years. The sports are used as an instrument for social cohesion for young people, as a way of keeping them actively engaged within the clubs and their specific communities.

The main sports used within the Boys' and Girls' Clubs of Wales are:

- Rugby
- Football
- Boxing
- Athletics

Many clubs also do many other sports and outdoor pursuits.

The Rugby Section of the organisation has two teams, Under 16 and Youth. Both teams play scheduled fixtures which include an away match against Belgium. Many successful Welsh Rugby players have played for the 'Boys Clubs' and have gone on to have successful careers. Welsh and Lions squad member Richard Hibbard is one such player who has come through these ranks.

The Boys' and Girls' clubs of Wales have both male and female teams, each with their own successes.

The Boys' teams have been competing for over sixty years with each season ending with an under 14's, 16's and 18's match against the Scottish Boys' and Girls' Clubs. Each team has their own leagues that they also compete in. Finally, once a year, the under 18 side take part in the TSV Eltingen (Germany) invitation International Championship.

The Girls' teams are growing in strength and numbers. Always looking to expand within the area the season finishes with a set of fixtures at the Rose Bowl Championship which is held in Northern Ireland every Summer

The sport of boxing is heavily used for engaging the young people of Wales. It has been a tradition of the Boys' club since the early roots of its existence. Joe Calzaghe was one such name to have come through the ranks of these Welsh clubs as a youngster.

== Youth work ==
The Boys' and Girls' Clubs of Wales have been delivering youth work now for over eighty years and is at the forefront of youth work within Wales. The main aim is to support and assist in the physical, educational and ethical development of young people, through their leisure time activities.

Throughout all activities of the organisation the Boys' and Girls' Clubs make use of the 'Principles and Practice of Youth Work' and ensure that all our Youth Work remains Educative, Expressive, Participative and Empowering.

== Previous members ==
Lynn Davies - 1964 Olympic Long Jump Gold Medalist. The memories that Lynn got here were of a 'warm welcoming place were we were encouraged to take part and enjoy the companionship' of the many friends he made. Lynn also describes how the Clubs helped develop confidence and self-esteem.

Joe Calzaghe - World Light Heavyweight Champion in 2007, known throughout the world as 'The Pride of Wales'. Joe is also considered by many to be the most successful British boxer of all time.

John Hartson - Ex Arsenal and Welsh footballer. John testifies how the organisation gave him his first opportunity to represent Wales as a sportsmen.

Nathan Cleverly - WBO Light Heavyweight Champion 2010. Nathan started his career in the Clubs for Young People UK Boxing Championships.

Alan Curtis - Swansea, Cardiff and Welsh footballer.

Richard Hibbard - Welsh and Lions rugby player.
