= Modou Barrow =

Gambian footballer (born 1992)

Mo Barrow
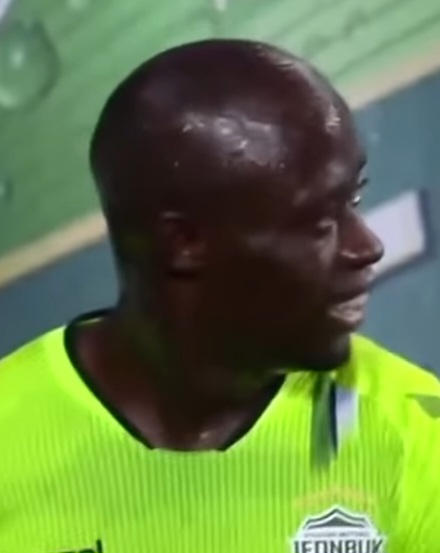
- Barrow in 2020

Personal information
- Full name: Modou Secka Barrow
- Date of birth: 13 October 1992 (age 34)
- Place of birth: Banjul, The Gambia
- Height: 1.76 m (5 ft 9 in)
- Positions: Winger; forward

Youth career
- Real de Banjul FC
- Östers IF
- Mjölby AI

Senior career*
Years	Team	Apps	(Gls)
2010	Mjölby AI	15	(6)
2011	Mjölby Södra	19	(23)
2012	IFK Norrköping	7	(0)
2013	Varbergs BoIS	28	(2)
2014	Östersunds FK	19	(10)
2014–2017	Swansea City	51	(1)
2015	→ Nottingham Forest (loan)	4	(0)
2015	→ Blackburn Rovers (loan)	4	(0)
2017	→ Leeds United (loan)	5	(0)
2017–2020	Reading	77	(14)
2019–2020	→ Denizlispor (loan)	24	(3)
2020–2023	Jeonbuk Hyundai Motors	63	(18)
2023–2024	Al-Ahli	17	(3)
2023–2024	→ Sivasspor (loan)	16	(1)
2024–2025	Abha	12	(1)
2025	Incheon United	35	(3)

International career^{‡}
2015–2022	Gambia	18	(2)
- * Club domestic league appearances and goals as of 06:12, 22 March 2026 (UTC) ‡ National team caps and goals as of 20 May 2024

Modou Secka Barrow (born 13 October 1992) is a Gambian professional footballer who plays for the Gambia national team. He is a winger but can also play as a forward.

He grew up in Sweden where he played for several senior clubs. In 2014, he signed for Swansea City of the Premier League. After loans to three Championship clubs, he transferred to Reading in 2017. Barrow made his international debut for the Gambia national team in 2015.

== Club career ==
=== Early life and Sweden ===
Barrow was born in the Gambia. His mother died when he was just 11. He and his four brothers joined their father in Sweden. He reflected that "Football obviously helped me get through that period of my life. I was very good at football and got a lot of friends at my new school, mainly because many of them really liked to play football with me. I was never bullied because I was from another country."

He spent his youth career at Östers IF and Mjölby AI, before earning his first senior appearances with Mjölby AI. His best friend from Gambia had moved to the town of Mjölby. While visiting his friend, he was invited to train with the club, and quickly caught the eye of the senior squad. This in turn led to a deal with the nearby club IFK Norrköping. After spells at fellow Swedish sides Mjölby Södra IF, IFK Norrköping, and Varbergs BoIS, he joined Swedish second-tier side Östersunds FK in 2014. He scored 10 goals in 19 matches in his only season for them in Superettan.

=== Swansea City ===
On 30 August 2014, Barrow completed his transfer to Premier League side Swansea City for an undisclosed fee, believed to be around £1.5 million, after being signed by manager Garry Monk. He became the first Gambian footballer to play in the Premier League – Omar Koroma spent two seasons at Portsmouth starting in 2008, but failed to make an appearance.

"I like the way Swansea play football, it reminds me of how I used to play back home. I've watched a lot of their matches on TV and I was impressed with what I saw," he said on signing for Swansea. "They like to give young players a chance and hopefully I can progress here." Barrow went straight into the Under-21s squad. On 28 October 2014, Barrow was included on the bench for Swansea's League Cup match against Liverpool. He was assigned the squad number 58.

On 9 November 2014, Barrow made his Swansea City and Premier League debut against Arsenal, coming on in place of Marvin Emnes for the last 23 minutes of a 2–1 home win. He scored his first Swansea goal on 3 January 2015 in a 6–2 win at Tranmere Rovers in the third round of the FA Cup. Barrow signed a new four-year contract until June 2018. Barrow was loaned to Nottingham Forest on 11 March 2015 until the end of the 2014–15 season.

On 10 August 2015, Barrow was loaned to Blackburn Rovers on a three-month emergency loan. On 8 September, he was recalled by Swansea and remained a regular under manager Francesco Guidolin, Barrow scored his first league goal for Swansea in a 3–2 defeat at Bournemouth on 12 March 2016. He signed a new contract at Swansea on 7 July 2016, keeping him at the club until 2019 and also adding a £15 million pound release clause for the player.

Despite playing 20 times for Swansea during the first half of the 2016–17 season under Guidolin and Bob Bradley, after falling out of favour under new manager Paul Clement due to the signing of Luciano Narsingh, Barrow was made available for a transfer. He was strongly linked with a move to Championship side Newcastle United. On 31 January 2017, Barrow joined Leeds United on loan until the end of the 2016–17 season, with a view to a permanent deal. The move saw him link up with Monk. After failing to break into the first team, he was not purchased by Leeds. During his time at Swansea he became the first Gambian to score a Premier League goal.

=== Reading ===
On 21 July 2017, Swansea rejected a bid from Reading in the region of £1.25 million, before Barrow signed a four-year contract with Reading on 3 August for an undisclosed fee. He scored his first goal for Reading in a 2–1 home win against Aston Villa on 15 August.

==== Loan to Denizlispor ====
On 12 August 2019, Denizlispor announced the signing of Barrow on a season-long loan deal, with Reading confirming the deal a day later.

=== Jeonbuk Hyundai Motors ===
On 20 July 2020, Reading confirmed the permanent transfer of Barrow to Jeonbuk Hyundai Motors.

=== Al-Ahli ===
On 16 January 2023, Saudi First Division League club Al Ahli Saudi announced the signing of Barrow from Jeonbuk Hyundai Motors.

==== Loan to Sivasspor ====
On 28 August 2023, Barrow joined Sivasspor on a one-year loan.

=== Abha ===
On 16 September 2024, Saudi First Division League club Abha.

=== Incheon United ===
On 3 February 2025, Barrow joined K League 2 club Incheon United.

== International career ==
On 31 March 2015, Barrow was called up for the Sweden national under-21 football team, however he pulled out of the squad due to an injury he had sustained.

In May 2015, he was called up for the Gambia national football team, and on 22 May, he confirmed on his Twitter account that he had decided to play for his native Gambia. Barrow made his debut for Gambia during the 2017 Africa Cup of Nations qualification in a goalless draw away to South Africa on 13 June 2015.

Barrow scored his first international goal on 27 March 2017, opening a 2–1 friendly win over the Central African Republic in Kenitra, Morocco.

He played in the 2021 Africa cup of Nations, his national team's first continental tournament, where they made a sensational quarter-final.

== Style of play ==
Barrow is a pacey winger, who likes to run with the ball and take on defenders and create chances. He can also play as a forward. He revealed that with his style of play that 'I want to get the fans on their feet, and I fight until the end'.

== Career statistics ==
=== Club ===
As of match played 23 November 2025

Appearances and goals by club, season and competition
Club	Season	League			National cup (Note: Includes FA Cup, Korean FA Cup, Turkish Cup)		League cup (Note: Includes EFL Cup)		Continental		Total	
Club	Season	Division	Apps	Goals	Apps	Goals	Apps	Goals	Apps	Goals	Apps	Goals
Mjölby AI	2010	Östergötland Västra	15	6	0	0	—		—		15	6
Mjölby Södra	2011	Östergötland Västra	19	23	0	0	—		—		19	23
Norrköping	2012	Allsvenskan	7	0	0	0	—		—		7	0
Varbergs BoIS	2013	Superettan	28	2	0	0	—		—		28	2
Östersund	2014	Superettan	19	10	0	0	—		—		19	10
Swansea City	2014–15	Premier League	11	0	2	1	0	0	—		13	1
Swansea City	2015–16	Premier League	22	1	1	0	0	0	—		23	1
Swansea City	2016–17	Premier League	18	0	0	0	1	0	—		19	0
Swansea City	Total		51	1	3	1	1	0	—		55	2
Nottingham Forest (loan)	2014–15	Championship	4	0	0	0	0	0	—		4	0
Blackburn Rovers (loan)	2015–16	Championship	4	0	0	0	1	0	—		5	0
Leeds United (loan)	2016–17	Championship	5	0	0	0	0	0	—		5	0
Reading	2017–18	Championship	41	10	2	0	2	0	—		45	10
Reading	2018–19	Championship	35	4	1	0	1	0	—		37	4
Reading	2019–20	Championship	1	0	0	0	0	0	—		1	0
Reading	Total		77	14	3	0	3	0	—		83	14
Denizlispor (loan)	2019–20	Süper Lig	24	3	0	0	—		—		24	3
Jeonbuk Hyundai Motors	2020	K League 1	15	2	3	0	—		4 (Note: Appearances in AFC Champions League)	0	22	2
Jeonbuk Hyundai Motors	2021	K League 1	20	3	0	0	—		6	6	26	9
Jeonbuk Hyundai Motors	2022	K League 1	28	13	3	1	—		9	1	40	15
Jeonbuk Hyundai Motors	Total		63	18	6	1	—		19	7	88	26
Al-Ahli	2022–23	Saudi First Division League	17	3	—		—		—		17	3
Sivasspor (loan)	2023–24	Süper Lig	11	1	1	0	—		—		12	1
Incheon United	2025	K League 2	35	3	0	0	—		—		35	3
Career total			379	84	13	2	5	0	19	7	416	93

=== International ===
Appearances and goals by national team and year
National team	Year	Apps	Goals
Gambia	2015	3	0
Gambia	2016	2	0
Gambia	2017	2	1
Gambia	2018	1	0
Gambia	2019	3	0
Gambia	2020	1	1
Total		12	2

As of match played 16 November 2020
Scores and results list Gambia's goal tally first, score column indicates score after each Barrow goal.

List of international goals scored by Modou Barrow
No.	Date	Venue	Opponent	Score	Result	Competition
1	27 March 2017	Stade Municipal, Kenitra, Morocco	Central African Republic	1–0	2–1	Friendly
2	16 November 2020	Independence Stadium, Bakau, Gambia	Gabon	2–0	2–1	2021 Africa Cup of Nations qualification

== Honours ==
Jeonbuk Hyundai Motors

- K League 1: 2020, 2021
- Korean FA Cup: 2020, 2022

Al-Ahli

- Saudi First Division League: 2022–23

Incheon United

- K League 2: 2025
