= 2014–15 Swansea City A.F.C. season =

Swansea City
2014–15 season
- Chairman: Huw Jenkins
- Manager: Garry Monk
- Stadium: Liberty Stadium
- Premier League: 8th
- FA Cup: Fourth round
- League Cup: Fourth round
- Top goalscorer: League: Wilfried Bony (9); All: Bafétimbi Gomis (10)
- Highest home attendance: 20,828 vs. Liverpool (16 March 2015, Premier League)
- Lowest home attendance: 12,987 vs. Rotherham United (26 August 2014, Football League Cup)
- Average home league attendance: 20,555
| Home colours | Away colours |

The 2014–15 season was Swansea City's 95th season in the English football league system, and their fourth consecutive season in the Premier League. They also competed in the FA Cup and the Football League Cup.

== Squad and coaching staff information ==
=== First team squad ===
| N | Pos. | Nat. | Name | Age | EU | Since | App | Goals | Ends | Transfer fee | Notes |
|---|---|---|---|---|---|---|---|---|---|---|---|
| 1 | GK | (Poland) | Łukasz Fabiański | 30 | EU | 2014 | 38 | 0 | 2018 | Free | |
| 2 | DF | (Spain) | Jordi Amat | 24 | EU | 2013 | 42 | 0 | 2017 | £2,500,000 | |
| 3 | DF | (Wales) | Neil Taylor | 26 | EU | 2010 | 131 | 0 | 2019 | £150,000 | |
| 4 | MF | (South Korea) | Ki Sung-yueng | 26 | Non-EU | 2012 | 76 | 8 | 2018 | £5,500,000 | |
| 6 | DF | (Wales) (England) | Ashley Williams | 30 | EU | 2008 | 316 | 12 | 2018 | £400,000 | Captain |
| 7 | MF | (England) | Leon Britton | 32 | EU | 2011 | 476 | 17 | 2017 | Undisclosed | Appearances excluding FAW Premier Cup |
| 8 | MF | (England) | Jonjo Shelvey | 23 | EU | 2013 | 77 | 9 | 2017 | £5,000,000 | |
| 11 | FW | (Netherlands) | Marvin Emnes | 26 | EU | 2014 | 34 | 5 | 2017 | Undisclosed | |
| 12 | MF | (England) | Nathan Dyer | 27 | EU | 2009 | 269 | 30 | 2017 | £400,000 | |
| 13 | GK | (Wales) | David Cornell | 24 | EU | 2009 | 1 | 0 | 2015 | Youth system | |
| 14 | MF | (England) | Tom Carroll | 22 | EU | 2014 | 18 | 1 | 2015 | Loan | |
| 15 | MF | (England) | Wayne Routledge | 30 | EU | 2011 | 153 | 16 | 2018 | Undisclosed | |
| 17 | FW | (Portugal) | Nélson Oliveira | 23 | EU | 2015 | 11 | 1 | 2015 | Loan | |
| 18 | FW | (France) | Bafétimbi Gomis | 29 | EU | 2014 | 36 | 10 | 2018 | Free | |
| 19 | DF | (Netherlands) (Suriname) | Dwight Tiendalli | 29 | EU | 2013 | 46 | 1 | 2016 | Free | |
| 20 | MF | (Ecuador) | Jefferson Montero | 25 | Non-EU | 2014 | 33 | 1 | 2018 | Undisclosed | |
| 21 | MF | (England) | Matt Grimes | 19 | EU | 2015 | 3 | 0 | 2019 | Undisclosed | |
| 22 | DF | (Spain) | Àngel Rangel | 32 | EU | 2007 | 320 | 9 | 2017 | Undisclosed | |
| 23 | MF | (Iceland) | Gylfi Sigurðsson | 25 | EU | 2014 | 53 | 16 | 2018 | Undisclosed | |
| 24 | MF | (England) | Jack Cork | 25 | EU | 2015 | 15 | 1 | 2018 | Undisclosed | |
| 25 | GK | (Germany) | Gerhard Tremmel | 36 | EU | 2011 | 52 | 0 | 2015 | Free | |
| 26 | DF | (England) | Kyle Naughton | 26 | EU | 2015 | 10 | 0 | 2018 | Undisclosed | |
| 27 | DF | (England) | Kyle Bartley | 24 | EU | 2012 | 18 | 0 | 2017 | £1,000,000 | |
| 29 | DF | (Wales) | Jazz Richards | 24 | EU | 2009 | 51 | 0 | 2016 | Youth system | |
| 33 | DF | (Argentina) | Federico Fernández | 26 | Non-EU | 2014 | 32 | 0 | 2018 | Undisclosed | |
| 46 | MF | (Netherlands) | Kenji Gorré | 20 | EU | 2013 | 1 | 0 | 2016 | Free | |
| 53 | MF | (Scotland) | Adam King | 19 | EU | 2014 (Winter) | 1 | 0 | 2017 | Undisclosed | |
| 56 | MF | (Scotland) | Jay Fulton | 21 | EU | 2014 (Winter) | 7 | 0 | 2018 | Undisclosed | |
| 58 | FW | (The Gambia) | Modou Barrow | 22 | EU | 2014 | 13 | 1 | 2018 | Undisclosed | |

Updated to match played 17 May 2015
Source: Swansea City A.F.C.
Ordered by 2014–15 squad numbers.

== Transfers & loans ==
=== Transfer in ===
| Player | Pos. | Moving from | Date | Contract | Transfer fee | Ref. |
|---|---|---|---|---|---|---|
| (Poland) Łukasz Fabiański | GK | (England) Arsenal | 29 May 2014^{†} | 4 years | Free | |
| (France) Bafétimbi Gomis | FW | (France) Olympique Lyonnais | 27 June 2014 | 4 years | Free | |
| (Scotland) Stephen Kingsley | DF | (Scotland) Falkirk | 30 June 2014 | 3 years | Undisclosed | |
| (Netherlands) Marvin Emnes | FW | (England) Middlesbrough | 2 July 2014 | 3 years | Undisclosed | |
| (Iceland) Gylfi Sigurðsson | MF | (England) Tottenham Hotspur | 23 July 2014 | 4 years | Undisclosed | |
| (Ecuador) Jefferson Montero | MF | (Mexico) Monarcas Morelia | 24 July 2014 | 4 years | Undisclosed | |
| (Sweden) Adnan Marić | MF | (Sweden) GAIS | 8 August 2014 | 2 years | Undisclosed | |
| (Wales) Daniel James | MF | (England) Hull City | 8 August 2014 | Scholarship | Undisclosed | |
| (Argentina) Federico Fernández | DF | (Italy) Napoli | 20 August 2014 | 4 years | Undisclosed | |
| (Cyprus) James Demetriou | FW | (England) Nottingham Forest | 29 August 2014 | 2 years | Free | |
| (Australia) Giancarlo Gallifuoco | MF | (England) Tottenham Hotspur | 29 August 2014 | 1 year | Free | |
| (The Gambia) Modou Barrow | FW | (Sweden) Östersunds FK | 1 September 2014 | Performance-related | Undisclosed | |
| (England) Matt Grimes | MF | (England) Exeter City | 2 January 2015 | 4.5 years | Undisclosed | |
| (England) Kyle Naughton | DF | (England) Tottenham Hotspur | 22 January 2015 | 3.5 years | £5,000,000 | |
| (England) Jack Cork | MF | (England) Southampton | 30 January 2015 | 3.5 years | Undisclosed | |

^{†} effective 1 July 2014

=== Transfer out ===
| Player | Pos. | Moving to | Date | Transfer fee | Ref. |
|---|---|---|---|---|---|
| (England) Leroy Lita | FW | (England) Barnsley | 12 May 2014 | End of contract | |
| (France) David Ngog | FW | (France) Stade de Reims | 12 May 2014 | End of contract | |
| (Spain) Óscar Sielva | MF | (Spain) Olot | 12 May 2014 | End of contract | |
| (France) Darnel Situ | DF | (Denmark) AGF | 12 May 2014 | End of contract | |
| (Spain) Pau Morer Vicente | MF | (Spain) Girona | 12 May 2014 | End of contract | |
| (England) Jernade Meade | DF | (England) Hadley | 23 May 2014 | End of contract | |
| (Wales) Gwion Edwards | MF | (England) Crawley Town | 11 July 2014 | Undisclosed | |
| (Wales) Ben Davies | DF | (England) Tottenham Hotspur | 23 July 2014 | Undisclosed | |
| (Netherlands) Michel Vorm | GK | (England) Tottenham Hotspur | 23 July 2014 | Undisclosed | |
| (Spain) Alejandro Pozuelo | MF | (Spain) Rayo Vallecano | 24 July 2014 | Undisclosed | |
| (Spain) Chico Flores | DF | (Qatar) Lekhwiya | 14 August 2014 | Undisclosed | |
| (Spain) Pablo Hernández | MF | (Qatar) Al-Arabi | 14 August 2014 | Undisclosed | |
| (Spain) José Cañas | MF | (Spain) Espanyol | 1 September 2014 | Free | |
| (United States) Kris Scott | MF | (England) Leicester City | 1 September 2014 | Free | |
| (Ivory Coast) Wilfried Bony | FW | (England) Manchester City | 14 January 2015 | £28,000,000 | |

=== Loan in ===
| Player | Pos. | Loaned from | Date | Expires | Ref. |
|---|---|---|---|---|---|
| (England) Tom Carroll | MF | (England) Tottenham Hotspur | 22 August 2014 | 30 June 2015 | |
| (Portugal) Nélson Oliveira | FW | (Portugal) Benfica | 23 December 2014^{‡} | 30 June 2015 | |

^{‡} Officially signed on 1 January 2015.

=== Loan out ===
| Player | Pos. | Loaned to | Date | Expires | Ref. |
|---|---|---|---|---|---|
| (Wales) Thomas Atyeo | DF | (Wales) Aberystwyth Town | 23 June 2014 | 5 September 2014 | |
| (Wales) Daniel Alfei | DF | (England) Northampton Town | 2 July 2014 | 2 January 2015 | |
| (Spain) Michu | FW | (Italy) Napoli | 17 July 2014 | 30 June 2015 | |
| (Wales) Alex Bray | MF | (England) Plymouth Argyle | 1 September 2014 | 9 September 2014 | |
| (England) Alan Tate | DF | (England) Crewe Alexandra | 24 September 2014 | 24 December 2014 | |
| (Wales) Scott Tancock | DF | (Wales) Newport County | 26 September 2014 | 20 November 2014 | |
| (Wales) James Loveridge | FW | (Wales) Newport County | 2 October 2014 | 20 November 2014 | |
| (England) Curtis Obeng | DF | (Wales) Newport County | 23 October 2014 | 17 December 2014 | |
| (Wales) Scott Tancock | DF | (Wales) Wrexham | 21 November 2014 | 18 December 2014 | |
| (England) Alan Tate | DF | (England) Crewe Alexandra | 5 January 2015 | 30 June 2015 | |
| (Northern Ireland) Rory Donnelly | FW | (England) Tranmere Rovers | 8 January 2015 | 30 June 2015 | |
| (Wales) Ryan Hedges | FW | (England) Leyton Orient | 16 January 2015 | 30 June 2015 | |
| (Wales) Liam Shephard | DF | (England) Yeovil Town | 17 January 2015 | 30 June 2015 | |
| (Wales) Jazz Richards | DF | (England) Fulham | 24 January 2015 | 7 May 2015 | |
| (Wales) Josh Sheehan | MF | (England) Yeovil Town | 17 February 2015 | 30 June 2015 | |
| (Scotland) Stephen Kingsley | DF | (England) Yeovil Town | 18 February 2015 | 30 June 2015 | |
| (The Gambia) Modou Barrow | MF | (England) Nottingham Forest | 12 March 2015 | 26 April 2015 | |
| (Wales) David Cornell | GK | (England) Portsmouth | 17 March 2015 | 15 April 2015 | |
| (Netherlands) Dwight Tiendalli | DF | (England) Middlesbrough | 26 March 2015 | 7 May 2015 | |

=== New contracts ===
| No. | Pos. | Player | Date | Contract length | Expires | Ref. |
|---|---|---|---|---|---|---|
| 7 | MF | (England) Leon Britton | 4 June 2014 | 3 years | June 2018 | |
| 56 | MF | (Scotland) Jay Fulton | 30 June 2014 | 4 years | June 2017 | |
| 46 | MF | (Netherlands) Kenji Gorré | 2 July 2014 | 2 years | June 2016 | |
| 6 | DF | (Wales) Ashley Williams | 4 July 2014 | 4 years | June 2018 | |
| 27 | DF | (England) Kyle Bartley | 5 July 2014 | 3 years | June 2017 | |
| 4 | MF | (South Korea) Ki Sung-yueng | 28 August 2014 | 4 years | June 2018 | |
| 15 | MF | (England) Wayne Routledge | 25 September 2014 | Extension | June 2018 | |
| 10 | FW | (Ivory Coast) Wilfried Bony | 19 November 2014 | Extension | June 2018 | |
| 32 | DF | (Wales) Liam Shephard | 5 January 2015 | 2.5 years | June 2017 | |
| 58 | FW | (The Gambia) Modou Barrow | 7 January 2015 | 4 years | June 2018 | |
| 22 | DF | (Spain) Àngel Rangel | 10 March 2015 | Extension | June 2017 | |
| 55 | DF | (England) Raheem Hanley | 15 April 2015 | 1 year | June 2016 | |
| | FW | (Wales) Owain Jones | 27 May 2015 | 2 years | June 2017 | |
| | MF | (Wales) Kyle Copp | 27 May 2015 | 1 year | June 2016 | |
| | MF | (Northern Ireland) Stephen Fallon | 27 May 2015 | 1 year | June 2016 | |
| 52 | DF | (Wales) Connor Roberts | 29 May 2015 | 2 years | June 2017 | |
| 3 | DF | (Wales) Neil Taylor | 1 June 2015 | 4 years | June 2019 | |
| 44 | MF | (Wales) Sam Evans | 1 June 2015 | 1 year | June 2016 | |
| 50 | FW | (Wales) Ryan Hedges | 9 June 2015 | Extension | June 2018 | |

== Pre-season & friendlies ==
Swansea's pre-season preparations began by travelling to Chicago for a two-week training camp. Their first pre-season match came against Mexican side Guadalajara at Miller Park on 16 July. The game finished 1–1, with Nathan Dyer scoring Swansea's goal in the 57th minute. Neil Taylor and Guadalajara's Jesús Sánchez García were both sent off in the 80th minute. Three days later Swansea faced NASL side Minnesota United in Blaine, losing the game 2–0.

Following the conclusion of the US tour, Swansea's next game came against League Two side Plymouth Argyle. The Swans won the match 4–0, courtesy of goals from Rory Donnelly, Jordi Amat, and two goals from new signing Gylfi Sigurðsson. A couple of days later, Swansea registered their second win of their pre-season with a 2–0 win over Exeter City. The goals were scored by Bafétimbi Gomis and Josh Sheehan.

A mixture of youth and first team players faced Bournemouth on 1 August, which saw Swansea defeated 3–1. Swansea's new Ecuadorian winger Jefferson Montero scored their only goal in the 68th minute. The following day, Swansea travelled to the Madejski Stadium to face Championship side Reading. Swansea ran out 3–1 winners. Wayne Routledge scored two goals in two minutes in the first half, and Gomis scored Swansea's third in the 65th minute.

On 9 August, Swansea's final pre-season friendly saw them face La Liga side Villarreal at the Liberty Stadium. They lost the match 3–0, with goals coming from Ikechukwu Uche, Bruno Soriano and Denis Cheryshev.

Win Draw Loss Postponed

| 16 July 2014 Friendly | Swansea City | 1–1 | Guadalajara | Milwaukee, Wisconsin |
| 20:00 CDT (UTC−06:00) | Dyer 57' | Report | Hernández 90' (pen.) | Stadium: Miller Park; Attendance: 31,237; Referee: Andres Pfefferkorn |

| 19 July 2014 Friendly | Minnesota United | 2–0 | Swansea City | Blaine, Minnesota |
| 19:00 CDT (UTC−06:00) | Davis 7'; Jordan 44' | Report | | Stadium: National Sports Center; Attendance: 9,064 |

| 27 July 2014 Friendly | Plymouth Argyle | 0–4 | Swansea City | Plymouth |
| 17:00 BST (UTC+01:00) | | Report | Donnelly 9'; Amat 69'; Sigurðsson 72', 90+2' | Stadium: Home Park; Attendance: 4,943 |

| 29 July 2014 Friendly | Exeter City | 0–2 | Swansea City | Exeter |
| 19:15 BST (UTC+01:00) | | Report | Gomis 31'; Sheehan 78' | Stadium: St James Park; Attendance: 2,274; Referee: Oli Langford |

| 1 August 2014 Friendly | Bournemouth | 3–1 | Swansea City | Bournemouth |
| 19:30 BST (UTC+01:00) | Pugh 28', 45'; Pitman 53' (pen.) | Report | Montero 68' | Stadium: Dean Court; Attendance: 2,859 |

| 2 August 2014 Friendly | Reading | 1–3 | Swansea City | Reading |
| 15:00 BST (UTC+01:00) | Blackman 43' | Report | Routledge 23', 25'; Gomis 65' | Stadium: Madejski Stadium; Attendance: 5,421 |

| 9 August 2014 Friendly | Swansea City | 0–3 | Villarreal | Swansea |
| 15:00 BST (UTC+01:00) | | Report | Uche 3'; Soriano 51'; Cheryshev 58' | Stadium: Liberty Stadium; Attendance: 12,529 |

== Competition ==
=== Overall ===
| Competition | Started round | Current position / round | Final position / round | First match | Last match |
|---|---|---|---|---|---|
| Premier League | — | — | 8th | 16 August 2014 | 24 May 2015 |
| FA Cup | Third round | — | Fourth round | 3 January 2015 | 24 January 2015 |
| League Cup | Second round | — | Fourth round | 26 August 2014 | 28 October 2014 |

Updated to match played 24 May 2015
Source: Competitions

=== Premier League ===
==== League table ====
| Pos | Team | Pld | W | D | L | GF | GA | GD | Pts | Qualification or relegation |
|---|---|---|---|---|---|---|---|---|---|---|
| 6 | Liverpool | 38 | 18 | 8 | 12 | 52 | 48 | +4 | 62 | Qualification for the Europa League group stage (Note: Since winners of the 2014–15 FA Cup, Arsenal, and winners of the 2014–15 Football League Cup, Chelsea, qualified for the Champions League based on league position, the spot awarded to the FA Cup winners (Europa League group stage) was passed to the sixth-placed team, Liverpool, and the spot awarded to the League Cup winners (Europa League third qualifying round) was passed to the seventh-placed team, Southampton, since those teams were the first teams in the table not already qualified for any European competition.) |
| 7 | Southampton | 38 | 18 | 6 | 14 | 54 | 33 | +21 | 60 | Qualification for the Europa League third qualifying round |
| 8 | Swansea City | 38 | 16 | 8 | 14 | 46 | 49 | −3 | 56 | |
| 9 | Stoke City | 38 | 15 | 9 | 14 | 48 | 45 | +3 | 54 | |
| 10 | Crystal Palace | 38 | 13 | 9 | 16 | 47 | 51 | −4 | 48 | |

Source: Barclays Premier League
Rules for classification: 1) Points; 2) Goal difference; 3) Goals scored; 4) Play-offs (only if needed to decide champion, teams for relegation or teams for UEFA competitions).

==== Results summary ====
| Overall | | | | | | | | Home | | | | | | Away | | | | | |
| Pld | W | D | L | GF | GA | GD | Pts | W | D | L | GF | GA | GD | W | D | L | GF | GA | GD |
|---|---|---|---|---|---|---|---|---|---|---|---|---|---|---|---|---|---|---|---|
| 38 | 16 | 8 | 14 | 46 | 49 | −3 | 56 | 9 | 5 | 5 | 27 | 22 | +5 | 7 | 3 | 9 | 19 | 27 | −8 |

Last updated: 24 May 2015.
Source: Premier League

==== Results by matchday ====
| Matchday | 1 | 2 | 3 | 4 | 5 | 6 | 7 | 8 | 9 | 10 | 11 | 12 | 13 | 14 | 15 | 16 | 17 | 18 | 19 | 20 | 21 | 22 | 23 | 24 | 25 | 26 | 27 | 28 | 29 | 30 | 31 | 32 | 33 | 34 | 35 | 36 | 37 | 38 |
|---|---|---|---|---|---|---|---|---|---|---|---|---|---|---|---|---|---|---|---|---|---|---|---|---|---|---|---|---|---|---|---|---|---|---|---|---|---|---|
| Ground | A | H | H | A | H | A | H | A | H | A | H | A | H | H | A | H | A | H | A | A | H | H | A | H | A | H | A | A | H | A | H | H | A | A | H | A | H | A |
| Result | W | W | W | L | L | D | D | L | W | D | W | L | D | W | L | L | W | W | L | D | D | L | W | D | L | W | W | L | L | W | W | D | L | W | W | W | L | L |
| Position | 1 | 2 | 2 | 3 | 5 | 5 | 4 | 8 | 6 | 6 | 5 | 7 | 7 | 6 | 8 | 9 | 8 | 8 | 9 | 9 | 9 | 9 | 9 | 9 | 9 | 9 | 8 | 9 | 9 | 8 | 8 | 8 | 8 | 8 | 8 | 8 | 8 | 8 |

Updated to match(es) played on 24 May 2015. Source: Statto.com
A = Away; H = Home; W = Win; D = Draw; L = Loss

==== Matches ====
Win Draw Loss

| 16 August 2014 1 | Manchester United | 1–2 | Swansea City | Manchester |
| 12:45 BST (UTC+01:00) | Rooney 53' | Report | Ki 28'; Sigurðsson 72' | Stadium: Old Trafford; Attendance: 75,339; Referee: Mike Dean |

| 23 August 2014 2 | Swansea City | 1–0 | Burnley | Swansea |
| 15:00 BST (UTC+01:00) | Dyer 23' | Report | | Stadium: Liberty Stadium; Attendance: 20,565; Referee: Craig Pawson |

| 30 August 2014 3 | Swansea City | 3–0 | West Bromwich Albion | Swansea |
| 15:00 BST (UTC+01:00) | Dyer 2', 71'; Routledge 24' | Report | | Stadium: Liberty Stadium; Attendance: 20,318; Referee: Paul Tierney |

| 13 September 2014 4 | Chelsea | 4–2 | Swansea City | Fulham |
| 15:00 BST (UTC+01:00) | Costa 45', 56', 67'; Rémy 81' | Report | Terry 11' (o.g.); Shelvey 86' | Stadium: Stamford Bridge; Attendance: 41,400; Referee: Kevin Friend |

| 20 September 2014 5 | Swansea City | 0–1 | Southampton | Swansea |
| 15:00 BST (UTC+01:00) | Bony (yellow card) 20' (yellow-red card) 39' | Report | Wanyama 80' | Stadium: Liberty Stadium; Attendance: 20,596; Referee: Jonathan Moss |

| 27 September 2014 6 | Sunderland | 0–0 | Swansea City | Sunderland |
| 15:00 BST (UTC+01:00) | | Report | Rangel (yellow card) 60' (yellow-red card) 81' | Stadium: Stadium of Light; Attendance: 41,325; Referee: Chris Foy |

| 4 October 2014 7 | Swansea City | 2–2 | Newcastle United | Swansea |
| 15:00 BST (UTC+01:00) | Bony 17'; Routledge 50' | Report | Cissé 43', 75' | Stadium: Liberty Stadium; Attendance: 20,622; Referee: Lee Mason |

| 19 October 2014 8 | Stoke City | 2–1 | Swansea City | Stoke-on-Trent |
| 16:00 BST (UTC+01:00) | Adam 43' (pen.); Walters 76' | Report | Bony 34' (pen.) | Stadium: Britannia Stadium; Attendance: 27,017; Referee: Michael Oliver |

| 25 October 2014 9 | Swansea City | 2–0 | Leicester City | Swansea |
| 17:30 BST (UTC+01:00) | Bony 34', 57' | Report | | Stadium: Liberty Stadium; Attendance: 20,259; Referee: Mike Jones |

| 1 November 2014 10 | Everton | 0–0 | Swansea City | Liverpool |
| 15:00 GMT (UTC+00:00) | | Report | Shelvey (yellow card) 24' (yellow-red card) 72' | Stadium: Goodison Park; Attendance: 39,149; Referee: Kevin Friend |

| 9 November 2014 11 | Swansea City | 2–1 | Arsenal | Swansea |
| 16:00 GMT (UTC+00:00) | Sigurðsson 75'; Gomis 78' | Report | Sánchez 63' | Stadium: Liberty Stadium; Attendance: 20,812; Referee: Phil Dowd |

| 22 November 2014 12 | Manchester City | 2–1 | Swansea City | Manchester |
| 15:00 GMT (UTC+00:00) | Jovetić 19'; Touré 62' | Report | Bony 9' | Stadium: Etihad Stadium; Attendance: 45,448; Referee: Neil Swarbrick |

| 29 November 2014 13 | Swansea City | 1–1 | Crystal Palace | Swansea |
| 15:00 GMT (UTC+00:00) | Bony 15' | Report | Jedinak 25' (pen.) | Stadium: Liberty Stadium; Attendance: 20,240; Referee: Martin Atkinson |

| 2 December 2014 14 | Swansea City | 2–0 | Queens Park Rangers | Swansea |
| 19:45 GMT (UTC+00:00) | Ki 78'; Routledge 83' | Report | | Stadium: Liberty Stadium; Attendance: 20,145; Referee: Kevin Friend |

| 7 December 2014 15 | West Ham United | 3–1 | Swansea City | Upton Park |
| 13:30 GMT (UTC+00:00) | Carroll 41', 66'; Sakho 87' | Report | Bony 19'; Fabiański (red card) 68' | Stadium: Boleyn Ground; Attendance: 34,125; Referee: Chris Foy |

| 14 December 2014 16 | Swansea City | 1–2 | Tottenham Hotspur | Swansea |
| 16:00 GMT (UTC+00:00) | Bony 48' | Report | Kane 4'; Eriksen 89' | Stadium: Liberty Stadium; Attendance: 20,650; Referee: Robert Madley |

| 20 December 2014 17 | Hull City | 0–1 | Swansea City | Kingston upon Hull |
| 15:00 GMT (UTC+00:00) | | Report | Ki 15' | Stadium: KC Stadium; Attendance: 21,913; Referee: Mark Clattenburg |

| 26 December 2014 18 | Swansea City | 1–0 | Aston Villa | Swansea |
| 15:00 GMT (UTC+00:00) | Sigurðsson 13' | Report | | Stadium: Liberty Stadium; Attendance: 20,683; Referee: Roger East |

| 29 December 2014 19 | Liverpool | 4–1 | Swansea City | Liverpool |
| 20:00 GMT (UTC+00:00) | Moreno 33'; Lallana 51', 61'; Shelvey 69' (o.g.) | Report | Sigurðsson 52' | Stadium: Anfield; Attendance: 44,714; Referee: Andre Marriner |

| 1 January 2015 20 | Queens Park Rangers | 1–1 | Swansea City | Shepherd's Bush |
| 15:00 GMT (UTC+00:00) | Fer 20' | Report | Bony 90' | Stadium: Loftus Road; Attendance: 17,729; Referee: Anthony Taylor |

| 10 January 2015 21 | Swansea City | 1–1 | West Ham United | Swansea |
| 15:00 GMT (UTC+00:00) | Noble 74' (o.g.) | Report | Carroll 43' | Stadium: Liberty Stadium; Attendance: 20,745; Referee: Mike Dean |

| 17 January 2015 22 | Swansea City | 0–5 | Chelsea | Swansea |
| 15:00 GMT (UTC+00:00) | | Report | Oscar 1', 36'; Costa 20', 34'; Schürrle 79' | Stadium: Liberty Stadium; Attendance: 20,785; Referee: Jonathan Moss |

| 1 February 2015 23 | Southampton | 0–1 | Swansea City | Southampton |
| 16:00 GMT (UTC+00:00) | Bertrand (red card) 89' | Report | Shelvey 83' | Stadium: St Mary's Stadium; Attendance: 30,943; Referee: Michael Oliver |

| 7 February 2015 24 | Swansea City | 1–1 | Sunderland | Swansea |
| 15:00 GMT (UTC+00:00) | Ki 66' | Report | Defoe 42' | Stadium: Liberty Stadium; Attendance: 20,355; Referee: Phil Dowd |

| 11 February 2015 25 | West Bromwich Albion | 2–0 | Swansea City | West Bromwich |
| 20:00 GMT (UTC+00:00) | Ideye 60'; Berahino 74' | Report | | Stadium: The Hawthorns; Attendance: 23,516; Referee: Robert Madley |

| 21 February 2015 26 | Swansea City | 2–1 | Manchester United | Swansea |
| 15:00 GMT (UTC+00:00) | Ki 30'; Gomis 73' | Report | Herrera 28' | Stadium: Liberty Stadium; Attendance: 20,809; Referee: Neil Swarbrick |

| 28 February 2015 27 | Burnley | 0–1 | Swansea City | Burnley |
| 15:00 GMT (UTC+00:00) | | Report | Trippier 64' (o.g.) | Stadium: Turf Moor; Attendance: 17,388; Referee: Jonathan Moss |

| 4 March 2015 28 | Tottenham Hotspur | 3–2 | Swansea City | Tottenham |
| 19:45 GMT (UTC+00:00) | Chadli 7'; Mason 51'; Townsend 60' | Report | Ki 19'; Sigurðsson 89' | Stadium: White Hart Lane; Attendance: 34,008; Referee: Michael Oliver |

| 16 March 2015 29 | Swansea City | 0–1 | Liverpool | Swansea |
| 20:00 GMT (UTC+00:00) | | Report | Henderson 68' | Stadium: Liberty Stadium; Attendance: 20,828; Referee: Roger East |

| 21 March 2015 30 | Aston Villa | 0–1 | Swansea City | Birmingham |
| 15:00 GMT (UTC+00:00) | | Report | Gomis 87' | Stadium: Villa Park; Attendance: 35,598; Referee: Robert Madley |

| 4 April 2015 31 | Swansea City | 3–1 | Hull City | Swansea |
| 15:00 BST (UTC+01:00) | Ki 18'; Gomis 37', 90+1' | Report | McShane 50'; Meyler (red card) 53' | Stadium: Liberty Stadium; Attendance: 20,333; Referee: Andre Marriner |

| 11 April 2015 32 | Swansea City | 1–1 | Everton | Swansea |
| 12:45 BST (UTC+01:00) | Shelvey 69' (pen.) | Report | Lennon 41' | Stadium: Liberty Stadium; Attendance: 20,468; Referee: Michael Oliver |

| 18 April 2015 33 | Leicester City | 2–0 | Swansea City | Leicester |
| 15:00 BST (UTC+01:00) | Ulloa 15'; King 89' | Report | | Stadium: King Power Stadium; Attendance: 31,121; Referee: Lee Probert |

| 25 April 2015 34 | Newcastle United | 2–3 | Swansea City | Newcastle upon Tyne |
| 15:00 BST (UTC+01:00) | Pérez 20' de Jong 87' | Report | Oliveira 45+2'; Sigurðsson 49'; Cork 71' | Stadium: St James' Park; Attendance: 46,884; Referee: Neil Swarbrick |

| 2 May 2015 35 | Swansea City | 2–0 | Stoke City | Swansea |
| 15:00 BST (UTC+01:00) | Montero 76'; Ki 90+2' | Report | Wilson (yellow card) 62' (yellow-red card) 84' | Stadium: Liberty Stadium; Attendance: 20,661; Referee: Craig Pawson |

| 11 May 2015 36 | Arsenal | 0–1 | Swansea City | Holloway |
| 20:00 BST (UTC+01:00) | | Report | Gomis 85' | Stadium: Emirates Stadium; Attendance: 59,989; Referee: Kevin Friend |

| 17 May 2015 37 | Swansea City | 2–4 | Manchester City | Swansea |
| 13:30 BST (UTC+01:00) | Sigurðsson 45'; Gomis 64' | Report | Touré 21', 74'; Milner 36'; Bony 90+2' | Stadium: Liberty Stadium; Attendance: 20,669; Referee: Mark Clattenburg |

| 24 May 2015 38 | Crystal Palace | 1–0 | Swansea City | Selhurst |
| 15:00 BST (UTC+01:00) | Chamakh 57' | Report | | Stadium: Selhurst Park; Attendance: 25,076; Referee: Craig Pawson |

Source: Swansea City A.F.C.

=== FA Cup ===
Win Draw Loss Postponed

| 3 January 2015 Third round | Tranmere Rovers | 2–6 | Swansea City | Birkenhead |
| 15:00 GMT (UTC+00:00) | Power 70'; Stockton 83' | Report | Dyer 34'; Carroll 49'; Barrow 58'; Gomis 77', 90+4'; Routledge 85' | Stadium: Prenton Park; Attendance: 10,007; Referee: Paul Tierney |

| 24 January 2015 Fourth round | Blackburn Rovers | 3–1 | Swansea City | Blackburn |
| 12:45 GMT (UTC+00:00) | Taylor 23'; Gestede 78'; Conway 89' | Report | Bartley (red card) 7'; Sigurðsson 21' (red card) 90+2' | Stadium: Ewood Park; Attendance: 5,928; Referee: Craig Pawson |

Source: Swansea City A.F.C.

=== League Cup ===
Win Draw Loss Postponed

Swansea will enter the League Cup in the second round as one of the thirteen Premier League clubs not involved in European competition. They were drawn against Rotherham United at home. Gomis scored his first competitive goal for the Swans in the 22nd minute, in a 1–0 win. In the third round, Swansea were drawn to face fellow Premier League side Everton. Swansea recorded their first ever win over Everton to reach the fourth round of the Capital One Cup.

| 26 August 2014 Second round | Swansea City | 1–0 | Rotherham United | Swansea |
| 19:45 BST (UTC+01:00) | Gomis 22' | Report | | Stadium: Liberty Stadium; Attendance: 12,987; Referee: Stephen Martin |

| 23 September 2014 Third round | Swansea City | 3–0 | Everton | Swansea |
| 19:45 BST (UTC+01:00) | Dyer 28'; Sigurðsson 64'; Emnes 87' | Report | | Stadium: Liberty Stadium; Attendance: 20,397; Referee: Roger East |

| 28 October 2014 Fourth round | Liverpool | 2–1 | Swansea City | Liverpool |
| 20:00 GMT (UTC+00:00) | Balotelli 86'; Lovren 90+5' | Report | Emnes 65'; Fernández (red card) 90' | Stadium: Anfield; Attendance: 42,582; Referee: Keith Stroud |

Source: Swansea City A.F.C.

== Statistics ==
=== Appearances, goals and cards ===
Last updated on 24 May 2015

| No. | Pos | Player | Premier League | | | FA Cup | | | League Cup | | | Total | | | Discipline | |
| No. | Pos | Player | Starts | Sub | Goals | Starts | Sub | Goals | Starts | Sub | Goals | Starts | Sub | Goals | Booked | Sent off (straight red) |
|---|---|---|---|---|---|---|---|---|---|---|---|---|---|---|---|---|
| 1 | GK | (Poland) Łukasz Fabiański | 37 | 0 | 0 | 1 | 0 | 0 | – | – | – | 38 | 0 | 0 | – | 1 |
| 2 | DF | (Spain) Jordi Amat | 7 | 3 | 0 | 2 | 0 | 0 | – | – | – | 9 | 3 | 0 | 3 | – |
| 3 | DF | (Wales) Neil Taylor | 34 | 0 | 0 | – | – | – | 2 | 0 | 0 | 36 | 0 | 0 | 10 | – |
| 4 | MF | (South Korea) Ki Sung-yueng | 30 | 3 | 8 | – | – | – | 0 | 1 | 0 | 30 | 4 | 8 | 4 | – |
| 6 | DF | (Wales) Ashley Williams | 37 | 0 | 0 | – | – | – | 2 | 0 | 0 | 39 | 0 | 0 | 7 | – |
| 7 | MF | (England) Leon Britton | 7 | 2 | 0 | – | – | – | – | – | – | 7 | 2 | 0 | 1 | – |
| 8 | MF | (England) Jonjo Shelvey | 28 | 3 | 3 | 1 | 0 | 0 | 2 | 1 | 0 | 31 | 4 | 3 | 9 | 1 |
| 11 | FW | (Netherlands) Marvin Emnes | 3 | 14 | 0 | 1 | 0 | 0 | 1 | 1 | 2 | 5 | 15 | 2 | 2 | – |
| 12 | MF | (England) Nathan Dyer | 23 | 9 | 3 | 2 | 0 | 1 | 3 | 0 | 1 | 28 | 9 | 5 | 3 | – |
| 14 | MF | (England) Tom Carroll | 8 | 5 | 0 | 2 | 0 | 1 | 2 | 1 | 0 | 12 | 6 | 1 | 2 | – |
| 15 | MF | (England) Wayne Routledge | 27 | 2 | 3 | 0 | 1 | 1 | 0 | 2 | 0 | 27 | 5 | 4 | 1 | 1 |
| 17 | FW | (Portugal) Nélson Oliveira | 4 | 6 | 1 | 0 | 1 | 0 | – | – | – | 4 | 7 | 1 | – | – |
| 18 | FW | (France) Bafétimbi Gomis | 18 | 13 | 7 | 2 | 0 | 2 | 3 | 0 | 1 | 23 | 13 | 10 | – | – |
| 19 | DF | (Netherlands) Dwight Tiendalli | 1 | 2 | 0 | 2 | 0 | 0 | 1 | 0 | 0 | 4 | 2 | 0 | 1 | – |
| 20 | MF | (Ecuador) Jefferson Montero | 15 | 15 | 1 | 0 | 1 | 0 | 3 | 0 | 0 | 18 | 16 | 1 | – | – |
| 21 | MF | (England) Matt Grimes | 0 | 3 | 0 | – | – | – | – | – | – | 0 | 3 | 0 | – | – |
| 22 | DF | (Spain) Àngel Rangel | 22 | 4 | 0 | 1 | 0 | 0 | 1 | 0 | 0 | 24 | 4 | 0 | 1 | 1 |
| 23 | MF | (Iceland) Gylfi Sigurðsson | 32 | 0 | 7 | 1 | 0 | 1 | 1 | 1 | 1 | 34 | 1 | 9 | 2 | 1 |
| 24 | MF | (England) Jack Cork | 15 | 0 | 1 | – | – | – | – | – | – | 15 | 0 | 1 | 1 | – |
| 25 | GK | (Germany) Gerhard Tremmel | 1 | 1 | 0 | 1 | 0 | 0 | 3 | 0 | 0 | 5 | 1 | 0 | – | – |
| 26 | DF | (England) Kyle Naughton | 10 | 0 | 0 | – | – | – | – | – | – | 10 | 0 | 0 | 1 | – |
| 27 | DF | (England) Kyle Bartley | 7 | 0 | 0 | 2 | 0 | 0 | 1 | 0 | 0 | 10 | 0 | 0 | 7 | 1 |
| 29 | MF | (Wales) Jazz Richards | 7 | 3 | 0 | 1 | 0 | 0 | 2 | 0 | 0 | 10 | 3 | 0 | 1 | – |
| 33 | DF | (Argentina) Federico Fernández | 27 | 1 | 0 | 0 | 1 | 0 | 3 | 0 | 0 | 30 | 2 | 0 | 1 | – |
| 46 | MF | (Netherlands) Kenji Gorré | 0 | 1 | 0 | – | – | – | – | – | – | 0 | 1 | 0 | – | – |
| 53 | MF | (Scotland) Adam King | – | – | – | 0 | 1 | 0 | – | – | – | 0 | 1 | 0 | – | – |
| 56 | MF | (Scotland) Jay Fulton | 1 | 1 | 0 | 1 | 0 | 0 | 2 | 0 | 0 | 4 | 1 | 0 | 2 | – |
| 58 | FW | (The Gambia) Modou Barrow | 1 | 10 | 0 | 2 | 0 | 1 | – | – | – | 3 | 10 | 1 | 2 | – |
Players who have made an appearance this season, but are currently away from the club on loan:
| 30 | MF | (Wales) Josh Sheehan | – | – | – | – | – | – | 1 | 0 | 0 | 1 | 0 | 0 | – | – |
Players who have made an appearance this season, but have since left the club:
| 10 | FW | (Ivory Coast) Wilfried Bony | 16 | 4 | 9 | – | – | – | 0 | 2 | 0 | 16 | 6 | 9 | 2 | 1 |
