= James Demetriou =

Cypriot association football player

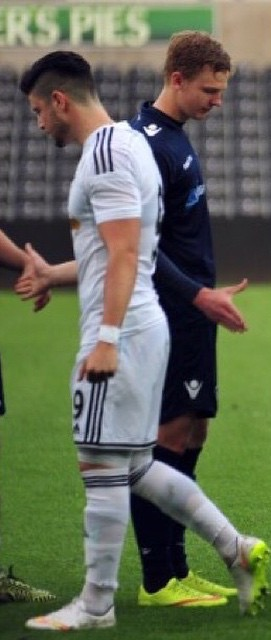

Personal information
- Full name: James Andreas Demetriou
- Date of birth: 14 August 1995 (age 31)
- Place of birth: Sydney, Australia
- Height: 1.82 m (5 ft 11 1/2 in)
- Position: Striker

Team information
- Current team: Mt Druitt Town Rangers

Youth career
- 2010–2012: Sydney Olympic

Senior career*
Years	Team	Apps	(Gls)
2013	Sydney Olympic	12	(8)
2013–2014	Nottingham Forest	0	(0)
2014–2016	Swansea City	0	(0)
2016	→ Wealdstone (loan)	3	(1)
2016–2017	Karmiotissa	0	(0)
2017–2018	Bangor City	11	(4)
2018	Barry Town United	8	(4)
2018	Sydney Olympic	8	(0)
2019	Blacktown City	13	(6)
2020	Heidelberg United	0	(0)
2021	Hakoah Sydney City East	14	(3)
2023–	Mt Druitt Town Rangers	8	(1)

International career^{‡}
2014	Cyprus U21	5	(2)
- * Club domestic league appearances and goals as of 10 November 2021 ‡ National team caps and goals as of 20:05, 11 September 2015 (UTC)

James Andreas Demetriou (born 14 August 1995) is a professional footballer who plays as a forward for Mt Druitt Town Rangers. Born in Australia, he has represented Cyprus at youth level.

== Club career ==
=== Nottingham Forest ===
On 14 August 2013, Demetriou was given a two-year professional contract at the City Ground.

Later that season, he would receive his first international cap for Cyprus U21 in the U21 European Qualifiers.

After continuing with a run of goals in the U21 league, Demetriou was offered an extension on his contract amidst other English clubs wanting his signature.

=== Swansea City ===
On 28 June 2014, Demetriou joined Swansea City FC on another two-year professional contract. There, he was charged with multiple purported betting offences and was fined £700 by the Football Association.

In 2015, Demetriou helped the reserves to the U21 Premier League Title.

On 14 March 2016 Demetriou joined Conference South side Wealdstone FC on an end-of-season loan to aid the side to safety.

=== Karmiotissa ===
In September 2016, Demetriou completed a transfer to Cypriot First Division side Karmiotissa. He appeared on the bench three times for the club before making his debut in the Cypriot Cup against AEK Larnaca on 18 January 2017; he played forty-four minutes in a 1–6 defeat.

=== Welsh Premier League ===
On 6 October 2017, Demetriou joined Welsh Premier League side Bangor City. He made his debut the following day as a substitute, scoring the only goal of the game in a 1–0 victory over Bala Town.

On 30 January 2018, Demetriou joined fellow Welsh Premier League side Barry Town United and scored a hat-trick vs Llandudno after coming on for an injured teammate in the first half.

=== Return to Australia ===
In June 2018 he returned to Sydney Olympic. After leaving Sydney Olympic, and having spells with Heidelberg United and Hakoah Sydney City East, he was announced by Mt Druitt Town Rangers to play for the 2023 season.

== Personal life ==
Demetriou is eligible to play for Cyprus, with both of his grandparents having been born there.

== Career statistics ==
As of 31 March 2017.

Club statistics
Club	Season	League			Cup (Note: Includes the FA Cup and Cypriot Cup)		League Cup (Note: Includes the EFL Cup)		Continental		Other		Total	
Club	Season	Division	Apps	Goals	Apps	Goals	Apps	Goals	Apps	Goals	Apps	Goals	Apps	Goals
Sydney Olympic	2013	Football NSW	12	8	—		—		—		0	0	12	8
Sydney Olympic	Total		12	8	—		—		—		0	0	12	8
Nottingham Forest	2013–14	EFL Championship	0	0	0	0	0	0	—		0	0	0	0
Nottingham Forest	Total		0	0	0	0	0	0	—		0	0	0	0
Swansea City	2014–15	Premier League	0	0	0	0	0	0	—		0	0	0	0
Swansea City	2015–16	Premier League	0	0	0	0	0	0	—		0	0	0	0
Swansea City	2016–17	Premier League	0	0	0	0	0	0	—		0	0	0	0
Swansea City	Total		0	0	0	0	0	0	—		0	0	0	0
Wealdstone (loan)	2015–16	National League South	3	1	0	0	—		—		0	0	10	1
Karmiotissa	2016–17	Cypriot First Division	0	0	1	0	—		—		0	0	1	0
Karmiotissa	Total		0	0	1	0	—		—		0	0	1	0
Career total			22	9	1	0	—		—		0	0	23	9
