= Jefferson Montero =

Ecuadorian footballer (born 1989)

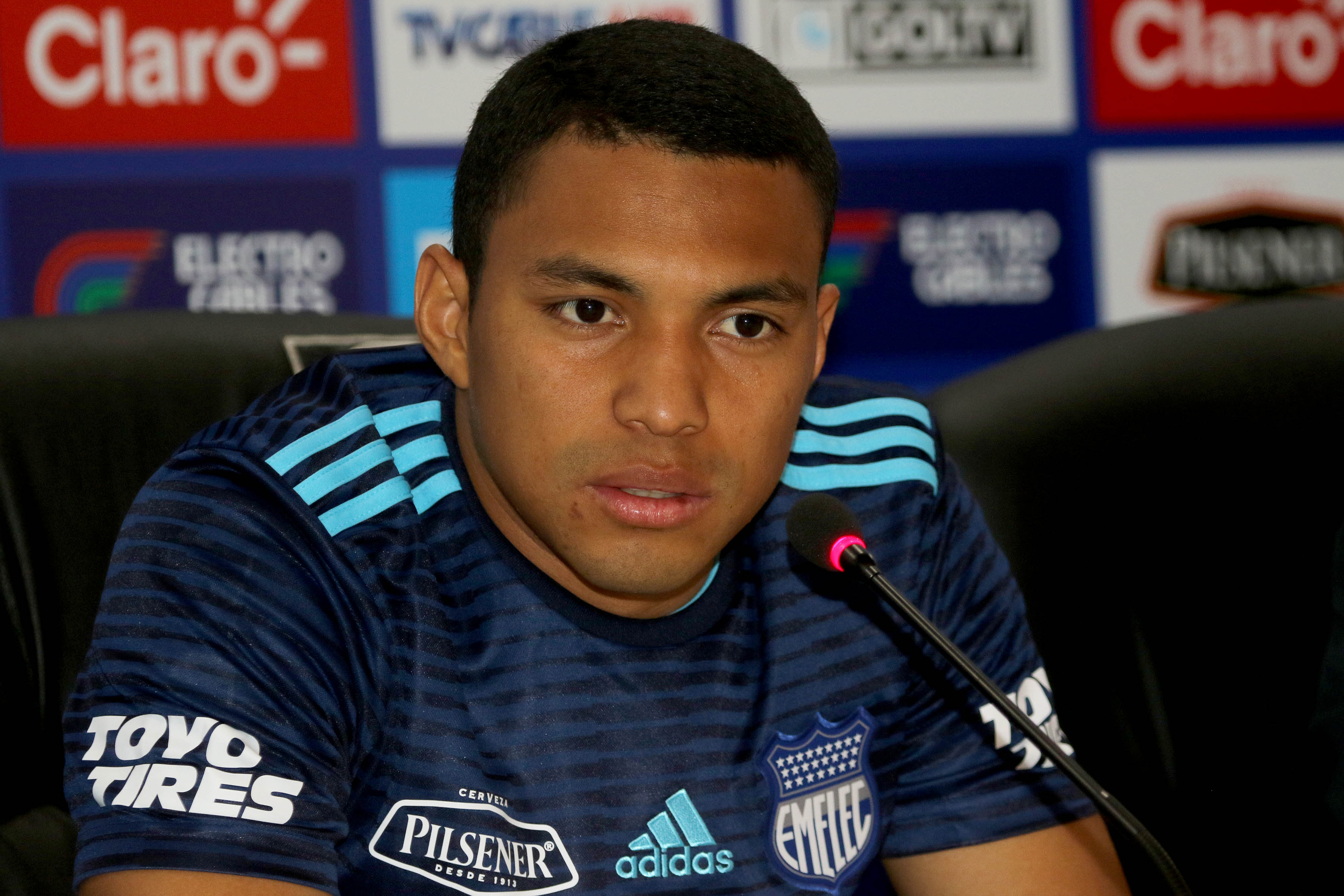
- Montero with Emelec in 2018

Personal information
- Full name: Jefferson Antonio Montero Vite
- Date of birth: 1 September 1989 (age 37)
- Place of birth: Babahoyo, Ecuador
- Height: 1.73 m (5 ft 8 in)
- Position: Winger

Youth career
- Emelec

Senior career*
Years	Team	Apps	(Gls)
2007	Emelec	22	(2)
2008–2009	Independiente José Teran	37	(19)
2008	→ Dorados (loan)	5	(1)
2009–2010	Villarreal B	32	(10)
2010–2012	Villarreal	9	(1)
2011	→ Levante (loan)	11	(0)
2011–2012	→ Betis (loan)	32	(1)
2012–2014	Morelia	57	(9)
2014–2020	Swansea City	78	(1)
2017–2018	→ Getafe (loan)	4	(0)
2018	→ Emelec (loan)	12	(1)
2019	→ West Bromwich Albion (loan)	4	(1)
2019–2020	→ Birmingham City (loan)	14	(0)
2021–2022	Querétaro	30	(0)
2022	9 de Octubre	7	(0)
2023	Aucas	13	(0)
2024	Academia AV	1	(0)
2025	St Helens	4	(0)

International career
2007–2018	Ecuador	64	(10)
- * Club domestic league appearances and goals as of 18:16, 1 February 2025 (UTC)

Jefferson Antonio Montero Vite (Spanish pronunciation: [ˈɟʝefeɾsom monˈteɾo]; born 1 September 1989) is an Ecuadorian former professional footballer who played as a winger. He has represented the Ecuador national team at senior international level.

== Club career ==
=== Early years ===
Born in Babahoyo, Los Ríos Province, Montero started playing professionally with Emelec, but first impressed while at Independiente José Teran in the Ecuadorian Serie B.

Shortly after arriving he was loaned to Mexican club Dorados de Sinaloa, which was pushing for promotion to the Liga MX. He signed alongside compatriot José Madrid, and made his official debut for his new team on 11 October 2008 by playing the entire match against Irapuato.

=== Villarreal ===
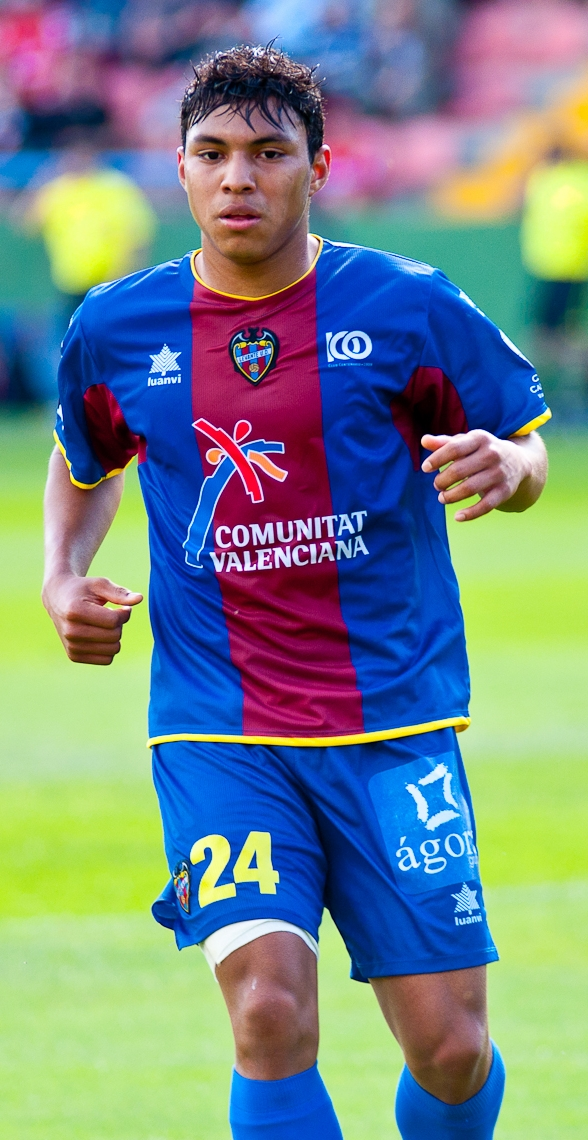
Montero playing for Levante in 2011

On 27 April 2009, La Liga club Villarreal signed the 20-year-old Montero to a five-year contract effective from July. He contributed two goals and five assists as the Valencians trounced amateurs Navata 27–0 in a pre-season friendly. He made his competitive debut for the senior side in the Europa League round of 32 in February 2010, replacing Robert Pires with 20 minutes left as Villarreal were eliminated by Wolfsburg, but spent the vast majority of his first season with the reserves as one of their most important attacking elements as they overachieved to finish seventh in their first season in the Segunda División.

Subsequently, Montero was promoted to the main squad as a complement for the more experienced Santi Cazorla and Cani. He made his top-flight debut in the opening fixture of the 2010–11 La Liga season, replacing Cani in a 0–1 loss at Real Sociedad.

Montero failed to find a regular first-team place at Villarreal, and moved to another La Liga club, Levante, in late January 2011 on loan for the rest of the season. He spent the following season on loan at another top-flight club, the newly promoted Real Betis. He scored his first goal of the campaign on 10 March 2012 in a 2–3 home defeat against Real Madrid. He was first choice throughout most of his tenure with the Pepe Mel-led squad, who managed to retain their league status.

=== Morelia ===
On 15 June 2012, Montero was transferred to Monarcas Morelia of the Mexican top flight, on a three-year deal. He scored his first goal on 15 July against Club América, as well as making two assists. On 21 August, in the Copa MX contest against his former team Dorados, he scored a hat-trick in a 6–0 win.

On 4 January 2013, Montero scored the opening goal of the Clausura, in a 3–3 home draw against Cruz Azul, assisted by international team-mate Joao Rojas. After Rojas left Morelia, Montero was given the number 10 shirt, starting off the new campaign on 19 July with a goal and two assists in a 3–1 victory over Querétaro. His hat-trick the following weekend was in vain, as Morelia lost 4–3 at home to Toluca. He scored the opening goal in the Apertura 2013 Copa MX Final in which Morelia beat Atlas on penalties after the match finished as a 3–3 draw.

=== Swansea City ===
On 24 July 2014, Montero signed for Premier League team Swansea City on a four-year contract for an undisclosed fee. He made his competitive debut on 16 August in the opening game of the season at Old Trafford, replacing Nathan Dyer after 67 minutes of a 2–1 win over Manchester United.

Montero joined Spanish top-division club Getafe on 1 September 2017 on loan for the season. In his first match of the 2017–18 La Liga campaign 20 days later, he played for 15 minutes in a 1–1 away draw with Celta. Having featured little for Getafe, Montero rejoined Emelec in late February 2018 where he completed his loan. On 2 June, he scored in the 3–0 victory against Técnico Universitario at Estadio George Capwell, 11 years after his last goal for the club. In his post-match interview he said he was "very happy for today's victory and for scoring for my team after so many years, forever grateful to God".

Montero made 13 substitute appearances for Swansea before joining 2018–19 Championship rivals West Bromwich Albion on 31 January 2019 on loan for the rest of the season. He played just four times and started once, away to Queens Park Rangers on 19 February, opening the scoring in a 3–2 win.

After a delay while issues with the paperwork were resolved, Montero was confirmed to have joined Championship club Birmingham City on loan for the 2019–20 season. He made his debut on 20 August as a late substitute in the 2–0 win over Barnsley, and produced a "sparkling ten minute cameo" that earned him 7 out of 10 in the Birmingham Mail's player ratings. He started the next match, but suffered a thigh injury that kept him out for a couple of months. By the time the season was suspended because of the COVID-19 pandemic, he had made 18 appearances in all competitions but only 2 league starts, and Birmingham chose not to attempt to extend his loan to the end of the campaign. He was released by Swansea when his contract expired on 30 June.

=== Later career ===
On 20 November 2020, Montero returned to Mexico to join Liga MX side Querétaro.

On 17 January 2025, Montero returned to England, joining North West Counties Premier Division club FC St Helens.

== International career ==
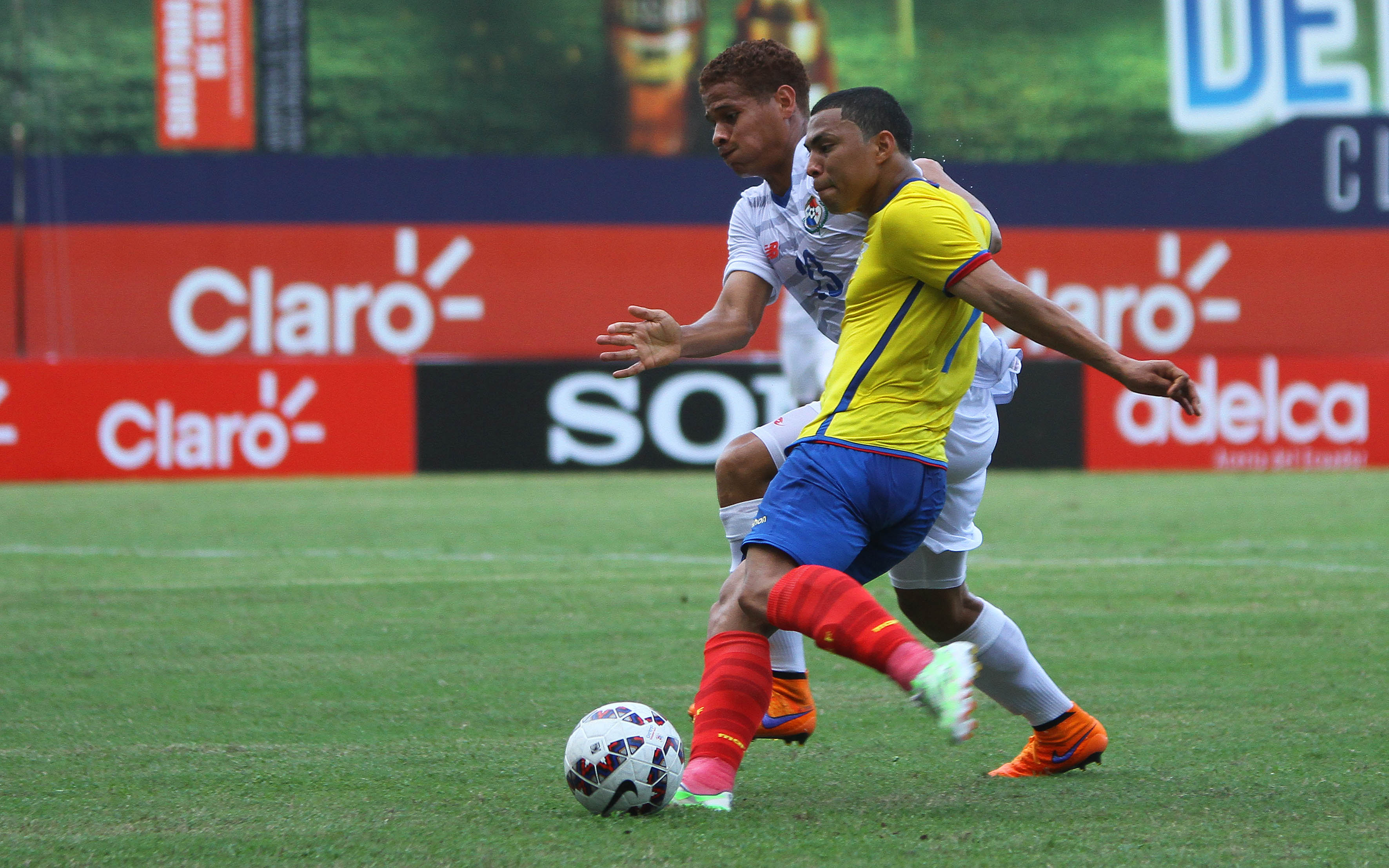
Montero in action for Ecuador in 2015

Montero represented Ecuador at the 2007 Pan American Games, and scored in the final match against Jamaica, a 2–1 win which brought the first international trophy in Ecuadorian football history. He received his first senior call-up from coach Luis Fernando Suárez for an August 2007 friendly with Bolivia.

Montero made his senior debut for Ecuador on 21 November 2007 in a 2010 FIFA World Cup qualifier at home to Peru, coming on late in the second half in a 5–1 win. He scored his first goal for the national team on 27 May 2009, in a 1–3 friendly loss to El Salvador, and his second came in the reverse fixture with Peru in Lima, which Ecuador won 2–1.

Montero was selected by national coach Reinaldo Rueda for his 2014 World Cup squad. He made his debut in the tournament on 15 June in a 1–2 group stage loss against Switzerland; he started and played 77 minutes.

== Career statistics ==
=== Club ===
As of end of 2019–20 season

Appearances and goals by club, season and competition
Club	Season	League			National cup (Note: Includes Copa del Rey, Copa MX, FA Cup)		League cup (Note: Includes Football League Cup)		Continental		Total	
Club	Season	Division	Apps	Goals	Apps	Goals	Apps	Goals	Apps	Goals	Apps	Goals
Emelec	2007	Serie A	22	2	—		—		0	0	22	2
Independiente José Teran	2008	Serie B	25	8	—		—		—		25	8
Independiente José Teran	2009	Serie B	12	11	—		—		—		12	11
Independiente José Teran	Total		37	19	—		—		—		37	19
Dorados (loan)	2008–09	Primera División A	5	1	0	0	—		—		5	1
Villarreal B	2009–10	Segunda División	32	10	0	0	—		—		32	10
Villarreal	2009–10	La Liga	0	0	0	0	—		1 (Note: Appearances in UEFA Europa League)	0	1	0
Villarreal	2010–11	La Liga	9	1	3	1	—		7	0	19	2
Villarreal	Total		9	1	3	1	—		8	0	20	2
Levante (loan)	2010–11	La Liga	11	0	0	0	—		—		11	0
Betis (loan)	2011–12	La Liga	32	1	2	0	—		0	0	34	1
Morelia	2012–13	Liga MX	32	4	7	4	—		4 (Note: Appearances in Liguilla)	0	43	8
Morelia	2013–14	Liga MX	25	5	3	1	—		3 (Note: One appearance in Copa Libertadores, two appearances and one goal in Liguilla)	1	31	7
Morelia	Total		57	9	10	5	—		7	1	74	15
Swansea City	2014–15	Premier League	30	1	1	0	3	0	—		34	1
Swansea City	2015–16	Premier League	23	0	1	1	0	0	—		24	1
Swansea City	2016–17	Premier League	13	0	0	0	1	0	—		14	0
Swansea City	2017–18	Premier League	0	0	—		0	0	—		0	0
Swansea City	2018–19	Championship	12	0	0	0	0	0	—		12	0
Swansea City	2019–20	Championship	—		—		—		—		—	
Swansea City	Total		78	1	2	1	4	0	—		84	2
Getafe (loan)	2017–18	La Liga	4	0	0	0	—		—		4	0
Emelec (loan)	2018	Serie A	12	1	—		—		2 (Note: Appearances in Copa Libertadores)	0	14	1
West Bromwich Albion (loan)	2018–19	Championship	4	1	0	0	—		—		4	1
Birmingham City (loan)	2019–20	Championship	14	0	4	0	—		—		18	0
Career total			321	49	21	7	4	0	17	1	363	57

=== International ===
As of match played 15 November 2018

Appearances and goals by year
Ecuador
Year	Apps	Goals
2007	1	0
2008	2	0
2009	8	2
2010	2	0
2011	4	0
2012	7	1
2013	12	4
2014	7	1
2015	10	2
2016	9	0
2017	1	0
2018	1	0
Total	64	10

International goals

Scores and results list Ecuador's goal tally first.
As of 15 August 2019

No.	Date	Venue	Opponent	Score	Result	Competition
1	27 May 2009	Los Angeles Memorial Coliseum, Los Angeles, United States	El Salvador	1–0	1–3	Friendly
2	7 June 2009	Monumental "U", Lima, Peru	Peru	1–0	2–1	2010 World Cup qualification
3	15 August 2012	Citi Field, New York City, United States	Chile	3–0	3–0	Friendly
4	21 March 2013	Olímpico Atahualpa, Quito, Ecuador	El Salvador	4–0	5–0	Friendly
5	26 March 2013	Olímpico Atahualpa, Quito, Ecuador	Paraguay	2–1	4–1	2014 World Cup qualification
6	26 March 2013	Olímpico Atahualpa, Quito, Ecuador	Paraguay	4–1	4–1	2014 World Cup qualification
7	11 October 2013	Olímpico Atahualpa, Quito, Ecuador	Uruguay	1–0	1–0	2014 World Cup qualification
8	17 May 2014	Amsterdam Arena, Amsterdam, Netherlands	Netherlands	1–0	1–1	Friendly
9	6 June 2015	Reales Tamarindos, Portoviejo, Ecuador	Panama	4–0	4–0	Friendly
10	17 November 2015	Polideportivo Cachamay, Ciudad Guayana, Venezuela	Venezuela	2–0	3–1	2018 World Cup qualification

== Honours ==
Morelia

- Copa MX: Apertura 2013

Ecuador U20

- Pan American Games: 2007
