= 2016–17 Swansea City A.F.C. season =

Swansea City
2016–17 season
- Chairman: Huw Jenkins
- Head Coach: Francesco Guidolin (until 3 October); Bob Bradley (3 October – 27 December); Paul Clement (from 3 January)
- Stadium: Liberty Stadium
- Premier League: 15th
- FA Cup: Third round (eliminated by Hull City)
- EFL Cup: Third round (eliminated by Manchester City)
- Top goalscorer: League: Fernando Llorente (15); All: Fernando Llorente (15)
- Highest home attendance: 20,938 vs. Manchester United (6 November 2016, Premier League)
- Lowest home attendance: 20,024 vs. Hull (20 August 2016, Premier League)
- Average home league attendance: 20,619
| Home colours | Away colours |

The 2016–17 season was Swansea City's 97th season in the English football league system, and their sixth consecutive season in the Premier League. Along with competing in the Premier League, the club competed in the FA Cup and EFL Cup. The season covers the period from 1 July 2016 to 30 June 2017.

== Squad information ==
=== First team squad ===
| N | Pos. | Nat. | Name | Age | EU | Since | App | Goals | Ends | Transfer fee | Notes |
|---|---|---|---|---|---|---|---|---|---|---|---|
| 1 | GK | (Poland) | Łukasz Fabiański | 32 | EU | 2014 | 113 | 0 | 2019 | Free | |
| 2 | CB | (Spain) | Jordi Amat | 26 | EU | 2013 | 72 | 0 | 2019 | £2,500,000 | |
| 3 | FW | (Ghana) | Jordan Ayew | 25 | Non-EU | 2017 (Winter) | 14 | 1 | 2020 | £5,000,000 | |
| 4 | DM | (South Korea) | Ki Sung-yueng | 28 | Non-EU | 2012 | 130 | 10 | 2018 | £5,500,000 | |
| 5 | CB | (Netherlands) | Mike van der Hoorn | 24 | EU | 2016 | 11 | 1 | 2019 | Undisclosed | |
| 6 | CB | (England) | Alfie Mawson | 23 | EU | 2016 | 27 | 4 | 2020 | Undisclosed | |
| 7 | CM | (England) | Leon Britton | 34 | EU | 2002-2010, 2011 | 521 | 17 | 2017 | Undisclosed | |
| 8 | CM | (Netherlands) | Leroy Fer | 27 | EU | 2016 | 48 | 6 | 2019 | Undisclosed | |
| 9 | FW | (Spain) | Fernando Llorente | 32 | EU | 2016 | 35 | 15 | 2018 | Undisclosed | |
| 10 | FW | (Spain) | Borja Bastón | 24 | EU | 2016 | 20 | 1 | 2020 | £15,500,000 | |
| 12 | RW | (England) | Nathan Dyer | 29 | EU | 2009 | 281 | 31 | 2020 | £400,000 | |
| 13 | GK | (Sweden) | Kristoffer Nordfeldt | 27 | EU | 2015 | 8 | 0 | 2018 | £600,000 | |
| 15 | LW | (England) | Wayne Routledge | 32 | EU | 2011 | 212 | 21 | 2018 | Undisclosed | |
| 16 | LB | (Sweden) | Martin Olsson | 29 | EU | 2017 (Winter) | 15 | 2 | 2019 | Undisclosed | |
| 17 | RW | (The Gambia) (Sweden) | Modou Barrow | 24 | EU | 2014 | 55 | 2 | 2019 | Undisclosed | |
| 19 | GK | (Australia) | Mark Birighitti | 26 | Non-EU | 2016 | 0 | 0 | 2018 | Free | |
| 20 | LW | (Ecuador) | Jefferson Montero | 27 | Non-EU | 2014 | 72 | 2 | 2018 | Undisclosed | |
| 22 | RB | (Spain) | Àngel Rangel | 34 | EU | 2007 | 367 | 10 | 2018 | Undisclosed | |
| 23 | AM | (Iceland) | Gylfi Sigurðsson | 27 | Non-EU | 2012, 2014 | 131 | 37 | 2020 | Undisclosed | |
| 24 | DM | (England) | Jack Cork | 27 | EU | 2015 (Winter) | 83 | 2 | 2018 | Undisclosed | |
| 25 | GK | (Germany) | Gerhard Tremmel | 38 | EU | 2011 | 52 | 0 | 2017 | Free | |
| 26 | RB | (England) | Kyle Naughton | 28 | EU | 2015 (Winter) | 71 | 1 | 2018 | Undisclosed | |
| 28 | RW | (Netherlands) | Luciano Narsingh | 26 | EU | 2017 (Winter) | 13 | 0 | 2019 | £4,000,000 | |
| 33 | CB | (Argentina) (Italy) | Federico Fernández | 28 | EU | 2014 | 93 | 1 | 2018 | Undisclosed | |
| 35 | LB | (Scotland) | Stephen Kingsley | 22 | EU | 2014 | 19 | 0 | 2020 | Undisclosed | |
| 42 | CM | (England) | Tom Carroll | 24 | EU | 2014, 2017 (Winter) | 17 | 1 | 2020 | Undisclosed | |
| 56 | CM | (Scotland) | Jay Fulton | 23 | EU | 2014 (Winter) | 22 | 1 | 2020 | Undisclosed | |
| 62 | FW | (Scotland) | Oli McBurnie | 20 | EU | 2015 | 6 | 2 | 2018 | Undisclosed | |

Updated to match played 21 May 2017
Source: Swansea City A.F.C.
Ordered by 2016–17 squad numbers.

== Transfers ==
=== Transfers in ===
| Date | Position | Nationality | Name | From | Contract length | Fee | Ref. |
|---|---|---|---|---|---|---|---|
| 31 May 2016 | MF | NED | Tom Plezier | Brabant United F.C. | 2 years | Undisclosed | |
| 5 July 2016 | MF | NED | Leroy Fer | Queens Park Rangers | 3 years | Undisclosed | |
| 6 July 2016 | DF | NED | Mike van der Hoorn | Ajax | 3 years | £2,000,000 | |
| 11 July 2016 | MF | SCO | George Byers | Free agent | 2 years | Free transfer | |
| 12 July 2016 | DF | ENG | Tyler Reid | Manchester United | 3 years | Undisclosed | |
| 18 July 2016 | GK | AUS | Mark Birighitti | Free agent | 2 years | Free transfer | |
| 5 August 2016 | FW | ESP | Fernando Llorente | Sevilla | 2 years | £5,000,000 | |
| 11 August 2016 | FW | ESP | Borja Bastón | Atlético Madrid | 4 years | £15,500,000 | |
| 30 August 2016 | DF | ENG | Alfie Mawson | Barnsley | 4 years | £5,000,000 | |
| 12 January 2017 | MF | NED | Luciano Narsingh | PSV Eindhoven | 2½ years | £4,000,000 | |
| 17 January 2017 | MF | ENG | Tom Carroll | Tottenham Hotspur | 3½ years | Undisclosed | |
| 17 January 2017 | DF | SWE | Martin Olsson | Norwich City | 2½ years | Undisclosed | |
| 31 January 2017 | FW | GHA | Jordan Ayew | Aston Villa | 3½ years | £5,000,000 + Neil Taylor | |

=== Loans out ===
| Date from | Position | Nationality | Name | To | Expiry date | Ref. |
|---|---|---|---|---|---|---|
| 1 July 2016 | DF | ENG | Kyle Bartley | Leeds United | End of season | |
| 1 July 2016 | GK | WAL | Oliver Davies | Kilmarnock | 1 September 2016 (Note: On 1 September 2016, Kilmarnock released Oliver Davies cutting his loan deal short.) | |
| 1 July 2016 | DF | WAL | Liam Shephard | Yeovil Town | 2 January 2017 | |
| 7 July 2016 | MF | ENG | Matt Grimes | Leeds United | End of season | |
| 8 July 2016 | MF | WAL | Ryan Hedges | Yeovil Town | 2 January 2017 | |
| 28 July 2016 | GK | ENG | Josh Vickers | Barnet | End of season | |
| 29 July 2016 | FW | FRA | Bafétimbi Gomis | Marseille | End of season | |
| 29 July 2016 | MF | NED | Kenji Gorré | Northampton Town | 3 January 2017 | |
| 5 August 2016 | MF | SCO | Adam King | Southend United | End of season | |
| 8 August 2016 | MF | WAL | Josh Sheehan | Newport County | 21 January 2017 | |
| 25 August 2016 | DF | WAL | Connor Roberts | Bristol Rovers | 2 January 2017 | |
| 31 August 2016 | DF | FRA | Franck Tabanou | Granada | End of season | |
| 31 August 2016 | FW | NED | Marvin Emnes | Blackburn Rovers | 15 January 2017 | |
| 14 January 2017 | FW | WAL | Alex Samuel | Newport County | End of season | |
| 27 January 2017 | MF | WAL | Alex Bray | Rotherham United | End of season | |
| 31 January 2017 | MF | GAM | Modou Barrow | Leeds United | End of season | |
| 31 January 2017 | FW | NED | Marvin Emnes | Blackburn Rovers | End of season | |
| 31 January 2017 | MF | IRL | Tom Holland | AFC Fylde | End of season | |
| 31 January 2017 | MF | WAL | Owain Jones | Yeovil Town | End of season | |

=== Transfers out ===
| Date | Position | Nationality | Name | To | Fee | Ref. |
|---|---|---|---|---|---|---|
| 20 May 2016 | MF | WAL | Lee Lucas | Motherwell | Released | |
| 20 May 2016 | MF | WAL | Henry Jones | Bangor City | Released | |
| 20 May 2016 | MF | WAL | Daniel Alfei | Free agent | Released | |
| 20 May 2016 | MF | WAL | Kyle Copp | Yeovil Town | Released | |
| 20 May 2016 | MF | CYP | Alex Gogić | Free agent | Released | |
| 20 May 2016 | DF | ENG | Raheem Hanley | Northampton Town | Released | |
| 20 May 2016 | FW | CYP | James Demetriou | Karmiotissa | Released | |
| 20 May 2016 | GK | WAL | Gareth Owen | Free agent | Released | |
| 24 May 2016 | FW | POR | Éder | Lille OSC | £4,000,000 | |
| 17 June 2016 | FW | ITA | Alberto Paloschi | Atalanta | £5,000,000 | |
| 8 August 2016 | FW | GHA | André Ayew | West Ham United | £20,500,000 | |
| 10 August 2016 | DF | WAL | Ashley Williams | Everton | £12,000,000 | |
| 2 September 2016 | GK | WAL | Oliver Davies | Free agent | Released | |
| 31 January 2017 | DF | WAL | Neil Taylor | Aston Villa | Jordan Ayew swap deal | |
| 31 January 2017 | MF | WAL | Ryan Hedges | Barnsley | Undisclosed | |
| 9 May 2017 | FW | WAL | Alex Samuel | Stevenage | Free | |

=== New contracts ===
| Date signed | Position | Nationality | Name | Contract length | Expiry date | Ref. |
|---|---|---|---|---|---|---|
| 20 May 2016 | DF | WAL | Aaron Lewis | 1 year | June 2017 | |
| 20 May 2016 | MF | WAL | Jack Evans | 1 year | June 2017 | |
| 20 May 2016 | MF | WAL | Tom Dyson | 1 year | June 2017 | |
| 20 May 2016 | GK | SVN | Gregor Zabret | 2 years | June 2018 | |
| 1 July 2016 | DF | ENG | Kyle Bartley | 1 year | June 2018 | |
| 7 July 2016 | FW | GAM | Modou Barrow | 3 years | June 2019 | |
| 8 July 2016 | MF | SCO | Adam King | 3 years | June 2019 | |
| 10 July 2016 | MF | SCO | Jay Fulton | 4 years | June 2020 | |
| 11 July 2016 | DF | SCO | Stephen Kingsley | 4 years | June 2020 | |
| 2 August 2016 | MF | ISL | Gylfi Sigurðsson | 4 years | June 2020 | |
| 2 August 2016 | MF | ENG | Nathan Dyer | 4 years | June 2020 | |
| 8 August 2016 | DF | ESP | Àngel Rangel | 1 year | June 2018 | |
| 27 September 2016 | DF | WAL | Connor Roberts | 3 years | June 2019 | |

== Pre-season friendlies ==
Win Draw Loss Postponed

| 13 July 2016 Friendly | Charlotte Independence | 0–4 | Swansea City | Charlotte |
| 19:30 EDT (UTC-04:00) | | Report | McBurnie 27'; Routledge 52', 73'; Gorré 81' | Stadium: Ramblewood Soccer Complex |

| 16 July 2016 Friendly | Richmond Kickers | 2–0 | Swansea City | Richmond |
| 19:00 EDT (UTC-04:00) | Amat 11' (o.g.); Grant 74' | Report | | Stadium: City Stadium |

| 23 July 2016 Friendly | Bristol Rovers | 1–5 | Swansea City | Bristol |
| 15:00 BST (UTC+01:00) | James 50' | Report | Ayew 6'; Fer 13'; Kingsley 18'; Naughton 45'; Routledge 68' | Stadium: Memorial Stadium; Attendance: 4,365 |

| 27 July 2016 Friendly | Swindon Town | 0–3 | Swansea City | Swindon |
| 19:45 BST (UTC+01:00) | | Report | Ayew 50'; Fulton 54'; Barrow 71' | Stadium: County Ground; Attendance: 3,306 |

| 30 July 2016 Friendly | Wolverhampton Wanderers | 0–4 | Swansea City | Wolverhampton |
| 15:00 BST (UTC+01:00) | | Report | Routledge 12', 62'; Naughton 59'; McBurnie 84' | Stadium: Molineux Stadium; Attendance: 7,968 |

| 6 August 2016 Friendly | Swansea City | 1–0 | Stade Rennais | Swansea |
| 15:00 BST (UTC+01:00) | Fulton 70' | Report | | Stadium: Liberty Stadium |

== Competitions ==
=== Overall ===
| Competition | Started round | Current position / round | Final position / round | First match | Last match |
|---|---|---|---|---|---|
| Premier League | — | — | 15th | 13 August 2016 | 21 May 2017 |
| FA Cup | Third round | — | Third round | 7 January 2017 | 7 January 2017 |
| League Cup | Second round | — | Third round | 23 August 2016 | 21 September 2016 |

Updated to match played 21 May 2017
Source: Competitions

=== Overview ===
| Competition | Record | | | | | | | |
| Competition | G | W | D | L | GF | GA | GD | Win % |
|---|---|---|---|---|---|---|---|---|
| Premier League | 38 | 12 | 5 | 21 | 45 | 70 | −25 | 31.58 |
| FA Cup | 1 | 0 | 0 | 1 | 0 | 2 | −2 | 0.00 |
| EFL Cup | 2 | 1 | 0 | 1 | 4 | 3 | +1 | 50.00 |
| Total | 41 | 13 | 5 | 23 | 49 | 75 | −26 | 31.71 |

Updated to match played 21 May 2017
Source: Competitions

=== Premier League ===
==== League table ====
| Pos | Team | Pld | W | D | L | GF | GA | GD | Pts |
|---|---|---|---|---|---|---|---|---|---|
| 13 | Stoke City | 38 | 11 | 11 | 16 | 41 | 56 | −15 | 44 |
| 14 | Crystal Palace | 38 | 12 | 5 | 21 | 50 | 63 | −13 | 41 |
| 15 | Swansea City | 38 | 12 | 5 | 21 | 45 | 70 | −25 | 41 |
| 16 | Burnley | 38 | 11 | 7 | 20 | 39 | 55 | −16 | 40 |
| 17 | Watford | 38 | 11 | 7 | 20 | 40 | 68 | −28 | 40 |

Source: Premier League
Rules for classification: 1) Points; 2) Goal difference; 3) Goals scored; 4) Play-offs (only if needed to decide champion, teams for relegation or teams for UEFA competitions).

==== Results summary ====
| Overall | | | | | | | | Home | | | | | | Away | | | | | |
| Pld | W | D | L | GF | GA | GD | Pts | W | D | L | GF | GA | GD | W | D | L | GF | GA | GD |
|---|---|---|---|---|---|---|---|---|---|---|---|---|---|---|---|---|---|---|---|
| 38 | 12 | 5 | 21 | 45 | 70 | −25 | 41 | 8 | 3 | 8 | 27 | 34 | −7 | 4 | 2 | 13 | 18 | 36 | −18 |

Last updated: 21 May 2017.
Source: BBC

==== Results by matchday ====
| Matchday | 1 | 2 | 3 | 4 | 5 | 6 | 7 | 8 | 9 | 10 | 11 | 12 | 13 | 14 | 15 | 16 | 17 | 18 | 19 | 20 | 21 | 22 | 23 | 24 | 25 | 26 | 27 | 28 | 29 | 30 | 31 | 32 | 33 | 34 | 35 | 36 | 37 | 38 |
|---|---|---|---|---|---|---|---|---|---|---|---|---|---|---|---|---|---|---|---|---|---|---|---|---|---|---|---|---|---|---|---|---|---|---|---|---|---|---|
| Ground | A | H | A | H | A | H | H | A | H | A | H | A | H | A | H | A | A | H | H | A | H | A | H | A | H | A | H | A | A | H | H | A | A | H | A | H | A | H |
| Result | W | L | L | D | L | L | L | L | D | L | L | D | W | L | W | L | L | L | L | W | L | W | W | L | W | L | W | L | L | D | L | L | L | W | D | W | W | W |
| Position | 6 | 10 | 14 | 13 | 15 | 16 | 17 | 18 | 18 | 18 | 19 | 20 | 19 | 20 | 17 | 18 | 19 | 19 | 20 | 19 | 20 | 17 | 17 | 17 | 15 | 15 | 16 | 17 | 17 | 17 | 18 | 18 | 18 | 18 | 18 | 17 | 17 | 15 |

Updated to match(es) played on 21 May 2017. Source: BBC
A = Away; H = Home; W = Win; D = Draw; L = Loss

==== Matches ====
Win Draw Loss

| 13 August 2016 1 | Burnley | 0–1 | Swansea City | Burnley |
| 15:00 BST (UTC+01:00) | | Report | Fer 82' | Stadium: Turf Moor; Attendance: 19,126; Referee: Jonathan Moss |

| 20 August 2016 2 | Swansea City | 0–2 | Hull City | Swansea |
| 15:00 BST (UTC+01:00) | | Report | Maloney 79'; Hernández 90+2' | Stadium: Liberty Stadium; Attendance: 20,024; Referee: Stuart Attwell |

| 27 August 2016 3 | Leicester City | 2–1 | Swansea City | Leicester |
| 15:00 BST (UTC+01:00) | Vardy 32'; Morgan 52' | Report | Fer 81' | Stadium: King Power Stadium; Attendance: 31,727; Referee: Roger East |

| 11 September 2016 4 | Swansea City | 2–2 | Chelsea | Swansea |
| 16:00 BST (UTC+01:00) | Sigurðsson 59' (pen.); Fer 62' | Report | Costa 18', 81' | Stadium: Liberty Stadium; Attendance: 20,865; Referee: Andre Marriner |

| 18 September 2016 5 | Southampton | 1–0 | Swansea City | Southampton |
| 14:15 BST (UTC+01:00) | Austin 64' | Report | | Stadium: St Mary's Stadium; Attendance: 29,087; Referee: Mike Jones |

| 24 September 2016 6 | Swansea City | 1–3 | Manchester City | Swansea |
| 15:00 BST (UTC+01:00) | Llorente 13' | Report | Agüero 9', 65' (pen.); Sterling 77' | Stadium: Liberty Stadium; Attendance: 20,786; Referee: Neil Swarbrick |

| 1 October 2016 7 | Swansea City | 1–2 | Liverpool | Swansea |
| 12:30 BST (UTC+01:00) | Fer 8' | Report | Firmino 54'; Milner 84' (pen.) | Stadium: Liberty Stadium; Attendance: 20,862; Referee: Michael Oliver |

| 15 October 2016 8 | Arsenal | 3–2 | Swansea City | Holloway, London |
| 15:00 BST (UTC+01:00) | Walcott 26', 33'; Özil 57'; Xhaka (red card) 70' | Report | Sigurðsson 38'; Borja 66' | Stadium: Emirates Stadium; Attendance: 60,007; Referee: Jon Moss |

| 22 October 2016 9 | Swansea City | 0–0 | Watford | Swansea |
| 15:00 BST (UTC+01:00) | | Report | | Stadium: Liberty Stadium; Attendance: 20,694; Referee: Paul Tierney |

| 31 October 2016 10 | Stoke City | 3–1 | Swansea City | Stoke-on-Trent |
| 20:00 GMT (UTC+00:00) | Bony 3', 73'; Mawson 55' (o.g.) | Report | Routledge 8' | Stadium: Bet365 Stadium; Attendance: 26,602; Referee: Michael Oliver |

| 6 November 2016 11 | Swansea City | 1–3 | Manchester United | Swansea |
| 15:00 GMT (UTC+00:00) | Van der Hoorn 69' | Report | Pogba 15'; Ibrahimović 21', 33' | Stadium: Liberty Stadium; Attendance: 20,938; Referee: Neil Swarbrick |

| 19 November 2016 12 | Everton | 1–1 | Swansea City | Liverpool |
| 15:00 GMT (UTC+00:00) | Coleman 89' | Report | Sigurðsson 41' (pen.) | Stadium: Goodison Park; Attendance: 38,773; Referee: Martin Atkinson |

| 26 November 2016 13 | Swansea City | 5–4 | Crystal Palace | Swansea |
| 15:00 GMT (UTC+00:00) | Sigurðsson 36'; Fer 66', 68'; Llorente 90+1', 90+3' | Report | Zaha 19'; Tomkins 75'; Cork 82' (o.g.); Benteke 84' | Stadium: Liberty Stadium; Attendance: 20,276; Referee: Kevin Friend |

| 3 December 2016 14 | Tottenham Hotspur | 5–0 | Swansea City | Tottenham, London |
| 15:00 GMT (UTC+00:00) | Kane 39' (pen.), 49'; Son 45+1'; Eriksen 70', 90+2' | Report | | Stadium: White Hart Lane; Attendance: 31,663; Referee: Jonathan Moss |

| 10 December 2016 15 | Swansea City | 3–0 | Sunderland | Swansea |
| 15:00 GMT (UTC+00:00) | Sigurðsson 51' (pen.); Llorente 54', 80' | Report | | Stadium: Liberty Stadium; Attendance: 20,453; Referee: Craig Pawson |

| 14 December 2016 16 | West Bromwich Albion | 3–1 | Swansea City | West Bromwich |
| 20:00 GMT (UTC+00:00) | Rondón 50', 61', 63' | Report | Routledge 78' | Stadium: The Hawthorns; Referee: Michael Oliver |

| 17 December 2016 17 | Middlesbrough | 3–0 | Swansea City | Middlesbrough |
| 15:00 GMT (UTC+00:00) | Negredo 18', 29' (pen.) (yellow card) 90'; De Roon 58' | Report | | Stadium: Riverside Stadium; Attendance: 28,302; Referee: Neil Swarbrick |

| 26 December 2016 18 | Swansea City | 1–4 | West Ham United | Swansea |
| 15:00 GMT (UTC+00:00) | Llorente 89' | Report | Ayew 13'; Reid 50'; Antonio 78'; Carroll 90' | Stadium: Liberty Stadium; Attendance: 20,757; Referee: Andre Marriner |

| 31 December 2016 19 | Swansea City | 0–3 | AFC Bournemouth | Swansea |
| 15:00 GMT (UTC+00:00) | | Report | Afobe 25'; Fraser 45+1'; King 88' | Stadium: Liberty Stadium; Attendance: 20,316; Referee: Kevin Friend |

| 3 January 2017 20 | Crystal Palace | 1–2 | Swansea City | Selhurst, London |
| 20:00 GMT (UTC+00:00) | Zaha 83' | Report | Mawson 42'; Rangel 88' | Stadium: Selhurst Park; Attendance: 24,913; Referee: Paul Tierney |

| 14 January 2017 21 | Swansea City | 0–4 | Arsenal | Swansea |
| 15:00 GMT (UTC+00:00) | | Report | Giroud 37'; Cork 54' (o.g.); Naughton 67' (o.g.); Sánchez 73' | Stadium: Liberty Stadium; Attendance: 20,875; Referee: Mike Jones |

| 21 January 2017 22 | Liverpool | 2–3 | Swansea City | Liverpool |
| 12:30 GMT (UTC+00:00) | Firmino 55', 69' | Report | Llorente 48', 52'; Sigurðsson 74' | Stadium: Anfield; Attendance: 53,169; Referee: Kevin Friend |

| 31 January 2017 23 | Swansea City | 2–1 | Southampton | Swansea |
| 19:45 GMT (UTC+00:00) | Mawson 38'; Sigurðsson 70' | Report | Long 57' | Stadium: Liberty Stadium; Attendance: 20,359; Referee: Roger East |

| 5 February 2017 24 | Manchester City | 2–1 | Swansea City | Manchester |
| 13:30 GMT | Jesus 11', 90+3' | Report | Sigurðsson 81' | Stadium: Etihad Stadium; Attendance: 54,065; Referee: Mike Dean |

| 12 February 2017 25 | Swansea City | 2–0 | Leicester City | Swansea |
| 16:00 GMT (UTC+00:00) | Mawson 36'; Olsson 45+2' | Report | | Stadium: Liberty Stadium; Attendance: 20,391; Referee: Jonathan Moss |

| 25 February 2017 26 | Chelsea | 3–1 | Swansea City | Fulham, London |
| 15:00 GMT (UTC+00:00) | Fàbregas 19'; Pedro 72'; Costa 84' | Report | Llorente 45+2' | Stadium: Stamford Bridge; Attendance: 41,612; Referee: Neil Swarbrick |

| 4 March 2017 27 | Swansea City | 3–2 | Burnley | Swansea |
| 15:00 GMT (UTC+00:00) | Llorente 12', 90+2'; Olsson 69' | Report | Gray 20' (pen.), 61' | Stadium: Liberty Stadium; Attendance: 20,679; Referee: Anthony Taylor |

| 11 March 2017 28 | Hull City | 2–1 | Swansea City | Kingston upon Hull |
| 15:00 GMT (UTC+00:00) | Niasse 69', 78' | Report | Mawson 90+1' | Stadium: KCOM Stadium; Attendance: 19,195; Referee: Andre Marriner |

| 18 March 2017 29 | AFC Bournemouth | 2–0 | Swansea City | Bournemouth |
| 17:30 GMT (UTC+00:00) | Mawson 31' (o.g.); Afobe 72' | Report | | Stadium: Dean Court; Attendance: 11,240; Referee: Mike Dean |

| 2 April 2017 30 | Swansea City | 0–0 | Middlesbrough | Swansea |
| 13:30 BST (UTC+01:00) | | Report | | Stadium: Liberty Stadium; Attendance: 20,354; Referee: Bobby Madley |

| 5 April 2017 31 | Swansea City | 1–3 | Tottenham Hotspur | Swansea |
| 19:45 BST (UTC+01:00) | Routledge 11' | Report | Alli 88'; Son 90+1'; Eriksen 90+4' | Stadium: Liberty Stadium; Attendance: 20,855; Referee: Jonathan Moss |

| 8 April 2017 32 | West Ham United | 1–0 | Swansea City | Stratford, London |
| 15:00 BST (UTC+01:00) | Kouyaté 44' | Report | | Stadium: London Stadium; Attendance: 56,973; Referee: Kevin Friend |

| 15 April 2017 33 | Watford | 1–0 | Swansea City | Watford |
| 15:00 BST (UTC+01:00) | Capoue 42' | Report | | Stadium: Vicarage Road; Attendance: 20,272; Referee: Lee Mason |

| 22 April 2017 34 | Swansea City | 2–0 | Stoke City | Swansea |
| 15:00 BST (UTC+01:00) | Llorente 10'; Carroll 70' | Report | | Stadium: Liberty Stadium; Attendance: 20,566; Referee: Michael Oliver |

| 30 April 2017 35 | Manchester United | 1–1 | Swansea City | Manchester |
| 12:00 BST (UTC+01:00) | Rooney 45+3' (pen.) | Report | Sigurðsson 79' | Stadium: Old Trafford; Attendance: 75,271; Referee: Neil Swarbrick |

| 6 May 2017 36 | Swansea City | 1–0 | Everton | Swansea |
| 17:30 BST (UTC+01:00) | Llorente 29' | Report | | Stadium: Liberty Stadium; Attendance: 20,827; Referee: Martin Atkinson |

| 13 May 2017 37 | Sunderland | 0–2 | Swansea City | Sunderland |
| 15:00 BST (UTC+01:00) | | Report | Llorente 9'; Naughton 45+2' | Stadium: Stadium of Light; Attendance: 38,781; Referee: Andre Marriner |

| 21 May 2017 38 | Swansea City | 2–1 | West Bromwich Albion | Swansea |
| 15:00 BST (UTC+01:00) | Ayew 72'; Llorente 86' | Report | Evans 33' | Stadium: Liberty Stadium; Attendance: 20,889; Referee: Mike Dean |

=== FA Cup ===
Win Draw Loss

| 7 January 2017 Third round | Hull City | 2–0 | Swansea City | Kingston upon Hull |
| 15:00 GMT (UTC+00:00) | Hernández 78'; Tymon 90+3' | Report | | Stadium: KCOM Stadium; Attendance: 6,608; Referee: Anthony Taylor |

=== EFL Cup ===
Win Draw Loss

| 23 August 2016 Second round | Peterborough United | 1–3 | Swansea City | Peterborough |
| 19:45 BST (UTC+01:00) | Lopes 75' | Report | Fulton 15'; McBurnie 41', 44' | Stadium: London Road; Attendance: 4,727; Referee: James Adcock |

| 21 September 2016 Third round | Swansea City | 1–2 | Manchester City | Swansea |
| 19:45 BST (UTC+01:00) | Naughton (yellow card) 55'; Sigurðsson 90+3' | Report | Clichy 49'; García 68'; Fernando (yellow card) 87' | Stadium: Liberty Stadium; Attendance: 18,237; Referee: Keith Stroud |

== Statistics ==
=== Appearances, goals and cards ===
Last updated on 21 May 2017

| No. | Pos | Player | Premier League | | | FA Cup | | | EFL Cup | | | Total | | | Discipline | |
| No. | Pos | Player | Starts | Sub | Goals | Starts | Sub | Goals | Starts | Sub | Goals | Starts | Sub | Goals | Yellow card | Red card |
|---|---|---|---|---|---|---|---|---|---|---|---|---|---|---|---|---|
| 1 | GK | (Poland) Łukasz Fabiański | 37 | 0 | 0 | – | – | – | – | – | – | 37 | 0 | 0 | 1 | – |
| 2 | DF | (Indonesia) Jordi Amat | 15 | 2 | 0 | – | – | – | 2 | 0 | 0 | 17 | 2 | 0 | 5 | – |
| 3 | FW | (Ghana) Jordan Ayew | 9 | 5 | 1 | – | – | – | – | – | – | 9 | 5 | 1 | 1 | – |
| 4 | MF | (South Korea) Ki Sung-yueng | 13 | 10 | 0 | 1 | 0 | 0 | 1 | 0 | 0 | 15 | 10 | 0 | 3 | – |
| 5 | DF | (Netherlands) Mike van der Hoorn | 7 | 0 | 1 | 1 | 0 | 0 | 2 | 0 | 0 | 10 | 0 | 1 | 1 | – |
| 6 | DF | (England) Alfie Mawson | 27 | 0 | 4 | – | – | – | 1 | 0 | 0 | 28 | 0 | 4 | 1 | – |
| 7 | MF | (England) Leon Britton | 16 | 0 | 0 | – | – | – | 2 | 0 | 0 | 18 | 0 | 0 | 3 | – |
| 8 | FW | (Netherlands) Leroy Fer | 27 | 7 | 6 | 1 | 0 | 0 | 0 | 2 | 0 | 28 | 9 | 6 | 9 | – |
| 9 | FW | (Spain) Fernando Llorente | 28 | 5 | 15 | 0 | 1 | 0 | 0 | 1 | 0 | 28 | 7 | 15 | 2 | – |
| 10 | FW | (Spain) Borja Bastón | 4 | 14 | 1 | 1 | 0 | 0 | 2 | 0 | 0 | 7 | 14 | 1 | – | – |
| 12 | MF | (England) Nathan Dyer | 3 | 5 | 0 | 1 | 0 | 0 | 1 | 0 | 0 | 5 | 5 | 0 | – | – |
| 13 | GK | (Sweden) Kristoffer Nordfeldt | 1 | 0 | 0 | 1 | 0 | 0 | 2 | 0 | 0 | 4 | 0 | 0 | – | – |
| 15 | MF | (England) Wayne Routledge | 24 | 3 | 3 | 0 | 1 | 0 | 2 | 0 | 0 | 26 | 4 | 3 | 1 | – |
| 16 | DF | (Sweden) Martin Olsson | 14 | 1 | 2 | – | – | – | – | – | – | 14 | 1 | 2 | 2 | – |
| 19 | GK | (Australia) Mark Birighitti | – | – | – | – | – | – | – | – | – | – | – | – | – | – |
| 20 | MF | (Ecuador) Jefferson Montero | 2 | 11 | 0 | – | – | – | 1 | 0 | 0 | 3 | 11 | 0 | – | – |
| 22 | DF | (Spain) Àngel Rangel | 8 | 10 | 1 | 0 | 1 | 0 | 2 | 0 | 0 | 10 | 11 | 0 | 1 | – |
| 23 | MF | (Iceland) Gylfi Sigurðsson | 37 | 1 | 9 | 1 | 0 | 0 | 0 | 1 | 1 | 38 | 2 | 10 | 2 | – |
| 24 | MF | (England) Jack Cork | 25 | 5 | 0 | 1 | 0 | 0 | 2 | 0 | 0 | 28 | 5 | 0 | 7 | – |
| 25 | GK | (Germany) Gerhard Tremmel | – | – | – | – | – | – | – | – | – | – | – | – | – | – |
| 26 | DF | (England) Kyle Naughton | 31 | 0 | 1 | 1 | 0 | 0 | 2 | 0 | 0 | 34 | 0 | 1 | 7 | – |
| 28 | MF | (Netherlands) Luciano Narsingh | 3 | 10 | 0 | – | – | – | – | – | – | 3 | 10 | 0 | – | – |
| 33 | DF | (Argentina) Federico Fernández | 27 | 0 | 0 | 1 | 0 | 0 | 0 | 1 | 0 | 28 | 1 | 0 | 7 | – |
| 35 | DF | (Scotland) Stephen Kingsley | 12 | 1 | 0 | 1 | 0 | 0 | – | – | – | 13 | 1 | 0 | – | – |
| 42 | MF | (England) Tom Carroll | 16 | 1 | 1 | – | – | – | – | – | – | 16 | 1 | 1 | 1 | – |
| 56 | MF | (Scotland) Jay Fulton | 9 | 2 | 0 | – | – | – | 2 | 0 | 1 | 11 | 2 | 1 | 2 | – |
| 62 | FW | (Scotland) Oli McBurnie | 0 | 5 | 0 | – | – | – | 1 | 0 | 2 | 1 | 5 | 2 | – | – |
Player currently away on loan
| 17 | FW | (The Gambia) Modou Barrow | 12 | 6 | 0 | – | – | – | 0 | 1 | 0 | 12 | 7 | 0 | 1 | – |
Player transferred to another club during the season
| 3 | DF | (Wales) Neil Taylor | 11 | 0 | 0 | – | – | – | 2 | 0 | 0 | 13 | 0 | 0 | 2 | – |
