= Adam King (footballer) =

Scottish footballer (born 1995)

Personal information
- Date of birth: 11 October 1995 (age 31)
- Place of birth: Edinburgh, Scotland
- Height: 5 ft 11 in (1.80 m)
- Position: Winger

Youth career
- 2005–2013: Heart of Midlothian

Senior career*
Years	Team	Apps	(Gls)
2013–2014	Heart of Midlothian	2	(0)
2014–2019	Swansea City	0	(0)
2015–2016	→ Crewe Alexandra (loan)	24	(4)
2016–2017	→ Southend United (loan)	7	(0)
2018	→ Mansfield Town (loan)	7	(0)
2018	→ Peterborough United (loan)	0	(0)
2019–2021	Dundee United	9	(0)
2020	→ Queen's Park (loan)	6	(0)
2021	→ Raith Rovers (loan)	10	(0)
2021–2023	Alloa Athletic	53	(3)

International career^{‡}
2013	Scotland U18	2	(0)
2013–2014	Scotland U19	4	(1)
2014	Scotland U21	1	(0)
- * Club domestic league appearances and goals as of 6 May 2023 ‡ National team caps and goals as of 19 November 2014

Adam King (born 11 October 1995) is a Scottish professional footballer who plays as a midfielder. King has previously played for Heart of Midlothian, Swansea City and Dundee United, and represented Scotland at Under-U18, -19 and -21 levels.

== Career ==
=== Heart of Midlothian ===
A member of the club's under-20 squad, King was predominantly a midfielder, however could also play right back and centre back. Having yet to feature for the first team in September 2013, with the transfer window coming to a close, Premier League outfit Swansea City made an offer believed to be a five-figure sum of money for King. However, Hearts administrators BDO rejected the offer. Having been included in the match day squad for every game so far that season, yet not featured, he made his first team debut for Heart of Midlothian (Hearts) as a substitute in a friendly against German Bundesliga side Wolfsburg on 13 November 2013. He made his full professional debut in a Scottish Cup tie against Celtic on 1 December 2013, coming on as a substitute in the 79th minute replacing Jamie Hamill. He went on to make his first Scottish Premiership appearance on 21 December, playing from the start against Celtic at Celtic Park.

In January, Swansea renewed their interest in King and a further bid was accepted by the club. In all he made three appearances for Hearts. He has featured at both under-18 and under-19 levels for Scotland. King was nominated by STV Sport as one of 14 young players in Scottish football to watch in 2014.

=== Swansea City ===
On 28 January 2014, King joined Premier League side Swansea City on a three-and-a-half-year contract, for an undisclosed fee. He initially joined up with the club's under-21 squad. On 3 January 2015, King made his Swansea City debut in a 6–2 FA Cup win over Tranmere Rovers. In May 2015, King won the 2014–15 Professional U21 Development League 2 title as part of the Swansea Under-21 team.

In July 2015, King joined League One team Crewe Alexandra on loan until 6 January 2016. King returned to Swansea on 5 January 2016. On 5 August of the same year he signed a season-long loan deal with League One side Southend United, but this was cut short in January 2017, with the player returning to Swansea City. On 29 January 2018 King signed on loan for League Two side Mansfield Town for the rest of the season. On 2 July 2018, he joined Peterborough United on another loan deal set to last until January 2019, but he returned to Swansea City the following month after his loan was terminated because of injury.

=== Dundee United ===
King left Swansea to join Scottish Championship club Dundee United on a three-year contract in July 2019. His brother Billy had left United the previous season. In February 2020, he joined Queen's Park of Scottish League Two on loan for the rest of the 2019–20 season. On 29 January 2021, King joined Raith Rovers on loan until the end of the season.

=== Alloa Athletic ===
King was released by Dundee United at the end of the 2020/21 season, he went on trial at Falkirk but was offered an immediate deal by Alloa Athletic and instead accepted the guaranteed deal and signed for The Wasps in June 2021.

== Career statistics ==
As of 15 May 2021

Club statistics
Club	Season	League			Cup		League Cup		Other		Total	
Club	Season	Division	Apps	Goals	Apps	Goals	Apps	Goals	Apps	Goals	Apps	Goals
Heart of Midlothian	2013–14	Scottish Premiership	2	0	1	0	0	0	0	0	3	0
Swansea City	2013–14	Premier League	0	0	0	0	0	0	0	0	0	0
Swansea City	2014–15	Premier League	0	0	1	0	0	0	0	0	1	0
Swansea City	2015–16	Premier League	0	0	0	0	0	0	0	0	0	0
Swansea City	2016–17	Premier League	0	0	0	0	0	0	0	0	0	0
Swansea City	2017–18	Premier League	0	0	0	0	1	0	4 (Note: Appearances for Swansea City under-21s in the EFL Trophy in which age-restricted sides from Premier League clubs compete against senior clubs)	2	5	2
Swansea City	2018–19	Championship	0	0	0	0	0	0	0	0	0	0
Swansea City	Total		0	0	1	0	1	0	4	2	6	2
Crewe Alexandra (loan)	2015–16	League One	24	4	1	0	1	0	0	0	26	4
Southend United (loan)	2016–17	League One	7	0	0	0	1	0	3 (Note: Appearances in the EFL Trophy)	0	11	0
Mansfield Town (loan)	2016–17	League Two	7	0	0	0	0	0	0	0	7	0
Peterborough United (loan)	2018–19	League One	0	0	0	0	0	0	0	0	0	0
Dundee United	2019–20	Scottish Championship	9	0	0	0	1	0	1 (Note: Appearance in the Scottish Challenge Cup)	0	11	0
Dundee United	2020–21	Scottish Premiership	0	0	0	0	0	0	—		0	0
Dundee United	Total		9	0	0	0	1	0	1	0	11	0
Queens Park (loan)	2019–20	Scottish League Two	6	0	0	0	0	0	0	0	6	0
Raith Rovers (loan)	2020–21	Scottish Championship	10	0	2	0	0	0	1 (Note: Appearances in the Scottish Premiership play-offs)	0	13	0
Career total			65	4	5	0	4	1	9	2	83	7

== Personal life ==
Born in Edinburgh King grew up in the Portobello area of the city a Hearts fan and attended Portobello High School. His older brother Billy is also a footballer, who plays for St Patrick's Athletic in the League of Ireland Premier Division. He has two other younger brothers, Ross and Robbie.

== Honours ==
Swansea City U23

- Premier League Cup: 2016–17
