= Wayne Routledge =

English footballer (born 1985)

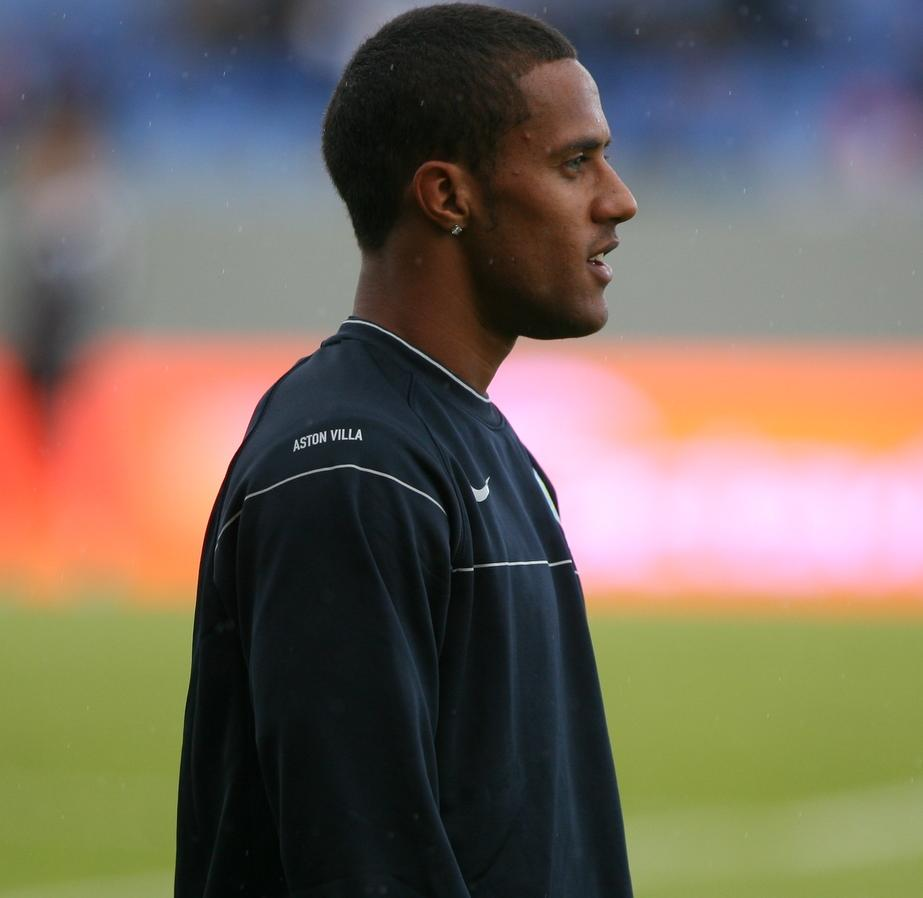
- Routledge warming up for Aston Villa in 2008

Personal information
- Full name: Wayne Neville Anthony Routledge
- Date of birth: 7 January 1985 (age 41)
- Place of birth: Sidcup, England
- Height: 5 ft 7 in (1.70 m)
- Position: Winger

Youth career
- –2001: Crystal Palace

Senior career*
Years	Team	Apps	(Gls)
2001–2005	Crystal Palace	110	(10)
2005–2008	Tottenham Hotspur	5	(0)
2006	→ Portsmouth (loan)	13	(0)
2006–2007	→ Fulham (loan)	24	(0)
2008–2009	Aston Villa	2	(0)
2008–2009	→ Cardiff City (loan)	9	(2)
2009–2010	Queens Park Rangers	44	(3)
2010–2011	Newcastle United	34	(3)
2011	→ Queens Park Rangers (loan)	20	(5)
2011–2021	Swansea City	259	(25)
Total		520	(48)

International career
2002–2004	England U19	8	(1)
2004–2007	England U21	12	(1)
- * Club domestic league appearances and goals

Wayne Neville Anthony Routledge (born 7 January 1985) is an English former professional footballer who played as a winger. He represented England at under-16, under-19 and under-21 level.

Routledge began his career in London with Crystal Palace as a youth before making senior appearances with the first team. He then moved to Premier League club Tottenham Hotspur for two years but spent part of that time on loan to Portsmouth and Fulham. He made only five appearances with Tottenham before moving to Aston Villa for one season but only made two appearances and spent part of the time with Championship club Cardiff City on loan before a permanent transfer to fellow Championship team Queens Park Rangers.

After one season with them, he moved clubs again, this time to Newcastle United, helping them to win promotion and the Championship title. During his time there, he was loaned back to QPR who also sealed the title at the end of the season. After they were promoted, Routledge signed for Swansea City in 2011, where he remained until his retirement in 2021.

== Early life ==
Routledge was born in Sidcup, London and attended Archbishop Lanfranc School in Croydon.

== Club career ==
=== Crystal Palace ===
Routledge began his career at Crystal Palace. He made his debut in the Football League First Division on 31 October 2001, replacing Jovan Kirovski for the last two minutes of a 1–0 home loss to West Bromwich Albion, aged 16 years and 297 days. On 14 September 2002, he scored his first goal in the first minute of his first start, a 4–2 home win over Wolverhampton Wanderers. A week later, he was sent off in a 3–3 draw at Watford.

He was sent off on 9 August 2003 as the season opened with a 3–2 loss at Burnley, for tripping Luke Chadwick as Palace ended with nine men. Palace won promotion to the Premiership via the play-offs in 2003–04, and he was ever present as they went straight back down in 2004–05. After rejecting a £2 million approach in January, Tottenham Hotspur signed him on a deal effective from 1 July 2005. Though he was out of contract, his age meant that he would not leave on a Bosman transfer, and the two clubs agreed a compensation of £1.5 million.

=== Tottenham Hotspur ===
Routledge made his Tottenham debut on 13 August by starting in a 2–0 win at Portsmouth but suffered a stress fracture of the foot. He made his comeback on 12 December in the return fixture, coming on after 40 minutes for Teemu Tainio and making way in the 83rd for Andy Reid in a 3–1 win at White Hart Lane.

He was loaned to Portsmouth in the January 2006 transfer window and made 13 appearances as they avoided relegation.

On 31 August 2006, he was loaned for a year to Fulham as part of the deal that brought Steed Malbranque to Spurs. He made his debut on 9 September as a 34th-minute replacement for injury victim Jimmy Bullard in a 2–1 victory at Newcastle United, where he assisted a goal for Brian McBride. On 17 January 2007, he scored the winner in a 4–3 victory over Leicester City in the FA Cup fourth round.

=== Aston Villa ===
On 30 January 2008 Routledge joined Aston Villa on an 18-month contract in a deal worth £1.5 million. He made his first-team debut on 5 April as an 86th-minute substitute for Stiliyan Petrov in a 4–0 win against Bolton.

On 10 July 2008, Routledge was the subject of a scathing verbal attack from Crystal Palace chairman Simon Jordan. Jordan was giving an interview about now ex-Palace midfielder John Bostock, during which he used Routledge as an example of why he believed the youth player should not leave Palace to join Tottenham. He said Routledge "grabbed the money" of a Tottenham move before learning his trade at Palace, and had not become a first-teamer at any of his subsequent clubs.

=== Cardiff City ===
In November 2008 after making just one league appearance for Aston Villa so far during the season, Routledge was allowed to join Championship club Cardiff City on a two-month loan deal after the club suffered a double injury blow when both Joe Ledley and Peter Whittingham were ruled out for one and three months respectively. He made his debut for the club on 22 November in a 2–1 defeat to Plymouth Argyle during which he supplied the through pass for Michael Chopra to score Cardiff's only goal of the match. He scored his first goal for the club in just his second match when he found the net against Reading during a 2–2 draw on 25 November. He soon found the net for a second time, this time scoring Cardiff's second goal in the 2–2 draw at Burnley.

In the lead up to the opening of the January transfer window it was revealed that Cardiff had offered a fee of around £300,000 thousand in order to sign Routledge on a permanent deal. The transfer was expected to be completed prior to the clubs FA Cup third round match against Reading on 3 January, but the day before Routledge rejected the deal and was subsequently recalled from his loan spell.

=== Queens Park Rangers ===
On the same day that his loan spell at Cardiff was terminated, Routledge signed a 3 1/2-year contract at fellow Championship club Queens Park Rangers for a fee of £600,000. He made his debut in a 1–1 draw with Coventry City on 10 January, and scored in his next match against Derby County a week later, where he also assisted the other goal by Mikele Leigertwood.

In a League Cup first round tie at Exeter City on 11 August 2009, Routledge scored a second half hat trick in a 5–0 win. Two weeks later, he scored in the next round, a 2–1 home win over Accrington Stanley.

=== Newcastle United ===
On 26 January 2010 Routledge signed for Newcastle United for an undisclosed fee, on a 3 1/2-year deal, and wore the number 10 shirt. He made his debut for Newcastle a day later coming on for Peter Løvenkrands in a 2–0 win over former club Crystal Palace and assisted Nile Ranger for the latter goal. Routledge scored his first goal for Newcastle in the Championship match against Coventry City with a volley from 30 yards, and also won a penalty in a 4–1 win.

After winning the Championship with Chris Hughton's Newcastle side, he competed in the Premier League again from August 2010.

==== Queens Park Rangers (loan) ====
On 21 January 2011, Routledge returned to Queens Park Rangers, signing a loan until the end of the season. He made his debut two days later and scored in a 2–1 win over Coventry at Loftus Road. On 25 April Routledge scored the goal to all but seal QPR's place in the Premier League against Hull City. It was reported on 20 April 2011 that Newcastle United had terminated his contract with mutual consent, allowing him to move to QPR permanently, but this was denied by Newcastle.

=== Swansea City ===
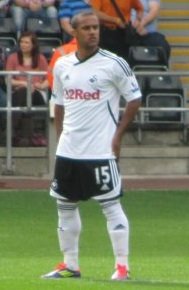
Routledge playing for Swansea City in 2011

On 4 August 2011, Swansea City announced the signing of Routledge on a three-year contract for an undisclosed fee. He made his competitive debut on 15 August, a 4–0 defeat against Manchester City at the City of Manchester Stadium. Routledge scored his first goal for Swansea on 2 January 2012, concluding a 2–0 victory against his former club Aston Villa at Villa Park. He played as Swansea won the 2013 Football League Cup Final 5–0 against Bradford City, assisting one goal by Nathan Dyer.

On 28 January 2013, Routledge signed a new four-year contract with Swansea, and on 25 September 2014, it was extended by the club until 2018. His contract was not renewed and the club confirmed on 18 May 2019 that he would be one of a number of players to be released. He re-signed for Swansea on 23 May on a new contract with reduced wages.

On 22 July 2020, Swansea overturned a five-goal deficit on the final day of the season to qualify for the Championship playoffs thanks to a 4–1 away victory over Reading and a 4–1 defeat for Nottingham Forest at home to Stoke. Routledge scored twice, including the decisive 4th goal. On 7 August 2020, Routledge signed a new one-year deal.

On 30 August 2021, Routledge's departure from the club was confirmed with the player still recovering from a knee injury sustained in the play-off semi final from the previous season, turning down a contract extension with the club. He subsequently retired from professional football in October.

== International career ==
Routledge scored once for England under-21 in a 3–3 friendly draw with Italy on 24 March 2007, the first game at the new Wembley Stadium. Manager Stuart Pearce called him up for the summer's European Championship in the Netherlands. He made two substitute appearances in the group stage for the semi-finalists.

== Career statistics ==
As of match played 17 May 2021

Appearances and goals by club, season and competition
Club	Season	League			FA Cup		League Cup		Other		Total	
Club	Season	Division	Apps	Goals	Apps	Goals	Apps	Goals	Apps	Goals	Apps	Goals
Crystal Palace	2001–02	First Division	2	0	0	0	0	0	—		2	0
Crystal Palace	2002–03	First Division	26	4	1	0	2	0	—		29	4
Crystal Palace	2003–04	First Division	44	6	1	0	4	0	3 (Note: Appearances in First Division play-offs)	0	52	6
Crystal Palace	2004–05	Premier League	38	0	1	0	1	0	—		40	0
Crystal Palace	Total		110	10	3	0	7	0	3	0	123	10
Tottenham Hotspur	2005–06	Premier League	3	0	0	0	0	0	—		3	0
Tottenham Hotspur	2006–07	Premier League	0	0	—		—		—		0	0
Tottenham Hotspur	2007–08	Premier League	2	0	0	0	0	0	0	0	2	0
Tottenham Hotspur	Total		5	0	0	0	0	0	0	0	5	0
Portsmouth (loan)	2005–06	Premier League	13	0	—		—		—		13	0
Fulham (loan)	2006–07	Premier League	24	0	3	1	1	0	—		28	1
Aston Villa	2007–08	Premier League	1	0	—		—		—		1	0
Aston Villa	2008–09	Premier League	1	0	—		1	0	5 (Note: One appearance in UEFA Intertoto Cup, four in UEFA Cup)	0	7	0
Aston Villa	Total		2	0	0	0	1	0	5	0	8	0
Cardiff City (loan)	2008–09	Championship	9	2	—		—		—		9	2
Queens Park Rangers	2008–09	Championship	19	1	0	0	—		—		19	1
Queens Park Rangers	2009–10	Championship	25	2	2	0	3	4	—		30	6
Queens Park Rangers	Total		44	3	2	0	3	4	—		49	7
Newcastle United	2009–10	Championship	17	3	—		—		—		17	3
Newcastle United	2010–11	Premier League	17	0	1	0	1	0	—		19	0
Newcastle United	Total		34	3	1	0	1	0	—		36	3
Queens Park Rangers (loan)	2010–11	Championship	20	5	—		—		—		20	5
Swansea City	2011–12	Premier League	28	1	2	0	0	0	—		30	1
Swansea City	2012–13	Premier League	36	5	2	0	6	0	—		44	5
Swansea City	2013–14	Premier League	35	2	3	1	1	0	8 (Note: Appearances in UEFA Europa League)	3	47	6
Swansea City	2014–15	Premier League	29	3	1	1	2	0	—		32	4
Swansea City	2015–16	Premier League	28	2	0	0	2	0	—		30	2
Swansea City	2016–17	Premier League	27	3	1	0	1	0	—		29	3
Swansea City	2017–18	Premier League	15	0	5	1	2	0	—		22	1
Swansea City	2018–19	Championship	24	5	2	0	0	0	—		26	5
Swansea City	2019–20	Championship	21	4	0	0	3	1	0	0	24	5
Swansea City	2020–21	Championship	16	0	2	1	1	0	1 (Note: Appearance in Championship play-offs)	0	20	1
Swansea City	Total		259	25	18	4	18	1	9	3	304	33
Career total			520	48	27	5	31	5	17	3	595	61

== Honours ==
Crystal Palace

- Football League First Division play-offs: 2004

Newcastle United

- Football League Championship: 2009–10

Queens Park Rangers

- Football League Championship: 2010–11

Swansea City

- Football League Cup: 2012–13
