= Federico Fernández (footballer) =

Argentine footballer (born 1989)

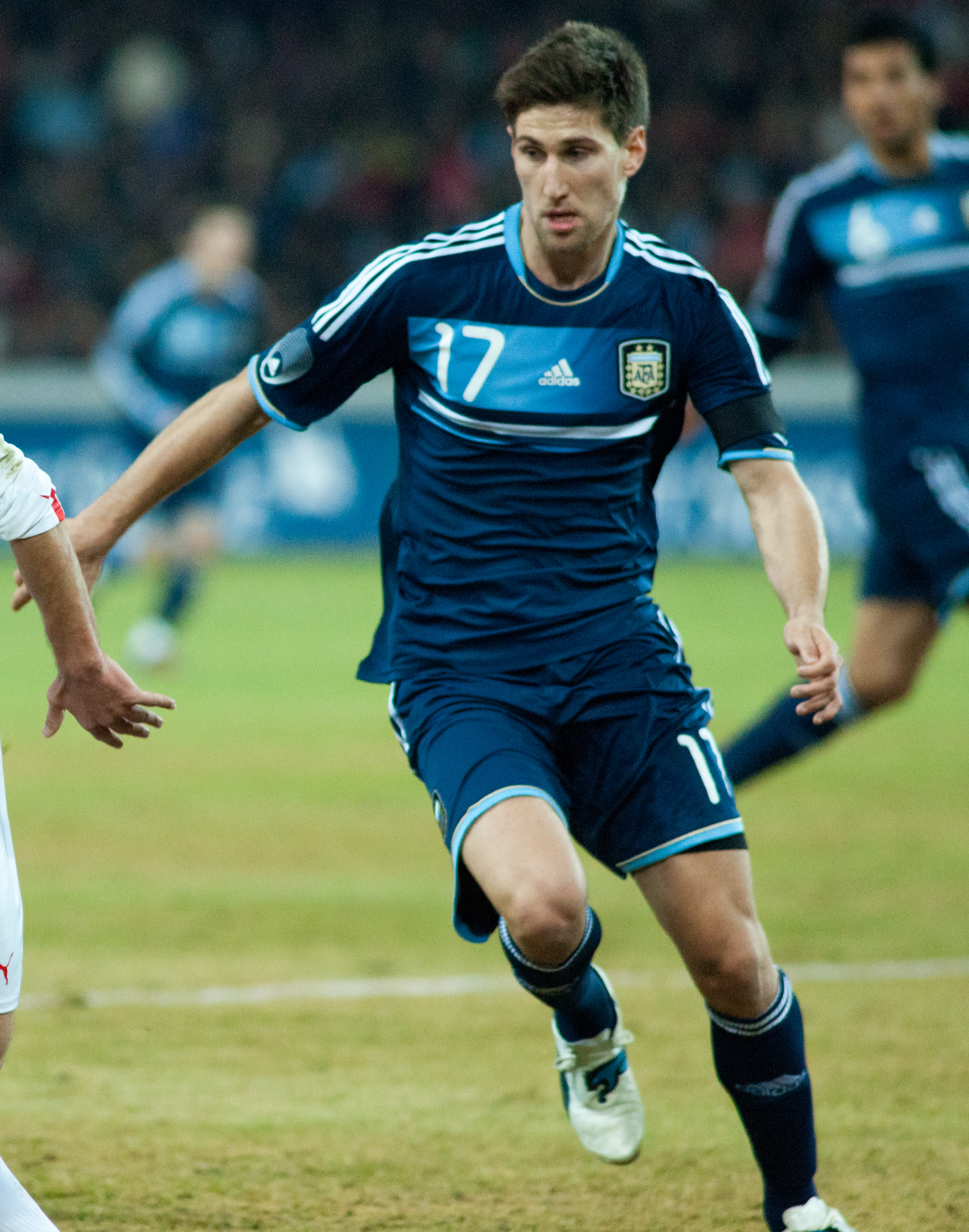
- Fernández playing for Argentina in 2012

Personal information
- Full name: Federico Fernández
- Date of birth: 21 February 1989 (age 37)
- Place of birth: Tres Algarrobos, Argentina
- Height: 1.90 m (6 ft 3 in)
- Position: Centre-back

Senior career*
Years	Team	Apps	(Gls)
2008–2011	Estudiantes	59	(4)
2011–2014	Napoli	44	(0)
2013	→ Getafe (loan)	14	(1)
2014–2018	Swansea City	118	(2)
2018–2022	Newcastle United	82	(2)
2022	Elche	1	(0)
2023	Al-Duhail	9	(1)
2023–2024	Estudiantes	29	(0)
Total		356	(10)

International career
2009	Argentina U20	2	(0)
2011–2014	Argentina	32	(3)
Medal record
Representing Argentina
FIFA World Cup
Runner-up	2014 Brazil
- * Club domestic league appearances and goals

Federico Fernández (Latin American Spanish: [feðeˈɾiko feɾˈnandes]; born 21 February 1989) is an Argentine former professional footballer who played as a centre-back.

Fernández began his career at Estudiantes, where he reached the final of the Copa Sudamericana and won the Copa Libertadores, before moving to Napoli in 2011. He was used sparingly by the Serie A club, and spent time on loan at Getafe, before joining Swansea City in 2014. He joined English club Newcastle United in 2018. He left in 2022 and had shorts spells at Elche in Spain and Al-Duhail in Qatar, before returning to Estudiantes, where he retired from professional football in 2024.

Fernández made his full international debut for Argentina in April 2011 and earned over 30 international caps, scoring three goals. He was part of the Argentine squad for the 2014 World Cup, where they lost 1–0 to Germany in the final.

== Early life ==
Federico Fernández was born 21 February 1989, in Tres Algarrobos, Argentina, a town in the province of Buenos Aires. He holds Italian heritage, as his maternal great-grandfather was a native of Lacedonia, in the province of Avellino. As a result, Fernández also possesses an Italian passport.

== Club career ==
=== Estudiantes ===
Fernández made his league debut for Estudiantes de La Plata on 14 September 2008 during the 2008 Apertura tournament in a 1–0 defeat to Vélez Sársfield. He played two games in Estudiantes' run to the final of Copa Sudamericana 2008.

Fernández scored his first goal with the squad in an away match against Lanús on 2 May 2009, following an assist by teammate Juan Sebastián Verón. Later that year, Estudiantes won the 2009 Copa Libertadores, although Fernández's only contributions were two substitute appearances against Defensor Sporting Club in the quarter-finals.

=== Napoli ===
Fernández was signed by Serie A club Napoli in December 2010 for a reported fee of about €2.5 million. Due to his lack of a European Union passport, however, he arrived in Italy only in July 2011.

On 2 November 2011, Fernández scored his first two goals for Napoli, against Bayern Munich in a Champions League group stage away tie. Both headers came after Napoli had conceded three times in the first half, although Napoli lost the match 3–2.

Having only made nine appearances across all competitions for Napoli that season, on 31 January 2013 Fernández was loaned to Spanish La Liga club Getafe for the remainder of the campaign, bolstering the club's defence following the sale of compatriot David Abraham to Hoffenheim.

Fernández played the full 90 minutes of the 2014 Coppa Italia Final, which Napoli won 3–1 against Fiorentina.

=== Swansea City ===
On 20 August 2014, it was announced that Fernández had signed for Premier League side Swansea City on a four-year contract for €10 million. Six days later, he made his debut for the club, playing the entirety of a 1–0 win over Rotherham United in the second round of the League Cup. His first Premier League appearance for Swansea was on 13 September, replacing Jordi Amat at half-time in a 4–2 defeat away to Chelsea.

Fernández was given a straight red card for a foul on Philippe Coutinho in added time at the end of Swansea's League Cup fourth-round match against Liverpool at Anfield on 28 October; minutes later, Dejan Lovren scored the winner to knock Swansea out of the tournament. Two days later, however, the FA rescinded the red card on appeal from Swansea, thus avoiding a three-match ban for Fernández. On the opening day of the 2015–16 season, he scored an own goal vs Chelsea, in a match that ended 2–2 at Stamford Bridge. He scored his first goal for Swansea on 19 March 2016 in a 1–0 victory over Aston Villa at the Liberty Stadium.

=== Newcastle United ===
On 9 August 2018, Fernández joined Newcastle United on a two-year contract. The move reunited him with Rafael Benítez, his manager when both were at Napoli. He scored his first Premier League goal on 2 November 2019 in a 3–2 away win at West Ham United. His second Newcastle goal came in a 2–1 Premier League home win against Southampton.

On 7 July 2021, it was announced that Fernández had signed a new contract extension with Newcastle, alongside teammates Jacob Murphy and Dwight Gayle.

=== Elche ===
On 1 September 2022, Fernández left Newcastle, signing a one-year contract with Spanish club Elche. He left the club in December, after appearing just once for Elche.

=== Al-Duhail ===
On 4 February 2023, Fernández joined Qatari side Al-Duhail.

=== Estudiantes and retirement ===
On 17 August 2023, Fernández returned to Argentina, joining fellow clubEstudiantes.

On 12 December 2024, Fernández announced that he would retire from professional football after the Trofeo de Campeones de la Liga Profesional match. On 21 December, at the 2024 Trofeo de Campeones de la Liga Profesional match against Vélez Sarsfield, he played his last professional game and won the match.

== International career ==
In January 2009, Fernández was selected to join the Argentina under-20 squad for the 2009 South American Youth Championship in Venezuela.

Fernández made his debut for the Argentina senior team against Ecuador in April 2011. He established himself as a regular in defence during Argentina's successful FIFA World Cup qualification campaign under head coach Alejandro Sabella.

In June 2014, Fernández was named in Argentina's squad for the 2014 World Cup. He made his World Cup debut in Argentina's 2–1 win against Bosnia and Herzegovina at the Maracanã Stadium, playing the full match in defence. He was an unused substitute in Argentina's 0–1 defeat to Germany in the final.

== Personal life ==
Fernández has a wife, Florencia. The couple have two daughters, Valentina and Victoria, and one son, Viggo.

== Career statistics ==
=== Club ===
Appearances and goals by club, season and competition
Club	Season	League			National cup		League cup		Continental		Total	
Club	Season	Division	Apps	Goals	Apps	Goals	Apps	Goals	Apps	Goals	Apps	Goals
Estudiantes	2008–09	Argentine Primera División	14	2	0	0	—		5	0	19	2
Estudiantes	2009–10	Argentine Primera División	12	1	0	0	—		4	1	16	2
Estudiantes	2010–11	Argentine Primera División	33	1	0	0	—		12	1	45	2
Estudiantes	Total		59	4	0	0	—		21	2	80	6
Napoli	2011–12	Serie A	16	0	1	0	—		2	2	19	2
Napoli	2012–13	Serie A	2	0	1	0	—		6	0	9	0
Napoli	2013–14	Serie A	26	0	4	0	—		6	0	36	0
Napoli	Total		44	0	6	0	—		14	2	64	2
Getafe (loan)	2012–13	La Liga	14	1	0	0	—		—		14	1
Swansea City	2014–15	Premier League	28	0	1	0	3	0	—		32	0
Swansea City	2015–16	Premier League	32	1	0	0	0	0	—		32	1
Swansea City	2016–17	Premier League	27	0	1	0	1	0	—		29	0
Swansea City	2017–18	Premier League	30	1	3	0	1	0	—		34	1
Swansea City	2018–19	Championship	1	0	0	0	0	0	—		1	0
Swansea City	Total		118	2	5	0	5	0	—		128	2
Newcastle United	2018–19	Premier League	19	0	2	0	1	0	—		22	0
Newcastle United	2019–20	Premier League	32	2	2	0	1	0	—		35	2
Newcastle United	2020–21	Premier League	24	0	0	0	1	0	—		25	0
Newcastle United	2021–22	Premier League	7	0	0	0	0	0	—		7	0
Newcastle United	Total		82	2	4	0	3	0	—		89	2
Elche CF	2022–23	La Liga	1	0	0	0	0	0	—		1	0
Elche CF	Total		1	0	0	0	0	0	—		1	0
Career total			318	10	15	0	8	0	35	4	376	14

=== International ===
Appearances and goals by national team and year
National team	Year	Apps	Goals
Argentina	2011	5	1
Argentina	2012	9	1
Argentina	2013	9	0
Argentina	2014	9	1
Total		32	3

Scores and results list Argentina's goal tally first, score column indicates score after each Fernández goal.

List of international goals scored by Federico Fernández
No.	Date	Venue	Opponent	Score	Result	Competition
1	25 May 2011	Estadio Centenario, Resistencia, Argentina	Paraguay	2–1	4–2	Friendly
2	9 June 2012	MetLife Stadium, East Rutherford, United States	Brazil	3–3	4–3	Friendly
3	3 September 2014	Esprit Arena, Düsseldorf, Germany	Germany	3–0	4–2	Friendly

== Honours ==
Estudiantes

- Copa Libertadores: 2009
- Argentine Primera División: 2010 Apertura
- Copa de la Liga Profesional: 2024
- Trofeo de Campeones de la Liga Profesional: 2024

Napoli

- Coppa Italia: 2011–12, 2013–14

Argentina

- FIFA World Cup runner-up: 2014
