= Mjölby Södra IF =

Swedish football club

- Full name: Mjölby Södra Idrottsförening
- Founded: 1948
- Ground: Lundbyvallen; Mjölby; Sweden
- League: Division 4 Östergötland Västra
Home colours	Away colours

Mjölby Södra IF is a Swedish football club located in Mjölby.

== Background ==
Mjölby Södra IF currently plays in Division 4 Östergötland Västra which is the sixth tier of Swedish football. They play their home matches at the Lundbyvallen in Mjölby.

The club are affiliated to Östergötlands Fotbollförbund. Mjölby Södra IF played in the 2007 Svenska Cupen but lost 0–4 at home to Rynninge IK in the first round.

== Season to season ==
In their most successful period Mjölby Södra IF competed in the following divisions:

Season	Level	Division	Section	Position	Movements
1960	Tier 4	Division 4	Östergötland Västra	1st	Promoted
1961	Tier 3	Division 3	Nordöstra Götaland	10th	Relegated
1962	Tier 4	Division 4	Östergötland Västra	3rd	
1963	Tier 4	Division 4	Östergötland Västra	1st	Promoted
1964	Tier 3	Division 3	Nordöstra Götaland	7th	
1965	Tier 3	Division 3	Nordöstra Götaland	4th	
1966	Tier 3	Division 3	Nordöstra Götaland	7th	
1967	Tier 3	Division 3	Nordöstra Götaland	6th	
1968	Tier 3	Division 3	Nordöstra Götaland	11th	Relegated
1969	Tier 4	Division 4	Östergötland Västra	8th	
1970	Tier 4	Division 4	Östergötland Västra	7th	

In recent seasons Mjölby Södra IF have competed in the following divisions:

Season	Level	Division	Section	Position	Movements
1999	Tier 5	Division 4	Östergötland Västra	7th	
2000	Tier 5	Division 4	Östergötland Västra	7th	
2001	Tier 5	Division 4	Östergötland Västra	4th	
2002	Tier 5	Division 4	Östergötland Västra	3rd	
2003	Tier 5	Division 4	Östergötland Västra	3rd	
2004	Tier 5	Division 4	Östergötland Västra	10th	Relegated
2005	Tier 6	Division 5	Östergötland Västra	8th	
2006*	Tier 7	Division 5	Östergötland Västra	4th	
2007	Tier 7	Division 5	Östergötland Västra	1st	Promoted
2008	Tier 6	Division 4	Östergötland Västra	11th	Relegated
2009	Tier 7	Division 5	Östergötland Västra	1st	Promoted
2010	Tier 6	Division 4	Östergötland Västra	7th	
2011	Tier 6	Division 4	Östergötland Västra		

* League restructuring in 2006 resulted in a new division being created at Tier 3 and subsequent divisions dropping a level.
