= 2014–15 Professional U18 Development League =

The 2014–15 Professional U18 Development League season was the third season of the Professional Development League system.

== League 1 ==
Barclays U18 Premier League
- Season: 2014–15
- Champions: Middlesbrough U18s (1st Title)
- Matches: 348
- Goals: 1,229 (3.53 per match)
- Top goalscorer: (England) Tammy Abraham Chelsea U18s (23 Goals)
- Biggest home win: Chelsea U18s 12–2 Aston Villa U18s (11 October 2014)
- Biggest away win: Bolton Wanderers U18s 0–7 Manchester City U18s (1 November 2014)
- Highest scoring: Chelsea U18s 12–2 Aston Villa U18s (11 October 2014) League Record
- Longest winning run: 6 Matches – Middlesbrough U18s (25 October 2014 – 6 December 2014); Tottenham Hotspur U18s (14 October 2014 – 29 November 2014)
- Longest unbeaten run: 10 Matches – Chelsea U18s (14 November 2014 – 13 February 2015)
- Longest winless run: 15 Matches – Norwich City U18s (28 August 2014 – 24 January 2015)
- Longest losing run: 7 Matches – Bolton Wanderers U18s (20 September 2014 – 1 November 2014)

The league was split into two regional divisions – north and south. After playing each team in their own division twice, the league was split into a second league stage consisting of three further divisions. The winning team of Group A in the second league stage was the overall champion and qualified for the UEFA Youth League in the 2015–16 season.

=== First League Stage ===
==== North Division ====
| Pos | Team | Pld | W | D | L | GF | GA | GD | Pts | Qualification |
|---|---|---|---|---|---|---|---|---|---|---|
| 1 | Middlesbrough U18s | 22 | 16 | 2 | 4 | 59 | 30 | +29 | 50 | Group A |
| 2 | Everton U18s | 22 | 13 | 2 | 7 | 49 | 30 | +19 | 41 | Group A |
| 3 | Manchester City U18s | 22 | 12 | 4 | 6 | 45 | 29 | +16 | 40 | Group A |
| 4 | Manchester United U18s | 22 | 12 | 2 | 8 | 29 | 24 | +5 | 38 | Group A |
| 5 | Wolverhampton Wanderers U18s | 22 | 11 | 4 | 7 | 38 | 36 | +2 | 37 | Group B |
| 6 | Derby County U18s | 22 | 8 | 9 | 5 | 47 | 36 | +11 | 33 | Group B |
| 7 | Liverpool U18s | 22 | 8 | 5 | 9 | 51 | 51 | 0 | 29 | Group B |
| 8 | Sunderland U18s | 22 | 8 | 5 | 9 | 33 | 35 | −2 | 29 | Group B |
| 9 | Newcastle United U18s | 22 | 6 | 3 | 13 | 36 | 50 | −14 | 21 | Group C |
| 10 | Blackburn Rovers U18s | 22 | 5 | 5 | 12 | 31 | 50 | −19 | 20 | Group C |
| 11 | Stoke City U18s | 22 | 5 | 4 | 13 | 23 | 39 | −16 | 19 | Group C |
| 12 | Bolton Wanderers U18s | 22 | 3 | 5 | 14 | 22 | 53 | −31 | 14 | Group C |

==== South Division ====
| Pos | Team | Pld | W | D | L | GF | GA | GD | Pts | Qualification |
|---|---|---|---|---|---|---|---|---|---|---|
| 1 | Chelsea U18s | 22 | 15 | 3 | 4 | 69 | 35 | +34 | 48 | Group A |
| 2 | Tottenham Hotspur U18s | 22 | 11 | 5 | 6 | 49 | 38 | +11 | 38 | Group A |
| 3 | Aston Villa U18s | 22 | 11 | 5 | 6 | 48 | 48 | 0 | 38 | Group A |
| 4 | West Bromwich Albion U18s | 22 | 10 | 4 | 8 | 36 | 39 | −3 | 34 | Group A |
| 5 | Reading U18s | 22 | 10 | 3 | 9 | 39 | 37 | +2 | 33 | Group B |
| 6 | West Ham United U18s | 22 | 9 | 5 | 8 | 45 | 35 | +10 | 32 | Group B |
| 7 | Leicester City U18s | 22 | 10 | 2 | 10 | 36 | 29 | +7 | 32 | Group B |
| 8 | Brighton & Hove Albion U18s | 22 | 8 | 3 | 11 | 37 | 40 | −3 | 27 | Group B |
| 9 | Fulham U18s | 22 | 8 | 3 | 11 | 34 | 45 | −11 | 27 | Group C |
| 10 | Southampton U18s | 22 | 6 | 5 | 11 | 28 | 34 | −6 | 23 | Group C |
| 11 | Arsenal U18s | 22 | 6 | 5 | 11 | 33 | 42 | −9 | 23 | Group C |
| 12 | Norwich City U18s | 22 | 5 | 3 | 14 | 19 | 51 | −32 | 18 | Group C |

=== Second league stage ===
==== Group A ====
| Pos | Team | Pld | W | D | L | GF | GA | GD | Pts | Qualification |
|---|---|---|---|---|---|---|---|---|---|---|
| 1 | Middlesbrough U18s (C) | 7 | 5 | 1 | 1 | 17 | 10 | +7 | 16 | Qualification for 2015–16 UEFA Youth League |
| 2 | Everton U18s | 7 | 4 | 2 | 1 | 17 | 7 | +10 | 14 | |
| 3 | Chelsea U18s | 7 | 4 | 1 | 2 | 18 | 14 | +4 | 13 | |
| 4 | Manchester United U18s | 7 | 3 | 2 | 2 | 9 | 8 | +1 | 11 | |
| 5 | West Bromwich Albion U18s | 7 | 3 | 0 | 4 | 17 | 15 | +2 | 9 | |
| 6 | Aston Villa U18s | 7 | 2 | 2 | 3 | 10 | 17 | −7 | 8 | |
| 7 | Manchester City U18s | 7 | 1 | 1 | 5 | 9 | 17 | −8 | 4 | |
| 8 | Tottenham Hotspur U18s | 7 | 1 | 1 | 5 | 12 | 21 | −9 | 4 | |

(C) Champions

==== Group B ====
| Pos | Team | Pld | W | D | L | GF | GA | GD | Pts |
|---|---|---|---|---|---|---|---|---|---|
| 9 | Sunderland U18s | 7 | 4 | 2 | 1 | 9 | 5 | +4 | 14 |
| 10 | Reading U18s | 7 | 4 | 1 | 2 | 10 | 6 | +4 | 13 |
| 11 | Wolverhampton Wanderers U18s | 7 | 3 | 3 | 1 | 16 | 5 | +11 | 12 |
| 12 | Derby County U18s | 7 | 4 | 0 | 3 | 10 | 10 | 0 | 12 |
| 13 | Leicester City U18s | 7 | 3 | 0 | 4 | 14 | 13 | +1 | 9 |
| 14 | West Ham United U18s | 7 | 2 | 1 | 4 | 6 | 10 | −4 | 7 |
| 15 | Liverpool U18s | 7 | 2 | 1 | 4 | 12 | 17 | −5 | 7 |
| 16 | Brighton & Hove Albion U18s | 7 | 1 | 2 | 4 | 9 | 20 | −11 | 5 |

==== Group C ====
| Pos | Team | Pld | W | D | L | GF | GA | GD | Pts |
|---|---|---|---|---|---|---|---|---|---|
| 17 | Stoke City U18s | 7 | 4 | 2 | 1 | 18 | 11 | +7 | 14 |
| 18 | Blackburn Rovers U18s | 7 | 4 | 2 | 1 | 13 | 8 | +5 | 14 |
| 19 | Newcastle United U18s | 7 | 3 | 1 | 3 | 14 | 9 | +5 | 10 |
| 20 | Southampton U18s | 7 | 3 | 1 | 3 | 10 | 12 | −2 | 10 |
| 21 | Fulham U18s | 7 | 2 | 3 | 2 | 13 | 11 | +2 | 9 |
| 22 | Bolton Wanderers U18s | 7 | 2 | 3 | 2 | 9 | 10 | −1 | 9 |
| 23 | Norwich City U18s | 7 | 2 | 1 | 4 | 11 | 15 | −4 | 7 |
| 24 | Arsenal U18s | 7 | 1 | 1 | 5 | 10 | 22 | −12 | 4 |

=== Top goalscorers ===
As of 20 May 2015

| Rank | Player | Club | Goals |
|---|---|---|---|
| 1 | (England) Tammy Abraham | Chelsea U18s | 23 |
| 2 | (England) Rushian Hepburn-Murphy | Aston Villa U18s | 19 |
| 3 | (England) Shayon Harrison | Tottenham Hotspur U18s | 18 |
| 4 | (England) Charles Vernam | Derby County U18s | 17 |
| 5 | (England) Sam Joel | Blackburn Rovers U18s | 16 |
| 5 | (Republic of the Congo) Offrande Zanzala | Derby County U18s | 16 |
| 7 | (England) Ryan Loft | Tottenham Hotspur U18s | 14 |
| 7 | (England) Junior Mondal | Middlesbrough U18s | 14 |
| 7 | (England) Alex Pattison | Middlesbrough U18s | 14 |
| 7 | (Wales) Jamie Thomas | Bolton Wanderers U18s | 14 |
| 11 | (England) Marcus Barnes | Southampton U18s | 13 |
| 11 | (England) Harry Chapman | Middlesbrough U18s | 13 |
| 11 | (England) Sean Longstaff | Newcastle United U18s | 13 |
| 11 | (England) Harry McKirdy | Aston Villa U18s | 13 |
| 11 | (England) Andre Wright | West Bromwich Albion U18s | 13 |
| 11 | (England) Tahvon Campbell | West Bromwich Albion U18s | 12 |
| 11 | (England) Keenan King | Leicester City U18s | 12 |
| 11 | (England) Stephy Mavididi | Arsenal U18s | 12 |
| 11 | (England) Marcus Rashford | Manchester United U18s | 12 |

=== Hat-tricks ===
As of 20 May 2015

| Player | For | Against | Result | Date | Ref. |
|---|---|---|---|---|---|
| (England) Tom Shepherd | Stoke City U18s | Liverpool U18s | 7–1 (H) | 16 August 2014 | |
| (England) Delial Brewster | Everton U18s | Middlesbrough U18s | 6–3 (H) | 16 August 2014 | |
| (Jamaica) Demetri Mitchell | Manchester United U18s | Newcastle United U18s | 2–3 (A) | 23 August 2014 | |
| (Wales) Jamie Thomas^{4} | Bolton Wanderers U18s | Blackburn Rovers U18s | 5–1 (H) | 23 August 2014 | |
| (England) Junior Mondal | Middlesbrough U18s | Bolton Wanderers U18s | 0–6 (A) | 30 August 2014 | |
| (England) Stephy Mavididi | Arsenal U18s | Norwich City U18s | 0–3 (A) | 13 September 2014 | |
| (England) Tammy Abraham | Chelsea U18s | Tottenham Hotspur U18s | 2–4 (A) | 27 September 2014 | |
| (England) Oliver Rathbone | Manchester United U18s | Blackburn Rovers U18s | 1–4 (A) | 11 October 2014 | |
| (England) James Tilley | Brighton & Hove Albion U18s | Tottenham Hotspur U18s | 1–5 (A) | 11 October 2014 | |
| (England) Marcus Barnes | Southampton U18s | Fulham U18s | 4–0 (H) | 11 October 2014 | |
| (Ivory Coast) Jeremie Boga | Chelsea U18s | Aston Villa U18s | 12–2 (H) | 11 October 2014 | |
| (Switzerland) Miro Muheim | Chelsea U18s | Aston Villa U18s | 12–2 (H) | 11 October 2014 | |
| (England) Will Marsh | Liverpool U18s | Blackburn Rovers U18s | 5–0 (H) | 18 October 2014 | |
| (England) Denzeil Boadu | Manchester City U18s | Bolton Wanderers U18s | 0–7 (A) | 1 November 2014 | |
| (Spain) Sergi Canos | Liverpool U18s | Derby County U18s | 5–5 (A) | 22 November 2014 | |
| (England) Harry McKirdy | Aston Villa U18s | Fulham U18s | 1–7 (A) | 20 December 2014 | |
| (Republic of Ireland) Rory Hale | Aston Villa U18s | Fulham U18s | 1–7 (A) | 20 December 2014 | |
| (England) Charles Vernam | Derby County U18s | Everton U18s | 4–1 (H) | 20 December 2014 | |
| (Canada) Ike Ugbo | Chelsea U18s | Aston Villa U18s | 3–8 (A) | 11 January 2015 | |
| (Sweden) Zackarias Faour | Manchester City U18s | Liverpool U18s | 3–2 (H) | 24 January 2015 | |
| (England) Nathan Holland | Everton U18s | Newcastle United U18s | 5–1 (H) | 7 February 2015 | |
| (England) Harry Chapman^{4} | Middlesbrough U18s | Wolverhampton Wanderers U18s | 7–1 (H) | 14 February 2015 | |
| (England) Charles Vernam | Derby County U18s | Bolton Wanderers U18s | 1–6 (A) | 14 February 2015 | |
| (England) Shayon Harrison | Tottenham Hotspur U18s | Arsenal U18s | 4–1 (H) | 25 February 2015 | |
| (England) Niall Ennis | Wolverhampton Wanderers U18s | Derby County U18s | 3–0 (H) | 14 March 2015 | |
| (England) Shayon Harrison^{4} | Tottenham Hotspur U18s | Chelsea U18s | 4–6 (H) | 14 March 2015 | |
| (England) Tammy Abraham | Chelsea U18s | Tottenham Hotspur U18s | 4–6 (A) | 14 March 2015 | |
| (Scotland) Jamie Holmes | Newcastle United U18s | Arsenal U18s | 6–0 (H) | 18 April 2015 | |
| (England) Sam Joel | Blackburn Rovers U18s | Norwich City U18s | 4–2 (H) | 18 April 2015 | |
| (Republic of Ireland) Ryan Rainey | Wolverhampton Wanderers U18s | Brighton & Hove Albion U18s | 8–0 (H) | 9 May 2015 | |

Note

(H) – Home; (A) – Away
^{4} – player scored 4 goals

== League 2 ==
Professional Development U18 League
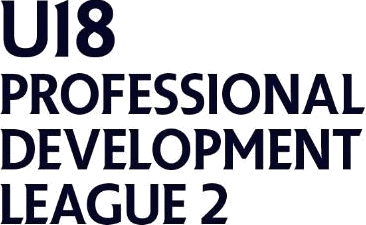
- Season: 2014–15
- Champions: Charlton Athletic U18s (1st Title)
- Matches: 255 (252 RS, 3 PO)
- Goals: 871 (3.42 per match) ( 864 RS, 7 PO)
- Top goalscorer: (Wales) Eli Phipps Cardiff City U18s (21 Goals)
- Biggest home win: Swansea City U18s 8–0 Colchester United U18s (31 January 2015)
- Biggest away win: Sheffield Wednesday U18s 3–9 Birmingham City U18s (23 August 2014); Bristol City U18s 0–6 Coventry City U18s (13 September 2014); Queens Park Rangers U18s 0–6 Birmingham City U18s (27 September 2014)
- Highest scoring: Sheffield Wednesday U18s 3–9 Birmingham City U18s (23 August 2014)
- Longest winning run: 10 Matches – Charlton Athletic U18s (28 February 2015 – 12 May 2015)
- Longest unbeaten run: 16 Matches – Nottingham Forest U18s (1 November 2014 – 11 April 2015)
- Longest winless run: 9 Matches – Bristol City U18s (22 November 2014 – 28 February 2015); Sheffield United U18s (22 November 2014 – 28 February 2015)
- Longest losing run: 9 Matches – Sheffield United U18s (22 November 2014 – 28 February 2015)

League 2, referred to as the Professional Development U18 League, is split into two regional divisions.

Teams will play each team in their own division twice, and each team in the other division once, for a total of 26 games for North division teams, and 27 games each for South division teams.

At the end of the season, the teams finishing in the top two positions of both divisions will meet in the knockout stage to determine the overall league champion.

=== League stage ===
==== North Division ====
| Pos | Team | Pld | W | D | L | GF | GA | GD | Pts | Qualification |
|---|---|---|---|---|---|---|---|---|---|---|
| 1 | Huddersfield Town U18s | 26 | 16 | 4 | 6 | 50 | 31 | +19 | 52 | Qualification for Knock-out stage |
| 2 | Nottingham Forest U18s | 26 | 15 | 5 | 6 | 52 | 25 | +27 | 50 | Qualification for Knock-out stage |
| 3 | Birmingham City U18s | 26 | 12 | 5 | 9 | 49 | 33 | +16 | 41 | |
| 4 | Coventry City U18s | 26 | 11 | 7 | 8 | 51 | 38 | +13 | 40 | |
| 5 | Sheffield Wednesday U18s | 26 | 10 | 7 | 9 | 37 | 38 | −1 | 37 | |
| 6 | Leeds United U18s | 26 | 9 | 4 | 13 | 39 | 40 | −1 | 31 | |
| 7 | Crewe Alexandra U18s | 26 | 9 | 4 | 13 | 40 | 50 | −10 | 31 | |
| 8 | Barnsley U18s | 26 | 8 | 7 | 11 | 26 | 38 | −12 | 31 | |
| 9 | Sheffield United U18s | 26 | 8 | 3 | 15 | 37 | 59 | −22 | 27 | |

==== South Division ====
| Pos | Team | Pld | W | D | L | GF | GA | GD | Pts | Qualification |
|---|---|---|---|---|---|---|---|---|---|---|
| 1 | Charlton Athletic U18s | 27 | 18 | 2 | 7 | 61 | 37 | +24 | 56 | Qualification for Knock-out stage |
| 2 | Brentford U18s | 27 | 16 | 6 | 5 | 55 | 36 | +19 | 54 | Qualification for Knock-out stage |
| 3 | Ipswich Town U18s | 27 | 14 | 3 | 10 | 49 | 44 | +5 | 45 | |
| 4 | Crystal Palace U18s | 27 | 11 | 5 | 11 | 53 | 41 | +12 | 38 | |
| 5 | Swansea City U18s | 27 | 10 | 6 | 11 | 54 | 43 | +11 | 36 | |
| 6 | Cardiff City U18s | 27 | 10 | 6 | 11 | 52 | 53 | −1 | 36 | |
| 7 | Queens Park Rangers U18s | 27 | 10 | 1 | 16 | 45 | 78 | −33 | 31 | |
| 8 | Bristol City U18s | 27 | 8 | 4 | 15 | 36 | 56 | −20 | 28 | |
| 9 | Millwall U18s | 27 | 8 | 3 | 16 | 41 | 54 | −13 | 27 | |
| 10 | Colchester United U18s | 27 | 7 | 2 | 18 | 37 | 70 | −33 | 23 | |

=== Knock-out stage ===
==== Semifinals ====
26 April 2015
11:00

| Charlton Athletic U18s | 3–0 | Nottingham Forest U18s |
|---|---|---|
| Umerah 56'; Hanlan 90'; Lapslie 90' | Report |

The Valley, London
Attendance: 200

27 April 2015
14:00

| Huddersfield Town U18s | 1–2 | Brentford U18s |
|---|---|---|
| Pyke 43' | Report | Owens 52'; Clayton 65' |

John Smith's Stadium, Huddersfield

==== Final ====
12 May 2015
19:00

| Brentford U18s | 0–1 | Charlton Athletic U18s |
|---|---|---|
| | Report | Umerah 6' |

Griffin Park, London
Attendance: 656

=== Top goalscorers ===
As of 12 May 2015

| Rank | Player | Club | Goals |
|---|---|---|---|
| 1 | (Wales) Eli Phipps | Cardiff City U18s | 21 |
| 2 | (England) Joshua Umerah | Charlton Athletic U18s | 20 |
| 3 | (Nigeria) Ademola Lookman | Charlton Athletic U18s | 17 |
| 4 | (Wales) Owain Jones | Swansea City U18s | 15 |
| 5 | (England) Bradley Clayton | Brentford U18s | 14 |
| 5 | (England) Michael Phillips | Crystal Palace U18s | 14 |
| 7 | (England) Kasheme Walton | Nottingham Forest U18s | 13 |
| 8 | (Wales) George Thomas | Coventry City U18s | 12 |
| 9 | (Wales) Kyle Copp | Swansea City U18s | 11 |
| 9 | (England) Mason Duffy | Sheffield Wednesday U18s | 11 |
| 9 | (England) Kyle McFarlane | Birmingham City U18s | 11 |
| 12 | (England) Brandon Adams | Queens Park Rangers U18s | 10 |
| 12 | (England) John-Prince Rylah | Millwall U18s | 10 |
| 12 | (Republic of Ireland) Frank Mulhern | Leeds United U18s | 10 |

== League 3 ==
Football League Youth Alliance
- Season: 2014–15
- Champions: North-East Division; Bradford City U18s; North-West Division; Bury U18s; South-East Division; Barnet U18s; South-West Division; AFC Bournemouth U18s
- Matches: 642
- Goals: 2,341 (3.65 per match)

League 3 is run by the Football League under the auspices of the Football League Youth Alliance. 52 teams entered the competition this season, 2 fewer than the previous season. Hereford United U18s were expelled from the league, and Colchester United U18s were promoted back to Category 2 Academy status after going down for one season.

=== League stage ===
Update 27 April 2015

==== North-West Division ====
| Pos | Team | Pld | W | D | L | GF | GA | GD | Pts |
|---|---|---|---|---|---|---|---|---|---|
| 1 | Bury U18s (C) | 30 | 20 | 5 | 5 | 67 | 32 | +35 | 65 |
| 2 | Wigan Athletic U18s | 30 | 19 | 7 | 4 | 70 | 27 | +43 | 64 |
| 3 | Rochdale U18s | 30 | 20 | 3 | 7 | 70 | 41 | +29 | 63 |
| 4 | Tranmere Rovers U18s | 30 | 14 | 8 | 8 | 50 | 46 | +4 | 50 |
| 5 | Walsall U18s | 30 | 14 | 6 | 10 | 41 | 31 | +10 | 48 |
| 6 | Preston North End U18s | 30 | 13 | 8 | 9 | 54 | 31 | +23 | 47 |
| 7 | Oldham Athletic U18s | 30 | 14 | 3 | 13 | 60 | 48 | +12 | 45 |
| 8 | Blackpool U18s | 30 | 13 | 6 | 11 | 47 | 43 | +4 | 45 |
| 9 | Burnley U18s | 30 | 12 | 8 | 10 | 62 | 56 | +6 | 44 |
| 10 | Port Vale U18s | 30 | 13 | 4 | 13 | 52 | 46 | +6 | 43 |
| 11 | Wrexham U18s | 30 | 12 | 5 | 13 | 54 | 56 | −2 | 41 |
| 12 | Shrewsbury Town U18s | 30 | 8 | 8 | 14 | 56 | 60 | −4 | 32 |
| 13 | Carlisle United U18s | 30 | 6 | 10 | 14 | 36 | 64 | −28 | 28 |
| 14 | Accrington Stanley U18s | 30 | 8 | 4 | 18 | 35 | 66 | −31 | 28 |
| 15 | Fleetwood Town U18s | 30 | 8 | 0 | 22 | 24 | 57 | −33 | 24 |
| 16 | Morecambe U18s | 30 | 3 | 1 | 26 | 24 | 98 | −74 | 10 |

(C) Champions

==== North-East Division ====
| Pos | Team | Pld | W | D | L | GF | GA | GD | Pts |
|---|---|---|---|---|---|---|---|---|---|
| 1 | Bradford City U18s (C) | 24 | 17 | 4 | 3 | 61 | 27 | +34 | 55 |
| 2 | Doncaster Rovers U18s | 24 | 14 | 7 | 3 | 57 | 21 | +36 | 49 |
| 3 | Chesterfield U18s | 24 | 14 | 3 | 7 | 48 | 28 | +20 | 45 |
| 4 | Hull City U18s | 24 | 11 | 6 | 7 | 47 | 37 | +10 | 39 |
| 5 | Lincoln City U18s | 24 | 11 | 6 | 7 | 43 | 40 | +3 | 39 |
| 6 | Notts County U18s | 24 | 11 | 4 | 9 | 44 | 35 | +9 | 37 |
| 7 | Grimsby Town U18s | 24 | 11 | 4 | 9 | 39 | 40 | −1 | 37 |
| 8 | Mansfield Town U18s | 24 | 9 | 5 | 10 | 44 | 46 | −2 | 32 |
| 9 | Scunthorpe United U18s | 24 | 7 | 6 | 11 | 33 | 45 | −12 | 27 |
| 10 | Rotherham United U18s | 24 | 7 | 5 | 12 | 35 | 40 | −5 | 26 |
| 11 | Burton Albion U18s | 24 | 5 | 6 | 13 | 39 | 64 | −25 | 21 |
| 12 | Hartlepool United U18s | 24 | 5 | 2 | 17 | 42 | 63 | −21 | 17 |
| 13 | York City U18s | 24 | 3 | 4 | 17 | 22 | 68 | −46 | 13 |

(C) Champions

==== South-West Division ====
| Pos | Team | Pld | W | D | L | GF | GA | GD | Pts |
|---|---|---|---|---|---|---|---|---|---|
| 1 | AFC Bournemouth U18s (C) | 18 | 13 | 3 | 2 | 36 | 19 | +17 | 42 |
| 2 | Plymouth Argyle U18s | 18 | 10 | 4 | 4 | 43 | 27 | +16 | 34 |
| 3 | Swindon Town U18s | 18 | 9 | 3 | 6 | 43 | 34 | +9 | 30 |
| 4 | Portsmouth U18s | 18 | 8 | 4 | 6 | 42 | 32 | +10 | 28 |
| 5 | Exeter City U18s | 18 | 8 | 2 | 8 | 30 | 29 | +1 | 26 |
| 6 | Bristol Rovers U18s | 18 | 6 | 6 | 6 | 29 | 25 | +4 | 24 |
| 7 | Oxford United U18s | 18 | 7 | 1 | 10 | 27 | 32 | −5 | 22 |
| 8 | Cheltenham Town U18s | 18 | 7 | 1 | 10 | 30 | 42 | −12 | 22 |
| 9 | Torquay United U18s | 18 | 3 | 4 | 11 | 25 | 43 | −18 | 13 |
| 10 | Newport County U18s | 18 | 3 | 4 | 11 | 27 | 49 | −22 | 13 |

(C) Champions

==== South-East Division ====
| Pos | Team | Pld | W | D | L | GF | GA | GD | Pts |
|---|---|---|---|---|---|---|---|---|---|
| 1 | Barnet U18s (C) | 24 | 17 | 3 | 4 | 82 | 51 | +31 | 54 |
| 2 | Milton Keynes Dons U18s | 24 | 15 | 3 | 6 | 78 | 52 | +26 | 48 |
| 3 | Peterborough United U18s | 24 | 13 | 5 | 6 | 61 | 40 | +21 | 44 |
| 4 | Luton Town U18s | 24 | 12 | 8 | 4 | 51 | 30 | +21 | 44 |
| 5 | Watford U18s | 24 | 11 | 6 | 7 | 70 | 50 | +20 | 39 |
| 6 | Southend United U18s | 24 | 10 | 7 | 7 | 49 | 45 | +4 | 37 |
| 7 | Stevenage U18s | 24 | 9 | 5 | 10 | 46 | 47 | −1 | 32 |
| 8 | Leyton Orient U18s | 24 | 8 | 6 | 10 | 35 | 42 | −7 | 30 |
| 9 | AFC Wimbledon U18s | 24 | 7 | 6 | 11 | 41 | 47 | −6 | 27 |
| 10 | Northampton Town U18s | 24 | 6 | 9 | 9 | 41 | 51 | −10 | 27 |
| 11 | Cambridge United U18s | 24 | 5 | 4 | 15 | 35 | 58 | −23 | 19 |
| 12 | Gillingham U18s | 24 | 4 | 4 | 16 | 35 | 64 | −29 | 16 |
| 13 | Dagenham & Redbridge U18s | 24 | 4 | 4 | 16 | 29 | 76 | −47 | 16 |

(C) Champions

== See also ==
- 2014–15 Professional U21 Development League
- 2014–15 FA Cup
- 2014–15 FA Youth Cup
- 2014–15 in English football
