= 2016–17 Yeovil Town F.C. season =

Yeovil Town
2016–17 season
- Chairman: John Fry
- Manager: Darren Way
- Stadium: Huish Park
- League Two: 20th
- FA Cup: First round replay
- EFL Cup: Second round
- EFL Trophy: Quarter-final
- Top goalscorer: League: François Zoko (8); All: François Zoko (13)
- Highest home attendance: 6,306 (30 December vs. Portsmouth, League Two)
- Lowest home attendance: 1,081 (10 January vs. Reading U23s, EFL Trophy)
- Average home league attendance: 3,567
Home colours	Away colours

The 2016–17 season was the 14th season in the Football League and the second consecutive season at the fourth tier of English football played by Yeovil Town Football Club, an English football club based in Yeovil, Somerset.

It was manager Darren Way's first full season in charge, and he signed fourteen players on permanent and loan contracts before the close of the summer transfer window. After winning their opening game, Yeovil lost six of their next seven matches leaving them in the relegation zone in September before an improved run of form, including eight matches unbeaten saw the club rise into the play-offs after a 5–0 victory against Crawley Town in December. This though was the highpoint of the season as Yeovil only won three of their final 27 matches as the club slid dangerously towards the relegation zone, but safety was confirmed with one match to spare as Yeovil finished the season in 20th place.

The club were knocked out in the first round of the FA Cup, losing to non-league side Solihull Moors in a replay, while the Glovers progressed to the second round of the EFL Cup losing to Premier League side Everton. The club also reached the quarter-finals of the revamped EFL Trophy, losing to Luton Town. Ivorian striker François Zoko finished as the club's top goalscorer with thirteen goals, with eight of them coming in the league.

== Background ==
The 2015–16 season saw Yeovil compete in the fourth tier of English football following their successive relegations from the Championship and then League One. The season started poorly with the club suffering a series of injury crises and only winning two league matches by the end of November. With a third consecutive relegation a real possibility the club sacked manager Paul Sturrock, and replaced him with first-team coach Darren Way. After his appointment, Yeovil's form improved including a run of four consecutive 1–0 wins in March and eight clean-sheets in nine matches and safety was confirmed with four matches to spare as Yeovil finished the season in 19th place. Yeovil reached the third round of the FA Cup, for the third consecutive season for the first time in the club's history, losing in a penalty shootout to Carlisle United. The club also reached the southern area semi-finals of the Football League Trophy, losing to Oxford United.

The end of the season saw Way release eight players, including Jack Compton, Jordan Gibbons, Simon Gillett, Shaun Jeffers, Marc Laird, Leroy Lita, Jakub Sokolík and Chris Weale, while the club terminated the contracts of Mark Beck and Wes Fogden a year early. Six players were offered new contracts by Darren Way, defender Nathan Smith and Ivorian striker François Zoko agreed new one-year contracts, while goalkeeper Artur Krysiak, Ryan Dickson and Omar Sowunmi all agreed two-year contract extensions. Defensive midfielder Ben Tozer verbally agreed a new contract subject to him passing a medical after recovering from an operation on his knee. but later rejected the offer to sign for Newport County.

== Review ==
=== Pre-season ===
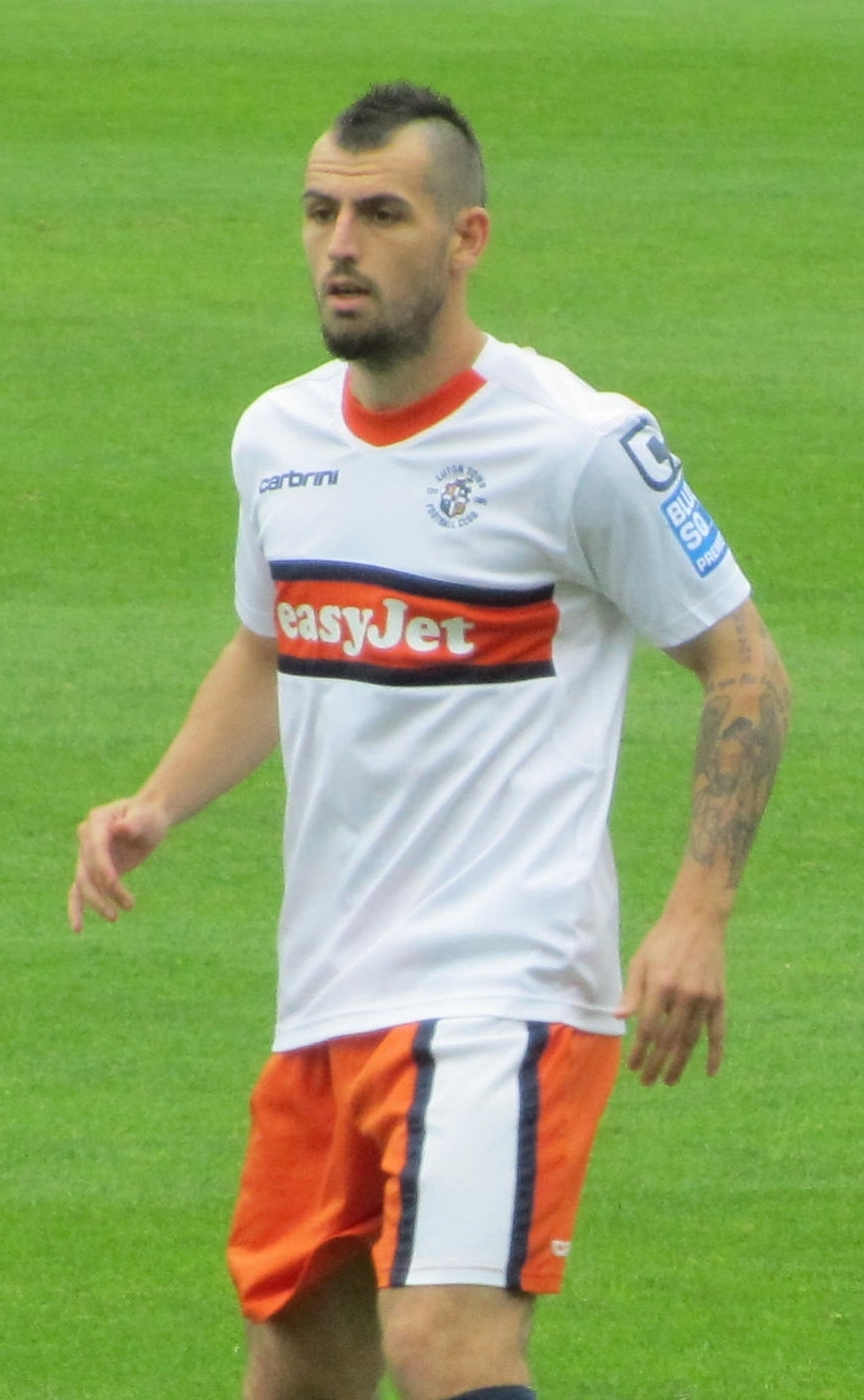
Midfielder Alex Lawless joined following his release from Luton Town.

The squad returned for pre-season training on 1 July. The first day of pre-season saw the arrival of three new signings, attacking midfielder Otis Khan joined from Barnsley on a free transfer signing a one-year contract, forward Tom Eaves also signed for a year having been released from Bolton Wanderers, while defender Liam Shephard rejoined on a six-month loan deal from Swansea City. The following day Yeovil confirmed two further signings, former West Bromwich Albion full-back Josh Ezewele, and midfielder Joe Lea from Southampton both on one-year contracts. On 8 July, Yeovil confirmed the signing of winger Ryan Hedges on a six-month loan deal from Swansea City.

Yeovil's first friendly of the season saw them travel to Southern League Premier side Dorchester Town, on 12 July. Yeovil's squad included eight trialists, and one of those former Norwich City forward Jamar Loza scored the only goal in a 1–0 victory. One of those eight trialists former Leicester City goalkeeper Jonny Maddison became the club's seventh signing, on 14 July, joining on a one-year contract. On 16 July, Yeovil played their second pre-season friendly a home fixture against Championship side Bristol City, and suffered a 2–1 defeat with Tom Eaves scoring Yeovil's goal.

Yeovil then travelled to South Wales for a short training camp, where on 18 July they faced a Merthyr Town side managed by former Yeovil midfielder Gavin Williams. A goal from Swansea loanee Liam Shephard was enough for Yeovil to record a 1–0 win. Yeovil then played two behind closed doors friendly matches against under-21 sides from Swansea City and Tottenham Hotspur. Yeovil then traveled to Salisbury, on 26 July, and welcomed new trialist form Luton Town midfielder Alex Lawless, a brace from Ryan Hedges and another goal from Tom Eaves saw Yeovil run out 3–2 winners. On 29 July, Lawless joined the club signing a one-year contract after a successful trial. Yeovil completed their pre-season schedule with a 2–1 victory over League One side Swindon Town, courtesy of another goal from Eaves and winger Otis Khan. On 1 August, last season's joint top goalscorer Ryan Bird left the club after Yeovil decided to terminate his contract to allow him to join National League side Eastleigh. On 5 August, Yeovil made the loan signings of midfielder Matt Butcher and winger Tahvon Campbell from Bournemouth and West Bromwich Albion respectively, while the club also completed the free transfer of defender Bevis Mugabi from Southampton.

Pre-season match details
Date	Opponents	Venue	Result	Score F–A	Scorers	Attendance	Ref
11 July 2016	Dorchester Town	A	W	1–0	Loza	560	
16 July 2016	Bristol City	H	L	1–2	Eaves	1,677	
18 July 2016	Merthyr Town	A	W	1–0	Shephard		
20 July 2016	Swansea City U23s	A	W	5–0		—	
23 July 2016	Tottenham Hotspur U23s	A	D	1–1	Khan	—	
26 July 2016	Salisbury	A	W	3–2	Hedges (2), Eaves	691	
30 July 2016	Swindon Town	H	W	2–1	Eaves, Khan	888	

=== August ===
Yeovil started their League Two season at home against Notts County, on 6 August. The Glovers started the match well with Kevin Dawson scoring his first goal in almost two years, and winger Otis Khan scoring on his debut to earn Yeovil a 2–0 victory. Yeovil then traveled to League One side Walsall in the first round of the EFL Cup and won 2–0 after extra time, with Matthew Dolan scoring a goal from inside his own half. On 13 August, Yeovil confirmed the signing of former Swansea City youth player Kyle Copp on non-contract terms subject to international clearance, later that day Yeovil drew 1–1 away at Luton Town with Tom Eaves scoring his first goal for the club. On 15 August, young attacking midfielder Ollie Bassett received his first call up to the Northern Ireland under-19 side for a training camp. Yeovil's unbeaten start to the season came to an end, on 16 August, with a 1–0 defeat against Mansfield Town despite their opponents playing with 10-men for 81 minutes.

On 20 August, Yeovil slumped to a second consecutive 1–0 defeat losing at home against Morecambe. Yeovil then traveled to Everton in the second round of the EFL Cup, on 23 August, but were outclassed by their Premier League opponents losing 4–0. On 24 August, Yeovil announced the extension of Ryan Hedges and Liam Shephard's loans from Swansea City until the end of the season, Hedges was also called up for the Wales under-21 side for two 2017 UEFA European Under-21 Championship qualification matches. Later that day the club also confirmed that Kyle Copp had finally received his International clearance and was eligible to play, while defender Bevis Mugabi received his first call up to the Uganda national football team for their friendly against Kenya and their 2017 Africa Cup of Nations qualification match against Comoros, but Mugabi was subsequently withdrawn from the squad with the club citing the short notice of the call-up as the reason for his withdrawal.

On 25 August, Yeovil confirmed the signings of former Notts County striker Izale McLeod until the end of the season and Bournemouth attacking midfielder Ben Whitfield on loan until 3 January. On 27 August, Yeovil suffered a third straight league defeat losing 4–1 against Doncaster Rovers, with Ryan Hedges scoring Yeovil's consolation goal. Yeovil ended August with their first match in the group stage of the EFL Trophy against Portsmouth, a high-scoring affair saw Yeovil win 4–3 with a brace from Tom Eaves and first goals for the club from Izale McLeod and Bevis Mugabi.

=== September ===
Yeovil began the month with a 3–0 home defeat against Blackpool, a defeat which saw the club slip into the relegation zone. On 10 September, despite taking the lead against Hartlepool United through Matt Butcher Yeovil suffered their fifth consecutive league defeat losing 2–1. Youth team graduate Ollie Bassett joined Southern League Premier Division side Dorchester Town on a one-month loan deal, on 13 September, after not having made an appearance in the first month of the season. On 17 September, Yeovil traveled to Leyton Orient and aided by the return from injury of captain Darren Ward ended their losing streak and recorded their first away win of the season courtesy of a goal from top scorer Tom Eaves.

Whilst on loan at Dorchester, Bassett received another call up to the Northern Ireland under-19 squad for their 2017 UEFA European Under-19 Championship qualification matches in early October. On 24 September, former Yeovil manager Gary Johnson returned with his new side Cheltenham Town visiting Huish Park. A fast start saw Yeovil take a 2–0 lead after 16 minutes through goals from Otis Khan and Darren Ward and despite a fightback from Cheltenham further goals from Matthew Dolan and Tom Eaves gave Yeovil a 4–2 victory. Yeovil's final match of September saw them fall to a 1–0 defeat against bottom of the table side Cambridge United.

=== October ===
The start of October saw Yeovil travel to league leaders Plymouth Argyle but suffered a second consecutive defeat losing 4–1 with the Glovers consolation goal from their captain Darren Ward. Yeovil then faced League One side Bristol Rovers in their second round robin match in the EFL Trophy but after having been reduced to ten-men when substitute Kevin Dawson was dismissed for a second bookable offence, Yeovil earned a 0–0 draw before losing 5–3 in a penalty shootout, for an extra bonus point. The following day Yeovil faced Clevedon Town in the first round of the Somerset Premier Cup, but a Yeovil side made up entirely of their youth team scholars lost 1–0. On 8 October, Yeovil recorded their second consecutive home victory with a Ryan Hedges goal enough to see the Glovers record a 1–0 victory over Wycombe Wanderers. Yeovil then followed this up with two more 1–0 victories over Newport County and Crewe Alexandra.

During October, midfielder Joe Lea joined Dorchester Town on a month's loan deal, and was joined by Ollie Bassett who returned to the Dorset club for a second spell. Yeovil ended the month with a 0–0 draw against Grimsby Town, recording a fifth consecutive clean sheet in all competitions. Having overseen an upturn in Yeovil's fortunes in the month of October, with three victories, one draws and a defeat, along with four clean sheets, manager Darren Way was nominated for the EFL League Two Manager of the Month award, but was beaten by eventual winner Keith Curle.

=== November ===
On 4 November, Yeovil's under-18 side defeated Newport County 1–0 in the first round of the FA Youth Cup. The following day Yeovil faced National League side Solihull Moors in the FA Cup first round. Despite taking a 2–0 lead with goals from Ryan Hedges and Otis Khan, after the sending off of midfielder Kevin Dawson, Solihull fought back to earn a replay. Yeovil then traveled to the Madejski Stadium for their final group stage game in the EFL Trophy to play Reading U23s, second half goals from substitutes Tom Eaves and François Zoko secured qualification to the second round of the competition.

On 10 November, the club confirmed that striker Izale McLeod has agreed to the mutual termination of his contract on personal grounds having only made six appearances for the club since signing in August. Yeovil then traveled to Stevenage, on 12 November, after taking the lead through Ryan Hedges, Yeovil needed a 95th-minute equaliser from Ben Whitfield to rescue a point and earn a 2–2 draw. On 14 November, Yeovil's under-18 progressed to the third round of the FA Youth Cup after beating Merstham 2–0 in the second round. The following day Yeovil were knocked out of the FA Cup after losing 4–2 on penalties to Solihull Moors in their first round replay, after a 1–1 draw in extra time. On 17 November, Yeovil announced that young midfielder Joe Lea had extended his loan at Dorchester Town for a second month. On 19 November, Yeovil came from behind to beat Colchester United with late goals from substitutes François Zoko and Tahvon Campbell enough to earn a 2–1 victory. Yeovil's next match against Crawley Town was postponed due to a waterlogged pitch,

Yeovil then traveled to Accrington Stanley, on 26 November, where an Otis Khan free kick helped extend Yeovil's unbeaten run in the league to seven matches after a 1–1 draw in Lancashire. On 29 November, the club confirmed that Ollie Bassett has also extended his loan at Dorchester Town for another month.

=== December ===
Yeovil started December with the rearranged visit of Crawley Town, and earned their second biggest victory since the club entered the Football League in 2003. A brace from Otis Khan was accompanied by goals from Tom Eaves, Ryan Hedges and François Zoko as Yeovil won 5–0 to move into the play-off positions. On 6 December, Yeovil faced League One side Milton Keynes Dons in the second round of the EFL Trophy, after being 1–0 behind at half time, four unanswered second half goals from Kevin Dawson, François Zoko, Alex Lacey and Ben Whitfield saw Yeovil qualify for the third round of the competition. The same evening Yeovil's under-18 side knocked out Premier League academy side West Bromwich Albion, 3–2 away at The Hawthorns in the third round of the FA Youth Cup. On 10 December, Yeovil's eight game unbeaten run in League Two came to an end after a 1–0 defeat at home to Barnet, the Glovers then traveled to promotion chasing Carlisle United, on 17 December, only to lose 2–1 with Nathan Smith scoring Yeovil's goal.

The Christmas period saw Yeovil record a pair of goalless draws at home to Exeter City and Portsmouth respectively, with the Portsmouth game badly affected by fog. During the Exeter City match Swansea City loanee Ryan Hedges suffered a serious ankle injury which saw him make a temporary return to his parent club for treatment.

=== January ===
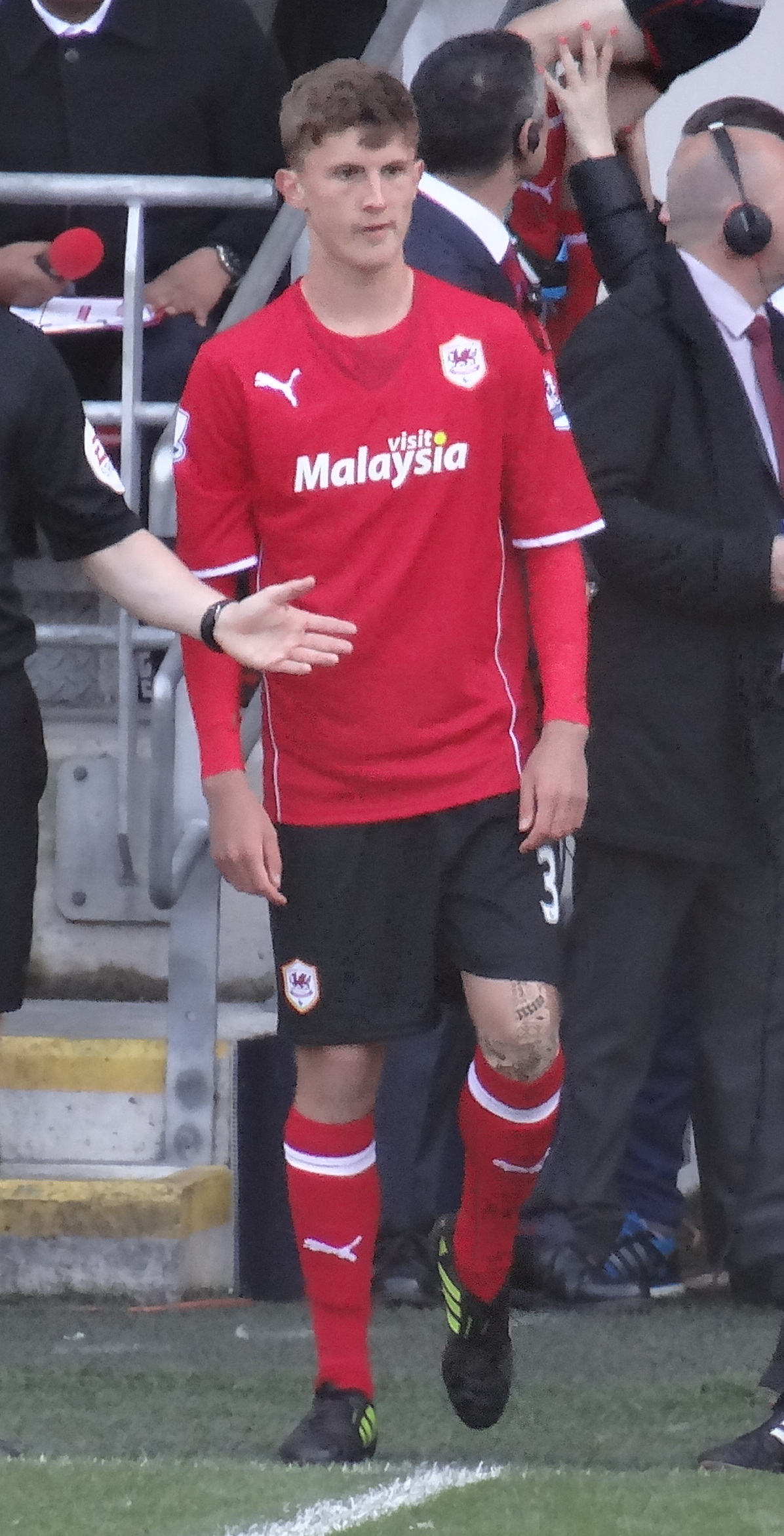
Young defender Tom James signed following his release from Cardiff City.

The opening of the January transfer window, saw Yeovil confirm the signing Birmingham City forward Jack Storer on loan until the end of the season, while midfielder Kyle Copp departed for Southern Premier League side Merthyr Town after only making one appearance for the club. On 2 January, Yeovil's first fixture of the new year saw them travel to Crawley Town where they suffered a 2–0 defeat. After the game the club announced that Bournemouth loanees Matt Butcher and Ben Whitfield had extended their loans until the end of the 2016–17 season, while forward Tahvon Campbell returned to West Brom upon the completion his loan. On 9 January, young right-back joined National League side Kidderminster Harriers on a one-month loan deal. The following day Yeovil faced Reading U23s in the third round of the EFL Trophy. The Berkshire side was reduced to ten men inside the opening 20 minutes, allowing Yeovil to run out comfortable 4–2 winners, with goals from Otis Khan, François Zoko, Omar Sowunmi and an own goal from Jake Sheppard sending the Glovers into the quarterfinals.

On 13 January, Yeovil confirmed the signings of defender Tom James and forward Brandon Goodship on contracts until the end of the season following their release from Cardiff City and Bournemouth respectively. Yeovil then traveled to fifth placed Wycombe Wanderers and took the lead through a Kevin Dawson penalty but Wycombe equalised through a penalty of their own, as the two clubs shared a 1–1 draw. On 17 January, Yeovil announced the loan signing of Andre Wright from West Bromwich Albion until the end of the season, but the following day the loan deal collapsed after it was revealed that Wright's appearance for West Brom's U23 in the EFL Trophy in August counted as a first team appearance and therefore this meant that Wright had already appeared for two clubs during the 2016–17 season and so could not be registered for a third. It was also announced that youth team scholar Callum Morton had signed for West Bromwich Albion, and that academy manager Geoff Harrop would be leaving the club at the end of January to rejoin former club Torquay United as general manager.

After the failed transfer of Wright, Yeovil moved to sign young Tottenham Hotspur striker Shayon Harrison on loan until the end of the season. On 21 January, Yeovil traveled to Blackpool. The Glovers took the lead twice through François Zoko and Darren Ward but they conceded a 95th-minute equaliser through Nathan Delfouneso as Yeovil were held to a 2–2 draw. The following day, young midfielder Joe Lea was sent out on loan to National League South side Gosport Borough until the end of the season. On 24 January, Yeovil's EFL Trophy quarter-final against Luton Town was postponed due to a frozen pitch, while Jack Storer's loan from Birmingham was terminated for personal reasons after having only made one appearance for Yeovil. On 28 January, Yeovil faced league leaders Doncaster Rovers and lost 3–0. Transfer deadline day saw Yeovil lose Swansea City loanee Ryan Hedges to Barnsley, but the completed three loan signings Owain Jones from Swansea City, French forward Jean-Louis Akpa Akpro from Barnet, and young striker Kabongo Tshimanga from Milton Keynes Dons until the end of the season.

Deadline day also saw Yeovil face promotion chasing Plymouth Argyle, two goals from centre-backs Nathan Smith and Alex Lacey were enough to earn the Glovers a 2–1 victory. After the Plymouth Argyle match, the club announced that former first team manager Steve Rutter had rejoined the club as head of coaching in the Glovers' academy.

=== February ===
On 3 February, youth team goalkeeper Kingsley Latham became the second scholar to depart the club for a Premier League side, joining Southampton. The following day, the club traveled to Hartlepool United and secured a 1–1 draw courtesy of a Matthew Dolan penalty against his hometown club. Yeovil then faced Luton Town in the quarter-finals of the EFL Trophy, but despite goals from François Zoko and Omar Sowunmi, the Glovers were knocked out after suffering a 5–2 defeat. On 11 February, Yeovil faced relegation-threatened Leyton Orient after taking the lead through François Zoko, the club were denied victory after a late equaliser from former Yeovil player Gavin Massey.

After completing his month loan spell at Kidderminster Harriers right-back Josh Ezewele joined the National League North side permanently on a free transfer. On 14 February, Yeovil faced Cambridge United and despite once again taking the lead through François Zoko a late equaliser forced them to settle for a second consecutive 1–1 draw. Yeovil then traveled to former manager Gary Johnson's side Cheltenham Town and suffered a 2–0 defeat. The club then ended February with consecutive goalless draws away at Notts County and at home against Mansfield Town respectively.

=== March ===
March began with Yeovil's academy head of youth recruitment Dave Hedges departing the club following Geoff Harrop to Torquay United. On 4 March, Yeovil lost their opening game of the month 4–0 at home against promotion chasing Luton Town. The start of March, also saw the return of young attacking midfielder Ollie Bassett from his loan spell at Dorchester Town.

After eight matches without a win, Yeovil traveled to Morecambe and recorded a 3–1 win with goals from Matt Butcher, Alex Lacey and Bevis Mugabi as Yeovil won their first away game since October. On 12 March, the club announced the death of post-war record goalscorer Dave Taylor at the age of 76. Yeovil then faced Barnet, on 15 March, and took an early lead through Ben Whitfield but were forced to salvage a late 2–2 draw courtesy of Liam Shephard's first goal for the club. On 18 March, Yeovil faced Accrington Stanley but were held to a 1–1 draw despite the visitors playing almost 70 minutes with 10 men.

Yeovil ended the month with the short trip to West County rivals Exeter City, and took a 3–0 lead with goals from François Zoko, Shayon Harrison and Alex Lacey, but three goals in 238 seconds saw Exeter complete a remarkable comeback to secure a 3–3 draw.

=== April and May ===
Yeovil opened the month of April with a 2–0 defeat at home against Carlisle United, as their opponents ended a seven-game winless run without scoring, after midfielder Ben Whitfield was shown a straight red card. The Glovers suffered two further defeats 3–1 away at promotion chasing Portsmouth, and 1–0 away at relegation threatened Newport County. On 17 April, Yeovil eased their relegation fears with a comfortable 3–0 win, their first in seven games, against Crewe Alexandra with goals from Matthew Dolan, Jean-Louis Akpa Akpro and Otis Khan.

The club's poor away form continued though as they suffered a 4–2 defeat away at Grimsby Town, on 22 April, despite a first goal for the club from Alex Lawless and a thirteenth of the season from top goalscorer François Zoko. Yeovil's final home match of the season, saw them entertain Stevenage, the Glovers took the lead with Akpa Akpro scoring his second goal for the club but Josh McQuoid earned play-off chasing Stevenage a point as Yeovil confirmed safety with a game to spare. The club's end of season awards, followed the conclusion of the match with defender Alex Lacey collecting two awards, Artur Krysiak and Matthew Dolan won one award each and Otis Khan won the Bobby Hamilton Young Player of the Year award, while Krysiak also collected the Community Champion award. Yeovil ended the season with a 2–0 defeat away at Colchester United to finish the season in 20th place.

== Summary and aftermath ==
After a strong start to the season Yeovil struggled in the second half of the season with only 3 wins in their final 27 league games, as the club slid from the play-off positions to finish in 20th position. In the league the team won 8 matches, drew 8 and lost 7 at home, compared to winning 3, drawing 9 and losing 11 away from home. The club's 49 league goals was the joint second fewest in League Two. Tom Eaves recorded the highest number of appearances during the season, appearing in 48 of Yeovil's 56 matches. François Zoko finished as the club's top goalscorer with 13 goals, with 8 of those coming in the league.

The end of the season saw manager Darren Way release six players, Ollie Bassett, Tom Eaves, Brandon Goodship, Alex Lawless, Joe Lea and captain Darren Ward. While the club offered new contracts to nine out of contract players. Midfielder Kevin Dawson rejected the offer of a new contract to sign for fellow League Two side Cheltenham Town and reunite with former manager Gary Johnson, while Nathan Smith and François Zoko quickly agreed new one-year and two-year contracts respectively, while winger Otis Khan, defenders Bevis Mugabi, Tom James and keeper Jonny Maddison also agreed new two-year contracts. Defender Alex Lacey rejected the club's offer of a new two-year contract and signed for League One side Gillingham. Meanwhile, midfielder Matthew Dolan rejected the club's offer to sign for fellow League Two side Newport County.

== Club ==
The club's management team and backroom staff remained largely the same as the end of the 2015–16 season, with manager Darren Way having signed a new three-year contract in April 2016, with assistant Terry Skiverton and physio Mike Micciche stayed in their current roles. While player-goalkeeper coach Chris Weale was released at the end of the season, having rejected Way's offer of a new contract solely as a goalkeeper coach and was replaced by academy goalkeeping coach Sam Shulberg. The end of the season also saw the departure of head of youth David Byrne after a year in the role.

A new home kit was once again introduced, having been chosen by the fans in October 2015, the new kit featured green and white hoops with black sleeves. While the away kit was maintained for a second season. The kits continued to feature Jones Building Group as the main sponsor who extended their contract until 2019, and Thatchers Cider as rear shirt sponsor.

=== Coaching staff ===
Position	Staff
Manager	Darren Way
Assistant manager	Terry Skiverton
Goalkeeping coach	Sam Shulberg
Physio	Mike Micciche
Football Operations Assistant	Giannis Iousif

=== Kit ===
Supplier: Sondico
Sponsor(s): Jones Building Group

Home	Away

== Transfers ==
=== In ===
Date	Name	From	Fee	Ref
1 July 2016	Tom Eaves	Bolton Wanderers	Free (released)	
1 July 2016	Otis Khan	Barnsley	Free	
2 July 2016	Josh Ezewele	West Bromwich Albion	Free (released)	
2 July 2016	Joe Lea	Southampton	Free (released)	
14 July 2016	Jonny Maddison	Leicester City	Free (released)	
29 July 2016	Alex Lawless	Luton Town	Free (released)	
5 August 2016	Bevis Mugabi	Southampton	Free	
13 August 2016	Kyle Copp	Swansea City	Free (released)	
25 August 2016	Izale McLeod	Notts County	Free (released)	
13 January 2017	Tom James	Cardiff City	Free (released)	
13 January 2017	Brandon Goodship	Bournemouth	Free (released)	

=== Out ===
Date	Name	To	Fee	Ref
1 August 2016	Ryan Bird	Eastleigh	Contract terminated by mutual consent	
10 November 2016	Izale McLeod	Corby Town	Contract terminated by mutual consent	
1 January 2017	Kyle Copp	Merthyr Town	Contract terminated by mutual consent	
17 January 2017	Callum Morton	West Bromwich Albion	Undisclosed	
3 February 2017	Kingsley Latham	Southampton	Undisclosed	
13 February 2017	Josh Ezewele	Kidderminster Harriers	Free	
30 June 2017	Kevin Dawson	Cheltenham Town	Rejected new contract	
30 June 2017	Matthew Dolan	Newport County	Rejected new contract	
30 June 2017	Alex Lacey	Gillingham	Rejected new contract	
30 June 2017	Ollie Bassett	Coalville Town	Released	
30 June 2017	Tom Eaves	Gillingham	Released	
30 June 2017	Brandon Goodship	Weymouth	Released	
30 June 2017	Alex Lawless	Leyton Orient	Released	
30 June 2017	Joe Lea	Bognor Regis Town	Released	
30 June 2017	Darren Ward	Hemel Hempstead Town	Released	

=== Loan in ===
Date	Name	From	End date	Ref
1 July 2016	Liam Shephard	Swansea City	7 May 2017	
8 July 2016	Ryan Hedges	Swansea City	31 January 2017	
5 August 2016	Matt Butcher	Bournemouth	7 May 2017	
5 August 2016	Tahvon Campbell	West Bromwich Albion	3 January 2017	
25 August 2016	Ben Whitfield	Bournemouth	7 May 2017	
1 January 2017	Jack Storer	Birmingham City	25 January 2017	
20 January 2017	Shayon Harrison	Tottenham Hotspur	7 May 2017	
31 January 2017	Kabongo Tshimanga	Milton Keynes Dons	7 May 2017	
31 January 2017	Jean-Louis Akpa Akpro	Barnet	7 May 2017	
31 January 2017	Owain Jones	Swansea City	7 May 2017	

=== Loan out ===
Date	Name	To	End date	Ref
13 September 2016	Ollie Bassett	Dorchester Town	15 October 2016	
14 October 2016	Joe Lea	Dorchester Town	17 December 2016	
28 October 2016	Ollie Bassett	Dorchester Town	29 December 2016	
9 January 2017	Josh Ezewele	Kidderminster Harriers	12 February 2017	
22 January 2017	Joe Lea	Gosport Borough	30 April 2017	
3 February 2017	Ollie Bassett	Dorchester Town	4 March 2017	

== Match details ==
=== League Two ===
League Two match details
Date	League position	Opponents	Venue	Result	Score F–A	Scorers	Attendance	Ref
6 August 2016	4th	Notts County	H	W	2–0	Dawson, Khan	3,715	
13 August 2016	4th	Luton Town	A	D	1–1	Eaves	7,800	
16 August 2016	12th	Mansfield Town	A	L	0–1		2,503	
20 August 2016	16th	Morecambe	H	L	0–1		2,937	
27 August 2016	21st	Doncaster Rovers	A	L	1–4	Hedges	4,686	
3 September 2016	23rd	Blackpool	H	L	0–3		3,108	
10 September 2016	23rd	Hartlepool United	H	L	1–2	Butcher	2,749	
17 September 2016	21st	Leyton Orient	A	W	1–0	Eaves	4,557	
24 September 2016	19th	Cheltenham Town	H	W	4–2	Khan, Ward, Dolan, Eaves	3,448	
27 September 2016	20th	Cambridge United	A	L	0–1		3,556	
1 October 2016	21st	Plymouth Argyle	A	L	1–4	Ward	8,529	
8 October 2016	18th	Wycombe Wanderers	H	W	1–0	Hedges	3,187	
15 October 2016	15th	Newport County	H	W	1–0	Butler (og)	3,353	
22 October 2016	13th	Crewe Alexandra	A	W	1–0	Dolan	3,659	
29 October 2016	11th	Grimsby Town	H	D	0–0		3,733	
12 November 2016	10th	Stevenage	A	D	2–2	Hedges, Whitfield	2,457	
19 November 2016	8th	Colchester United	H	W	2–1	Zoko, Campbell	2,985	
26 November 2016	13th	Accrington Stanley	A	D	1–1	Khan	1,263	
3 December 2016	6th	Crawley Town	H	W	5–0	Eaves, Hedges, Khan (2), Zoko	2,817	
10 December 2016	10th	Barnet	H	L	0–1		3,254	
17 December 2016	12th	Carlisle United	A	L	1–2	Smith	4,646	
26 December 2016	13th	Exeter City	H	D	0–0		6,086	
31 December 2016	12th	Portsmouth	H	D	0–0		6,306	
2 January 2017	14th	Crawley Town	A	L	0–2		2,304	
14 January 2017	16th	Wycombe Wanderers	A	D	1–1	Dawson (pen)	3,493	
21 January 2017	16th	Blackpool	A	D	2–2	Zoko, Ward	2,885	
28 January 2017	16th	Doncaster Rovers	H	L	0–3		3,627	
31 January 2017	15th	Plymouth Argyle	H	W	2–1	Smith, Lacey	4,788	
4 February 2017	15th	Hartlepool United	A	D	1–1	Dolan (pen)	3,410	
11 February 2017	16th	Leyton Orient	H	D	1–1	Zoko	3,120	
14 February 2017	16th	Cambridge United	H	D	1–1	Zoko	2,847	
18 February 2017	17th	Cheltenham Town	A	L	0–2		3,347	
25 February 2017	17th	Notts County	A	D	0–0		7,141	
28 February 2017	17th	Mansfield Town	H	D	0–0		2,766	
4 March 2017	17th	Luton Town	H	L	0–4		4,194	
11 March 2017	17th	Morecambe	A	W	3–1	Butcher, Lacey, Mugabi	1,433	
15 March 2017	17th	Barnet	A	D	2–2	Whitfield, Shephard	1,525	
18 March 2017	17th	Accrington Stanley	H	D	1–1	Zoko	2,991	
25 March 2017	18th	Exeter City	A	D	3–3	Zoko, Harrison, Lacey	5,492	
1 April 2017	19th	Carlisle United	H	L	0–2		3,145	
8 April 2017	20th	Portsmouth	A	L	1–3	Stevens (og)	17,564	
14 April 2017	20th	Newport County	A	L	0–1		3,789	
17 April 2017	18th	Crewe Alexandra	H	W	3–0	Dolan, Akpa Akpro, Khan	3,167	
22 April 2017	20th	Grimsby Town	A	L	2–4	Lawless, Zoko	4,061	
29 April 2017	19th	Stevenage	H	D	1–1	Akpa Akpro	3,716	
6 May 2017	20th	Colchester United	A	L	0–2		6,565	

==== League table ====
Pos	Team	Pld	W	D	L	GF	GA	GD	Pts
18	Morecambe	46	14	10	22	53	73	−20	52
19	Crawley Town	46	13	12	21	53	71	−18	51
20	Yeovil Town	46	11	17	18	49	64	−15	50
21	Cheltenham Town	46	12	14	20	49	69	−20	50
22	Newport County	46	12	12	22	51	73	−22	48

Updated to match(es) played on 6 May 2017. Source: BBC Sport
Rules for classification: 1) Points; 2) Goal difference; 3) Number of goals scored

=== FA Cup ===
FA Cup match details
Round	Date	Opponents	Venue	Result	Score F–A	Scorers	Attendance	Ref
First round	5 November 2016	Solihull Moors	H	D	2–2	Hedges, Khan	2,118	
First round replay	15 November 2016	Solihull Moors	A	D	1–1^{[A]}	Zoko	1,460	

=== EFL Cup ===
EFL Cup match details
Round	Date	Opponents	Venue	Result	Score F–A	Scorers	Attendance	Ref
First round	9 August 2016	Walsall	A	W	2–0^{[B]}	Bakayoko (og), Dolan	2,699	
Second round	23 August 2016	Everton	A	L	0–4		24,617	

=== EFL Trophy ===
EFL Trophy match details
Round	Date	Opponents	Venue	Result	Score F–A	Scorers	Attendance	Ref
Southern Group A	30 August 2016	Portsmouth	H	W	4–3	Mugabi, Eaves (2), McLeod	1,534	
Southern Group A	4 October 2016	Bristol Rovers	A	D	0–0^{[C]}		2,117	
Southern Group A	9 November 2016	Reading U23s	A	W	2–0	Eaves, Zoko	739	
Second round	6 December 2016	Milton Keynes Dons	H	W	4–1	Dawson (pen), Zoko (pen), Lacey, Whitfield	1,308	
Third round	10 January 2017	Reading U23s	H	W	4–2	Khan, Zoko, Sowunmi, Sheppard (og)	1,081	
Quarter-final	7 February 2017	Luton Town	A	L	2–5	Zoko, Sowunmi	2,480	

==== Group table ====
Pos	Div	Team	Pld	W	PW	PL	L	GF	GA	GD	Pts	Qualification
1	L2	Yeovil Town	3	2	0	1	0	6	3	+3	7	Advance to Round 2
2	ACA	Reading U21	3	1	1	0	1	5	6	−1	5	Advance to Round 2
3	L2	Portsmouth	3	1	0	1	1	6	6	0	4	
4	L1	Bristol Rovers	3	0	1	0	2	2	4	−2	2	

Source: Sky Sports

== Squad statistics ==
Numbers in parentheses denote appearances as substitute.
Players with squad numbers struck through and marked † left the club during the playing season.
Players with names in italics and marked * were on loan from another club for the whole of their season with Yeovil.
Players listed with no appearances have been in the matchday squad but only as unused substitutes.
Key to positions: GK – Goalkeeper; DF – Defender; MF – Midfielder; FW – Forward

No.	Pos.	Nat.	Name	Apps	Goals	Apps	Goals	Apps	Goals	Apps	Goals	Apps	Goals	Yellow card	Red card
No.	Pos.	Nat.	Name	League		FA Cup		EFL Cup		EFL Trophy		Total		Discipline	
1	GK	POL	Artur Krysiak	41	0	2	0	2	0	0	0	47	0	3	0
2	DF	WAL	Liam Shephard *	38	1	2	0	2	0	4	0	46	1	8	0
3	DF	JAM	Nathan Smith	33 (1)	2	1	0	1	0	6	0	41 (1)	2	7	0
4	MF	ENG	Matthew Dolan	38	4	2	0	2	1	5	0	47	5	6	0
5	DF	ENG	Bevis Mugabi	20 (11)	1	0 (1)	0	1 (1)	0	4 (1)	1	25 (14)	2	6	1
6	DF	ENG	Alex Lacey	38 (2)	3	2	0	1	0	4	1	45 (2)	4	3	0
7	MF	IRL	Kevin Dawson	39	2	2	0	2	0	3 (1)	1	46 (1)	3	16	2
8	MF	WAL	Alex Lawless	30 (3)	1	0	0	2	0	3 (1)	0	35 (4)	1	9	0
9	FW	ENG	Tom Eaves	30 (10)	4	2	0	2	0	2 (2)	3	36 (12)	7	6	0
10	MF	ENG	Otis Khan	27 (2)	6	2	1	2	0	4 (1)	1	35 (3)	8	3	0
11	DF	ENG	Ryan Dickson	34	0	1	0	1	0	4	0	40	0	3	0
12	GK	ENG	Jonny Maddison	5	0	0	0	0	0	6	0	11	0	1	0
13	FW	CIV	François Zoko	22 (12)	8	0 (2)	1	0	0	3 (1)	4	25 (15)	13	4	0
~~14~~ †	DF	ENG	Josh Ezewele	0	0	0	0	0	0	0 (1)	0	0 (1)	0	0	0
14	DF	ENG	Joe Tomlinson	0	0	0	0	0	0	0	0	0	0	0	0
~~15~~ †	MF	WAL	Kyle Copp	0	0	0	0	0	0	0 (1)	0	0 (1)	0	0	0
16	MF	ENG	Matt Butcher *	27 (7)	2	0 (1)	0	2	0	4 (1)	0	33 (9)	2	9	0
17	FW	ENG	Omar Sowunmi	4 (7)	0	0	0	0 (1)	0	0 (2)	2	4 (10)	2	2	0
~~18~~ †	FW	ENG	Izale McLeod	2 (2)	0	0	0	0	0	1 (1)	1	3 (3)	1	0	0
~~18~~ †	FW	ENG	Jack Storer *	1	0	0	0	0	0	0	0	1	0	0	0
~~19~~ †	FW	ENG	Tahvon Campbell *	6 (13)	1	0	0	0 (2)	0	3	0	9 (15)	1	2	0
19	FW	ENG	Brandon Goodship	1 (7)	0	0	0	0	0	0 (1)	0	1 (8)	0	0	0
20	MF	ENG	Joe Lea	0	0	0	0	0 (1)	0	0 (1)	0	0 (2)	0	0	0
22	MF	NIR	Ollie Bassett	0	0	0	0	0	0	0	0	0	0	0	0
~~23~~ †	MF	WAL	Ryan Hedges *	20 (1)	4	2	1	2	0	3	0	27 (1)	5	2	0
24	FW	WAL	Owain Jones *	0 (2)	0	0	0	0	0	0	0	0 (2)	0	0	0
26	DF	ENG	Darren Ward	14 (2)	3	2	0	0	0	0	0	16 (2)	3	1	0
28	MF	ENG	Ben Whitfield *	22 (12)	2	2	0	0	0	6	1	30 (12)	3	0	1
31	FW	FRA	Jean-Louis Akpa Akpro *	9 (4)	2	0	0	0	0	0	0	9 (4)	2	1	0
32	DF	WAL	Tom James	1 (1)	0	0	0	0	0	0 (1)	0	1 (2)	0	0	0
39	FW	ENG	Shayon Harrison *	4 (10)	1	0	0	0	0	1	0	5 (10)	1	0	0

Players not included in matchday squads
No.	Pos.	Nat.	Name
38	FW	COD	Kabongo Tshimanga *

=== Suspensions ===
Player	Date Received	Offence	Length of suspension	
Bevis Mugabi	(yellow card) (yellow-red card) v Doncaster Rovers, 27 August	Second bookable offence	1 match	Blackpool (H), League Two
Kevin Dawson	(yellow card) v Leyton Orient, 17 September	Five cautions	1 match	Cheltenham Town (H), League Two
Kevin Dawson	(yellow card) (yellow-red card) v Bristol Rovers, 4 October	Second bookable offence	1 match	Reading U23s (A), EFL Trophy
Kevin Dawson	(yellow card) (yellow-red card) v Solihull Moors, 5 November	Second bookable offence	1 match	Stevenage (A), League Two
Bevis Mugabi	(yellow card) v Reading U23, 9 November	Two cautions	1 match	Milton Keynes Dons (H), EFL Trophy
Nathan Smith	(yellow card) v Stevenage, 12 November	Five cautions	1 match	Solihull Moors (A), FA Cup
Matt Butcher	(yellow card) v Colchester United, 19 November	Five cautions	1 match	Accrington Stanley (A), League Two
Alex Lawless	(yellow card) v Reading U23, 10 January	Two cautions	1 match	Luton Town (A), EFL Trophy
Liam Shephard	(yellow card) v Reading U23, 10 January	Two cautions	1 match	Luton Town (A), EFL Trophy
Kevin Dawson	(yellow card) v Plymouth Argyle, 31 January	Ten cautions	2 matches	Hartlepool United (A), Leyton Orient (H), League Two
Omar Sowunmi	(yellow card) v Luton Town, 7 February	Two cautions	1 match	2017–18 EFL Trophy first round
Ben Whitfield	(red card) v Carlisle United, 1 April	Violent conduct	3 matches	Portsmouth (A), Newport County (A), Crewe Alexandra (H), League Two

== Footnotes ==
A. Solihull Moors won 4–2 in a penalty shootout following a 1–1 draw after extra time.
B. Yeovil Town won 2–0 after extra time.
C. Bristol Rovers won 5–3 in a penalty shootout following a 0–0 draw in normal time.

== See also ==
- 2016–17 in English football
- List of Yeovil Town F.C. seasons
