= Stuart Ritchie =

Stuart Ritchie may refer to:

- Stuart J. Ritchie, Scottish psychologist and science communicator
- Stuart Ritchie (footballer), English footballer and football manager
- Stuart Ritchie (soccer), American soccer player
