= Jack Storer =

English footballer (born 1998)

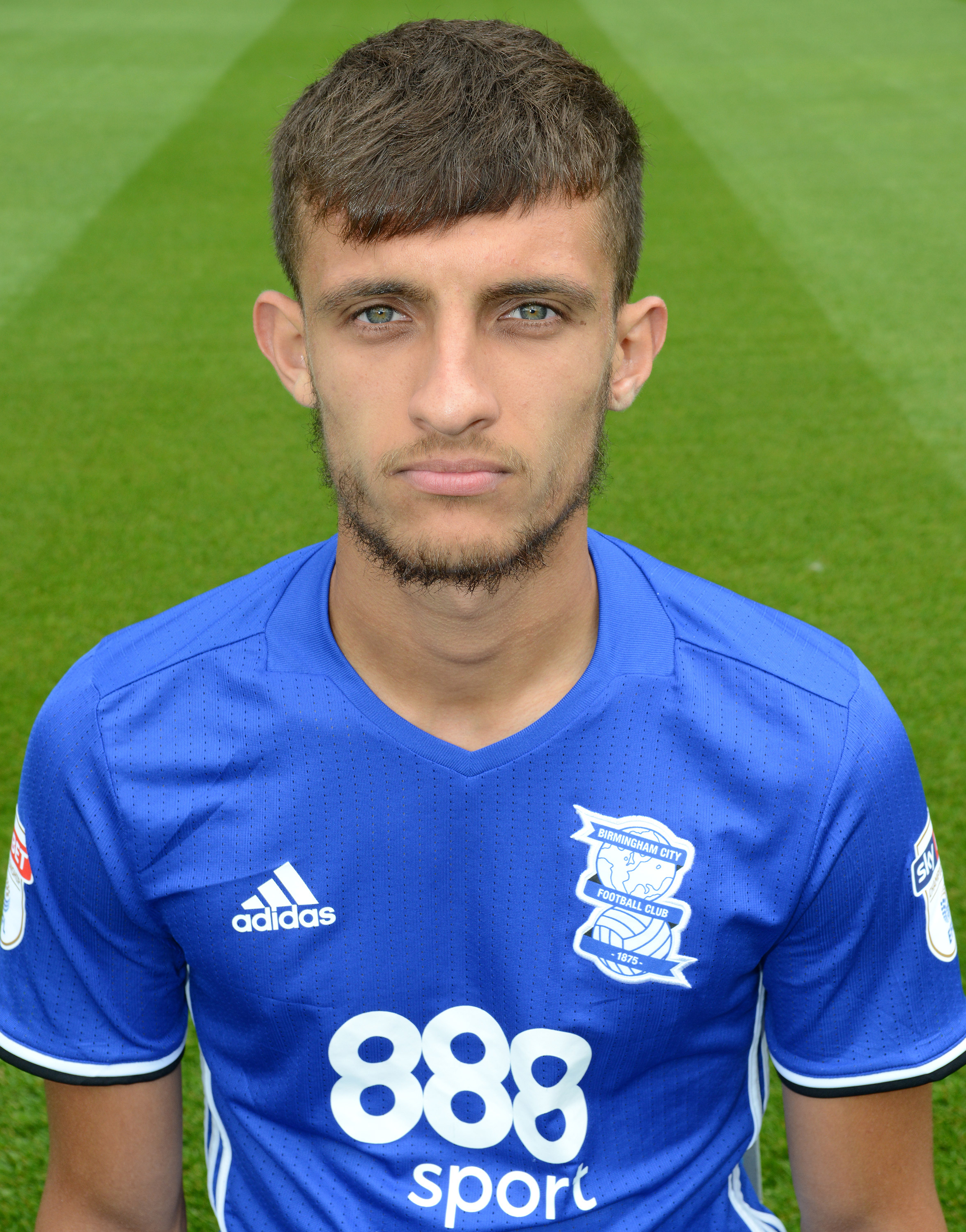
- Storer with Birmingham City in 2016

Personal information
- Full name: Jack Storer
- Date of birth: 2 January 1998 (age 28)
- Place of birth: Birmingham, England
- Height: 6 ft 1 in (1.85 m)
- Position: Forward

Team information
- Current team: Stratford Town

Youth career
- 20??–2012: Birmingham City
- 20??–2013: Shirley Town
- 2013–2014: Wolverhampton Wanderers
- 2014: Paget Rangers
- 2014–2015: Stevenage

Senior career*
Years	Team	Apps	(Gls)
2015–2016	Stevenage	1	(0)
2016–2018	Birmingham City	4	(0)
2017	→ Yeovil Town (loan)	1	(0)
2017	→ Gloucester City (loan)	7	(1)
2017–2018	→ Solihull Moors (loan)	2	(0)
2018	Partick Thistle	4	(0)
2018–2019	Redditch United	2	(0)
2019–2020	Mickleover Sports	6	(1)
2020	Leamington	4	(0)
2020	AFC Telford United	1	(0)
2020	Redditch United	1	(0)
2020	Gresley Rovers	3	(0)
2021	Highgate United	6	(1)
2021	Stourport Swifts	1	(1)
2021–2022	Stratford Town	29	(8)
2022	Highgate United	1	(0)
2023	Bruno's Magpies	8	(5)
2023–2024	Stratford Town	25	(5)
2024	FCB Magpies	2	(1)
2024–2025	Stratford Town	18	(1)
2025	Sutton Coldfield Town	6	(0)
2026	Leamington		
2026	Stratford Town		
2026-	Barwell		
- * Club domestic league appearances and goals as of 23:20, 23 August 2024 (UTC)

Jack Frederick Wendell Storer (born 2 January 1998) is an English footballer who plays for Barwell FC. He previously played for Stevenage, for whom he made his debut in the Football League, Birmingham City, and on loan to Yeovil Town, Gloucester City, Solihull Moors, Partick Thistle and Redditch United.

== Life and career ==
=== Early life and career ===
Storer was born in Birmingham and attended Baverstock School in the Druids Heath area. He was a member of Birmingham City's youth academy until the under-15 level, and played youth football for Shirley Town before joining Wolverhampton Wanderers' academy in early 2013 after a trial. He was not offered a scholarship by Wolves, and briefly played junior football for Paget Rangers – becoming the club's youngest ever first-team player and youngest goalscorer – before linking up with Stevenage, with whom he agreed a scholarship to begin in July 2014 after he left school. In his first year, he was twice named among the substitutes for League Two matches, but remained unused. He made his debut in the Football League on 18 August 2015, aged 17 years 229 days, replacing Tom Pett in the 79th minute of a 3–0 defeat away to Leyton Orient. He signed a professional contract with the club a couple of weeks later.

=== Birmingham City ===
Storer signed a six-month contract with Birmingham City of the Championship in April 2016, to begin on 9 May when the transfer window opened. The fee was undisclosed by Birmingham, while Stevenage reported it as "a five-figure fee ... with further performance payments based on success". After scoring seven goals in pre-season friendlies, four of which came in first-team matches, his contract was extended to 2018. They also earned him a place on the bench for the opening fixture, at home to Cardiff City. He made his debut after 70 minutes, replacing Diego Fabbrini, and came close to giving Birmingham a lead when he narrowly failed to touch Reece Brown's cutback past the goalkeeper; the match finished goalless.

His second league appearance was again as a second-half substitute, with his side losing 2–1 at home to Wolverhampton Wanderers. After seven minutes on the field, he won a free kick in an attacking area; he and opponent Kortney Hause confronted each other, and Storer was sent off for headbutting Hause. Birmingham lost 3–1. When leaving the field, Storer kicked the advertising hoardings, suffering a foot injury that kept him out for longer than the three-match ban. With Clayton Donaldson injured, Storer returned to the bench for the visit to Queens Park Rangers on 24 September, made a brief appearance, and was an unused substitute for the next two fixtures.

==== Loan moves ====
Having failed to feature in the matchday squad since then, Storer joined League Two club Yeovil Town on 1 January 2017, on loan until the end of the season. He went straight into the starting eleven for the following day's visit to Crawley Town, but he and Otis Khan were both substituted at half time as Yeovil lost 2–0. After two matches as an unused substitute, and missing one for personal reasons, his loan was cancelled on 25 January 2017 by mutual consent, again citing personal reasons.

Storer was omitted from Birmingham's under-23 training camp in July 2017 because he was joining another club on trial with a view to a loan move. He played for Macclesfield Town of the National League in a pre-season friendly against Derby County, but returned to Birmingham after an incident in that match.

In October 2017, Storer joined National League South club Gloucester City on a short-term loan. He made his debut in the starting eleven for Gloucester's league match at home to Braintree Town on 7 October, and played 64 minutes as his team lost 3–1. He finished his loan spell with one goal from seven league appearances.

Storer signed for Solihull Moors of the National League on 22 December 2017 on loan for a month. He went straight into the starting eleven for the visit of Boreham Wood, and twice came close to scoring in the first half, but the match finished goalless. He made one more substitute appearance before returning to his parent club. In February 2018, Birmingham confirmed that Storer would be released when his contract expired at the end of the season.

=== Partick Thistle ===
After a successful trial, Storer signed for Scottish Championship club Partick Thistle in early July 2018, on a one-year deal with the option of a second year. He admitted later that he genuinely feared his reputation for hotheadedness would prevent him ever finding another club. He made his debut in the League Cup on 14 July away to Stenhousemuir, starting as an attacking midfielder and playing 66 minutes as Thistle won 2–0. Storer scored his first Thistle goal three days later to open the scoring in their second group match, a 2–1 victory against Greenock Morton. Meeting a defensive clearance well outside the penalty area, he "slammed a half-volley towards goal, meeting the ball on the rise and finding the top corner"; according to the Herald's match report, the ball "was still gathering speed as it nestled in the top corner. If it's not goal of the season then the eventual winner is going to be something out of this world." Storer had his contract with the club terminated by mutual consent on 21 December 2018.

=== Later career ===
Storer returned to England in 2019. After spells at Redditch United and Mickleover Sports, Storer moved to Leamington F.C. in February 2020.

In mid-March 2020, he then moved to AFC Telford United. However, he made only one appearance due to the COVID-19 pandemic. He kept training with the club in the summer 2020 but ended up re-joining Redditch United. The club released him in September 2020. Storer then joined Gresley Rovers in October 2020. In the summer of 2021 he signed for Midland League side Highgate United before he had another short spell at rivals Stourport Swifts. In November, he moved up a couple of divisions to sign for Southern League Premier Division side Stratford Town.

In June 2025, Storer returned to Stratford Town for a fourth spell.

== Career statistics ==
As of match played 3 November 2018

Appearances and goals by club, season and competition
Club	Season	League			National Cup		League Cup (Note: Includes appearances in EFL Cup and Scottish League Cup)		Other		Total	
Club	Season	Division	Apps	Goals	Apps	Goals	Apps	Goals	Apps	Goals	Apps	Goals
Stevenage	2014–15	League Two	0	0	0	0	0	0	0	0	0	0
Stevenage	2015–16	League Two	1	0	0	0	0	0	0	0	1	0
Stevenage	Total		1	0	0	0	0	0	0	0	1	0
Birmingham City	2016–17	Championship	4	0	0	0	1	0	—		5	0
Birmingham City	2017–18	Championship	0	0	0	0	0	0	—		0	0
Birmingham City	Total		4	0	0	0	1	0	—		5	0
Yeovil Town (loan)	2016–17	League Two	1	0	—		—		0	0	1	0
Gloucester City (loan)	2017–18	National League South	7	1	—		—		1 (Note: Appearance in FA Trophy)	0	8	1
Solihull Moors (loan)	2017–18	National League	2	0	—		—		0	0	2	0
Partick Thistle	2018–19	Scottish Championship	4	0	0	0	5	1	2 (Note: Appearances in Scottish Challenge Cup)	0	11	1
Career total			19	1	0	0	6	1	3	0	28	2
