= Joe Lea =

English footballer (born 1997)

Personal information
- Date of birth: 16 December 1997 (age 28)
- Place of birth: Portsmouth, England
- Position: Midfielder

Team information
- Current team: Havant & Waterlooville (joint manager)

Youth career
- –2007: Portsmouth
- 2007–2016: Southampton

Senior career*
Years	Team	Apps	(Gls)
2016–2017	Yeovil Town	0	(0)
2016	→ Dorchester Town (loan)	6	(0)
2017	→ Gosport Borough (loan)	16	(2)
2017–2018	Bognor Regis Town	11	(0)
2018–2022	Gosport Borough		
2022–2023	Petersfield Town		

Managerial career
- 2022–2023: Petersfield Town
- 2023–2025: Gosport Borough
- 2025–2026: Poole Town
- 2026–: Havant & Waterlooville
- * Club domestic league appearances and goals

Joe Lea (born 16 December 1997) is an English football coach and former player who is joint manager of Havant & Waterlooville.

Lea played as a midfielder.

== Playing career ==
=== Early career ===
Born in Portsmouth, Lea signed for his local side Portsmouth as a youngster before moving to south-coast rivals Southampton at the age of 9. Lea spent nine years in the Southampton youth academy before being released upon the completion of his two-year scholarship.

=== Yeovil Town ===
Upon his release from Southampton, Lea joined Yeovil Town on 2 July 2016, alongside Josh Ezewele from West Bromwich Albion. He made his professional debut on 23 August 2016 as a substitute in a League Cup match at Everton.

On 15 October 2016, Lea joined Southern Premier League side Dorchester Town on an initial one-month loan deal, and Lea made his debut for Dorchester that afternoon as a second-half substitute against Dunstable Town.

In January 2017, Lea joined National League South side Gosport Borough on loan until the end of the season.

At the end of the 2016–17 season, Lea was released by Yeovil having only made two appearances for the club.

=== Later career ===
After a successful trial, Lea signed for newly promoted National League South club Bognor Regis Town in July 2017.

Lea signed for Gosport Borough on 18 January 2018.

== Coaching career ==
In April 2022, Lea and his former teammate at Gosport Borough, Pat Suraci, were appointed co-managers at Petersfield Town. In January 2023, having retained his registration as a player at Petersfield, Lea announced his retirement in order to focus on his coaching career.

In May 2023, Lea and Suraci returned to Gosport as co-managers. They left the club in January 2025, to take over at fellow Southern League club Poole Town.

In October 2026, Lea and Suraci departed Poole Town, and were named as managers of Havant & Waterlooville a week later.

== Career statistics ==
As of 1 May 2018.

Appearances and goals by club, season and competition
Club	Season	League			FA Cup		League Cup		Other		Total	
Club	Season	Division	Apps	Goals	Apps	Goals	Apps	Goals	Apps	Goals	Apps	Goals
Yeovil Town	2016–17	League Two	0	0	0	0	1	0	1 (Note: Appearance in EFL Trophy)	0	2	0
Dorchester Town (loan)	2016–17	Southern Premier	6	0	0	0	—		2 (Note: One appearance in FA Trophy, one appearance in Dorset Senior Cup)	0	8	0
Gosport Borough (loan)	2016–17	National League South	16	2	0	0	—		0	0	16	2
Bognor Regis Town	2017–18	National League South	11	0	2	0	—		2 (Note: One appearance in FA Trophy, one appearance in Sussex Senior Cup)	0	15	0
Gosport Borough	2017–18	Southern Premier	14	1	—		—		—		14	1
Career total			47	3	2	0	1	0	5	0	55	3
