= Shaun Gale =

English football player and manager (born 1969)

Personal information
- Full name: Shaun Michael Gale
- Date of birth: 8 October 1969 (age 57)
- Place of birth: Reading, England
- Position: Full-back

Team information
- Current team: Havant & Waterlooville (caretaker manager)

Senior career*
| Years | Team | Apps | (Gls) |
| 1988–1994 | Portsmouth | 3 | (0) |
| 1994–1997 | Barnet | 114 | (5) |
| 1997–2000 | Exeter City | 93 | (5) |
| 2000–2003 | Havant & Waterlooville | 86 | (2) |
| Total | | 296 | (12) |

Managerial career
- 2004–2007: Havant & Waterlooville (assistant)
- 2007–2012: Havant & Waterlooville
- 2012–2019: Havant & Waterlooville (assistant)
- 2019: Eastbourne Borough (assistant)
- 2020–2022: Gosport Borough
- 2026–: Havant & Waterlooville (caretaker)
- * Club domestic league appearances and goals

Shaun Michael Gale (8 October 1969) is an English football manager and former player who is currently caretaker manager at Havant & Waterlooville.

== Playing career ==
Gale was born in Reading. He started his playing career at Portsmouth as a trainee in July 1988, but only made a handful of appearances in six years before moving to Barnet in 1994. At Barnet he became a regular starter making over 130 appearances in three seasons.

In June 1997, Exeter City manager Peter Fox paid £10,000 to bring Gale to St James Park, where he was again a regular starter before a series of injuries started to interrupt his career.

In August 2000, he moved on a free transfer to Havant & Waterlooville, where he made over 100 appearances in his first two seasons. He sustained a broken arm during a friendly in August 2003 and the repercussions kept him off the pitch for the whole of the 2003–04 season, eventually forcing his retirement from playing. In February 2004 he took up the position as David Leworthy's right-hand man and remained in the role under Ian Baird.

== Managerial career ==
=== Havant & Waterlooville ===
In October 2007, he was appointed as manager to The Hawks following Ian Baird's departure to Conference South rivals Eastleigh.

In the 2007–08 FA Cup, the Gale-led Hawks beat Bognor Regis, Fleet Town, Leighton Town, York City and Notts County, before causing a shock by defeating League One side Swansea City 4–2 in a third round replay. In the fourth round they played Premier League Liverpool at Anfield, and caused a sensation by leading twice before losing 5–2.

The 2011–12 season was a poor one for Havant & Waterlooville, and after dropping to second from bottom in the league following a defeat at Basingstoke Town, Gale was sacked on 1 April. He has since been appointed as assistant manager at the club, with Lee Bradbury as the main manager.

After nearly 20 years at the club, Gale announced his departure on 24 May 2019.

=== Eastbourne Borough ===
On 28 May 2019, Gale was announced as the assistant manager of Lee Bradbury once again, this time at Eastbourne Borough.

=== Gosport Borough ===
On 9 June 2020, Gale was announced as manager of Gosport Borough. After two years at Gosport, the club announced Gale had been relieved of managerial duties on 9 November 2022.

=== Return to Havant & Waterlooville ===
On 24 September 2026, Gale was appointed caretaker manager at Havant & Waterlooville
