= Havant & Waterlooville F.C. =

Association football club in Havant, England

Coordinates: 50°52′01″N 0°58′27″W

Havant & Waterlooville
- Full name: Havant & Waterlooville Football Club
- Nickname: The Hawks
- Founded: 1998; 28 years ago
- Ground: Westleigh Park, Havant
- Capacity: 5,300 (710 seated)
- Chairman: Derek Pope
- Manager: Joe Lea & Pat Suraci
- League: Southern League Premier Division South
- 2025–26: Southern League Premier Division South, 10th of 22
- Website: havantandwaterloovillefc.co.uk
Home colours	Away colours

Havant & Waterlooville Football Club is a professional association football club based in Havant, Hampshire, England. The club participates in the Southern League Premier Division South, the seventh level of English football, after relegation from the National League South in the 2023–24 season. The club formed in 1998 after a merger between Havant Town and Waterlooville. Nicknamed "The Hawks", they play at Westleigh Park.

== History ==
In 1998, Havant Town and Waterlooville merged to play at Havant Town's Westleigh Park ground. In their first season as a merged team, Havant & Waterlooville won the Southern League Southern Division under the management of former Crystal Palace and Portsmouth defender Billy Gilbert. There was also instant success in the FA Cup, a penalty shoot-out defeat to Hayes was all that denied the Hawks an opportunity to visit league side Mansfield Town in the first round proper.

After Billy Gilbert left Havant & Waterlooville, Mick Jenkins and Liam Daish were appointed joint managers in April 2000. Jenkins and Daish guided the Hawks to notable successes in the FA Cup where they reached the first round, the first of four occasions achieved by the club. In 2000–01, Havant & Waterlooville lost 2–1 at home to Southport of the Conference North, and 3–2 away to another Conference side, Dagenham & Redbridge in 2002–03. The 2002–03 season was also notable for the Hawks' FA Trophy run when Havant & Waterlooville 'giant-killed' Forest Green Rovers en route to the semi-final where Hawks lost 2–1 on aggregate to Tamworth.

During a 5-year stay in the Southern League Premier Division from 1999–2000 to 2004–05, Havant & Waterlooville's best season came in 2001–02, finishing 3rd after leading the table during September. In the 2003–04 season, the club struggled and this led to Jenkins and Daish being dismissed in January 2004. However, the club recovered and finished 12th in the Southern League Premier Division and thereby qualified for a place in the re-structured Conference South.

Ian Baird took over the part-time managerial post at Havant & Waterlooville in November 2004. In 2005–06, the club missed out on a place in the end of season play-offs by a single point because of a controversial three-point deduction for breaking a gentleman's agreement with Weymouth that Havant & Waterlooville's ex-Weymouth player Tony Taggart would not play against his former club. Hawks manager Ian Baird claimed that an injury crisis had forced him to field Taggart in the home game with Weymouth.

In the 2006–07 season, the Hawks qualified for the promotion play-offs but were beaten in the semi-final by Braintree Town. The club met a Football League club in a competitive match for the first time in the 2006–07 competition, losing 2–1 to Millwall in a 'home' match which was played at Fratton Park.

Baird resigned as manager on 1 October 2007 to become manager of Eastleigh and was replaced by Shaun Gale. In the 2007–08 FA Cup, the Hawks beat Bognor Regis, Fleet Town, Leighton Town, Conference Premier team York City and League Two club Notts County, before causing an even bigger upset by defeating League One side Swansea City 4–2 in a third round replay. In the fourth round, they played Premier League Liverpool at Anfield and caused a sensation by leading twice before eventually losing 5–2. Havant & Waterlooville player Alfie Potter, on loan at the time from Peterborough United, was voted 'Player of the Round'.

The Hawks were involved in a relegation battle in the 2008–09 season despite being among the favourites to win the league at the start of the season, but ultimately secured Conference South survival with three games remaining. 2008–09 did, however, see diverting runs in the FA Cup (ending with a first-round home defeat to League Two Brentford) and in the FA Trophy (ending with a 2–0 defeat away to York City in the quarter-finals).

In 2009–10, Havant & Waterlooville made a late run that almost got them to the playoffs but Woking pipped them to the post by one point.

In July 2011, the club played a "once in a lifetime" game against La Liga side Real Betis, losing 7–0, after the Spanish club's original friendly opponents (Portsmouth) found themselves unable to play the game.

The 2011–12 season was a poor one for Havant & Waterlooville, and after dropping to second from bottom in the league following a defeat at Basingstoke Town, Shaun Gale was sacked on 1 April. Assistant manager Steve Johnson and stadium manager/fitness coach Adrian Aymes were placed in charge on a caretaker basis. In a tense finale, the Hawks avoided relegation with literally the last kick by a Havant & Waterlooville player in the entire season; Joe Dolan's 93rd-minute winner in the final match against Staines Town ensuring that Maidenhead United (who believed themselves to be safe having scored a last-minute winner themselves) would fill the final relegation spot.

On 8 May 2012, the Hawks appointed Stuart Ritchie as manager and Sean New as his assistant, the combination having been successful in partnership during eight years at AFC Totton. Ritchie played 53 games for the Hawks in their first two seasons as a combined club (1998–2000). Sean New was replaced just one month later by Barry Blankley over a "failure to disclose particular information" scandal. Just ten games into his reign, Stuart Ritchie was dismissed after just one win in those ten and a shock loss to Southern League South & West side North Leigh F.C. in the FA Cup.

On 9 October 2012, Lee Bradbury was appointed manager. leading the club to 10th place at the end of that 2012–13 season.

The 2013–14 season was an eventful one, with the club reaching the FA Trophy semi-finals, losing 3–1 on aggregate over two-legs against local rivals Gosport Borough. As a result of the Trophy run as well as weather-related postponements, the Hawks were required to play over half of their league campaign (22 games) within the final 57 days of the season. Despite this the Hawks went into the final game of the season against Tonbridge Angels with a chance of making the play-offs. When the final whistle blew in that game, a 0–0 draw was enough, however in their match still on-going Dover Athletic scored a goal to mean that the Hawks would miss out on goal difference. In addition to the FA Trophy and Conference South disappointments, the Hawks also lost in the final of the Hampshire Senior Cup to Basingstoke Town 3–2 after extra time, despite battling back from a two-goal deficit to equalise in the final minute of injury time.

The Hawks went one better in their 2014–15 Conference South campaign, finishing 5th and making the playoffs. However, the Hawks lost 4–2 on aggregate to eventual winners Boreham Wood. During this season, the Hawks also made the first round proper of the FA Cup, losing eventually to League One side Preston North End.

Despite starting the 2015–16 Conference South season as favourites, the Hawks were relegated on goal difference. They did, however, win the Hampshire Senior Cup, beating Winchester City 5–3 on penalties at St Mary's Stadium, Southampton.

Placed into the Isthmian League following relegation, the Havant & Waterlooville board kept faith with manager Lee Bradbury, who led the team to the title on the final day of the season. Trailing Bognor Regis Town by a point prior to the penultimate round of matches, the Hawks won 1–0 at home against their title rivals, in front of new league record crowd for the Hawks of 3,455. This result meant the Hawks needed to win their final game at Kingstonian or match Bognor's result. The Hawks drew 0-0 but, despite leading 1–0 with 20 minutes left, Bognor could only draw at home to Metropolitan Police, allowing a sizeable contingent of travelling Hawks fans to watch their team collect the trophy as 2016–17 Isthmian League champions.

After being promoted the previous season, the Hawks won the 2017–18 National League South, winning it on the final day with a win against Concord Rangers where Jason Prior scored the 89th minute winning goal. Prior was also the Hawk's leading scorer in their successful league campaign and the 5th top scorer in the league that season with 23 goals.

In the 2018–19 season, Havant & Waterlooville struggled to adjust to life in the National League and were relegated with three matches remaining. On 22 April 2019, Havant & Waterlooville released a statement confirming Lee Bradbury had left by mutual consent. The next day, assistant manager Shaun Gale was appointed caretaker manager for their final two games of the season. On 29 April, it was announced that former Sutton United manager Paul Doswell had signed a three-year contract, bringing Ian Baird back to the club as his assistant.

In 2019–20 National League South, the Hawks switched to morning training, three days a week. As a result, the squad was transformed with only three players remaining from that which completed the previous season. The new look Hawks challenged at the top of the division until the season was curtailed in March due to the COVID-19 pandemic. At first, it appeared as though the League would only promote the leading club, given the circumstances. As the Hawks stood second in the division they, along with the similarly placed York City of the National League North, started the #promote2 campaign for play-offs to take place or the second place club to be promoted. Eventually, play-offs did take place but the club lost 2–1 to Dartford in their home semi-final.

On 10 March 2023, Paul Doswell moved into a Director of Football role, with Jamie Collins becoming manager. However, after a poor start to the 2023–24 National League South season, Collins was sacked on 8 September. On 1 December 2023, Steve King was sacked. The 2023–24 season ended in relegation to the seventh tier. On 1 May 2024, Shaun North was appointed as first team manager. On the 11th of November, 2025, Shaun North was sacked to be replaced by Aaron Martin. After being bottom of the table prior to the change, a series of good results over the winter period lifted the Hawks at one point into potential play off contention. This momentum was not maintained however and the club finished 10th.

After seven seasons, the Hawks returned to a part-time training model ahead of the 2026–27 campaign. A poor start to that season though led to Aaron Martin being sacked in September 2026.. Having resigned as Poole Town managers the week prior, Joe Lea and Pat Suraci were confirmed as managers on 9th October 2026.

== Rivalries ==
Due to managerial, player and administrative issues between the clubs, matches against Eastleigh F.C., Worthing F.C. and Weymouth F.C. have been particularly feisty in the past. The Hawks main rival however is usually considered to be Gosport Borough F.C.

== Stadium ==
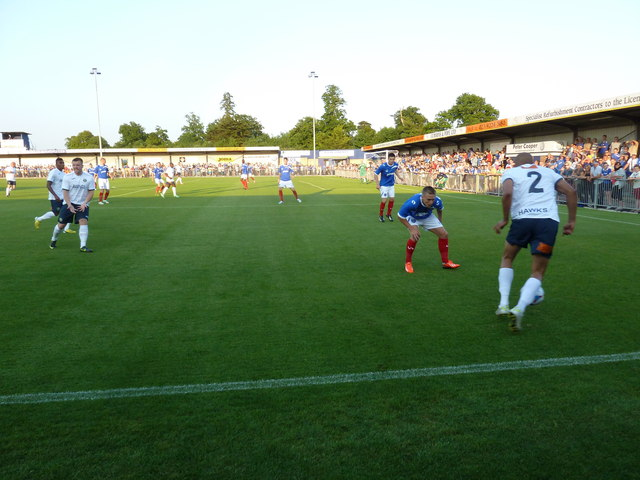
Match at Westleigh Park

The club play at Westleigh Park. Located on Bartons Triangle, Martins Road, West Leigh, Havant. It was home to Havant Town from 1982 onwards while Waterlooville F.C. played at the now extinct Jubilee Park. It currently has a capacity of 5,300, of which 710 is seated. The record attendance at the ground is 4,400, for the 4–2 third round FA Cup replay win against Swansea City on 16 January 2008. The record attendance for a league fixture was set on 17 April 2017, when 3,455 watched a penultimate 2016–17 Isthmian League fixture against Bognor Regis Town F.C., when the two clubs were placed first and second in the table. The club's record attendance for any home game is 5,793, for the FA Cup first round defeat to Millwall F.C. on 13 November 2006. They played at Portsmouth.

== Current squad ==
As of 15 August 2026

Note: Flags indicate national team as defined under FIFA eligibility rules; some limited exceptions apply. Players may hold more than one non-FIFA nationality.

No.	Pos.	Nation	Player
01	GK	ENG	Matt Kerbey
02	DF	ENG	Harry Kavanagh
03	DF	ENG	Harvey Laidlaw
05	DF	ENG	Charlie Kennedy
06	DF	ENG	Imran Uche
15	DF	ENG	Mason Hunter
20	DF	ENG	Gabriel Cuthbert
23	DF	COD	Christian Maghoma
24	DF	ENG	Richard Brindley

No.	Pos.	Nation	Player
04	MF	ENG	Blaise Riley-Snow
11	MF	ENG	Leon Maloney
08	MF	ENG	Alfy Wittingham
14	MF	ENG	Harry Thorpe
17	MF	ENG	Faris Khallouqi
18	MF	ENG	Andreas Robinson
19	MF	ENG	Mitch Aston
09	FW	ENG	Ryan Seager
10	FW	ENG	Paul McCallum
17	FW	ENG	Ethan Giwa-McNeil

== Youth teams ==
Havant & Waterlooville now has an academy team for the club's most promising youth players, run in conjunction with South Downs College and playing in the Conference Academy League Southern Section. For the 2009–10 season, this has increased to include two more reserve teams, playing in the Hampshire and Sussex College leagues. They also have a team who play in Boulters Lane, Southwick. Nathan Ashmore, who left to join Gosport Borough, was the first player to be promoted from the academy team to the first team in the 2008–09 season.

== Management ==
Managers

- (England) Joe Lea & (England) Pat Suraci (Oct 2026 - date)
- (England) Aaron Martin (Nov 2025 - Sep 2026)
- (England) Shaun North – (May 2024 – Nov 2025)
- (England) Steve King – (Sep 2023 – Dec 2023)
- (England) Jamie Collins (Mar 2023 – Sep 2023)
- (England) Paul Doswell (Apr 2019 – Mar 2023)
- (England) Lee Bradbury (Oct 2012 – Apr 2019)
- (England) Stuart Ritchie (May 2012 – Sep 2012)
- (England) Shaun Gale (Oct 2007 – Mar 2012)
- (England) Ian Baird (Nov 2004 – Oct 2007)
- (England) Dave Leworthy (Jan 2004 – Nov 2004)
- (England) Mick Jenkins & (Republic of Ireland) Liam Daish (Apr 2000 – Jan 2004)
- (England) Billy Gilbert (Jun 1998 – Apr 2000)

Assistant Managers

- (England) Shaun Gale (May 2026 – Sep 2026)
- (England) Ross Betteridge – (May 2024 – May 2025)
- (England) Matthew Barnes-Homer (Sep 2023 – Dec 2023)
- (England) Joe Oastler (Aug 2023 - Sep 2023)
- (England) Ian Baird (Apr 2019 – Aug 2023)
- (England) Shaun Gale (Oct 2012 – Apr 2019)
- (England) Barry Blankley (Jun 2012 – Sep 2012)
- (England) Sean New (May 2012 – Jun 2012)
- (England) Steve Johnson (Jun 2009 – Mar 2012)
- (England) Charlie Oatway (Oct 2007 – Jun 2009)
- (England) Shaun Gale (Jan 2004 – Oct 2007)
- (England) Mick Jenkins (Jun 1998 – Apr 2000)

Caretakers

- (England) Shaun Gale (Sep 2026 - Oct 2026)
- (England) Cliff de Gordon (Nov 2025)
- (England) Cliff de Gordon, (England) Ross Betteridge & (England) Richard Pope (Dec 2023 – April 2024)
- (England) Shaun Gale (Sep 2023)
- (England) Shaun Gale (Apr 2019)
- (England) Adrian Aymes (Sep 2012 – Oct 2012)
- (England) Steve Johnson & (England) Adrian Aymes (Apr 2012 – May 2012)
- (England) Shaun Gale (Nov 2004)

== Internationals ==
England C^ internationals:

- (England) James Taylor (2002)
- (England) Tim Hambley (2002)
- (England) Alfie Pavey (2018)

^ formerly 'England National Game XI'

Full internationals: (only those capped whilst at club shown)

- (Dominica) Richard Pacquette
- (Guyana) Jake Newton
- (Lithuania) Tomas Kalinauskas
- (Grenada) Jacob Berkeley-Agyepong
- (Grenada) Anthony Straker

== Records ==
- Best FA Cup performance: 4th round (2007–08)
- Best FA Trophy performance: Semi-finals (2002–03, 2013–14)

== Honours ==
League

- National League South (level 6)
  - Champions: 2017–18
- Isthmian League (level 7)
  - Champions: 2016–17
- Southern League Southern
  - Champions: 1998–99

Cup

- Portsmouth Senior Cup
  - Winners: 2015, 2017, 2018
- Hampshire Senior Cup
  - Winners: 2016, 2018, 2019
