= Kyle Copp =

Welsh footballer

Personal information
- Full name: Kyle Thomas Copp
- Date of birth: 1 November 1996 (age 30)
- Place of birth: Swansea, Wales
- Height: 1.78 m (5 ft 10 in)
- Position: Midfielder

Team information
- Current team: Pure Swansea

Youth career
- 2002–2016: Swansea City

Senior career*
Years	Team	Apps	(Gls)
2016	Yeovil Town	0	(0)
2016–2018	Merthyr Town		
2018	CD Almuñecar City	8	(9)
2018–2019	Atarfe Industrial	5	(1)
2019–2020	Llanelli Town		
2020–2021	Redditch United		
2021	Llanelli Town	13	(6)
2021–2022	St Joseph's	12	(14)
2023	Trefelin BGC	11	(1)
2023–2024	Mumbles Rangers	7	(2)
2024–2025	St Joseph's	33	(61)
2025–2026	Pontardawe Town	29	(25)
2026–	Pure Swansea	12	(8)

International career^{‡}
2012	Wales U17	3	(0)
- * Club domestic league appearances and goals as of 10:52, 16 November 2026 (UTC) ‡ National team caps and goals as of 21:54, 3 October 2016 (UTC)

Kyle Thomas Copp (born 1 November 1996) is a Welsh semi-professional footballer who plays as a midfielder for Pure Swansea.

== Club career ==
Copy began his career with Swansea City at the age of 6, turning professional in 2015. Following his release from Swansea, Copp signed for Football League Two side Yeovil Town on non-contract terms. He made his professional debut on 30 August 2016 as a substitute in Yeovil's 4–3 victory over Portsmouth, in the EFL Trophy.

On 30 December 2016, Copp signed for Southern League Premier Division side Merthyr Town. He moved to Spanish club CD Almuñecar City in January 2018.

In December 2018, Copp joined Tercera División side Atarfe Industrial.

In September 2020, Copp signed for Redditch United in the Southern Premier Division and made his debut as a substitute in an away win over Banbury United. In January 2021, he returned to Llanelli Town. He left the club in November 2021,

After playing for Pontardawe Town, he moved to Trefelin BGC in January 2023. He signed for Mumbles Rangers in August 2023.

In January 2024 he joined Swansea Senior League side St Josephs, and played for them as they were promoted to the West Wales Premier League. In the 2024–25 West Wales Premier League he won the golden boot, scoring 47 goals.

In the 2025–26 season he played for Pontardawe Town, signing for Pure Swansea in July 2026.

== International career ==
He has played for the Wales under-17 team.

== Career statistics ==
As of 7 February 2019.

Appearances and goals by club, season and competition
Club	Season	League			National Cup		League Cup		Other		Total	
Club	Season	Division	Apps	Goals	Apps	Goals	Apps	Goals	Apps	Goals	Apps	Goals
Yeovil Town	2016–17	League Two	0	0	0	0	0	0	1	0	1	0
CD Almuñecar City	2017–18	Tercera Andaluza	1	0	0	0	0	0	0	0	1	0
CD Almuñecar City	2018–19	Segunda Andaluza	7	8	0	0	0	0	0	0	7	8
CD Almuñecar City	Total		8	8	0	0	0	0	0	0	8	8
Atarfe Industrial	2018–19	Tercera División	3	1	0	0	0	0	0	0	3	1
Career total			11	9	0	0	0	0	1	0	12	9
