= Shayon Harrison =

English footballer (born 1997)

Personal information
- Full name: Shayon Adam Harrison
- Date of birth: 13 July 1997 (age 29)
- Place of birth: Hornsey, England
- Height: 1.83 m (6 ft 0 in)
- Position: Forward

Team information
- Current team: Eastbourne Borough
- Number: 23

Youth career
- 2013–2016: Tottenham Hotspur

Senior career*
Years	Team	Apps	(Gls)
2016–2019	Tottenham Hotspur	0	(0)
2017	→ Yeovil Town (loan)	14	(1)
2018	→ Southend United (loan)	13	(0)
2019	→ Melbourne City (loan)	10	(4)
2019–2021	Almere City	32	(8)
2021	AFC Wimbledon	1	(0)
2021–2022	Morecambe	3	(0)
2022	Hayes & Yeading United	2	(0)
2022–2025	Politehnica Iași	63	(16)
2025	UTA Arad	9	(1)
2025	AC Oulu	10	(2)
2026	Tatran Prešov	0	(0)
2026–	Eastbourne Borough	7	(2)
- * Club domestic league appearances and goals as of 23:35, 10 November 2026 (UTC)

Shayon Adam Harrison (born 13 July 1997) is an English professional footballer who plays as a forward for Isthmian League Premier Division club Eastbourne Borough.

== Club career ==
=== Tottenham Hotspur ===
Harrison made his professional debut for Tottenham on 25 October 2016, coming on in the 83rd minute for Georges-Kévin Nkoudou in a 2–1 defeat to Liverpool in the EFL Cup.

On 20 January 2017, Harrison joined League Two side Yeovil Town on loan until the end of the season. He made his debut for Yeovil in a 2–2 draw against Blackpool, on 21 January 2017. For the second half of the 2017–18 season Harrison went on loan to Southend United.

In the January 2019 transfer window, Harrison went out on loan to Australian club Melbourne City of the A-League.

=== Holland and English lower leagues ===
In the summer 2019 transfer window, Harrison signed for Almere City in Holland. On 1 February 2021, he was released by Almere.

On 8 February 2021, Harrison joined League One side AFC Wimbledon on a free transfer. On 11 August 2021, Harrison joined League One side Morecambe. On 11 January 2022, Harrison left the club following the expiration of his short-term contract. On 1 March 2022, Harrison joined Southern League Premier Division South leaders Hayes & Yeading United.

=== Politehnica Iași ===
On 25 August 2022, Harrison was officially announced as Romanian Liga II side Politehnica Iași's new signing. After winning promotion to Liga I in 2023, he went on a goal scoring streak of 5 goals in 6 games in November.

=== AC Oulu ===
After a short stint with UTA Arad, Harrison moved to Finland and signed with Veikkausliiga club AC Oulu on 4 July 2025. On 13 July, Harrison scored in his debut for his new club shortly after being subbed on, by the winning goal in a crucial 3–2 home win over KTP.

On 29 January 2026, Harrison joined Slovak First Football League side Tatran Prešov on a free transfer.

=== Eastbourne Borough ===
On 25 September, Harrison returned to English football, signing for Isthmian Premier Division side Eastbourne Borough.

== Career statistics ==
As of match played 10 November 2026

Appearances and goals by club, season and competition
Club	Season	League			National cup (Note: Includes KNVB Cup, Cupa României, Finnish Cup)		League cup (Note: Includes EFL Cup)		Other		Total	
Club	Season	Division	Apps	Goals	Apps	Goals	Apps	Goals	Apps	Goals	Apps	Goals
Tottenham Hotspur	2016–17	Premier League	0	0	0	0	1	0	0	0	1	0
Tottenham Hotspur	2017–18	Premier League	0	0	0	0	0	0	0	0	0	0
Tottenham Hotspur	2018–19	Premier League	0	0	0	0	0	0	0	0	0	0
Tottenham Hotspur	Total		0	0	0	0	1	0	0	0	1	0
Yeovil Town (loan)	2016–17	League Two	14	1	—		—		1 (Note: Appearance(s) in EFL Trophy)	0	15	1
Southend United (loan)	2017–18	League One	13	0	—		—		—		13	0
Melbourne City (loan)	2018–19	A-League	10	4	—		—		1 (Note: Appearance(s) in A-League Final Series)	0	11	4
Almere City	2019–20	Eerste Divisie	21	7	1	0	—		—		22	7
Almere City	2020–21	Eerste Divisie	11	1	0	0	—		—		11	1
Almere City	Total		32	8	1	0	—		—		33	8
AFC Wimbledon	2020–21	League One	1	0	—		—		—		1	0
Morecambe	2021–22	League One	3	0	0	0	0	0	1	0	4	0
Hayes & Yeading United	2021–22	SL Premier Division South	2	0	—		—		—		2	0
Politehnica Iași	2022–23	Liga II	20	9	0	0	—		—		20	9
Politehnica Iași	2023–24	Liga I	29	7	0	0	—		—		29	7
Politehnica Iași	2024–25	Liga I	14	0	3	1	—		—		17	1
Politehnica Iași	Total		63	16	3	1	—		—		66	17
UTA Arad	2024–25	Liga I	9	1	—		—		—		9	1
AC Oulu	2025	Veikkausliiga	10	2	1	0	0	0	—		11	2
Tatran Prešov	2025–26	Slovak First League	0	0	1	0	0	0	—		1	0
Eastbourne Borough	2026–27	IL Premier Division	7	2	1	0	—		3 (Note: Two appearances in FA Trophy, one appearance and one goal in Sussex Senior Cup)	1	11	3
Career total			162	34	7	1	1	0	6	1	176	36

== Honours ==
Politehnica Iași

- Liga II: 2022–23
