= Stuart Ritchie (footballer) =

English footballer and manager (born 1968)

Stuart Arthur Ritchie (born 20 May 1968) is a retired English footballer, and was the manager of Havant & Waterlooville. He played as a centre midfielder. He became manager of H&W in May 2012 after eight years managing AFC Totton.

== Career ==
Ritchie started his footballing career at Aston Villa where he made one substitute appearance for the club against Manchester United at the age of 19. He then signed for Crewe Alexandra making 25 first team appearances before moving onto Waterford United and then into the English Non League system, playing for Bashley, Havant & Waterlooville and AFC Totton. Ritchie joined Totton as a player before being appointed as player-manager and then retiring from playing and becoming the club's full-time manager.

== Managerial career ==
=== AFC Totton ===
Appointed as AFC Totton manager in 2004, he oversaw the club's rise from Wessex League to Southern League Premier Division (losing play-off finalists in 2011–12) and runners up in the FA Vase in 2007.

=== Havant & Waterlooville ===
On 8 May 2012, Havant & Waterlooville appointed Ritchie as manager and Sean New as his assistant. Ritchie played 53 games for the Hawks in their first two seasons as a combined club (1998–2000). After just four months in charge, Ritchie was sacked leaving the side third bottom in the table.
