= Owain Jones (footballer, born 1996) =

Welsh footballer

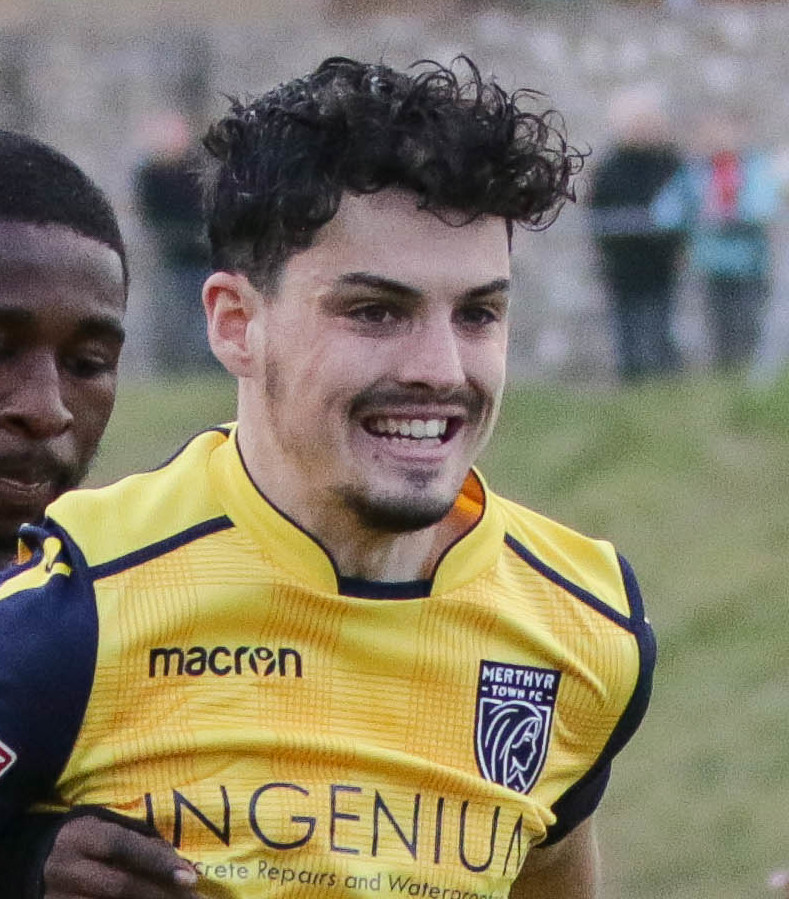
- Owain Jones in 2018

Personal information
- Full name: Owain Rhys Jones
- Date of birth: 1 October 1996 (age 30)
- Place of birth: Swansea, Wales
- Positions: Winger; striker

Team information
- Current team: Haverfordwest County
- Number: 20

Youth career
- 2004–2007: Pontardawe Town
- 2007–2015: Swansea City

Senior career*
Years	Team	Apps	(Gls)
2015–2017	Swansea City	0	(0)
2017	→ Yeovil Town (loan)	2	(0)
2017–2018	Merthyr Town	12	(4)
2018	Nuneaton Borough	4	(0)
2018	→ Merthyr Town (loan)	3	(1)
2018–2020	Merthyr Town	59	(11)
2020–2022	Aberystwyth Town	44	(11)
2022–2024	Pontypridd United	36	(6)
2024–	Haverfordwest County	58	(9)

International career
2011	Wales U16	2	(0)
2012–2013	Wales U17	4	(1)
2013–2015	Wales U19	12	(2)
2015	Wales U21	1	(0)
- * Club domestic league appearances and goals as of 07:51, 8 November 2026 (UTC)

Owain Rhys Jones (born 1 October 1996) is a Welsh footballer who plays as a winger or a striker for Cymru Premier side Haverfordwest County.

== Club career ==
Jones played junior football for Pontardawe Town Juniors AFC before signing for Swansea City at the age of 10. Jones was integrated into the Swansea City U21s squad during 2014–15 having scored 16 goals in 20 appearances for the U18s team. He was offered his first professional contract in 2014.

On 31 January 2017, Jones signed for Yeovil Town on loan until the end of the season. Jones made his English Football League debut for Yeovil against Hartlepool United, on 4 February.

Upon his return from his loan spell with Yeovil, Jones was released by Swansea at the end of the 2016–17 season. He then signed for Merthyr Town.

On 21 June 2018, Jones signed for National League North side Nuneaton Borough. He was loaned back to Merthyr Town in September 2018 before later joining permanently.

Following his departure from Merthyr, Jones signed for Cymru Premier side Aberystwyth Town on 17 June 2020. He was given the number 20 shirt for the 2020–21 season.

== International career ==
In 2011, Jones represented Wales at U16 level at a triangular tournament in Belgium involving the hosts, Wales and Switzerland.

The 2012–13 season saw Jones being called up into the Wales U17 squad in the European Championship Qualification Group stage against England, Northern Ireland and Estonia.

Jones was selected for the Wales U19s squad the following season for their European Championship Qualification Group stage in Georgia scoring the first goal in a 6–0 victory in their final game against Moldova – a win which ensured qualification for the Elite Round in Portugal where Jones made 2 further appearances. In 2014–15, Jones was again selected for the U19s squad U19 European Championship Qualification Group campaign and started in all 3 games in Portugal.

Still aged 18, Jones was called into the U21 squad for the European Championship fixture against Bulgaria at the Cardiff City Stadium on 31 March 2015. He was an unused substitute in a 3–1 win. Later in the qualification campaign, Jones made his debut in a 2–1 win over Armenia.

== Honours ==
=== Individual ===
- Swansea City U18 Player of the Year: 2014–15
