= 2012–13 Wigan Athletic F.C. season =

Wigan Athletic F.C.
2012–13 season
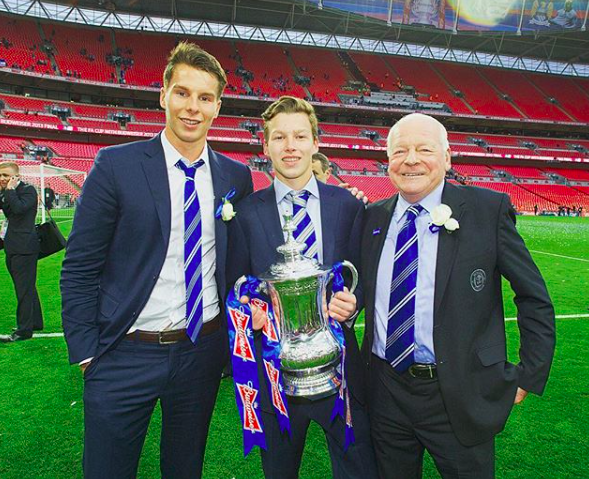
- Members of the Wigan Athletic board holding the FA Cup trophy following their team's victory
- Chairman: Dave Whelan
- Manager: Roberto Martínez
- Stadium: DW Stadium
- Premier League: 18th (relegated)
- FA Cup: Winners
- League Cup: Fourth round
- Top goalscorer: League: Arouna Koné (11); All: Arouna Koné (13)
- Highest home attendance: 23,001 vs. Aston Villa
- Lowest home attendance: 15,436 vs. Reading
| Home colours | Away colours | Third colours |

The 2012–13 season was Wigan Athletic's eighth consecutive season in the Premier League. The club competed in the League Cup and reached both the semi-finals and the final of the FA Cup for the first time in their history. They beat Everton 3–0 at Goodison Park, with all three goals scored within a four-minute spell, to progress to the semi-final, and defeated Millwall at Wembley Stadium to reach the final. On 11 May, the club won the FA Cup for the first time after a 1–0 win against Manchester City in the final. The club then went on to set the unwanted record of becoming the first ever team to win the FA Cup and be relegated in the same season, going down after a 4–1 defeat to Arsenal on 14 May.

== Transfers ==
=== In ===
| Date | Pos | Player | From | Fee | Source |
|---|---|---|---|---|---|
| 16 July 2012 | MF | (Scotland) Fraser Fyvie | (Scotland) Aberdeen | Undisclosed | |
| 2 August 2012 | DF | (Spain) Iván Ramis | (Spain) Mallorca | Undisclosed | |
| 13 August 2012 | MF | (Japan) Ryo Miyaichi | (England) Arsenal | Loan | |
| 14 August 2012 | FW | (Ivory Coast) Arouna Koné | (Spain) Levante | Undisclosed | |
| 2 January 2013 | FW | (Chile) Ángelo Henríquez | (England) Manchester United | Loan | |
| 4 January 2013 | MF | (Honduras) Roger Espinoza | (United States) Sporting Kansas City | Free transfer | |
| 17 January 2013 | GK | (Spain) Joel Robles | (Spain) Atlético Madrid | Loan | |
| 31 January 2013 | MF | (Austria) Paul Scharner | (Germany) Hamburger SV | Loan | |

=== Out ===
| Date | Position | Player | Transferred to | Fee | Source |
|---|---|---|---|---|---|
| 23 May 2012 | GK | (England) Chris Kirkland | (England) Sheffield Wednesday | Free transfer | |
| 21 June 2012 | MF | (Senegal) Mohamed Diamé | (England) West Ham United | Free transfer | |
| 30 June 2012 | DF | (Ivory Coast) Steve Gohouri | (Israel) Maccabi Tel Aviv | Free transfer | |
| 12 July 2012 | FW | (Colombia) Hugo Rodallega | (England) Fulham | Free transfer | |
| 10 August 2012 | MF | (England) Ryan Watson | (England) Accrington Stanley | Loan | |
| 11 August 2012 | MF | (England) Adam Dawson | (England) Accrington Stanley | Loan | |
| 17 August 2012 | ST | (Mali) Nouha Dicko | (England) Blackpool | Loan | |
| 20 August 2012 | FW | (Republic of Ireland) Conor Sammon | (England) Derby County | £1.2 million | |
| 21 August 2012 | MF | (Honduras) Hendry Thomas | (United States) Colorado Rapids | Free transfer | |
| 24 August 2012 | FW | (Nigeria) Victor Moses | (England) Chelsea | £9 million | |
| 31 August 2012 | DF | (Spain) Román Golobart | (England) Tranmere Rovers | Loan | |
| 6 November 2012 | GK | (England) Lee Nicholls | (England) Northampton Town | Loan | |
| 20 November 2012 | DF | (England) Jordan Mustoe | (England) Morecambe | Loan | |
| 28 January 2013 | FW | (Argentina) Mauro Boselli | (Italy) Palermo | Loan | |
| 31 January 2013 | DF | (Republic of Ireland) Rob Kiernan | (England) Brentford | Loan | |

== Competitions ==
=== Preseason ===
| 12 July 2012 | Östersunds FK | 0–1 | Wigan Athletic | Jämtkraft Arena, Sweden |
| 18:00 | | | Gómez 51' (pen.) | Attendance: 2,955 |

| 24 July 2012 | GW Micheldorf | 1–3 | Wigan Athletic | Micheldorf SV Stadium, Austria |
| 19:00 | Roidinger 64' | | Boselli 36'; Moses 62'; McManaman 87' | Attendance: 400 |

| 26 July 2012 | Wigan Athletic | 2–2 | Botev Plovdiv | Winkelfeld, Austria |
| 19:00 | Jones 22'; Boselli 54' | | Atanasov 37'; Cvetkov 68' (pen.) |

| 28 July 2012 | 1899 Hoffenheim | 1–1 | Wigan Athletic | Bad Wimsbach, Austria |
| 18:30 | Delpierre 40' | | Boselli 24' | Attendance: 650 |

| 5 August 2012 | Wigan Athletic | 0–2 | Mallorca | DW Stadium, England |
| 16:00 | | | Víctor 47'; Kevin 86' | Attendance: 2,124 |

| 12 August 2012 | Celta Vigo | 1–0 | Wigan Athletic | Balaídos, Spain |
| 20:00 | Aspas 49' | | | Attendance: 7,488 |

=== Premier League ===
==== Premier League ====
| 19 August 2012 1 | Wigan Athletic | 0–2 | Chelsea | Wigan |
| 13:30 BST | Caldwell (yellow card) 10'; McArthur (yellow card) 56' | Report | Ivanović 2'; Lampard 7' (pen.), (yellow card) 79'; David Luiz (yellow card) 34' | Stadium: DW Stadium; Attendance: 19,738; Referee: Mike Jones |

| 25 August 2012 2 | Southampton | 0–2 | Wigan Athletic | Southampton |
| 15:00 BST | | Report | Di Santo 50'; Koné 89' | Stadium: St Mary's Stadium; Attendance: 29,604; Referee: Anthony Taylor |

| 1 September 2012 3 | Wigan Athletic | 2–2 | Stoke City | Wigan |
| 15:00 BST | Maloney 5' (pen.); Di Santo 49' | Report | Walters 40' (pen.); Crouch 76' | Stadium: DW Stadium; Attendance: 16,247; Referee: Martin Atkinson |

| 15 September 2012 4 | Manchester United | 4–0 | Wigan Athletic | Manchester |
| 15:00 BST | Scholes 51'; Hernández 63'; Büttner (yellow card) 45+1', (goal) 66'; Powell 82'; Welbeck (yellow card) 90+3' | Report | Boyce (yellow card) 49'; McArthur (yellow card) 56' | Stadium: Old Trafford; Attendance: 75,142; Referee: Michael Oliver |

| 22 September 2012 5 | Wigan Athletic | 1–2 | Fulham | Wigan |
| 15:00 BST | Koné 90+1' | Report | Rodallega 31'; Duff 68' | Stadium: DW Stadium; Attendance: 19,284; Referee: Lee Probert |

| 29 September 2012 6 | Sunderland | 1–0 | Wigan Athletic | Sunderland |
| 15:00 BST | Fletcher 51' | Report | | Stadium: Stadium of Light; Attendance: 37,742; Referee: Howard Webb |

| 6 October 2012 7 | Wigan Athletic | 2–2 | Everton | Wigan |
| 15:00 BST | Koné 10'; Maloney (yellow card) 19'; Di Santo 23'; McCarthy (yellow card) 56' | Report | Jelavić 11', (yellow card) 60'; Fellaini (yellow card) 44'; Baines (yellow card) 58', (goal) 87' (pen.); Neville (yellow card) 75'; Anichebe (yellow card) 90+2' | Stadium: DW Stadium; Attendance: 18,759; Referee: Kevin Friend |

| 20 October 2012 8 | Swansea City | 2–1 | Wigan Athletic | Swansea |
| 15:00 BST | Hernández 65'; Michu 67' | Report | Boyce 69' | Stadium: Liberty Stadium; Attendance: 19,696; Referee: Mike Jones |

| 27 October 2012 9 | Wigan Athletic | 2–1 | West Ham United | Wigan |
| 15:00 BST | Ramis 8'; McArthur 47' | Report | Tomkins 90+2' | Stadium: DW Stadium; Attendance: 19,090; Referee: Jonathan Moss |

| 3 November 2012 10 | Tottenham Hotspur | 0–1 | Wigan Athletic | Tottenham |
| 15:00 GMT | | Report | Watson 56' | Stadium: White Hart Lane; Attendance: 35,534; Referee: Martin Atkinson |

| 10 November 2012 11 | Wigan Athletic | 1–2 | West Bromwich Albion | Wigan |
| 15:00 GMT | Koné 44'; McCarthy (yellow card) 78' | Report | Morrison 31'; Gary Caldwell 43' (o.g.); Yacob (yellow card) 47'; Lukaku (yellow card) 70'; Jones (yellow card) 77'; Gera (yellow card) 90' | Stadium: DW Stadium; Attendance: 17,812; Referee: Neil Swarbrick |

| 17 November 2012 12 | Liverpool | 3–0 | Wigan Athletic | Liverpool |
| 15:00 GMT | Suárez 47', 58'; José Enrique 65' | Report | | Stadium: Anfield; Attendance: 44,913; Referee: Kevin Friend |

| 24 November 2012 13 | Wigan Athletic | 3–2 | Reading | Wigan |
| 15:00 GMT | Gómez 58', 68', 90+2' | Report | Morrison 35'; Al-Habsi 80' (o.g.) | Stadium: DW Stadium; Attendance: 15,436; Referee: Howard Webb |

| 28 November 2012 14 | Wigan Athletic | 0–2 | Manchester City | Wigan |
| 20:00 GMT | Gómez (yellow card) 45+2' | Report | Barry (yellow card) 64'; Balotelli 69'; Milner 72' | Stadium: DW Stadium; Attendance: 19,623; Referee: Mark Halsey |

| 3 December 2012 15 | Newcastle United | 3–0 | Wigan Athletic | Newcastle upon Tyne |
| 20:00 GMT | Ba 13' (pen.), 21'; Bigirimana 71' | Report | | Stadium: St James' Park; Attendance: 43,858; Referee: Mike Jones |

| 8 December 2012 16 | Wigan Athletic | 2–2 | Queens Park Rangers | Wigan |
| 15:00 GMT | McCarthy 19', 74' | Report | Nelsen 26'; Cissé 71' | Stadium: DW Stadium; Attendance: 17,163; Referee: Phil Dowd |

| 15 December 2012 17 | Norwich City | 2–1 | Wigan Athletic | Norwich |
| 15:00 GMT | Pilkington 15'; Hoolahan 64' | Report | Maloney 51' | Stadium: Carrow Road; Attendance: 26,677; Referee: Lee Probert |

| 22 December 2012 18 | Wigan Athletic | 0–1 | Arsenal | Wigan |
| 12:45 GMT | | Report | Arteta 60' (pen.) | Stadium: DW Stadium; Attendance: 21,754; Referee: Jonathan Moss |

| 26 December 2012 19 | Everton | 2–1 | Wigan Athletic | Everton |
| 15:00 GMT | Osman 52'; Jagielka 77'; Jelavić (yellow card) 89' | Report | Beausejour (yellow card) 58'; Koné 82'; Figueroa (yellow card) 89' | Stadium: Goodison Park; Attendance: 38,749; Referee: Lee Mason |

| 29 December 2012 20 | Aston Villa | 0–3 | Wigan Athletic | Birmingham |
| 15:00 GMT | | Report | Ramis 3'; Boyce 52'; Koné 56' | Stadium: Villa Park; Attendance: 33,374; Referee: Kevin Friend |

| 1 January 2013 21 | Wigan Athletic | 0–4 | Manchester United | Wigan |
| 15:00 GMT | | Report | Hernández 35', 63'; Van Persie 43', 88' | Stadium: DW Stadium; Attendance: 20,342; Referee: Andre Marriner |

| 12 January 2013 22 | Fulham | 1–1 | Wigan Athletic | Fulham |
| 15:00 GMT | Karagounis 22' | Report | McArthur (yellow card) 35'; Di Santo 71' | Stadium: Craven Cottage; Attendance: 25,442; Referee: Mark Clattenburg |

| 19 January 2013 23 | Wigan Athletic | 2–3 | Sunderland | Wigan |
| 15:00 GMT | Vaughan 4' (o.g.); Henríquez 79' | Report | Gardner 17' (pen.); Fletcher 20', 42' | Stadium: DW Stadium; Attendance: 19,219; Referee: Anthony Taylor |

| 29 January 2013 24 | Stoke City | 2–2 | Wigan Athletic | Stoke |
| 19:45 GMT | Shawcross 23'; Crouch 48'; Whitehead (yellow card) 63' | Report | Espinoza (yellow card) 45+3'; McArthur 50'; Di Santo 61' | Stadium: Britannia Stadium; Attendance: 24,421; Referee: Mike Jones |

| 2 February 2013 25 | Wigan Athletic | 2–2 | Southampton | Wigan |
| 15:00 GMT | Caldwell 25'; Maloney 90' | Report | Lambert 64'; Schneiderlin 85' | Stadium: DW Stadium; Attendance: 18,598; Referee: Andre Marriner |

| 9 February 2013 26 | Chelsea | 4–1 | Wigan Athletic | Fulham |
| 15:00 GMT | Ramires 23'; Hazard 56'; Lampard 86'; Marin 90+3' | Report | Maloney 58' | Stadium: Stamford Bridge; Attendance: 41,562; Referee: Dean |

| 23 February 2013 27 | Reading | 0–3 | Wigan Athletic | Reading |
| 15:00 GMT | | Report | Koné 44', 45'; Figueroa 48' | Stadium: Madejski Stadium; Referee: Phil Dowd |

| 2 March 2013 28 | Wigan Athletic | 0–4 | Liverpool | Wigan |
| 17:30 GMT | Caldwell (yellow card) 35'; McArthur (yellow card) 59' | Report | Downing 2'; Suárez 18', 34', 49'; Allen (yellow card) 44'; Lucas (yellow card) 45+2' | Stadium: DW Stadium; Attendance: 20,804; Referee: Martin Atkinson |

| 17 March 2013 29 | Wigan Athletic | 2–1 | Newcastle United | Wigan |
| 16:00 GMT | Beausejour 18'; Scharner (yellow card) 45+3'; Koné 90' | Report | Perch (yellow card) 50'; Gutiérrez (yellow card) 67'; Santon 72' | Stadium: DW Stadium; Attendance: 22,297; Referee: Mark Halsey |

| 30 March 2013 30 | Wigan Athletic | 1–0 | Norwich City | Wigan |
| 15:00 GMT | Scharner (yellow card) 9'; Koné 81' | Report | Bennett (yellow card) 55'; Holt (yellow card) 87' | Stadium: DW Stadium; Attendance: 17,784; Referee: Howard Webb |

| 7 April 2013 31 | Queens Park Rangers | 1–1 | Wigan Athletic | London |
| 16:10 BST | Rémy 85' | Report | Maloney 90+4' | Stadium: Loftus Road; Attendance: 16,658; Referee: Phil Dowd |

| 17 April 2013 32 | Manchester City | 1–0 | Wigan Athletic | Manchester |
| 19:45 BST | Tevez 83' | Report | | Stadium: City of Manchester Stadium; Attendance: 47,106; Referee: Anthony Taylor |

| 20 April 2013 33 | West Ham United | 2–0 | Wigan Athletic | London |
| 15:00 BST | Jarvis 21'; Nolan 80' | Report | | Stadium: Boleyn Ground; Attendance: 34,544; Referee: Neil Swarbrick |

| 27 April 2013 34 | Wigan Athletic | 2–2 | Tottenham Hotspur | Wigan |
| 15:00 BST | Boyce 11'; McManaman 49' | Report | Bale 9'; Boyce 90' (o.g.) | Stadium: DW Stadium; Attendance: 22,326; Referee: Martin Atkinson |

| 4 May 2013 35 | West Bromwich Albion | 2–3 | Wigan Athletic | West Bromwich |
| 15:00 BST | Long 29'; McAuley 50' | report | Koné 39'; McArthur 58'; McManaman 80' | Stadium: The Hawthorns; Attendance: 25,756; Referee: Lee Probert |

| 7 May 2013 36 | Wigan Athletic | 2–3 | Swansea City | Wigan |
| 19:45 BST | Espinoza 45'; McCarthy 53' | Report | Rangel 50'; Shechter 59'; Tiendalli 76' | Stadium: DW Stadium; Attendance: 18,550; Referee: Kevin Friend |

| 14 May 2013 37 | Arsenal | 4–1 | Wigan Athletic | London |
| 19:45 BST | Podolski 11', 68'; Walcott 63'; Ramsey 71' | Report | Maloney 41' | Stadium: Emirates Stadium; Attendance: 60,068; Referee: Mike Dean |

| 19 May 2013 38 | Wigan Athletic | 2–2 | Aston Villa | Wigan |
| 16:00 BST | Boyce 21'; Baker 45' (o.g.) | Report | Bent 5'; Vlarr 61' | Stadium: DW Stadium; Attendance: 23,001; Referee: Neil Swarbrick |

==== Results by round ====
| Round | 1 | 2 | 3 | 4 | 5 | 6 | 7 | 8 | 9 | 10 | 11 | 12 | 13 | 14 | 15 | 16 | 17 | 18 | 19 | 20 | 21 | 22 | 23 | 24 | 25 | 26 | 27 | 28 | 29 | 30 | 31 | 32 | 33 | 34 | 35 | 36 | 37 | 38 |
|---|---|---|---|---|---|---|---|---|---|---|---|---|---|---|---|---|---|---|---|---|---|---|---|---|---|---|---|---|---|---|---|---|---|---|---|---|---|---|
| Ground | H | A | H | A | H | A | H | A | H | A | H | A | H | H | A | H | A | H | A | A | H | A | H | A | H | A | A | H | H | H | A | A | A | H | A | H | A | H |
| Result | L | W | D | L | L | L | D | L | W | W | L | L | W | L | L | D | L | L | L | W | L | D | L | D | D | L | W | L | W | W | D | L | L | D | W | L | L | D |
| Position | 17 | 8 | 9 | 13 | 15 | 16 | 15 | 16 | 15 | 13 | 14 | 16 | 15 | 15 | 16 | 17 | 18 | 18 | 18 | 16 | 18 | 17 | 19 | 18 | 18 | 18 | 17 | 17 | 18 | 17 | 18 | 18 | 18 | 18 | 18 | 18 | 18 | 18 |

Updated to match(es) played on 19 May 2013. Source: Premier League
A = Away; H = Home; W = Win; D = Draw; L = Loss

==== League table ====
| Pos | Team | Pld | W | D | L | GF | GA | GD | Pts | Qualification or relegation |
|---|---|---|---|---|---|---|---|---|---|---|
| 16 | Newcastle United | 38 | 11 | 8 | 19 | 45 | 68 | −23 | 41 | |
| 17 | Sunderland | 38 | 9 | 12 | 17 | 41 | 54 | −13 | 39 | |
| 18 | Wigan Athletic (R) | 38 | 9 | 9 | 20 | 47 | 73 | −26 | 36 | Qualification for the Europa League group stage and relegation to Football League Championship (Note: Wigan Athletic qualified for the Europa League group stage as the 2012–13 FA Cup winners.) |
| 19 | Reading (R) | 38 | 6 | 10 | 22 | 43 | 73 | −30 | 28 | Relegation to Football League Championship |
| 20 | Queens Park Rangers (R) | 38 | 4 | 13 | 21 | 30 | 60 | −30 | 25 | Relegation to Football League Championship |

Source: Barclays Premier League
Rules for classification: 1) Points; 2) Goal difference; 3) Goals scored; 4) Play-offs (only if needed to decide champion, teams for relegation or teams for UEFA competitions).
(R) Relegated

=== FA Cup ===
| 5 January 2013 Third Round | Wigan Athletic | 1–1 | AFC Bournemouth | Wigan |
| 15:00 BST | Gómez 70' | Report | O'Kane 41' | Stadium: DW Stadium; Attendance: 8,199; Referee: Robert Madley |

| 15 January 2013 Third Round Replay | AFC Bournemouth | 0–1 | Wigan Athletic | Bournemouth |
| 19:45 BST | | Report | Boselli 18' | Stadium: Dean Court; Attendance: 8,890; Referee: Jonathan Moss |

| 26 January 2013 Fourth Round | Macclesfield Town | 0–1 | Wigan Athletic | Macclesfield |
| 15:00 BST | | Report | Gómez 7' (pen.) | Stadium: Moss Rose; Attendance: 5,849; Referee: Roger East |

| 17 February 2013 Fifth Round | Huddersfield Town | 1–4 | Wigan Athletic | Huddersfield |
| 15:55 GMT | Novak 62' | Report | McManaman 31'; Koné 40', 89'; McArthur 56' | Stadium: John Smith's Stadium; Attendance: 12,117; Referee: Michael Oliver |

| 9 March 2013 Sixth Round | Everton | 0–3 | Wigan Athletic | Liverpool |
| 12:45 GMT | | Report | Figueroa 30'; McManaman 31'; Gómez 33' | Stadium: Goodison Park; Attendance: 35,068; Referee: Kevin Friend |

| 13 April 2013 Semi-Final | Millwall | 0–2 | Wigan Athletic | London |
| 17:15 BST | | Report | Maloney 25'; McManaman 78' | Stadium: Wembley Stadium; Attendance: 62,335; Referee: Michael Oliver |

| 11 May 2013 Final | Manchester City | 0–1 | Wigan Athletic | London |
| 17:15 BST | Zabaleta (yellow card) 60' (yellow-red card) 84'; Nastasić (yellow card) 75'; Barry (yellow card) 87' | Report | Watson 90+1'; Robles (yellow card) 90+3' | Stadium: Wembley Stadium; Attendance: 86,254; Referee: Andre Marriner |

=== League Cup ===
| 28 August 2012 Second round | Nottingham Forest | 1–4 | Wigan Athletic | Nottingham |
| 19:45 BST | Cox 47' | Report | Boselli 26'; Figueroa 35'; Gómez 44'; McManaman 89' | Stadium: City Ground; Attendance: 7,545; Referee: Geoff Eltrigham |

| 25 September 2012 Third round | West Ham United | 1–4 | Wigan Athletic | London |
| 19:45 BST | Maïga 7' | Report | Boselli 14', 41'; Ramis 38'; Gómez 84' | Stadium: The Boleyn Ground; Attendance: 25,934; Referee: Craig Pawson |

| 30 October 2012 Fourth round | Wigan Athletic | 0–0 (a.e.t.) (2–4 p) | Bradford City | Wigan |
| 19:45 BST | | Report | | Stadium: DW Stadium; Attendance: 11,777; Referee: Roger East |
| | Penalties |
| | Jones (penalty scored); Watson (penalty scored); Maloney (penalty missed); Gómez (penalty missed) | | Doyle (penalty scored); G. Jones (penalty scored); Darby (penalty scored); Connell (penalty scored) |

== Squad statistics ==
=== Squad ===
As of 19 May 2013

| No. | Pos | Nat | Player | Total | | Premier League | | FA Cup | | League Cup | |
| No. | Pos | Nat | Player | Apps | Goals | Apps | Goals | Apps | Goals | Apps | Goals |
Goalkeepers
| 1 | GK | (Spain) ESP | Joel Robles | 13 | 0 | 9+0 | 0 | 4+0 | 0 | 0+0 | 0 |
| 12 | GK | (England) ENG | Mike Pollitt | 2 | 0 | 0+0 | 0 | 2+0 | 0 | 0+0 | 0 |
| 13 | GK | (England) ENG | Lee Nicholls | 0 | 0 | 0+0 | 0 | 0+0 | 0 | 0+0 | 0 |
| 26 | GK | (Oman) OMA | Ali Al-Habsi | 34 | 0 | 29+0 | 0 | 1+1 | 0 | 3+0 | 0 |
Defenders
| 3 | DF | (Paraguay) PAR | Antolín Alcaraz | 14 | 0 | 8+2 | 0 | 3+0 | 0 | 1+0 | 0 |
| 5 | DF | (Scotland) SCO | Gary Caldwell | 26 | 1 | 25+0 | 1 | 0+0 | 0 | 1+0 | 0 |
| 17 | DF | (Barbados) BRB | Emmerson Boyce | 41 | 4 | 36+0 | 4 | 5+0 | 0 | 0+0 | 0 |
| 21 | DF | (Spain) ESP | Iván Ramis | 19 | 3 | 16+0 | 2 | 0+0 | 0 | 3+0 | 1 |
| 23 | DF | (Netherlands) NED | Ronnie Stam | 24 | 0 | 11+6 | 0 | 4+0 | 0 | 3+0 | 0 |
| 24 | DF | (Spain) ESP | Adrián López | 8 | 0 | 3+2 | 0 | 0+1 | 0 | 2+0 | 0 |
| 25 | DF | (Spain) ESP | Román Golobart | 9 | 0 | 3+1 | 0 | 4+1 | 0 | 0+0 | 0 |
| 27 | DF | (England) ENG | Jordan Mustoe | 2 | 0 | 0+0 | 0 | 1+1 | 0 | 0+0 | 0 |
| 30 | DF | (Republic of Ireland) IRL | Rob Kiernan | 0 | 0 | 0+0 | 0 | 0+0 | 0 | 0+0 | 0 |
| 31 | DF | (Honduras) HON | Maynor Figueroa | 41 | 3 | 33+0 | 1 | 6+0 | 1 | 2+0 | 1 |
| 33 | DF | (Austria) AUT | Paul Scharner | 18 | 0 | 14+0 | 0 | 4+0 | 0 | 0+0 | 0 |
Midfielders
| 4 | MF | (Republic of Ireland) IRL | James McCarthy | 42 | 3 | 38+0 | 3 | 3+1 | 0 | 0+0 | 0 |
| 6 | MF | (England) ENG | David Jones | 18 | 0 | 8+5 | 0 | 1+1 | 0 | 3+0 | 0 |
| 7 | MF | (Spain) ESP | Albert Crusat | 1 | 0 | 0+0 | 0 | 0+0 | 0 | 1+0 | 0 |
| 8 | MF | (England) ENG | Ben Watson | 14 | 2 | 7+4 | 1 | 0+1 | 1 | 2+0 | 0 |
| 10 | MF | (Scotland) SCO | Shaun Maloney | 41 | 7 | 34+2 | 6 | 3+1 | 1 | 0+1 | 0 |
| 14 | MF | (Spain) ESP | Jordi Gómez | 42 | 8 | 17+15 | 3 | 7+0 | 3 | 2+1 | 2 |
| 16 | MF | (Scotland) SCO | James McArthur | 40 | 4 | 24+10 | 3 | 2+3 | 1 | 1+0 | 0 |
| 18 | MF | (Honduras) HON | Roger Espinoza | 16 | 1 | 6+6 | 1 | 4+0 | 0 | 0+0 | 0 |
| 20 | MF | (Scotland) SCO | Fraser Fyvie | 8 | 0 | 0+1 | 0 | 4+0 | 0 | 1+2 | 0 |
| 22 | MF | (Chile) CHI | Jean Beausejour | 39 | 1 | 32+2 | 1 | 2+1 | 0 | 1+1 | 0 |
| 28 | MF | (England) ENG | Daniel Redmond | 2 | 0 | 0+0 | 0 | 1+0 | 0 | 1+0 | 0 |
| 32 | MF | (Japan) JPN | Ryo Miyaichi | 8 | 0 | 0+4 | 0 | 1+1 | 0 | 1+1 | 0 |
Attackers
| 2 | FW | (Ivory Coast) CIV | Arouna Koné | 38 | 13 | 32+2 | 11 | 4+0 | 2 | 0+0 | 0 |
| 9 | FW | (Argentina) ARG | Franco Di Santo | 33 | 5 | 24+9 | 5 | 0+0 | 0 | 0+0 | 0 |
| 11 | FW | (Nigeria) NGR | Victor Moses | 1 | 0 | 1+0 | 0 | 0+0 | 0 | 0+0 | 0 |
| 11 | FW | (Chile) CHI | Ángelo Henríquez | 7 | 1 | 0+3 | 1 | 2+2 | 0 | 0+0 | 0 |
| 15 | FW | (England) ENG | Callum McManaman | 30 | 5 | 8+12 | 2 | 7+0 | 2 | 2+1 | 1 |
| 19 | FW | (Argentina) ARG | Mauro Boselli | 12 | 4 | 1+6 | 0 | 2+0 | 1 | 3+0 | 3 |
| 29 | FW | (France) FRA | Nouha Dicko | 3 | 0 | 0+0 | 0 | 1+2 | 0 | 0+0 | 0 |
| 35 | FW | (Slovakia) SVK | Filip Oršula | 2 | 0 | 0+0 | 0 | 0+0 | 0 | 0+2 | 0 |

=== Top scorers ===
As of 19 May 2013

| Number | Nationality | Position | Name | Premier League | FA Cup | League Cup | Total |
|---|---|---|---|---|---|---|---|
| 2 | (Ivory Coast) | FW | Arouna Koné | 11 | 2 | 0 | 13 |
| 14 | (Spain) | MF | Jordi Gómez | 3 | 3 | 2 | 8 |
| 15 | (England) | FW | Callum McManaman | 2 | 3 | 1 | 6 |
| 10 | (Scotland) | MF | Shaun Maloney | 6 | 1 | 0 | 6 |
| 9 | (Argentina) | FW | Franco Di Santo | 5 | 0 | 0 | 5 |
| 19 | (Argentina) | FW | Mauro Boselli | 0 | 1 | 3 | 4 |
| 16 | (Scotland) | MF | James McArthur | 3 | 1 | 0 | 4 |
| 17 | (Barbados) | DF | Emmerson Boyce | 4 | 0 | 0 | 4 |
| 4 | (Republic of Ireland) | MF | James McCarthy | 3 | 0 | 0 | 3 |
| 21 | (Spain) | DF | Iván Ramis | 2 | 0 | 1 | 3 |
| 31 | (Honduras) | DF | Maynor Figueroa | 1 | 1 | 1 | 3 |
| 8 | (England) | MF | Ben Watson | 1 | 1 | 0 | 2 |
| 11 | (Chile) | FW | Ángelo Henríquez | 1 | 0 | 0 | 1 |
| 5 | (Scotland) | DF | Gary Caldwell | 1 | 0 | 0 | 1 |
| 22 | (Chile) | MF | Jean Beausejour | 1 | 0 | 0 | 1 |
| 18 | (Honduras) | MF | Roger Espinoza | 1 | 0 | 0 | 1 |
| Own goals | | | | 2 | 0 | 0 | 2 |
| Totals | | | | 46 | 13 | 8 | 65 |

=== Disciplinary record ===
Includes all competitive matches.

Last updated 19 May 2013

| Number | Nationality | Position | Name | Premier League | | FA Cup | | League Cup | | Total | |
| Number | Nationality | Position | Name | Booked | Sent off (straight red) | Booked | Sent off (straight red) | Booked | Sent off (straight red) | Booked | Sent off (straight red) |
| 31 | (Honduras) | DF | Maynor Figueroa | 6 | 1 | 1 | 0 | 0 | 0 | 6 | 1 |
| 3 | (Paraguay) | DF | Antolín Alcaraz | 1 | 0 | 0 | 0 | 1 | 1 | 2 | 1 |
| 5 | (Scotland) | DF | Gary Caldwell | 7 | 0 | 0 | 0 | 1 | 0 | 8 | 0 |
| 16 | (Scotland) | MF | James McArthur | 7 | 0 | 0 | 0 | 0 | 0 | 7 | 0 |
| 9 | (Republic of Ireland) | MF | James McCarthy | 7 | 0 | 0 | 0 | 0 | 0 | 7 | 0 |
| 10 | (Scotland) | MF | Shaun Maloney | 5 | 0 | 1 | 0 | 0 | 0 | 6 | 0 |
| 33 | (Austria) | DF | Paul Scharner | 5 | 0 | 0 | 0 | 0 | 0 | 5 | 0 |
| 14 | (Spain) | MF | Jordi Gómez | 5 | 0 | 0 | 0 | 0 | 0 | 5 | 0 |
| 17 | (Barbados) | DF | Emmerson Boyce | 5 | 0 | 0 | 0 | 0 | 0 | 5 | 0 |
| 22 | (Chile) | MF | Jean Beausejour | 4 | 0 | 0 | 0 | 0 | 0 | 4 | 0 |
| 4 | (Argentina) | FW | Franco Di Santo | 4 | 0 | 0 | 0 | 0 | 0 | 4 | 0 |
| 18 | (Honduras) | MF | Roger Espinoza | 0 | 0 | 3 | 0 | 0 | 0 | 3 | 0 |
| 24 | (Spain) | DF | Adrián López | 1 | 0 | 0 | 0 | 1 | 0 | 2 | 0 |
| 6 | (England) | MF | David Jones | 1 | 0 | 0 | 0 | 1 | 0 | 2 | 0 |
| 23 | (Chile) | FW | Ángelo Henríquez | 1 | 0 | 1 | 0 | 0 | 0 | 2 | 0 |
| 8 | (England) | MF | Ben Watson | 1 | 0 | 1 | 0 | 0 | 0 | 2 | 0 |
| 11 | (Netherlands) | MF | Ronnie Stam | 0 | 0 | 1 | 0 | 0 | 0 | 1 | 0 |
| 15 | (England) | FW | Callum McManaman | 0 | 0 | 1 | 0 | 0 | 0 | 1 | 0 |
| 27 | (England) | DF | Jordan Mustoe | 0 | 0 | 1 | 0 | 0 | 0 | 1 | 0 |
| 25 | (Spain) | DF | Román Golobart | 0 | 0 | 1 | 0 | 0 | 0 | 1 | 0 |
| 1 | (Spain) | GK | Joel Robles | 0 | 0 | 1 | 0 | 0 | 0 | 1 | 0 |
| | | | TOTALS | 60 | 1 | 12 | 0 | 4 | 1 | 73 | 2 |
