= James McCarthy (footballer) =

Scottish-Irish footballer (born 1990)

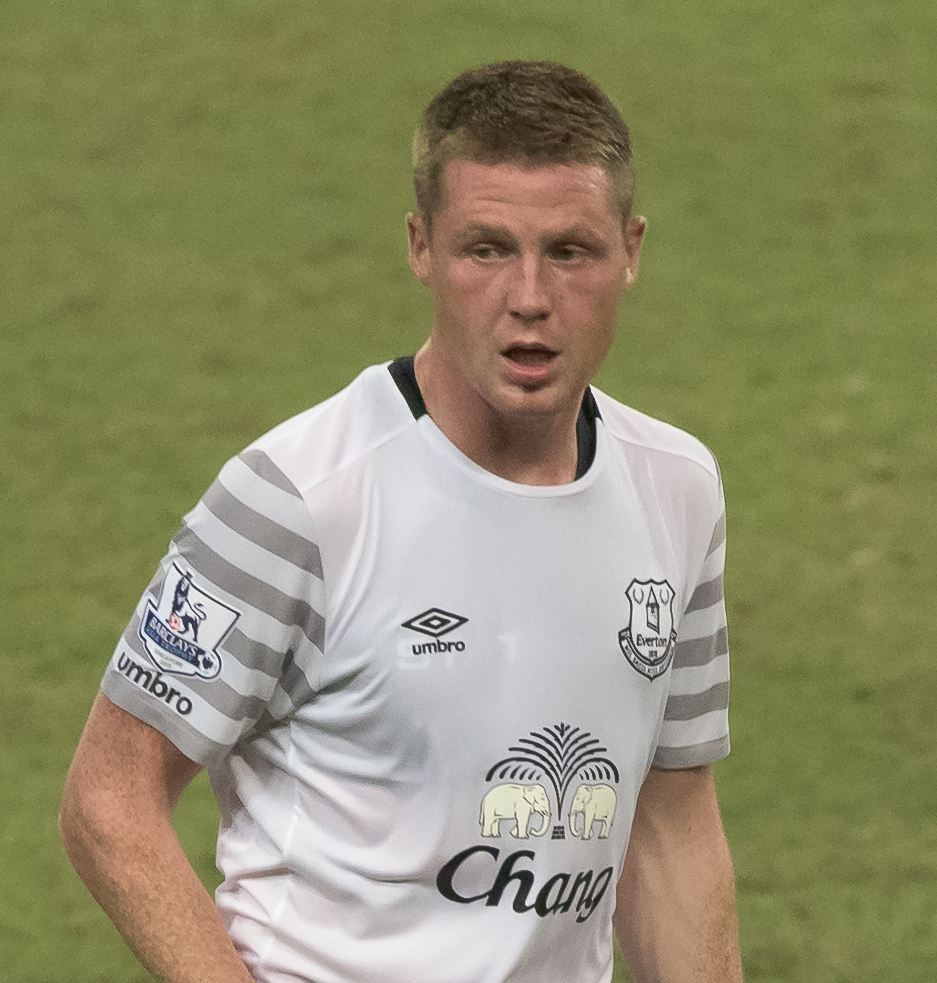
- McCarthy with Everton in 2015

Personal information
- Full name: James Patrick McCarthy
- Date of birth: 12 November 1990 (age 36)
- Place of birth: Glasgow, Scotland
- Height: 1.80 m (5 ft 11 in)
- Position: Central midfielder

Youth career
- –2006: Hamilton Academical

Senior career*
| Years | Team | Apps | (Gls) |
| 2006–2009 | Hamilton Academical | 95 | (13) |
| 2009–2013 | Wigan Athletic | 120 | (7) |
| 2013–2019 | Everton | 108 | (6) |
| 2019–2021 | Crystal Palace | 49 | (0) |
| 2021–2024 | Celtic | 12 | (0) |
| Total | | 384 | (26) |

International career
| 2007 | Republic of Ireland U17 | 3 | (1) |
| 2007 | Republic of Ireland U18 | 2 | (2) |
| 2007–2008 | Republic of Ireland U19 | 2 | (0) |
| 2008–2011 | Republic of Ireland U21 | 7 | (1) |
| 2010–2020 | Republic of Ireland | 43 | (0) |
- * Club domestic league appearances and goals

James Patrick McCarthy (born 12 November 1990) is a former professional footballer who played as a midfielder.

McCarthy made over 100 appearances for Hamilton Academical as a teenager, before being transferred to Wigan Athletic in 2009 for an initial £1.2 million which was a record sale fee for Hamilton Academical. After winning the FA Cup with Wigan in 2013 he moved to Everton, suffering from various injuries including a broken leg in 2018 which ruled him out for over a year.

Born and raised in Scotland, McCarthy elected to represent the Republic of Ireland at international level and made his competitive debut for their senior team on 26 March 2011 in a UEFA Euro 2012 qualifier against Macedonia. He was included in the Irish squad at UEFA Euro 2016.

== Early life ==
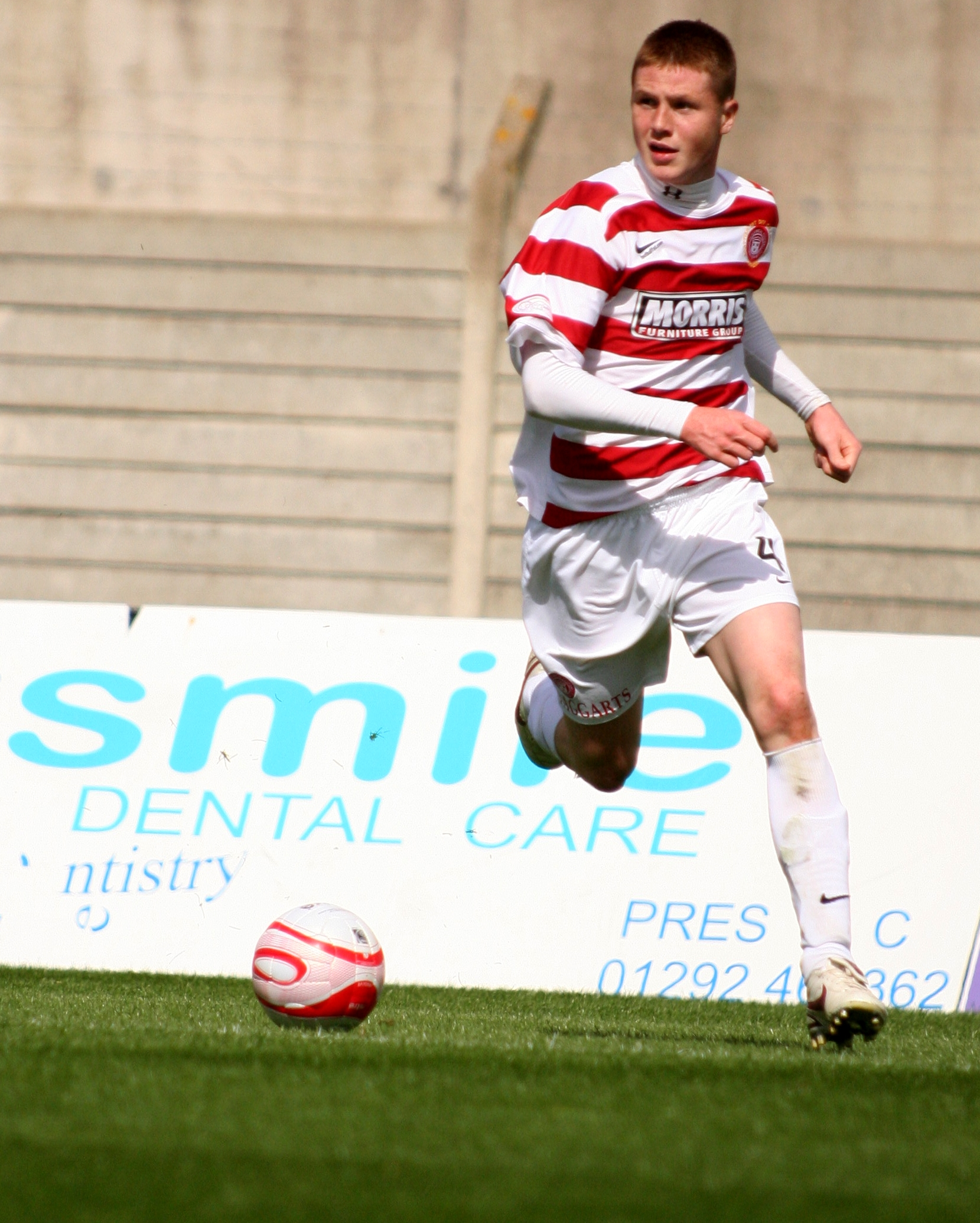
McCarthy playing for Hamilton Academical in 2009

McCarthy was born and raised in Glasgow, Scotland. He is the youngest child of Willie and Marie McCarthy and is of Irish ancestry through his grandfather from County Donegal (although the McCarthy surname originates in Munster). A former student of St Margaret Mary's Secondary School in Castlemilk, he grew up supporting Celtic and tried out for their youth teams, but was turned down due to the large number of players the club had already taken on.

== Club career ==
=== Hamilton Academical ===
McCarthy made his debut for Hamilton Academical against Queen of the South as a substitute on 30 September 2006, becoming the youngest player to play for Hamilton in the 21st century. His full debut came against Airdrie United on 11 November 2006, a day before his 16th birthday. On 6 January 2007, at 16 years and 55 days old, McCarthy became the youngest player ever to score in Hamilton Academical's history when he scored in a Scottish Cup defeat against Livingston. McCarthy is still closely affiliated with his first professional club. He was pictured promoting the club's third jersey for its 150th anniversary in 2025.

On 17 May 2008, after a season which saw his club promoted to the Scottish Premier League, McCarthy signed a new three-year contract with the club. He won the SPFA Young Player of the Year award for the 2008–09 season.

=== Wigan Athletic ===
Hamilton accepted a bid for McCarthy from Wigan Athletic on 16 July 2009. He completed the move to Wigan on 21 July, on a five-year deal, believed to be worth just under £1.2 million. The fee could have risen to £3 million depending on appearances. McCarthy made his debut for Wigan on 22 August 2009, as a 74th-minute substitute in a 5–0 defeat to Manchester United. He scored his first goal for Wigan in the FA Cup third round victory against fellow Premier League team Hull City on 2 January 2010, and marked his first Premier League start with a goal in a 2–0 victory away to Wolverhampton Wanderers on 16 January 2010. He was later joined in the Wigan midfield by former Hamilton teammate James McArthur.

After an impressive start to the 2010–11 season, he picked up a serious ankle injury against Bolton Wanderers on 23 October 2010, keeping him out of action for three months. He scored on his return to the line-up against Aston Villa on 25 January 2011. On 5 February 2011, McCarthy scored twice in a 4–3 victory against Blackburn Rovers.

In August 2012, McCarthy signed a new five-year contract at the club. He was part of the Wigan Athletic team that overcame Manchester City in the 2013 FA Cup Final; afterwards he hailed manager Roberto Martínez as "a tactical genius".

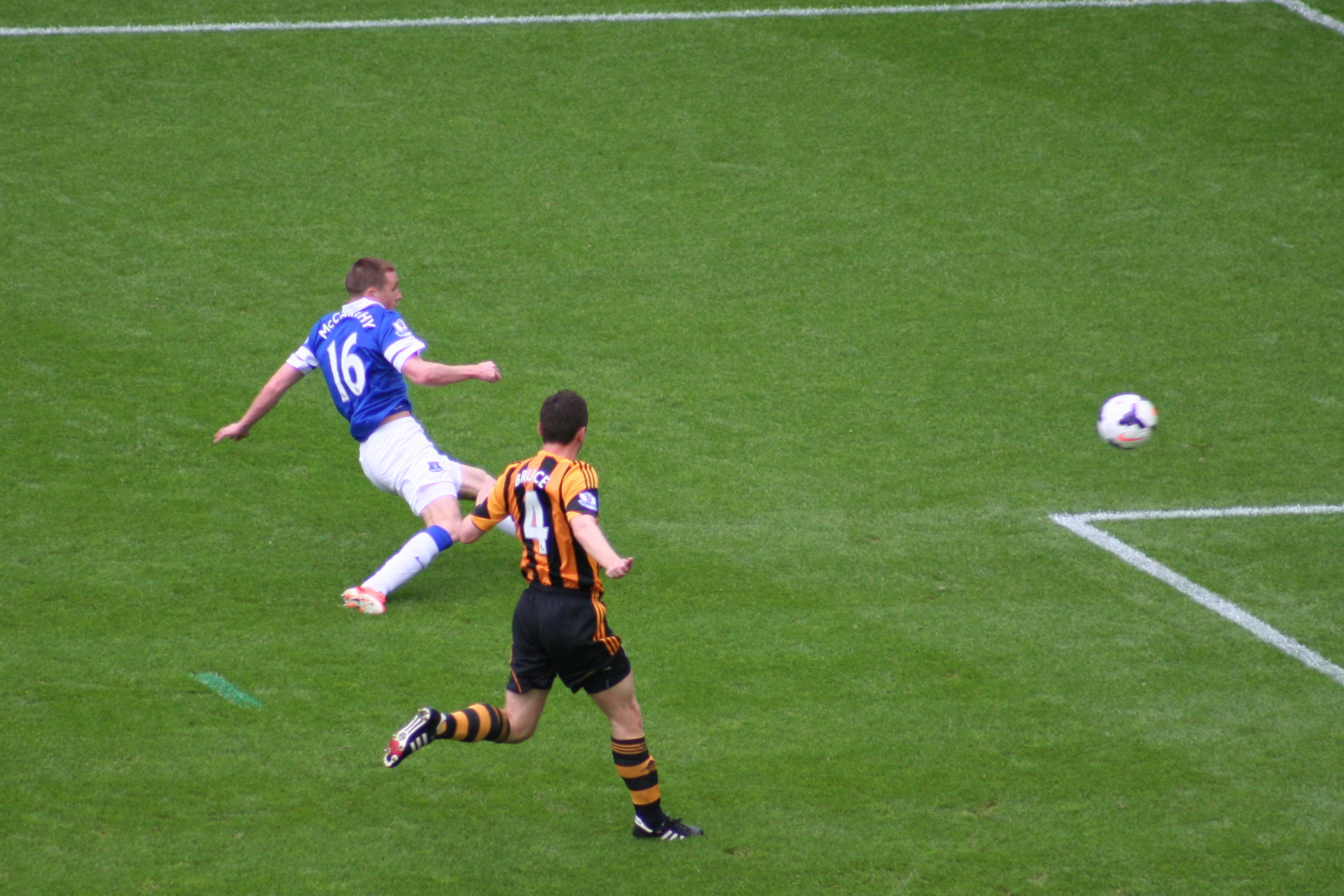
McCarthy scoring his first goal for Everton in 2014

=== Everton ===
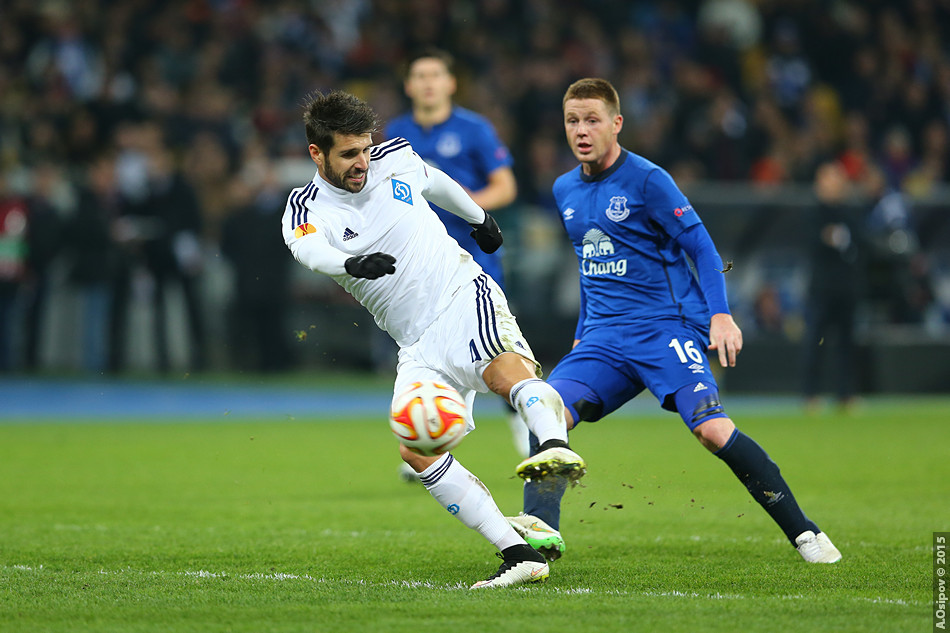
McCarthy in action for Everton in the Europa League

On 2 September 2013, McCarthy rejoined former Wigan manager Roberto Martínez at Everton, signing a long-term deal worth £13m to become the club's second most expensive player in their history; due to a clause in his Wigan contract, his former club Hamilton received a sell-on fee from the Everton transfer, which they used to invest in the youth system through which the player had emerged. He forged a partnership with Gareth Barry which was a key factor in Everton amassing 72 points during the campaign, a club record in the Premier League. Martínez claimed that McCarthy's performances had been so impressive that his transfer value had doubled during his first season. McCarthy had to wait until the last game of the season to score his first goal for the club when he netted the opener in a 2–0 win over Hull City.

On 15 March 2015, McCarthy scored his first goal of the 2014–15 season in a 3–0 home win against Newcastle United. He scored his second goal of the season in a 3–0 defeat of Manchester United at Goodison Park on 26 April.

McCarthy scored his first league goal for Everton in the 2016–17 season against Bournemouth at Goodison Park in a 6–3 victory on 4 February 2017. Earlier that day, he had provided an assist to Romelu Lukaku, allowing Lukaku to score the fastest Everton Premier League goal of all time. McCarthy eventually missed the rest of season due to a hamstring injury he had sustained whilst on international duty in March 2017; Everton manager Ronald Koeman expressed his displeasure at Republic of Ireland manager Martin O'Neill selecting a half-fit McCarthy repeatedly, which had aggravated existing hamstring issues.

On 20 January 2018, McCarthy suffered a broken leg (tibia and fibula) in an attempt to block a shot on goal by West Bromwich Albion's Salomón Rondón, resulting in the striker accidentally kicking McCarthy's lower leg causing it to fracture. Rondón was visibly upset by the incident and also became emotional when recalling it in an interview some months later. McCarthy was ruled out for the rest of the 2017–18 season, and only made one further senior appearance for Everton, coming off the bench for the last 15 minutes of a home league fixture against Manchester United in April 2019, at which point his team were already 4–0 ahead.

=== Crystal Palace ===
On 7 August 2019, Crystal Palace signed McCarthy from Everton for an undisclosed fee. He made his debut as a 70th-minute substitute for Andros Townsend in an away 1–0 defeat to Sheffield United on 18 August. He received a yellow card for retaliation four minutes later. The move allowed McCarthy to resume his midfield partnership with James McArthur for much of the next two seasons.

=== Celtic ===
On 3 August 2021, McCarthy joined Celtic Football Club on a four-year deal alongside English goalkeeper Joe Hart, fulfilling his dream of playing for the club he supported as a boy. However, his time at Celtic was hampered by persistent injury problems and struggles with fitness, which limited his club appearances to just 27 games. Despite being part of the squad during successful domestic campaigns under manager Ange Postecoglou, McCarthy was unable to make a significant impact. His last first team appearance was 19 October 2022 from off the bench in the Premier Sports Cup quarter final against Motherwell, where Celtic won away from home 4–0. After being sidelined for a year with a hamstring injury, McCarthy made a few appearances for the Celtic B team during Brendan Rodgers's second tenure as Celtic manager but never got the call up back to the first team. In August 2024, his contract was mutually terminated, bringing an end to a challenging spell at the club without him establishing himself as a key player.

== International career ==
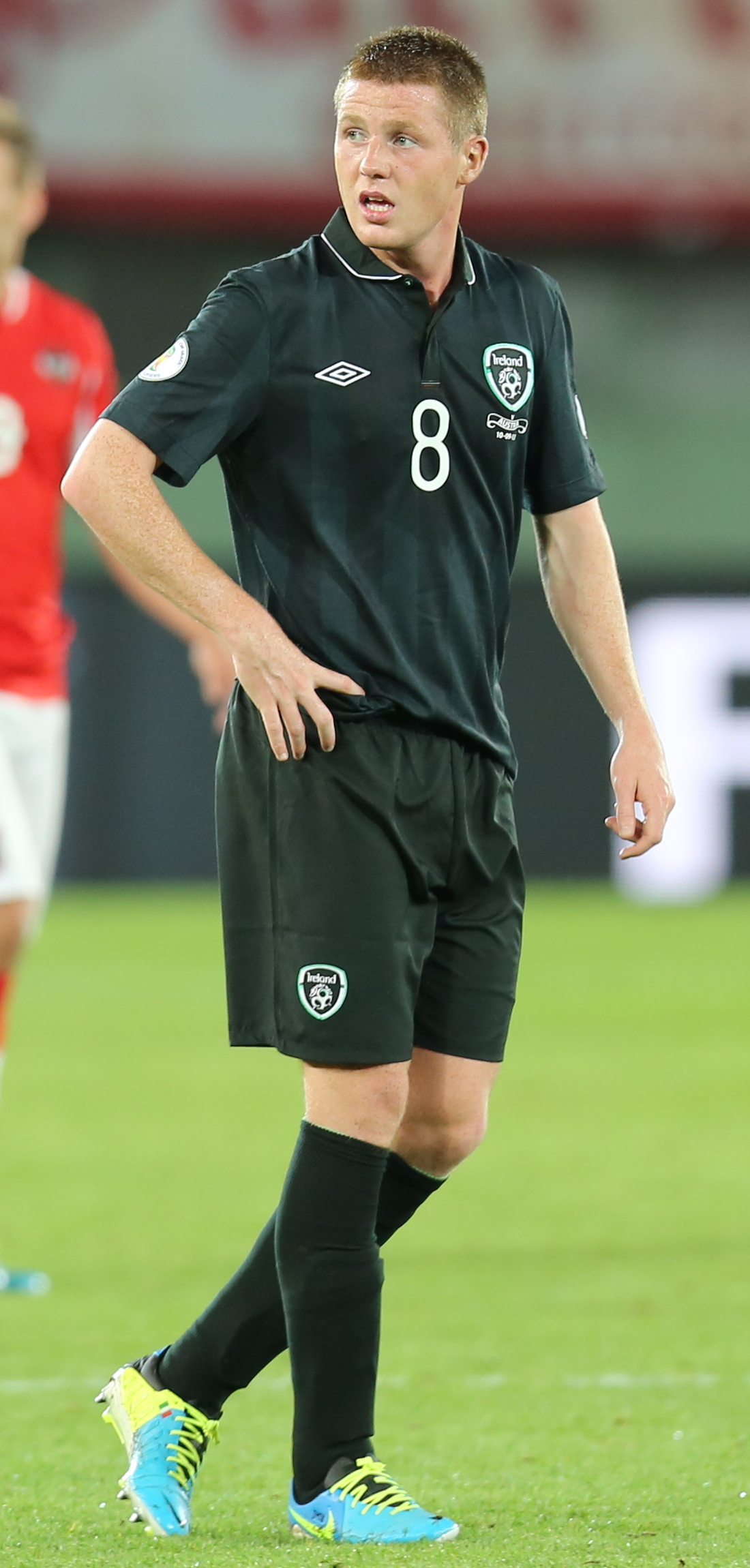
McCarthy playing for the Republic of Ireland in 2013

=== Early years ===
At the age of sixteen, McCarthy accepted an invitation to play for the Republic of Ireland. He was eligible because his grandfather, Paddy Coyle, was born in The Rosses, County Donegal. However, McCarthy also stated that he would have played for Scotland if they had offered him an international call-up first. Despite multiple attempts to persuade McCarthy to switch his allegiance to the country of his birth, he reaffirmed his decision to play for the Republic of Ireland.

McCarthy made his international debut for the Republic of Ireland Under-17s in January 2007 against Italy. He scored his first goal against Greece when winning his third cap in March of the same year. He was quickly promoted to the Under-18s and played his first game at that level versus Germany in November 2007. He scored twice in the return game that same month. McCarthy played one game for the Under-19s in September 2007 against Portugal. and was subsequently selected for a number of these squads in 2008. McCarthy came on as a half time substitute for the Republic of Ireland Under-21s in their European Championship qualifier on 31 March against Turkey. McCarthy made an instant impression, creating opportunities for the lone striker, as well as making many intelligent runs in behind the Turkish defence.

=== Senior team ===
McCarthy received his first call-up to the Republic of Ireland national squad in February 2010, for a friendly with Brazil played in London. He made his debut as a substitute, replacing Stoke City's Liam Lawrence after 70 minutes. McCarthy withdrew from the Ireland squad for their 2011 Nations Cup match against Wales. This led to media speculation that McCarthy may switch his allegiance to Scotland, as his appearance in the friendly against Brazil did not tie him to Ireland under the present rules. The speculation was fuelled by Wigan manager Roberto Martínez who insisted that McCarthy was still considering his international future, even after McCarthy and Giovanni Trapattoni had a face to face meeting in which McCarthy reportedly confirmed his commitment to Ireland.

The question of McCarthy's international allegiance was finally resolved in March 2011 after he accepted a call-up for Ireland's Euro 2012 qualification match against Macedonia, in which he came off the bench replacing Robbie Keane to earn his first competitive cap, rendering him ineligible to play for Scotland. On 4 May 2011, McCarthy was called into the Irish squad for the games against Northern Ireland and Scotland. He reportedly went "AWOL" after not showing up for training. Later Martínez, the Wigan manager, came out and said he will be out "for at least four weeks".

On 7 May 2012, Giovanni Trapattoni confirmed that McCarthy had asked to be withdrawn from consideration for the Irish UEFA Euro 2012 squad following his father's diagnosis with cancer.

McCarthy played in nine of the ten matches in Ireland's unsuccessful 2014 World Cup qualifying campaign picking up the man of the match awards against the Faroe Islands and Sweden.

He was selected for the Ireland squad for UEFA Euro 2016 and started all four of his nation's matches at the tournament.

== Career statistics ==
=== Club ===
As of match played 19 October 2022

Appearances and goals by club, season and competition
| Club | Season | League | | | National cup (Note: Includes Scottish Cup, FA Cup) | | League cup (Note: Includes Scottish League Cup, Football League/EFL Cup) | | Other | | Total | |
| Club | Season | Division | Apps | Goals | Apps | Goals | Apps | Goals | Apps | Goals | Apps | Goals |
|---|---|---|---|---|---|---|---|---|---|---|---|---|
| Hamilton Academical | 2006–07 | Scottish First Division | 23 | 1 | 1 | 1 | 0 | 0 | 0 | 0 | 24 | 2 |
| Hamilton Academical | 2007–08 | Scottish First Division | 35 | 6 | 2 | 0 | 5 | 1 | 1 (Note: Appearance in Scottish Challenge Cup) | 0 | 43 | 7 |
| Hamilton Academical | 2008–09 | Scottish Premier League | 37 | 6 | 3 | 0 | 3 | 0 | — | | 43 | 6 |
| Hamilton Academical | Total | | 95 | 13 | 6 | 1 | 8 | 1 | 1 | 0 | 110 | 15 |
| Wigan Athletic | 2009–10 | Premier League | 20 | 1 | 3 | 1 | 1 | 0 | — | | 24 | 2 |
| Wigan Athletic | 2010–11 | Premier League | 24 | 3 | 1 | 0 | 2 | 0 | — | | 27 | 3 |
| Wigan Athletic | 2011–12 | Premier League | 33 | 0 | 0 | 0 | 1 | 0 | — | | 34 | 0 |
| Wigan Athletic | 2012–13 | Premier League | 38 | 3 | 4 | 0 | 0 | 0 | — | | 42 | 3 |
| Wigan Athletic | 2013–14 | Championship | 5 | 0 | — | | — | | 1 (Note: Appearance in FA Community Shield) | 0 | 6 | 0 |
| Wigan Athletic | Total | | 120 | 7 | 8 | 1 | 4 | 0 | 1 | 0 | 133 | 8 |
| Everton | 2013–14 | Premier League | 34 | 1 | 4 | 0 | 1 | 0 | — | | 39 | 1 |
| Everton | 2014–15 | Premier League | 28 | 2 | 0 | 0 | 1 | 0 | 8 (Note: Appearances in UEFA Europa League) | 0 | 37 | 2 |
| Everton | 2015–16 | Premier League | 29 | 2 | 4 | 0 | 4 | 0 | — | | 37 | 2 |
| Everton | 2016–17 | Premier League | 12 | 1 | 0 | 0 | 1 | 0 | — | | 13 | 1 |
| Everton | 2017–18 | Premier League | 4 | 0 | 1 | 0 | 1 | 0 | 0 | 0 | 6 | 0 |
| Everton | 2018–19 | Premier League | 1 | 0 | 0 | 0 | 0 | 0 | — | | 1 | 0 |
| Everton | Total | | 108 | 6 | 9 | 0 | 8 | 0 | 8 | 0 | 133 | 6 |
| Crystal Palace | 2019–20 | Premier League | 33 | 0 | 1 | 0 | 1 | 0 | — | | 35 | 0 |
| Crystal Palace | 2020–21 | Premier League | 16 | 0 | 1 | 0 | 0 | 0 | — | | 17 | 0 |
| Crystal Palace | Total | | 49 | 0 | 2 | 0 | 1 | 0 | — | | 52 | 0 |
| Celtic | 2021–22 | Scottish Premiership | 10 | 0 | 2 | 0 | 3 | 0 | 7 | 0 | 22 | 0 |
| Celtic | 2022–23 | Scottish Premiership | 2 | 0 | 0 | 0 | 2 | 0 | 1 (Note: Appearance in UEFA Champions League) | 0 | 5 | 0 |
| Celtic | Total | | 12 | 0 | 2 | 0 | 5 | 0 | 8 | 0 | 27 | 0 |
| Career total | | | 384 | 26 | 27 | 2 | 26 | 1 | 18 | 0 | 455 | 29 |

=== International ===
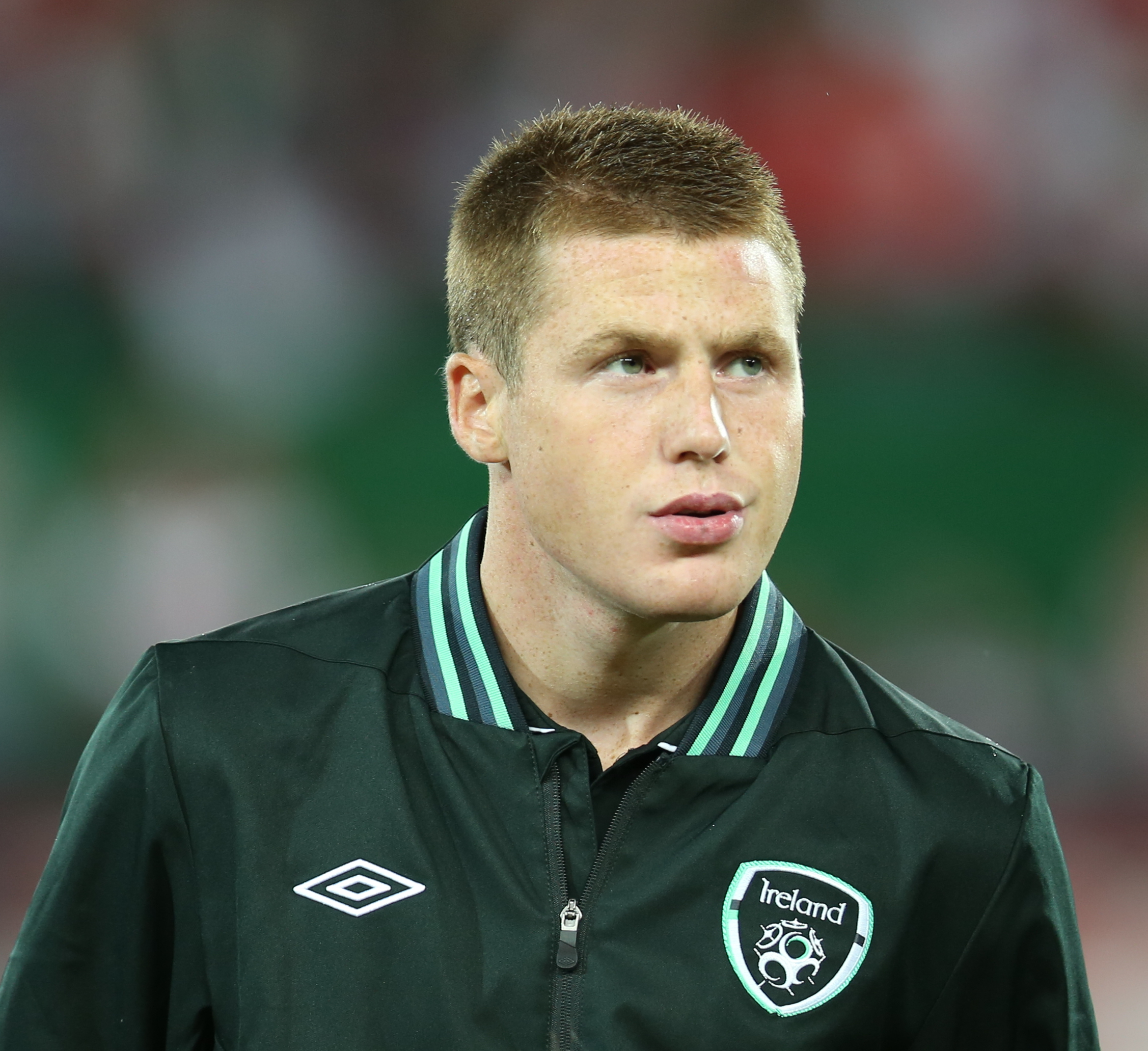
McCarthy, 2013.

As of match played 8 October 2020

Appearances and goals by national team and year
| National team | Year | Apps | Goals |
|---|---|---|---|
| Republic of Ireland | 2010 | 1 | 0 |
| Republic of Ireland | 2011 | 2 | 0 |
| Republic of Ireland | 2012 | 6 | 0 |
| Republic of Ireland | 2013 | 13 | 0 |
| Republic of Ireland | 2014 | 2 | 0 |
| Republic of Ireland | 2015 | 9 | 0 |
| Republic of Ireland | 2016 | 8 | 0 |
| Republic of Ireland | 2020 | 2 | 0 |
| Total | | 43 | 0 |

== Honours ==
Hamilton Academical

- Scottish Football League First Division: 2007–08

Wigan Athletic

- FA Cup: 2012–13

Celtic

- Scottish Premiership: 2021–22, 2022–23
- Scottish League Cup: 2021–22, 2022–23

Individual

- SFL Young Player of the Month: October 2007
- Scottish Football League Young Player of the Year: 2007–08
- SPL Young Player of the Month: December 2008, January 2009
- PFA Scotland Young Player of the Year: 2008–09
- FAI Young International Player of the Year: 2012, 2013

== See also ==
- List of Republic of Ireland international footballers born outside the Republic of Ireland
