= Gary Caldwell =

Scottish footballer and coach (born 1982)

- Caldwell in 2026.

Personal information
- Full name: Gary Caldwell
- Date of birth: 12 April 1982 (age 44)
- Place of birth: Stirling, Scotland
- Height: 5 ft 11 in (1.80 m)
- Position: Centre back

Team information
- Current team: Wigan Athletic (head coach)

Youth career
- 1995–1996: Celtic Boys Club
- 1996–1997: Hutchison Vale
- 1997–2001: Newcastle United

Senior career*
Years	Team	Apps	(Gls)
2001–2004	Newcastle United	0	(0)
2001	→ Darlington (loan)	4	(0)
2002	→ Hibernian (loan)	11	(0)
2002–2003	→ Coventry City (loan)	36	(0)
2003	→ Derby County (loan)	9	(0)
2004–2006	Hibernian	88	(5)
2006–2010	Celtic	106	(5)
2010–2015	Wigan Athletic	102	(6)
Total		356	(16)

International career
2001–2003	Scotland U21	19	(2)
2002–2013	Scotland	55	(2)
2002–2003	Scotland B	4	(0)

Managerial career
- 2015–2016: Wigan Athletic
- 2017: Chesterfield
- 2018–2019: Partick Thistle
- 2022–2026: Exeter City
- 2026–: Wigan Athletic
- * Club domestic league appearances and goals

Gary Caldwell (born 12 April 1982) is a Scottish former professional footballer and coach who is the current head coach of EFL League One club Wigan Athletic. Caldwell played for Newcastle United, Darlington, Coventry City, Derby County, Hibernian, Celtic, Wigan Athletic and won 55 international caps for Scotland.

Primarily considered a centre back, Caldwell was a versatile player; he was also deployed as a right back and defensive midfielder at various spells in his career. His elder brother, Steven, was also a footballer and they were at Wigan concurrently. As an international, he earned a place in the Scottish FA International Roll of Honour after gaining over 50 caps.

After retirement he went into coaching, and has managed Wigan Athletic, Chesterfield, Partick Thistle and Exeter City.

== Club career ==
=== Newcastle United ===
Caldwell started his career with Celtic Boys Club. At 16 he went to England, alongside his elder brother Steven at Newcastle United. Breaking through from the reserves proved difficult, however, and in search of first team football, he went on loan to other clubs on several occasions: Darlington and Hibernian in 2001–02, then Coventry and Derby County the following season.

=== Hibernian ===
During the 2003–04 season, Caldwell was given a free transfer by Newcastle. He signed a short-term contract with Hibs for the second half of the season, and during this period he played in their defeat by Livingston in the 2004 League Cup Final. After going on trial with Vitesse Arnhem in the summer of 2004, he signed a two-year contract with Hibs. During the 2005–06 season, rumours circulated that he had signed a pre-contract agreement to join Celtic in the summer of 2006. This prompted Hibs fans to jeer Caldwell when he made a mistake in a game against Aberdeen. After this, the deal was confirmed by Gordon Strachan.

=== Celtic ===
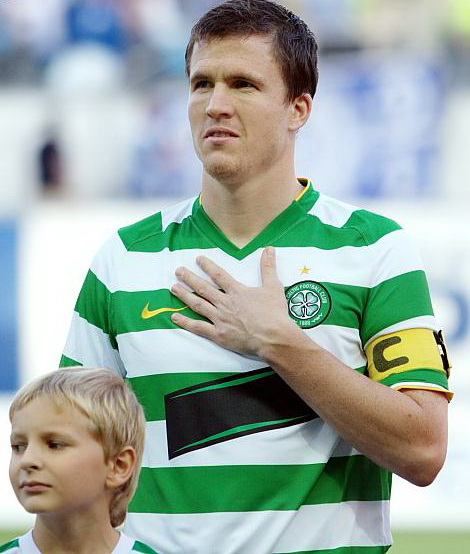
Caldwell lining up for Celtic in 2009.

During four years at Celtic, Caldwell helped the club win two league championships, the 2006–07 Scottish Cup and the 2008–09 Scottish League Cup, although he was subject to criticism from Celtic fans. Caldwell himself later said that this was due to injuries in his first season, and then having to play out of position at right back during the early part of the 2007–08 season (before Andreas Hinkel was signed). He was also criticised during the 2006–07 season for a bad tackle on Kilmarnock player David Fernández, which damaged the Spaniard's cruciate ligament. Caldwell apologised to Fernandez after the game, protesting that he had never intentionally hurt an opponent.

Caldwell subsequently gained recognition and respect from the fans, becoming something of a cult hero, as shown by the chants of "heid" when he was in possession of the football. After being named as the Writers' Player of the Year for the 2008–09 season, Caldwell stated his belief that this was due to him having a long run in his preferred position, and improved concentration and decision making on his part.

During the 2009–10 season, however, Caldwell had a contract dispute with the club, claiming that the club were "kidding themselves" if they thought he would accept their offer. New manager Tony Mowbray, who had also worked with Caldwell at Hibernian, responded by stating that he would not ask the board to increase the offer. Subsequent to this, Middlesbrough had a joint offer for Caldwell and Barry Robson accepted by Celtic.

=== Wigan Athletic ===
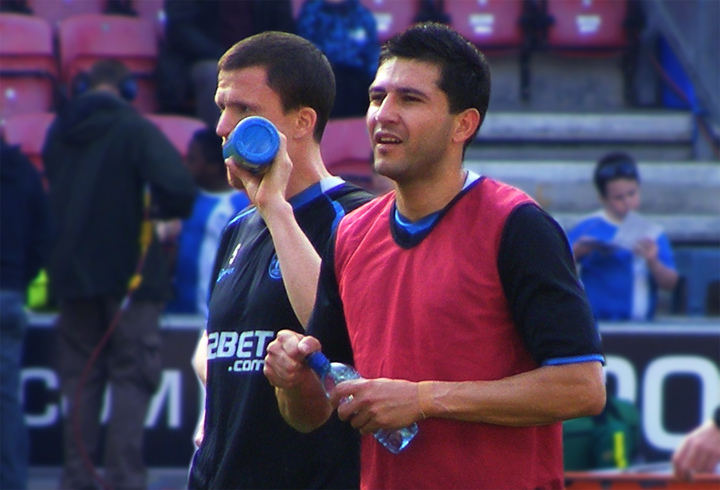
Caldwell (left holding a bottle) taking from warming up during his time at Wigan Athletic.

Caldwell eventually signed for Wigan Athletic on a four-and-a-half-year contract for an undisclosed fee on 13 January 2010. He made his Wigan debut in a 2–0 win against Wolves on 16 January 2010, and scored his first goal for Wigan in a 2–1 defeat to Blackburn Rovers on 27 January. Caldwell was sent off twice in Premier League defeats against Manchester City on 29 March (3–0) and Chelsea on the final day of the 2009–10 season (8–0).

Caldwell was appointed captain of Wigan Athletic early in the 2010–11 season, following the departure of previous captain Mario Melchiot in the summer. In the 2011–12 season, Caldwell was a key player in the club's battle against relegation from the Premier League, and received the club's Player of the Year award at the end of the season. In May 2013 he jointly lifted the FA Cup with playing captain Emerson Boyce after Wigan defeated Manchester City 1–0 in the final. Caldwell returned from injury as a substitute in the 2013–14 FA Cup semi final against Arsenal. The match ended in a 1–1 draw, but Caldwell missed the first attempt in the penalty shootout, which Wigan lost. In the 2013–14 Football League Championship playoff semi final second leg against QPR, Caldwell conceded a penalty kick during a 2–1 defeat that ended Wigan's hopes of promotion.

Caldwell signed a one-year contract with Wigan in July 2014. As part of the new agreement he was also given some coaching responsibilities. He announced his retirement from playing on 28 February 2015 after being unable to recover from a long term hip injury.

== International career ==
Caldwell made his full international debut for Scotland in the first match managed by Berti Vogts, a 5–0 defeat to France at the Stade de France. He scored the only goal of the game as Scotland defeated France 1–0 at Hampden Park, on 7 October 2006 in a Euro 2008 qualifying match. He was sent off, however, in a key 2010 FIFA World Cup qualifying match against Norway. He played alongside his brother Steven in five matches; they were the first siblings to play together for the national team since the 1940s.

== Coaching and managerial career ==
=== Wigan Athletic ===
After retiring as a player in February 2015, Caldwell formally joined the coaching staff at the Wigan Athletic academy. He was appointed the new manager of Wigan Athletic on 7 April 2015 after the dismissal of Malky Mackay with the club 23rd in the Championship with five games remaining.

Caldwell was unable to halt the club's relegation to League One but was assured by club chairman David Sharpe that he would remain in charge. The following season Caldwell guided Wigan to the League One title and promotion back to the Championship at the first attempt. Along with club success Caldwell was also recognised with the manager of the month award for February and the LMA League One Manager of the Year award. On 25 October 2016, after 18 months in charge, Caldwell was dismissed by Wigan, with the club in 23rd position and winless in four games.

=== Chesterfield ===
In 2017, he was appointed manager of League One club Chesterfield on a one-year rolling contract, following the dismissal of Danny Wilson. He was unable to prevent the club being relegated, and was sacked on 16 September after a bad start to the 2017–18 EFL League Two season.

=== Partick Thistle ===
Caldwell was appointed manager of Scottish Championship club Partick Thistle in October 2018. Thistle avoided relegation at the end of the 2018–19 season, but Caldwell was sacked in September 2019 as the club sat second-bottom of the 2019–20 Scottish Championship table.

In 2021 Caldwell was named interim manager of Newcastle United's U23s team. Later that year he joined Manchester City in a role overseeing their players loaned to other clubs. Caldwell re-joined Hibernian as their assistant manager in December 2021, working alongside Shaun Maloney. They were sacked in April 2022, following a Scottish Cup semi-final defeat to Hearts.

=== Exeter City ===
On 24 October 2022, Caldwell was appointed manager of League One club Exeter City. Exeter finished the 2022–23 season in 14th place in League One.

=== Return to Wigan Athletic ===
On 16 February 2026, Caldwell departed Exeter City, returning to Wigan Athletic as head coach.

== Career statistics ==
=== Club ===
Appearances and goals by club, season and competition
Club	Season	League			National cup (Note: Includes Scottish Cup, FA Cup)		League cup (Note: Includes Scottish League Cup, Football League Cup)		Other		Total	
Club	Season	Division	Apps	Goals	Apps	Goals	Apps	Goals	Apps	Goals	Apps	Goals
Newcastle United	2001–02	Premier League	0	0	0	0	0	0	0	0	0	0
Newcastle United	2002–03	Premier League	0	0	0	0	0	0	0	0	0	0
Newcastle United	2003–04	Premier League	0	0	0	0	0	0	0	0	0	0
Newcastle United	Total		0	0	0	0	0	0	0	0	0	0
Darlington (loan)	2001–02	Third Division	4	0	0	0	0	0	0	0	4	0
Hibernian (loan)	2001–02	Scottish Premier League	11	0	0	0	1	0	0	0	12	0
Coventry City (loan)	2002–03	First Division	36	0	2	0	3	0	—		41	0
Derby County (loan)	2003–04	First Division	9	0	0	0	1	0	—		10	0
Hibernian	2003–04	Scottish Premier League	17	1	0	0	2	0	—		19	1
Hibernian	2004–05	Scottish Premier League	37	3	4	1	3	0	2 (Note: Appearances in UEFA Intertoto Cup)	0	46	4
Hibernian	2005–06	Scottish Premier League	34	1	4	1	1	0	2 (Note: Appearances in UEFA Cup)	0	41	2
Hibernian	Total		88	5	8	2	6	0	4	0	106	7
Celtic	2006–07	Scottish Premier League	21	0	2	0	1	0	4 (Note: Appearances in UEFA Champions League)	0	28	0
Celtic	2007–08	Scottish Premier League	35	1	4	1	2	0	10	0	51	2
Celtic	2008–09	Scottish Premier League	36	2	2	1	3	0	6	0	47	3
Celtic	2009–10	Scottish Premier League	14	1	0	0	2	0	9 (Note: Four appearances in UEFA Champions League, five in UEFA Europa League)	0	25	1
Celtic	Total		106	4	8	2	8	0	29	0	151	6
Wigan Athletic	2009–10	Premier League	16	2	1	0	0	0	—		17	2
Wigan Athletic	2010–11	Premier League	23	0	2	0	1	0	—		26	0
Wigan Athletic	2011–12	Premier League	36	3	1	0	0	0	—		37	3
Wigan Athletic	2012–13	Premier League	25	1	0	0	1	0	—		26	1
Wigan Athletic	2013–14	Championship	2	0	1	0	0	0	2 (Note: Appearances in EFL Championship play-offs)	0	5	0
Wigan Athletic	2014–15	Championship	0	0	0	0	0	0	—		0	0
Wigan Athletic	Total		102	6	5	0	2	0	2	0	111	6
Career total			356	15	23	4	21	0	35	0	435	19

=== International ===
Appearances and goals by national team and year
National team	Year	Apps	Goals
Scotland	2002	4	0
Scotland	2003	—	
Scotland	2004	9	1
Scotland	2005	4	0
Scotland	2006	6	1
Scotland	2007	2	0
Scotland	2008	6	0
Scotland	2009	5	0
Scotland	2010	2	0
Scotland	2011	8	0
Scotland	2012	7	0
Scotland	2013	2	0
Total		55	2

Scores and results list Scotland's goal tally first, score column indicates score after each Caldwell goal.

List of international goals scored by Gary Caldwell
No.	Date	Venue	Opponent	Score	Result	Competition
1	30 May 2004	Easter Road, Edinburgh, Scotland	Trinidad and Tobago	3–0	4–1	Friendly
2	7 October 2006	Hampden Park, Glasgow, Scotland	France	1–0	1–0	UEFA Euro 2008 qualifying

== Managerial statistics ==
As of match played 21 November 2026

Managerial record by team and tenure
Team	From	To	Record					Ref.
Team	From	To	P	W	D	L	Win %	Ref.
Wigan Athletic	7 April 2015	25 October 2016	71	29	22	20	40.8	
Chesterfield	17 January 2017	16 September 2017	29	3	8	18	10.3	
Partick Thistle	15 October 2018	18 September 2019	42	16	11	15	38.1	
Exeter City	24 October 2022	16 February 2026	180	66	38	76	36.7	
Wigan Athletic	16 February 2026	Present	37	16	7	14	43.2	
Total			359	130	86	143	36.2	

== Honours ==
=== Player ===
Celtic

- Scottish Premier League: 2006–07, 2007–08
- Scottish Cup: 2006–07
- Scottish League Cup: 2008–09

Wigan Athletic

- FA Cup: 2012–13

Scotland U16s

- Victory Shield: 1997–98

Individual

- SFWA Footballer of the Year: 2008–09
- SFWA International Player of the Year: 2008–09
- Clydesdale Bank SPL Player of the Year: 2009
- Scottish FA International Roll of Honour inductee 2012
- Wigan Athletic Player of the Season: 2011–12

=== Manager ===
Wigan Athletic

- Football League One: 2015–16

Individual

- League One Manager of the Month: February 2016
- LMA League One Manager of the Year: 2016

== See also ==
- List of Scotland national football team captains
- List of Scottish football families
