= Jordi Gómez =

Spanish footballer (born 1985)

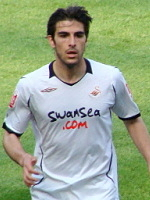
- Gómez playing for Swansea City in 2009

Personal information
- Full name: Jordi Gómez García-Penche
- Date of birth: 24 May 1985 (age 41)
- Place of birth: Barcelona, Spain
- Height: 1.78 m (5 ft 10 in)
- Position: Central midfielder

Youth career
- Barcelona

Senior career*
Years	Team	Apps	(Gls)
2003–2006	Barcelona C		
2005–2007	Barcelona B	59	(6)
2006	Barcelona	0	(0)
2007–2008	Espanyol B	22	(10)
2008–2009	Espanyol	3	(0)
2008–2009	→ Swansea City (loan)	44	(12)
2009–2014	Wigan Athletic	127	(17)
2014–2016	Sunderland	35	(4)
2016	→ Blackburn Rovers (loan)	19	(3)
2016–2017	Wigan Athletic	15	(3)
2017	Rayo Vallecano	12	(0)
2017–2018	Levski Sofia	35	(4)
2018–2022	Omonia	93	(12)
2023	Omonia 29M	11	(1)
Total		475+	(72+)

International career
2001	Spain U17	1	(0)
- * Club domestic league appearances and goals

Jordi Gómez García-Penche (born 24 May 1985) is a Spanish former professional footballer who played as a central midfielder.

After playing for the reserve teams of Barcelona and Espanyol, he spent most of his career in England, mainly with Wigan Athletic with whom he won the FA Cup in 2013.

== Club career ==
=== Early career ===
Born in Barcelona, Catalonia, Gómez emerged through Barcelona's youth ranks. He played once for the first team in competitive games, coming on for Thiago Motta in the 68th minute of a 6–0 win against Zamora in the Copa del Rey on 11 January 2006.

Gómez completed his development with neighbours Espanyol, making his official debut with the latter in a 4–0 away defeat to Real Murcia CF on 23 March 2008. He appeared in two more La Liga matches during his tenure, always as a second-half substitute.

=== Swansea City ===
On 6 June 2008, Gómez signed for Swansea City of the Football League Championship on a season-long loan, for a fee of £200,000; his teammate Albert Serrán also made the move, albeit in a permanent situation. He scored the winning goal with a deflected free kick against rivals Cardiff City on 23 September, in the first South Wales derby for seven years.

Scouts describe Gómez as having "a lovely ability to receive the ball in space or if he is marked tightly, find space after his first touch." Whilst on loan, reports surfaced that Swansea wanted to sign him permanently and other teams were supposedly interested in acquiring his services, but nothing came of it, as manager Roberto Martínez eventually announced the club would not be able to retain the player due to his high price tag.

=== Wigan Athletic ===
Gómez finished the season with 14 goals in all competitions and returned to Espanyol, being immediately sold to Premier League side Wigan Athletic on a three-year contract on 19 June 2009, with the transfer fee estimated to be in the region of £1.7 million – the move also meant he would be reunited with his former Swansea boss, compatriot Martínez. He debuted in a 2–0 victory over Aston Villa on 15 August, and netted his first goal for the club against Birmingham City on 5 December, albeit in a 2–3 home loss.

Gómez scored his second league goal in a 2–0 defeat of Wolverhampton Wanderers on 2 October 2010. However, during the match, he escaped suffering a leg injury after a challenge from Karl Henry.

On 17 December 2011, Gómez scored the equaliser for the hosts in a 1–1 draw against Chelsea, his fourth goal in five league games. He netted the second goal at Arsenal in the eighth minute of an eventual 2–1 away win on 16 April 2012 at the Emirates Stadium, and the Latics once again managed to avoid relegation.

On 28 August 2012, Gómez scored once as Wigan defeated Nottingham Forest 4–1 away to reach the third round of the Football League Cup. On 24 November, he netted a hat-trick to help his club win 3–2 at home against Reading at the DW Stadium, becoming just the second Spaniard to achieve the feat in the Premier League after Fernando Torres.

On 9 March 2013, Gómez provided the cross from which Maynor Figueroa opened the scoring at Everton, and he added the final 3–0 for his team's third goal in as many minutes, in an eventual qualification to the semi-finals of the FA Cup. He helped them win the competition, being replaced after 81 minutes by Ben Watson, who went on to score the winning goal; however, only three days later, with him on the pitch again, the side were relegated from the top division following a 1–4 away defeat to Arsenal.

Gómez remained at Wigan for their first season back in the Championship, and also participated in the club's inaugural campaign in the UEFA Europa League. On 12 December 2013, in the last group stage match, he scored a penalty kick to put his team ahead at Maribor, but the Slovene ultimately won 2–1.

=== Sunderland ===
On 29 May 2014, Gómez signed a three-year deal with Sunderland on a free transfer after his contract at Wigan expired. He made his debut on 16 August, coming on as a 68th-minute substitute for Jack Rodwell in a 2–2 draw away to West Bromwich Albion, and scored his first goal 11 days later in a 3–0 League Cup second-round victory at Birmingham City.

Gómez scored his first league goal for his new team on 3 November, the second in a 3–1 away win over Crystal Palace. His third goal of the campaign came on 13 December, where he scored a penalty to open the scoring in a 1–1 draw at home to West Ham United.

On 3 February 2015, Gómez netted another penalty in a 3–1 win at Fulham in an FA Cup fourth round replay. On 2 May, again from 12 yards, he scored once in each half as the Black Cats defeated Southampton 2–1 at the Stadium of Light. The following week, his shot was deflected in by Danny Graham to give the latter his first Sunderland goal, in a 2–0 away victory over Everton; still in that month, he was ruled out for the last three games of the season with a fractured kneecap.

In the 2016 winter transfer window, after making only six appearances in the first half of the season, Gómez was loaned to Championship club Blackburn Rovers until June. He scored in his debut on 6 February, helping to a 1–1 draw at Middlesbrough. He netted twice three weeks later, including a last-minute winner from a 30-yard free kick in a 3–2 win against Milton Keynes Dons at Ewood Park.

=== Three clubs in two years ===
On 17 August 2016, Gómez rejoined Wigan Athletic on a one-year contract. He returned to Spain after nearly nine years on 31 January 2017, signing with Rayo Vallecano of the Segunda División.

Gómez moved to Bulgarian club Levski Sofia on 6 July 2017, on a two-year deal.

=== Omonia ===
On 16 August 2018, Gómez joined Omonia of the Cypriot First Division on a two-year contract. Already as team captain, he agreed to extensions until 2021 and 2022.

Gómez's team was leading the 2019–20 championship when the season was abandoned due to the COVID-19 pandemic; although they were not awarded the title, they did secure a place in the qualifying rounds of the UEFA Champions League.

The following campaign proved successful for both team and player, as Gómez helped them qualify for the group stage of a European competition for the first time in history. On 29 October 2020, he scored a goal from inside his half in a 2–1 home loss against PSV in the Europa League, breaking the record for the furthest distance for a goal ever scored in the competition. He ended the domestic league as a champion, Omonia's first in 11 years.

On 25 November 2021, Gómez scored again from his half in the 89th minute of a 2–2 away draw at Qarabağ in the Europa Conference League. The following February, he suffered a ruptured knee ligament which kept him out of action for several months. He scored his last goal for the club on 5 January in the 1–1 away draw against Pafos, and in May it was announced that the 37-year-old would not be retained.

=== Later career ===
Gómez signed a one-year deal with Cypriot Second Division side PAC Omonia 29M in November 2022, effective from 1 January 2023.

== Career statistics ==
As of the end of 2022–23 season

Appearances and goals by club, season and competition
Club	Season	League			National Cup		League Cup		Continental		Other		Total	
Club	Season	Division	Apps	Goals	Apps	Goals	Apps	Goals	Apps	Goals	Apps	Goals	Apps	Goals
Barcelona B	2004–05	Segunda División B	2	0	—		—		—		—		2	0
Barcelona B	2005–06	Segunda División B	36	6	—		—		—		—		36	6
Barcelona B	2006–07	Segunda División B	21	0	—		—		—		—		21	0
Barcelona B	Total		59	6	—		—		—		—		59	6
Barcelona	2005–06	La Liga	0	0	1	0	—		0	0	0	0	1	0
Espanyol B	2007–08	Segunda División B	22	10	—		—		—		—		22	10
Espanyol	2007–08	La Liga	3	0	0	0	—		—		—		3	0
Swansea City (loan)	2008–09	Championship	44	12	3	0	4	2	—		—		51	14
Wigan Athletic	2009–10	Premier League	23	1	2	0	0	0	—		—		25	1
Wigan Athletic	2010–11	Premier League	13	1	3	0	4	2	—		—		20	3
Wigan Athletic	2011–12	Premier League	28	5	1	0	0	0	—		—		29	5
Wigan Athletic	2012–13	Premier League	32	3	7	3	3	2	—		—		42	8
Wigan Athletic	2013–14	Championship	31	7	5	3	1	0	6 (Note: Appearances in UEFA Europa League)	1	3 (Note: One appearance in FA Community Shield, two appearances in Championship play-offs)	0	46	11
Wigan Athletic	Total		127	17	18	6	8	4	6	1	3	0	162	28
Sunderland	2014–15	Premier League	29	4	2	1	2	1	—		—		33	6
Sunderland	2015–16	Premier League	6	0	0	0	0	0	—		—		6	0
Sunderland	Total		35	4	2	1	2	1	—		—		39	6
Blackburn Rovers (loan)	2015–16	Championship	19	3	0	0	0	0	—		—		19	3
Wigan Athletic	2016–17	Championship	15	3	1	0	0	0	—		—		16	3
Rayo Vallecano	2016–17	Segunda División	12	0	0	0	—		—		—		12	0
Levski Sofia	2017–18	First League	31	4	6	1	—		2	0	—		39	5
Levski Sofia	2018–19	First League	4	0	0	0	—		2	0	—		6	0
Levski Sofia	Total		35	4	6	1	0	0	4	0	—		45	5
Omonia	2018–19	Cypriot First Division	30	8	2	0	—		—		—		32	8
Omonia	2019–20	Cypriot First Division	20	3	2	0	—		—		—		22	3
Omonia	2020–21	Cypriot First Division	30	0	1	0	—		10 (Note: Four appearances and one goal in UEFA Champions League, six appearances and two goals in UEFA Europa League)	3	—		41	3
Omonia	2021–22	Cypriot First Division	13	1	0	0	—		11 (Note: Two appearances in UEFA Champions League, four appearances in UEFA Europa League, five appearances and two goals in UEFA Europa Conference League)	2	1 (Note: Appearance in Cypriot Super Cup)	0	25	3
Omonia	Total		93	12	5	0	0	0	21	5	1	0	120	17
Omonia 29M	2022–23	Cypriot Second Division	11	1	0	0	—		—		—		11	1
Career total			469	71	36	8	14	7	31	6	4	0	554	92

== Honours ==
Wigan Athletic

- FA Cup: 2012–13

Omonia

- Cypriot First Division: 2020–21
- Cypriot Cup: 2021–22
- Cypriot Super Cup: 2021

Individual

- Football League Championship Team of the Year: 2008–09
- Wigan Athletic Player of the Year: 2013–14
