= Callum McManaman =

English footballer (born 1991)

Personal information
- Full name: Callum Henry McManaman
- Date of birth: 25 April 1991 (age 35)
- Place of birth: Huyton, England
- Height: 5 ft 9 in (1.75 m)
- Position: Winger

Team information
- Current team: Wigan Athletic
- Number: 20

Youth career
- 1999–2007: Everton
- 2007–2009: Wigan Athletic

Senior career*
Years	Team	Apps	(Gls)
2009–2015	Wigan Athletic	79	(10)
2011–2012	→ Blackpool (loan)	14	(2)
2015–2017	West Bromwich Albion	20	(0)
2017	→ Sheffield Wednesday (loan)	11	(0)
2017–2018	Sunderland	24	(1)
2018–2019	Wigan Athletic	22	(1)
2019–2020	Luton Town	23	(4)
2020–2021	Melbourne Victory	18	(4)
2021–2022	Tranmere Rovers	29	(2)
2023–	Wigan Athletic	78	(3)

International career
2011	England U20	4	(0)
- * Club domestic league appearances and goals as of 14:53, 3 October 2026 (UTC)

Callum Henry McManaman (born 25 April 1991) is an English professional footballer who plays as a winger for EFL League One side Wigan Athletic.

Born in Huyton, Merseyside, but lived and brought up in Rainhill, Merseyside. McManaman began his youth career at Everton before being released in 2007 and joined Wigan Athletic.

He made his first senior debut for Wigan Athletic in 2009. He became the man of the match at the 2013 FA Cup Final for Wigan Athletic on 1–0 winning-match against Manchester City.

In January 2015, he joined West Bromwich Albion for £4.75 million.

On 13 October 2020, McManaman signed a two-year contract with A-League club Melbourne Victory ahead of the 2020–21 A-League season.

In June 2023, he rejoined Wigan Athletic for his third spell at the club.

== Club career ==
=== Wigan Athletic ===
McManaman was born in Huyton. He grew up as an Everton supporter, and joined the club's youth system when he was seven years old. After being released by the club at the age of sixteen, he signed for Wigan Athletic on a free transfer in 2007. He made his debut for the reserves toward the end of the 2007–08 season. He became a regular in the reserve team during the second half of the following season, appearing ten times and scoring four goals. He then made his first team debut on 24 May 2009 in a Premier League match against Portsmouth, becoming Wigan's youngest-ever player to play in the Premier League.

In July 2009, he signed his first professional contract with the club. McManaman remained in the reserve team during the 2009–10 season, scoring twice in a 5–0 win against Burnley. Although he did not appear in the first team, he earned a contract extension.

McManaman was an unused substitute in the first team at the start of the 2010–11 season, but Wigan manager Roberto Martínez felt the player was not yet ready for Premier League football. On 30 November 2010, he made his first appearance in over 18 months when he came on as a substitute in a League Cup match against Arsenal. Martínez suggested the player would feature more regularly later in the season. He scored his first goal for Wigan in his first start for the club against Hull City in the FA Cup on 8 January 2011. In April 2011, he extended his contract for a further two years, keeping him at the club until 2013.

On 17 October 2011, McManaman joined Blackpool in a three-month loan deal. He made his debut a day later, appearing as a substitute against Doncaster Rovers, and made his first start for the club in the following game against Nottingham Forest. On 3 December 2011, he scored his first league goal in a 1–0 win against Reading. After he returned from his loan spell at Blackpool, McManaman scored against Swindon Town in the FA Cup on 7 January 2012. He returned to Premier League football at the DW Stadium on 16 January 2012 as an 81st-minute substitute in a single-goal defeat to Manchester City.

McManaman scored as a substitute in the 89th minute in Wigan's first League Cup game of the 2012–13 season, capping off a 1–4 win over Nottingham Forest. In January 2013, he signed a new contract with Wigan until 2016. On 17 February 2013, in the fifth round of the FA Cup, McManaman scored one goal and was named man-of-the-match in a 4–1 win against Huddersfield Town, helping Wigan reach the quarter-finals for the first time in 26 years. In that quarter-final match, he scored against his former club Everton, at Goodison Park, in a 3–0 win that sent Wigan to the semi-finals at Wembley.

After the Everton game, McManaman made his first Premier League start against Newcastle United on 17 March 2013. His horrific challenge on Massadio Haïdara in that game was the subject of a two-day review by The Football Association; the Association concluded it lacked the authority to penalise McManaman retrospectively. On 23 March 2013, The Daily Telegraph reported that the McManaman situation had prompted the FA "... to raise the issue with the other 'stakeholders' involved in setting disciplinary guidelines ... at the end of the season."

On 27 April 2013, he scored his first Premier League goal for Wigan in a 2–2 draw against Tottenham Hotspur. A week later, he scored the winning goal in a 3–2 win against West Bromwich Albion. On 11 May, he was named man-of-the-match in the FA Cup Final, leading Wigan to a 1–0 victory over Manchester City.

=== West Bromwich Albion ===
On 28 January 2015, McManaman signed for Premier League club West Bromwich Albion on a three-and-a-half-year contract for £4.75 million. He was the first signing for the club by Tony Pulis.

On 27 December 2016, McManaman signed for Championship club Sheffield Wednesday on loan for the remainder of the season. He played in their first match of 2017 against Wolverhampton Wanderers on 2 January.

=== Sunderland ===
McManaman signed for Sunderland on 31 August 2017 on a two-year contract for an undisclosed fee. He scored his first goal for Sunderland with a 96th-minute equaliser in a 3–3 draw with Middlesbrough on 24 February 2018.

=== Return to Wigan Athletic ===
On 20 July 2018, McManaman returned to his boyhood club Wigan Athletic for an undisclosed fee, signing onto a one-year rolling contract.

=== Luton Town ===
On 4 June 2019, McManaman signed for newly promoted Championship club Luton Town on a free transfer. He was released at the end of the 2019–20 season.

=== Melbourne Victory ===
On 13 October 2020, McManaman signed a two-year contract with A-League club Melbourne Victory ahead of the 2020–21 A-League season. In July 2021, he was released by Melbourne Victory, with one-year left on his contract.

=== Tranmere Rovers ===
On 9 July, it was announced that McManaman had made a return to English football, signing with League Two side Tranmere Rovers on a one-year deal. McManaman was released at the end of the 2021–22 season.

=== Third spell at Wigan Athletic ===
On 30 June 2023, McManaman returned to League One side Wigan Athletic for a third spell in his career, signing a one-year deal.

== International career ==
McManaman is available to represent England and the Republic of Ireland, through Irish ancestry.

In June 2011, McManaman, along with teammate Lee Nicholls, was included in the England under-20s squad for the 2011 FIFA U-20 World Cup, the first time a Wigan Athletic player has been involved in the tournament. He made his debut in a group match – a 0–0 draw against North Korea, and went on to play in all of England's games during the tournament before the team were knocked out by Nigeria.

On 14 May, he was called up for the first time to the England Under 21s for the 2013 UEFA European Under-21 Football Championship in Israel. However, he was ruled out of the tournament due to an ankle injury picked up in a game against Arsenal on the same day.

== Career statistics ==
As of 18 August 2026

Appearances and goals by club, season and competition
Club	Season	League			FA Cup		League Cup		Other		Total	
Club	Season	Division	Apps	Goals	Apps	Goals	Apps	Goals	Apps	Goals	Apps	Goals
Wigan Athletic	2008–09	Premier League	1	0	0	0	0	0	—		1	0
Wigan Athletic	2009–10	Premier League	0	0	0	0	0	0	—		0	0
Wigan Athletic	2010–11	Premier League	3	0	3	1	1	0	—		7	1
Wigan Athletic	2011–12	Premier League	2	0	1	1	1	0	—		4	1
Wigan Athletic	2012–13	Premier League	20	2	7	3	3	1	—		30	6
Wigan Athletic	2013–14	Championship	30	3	5	1	0	0	9 (Note: One appearance in FA Community Shield, six in UEFA Europa League, two in Championship play-offs)	0	44	4
Wigan Athletic	2014–15	Championship	23	5	0	0	0	0	—		23	5
Wigan Athletic	Total		79	10	16	6	5	1	9	0	109	17
Blackpool (loan)	2011–12	Championship	14	2	0	0	—		—		14	2
West Bromwich Albion	2014–15	Premier League	8	0	2	0	0	0	—		10	0
West Bromwich Albion	2015–16	Premier League	12	0	1	0	2	0	—		15	0
West Bromwich Albion	Total		20	0	3	0	2	0	0	0	25	0
West Bromwich Albion U23	2016–17	—			—		—		1 (Note: Appearance in EFL Trophy)	0	1	0
Sheffield Wednesday (loan)	2016–17	Championship	11	0	1	0	0	0	—		12	0
Sunderland	2017–18	Championship	24	1	1	0	1	0	—		26	1
Sunderland U23	2017–18	—			—		—		1	0	1	0
Wigan Athletic	2018–19	Championship	22	1	1	0	1	0	—		24	1
Luton Town	2019–20	Championship	23	4	0	0	3	0	—		26	4
Melbourne Victory	2020–21	A-League	18	4	—		—		4 (Note: Appearances in the AFC Champions League)	0	22	4
Tranmere Rovers	2021–22	League Two	29	2	2	1	1	0	1	0	33	3
Wigan Athletic	2023–24	League One	37	2	3	0	1	0	4	0	45	2
Wigan Athletic	2024–25	League One	26	1	2	0	0	0	2	1	30	2
Wigan Athletic	2025–26	League One	14	0	2	0	2	0	3	0	21	0
Wigan Athletic	2026–27	League One	1	0	0	0	0	0	1	0	2	0
Wigan Athletic	Total		78	3	7	0	3	0	10	1	98	4
Career total			318	27	31	7	16	1	26	1	391	36

== Honours ==
Wigan Athletic

- FA Cup: 2012–13
