= Joel Robles =

Spanish footballer

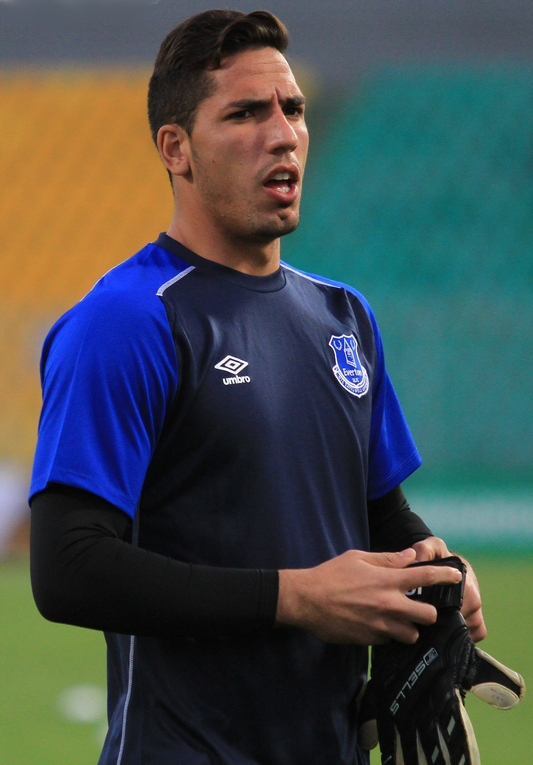
- Robles at Everton in 2014

Personal information
- Full name: Joel Robles Blázquez
- Date of birth: 17 June 1990 (age 36)
- Place of birth: Getafe, Spain
- Height: 1.97 m (6 ft 6 in)
- Position: Goalkeeper

Team information
- Current team: Estoril
- Number: 1

Youth career
- 1999–2002: Getafe
- 2002–2009: Atlético Madrid

Senior career*
Years	Team	Apps	(Gls)
2007–2009	Atlético Madrid C	39	(0)
2009–2010	Atlético Madrid B	28	(0)
2009–2013	Atlético Madrid	2	(0)
2012	→ Rayo Vallecano (loan)	13	(0)
2013	→ Wigan Athletic (loan)	9	(0)
2013–2018	Everton	42	(0)
2018–2022	Real Betis	56	(0)
2022–2023	Leeds United	4	(0)
2023–2024	Al-Qadsiah	33	(0)
2024–	Estoril	60	(0)

International career
2005	Spain U16	1	(0)
2006	Spain U17	1	(0)
2011–2013	Spain U21	2	(0)
2012	Spain U23	1	(0)
- * Club domestic league appearances and goals as of 25 May 2026

Joel Robles Blázquez (Spanish pronunciation: [ɟʝoˈel ˈroβles]; born 17 June 1990) is a Spanish professional footballer who plays as a goalkeeper for Primeira Liga club Estoril.

Robles started his professional career at Atlético Madrid, initially in the C team in 2008, before progressing into the B team a year later, before being promoted into the senior squad. He moved on loan to Rayo Vallecano in January 2012, and again a year later to Premier League side Wigan Athletic, where he was part of their 2013 FA Cup Final-winning side before joining Everton.

Robles played internationally for Spain at under-16, under-17, under-21 and under-23 level, and was part of the squad that won the 2013 European Under-21 Championship.

== Club career ==
=== Atlético Madrid ===
Born in Leganés, Madrid, Robles is a youth product of Getafe, joining neighbouring Atlético Madrid in 2005 to finish his development. He spent his first professional season, (2009–10), with the reserve side in Segunda División B and, on 27 December 2009, signed his first professional contract, running until June 2014.

On 8 May 2010, Robles made his La Liga debut in a 1–1 away draw against Sporting de Gijón: starter David de Gea (another Atlético youth graduate) was being rested for the UEFA Europa League final, and his replacement, Sergio Asenjo, suffered a severe knee injury after only ten minutes. As a result of Asenjo's injury Robles took his place on the bench for the UEFA Europa League final as Atletico defeated Fulham.

In the 2010–11 campaign, Robles acted mostly as backup, particularly after Asenjo left in January 2011 to join Málaga on loan, only to be again seriously injured in the process. After De Gea was signed by Manchester United in the off-season, Robles was made first-choice by newly appointed manager Gregorio Manzano, but he lost his position after only three official games to the Belgian Thibaut Courtois, on loan from Chelsea.

On 31 January 2012, Robles was loaned to neighbouring Rayo Vallecano – also in the top division – who had lost first-choice keeper Dani Giménez to injury. He played his first game five days later in a 2–1 away win against Real Zaragoza.

=== Wigan Athletic ===
Robles was loaned again in the 2013 winter transfer window, joining a host of compatriots – including manager Roberto Martínez – at Premier League club Wigan Athletic. He made his debut on 26 January, keeping a clean sheet in a 1–0 win over non-league side Macclesfield Town in the fourth round of the FA Cup.

Robles made his first league appearance on 17 March 2013, starting in a 2–1 home victory against Newcastle United. He soon won the battle for first-choice status over Ali Al-Habsi.

On 11 May 2013, Robles started in Wigan's first-ever FA Cup final appearance, preventing Carlos Tevez from scoring twice in the first 45 minutes and eventually keeping a clean sheet in an historic 1–0 win over Manchester City at Wembley.

=== Everton ===
Robles signed for Everton on 9 July 2013, re-joining Martínez on a five-year contract for an undisclosed fee. On 26 December 2013, he played in the Toffees' home defeat against Sunderland. Robles came on as a 24th-minute substitute for Leon Osman, as starting goalkeeper Tim Howard had been sent off for a professional foul. Robles was unable to save the resulting penalty, however, as Everton lost the game 1–0. Robles then made his first Premier League start for Everton against Southampton three days later due to Howard's suspension, with Everton winning 2–1.

On 13 January 2015, in a penalty shootout at the end of an FA Cup third round replay against West Ham United, Robles saved Stewart Downing's penalty kick. When the shootout went to sudden death, however, Robles hit the crossbar while West Ham's goalkeeper, his compatriot Adrián, scored to eliminate Everton. Martínez assigned Robles as be the first-choice goalkeeper, ahead of Howard, in February 2016.

After a match against Burnley in which his gaffe resulted in a penalty, Robles was dropped by Everton manager Ronald Koeman for the away trip to West Ham on 22 April 2017 in a Premier League fixture after claiming the first team spot back in December 2016. As Koeman was not convinced by Robles, Everton completed the signing of Jordan Pickford from Sunderland in June 2017, putting Robles further down in the pecking order. His contract was allowed to expire at the end of June 2018.

=== Real Betis ===
On 5 July 2018, Robles signed a four-year contract with Real Betis. He was first-choice for cup and European matches, while Pau López started league games. As López left for Roma in the next year, he was the first-choice for league matches.

=== Leeds United ===
Following the conclusion of his Real Betis contract Robles joined Leeds United in August 2022, signing a one-year contract. He made his debut for Leeds on 9 November 2022 in the starting line-up for the 1–0 EFL Cup third round defeat to Wolverhampton Wanderers. Under new manager Sam Allardyce Robles replaced Illan Meslier in May 2023 as the starting keeper for Leeds’ remaining league fixtures, conceding 11 goals in the four games in which he played. On 13 June 2023, Leeds United announced that Robles’ contract would not be extended at the end of the 2022–23 season.

=== Al-Qadsiah ===
On 18 July 2023, Robles joined Saudi First Division League club Al-Qadsiah.

== Career statistics ==
=== Club ===
As of match played 16 May 2026

Appearances and goals by club, season and competition
Club	Season	League			National Cup		League Cup		Europe		Other		Total	
Club	Season	Division	Apps	Goals	Apps	Goals	Apps	Goals	Apps	Goals	Apps	Goals	Apps	Goals
Atlético Madrid	2009–10	La Liga	2	0	0	0	—		0	0	—		2	0
Atlético Madrid	2010–11	La Liga	0	0	1	0	—		1 (Note: Appearance(s) in UEFA Europa League)	0	0	0	2	0
Atlético Madrid	2011–12	La Liga	0	0	0	0	—		3	0	—		3	0
Atlético Madrid	2012–13	La Liga	0	0	0	0	—		0	0	0	0	0	0
Atlético Madrid	Total		2	0	1	0	—		4	0	—		7	0
Rayo Vallecano (loan)	2011–12	La Liga	13	0	0	0	—		—		—		13	0
Wigan Athletic (loan)	2012–13	Premier League	9	0	4	0	0	0	—		—		13	0
Everton	2013–14	Premier League	2	0	4	0	2	0	0	0	—		8	0
Everton	2014–15	Premier League	7	0	2	0	0	0	1	0	—		10	0
Everton	2015–16	Premier League	13	0	5	0	6	0	0	0	—		24	0
Everton	2016–17	Premier League	20	0	1	0	0	0	0	0	—		21	0
Everton	2017–18	Premier League	0	0	0	0	0	0	2	0	—		2	0
Everton	Total		42	0	12	0	8	0	3	0	—		65	0
Real Betis	2018–19	La Liga	5	0	8	0	—		6	0	—		19	0
Real Betis	2019–20	La Liga	33	0	1	0	—		—		—		34	0
Real Betis	2020–21	La Liga	18	0	4	0	—		—		—		22	0
Real Betis	2021–22	La Liga	0	0	3	0	—		0	0	—		3	0
Real Betis	Total		56	0	16	0	—		6	0	—		78	0
Leeds United	2022–23	Premier League	4	0	1	0	1	0	—		—		6	0
Al Qadsiah	2023–24	Saudi First Division	33	0	1	0	—		—		—		34	0
Estoril	2024–25	Primeira Liga	29	0	0	0	—		—		—		29	0
Estoril	2025–26	Primeira Liga	31	0	0	0	—		—		—		31	0
Estoril	Total		60	0	0	0	—		—		—		60	0
Career total			214	0	35	0	9	0	13	0	0	0	271	0

== Honours ==
Atlético Madrid

- UEFA Europa League: 2009–10
- UEFA Super Cup: 2010
- Copa del Rey runner-up: 2009–10

Wigan Athletic

- FA Cup: 2012–13

Real Betis

- Copa del Rey: 2021–22

Al-Qadsiah

- Saudi First Division League: 2023–24

Spain U21

- UEFA European Under-21 Championship: 2013
