= 2013 FA Cup final =

English football match

2013 FA Cup Final
- The match was played at Wembley Stadium.
- Event: 2012–13 FA Cup
Manchester City	Wigan Athletic
0	1
- Date: 11 May 2013
- Venue: Wembley Stadium, London
- Man of the Match: Callum McManaman (Wigan Athletic)
- Referee: Andre Marriner (Birmingham)
- Attendance: 86,254

The 2013 FA Cup final was an association football match between Manchester City and Wigan Athletic on 11 May 2013 at Wembley Stadium in London, England, organised by the Football Association (FA). It marked the 132nd final of the Football Association Challenge Cup (FA Cup), the world's oldest football cup competition. It was Wigan's first FA Cup final and Manchester City's tenth. En route to the final, Manchester City defeated Watford, Stoke City, Leeds United, Barnsley and Chelsea; Wigan Athletic beat Bournemouth (after a replay), Macclesfield Town, Huddersfield Town, Everton and Millwall.

The match kicked off in the early evening in front of 86,254 spectators and was refereed by Andre Marriner. After a goalless first half, Manchester City's Pablo Zabaleta was sent off for a second yellow card, becoming the third player to be sent off in an FA Cup final. One minute into injury time, Wigan Athletic won a corner kick which was taken by Shaun Maloney: Ben Watson outjumped Jack Rodwell and headed the ball over Joe Hart, the Manchester City goalkeeper, and into the goal to secure a 1–0 win. The cup was jointly lifted by playing captain Emmerson Boyce and club captain Gary Caldwell. Wigan Athletic's Callum McManaman was named as man of the match.

Manchester City and their semi-final opponent Chelsea had already qualified for the following season's Champions League by virtue of the clubs' league positions. Wigan Athletic secured qualification for the 2013–14 Europa League competition after they had won their semi-final against Millwall. Two days after the final, Manchester City sacked manager Roberto Mancini, confirming rumours of his fate before the match. Three days later, Wigan Athletic were relegated from the Premier League following a 4–1 loss to Arsenal, becoming the first club to win the FA Cup and be relegated from the highest tier of English football in the same season.

== Background ==
The world's oldest football cup competition, the FA Cup is an annual knockout tournament involving professional and amateur men's football clubs in the English football league system. The final of the 2012–13 FA Cup was the 132nd to be played since the tournament was first held in 1872. Manchester City were making their tenth appearance in an FA Cup final since the club was founded in 1880. They had won the cup five times (in 1904, 1934, 1956, 1969 and 2011) and were runners-up four times (1926, 1933, 1955 and 1981). Conversely, Wigan Athletic were making their first appearance in an FA Cup Final since the club was founded in 1932.

Manchester City had won both Premier League games between the sides during the regular season. They secured a 2–0 victory at the DW Stadium in November 2012 with second-half goals from Mario Balotelli and James Milner and a 1–0 win the following April at the City of Manchester Stadium after a late goal from Carlos Tevez. The final was being played before the last two games of the Premier League season, with Wigan Athletic in eighteenth place in the league, 40 points behind Manchester City in second position. Manchester City had beaten Wigan Athletic in each of the most recent seven Premier League matches between the sides. City had also beaten Wigan in both of their previous FA Cup ties; two 1–0 home wins back in 1971 and 2006.

Wigan Athletic's leading scorer during the regular season was Arouna Koné who had 13 goals, 11 in the league and two in the FA Cup. Sergio Agüero led the scoring for Manchester City with 15 goals during the season, including 3 in the FA Cup.

== Route to the final ==
=== Manchester City ===
Manchester City's route to the final
Round	Opposition	Score
3rd	Watford (H)	3–0
4th	Stoke City (A)	1–0
5th	Leeds United (H)	4–0
QF	Barnsley (H)	5–0
SF	Chelsea (N)	2–1
Key: (H) = Home venue; (A) = Away venue; (N) = Neutral venue

As a Premier League team, Manchester City entered the 2012–13 FA Cup in the third round, in which they were drawn at home against EFL Championship team Watford. Midway through the first half, Tevez gave Manchester City the lead with a free kick from around 25 yards (23 m). Costel Pantilimon then saved a Fernando Forestieri shot for Watford. One minute before half-time, Gareth Barry doubled Manchester City's lead with a header. In second-half stoppage time, Manchester City academy player Rony Lopes scored from close range to secure a 3–0 victory for his side. In doing so, he became the club's youngest ever goalscorer at the age of seventeen years and eight days. Manchester City progressed to a fourth round match against fellow Premier League side Stoke City away at the Britannia Stadium. Despite long spells of possession for the visiting team, the first half ended goalless. David Silva struck the Stoke goalpost and Tevez saw shots saved by the Stoke goalkeeper Thomas Sørensen, before Pablo Zabaleta converted a cross from Agüero with four minutes remaining. Manchester City won the match 1–0 and progressed to the fifth round where they faced Championship side Leeds United at the City of Manchester Stadium.

Yaya Touré gave Manchester City the lead in the fifth minute, taking the ball past Leeds United goalkeeper Jamie Ashdown and scoring after a pass from Tevez. Agüero then doubled his side's lead when he scored from the penalty spot after he had been fouled by Tom Lees. Tevez scored Manchester City's third from close range soon after half-time before Agüero scored 15 minutes from the end of the match to secure a 4–0 victory. In the quarter-final, Manchester City's opponents were Championship club Barnsley at home. Tevez scored the first goal for Manchester City in the eleventh minute after Silva's volley rebounded off the goalpost. Aleksandar Kolarov and Tevez then scored in quick succession to make it 3–0 at half-time. Five minutes after the interval, Tevez completed his hat-trick, scoring from Samir Nasri's pass. Midway through the second half, Silva scored after his initial shot was kept out by Barnsley goalkeeper Luke Steele to make it 5–0, which was the final score.

In the semi-final, Manchester City faced defending FA Cup champions Chelsea for the first time in the competition since 1971, the match being held at Wembley, a neutral venue. Ten minutes before half-time, Manchester City took the lead. Agüero's shot bounced off Chelsea's defender César Azpilicueta and the ball fell to Nasri who scored. Vincent Kompany then shot off-target shortly before half-time, and two minutes after the interval Barry's cross found Agüero, who headed the ball into the Chelsea goal off the post while goalkeeper Petr Čech remained motionless. Demba Ba then scored past Pantilimon to reduce the deficit for Chelsea but the match ended 2–1 and Manchester City progressed to the final.

=== Wigan Athletic ===
Wigan Athletic's route to the final
Round	Opposition	Score
3rd Replay	AFC Bournemouth (H); AFC Bournemouth (A)	1–1; 0–1
4th	Macclesfield Town (A)	1–0
5th	Huddersfield Town (A)	4–1
QF	Everton (A)	3–0
SF	Millwall (N)	2–0
Key: (H) = Home venue; (A) = Away venue; (N) = Neutral venue

Premier League side Wigan Athletic's FA Cup campaign also began in the third round, in which they faced League One side AFC Bournemouth at the DW Stadium. Roberto Martínez made nine changes to the team that had played in the league four days earlier. Eunan O'Kane scored for the visiting side towards the end of the first half with a strike from distance. Wigan Athletic hit the Bournemouth crossbar twice in the second half before they won a penalty after Simon Francis fouled Maynor Figueroa in the area in the 70th minute. Shwan Jalal saved Jordi Gómez's penalty kick but Gómez scored from the rebound to make it 1–1, and ensured the tie would need to be settled in a replay. At Dean Court ten days later, the match was settled by a single goal: in the first half, Bournemouth's Harry Arter conceded possession of the ball to Mauro Boselli whose shot from around 20 yards (18 m) flew into the top corner of the goal, securing a 1–0 win for Wigan Athletic. They were drawn against non-league team Macclesfield Town in the fourth round. To avoid postponement, snow had to be cleared from the pitch at Moss Rose on the morning of the game. Six minutes into the match, Thierry Audel fouled Callum McManaman in the Macclesfield penalty area and Gómez scored the resulting penalty to give Wigan Athletic the lead. The home side had several opportunities to score, including a header from Audel from 6 yards (5.5 m) which went straight to Wigan Athletic's debutant goalkeeper Joel Robles. Macclesfield's appeals for a penalty late in the match were turned down by the referee and Wigan Athletic won 1–0. Victory gave them their second appearance in the fifth round of the FA Cup since the founding of the club.

In the fifth round, Wigan Athletic were drawn away against Championship team Huddersfield Town. McManaman gave the visiting side the lead in the 31st minute, shooting into the top corner of the goal after a pass from James McArthur. Five minutes before half-time, Koné doubled his side's lead after Gómez had passed from a McManaman cross before McArthur made it 3–0 when he scored in the 56th minute. Lee Novak scored with a header from a Calum Woods cross to reduce Huddersfield Town's deficit but with a minute of the match remaining, Koné scored his second to secure a 4–1 win for Wigan Athletic. Their quarter-final opponents were Premier League side Everton whom they faced at Goodison Park. Wigan Athletic scored three goals within four minutes in the first half: just after half an hour, Wigan Athletic's Figueroa opened the scoring when he headed in a corner. McManaman then doubled the lead when a mistake by Phil Neville allowed him to take the ball past Everton's goalkeeper Ján Mucha and shoot. Gómez then struck a long-range shot into the Everton goal to make it 3–0, the final score. The win ensured Wigan Athletic would play in the first FA Cup semi-final appearance in the club's history.

Wigan Athletic's fifth appearance at Wembley Stadium saw them face Championship side Millwall in the semi-final. In the first half, Koné's cross found Shaun Maloney who volleyed the ball past David Forde in the Millwall goal to give Wigan Athletic the lead. With twelve minutes of the match remaining, Wigan Athletic broke out of defence and Gómez's pass found McManaman who took the ball round Forde to double his side's lead. Wigan Athletic won the match 2–0 and progressed to the first FA Cup final in the club's history.

== Match ==
=== Pre-match ===
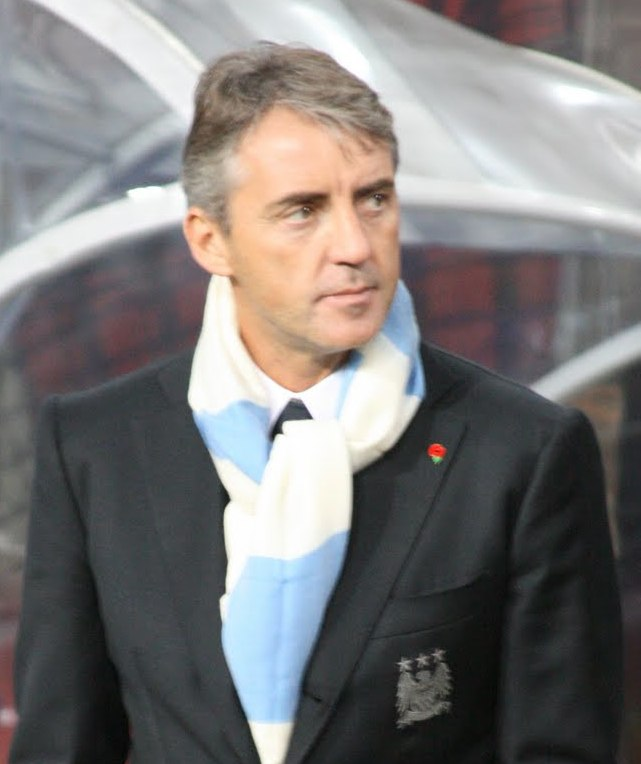
Manchester City's manager Roberto Mancini's position was a matter of speculation before the final.

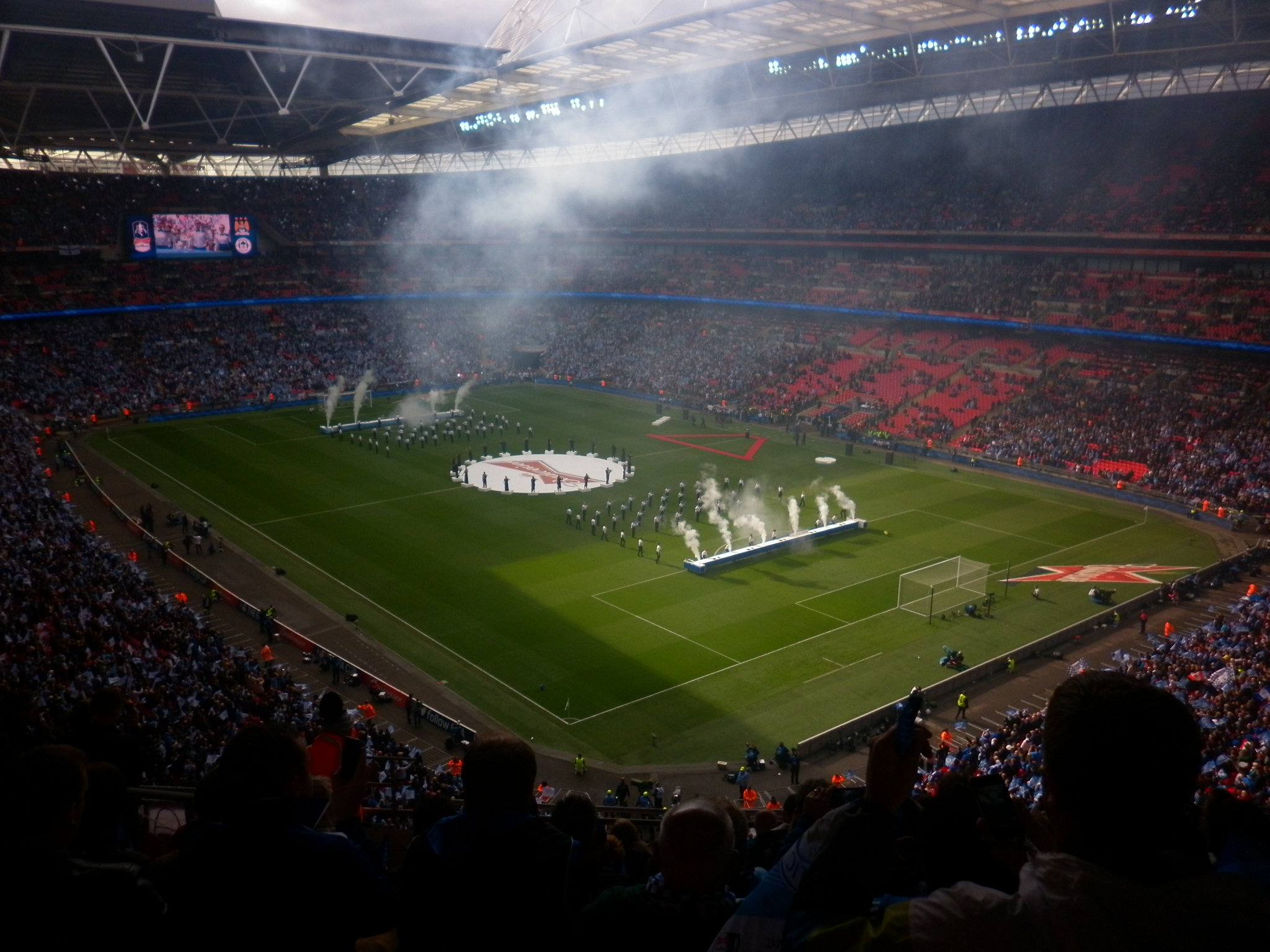
Musical and pyrotechnic performance before the match

Before the match, it was reported in The Daily Telegraph that manager Roberto Mancini's job was under threat after he failed to lead Manchester City to a defence of their league title. It was suggested that the Málaga manager Manuel Pellegrini was to be Mancini's successor. The referee for the match was Andre Marriner who had officiated at Wembley Stadium twice previously, at the 2010 FA Community Shield and the 2010 Football League Championship play-off final. He was assisted by Stephen Child and Simon Long, Anthony Taylor was the fourth official and Gary Beswick acted as the reserve assistant referee.

Manchester City were considered strong favourites to win the match by the British media. Wigan Athletic wore the club's black away kit for the final, used the away team dressing room and were allocated the East End of the stadium. Manchester City fans occupied the West End and the team played in their home kit after winning the coin toss to decide who would wear which kit. Ticket prices for the final started at £45 and were available at £65, £85 and £115, with a £10 discount for concessions. Manchester City received an initial allocation of 25,000 tickets, later increased to 31,779, and Wigan Athletic requested 21,000 tickets, later increased to a 25,000 allocation.

Despite expectations in the media that Pantilimon would retain his position as the Manchester City goalkeeper for the final, he was dropped to the substitute's bench in place of Joe Hart. Before the match, Mancini said "I decided this because I wanted this for this game but it doesn't change anything ... We know Costel is a good keeper." Manchester City had no injury problems, Touré being included in the team after suffering from a muscle problem. Manchester City made eight changes to the starting line-up from their previous match, a Premier League game against West Bromwich; only Hart, Nasri and Tevez keeping their place. Antolín Alcaraz returned to the Wigan Athletic starting lineup after recovering from a torn hamstring in place of Gary Caldwell, and Figueroa was ruled out with a groin injury. Ben Watson dropped to the substitute's bench and was replaced by Gómez. Wigan Athletic adopted a 3–4–1–2 formation, and Manchester City played as a 4–2–3–1.

The kick-off time for the final was 5:15 p.m. as opposed to the traditional 3 p.m. This was controversial, particularly with regard to both sets of supporters facing difficulties in guaranteeing train transport back to the North West of England after the match. The secretary of the Manchester City Supporters Club stated that "Not only does it show that [the FA] don't care but it shows that they don't know", and a spokesperson for the Wigan Athletic Supporters Club noted that "The FA don't think about stuff like young children of four or six years old potentially not getting home till 2 a.m. if they are travelling by coach." It was also the subject of a cross-party early day motion in the House of Commons.

Wigan Athletic owner Dave Whelan led out his team before kick-off along with manager Martínez. The traditional pre-match anthem, "Abide with Me", was performed by musical quartet Amore alongside the Royal Philharmonic Concert Orchestra. The national anthem was also performed by Amore with the Band of the Grenadier Guards. Paralympic footballer Dave Clarke and David Bernstein, chairman of the FA, were introduced to the teams prior to kick-off. In the United Kingdom, the match was televised by ITV and ESPN.

=== Summary ===
==== First half ====
Wigan Athletic kicked off the match around 5:15 p.m. in front of a crowd of 86,254. Two minutes into the game, Zabaleta made a run down the right wing and crossed the ball, which took a deflection before falling to Silva whose volley was blocked by McArthur. Agüero was then fouled by Alcaraz on the edge of the Wigan Athletic penalty area but Tevez's subsequent free kick was blocked with the ball finding Touré whose shot was pushed away by Robles. In the ninth minute, Wigan Athletic's McManaman made a run down the right-hand side of the pitch after a pass from Koné. He cut inside and struck the ball from around 8 yards (7 m), but his shot went wide of the Manchester City post. Wigan Athletic then enjoyed a spell of pressure before Silva's 18th-minute shot for Manchester City was blocked. Midway through the half, Maloney's shot from around 30 yards (27 m) was off-target before Matija Nastasić failed to score with a long-range strike for Manchester City. In the 29th minute, Silva passed the ball into the Wigan Athletic penalty area and found Tevez, who stretched to shoot, but Robles made a save with his boot. Tevez's shot from the corner of the Wigan Athletic penalty area was too high before Gomez's strike from 25 yards (23 m) was blocked by Kompany. With nine minutes of the half remaining, Alcaraz ran through the middle of the pitch and passed to McManaman who went round Nastasić, before his shot was blocked by Zabaleta. Nasri's cross was then headed off-target by Silva. In the 41st minute, Zabaleta's shot was blocked but the ball fell to Barry whose curling strike was saved by Robles. Just before half-time, Robles saved Nasri's 20-yard (18 m) shot and the half ended 0–0.

==== Second half ====
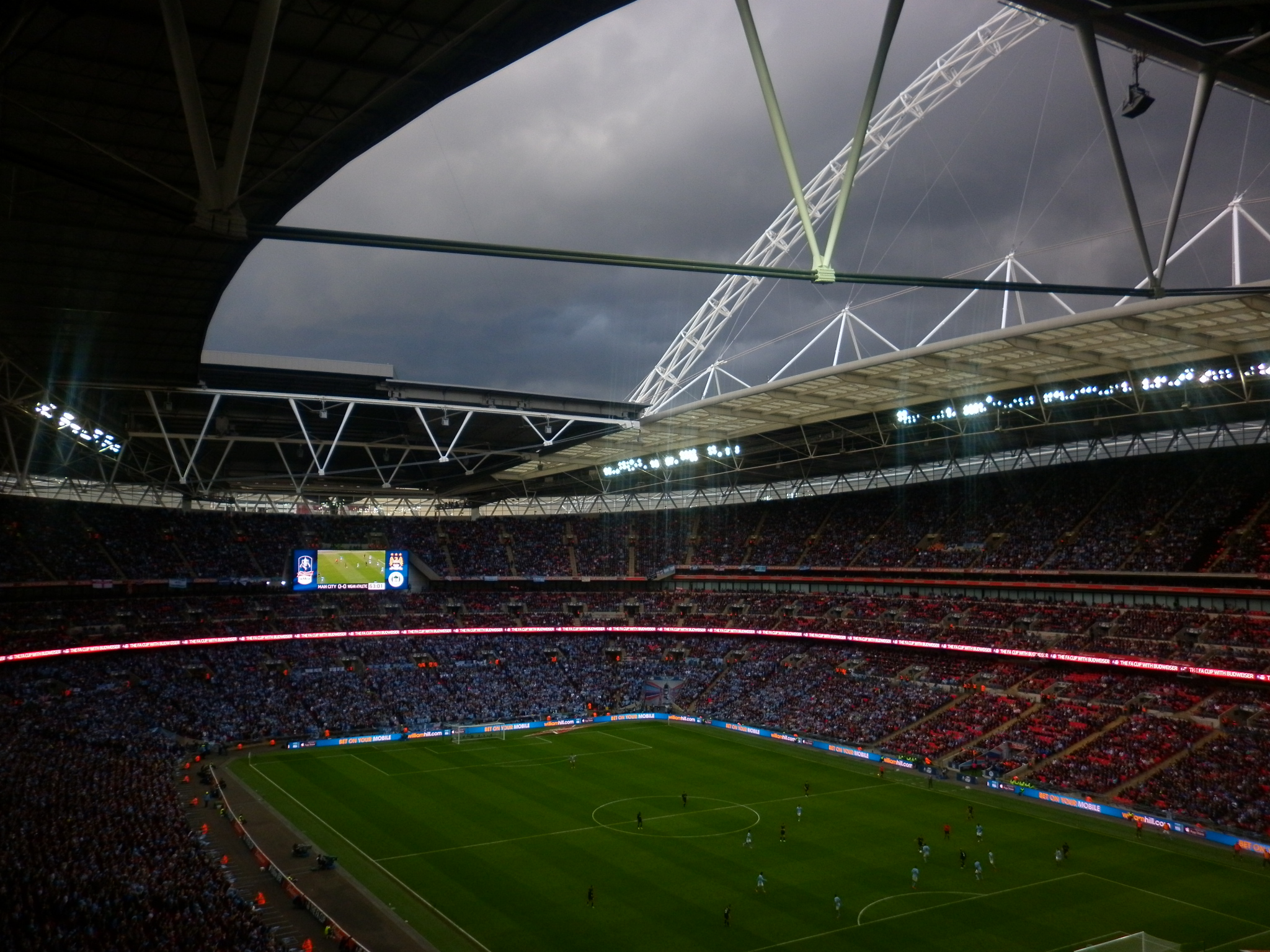
Play during the second half of the match

Neither side made any changes to their playing personnel during the interval and Manchester City kicked off the second half. Two minutes in, McCarthy's shot was wide before Agüero's attempt to score was defended by Emmerson Boyce. A corner from Barry was then headed onto the roof of the Wigan Athletic net by Kompany. In the 54th minute, Manchester City made the first substitution of the game with Milner coming on to replace Nasri. On the hour mark, Zabaleta became the first player of the match to be shown the yellow card after he committed a professional foul on McManaman who had made a break for Wigan Athletic. In the 64th minute, Gomez's shot from 25 yards (23 m) went over the Manchester City crossbar before Kompany tackled McManaman after the Wigan Athletic player had dribbled past both Silva and Gaël Clichy. Five minutes later, Jack Rodwell was brought on in place of Tevez in Manchester City's second change of the game. In the 72nd minute, Roger Espinoza fouled Milner who took the resulting free kick himself, from which Rodwell's header was straight at Robles. Nastasić was then booked for a foul on McManaman before Maloney's cross struck the Manchester City crossbar. In the 81st minute, Wigan Athletic made their first substitution, with Ben Watson coming on to replace Gomez. Three minutes later, Kompany received a poor pass from Clichy in the centre circle which Koné intercepted. He passed to McManaman who was fouled by Zabaleta around 30 yards (27 m) from the Manchester City goal. As a result, Zabaleta was sent off after receiving a second booking, and became the third player to be dismissed in an FA Cup final. Barry was then shown the yellow card for bringing down Maloney. In the final minute of the match, Wigan Athletic won a corner which was played in by Maloney. Watson beat Rodwell to the ball at the near post and headed it inside the far post of the goal to give Wigan Athletic the lead. Three minutes into stoppage time, Robles was booked for time-wasting and Manchester City brought on Edin Džeko for Barry. A minute later, the final whistle was blown and Wigan Athletic had won the match 1–0, securing the FA Cup for the first time in their history.

=== Details ===
11 May 2013
17:15 BST

Manchester City	0–1	Wigan Athletic
	Report, Statistics, Manchester City squad numbers, Wigan Athletic squad numbers	Watson 90+1'

Wembley Stadium, London
Attendance: 86,254
Referee: Andre Marriner (West Midlands)

Manchester City	Wigan Athletic

GK	1	(England) Joe Hart
RB	5	(Argentina) Pablo Zabaleta	(yellow card) 60' (yellow-red card) 84'
CB	4	(Belgium) Vincent Kompany (c)
CB	33	(Serbia) Matija Nastasić	(yellow card) 75'
LB	22	(France) Gaël Clichy
RM	21	(Spain) David Silva
CM	42	(Ivory Coast) Yaya Touré
CM	18	(England) Gareth Barry	(yellow card) 87'	(substituted off) 90+2'
LM	8	(France) Samir Nasri		(substituted off) 54'
CF	16	(Argentina) Sergio Agüero
CF	32	(Argentina) Carlos Tevez		(substituted off) 69'
Substitutes:
GK	30	(Romania) Costel Pantilimon
DF	6	(England) Joleon Lescott
DF	13	(Serbia) Aleksandar Kolarov
MF	7	(England) James Milner		(substituted on) 54'
MF	14	(Spain) Javi García
MF	17	(England) Jack Rodwell		(substituted on) 69'
FW	10	(Bosnia and Herzegovina) Edin Džeko		(substituted on) 90+2'
Manager:
(Italy) Roberto Mancini

GK	1	(Spain) Joel Robles	(yellow card) 90+3'
RCB	17	(Barbados) Emmerson Boyce (c)
CB	3	(Paraguay) Antolín Alcaraz
LCB	33	(Austria) Paul Scharner
RWB	16	(Scotland) James McArthur
CM	4	(Republic of Ireland) James McCarthy
CM	14	(Spain) Jordi Gómez		(substituted off) 81'
LWB	18	(Honduras) Roger Espinoza
AM	10	(Scotland) Shaun Maloney
RF	15	(England) Callum McManaman
LF	2	(Ivory Coast) Arouna Koné
Substitutes:
GK	26	(Oman) Ali Al-Habsi
DF	5	(Scotland) Gary Caldwell
DF	25	(Spain) Román Golobart
MF	8	(England) Ben Watson		(substituted on) 81'
MF	20	(Scotland) Fraser Fyvie
FW	9	(Argentina) Franco Di Santo
FW	11	(Chile) Ángelo Henríquez
Manager:
(Spain) Roberto Martínez

Man of the match

- Callum McManaman (Wigan Athletic)

Match officials

- Assistant referees:
  - Stephen Child (London)
  - Simon Long (Cornwall)
- Fourth official: Anthony Taylor (Cheshire)
- Reserve official: Gary Beswick (Durham)

Match rules

- 90 minutes.
- 30 minutes of extra-time if necessary.
- Penalty shoot-out if scores still level.
- Seven named substitutes.
- Maximum of three substitutions.

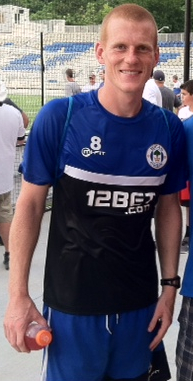
Ben Watson (pictured in June 2013) scored the only goal of the final.

Statistics
	Manchester City	Wigan Athletic
Total shots	15	15
Shots on target	12	7
Ball possession	52%	48%
Corner kicks	5	3
Fouls committed	11	5
Offsides	4	2
Yellow cards	3	1
Red cards	1	0

== Post-match ==
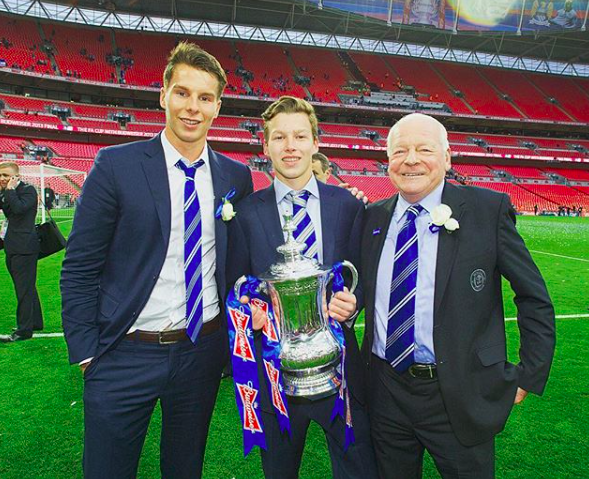
Members of the Wigan Athletic board holding the FA Cup trophy following their team's victory

The cup was jointly lifted by playing captain Boyce and club captain Caldwell. Wigan Athletic's McManaman was named man of the match. On 20 May, Wigan Athletic had an open-top bus tour of the town to celebrate the FA Cup victory. Zabaleta became the third player to be sent off in an FA Cup final, after Kevin Moran (in the 1985 final) and José Antonio Reyes (in 2005). As FA Cup winners, Wigan Athletic received £1.8 million from the FA Cup Prize Fund, and Manchester City earned £900,000.

Sporting Life described the win as the "biggest FA Cup final shock" since Wimbledon's defeat of Liverpool in the 1988 final. Other commentators went further with Fox Sports, BBC Sport and FourFourTwo all saying it was one of the biggest shocks in the competition's history, and bookmaker William Hill agreeing. In a statistical analysis performed by Forbes, the 2013 final was the tenth-biggest "surprise" result in the history of the FA Cup. European newspapers also commented on the shock result, La Gazzetta dello Sport, Die Welt and Le Figaro all noting the historical significance of the event.

Wigan Athletic lost their next Premier League match, a 4–1 defeat against Arsenal at the Emirates Stadium, and were consequently relegated to the Championship. In doing so, they became the first club ever to have won the FA Cup and be relegated from the top tier of English football in the same season. Mancini was dismissed days after the final with the club owners citing that he had "failed to achieve any of the club's targets, with the exception of qualification for next season's Champions League". His assistant, Brian Kidd, took temporary charge of the club and they ended the season with a 2–0 victory at Reading followed by a 3–2 home defeat by Norwich City to finish second in the Premier League.

Because Manchester City and their semi-final opponent Chelsea had already qualified for the following season's Champions League by virtue of their league positions, Wigan Athletic had already gained a place in the group stage of the 2013–14 Europa League competition by winning their semi-final match. They failed to progress to the knockout stage, finishing bottom of Group D.

Pellegrini was appointed as the full-time replacement for Mancini in June 2013. Defender Joleon Lescott later reflected that "it was a little bit weird on the morning of the final. We were eating breakfast together and the TVs were on with Sky Sports News reporting that Mancini was going to get sacked". In early June, Wigan's manager Martínez left the club and joined Everton, being replaced at his former club by Owen Coyle. The final drew a peak television audience of 9.4 million. Despite the criticism of the early evening kick-off time, the BBC confirmed that subsequent finals would be started at a similar time as part of their new deal to broadcast the final from 2014. However, the broadcaster agreed to schedule the match as the last game of the domestic season.

The clubs would meet in both domestic cups the following season at the City of Manchester Stadium; City defeated Wigan 5–0 in the League Cup third round en route to the title, before Wigan defeated City again in the sixth round of the FA Cup, winning 2–1, but failed to retain the trophy after they lost in a penalty shoot-out against eventual winners Arsenal in the semi-final. They met for another FA Cup tie in the 2017–18 tournament where Wigan, then in League One (the third tier of English football), won the fifth round tie 1–0 at the DW Stadium, which was described by BBC Sport as "one of the biggest FA Cup giant-killings".

== Bibliography ==
- O'Leary, Leanne (2017). Employment and Labour Relations Law in the Premier League, NBA and International Rugby Union. Springer. ISBN 978-9-462-65158-6.
