= 2010–11 Wigan Athletic F.C. season =

Wigan Athletic
- Chairman: Dave Whelan
- Manager: Roberto Martínez
- Premier League: 16th
- FA Cup: Fourth round
- League Cup: Quarter-final
- Top goalscorer: League: Charles N'Zogbia/Hugo Rodallega (9); All: Charles N'Zogbia (10)
- Highest home attendance: 22,043 (vs. West Ham United, Premier League, 15 May 2011)
- Lowest home attendance: 6,987 (vs. Preston North End, League Cup, 22 September 2010)
Home colours	Away colours

The 2010–11 English football season was Wigan Athletic F.C.'s 33rd season in the Football League and their sixth consecutive season in the Premier League.

== Season review ==
=== Pre-season ===
Following a mixed first season in charge of the club, manager Roberto Martínez decided to make several additions to the playing squad. Wigan's most expensive summer signing was Argentine striker Mauro Boselli, who signed for an undisclosed fee believed to be in the region of £6 million. Dutch defender Mario Melchiot and Austrian midfielder Paul Scharner both left the club after their contracts expired. Gary Caldwell was named as the new club captain.

There were also changes behind the scenes, with general manager John Benson leaving the club to join Sunderland, re-uniting with former Wigan manager Steve Bruce. Director Maurice Lindsay also stepped down to take up the position of chairman at Preston North End.

Wigan's first pre-season friendly was a 3–2 win against Östersunds FK, with new signing Boselli scoring twice. Their next friendly was a 1–1 draw against Oldham Athletic, featuring trialists Laurent Merlin and Sekou Baradji. Baradji also joined the squad at their pre-season training camp in Austria, but would ultimately not be offered a contract.

=== August ===
The season started badly for Wigan with two heavy defeats at home – a 4–0 loss against newly promoted Blackpool and a 6–0 defeat to reigning Premier League champions Chelsea. Things improved with a 3–0 win in the League Cup against Hartlepool United, followed by a shock 1–0 away win against Tottenham Hotspur – the same fixture in which they suffered a club record 9–1 defeat less than twelve months earlier. The club was active on transfer deadline day, completing the signings of Tom Cleverley on loan from Manchester United and Franco Di Santo on a three-year deal from Chelsea. Charles N'Zogbia also remained at Wigan after having a bid accepted for him from Birmingham City, but failing to agree personal terms.

=== September ===
After an international break, Wigan's first game of the month was against Sunderland, which saw Lee Cattermole and Titus Bramble appear at the DW Stadium for the first time since leaving Wigan. Despite Cattermole being sent off in the first half, Wigan failed to capitalise on their man advantage and drew the match 1–1. The Latics then slipped into the bottom three after a 2–0 home defeat to Manchester City in the following game. The club progressed once again in the League Cup, winning the match 2–1 after a late comeback against Preston North End. The club finished the month with a goalless draw at Birmingham City.

=== October ===
On 2 October, Wigan Athletic picked up their first Premier League home win of the season after defeating Wolverhampton Wanderers 2–0. Two weeks later, the club drew 2–2 away against Newcastle United, with Charles N'Zogbia scoring both goals for Wigan against his former club. Wigan extended their unbeaten run with a 1–1 draw at home against Bolton Wanderers, but midfielder James McCarthy suffered an ankle injury which kept him out of action until the end of January. In the following game however, Gary Caldwell returned to the line-up for the first time since his hip operation during the summer as the team reached the quarter-finals of the League Cup following a 2–0 victory against Swansea City. On 30 October, Wigan were beaten 2–0 by Fulham.

=== November ===
Wigan started the month with a second away defeat in a row, losing 2–1 to Blackburn Rovers. Results then improved in their following two home games with a 1–1 draw against Liverpool and a 1–0 win against West Bromwich Albion. The club lost 2–0 in its next match against Manchester United, finishing the match with nine men after Antolín Alcaraz and Hugo Rodallega were sent off. Two more away defeats followed, against West Ham United and Arsenal in the quarter-final of the League Cup, during which Victor Moses dislocated his shoulder, meaning he would be out of action for three months.

=== December ===
Wigan came from behind twice to draw 2–2 with Stoke City in their first game of the month. The team then extended their unbeaten run with a draw against Everton, a win against Wolverhampton Wanderers and another draw with Arsenal. On 31 December, the club completed the signing of Adrián López on a free transfer.

=== January ===
Wigan lost their first game of the month against Newcastle United, the club's first defeat at home since September. This was followed by an away draw against Bolton Wanderers.

== Transfers ==
=== In ===
Player	From	Fee	Date	Notes
(Argentina) Mauro Boselli	(Argentina) Estudiantes	Undisclosed	29 Jun 2010	
(Paraguay) Antolín Alcaraz	(Belgium) Club Brugge	Undisclosed	22 Jul 2010	
(Scotland) James McArthur	(Scotland) Hamilton Academical	£400,000	23 Jul 2010	
(Netherlands) Ronnie Stam	(Netherlands) Twente	£2,000,000	30 Jul 2010	
(Scotland) Steven Caldwell	Unattached	Free	23 Aug 2010	
(Argentina) Franco Di Santo	(England) Chelsea	£2,000,000	31 Aug 2010	
(Spain) Adrián López	Unattached	Free	31 Dec 2010	
(Republic of Ireland) Conor Sammon	(Scotland) Kilmarnock	£600,000	31 Jan 2011	

=== Out ===
Player	To	Fee	Date	Notes
(Netherlands) Mario Melchiot	(Qatar) Umm-Salal	Free	8 Jun 2010	
(Poland) Tomasz Cywka	(England) Derby County	Free	30 Jun 2010	
(Poland) Tomasz Kupisz	(Poland) Jagiellonia Białystok	Free	14 Jul 2010	
(England) Titus Bramble	(England) Sunderland	Undisclosed	23 Jul 2010	
(Trinidad and Tobago) Jason Scotland	(England) Ipswich Town	Undisclosed	23 Aug 2010	
(England) Jon Routledge	(Scotland) Hamilton Academical	Free	1 Feb 2011	

=== Released ===
Player	Date	Notes
(Netherlands) Rachid Bouaouzan	1 Jul 2010	
(Austria) Paul Scharner	1 Jul 2010	
(Ghana) Richard Kingson	1 Jul 2010	
(France) Olivier Kapo	6 Aug 2010	

=== Loans in ===
Player	From	Start date	End date	Notes
(Oman) Ali Al-Habsi	(England) Bolton Wanderers	15 Jul 2010	End of season	
(England) Tom Cleverley	(England) Manchester United	31 Aug 2010	End of season	

=== Loans out ===
Player	To	Start date	End date	Notes
(Spain) Antonio Amaya	(Spain) Rayo Vallecano	27 Jul 2010	End of season	
(Wales) Jason Koumas	(Wales) Cardiff City	7 Aug 2010	End of season	
(England) Jon Routledge	(Scotland) Hamilton Academical	12 Aug 2010	January 2011	
(England) Lee Nicholls	(England) Hartlepool United	9 Nov 2010	8 Dec 2010	
(England) Chris Kirkland	(England) Leicester City	24 Nov 2010	31 Dec 2010	
(Argentina) Mauro Boselli	(Italy) Genoa	14 Jan 2011	End of season	
(England) Lee Nicholls	(England) Shrewsbury Town	31 Jan 2011	28 Feb 2011	
(England) Lee Nicholls	(England) Sheffield Wednesday	24 Mar 2011	27 Apr 2011	

== Match results ==
=== Legend ===
Win	Draw	Loss

=== Pre-season ===
Date	Opponent	Result	Score	Venue	Scorers	Attendance	Match Report
17 July 2010	Östersunds FK	Win	2–3	Away	Boselli 38', 48', N'Zogbia 60'	3,370	Report
20 July 2010	Oldham Athletic	Draw	1–1	Away	Gómez 47' (pen.)	1,959	Report
26 July 2010	Rudar Velenje	Win	1–4	Away	Gómez 6', McCarthy 10', Scotland 27' (pen.), Boselli 71' (pen.)	–	Report
29 July 2010	Gençlerbirliği	Draw	0–0	Away		–	Report
4 August 2010	Real Zaragoza	Lose	1–3	Home	N'Zogbia 45'	3,500	Report
8 August 2010	Dundee United	Win	1–3	Away	Boselli 38', 48', Moses 82'	3,161 (275 away)	Report

=== Premier League ===
==== Results per matchday ====
Matchday	1	2	3	4	5	6	7	8	9	10	11	12	13	14	15	16	17	18	19	20	21	22	23	24	25	26	27	28	29	30	31	32	33	34	35	36	37	38
Ground	H	H	A	H	H	A	H	A	H	A	A	H	H	A	A	H	A	A	H	H	A	H	A	H	A	H	A	H	A	H	H	A	A	A	H	A	H	A
Result	L	L	W	D	L	D	W	D	D	L	L	D	W	L	L	D	D	W	D	L	D	D	L	L	D	W	D	L	L	W	D	L	W	L	D	D	W	W
Position	19	20	15	17	18	17	13	12	15	16	18	18	17	18	18	18	18	16	16	17	19	17	18	18	18	17	18	19	20	20	20	20	17	18	18	18	19	16

Updated to match(es) played on 22 May 2011. Source: Statto.com
A = Away; H = Home; W = Win; D = Draw; L = Loss

Date	Opponent	Result	Score	Venue	Scorers	Attendance	Match Report
14 August 2010	Blackpool	Lose	0–4	Home		16,152	Report
21 August 2010	Chelsea	Lose	0–6	Home		14,476	Report
28 August 2010	Tottenham Hotspur	Win	0–1	Away	Rodallega 81'	35,101	Report
11 September 2010	Sunderland	Draw	1–1	Home	Alcaraz 86'	15,844	Report
19 September 2010	Manchester City	Lose	0–2	Home		15,525	Report
25 September 2010	Birmingham City	Draw	0–0	Away		22,186	Report
2 October 2010	Wolverhampton Wanderers	Win	2–0	Home	Gómez 64', Rodallega 85'	14,042	Report
16 October 2010	Newcastle United	Draw	2–2	Away	N'Zogbia 22', 23'	44,415	Report
23 October 2010	Bolton Wanderers	Draw	1–1	Home	Rodallega 59'	17,100	Report
30 October 2010	Fulham	Lose	2–0	Away		25,448	Report
6 November 2010	Blackburn Rovers	Lose	2–1	Away	N'Zogbia 74'	24,413	Report
10 November 2010	Liverpool	Draw	1–1	Home	Rodallega 52'	16,754	Report
13 November 2010	West Bromwich Albion	Win	1–0	Home	Moses 70'	16,085	Report
20 November 2010	Manchester United	Lose	2–0	Away		74,181	Report
27 November 2010	West Ham United	Lose	3–1	Away	Cleverley 85'	34,178	Report
4 December 2010	Stoke City	Draw	2–2	Home	Collins 30' (o.g.), Delap 40' (o.g.)	15,100	Report
11 December 2010	Everton	Draw	0–0	Away		32,853	Report
26 December 2010	Wolverhampton Wanderers	Win	1–2	Away	Rodallega 10', Cleverley 20'	26,901	Report
29 December 2010	Arsenal	Draw	2–2	Home	Watson 18' (pen.), Squillaci 81' (og)	17,014	Report
2 January 2011	Newcastle United	Lose	0–1	Home		15,277	Report
5 January 2011	Bolton Wanderers	Draw	1–1	Away	Stam 80'	18,852	Report
15 January 2011	Fulham	Draw	1–1	Home	Rodallega 57'	18,820	Report
22 January 2011	Arsenal	Lose	3–0	Away		59,552	Report
25 January 2011	Aston Villa	Lose	1–2	Home	McCarthy 80'	16,442	Report
1 February 2011	West Bromwich Albion	Draw	2–2	Away	N'Zogbia 20', Watson 43'	25,358	Report
5 February 2011	Blackburn Rovers	Win	4–3	Home	McCarthy 34', 55', Rodallega 50', Watson 65' (pen.)	18,567	Report
12 February 2011	Liverpool	Draw	1–1	Away	Gohouri 65'	44,609	Report
26 February 2011	Manchester United	Lose	0–4	Home		18,140	Report
5 March 2011	Manchester City	Lose	1–0	Away		44,864	Report
19 March 2011	Birmingham City	Win	2–1	Home	Cleverley 26', Figueroa 90+1'	16,421	Report
2 April 2011	Tottenham Hotspur	Draw	0–0	Home		18,578	Report
9 April 2011	Chelsea	Lose	1–0	Away		40,734	Report
16 April 2011	Blackpool	Win	1–3	Away	Rodallega 3', N'Zogbia 45+1', Eardley 67' (o.g.)	16,030	Report
23 April 2011	Sunderland	Lose	4–2	Away	Diamé 52', Di Santo 90'	39,650	Report
30 April 2011	Everton	Draw	1–1	Home	N'Zogbia 21'	17,051	Report
7 May 2011	Aston Villa	Draw	1–1	Away	N'Zogbia 10'	36,293	Report
15 May 2011	West Ham United	Win	3–2	Home	N'Zogbia 57', 90+4', Sammon 68'	22,043	Report
22 May 2011	Stoke City	Win	1–0	Away	Rodallega 78'	27,566	Report

=== League Cup ===
Round	Date	Opponent	Result	Score	Venue	Scorers	Attendance	Match Report
Round 2	24 August 2010	Hartlepool United	Win	0–3	Away	Collins 3' (o.g.), Gómez 77', Moses 86'	3,196 (281 away)	Report
Round 3	22 September 2010	Preston North End	Win	2–1	Home	Gómez 86', N'Zogbia 90+1'	6,987	Report
Round 4	26 October 2010	Swansea City	Win	2–0	Home	Boselli 52', Watson 90+2' (pen.)	11,705	Report
quarter-final	30 November 2010	Arsenal	Lose	2–0	Away		59,525 (510 away)	Report

=== FA Cup ===
Round	Date	Opponent	Result	Score	Venue	Scorers	Attendance	Match Report
Round 3	8 January 2011	Hull City	Win	2–3	Away	Diamé 21', 77', McManaman 56'	10,433 (710 away)	Report
Round 4	29 January 2011	Bolton Wanderers	Draw	0–0	Away		14,950 (2,937 away)	Report
Round 4 (R)	16 February 2011	Bolton Wanderers	Lose	0–1	Home		7,515	Report

== Player statistics ==
As of 24 April 2011

#	Pos.	Player	League		FA Cup		League Cup		Total		Discipline	
#	Pos.	Player	Apps	Goals	Apps	Goals	Apps	Goals	Apps	Goals	Yellow card	Red card
1	GK	(England) Chris Kirkland	4	0	0	0	0	0	4	0	0	0
2	DF	(Ivory Coast) Steve Gohouri	26+1	1	0	0	1	0	27	0	9	0
3	DF	(Paraguay) Antolín Alcaraz	34	1	0	0	4	0	38	1	5	1
4	MF	(Republic of Ireland) James McCarthy	24	3	0+1	0	0+2	0	24 (3)	3	2	0
5	DF	(Scotland) Gary Caldwell	23	0	2	0	1	0	26	0	6	1
6	MF	(Honduras) Hendry Thomas	22+2	0	2	0	4	0	27+2	0	7	0
7	FW	(Argentina) Franco Di Santo	9+16	1	0+1	0	1 (1)	0	11+18	1	2	0
8	MF	(England) Ben Watson	23+6	3	1	0	4	1	29+6	4	3	0
9	FW	(Argentina) Mauro Boselli	5+3	0	0	0	4	1	9+3	1	0	0
10	MF	(France) Charles N'Zogbia	32+2	9	0	0	0+4	1	32+5	10	2	1
11	FW	(Nigeria) Victor Moses	8+13	1	1+1	0	2+1	1	11+15	2	1	0
12	GK	(England) Mike Pollitt	0+1	0	2	0	0	0	2+1	0	0	0
13	DF	(Scotland) Steven Caldwell	8+2	0	2	0	3	0	13+2	0	2	0
14	MF	(Spain) Jordi Gómez	9+4	1	3	0	3+1	2	15+5	3	0	0
15	MF	(England) Tom Cleverley	19+6	3	0	0	0	0	23+6	3	1	0
16	MF	(Scotland) James McArthur	3+15	0	3	0	3	0	9+15	0	2	0
17	DF	(Barbados) Emmerson Boyce	20+2	0	2	0	1	0	23+2	0	3	0
18	FW	(Trinidad and Tobago) Jason Scotland	0	0	0	0	0	0	0	0	0	0
18	FW	(Republic of Ireland) Conor Sammon	1+6	1	0	0	0	0	1+6	1	0	0
20	FW	(Colombia) Hugo Rodallega	34+2	9	0	0	1	0	35+2	9	4	1
21	MF	(France) Mohamed Diamé	30+6	1	3	2	1	0	33+6	3	6	0
23	DF	(Netherlands) Ronnie Stam	17+8	1	0	0	3	0	22+8	1	2	0
24	DF	(Spain) Adrián López	1	0	3	0	0	0	4	0	0	0
26	GK	(Oman) Ali Al-Habsi	34	0	1	0	4	0	39	0	0	0
28	MF	(Netherlands) Daniël de Ridder	0	0	1	0	0	0	1	0	0	0
31	DF	(Honduras) Maynor Figueroa	32+1	1	2	0	4	0	36+1	1	11	0
32	DF	(England) Jordan Robinson	0	0	0+1	0	0	0	0+1	0	0	0
35	DF	(Spain) Román Golobart	0	0	0	0	0	0	0	0	0	0
38	FW	(England) Callum McManaman	0+3	0	3	1	0+1	0	3+4	1	0	0
39	DF	(England) Jordan Mustoe	0	0	0+1	0	0	0	0+1	0	0	0
41	MF	(England) Daniel Redmond	0	0	0+1	0	0	0	0+1	0	0	0
43	DF	(England) Adam Buxton	0	0	0	0	0	0	0	0	0	0
46	GK	(England) Lee Nicholls	0	0	0	0	0	0	0	0	0	0
51	MF	(England) Callum Morris	0	0	0	0	0	0	0	0	0	0
