= 2011–12 Wigan Athletic F.C. season =

Wigan Athletic
- Chairman: Dave Whelan
- Manager: Roberto Martínez
- Premier League: 15th
- FA Cup: Third round (eliminated by Swindon Town)
- League Cup: Second round (eliminated by Crystal Palace)
- Top goalscorer: League: Franco Di Santo (7); All: Franco Di Santo (7)
Home colours	Away colours	Third colours

The 2011–12 English football season is Wigan Athletic's seventh consecutive season in the Premier League. The club also competed in the League Cup and the FA Cup.

At the end of the 2011–12 Premier League, Wigan Athletic finished in 15th place, two points below 14th-placed Stoke City. Wigan's last game of the Premier League season was a 3–2 victory against already-relegated Wolverhampton Wanderers.

== Season review ==
=== Summary ===
Wigan Athletic had a tough season, spending much of it in the relegation zone and often in the bottom two. They had eight consecutive losses, between 10 September and 6 November, until earning a draw against fellow strugglers Blackburn Rovers on 19 November. Wigan were rock-bottom from 15 October to 26 November, when winning against Sunderland. They started to improve afterwards, accumulating some points during the Christmas period, but returned to losing ways with four-straight losses, all in January. Once again, after the defeat against Tottenham Hotspur on 31 January, Wigan were bottom in the table. After winning against fellow strugglers Wanderers, Wigan remained bottom on goal difference.

In March, Wigan greatly improved, first losing against Swansea City but earning draws against Aston Villa and West Bromwich Albion. But it was from late March onwards when Wigan completely transformed themselves. They earned wins against Liverpool and Stoke City before a controversial 2–1 defeat against Chelsea, where both of Chelsea's goals were from an offside position. Nevertheless, Wigan were in very strong form and made history after beating Manchester United for the first time. This was followed by their first-ever away win against Arsenal, a defeat to Fulham and their biggest win in the Premier League, a 4–0 demolition of Newcastle United (who were chasing UEFA Champions League football). On 7 May, in their penultimate game of the season, Wigan defeated Blackburn to retain their Premier League status and seal Blackburn's relegation. Their last game of the season was a 3–2 win against fellow relegated side Wolverhampton Wanderers. Wigan recorded seven wins in their last nine matches.

== Transfers ==
=== Players in ===
Date	Player	From	Fee
4 July 2011	(Oman) Ali Al-Habsi	(England) Bolton Wanderers	£4,000,000
3 August 2011	(England) David Jones	(England) Wolverhampton Wanderers	Free
12 August 2011	(France) Nouha Dicko	(France) Strasbourg	Free
30 August 2011	(Spain) Albert Crusat	(Spain) Almería	Undisclosed
31 August 2011	(Scotland) Shaun Maloney	(Scotland) Celtic	£1,000,000
31 August 2011	(Netherlands) Patrick van Aanholt	(England) Chelsea	Loan
25 January 2012	(Chile) Jean Beausejour	(England) Birmingham City	£2,500,000

=== Players out ===
Date	Player	To	Fee
	(Wales) Jason Koumas	Unattached	Released
	(Scotland) Steven Caldwell	(England) Birmingham City	Free
	(Spain) Antonio Amaya	(Spain) Real Betis	Undisclosed
	(Netherlands) Daniël de Ridder	(Switzerland) Grasshopper	Released
	(England) Joseph Holt	Unattached	Released
	(England) Daniel Lambert	Unattached	Released
	(England) Thomas Oakes	Unattached	Released
	(Spain) Abián Serrano Dávila	Unattached	Released
	(France) Charles N'Zogbia	(England) Aston Villa	£9,500,000
	(Spain) Román Golobart	(Scotland) Inverness Caledonian Thistle	Five-month loan
	(England) Callum McManaman	(England) Blackpool	Loan
	(England) Daniel Redmond	(Scotland) Hamilton Academical	Loan
	(France) Nouha Dicko	(England) Blackpool	Loan
	(England) Jordan Mustoe	(England) Barnet	Loan

== Competitions ==
=== Preseason ===
16 July 2011	Östersund	1 – 2	Wigan Athletic	Jämtkraft Arena, Sweden
20:00	Shaze 50' (pen.)		Moses 29'; Boselli 68'	Attendance: 1,949 (93 away)

24 July 2011	Al Ain	0 – 0	Wigan Athletic	Bischofshofen, Austria
17:00				Attendance: 418

27 July 2011	Wigan Athletic	2 – 0	Al-Ahli	Leogang, Austria
16:30	Moses 9', 25'

31 July 2011	Preston North End	1 – 3	Wigan Athletic	Deepdale, England
15:00	Linganzi 27'		McCarthy 1'; Moses 8'; Boyce 30'	Attendance: 5,749 (1,733 away)

7 August 2011	Wigan Athletic	1 – 0	Villarreal	DW Stadium, England
16:00	Moses 45+1'

=== Premier League ===
13 August 2011 1	Wigan Athletic	1–1	Norwich City	Wigan
15:00	Watson 21' (pen.)	Report	Hoolahan 45'	Stadium: DW Stadium; Attendance: 17,454; Referee: Stuart Attwell

20 August 2011 2	Swansea City	0–0	Wigan Athletic	Swansea
15:00		Report		Stadium: Liberty Stadium; Attendance: 19,028; Referee: Phil Dowd

27 August 2011 3	Wigan Athletic	2–0	Queens Park Rangers	Wigan
12:30	López (yellow card) 33'; Di Santo 41', 66'; Caldwell (yellow card) 77'	Report		Stadium: DW Stadium; Attendance: 17,225; Referee: Michael Oliver

10 September 2011 4	Manchester City	3–0	Wigan Athletic	Manchester
15:00	Agüero 13', 63', 69'	Report		Stadium: City of Manchester Stadium; Attendance: 46,509; Referee: Martin Atkinson

17 September 2011 5	Everton	3–1	Wigan Athletic	Liverpool
15:00	Jagielka 33'; Vellios 84'; Drenthe 90+2'	Report	Di Santo 31'	Stadium: Goodison Park; Attendance: 31,576; Referee: Peter Walton

24 September 2011 6	Wigan Athletic	1–2	Tottenham Hotspur	Wigan
15:00	Diamé 50'	Report	Van der Vaart 3'; Bale 23'	Stadium: DW Stadium; Attendance: 18,778; Referee: Jonathan Moss

1 October 2011 7	Aston Villa	2–0	Wigan Athletic	Birmingham
15:00	Agbonlahor 38'; Bent 60'	Report		Stadium: Villa Park; Attendance: 30,744; Referee: Mark Clattenburg

15 October 2011 8	Wigan Athletic	1–3	Bolton Wanderers	Wigan
15:00	Diamé 40'	Report	Reo-Coker 4'; Ngog 45+3'; Eagles 90+2'	Stadium: DW Stadium; Attendance: 17,261; Referee: Mike Dean

22 October 2011 9	Newcastle United	1–0	Wigan Athletic	Newcastle
15:00	Cabaye 81'	Report		Stadium: St James' Park; Attendance: 48,321; Referee: Neil Swarbrick

29 October 2011 10	Wigan Athletic	0–2	Fulham	Wigan
15:00		Report	Dempsey 41'; Dembélé 86'	Stadium: DW Stadium; Attendance: 15,796; Referee: Mike Jones

6 November 2011 11	Wolverhampton Wanderers	3–1	Wigan Athletic	Wolverhampton
13:30 GMT	O'Hara 31', (yellow card) 80'; Edwards 55'; Ward 66'; Hunt (yellow card) 78'	Report	Alcaraz (yellow card) 26'; Watson 42'	Stadium: Molineux; Attendance: 2,353; Referee: Lee Probert

19 November 2011 12	Wigan Athletic	3–3	Blackburn Rovers	Wigan
15:00 GMT	Gómez 7'; Caldwell 31'; Crusat 88'	Report	Yakubu 2', 90+9' (pen.); Hoilett 59'	Stadium: DW Stadium; Attendance: 17,329; Referee: Marriner

26 November 2011 13	Sunderland	1–2	Wigan Athletic	Sunderland
15:00 GMT	Larsson 8'	Report	Gómez 44' (pen.); Di Santo 90+3'	Stadium: Stadium of Light; Attendance: 37,883; Referee: Friend

3 December 2011 14	Wigan Athletic	0–4	Arsenal	Wigan
15:00 GMT		Report	Arteta 28'; Vermaelen 29'; Gervinho 61'; Van Persie 78'	Stadium: DW Stadium; Attendance: 19,280; Referee: Clattenburg

10 December 2011 15	West Bromwich Albion	1–2	Wigan Athletic	West Bromwich
15:00 GMT	Reid 33'	Report	Moses 37'; Gómez 57' (pen.)	Stadium: The Hawthorns; Attendance: 25,446; Referee: Dean

17 December 2011 16	Wigan Athletic	1–1	Chelsea	Wigan
15:00 GMT	Gómez 88'	Report	Sturridge 59'	Stadium: DW Stadium; Attendance: 18,320; Referee: Martin Atkinson

21 December 2011 17	Wigan Athletic	0–0	Liverpool	Wigan
20:00 GMT		Report		Stadium: DW Stadium; Attendance: 19,230; Referee: Michael Oliver

26 December 2011 18	Manchester United	5–0	Wigan Athletic	Manchester
15:00 GMT	Park 8'; Berbatov 41', 58', 78' (pen.); Valencia 75'	Report		Stadium: Old Trafford; Attendance: 75,183; Referee: Phil Dowd

31 December 2011 19	Stoke City	2–2	Wigan Athletic	Stoke-on-Trent
15:00 GMT	Walters 77' (pen.); Jerome 84'	Report	Moses 45'; Watson 87' (pen.)	Stadium: Britannia Stadium; Attendance: 26,595; Referee: Michael Oliver

3 January 2012 20	Wigan Athletic	1–4	Sunderland	Wigan
19:45 GMT	Rodallega 62'	Report	Gardner 45+4'; McClean 55'; Sessègnon 73'; Vaughan 80'	Stadium: DW Stadium; Attendance: 15,871; Referee: Mike Dean

16 January 2012 21	Wigan Athletic	0–1	Manchester City	Wigan
19:45 GMT		Report	Džeko 22'	Stadium: DW Stadium; Attendance: 16,026; Referee: Martin Atkinson

21 January 2012 22	Queens Park Rangers	3–1	Wigan Athletic	London
15:00 GMT	Helguson 33' (pen.); Buzsáky 45'; Smith 81'	Report	Rodallega 66'	Stadium: Loftus Road; Attendance: 16,002; Referee: Jonathan Moss

31 January 2012 23	Tottenham Hotspur	3–1	Wigan Athletic	London
20:00 GMT	Bale 29', 64'; Modrić 34'	Report	McArthur 80'	Stadium: White Hart Lane; Attendance: 35,801; Referee: Lee Probert

4 February 2012 24	Wigan Athletic	1–1	Everton	Wigan
15:00 GMT	Neville 73' (o.g.)	Report	Anichebe 83'	Stadium: DW Stadium; Attendance: 18,340; Referee: Anthony Taylor

11 February 2012 25	Bolton Wanderers	1–2	Wigan Athletic	Bolton
15:00 GMT	M. Davies 67'	Report	Caldwell 43'; McArthur 76'	Stadium: Reebok Stadium; Attendance: 23,450; Referee: Howard Webb

25 February 2012 26	Wigan Athletic	0–0	Aston Villa	Wigan
15:00 GMT		Report		Stadium: DW Stadium; Attendance: 20,601; Referee: Friend

3 March 2012 27	Wigan Athletic	0–2	Swansea City	Wigan
15:00 GMT		Report	Sigurðsson 45+2', 54'	Stadium: DW Stadium; Attendance: 19,001; Referee: Marriner

11 March 2012 28	Norwich	1–1	Wigan Athletic	Norwich
16:00 GMT	Hoolahan 10', (yellow card) 55'; Holt (yellow card) 43'; Whitbread (yellow card) 61'; Drury (yellow card) 72'	Report	Moses 68', (yellow card) 90+3'; McCarthy (yellow card) 79'; Alcaraz (yellow card) 81'; McArthur (yellow card) 90+5'	Stadium: Carrow Road; Attendance: 26,653; Referee: Friend

17 March 2012 29	Wigan Athletic	1–1	West Bromwich Albion	Wigan
15:00 GMT	McArthur 54'	Report	Scharner 65'	Stadium: DW Stadium; Attendance: 21,379; Referee: Oliver

24 March 2012 30	Liverpool	1–2	Wigan Athletic	Liverpool
15:00 GMT	Suárez 47', (yellow card) 54'	Report	Maloney 30' (pen.); Di Santo (yellow card) 43'; Figueroa (yellow card) 53'; Caldwell 63'	Stadium: Anfield; Attendance: 44,431; Referee: Mason

31 March 2012 31	Wigan Athletic	2–0	Stoke City	Wigan
15:00 GMT	Alcaraz 54'; Moses 90+3'	Report		Stadium: DW Stadium; Attendance: 19,786; Referee: Mark Clattenburg

7 April 2012 32	Chelsea	2–1	Wigan Athletic	London
15:00 GMT	Ivanović 62'; Mata 90+3'	Report	Diamé 82'	Stadium: Stamford Bridge; Attendance: 40,651; Referee: Jones

11 April 2012 33	Wigan Athletic	1–0	Manchester United	Wigan
19:45 GMT	Di Santo (yellow card) 22'; Maloney 50'	Report	Evans (yellow card) 22'; Jones (yellow card) 85'	Stadium: DW Stadium; Attendance: 18,115; Referee: Phil Dowd

16 April 2012 34	Arsenal	1–2	Wigan Athletic	London
20:00 GMT	Vermaelen 21'; Sagna (yellow card) 33'; Song (yellow card) 72'	Report	Di Santo 7'; Gómez 8'; Caldwell (yellow card) 59'; Al-Habsi (yellow card) 90+1'; McArthur (yellow card) 90+5'	Stadium: Emirates Stadium; Attendance: 60,060; Referee: Andre Marriner

21 April 2012 35	Fulham	2–1	Wigan Athletic	London
15:00 GMT	Pogrebnyak 58'; Senderos 89'	Report	Boyce 57'	Stadium: Craven Cottage; Attendance: 25,689; Referee: Lee Mason

28 April 2012 36	Wigan Athletic	4–0	Newcastle United	Wigan
15:00 GMT	Moses 13', 15'; Maloney 36'; Di Santo 45'	Report		Stadium: DW Stadium; Attendance: 22,187; Referee: Mike Dean

7 May 2012 37	Blackburn Rovers	0–1	Wigan Athletic	Blackburn
20:00 GMT		Report	Alcaraz 87'	Stadium: Ewood Park; Attendance: 26,144; Referee: Mark Clattenburg

13 May 2012 38	Wigan Athletic	3–2	Wolverhampton Wanderers	Wigan
15:00 GMT	Di Santo 12'; Boyce 14', 79'	Report	Jarvis 9'; Fletcher 86'	Stadium: DW Stadium; Attendance: 21,986; Referee: Oliver

==== League table ====
Matchday	1	2	3	4	5	6	7	8	9	10	11	12	13	14	15	16	17	18	19	20	21	22	23	24	25	26	27	28	29	30	31	32	33	34	35	36	37	38
Ground	H	A	H	A	A	H	A	H	A	H	A	H	A	H	A	H	H	A	A	H	H	A	A	H	A	H	H	A	H	A	H	A	H	A	A	H	A	H
Result	D	D	W	L	L	L	L	L	L	L	L	D	W	L	W	D	D	L	D	L	L	L	L	D	W	D	L	D	D	W	W	L	W	W	L	W	W	W
Position	8	12	8	9	15	15	18	19	19	20	20	20	19	20	18	18	18	18	18	19	20	20	20	20	20	20	20	20	19	19	19	19	17	16	17	16	15	15

Source: WorldFootball.com
A = Away; H = Home; W = Win; D = Draw; L = Loss

Pos	Team	Pld	W	D	L	GF	GA	GD	Pts
13	Sunderland	38	11	12	15	45	46	−1	45
14	Stoke City	38	11	12	15	36	53	−17	45
15	Wigan Athletic	38	11	10	17	42	62	−20	43
16	Aston Villa	38	7	17	14	37	53	−16	38
17	Queens Park Rangers	38	10	7	21	43	66	−23	37

Source: Barclays Premier League
Rules for classification: 1) points; 2) goal difference; 3) number of goals scored.

=== League Cup ===
13 September 2011 Second Round	Crystal Palace	2–1	Wigan Athletic	Selhurst Park
19:45	Ambrose 24'; Williams 30'		Watson 90+2'	Attendance: 7,649

=== FA Cup ===
7 January 2012 Third Round	Swindon Town	2 – 1	Wigan Athletic	County Ground
15:00	Connell 40'; Benson 76'		McManaman 35'	Attendance: 13,238

== Players ==
=== Captains ===
No.	P	Name	Country	No. games	Notes
5	DF	Gary Caldwell	(Scotland)	37	Club captain
3	DF	Antolín Alcaraz	(Paraguay)	1	

Last updated: 6 June 2011
Source: Competitive match reports.
Competitive matches only
Matches started as captain only
Country: FIFA nationality; No.: Squad number; P: Position; Name: Player name; No. Games: Number of games started as captain.

=== Appearances and goals ===
As of 1 June 2012

No.	Pos	Nat	Player	Total		Premier League		FA Cup		League Cup	
No.	Pos	Nat	Player	Apps	Goals	Apps	Goals	Apps	Goals	Apps	Goals
1	GK	(England) ENG	Chris Kirkland	0	0	0	0	0	0	0	0
2	DF	(Ivory Coast) CIV	Steve Gohouri	10	0	8+2	0	0	0	0	0
3	DF	(Paraguay) PAR	Antolín Alcaraz	25	2	25	2	0	0	0	0
4	MF	(Republic of Ireland) IRL	James McCarthy	34	0	33	0	0	0	1	0
5	DF	(Scotland) SCO	Gary Caldwell	37	3	36	3	1	0	0	0
6	MF	(Honduras) HON	Hendry Thomas	2	0	0	0	1	0	1	0
7	MF	(Spain) ESP	Albert Crusat	16	1	4+11	1	0	0	1	0
8	MF	(England) ENG	Ben Watson	23	4	14+7	3	1	0	0+1	1
9	FW	(Argentina) ARG	Franco Di Santo	33	7	24+8	7	1	0	0	0
10	MF	(Scotland) SCO	Shaun Maloney	15	3	8+5	3	1	0	1	0
11	FW	(Nigeria) NGR	Victor Moses	39	6	36+2	6	0+1	0	0	0
12	GK	(England) ENG	Mike Pollitt	0	0	0	0	0	0	0	0
13	GK	(England) ENG	Lee Nicholls	0	0	0	0	0	0	0	0
14	MF	(Spain) ESP	Jordi Gómez	29	5	24+4	5	0+1	0	0	0
15	FW	(England) ENG	Callum McManaman	4	1	0+2	0	1	1	0+1	0
16	MF	(Scotland) SCO	James McArthur	33	3	18+13	3	1	0	1	0
17	DF	(Barbados) BRB	Emmerson Boyce	27	3	26	3	1	0	0	0
18	FW	(Republic of Ireland) IRL	Conor Sammon	27	1	8+17	1	0+1	0	1	0
19	MF	(England) ENG	David Jones	17	0	13+3	0	0	0	1	0
20	FW	(Colombia) COL	Hugo Rodallega	23	2	11+12	2	0	0	0	0
21	MF	(Senegal) SEN	Mohamed Diamé	26	3	18+8	3	0+0	0	0+0	0
22	MF	(Chile) CHI	Jean Beausejour	16	0	16	0	0	0	0	0
23	DF	(Netherlands) NED	Ronnie Stam	20	0	13+7	0	0	0	0	0
24	DF	(Spain) ESP	Adrián López	7	0	5	0	1	0	1	0
26	GK	(Oman) OMA	Ali Al-Habsi	40	0	38	0	1	0	1	0
30	MF	(France) FRA	Nouha Dicko	1	0	0	0	0	0	0+1	0
31	DF	(Honduras) HON	Maynor Figueroa	39	0	37+1	0	0	0	1	0
39	DF	(England) ENG	Jordan Mustoe	1	0	0	0	1	0	0	0
41	DF	(England) ENG	Daniel Redmond	0	0	0	0	0	0	0	0
43	DF	(England) ENG	Adam Buxton	0	0	0	0	0	0	0	0
Players that played for Wigan this season that have left the club:
22	DF	(Netherlands) NED	Patrick van Aanholt	4	0	3	0	0	0	1	0

=== Top scorers ===
Position	Nation	Number	Name	Premier League	FA Cup	League Cup	Total
FW	(Argentina)	9	Franco Di Santo	7	0	0	7
FW	(Nigeria)	11	Victor Moses	6	0	0	6
MF	(Spain)	14	Jordi Gómez	5	0	0	5
MF	(England)	8	Ben Watson	3	0	1	4
DF	(Scotland)	5	Gary Caldwell	3	0	0	3
MF	(Senegal)	21	Mohamed Diamé	3	0	0	3
MF	(Scotland)	16	James McArthur	3	0	0	3
MF	(Scotland)	10	Shaun Maloney	3	0	0	3
DEF	(Barbados)	17	Emmerson Boyce	3	0	0	3
FW	(Colombia)	20	Hugo Rodallega	2	0	0	2
DF	(Paraguay)	3	Antolín Alcaraz	1	0	0	1
MF	(Spain)	7	Albert Crusat	1	0	0	1
FW	(England)	15	Callum McManaman	0	1	0	1
			Totals	41	1	1	43

=== Disciplinary record ===
Includes all competitive matches

Last updated 20 April 2012

Number	Nation	Position	Name	Premiership		FA Cup		League Cup		Total	
Number	Nation	Position	Name	Booked	Sent off (straight red)	Booked	Sent off (straight red)	Booked	Sent off (straight red)	Booked	Sent off (straight red)
5	(Scotland)	DF	Gary Caldwell	8	1	0	0	0	0	8	1
2	(Ivory Coast)	DF	Steve Gohouri	3	1	0	0	0	0	3	1
18	(Republic of Ireland)	FW	Conor Sammon	1	1	0	0	0	0	1	1
4	(Scotland)	MF	James McCarthy	6	0	0	0	0	0	6	0
31	(Honduras)	DF	Maynor Figueroa	6	0	0	0	0	0	6	0
3	(Paraguay)	DF	Antolín Alcaraz	4	0	0	0	0	0	4	0
21	(Senegal)	MF	Mohamed Diamé	4	0	0	0	0	0	4	0
14	(Spain)	MF	Jordi Gómez	4	0	0	0	0	0	4	0
9	(Argentina)	FW	Franco Di Santo	4	0	0	0	0	0	4	0
16	(Scotland)	MF	James McArthur	4	0	0	0	0	0	4	0
11	(Nigeria)	MF	Victor Moses	3	0	0	0	0	0	3	0
23	(Netherlands)	DF	Ronnie Stam	3	0	0	0	0	0	3	0
17	(Barbados)	DF	Emmerson Boyce	2	0	0	0	0	0	2	0
19	(England)	MF	David Jones	2	0	0	0	0	0	2	0
8	(England)	MF	Ben Watson	1	0	1	0	0	0	2	0
26	(Oman)	GK	Ali Al-Habsi	1	0	1	0	0	0	2	0
22	(Chile)	MF	Jean Beausejour	1	0	0	0	0	0	1	0
7	(Spain)	MF	Albert Crusat	1	0	0	0	0	0	1	0
24	(Spain)	DF	Adrián López	1	0	0	0	0	0	1	0
10	(Scotland)	MF	Shaun Maloney	1	0	0	0	0	0	1	0
15	(England)	FW	Callum McManaman	1	0	0	0	0	0	1	0
20	(Colombia)	FW	Hugo Rodallega	1	0	0	0	0	0	1	0
6	(Honduras)	MF	Hendry Thomas	0	0	1	0	0	0	1	0
			TOTALS	61	3	3	0	0	0	64	3

=== Suspensions served ===
Date	Matches Missed	Player	Reason	Opponents Missed
24 September 2011	3	Steve Gohouri	Sent off vs Tottenham Hotspur	Aston Villa (A), Bolton Wanderers (H), Newcastle United (A)
29 October 2011	1	Gary Caldwell	Reached five yellow cards	Wolverhampton Wanderers (A)
7 November 2011	3	Antolín Alcaraz	FA Charge – Spitting offense	Blackburn Rovers (H), Sunderland (A), Arsenal (H)
26 December 2011	3	Conor Sammon	Sent off vs Manchester United	Stoke City (A), Sunderland (H), Swindon Town (A)
31 December 2011	1	Gary Caldwell	Sent off vs Stoke City	Sunderland (H)
11 February 2012	1	James McCarthy	Reached five yellow cards	Aston Villa (H)
7 April 2012	1	Maynor Figueroa	Reached five yellow cards	Manchester United (H)

- ^1 The red card was successfully appealed and the punishment wasn't served.
