= Tom Cleverley =

English association football player (born 1989)

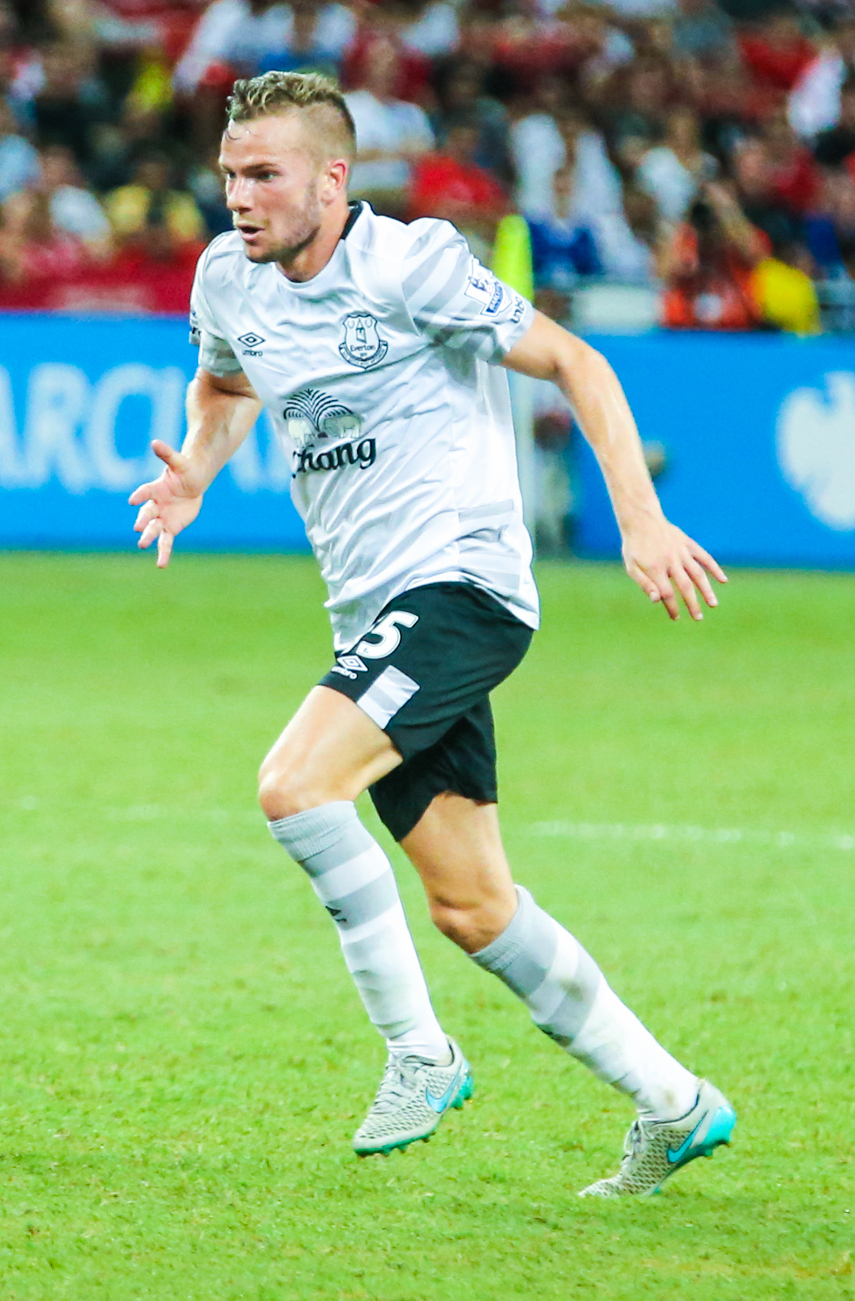
- Cleverley playing for Everton in 2015

Personal information
- Full name: Thomas William Cleverley
- Date of birth: 12 August 1989 (age 37)
- Place of birth: Basingstoke, Hampshire, England
- Height: 5 ft 9 in (1.75 m)
- Position: Midfielder

Team information
- Current team: Plymouth Argyle (head coach)

Youth career
- 1998–2000: Bradford City
- 2000–2008: Manchester United

Senior career*
Years	Team	Apps	(Gls)
2008–2015	Manchester United	55	(3)
2009	→ Leicester City (loan)	15	(2)
2009–2010	→ Watford (loan)	33	(11)
2010–2011	→ Wigan Athletic (loan)	25	(4)
2014–2015	→ Aston Villa (loan)	31	(3)
2015–2017	Everton	32	(2)
2017	→ Watford (loan)	17	(0)
2017–2023	Watford	120	(8)
Total		328	(33)

International career
2009	England U20	1	(2)
2009–2011	England U21	16	(0)
2012	Great Britain Olympic	5	(0)
2012–2013	England	13	(0)

Managerial career
- 2024–2025: Watford
- 2025–: Plymouth Argyle
- * Club domestic league appearances and goals

Thomas William Cleverley (born 12 August 1989) is an English professional football coach and former player who played as a midfielder. He is currently the head coach of EFL League One club Plymouth Argyle.

After starting his career in the youth set-up at Bradford City, Cleverley joined Manchester United at the age of 12. He was loaned to League One club Leicester City at the start of 2009, helping the team win promotion as champions. He spent the 2009–10 season on loan with Watford in the Championship, where he scored 11 goals in 33 league matches and was voted as their Player of the Season. In August 2010, he joined Wigan Athletic on a season-long loan, where he scored four goals in 25 appearances and helped them to avoid relegation on the final day of the season. He returned to Manchester United for the start of the 2011–12 season and made his first competitive appearance as they won the FA Community Shield. He won the Premier League with Manchester United in 2013. After a loan to Aston Villa in 2014–15, his United contract expired and he signed for Everton. He moved to Watford in January 2017, initially on loan and joined the club permanently in July of that year. During his time with the club, he totalled 146 appearances for the club up to his retirement in July 2023.

Having represented England at under-20 and under-21 level, Cleverley played for Great Britain at the 2012 Summer Olympics, and later that year made his debut for the England national team. In 2014, he was named in the provisional England squad for the 2014 FIFA World Cup, but was omitted from the final list.

He began his coaching career at his final professional club, Watford, in March 2024, before getting dismissed and appointed as manager of Plymouth Argyle in June 2025.

== Club career ==
=== Early career ===
Tom Cleverley was born in Basingstoke, Hampshire, but grew up in Bradford, West Yorkshire. He went to Hanson School. He was part of Bradford City's youth set-up, but joined Manchester United as an 11-year-old trainee in July 2000.

During the 2005–06 season, he made nine appearances for the under-18 team. He was also a substitute for the reserve team's 4–1 away win over Everton on 21 February 2006. His first appearance for the reserves came in a 0–0 away draw to Bolton Wanderers almost a year later, on 15 February 2007, by which time he had become a regular in the under-18 team. However, just over a month later, he suffered a long-term injury and was ruled out for seven months.

He returned to action in October 2007, playing for the reserves in a 1–1 home draw with Liverpool. The 2007–08 season marked Cleverley's emergence as a regular in the Manchester United reserve team, making 21 appearances as the team went on to win both the Manchester Senior Cup and the Lancashire Senior Cup, in which he scored in the final against Liverpool. He also scored his first goals in a Manchester United shirt on 23 January 2008, when he scored both of United's goals in a 2–0 away win over Bolton Wanderers in the Premier Reserve League. His consistent performances for the reserves earned him the captaincy of the team in the absence of regular captain Sam Hewson, as well as a nomination for the Denzil Haroun Reserve Player of the Year award – he lost out to Richard Eckersley.

In recognition of his performances for the reserves, on 24 July 2008, Cleverley was called up to the Manchester United first team for the remainder of their tour of South Africa and the match against Portsmouth in Nigeria. He made his first-team debut against Kaizer Chiefs in the final of the 2008 Vodacom Challenge, coming on in place of Rodrigo Possebon at half-time, before he scored the third of United's four goals just after the hour mark.

He returned to regular reserve team duty for the 2008–09 season, but was given a first-team squad number – 35 – when the first-team squad list was announced on 15 August 2008, and was named on the bench for United's League Cup matches against Middlesbrough and Queens Park Rangers.

=== Loan spells ===
==== Leicester City ====
On 16 January 2009, Cleverley joined Leicester City on loan for the remainder of the 2008–09 season and was given the number 7 shirt.

He made his debut on 19 January 2009 in a 2–0 away win over Yeovil Town, coming on as an 85th-minute substitute for Matty Fryatt. Cleverley scored his first Leicester City goal few weeks later on 3 February 2009, in a 4–1 win over Walsall. Cleverley then scored his second goal for the club on 7 March 2009, in a 4–0 win over Cheltenham Town. After two goals in 15 matches for Leicester, Cleverley's loan spell came to a premature end after he suffered a season-ending shoulder injury against Colchester United. He then returned to Manchester United for treatment and underwent surgery on his shoulder on 2 April 2009. Although his loan had ended, Cleverley was presented with a medal on 24 April after Leicester secured their promotion as champions of League One.

Towards the end of the season, along with James Chester and Corry Evans, Cleverley was nominated by Manchester United reserve team manager Ole Gunnar Solskjær for the Denzil Haroun Reserve Player of the Year award.

==== Watford ====
After being featured and scoring in the pre–season friendly against Valencia, Cleverley was told by Alex Ferguson that he would be loaned out to gain further first-team experience. On 18 August 2009, Cleverley signed for Watford on loan and was able to play in their match away to Nottingham Forest that evening. He started the match and was booked within four minutes of the start of the second half, but then sealed a 4–2 win with a goal in the second minute of injury time at the end of the match.

He then scored another goal on his home debut four days later, scoring Watford's second goal in a 2–2 draw with Blackpool, and became Watford's joint-top scorer with the second goal in a 2–0 win over Preston North End in November. Shortly afterwards, he extended his loan deal at Watford until the end of the 2009–10 season.

Cleverley scored a further five goals in 20 appearances for Watford before a knee ligament injury in April 2010 ended his season prematurely. He went on to win the team's Player of the Season award.

==== Wigan Athletic ====
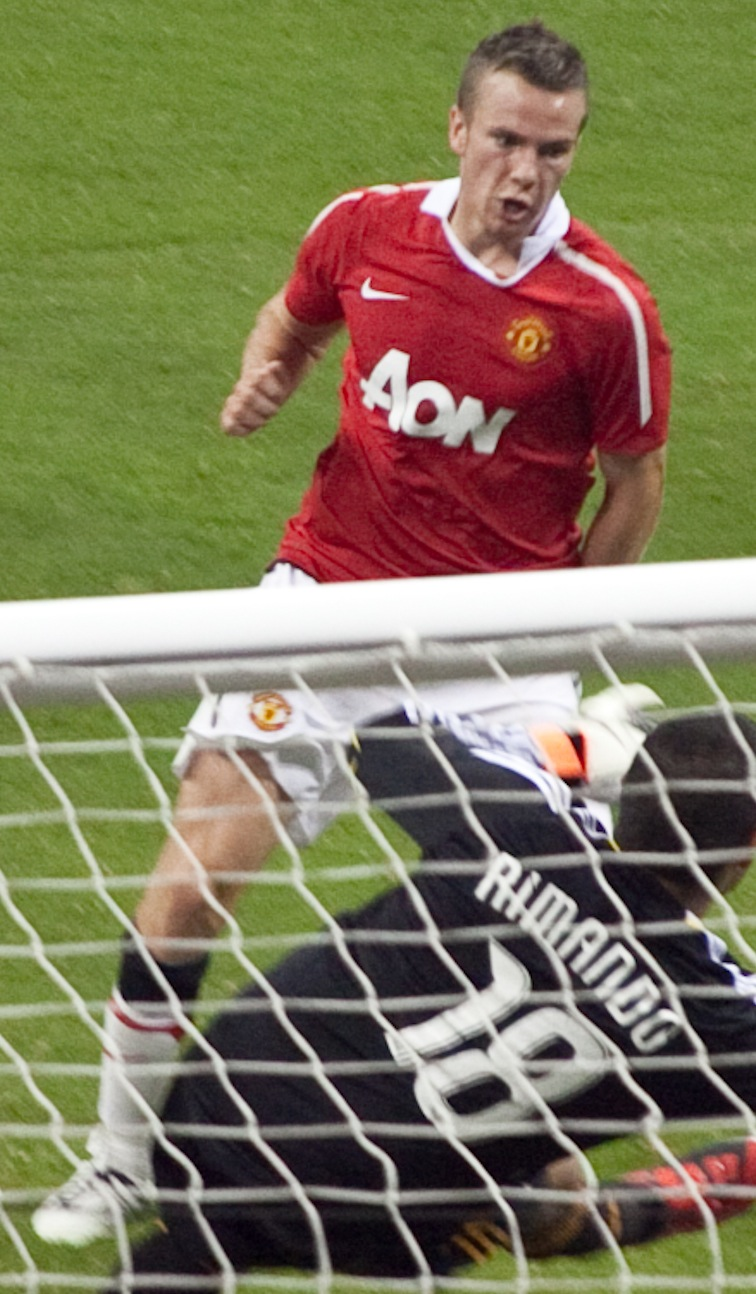
Cleverley (in red) playing for Manchester United in 2010

On 1 July 2010, Cleverley signed a new contract with the club, keeping him until 2013. Cleverley returned to Manchester United for the beginning of the 2010–11 season and travelled with the squad for their pre-season tour of North America in July 2010. He entered the match against Celtic in Toronto as a substitute for Ryan Giggs at half-time in the first match of the tour and scored United's third goal in a 3–1 win on 16 July. He then scored his second of the tour on 28 July 2010, scoring United's fourth in their 5–2 win in the 2010 MLS All-Star Game; he controlled Darren Fletcher's flick into the box before lifting the ball over Wilman Conde's head and side-footing it past Nick Rimando.

On 31 August 2010, Wigan Athletic confirmed they had agreed a season-long loan deal for Cleverley, with Manchester United retaining the option to recall the player from his loan spell in January.

On 11 September 2010, Cleverley made his debut for Wigan which was also his Premier League debut, replacing Mauro Boselli in the 75th minute and assisting Antolín Alcaraz in a 1–1 home draw against Sunderland. However, Cleverley suffered a knock, resulting a knee injury in training and was sidelined for weeks. Cleverley then made his first-team return on 16 October, coming on as a substitute for Ronnie Stam in the 79th minute, in a 2–2 draw against Newcastle United. On 27 November, he scored his first goal for the club, also his first ever Premier League goal, in a 3–1 defeat away to West Ham United. Seven days later he scored his second for Wigan and first home goal in a 2–2 draw against Stoke City. However, following a Dubious Goals Panel ruling, this goal was taken away from Cleverley and credited as a Rory Delap own goal.

On 31 January 2011, Manchester United agreed to let Cleverley stay on loan at Wigan until the end of the season. Cleverley scored the decisive goal in a 2–1 away win over Wolverhampton Wanderers which lifted Wigan out of the relegation zone. However, Cleverley suffered a hamstring injury that kept him out for a month. Cleverley then made his return from the first team on 5 February 2011, where he came on as a substitute for Victor Moses in the 67th minute, in a 4–3 win over Blackburn Rovers. After making return to the first team, Cleverley then scored and set up one of the goal, which turned out to be a winning goal, in a 2–1 win over Birmingham City on 19 March 2011.

Cleverley was one of Wigan's most prominent performers, ending the season with three goals and two assists in 25 league appearances.

=== Return to Manchester United ===
==== 2011–12 season ====
Following the retirement of Paul Scholes before the 2011–12 season, the Manchester United central midfield was left with an opening. Cleverley was identified by manager Alex Ferguson as a potential homegrown replacement for Scholes.

Cleverley was praised by Ferguson after playing the full 90 minutes in a 2–1 victory over Barcelona in a pre-season friendly. Ferguson said that Cleverley was United's "best player" against Barcelona and he indicated that there is a strong possibility that he could be among the starting 11 in the opening fixture of the 2011–12 Premier League season against West Bromwich Albion. Cleverley made his competitive debut for United in the 3–2 comeback win over derby rivals Manchester City in the 2011 FA Community Shield. He came on as a second-half substitute for Michael Carrick after United went 2–0 down at half time and provided the assist for Nani's equaliser.

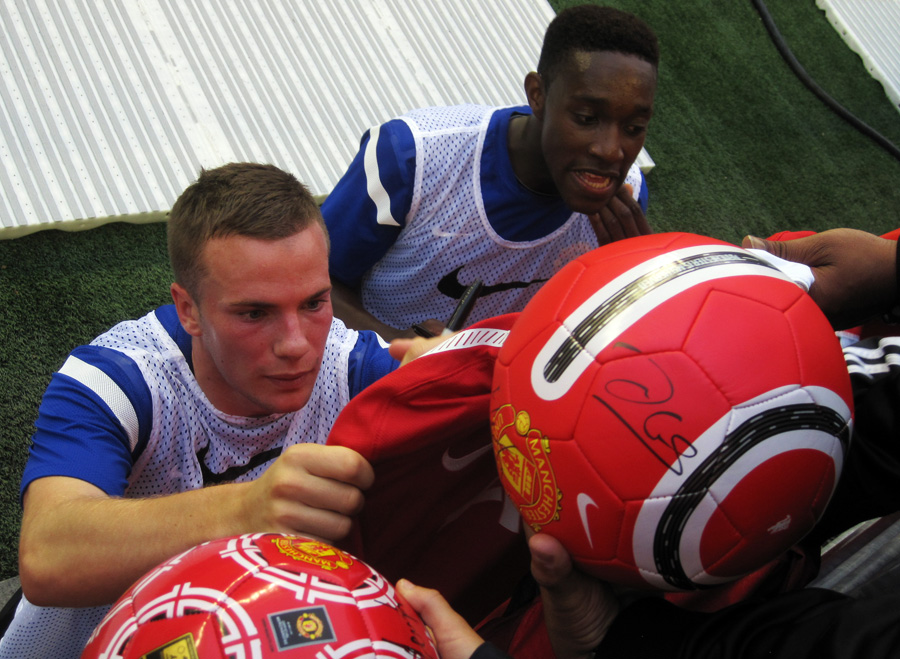
Cleverley signing Manchester United memorabilia alongside then-teammate Danny Welbeck in 2011

He started his first Premier League match for Manchester United on 14 August 2011, playing the full 90 minutes away to West Bromwich Albion in the first match of the 2011–12 season. After impressing in his opening match, Cleverley started Manchester United's second match of the campaign against Tottenham Hotspur on 22 August, getting an assist in the process. He played the full match against Arsenal on 28 August, which Manchester United won 8–2. Cleverley sustained a ligament damage in his foot after being tackled heavily by Bolton's Kevin Davies in the 3rd minute of United's next match, a 5–0 away victory at Bolton Wanderers. It was later confirmed by the club that he would be sidelined for a month with the injury.

The following month in October 2011, Cleverley signed a new contract keeping him at the club until 2015. On 25 October, Cleverley made his return from injury in the League Cup, a 3–0 win against Aldershot Town. He made another appearance four days later, away to Everton, where he played for 56 minutes and they went on to win 1–0. He left the field of play after 57 minutes due to an ankle injury, but his performance was later hailed by his manager, Alex Ferguson, as "outstanding". Although his injury was initially less serious than the one that kept him sidelined for weeks, Cleverley's injury had him sidelined even further until Christmas.

On 20 January 2012, Ferguson stated "I am hopeful in 10 days' time [Cleverley] will be training then [The team] can kick on." Cleverley was due to return for the match at Old Trafford against Liverpool on 11 February 2012, but he was an unused substitute. He eventually returned in a UEFA Europa League 2–0 away win against Ajax at the Amsterdam Arena. However, since his return, Cleverley appeared in the first team occasionally towards the end of the season and made seventeen appearances in all competitions. Despite this, Cleverley spoke about the season, stating: "I've had some bad luck and now I have just got to get on with it. From a great start it became the hardest season of my life. But it has made me mentally stronger."

==== 2012–13 season ====
On 26 September 2012, he scored his first goal, in a 2–1 win against Newcastle United in the League Cup. His first league goal was on 7 October, also against Newcastle United.

He scored his second league goal on 15 December with a fine first-time finish from the edge of the area in a 3–1 win against Sunderland. On 5 January 2013, Cleverley scored a goal from a Javier Hernández cross in a 2–2 draw against West Ham United in a third Round FA Cup tie. However, he struggled to regain his first-team place and spent most of the season on the substitutes' bench; nevertheless, he made 22 appearances, which was enough to earn him a Premier League winner's medal.

==== 2013–14 season ====
In the 2013–14 season, under the new management of David Moyes, Cleverley found himself competing in a midfielder spot with newly signed Marouane Fellaini and also began playing in a deep position. On 15 December 2013, Cleverley scored in a 3–0 victory over Aston Villa. Due to Manchester United's underperformance during the season, Cleverley came under strong criticism by Manchester United supporters and a petition was even created to ban Cleverley from being included for the England squad in 2014 FIFA World Cup. The petition was criticised by manager Moyes and Roy Hodgson. The criticism on Cleverley further increased when he was offered a new contract. Cleverley later ended the 2013–14 season, making 32 appearances and scoring once in all competitions.

With the new signings of Ander Herrera, Ángel Di María, Daley Blind, Luke Shaw and Radamel Falcao for the 2014–15 season, Cleverley found himself in an uncertain position within the Manchester United squad under new manager Louis van Gaal, who had taken over from Moyes over the summer. As such, he attracted interest from a number of clubs, including Aston Villa and Everton. Aston Villa made an initial bid of £8 million for Cleverley, but baulked at his wage demands. Everton then came in with an offer of £5 million that was rejected, before Villa revived their interest with a loan bid on 1 September 2014.

==== Aston Villa (loan) ====
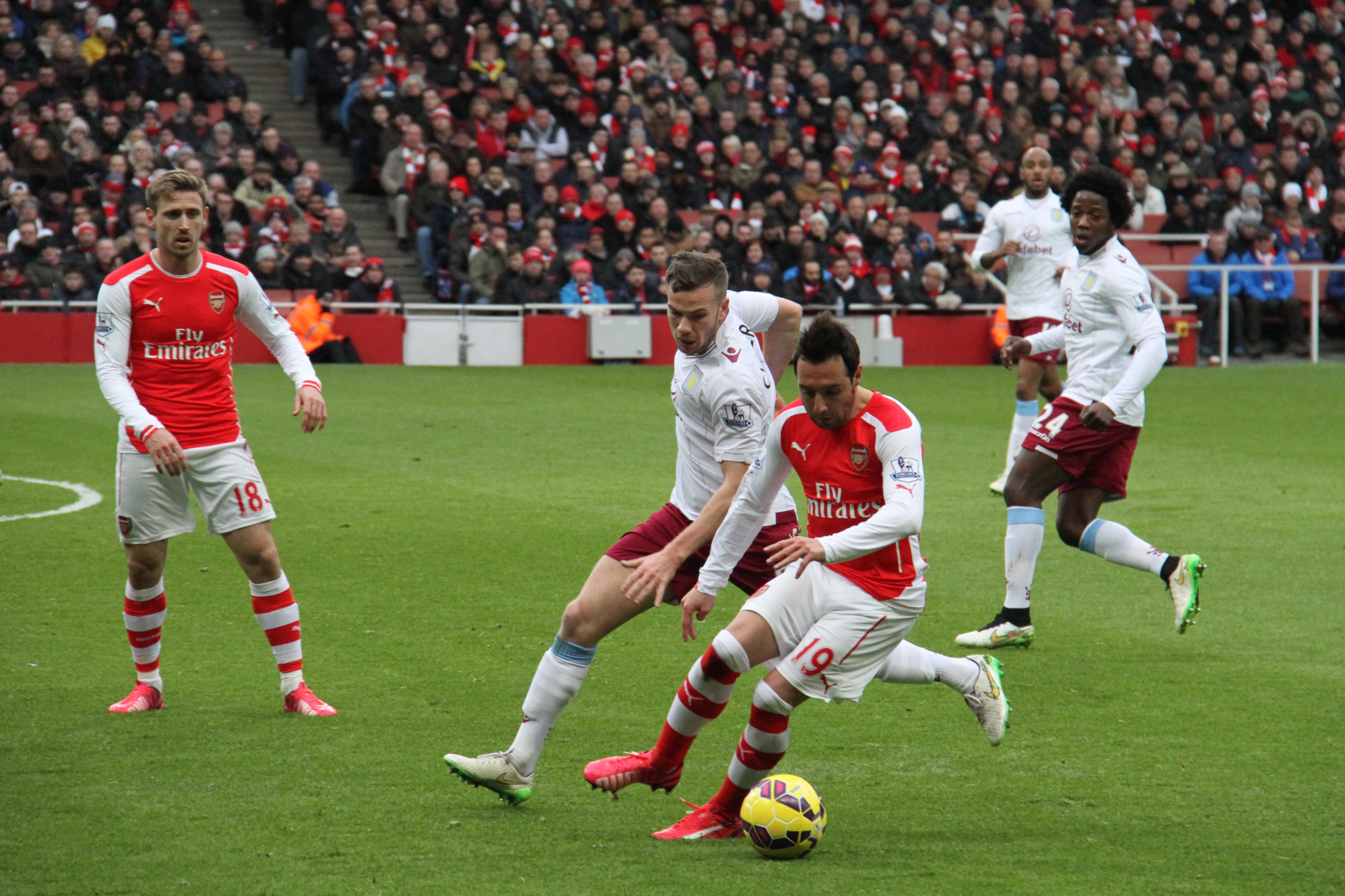
Cleverley (centre, in white) playing for Aston Villa in 2015 against Arsenal

The transfer was completed at around 01:15 in the morning of 2 September, shortly after the expiry of a two-hour extension to the transfer deadline granted by the Premier League, but the transfer was eventually ratified later that afternoon after Aston Villa argued that they had completed the relevant paperwork before the deadline. Following his loan move with just a year left on his United contract, Cleverley said that his career at Old Trafford was over.

Cleverley made his Aston Villa debut on 13 September 2014 in a 1–0 win over Liverpool. His manager, Paul Lambert, denied rumours that there was a clause in Cleverley's contract that he had to start when fit, and defended the player after he was cheered sarcastically by some Aston Villa supporters when substituted in matches. At one point, Cleverley's performance resulted a confrontation with then the club's assistant manager, Roy Keane. Cleverley lost his first-team place following a new management of Tim Sherwood, but managed to redeem himself soon after.

On 25 April 2015, he scored his first goal for the club in a 3–2 defeat to Manchester City. He scored again in the following match, a 3–2 win at home to Everton. He scored for the third match in a row for the first time in a 1–0 win at home to West Ham United. His performance helped the club avoid relegation and retained their Premier League status for another season. Cleverley played all six matches in Aston Villa's FA Cup campaign and started in the 2015 FA Cup Final at Wembley Stadium, where the team were defeated 4–0 by Arsenal on 30 May 2015.

With his contract expiring at the end of the 2014–15 season, Cleverley was expected to be among Manchester United players to leave the club for good. It was later confirmed that Cleverley was released by the club, along with four other players.

=== Everton ===
Following the expiration of his contract with Manchester United, Cleverley joined Everton on 1 July 2015, signing a five-year contract. Cleverley previously was on the verge of joining Aston Villa on a permanent basis, but was in favour of joining Everton at the end of the season.

Cleverley made his Everton debut in the opening match of the season, where he played in the left midfield position and played 90 minutes, in a 2–2 draw against Watford. However, during a match against Tottenham Hotspur, Cleverley suffered a malleolar injury and was sidelined between six and eight weeks. After two months without playing, Cleverley finally made his return to the first team against James McCarthy in the 68th minute, in a 3–3 draw against Bournemouth on 28 November 2015. Cleverley scored his first goal for the club on 26 December, when he headed in a last-minute winner for the Toffees against Newcastle United. Between 3 February and 6 February 2016, Cleverley provided three assists against Newcastle United (once) and Stoke City, which both of these matches were a 3–0 win. Cleverley then scored and set up one of the goal, in a 2–1 win over Bournemouth on 20 April. In his first season at Everton, Cleverley finished the season, making 22 appearances and scoring three times.

In his second season, however, Cleverley found himself behind a pecking order in the first team under the new management of Ronald Koeman. As a result, Cleverley found first team opportunities hard to come by, due to being "ill-suited to a team demanding strength, nous and 90-minute energy" as expected by Koeman and would appear on the substitutes bench. Having had his first team opportunities limited to five starts in twelve appearances without scoring, it was expected that Cleverley would leave the club in January.

=== Return to Watford and later retirement ===
On 12 January 2017, Cleverley joined Premier League club Watford on loan until the end of the 2016–17 season, with a view to a permanent transfer, after failing to establish himself at Everton. He re-debut for the club two days later, coming on as a second-half substitute, in a 0–0 draw against Middlesbrough. He then played a vital role in the next two matches against Bournemouth and Arsenal. Having quickly made an impact for the side, it was announced on 31 March that Cleverley would join Watford permanently on 1 July on a five-year contract for an undisclosed fee. At the end of the 2016–17 season, Cleverley went on to make 17 appearances for the Hornets.

In the 2017–18 season, Cleverley continued to feature in the first team regularly following the managerial appointment of Marco Silva and was expected to face competition for a place in the side. It was not until on 15 October 2017 when he scored his first goal for Watford (his first for the side in seven years during his loan spell), in a 2–1 win over Arsenal.

Having been relegated with Watford in the 2019–20 season, Cleverley won promotion with the club to the Premier League in the 2020–21 season. The following season, however, he was once again relegated back to the Championship with the club at the end of the 2021–22 season.

On 23 July 2022, ahead of the 2022–23 campaign, Cleverley was appointed club captain by then-Watford manager Rob Edwards, succeeding previous captain Troy Deeney who had left the club in August 2021, and was settled as the club’s primary captain. On 30 June 2023, it was announced that Cleverley had departed Watford upon the expiration of his contract, ending his six-year long spell with the club.

On 1 July, a day after leaving Watford, Cleverley announced his retirement from professional football as a result of past injuries. Later on 13 July, Watford announced that Cleverley would take up a position in the club's academy helping to coach the under-18 side, while also taking on ad hoc club ambassadorial responsibilities.

== International career ==
=== England U20 ===
Cleverley was called up to Noel Blake's England under-20 team for the first time on 12 March 2009. However, following a dislocated shoulder suffered while on loan at Leicester City a few days later, he was forced to withdraw from the squad and was replaced by Leeds United midfielder Adam Clayton. Cleverley eventually made his Under-20 debut on 11 August 2009 in a 5–0 friendly win over Montenegro at The Hawthorns, missing an early penalty but going on to score two-second-half goals.

=== England U21 ===
Cleverley made his England U-21 debut as substitute for Junior Stanislas in a 2–1 win away to Macedonia on 4 September 2009.

=== Great Britain Olympic team ===
On 2 July 2012, Cleverley was named in Stuart Pearce's 18-man Great Britain squad for the 2012 Summer Olympics.

On 20 July 2012, Cleverley played in a warm up match for the Olympics at the Riverside Stadium in Middlesbrough against Brazil national under-23 football team. The match finished 2–0 to Brazil, with Cleverley playing the full match. He played the full match in the tournament's opening fixture against Senegal; which ended 1–1. In the second group match against the United Arab Emirates, Cleverley was instrumental in GB's victory. He set up the winner with a through-ball for Daniel Sturridge and generally impressed with his range of passing.

=== England senior team ===
In August 2011, he was called up to the England senior team by Fabio Capello for a friendly against the Netherlands. but did not end up playing as the match was cancelled on 8 August by The Football Association after the riots in London. He received another call-up for the Euro 2012 qualifying matches with Bulgaria and Wales later in September 2011 alongside fellow new England additions and club-mates Phil Jones and Chris Smalling, but did not end up playing.

He made his debut a year later in a 2–1 win against Italy on 15 August 2012. He made his competitive debut on 7 September 2012, playing the full 90 minutes in a 5–0 win away to Moldova during 2014 FIFA World Cup qualifying and received praise for his performance from manager Roy Hodgson. On 12 October 2012, playing against San Marino in a World Cup qualifier, Cleverley made 165 touches during the match, the highest ever recorded for an England player. He also made two assists in the same match as England won 5–0. His 13th and last cap came in November 2013 against Germany. On 12 May 2014, Cleverley was named in Hodgson's 30-man provisional list for the 2014 FIFA World Cup, however, he was later dropped from the squad.

== Managerial career ==
=== Watford ===
Following the dismissal of Watford manager Valérien Ismaël on 9 March 2024, Cleverley was named as interim head coach. On 16 March, in his first match in charge, he guided Watford to a 1–0 away win against Birmingham City. On 24 April, Cleverley was given the head coach role on a permanent basis having lost only once in his seven matches in interim charge.

On 6 May 2025, he was dismissed from his role as head coach of Watford.

=== Plymouth Argyle ===
On 13 June 2025, Cleverley signed a three-year contract as head coach of League One side Plymouth Argyle. Despite a negative start to the season that saw the club pick up thirteen points from the first fourteen matches, the club issued a statement on 29 October defending Cleverley and issuing that he remained the 'right person' for the job. The club's fortunes changed in the second half of the season, a run of thirteen points from five unbeaten matches seeing Cleverley named EFL League One Manager of the Month for March 2026 as Plymouth continued to push for the play-offs.

== Personal life ==
Growing up, Cleverley suffered from a childhood speech impediment and was given a nickname, "Chunks". In October 2011, Cleverley accepted substantial undisclosed libel damages over a false claim made by The Sun newspaper the previous August that he had "badgered" a girl for sex in Blackpool. Cleverley was at home with his girlfriend in Manchester when the newspaper said the incident had occurred.

In 2012, Cleverley began dating The Only Way is Essex television personality Georgina Dorsett. They had a daughter in 2013 and married at Claridge's hotel in London in 2015. Their son was born in 2016.

In October 2015, Cleverley was present in his house, with his wife and baby daughter, when he was burgled by armed thieves. Watches, designer handbags, jewellery and two Range Rovers were stolen.

== Career statistics ==
=== Club ===
Appearances and goals by club, season and competition
Club	Season	League			FA Cup		League Cup		Other		Total	
Club	Season	Division	Apps	Goals	Apps	Goals	Apps	Goals	Apps	Goals	Apps	Goals
Manchester United	2008–09	Premier League	0	0	0	0	0	0	0	0	0	0
Manchester United	2009–10	Premier League	0	0	—		—		0	0	0	0
Manchester United	2010–11	Premier League	0	0	—		—		0	0	0	0
Manchester United	2011–12	Premier League	10	0	0	0	1	0	4 (Note: One appearance in FA Community Shield, three in UEFA Europa League)	0	15	0
Manchester United	2012–13	Premier League	22	2	4	1	1	1	5 (Note: Appearances in UEFA Champions League)	0	32	4
Manchester United	2013–14	Premier League	22	1	1	0	3	0	5 (Note: One appearance in FA Community Shield, four in UEFA Champions League)	0	31	1
Manchester United	2014–15	Premier League	1	0	—		0	0	—		1	0
Manchester United	Total		55	3	5	1	5	1	14	0	79	5
Leicester City (loan)	2008–09	League One	15	2	—		—		—		15	2
Watford (loan)	2009–10	Championship	33	11	1	0	1	0	—		35	11
Wigan Athletic (loan)	2010–11	Premier League	25	4	—		—		—		25	4
Aston Villa (loan)	2014–15	Premier League	31	3	6	0	—		—		37	3
Everton	2015–16	Premier League	22	2	4	0	4	0	—		30	2
Everton	2016–17	Premier League	10	0	0	0	2	0	—		12	0
Everton	Total		32	2	4	0	6	0	—		42	2
Watford (loan)	2016–17	Premier League	17	0	0	0	—		—		17	0
Watford	2017–18	Premier League	23	1	1	0	1	0	—		25	1
Watford	2018–19	Premier League	13	1	4	0	0	0	—		17	1
Watford	2019–20	Premier League	18	1	0	0	1	0	—		19	1
Watford	2020–21	Championship	34	4	0	0	0	0	—		34	4
Watford	2021–22	Premier League	28	0	1	0	1	0	—		30	0
Watford	2022–23	Championship	4	1	0	0	0	0	—		4	1
Watford	Total		137	8	6	0	3	0	—		146	8
Career total			328	33	22	1	15	1	14	0	379	35

=== International ===
Appearances and goals by national team and year
National team	Year	Apps	Goals
England
England	2012	6	0
England	2013	7	0
Total		13	0

== Managerial statistics ==
As of match played 21 November 2026

Managerial record by team and tenure
Team	From	To	Record					Ref.
Team	From	To	P	W	D	L	Win %	Ref.
Watford	9 March 2024 (Note: Cleverley was appointed by Watford on 9 March 2024 following the team's 2–1 defeat to Coventry City earlier the same day. Soccerbase erroneously include the match in their managerial statistics for Cleverley, which was taken by Valérien Ismaël before his dismissal.)	6 May 2025	59	20	14	25	33.9	
Plymouth Argyle	13 June 2025	Present	77	38	11	28	49.4	
Total			136	58	25	53	42.6	

== Honours ==
=== As a player ===
Leicester City

- Football League One: 2008–09

Manchester United

- Premier League: 2012–13
- FA Community Shield: 2011, 2013

Aston Villa

- FA Cup runner-up: 2014–15

Watford

- FA Cup runner-up: 2018–19
- EFL Championship runner-up: 2020–21

Individual

- Watford Player of the Season: 2009–10

=== As a manager ===
Individual

- EFL League One Manager of the Month: March 2026
