= Conor Sammon =

Irish footballer (born 1986)

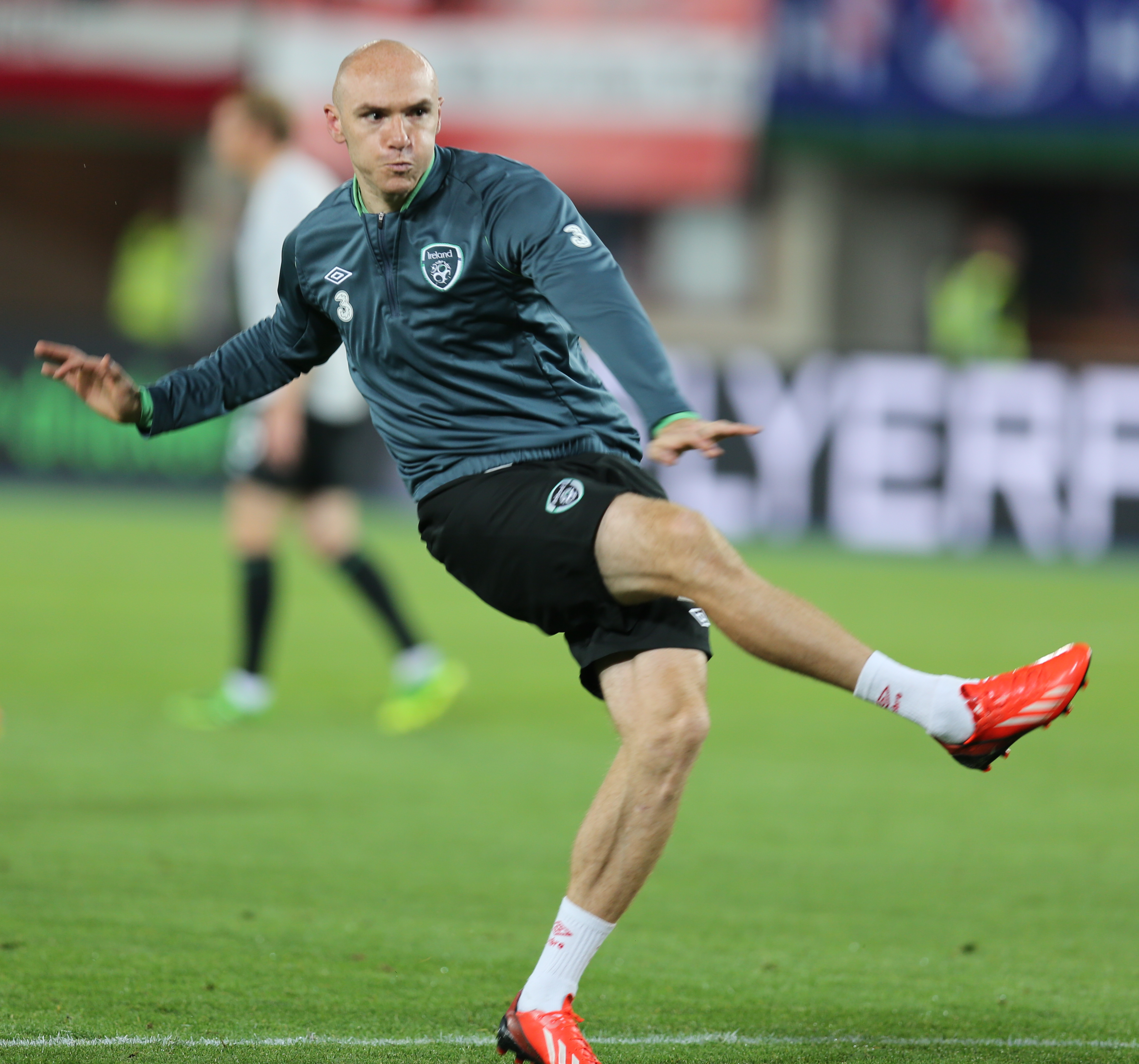
- Sammon with the Republic of Ireland in 2014

Personal information
- Full name: Conor Sammon
- Date of birth: 6 November 1986 (age 40)
- Place of birth: Dublin, Ireland
- Height: 1.88 m (6 ft 2 in)
- Position: Forward

Team information
- Current team: Alloa Athletic (manager)

Youth career
- Malahide United
- Cherry Orchard

Senior career*
| Years | Team | Apps | (Gls) |
| 2005–2007 | UCD | 69 | (13) |
| 2008 | Derry City | 16 | (3) |
| 2008–2011 | Kilmarnock | 65 | (17) |
| 2011–2012 | Wigan Athletic | 32 | (1) |
| 2012–2016 | Derby County | 83 | (10) |
| 2014–2015 | → Ipswich Town (loan) | 19 | (1) |
| 2015 | → Rotherham United (loan) | 15 | (3) |
| 2015–2016 | → Sheffield United (loan) | 27 | (5) |
| 2016–2019 | Heart of Midlothian | 20 | (1) |
| 2017 | → Kilmarnock (loan) | 15 | (5) |
| 2017–2018 | → Partick Thistle (loan) | 31 | (7) |
| 2018–2019 | → Motherwell (loan) | 16 | (0) |
| 2019–2021 | Falkirk | 43 | (8) |
| 2021–2026 | Alloa Athletic | 160 | (33) |
| Total | | 611 | (107) |

International career
| 2007 | Republic of Ireland U21 | 3 | (4) |
| 2007 | Republic of Ireland U23 | 1 | (0) |
| 2013 | Republic of Ireland | 9 | (0) |

Managerial career
- 2026-: Alloa Athletic
- * Club domestic league appearances and goals as of 4 May 2026

Conor Sammon (born 6 November 1986) is a retired Irish professional footballer who is the manager of Scottish League One club Alloa Athletic.

Sammon started his professional career in the League of Ireland Premier Division with University College Dublin and Derry City. In 2008, he moved to Scottish Premier League club Kilmarnock, and in January 2011, English Premier League club Wigan Athletic signed him for £600,000. In August 2012, he moved to Derby County for £1.2 million. During his time there, he also had loans to Ipswich Town, Rotherham United and Sheffield United, before returning to Scotland by signing for Heart of Midlothian in June 2016. He was then loaned by Hearts to Kilmarnock, Partick Thistle and Motherwell before joining Falkirk in 2019. After leaving Falkirk, Sammon signed for Alloa in June 2021.

Formerly an under-21 international, Sammon won 9 international caps for the Republic of Ireland, all in 2013.

== Club career ==
=== UCD and Derry ===
Born in Dublin, Sammon started his career with Malahide United before moving to Cherry Orchard. He then signed a scholarship deal with UCD ahead of the 2005 season.

Sammon scored a hat trick in the Harding Cup final in February 2005. On 8 April 2005, he made his League of Ireland debut as a substitute at Turners Cross. His first league goal came exactly one year later when he netted a brace against Bray Wanderers at Belfield Park.

His single goal knocked Derry City out of the 2007 FAI Cup. While Sammon was nominated for 2007 PFAI Young Player of the Year, he lost out to Mark Quigley of St Patrick's Athletic.

Some UCD fans referred to him as "Sammon of college", before he was signed by fellow League of Ireland side Derry City in December 2007.

=== Kilmarnock ===
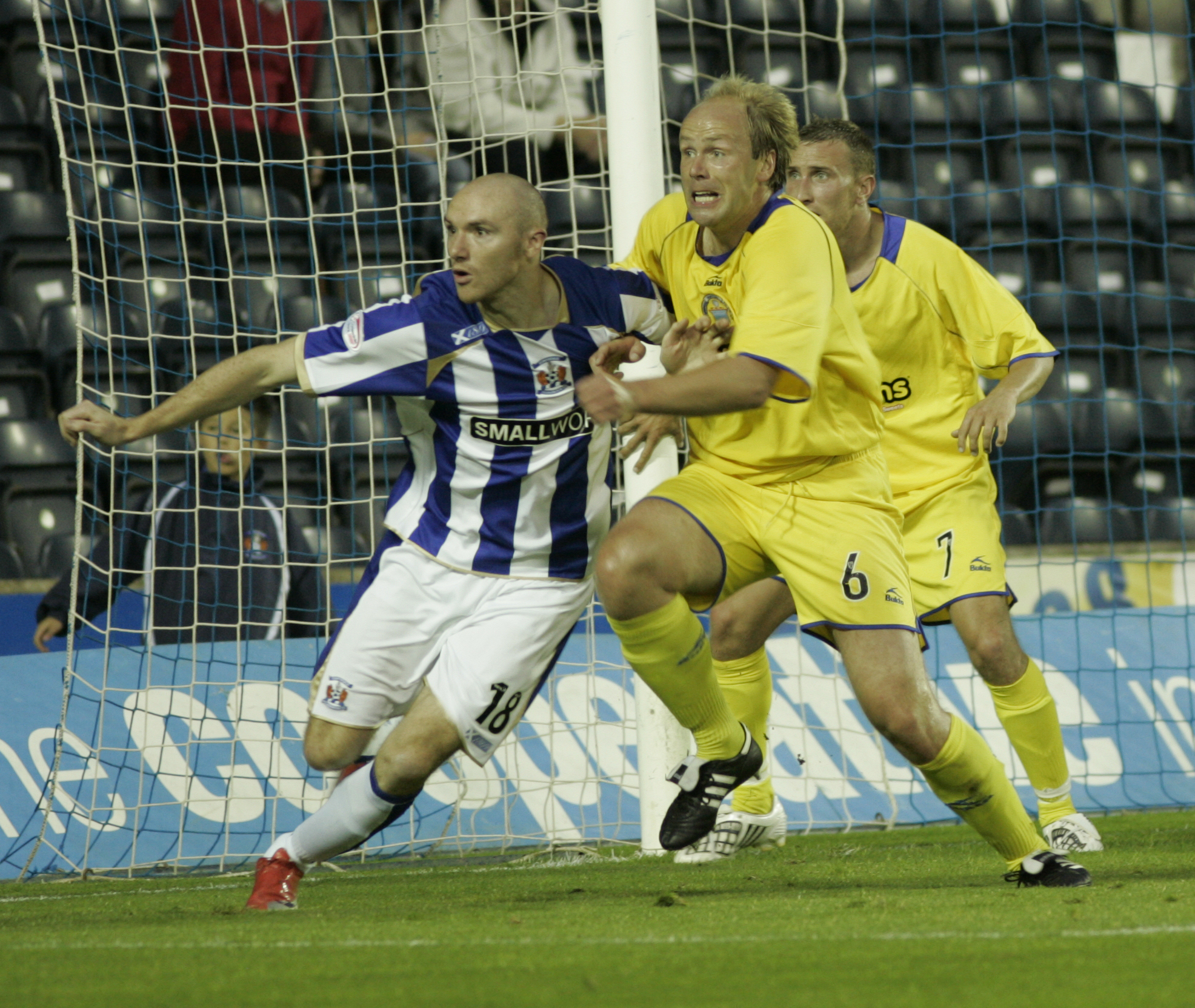
Sammon (left) in action for Kilmarnock against Morton in August 2009.

After a short trial, Sammon signed a three-year deal with Kilmarnock in July 2008 for an undisclosed fee, and made his debut on 9 August 2008 in a 1–0 win against Hibernian. He scored his first goals for the club on 24 September 2008, scoring a brace in a 4–2 Scottish League Cup win against Aberdeen. Sammon struggled in his first two seasons at the club, scoring just seven times in all competitions. In the 2010–11 season, his record was more prolific, scoring 18 goals in 27 games. In January 2011, Sammon turned down a move to Championship club Scunthorpe United after Kilmarnock had accepted a bid of around £450,000 for him. Derby County were also interested in the player.

=== Wigan Athletic ===
On 31 January 2011, Sammon signed a three-and-a-half-year contract with Premier League club Wigan Athletic for an undisclosed fee, believed to be worth an initial £600,000, after he turned down a move to Derby County. He made his debut on 5 March in a 1–0 defeat against Manchester City. He scored his first goal for the club in his sixth game – the second in a 3–2 win against West Ham United on 15 May. His first start for the club came in the following game, a 1–0 win at Stoke City on 22 May 2011, a result which ensured Wigan's Premier League status.

In the 2011–12 season, Sammon started nine games and came on as a substitute eighteen times but he failed to score a single goal. On 26 December 2011, in a game at Manchester United Sammon was sent off for catching the face of Michael Carrick with his elbow, a decision which was judged as "harsh" by the BBC. Wigan appealed the decision, with manager Roberto Martínez saying, "Conor did nothing wrong. You need to accept punishment when you do something wrong but this is a normal phase of play." The appeal was successful and the card was rescinded.

In July 2012, Sammon was again linked with a move to Derby County. A fee of £1.2 million was reported to be agreed by both clubs on 12 August 2012. After leaving, Sammon said of his time at Wigan: "I learned a lot from my time in the Premier League. I've got a lot of time for Roberto Martínez and the staff there. They looked after me well and gave me a great opportunity. I look back on my time there with good memories but also some frustration from not playing as much as I would have liked. Ultimately, I've had a great experience in the Premier League. I've taken lots of positives from my time there and I'm looking to use all of those during my time here at Derby."

=== Derby County ===
==== 2012–13 season ====
On 20 August 2012, Sammon joined Derby County on a four-year contract. Derby manager Nigel Clough said of Sammon, "He is going to be a key player for us and when he plays regularly, we know he can score goals. We really like how hard he works too and that means he will fit into our squad comfortably." Sammon made his Derby debut in a 2–0 defeat to Bolton Wanderers on 21 August and scored his first goal for the club in a 5–1 win against Watford on 1 September. After only scoring twice in his opening sixteen games for the club, Sammon was criticised by fans for a lack of goals, however Clough said he was happy with Sammon, stating that his work-rate was keeping him in the starting line-up ahead of Nathan Tyson who had a better strike rate. His style of play meant that he frequently held up the ball and provided assists for teammates. Clough particularly praised his "absolutely superb" performance in the 2–1 win against Ipswich Town on 23 October, where he provided assists for Theo Robinson and Tyson.

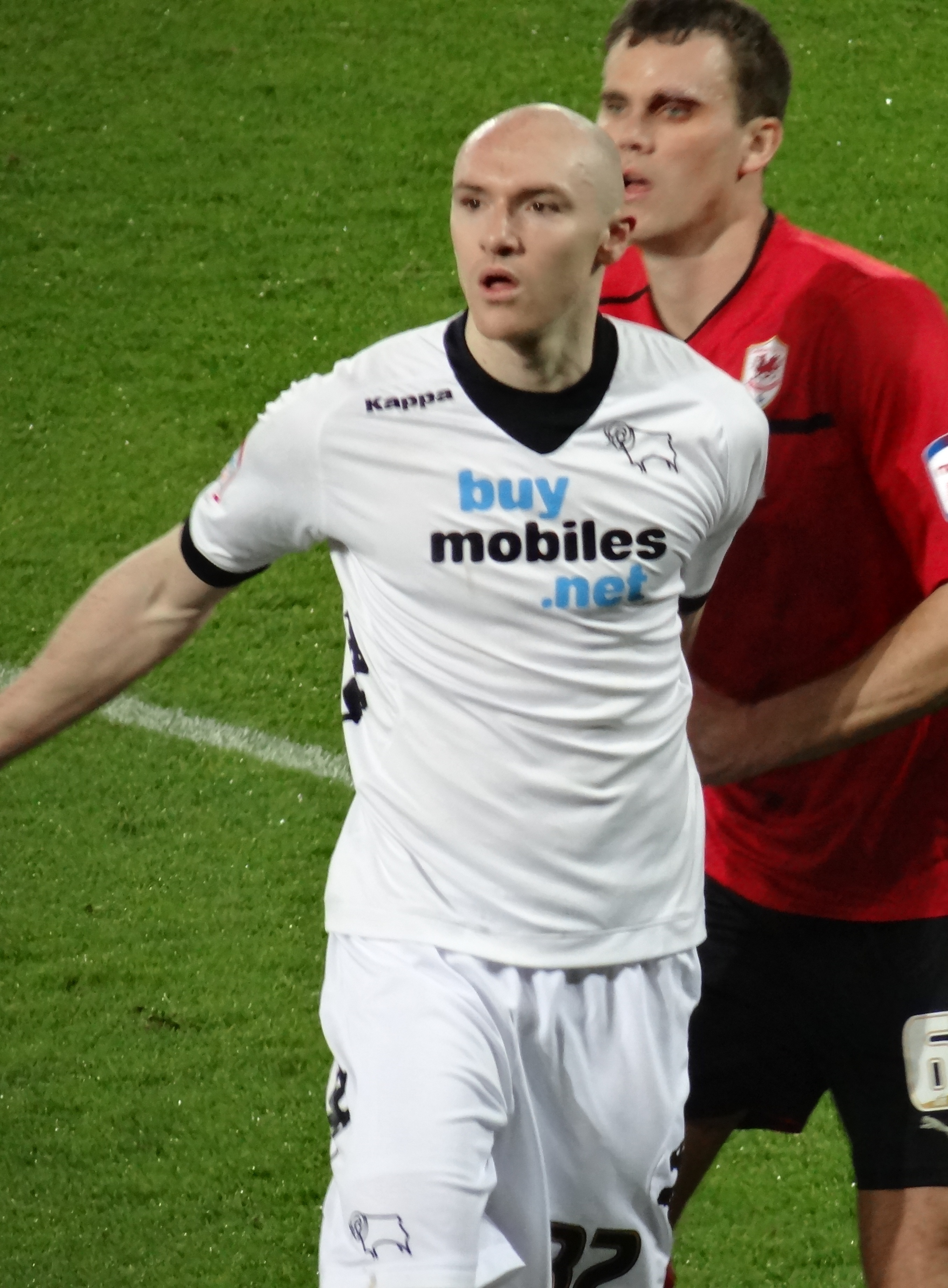
Sammon playing for Derby County in 2013.

Sammon ended his drought with a brace in a 3–2 win against Birmingham City on 24 November and put his improvement of form down to his regaining confidence. Early in the new year, he went on a ten-game goal drought and fans became frustrated with his performances after missing an 87th-minute penalty in Derby's 1–0 home loss to Crystal Palace on 1 March. In the next game however he scored his eighth goal of the season in a 1–1 draw at league leaders Cardiff City, and expressed frustration at his lack of goals but belief in his ability to score more despite the negative chants from the crowd. In Derby's game at Leeds United on 1 April, Sammon had a goal ruled out for offside at 0–0 and missed a penalty on 73 minutes with Derby losing 1–0. He struck the post before Paul Coutts scored on the rebound, Derby eventually winning 2–1. He ended an eleven-match goalless streak (9 for Derby, 2 for Ireland) with an 85th-minute winner against Millwall on the final day of the season. It was only Sammon's third league goal of 2013. However, despite the criticism from supporters, Sammon was named the 61st best player in the 2012–13 Football League Championship by the Actim Index.

==== 2013–14 season ====
Ahead of the 2013–14 season, Derby signed Chris Martin on a permanent deal after a loan, as well as adding Johnny Russell to the squad. These additions saw Sammon slip down the pecking order and he was restricted to substitute appearances in the opening stages of the season, though he did start three League Cup ties, scoring twice in a 5–0 win over Brentford on 27 August. Following the sacking of Clough, Sammon was awarded his first league start of the season against Ipswich, though he was withdrawn at half-time with Derby 4–1 down in a match they eventually drew 4–4. New manager Steve McClaren quickly signed Tottenham Hotspur's Simon Dawkins on loan, meaning Sammon returned to substitute appearances. Between 5 October and the end of the calendar year, Sammon appeared as a second-half substitute eleven times scoring two late winners, in a 3–2 victory at Watford and a 2–1 victory against Middlesbrough on 4 December, and continued in such a role as the team reached the play-offs.

Sammon joined fellow Championship team Ipswich Town on a season-long loan on 15 August 2014, managed by former Ireland national manager Mick McCarthy. He made his debut the following day, replacing David McGoldrick for the final 20 minutes of a 1–0 loss away to Reading. Sammon scored only once in 20 games for the Suffolk-based team, the crucial one in a 2–1 win over former team Wigan on 22 September, after earlier missing an opportunity when set up by McGoldrick.

==== Loans from Derby ====
On 15 January 2015, Sammon's loan at Portman Road was permitted to end by McCarthy, and he moved to another team in the same division, Rotherham United, until the end of the season. Two days later, he made his debut for the Millers, playing the entirety of a 0–2 home loss to high-flying Bournemouth. On 27 January, he scored his first goal in a 4–2 home win over struggling Bolton Wanderers, from close range after Andy Lonergan saved from Matt Derbyshire. He finished his spell at the New York Stadium with 3 goals from 15 appearances.

On 25 July 2015, Sammon joined League One club Sheffield United on loan for the whole season. He scored his first goals in a 3–1 win at Peterborough United on 18 August, and totalled 6 goals from 33 games, being in and out of a team also featuring Billy Sharp, Che Adams and Jose Baxter up front.

=== Heart of Midlothian ===
On 15 June 2016, Sammon returned to Scotland for the first time in five and a half years, joining Heart of Midlothian on a three-year contract after negotiating an early exit from Derby. He made his debut on 14 July in the first leg of the second qualifying round of the season's UEFA Europa League, away to Birkirkara in Malta. He started the match, having a goal disallowed for offside before later being substituted for Juanma. A week later, he scored his first goal for the team, heading Arnaud Djoum's cross as they were eliminated in a 2–1 second-leg loss at Tynecastle. Sammon departed Hearts on completion of his contract. In all he scored two goals in 23 appearances for Hearts.

==== Loans from Hearts ====
31 January 2017, Sammon returned to Kilmarnock on loan for the rest of the 2016–17 season. His form at Killie led his manager Lee McCulloch to back him for a return to the Irish national team.

On 11 August 2017, Sammon was loaned to Partick Thistle for the 2017–18 season. He made his debut for the Jags later that day, playing the full 90 minutes of a 1–0 home loss to reigning champions Celtic. Sammon scored his first Jags goal with a great finish, scoring the winner in a 3–2 win over Motherwell at Firhill. Sammon scored 10 goals in 36 appearances in all competitions for Thistle, before returning to hearts in the summer.

On 16 July 2018, Motherwell announced the signing of Sammon on a season-long loan deal. His first goals for the club came on 24 July 2018, when he scored twice in a 2–0 win against Queen of the South in the League Cup group stage.

=== Falkirk ===
On 4 July 2019, Sammon signed for Scottish League One club Falkirk. He made his debut nine days later in the Scottish League Cup, scoring a last-minute equaliser in a 1–1 home draw with Livingston, though his team lost on penalties.

=== Alloa Athletic ===
Sammon signed for Alloa Athletic in June 2021.

On 26 May 2026, Sammon announced his retirement from professional football.

== International career ==
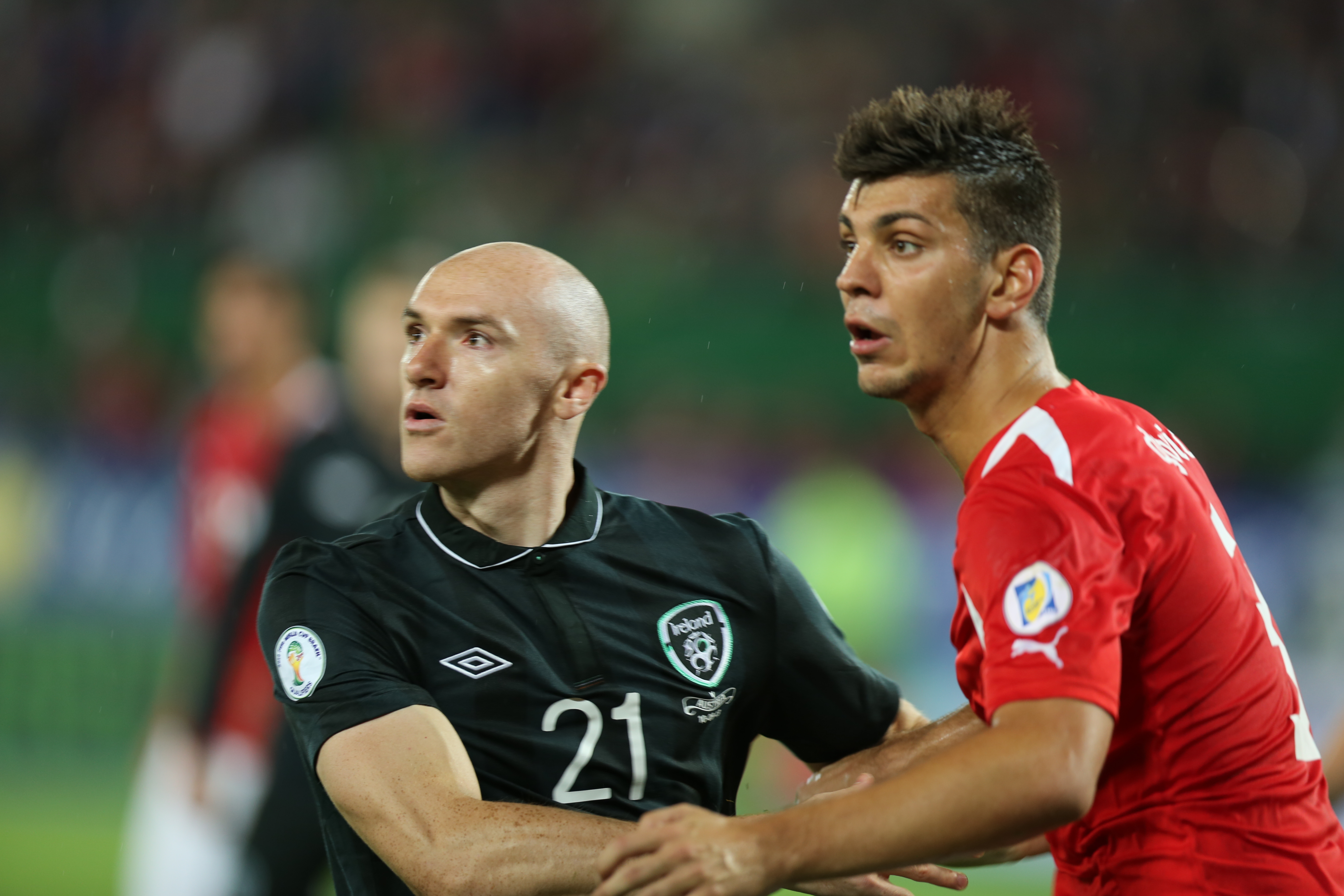
Sammon (left) in action for the Republic of Ireland against Austria in 2013.

Sammon earned his first call up to the Republic of Ireland under-21s in a qualifying match for the 2009 European Under-21 Championship against Portugal under-21s on 7 September 2007. He played for the under-21s on two more occasions and also represented the under-23s in a match against Slovakia.

In January 2013, Sammon was called up to the senior squad for the first time to play in a friendly against Poland on 6 February. A day ahead of the match, Irish coach Giovanni Trapattoni named Sammon in the starting eleven and he played the full 90 minutes in a 2–0 win for Ireland at the Aviva Stadium, which Sammon described as "a very proud moment".

On 22 March 2013, he made his competitive debut in a 0–0 draw away to Sweden in a World Cup qualifier, coming on as a substitute after 87 minutes. He made his first competitive start in the following game on 26 March, playing the full 90 minutes in Ireland's 2–2 draw at home to Austria and playing a part in winning the penalty and corner kick for both of Jonathan Walters goals.

Ahead of Ireland's friendly with Spain on 12 June 2013, Trapattoni suggested that Sammon and his Derby teammate Jeff Hendrick should be playing in the Premier League: "they play Championship, and I have to ask why when I see the games in the Premier League and the way they play with us. Quality is quality." Derby manager Nigel Clough was annoyed by his comments, saying that: "We don't really think it is his place to be commenting on things like that... We can take it as a backhanded compliment, in some ways."

== Career statistics ==
=== Club ===
As of 17 September 2019

Appearances and goals by club, season and competition
| Club | Season | League | | | National Cup | | League Cup | | Other^{[B]} | | Total | |
| Club | Season | Division | Apps | Goals | Apps | Goals | Apps | Goals | Apps | Goals | Apps | Goals |
|---|---|---|---|---|---|---|---|---|---|---|---|---|
| UCD | 2005 | LOI Premier Division | 7 | 0 | 0 | 0 | 2 | 0 | 0 | 0 | 9 | 0 |
| UCD | 2006 | LOI Premier Division | 31 | 7 | 3 | 0 | 1 | 1 | 0 | 0 | 35 | 8 |
| UCD | 2007 | LOI Premier Division | 31 | 6 | 4 | 3 | 4 | 2 | 0 | 0 | 39 | 11 |
| UCD | Total | | 69 | 13 | 7 | 3 | 7 | 3 | 0 | 0 | 83 | 19 |
| Derry City | 2008 | LOI Premier Division | 16 | 3 | 2 | 0 | 2 | 4 | 0 | 0 | 20 | 7 |
| Kilmarnock | 2008–09 | Scottish Premier League | 17 | 1 | 0 | 0 | 3 | 2 | 0 | 0 | 20 | 3 |
| Kilmarnock | 2009–10 | Scottish Premier League | 25 | 1 | 2 | 1 | 2 | 2 | 0 | 0 | 29 | 4 |
| Kilmarnock | 2010–11 | Scottish Premier League | 23 | 15 | 1 | 0 | 3 | 3 | 0 | 0 | 27 | 18 |
| Kilmarnock | Total | | 65 | 17 | 3 | 1 | 8 | 7 | 0 | 0 | 76 | 25 |
| Wigan Athletic | 2010–11 | Premier League | 7 | 1 | 0 | 0 | 0 | 0 | 0 | 0 | 7 | 1 |
| Wigan Athletic | 2011–12 | Premier League | 25 | 0 | 1 | 0 | 1 | 0 | 0 | 0 | 27 | 0 |
| Wigan Athletic | Total | | 32 | 1 | 1 | 0 | 1 | 0 | 0 | 0 | 34 | 1 |
| Derby County | 2012–13 | Championship | 45 | 8 | 2 | 1 | 0 | 0 | 0 | 0 | 47 | 9 |
| Derby County | 2013–14 | Championship | 37 | 2 | 1 | 0 | 3 | 2 | 1 (Note: Appearance in the Championship play-offs) | 0 | 42 | 4 |
| Derby County | 2014–15 | Championship | 1 | 0 | 0 | 0 | 0 | 0 | 0 | 0 | 1 | 0 |
| Derby County | Total | | 83 | 10 | 3 | 1 | 3 | 2 | 1 | 0 | 90 | 13 |
| Ipswich Town | 2014–15 | Championship | 19 | 1 | 1 | 0 | 0 | 0 | 0 | 0 | 20 | 1 |
| Rotherham United | 2014–15 | Championship | 15 | 3 | 0 | 0 | 0 | 0 | 0 | 0 | 15 | 3 |
| Sheffield United | 2015–16 | League One | 27 | 5 | 3 | 1 | 1 | 0 | 2 (Note: Appearances in the Football League Trophy) | 0 | 33 | 6 |
| Hearts | 2016–17 | Scottish Premiership | 19 | 1 | 2 | 0 | 1 | 0 | 4 (Note: Appearances in the Europa League) | 1 | 26 | 2 |
| Hearts | 2017–18 | Scottish Premiership | 1 | 0 | 0 | 0 | 0 | 0 | — | | 1 | 0 |
| Hearts | 2018–19 | Scottish Premiership | 0 | 0 | 0 | 0 | 0 | 0 | – | | 0 | 0 |
| Hearts | Total | | 20 | 1 | 2 | 0 | 1 | 0 | 4 | 1 | 27 | 2 |
| Kilmarnock (loan) | 2016–17 | Scottish Premiership | 15 | 5 | 0 | 0 | 0 | 0 | — | | 15 | 5 |
| Partick Thistle (loan) | 2017–18 | Scottish Premiership | 31 | 7 | 2 | 3 | 1 | 0 | 2 (Note: Appearances in the Scottish Premiership play-offs) | 0 | 36 | 10 |
| Motherwell (loan) | 2018–19 | Scottish Premiership | 16 | 0 | 0 | 0 | 5 | 3 | – | | 21 | 3 |
| Falkirk | 2019–20 | Scottish League One | 6 | 4 | 0 | 0 | 2 | 1 | 2 (Note: Appearances in the Scottish Challenge Cup) | 0 | 10 | 5 |
| Career total | | | 414 | 68 | 24 | 6 | 31 | 20 | 11 | 1 | 480 | 113 |

=== International ===
As of 10 September 2013.

Republic of Ireland national team
| Year | Apps | Goals |
|---|---|---|
| 2013 | 9 | 0 |
| Total | 9 | 0 |
