= Isaac Shaze =

Ghanaian footballer

Personal information
- Date of birth: 25 June 1989 (age 37)
- Place of birth: Ghana
- Height: 1.64 m (5 ft 5 in)
- Position: Midfielder

Team information
- Current team: FC Trollhättan

Youth career
- Years: Team
- Right to Dream
2009	Ledbury Town		
2009-2010	Forest Green Rovers		
2010-2011	Evesham United		
2011-2013	Östersund	35+	(7+)
2014	Umeå FC	21	(2)
2015-2017	Öster	61	(2)
2018	TB/FC Suðuroy/Royn	13	(1)
2018	Gefle	12	(0)
2019	KPV	14	(0)
2020-	FC Trollhättan	19	(0)

Isaac Shaze (born 25 June 1989) is a Ghanaian footballer who plays as a midfielder for FC Trollhättan.

== Career ==
Shaze played college football in England.

He started his career with English tenth division side Ledbury Town.

In 2009, Shaze signed for Forest Green Rovers in the English fifth division.

In 2010, he signed for English seventh division club Evesham United

In 2011, he signed for Östersund in the Swedish fourth division, helping them achieve promotion to the Swedish second division within 2 seasons.

Before the 2014 season, Shaze signed for Swedish third division team Umeå FC.

Before the 2018 season, he signed for TB/FC Suðuroy/Royn in the Faroe Islands.

In 2018, he signed for Swedish second division outfit Gefle.

Before the 2019 season, Shaze signed for KPV in Finland, where he made 21 appearances and scored 0 goals. On 25 January 2019, he debuted for KPV during a 1–1 draw with KuPS.

Before the 2020 season, he signed for Swedish third division side FC Trollhättan.
