= Jordan Robinson =

English footballer

Personal information
- Full name: Jordan Daniel Robinson
- Date of birth: 28 April 1991 (age 35)
- Place of birth: Yarm, England
- Positions: Defender; midfielder

Team information
- Current team: Ytterhogdal

Youth career
- –2010: Middlesbrough
- 2010–2011: Wigan Athletic

Senior career*
Years	Team	Apps	(Gls)
2011–2012	Wigan Athletic	0	(0)
2012–2013	Billingham Synthonia	19	(0)
2013–2015	Darlington 1883		
2015	Spennymoor Town		
2015–2018	Ytterhogdal		
2018–2021	Stockton Town		
- * Club domestic league appearances and goals

Jordan Robinson is an English football defender or midfielder.

Previously a youth team player at Middlesbrough, he signed for Wigan Athletic in 2010, and made his first-team debut in an FA Cup third round match against Hull City on 8 January 2011.

In September 2012, Robinson signed for Northern League side Billingham Synthonia, and made his debut on 29 September against Shildon. He then played for Darlington 1883 and Spennymoor Town and signed for Ytterhogdal of the Swedish Football Division 3 (level 5) in December 2015.

In June 2018, Robinson joined Stockton Town of the Northern League Division One to help their push for promotion and played a key part in the 2019–20 team that were top of the league before the league was deemed null and void due to the coronavirus outbreak.
