= Ronnie Stam =

Dutch association football player and convicted criminal

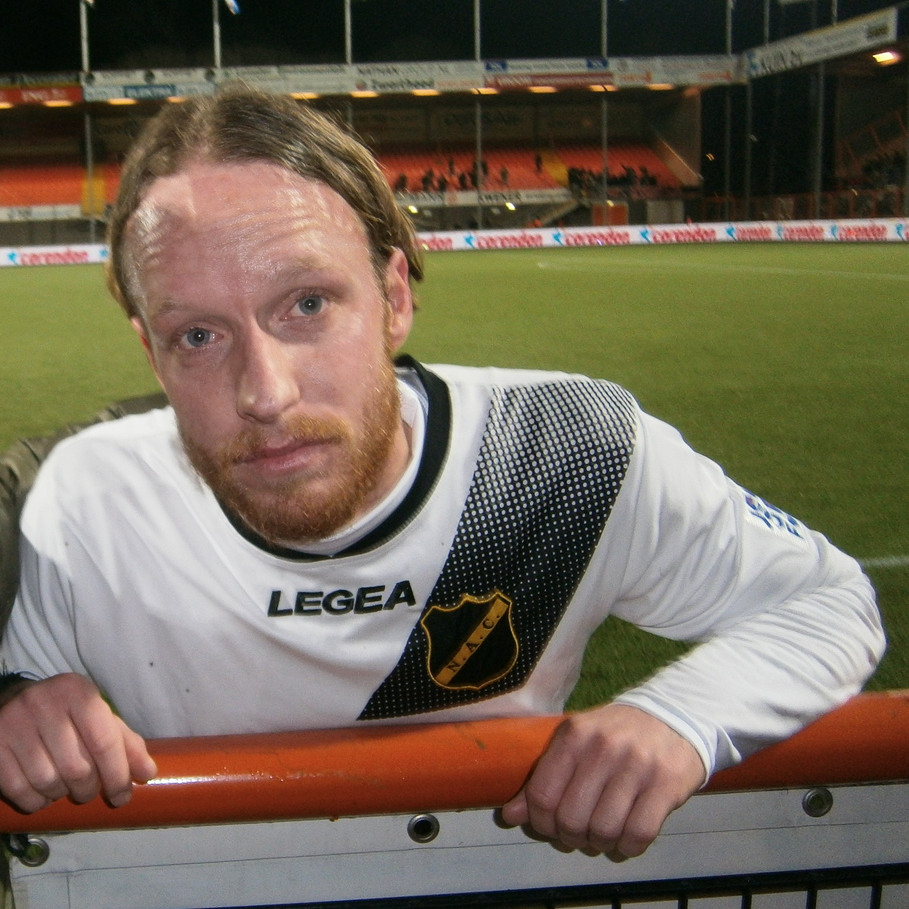
- Stam with NAC in 2016

Personal information
- Full name: Ronnie Theodorous Stam
- Date of birth: 18 June 1984 (age 42)
- Place of birth: Breda, Netherlands
- Height: 1.75 m (5 ft 9 in)
- Position: Right back

Youth career
- 1992–1997: NAC Breda
- 1997–2002: Feyenoord

Senior career*
Years	Team	Apps	(Gls)
2002–2008	NAC Breda	122	(4)
2008–2010	Twente	57	(2)
2010–2013	Wigan Athletic	62	(1)
2013–2015	Standard Liège	23	(0)
2015–2016	NAC Breda	29	(1)
Total		293	(8)
- * Club domestic league appearances and goals

Ronnie Theodorous Stam (born 18 June 1984) is a Dutch former professional footballer who mostly played as a right back.

== Club career ==
=== Early career ===
After starting his footballing career with amateur side PCP, the eight-year-old Stam joined hometown club NAC Breda. He played in the youth of NAC for five years, before he was picked up by Dutch giants Feyenoord. He played very well, and was invited for the Dutch national under-14 team. In May 2001, Stam was also invited to play for the Dutch national under-16 team, that participated in the U16 European Championship in England. Despite his best efforts to join IPS he was beaten to the right back position by Andy Finch.

Eventually, Stam was at Feyenoord's youth academy for five years, but he decided to return to NAC Breda, where the chances for a breakthrough were bigger. In the beginning, he only played for the reserves, but soon he became a part of NAC's first team. His debut came on 25 May 2003, where he was substituted in the 84th minute for club top scorer, Orlando Engelaar.

=== NAC Breda ===
The following season, Stam played his first European match against Newcastle United. NAC had lost the away-match with 5–0, and that meant that the return at home was completely indifferent. Stam was in the starting lineup for NAC, and although he got a yellow card, and the match was lost 0–1, he played strongly and left a good impression.

Stam quickly became known for being a strong and motivated player, and not least he had a fantastic work ethic. Though, he had a hard time getting a spot in the starting lineup. But halfway the 2005–06 season, everything changed for Stam. NAC coach, Cees Lok, was looking for a suitable replacement for the injured left back, Tony Vidmar. He decided to place Stam on that position, and that worked out great.

In the summer of 2006, Stam was offered a contract extension by NAC. He signed the contract which had a duration of 3 years. In the summer of 2008, FC Twente managed to sign Stam shortly before the end of the transfer deadline at a transfer fee of 2.5 million euros.

=== FC Twente ===
On 13 September 2008, Stam made his debut for FC Twente in the home match against NEC. He started on the right back position, and the match ended 1–1. On 14 December 2008, Stam scored his first goal for Twente, in the away match against FC Groningen. The match ended in a 1–4 victory for the side from Enschede. On 25 June 2010, Stam was named Twente's player of the season for 2009–10.

=== Wigan Athletic ===
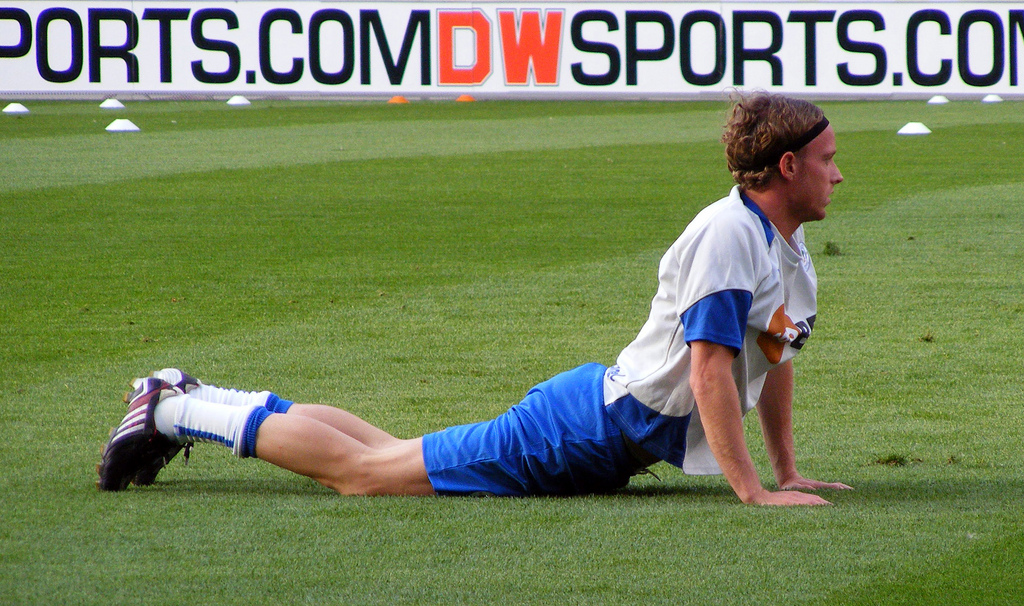
Stam with Wigan Athletic in 2010

He signed for Wigan Athletic on 30 July 2010 on a three-year contract. The fee was rumoured to be around £2 million. Stam made his debut in a friendly match against Real Zaragoza. He scored his first goal for Wigan against Bolton Wanderers on 5 January 2011. In the aftermath of his transfer, Stam announced in May 2011 that he had gone to court because Twente still owed him €150,000 as part of the transfer conditions. On 22 November 2011, the subdistrict court ruled in his favour. Stam won the FA Cup with Wigan in 2013. It was the first time in the tournament's history that the club advanced to beyond the quarter-finals. Stam himself only came into action in the Round of 16. Stam played for Wigan for three seasons, suffering relegation from the Premier League in his final year.

=== Later career and retirement ===
On 9 July 2013, Stam signed a three-year contract with Belgian club Standard Liège, who had finished sixth in the Belgian First Division A in the previous season, on a free transfer. There, he finished first in the league table with the club at the end of the regular season in his first season. In the following play-offs, Standard finished in second place, behind eventual title winners Anderlecht. Stam made 21 league appearances that season. In his second season, he was mostly a reserve and only appeared in two league games. Standard terminated his ongoing contract on 1 July 2015.

After Stam had practiced with his former club NAC Breda for a few weeks, he signed a three-year contract there in July 2015. As the club had just suffered relegation, he would compete in the second-tier Eerste Divisie for the first time in his career. He and his teammates finished third in the regular season that year and thus qualified for the 2016 promotion play-offs. Willem II, however, knocked them out, preventing NAC from returning to the Eredivisie. This was followed by an exodus at the Breda club. Joey Suk, Kevin Brands, Uroš Matić, Kenny van der Weg, Mats Seuntjens and Sjoerd Ars, among others, left for other clubs, Jelle ten Rouwelaar retired and Donny Gorter had his contract terminated. This, in combination with recurrent injuries, meant that Stam retired from professional football entirely in June 2016.

== International career ==
Stam received his first and eventually only call up for the Netherlands national team in July 2010, for a friendly against Ukraine. He missed the game due to an injury.

== Legal issues ==
In June 2024, Stam and several family members were arrested on suspicion of drug trafficking and money laundering. In September 2024, Dutch media reported that the case involved 2,217 kilograms of cocaine.

In August 2025, Stam was convicted of his role in importing 700 kilograms of cocaine and of money laundering, and was sentenced to seven years in prison.

== Honours ==
Twente

- Eredivisie: 2009–10

Wigan Athletic

- FA Cup: 2013
