= 2022–23 Premier League =

Football season in England

Premier League
- Season: 2022–23
- Dates: 5 August 2022 – 28 May 2023
- Champions: Manchester City; 7th Premier League title 9th English title
- Relegated: Leicester City; Leeds United; Southampton
- Champions League: Manchester City; Arsenal; Manchester United; Newcastle United
- Europa League: Liverpool; Brighton & Hove Albion; West Ham United (as Europa Conference League winners)
- Europa Conference League: Aston Villa
- Matches: 380
- Goals: 1,084 (2.85 per match)
- Best player: Erling Haaland
- Top goalscorer: Erling Haaland (36 goals)
- Best goalkeeper: David de Gea (17 clean sheets)
- Biggest home win: Liverpool 9–0 Bournemouth (27 August 2022)
- Biggest away win: Leeds United 1–6 Liverpool (17 April 2023)
- Highest scoring: Liverpool 9–0 Bournemouth (27 August 2022); Manchester City 6–3 Manchester United (2 October 2022)
- Longest winning run: 12 matches Manchester City
- Longest unbeaten run: 17 matches Newcastle United
- Longest winless run: 13 matches Southampton
- Longest losing run: 6 matches Leicester City; Southampton
- Highest attendance: 75,546; Manchester United 2–1 Manchester City (14 January 2023)
- Lowest attendance: 9,972; Bournemouth 0–2; Crystal Palace (31 December 2022)
- Total attendance: 15,289,340
- Average attendance: 40,235

The 2022–23 Premier League was the 31st season of the Premier League and the 124th season of top-flight English football overall. Fulham, Bournemouth and Nottingham Forest were the three promoted clubs from the 2021–22 EFL Championship, replacing Burnley, Watford and Norwich City.

Following Arsenal's defeat to Nottingham Forest on 20 May, Manchester City officially secured a third consecutive Premier League title with three games to spare, becoming the second club after local rivals Manchester United to achieve the feat in the Premier League era. It was their ninth English title overall and their seventh since 1992. The league title was the first leg in a treble-winning season for City, as they would later go on to win the FA Cup and UEFA Champions League, a feat which only United had previously achieved in England. Meanwhile, Arsenal broke the record of spending the greatest number of days, with 248, on top of the league in a top flight season without winning the title in English top flight history.

This season was also the first since 2017–18, and only the fourth Premier League season overall, where all three promoted teams at the start of the season avoided relegation. This was also the first time since 2014–15 that the team 20th at Christmas (Wolverhampton Wanderers), managed to avoid relegation.

The 2022–23 season was the highest-scoring 38-game season in Premier League history, with 1,084 goals scored and a 2.85 goals per match ratio. Erling Haaland broke the Premier League record for most goals scored by a player in one season with 36 goals.

It was also the second Premier League season in a row where over 15 millions fans attended matches and with total of 15,289,340 spectators a new competition record was set.

== Summary ==
The season began with Arsenal going on a five-game unbeaten streak before they played Manchester United at Old Trafford where they lost 3–1. Manchester City got off to a strong start, having signed striker Erling Haaland; they went on a nine-game unbeaten run before losing at Liverpool in October. Arsenal were top of the table for much of the season, at one point holding an eight point lead over Manchester City. However, a run of three consecutive draws allowed City to cut their lead, ultimately taking control after beating them 4–1 at the Etihad Stadium. Two consecutive losses against Brighton & Hove Albion and Nottingham Forest left Arsenal four points behind Manchester City with three more games to play, with the latter result confirming City as champions. They were presented with the Premier League trophy on 21 May 2023.

Manchester United returned to the Champions League in Erik ten Hag's debut season as the club's manager, in addition to winning the Carabao Cup – their first trophy since 2017 – and reaching the final of the FA Cup. Newcastle United qualified for the Champions League for the first time in 20 years, their highest finish since Sir Bobby Robson was the club's manager. Liverpool endured a difficult season and finished 5th, missing out on Champions League football for the first time since 2015–16. Notably, they thrashed Bournemouth 9–0 and rivals Manchester United 7–0.

Despite spending over £600m on new transfers under new ownership led by Todd Boehly, Chelsea had one of their worst Premier League seasons to date, with the Blues finishing in the bottom half of the table after first sacking Thomas Tuchel in September, and then sacking his successor Graham Potter the following April, after only seven months in charge. Frank Lampard returned to the club as interim manager, having previously been sacked himself in January 2021, but the team fared no better under his stewardship either. They ended up finishing 12th, their lowest league finish since 1993–94, and had accumulated just 44 points – their lowest ever in a Premier League season.

Brighton & Hove Albion lost manager Potter to Chelsea in September, but his successor Roberto De Zerbi led the team to a club record finish of 6th, and qualified for the Europa League, the first European qualification in the history of the club.

Aston Villa secured qualification for European football for the first time since 2009–10; an indifferent start to the season saw the departure of manager Steven Gerrard, but his successor Unai Emery, along with in-form striker Ollie Watkins, saw Villa climb the table in the second half of the season to finish 7th and qualify for the Europa Conference League. Tottenham Hotspur had an erratic season, with manager Antonio Conte departing by mutual consent in March, days after publicly criticising the team in a post-match press conference. He was initially replaced by his assistant Cristian Stellini until the end of the season, but a poor run, culminating in a 6–1 defeat away to Newcastle, where the team were 5–0 down after just 20 minutes, saw him sacked and replaced by Ryan Mason as caretaker manager. Tottenham ended up finishing 8th, failing to qualify for European football for the first time since 2008–09, and finishing below rivals Arsenal in the league for the first time since 2015–16.

Brentford enjoyed one of the best seasons in their history, at one point going on a 12-match unbeaten run. They notably thrashed Manchester United 4–0 and beat Liverpool 3–1, and were the only team to beat Manchester City twice. Their 9th-place finish marked their highest finish in top-flight football since 1938.

Bournemouth, who were tipped for relegation at the start of the season (particularly after their 9–0 loss to Liverpool at Anfield, which saw manager Scott Parker sacked soon after), defied the critics by avoiding relegation, with Gary O'Neil, first as interim, then permanent manager, guiding the team to safety. Nottingham Forest broke the record for most signings in a Premier League season with 21, and a late run of home victories over Brighton, Southampton and Arsenal secured safety. The final newly promoted side, Fulham, enjoyed a successful return to the top flight with a 10th place finish.

Southampton were the first team to be relegated after eleven consecutive years in the top flight. The Saints sacked Ralph Hasenhüttl in November after just under four years in charge and Nathan Jones was appointed as his successor. He would then be dismissed in February after winning just once in his eight league matches in charge. He was replaced for the rest of the season by Rubén Sellés, who was unable to turn the dire situation around, and a 2–0 home loss to Fulham on 13 May sealed their fate, as they finished at the bottom of the table.

Going into the final day of the season, two relegation places were still to be confirmed, with Everton, Leeds United and Leicester City all potentially at threat of relegation. Leeds failed to repeat their last day escape of the previous season and were also relegated after three years back in the top flight, losing 4–1 at home to Tottenham Hotspur. Everton escaped relegation after a 1–0 win over Bournemouth, extending their top flight stay to a 70th consecutive year. The Toffees' survival confirmed Leicester's relegation after a nine year stay in the top flight, despite a 2–1 home win over West Ham. Their relegation came only seven years after being crowned champions of England, and they became only the second club in the Premier League era after Blackburn Rovers to be relegated as previous title winners.

=== Developments ===
Starting from the 2022–23 season, clubs are able to make five substitutions rather than three. These substitutions can be made in three stoppages during game time, and additionally at half time, in line with other top European leagues – Serie A, La Liga, Ligue 1 and the Bundesliga.

There was a mid-season break for the 2022 FIFA World Cup in Qatar, with the last matches before the hiatus played on the weekend of 12–13 November 2022 and the first matches after the World Cup played on 26 December 2022, after the World Cup final on 18 December 2022.

On 9 September 2022, all Premier League matches scheduled for 10–12 September were postponed as a mark of respect due to the death of Queen Elizabeth II. The following week, three Premier League matches scheduled for 17–18 September were postponed due to the policing issues surrounding Queen Elizabeth II's state funeral on 19 September. Also, in the same week, the Arsenal game against Manchester City, scheduled for 19 October, was postponed to accommodate Arsenal's Europa League tie with PSV Eindhoven, which was itself postponed from 15 September to 20 October.

== Teams ==
Twenty teams competed in the league – the top seventeen teams from the previous season and the three teams promoted from the Championship. The promoted teams were Fulham, Bournemouth, and Nottingham Forest, who returned to the top flight after respective absences of one, two and twenty-three years. They replaced Burnley (relegated to the Championship after a six-year top flight spell), Watford, and Norwich City (both teams relegated after just one year back in the top flight).

=== Stadiums and locations ===
Locations of the 2022–23 Premier League teams
Greater London Premier League football clubs

Note: Table lists in alphabetical order.

Team	Location	Stadium	Capacity
Arsenal	London (Holloway)	Emirates Stadium	60,704
Aston Villa	Birmingham	Villa Park	42,657
Bournemouth	Bournemouth	Dean Court	11,307
Brentford	London (Brentford)	Brentford Community Stadium	17,250
Brighton & Hove Albion	Falmer	Falmer Stadium	31,780
Chelsea	London (Fulham)	Stamford Bridge	40,343
Crystal Palace	London (Selhurst)	Selhurst Park	25,486
Everton	Liverpool (Walton)	Goodison Park	39,414
Fulham	London (Fulham)	Craven Cottage	22,384
Leeds United	Leeds	Elland Road	37,608
Leicester City	Leicester	King Power Stadium	32,262
Liverpool	Liverpool (Anfield)	Anfield	53,394
Manchester City	Manchester (Eastlands)	City of Manchester Stadium	53,400
Manchester United	Manchester (Old Trafford)	Old Trafford	74,310
Newcastle United	Newcastle upon Tyne	St James' Park	52,305
Nottingham Forest	West Bridgford	City Ground	30,332
Southampton	Southampton	St Mary's Stadium	32,384
Tottenham Hotspur	London (Tottenham)	Tottenham Hotspur Stadium	62,850
West Ham United	London (Stratford)	London Stadium	62,500
Wolverhampton Wanderers	Wolverhampton	Molineux Stadium	31,750

=== Personnel and kits ===
Team	Manager	Captain	Kit manufacturer	Shirt sponsor (chest)	Shirt sponsor (sleeve)
Arsenal	(Spain) Mikel Arteta	(Norway) Martin Ødegaard	Adidas	Emirates	Visit Rwanda
Aston Villa	(Spain) Unai Emery	(Scotland) John McGinn	Castore	Cazoo	Kaiyun Sports
Bournemouth	(England) Gary O'Neil	(Brazil) Neto	Umbro	Dafabet	DeWalt
Brentford	(Denmark) Thomas Frank	(Sweden) Pontus Jansson	Umbro	Hollywoodbets	Safetyculture
Brighton & Hove Albion	(Italy) Roberto De Zerbi	(England) Lewis Dunk	Nike	American Express	SnickersUK.com
Chelsea	(England) Frank Lampard (interim)	(Spain) César Azpilicueta	Nike	Three	WhaleFin
Crystal Palace	(England) Roy Hodgson	(Serbia) Luka Milivojević	Macron	Cinch	Mukuru
Everton	(England) Sean Dyche	(Republic of Ireland) Séamus Coleman	Hummel	Stake.com	BOXT
Fulham	(Portugal) Marco Silva	(Scotland) Tom Cairney	Adidas	W88	World Mobile
Leeds United	(England) Sam Allardyce	(Scotland) Liam Cooper	Adidas	SBOTOP	Wish
Leicester City	(England) Dean Smith	(Northern Ireland) Jonny Evans	Adidas	FBS	Bia Saigon
Liverpool	(Germany) Jürgen Klopp	(England) Jordan Henderson	Nike	Standard Chartered	Expedia
Manchester City	(Spain) Pep Guardiola	(Germany) İlkay Gündoğan	Puma	Etihad Airways	Nexen Tire
Manchester United	(Netherlands) Erik ten Hag	(England) Harry Maguire	Adidas	TeamViewer	DXC Technology
Newcastle United	(England) Eddie Howe	(England) Jamaal Lascelles	Castore	FUN88	noon.com
Nottingham Forest	(Wales) Steve Cooper	(England) Joe Worrall	Macron	UNHCR^{1}	None
Southampton	(Spain) Rubén Sellés	(England) James Ward-Prowse	Hummel	Sportsbet.io	JD Sports
Tottenham Hotspur	(England) Ryan Mason (interim)	(France) Hugo Lloris	Nike	AIA	Cinch
West Ham United	(Scotland) David Moyes	(England) Declan Rice	Umbro	Betway	Scope Markets
Wolverhampton Wanderers	(Spain) Julen Lopetegui	(Portugal) Rúben Neves	Castore	AstroPay	12BET

1. Nottingham Forest played without a shirt sponsor until 1 January 2023, when the club announced UNHCR as their shirt sponsor for the remainder of the season.

=== Managerial changes ===
This season saw a record number of managerial changes, including 14 sackings.

Team	Outgoing manager	Manner of departure	Date of vacancy	Position in the table	Incoming manager	Date of appointment
Manchester United	(Germany) Ralf Rangnick	End of interim spell	22 May 2022	Pre-season	(Netherlands) Erik ten Hag	23 May 2022
Bournemouth	(England) Scott Parker	Sacked	30 August 2022	17th	(England) Gary O'Neil (Note: O'Neil was initially named as interim head coach, before being appointed on a permanent basis on 27 November 2022.)	30 August 2022
Chelsea	(Germany) Thomas Tuchel	Sacked	7 September 2022	6th	(England) Graham Potter	8 September 2022
Brighton & Hove Albion	(England) Graham Potter	Signed by Chelsea	8 September 2022	4th	(Italy) Roberto De Zerbi	18 September 2022
Wolverhampton Wanderers	(Portugal) Bruno Lage	Sacked	2 October 2022	18th	(England) Steve Davis (interim)	2 October 2022
Aston Villa	(England) Steven Gerrard	Sacked	20 October 2022	17th	(England) Aaron Danks (interim)	21 October 2022
Aston Villa	(England) Aaron Danks	End of interim spell	1 November 2022	16th	(Spain) Unai Emery	1 November 2022
Southampton	(Austria) Ralph Hasenhüttl	Sacked	7 November 2022	18th	(Wales) Nathan Jones	10 November 2022
Wolverhampton Wanderers	(England) Steve Davis	End of interim spell	14 November 2022	20th	(Spain) Julen Lopetegui	14 November 2022
Everton	(England) Frank Lampard	Sacked	23 January 2023	19th	(England) Sean Dyche	30 January 2023
Leeds United	(United States) Jesse Marsch	Sacked	6 February 2023	17th	(England) Michael Skubala (interim)	6 February 2023
Southampton	(Wales) Nathan Jones	Sacked	12 February 2023	20th	(Spain) Rubén Sellés (Note: Sellés was initially named as interim head coach, before being appointed on a permanent basis on 24 February 2023.)	12 February 2023
Leeds United	(England) Michael Skubala	End of interim spell	21 February 2023	19th	(Spain) Javi Gracia	21 February 2023
Crystal Palace	(France) Patrick Vieira	Sacked	17 March 2023	12th	(Republic of Ireland) Paddy McCarthy (interim)	17 March 2023
Crystal Palace	(Republic of Ireland) Paddy McCarthy	End of interim spell	21 March 2023	12th	(England) Roy Hodgson (interim)	21 March 2023
Tottenham Hotspur	(Italy) Antonio Conte	Mutual consent	26 March 2023	4th	(Italy) Cristian Stellini (interim)	26 March 2023
Leicester City	(Northern Ireland) Brendan Rodgers	Mutual consent	2 April 2023	19th	(England) Adam Sadler (interim)	4 April 2023
Chelsea	(England) Graham Potter	Sacked	2 April 2023	11th	(Spain) Bruno Saltor (interim)	2 April 2023
Chelsea	(Spain) Bruno Saltor	End of interim spell	6 April 2023	11th	(England) Frank Lampard (interim)	6 April 2023
Leicester City	(England) Adam Sadler	End of interim spell	10 April 2023	19th	(England) Dean Smith	10 April 2023
Tottenham Hotspur	(Italy) Cristian Stellini (interim)	Sacked	24 April 2023	5th	(England) Ryan Mason (interim)	24 April 2023
Leeds United	(Spain) Javi Gracia	Sacked	3 May 2023	17th	(England) Sam Allardyce	3 May 2023

== League table ==
Pos	Team	Pld	W	D	L	GF	GA	GD	Pts	Qualification or relegation
1	Manchester City (C)	38	28	5	5	94	33	+61	89	Qualification to Champions League group stage
2	Arsenal	38	26	6	6	88	43	+45	84	Qualification to Champions League group stage
3	Manchester United	38	23	6	9	58	43	+15	75	Qualification to Champions League group stage
4	Newcastle United	38	19	14	5	68	33	+35	71	Qualification to Champions League group stage
5	Liverpool	38	19	10	9	75	47	+28	67	Qualification to Europa League group stage (Note: Since the winners of the 2022–23 FA Cup, Manchester City, qualified for the Champions League, the spot given to the FA Cup winners (Europa League group stage) was passed to the sixth-placed team.)
6	Brighton & Hove Albion	38	18	8	12	72	53	+19	62	Qualification to Europa League group stage
7	Aston Villa	38	18	7	13	51	46	+5	61	Qualification to Europa Conference League play-off round (Note: Since the winners of the 2022–23 EFL Cup, Manchester United, qualified for the Champions League, the spot given to the League Cup winners (Europa Conference League play-off round) was passed to the seventh-placed team.)
8	Tottenham Hotspur	38	18	6	14	70	63	+7	60	
9	Brentford	38	15	14	9	58	46	+12	59	
10	Fulham	38	15	7	16	55	53	+2	52	
11	Crystal Palace	38	11	12	15	40	49	−9	45	
12	Chelsea	38	11	11	16	38	47	−9	44	
13	Wolverhampton Wanderers	38	11	8	19	31	58	−27	41	
14	West Ham United	38	11	7	20	42	55	−13	40	Qualification to Europa League group stage (Note: West Ham United qualified for the Europa League group stage by winning the 2022–23 UEFA Europa Conference League.)
15	Bournemouth	38	11	6	21	37	71	−34	39	
16	Nottingham Forest	38	9	11	18	38	68	−30	38	
17	Everton	38	8	12	18	34	57	−23	36	
18	Leicester City (R)	38	9	7	22	51	68	−17	34	Relegation to EFL Championship
19	Leeds United (R)	38	7	10	21	48	78	−30	31	Relegation to EFL Championship
20	Southampton (R)	38	6	7	25	36	73	−37	25	Relegation to EFL Championship

Source: Premier League
Rules for classification: 1) Points; 2) Goal difference; 3) Goals scored; 4) If the champions, relegated teams or qualified teams for UEFA competitions cannot be determined by rules 1 to 3, rules 4.1 to 4.3 are applied – 4.1) Points gained in head-to-head record between such teams; 4.2) Away goals scored in head-to-head record between such teams; 4.3) Play-offs
(C) Champions; (R) Relegated

== Results ==
The fixtures were released on 16 June 2022.

Home \ Away	ARS	AVL	BOU	BRE	BHA	CHE	CRY	EVE	FUL	LEE	LEI	LIV	MCI	MUN	NEW	NFO	SOU	TOT	WHU	WOL
Arsenal	—	2–1	3–2	1–1	0–3	3–1	4–1	4–0	2–1	4–1	4–2	3–2	1–3	3–2	0–0	5–0	3–3	3–1	3–1	5–0
Aston Villa	2–4	—	3–0	4–0	2–1	0–2	1–0	2–1	1–0	2–1	2–4	1–3	1–1	3–1	3–0	2–0	1–0	2–1	0–1	1–1
Bournemouth	0–3	2–0	—	0–0	0–2	1–3	0–2	3–0	2–1	4–1	2–1	1–0	1–4	0–1	1–1	1–1	0–1	2–3	0–4	0–0
Brentford	0–3	1–1	2–0	—	2–0	0–0	1–1	1–1	3–2	5–2	1–1	3–1	1–0	4–0	1–2	2–1	3–0	2–2	2–0	1–1
Brighton & Hove Albion	2–4	1–2	1–0	3–3	—	4–1	1–0	1–5	0–1	1–0	5–2	3–0	1–1	1–0	0–0	0–0	3–1	0–1	4–0	6–0
Chelsea	0–1	0–2	2–0	0–2	1–2	—	1–0	2–2	0–0	1–0	2–1	0–0	0–1	1–1	1–1	2–2	0–1	2–2	2–1	3–0
Crystal Palace	0–2	3–1	2–0	1–1	1–1	1–2	—	0–0	0–3	2–1	2–1	0–0	0–1	1–1	0–0	1–1	1–0	0–4	4–3	2–1
Everton	1–0	0–2	1–0	1–0	1–4	0–1	3–0	—	1–3	1–0	0–2	0–0	0–3	1–2	1–4	1–1	1–2	1–1	1–0	1–2
Fulham	0–3	3–0	2–2	3–2	2–1	2–1	2–2	0–0	—	2–1	5–3	2–2	1–2	1–2	1–4	2–0	2–1	0–1	0–1	1–1
Leeds United	0–1	0–0	4–3	0–0	2–2	3–0	1–5	1–1	2–3	—	1–1	1–6	1–3	0–2	2–2	2–1	1–0	1–4	2–2	2–1
Leicester City	0–1	1–2	0–1	2–2	2–2	1–3	0–0	2–2	0–1	2–0	—	0–3	0–1	0–1	0–3	4–0	1–2	4–1	2–1	2–1
Liverpool	2–2	1–1	9–0	1–0	3–3	0–0	1–1	2–0	1–0	1–2	2–1	—	1–0	7–0	2–1	3–2	3–1	4–3	1–0	2–0
Manchester City	4–1	3–1	4–0	1–2	3–1	1–0	4–2	1–1	2–1	2–1	3–1	4–1	—	6–3	2–0	6–0	4–0	4–2	3–0	3–0
Manchester United	3–1	1–0	3–0	1–0	1–2	4–1	2–1	2–0	2–1	2–2	3–0	2–1	2–1	—	0–0	3–0	0–0	2–0	1–0	2–0
Newcastle United	0–2	4–0	1–1	5–1	4–1	1–0	0–0	1–0	1–0	0–0	0–0	0–2	3–3	2–0	—	2–0	3–1	6–1	1–1	2–1
Nottingham Forest	1–0	1–1	2–3	2–2	3–1	1–1	1–0	2–2	2–3	1–0	2–0	1–0	1–1	0–2	1–2	—	4–3	0–2	1–0	1–1
Southampton	1–1	0–1	0–1	0–2	1–3	2–1	0–2	1–2	0–2	2–2	1–0	4–4	1–4	0–1	1–4	0–1	—	3–3	1–1	1–2
Tottenham Hotspur	0–2	0–2	2–3	1–3	2–1	2–0	1–0	2–0	2–1	4–3	6–2	1–2	1–0	2–2	1–2	3–1	4–1	—	2–0	1–0
West Ham United	2–2	1–1	2–0	0–2	0–2	1–1	1–2	2–0	3–1	3–1	0–2	1–2	0–2	1–0	1–5	4–0	1–0	1–1	—	2–0
Wolverhampton Wanderers	0–2	1–0	0–1	2–0	2–3	1–0	2–0	1–1	0–0	2–4	0–4	3–0	0–3	0–1	1–1	1–0	1–0	1–0	1–0	—

Source: Premier League
Legend: Blue = home team win; Yellow = draw; Red = away team win.
For upcoming matches, an "a" indicates there is an article about the rivalry between the two participants.

== Season statistics ==
=== Top scorers ===
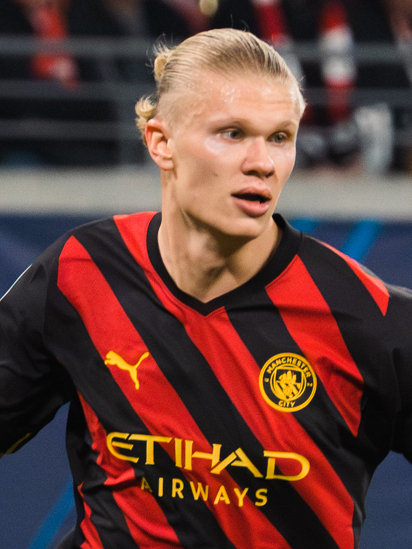
Erling Haaland won his first Premier League Golden Boot after scoring 36 goals, a record for a Premier League season.

Rank	Player	Club	Goals
1	(Norway) Erling Haaland	Manchester City	36
2	(England) Harry Kane	Tottenham Hotspur	30
3	(England) Ivan Toney	Brentford	20
4	(Egypt) Mohamed Salah	Liverpool	19
5	(England) Callum Wilson	Newcastle United	18
6	(England) Marcus Rashford	Manchester United	17
7	(Brazil) Gabriel Martinelli	Arsenal	15
7	(Norway) Martin Ødegaard	Arsenal	15
7	(England) Ollie Watkins	Aston Villa	15
10	(Serbia) Aleksandar Mitrović	Fulham	14
10	(England) Bukayo Saka	Arsenal	14

==== Hat-tricks ====
Player	For	Against	Result	Date
(Norway) Erling Haaland	Manchester City	Crystal Palace	4–2 (H)	27 August 2022
(Norway) Erling Haaland	Manchester City	Nottingham Forest	6–0 (H)	31 August 2022
(England) Ivan Toney	Brentford	Leeds United	5–2 (H)	3 September 2022
(South Korea) Son Heung-min	Tottenham Hotspur	Leicester City	6–2 (H)	17 September 2022
(Belgium) Leandro Trossard	Brighton & Hove Albion	Liverpool	3–3 (A)	1 October 2022
(Norway) Erling Haaland	Manchester City	Manchester United	6–3 (H)	2 October 2022
(England) Phil Foden	Manchester City	Manchester United	6–3 (H)	2 October 2022
(Norway) Erling Haaland	Manchester City	Wolverhampton Wanderers	3–0 (H)	22 January 2023

=== Clean sheets ===
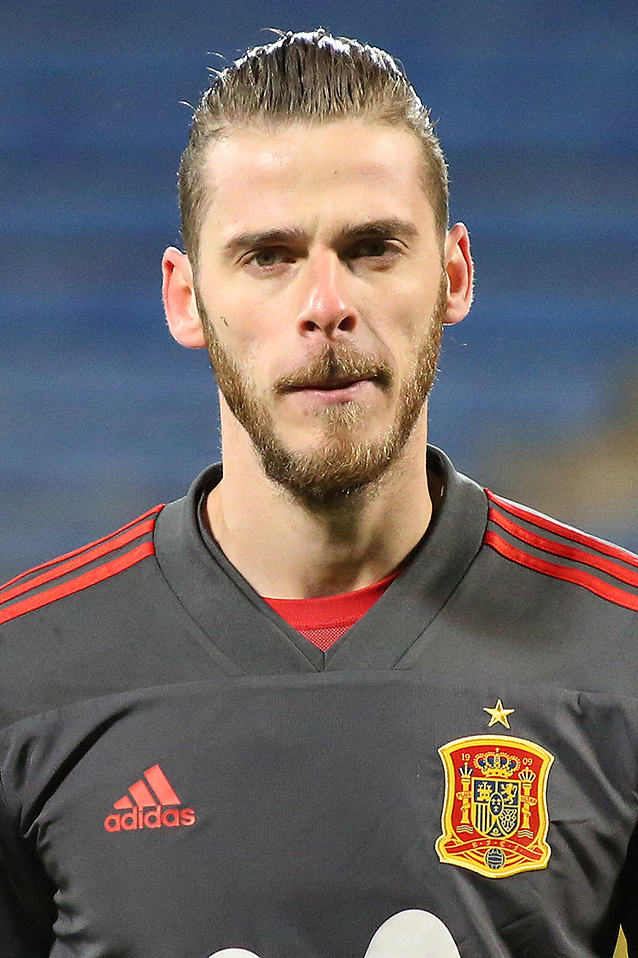
David de Gea won his second Premier League Golden Glove after keeping 17 clean sheets for Manchester United.

Rank	Player	Club	Clean sheets
1	(Spain) David de Gea	Manchester United	17
2	(Brazil) Alisson	Liverpool	14
2	(England) Nick Pope	Newcastle United	14
2	(England) Aaron Ramsdale	Arsenal	14
5	(Spain) David Raya	Brentford	12
6	(Brazil) Ederson	Manchester City	11
6	(Argentina) Emiliano Martínez	Aston Villa	11
6	(Portugal) José Sá	Wolverhampton Wanderers	11
9	(Spain) Kepa Arrizabalaga	Chelsea	9
10	(Poland) Łukasz Fabiański	West Ham United	8
10	(Germany) Bernd Leno	Fulham	8
10	(England) Jordan Pickford	Everton	8

=== Discipline ===
==== Player ====
- Most yellow cards: 14
  - (Portugal) João Palhinha (Fulham)
- Most red cards: 2
  - (Brazil) Casemiro (Manchester United)

==== Club ====
- Most yellow cards: 84
  - Leeds United
  - Nottingham Forest
  - Wolverhampton Wanderers
- Fewest yellow cards: 44
  - Manchester City
  - West Ham United
- Most red cards: 6
  - Wolverhampton Wanderers
- Fewest red cards: 0
  - Six teams

== Awards ==
=== Monthly awards ===
Month	Manager of the Month		Player of the Month		Goal of the Month		Save of the Month		References
Month	Manager	Club	Player	Club	Player	Club	Player	Club	References
August	(Spain) Mikel Arteta	Arsenal	(Norway) Erling Haaland	Manchester City	(France) Allan Saint-Maximin	Newcastle United	(England) Nick Pope	Newcastle United	
September	(Netherlands) Erik ten Hag	Manchester United	(England) Marcus Rashford	Manchester United	(England) Ivan Toney	Brentford	(England) Jordan Pickford	Everton	
October	(England) Eddie Howe	Newcastle United	(Paraguay) Miguel Almirón	Newcastle United	(Paraguay) Miguel Almirón	Newcastle United	(Spain) Kepa Arrizabalaga	Chelsea	
November/ December	(Spain) Mikel Arteta	Arsenal	(Norway) Martin Ødegaard	Arsenal	(England) Demarai Gray	Everton	(Republic of Ireland) Gavin Bazunu	Southampton	
January	(Spain) Mikel Arteta	Arsenal	(England) Marcus Rashford	Manchester United	(France) Michael Olise	Crystal Palace	(England) Nick Pope	Newcastle United	
February	(Netherlands) Erik ten Hag	Manchester United	(England) Marcus Rashford	Manchester United	(Brazil) Willian	Fulham	(Spain) David de Gea	Manchester United	
March	(Spain) Mikel Arteta	Arsenal	(England) Bukayo Saka	Arsenal	(Spain) Jonny	Wolverhampton Wanderers	(England) Aaron Ramsdale	Arsenal	
April	(Spain) Unai Emery	Aston Villa	(Norway) Erling Haaland	Manchester City	(Portugal) Matheus Nunes	Wolverhampton Wanderers	(England) Aaron Ramsdale	Arsenal	

=== Annual awards ===
Award	Winner	Club
Premier League Manager of the Season	(Spain) Pep Guardiola	Manchester City
Premier League Player of the Season	(Norway) Erling Haaland	Manchester City
Premier League Young Player of the Season	(Norway) Erling Haaland	Manchester City
Premier League Goal of the Season	(Paraguay) Julio Enciso	Brighton & Hove Albion
Premier League Save of the Season	(Spain) Kepa Arrizabalaga	Chelsea
Premier League Game Changer of the Season	(England) Reiss Nelson	Arsenal
Premier League Most Powerful Goal	(Algeria) Saïd Benrahma	West Ham United
PFA Players' Player of the Year	(Norway) Erling Haaland	Manchester City
PFA Young Player of the Year	(England) Bukayo Saka	Arsenal
PFA Fans' Player of the Year	(England) Marcus Rashford	Manchester United
FWA Footballer of the Year	(Norway) Erling Haaland	Manchester City

PFA Team of the Year
Goalkeeper	(England) Aaron Ramsdale (Arsenal)			
Defenders	(England) Kieran Trippier (Newcastle United)	(Portugal) Rúben Dias (Manchester City)	(England) John Stones (Manchester City)	(France) William Saliba (Arsenal)
Midfielders	(Belgium) Kevin De Bruyne (Manchester City)		(Spain) Rodri (Manchester City)	(Norway) Martin Ødegaard (Arsenal)
Forwards	(England) Bukayo Saka (Arsenal)		(Norway) Erling Haaland (Manchester City)	(England) Harry Kane (Tottenham Hotspur)

== Attendances ==
#	Football club	Home games	Average attendance
1	Manchester United	19	73,671
2	West Ham United	19	62,462
3	Tottenham Hotspur	19	61,585
4	Arsenal FC	19	60,191
5	Manchester City	19	53,249
6	Liverpool FC	19	53,183
7	Newcastle United	19	52,127
8	Aston Villa	19	41,707
9	Chelsea FC	19	40,002
10	Everton FC	19	39,241
11	Leeds United	19	36,566
12	Leicester City	19	31,887
13	Brighton & Hove Albion	19	31,477
14	Wolverhampton Wanderers	19	31,345
15	Southampton FC	19	30,440
16	Nottingham Forest	19	29,188
17	Crystal Palace FC	19	25,209
18	Fulham FC	19	23,746
19	Brentford FC	19	17,078
20	AFC Bournemouth	19	10,362
