= 2014–15 Premier League =

Football season in England

Premier League
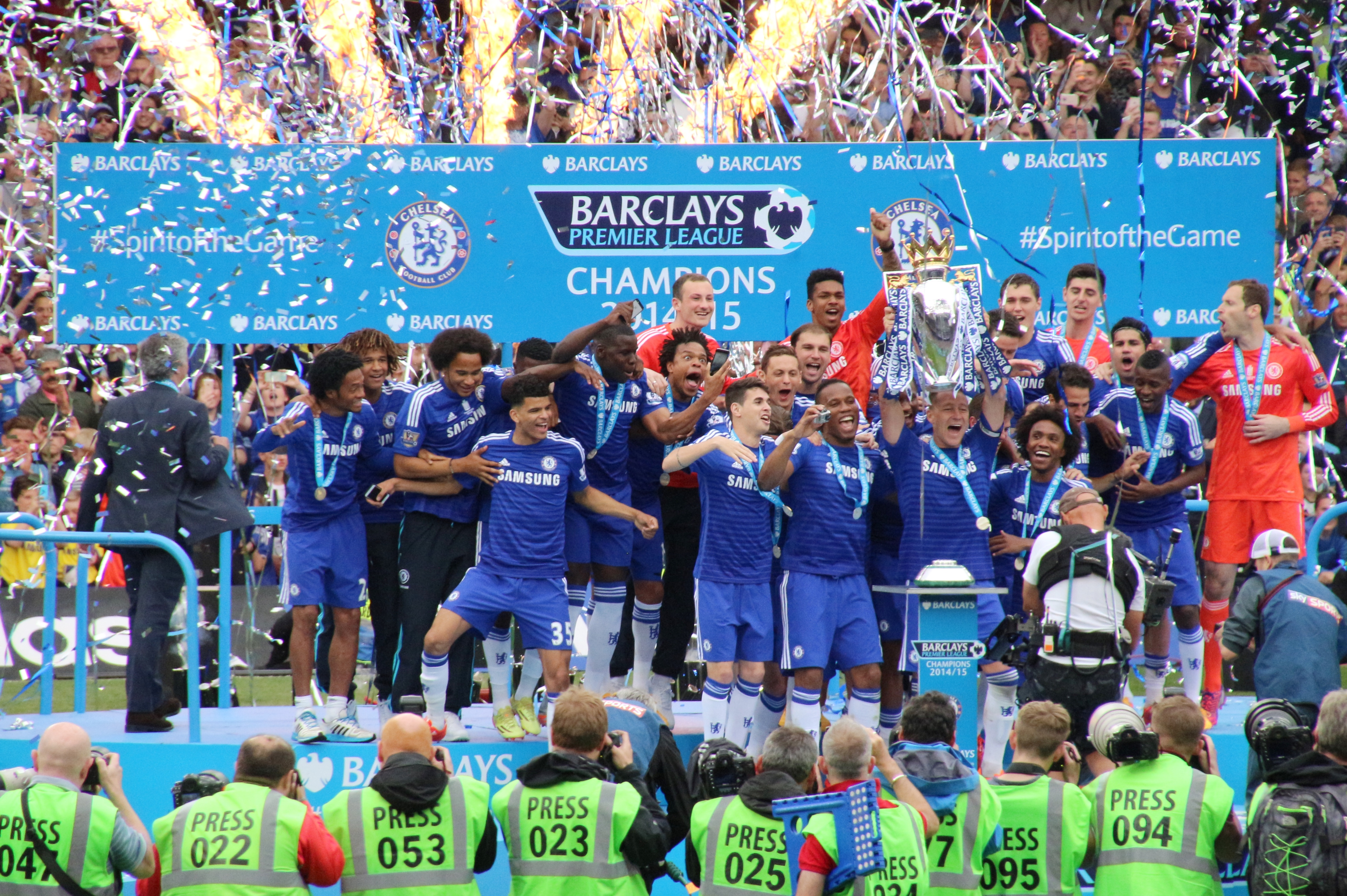
- Season: 2014–15
- Dates: 16 August 2014 – 24 May 2015
- Champions: Chelsea; 4th Premier League title 5th English title
- Relegated: Hull City; Burnley; Queens Park Rangers
- Champions League: Chelsea; Manchester City; Arsenal; Manchester United
- Europa League: Tottenham Hotspur; Liverpool; Southampton; West Ham United (through UEFA Respect Fair Play ranking)
- Matches: 380
- Goals: 975 (2.57 per match)
- Top goalscorer: Sergio Agüero (26 goals)
- Best goalkeeper: Joe Hart (14 clean sheets)
- Biggest home win: Southampton 8–0 Sunderland (18 October 2014)
- Biggest away win: Swansea City 0–5 Chelsea (17 January 2015)
- Highest scoring: Everton 3–6 Chelsea (30 August 2014)
- Longest winning run: 8 games Arsenal
- Longest unbeaten run: 16 games Manchester City
- Longest winless run: 13 games Leicester City
- Longest losing run: 8 games Newcastle United
- Highest attendance: 75,454; Manchester United 0–1 West Bromwich Albion (2 May 2015)
- Lowest attendance: 16,163; Queens Park Rangers 2–2 Stoke City (20 September 2014)
- Total attendance: 13,746,753
- Average attendance: 36,175

The 2014–15 Premier League (known as the Barclays Premier League for sponsorship reasons) was the 23rd season of the Premier League, the top English professional league for association football clubs, since its establishment in 1992, and the 116th season of top-flight English football overall. The fixtures were announced on 18 June 2014. The season started on 16 August 2014 and concluded on 24 May 2015.

Manchester City came into the season as defending champions of the 2013–14 season. Leicester City, Burnley and Queens Park Rangers entered as the three promoted teams.

On 3 May 2015, Chelsea won the title with three games to spare after a 1–0 home win over Crystal Palace. It was their first league title since 2010, their fourth Premier League title and their fifth English league title overall. Holders Manchester City eventually finished second, after a short drop to fourth a few weeks before the final match.

Burnley were the first team to be relegated on 9 May 2015 despite beating Hull City 1–0, while Queens Park Rangers suffered the same fate after a 6–0 demolition by Manchester City the next day. Hull City were the third and final team to be relegated after Newcastle United beat West Ham United 2–0. They drew 0–0 against Manchester United on the final day of the season.

Manchester City's Sergio Agüero won the Golden Boot with 26 goals, with his teammate Joe Hart clinching a record fourth Golden Glove, having kept 14 clean sheets. Eden Hazard and José Mourinho were named as Player and Manager of the Season respectively.

An independent commission later found that Manchester City breached Premier League financial rules during this season, part of a pattern of breaches spanning 2009-2018.

== Teams ==
Twenty teams competed in the league – the top seventeen teams from the previous season and the three teams promoted from the Championship. The promoted teams were Leicester City, Burnley and Queens Park Rangers, returning to the top flight after respective absences of ten years, four years and one year. They replaced Norwich City, Fulham and Cardiff City, who were relegated to the Championship after their respective top-flight spells of three years, thirteen years and one year.

=== Stadiums and locations ===
Locations of the 2014–15 Premier League teams
Greater London Premier League football clubs

| Team | Location | Stadium | Capacity |
|---|---|---|---|
| Arsenal | London (Holloway) | Emirates Stadium | 60,272 |
| Aston Villa | Birmingham | Villa Park | 42,682 |
| Burnley | Burnley | Turf Moor | 21,401 |
| Chelsea | London (Fulham) | Stamford Bridge | 41,798 |
| Crystal Palace | London (Selhurst) | Selhurst Park | 25,747 |
| Everton | Liverpool (Walton) | Goodison Park | 39,571 |
| Hull City | Kingston upon Hull | KC Stadium | 25,400 |
| Leicester City | Leicester | King Power Stadium | 32,312 |
| Liverpool | Liverpool (Anfield) | Anfield | 45,276 |
| Manchester City | Manchester (Bradford) | City of Manchester Stadium | 46,708 |
| Manchester United | Manchester (Old Trafford) | Old Trafford | 75,635 |
| Newcastle United | Newcastle upon Tyne | St James' Park | 52,405 |
| Queens Park Rangers | London (Shepherd's Bush) | Loftus Road | 18,000 |
| Southampton | Southampton | St Mary's Stadium | 32,505 |
| Stoke City | Stoke-on-Trent | Britannia Stadium | 27,740 |
| Sunderland | Sunderland | Stadium of Light | 48,707 |
| Swansea City | Swansea | Liberty Stadium | 20,827 |
| Tottenham Hotspur | London (Tottenham) | White Hart Lane | 36,284 |
| West Bromwich Albion | West Bromwich | The Hawthorns | 26,445 |
| West Ham United | London (Upton Park) | Boleyn Ground | 35,245 |

=== Personnel and kits ===
Note: Flags indicate national team as has been defined under FIFA eligibility rules. Players may hold more than one non-FIFA nationality.

| Team | Manager | Captain | Kit manufacturer | Shirt sponsor |
|---|---|---|---|---|
| Arsenal | (France) Arsène Wenger | (Spain) Mikel Arteta | Puma | Emirates |
| Aston Villa | (England) Tim Sherwood | (England) Fabian Delph | Macron | dafabet |
| Burnley | (England) Sean Dyche | (England) Jason Shackell | Puma | FUN88 |
| Chelsea | (Portugal) José Mourinho | (England) John Terry | Adidas | Samsung |
| Crystal Palace | (England) Alan Pardew | (Australia) Mile Jedinak | Macron | Neteller |
| Everton | (Spain) Roberto Martínez | (England) Phil Jagielka | Umbro | Chang |
| Hull City | (England) Steve Bruce | (England) Curtis Davies | Umbro | 12BET |
| Leicester City | (England) Nigel Pearson | (Jamaica) Wes Morgan | Puma | King Power |
| Liverpool | (Northern Ireland) Brendan Rodgers | (England) Steven Gerrard | Warrior | Standard Chartered |
| Manchester City | (Chile) Manuel Pellegrini | (Belgium) Vincent Kompany | Nike | Etihad Airways |
| Manchester United | (Netherlands) Louis van Gaal | (England) Wayne Rooney | Nike | Chevrolet |
| Newcastle United | (England) John Carver | (Argentina) Fabricio Coloccini | Puma | Wonga |
| Queens Park Rangers | (England) Chris Ramsey | (England) Clint Hill | Nike | AirAsia |
| Southampton | (Netherlands) Ronald Koeman | (Portugal) José Fonte | Made by club | Veho |
| Stoke City | (Wales) Mark Hughes | (England) Ryan Shawcross | Warrior | Bet365 |
| Sunderland | (Netherlands) Dick Advocaat | (Republic of Ireland) John O'Shea | Adidas | BFS Group |
| Swansea City | (England) Garry Monk | (Wales) Ashley Williams | Adidas | GWFX |
| Tottenham Hotspur | (Argentina) Mauricio Pochettino | (France) Younès Kaboul | Under Armour | AIA |
| West Bromwich Albion | (Wales) Tony Pulis | (Scotland) Darren Fletcher | Adidas | Intuit QuickBooks |
| West Ham United | (England) Sam Allardyce | (England) Kevin Nolan | Adidas | Betway^{1} |

1. West Ham United's shirt sponsor was Alpari until 6 February 2015 after the company was placed into administration in January 2015.

Additionally, referee kits are made by Nike, sponsored by EA Sports, and Nike has a new match ball, the Ordem Premier League.

=== Managerial changes ===
| Team | Outgoing manager | Manner of departure | Date of vacancy | League position | Incoming manager | Date of appointment |
|---|---|---|---|---|---|---|
| West Bromwich Albion | (Spain) Pepe Mel | Mutual consent | 12 May 2014 | Pre-season | (Scotland) Alan Irvine | 14 June 2014 |
| Tottenham Hotspur | (England) Tim Sherwood | Sacked | 13 May 2014 | Pre-season | (Argentina) Mauricio Pochettino | 27 May 2014 |
| Southampton | (Argentina) Mauricio Pochettino | Signed by Tottenham | 27 May 2014 | Pre-season | (Netherlands) Ronald Koeman | 16 June 2014 |
| Crystal Palace | (Wales) Tony Pulis | Mutual consent | 14 August 2014 | Pre-season | (England) Neil Warnock | 27 August 2014 |
| Crystal Palace | (England) Neil Warnock | Sacked | 27 December 2014 | 18th | (England) Alan Pardew | 2 January 2015 |
| West Bromwich Albion | (Scotland) Alan Irvine | Sacked | 29 December 2014 | 16th | (Wales) Tony Pulis | 1 January 2015 |
| Newcastle United | (England) Alan Pardew | Signed by Crystal Palace | 2 January 2015 | 10th | (England) John Carver | 26 January 2015 |
| Queens Park Rangers | (England) Harry Redknapp | Resigned | 3 February 2015 | 19th | (England) Chris Ramsey | 12 February 2015 |
| Aston Villa | (Scotland) Paul Lambert | Sacked | 11 February 2015 | 18th | (England) Tim Sherwood | 14 February 2015 |
| Sunderland | (Uruguay) Gus Poyet | Sacked | 16 March 2015 | 17th | (Netherlands) Dick Advocaat | 17 March 2015 |

== League table ==
| Pos | Team | Pld | W | D | L | GF | GA | GD | Pts | Qualification or relegation |
|---|---|---|---|---|---|---|---|---|---|---|
| 1 | Chelsea (C) | 38 | 26 | 9 | 3 | 73 | 32 | +41 | 87 | Qualification for the Champions League group stage |
| 2 | Manchester City | 38 | 24 | 7 | 7 | 83 | 38 | +45 | 79 | Qualification for the Champions League group stage |
| 3 | Arsenal | 38 | 22 | 9 | 7 | 71 | 36 | +35 | 75 | Qualification for the Champions League group stage |
| 4 | Manchester United | 38 | 20 | 10 | 8 | 62 | 37 | +25 | 70 | Qualification for the Champions League play-off round |
| 5 | Tottenham Hotspur | 38 | 19 | 7 | 12 | 58 | 53 | +5 | 64 | Qualification for the Europa League group stage (Note: Since winners of the 2014–15 FA Cup, Arsenal, and winners of the 2014–15 Football League Cup, Chelsea, qualified for the Champions League based on league position, the spot awarded to the FA Cup winners (Europa League group stage) was passed to the sixth-placed team, Liverpool, and the spot awarded to the League Cup winners (Europa League third qualifying round) was passed to the seventh-placed team, Southampton, since those teams were the first teams in the table not already qualified for any European competition.) |
| 6 | Liverpool | 38 | 18 | 8 | 12 | 52 | 48 | +4 | 62 | Qualification for the Europa League group stage |
| 7 | Southampton | 38 | 18 | 6 | 14 | 54 | 33 | +21 | 60 | Qualification for the Europa League third qualifying round |
| 8 | Swansea City | 38 | 16 | 8 | 14 | 46 | 49 | −3 | 56 | |
| 9 | Stoke City | 38 | 15 | 9 | 14 | 48 | 45 | +3 | 54 | |
| 10 | Crystal Palace | 38 | 13 | 9 | 16 | 47 | 51 | −4 | 48 | |
| 11 | Everton | 38 | 12 | 11 | 15 | 48 | 50 | −2 | 47 | |
| 12 | West Ham United | 38 | 12 | 11 | 15 | 44 | 47 | −3 | 47 | Qualification for the Europa League first qualifying round (Note: England was given an extra qualification berth for the Europa League first qualifying round as one of the top three associations in UEFA Respect Fair Play ranking. The spot was given to West Ham United after finishing on top of the Premier League Fair Play table.) |
| 13 | West Bromwich Albion | 38 | 11 | 11 | 16 | 38 | 51 | −13 | 44 | |
| 14 | Leicester City | 38 | 11 | 8 | 19 | 46 | 55 | −9 | 41 | |
| 15 | Newcastle United | 38 | 10 | 9 | 19 | 40 | 63 | −23 | 39 | |
| 16 | Sunderland | 38 | 7 | 17 | 14 | 31 | 53 | −22 | 38 | |
| 17 | Aston Villa | 38 | 10 | 8 | 20 | 31 | 57 | −26 | 38 | |
| 18 | Hull City (R) | 38 | 8 | 11 | 19 | 33 | 51 | −18 | 35 | Relegation to Football League Championship |
| 19 | Burnley (R) | 38 | 7 | 12 | 19 | 28 | 53 | −25 | 33 | Relegation to Football League Championship |
| 20 | Queens Park Rangers (R) | 38 | 8 | 6 | 24 | 42 | 73 | −31 | 30 | Relegation to Football League Championship |

Source: Barclays Premier League
Rules for classification: 1) Points; 2) Goal difference; 3) Goals scored; 4) Play-offs (only if needed to decide champion, teams for relegation or teams for UEFA competitions).
(C) Champions; (R) Relegated

== Results ==
On 3 May 2015, Chelsea beat Crystal Palace 1–0 to secure the Premier League title with three games to play. PFA Player of the Year winner Eden Hazard scored the winning goal near the end of the first half, heading in the rebound of his own penalty kick. The win left Chelsea 16 points ahead of Arsenal, which had five games remaining. Chelsea were atop the standings the entire year, having got off to a good start. For Chelsea, it was the fourth title in the last eleven years, but first in the last six seasons. It was the fifth title in the club's 110-year history. "We showed absolutely everything since day one, everything football demands from a team," said manager José Mourinho. "We had fantastic attacking football, we had fantastic domination ... we defended amazingly well." It was Mourinho's 22nd career title. He won titles at Chelsea in 2005 and 2006, before being forced out by owner Roman Abramovich, and returning in 2013. Diego Costa led Chelsea with 20 goals.

| Home \ Away | ARS | AVL | BUR | CHE | CRY | EVE | HUL | LEI | LIV | MCI | MUN | NEW | QPR | SOU | STK | SUN | SWA | TOT | WBA | WHU |
|---|---|---|---|---|---|---|---|---|---|---|---|---|---|---|---|---|---|---|---|---|
| Arsenal | — | 5–0 | 3–0 | 0–0 | 2–1 | 2–0 | 2–2 | 2–1 | 4–1 | 2–2 | 1–2 | 4–1 | 2–1 | 1–0 | 3–0 | 0–0 | 0–1 | 1–1 | 4–1 | 3–0 |
| Aston Villa | 0–3 | — | 0–1 | 1–2 | 0–0 | 3–2 | 2–1 | 2–1 | 0–2 | 0–2 | 1–1 | 0–0 | 3–3 | 1–1 | 1–2 | 0–0 | 0–1 | 1–2 | 2–1 | 1–0 |
| Burnley | 0–1 | 1–1 | — | 1–3 | 2–3 | 1–3 | 1–0 | 0–1 | 0–1 | 1–0 | 0–0 | 1–1 | 2–1 | 1–0 | 0–0 | 0–0 | 0–1 | 0–0 | 2–2 | 1–3 |
| Chelsea | 2–0 | 3–0 | 1–1 | — | 1–0 | 1–0 | 2–0 | 2–0 | 1–1 | 1–1 | 1–0 | 2–0 | 2–1 | 1–1 | 2–1 | 3–1 | 4–2 | 3–0 | 2–0 | 2–0 |
| Crystal Palace | 1–2 | 0–1 | 0–0 | 1–2 | — | 0–1 | 0–2 | 2–0 | 3–1 | 2–1 | 1–2 | 1–1 | 3–1 | 1–3 | 1–1 | 1–3 | 1–0 | 2–1 | 0–2 | 1–3 |
| Everton | 2–2 | 3–0 | 1–0 | 3–6 | 2–3 | — | 1–1 | 2–2 | 0–0 | 1–1 | 3–0 | 3–0 | 3–1 | 1–0 | 0–1 | 0–2 | 0–0 | 0–1 | 0–0 | 2–1 |
| Hull City | 1–3 | 2–0 | 0–1 | 2–3 | 2–0 | 2–0 | — | 0–1 | 1–0 | 2–4 | 0–0 | 0–3 | 2–1 | 0–1 | 1–1 | 1–1 | 0–1 | 1–2 | 0–0 | 2–2 |
| Leicester City | 1–1 | 1–0 | 2–2 | 1–3 | 0–1 | 2–2 | 0–0 | — | 1–3 | 0–1 | 5–3 | 3–0 | 5–1 | 2–0 | 0–1 | 0–0 | 2–0 | 1–2 | 0–1 | 2–1 |
| Liverpool | 2–2 | 0–1 | 2–0 | 1–2 | 1–3 | 1–1 | 0–0 | 2–2 | — | 2–1 | 1–2 | 2–0 | 2–1 | 2–1 | 1–0 | 0–0 | 4–1 | 3–2 | 2–1 | 2–0 |
| Manchester City | 0–2 | 3–2 | 2–2 | 1–1 | 3–0 | 1–0 | 1–1 | 2–0 | 3–1 | — | 1–0 | 5–0 | 6–0 | 2–0 | 0–1 | 3–2 | 2–1 | 4–1 | 3–0 | 2–0 |
| Manchester United | 1–1 | 3–1 | 3–1 | 1–1 | 1–0 | 2–1 | 3–0 | 3–1 | 3–0 | 4–2 | — | 3–1 | 4–0 | 0–1 | 2–1 | 2–0 | 1–2 | 3–0 | 0–1 | 2–1 |
| Newcastle United | 1–2 | 1–0 | 3–3 | 2–1 | 3–3 | 3–2 | 2–2 | 1–0 | 1–0 | 0–2 | 0–1 | — | 1–0 | 1–2 | 1–1 | 0–1 | 2–3 | 1–3 | 1–1 | 2–0 |
| Queens Park Rangers | 1–2 | 2–0 | 2–0 | 0–1 | 0–0 | 1–2 | 0–1 | 3–2 | 2–3 | 2–2 | 0–2 | 2–1 | — | 0–1 | 2–2 | 1–0 | 1–1 | 1–2 | 3–2 | 0–0 |
| Southampton | 2–0 | 6–1 | 2–0 | 1–1 | 1–0 | 3–0 | 2–0 | 2–0 | 0–2 | 0–3 | 1–2 | 4–0 | 2–1 | — | 1–0 | 8–0 | 0–1 | 2–2 | 0–0 | 0–0 |
| Stoke City | 3–2 | 0–1 | 1–2 | 0–2 | 1–2 | 2–0 | 1–0 | 0–1 | 6–1 | 1–4 | 1–1 | 1–0 | 3–1 | 2–1 | — | 1–1 | 2–1 | 3–0 | 2–0 | 2–2 |
| Sunderland | 0–2 | 0–4 | 2–0 | 0–0 | 1–4 | 1–1 | 1–3 | 0–0 | 0–1 | 1–4 | 1–1 | 1–0 | 0–2 | 2–1 | 3–1 | — | 0–0 | 2–2 | 0–0 | 1–1 |
| Swansea City | 2–1 | 1–0 | 1–0 | 0–5 | 1–1 | 1–1 | 3–1 | 2–0 | 0–1 | 2–4 | 2–1 | 2–2 | 2–0 | 0–1 | 2–0 | 1–1 | — | 1–2 | 3–0 | 1–1 |
| Tottenham Hotspur | 2–1 | 0–1 | 2–1 | 5–3 | 0–0 | 2–1 | 2–0 | 4–3 | 0–3 | 0–1 | 0–0 | 1–2 | 4–0 | 1–0 | 1–2 | 2–1 | 3–2 | — | 0–1 | 2–2 |
| West Bromwich Albion | 0–1 | 1–0 | 4–0 | 3–0 | 2–2 | 0–2 | 1–0 | 2–3 | 0–0 | 1–3 | 2–2 | 0–2 | 1–4 | 1–0 | 1–0 | 2–2 | 2–0 | 0–3 | — | 1–2 |
| West Ham United | 1–2 | 0–0 | 1–0 | 0–1 | 1–3 | 1–2 | 3–0 | 2–0 | 3–1 | 2–1 | 1–1 | 1–0 | 2–0 | 1–3 | 1–1 | 1–0 | 3–1 | 0–1 | 1–1 | — |

Source: Barclays Premier League football scores & results
Legend: Blue = home team win; Yellow = draw; Red = away team win.

== Season statistics ==
=== Scoring ===
==== Top scorers ====
| Rank | Player | Club | Goals |
|---|---|---|---|
| 1 | (Argentina) Sergio Agüero | Manchester City | 26 |
| 2 | (England) Harry Kane | Tottenham Hotspur | 21 |
| 3 | (Spain) Diego Costa | Chelsea | 20 |
| 4 | (England) Charlie Austin | Queens Park Rangers | 18 |
| 5 | (Chile) Alexis Sánchez | Arsenal | 16 |
| 6 | (England) Saido Berahino | West Bromwich Albion | 14 |
| 6 | (France) Olivier Giroud | Arsenal | 14 |
| 6 | (Belgium) Eden Hazard | Chelsea | 14 |
| 9 | (Belgium) Christian Benteke | Aston Villa | 13 |
| 10 | (Italy) Graziano Pellè | Southampton | 12 |
| 10 | (England) Wayne Rooney | Manchester United | 12 |
| 10 | (Spain) David Silva | Manchester City | 12 |

==== Hat-tricks ====
| Player | For | Against | Result | Date |
|---|---|---|---|---|
| (Spain) Diego Costa | Chelsea | Swansea City | 4–2 | 13 September 2014 |
| (Argentina) Sergio Agüero^{4} | Manchester City | Tottenham Hotspur | 4–1 | 18 October 2014 |
| (England) Charlie Austin | Queens Park Rangers | West Bromwich Albion | 3–2 | 20 December 2014 |
| (Republic of Ireland) Jonathan Walters | Stoke City | Queens Park Rangers | 3–1 | 31 January 2015 |
| (England) Harry Kane | Tottenham Hotspur | Leicester City | 4–3 | 21 March 2015 |
| (Belgium) Christian Benteke | Aston Villa | Queens Park Rangers | 3–3 | 7 April 2015 |
| (Democratic Republic of the Congo) Yannick Bolasie | Crystal Palace | Sunderland | 4–1 | 11 April 2015 |
| (Argentina) Sergio Agüero | Manchester City | Queens Park Rangers | 6–0 | 10 May 2015 |
| (Senegal) Sadio Mané | Southampton | Aston Villa | 6–1 | 16 May 2015 |
| (England) Theo Walcott | Arsenal | West Bromwich Albion | 4–1 | 24 May 2015 |

^{4} Player scored 4 goals

=== Clean sheets ===
| Rank | Player | Club | Clean sheets |
|---|---|---|---|
| 1 | (England) Joe Hart | Manchester City | 14 |
| 2 | (Poland) Łukasz Fabiański | Swansea City | 13 |
| 2 | (England) Fraser Forster | Southampton | 13 |
| 2 | (Belgium) Simon Mignolet | Liverpool | 13 |
| 5 | (Belgium) Thibaut Courtois | Chelsea | 12 |
| 6 | (England) Ben Foster | West Bromwich Albion | 11 |
| 6 | (Romania) Costel Pantilimon | Sunderland | 11 |
| 8 | (Spain) David de Gea | Manchester United | 10 |
| 8 | (England) Tom Heaton | Burnley | 10 |
| 10 | (United States) Brad Guzan | Aston Villa | 9 |

=== Discipline ===
==== Player ====
- Most yellow cards: 14
  - (England) Lee Cattermole (Sunderland)
- Most red cards: 2
  - (England) Tom Huddlestone (Hull City)
  - (England) Paul Konchesky (Leicester City)
  - (England) Kyle Naughton (Tottenham Hotspur)
  - (France) Moussa Sissoko (Newcastle United)
  - (England) Mike Williamson (Newcastle United)

==== Club ====
- Most yellow cards: 94
  - Sunderland
- Most red cards: 7
  - Aston Villa
  - Newcastle United

== Awards ==
=== Monthly awards ===
| Month | Manager of the Month | | Player of the Month | | Reference |
| Month | Manager | Club | Player | Club | Reference |
|---|---|---|---|---|---|
| August | (England) Garry Monk | Swansea City | (Spain) Diego Costa | Chelsea | |
| September | (Netherlands) Ronald Koeman | Southampton | (Italy) Graziano Pellè | Southampton | |
| October | (England) Sam Allardyce | West Ham United | (Senegal) Diafra Sakho | West Ham United | |
| November | (England) Alan Pardew | Newcastle United | (Argentina) Sergio Agüero | Manchester City | |
| December | (Chile) Manuel Pellegrini | Manchester City | (England) Charlie Austin | Queens Park Rangers | |
| January | (Netherlands) Ronald Koeman | Southampton | (England) Harry Kane | Tottenham Hotspur | |
| February | (Wales) Tony Pulis | West Bromwich Albion | (England) Harry Kane | Tottenham Hotspur | |
| March | (France) Arsène Wenger | Arsenal | (France) Olivier Giroud | Arsenal | |
| April | (England) Nigel Pearson | Leicester City | (Belgium) Christian Benteke | Aston Villa | |

=== Annual awards ===
| Award | Winner | Club |
|---|---|---|
| Premier League Manager of the Season | (Portugal) José Mourinho | Chelsea |
| Premier League Player of the Season | (Belgium) Eden Hazard | Chelsea |
| PFA Players' Player of the Year | (Belgium) Eden Hazard | Chelsea |
| PFA Young Player of the Year | (England) Harry Kane | Tottenham Hotspur |
| FWA Footballer of the Year | (Belgium) Eden Hazard | Chelsea |

PFA Team of the Year
| Goalkeeper | (Spain) David de Gea (Manchester United) | | | |
| Defence | (Serbia) Branislav Ivanović (Chelsea) | (England) John Terry (Chelsea) | (England) Gary Cahill (Chelsea) | (England) Ryan Bertrand (Southampton) |
| Midfield | (Chile) Alexis Sánchez (Arsenal) | (Serbia) Nemanja Matić (Chelsea) | (Brazil) Philippe Coutinho (Liverpool) | (Belgium) Eden Hazard (Chelsea) |
| Attack | (Spain) Diego Costa (Chelsea) | | (England) Harry Kane (Tottenham Hotspur) | |

== Attendances ==
| # | Football club | Home games | Average attendance |
|---|---|---|---|
| 1 | Manchester United | 19 | 75,335 |
| 2 | Arsenal FC | 19 | 59,992 |
| 3 | Newcastle United | 19 | 50,359 |
| 4 | Manchester City | 19 | 45,365 |
| 5 | Liverpool FC | 19 | 44,659 |
| 6 | Sunderland AFC | 19 | 43,157 |
| 7 | Chelsea FC | 19 | 41,546 |
| 8 | Everton FC | 19 | 38,406 |
| 9 | Tottenham Hotspur | 19 | 35,728 |
| 10 | West Ham United | 19 | 34,871 |
| 11 | Aston Villa | 19 | 34,133 |
| 12 | Leicester City | 19 | 31,693 |
| 13 | Southampton FC | 19 | 30,652 |
| 14 | Stoke City | 19 | 27,081 |
| 15 | West Bromwich Albion | 19 | 25,064 |
| 16 | Crystal Palace | 19 | 24,421 |
| 17 | Hull City | 19 | 23,557 |
| 18 | Swansea City | 19 | 20,555 |
| 19 | Burnley FC | 19 | 19,131 |
| 20 | Queens Park Rangers | 19 | 17,809 |
