= Andreas Fehse =

German footballer and scout

Personal information
- Date of birth: 1 November 1958 (age 67)
- Place of birth: West Germany
- Height: 1.80 m (5 ft 11 in)
- Position: Defender

Team information
- Current team: Newcastle United (scout)

Senior career*
Years	Team	Apps	(Gls)
1977–1983	Bayer Leverkusen	2	(0)
1983–1984	Rot-Weiss Essen	23	(0)
- * Club domestic league appearances and goals

Andreas Fehse (born 1 November 1958) is a German former professional footballer and football scout who works as a senior European scout for Premier League club Newcastle United.

As a player, he represented Bayer Leverkusen and Rot-Weiss Essen, before beginning a scouting career that has included roles with Bayer Leverkusen, 1. FC Kaiserslautern, Southampton, Rangers and Nottingham Forest.

== Playing career ==
Fehse played for Bayer Leverkusen, appearing primarily outside the club's first team. He made his professional debut on 3 March 1978 in a 2. Bundesliga match against Arminia Hannover. Leverkusen went on to win the northern division of the 2. Bundesliga in 1978–79 and secure promotion to the Bundesliga.

Fehse later made one Bundesliga appearance for Leverkusen, playing against Eintracht Braunschweig on 4 June 1983. He also appeared for the club in the DFB-Pokal.

In the summer of 1983, Fehse joined Rot-Weiss Essen in the 2. Bundesliga. He made 23 league appearances during the 1983–84 season, in which Essen finished 17th and were relegated. He also made one DFB-Pokal appearance for the club.

== Scouting career ==
=== Bayer Leverkusen ===
After his playing career, Fehse returned to Bayer Leverkusen, initially working as a youth coach before moving into scouting. He joined the club's newly established scouting department and specialised in international markets, particularly South America. By 2010, he had spent twelve years scouting the region for Leverkusen.

His work for Leverkusen included scouting in Brazil, Argentina and other South American markets.

=== 1. FC Kaiserslautern ===
In January 2011, Fehse left Leverkusen to become head of scouting at 1. FC Kaiserslautern. Head coach Marco Kurz described his appointment as important to the development of the club's recruitment structure, citing Fehse's experience and extensive network after twelve years in Leverkusen's scouting department.

=== Southampton ===
From January 2015, Fehse worked on a freelance basis as a senior scout for Premier League club Southampton, with responsibility for European markets and a particular focus on German-speaking countries. In August 2015, he was reported to have watched Leon Goretzka on Southampton's behalf during a match involving Schalke 04.

=== Rangers ===
In January 2020, Fehse began working as lead European scout for Scottish Premiership club Rangers. He continued to work on a freelance basis, with responsibility for identifying and assessing players across European markets.

=== Nottingham Forest ===
Fehse joined Premier League club Nottingham Forest in July 2023 as a senior European scout.

=== Newcastle United ===
In December 2025, Fehse joined Newcastle United as a senior European scout.
