= TGP Europe =

Online gambling company

- Available in: Multilingual
- Founded: 2014; 12 years ago
- Headquarters: Douglas, {{{location_country}}}
- Area served: Europe
- Industry: Online gambling
- Services: Online betting and gaming
- Website: tgpeurope.com

TGP Europe is a company operating multiple online gambling websites, located in Douglas, Isle of Man.

== Services ==
TGP Europe manages white-label partnerships for various overseas gambling businesses. In order to access the UK market a number of firms use TGP Europe, an intermediary company based in Douglas on the Isle of Man.

TGP Europe currently operates (as of 13 April 2023) the following domains through white label partnerships:

12bet.uk	White Label
96uk.com	White Label
bj-88.co.uk	White Label
de-bet.co.uk	White Label
duelbits.co.uk	White Label
fun88.co.uk	White Label
nova88bet.co.uk	White Label
sbotop.co.uk	White Label
sportsbetio.uk	White Label
tlcbet.co.uk	White Label
uk-wl.co.uk	White Label
Betvision.com	Brand
sportpesa.uk	White Label
bcgame.uk	White Label

== Money laundering ==
In 2023 the UK Gambling Commission imposed a £316,250 ($394,079) fine on TGP Europe as part of a regulatory settlement. The decision follows an investigation revealing lapses in social responsibility and anti-money laundering measures. In addition to the fine, TGP Europe received an official warning and saw conditions added to its operating license.

On 16 May 2025, TGP Europe surrendered their UK license after breaching anti money laundering rules. They chose to exit the UK market after being fined £3.3 million for rule breaching and for deciding against improvements set by the UK Gambling Commission.

== Sponsorships ==
=== DEBET ===
- Wolverhampton Wanderers

=== 12BET ===
- Wolverhampton Wanderers (sleeve)

=== SBOTOP ===
- Fulham
- Leeds United

=== Kaiyun Sports ===
- Aston Villa
- Crystal Palace
- Nottingham Forest
- SS Lazio (sleeve)

=== FUN88 ===
- Burnley
- Newcastle United
- Tottenham Hotspur

=== Stake.com ===
- UFC fighter Israel Adesanya
- Gillingham
- Enyimba
- Watford
- Everton
- Sergio Agüero
- Pietro Fittipaldi
- Enzo Fittipaldi
- Drake
- Gennady Golovkin vs. Ryōta Murata boxing match
- Sauber Motorsport
