= FUN88 =

Online gambling company

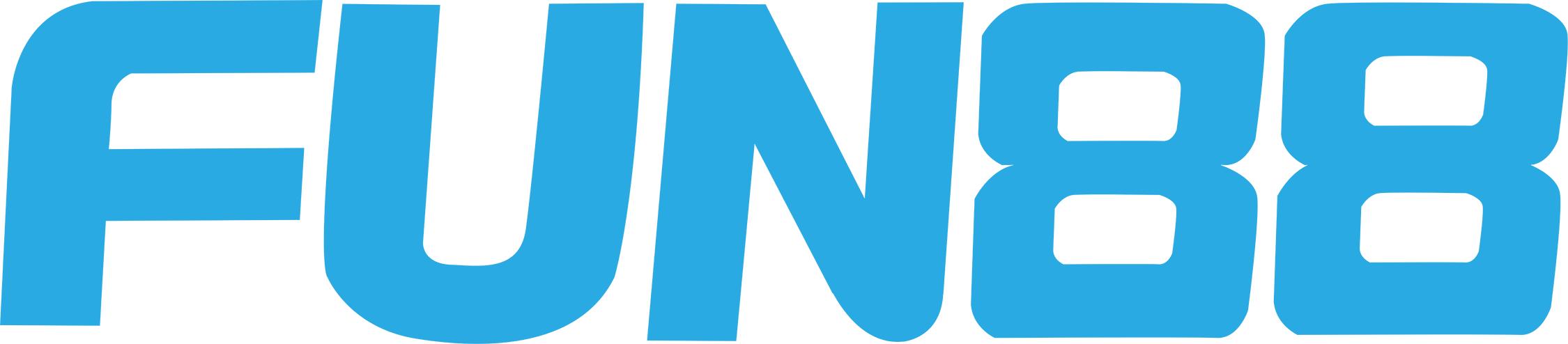
- Available in: Multilingual
- Founded: 2008
- Area served: Asia Pacific region / Europe / South America
- Owner: Kamchiya Technology Limited
- Industry: Online gambling
- Services: Online betting and gaming
- Website: en.fun88.com

FUN88 is an online betting site. The company was founded in China and currently operates in Asia, Europe and South America. In the UK, FUN88 operates through a white-label partnership with TGP Europe and is regulated by the Gambling Commission in Great Britain.

== History ==
FUN88 was founded in June 2008. The company operated first in Asia before expanding to Europe in the same year, establishing a headquarters in the Isle of Man along with several other betting outfits. FUN88 then gained exposure through a number of Premier League sponsorship deals, firstly with Burnley FC and then Tottenham Hotspur and Newcastle United.

== Sponsorship ==
FUN88 has partnered with athletes and clubs in recent years, most notably the late Kobe Bryant, Newcastle United and Tottenham Hotspur. FUN88's first major European sponsorship deal was with Premier League side Burnley FC between 2010 and 2012. They were then announced as Tottenham Hotspur's Asian Betting and Gaming Partner in 2014, a partnership that has lasted for almost a decade. In 2017, Newcastle United unveiled FUN88 as their front-of-shirt sponsor in a long-term deal. In April 2023, Premier League clubs agreed to phase out front-of-shirt betting sponsors with a deadline set at the beginning of 2026/27 season. The Athletic reported that sleeve-sponsorship and perimeter advertising will still be prominent. In June 2023, it was confirmed that FUN88 would no longer sponsor Newcastle United on the front-of-shirt and they entered into a long-term deal as Asian betting partner. The deal was widely-reported to have been agreed in order for Newcastle to pursue a more lucrative sponsor. The club confirmed a record deal with Saudi Arabian events company, Sela, worth £25m per year shortly afterwards.

Fun88 India partnered with Dabang Delhi KC as Title sponsor.

FUN88 brand ambassadors have included Iker Casillas, Steve Nash, Daren Sammy, Dale Steyn and Tony Parker.
