= Newcastle United F.C. =

Association football club in England

Newcastle United
- Full name: Newcastle United Football Club
- Nicknames: The Magpies; The Toon Army; Geordies (supporters)
- Founded: November 15, 1881; 145 years ago (as Stanley F.C.); 1882; 144 years ago (as East End F.C.); 1892; 134 years ago (as Newcastle United F.C.)
- Ground: St James' Park
- Capacity: 52,729
- Owners: Public Investment Fund (85%); RB Sports & Media (15%)
- Chairman: Yasir Al-Rumayyan
- Head coach: Matthias Jaissle
- League: Premier League
- 2025–26: Premier League, 12th of 20
- Website: newcastleunited.com
Home colours	Away colours	Third colours

Newcastle United Football Club is a professional association football club based in Newcastle upon Tyne, Tyne and Wear, England. The club competes in the Premier League, the top tier of English football. Founded in 1881 as Stanley F.C., the club took on its present guise in 1892 after absorbing the assets of defunct local rivals Newcastle West End, including their home stadium St. James' Park, where United have played ever since. Located in the centre of Newcastle, St. James' Park currently has a capacity of 52,769.

Newcastle United have won four top-flight league titles, six FA Cups, one League Cup and an FA Charity Shield, as well as the Inter-Cities Fairs Cup, the ninth-highest total of trophies won by an English club. The club's most successful period was between 1904 and 1910, when they won an FA Cup and three of their four League titles. More recently, the club were League or FA Cup runners-up on four occasions in the 1990s. Newcastle were relegated in 2009, and again in 2016. The club won promotion at the first time of asking each time, returning to the Premier League, as Championship winners, in 2010 and 2017. In October 2021, a consortium led by the Public Investment Fund, the sovereign wealth fund of Saudi Arabia, became majority owners of Newcastle United. In 2025, the club won the 2024–25 EFL Cup, the club's first trophy in nearly 56 years, and their first domestic trophy since 1955.

Newcastle share a long-standing rivalry with nearby Sunderland, with whom the Tyne–Wear derby is contested. The club's traditional kit colours are black-and-white striped shirts, black shorts and black or white socks. Their crest has elements of the city coat of arms, which features two grey hippocamps. Before each home game, the team enters the pitch to "Going Home".

== History ==
=== 1881–1903: Formation and early history ===
A chart showing the progress of Newcastle United Football Club from its entry into the League in 1894 to the present. Newcastle have won the league on four occasions.

The first record of football being played on Tyneside dates from 3 March 1877 at Elswick Rugby Club. Later that year, Newcastle's first football club, Tyne Association, was formed. The origins of Newcastle United Football Club itself can be traced back to the formation of a football club by the Stanley Cricket Club of Byker on November 15, 1881. This team was renamed Newcastle East End F.C. in October 1882, to avoid confusion with the cricket club in Stanley, County Durham. Rosewood F.C. of Byker merged with Newcastle East End a short time later. In 1886, Newcastle East End moved from Byker to Heaton. In August 1882, Newcastle West End F.C. formed from West End Cricket Club, and in May 1886 moved into St. James' Park. The two clubs became rivals in the Northern League. In 1889, Newcastle East End became a professional team, before becoming a limited company the following March. Newcastle West End, on the other hand, was in serious financial trouble and approached East End with a view to a takeover. Newcastle West End was eventually dissolved, and a number of its players and backroom staff joined Newcastle East End, with Newcastle East End taking over the lease on St. James' Park in May 1892.

With only one senior club in the city for fans to support, development of the club was much more rapid. Despite being refused entry to the Football League's First Division at the start of the 1892–93 season, they were invited to play in their new Second Division. However, with no big names playing in the Second Division, they turned down the offer and remained in the Northern League, stating "gates would not meet the heavy expenses incurred for travelling". In a bid to start drawing larger crowds, Newcastle East End decided to adopt a new name in recognition of the merger. Suggested names included 1892 Newcastle, Newcastle Rangers, Newcastle City and City of Newcastle, but Newcastle United was decided upon on 9 December 1892, to signify the unification of the two teams. The name change was accepted by the Football Association on 22 December, but the club was not legally constituted as Newcastle United Football Club Co. Ltd. until 6 September 1895. At the start of the 1893–94 season, Newcastle United were once again refused entry to the First Division and so joined the Second Division, along with Liverpool and Woolwich Arsenal. They played their first competitive match in the division that September against Woolwich Arsenal, with a score of 2–2.

Turnstile numbers were still low, and the club published a statement stating, "The Newcastle public do not deserve to be catered for as far as professional football is concerned". However, eventually figures picked up by 1895–96, when 14,000 fans watched the team play Bury. That season Frank Watt became secretary of the club, and he was instrumental in promotion to the First Division for the 1898–99 season. However, they lost their first game 4–2 at home to Wolverhampton Wanderers and finished their first season in 13th place.

=== 1903–1937: First glory years and war years ===
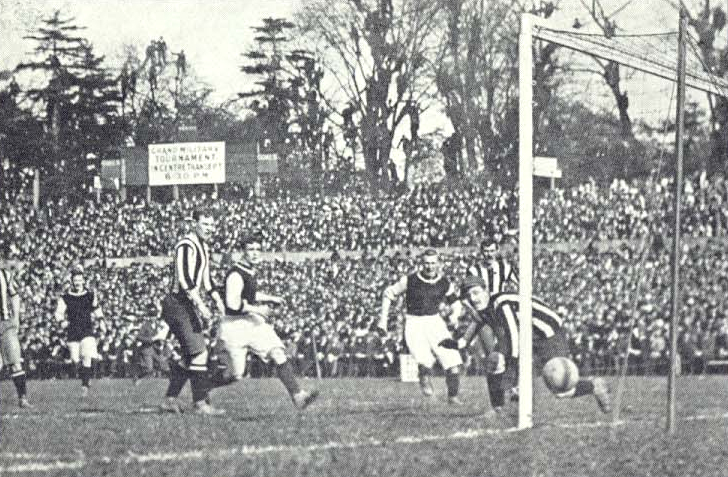
Harry Hampton of Aston Villa scores one of his two goals in the 1905 FA Cup final.

In 1903–04, the club built up a promising squad of players, and went on to dominate English football for almost a decade, the team known for their "artistic play, combining team-work and quick, short passing". Long after his retirement, Peter McWilliam, the team's defender at the time, said, "The Newcastle team of the 1900s would give any modern side a two-goal start and beat them, and furthermore, beat them at a trot". Newcastle United went on to win the League on three occasions during the 1900s; 1904–05, 1906–07 and 1908–09. In 1904–05, they nearly did the double, losing to Aston Villa in the 1905 FA Cup Final. They were beaten again the following year by Everton in the 1906 FA Cup Final. They reached the final again in 1908 where they lost to Wolverhampton Wanderers. They finally won the FA Cup in 1910 when they beat Barnsley in the final. They lost again the following year in the final against Bradford City.

The team returned to the FA Cup final in 1924, in the second final held at the then new Wembley Stadium. They beat Aston Villa, winning the club's second FA Cup. Three years later, they won the First Division championship a fourth time in 1926–27, with Hughie Gallacher, one of the most prolific goal scorers in the club's history, captaining the team. Other key players in this period were Neil Harris, Stan Seymour and Frank Hudspeth. In 1930, Newcastle United came close to relegation, and at the end of the season Gallacher left the club for Chelsea, and at the same time Andy Cunningham became the club's first team manager. In 1931–32, the club won the FA Cup a third time. However, a couple of years later, at the end of the 1933–34 season, the team were relegated to the Second Division after 35 seasons in the top. Cunningham left as manager and Tom Mather took over.

=== 1937–1969: Post-war success ===
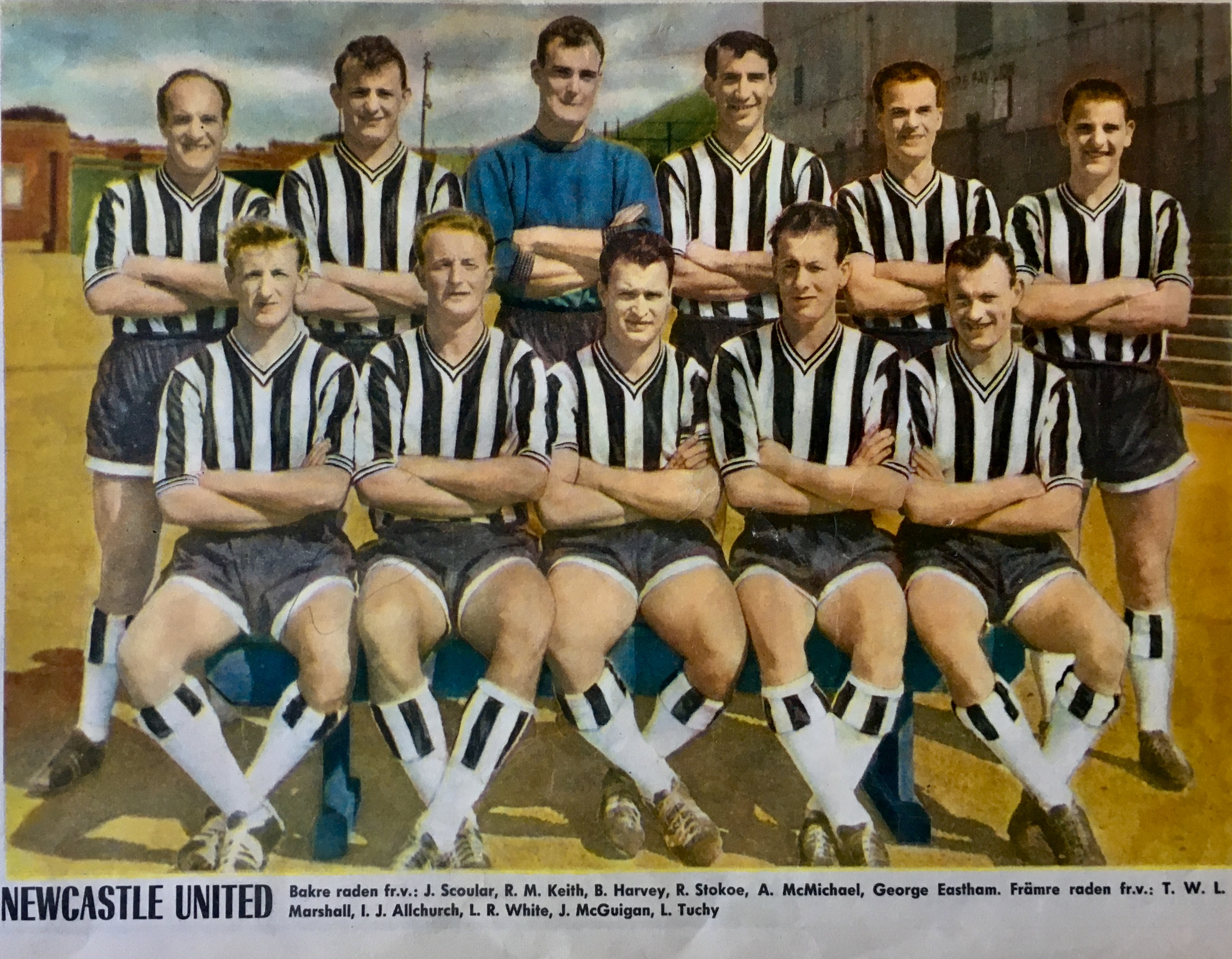
Newcastle United in 1960. L-r, standing: Jimmy Scoular, Dick Keith, Bryan Harvey (goalkeeper), Bob Stokoe, Alf McMichael and George Eastham; front: Terry Marshall, Ivor Allchurch, Len White, John McGuigan and Liam Tuohy.

The club found it difficult to adjust to the Second Division and were nearly further relegated in the 1937–38 season, when they were spared on goal average. However, when World War II broke out in 1939, Newcastle had a chance to regroup, and in the War period, they brought in Jackie Milburn, Tommy Walker and Bobby Cowell. They were finally promoted back to the First Division at the end of the 1947–48 season. During the 1950s, Newcastle won the FA Cup three times in five years, beating Blackpool in 1951, Arsenal in 1952 and Manchester City in 1955. However, after this last FA Cup victory the club fell back into decline and were relegated to the Second Division once again at the end of the 1960–61 season under the management of Charlie Mitten. Mitten left after one season in the Second Division and was replaced by former player Joe Harvey. Newcastle returned to the First Division at the end of the 1964–65 season after winning the Second Division title. Under Harvey, the club qualified for European competition for the first time after a good run in the 1967–68 season and the following year won the 1969 Inter-Cities Fairs Cup Final, triumphing 6–2 over two legs against Hungary's Újpest in the final.

=== 1969–1992: Bouncing between divisions ===
Harvey bought striker Malcolm Macdonald in the summer of 1971, for a club record transfer fee of £180,000 (equivalent to £2,265,000 in 2021). He was an impressive goal scorer, who led United's attack to Wembley in their 1974 FA Cup Final defeat at the hands of Liverpool. The club also had back to back triumphs in the Texaco Cup in 1974 and 1975. Harvey left the club in 1975, with Gordon Lee brought in to replace him. Lee took the team to the 1976 Football League Cup Final against Manchester City, but failed to bring the trophy back to Tyneside. However, he sold Macdonald to Arsenal at the end of the season, a decision of which Macdonald later said "I loved Newcastle, until Gordon Lee took over". Lee left for Everton in 1977, and was replaced by Richard Dinnis.

United dropped once again to the Second Division at the end of the 1977–78 season. Dinnis was replaced by Bill McGarry, and then he was replaced by Arthur Cox. Cox steered Newcastle back to the First Division at the end of the 1983–84 season, with players such as Peter Beardsley, Chris Waddle and ex-England captain Kevin Keegan the fulcrum of the team. However, with a lack of funds, Cox left for Derby County and Keegan retired. With managers such as Jack Charlton and then Willie McFaul, Newcastle remained in the top-flight, until key players such as Waddle, Beardsley and Paul Gascoigne were sold, and the team was relegated once more in the 1988–89 season. McFaul left the managerial post, and was replaced by Jim Smith. Smith left at the start of the 1991–92 season and the board appointed Osvaldo Ardiles his replacement.

John Hall became the club's chairman in 1992, and replaced Ardiles with Keegan, who managed to save the team from relegation to the Third Division. Keegan was given more money for players, buying Rob Lee, Paul Bracewell and Barry Venison. The club won the First Division championship at the end of the 1992–93 season, earning promotion to the Premier League.

=== 1993–2007: Into the Premier League ===
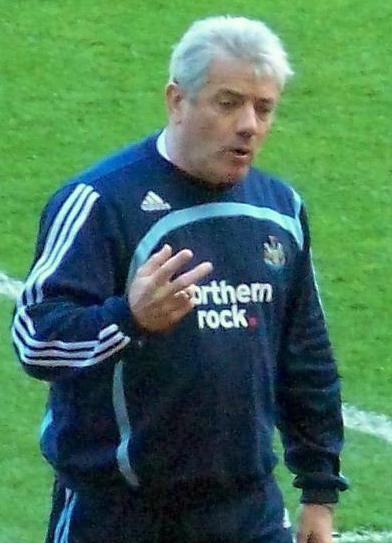
Kevin Keegan (pictured in his second spell in 2008) guided Newcastle to promotion and Champions League football from 1992 to 1997, turning United into one of the biggest clubs in England despite not winning the league.

At the end of their first year, 1993–94 season, back in the top flight they finished in third, their highest league finish since 1927. The attacking philosophy of Keegan led to the team being labelled "The Entertainers" by Sky Sports.

Keegan took Newcastle to two consecutive runners-up finishes in the league in 1995–96 and 1996–97, coming very close to winning the title in the former season which included a 4–3 game against Liverpool at Anfield – often considered the greatest game in Premier League history – which ended with a defining image of the Premier League with Keegan slumped over the advertising hoarding. The success of the team was in part due to the attacking talent of players like David Ginola, Les Ferdinand and Alan Shearer, who was signed on 30 July 1996 for a then world record fee of £15 million.

Keegan left Newcastle in January 1997 and was replaced by Kenny Dalglish, however the club endured a largely unsuccessful season with a 13th-place finish in the 1997–98 FA Premier League, failure to progress beyond the group stages of the 1997–98 UEFA Champions League despite beating Barcelona and group winners Dynamo Kyiv at home as well as coming from 2–0 down to draw 2–2 with Valeriy Lobanovskyi's team in Ukraine and defeat in the 1998 FA Cup Final. Dalglish was replaced as manager early in the following season by Ruud Gullit. The club once again finished 13th in the league and lost the 1999 FA Cup Final. Gullit fell into disagreements with the squad and chairman Freddy Shepherd, and quit the club five games into the 1999–2000 season with the team bottom of the table to be replaced by Bobby Robson. In 1999, Newcastle was the 5th-highest revenue producing club in the world; second in England behind Manchester United.

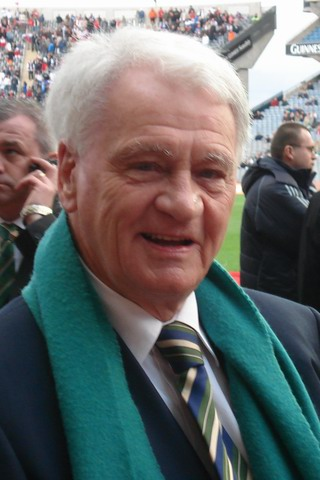
Bobby Robson managed the club for five years, departing in 2004.

A title challenge emerged during the 2001–02 season, and Newcastle's fourth-place finish saw them qualify for the UEFA Champions League. The following season, Robson guided the team to another title challenge and finished third in the League, and the second group stage of the Champions League, after being the first team to have progressed past the first group stage after losing their first three games. Newcastle finished fifth in the league at the end of the 2003–04 season, and exited the Champions League in the qualifying rounds; despite this, Robson was sacked in August 2004 following a series of disagreements with the club.

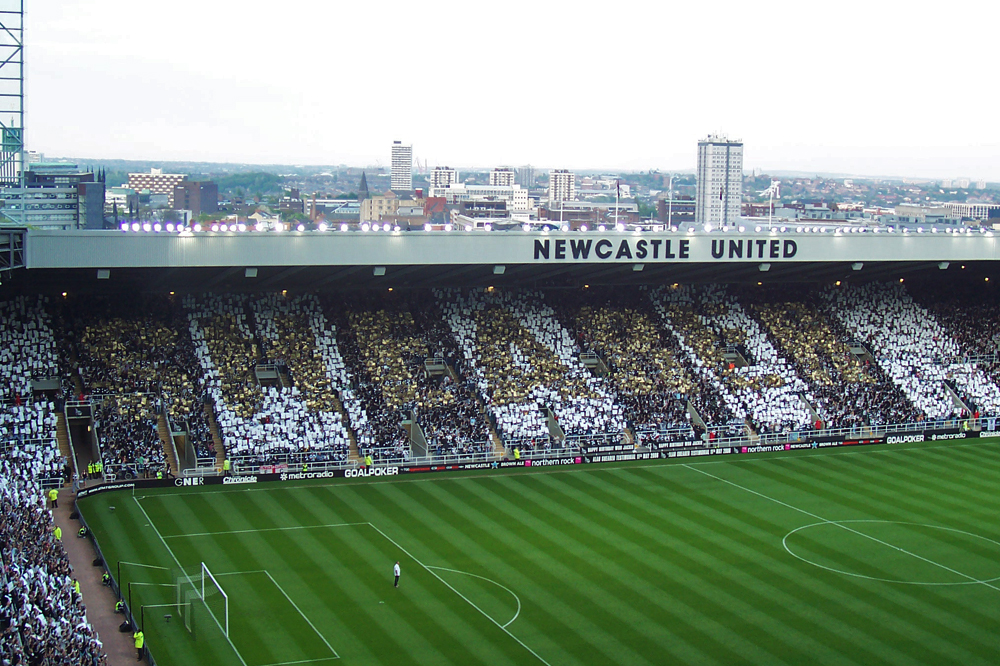
Alan Shearer mosaic during his testimonial match in May 2006. The club's record goalscorer retired that month.

Graeme Souness was brought in as manager early in the 2004–05 season. In his time at the helm, he broke the club's transfer record by signing Michael Owen for £16.8 million. Souness also took Newcastle to the quarter-finals of the 2004–05 UEFA Cup, with Alan Shearer winning the tournament's golden boot as well. However, he was sacked in February 2006 after a bad start to the club's 2005–06 season. Glenn Roeder took over, initially on a temporary basis, before being appointed full-time manager at the end of the season. Shearer retired at the end of the 2005–06 season as the club's all-time record goal scorer, with 206 goals.

In 2006, Newcastle won the Intertoto Cup for the first time in their history, and their first European trophy since 1973.

Despite finishing the 2005–06 season in seventh, Roeder's fortunes changed in the 2006–07 season, with a terrible injury run to the senior squad, and he left the club by mutual consent on 6 May 2007. After the 2006–07 season, and inside the Premier League era, Newcastle United were now the fifth most successful Premiership club in terms of points gained.

Sam Allardyce was appointed Roeder's replacement as manager on 15 May 2007.

=== 2007–2021: Mike Ashley era ===
On 7 June, Freddy Shepherd's final shares in the club were sold to Mike Ashley and Shepherd was replaced as chairman by Chris Mort on 25 July. Ashley then announced he would be delisting the club from the London Stock Exchange upon completion of the takeover. The club officially ceased trading on the Stock Exchange as of 8 am on 18 July 2007 at 5p a share.

Allardyce departed the club on in January 2008 by mutual consent after a bad start to the 2007–08 season, and Kevin Keegan was reappointed as Newcastle manager. Mort stepped down as chairman in June and was replaced by Derek Llambias, a long-term associate of Ashley. Newcastle finished the 2007–08 season in 12th place; but, as the season drew to a close, Keegan publicly criticised the board, stating that they were not providing the team with enough financial support.

In September 2008, Keegan resigned as manager, stating: "It's my opinion that a manager must have the right to manage and that clubs should not impose upon any manager any player that he does not want". Former Wimbledon manager Joe Kinnear was appointed as his replacement; in February 2009, due to his heart surgery, Alan Shearer was appointed as interim manager in his absence. Under Shearer, the club were relegated to the Championship at the end of the 2008–09 season, the first time the club had left the Premier League since joining it in 1993.

Following their relegation, the club was put up for sale in June 2009, with an asking price of £100 million. Chris Hughton was given the manager's job on a caretaker basis, before taking over full-time on 27 October 2009. On the same day, Ashley announced that the club was no longer for sale.

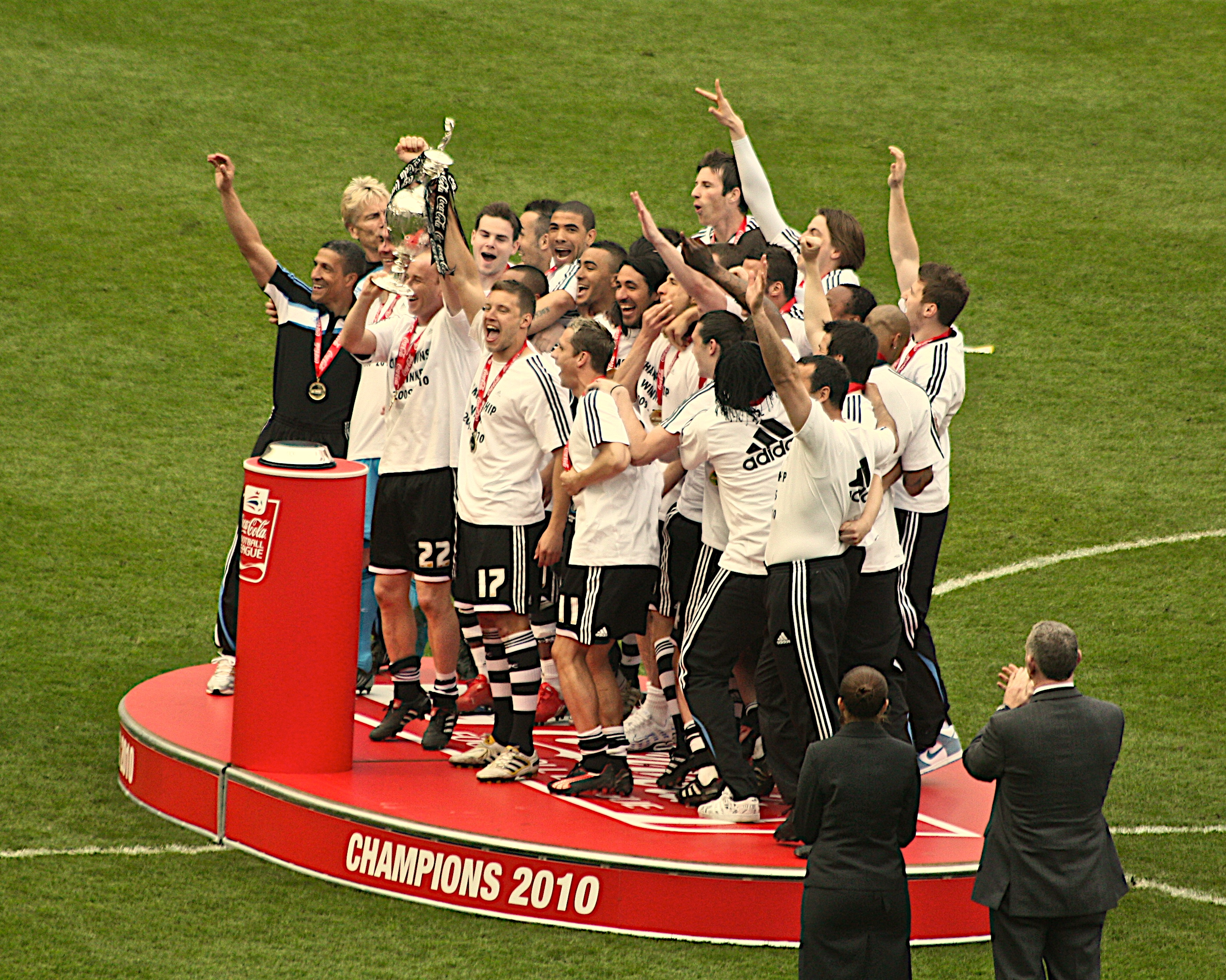
Newcastle made an immediate return to the top-flight in 2010 after their relegation the year prior.

Hughton led Newcastle to win the 2009–10 Championship, securing automatic promotion on 5 April 2010 with five games remaining, and securing the title on 19 April; Newcastle were promoted back to the Premier League after just one season away.

Under Hughton, Newcastle enjoyed a strong start to the 2010–11 season, but he was sacked on 6 December 2010. The club's board stated that they felt that "an individual with more managerial experience [was] needed to take the club forward." Three days later, Alan Pardew was appointed as manager with a five-and-a-half-year contract. Despite some turbulence, Newcastle were able to finish 12th at the end of the season, with one particular highlight being a 4–4 home draw against Arsenal that saw Newcastle come back from four goals down to claim a point.

The start of the 2011–12 season was very successful, as they went on to enjoy one of their strongest openings to a season, playing 11 consecutive games unbeaten. Newcastle eventually secured a place in the 2012–13 Europa League with a fifth-place finish, their highest league position since the Bobby Robson days. Further honours were to come as Pardew won both the Premier League Manager of the Season and the LMA Manager of the Year awards.

The following season, Newcastle made few acquisitions in the summer and suffered several injuries over the season. As a result, the first half of the season was marred by a run of 10 losses in 13 games, which saw the club sink near the relegation zone. The Europa League campaign was largely successful, with the team making the quarter-finals, before bowing out to eventual finalists Benfica. Domestically, Newcastle struggled, and stayed up after a 2–1 victory over already-relegated Queens Park Rangers in the penultimate game of the season.

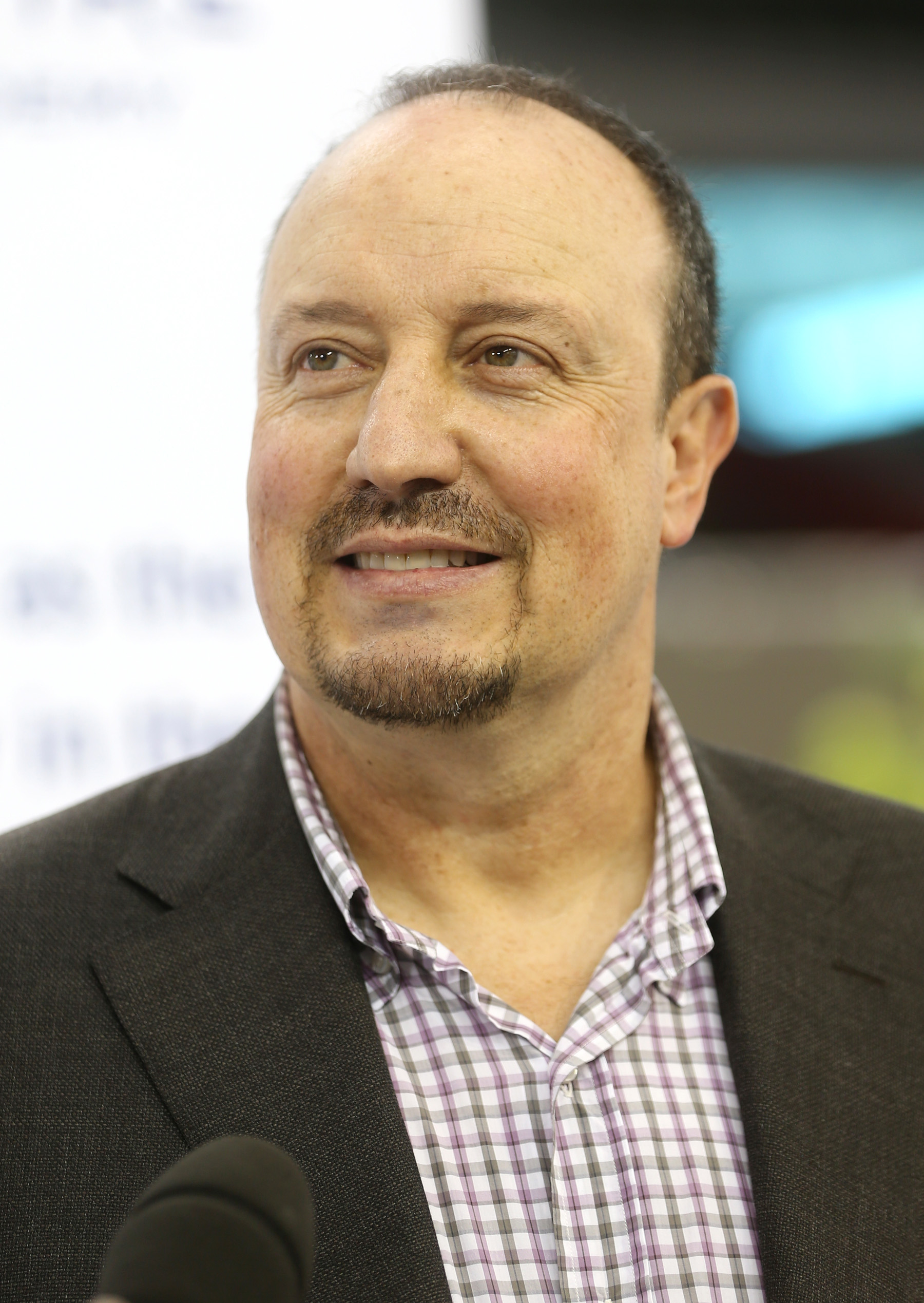
Rafael Benítez managed the club from 2016 to 2019.

The 2014–15 season saw Newcastle fail to win any of their first seven games, prompting fans to start a campaign to get Pardew sacked as manager, before an upturn in form saw them climb to fifth in the table. Pardew left for Crystal Palace in December. On 26 January 2015, his assistant John Carver was put in charge for the remainder of the season, but came close to relegation, staying up on the final day with a 2–0 home win against West Ham; Jonás Gutiérrez, who beat testicular cancer earlier in the season, scored the team's second goal.

On 9 June 2015, Carver was sacked and replaced by Steve McClaren the following day. On 11 March 2016, McClaren was sacked after nine months as manager, with Newcastle in 19th place in the Premier League and having won just six of 28 Premier League games during his time at the club. He was replaced by Spaniard Rafael Benítez on the same day, who signed a three-year deal, but was not able to prevent the club from being relegated for the second time under Ashley's ownership.

Newcastle returned to the Premier League at the first attempt, winning the Championship title in May 2017. In October, Mike Ashley put Newcastle United up for sale for a second time. The team finished the season with a 3–0 win over the previous year's champions Chelsea, finishing tenth in the league, their highest finish in four years. The following season saw a 13th-place finish, despite being in the relegation zone in January. Ashley came under increased scrutiny for his lack of investment in the squad and apparent focus on other business ventures. Benitez left his position on 30 June 2019 after rejecting a new contract.

On 17 July 2019, former Sunderland manager Steve Bruce was appointed as his replacement on a three-year contract. Bruce oversaw 13th and 12th-placed finishes during his two full seasons in charge.

=== 2021–present: PIF era ===
On 7 October 2021, after 14 years as owner, Ashley sold the club to a new consortium for a reported £305 million. The consortium was made up of Saudi Arabia's Public Investment Fund, RB Sports & Media and PCP Capital Partners. On 20 October, Bruce left his position by mutual consent, after receiving a reported £8 million payout. Eddie Howe was appointed as Bruce's replacement on 8 November 2021. Howe guided the club to an 11th-place finish after a run of 12 wins in their final 18 games, and Newcastle became the first team in Premier League history to avoid relegation after failing to win any of their first 14 games.

On 21 August 2022, Newcastle United Women moved into the club's ownership for the first time, after a formal restructuring. At the end of the 2022–23 season, the club sealed qualification for the Champions League for the first time in 20 years. The season was the subject of the Amazon Prime Video documentary We Are Newcastle United. In the 2023–24 season, Newcastle were eliminated in the group stages of the Champions League.

On 16 March 2025, Newcastle United won their first major domestic trophy since 1955 after beating Liverpool 2–1 in the 2025 EFL Cup final through goals from Dan Burn and Alexander Isak. The club finished fifth and qualified for the Champions League. However, Newcastle finished 12th in the succeeding Premier League season and exited the Champions League in the Round of 16 to Barcelona 8–3. Following the disappointing 2025–26 season, manager Eddie Howe stepped down in July 2026 and was replaced by Matthias Jaissle in August.

== Club identity ==
Newcastle United's original colours, worn until 1894

The club's home colours are a black and white striped shirt. Shorts and socks are usually black with white trim, though white socks are sometimes worn. Newcastle's colours at the outset were generally the home kit of Newcastle East End, comprising plain red shirts with white shorts and red socks. In 1894, the club adopted the black and white striped shirts, which had been used as the reserve team's colours. These colours were chosen for the senior team because they were not associated with either of the two teams United were merged from. They played in grey shorts until 1897, and between 1897 and 1921, they played in blue shorts before adopting the black shorts they play in now.

United's away colours have changed a number of times over the years. They played in white shirts and black shorts from 1914 until 1961, and then white shorts until 1966. They then played in yellow shirts and blue shorts for the 1967–68 season, but from 1969 to 1974 played in all red with an all blue third kit. In 1974, they returned to a yellow shirt, which they played with various coloured shorts until 1983. They played in all grey from 1983 to 1988, before once again returning to the yellow kit until 1993. Since 1995, the away kit has changed frequently and has not been the same for more than a single season.

Newcastle United crest: 1983–1988

The current club crest was first used in the 1988–89 season. The crest includes elements from the coat of arms of the city of Newcastle upon Tyne – the two sea horses representing Tyneside's strong connections with the sea, the castle representing the city's keep. The city's coat of arms were first embroidered on the team's shirts in 1969 and worn as standard until 1976. A scroll at the bottom featured the city's motto in Latin; fortiter defendit triumphans which translates into English as "triumphing by brave defence". From 1976 until 1983, the club wore a specific badge which was developed to wear in place of the city's coat of arms. The design was of a circular shape, which featured the club's name in full, it contained a magpie standing in front of the River Tyne with the historic keep of Newcastle in the background. A more simplistic design followed in 1983, featuring the initials of the club's name, NUFC with the small magpie used in the previous crest within the horizontally laid "C"; this logo was relatively short lived and was discontinued after 1988.

=== Kit suppliers and shirt sponsors ===
In May 2013, Newcastle announced a sponsorship which featured the Wonga.com logo on kits. This attracted criticism from many Newcastle supporters. In July 2013, it was reported that Newcastle striker and practising Muslim Papiss Cissé refused to wear any official kit or training wear with reference to Wonga.com as it did not align with his religious beliefs. The matter was later resolved.

On 15 May 2017, the home shirt for the 2017–18 season was revealed, featuring the logo of new sponsors Fun88. The shirt was shown to include a gold and silver commemorative crest to mark the club's 125th football season, based on the city's coat of arms. It was also announced that the kit would feature red numbers for the first time since the 1992–93 season.

Newcastle United's current kit sponsor is Knox Hydrate, a deal that started in 2026. Previous kit sponsors include Newcastle Breweries (1980–1986), Greenall's Beers (1986–1990), McEwan's Lager and Newcastle Brown Ale (1990–2000), NTL (2000–2003), Northern Rock (2003–2012), Virgin Money (2012–2013), Wonga.com (2013–2017), Fun88 (2017–2023), and Sela (2023-2026).

Newcastle United's current kit manufacturer is Adidas, in a deal that started in 2024. Previous kit manufacturers include Bukta (1974–1975, 1976–1980), Umbro (1975–1976, 1980–1993), Asics (1993–1995), Adidas (1995–2010, 2024–present), Puma (2010–2021), and Castore (2021–2024).

Newcastle United's current sleeve sponsor is Noon, in a deal that started in 2022. Previous sleeve sponsors include MRF Tyres (2017–2018), StormGain (2019–2020), ICM.com (2020–2021), and Kayak (2021–2022).

Other current team sponsors include Fun88, BetMGM, Carling, Monster Energy, Sportsbet.io, InPost, Fenwick and Saudia.

Period	Kit manufacturer	Shirt sponsor (front)	Shirt sponsor (sleeve)	Shirt sponsor (back)
1974–1975	Bukta	No sponsor	No sponsor	No sponsor
1975–1976	Umbro	No sponsor	No sponsor	No sponsor
1976–1980	Bukta	No sponsor	No sponsor	No sponsor
1980–1986	Umbro	Newcastle Breweries	No sponsor	No sponsor
1986–1990	Umbro	Greenall's Beers	No sponsor	No sponsor
1990–1993	Umbro	Newcastle Brown Ale / McEwan's Lager	No sponsor	No sponsor
1993–1995	Asics	Newcastle Brown Ale / McEwan's Lager	No sponsor	No sponsor
1995–1996	Adidas	Newcastle Brown Ale / McEwan's Lager	No sponsor	No sponsor
1996–2000	Adidas	Newcastle Brown Ale	No sponsor	No sponsor
2000–2003	Adidas	NTL	No sponsor	No sponsor
2003–2010	Adidas	Northern Rock	No sponsor	No sponsor
2010–2012	Puma	Northern Rock	No sponsor	No sponsor
2012–2013	Puma	Virgin Money	No sponsor	No sponsor
2013–2017	Puma	Wonga	No sponsor	No sponsor
2017–2018	Puma	Fun88	MRF Tyres	No sponsor
2018–2019	Puma	Fun88	No sponsor	No sponsor
2019–2020	Puma	Fun88	StormGain	No sponsor
2020–2021	Puma	Fun88	ICM.com	No sponsor
2021–2022	Castore	Fun88	Kayak	No sponsor
2022–2023	Castore	Fun88	Noon	No sponsor
2023–2024	Castore	Sela	Noon	No sponsor
2024–2025	Adidas	Sela	Noon	Sam Fender (People Watching)
2025–2026	Adidas	Sela	Noon	No sponsor
2026–	Adidas	Knox Hydrate	Noon	No sponsor

== Stadium ==
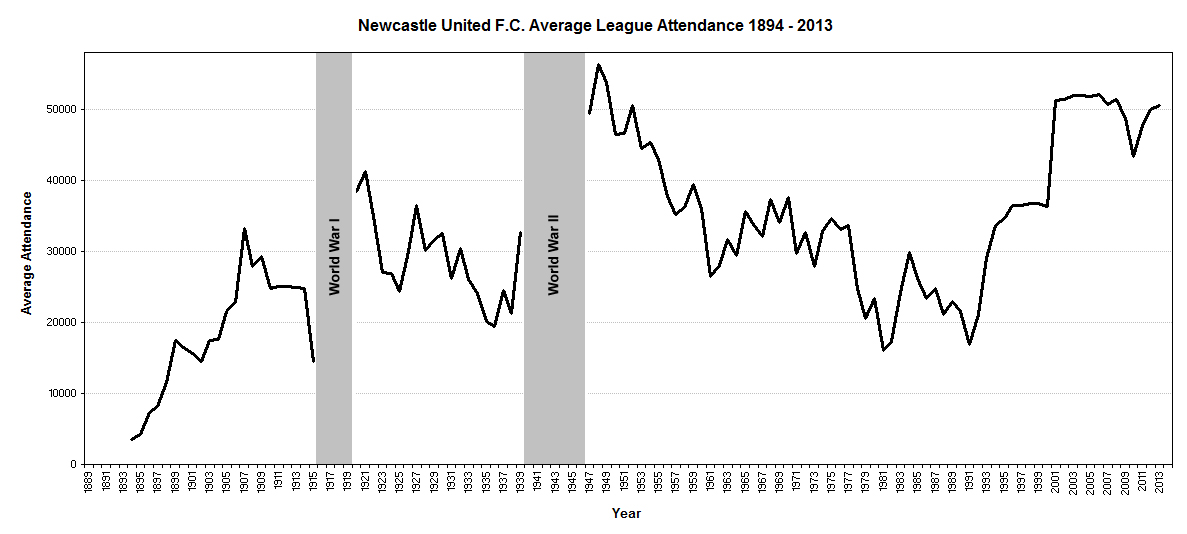
Newcastle finished as the Football League's best supported club on ten occasions. The club was the first in the world to attract over one million for league games (1946–47) and average over 50,000 for league games (1947–48; 56,283).

Throughout Newcastle United's history, their home venue has been St. James' Park, the oldest and largest football stadium in North East England, as well as the seventh-largest football stadium in the Premier League. It has hosted 11 international football matches at senior level, the first in 1901 and the most recent in 2024. It was used as a venue for both the 2012 Summer Olympics and the 2015 Rugby World Cup and has been a regular venue for Rugby League's Magic Weekend, attracting record crowds.

Football had been played at St. James' Park as early as 1880, the ground being occupied by Newcastle Rangers, before becoming the home of Newcastle West End in 1886. Its lease was then bought by Newcastle East End in 1892, before they changed their name to Newcastle United. At the turn of the 20th century, the ground's capacity was given as 30,000 before being redeveloped between 1900 and 1905, increasing the capacity to 60,000 and making it the biggest stadium in England for a time. For most of the 20th century, the stadium changed very little, despite various plans for development of the ground. The old West Stand was replaced with the Milburn Stand in 1987, the Sir John Hall Stand replacing the Leazes End in 1993, and the rest of the ground renovated making the ground a 37,000 capacity all-seater stadium. Between 1998 and 2000, double tiers were added to the Milburn and Sir John Hall stands to bring the venue up to its current capacity of 52,305.

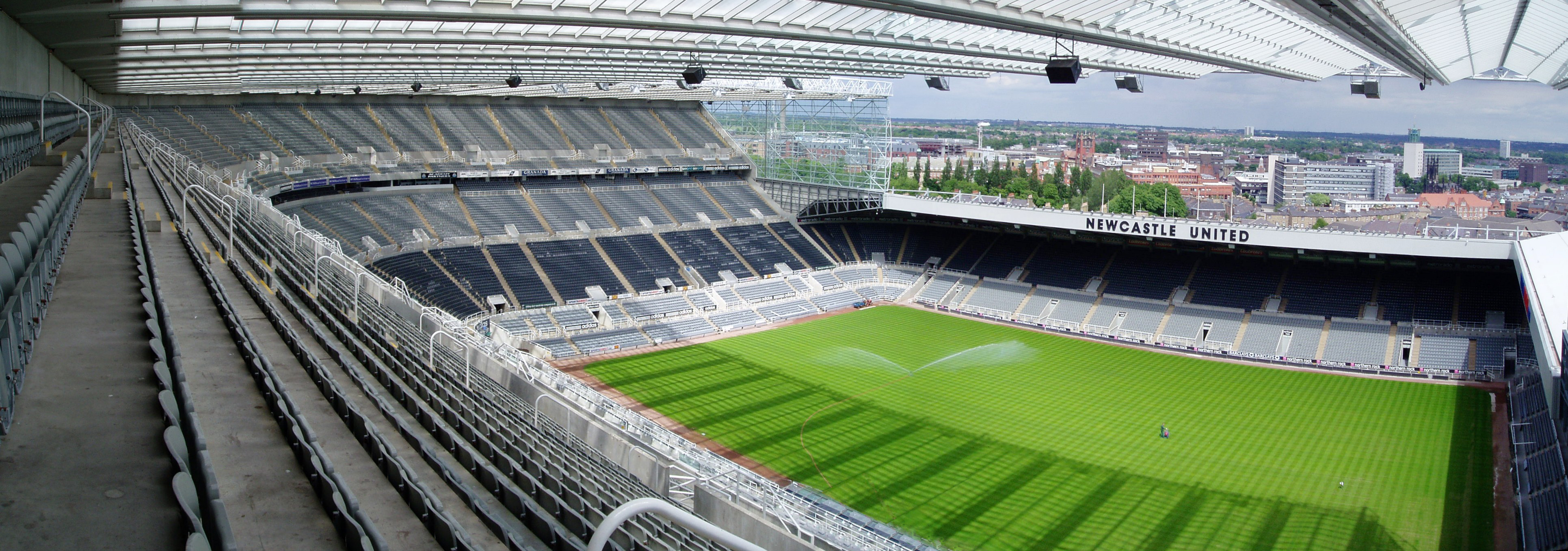
A panorama of St James' Park from the Milburn Stand, showing from left to right the Sir John Hall Stand, the East Stand and the Gallowgate End

In October 2009, Ashley announced that he planned to lease the name of the ground in a bid to increase revenue, and in November the stadium was temporarily renamed sportsdirect.com @ St. James' Park Stadium. This name was only supposed to be used until the end of the 2009–10 season, but lasted until November 2011. On 10 November 2011, the club officially changed the name of the stadium to the Sports Direct Arena, although this was an interim name to showcase the sponsorship capabilities of the stadium. The company, owned by Ashley, was not paying anything for the deal. In October 2012, payday loan company Wonga became Newcastle United's main commercial sponsor and purchased the stadium naming rights, but restored the St. James' Park name.

Following the conclusion of the 22/23 season, a small allocation of seating in between the East stand and Gallowgate end were converted into Safe standing zones meaning that, for the first time since 1993, St. James' Park is no longer an all-seater stadium like many other Premier League grounds.

In July 2023, it was confirmed that following the re-purchase of Strawberry Place, plans for a new fan zone outside the Gallowgate End had been submitted. It will be built in partnership with Stack and Sela (the club's front of shirt sponsor).

Since 1982, the stadium has been served by the St James Metro station on the Tyne and Wear Metro. The station is decorated in a black and white colour scheme, with archive photographs of the club's players.

The club's current training ground is the Newcastle United Training Centre, located at Darsley Park, which is north of the city in Benton. The team began training at the facility in July 2003.

Following the club's ownership takeover in 2021, the Training Centre was renovated extensively, with a new reception area, restaurant, players' lounge, presentation suite, offices, medical facility, dressing room and hydrotherapy unit being constructed.

== Ownership ==
Newcastle United was set up as a private company limited by shares on 6 September 1895. The club traded in this way for much of the 20th century, dominated by McKeag, Westwood and Seymour family ownership.

John Hall, who bought 79.2% of the club for £3 million in 1991, floated the club on the stock exchange as a public limited company in April 1997. After the float 57% of the shares were held by John Hall and his family, and a minority were held by his business partner Freddy Shepherd.

In December 1998, after buying a 6.3% stake in the club for £10 million, the media group NTL had considered a full takeover of the club. This was later dropped after the Competition Commission, established in April 1999, expressed concerns about football clubs being owned by media companies.

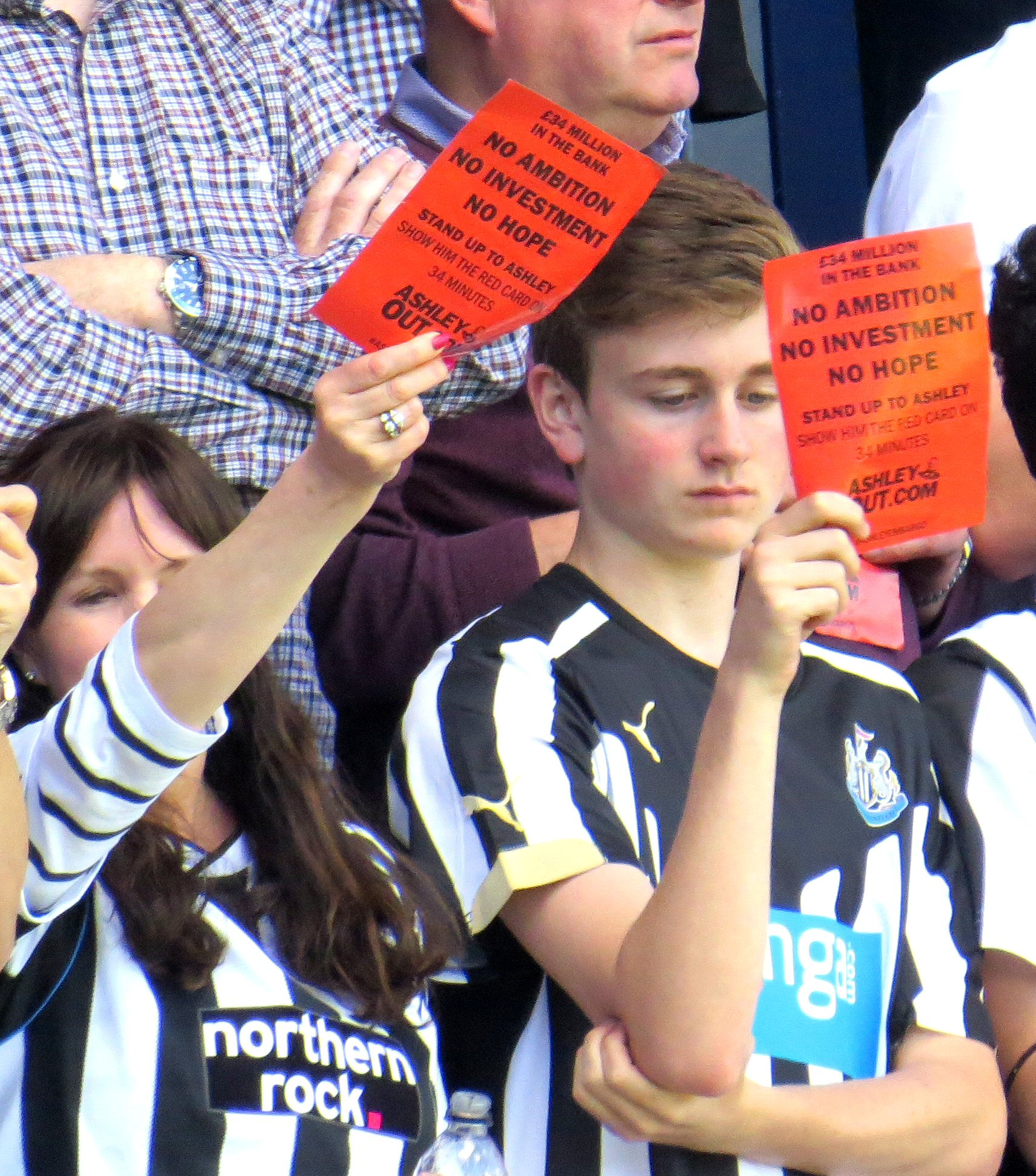
Newcastle fans show "Mike Ashley Out" cards away to QPR, May 2015.

In 2007, businessman Mike Ashley purchased the combined stakes of both Douglas and John Hall, 41% share in the club, through a holding company St James Holdings, with a view to buy the rest. Upon purchasing this share, he appointed Chris Mort as chairman, while gaining more shares, owning 93.19% of the club by 29 June 2007. This figure reached 95% on 11 July 2007, forcing the remaining shareholders to sell their shares.

After completing the purchase of the club, Ashley had announced that he planned to sell the club on three occasions. The first occurred after fan protests over the resignation of Kevin Keegan in September 2008, when Ashley stated, "I have listened to you. You want me out. That is what I am now trying to do." However, he took it off the market on 28 December 2008 after being unable to find a buyer. On 31 May 2009, it was reported that Ashley was attempting to sell the club again. On 8 June 2009, Ashley confirmed that the club was up for sale at an asking price of £100 million. By the end of August 2009, the club was back off the market. On 16 October 2017, Newcastle United announced that Ashley had once again put the club up for sale, reporting that he hoped that a deal could be concluded by Christmas 2017.

=== Saudi-led takeover ===
In April 2020, it was widely reported that a consortium consisting of Public Investment Fund, PCP Capital Partners and RB Sports & Media, was finalising an offer to acquire Newcastle United. The proposed sale prompted concerns and criticism, such as arguments considering it sportwashing of Saudi Arabia's human rights record, as well as ongoing piracy of sports broadcasts in the region.

In May 2020, two Conservative MPs called upon the government to scrutinise aspects of the deal, with Karl McCartney calling for the sale to be blocked, and Giles Watling calling upon the Department for Digital, Culture, Media and Sport (DCMS) to hold an oral evidence session regarding sports piracy in Saudi Arabia. In May 2020, The Guardian reported that the Premier League had obtained a report from the World Trade Organization (published publicly the following month), which contained evidence that Saudi nationals had backed beoutQ – a pirate broadcaster carrying the beIN Sports networks in the region since the Qatar diplomatic crisis. In June 2020, The Guardian reported that Richard Masters, who appeared in front of the DCMS, had hinted the possible takeover of Newcastle United was close to completion. The MPs warned it would be humiliating to allow a Saudi Arabian consortium to take charge given the country's record on piracy and human rights.

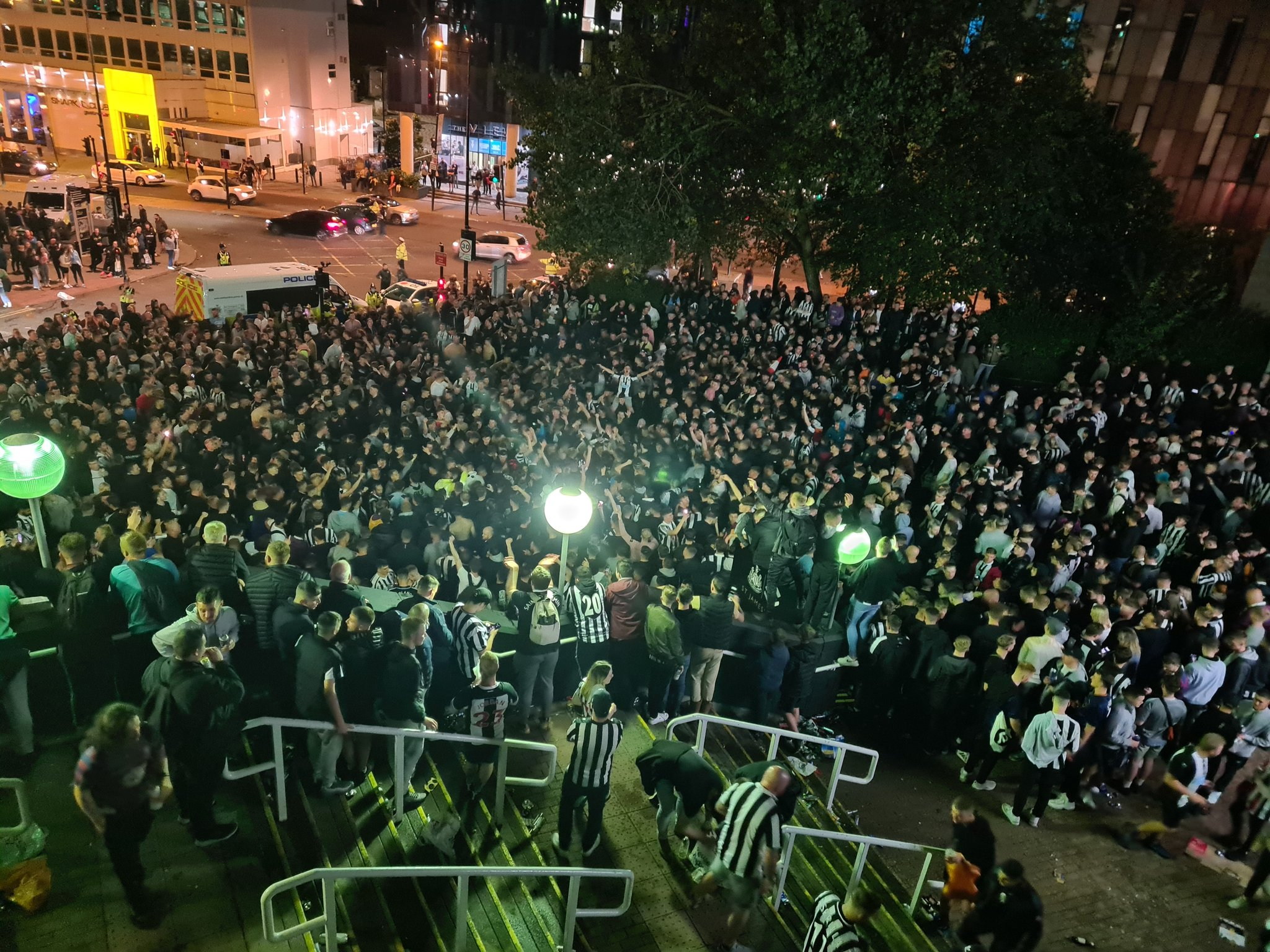
Image from 100% MAGS, showing thousands of Newcastle fans celebrating the completed takeover outside St. James' Park on 7 October 2021

In July 2020, The Guardian reported that Saudi Arabia's decision to ban beIN Sports broadcast from operating in the nation had further complicated the takeover of Newcastle United. On 30 July 2020, Saudi Arabia announced its withdrawal from the Newcastle deal, stating "with a deep appreciation for the Newcastle community and the significance of its football club, we have come to the decision to withdraw our interest in acquiring Newcastle United Football Club". The group also stated that the "prolonged process" was a major factor in them pulling out. The collapse of the takeover was met with widespread criticism from Newcastle fans, with Newcastle MP Chi Onwurah accusing the Premier League of treating fans of the club with "contempt" and subsequently wrote to Masters for an explanation.

Despite the consortium's withdrawal, disputes over the takeover continued. On 9 September 2020, Newcastle United released a statement claiming that the Premier League had officially rejected the takeover by the consortium and accused Masters and the Premier League board of "[not] acting appropriately in relation to [the takeover]", while stating that the club would be considering any relevant legal action. The Premier League strongly denied this in a statement released the next day, expressing "surprise" and "disappointment" at Newcastle's statement.

On 7 October 2021, the Public Investment Fund, PCP Capital Partners and RB Sports & Media confirmed that they had officially completed the acquisition of Newcastle United. An investigation in May 2022 by The Guardian claimed that the British government of Boris Johnson was involved in Saudi Arabia's takeover of Newcastle United. In April 2021, it was revealed that Saudi Crown Prince Mohammed bin Salman had warned Johnson in a text message, stating that the Premier League's decision would impact on UK-Saudi diplomatic relations. Following the warning, Johnson had appointed his special envoy for the Gulf, Edward Lister, to take up the case. It was later reported that Johnson's extensive efforts also involved the Minister of Investment Gerry Grimstone, who held discussions with the Premier League chairman Gary Hoffman and Saudi representatives well-connected with MBS' office. The UK Government and Johnson said they were not involved in the Saudi takeover. After Premier League's approval, Hoffman informed the 20 English football clubs that there was extensive pressure from the government; he said the decision was not influenced by it. A separate report revealed that, despite the US' conclusion that Jamal Khashoggi's assassination was ordered by Saudi's Prince Mohammed, he was able to avert the owners' and directors' test of the Premier League. Human Rights Watch (HRW), a campaign group, has accused the Saudi government of using football, motor racing and golf for sportswashing. As reported by Josh Noble, a sports editor for the Financial Times, HRW defines sportswashing as "an effort to distract from its serious human rights abuses by taking over events that celebrate human achievement".

Development of revenue (without transfers)
Season	Revenue	World rank
2020–21	€170.1m	29▲
2021–22	€212.3m	20▲
2022–23	€287.8m	17▲
2023–24	€371.8m	15▲
2024–25	€398.4m	17▼

The Premier League had agreed to the Saudi PIF takeover of Newcastle, following "legally-binding assurances" that the Saudi state will have no control over the club. However, in February 2023, court documents published in the US claimed that the PIF is "a sovereign instrumentality of the Kingdom of Saudi Arabia", and that the PIF governor and Newcastle's chairman Yasir Al-Rumayyan is "a sitting minister of the Saudi government". Following that, Amnesty international, which already criticised Saudi of sportswashing, pushed Premier League to re-examine the Saudi PIF takeover of the club. In March 2023, Richard Masters expressed his doubts to a committee of lawmakers, stating that he was unsure if Premier League had launched the investigation. In October 2024, the Premier League said it will not review the Saudi deal.

== Social responsibility ==
Newcastle United Foundation is an independent charity established by the club in summer 2008. It seeks to encourage learning and promote healthy living amongst disadvantaged children, young people and families in the North East region, as well as promoting equality and diversity.

In December 2012, the club announced that it had become the world's first carbon positive football club.

== Supporters and rivalries ==
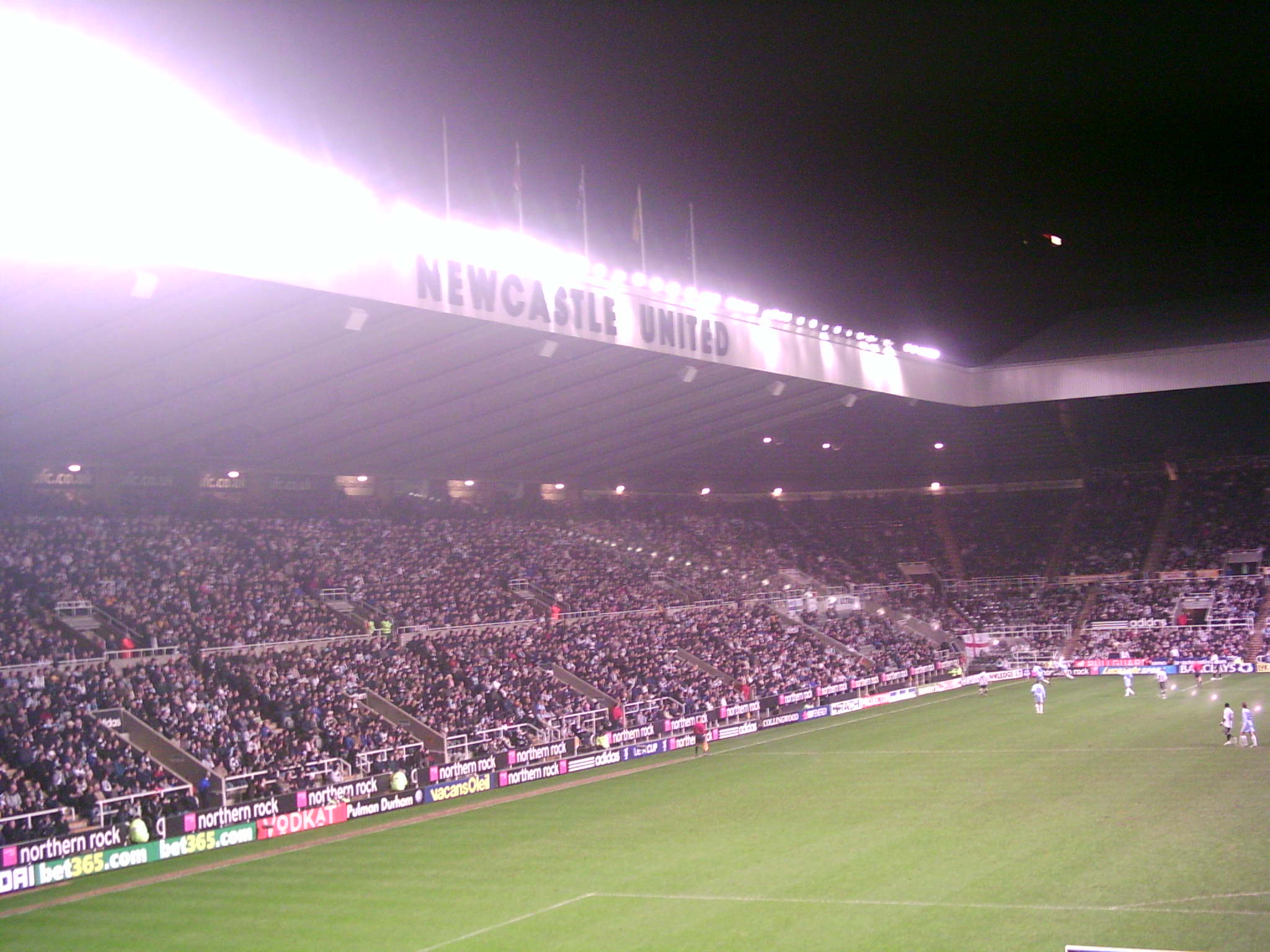
Supporters at St. James' Park

Newcastle United's supporters are known for being some of the most passionate football fans in the world. In 2016, supporters founded the Wor Flags group, which continues to produce large and unique flag, banner and tifo displays at St. James' Park. The group is entirely fan-funded.

The club's strongest supporter base is in the North East, but supporters' clubs can be found in many countries across the world. The club's nickname is The Magpies, while the club's supporters are also known as the "Geordies" or the "Toon Army". The name "Toon" originates from the Geordie pronunciation of town. In a 2004 survey by Co-operative Financial Services, it was found that Newcastle United topped the league table for the cost incurred and distance travelled by Newcastle-based fans wishing to travel to every Premier League away game. The total distance travelled for a fan to attend every away game from Newcastle was found to be equivalent to a round-the-world trip. In the 2016–17 season, while in the second tier, Newcastle recorded an average attendance of 51,106.

The club's supporters publish a number of fanzines including True Faith and The Mag, along with NUFC.com, which was established in 1996. They set up Newcastle United Supporters Trust in September 2008, aiming to "represent the broad church of Newcastle United's support". In addition to the usual English football chants, Newcastle's supporters sing the traditional Tyneside song "Blaydon Races". Prior to each home game the team enters the field to "Going Home", the closing song of the 1983 film Local Hero, written by Newcastle supporter and Dire Straits founder Mark Knopfler.

In 1998, The Police founder and Newcastle fan Sting wrote a song in support of Newcastle, called "Black and White Army (Bringing The Pride Back Home)" (sung by Ryan Molloy). In 2015, some Newcastle fans boycotted games in protest of club management by Mike Ashley, and they were supported by famous club fans like Sting and Jimmy Nail.

Traditionally, Newcastle's main rivals are Sunderland, against whom the Tyne–Wear derby is competed, along with Middlesbrough, with whom they compete in the Tyne-Tees derby.

== Records ==
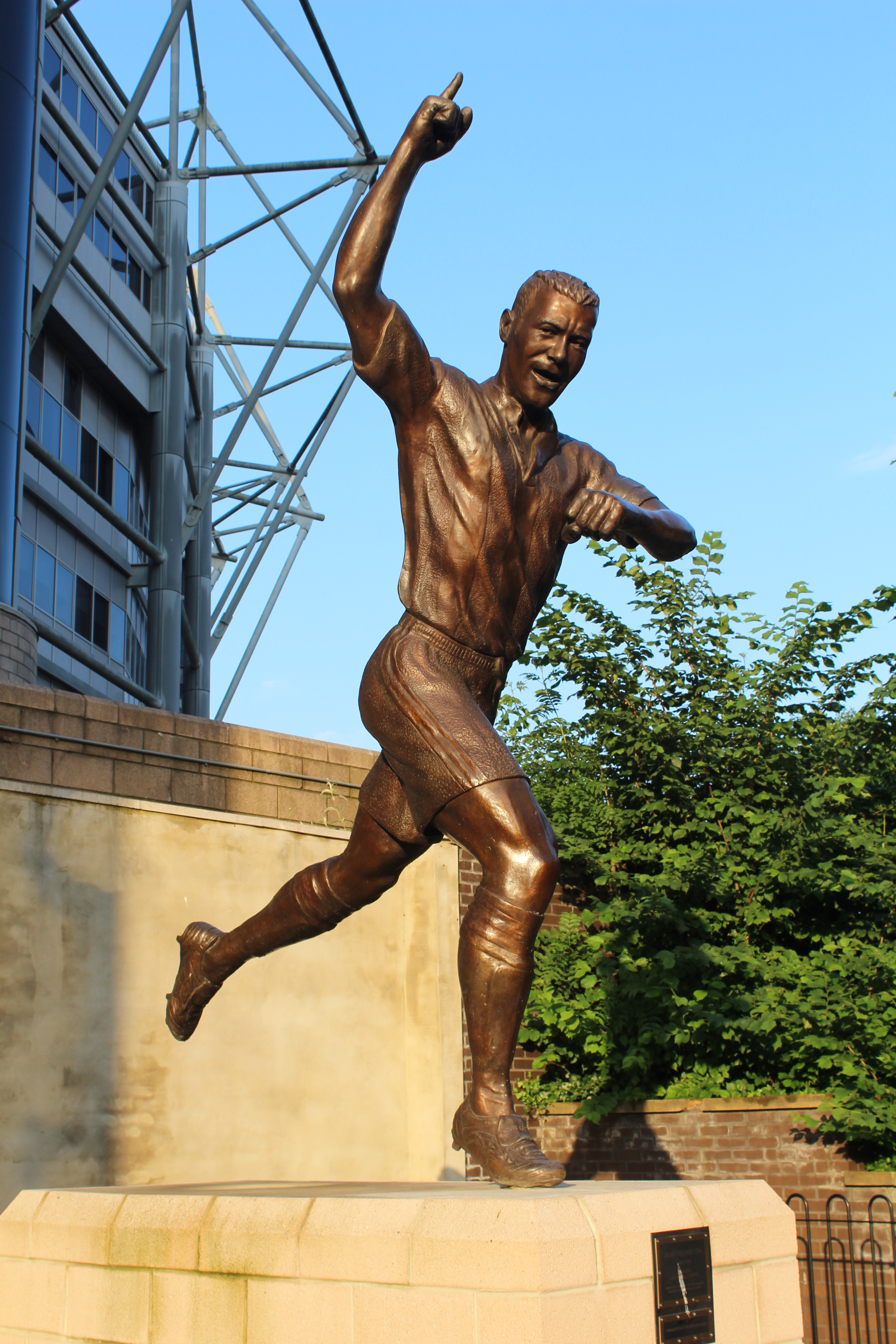
Alan Shearer statue outside St. James' Park

Newcastle United have spent ninety-four seasons in the top-flight, they are eighth in the all-time Premier League table and have the ninth-highest total of major honours won by an English club with eleven wins. Jimmy Lawrence holds the record for the most appearances for the club, having made 496 first team appearances between 1904 and 1921. Alan Shearer is the club's record goal scorer, scoring 206 goals in all competitions between 1996 and 2006. Andy Cole holds the record for the most goals scored in a season: 41 in the 1993–94 season in the Premier League. Shay Given is the most capped international for the club, with 134 appearances for the Republic of Ireland.

Newcastle United's widest victory margin in the league was a 13–0 win against Newport County in the Second Division in 1946. Their heaviest defeat in the league was 9–0 against Burton Wanderers in the Second Division in 1895.

Newcastle's record home attendance is 68,386 for a First Division match against Chelsea on 3 September 1930. The club's highest attendance in the Premier League is 52,647, in a match against Hull City on 19 September 2026. The highest transfer fee received for a Newcastle player is £125 million, from Liverpool for Alexander Isak in September 2025, while the most spent by the club on a player is £69.3 million for forward Nick Woltemade from Bundesliga side VfB Stuttgart in August 2025.

== Players ==
=== First-team squad ===
As of 1 September 2026

Note: Flags indicate national team as defined under FIFA eligibility rules; some limited exceptions apply. Players may hold more than one non-FIFA nationality.

No.	Pos.	Nation	Player
1	GK	ENG	Nick Pope
2	DF	ENG	Tino Livramento
3	DF	ENG	Lewis Hall
4	DF	NED	Sven Botman
5	DF	SUI	Fabian Schär
6	MF	ESP	Nico González
7	FW	BRA	Joelinton (vice-captain)
8	MF	FRA	Aladji Bamba
9	FW	COD	Yoane Wissa
10	FW	DEN	William Osula
11	FW	ENG	Harvey Barnes
12	DF	GER	Malick Thiaw (vice-captain)
14	MF	NED	Sean Steur

No.	Pos.	Nation	Player
17	FW	CIV	Bazoumana Touré
19	FW	SWE	Anthony Elanga
20	FW	BEL	Matias Fernandez-Pardo
21	GK	CZE	Lukáš Horníček
23	MF	ENG	Jacob Murphy
24	GK	FRA	Ewen Jaouen
28	MF	ENG	Joe Willock
29	GK	ENG	Mark Gillespie
31	GK	ENG	Aidan Harris
33	DF	ENG	Dan Burn (captain)
37	DF	BIH	Amar Dedić
41	MF	ENG	Jacob Ramsey
67	MF	ENG	Lewis Miley

=== Out on loan ===
Note: Flags indicate national team as defined under FIFA eligibility rules; some limited exceptions apply. Players may hold more than one non-FIFA nationality.

No.	Pos.	Nation	Player
27	FW	GER	Nick Woltemade (at Juventus until 30 June 2027)
30	DF	SCO	Harrison Ashby (at Luton Town until 30 June 2027)
62	FW	ENG	Sean Neave (at Wolverhampton Wanderers until 30 June 2027)

No.	Pos.	Nation	Player
—	GK	GRE	Odysseas Vlachodimos (at Sevilla until 30 June 2027)
—	DF	IRL	Alex Murphy (at FC Kaiserslautern until 30 June 2027)
—	MF	ESP	Antonio Cordero (at Cádiz until 30 June 2027)

=== Under-21s and Academy ===
The following Under-21 players have previously been named in a Newcastle United squad for a competitive match:

Note: Flags indicate national team as defined under FIFA eligibility rules; some limited exceptions apply. Players may hold more than one non-FIFA nationality.

No.	Pos.	Nation	Player
44	FW	ENG	Kyran Thompson
47	MF	KOR	Park Seung-soo
48	DF	SRB	Miodrag Pivaš
49	FW	GEO	Vakhtang Salia
50	MF	ENG	Trevan Sanusi

No.	Pos.	Nation	Player
51	DF	ENG	Leo Shahar
70	MF	ENG	Sam Alabi
76	MF	ENG	Mason Miley
77	FW	ENG	Michael Mills

=== Player of the Year ===
Source: Newcastle United F.C.

Season	Winner
1975–76	Alan Gowling
1976–77	Micky Burns
1977–78	Irving Nattrass
1978–79	Peter Withe
1979–80	Alan Shoulder
1980–81	Kevin Carr
1981–82	Mick Martin
1982–83	Kevin Keegan
1983–84	Kevin Keegan
1984–85	Peter Beardsley
1985–86	Peter Beardsley
1986–87	Paul Goddard
1987–88	Paul Gascoigne

Season	Winner
1988–89	John Hendrie
1989–90	Micky Quinn
1990–91	John Burridge
1991–92	Gavin Peacock
1992–93	Lee Clark
1993–94	Andy Cole
1994–95	Barry Venison
1995–96	Darren Peacock
1996–97	Steve Watson
1997–98	David Batty
1998–99	Alan Shearer
1999–2000	Alan Shearer
2000–01	Shay Given

Season	Winner
2001–02	Nolberto Solano
2002–03	Alan Shearer
2003–04	Olivier Bernard
2004–05	Shay Given
2005–06	Shay Given
2006–07	Nicky Butt
2007–08	Habib Beye
2008–09	Sébastien Bassong
2009–10	José Enrique
2010–11	Fabricio Coloccini
2011–12	Tim Krul
2012–13	Davide Santon
2013–14	Mike Williamson

Season	Winner
2014–15	Daryl Janmaat
2015–16	Rob Elliot
2016–17	Ciaran Clark
2017–18	Jamaal Lascelles
2018–19	Salomón Rondón
2019–20	Martin Dúbravka
2020–21	Callum Wilson
2021–22	Joelinton
2022–23	Kieran Trippier
2023–24	Anthony Gordon
2024–25	Dan Burn
2025–26	Bruno Guimarães

== Staff ==
=== Board members ===
Position	Staff
Chairman	(Saudi Arabia) Yasir Al-Rumayyan
Director	(Saudi Arabia) Abdulmajid Alhagbani
Director	(Saudi Arabia) Asmaa Rezeeq
Director	(England) Jamie Reuben
Director	(England) Roger Thornton
Director	(Spain) Jacobo Solis

Last updated: 2026-07-31
Source: Company Information

=== Executive leadership ===
Position	Staff
Chief Executive Officer	(Canada) David Hopkinson
Chief Financial Officer	(England) Simon Capper
Chief Operating Officer	(England) Brad Miller
Chief Revenue Officer	(England) Dave O'Connor
Chief Marketing Officer	(England) Steven Taylor
Chief People Officer	(England) Graeme Johnson

Last updated: 2026-07-31

=== Football leadership ===
Position	Staff
Sporting Director	(Scotland) Ross Wilson
Assistant Sporting Director	(Scotland) Jack Ross
Technical Director	(United States) Sudarshan Gopaladesikan
Academy Director	(England) Steve Harper
Venue Director	(England) Eddie Rutherford
Director of Football Administration	(England) Richard Hines
Director of Partnerships	(England) Jonathan Kane
Director of Retail	(England) Stuart Middlemiss
Director of Performance	(England) James Bunce
Assistant Director of Performance	(France) Yann Le Meur

Last updated: 2026-09-27

=== Department heads ===
Position	Staff
Head of Media and Communications	(England) Lee Marshall
Head of Corporate Affairs	(Nigeria) Shola Ameobi
Head of Catering and Hospitality	(England) Colin Perkins
Head of Psychology	(England) Ian Mitchell
Head of Data and Insight	(England) Michael Emmerson
Head of Performance Analysis	(England) Thomas Coffield
Head of First Team Recruitment	(Portugal) Tomás Amaral
Head of Youth Recruitment	(England) Paul Midgley

Last updated: 2026-10-27

=== Recruitment staff ===
Position	Staff
First team and under-21s scouts	(England) Mick Tait (England) David Goodwin (Scotland) Billy Jeffrey (England) Peter Clark (England) Daniel Laurent (France) Hédy Hassine (Netherlands) Marcel Bout (Germany) Florian Meier (Germany) Thomas Federspiel (Germany) Andreas Fehse
Academy scouts	(England) Paul McLaren (England) Paul Baker (England) Glenn Craggs (England) Eddie Black (England) Matthew Hodges (Scotland) James Fowler

Last updated: 2026-07-31

=== First team staff ===
Position	Staff
Head Coach	(Germany) Matthias Jaissle
Assistant Coaches	(Austria) Alexander Hauser (Turkey) Engin Yanova (Germany) Florens Koch
Goalkeeping Coaches	(Germany) Alexander Bade (Iraq) Shwan Jalal
Set Piece Coach	(Denmark) Martin Mark
Strength and Conditioning Coaches	(England) James Allan (England) Craig Musham (England) Nick Grantham
Club doctor	(England) Paul Catterson
Nutritionist	(England) Andreas Kasper
Physiotherapists	(Spain) Daniel Marti (England) Sean Beech (England) Nathan Ring (England) Jonny King (Scotland) Sean Miller
Sport Scientists	(England) John Fitzpatrick (England) Liam Mason (Scotland) Colin Clancy
Coach Analysts	(Germany) Maximilian Fischer (Germany) Steffen Konrad
Performance Analysts	(England) Jordan Tribe (England) Matthew Hutchinson (England) Ed Davies (England) Kieran Taylor
Team Manager	(Italy) Andrea Romeo
Kit Managers	(England) George Ramshaw (England) Ray Thompson
Loan Player Manager	(England) Peter Ramage

Last updated: 2026-08-26

=== Under-21s and Academy staff ===
Position	Staff
Head Coach, U21	(England) Robbie Stockdale
Assistant Coach, U21	(England) Neil Winskill
Head Coach, U18	(England) Neil Moore
Assistant Coach, U18	(England) James Marwood

Last updated: 2026-07-31

== Honours ==
=== Domestic ===
League

- First Division / Premier League (level 1)
  - Champions: 1904–05, 1906–07, 1908–09, 1926–27
  - Runners-up: 1995–96, 1996–97
- Second Division / First Division / Championship (level 2)
  - Champions: 1964–65, 1992–93, 2009–10, 2016–17
  - Runners-up: 1897–98, 1947–48

Cup

- FA Cup
  - Winners: 1909–10, 1923–24, 1931–32, 1950–51, 1951–52, 1954–55
  - Runners-up: 1904–05, 1905–06, 1907–08, 1910–11, 1973–74, 1997–98, 1998–99
- Football League Cup / EFL Cup
  - Winners: 2024–25
  - Runners-up: 1975–76, 2022–23
- FA Charity Shield
  - Winners: 1909
  - Runners-up: 1932, 1951, 1952, 1955, 1996
- Sheriff of London Charity Shield
  - Winners: 1907

=== European ===
- Inter-Cities Fairs Cup
  - Winners: 1968–69
- UEFA Intertoto Cup
  - Winners: 2006

Minor titles

- Texaco Cup
  - Winners: 1973–74, 1974–75
- Anglo-Italian Cup
  - Winners: 1973
