= List of Newcastle United F.C. seasons =

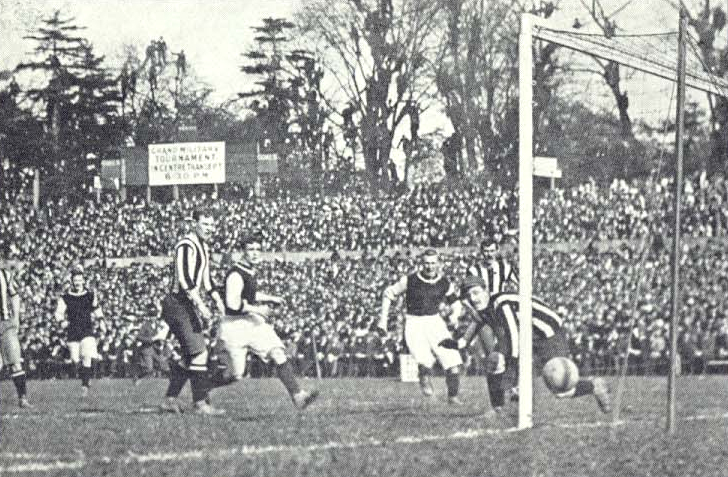
Newcastle playing in the 1905 FA Cup final against Aston Villa, which was lost 2–0

This is a list of Newcastle United Football Club seasons played in English football and details the club's achievements in all major competitions, and the top scorers for each season.

== Seasons ==
Before the foundation of the Premier League (from the beginning of the 1992–93 season), Division 1 was the top division in the league. Subsequently, Division 1 became the second tier level. Newcastle have spent 94 years in the top flight of English Football.

A chart showing the progress of Newcastle United Football Club from its entry into the Football League in 1894 to the present. Since promotion into the Premier League in the year after the league's inception, NUFC have spent two seasons outside of the top flight.

Season	League									FA Cup	League Cup	Charity Shield	Europe	Top goalscorer(s)	
Season	Division	Pld	W	D	L	GF	GA	Pts	Pos	FA Cup	League Cup	Charity Shield	Europe	Player(s)	Goals
1892–93	North	10	5	1	4	30	19	11	2nd	R1				Jock Sorley Willie Thompson	7
1893–94	Div 2 (Tier 2)	28	15	6	7	66	39	36	4th	R2				Joseph Wallace	17
1894–95	Div 2 (Tier 2)	30	12	3	15	72	84	27	10th	R2				Willie Thompson	19
1895–96	Div 2 (Tier 2)	30	16	2	12	73	50	34	5th	R2				Willie Wardrope	20
1896–97	Div 2 (Tier 2)	30	17	1	12	56	52	35	5th	R1				Richard Smellie	15
1897–98	Div 2 (Tier 2)	30	21	3	6	64	32	45	2nd	R2				Jack Peddie	18
1898–99	Div 1 (Tier 1)	34	11	8	15	49	48	30	13th	R2				Jack Peddie	20
1899–1900	Div 1 (Tier 1)	34	13	10	11	53	53	36	5th	R2				Jack Peddie	16
1900–01	Div 1 (Tier 1)	34	14	10	10	42	37	38	6th	R1				Jack Peddie	17
1901–02	Div 1 (Tier 1)	34	14	9	11	48	34	37	3rd	QF				Richard Roberts	12
1902–03	Div 1 (Tier 1)	34	14	4	16	41	51	32	14th	R1				Bob McColl	10
1903–04	Div 1 (Tier 1)	34	18	6	10	58	45	42	4th	R1				Bill Appleyard	16
1904–05	Div 1 (Tier 1)	34	23	2	9	72	33	48	1st	RU				Jimmy Howie	18
1905–06	Div 1 (Tier 1)	38	18	7	13	74	48	43	4th	RU				Ronald Orr	21
1906–07	Div 1 (Tier 1)	38	22	7	9	74	46	51	1st	R1				Bill Appleyard	18
1907–08	Div 1 (Tier 1)	38	15	12	11	65	54	42	4th	RU				Bill Appleyard	21
1908–09	Div 1 (Tier 1)	38	24	5	9	65	41	53	1st	SF				Albert Shepherd	15
1909–10	Div 1 (Tier 1)	38	19	7	12	70	56	45	4th	W		W		Albert Shepherd	31
1910–11	Div 1 (Tier 1)	38	15	10	13	61	43	40	8th	RU				Albert Shepherd	33
1911–12	Div 1 (Tier 1)	38	18	8	12	64	50	44	3rd	R1				Billy Hibbert Jimmy Stewart	14
1912–13	Div 1 (Tier 1)	38	13	8	17	47	47	34	14th	QF				Jimmy Stewart	9
1913–14	Div 1 (Tier 1)	38	13	11	14	39	48	37	11th	R1				Albert Shepherd	10
1914–15	Div 1 (Tier 1)	38	11	10	17	46	48	32	15th	QF				Billy Hibbert	16
No competitive football was played between 1915 and 1919 due to World War I
1919–20	Div 1 (Tier 1)	42	17	9	16	44	39	43	8th	R2				Andy Smailes	10
1920–21	Div 1 (Tier 1)	42	20	10	12	66	45	50	5th	R3				Neil Harris	20
1921–22	Div 1 (Tier 1)	42	18	10	14	59	45	46	7th	R2				Neil Harris	23
1922–23	Div 1 (Tier 1)	42	18	12	12	45	37	48	4th	R1				Tom McDonald	15
1923–24	Div 1 (Tier 1)	42	17	10	15	60	54	44	9th	W				Neil Harris	23
1924–25	Div 1 (Tier 1)	42	16	16	10	61	42	48	6th	R2				Neil Harris	20
1925–26	Div 1 (Tier 1)	42	16	10	16	84	75	42	10th	R5				Hughie Gallacher	23
1926–27	Div 1 (Tier 1)	42	25	6	11	96	58	67	1st	R5				Hughie Gallacher	39
1927–28	Div 1 (Tier 1)	42	15	13	14	79	81	43	9th	R3				Hughie Gallacher	21
1928–29	Div 1 (Tier 1)	42	19	6	17	70	72	44	10th	R3				Hughie Gallacher	24
1929–30	Div 1 (Tier 1)	42	15	7	20	71	92	37	19th	QF				Hughie Gallacher	34
1930–31	Div 1 (Tier 1)	42	15	6	21	78	87	36	17th	R4				Duncan Hutchinson	14
1931–32	Div 1 (Tier 1)	42	18	6	18	80	87	42	11th	W				Jimmy Boyd	23
1932–33	Div 1 (Tier 1)	42	22	5	15	71	63	49	5th	R3		RU		Jack Allen	19
1933–34	Div 1 (Tier 1)	42	10	14	18	68	77	34	21st	R3				Sam Weaver	14
1934–35	Div 2 (Tier 2)	42	22	4	16	89	68	48	6th	R4				Jack Smith	16
1935–36	Div 2 (Tier 2)	42	20	6	16	88	79	46	8th	R5				Jack Smith	26
1936–37	Div 2 (Tier 2)	42	22	5	15	80	56	49	4th	R3				Jack Smith	24
1937–38	Div 2 (Tier 2)	42	14	8	20	51	58	36	19th	R3				Bill Imrie John Park	9
1938–39	Div 2 (Tier 2)	42	18	10	14	61	48	46	9th	R5				Billy Cairns	20
1939–40	Div 2 (Tier 2)	3	1	0	2	8	6	2	N/A	N/A				Ray Bowden	3
No competitive football was played between 1939 and 1945 due to World War II
1945–46	There was no league football in 1945–46									R3				Jackie Milburn	2
1946–47	Div 2 (Tier 2)	42	19	10	13	95	62	48	5th	SF				Charlie Wayman	34
1947–48	Div 2 (Tier 2)	42	24	8	10	72	41	56	2nd	R3				Jackie Milburn	20
1948–49	Div 1 (Tier 1)	42	20	12	10	70	56	52	4th	R3				Jackie Milburn	19
1949–50	Div 1 (Tier 1)	42	19	12	11	77	55	50	5th	R4				Jackie Milburn	21
1950–51	Div 1 (Tier 1)	42	18	13	11	62	53	49	4th	W				Jackie Milburn	25
1951–52	Div 1 (Tier 1)	42	18	9	15	98	73	45	8th	W		RU		George Robledo	39
1952–53	Div 1 (Tier 1)	42	14	9	19	59	70	37	16th	R4		RU		George Robledo	18
1953–54	Div 1 (Tier 1)	42	14	10	18	72	77	38	15th	R5				Jackie Milburn	19
1954–55	Div 1 (Tier 1)	42	17	9	16	89	77	43	8th	W				Bobby Mitchell	23
1955–56	Div 1 (Tier 1)	42	17	7	18	85	70	41	11th	QF		RU		Vic Keeble	29
1956–57	Div 1 (Tier 1)	42	14	8	20	67	87	36	17th	R4				Reg Davies Len White	13
1957–58	Div 1 (Tier 1)	42	12	8	22	73	81	32	19th	R4				Len White	25
1958–59	Div 1 (Tier 1)	42	17	7	18	80	80	41	11th	R3				Len White	25
1959–60	Div 1 (Tier 1)	42	18	8	16	82	78	44	8th	R3				Len White	29
1960–61	Div 1 (Tier 1)	42	11	10	21	86	109	32	21st	QF	R1			Len White	29
1961–62	Div 2 (Tier 2)	42	15	9	18	64	58	39	11th	R3	R2			Ivor Allchurch	11
1962–63	Div 2 (Tier 2)	42	18	11	13	79	59	47	7th	R4	R2			Jimmy Fell Barrie Thomas	16
1963–64	Div 2 (Tier 2)	42	20	5	17	74	69	45	8th	R3	R3			Barrie Thomas	21
1964–65	Div 2 (Tier 2)	42	24	9	9	81	45	57	1st	R3	R2			Ron McGarry	16
1965–66	Div 1 (Tier 1)	42	14	9	19	50	63	37	15th	R4	R2			Alan Suddick	11
1966–67	Div 1 (Tier 1)	42	12	9	21	39	81	33	20th	R4	R2			Pop Robson	11
1967–68	Div 1 (Tier 1)	42	13	15	14	54	67	41	10th	R3	R2			Wyn Davies	12
1968–69	Div 1 (Tier 1)	42	15	14	13	61	55	44	9th	R4	R3		Inter-Cities Fairs Cup – W	Pop Robson	30
1969–70	Div 1 (Tier 1)	42	17	13	12	57	35	47	7th	R3	R2		Inter-Cities Fairs Cup – QF	Pop Robson	24
1970–71	Div 1 (Tier 1)	42	14	13	15	44	46	41	12th	R3	R2		Inter-Cities Fairs Cup – R2	Pop Robson	10
1971–72	Div 1 (Tier 1)	42	15	11	16	49	52	41	11th	R3	R3			Malcolm Macdonald	30
1972–73	Div 1 (Tier 1)	42	16	13	13	60	51	45	9th	R4	R3			Malcolm Macdonald	25
1973–74	Div 1 (Tier 1)	42	13	12	17	49	48	38	15th	RU	R3			Malcolm Macdonald	28
1974–75	Div 1 (Tier 1)	42	15	9	18	59	72	39	15th	R4	QF			Malcolm Macdonald	32
1975–76	Div 1 (Tier 1)	42	15	9	18	71	62	39	15th	QF	RU			Alan Gowling	30
1976–77	Div 1 (Tier 1)	42	18	13	11	64	49	49	5th	R4	R4			Micky Burns	17
1977–78	Div 1 (Tier 1)	42	6	10	26	42	78	22	21st	R4	R2		UEFA Cup – R2	Micky Burns	16
1978–79	Div 2 (Tier 2)	42	17	8	17	51	55	42	8th	R4	R2			Peter Withe	16
1979–80	Div 2 (Tier 2)	42	15	14	13	53	49	44	9th	R3	R2			Alan Shoulder	21
1980–81	Div 2 (Tier 2)	42	14	14	14	30	45	42	11th	R5	R2			Bobby Shinton	7
1981–82	Div 2 (Tier 2)	42	18	8	16	52	50	62	9th	R4	R2			Imre Varadi	20
1982–83	Div 2 (Tier 2)	42	18	13	11	75	53	67	5th	R3	R2			Imre Varadi	22
1983–84	Div 2 (Tier 2)	42	24	8	10	85	53	80	3rd	R3	R2			Kevin Keegan	27
1984–85	Div 1 (Tier 1)	42	13	13	16	55	70	52	14th	R3	R3			Peter Beardsley	17
1985–86	Div 1 (Tier 1)	42	17	12	13	67	72	63	11th	R3	R3			Peter Beardsley	19
1986–87	Div 1 (Tier 1)	42	12	11	19	47	65	47	17th	R5	R2			Paul Goddard	13
1987–88	Div 1 (Tier 1)	40	14	14	12	55	53	56	8th	R5	R3			Mirandinha Michael O'Neill	13
1988–89	Div 1 (Tier 1)	38	7	10	21	32	63	31	20th	R3	R2			Mirandinha	10
1989–90	Div 2 (Tier 2)	46	22	14	10	80	55	80	3rd	R5	R3			Micky Quinn	36
1990–91	Div 2 (Tier 2)	46	14	17	15	49	56	59	11th	R4	R2			Micky Quinn	20
1991–92	Div 2 (Tier 2)	46	13	13	20	66	84	52	20th (Note: Lowest League Finish)	R3	R3			Gavin Peacock	21
The Premier League was founded, thus becoming the new Tier 1 of English football. This resulted in a renumbering of the football league system, with the previous division 2 becoming division 1 but remaining as the second tier of the pyramid
1992–93	Div 1 (Tier 2)	46	29	9	8	92	38	96	1st	R5	R3			David Kelly	28
1993–94	Premier League	42	23	8	11	82	41	77	3rd	R4	R3			Andy Cole	41
1994–95	Premier League	42	20	12	10	67	47	72	6th	QF	R4		UEFA Cup – R2	Andy Cole	15
1995–96	Premier League	38	24	6	8	66	37	78	2nd	R3	QF			Les Ferdinand	29
1996–97	Premier League	38	19	11	8	73	40	68	2nd	R4	R4	RU	UEFA Cup – QF	Alan Shearer	28
1997–98	Premier League	38	11	11	16	35	44	44	13th	RU	QF		UEFA Champions League – GR1	John Barnes Alan Shearer	7
1998–99	Premier League	38	11	13	14	48	54	46	13th	RU	R4		UEFA Cup Winners' Cup – R1	Alan Shearer	21
1999–00	Premier League	38	14	10	14	63	54	52	11th	SF	R3		UEFA Cup – R3	Alan Shearer	30
2000–01	Premier League	38	14	9	15	44	50	51	11th	R3	R4			Carl Cort Alan Shearer Nolberto Solano	7
2001–02	Premier League	38	21	8	9	74	52	71	4th	QF	QF		UEFA Intertoto Cup – RU	Alan Shearer	27
2002–03	Premier League	38	21	6	11	63	48	69	3rd	R3	R3		UEFA Champions League – GR2	Alan Shearer	25
2003–04	Premier League	38	13	17	8	52	40	56	5th	R4	R3		UEFA Champions League – QR3 UEFA Cup – SF	Alan Shearer	28
2004–05	Premier League	38	10	14	14	47	57	44	14th	SF	R4		UEFA Cup – QF	Alan Shearer	19
2005–06	Premier League	38	17	7	14	47	42	58	7th	QF	R4		UEFA Intertoto Cup – SF	Alan Shearer	14
2006–07	Premier League	38	11	10	17	38	47	43	13th	R3	QF		UEFA Intertoto Cup – W UEFA Cup – R16	Obafemi Martins	17
2007–08	Premier League	38	11	10	17	46	65	43	12th	R4	R3			Michael Owen	13
2008–09	Premier League	38	7	13	18	40	59	34	18th	R3	R3			Michael Owen	10
2009–10	Championship (Tier 2)	46	30	12	4	90	35	102	1st	R4	R3			Andy Carroll	19
2010–11	Premier League	38	11	13	14	56	57	46	12th	R3	R4			Kevin Nolan	12
2011–12	Premier League	38	19	8	11	56	51	65	5th	R4	R4			Demba Ba	16
2012–13	Premier League	38	11	8	19	45	68	41	16th	R3	R3		UEFA Europa League – QF	Demba Ba	13
2013–14	Premier League	38	15	4	19	43	59	49	10th	R3	R4			Loïc Rémy	14
2014–15	Premier League	38	10	9	19	40	63	39	15th	R3	QF			Papiss Cissé	11
2015–16	Premier League	38	9	10	19	44	65	37	18th	R3	R3			Georginio Wijnaldum	11
2016–17	Championship (Tier 2)	46	29	7	10	85	40	94	1st	R4	QF			Dwight Gayle	23
2017–18	Premier League	38	12	8	18	39	47	44	10th	R4	R2			Ayoze Pérez	10
2018–19	Premier League	38	12	9	17	42	48	45	13th	R4	R2			Ayoze Pérez	13
2019–20	Premier League	38	11	11	16	38	58	44	13th	QF	R2			Miguel Almirón	8
2020–21	Premier League	38	12	9	17	46	62	45	12th	R3	QF			Callum Wilson	12
2021–22	Premier League	38	13	10	15	44	62	49	11th	R3	R2			Callum Wilson	8
2022–23	Premier League	38	19	14	5	68	33	71	4th	R3	RU			Callum Wilson	18
2023–24	Premier League	38	18	6	14	85	62	60	7th	QF	QF		UEFA Champions League – GS	Alexander Isak	25
2024–25	Premier League	38	20	6	12	68	47	66	5th	R5	W			Alexander Isak	27
2025–26	Premier League	38	14	7	17	53	55	49	12th	R5	SF		UEFA Champions League – R16	Anthony Gordon	17

=== Overall ===
- Seasons spent at Tier 1 of the football league system: 94
- Seasons spent at Tier 2 of the football league system: 29

(up to and including 2025–26)

== Key ==
Winners	Runners-up	Promoted	Relegated

- Pld = Matches played
- W = Matches won
- D = Matches drawn
- L = Matches lost
- GF = Goals for
- GA = Goals against
- Pts = Points
- Pos = Final position
- Cham = EFL Championship
- Div 1 = Football League First Division
- Div 2 = Football League Second Division
- North = Northern League
- Prem = Premier League
- QR1 = First qualifying round
- QR2 = Second qualifying round
- QR3 = Third qualifying round
- QR4 = Fourth qualifying round
- RInt = Intermediate round
- R1 = Round 1
- R2 = Round 2
- R3 = Round 3
- R4 = Round 4
- R5 = Round 5
- R6 = Round 6
- R16 = Round of 16
- GS = Group stage
- GR1 = First group stage
- GR2 = Second group stage
- QF = Quarter-finals
- SF = Semi-finals
- RU = Runners-up
- S = Shared
- W = Winners
- Goals for top scorers in all competitions (Football League or Premier League, FA Cup, League Cup and European) are counted.
- Top scorers shown **in bold** are players who were also top scorers in their division that season.
