= Kieran Trippier =

English footballer (born 1990)

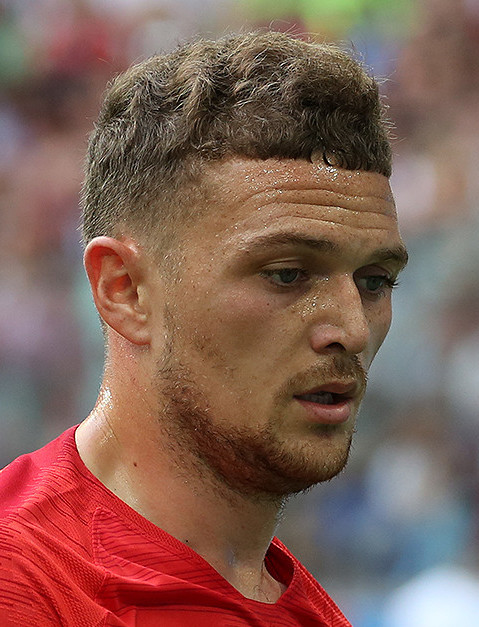
- Trippier playing for England at the 2018 FIFA World Cup

Personal information
- Full name: Kieran John Trippier
- Date of birth: 19 September 1990 (age 36)
- Place of birth: Bury, England
- Height: 5 ft 8 in (1.73 m)
- Position: Right-back

Team information
- Current team: Wolverhampton Wanderers
- Number: 2

Youth career
- 1999–2009: Manchester City

Senior career*
Years	Team	Apps	(Gls)
2009–2012	Manchester City	0	(0)
2010	→ Barnsley (loan)	3	(0)
2010–2011	→ Barnsley (loan)	39	(2)
2011–2012	→ Burnley (loan)	25	(1)
2012–2015	Burnley	145	(4)
2015–2019	Tottenham Hotspur	69	(2)
2019–2022	Atlético Madrid	68	(0)
2022–2026	Newcastle United	118	(4)
2026–	Wolverhampton Wanderers	7	(0)

International career
2007	England U18	1	(0)
2008–2009	England U19	11	(0)
2009	England U20	3	(0)
2010–2011	England U21	2	(0)
2017–2024	England	54	(1)
Medal record
Men's football
Representing England
UEFA European Championship
Runner-up	2020 Europe	Team
Runner-up	2024 Germany	Team
- * Club domestic league appearances and goals as of 21:52, 31 October 2026 (UTC)

Kieran John Trippier (/ˈkɪərˌɔːn ˈtrɪpjər/ KEER-awn TRIP-yər; born 19 September 1990) is an English professional footballer who plays as a right-back for EFL Championship club Wolverhampton Wanderers.

Trippier started his career in the youth system at Manchester City but failed to make the breakthrough to the first team, having two loans at Championship club Barnsley. In 2011, he signed for Championship club Burnley on a season-long loan which was made permanent in January 2012 for an undisclosed fee. He was named in the Championship PFA Team of the Year for two consecutive seasons in 2012–13 and 2013–14. In 2014, he secured promotion with Burnley to the Premier League as the team finished runners-up in the Championship. A year later, he signed for Tottenham Hotspur for a £3.5 million fee. After four years in North London, during which he became part of the squad that finished as runners-up in the 2019 Champions League final, Trippier joined Spanish side Atlético Madrid, where he helped the team win the 2020–21 La Liga title. He returned to England in 2022 with Newcastle United, where he won the 2025 EFL Cup.

Trippier also represented England at all levels from under-18 to under-21, featuring in the 2009 UEFA European Under-19 Championship and 2009 FIFA U-20 World Cup. He made his debut for the senior international team in June 2017 and played in the 2018 FIFA World Cup, where he scored directly from a free kick in the semi-final. He was also included in England's squads for UEFA Euro 2020, the 2022 FIFA World Cup, and UEFA Euro 2024.

== Early life ==
Kieran John Trippier was born on 19 September 1990 in Bury, Greater Manchester, to Chris Trippier and Eleanor Lomax. His father is mixed race, and through him Trippier is of Jamaican descent. Trippier has three brothers, Chris, Curtis and Kelvin. He grew up in Summerseat in Ramsbottom, Greater Manchester, and attended Holcombe Brook Primary School until 2002, followed by Woodhey High School where he studied for five years and finished in 2007. He played in the school football team and helped them win the Bury Cup twice and Greater Manchester Trophy once. His family are Manchester United fans, and although he was scouted by United when he was eight, he chose to join Manchester City's academy as he knew a few friends there and it was local for him.

== Club career ==
=== Manchester City ===
Trippier joined Manchester City's academy at the age of nine, where he progressed through the ranks at the club, signing his first professional contract in 2007. In the 2007–08 season he became a regular in the reserve team and was part of the team that won the FA Youth Cup. In August 2009, he featured in the prestige friendly against FC Barcelona at the Camp Nou. He joined the first team for the pre-season tour of the United States in 2010.

In February 2010, he joined Championship club Barnsley on a one-month loan. He went on to make three appearances during the loan spell, making his debut in a 2–1 defeat at Middlesbrough. His loan was cut short after he suffered an injury at Scunthorpe United which kept him out for ten days. In August 2010, he re-joined Barnsley for his second spell with the club on a six-month loan deal. He made his second debut for the club in the 1–0 home defeat to Rochdale in the League Cup. In January 2011, Trippier agreed a deal to stay at Barnsley for the remainder of the 2010–11 season. He scored his first senior goal for Barnsley in a 3–3 draw with Leeds United, with a curling free kick from 25 yards out at Elland Road in February 2011. His second goal came against local rivals Doncaster Rovers with another free kick, equalising late on for the hosts at Oakwell. He went on to make forty-one appearances in all competitions, winning the Young Player of the Year award.

=== Burnley ===
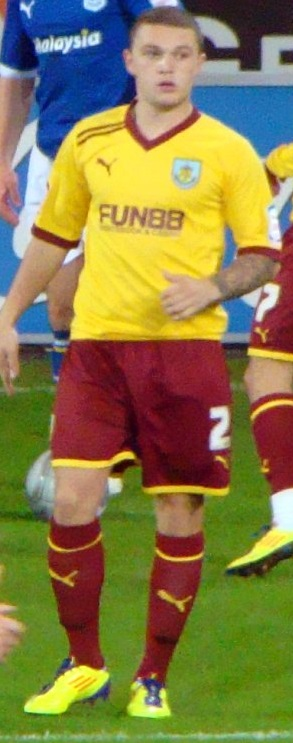
Trippier playing for Burnley in 2011

In July 2011, Trippier joined Championship club Burnley on a season-long loan as a replacement for the departing Tyrone Mears. He made his debut for the Clarets in August 2011, a 2–2 home draw with Watford. His first goal for the club came in September 2011, with a superb long-range free kick against Milton Keynes Dons in a 2–1 win in the League Cup. His first league goal came in December 2011, a 1–0 win over Brighton & Hove Albion at the Falmer Stadium, with a powerful shot from the edge of the box. In December 2011, after impressing during his loan, Trippier was nominated for the Championship Player of the Month award. On 2 January 2012, he received his first professional red card for picking up two bookings in a 2–1 defeat to Leeds United. A day later, Burnley signed Trippier on a permanent deal for an undisclosed fee, signing a three-and-a-half-year contract. In January 2012 he scored his second goal for the club, scoring from range in a 2–0 win away to Middlesbrough. In March 2012, he scored the first in a 5–1 rout against Portsmouth at Fratton Park. He played in all 46 league games in his first season as the club finished in mid-table, going on to win the Burnley Player of the Year award.

Trippier again went on to impress in his second season with the club being a virtual ever-present as he was named in the Championship PFA Team of the Year for 2012–13. In August 2013, he scored a free kick in a 2–0 win over Preston North End in the League Cup. In January 2014, he sealed a 3–2 win over Huddersfield Town with a late goal. He was again named in the Championship PFA Team of the Year for consecutive seasons as Burnley finished runners-up and gained promotion to the Premier League. In May 2014, he signed a new improved three-year contract until 2017 after reported interest from Arsenal.

=== Tottenham Hotspur ===
==== 2015–2017 ====
On 19 June 2015, Trippier signed for Premier League club Tottenham for a reported £3.5 million, after successfully passing a medical, becoming the club's second signing of the summer. Trippier was expected to compete with Kyle Walker at right-back under manager Mauricio Pochettino, and he did not make a start for Tottenham before Christmas as he was eased into the team. On 6 February 2016, he scored his first goal for Tottenham, netting a cross from Dele Alli, which turned out to be the winning goal in a 1–0 win over Watford. Trippier appeared in six games for Tottenham during the Premier League season, making five starts as Walker displayed his best form in recent years. However, Trippier played in every minute of Tottenham's Europa League campaign that reached the last 16.

Despite rumours of a move to Southampton, Trippier confirmed he was "really happy at the club" and that he was "not thinking of leaving". Trippier made his Champions League debut in a Group stage match at CSKA Moscow on 27 September 2016. He performed well in the right-back position as replacement for Kyle Walker who was injured during the 2016–17 season, and earned his first call-up for the England national squad.

==== 2017–2019 ====
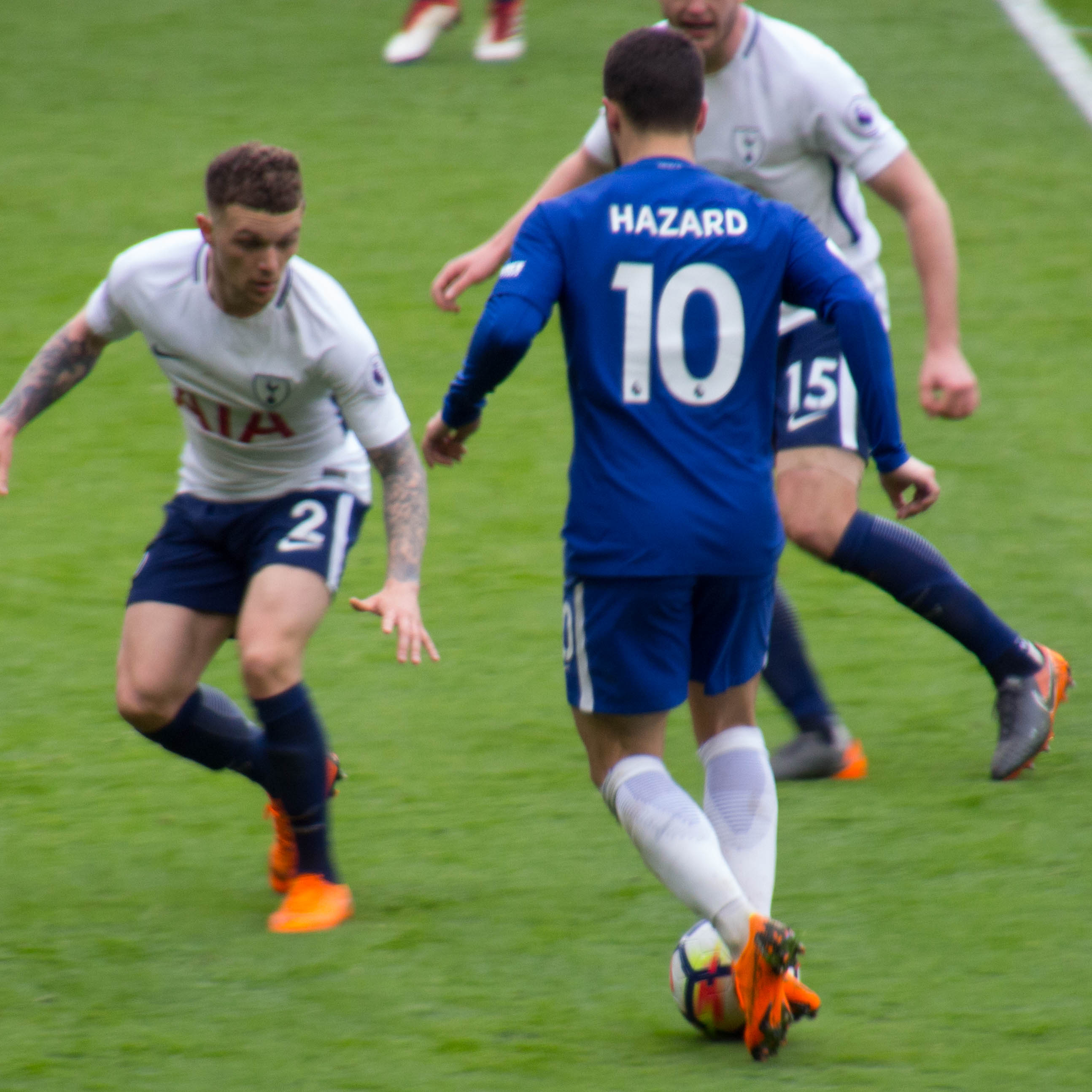
Trippier (left) playing for Tottenham Hotspur in 2018

On 30 June 2017, Trippier agreed a new five-year contract with Tottenham, committing to the club until 2022. As Walker had moved to Manchester City in the summer, Trippier became a regular in the starting line-up of the Spurs team early in the 2017–18 season, although he missed the opening game of the season due to an injury sustained in a pre-season friendly against Juventus that Spurs won 2–1. However, a new signing for Tottenham this season, Serge Aurier, in September meant that he and Aurier regularly rotated in the right-back position. He impressed with his performances in the season, in particular during the UEFA Champions League home match against Real Madrid on 1 November 2017, which Spurs won 3–1.

Trippier made his first start in the 2018–19 season in the game against Fulham, and scored his first goal of the season from a free kick. However, it was generally considered that he had a disappointing season, after suffering from a series of minor injuries, as well as having committed a number of defensive errors. In a match against rivals Chelsea, he scored an own goal, in an attempt to pass the ball to goalkeeper Hugo Lloris. His goal made the scoreline 2–0 to Chelsea, which was also the final result of the game. Trippier was part of the Tottenham squad that reached the 2019 UEFA Champions League final. He started for Tottenham in the final, as Spurs lost 2–0 to Liverpool. He left Tottenham at the end of the season, having made 114 appearances for the club in all competitions.

=== Atlético Madrid ===
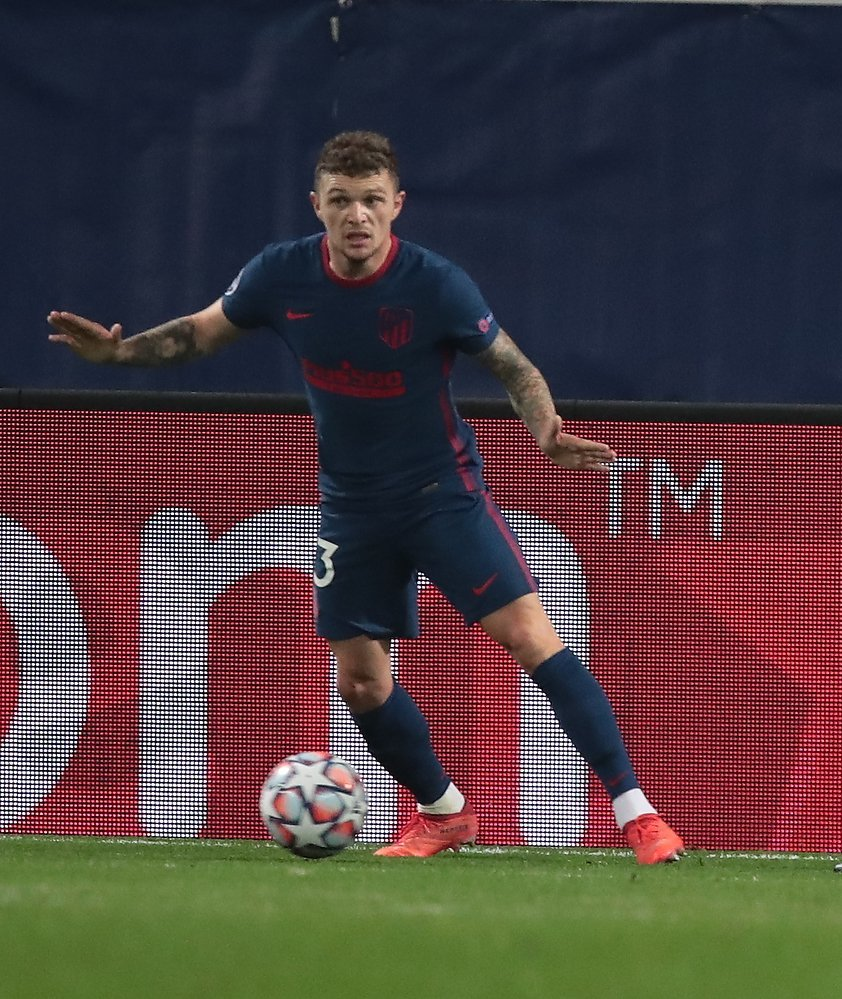
Trippier playing for Atlético Madrid in 2020

Trippier signed for La Liga club Atlético Madrid on 17 July 2019 on a three-year contract, for a fee of £20 million plus add-ons. He became Atlético's first English player in 95 years. In his debut on 18 August in their opening La Liga match against Getafe, he helped the team to a 1–0 home win by providing an assist for Álvaro Morata's goal. In December 2020, Trippier was given a 10-week worldwide football ban and fined £70,000 for four breaches of Football Association betting rules after he allegedly passed on information on his transfer to his friends, who then placed bets on his transfer. Atlético requested a review and the ban was suspended by FIFA until the case was decided by the Court of Arbitration for Sport (CAS). CAS rejected the appeal, and Trippier sat out his ban until his return to the team for the Madrid derby against Real Madrid on 7 March 2021, which ended in a 1–1 draw.

At the end of the 2020–21 season, Trippier won his first major trophy as Atlético secured the La Liga title on the final day of the season.

=== Newcastle United ===
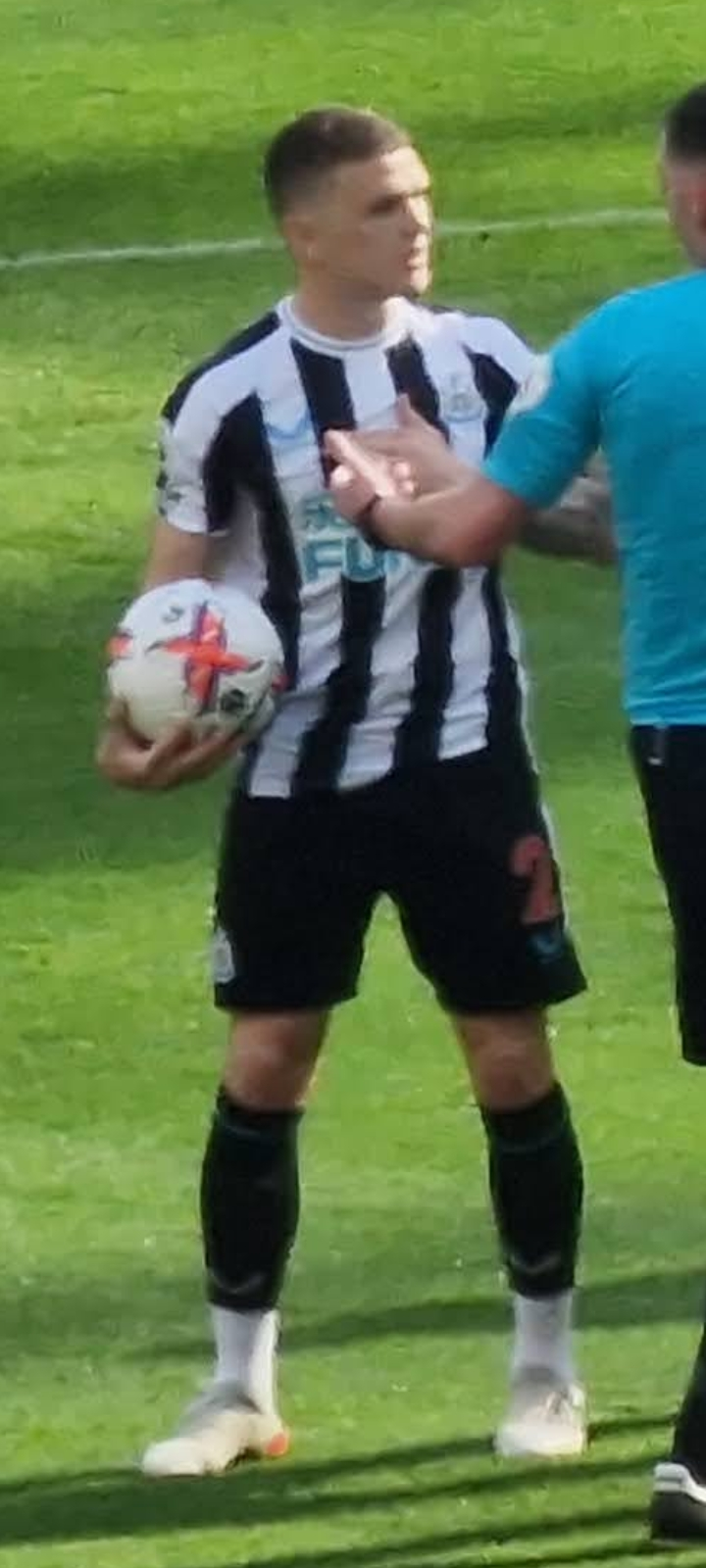
Trippier playing for Newcastle United in 2023

On 7 January 2022, Trippier signed for Premier League club Newcastle United on a two-and-a-half-year contract for a fee of £12 million plus add-ons. He made his debut on 8 January, in the 1–0 FA Cup third round defeat to Cambridge United. On 8 February, Trippier scored his first goal for Newcastle United, a free kick in a 3–1 win at home to Everton. On 13 February, after scoring a second goal for the club, also a free kick, in a 1–0 home win against Aston Villa, Trippier broke his foot. The news was described as "disastrous" for the club by pundit and former player Jermaine Jenas, and the club said they were unsure if Trippier would feature again that season. However, he ended up missing just nine matches and returned as a second-half substitute in the 5–0 loss against Manchester City.

On 21 August 2022, Trippier scored Newcastle's third goal in an eventual 3–3 draw with Manchester City. Later in the match, he was initially sent off by referee Jarred Gillett for a knee-high challenge on Kevin De Bruyne, but it was overturned by VAR. In the 2022–23 season, Trippier was a key member of the Newcastle team that reached third place in the Premier League at the November break, receiving regular praise from pundits for both his defensive and creative skills. The team conceded fewer goals than any other club before the 2022 FIFA World Cup, and joint lowest across the season as a whole. Trippier was also in the top 3 of all players for chances created and crosses delivered. On 27 January 2023, he signed a contract extension until the summer of 2025. In the absence of club captain Jamaal Lascelles, Trippier regularly captained the side during the season and was named Newcastle United's Player of the Year for his performances.

On 24 September 2023, Trippier played in Newcastle's 8–0 win at Sheffield United; he became the second player in Premier League history to assist three headed goals in a match. On 21 October 2023, following Newcastle's 4–0 win over Crystal Palace, Trippier became the first Newcastle player in Premier League history to assist a goal in four consecutive matches. On 16 March 2025, Trippier played the full 90 minutes in the 2025 EFL Cup final as Newcastle United won their first domestic trophy in 70 years, assisting the first goal from a corner. As former captain, he lifted the trophy with current and former captains Bruno Guimarães and Jamaal Lascelles.

=== Wolverhampton Wanderers ===
On 8 June 2026, Trippier signed for EFL Championship side Wolverhampton Wanderers on a two-year deal, with an option for an extra year.

== International career ==
=== Youth ===
Trippier was first called up by England at under-18 level in November 2007 for a friendly against Ghana at the Priestfield Stadium, Gillingham. He made his debut in the 2–0 victory, coming on as a late substitute for Seth Nana Twumasi.

He then progressed to the under-19 squad in November 2008 for the 2009 UEFA European Under-19 Championship qualification match against Albania, making his debut in the 3–0 win in Coleraine, Northern Ireland. He was a mainstay in the team as the squad qualified for the 2009 UEFA European Under-19 Championship finals in Ukraine, and was named in the squad for the finals of the tournament. He featured heavily in the tournament as England reached the final but were beaten 2–0 by the hosts Ukraine.

After reaching the final, England qualified for the 2009 FIFA U-20 World Cup in Egypt a month later and Trippier was named in the 21-man squad. He featured in all three games as England were eliminated finishing bottom of the group with defeats to Uruguay and Ghana, and the 1–1 draw with Uzbekistan. In October 2010, he received his first call-up to the under-21 squad for the 2011 UEFA European Under-21 Championship play-off against Romania, however he failed to feature. He made his debut a month later in the friendly with Germany, a 2–0 defeat. His final appearance for the under-21s came in a friendly against Italy in February 2011 at the Stadio Carlo Castellani in Empoli. He came on as a second-half substitute for Josh McEachran in a 1–0 defeat.

=== Senior ===
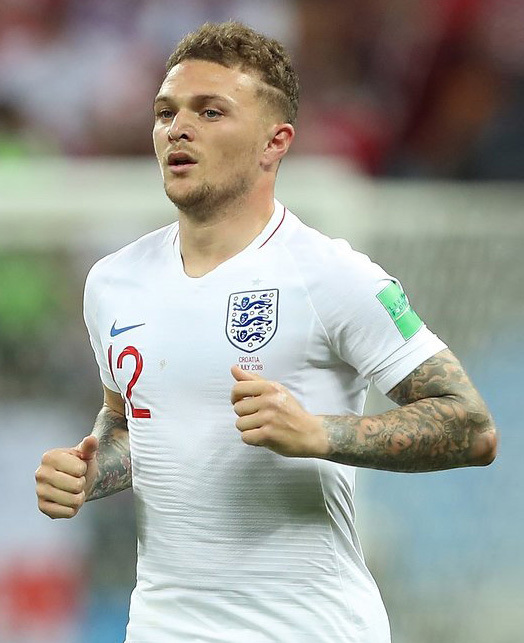
Trippier playing for England at the 2018 FIFA World Cup

Trippier was called up to the senior team for the first time in May 2017 for the 2018 World Cup qualifier against Scotland and the friendly match against France, making his debut against the latter on 13 June in a 3–2 defeat.

He was named in the 23-man England national team squad for the 2018 FIFA World Cup. On 11 July 2018, Trippier scored his first, and only, England goal, opening the scoring with a free kick in a 2–1 extra-time loss to Croatia in Moscow in the semi-final. He was injured in extra time with all substitutions played, so England played the final ten minutes with ten men. He was widely praised as one of the best performers for the England team at the World Cup, particularly for his crosses and dead-ball delivery on set pieces, prompting comparison with David Beckham. He was ranked the most creative player of the tournament, having created 24 chances in all games played.

On 8 October 2020, Trippier captained England for the first time in a 3–0 friendly win over Wales at Wembley Stadium. He assisted the team's second goal with a cross for Conor Coady in the 53rd minute of the match.

On 1 June 2021, Trippier was named in the 26-man squad for the rescheduled UEFA Euro 2020. He started the opening game of the tournament at left-back as England beat Croatia 1–0. After he was an unused substitute in the second and third Group D matches, Trippier returned to the starting line-up at right wing-back in the 2–0 round of 16 win over Germany. He went on to make substitute appearances against Ukraine in the quarter-finals and Denmark in the semi-finals, before making his third start of the tournament in final against Italy, where he provided an assist for Luke Shaw to score in the second minute of the match. It would prove to be England's only goal as the match went on to end 1–1 after extra time and Italy would triumph on penalties.

On 10 November 2022, Trippier was named in the 26-man England squad for the 2022 FIFA World Cup. He made three appearances at the tournament, starting at right back in the opening two Group B matches against Iran and the United States and replacing Luke Shaw as a 65th minute substitute in the third match against Wales.

In June 2024, Trippier was named in England's 26-man squad for UEFA Euro 2024. He started at left back in the team's opening match against Serbia, playing the full 90 minutes as England won 1–0 to go top of Group C. He won his 50th cap for England in the second group match against Denmark on 20 June.

Trippier announced his retirement from international football on 29 August 2024.

== Personal life ==
Trippier has a brother, Kelvin Lomax, who also played professional football but used his mother's surname in his professional career. In June 2016, Trippier married his partner Charlotte in Cyprus. Their son was born in 2016, and their daughter in 2019.

== Career statistics ==
=== Club ===
As of match played 31 October 2026

Appearances and goals by club, season and competition
Club	Season	League			National cup (Note: Includes FA Cup)		League cup (Note: Includes Football League/EFL Cup)		Europe		Other		Total	
Club	Season	Division	Apps	Goals	Apps	Goals	Apps	Goals	Apps	Goals	Apps	Goals	Apps	Goals
Manchester City	2009–10	Premier League	0	0	0	0	0	0	—		—		0	0
Manchester City	2010–11	Premier League	0	0	—		—		—		—		0	0
Manchester City	Total		0	0	0	0	0	0	—		—		0	0
Barnsley (loan)	2009–10	Championship	3	0	—		—		—		—		3	0
Barnsley (loan)	2010–11	Championship	39	2	1	0	1	0	—		—		41	2
Barnsley (loan)	Total		42	2	1	0	1	0	—		—		44	2
Burnley	2011–12	Championship	46	3	0	0	4	1	—		—		50	4
Burnley	2012–13	Championship	45	0	1	0	2	0	—		—		48	0
Burnley	2013–14	Championship	41	2	1	0	4	1	—		—		46	3
Burnley	2014–15	Premier League	38	0	2	0	1	0	—		—		41	0
Burnley	Total		170	5	4	0	11	2	—		—		185	7
Tottenham Hotspur	2015–16	Premier League	6	1	2	0	1	0	10 (Note: Appearances in UEFA Europa League)	0	—		19	1
Tottenham Hotspur	2016–17	Premier League	12	0	5	0	2	0	3 (Note: Appearances in UEFA Champions League)	0	—		22	0
Tottenham Hotspur	2017–18	Premier League	24	0	6	0	2	0	3	0	—		35	0
Tottenham Hotspur	2018–19	Premier League	27	1	1	0	2	0	8	0	—		38	1
Tottenham Hotspur	Total		69	2	14	0	7	0	24	0	—		114	2
Atlético Madrid	2019–20	La Liga	25	0	0	0	—		6	0	2 (Note: Appearances in Supercopa de España)	0	33	0
Atlético Madrid	2020–21	La Liga	28	0	0	0	—		7	0	—		35	0
Atlético Madrid	2021–22	La Liga	15	0	0	0	—		3	0	—		18	0
Atlético Madrid	Total		68	0	0	0	—		16	0	2	0	86	0
Newcastle United	2021–22	Premier League	6	2	1	0	—		—		—		7	2
Newcastle United	2022–23	Premier League	38	1	1	0	7	0	—		—		46	1
Newcastle United	2023–24	Premier League	28	1	3	0	2	0	6	0	—		39	1
Newcastle United	2024–25	Premier League	25	0	2	0	4	0	—		—		31	0
Newcastle United	2025–26	Premier League	21	0	3	0	4	0	9	0	—		37	0
Newcastle United	Total		118	4	10	0	17	0	15	0	—		160	4
Wolverhampton Wanderers	2026–27	Championship	7	0	0	0	2	0	—		—		9	0
Career total			474	13	29	0	37	2	55	0	2	0	598	15

=== International ===
Appearances and goals by national team and year
National team	Year	Apps	Goals
England	2017	3	0
England	2018	13	1
England	2019	3	0
England	2020	6	0
England	2021	10	0
England	2022	5	0
England	2023	6	0
England	2024	8	0
Total		54	1

England score listed first, score column indicates score after each Trippier goal

List of international goals scored by Kieran Trippier
No.	Date	Venue	Cap	Opponent	Score	Result	Competition	Ref.
1	11 July 2018	Luzhniki Stadium, Moscow, Russia	12	Croatia	1–0	1–2	2018 FIFA World Cup	

== Honours ==
Manchester City Youth

- FA Youth Cup: 2007–08

Burnley

- Football League Championship second-place promotion: 2013–14

Tottenham Hotspur

- UEFA Champions League runner-up: 2018–19

Atlético Madrid

- La Liga: 2020–21

Newcastle United

- EFL Cup: 2024–25; runner-up: 2022–23

England U19

- UEFA European Under-19 Championship runner-up: 2009

England

- UEFA European Championship runner-up: 2020, 2024

Individual

- Barnsley Young Player of the Year: 2010–11
- Burnley Player of the Year: 2011–12
- PFA Team of the Year: 2012–13 Championship, 2013–14 Championship, 2022–23 Premier League
- Newcastle United Player of the Year: 2022–23
- North East FWA Player of the Year: 2023
