= Albert Shepherd (footballer) =

English footballer

Personal information
- Date of birth: 10 September 1885
- Place of birth: Great Lever, Bolton, England
- Date of death: 8 November 1929 (aged 44)
- Place of death: Bolton, England
- Position: Forward

Senior career*
Years	Team	Apps	(Gls)
1901–1902	Bolton Temperance		
1902–1903	Blackburn Rovers	0	(0)
1903–1908	Bolton Wanderers	115	(85)
1908–1914	Newcastle United	104	(76)
1914–1915	Bradford City	22	(10)
Total		241	(171)

International career
1906–1911	Football League XI	2	(4)
1906–1911	England	2	(2)
- * Club domestic league appearances and goals

Albert Shepherd (10 September 1885 – 8 November 1929) was an English professional footballer who played as a forward. He began his career with amateur side Bolton Temperance before signing for First Division club Blackburn Rovers but was released a year later having made no appearances. He instead joined Second Division side Bolton Wanderers and was eventually handed his professional debut in 1904. Shepherd won promotion in his first full season with Bolton and the following year he finished as the top goalscorer in the First Division. His form led to call ups for the Football League representative XI and the England national football team, scoring on his debut for both sides in 1906.

He joined Newcastle United in 1908, winning the First Division title and becoming the first player for Newcastle to reach thirty goals in a single season during the 1909–10 season, including scoring both goals in the 1910 FA Cup Final during a 2–0 victory over Barnsley. He gained a second cap for England in 1911 before his career was halted after sustaining a serious knee injury that kept him out for over a year. After struggling to regain form after his return, he was sold to Bradford City where he spent one season before retiring. During his career, he scored over 150 goals in the Football League in 241 appearances.

== Early life ==
Shepherd was born at 10 South Street in Great Lever, Bolton, Lancashire. He was the third of three children of Thomas and Martha Shepherd and was baptised at St. Mark's Church on 31 March 1902. His father worked at a cotton mill as a mule spinner. Mules being the name for cotton spinning machinery as invented by Samuel Crompton of Bolton.

== Career ==
=== Bolton Wanderers ===
Shepherd was playing for local amateur club Bolton Temperance when he was offered an amateur contract with First Division side Blackburn Rovers in 1901. However, he was unable to break into the first team and was allowed to leave the club. He instead joined Bolton Wanderers but was allowed to play for amateur club Bolton St. Luke's in the Lancashire Combination before making his professional debut in November 1904.

In his first full season, he scored fifteen league goals to help Bolton finish second in the Second Division and gain promotion. He continued his scoring form in the First Division, netting 25 times as he finished as the league's top goalscorer, and was called up to the Football League representative side for a match against their Scottish counterparts. Played at Stamford Bridge, the match ended in a 6–2 victory for the English Football League with Shepherd scoring four times. The following month, he received his first call up for the England squad for a match against Scotland on 7 April 1906. England were reduced to ten men early in the match after Harry Makepeace was forced off with injury. Scotland took a 2–0 lead before Shepherd scored direct from a free-kick in the 81st minute, only the second time an English international player had scored a direct free-kick. Despite his goal, England were unable to regain a foothold in the match with Scotland winning 2–1.

=== Newcastle United ===
In November 1908, Shepherd signed for Newcastle United for a club record fee of £800, only £200 less than the British transfer record at the time. Signed as a replacement for Bill Appleyard, he made a goalscoring debut for the club during a 4–0 victory over Nottingham Forest but played in a 9–1 defeat to local rivals Sunderland in the following match, scoring Newcastle's only goal via a penalty. He went on to finish as the club's top goalscorer with fifteen league goals in his first season, helping the club win the First Division title. The following season, he became the first Newcastle player to score more than 30 goals in a single season, reaching 31, and he repeated the feat in the 1910–11 season when he finished as the top scorer in the First Division.

Shepherd scored both goals during a 2–0 win over Barnsley in the replay of the 1910 FA Cup Final to secure the club's first FA Cup victory. After giving Newcastle the lead with a low driving shot, he converted a penalty to become the first player to score a penalty in an FA Cup final. Newcastle reached the final again the following year, with Shepherd scoring eight times during the previous rounds and winning a second cap for England in a 2–1 victory over Ireland on 11 February 1911.

However, a serious injury sustained during a collision with a goalkeeper during a match against Blackburn Rovers ruled him out of the final, which Newcastle lost 1–0. Contesting a loose ball with Rovers goalkeeper Jimmy Ashcroft, when the pair made contact that resulted in Shepherd damaging ligaments and tearing muscles in his knee. The injury kept him out for over a year, missing the whole 1911–12 season and the start of the following year, and on his return he was unable to regain the goalscoring form he had shown before. He eventually left the club in July 1914, joining fellow First Division side Bradford City. He scored ten league goals in twenty-two appearances before he retired from professional football following the outbreak of World War I.

== Personal life ==
Shepherd married Mary Ellen Harwood on 29 May 1906 in Bolton. He died on 8 November 1929 at the Crown & Cushion Inn, a pub where he was licensee, in Bolton at the age of 44, leaving £705 and 12 shillings to his wife in his will. He was buried four days later at Christ Church, Walmsley with former Bolton players Joe Smith, Bert Baverstock, Ted Vizard, Billy Jennings, George Eccles and Jimmy Seddon as pallbearers.

== Honours ==
Newcastle United

- Football League First Division winner: 1908–09
- FA Cup winner: 1910
