= 2022–23 Newcastle United F.C. season =

Newcastle United
2022–23 season
- Owners: Public Investment Fund (80%); RB Sports & Media (10%); PCP Capital Partners (10%)
- Chairman: Yasir Al-Rumayyan
- Head coach: Eddie Howe
- Stadium: St James' Park
- Premier League: 4th
- FA Cup: Third round
- EFL Cup: Runners-up
- Top goalscorer: League: Callum Wilson (18); All: Callum Wilson (18)
- Highest home attendance: 52,758 vs Liverpool, Premier League, 18 February 2023
- Lowest home attendance: 51,579 vs Bournemouth, EFL Cup, 20 December 2022
- Average home league attendance: 52,127
- Biggest win: 6–1 vs Tottenham Hotspur, Premier League, 23 April 2023
- Biggest defeat: 0–3 vs Aston Villa, Premier League, 15 April 2023
Home colours	Away colours	Third colours

The 2022–23 season was the 130th season in the existence of Newcastle United and the club's sixth consecutive season in the Premier League. In addition to the league, they also competed in the FA Cup and EFL Cup, exiting in the third round of the former and losing to Manchester United in the final of the latter.

By finishing fourth in the Premier League standings, Newcastle qualified for the Champions League for the first time since the 2002–03 season and their first European competition since they made the Europa League in the 2011–12 season.

== Squad ==
Note: Flags indicate national team as has been defined under FIFA eligibility rules. Players may hold more than one non-FIFA nationality.

Squad no.	Name	Nationality	Position(s)	Date of birth (age)	Signed in	Previous club
Goalkeepers
1	Martin Dúbravka	(Slovakia)	GK	15 January 1989 (aged 34)	2018 (Note: Dúbravka signed on loan in January 2018, which turned into a permanent deal in May 2018.)	(Czech Republic) Sparta Prague
18	Loris Karius	(Germany)	GK	22 June 1993 (aged 30)	2022	(England) Liverpool
22	Nick Pope	(England)	GK	19 April 1992 (aged 31)	2022	(England) Burnley
29	Mark Gillespie	(England)	GK	27 March 1992 (aged 31)	2020	(Scotland) Motherwell
Defenders
2	Kieran Trippier	(England)	RB / LB	19 September 1990 (aged 32)	2022	(Spain) Atlético Madrid
3	Paul Dummett	(Wales) (Note: Dummett was born in Newcastle upon Tyne, England.)	CB / LB	26 September 1991 (aged 31)	2010	Academy
4	Sven Botman	(Netherlands)	CB	12 January 2000 (aged 23)	2022	(France) Lille
5	Fabian Schär	(Switzerland)	CB	20 December 1991 (aged 31)	2018	(Spain) Deportivo La Coruña
6	Jamaal Lascelles	(England)	CB	11 November 1993 (aged 29)	2014	(England) Nottingham Forest
12	Jamal Lewis	(Northern Ireland) (Note: Lewis was born in Luton, England.)	LB / LWB	25 January 1998 (aged 25)	2020	(England) Norwich City
13	Matt Targett	(England)	LB / LWB	18 September 1995 (aged 27)	2022 (Note: Targett signed on loan in January 2022, which turned into a permanent deal in June 2022.)	(England) Aston Villa
17	Emil Krafth	(Sweden)	RB / CB	2 August 1994 (aged 28)	2019	(France) Amiens
19	Javier Manquillo	(Spain)	RB / RWB / LB	5 May 1994 (aged 29)	2017	(Spain) Atlético Madrid
30	Harrison Ashby	(Scotland) (Note: Ashby was born in Milton Keynes, England.)	RB	14 November 2001 (aged 21)	2023	(England) West Ham United
33	Dan Burn	(England)	CB / LB	9 May 1992 (aged 31)	2022	(England) Brighton & Hove Albion
Midfielders
7	Joelinton	(Brazil)	CM / LW / ST	16 August 1996 (aged 26)	2019	(Germany) 1899 Hoffenheim
8	Anthony Gordon	(England)	LW / RW / AM / ST	24 February 2001 (aged 22)	2023	(England) Everton
10	Allan Saint-Maximin	(France)	LW / RW / ST	12 March 1997 (aged 26)	2019	(France) Nice
11	Matt Ritchie	(Scotland) (Note: Ritchie was born in Gosport, England.)	LW / LWB	10 September 1989 (aged 33)	2016	(England) Bournemouth
21	Ryan Fraser	(Scotland)	LW / RW / AM	24 February 1994 (aged 29)	2020	(England) Bournemouth
23	Jacob Murphy	(England)	RW / RWB / LW	24 February 1995 (aged 28)	2017	(England) Norwich City
24	Miguel Almirón	(Paraguay)	AM / RW / LW	10 February 1994 (aged 29)	2019	(United States) Atlanta United
27	Matty Longstaff	(England)	CM	21 March 2000 (aged 23)	2019	Academy
28	Joe Willock	(England)	CM / AM	20 August 1999 (aged 23)	2021	(England) Arsenal
32	Elliot Anderson	(Scotland) (Note: Anderson was born in Whitley Bay, England.)	AM / LW / RW / CM	6 November 2002 (aged 20)	2021	Academy
36	Sean Longstaff	(England)	CM	30 September 1997 (aged 25)	2016	Academy
39	Bruno Guimarães	(Brazil)	CM / DM	16 November 1997 (aged 25)	2022	(France) Lyon
81	Lewis Miley	(England)	CM / DM	1 May 2006 (aged 17)	2023	Academy
Forwards
9	Callum Wilson	(England)	ST	27 February 1992 (aged 31)	2020	(England) Bournemouth
14	Alexander Isak	(Sweden)	ST / LW	21 September 1999 (aged 23)	2022	(Spain) Real Sociedad
Out on Loan
20	Chris Wood	(New Zealand)	ST	7 December 1991 (aged 31)	2022	(England) Burnley
26	Karl Darlow	(England)	GK	8 October 1990 (aged 32)	2014	(England) Nottingham Forest
31	Kelland Watts	(England)	CB	3 November 1999 (aged 23)	2018	Academy
—	Ciaran Clark	(Republic of Ireland) (Note: Clark was born in Harrow, England.)	CB	26 September 1989 (aged 33)	2016	(England) Aston Villa
—	Isaac Hayden	(England)	CM / DM / CB	22 March 1995 (aged 28)	2016	(England) Arsenal
—	Jeff Hendrick	(Republic of Ireland)	CM	31 January 1992 (aged 31)	2020	(England) Burnley
—	Garang Kuol	(Australia) (Note: Kuol was born in Cairo, Egypt.)	LW / RW / ST	15 September 2004 (aged 18)	2023	(Australia) Central Coast Mariners

== Kits ==
Home	Home alt.	Home alt. 2	Away	Away alt. 1	Away alt. 2	Third	Third alt. 1	Third alt. 2	Fourth

== Transfers ==
=== Transfers in ===
Date	Position	Nationality	Player	From	Fee	Ref.
10 June 2022 (Note: The transfer was announced on 28 May 2022, and would become official on 10 June 2022 once the transfer window opened.)	CB	(Republic of Ireland)	Alex Murphy	(Republic of Ireland) Galway United	Undisclosed	
10 June 2022 (Note: The transfer was announced on 8 June 2022, and would become official on 10 June 2022 once the transfer window opened.)	LB	(England)	Matt Targett	(England) Aston Villa	£15,000,000	
23 June 2022	GK	(England)	Nick Pope	(England) Burnley	£10,000,000	
1 July 2022	CB	(Netherlands)	Sven Botman	(France) Lille	£35,000,000	
4 July 2022	LB	(England)	Jordan Hackett	(England) Tottenham Hotspur	Free transfer	
6 July 2022	CB	(Scotland)	Charlie McArthur	(Scotland) Kilmarnock	Undisclosed	
12 August 2022	GK	(Scotland)	Jude Smith	(Scotland) East Fife	Undisclosed	
26 August 2022	ST	(Sweden)	Alexander Isak	(Spain) Real Sociedad	£63,000,000	
11 September 2022	GK	(Germany)	Loris Karius	(England) Liverpool	Free transfer	
17 October 2022	LW	(England)	Amadou Diallo	(England) West Ham United	Free transfer	
1 January 2023 (Note: The transfer was announced on 30 September 2022, and would become official on 1 January 2023 once the transfer window opened.)	LW	(Australia)	Garang Kuol	(Australia) Central Coast Mariners	£300,000	
29 January 2023	LW	(England)	Anthony Gordon	(England) Everton	£45,000,000	
31 January 2023	RB	(Scotland)	Harrison Ashby	(England) West Ham United	£3,000,000	

=== Loans out ===
Date from	Position	Nationality	Player	To	Date until	Ref.
10 June 2022 (Note: The loan agreement was announced on 7 June 2022, and would become official on 10 June 2022 once the transfer window opened.)	DM	(England)	Isaac Hayden	(England) Norwich City	End of Season	
2 July 2022	GK	(England)	Dan Langley	(England) Gateshead	5 January 2023 (Note: On 5 January, Dan Langley returned from his loan spell at Gateshead. His loan was originally due to expire at the end of the season.)	
12 July 2022	CM	(Republic of Ireland)	Jeff Hendrick	(England) Reading	End of Season	
13 July 2022	CB	(Republic of Ireland)	Ciaran Clark	(England) Sheffield United	End of Season	
1 September 2022	CM	(Scotland)	Lucas De Bolle	(Scotland) Hamilton Academical	End of Season	
1 September 2022	GK	(Slovakia)	Martin Dúbravka	(England) Manchester United	1 January 2023 (Note: On 1 January, Martin Dúbravka returned from his loan spell at Manchester United. His loan was originally due to expire at the end of the season.)	
1 September 2022	CM	(England)	Matty Longstaff	(England) Colchester United	1 January 2023	
1 September 2022	CB	(England)	Kelland Watts	(England) Peterborough United	End of Season (Note: On 6 January, Kelland Watts extended his loan spell at Peterborough United until the end of the season. His loan was originally due to expire on 1 January 2023.)	
5 January 2023	GK	(England)	Dan Langley	(England) Spennymoor Town	End of Season	
6 January 2023	AM	(England)	Joe White	(England) Exeter City	End of Season	
12 January 2023	LW	(Australia)	Garang Kuol	(Scotland) Heart of Midlothian	End of Season	
20 January 2023	CF	(New Zealand)	Chris Wood	(England) Nottingham Forest	End of Season	
26 January 2023	CF	(England)	Dylan Stephenson	(Scotland) Hamilton Academical	End of Season	
30 January 2023	DM	(England)	Niall Brookwell	(England) Darlington	End of Season	
31 January 2023	GK	(England)	Karl Darlow	(England) Hull City	End of Season	
31 January 2023	AM	(England)	Jay Turner-Cooke	(England) Tranmere Rovers	End of Season	

=== Transfers out ===
Date	Position	Nationality	Player	To	Fee	Ref.
11 June 2022	CB	(England)	Lewis Cass	(England) Port Vale	Free transfer	
21 June 2022	GK	(England)	Freddie Woodman	(England) Preston North End	Undisclosed	
22 July 2022	ST	(England)	Dwight Gayle	(England) Stoke City	Free transfer	
1 September 2022	CB	(Argentina)	Federico Fernández	(Spain) Elche	Undisclosed	
31 January 2023	CM	(England)	Jonjo Shelvey	(England) Nottingham Forest	Undisclosed	

=== Released ===
Date	Position	Nationality	Player	To	Notes	Ref.
1 July 2022	RW	(England)	Thomas Allan	(England) Gateshead	End of Contract	
1 July 2022	GK	(Poland)	Piotr Banda	(England) Bishop Auckland	End of Contract	
1 July 2022	RB	(Wales)	Ryan Barrett		End of Contract	
1 July 2022	MF	(England)	Liam Chrystal		End of Contract	
1 July 2022	CB	(South Africa)	Bradley Cross		End of Contract	
1 July 2022	LB	(Wales)	Joel Green	(England) Newcastle Benfield	End of Contract	
1 July 2022	CB	(Republic of Ireland)	Oisin McEntee	(England) Walsall	End of Contract	
1 July 2022	CB	(England)	Josh Nicholson		End of Contract	
1 July 2022	DM	(England)	Nathan Robertson		End of Contract	
1 July 2022	CM	(Liberia)	Mohammed Sangare	(England) Accrington Stanley	End of Contract	
1 July 2022	CM	(Scotland)	Reagan Thomson	(Scotland) Hamilton Academical	End of Contract	
1 July 2022	GK	(England)	Jake Turner	(England) Gillingham	End of Contract	
1 July 2022	LM	(England)	Adam Wilson	(Wales) The New Saints	End of Contract	

== Pre-season and friendlies ==
Newcastle United confirmed they would play friendly matches against Gateshead, 1860 Munich, Mainz 05, Benfica, Atalanta, and Athletic Bilbao as part of their pre-season schedule. Whilst Newcastle United were in Lisbon for their training camp, they played two training matches against Burnley behind closed doors.

On 21 October 2022, Newcastle United announced that the first team squad would return to Saudi Arabia for a warm-weather training camp when the Premier League season pauses for the 2022 FIFA World Cup. As part of that visit, it was also confirmed that Newcastle United would play a friendly match against Saudi Professional League side Al Hilal on 8 December 2022. Newcastle United also confirmed they would play a friendly match against Rayo Vallecano on 17 December 2022 before the Premier League season restarts after the 2022 FIFA World Cup.

Win Draw Loss Fixtures

9 July 2022 Friendly	Newcastle United	5–1	Gateshead	Newcastle upon Tyne
11:30 BST	Ritchie 31'; Joelinton 48' (pen.); Almirón 80', 89'; S. Longstaff 90'	Report	Blackett 66'	Stadium: Darsley Park; Attendance: 0

15 July 2022 Friendly	1860 Munich	0–3	Newcastle United	Saalfelden
18:00 CET		Report	Lascelles (yellow card) 27'; Willock 55'; S. Longstaff 63'; Joelinton (yellow card) 70'; Bruno Guimarães 76'	Stadium: Saalfelden Arena; Attendance: 600; Referee: Reuf Salihovic (Austria)

18 July 2022 Friendly	Mainz 05	1–0	Newcastle United	Kufstein
17:00 CET	Burgzorg 58'; Papela (yellow card) 74'	Report		Stadium: Kufstein Arena; Attendance: 500; Referee: Patrick Elsier (Austria)

23 July 2022 Friendly	Newcastle United	6–1	Burnley	Lisbon
	Willock; Anderson; Almirón; Ritchie; Murphy	Report	Tucker (pen.)	Stadium: Cidade do Futebol; Attendance: 0

23 July 2022 Friendly	Newcastle United	3–1	Burnley	Lisbon
	Saint-Maximin; Wilson; Almirón	Report	Maatsen	Stadium: Cidade do Futebol; Attendance: 0

26 July 2022 Eusébio Cup	Benfica	3–2	Newcastle United	Lisbon
20:00 WEST	Ramos 15'; João Mário (yellow card) 20'; Grimaldo 32'; Araújo 89'	Report	Bruno Guimarães (yellow card) 11'; Almirón 22', 44'; Burn (yellow card) 72'; Joelinton (yellow card) 79' (yellow-red card) 82'	Stadium: Estádio da Luz; Attendance: 49,081; Referee: Nuno Almeida (Portugal)

29 July 2022 Friendly	Newcastle United	1–0	Atalanta	Newcastle upon Tyne
19:45 BST	Wood 37' (pen.)	Report		Stadium: St James' Park; Attendance: 40,596; Referee: Peter Bankes (England)

30 July 2022 Friendly	Newcastle United	2–1	Athletic Bilbao	Newcastle upon Tyne
15:00 BST	Wilson 4'; Saint-Maximin 54'	Report	R. García 64'	Stadium: St James' Park; Attendance: 46,856; Referee: Jarred Gillett (England)

8 December 2022 Diriyah Season Cup	Al Hilal	0–5	Newcastle United	Riyadh
17:00 GMT		Report	Joelinton 7', 43'; Almirón 76', 81'; Stephenson 87'	Stadium: Prince Faisal bin Fahd Stadium

17 December 2022 Friendly	Newcastle United	2–1	Rayo Vallecano	Newcastle upon Tyne
12:30 GMT	Longstaff 4'; Wood 69' (pen.)	Report	Targett 75' (o.g.)	Stadium: St James' Park; Attendance: 34,956; Referee: Tom Bramall (England)

== Competitions ==
=== Overall record ===
Competition	First match	Last match	Starting round	Final position	Record							
Competition	First match	Last match	Starting round	Final position	Pld	W	D	L	GF	GA	GD	Win %
Premier League	6 August 2022	28 May 2023	Matchday 1	4th	38	19	14	5	68	33	+35	50.00
FA Cup	7 January 2023		Third round	Third round	1	0	0	1	1	2	−1	0.00
EFL Cup	24 August 2022	26 February 2023	Second round	Runners-up	7	5	1	1	8	4	+4	71.43
Total					46	24	15	7	77	39	+38	52.17

Source: Soccerway

=== Premier League ===
==== League table ====
Pos	Team	Pld	W	D	L	GF	GA	GD	Pts	Qualification or relegation
2	Arsenal	38	26	6	6	88	43	+45	84	Qualification to Champions League group stage
3	Manchester United	38	23	6	9	58	43	+15	75	Qualification to Champions League group stage
4	Newcastle United	38	19	14	5	68	33	+35	71	Qualification to Champions League group stage
5	Liverpool	38	19	10	9	75	47	+28	67	Qualification to Europa League group stage (Note: Since the winners of the 2022–23 FA Cup, Manchester City, qualified for the Champions League, the spot given to the FA Cup winners (Europa League group stage) was passed to the sixth-placed team.)
6	Brighton & Hove Albion	38	18	8	12	72	53	+19	62	Qualification to Europa League group stage

Source: Premier League
Rules for classification: 1) Points; 2) Goal difference; 3) Goals scored; 4) If the champions, relegated teams or qualified teams for UEFA competitions cannot be determined by rules 1 to 3, rules 4.1 to 4.3 are applied – 4.1) Points gained in head-to-head record between such teams; 4.2) Away goals scored in head-to-head record between such teams; 4.3) Play-offs

==== Results summary ====
Overall								Home						Away					
Pld	W	D	L	GF	GA	GD	Pts	W	D	L	GF	GA	GD	W	D	L	GF	GA	GD
38	19	14	5	68	33	+35	71	11	6	2	36	14	+22	8	8	3	32	19	+13

Source: Premier League

==== Results by round ====
Round	1	2	3	4	5	6	8	9	10	11	12	13	14	15	16	17	18	19	20	21	22	23	24	26	27	28	29	7^{1}	30	31	32	33	34	35	36	25^{2}	37	38
Ground	H	A	H	A	A	H	H	A	H	A	H	A	H	A	H	A	H	A	H	A	H	A	H	A	H	A	H	A	A	A	H	A	H	H	A	H	H	A
Result	W	D	D	D	L	D	D	W	W	D	W	W	W	W	W	W	D	D	W	D	D	D	L	L	W	W	W	W	W	L	W	W	W	L	D	W	D	D
Position	5	5	6	7	12	11	10	7	6	6	6	4	4	3	3	3	3	3	3	3	4	4	5	6	5	5	3	3	3	4	3	3	3	3	3	3	4	4
Points	3	4	5	6	6	7	8	11	14	15	18	21	24	27	30	33	34	35	38	39	40	41	41	41	44	47	50	53	56	56	59	62	65	65	66	69	70	71

Source: Premier League
A = Away; H = Home; W = Win; D = Draw; L = Loss; P = Postponed
Notes:
- ^{1} Matchday 7 (vs. West Ham United) was postponed, alongside all other matches in the Premier League, due to the passing of Queen Elizabeth II.
- ^{2} Matchday 25 (vs. Brighton & Hove Albion) was postponed due to Newcastle United participating in the EFL Cup Final.

==== Matches ====
Win Draw Loss Fixtures

On 16 June, the Premier League fixtures were released.

6 August 2022 1	Newcastle United	2–0	Nottingham Forest	Newcastle upon Tyne
15:00 BST	Schär 58'; Wilson 78'	Report	Worrall (yellow card) 15'; Williams (yellow card) 23'; O'Brien (yellow card) 56'	Stadium: St James' Park; Attendance: 52,245 (3,209 away); Referee: Simon Hooper

13 August 2022 2	Brighton & Hove Albion	0–0	Newcastle United	Falmer
15:00 BST	Mac Allister (yellow card) 34'; March (yellow card) 58'	Report	Saint-Maximin (yellow card) 22'; Joelinton (yellow card) 58'; Schär (yellow card) 90+3'	Stadium: Falmer Stadium; Attendance: 31,552 (3,100 away); Referee: Graham Scott

21 August 2022 3	Newcastle United	3–3	Manchester City	Newcastle upon Tyne
16:30 BST	Bruno Guimarães (yellow card) 8'; Almirón 28'; Schär (yellow card) 34'; Wilson 39'; Trippier 54', (yellow card) 76'; Joelinton (yellow card) 90+2'	Report	Gündoğan 5'; Cancelo (yellow card) 18'; Stones (yellow card) 52'; Haaland 60'; Silva 64'	Stadium: St James' Park; Attendance: 52,258 (3,209 away); Referee: Jarred Gillett
Note: Live on Sky Sports

28 August 2022 4	Wolverhampton Wanderers	1–1	Newcastle United	Wolverhampton
14:00 BST	Semedo (yellow card) 28'; Neves 38'; Neto (yellow card) 58'	Report	Schär (yellow card) 46'; Saint-Maximin 90'	Stadium: Molineux; Attendance: 31,429 (2,956 away); Referee: Peter Bankes
Note: Live on Sky Sports

31 August 2022 5	Liverpool	2–1	Newcastle United	Liverpool
20:00 BST	Firmino 61'; Carvalho 90+8'	Report	Isak 38'; Lascelles (yellow card) 87'; Trippier (yellow card) 90'	Stadium: Anfield; Attendance: 53,316 (3,000 away); Referee: Andre Marriner
Note: Live on BT Sport

3 September 2022 6	Newcastle United	0–0	Crystal Palace	Newcastle upon Tyne
15:00 BST	Longstaff (yellow card) 15'; Fraser (yellow card) 67'	Report	Ward (yellow card) 56'	Stadium: St James' Park; Attendance: 51,863 (1,466 away); Referee: Michael Salisbury

17 September 2022 8	Newcastle United	1–1	Bournemouth	Newcastle upon Tyne
15:00 BST	Isak 67' (pen.); Joelinton (yellow card) 69'; Burn (yellow card) 90+7'	Report	Christie (yellow card) 34'; Tavernier (yellow card) 45+3'; Billing 62'	Stadium: St James' Park; Attendance: 52,238 (1,155 away); Referee: Craig Pawson

1 October 2022 9	Fulham	1–4	Newcastle United	Fulham
15:00 BST	Chalobah (red card) 8'; Mitrović (yellow card) 12'; Reed (yellow card) 54'; Decordova-Reid 88'	Report	Wilson 11'; Almirón 33', 57'; Longstaff 43'	Stadium: Craven Cottage; Attendance: 22,913 (2,300 away); Referee: Darren England

8 October 2022 10	Newcastle United	5–1	Brentford	Newcastle upon Tyne
15:00 BST	Bruno Guimarães 21', 56'; Murphy 28'; Almirón 82'; Pinnock 90' (o.g.)	Report	Toney (yellow card) 45+1', (goal) 54' (pen.)	Stadium: St James' Park; Attendance: 52,067 (2,097 away); Referee: John Brooks

16 October 2022 11	Manchester United	0–0	Newcastle United	Manchester
14:00 BST	Ronaldo (yellow card) 49'; Fernandes (yellow card) 65'; Casemiro (yellow card) 69'	Report	Burn (yellow card) 43'	Stadium: Old Trafford; Attendance: 73,726 (3,100 away); Referee: Craig Pawson

19 October 2022 12	Newcastle United	1–0	Everton	Newcastle upon Tyne
19:30 BST	Joelinton (yellow card) 24'; Almirón 30'; Schär (yellow card) 44'	Report	Calvert-Lewin (yellow card) 7'; Gordon (yellow card) 44'; Gueye (yellow card) 64'; Tarkowski (yellow card) 89'	Stadium: St James' Park; Attendance: 52,204 (3,209 away); Referee: Tony Harrington
Note: Live on Amazon Prime Video

23 October 2022 13	Tottenham Hotspur	1–2	Newcastle United	Tottenham
16:30 BST	Bentancur (yellow card) 31'; Kane 54'; Sessegnon (yellow card) 59'; Skipp (yellow card) 66'; Emerson (yellow card) 90'	Report	Wilson 31', (yellow card) 68'; Almirón 40'; Pope (yellow card) 84'	Stadium: Tottenham Hotspur Stadium; Attendance: 61,726 (3,000 away); Referee: Jarred Gillett
Note: Live on Sky Sports

29 October 2022 14	Newcastle United	4–0	Aston Villa	Newcastle upon Tyne
15:00 BST	Wilson 45+6' (pen.), 56'; Joelinton 59', (yellow card) 65'; Almirón 67'	Report	Watkins (yellow card) 45+5'	Stadium: St James' Park; Attendance: 52,233 (3,209 away); Referee: Paul Tierney

6 November 2022 15	Southampton	1–4	Newcastle United	Southampton
14:00 GMT	Lavia (yellow card) 75'; Perraud 89'	Report	Almirón 35'; Wood 58'; Willock 62'; Bruno Guimarães 90+1'	Stadium: St Mary's Stadium; Attendance: 30,402 (3,200 away); Referee: Stuart Attwell
Note: Live on Sky Sports

12 November 2022 16	Newcastle United	1–0	Chelsea	Newcastle upon Tyne
17:30 GMT	Trippier (yellow card) 56'; Willock 67'; Pope (yellow card) 90+5'; Longstaff (yellow card) 90+8'; Lascelles (yellow card) 90+9'	Report	Jorginho (yellow card) 30'; Koulibaly (yellow card) 89'	Stadium: St James' Park; Attendance: 52,264 (3,205 away); Referee: Robert Jones
Note: Live on Sky Sports

26 December 2022 17	Leicester City	0–3	Newcastle United	Leicester
15:00 GMT		Report	Wood 3' (pen.); Almirón 7'; Joelinton 32'	Stadium: King Power Stadium; Attendance: 32,185 (3,300 away); Referee: Jarred Gillett
Note: Live on Amazon Prime Video

31 December 2022 18	Newcastle United	0–0	Leeds United	Newcastle upon Tyne
15:00 GMT	Trippier (yellow card) 42'; Wilson (yellow card) 90+4'; Bruno Guimarães (yellow card) 90+5'	Report	Ayling (yellow card) 45+1'; Struijk (yellow card) 59'; Roca (yellow card) 64'; Gnonto (yellow card) 67'; Meslier (yellow card) 90+5'	Stadium: St James' Park; Attendance: 52,211 (2,847 away); Referee: Simon Hooper

3 January 2023 19	Arsenal	0–0	Newcastle United	Holloway
19:45 GMT	Nketiah (yellow card) 32'; Ødegaard (yellow card) 40'; Xhaka (yellow card) 42'; Zinchenko (yellow card) 90+6'	Report	Bruno Guimarães (yellow card) 27'; Wilson (yellow card) 28'; Joelinton (yellow card) 58'; Almirón (yellow card) 59'; Lascelles (yellow card) 90+7'	Stadium: Emirates Stadium; Attendance: 60,319 (3,000 away); Referee: Andrew Madley
Note: Live on Sky Sports

15 January 2023 20	Newcastle United	1–0	Fulham	Newcastle upon Tyne
14:00 GMT	Pope (yellow card) 69'; Isak 89'	Report	Kurzawa (yellow card) 48'; Ream (yellow card) 60'; Pereira (yellow card) 63'; Mitrović (penalty missed) 69'	Stadium: St James' Park; Attendance: 52,247 (1,650 away); Referee: Robert Jones
Note: Live on Sky Sports

21 January 2023 21	Crystal Palace	0–0	Newcastle United	Selhurst
17:30 GMT	Guéhi (yellow card) 4'; Hughes (yellow card) 75'; Doucouré (yellow card) 87'; Olise (yellow card) 90+4'	Report	Trippier (yellow card) 57'; Joelinton (yellow card) 90+4'	Stadium: Selhurst Park; Attendance: 25,350 (2,650 away); Referee: Craig Pawson
Note: Live on Sky Sports

4 February 2023 22	Newcastle United	1–1	West Ham United	Newcastle upon Tyne
17:30 GMT	Wilson 3'; Willock (yellow card) 45'; Joelinton (yellow card) 57'	Report	Paquetá 32'; Aguerd (yellow card) 90+1'	Stadium: St James' Park; Attendance: 52,256 (3,209 away); Referee: Peter Bankes
Note: Live on Sky Sports

11 February 2023 23	Bournemouth	1–1	Newcastle United	Bournemouth
17:30 GMT	Senesi 30'; Smith (yellow card) 74'; Stephens (yellow card) 90+7'	Report	Almirón 45+2'; Gordon (yellow card) 60'; Botman (yellow card) 87'; Joelinton (yellow card) 90+4'	Stadium: Vitality Stadium; Attendance: 10,419 (1,300 away); Referee: Stuart Attwell
Note: Live on Sky Sports

18 February 2023 24	Newcastle United	0–2	Liverpool	Newcastle upon Tyne
17:30 GMT	Pope (red card) 22'; Almirón (yellow card) 37'	Report	Núñez 10'; Gakpo 17'; Fabinho (yellow card) 20'	Stadium: St James' Park; Attendance: 52,758 (3,209 away); Referee: Anthony Taylor
Note: Live on Sky Sports

4 March 2023 26	Manchester City	2–0	Newcastle United	Manchester
12:30 GMT	Foden 15'; Aké (yellow card) 58'; Silva 67'; Haaland (yellow card) 74'	Report	Joelinton (yellow card) 53'; Burn (yellow card) 74'; Bruno Guimarães (yellow card) 76'; Lascelles (yellow card) 90+1'	Stadium: Etihad Stadium; Attendance: 53,419 (3,000 away); Referee: Simon Hooper
Note: Live on BT Sport

12 March 2023 27	Newcastle United	2–1	Wolverhampton Wanderers	Newcastle upon Tyne
16:30 GMT	Isak 26', (yellow card) 68'; Almirón 79'	Report	Podence (yellow card) 44'; Semedo (yellow card) 58'; Hwang 70'	Stadium: St James' Park; Attendance: 52,240 (2,738 away); Referee: Andrew Madley
Note: Live on Sky Sports

17 March 2023 28	Nottingham Forest	1–2	Newcastle United	West Bridgford
20:00 GMT	Dennis (yellow card) 22', (goal) 26'; Gibbs-White (yellow card) 59'; Shelvey (yellow card) 90+2'; Navas (yellow card) 90+3'; Lodi (yellow card) 90+6'	Report	Burn (yellow card) 33'; Isak 45+2', 90+3' (pen.)	Stadium: City Ground; Attendance: 29,362 (2,956 away); Referee: Paul Tierney
Note: Live on Sky Sports

2 April 2023 29	Newcastle United	2–0	Manchester United	Newcastle upon Tyne
16:30 BST	Willock 65'; Wilson 88'	Report		Stadium: St James' Park; Attendance: 52,268 (3,014 away); Referee: Stuart Attwell
Note: Live on Sky Sports

5 April 2023 7	West Ham United	1–5	Newcastle United	Stratford
20:00 BST	Zouma 40'; Emerson (yellow card) 42'; Downes (yellow card) 88'	Report	Wilson 6', 46'; Joelinton 13', 90', (yellow card) 52'; Isak 82'	Stadium: London Stadium; Attendance: 62,470 (3,000 away); Referee: Craig Pawson
Note: Live on Sky Sports. The match was originally scheduled for 11 September 2022, but was included in the league-wide postponement due to the death of Queen Elizabeth II.

8 April 2023 30	Brentford	1–2	Newcastle United	Brentford
15:00 BST	Toney (penalty missed) 29', 45+1' (pen.)	Report	Botman (yellow card) 28'; Raya 53' (o.g.); Isak 61', (yellow card) 87'	Stadium: Brentford Community Stadium; Attendance: 17,107 (1,700 away); Referee: Chris Kavanagh

15 April 2023 31	Aston Villa	3–0	Newcastle United	Aston
12:30 BST	Ramsey 11'; Watkins 63', 83'; Durán (yellow card) 90+3'	Report	Schär (yellow card) 22'	Stadium: Villa Park; Attendance: 42,055 (3,000 away); Referee: John Brooks
Note: Live on BT Sport

23 April 2023 32	Newcastle United	6–1	Tottenham Hotspur	Newcastle upon Tyne
14:00 BST	Murphy 2', 9'; Joelinton 6'; Isak 19', 21'; Wilson 67'	Report	Kulusevski (yellow card) 28'; Skipp (yellow card) 34'; Kane 49'; Romero (yellow card) 74'	Stadium: St James' Park; Attendance: 52,252 (3,209 away); Referee: David Coote
Note: Live on Sky Sports

27 April 2023 33	Everton	1–4	Newcastle United	Walton
19:45 BST	Onana (yellow card) 40'; McNeil 80'; Maupay (yellow card) 90+5'	Report	Wilson 28', 75'; Targett (yellow card) 53'; Joelinton 72'; Murphy 81'	Stadium: Goodison Park; Attendance: 39,248 (2,972 away); Referee: Andre Marriner
Note: Live on BT Sport

30 April 2023 34	Newcastle United	3–1	Southampton	Newcastle upon Tyne
14:00 BST	Wilson 54', 81'; Walcott 79' (o.g.); Joelinton (yellow card) 79'	Report	Bednarek (yellow card) 4'; S. Armstrong 41', (yellow card) 71'; Walker-Peters (yellow card) 56'; Lavia (yellow card) 72'	Stadium: St James' Park; Attendance: 52,234 (1,538 away); Referee: Anthony Taylor

7 May 2023 35	Newcastle United	0–2	Arsenal	Newcastle upon Tyne
16:30 BST	Burn (yellow card) 73'; Schär (yellow card) 90+6'	Report	Ødegaard 14'; Schär 71' (o.g.); Nketiah (yellow card) 90+6'	Stadium: St James' Park; Attendance: 52,267 (3,209 away); Referee: Chris Kavanagh
Note: Live on Sky Sports

13 May 2023 36	Leeds United	2–2	Newcastle United	Leeds
12:30 BST	Ayling 7'; Bamford (penalty missed) 28', (yellow card) 90+2'; Firpo (yellow card) 59', (red card) 90+1'; Gnonto (yellow card) 68'; Robles (yellow card) 69'; Kristensen 79'	Report	Wilson 31' (pen.), 69' (pen.), (yellow card) 72'; Bruno Guimarães (yellow card) 57'	Stadium: Elland Road; Attendance: 36,955 (2,900 away); Referee: Simon Hooper
Note: Live on BT Sport

18 May 2023 25	Newcastle United	4–1	Brighton & Hove Albion	Newcastle upon Tyne
19:30 BST	Undav 22' (o.g.); Bruno Guimarães (yellow card) 30', (goal) 90+1'; Schär (yellow card) 45+4'; Burn 45+4'; Wilson 89'	Report	Undav (yellow card) 45+2', (goal) 51'; Groß (yellow card) 57'; Mac Allister (yellow card) 64'; Van Hecke (yellow card) 81'	Stadium: St James' Park; Attendance: 52,122 (1,091 away); Referee: Robert Jones
Note: Live on Sky Sports. The match was originally scheduled for 25 February 2023, but was postponed due to Newcastle United's participation in the EFL Cup final.

22 May 2023 37	Newcastle United	0–0	Leicester City	Newcastle upon Tyne
20:00 BST	Bruno Guimarães (yellow card) 9'; Isak (yellow card) 27'	Report		Stadium: St James' Park; Attendance: 52,152 (1,237 away); Referee: Andre Marriner
Note: Live on Sky Sports

28 May 2023 38	Chelsea	1–1	Newcastle United	Fulham
16:30 BST	Trippier 27' (o.g.)	Report	Gordon 9'	Stadium: Stamford Bridge; Attendance: 40,130; Referee: Jarred Gillett

=== FA Cup ===
The Magpies entered the FA Cup in the third round, and were drawn away to Sheffield Wednesday.

Win Draw Loss Fixtures

7 January 2023 Third round	Sheffield Wednesday	2–1	Newcastle United	Owlerton
18:00 GMT	Dele-Bashiru (yellow card) 45+1'; Windass 52', 65'	Report	Bruno Guimarães 69'	Stadium: Hillsborough; Attendance: 25,884; Referee: Michael Salisbury
Note: Live on BBC Sport

=== EFL Cup ===
The Magpies entered the EFL Cup in the second round, and were drawn away to Tranmere Rovers. They were then drawn at home to Crystal Palace in the third round, Bournemouth in the fourth round and Leicester City in the quarter-finals. Newcastle were then drawn against Southampton in the semi-finals. The Magpies advanced to the final, where they played against Manchester United.

Win Draw Loss Fixtures

24 August 2022 Second round	Tranmere Rovers	1–2	Newcastle United	Birkenhead
19:45 BST	Nevitt 21'; Hemmings (yellow card) 45+4'	Report	Lascelles 40'; Wood 52'	Stadium: Prenton Park; Attendance: 10,961; Referee: Anthony Backhouse
Note: Live on Sky Sports

9 November 2022 Third round	Newcastle United	0–0 (3–2 p)	Crystal Palace	Newcastle upon Tyne
19:45 GMT	Anderson (yellow card) 39'	Report	Milivojević (yellow card) 42'; Hughes (yellow card) 90+2'	Stadium: St James' Park; Attendance: 51,660; Referee: Graham Scott
	Penalties
	Wood (penalty scored); Trippier (penalty scored); Joelinton (penalty scored); Botman (penalty missed); Bruno Guimarães (penalty missed)		(penalty missed) Milivojević; (penalty scored) Hughes; (penalty scored) Ward; (penalty missed) Mateta; (penalty missed) Ebiowei

20 December 2022 Fourth round	Newcastle United	1–0	Bournemouth	Newcastle upon Tyne
19:45 GMT	Smith 67' (o.g.); Trippier (yellow card) 69'	Report	Cook (yellow card) 47'	Stadium: St James' Park; Attendance: 51,579; Referee: John Brooks

10 January 2023 Quarter-finals	Newcastle United	2–0	Leicester City	Newcastle upon Tyne
20:00 GMT	Longstaff (yellow card) 37'; Burn (yellow card) 38', (goal) 60'; Joelinton 72'; Botman (yellow card) 81'	Report	Pérez (yellow card) 62'; Ndidi (yellow card) 67'	Stadium: St James' Park; Attendance: 52,009; Referee: Darren England
Note: Live on Sky Sports

24 January 2023 Semi-finals First leg	Southampton	0–1	Newcastle United	Southampton
20:00 GMT	Ćaleta-Car (yellow card) 28' (yellow-red card) 86'; Alcaraz (yellow card) 37'; Walker-Peters (yellow card) 44'; Lyanco (yellow card) 84'; Salisu (yellow card) 90+6'	Report	Trippier (yellow card) 70'; Joelinton 73'; Saint-Maximin (yellow card) 84'; Bruno Guimarães (yellow card) 86'	Stadium: St Mary's Stadium; Attendance: 30,090; Referee: Stuart Attwell
Note: Live on Sky Sports

31 January 2023 Semi-finals Second leg	Newcastle United	2–1 (3–1 agg.)	Southampton	Newcastle upon Tyne
20:00 GMT	Longstaff 5', 21'; Bruno Guimarães (red card) 82'	Report	Adams 29'	Stadium: St James' Park; Attendance: 51,975; Referee: Paul Tierney
Note: Live on Sky Sports

26 February 2023 Final	Manchester United	2–0	Newcastle United	Wembley
16:30 GMT	Dalot (yellow card) 9'; Casemiro 33', (yellow card) 87'; Fred (yellow card) 37'; Rashford 39'; De Gea (yellow card) 84'; Shaw (yellow card) 90+1'; Martínez (yellow card) 90+6'	Report	Joelinton (yellow card) 45+6'; Botman (yellow card) 67'; Schär (yellow card) 90+6'	Stadium: Wembley Stadium; Attendance: 87,306; Referee: David Coote
Note: Live on Sky Sports

== Statistics ==
=== Appearances and goals ===
Last updated on 28 May 2023.

No.	Pos	Nat	Player	Total		Premier League		FA Cup		EFL Cup	
No.	Pos	Nat	Player	Apps	Goals	Apps	Goals	Apps	Goals	Apps	Goals
Goalkeepers
1	GK	(Slovakia) SVK	Martin Dúbravka	3	0	1+1	0	1	0	0	0
18	GK	(Germany) GER	Loris Karius	1	0	0	0	0	0	1	0
22	GK	(England) ENG	Nick Pope	42	0	37	0	0	0	5	0
Defenders
2	DF	(England) ENG	Kieran Trippier	46	1	38	1	0+1	0	5+2	0
3	DF	(Wales) WAL	Paul Dummett	1	0	0	0	0	0	1	0
4	DF	(Netherlands) NED	Sven Botman	44	0	35+1	0	1	0	5+2	0
5	DF	(Switzerland) SUI	Fabian Schär	41	1	36	1	0	0	5	0
6	DF	(England) ENG	Jamaal Lascelles	11	1	2+5	0	1	0	2+1	1
12	DF	(Northern Ireland) NIR	Jamal Lewis	4	0	0+2	0	1	0	0+1	0
13	DF	(England) ENG	Matt Targett	19	0	6+11	0	0	0	2	0
17	DF	(Sweden) SWE	Emil Krafth	2	0	0+1	0	0	0	1	0
19	DF	(Spain) ESP	Javier Manquillo	6	0	0+4	0	1	0	1	0
33	DF	(England) ENG	Dan Burn	44	2	35+3	1	0	0	6	1
Midfielders
7	MF	(Brazil) BRA	Joelinton	40	8	30+2	6	1	0	6+1	2
8	MF	(England) ENG	Anthony Gordon	16	1	4+12	1	0	0	0	0
10	MF	(France) FRA	Allan Saint-Maximin	31	1	12+13	1	0	0	2+4	0
11	MF	(Scotland) SCO	Matt Ritchie	10	0	0+7	0	1	0	1+1	0
21	MF	(Scotland) SCO	Ryan Fraser	8	0	3+5	0	0	0	0	0
23	MF	(England) ENG	Jacob Murphy	43	4	14+22	4	1	0	1+5	0
24	MF	(Paraguay) PAR	Miguel Almirón	41	11	29+5	11	0+1	0	5+1	0
28	MF	(England) ENG	Joe Willock	43	3	31+4	3	0+1	0	5+2	0
32	MF	(Scotland) SCO	Elliot Anderson	27	0	3+19	0	1	0	2+2	0
36	MF	(England) ENG	Sean Longstaff	41	3	28+5	1	1	0	7	2
39	MF	(Brazil) BRA	Bruno Guimarães	40	5	32	4	0+1	1	5+2	0
81	MF	(England) ENG	Lewis Miley	1	0	0+1	0	0	0	0	0
Forwards
9	FW	(England) ENG	Callum Wilson	36	18	21+10	18	0	0	5	0
14	FW	(Sweden) SWE	Alexander Isak	27	10	17+5	10	1	0	0+4	0
Player(s) who left on loan but featured this season
20	FW	(New Zealand) NZL	Chris Wood	22	3	4+14	2	0+1	0	2+1	1
26	GK	(England) ENG	Karl Darlow	1	0	0	0	0	0	1	0
Player(s) who left permanently but featured this season
8	MF	(England) ENG	Jonjo Shelvey	5	0	0+3	0	0	0	1+1	0

== See also ==
- 2022–23 in English football
- List of Newcastle United F.C. seasons
