= Bruno Guimarães =

Brazilian footballer (born 1997)

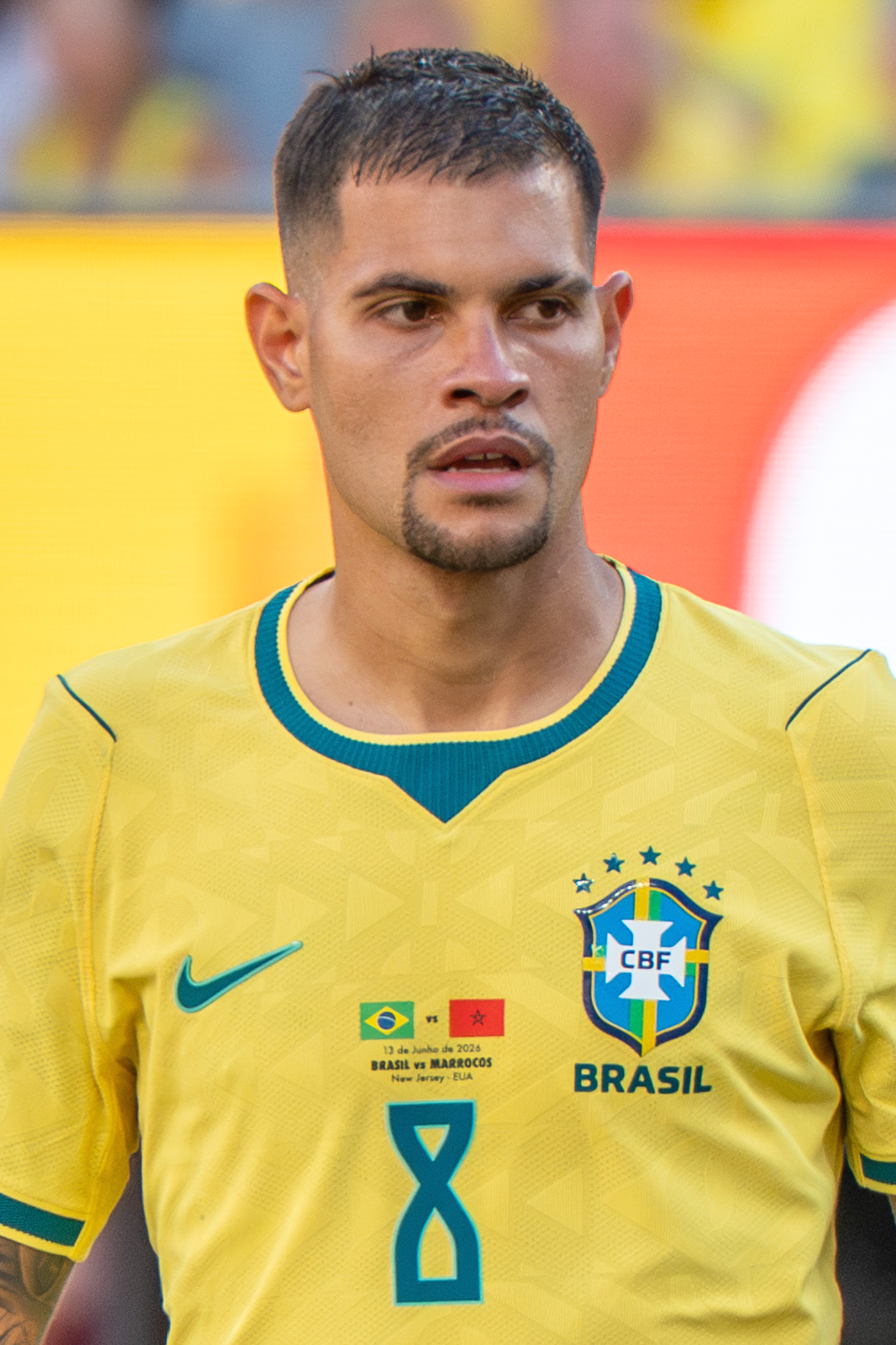
- Guimarães with Brazil in 2026

Personal information
- Full name: Bruno Guimarães Rodriguez Moura
- Date of birth: 16 November 1997 (age 29)
- Place of birth: Rio de Janeiro, Brazil
- Height: 1.82 m (6 ft 0 in)
- Position: Central midfielder

Team information
- Current team: Arsenal
- Number: 39

Youth career
- 2012–2015: Audax Rio
- 2015–2017: Audax

Senior career*
Years	Team	Apps	(Gls)
2015–2018	Audax	8	(0)
2017–2018	→ Athletico Paranaense (loan)	7	(0)
2018–2020	Athletico Paranaense	66	(5)
2020–2022	Lyon	56	(3)
2022–2026	Newcastle United	153	(30)
2026–	Arsenal	9	(2)

International career^{‡}
2019–2021	Brazil U23	18	(0)
2020–	Brazil	51	(4)
Medal record
Men's football
Representing Brazil
Olympic Games
Gold medal – first place	2020	Team
- * Club domestic league appearances and goals as of 19:34, 21 November 2026 (UTC) ‡ National team caps and goals as of 23:56, 3 October 2026 (UTC)

Bruno Guimarães Rodriguez Moura (Brazilian Portuguese pronunciation: [ˈbɾũ.nu ɡi.maˈɾɐ̃j̃s]; born 16 November 1997) is a Brazilian professional footballer who plays as a central midfielder for Premier League club Arsenal and the Brazil national team.

Guimarães began his professional career with Athletico Paranaense, before moving to Lyon in 2020, and Newcastle United in 2022. He joined Arsenal in 2026.

== Club career ==
=== Early career ===
Bruno Guimarães was born in the São Cristóvão neighbourhood of Rio de Janeiro. His father was a taxi driver. His grandfather emigrated from Spain to Jarra, and through him Guimarães has Spanish citizenship. Guimarães made his debut with Audax. on 9 April 2015, aged 17, by playing the last three minutes in a 2–1 Campeonato Paulista away win against Bragantino.

Guimarães was promoted to the main squad in the 2017 campaign after impressing in the year's Copa São Paulo de Futebol Júnior.

=== Athletico Paranaense ===
On 11 May 2017, Guimarães joined Athletico Paranaense on loan until April 2018 and was initially assigned to the under-23 squad.

Guimarães made his Série A debut on 17 June 2017, coming on as a second-half substitute for Deivid in a 1–0 away defeat of Atlético Goianiense. The following 1 March, he was bought outright and signed a contract until 2021.

Guimarães scored his first senior goal on 10 March 2018, netting his team's fourth in a 7–1 home routing of Rio Branco-PR, for the year's Campeonato Paranaense. He then became an undisputed starter for the main squad under new manager Tiago Nunes. He renewed his contract until 2023 on 5 February 2019.

=== Lyon ===
On 29 January 2020, Guimarães signed with Ligue 1 side Lyon on a four-and-a-half-year contract. The transfer fee paid to Athletico Paranaense was reported to be €20 million, which also secured a 20% sell-on clause.

=== Newcastle United ===
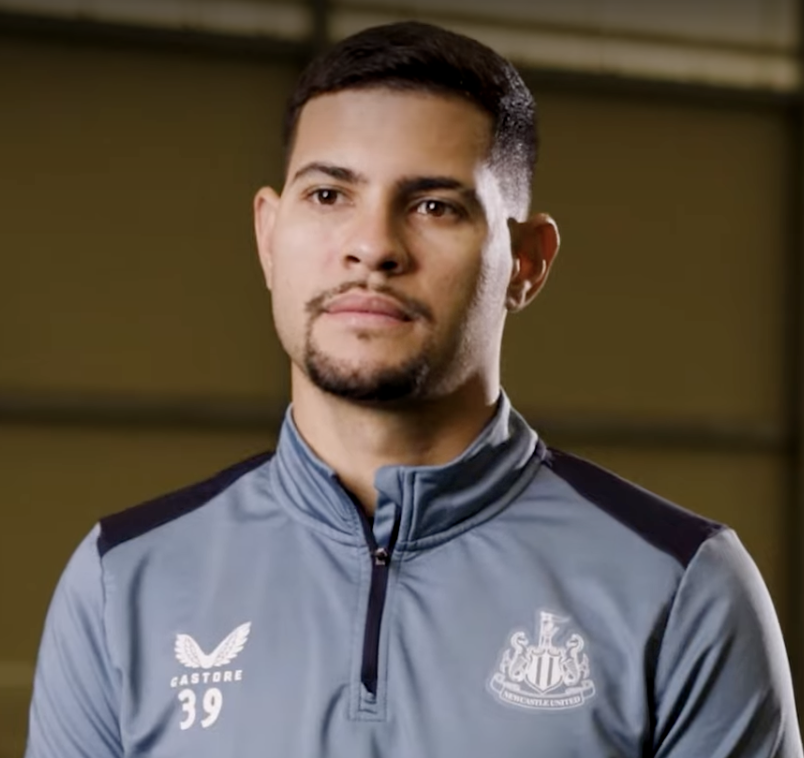
Bruno Guimarães with Newcastle United in 2024

On 30 January 2022, Guimarães joined Premier League club Newcastle United on a four-and-a-half-year contract for a reported fee of up to £40 million. He made his debut on 8 February as a late substitute in a 3–1 win against Everton.

Guimarães scored his first goal for Newcastle with a "powerful back-heel volley" in a 2–1 victory at Southampton on 10 March, on his full debut game. He scored his first brace for Newcastle in a 2–1 victory against Leicester City on 17 April, with his second coming in the 95th minute, winning the game. On 31 December 2022, Newcastle United held a moment of respect for the passing of the Brazilian footballer Pelé. In respect to Pelé, Guimarães wore the Brazilian national shirt. On 7 October 2023, he signed a new five-year contract with the club.

Guimarães ran 423 km across 37 matches in the 2023–24 Premier League, the most from any player that season. After Matt Ritchie's transfer to Portsmouth, on 8 August 2024, Guimarães joined Dan Burn, Kieran Trippier, Jamaal Lascelles and Callum Wilson as part of Newcastle United's leadership group. He was made the team captain on 19 August.

On 16 March 2025, Guimarães became the first Newcastle United captain to lift a domestic trophy in 70 years, or any trophy in 56 years, after leading the team to victory in the Carabao Cup final against Liverpool. After the match, an emotional Guimarães declared, "This is my second home. We are making history. Some day, when I leave this club, I want the fans to sing my name the way they do to Shearer."

=== Arsenal ===
On 8 August 2026, Guimarães signed a four-year contract with Arsenal for a reported transfer fee of around £75 million. On 16 August 2026, he made his debut for the club in a 3–0 victory over Manchester City in the 2026 FA Community Shield at the Millennium Stadium. Guimarães scored his first Arsenal goal on 12 September 2026, opening the scoring after coming off the bench in a 2–0 victory away to Sunderland. Guimarães scored his first goal at the Emirates Stadium and the eventual winner four weeks later in a 2–1 win over Leeds United. Guimarães had his decisive penalty saved as Arsenal crashed out the EFL Cup to Fleetwood Town.

== International career ==
Guimarães was eligible to represent Spain before earning his senior cap for Brazil. Guimarães featured for Brazil's under-23 team in the 2020 CONMEBOL Pre-Olympic Tournament. On 17 June 2021, he was named in the squad for the 2020 Summer Olympics.

In September 2020, Guimarães was called up to the senior Brazil squad for 2022 FIFA World Cup qualification matches against Bolivia and Peru on 9 and 13 October 2020, respectively. He had already been named in the Brazilian team call-up in March 2020, but that summoning was postponed in response to the COVID-19 pandemic. He debuted in a 2–0 away win over Uruguay on 17 November 2020. On 7 November 2022, Guimarães was named in the squad for the 2022 FIFA World Cup.

On 18 May 2026, Guimarães was selected for Brazil's squad for the 2026 FIFA World Cup. He recorded one assist against Morocco and two against Scotland in the group stage, before providing another in the Round of 32 victory over Japan, becoming the fourth player in the 21st century to register four assists in a single World Cup tournament, following Michael Ballack, Francesco Totti, and Juan Cuadrado. In the round of 16 against Norway, he missed a penalty in the first half; Brazil were defeated 2–1.

== Personal life ==
Guimarães married Ana Lidia Martins in June 2023 in a ceremony underneath Christ the Redeemer. The couple have two children together, a son born in October 2022, and another son born in March 2024. In addition to his native Portuguese, Guimarães also speaks French, English, and Spanish.

== Career statistics ==
=== Club ===
As of match played 7 November 2026

Appearances and goals by club, season and competition
Club	Season	League			State league (Note: Includes Campeonato Paulista)		National cup (Note: Includes Copa do Brasil, Coupe de France, FA Cup)		League cup (Note: Includes Coupe de la Ligue, EFL Cup)		Continental		Other		Total	
Club	Season	Division	Apps	Goals	Apps	Goals	Apps	Goals	Apps	Goals	Apps	Goals	Apps	Goals	Apps	Goals
Audax	2015	Campeonato Paulista	—		1	0	—		—		—		—		1	0
Audax	2016	Série D	0	0	0	0	—		—		—		—		0	0
Audax	2017	Série D	0	0	7	0	1	0	—		—		—		8	0
Audax	Total		0	0	8	0	1	0	—		—		—		9	0
Athletico Paranaense	2017	Série A	4	0	—		—		—		1 (Note: Appearance(s) in Copa Libertadores)	0	—		5	0
Athletico Paranaense	2018	Série A	32	1	12	2	3	0	—		11 (Note: Appearances in Copa Sudamericana)	2	—		58	5
Athletico Paranaense	2019	Série A	25	2	0	0	8	1	—		7	2	3 (Note: Two appearances in Recopa Sudamericana, one appearance in J.League Cup / Copa Sudamericana Championship)	0	43	5
Athletico Paranaense	Total		61	3	12	2	11	1	—		19	4	3	0	106	10
Lyon	2019–20	Ligue 1	3	0	—		1	0	1	0	4 (Note: Appearances in UEFA Champions League)	0	—		9	0
Lyon	2020–21	Ligue 1	33	3	—		4	0	—		—		—		37	3
Lyon	2021–22	Ligue 1	20	0	—		0	0	—		5 (Note: Appearances in UEFA Europa League)	0	—		25	0
Lyon	Total		56	3	—		5	0	1	0	9	0	—		71	3
Newcastle United	2021–22	Premier League	17	5	—		—		—		—		—		17	5
Newcastle United	2022–23	Premier League	32	4	—		1	1	7	0	—		—		40	5
Newcastle United	2023–24	Premier League	37	7	—		4	0	3	0	6	0	—		50	7
Newcastle United	2024–25	Premier League	38	5	—		3	0	6	0	—		—		47	5
Newcastle United	2025–26	Premier League	29	9	—		1	0	4	0	7	0	—		41	9
Newcastle United	Total		153	30	—		9	1	20	0	13	0	—		195	31
Arsenal	2026–27	Premier League	8	2	—		0	0	2	0	3	0	1 (Note: Appearance in FA Community Shield)	0	14	2
Career total			278	38	20	2	26	2	23	0	44	4	4	0	395	46

=== International ===
As of match played 3 October 2026

Appearances and goals by national team and year
National team	Year	Apps	Goals
Brazil	2020	1	0
Brazil	2021	2	0
Brazil	2022	7	1
Brazil	2023	8	0
Brazil	2024	14	0
Brazil	2025	9	1
Brazil	2026	10	2
Total		51	4

Scores and results list Brazil's goal tally first, score column indicates score after each Bruno Guimarães goal.

List of international goals scored by Bruno Guimarães
No.	Date	Venue	Cap	Opponent	Score	Result	Competition
1	29 March 2022	Estadio Hernando Siles, La Paz, Bolivia	6	Bolivia	3–0	4–0	2022 FIFA World Cup qualification
2	4 September 2025	Estádio do Maracanã, Rio de Janeiro, Brazil	36	Chile	3–0	3–0	2026 FIFA World Cup qualification
3	6 June 2026	Huntington Bank Field, Cleveland, United States	43	Egypt	1–0	2–1	Friendly
4	29 September 2026	Lang Park, Brisbane, Australia	50	Australia	3–2	4–2	Friendly

== Honours ==
Athletico Paranaense

- Copa do Brasil: 2019
- Campeonato Paranaense: 2018
- Copa Sudamericana: 2018
- J.League Cup / Copa Sudamericana Championship: 2019

Lyon

- Coupe de la Ligue runner-up: 2019–20

Newcastle United

- EFL Cup: 2024–25; runner-up: 2022–23

Arsenal

- FA Community Shield: 2026

Brazil U23

- Summer Olympics: 2020

Individual

- Campeonato Brasileiro Série A Team of the Year: 2019
- CONMEBOL Pre-Olympic Tournament Best Player: 2020
- North East FWA Player of the Year: 2022
- IFFHS Men's CONMEBOL Team: 2025
- Newcastle United Player of the Year: 2026
