= 1893–94 Newcastle United F.C. season =

Newcastle United
1893–94 season
- Stadium: St James' Park
- Football League Second Division: 4th
- FA Cup: Second round
- Top goalscorer: League: Joseph Wallace (15); All: Joseph Wallace (17)
- Highest home attendance: 10,000 (vs. Bolton Wanderers & Crewe Alexandra)
- Lowest home attendance: 600 (vs. Rotherham Town)
- Average home league attendance: 3,769
Home colours	Away colours

The 1893–94 season was Newcastle United's first season in The Football League after they, and Middlesbrough Ironopolis, were elected to the Second Division from the Northern League.

== Appearances and goals ==
Pos.	Name	League		FA Cup		Total	
Pos.	Name	Apps	Goals	Apps	Goals	Apps	Goals
GK	(England) William Lowery	26	0	2	0	28	0
GK	(Scotland) Andrew Ramsay	1	0	0	0	1	0
GK	(England) Joe Ryder	1	0	0	0	1	0
DF	(England) Harry Jeffrey	25	3	2	0	27	3
DF	(England) J Laverick	3	0	0	0	3	0
DF	(Scotland) James Miller	9	0	0	0	9	0
DF	(Scotland) Thomas Rodgers	16	0	2	0	18	0
MF	J Barr	1	0	0	0	1	0
MF	(Scotland) Robert Crielly	28	1	2	0	30	1
MF	(Scotland) William Graham	28	5	2	0	30	5
MF	(Scotland) Joseph McKane	28	0	2	0	30	0
FW	(England) Thomas Bartlett	3	3	0	0	3	3
FW	(Scotland) John Bowman	1	0	0	0	1	0
FW	(Scotland) Thomas Crate	28	12	2	1	30	13
FW	(England) Toby Gillespy	4	0	0	0	4	0
FW	(Scotland) John Inglis	3	0	0	0	3	0
FW	(Scotland) Matthew Keir	1	0	0	0	1	0
FW	(Scotland) John Law	8	2	2	0	10	2
FW	(England) John Patten	1	0	0	0	1	0
FW	(England) Charlie Quinn	23	5	2	0	25	5
FW	(England) Isaac Ryder	1	0	0	0	1	0
FW	(England) William Simm	1	0	0	0	1	0
FW	(Scotland) Jock Sorley	1	1	0	0	1	1
FW	(England) Willie Thompson	26	10	2	0	28	10
FW	(Scotland) Joseph Wallace	25	15	2	2	27	17
FW	(England) Robert Willis	16	5	0	0	16	5

== Competitions ==
Win Draw Loss

=== League ===
Round	1	2	3	4	5	6	7	8	9	10	11	12	13	14	15	16	17	18	19	20	21	22	23	24	25	26	27	28
Result	2–2	1–3	6–0	1–2	1–3	3–2	0–2	1–5	3–5	0–0	3–0	4–1	1–1	2–1	1–1	2–1	5–1	7–2	2–1	3–0	1–2	1–1	4–0	4–1	2–0	2–1	4–1	0–0
Position	6th	14th	10th	12th	12th	9th	10th	11th	12th	12th	11th	8th	9th	8th	8th	7th	6th	5th	5th	5th	5th	5th	4th	4th	4th	4th	4th	4th

=== FA Cup ===
Match	1	2
Result	2–0	1–2

=== Friendlies ===
Match	1	2	3	4	5	6	7	8	9	10	11	12	13	14	15	16
Result	2–0	1–3	2–2	5–1	2–0	3–0	6–1	0–2	3–0	1–2	2–8	4–1	2–0	1–1	0–0	1–3

== Matches ==
=== League ===
2 September 1893	Woolwich Arsenal	2–2	Newcastle United	London
	Shaw 8'; Elliott	(Report)	Crate 65'; Sorley	Stadium: Manor Ground; Attendance: 6,000

23 September 1893	Burton Swifts	3–1	Newcastle United	Burton upon Trent
	Goal	(Report)	Goal	Stadium: Peel Croft

30 September 1893	Newcastle United	6–0	Woolwich Arsenal	Newcastle upon Tyne
	Wallace; Thompson	(Report)		Stadium: St James' Park; Attendance: 2,000; Referee: Mr Chalmers (Middlesbrough)

7 October 1893	Lincoln City	2–1	Newcastle United	Lincoln
	Goal	(Report)	Wallace	Stadium: Sincil Bank; Attendance: 1,000

14 October 1893	Notts County	3–1	Newcastle United	Nottingham
	Watson 8'; Logan 10'; Daft	(Report)	Wallace	Stadium: County Ground; Attendance: 5,000

23 October 1893	Ardwick	2–3	Newcastle United	Manchester
	Yates; Morris	(Report)	Wallace; Crate (o.g.)	Stadium: Hyde Road; Attendance: 3,000

28 October 1893	Newcastle United	0–2	Small Heath	Newcastle upon Tyne
		(Report)	Goal	Stadium: St James' Park; Attendance: 3,000

4 November 1893	Liverpool	5–1	Newcastle United	Liverpool
	Bradshaw; Dick; Gordon; Stott	(Report)	Thompson	Stadium: Anfield; Attendance: 8,000

18 November 1893	Northwich Victoria	5–3	Newcastle United	Northwich
	Goal	(Report)	Crate; Thompson; Scanlan (o.g.)	Stadium: Drill Field; Attendance: 400

25 November 1893	Newcastle United	0–0	Liverpool	Newcastle upon Tyne
		(Report)		Stadium: St James' Park; Attendance: 2,000

9 December 1893	Newcastle United	3–0	Notts County	Newcastle upon Tyne
	Wallace; Thompson	(Report)		Stadium: St James' Park; Attendance: 3,500

16 December 1893	Small Heath	1–4	Newcastle United	Birmingham
	Goal	(Report)	Crate; Wallace; Willis; Graham	Stadium: Muntz Street; Attendance: 2,500

25 December 1893	Middlesbrough Ironopolis	1–1	Newcastle United	Middlesbrough
	Grewar	(Report)	Crate	Stadium: Paradise Ground; Attendance: 2,000

26 December 1893	Walsall Town Swifts	1–2	Newcastle United	Walsall
	Goal	(Report)	Wallace	Stadium: Hillary Street; Attendance: 5,000

27 December 1893	Crewe Alexandra	1–1	Newcastle United	Crewe
	Goal	(Report)	Graham	Stadium: Alexandra Stadium; Attendance: 2,000

30 December 1893	Newcastle United	2–1	Burslem Port Vale	Newcastle upon Tyne
	Crate; Crielly	(Report)	Beats	Stadium: St James' Park; Attendance: 3,000

1 January 1894	Newcastle United	5–1	Lincoln City	Newcastle upon Tyne
	Bartlett; Thompson; Quinn	(Report)	Goal	Stadium: St James' Park; Attendance: 4,000

2 January 1894	Newcastle United	7–2	Middlesbrough Ironopolis	Newcastle upon Tyne
	Law; Thompson; Willis; Quinn; Graham	(Report)	Cooper	Stadium: St James' Park; Attendance: 3,000

6 January 1894	Newcastle United	2–1	Ardwick	Newcastle upon Tyne
	Thompson; Graham	(Report)	Pickford	Stadium: St James' Park; Attendance: 1,200

13 January 1894	Newcastle United	3–0	Northwich Victoria	Newcastle upon Tyne
	Crate	(Report)		Stadium: St James' Park; Attendance: 2,000

20 January 1894	Rotherham Town	2–1	Newcastle United	Rotherham
	Goal	(Report)	Wallace	Stadium: Clifton Lane; Attendance: 1,000

3 February 1894	Burslem Port Vale	1–1	Newcastle United	Stoke-on-Trent
	Wood	(Report)	Wallace	Stadium: Athletic Ground; Attendance: 2,000

17 February 1894	Newcastle United	4–0	Rotherham Town	Newcastle upon Tyne
	Wallace; Crate; Quinn; Graham	(Report)		Stadium: St James' Park; Attendance: 600

24 February 1894	Newcastle United	4–1	Grimsby Town	Newcastle upon Tyne
	Crate; Thompson; Quinn; Jeffrey	(Report)	Goal	Stadium: St James' Park; Attendance: 4,000

10 March 1894	Newcastle United	2–0	Walsall Town Swifts	Newcastle upon Tyne
	Crate; Jeffrey (pen.)	(Report)		Stadium: St James' Park; Attendance: 2,000

23 March 1894	Newcastle United	2–1	Crewe Alexandra	Newcastle upon Tyne
	Jeffrey (o.g.)	(Report)	Goal	Stadium: St James' Park; Attendance: 10,000

24 March 1894	Newcastle United	4–1	Burton Swifts	Newcastle upon Tyne
	Law; Wallace; Willis	(Report)	Goal	Stadium: St James' Park; Attendance: 3,000

24 March 1894	Grimsby Town	0–0	Newcastle United	Grimsby
		(Report)		Stadium: Abbey Park; Attendance: 2,000

=== FA Cup ===
27 January 1894 Round 1	Newcastle United	2–0	Sheffield United	Newcastle upon Tyne
	Wallace	(Report)		Stadium: St James' Park; Attendance: 7,000

10 February 1894 Round 2	Newcastle United	1–2	Bolton Wanderers	Newcastle upon Tyne
	Crate	(Report)	Hughes; Rogers (o.g.)	Stadium: St James' Park; Attendance: 10,000

=== Friendlies ===
4 September 1893	Trafalgar	0–2	Newcastle United
			Pattinson; Thompson	Attendance: 800

6 September 1893	Newcastle United	1–3	Sunderland	Newcastle upon Tyne
	Thompson		Goal	Stadium: St James' Park; Attendance: 2,800

9 September 1893	Middlesbrough	2–2	Newcastle United	Middlesbrough
	Creilly; Crate		Goal	Stadium: Linthorpe Road; Attendance: 1,400

11 November 1893	Newcastle United	5–1	Sheffield United	Newcastle upon Tyne
	Crate; Thompson; Milne		Goal	Stadium: St James' Park; Attendance: 4,000

2 December 1893	Dipton Wanderers	0–2	Newcastle United	Dipton
			Thompson; Crate	Attendance: 500

23 December 1893	Newcastle United	3–0	Royal Scots Regiment	Newcastle upon Tyne
	Crate; Willis			Stadium: St James' Park; Attendance: 2,000

17 March 1894	Newcastle United	6–1	Burslem Port Vale	Newcastle upon Tyne
	Quinn; Willis; Thompson; Wallace			Stadium: St James' Park; Attendance: 1,500

26 March 1894	Leicester Fosse	2–0	Newcastle United	Leicester
	Goal			Stadium: Filbert Street; Attendance: 10,000

31 March 1894	Newcastle United	3–0	Middlesbrough Ironopolis	Newcastle upon Tyne
	Crate; Wallace; Law			Stadium: St James' Park; Attendance: 1,000

5 April 1894	Newcastle United	1–2	Sunderland	Newcastle upon Tyne
	Graham (pen.)		Goal	Stadium: St James' Park; Attendance: 5,000

7 April 1894	Dundee	8–2	Newcastle United	Dundee
	Goal		MacFarlane; Willis	Stadium: Carolina Port; Attendance: 2,000

21 April 1894	Newcastle United	4–1	Sunderland	Newcastle upon Tyne
	Quinn; Crate; Campbell; Willis		Goal	Stadium: St James' Park; Attendance: 7,500

23 April 1894 W Steele Benefit Match	Willington Athletic	0–2	Newcastle United	Willington Quay
			Law

25 April 1894 G Matthews Widow Benefit Match	Shankhouse	1–1	Newcastle United	Shankhouse, Northumberland
	Goal		Crate

28 April 1894	Middlesbrough Ironopolis	0–0	Newcastle United	Middlesbrough
				Stadium: Paradise Ground; Attendance: 2,000

30 April 1894	Newcastle United	1–3	Sunderland	Newcastle upon Tyne
	Crate		Goal	Stadium: St James' Park; Attendance: 6,000
