= 1894–95 Newcastle United F.C. season =

Newcastle United
1894–95 season
- Stadium: St James' Park
- Football League Second Division: 10th
- FA Cup: Second round
- Top goalscorer: League: Willie Thompson (18); All: Willie Thompson (19)
- Highest home attendance: 8,000 (vs. Burnley)
- Lowest home attendance: 1,500 (vs. Grimsby Town & Walsall Town Swifts)
- Average home league attendance: 4,438
Home colours	Away colours

The 1894–95 season was Newcastle United's second season in the Second Division of The Football League. Newcastle suffered their record defeat in the final game of the season, a 0–9 loss against Burton Wanderers.

== Appearances and goals ==
Pos.	Name	League		FA Cup		Total	
Pos.	Name	Apps	Goals	Apps	Goals	Apps	Goals
GK	(Scotland) John Hynd	9	0	0	0	9	0
GK	(England) W Lowery	2	0	0	0	2	0
GK	(England) Joe Ryder	1	0	0	0	1	0
GK	(England) W.A. Ward	18	0	2	0	20	0
DF	? Haynes	1	0	0	0	1	0
DF	(England) Harry Jeffrey	20	0	0	0	20	0
DF	(England) J Laverick	1	0	0	0	1	0
DF	(Scotland) Robert McDermid	20	1	2	0	22	1
DF	(Scotland) Thomas Rogers	6	0	0	0	6	0
MF	(Scotland) Robert Crielly	26	0	2	0	28	0
MF	(Scotland) William Graham	28	3	2	0	30	3
MF	(Scotland) Joseph McKane	13	0	0	0	13	0
MF	(England) Thomas Rendell	23	0	2	2	25	2
FW	T Cambell	2	0	0	0	2	0
FW	(Scotland) Thomas Crate	11	2	0	0	11	2
FW	(Scotland) Charles Dickson	20	11	2	0	22	11
FW	? Donaldson	2	0	0	0	2	0
FW	(England) Richard Hedley	3	1	0	0	3	1
FW	(Scotland) Jack McNee	21	4	2	0	23	4
FW	(England) William Milne	5	1	0	0	5	1
FW	(Scotland) Patrick O'Brien	10	2	2	0	12	2
FW	(Scotland) John Smith	25	10	2	0	27	10
FW	(England) Willie Thompson	28	18	2	1	30	19
FW	(Scotland) Joseph Wallace	17	4	0	0	17	4
FW	(England) Robert Willis	18	13	2	0	20	13

== Competitions ==
Win Draw Loss

=== League ===
Round	1	2	3	4	5	6	7	8	9	10	11	12	13	14	15	16	17	18	19	20	21	22	23	24	25	26	27	28	29	30
Result	0–5	6–3	0–3	2–2	2–0	4–4	3–2	4–4	5–4	1–4	3–1	1–3	2–4	1–4	5–2	7–2	6–0	0–1	3–2	4–2	3–5	2–3	0–4	1–2	1–0	1–2	1–5	1–2	3–0	0–9
Position	14th	9th	12th	11th	9th	10th	7th	9th	6th	8th	6th	7th	8th	8th	8th	5th	5th	5th	5th	4th	5th	5th	7th	10th	9th	10th	10th	10th	10th	10th

=== FA Cup ===
Match	1	2
Result	2–1	1–7

=== Friendlies ===
Match	1	2	3	4	5	6	7	8	9	10	11	12
Result	1–4	1–3	4–2	1–4	5–1	2–2	6–1	2–5	1–6	1–0	5–3	1–0

== Matches ==
=== League ===
1 September 1894	Darwen	5–0	Newcastle United	Darwen
	Goal	(Report)		Stadium: Barley Bank; Attendance: 5,000

8 September 1894	Newcastle United	6–3	Burton Swifts	Newcastle upon Tyne
	Wallace; Smith (pen.); Willis	(Report)	Goal	Stadium: St James' Park; Attendance: 6,000

15 September 1894	Grimsby Town	3–0	Newcastle United	Grimsby
	Goal	(Report)		Stadium: Abbey Park; Attendance: 5,000

22 September 1894	Newcastle United	2–2	Notts County	Newcastle upon Tyne
	Thompson; Willis	(Report)	Goal	Stadium: St James' Park; Attendance: 3,000

29 September 1894	Newcastle United	2–0	Leicester Fosse	Newcastle upon Tyne
	Thompson	(Report)		Stadium: St James' Park; Attendance: 5,000

6 October 1894	Burslem Port Vale	4–4	Newcastle United	Stoke-on-Trent
	Scarratt; Wood; Smith; Eccles	(Report)	Dickson; McNee; Thompson; Willis	Stadium: Athletic Ground; Attendance: 2,000

13 October 1894	Newcastle United	3–2	Darwen	Newcastle upon Tyne
	Dickson; McNee	(Report)	Goal	Stadium: St James' Park; Attendance: 6,000

20 October 1894	Leicester Fosse	4–4	Newcastle United	Leicester
	Goal	(Report)	Dickson; Thompson; Willis; Smith (pen.)	Stadium: Filbert Street; Attendance: 8,000

27 October 1894	Newcastle United	5–4	Manchester City	Newcastle upon Tyne
	Dickson; Thompson; Graham	(Report)	Sharples; Finnerhan; McReddie	Stadium: St James' Park; Attendance: 3,000

3 November 1894	Bury	4–1	Newcastle United	Manchester
	Goal	(Report)	Thompson	Stadium: Gigg Lane; Attendance: 4,000

10 November 1894	Newcastle United	3–1	Burton Wanderers	Newcastle upon Tyne
	Thompson; Smith; McDermidd	(Report)	Goal	Stadium: St James' Park; Attendance: 6,000

17 November 1894	Lincoln City	3–1	Newcastle United	Lincoln
	Goal	(Report)	Wallace	Stadium: Sincil Bank; Attendance: 2,000

24 November 1894	Newcastle United	2–4	Woolwich Arsenal	Newcastle upon Tyne
	Dickson	(Report)	Crawford; Buchanan; O'Brien; Sharpe	Stadium: St James' Park; Attendance: 3,000

1 December 1894	Newcastle United	1–4	Grimsby Town	Newcastle upon Tyne
	Thompson	(Report)	Goal	Stadium: St James' Park; Attendance: 1,500

15 December 1894	Newcastle United	5–2	Rotherham Town	Newcastle upon Tyne
	Dickson; Willis; Graham	(Report)	Goal	Stadium: St James' Park; Attendance: 4,000

22 December 1894	Newcastle United	7–2	Walsall Town Swifts	Newcastle upon Tyne
	Crate; Smith; Willis; Holmes (o.g.)	(Report)	Goal	Stadium: St James' Park; Attendance: 1,500

25 December 1894	Newcastle United	6–0	Crewe Alexandra	Newcastle upon Tyne
	Wallace; O'Brien; Willis; Smith	(Report)		Stadium: St James' Park; Attendance: 7,000

26 December 1894	Rotherham Town	1–0	Newcastle United	Rotherham
	Goal	(Report)		Stadium: Clifton Lane; Attendance: 4,000

29 December 1894	Walsall Town Swifts	2–3	Newcastle United	Walsall
	Goal	(Report)	Willis	Stadium: Hillary Street; Attendance: 2,000

1 January 1895	Newcastle United	4–2	Lincoln City	Newcastle upon Tyne
	Dickson; Willis; Thompson	(Report)	Goal	Stadium: St James' Park; Attendance: 4,000

5 January 1895	Burton Swifts	5–3	Newcastle United	Burton upon Trent
	Goal	(Report)	Lawrence (o.g.); O'Brien; Graham	Stadium: Peel Croft; Attendance: 3,000

12 January 1895	Woolwich Arsenal	3–2	Newcastle United	London
	Crawford; Meade; Buchanan	(Report)	Thompson	Stadium: Manor Ground; Attendance: 5,000

9 February 1895	Manchester City	4–0	Newcastle United	Manchester
	Finnerhan; Meredith; Rowan	(Report)		Stadium: Hyde Road; Attendance: 3,500

9 March 1895	Crewe Alexandra	2–1	Newcastle United	Crewe
	Goal	(Report)	Hedley	Stadium: Alexandra Stadium; Attendance: 7,000

16 March 1895	Newcastle United	1–0	Bury	Newcastle upon Tyne
	Thompson 30'	(Report)		Stadium: St James' Park; Attendance: 6,000

23 March 1895	Notts County	2–1	Newcastle United	Nottingham
	Goal	(Report)	Thompson	Stadium: County Ground; Attendance: 5,000

6 April 1895	Newton Heath	5–1	Newcastle United	Manchester
	Cassidy; Smith (o.g.)	(Report)	Dickson	Stadium: Bank Street; Attendance: 6,000

12 April 1895	Newcastle United	1–2	Burslem Port Vale	Newcastle upon Tyne
	McNee	(Report)	Eardley	Stadium: St James' Park; Attendance: 3,000

13 April 1895	Newcastle United	3–0	Newton Heath	Newcastle upon Tyne
	McNee; Thompson; Milne	(Report)		Stadium: St James' Park; Attendance: 4,000

15 April 1895	Burton Wanderers	9–0	Newcastle United	Burton upon Trent
	Goal	(Report)		Stadium: Derby Turn; Attendance: 3,000

=== FA Cup ===
2 February 1895 Round 1	Newcastle United	2–1	Burnley	Newcastle upon Tyne
	Rendell	(Report)	Goal	Stadium: St James' Park; Attendance: 8,000

16 February 1895 Round 2	Aston Villa	7–1	Newcastle United	Birmingham
	Devey; Dorrell; Athersmith; Russell	(Report)	Thompson	Stadium: Villa Park; Attendance: 10,000

=== Friendlies ===
5 September 1894	Newcastle United	1–4	Sunderland	Newcastle upon Tyne
	Smith		Goal	Stadium: St James' Park; Attendance: 4,500

12 September 1894	Newcastle United	1–3	Hibernian	Newcastle upon Tyne
	Cambell		Goal	Stadium: St James' Park; Attendance: 1,500

5 December 1894	Bedlington Turks	2–4	Newcastle United	Bedlington
	Goal		Thompson; McNee; Burton (o.g.); Dickson	Attendance: 1,200

19 January 1895	Newcastle United	1–4	Sunderland	Newcastle upon Tyne
	Smith		Goal	Stadium: St James' Park; Attendance: 8,000

28 January 1895	Newcastle United	5–1	Hurlford	Newcastle upon Tyne
	Thompson; McNee (o.g.)		Goal	Stadium: St James' Park; Attendance: 4,000

23 February 1895	Blyth	2–2	Newcastle United	Blyth
	Goal		Wallace; Graham (pen.)	Attendance: 3,000

2 March 1895	Newcastle United	6–1	East Stirlingshire	Newcastle upon Tyne
	Dickson; Thompson; Smith; Milne		Goal	Stadium: St James' Park; Attendance: 1,000

30 March 1895	Newcastle United	2–5	Rangers	Newcastle upon Tyne
	Milne; Wallace		Goal	Stadium: St James' Park; Attendance: 2,000

16 April 1895	Newcastle United	1–6	Bolton Wanderers	Newcastle upon Tyne
	McNee		Goal	Stadium: St James' Park; Attendance: 4,000

22 April 1895	Newcastle United	1–0	Sunderland	Newcastle upon Tyne
	Thompson			Stadium: St James' Park; Attendance: 4,000

27 April 1895	Newcastle United	5–3	Preston North End	Newcastle upon Tyne
	Wright; Dickson; Thompson			Stadium: St James' Park; Attendance: 4,000

30 April 1895	Jarrow	0–1	Newcastle United	Jarrow
			Thompson	Attendance: 2,500
