= 1892–93 Newcastle United F.C. season =

Newcastle United
1892–93 season
- Stadium: St James' Park
- Northern League: 2nd
- FA Cup: First round
- Top goalscorer: League: Jock Sorley (7); All: Jock Sorley & Willie Thompson (7)
- Highest home attendance: 4,000 (vs. Middlesbrough twice)
- Lowest home attendance: 2,000 (vs. Darlington)
- Average home league attendance: 3,000
Home colours	Away colours

The 1892–93 season was the first season in the history of Newcastle United after the merger of Newcastle East End and Newcastle West End. The club started the season as Newcastle East End, taking the name Newcastle United during December. They participated in the Northern League, the only season they have not competed in The Football League, finishing in second place behind Middlesbrough Ironopolis. They also competed in the FA Cup, but lost in the first round to Middlesbrough.

== Appearances and goals ==
Pos.	Name	League		FA Cup		Total	
Pos.	Name	Apps	Goals	Apps	Goals	Apps	Goals
GK	(England) David Whitton	10	0	1	0	11	0
DF	(England) Harry Jeffrey	7	0	1	0	8	0
DF	(Scotland) James Miller	10	0	1	0	11	0
DF	Peter Watson	3	0	0	0	3	0
MF	(Scotland) Robert Crielly	9	1	1	0	10	1
MF	(Scotland) William Graham	10	2	1	0	11	2
MF	(Scotland) Joseph McKane	7	0	1	0	8	0
FW	John Barker	1	0	0	0	1	0
FW	(Scotland) James Collins	10	1	1	0	11	1
FW	(Scotland) Thomas Crate	9	2	0	0	9	2
FW	(England) Harry Reay	9	4	1	1	10	5
FW	(Scotland) Jock Sorley	8	7	1	0	9	7
FW	(England) Willie Thompson	8	6	1	1	9	7
FW	(Scotland) Joseph Wallace	8	6	1	0	9	6

== Competitions ==
Win Draw Loss

=== League ===
Round	1	2	3	4	5	6	7	8	9	10
Result	1–5	3–1	5–0	2–3	7–0	5–1	1–2	5–2	1–1	0–4
Position		3rd	2nd	2nd	2nd	2nd	2nd	2nd	2nd	2nd

=== FA Cup ===
Match	1
Result	2–3

=== Friendlies ===
Match	1	2	3	4	5	6	7	8	9	10	11	12	13	14	15	16	17	18
Result	0–1	2–2	4–1	2–1	1–3	1–0	7–0	2–0	4–1	2–2	2–1	0–1	8–1	4–2	4–0	3–1	2–3	3–1

Match	19	20	21	22	23	24	25	26	27	28	29	30	31	32	33	34	35	36
Result	9–1	3–2	1–6	3–4	6–1	3–1	4–1	3–2	5–0	3–3	0–0	0–4	7–2	2–5	5–0	1–0	5–3	5–0

== Matches ==
=== League ===
24 September 1892	Sheffield United	5–1	Newcastle East End	Sheffield
	Drummond; Scott; Wallace; Hammond; Dobson	(Report)	Sorley 38'	Stadium: Bramall Lane; Attendance: 5,000

1 October 1892	Newcastle East End	3–1	Middlesbrough	Newcastle upon Tyne
	Wallace; Thompson	(Report)	Abrahams	Stadium: St James' Park; Attendance: 4,000; Referee: H. Stacey (Sheffield)

12 November 1892	Newcastle East End	5–0	Darlington	Newcastle upon Tyne
	Graham; Thompson; Sorley; Collins	(Report)		Stadium: St James' Park; Attendance: 2,000; Referee: S. Kemp (Redcar)

19 November 1892	Middlesbrough Ironopolis	3–2	Newcastle East End	Middlesbrough
	Seymour; Hughes	(Report)	Thompson	Stadium: Paradise Ground; Attendance: 5,000

26 November 1892	Darlington	0–7	Newcastle East End	Darlington
		(Report)	Reay; Sorley; Thompson; Wallace	Stadium: Feethams; Attendance: 1,500; Referee: Mr. Tomlinson (Sheffield)

3 December 1892	Newcastle East End	5–1	Stockton	Newcastle upon Tyne
	Graham 10'; Crielly 12'; Thompson; Sorley; Wallace	(Report)	Thompson 17'	Stadium: St James' Park; Attendance: 3,000

10 December 1892	Newcastle East End	1–2	Middlesbrough Ironopolis	Newcastle upon Tyne
	Reay	(Report)	McReddie; McArthur	Stadium: St James' Park; Attendance: 2,500

17 December 1892	Stockton	2–5	Newcastle East End	Stockton-on-Tees
	Thompson	(Report)	Sorley; Crate; Reay	Stadium: Victoria Ground; Attendance: 4,000; Referee: J.H. Strawson (Lincoln)

14 January 1893	Newcastle United	1–1	Sheffield United	Newcastle upon Tyne
	Cain 68' (o.g.)	(Report)	Miller 70' (o.g.)	Stadium: St James' Park; Attendance: 2,500

11 February 1893 *	Middlesbrough	4–0	Newcastle United	Middlesbrough
	McKnight; McCabe; Blyth	(Report)		Stadium: Linthorpe Road; Attendance: 4,000; Referee: J.H. Strawson (Lincoln)

* Newcastle played this game with ten men, as Joseph McKane missed the train and failed to turn up. The match was also delayed by 45 minutes as the rest of the team arrived late.

=== FA Cup ===
21 January 1893 Round 1	Newcastle United	2–3	Middlesbrough	Newcastle upon Tyne
	Thompson; Reay	(Report)	Blyth 43'; McKnight 50'; Lewis	Stadium: St James' Park; Attendance: 4,000; Referee: Sam Ormerod (Accrington)

=== Friendlies ===
3 September 1982	Newcastle East End	0–1	Celtic	Newcastle upon Tyne
			Goal	Stadium: St James' Park; Attendance: 7,000

7 September 1982	Newcastle East End	2–2	Sunderland	Newcastle upon Tyne
	Crate; Wallace		Goal	Stadium: St James' Park; Attendance: 6,000

10 September 1982	Newcastle East End	4–1	Middlesbrough Ironopolis	Newcastle upon Tyne
	Thompson; Collins; Oliver (o.g.)		Goal	Stadium: St James' Park; Attendance: 4,000

17 September 1982	Middlesbrough Ironopolis	1–2	Newcastle East End	Middlesbrough
	Goal		Sorley; Collins	Stadium: Paradise Ground; Attendance: 4,000

6 October 1892	Stockton	3–1	Newcastle East End	Stockton-on-Tees
	Goal		Collins	Stadium: Victoria Ground; Attendance: 3,500

8 October 1892	Middlesbrough	0–1	Newcastle East End	Middlesbrough
			Collins	Stadium: Linthorpe Road; Attendance: 3,000

15 October 1982	Newcastle East End	7–0	South of Ayrshire	Newcastle upon Tyne
	Reay; Creilly; Collins; Crate			Stadium: St James' Park; Attendance: 3,000

22 October 1982	Newcastle East End	2–0	Heart of Midlothian	Newcastle upon Tyne
	Reay			Stadium: St James' Park; Attendance: 3,000

29 October 1982	Newcastle East End	4–1	Mossend Swifts	Newcastle upon Tyne
	Sorley		Goal	Stadium: St James' Park; Attendance: 1,500

5 November 1982	Newcastle East End	2–2	Sheffield United	Newcastle upon Tyne
	Reay; Sorley		Goal	Stadium: St James' Park; Attendance: 4,500

24 December 1982	Newcastle United	2–1	Middlesbrough	Newcastle upon Tyne
	McIntosh; Reay		Goal	Stadium: St James' Park; Attendance: 1,500

26 December 1982	Sheffield Wednesday	1–0	Newcastle United	Sheffield
	Goal			Stadium: Olive Grove; Attendance: 6,000

31 December 1982	Newcastle United	8–1	Corinthian	Newcastle upon Tyne
	McKane; Sorley; McIntosh; Thompson; Reay		Goal	Stadium: St James' Park; Attendance: 1,500

2 January 1893	Newcastle United	4–2	Everton	Newcastle upon Tyne
	Thompson; Sorley; Reay		Goal	Stadium: St James' Park; Attendance: 3,000

3 January 1893	Newcastle United	4–0	Rangers	Newcastle upon Tyne
	Reay; Creilly; Thompson; Sorley			Stadium: St James' Park; Attendance: 3,000

7 January 1893	Newcastle United	3–1	Bolton Wanderers	Newcastle upon Tyne
	Reay; Thompson		Goal	Stadium: St James' Park; Attendance: 2,000

28 January 1893	Stockton	3–2	Newcastle United	Stockton-on-Tees
	Goal		Sorley	Stadium: Victoria Ground; Attendance: 2,000

4 February 1893	Newcastle United	3–1	Stockton	Newcastle upon Tyne
	Reay; Crate		Goal	Stadium: St James' Park; Attendance: 1,500

15 February 1893	Bedlington Wednesday	1–9	Newcastle United	Bedlington
	Goal		Crate; Creilly; Miller; Reay; Wallace	Attendance: 1,000

18 February 1893	Newcastle United	3–2	Notts County	Newcastle upon Tyne
	Thompson; Sorley		Goal	Stadium: St James' Park; Attendance: 3,000

25 February 1893	Newcastle United	1–6	Sunderland	Newcastle upon Tyne
	Graham		Goal	Stadium: St James' Park; Attendance: 7,000

4 March 1893	Newcastle United	3–4	Stoke	Newcastle upon Tyne
	Graham; Reay; Wallace		Goal	Stadium: St James' Park; Attendance: 4,000

11 March 1893	Newcastle United	6–1	Annbank	Newcastle upon Tyne
	Reay; Thompson		Goal	Stadium: St James' Park; Attendance: 2,000

18 March 1893	Newcastle United	3–1	Derby County	Newcastle upon Tyne
	Collins; Methven (o.g.)		Goal	Stadium: St James' Park; Attendance: 3,000

25 March 1893	Newcastle United	4–1	Nottingham Forest	Newcastle upon Tyne
	Sorley (pen.); Reay		Goal	Stadium: St James' Park; Attendance: 3,000

31 March 1893	Blyth	2–3	Newcastle United	Blyth
	Goal		Reay; Sorley (pen.)	Attendance: 3,000

1 April 1893	Newcastle United	5–0	Casuals	Newcastle upon Tyne
	Pattinson; Collins; Crate			Stadium: St James' Park; Attendance: 2,000

3 April 1893	Stockton	3–3	Newcastle United	Stockton-on-Tees
	Goal		Crate; Graham; Collins	Stadium: Victoria Ground

8 April 1893	Newcastle United	0–0	Liverpool	Newcastle upon Tyne
				Stadium: St James' Park; Attendance: 2,500

12 April 1893	Newcastle United	0–4	Sunderland	Newcastle upon Tyne
			Goal	Stadium: St James' Park; Attendance: 3,000

15 April 1893	Newcastle United	7–2	West Bromwich Albion	Newcastle upon Tyne
	Sorley; Crate; Wallace; Reay		Goal	Stadium: St James' Park; Attendance: 2,000

17 April 1893	Everton	5–2	Newcastle United	Liverpool
	Goal		Collins; Crate	Stadium: Goodison Park

22 April 1893	Newcastle United	5–0	Accrington XI	Newcastle upon Tyne
	Crate; Pattinson; Collins			Stadium: St James' Park; Attendance: 2,000

26 April 1893	Newcastle United	1–0	Middlesbrough Ironopolis	Newcastle upon Tyne
	Collins			Stadium: St James' Park; Attendance: 2,000

28 April 1893 Alec McCurdie Testimonial	Newcastle United	5–3	District XI
	Goal		Goal

29 April 1893	Newcastle United	5–0	Preston North End	Newcastle upon Tyne
	Sorley; Collins; Crate			Stadium: St James' Park; Attendance: 2,000
