= Bill Appleyard =

English footballer

Willie Appleyard
- Appleyard for Newcastle

Personal information
- Full name: Willie Appleyard
- Date of birth: 13 August 1878
- Place of birth: Caistor, England
- Date of death: 14 January 1958 (aged 79)
- Place of death: Newcastle, England
- Position: Centre forward

Senior career*
Years	Team	Apps	(Gls)
1901–1902	Grimsby Town	44	(19)
1902–1908	Newcastle United	126	(71)
1908	Oldham Athletic		
1908–1909	Grimsby Town	13	(2)
1909	Mansfield Mechanics		
- * Club domestic league appearances and goals

Willie Appleyard (13 August 1878 – 14 January 1958) was an English footballer, whose career at the highest level was cut short through injury.

== Football career ==
William Appleyard, born in Caistor, Lincolnshire, known as Bill or Willie, began his career at amateur outfit Cleethorpes before signing for Grimsby Town in 1901. Nicknamed Cockles, a reference to his previous job he had as a Grimsby fisherman, he joined the Mariners who had just been promoted from the second division and in the 1901–02 season, Appleyard scored 9 goals in 19 league appearances for Grimsby. In his second season he scored 10 in 25 league appearances as Grimsby finished bottom. Already relegated he signed for Newcastle United in April 1903, playing in two matches for the Magpies before the season ended.

In his first season on Tyneside, he scored 16 league goals in 31 matches and scored in his only FA Cup appearance that season. The following season Newcastle won the first division and finished runners up in the FA Cup. Appleyard scored 14 goals in 28 appearances in their successful league campaign and a further 2 goals in 5 FA Cup games on the way to the final. In the final Newcastle United lost 2–0 to Aston Villa. Another FA Cup Final followed the next season, double disappointment this time, as this time Newcastle United lost 1–0 against Everton. Not only the result but Appleyard, despite being United's top scorer hitting 6 goals in 5 games, was not selected for the final, Ronald Orr, who was omitted in last season's final, lined up instead. In the league however he scored 11 in 21 appearances as Newcastle finished fourth, eight points off champions Liverpool. The 1906-07 season saw Newcastle become champions once again, Appleyard bagging 17 goals in 23 appearances. The 1907-08 season was to be his last season for Newcastle, injury cutting short his impressive career. He still managed 13 goals in 23 league games and also scored 8 goals in 6 FA Cup matches, including becoming the first player to score a hat-trick for Newcastle in an FA Cup tie, ironically against his former club Grimsby Town on 7 March 1908. A third FA Cup final for Newcastle United in four years, Appleyard playing in his second, that saw the Magpies managing to score this time, but lost yet again, this time 3-1 to Wolverhampton Wanderers.

After playing 146 games for Newcastle and scoring an impressive 88 goals, injury enforced his departure from the club at the end of the season. Appleyard signed for second division Oldham Athletic, making only four appearances before making a return to Grimsby Town, also in the second division, during the 1908–09 season, where he scored 2 goals in 13 appearances. His return was brief, joining Mansfield Mechanics in 1909. He retired shortly afterwards and returned to Tyneside, working in Wallsend at the Vickers Shipbuilding yard.

He died on Tuesday 14 January 1958 at Newcastle General Hospital, aged 79.

== Honours ==
=== As a player ===
Newcastle United

- FA Cup finalist: 1905, 1908
- Football League champions: 1904–05 & 1906–07

== Resources ==
- A Complete Who's Who of Newcastle United, by Paul Joannou.
- Haway The Lads, The Illustrated Story of Newcastle United, by Paul Joannou, Tommy Canning/Patrick Canning
