= 2024–25 Newcastle United F.C. season =

132nd season in existence of Newcastle United FC

Newcastle United
2024–25 season
- Owner: Public Investment Fund (85%); RB Sports & Media (15%)
- Chairman: Yasir Al-Rumayyan
- Head coach: Eddie Howe
- Stadium: St James' Park
- Premier League: 5th
- FA Cup: Fifth round
- EFL Cup: Winners
- Top goalscorer: League: Alexander Isak (23); All: Alexander Isak (27)
- Average home league attendance: 52,187
- Biggest win: 5–0 v Crystal Palace (H) (16 April 2025, Premier League)
- Biggest defeat: 0–4 v Manchester City (A) (15 February 2025, Premier League)
Home colours	Away colours	Third colours

The 2024–25 season was the 132nd season in the history of Newcastle United Football Club, and their eighth consecutive season in the Premier League. In addition to the domestic league, the club also participated in the FA Cup and the EFL Cup.

On 16 March 2025, Newcastle defeated Liverpool in the final of the EFL Cup, winning their maiden trophy in this tournament, first major trophy since 1969, and first domestic trophy in 70 years. Newcastle also finished 5th in the Premier League, qualifying for the UEFA Champions League for the second time in three years.

== Squad ==
Note: Flags indicate national team as has been defined under FIFA eligibility rules. Players may hold more than one non-FIFA nationality.

Squad no.	Player	Nationality	Position(s)	Date of birth (age)	Signed in	Previous club
Goalkeepers
1	Martin Dúbravka	(Slovakia)	GK	15 January 1989 (aged 36)	2018 (Note: Dúbravka signed on loan in January 2018, which turned into a permanent deal in May 2018.)	(Czech Republic) Sparta Prague
19	Odysseas Vlachodimos	(Greece) (Note: Vlachodimos was born in Stuttgart, Germany.)	GK	26 April 1994 (aged 31)	2024	(England) Nottingham Forest
22	Nick Pope	(England)	GK	19 April 1992 (aged 33)	2022	(England) Burnley
26	John Ruddy	(England)	GK	24 October 1986 (aged 38)	2024	(England) Birmingham City
29	Mark Gillespie	(England)	GK	27 March 1992 (aged 33)	2020	(Scotland) Motherwell
Defenders
2	Kieran Trippier	(England)	RB	19 September 1990 (aged 34)	2022	(Spain) Atlético Madrid
4	Sven Botman	(Netherlands)	CB	12 January 2000 (aged 25)	2022	(France) Lille
5	Fabian Schär	(Switzerland)	CB	20 December 1991 (aged 33)	2018	(Spain) Deportivo La Coruña
6	Jamaal Lascelles	(England)	CB	11 November 1993 (aged 31)	2014	(England) Nottingham Forest
13	Matt Targett	(England)	LB / LWB	18 September 1995 (aged 29)	2022 (Note: Targett signed on loan in January 2022, which turned into a permanent deal in June 2022.)	(England) Aston Villa
17	Emil Krafth	(Sweden)	RB / CB	2 August 1994 (aged 30)	2019	(France) Amiens
20	Lewis Hall	(England)	LB / LWB / CM	8 September 2004 (aged 20)	2023 (Note: Hall signed on loan in August 2023, which turned into a permanent deal in July 2024.)	(England) Chelsea
21	Tino Livramento	(England)	RB / LB	12 November 2002 (aged 22)	2023	(England) Southampton
33	Dan Burn	(England)	CB / LB	9 May 1992 (aged 33)	2022	(England) Brighton & Hove Albion
Midfielders
7	Joelinton	(Brazil)	CM / LW / ST	16 August 1996 (aged 28)	2019	(Germany) 1899 Hoffenheim
8	Sandro Tonali	(Italy)	DM / CM	8 May 2000 (aged 25)	2023	(Italy) Milan
10	Anthony Gordon	(England)	LW / RW / AM / ST	24 February 2001 (aged 24)	2023	(England) Everton
11	Harvey Barnes	(England)	LW	9 December 1997 (aged 27)	2023	(England) Leicester City
23	Jacob Murphy	(England)	RW / RWB / LW	24 February 1995 (aged 30)	2017	(England) Norwich City
28	Joe Willock	(England)	CM / AM	20 August 1999 (aged 25)	2021	(England) Arsenal
36	Sean Longstaff	(England)	CM	30 September 1997 (aged 27)	2016	Academy
39	Bruno Guimarães	(Brazil)	CM / DM	16 November 1997 (aged 27)	2022	(France) Lyon
67	Lewis Miley	(England)	CM / DM	1 May 2006 (aged 19)	2023	Academy
Forwards
9	Callum Wilson	(England)	ST	27 February 1992 (aged 33)	2020	(England) Bournemouth
14	Alexander Isak	(Sweden)	ST	21 December 1999 (aged 25)	2022	(Spain) Real Sociedad
18	William Osula	(Denmark)	ST / RW / LW	4 August 2003 (aged 21)	2024	(England) Sheffield United
Reserves and Academy players who are currently or were previously with the first-team squad
12	Jamal Lewis	(Northern Ireland) (Note: Lewis was born in Luton, England.)	LB / LWB	25 January 1998 (aged 27)	2020	(England) Norwich City
32	Garang Kuol	(Australia) (Note: Kuol was born in Cairo, Egypt.)	LW / RW / ST	15 September 2004 (aged 20)	2023	(Australia) Central Coast Mariners
44	Ben Parkinson	(England)	ST / RW / LW	10 March 2005 (aged 20)	2023	Academy
73	Aidan Harris	(England)	GK	16 December 2006 (aged 18)	2023	Academy
74	Adam Harrison	(England)	GK	20 October 2006 (aged 18)	2023	Academy
75	Trevan Sanusi	(England)	LW / RW	25 April 2007 (aged 18)	2023	(England) Birmingham City
76	Leo Shahar	(England)	RB	18 March 2007 (aged 18)	2023	(England) Wolverhampton Wanderers
78	Sean Neave	(England)	ST	27 May 2007 (aged 18)	2024	Academy
Out on Loan
25	Lloyd Kelly	(England)	CB / LB	6 October 1998 (aged 26)	2024	(England) Bournemouth
30	Harrison Ashby	(Scotland) (Note: Ashby was born in Milton Keynes, England.)	RB	14 November 2001 (aged 23)	2023	(England) West Ham United
31	Max Thompson	(England)	GK	1 August 2004 (aged 20)	2023	Academy
37	Alex Murphy	(Republic of Ireland)	LB / CB	25 June 2004 (aged 21)	2022	(Republic of Ireland) Galway United
38	James Huntley	(England)	CM	2 March 2004 (aged 21)	2023	Academy
40	Joe White	(England)	AM / CM	1 October 2002 (aged 22)	2021	Academy
49	Travis Hernes	(Norway)	CM	4 November 2005 (aged 19)	2023	(England) Shrewsbury Town
—	Isaac Hayden	(Jamaica) (Note: Hayden was born in Chelmsford, England.)	CM / DM / CB	22 March 1995 (aged 30)	2016	(England) Arsenal

== Transfers ==
=== Transfers in ===
Date	Position	Player	From	Fee	Ref.
First team
30 June 2024	GK	(Greece) Odysseas Vlachodimos	(England) Nottingham Forest	Undisclosed	
1 July 2024 (Note: The transfer was announced on 13 June and became official on 1 July once his Bournemouth contract expired.)	CB	(England) Lloyd Kelly	(England) Bournemouth	Free Transfer	
1 July 2024	LB	(England) Lewis Hall	(England) Chelsea	£28,000,000	
1 July 2024	GK	(England) John Ruddy	(England) Birmingham City	Free Transfer	
8 August 2024	CF	(Denmark) William Osula	(England) Sheffield United	£15,000,000	
Academy
20 July 2024	CB	(Serbia) Miodrag Pivaš	(Serbia) FK Jedinstvo Ub	Undisclosed	
12 February 2025	LW	(Republic of Ireland) Kyle Fitzgerald	(Republic of Ireland) Galway United	Undisclosed	

=== Transfers out ===
Date	Position	Player	To	Fee	Ref.
First team
30 June 2024	AM	(England) Elliot Anderson	(England) Nottingham Forest	£35,000,000	
30 June 2024	RW	(The Gambia) Yankuba Minteh	(England) Brighton & Hove Albion	£30,000,000	
30 August 2024	LW	(Scotland) Ryan Fraser	(England) Southampton	Free Transfer	
30 January 2025	RW	(Paraguay) Miguel Almirón	(United States) Atlanta United	£11,000,000	
Academy
30 January 2025	CM	(England) Jamie Miley	(England) Hartlepool United	Free Transfer	

=== Loans out ===
Date from	Position	Player	To	Date until	Ref.
First team
3 February 2025	CB	(England) Lloyd Kelly	(Italy) Juventus	End of Season	
30 August 2024	RB	(Scotland) Harrison Ashby	(England) Queens Park Rangers	End of Season	
30 August 2024	AM	(England) Joe White	(England) Milton Keynes Dons	End of Season	
3 September 2024	LB	(Northern Ireland) Jamal Lewis	(Brazil) São Paulo	1 January 2025 (Note: On 1 January 2025, Jamal Lewis returned from his loan spell at São Paulo. His loan was originally due to expire at the end of the season.)	
10 January 2025	DM	(Jamaica) Isaac Hayden	(England) Portsmouth	End of Season	
Academy
29 August 2024	CM	(England) Jamie Miley	(Wales) Newport County	13 January 2025 (Note: On 13 January 2025, Jamie Miley returned from his loan spell at Newport County. His loan was originally due to expire at the end of the season.)	
29 August 2024	GK	(England) Max Thompson	(England) Chesterfield	End of Season	
2 September 2024	CB	(Serbia) Miodrag Pivaš	(Netherlands) Willem II	End of Season	
16 January 2025	CB	(Scotland) Charlie McArthur	(England) Carlisle United	End of Season	
17 January 2025	CM	(Norway) Travis Hernes	(Denmark) AaB	End of Season	
20 January 2025	LB	(Republic of Ireland) Alex Murphy	(England) Bolton Wanderers	End of Season	
4 February 2025	CM	(England) James Huntley	(England) Spennymoor Town	End of Season	

=== Released / Out of Contract ===
Date	Position	Player	Subsequent club	Join date	Ref.
First team
30 June 2024	RM	(Scotland) Matt Ritchie	(England) Portsmouth	6 August 2024	
30 June 2024	LB	(Wales) Paul Dummett	(England) Wigan Athletic	8 November 2024	
30 June 2024	GK	(Germany) Loris Karius	(Germany) Schalke 04	14 January 2025	
30 June 2024	CM	(Republic of Ireland) Jeff Hendrick	(England) Derby County	7 March 2025	
Academy
30 June 2024	LW	(England) Kyle Crossley	(England) South Shields	1 July 2024	
30 June 2024	CB	(England) Carter Milmore	(England) Gateshead	1 July 2024	
30 June 2024	GK	(Scotland) Jude Smith	(England) Carlisle United	1 July 2024	
30 June 2024	CF	(England) Dylan Stephenson	(England) Dagenham & Redbridge	1 July 2024	
30 June 2024	CB	(England) Kelland Watts	(England) Cambridge United	1 July 2024	
30 June 2024	LB	(England) Jordan Hackett	(England) Mousehole	16 August 2024	
30 June 2024	CF	(England) Michael Ndiweni	(England) Ashington	19 August 2024	
30 June 2024	LW	(England) Amadou Diallo	(France) Bordeaux	13 September 2024	
30 June 2024	CF	(England) Shaun Mavididi	(England) Fleetwood Town	18 October 2024	
30 June 2024	CM	(Scotland) Lucas De Bolle	(England) South Shields	1 November 2024	
30 June 2024	LB	(England) Matthew Bondswell	(England) Hartlepool United	15 November 2024	
30 June 2024	AM	(Peru) Rodrigo Vilca	(Peru) Atlético Grau	1 January 2025	
January 2025	GK	(Poland) Adrian Janusz	(England) Brentford	25 March 2025	
30 June 2024	GK	(England) Will Brown			
30 June 2024	GK	(England) Taylor Ross			

== Pre-season and friendlies ==
On 14 May, Newcastle United announced they would travel to Japan for a pre-season training camp, and to face Urawa Red Diamonds and Yokohama F. Marinos, as part of the J.League International Series. In June, a third friendly was confirmed, against Hull City. On 2 July, it was confirmed that the 2024 Sela Cup would take place at St James' Park during the second weekend of August, with Newcastle competing against Girona and Brest on 9 and 10 August, respectively.

Win Draw Loss Fixtures

20 July 2024 Friendly	SpVgg Unterhaching	1–3	Newcastle United	Herzogenaurach, Germany
12:00 CEST (11:00 BST)	Skarlatidis 83' (pen.)	Report	Barnes 5'; Murphy 24'; Isak 43'	Stadium: Adidas Global Headquarters; Attendance: 0

27 July 2024 Friendly	Hull City	0–2	Newcastle United	Kingston upon Hull
14:00 BST		Report	Isak 32'; Murphy 43'	Stadium: MKM Stadium; Attendance: 13,670

31 July 2024 J.League International Series	Urawa Red Diamonds	1–4	Newcastle United	Saitama, Japan
19:30 JST (11:30 BST)	Nitta 23'; Ito (penalty missed) 30'	Report	Isak 3'; Murphy 45', 47'; Hall 58'	Stadium: Saitama Stadium 2002; Attendance: 13,763

3 August 2024 J.League International Series	Yokohama F. Marinos	2–0	Newcastle United	Tokyo, Japan
19:00 JST (11:00 BST)	Élber 34'; Amano 51'	Report	Kelly (yellow card) 43'; Parkinson (yellow card) 66'	Stadium: Japan National Stadium; Attendance: 38,201; Referee: Yusuke Araki (Japan)

9 August 2024 Sela Cup	Newcastle United	4–0	Girona	Newcastle upon Tyne
19:30 BST	Longstaff 2', 38'; Murphy 13'; Gordon 15'; Isak (penalty missed) 21'	Report		Stadium: St James' Park; Attendance: 31,958; Referee: Michael Oliver (England)

10 August 2024 Sela Cup	Newcastle United	1–0	Brest	Newcastle upon Tyne
16:00 BST	Barnes 15'	Report		Stadium: St James' Park

== Competitions ==
=== Overall record ===
Competition	First match	Last match	Starting round	Final position	Record							
Competition	First match	Last match	Starting round	Final position	Pld	W	D	L	GF	GA	GD	Win %
Premier League	17 August 2024	25 May 2025	Matchday 1	5th	38	20	6	12	68	47	+21	52.63
FA Cup	12 January 2025	2 March 2025	Third round	Fifth round	3	2	0	1	7	5	+2	66.67
EFL Cup	28 August 2024	16 March 2025	Second round	Winners	7	6	1	0	13	3	+10	85.71
Total					48	28	7	13	88	55	+33	58.33

Source: Soccerway

=== Premier League ===
==== League table ====
Pos	Team	Pld	W	D	L	GF	GA	GD	Pts	Qualification or relegation
3	Manchester City	38	21	8	9	72	44	+28	71	Qualification for the Champions League league phase (Note: The Premier League gained an additional Champions League place as a result of England gaining one of the two European Performance Spots (EPS) awarded to the two associations with the highest UEFA coefficient points in 2024–25.)
4	Chelsea	38	20	9	9	64	43	+21	69	Qualification for the Champions League league phase
5	Newcastle United	38	20	6	12	68	47	+21	66	Qualification for the Champions League league phase
6	Aston Villa	38	19	9	10	58	51	+7	66	Qualification for the Europa League league phase (Note: Initially, Crystal Palace qualified for the Europa League league phase as the 2024–25 FA Cup winners. However, due to multi-club ownership rules, they were not permitted to enter the Europa League and entered the Conference League play-off round instead, with 7th-placed Nottingham Forest taking their place in the Europa League. Crystal Palace appealed the decision but this was ultimately rejected.)
7	Nottingham Forest	38	19	8	11	58	46	+12	65	Qualification for the Europa League league phase

Source: Premier League
Rules for classification: 1) Points; 2) Goal difference; 3) Goals scored; 4) If the champions, relegated teams or qualified teams for UEFA competitions cannot be determined by rules 1 to 3, rules 4.1 to 4.3 are applied – 4.1) Points gained in head-to-head record between such teams; 4.2) Away goals scored in head-to-head record between such teams; 4.3) Play-offs

==== Results summary ====
Overall								Home						Away					
Pld	W	D	L	GF	GA	GD	Pts	W	D	L	GF	GA	GD	W	D	L	GF	GA	GD
38	20	6	12	68	47	+21	66	12	2	5	40	20	+20	8	4	7	28	27	+1

Source: Soccerway

==== Results by round ====
Round	1	2	3	4	5	6	7	8	9	10	11	12	13	14	15	16	17	18	19	20	21	22	23	24	25	26	27	28	30	31	32	29^{1}	33	34	35	36	37	38
Ground	H	A	H	A	A	H	A	H	A	H	A	H	A	H	A	H	A	H	A	A	H	H	A	H	A	H	A	A	H	A	H	H	A	H	A	H	A	H
Result	W	D	W	W	L	D	D	L	L	W	W	L	D	D	L	W	W	W	W	W	W	L	W	L	L	W	L	W	W	W	W	W	L	W	D	W	L	L
Position	8	6	5	3	6	7	7	9	12	11	8	10	11	12	12	12	8	5	5	5	4	6	5	6	7	5	6	6	6	5	4	3	4	3	4	3	4	5
Points	3	4	7	10	10	11	12	12	12	15	18	18	19	20	20	23	26	29	32	35	38	38	41	41	41	44	44	47	50	53	56	59	59	62	63	66	66	66

Source: Soccerway
A = Away; H = Home; W = Win; D = Draw; L = Loss; P = Postponed
Notes:
- ^{1} Matchday 29 (v Crystal Palace) was postponed due to Newcastle's EFL Cup final involvement.

==== Matches ====
On 18 June, the Premier League fixtures were released.

Win Draw Loss Fixtures

17 August 2024 1	Newcastle United	1–0	Southampton	Newcastle upon Tyne
15:00 BST	Hall (yellow card) 9'; Schär (red card) 28'; Joelinton 45'; Burn (yellow card) 74'	Report	Brereton (yellow card) 28'; Stephens (yellow card) 45+3'; Harwood-Bellis (yellow card) 73'; Edozie (yellow card) 90+4'	Stadium: St James' Park; Attendance: 52,196; Referee: Craig Pawson

25 August 2024 2	Bournemouth	1–1	Newcastle United	Bournemouth
14:00 BST	Christie (yellow card) 13'; Tavernier 37'; Senesi (yellow card) 88'	Report	Gordon 77'; Burn (yellow card) 89'; Joelinton (yellow card) 90+6'	Stadium: Vitality Stadium; Attendance: 11,161; Referee: David Coote
Note: Fixture was initially scheduled for 24 August, but was moved for live Sky Sports broadcast.

1 September 2024 3	Newcastle United	2–1	Tottenham Hotspur	Newcastle upon Tyne
13:30 BST	Kelly (yellow card) 28'; Barnes 37'; Longstaff (yellow card) 41'; Joelinton (yellow card) 45+2'; Bruno Guimarães (yellow card) 58'; Isak 78'	Report	Sarr (yellow card) 34'; Bissouma (yellow card) 48'; Burn 56' (o.g.); Maddison (yellow card) 68'; Bentancur (yellow card) 84'	Stadium: St James' Park; Attendance: 52,211; Referee: Robert Jones
Note: Fixture was initially scheduled for 31 August, but was moved for live Sky Sports broadcast.

15 September 2024 4	Wolverhampton Wanderers	1–2	Newcastle United	Wolverhampton
16:30 BST	Lemina 36'; Aït-Nouri (yellow card) 63'; Semedo (yellow card) 70'; André (yellow card) 73'	Report	Joelinton (yellow card) 38'; Burn (yellow card) 52'; Schär 75'; Barnes 80'; Murphy (yellow card) 90+6'	Stadium: Molineux Stadium; Attendance: 30,255; Referee: Chris Kavanagh
Note: Fixture was initially scheduled for a 15:00 kick-off, but was moved for live Sky Sports broadcast.

21 September 2024 5	Fulham	3–1	Newcastle United	Fulham
15:00 BST	Jiménez 5'; Tete (yellow card) 21'; Smith Rowe 22'; Lukić (yellow card) 28'; Traoré (yellow card) 36'; Pereira (yellow card) 44'; Reed (yellow card) 86'; Leno (yellow card) 90+2'; Nelson 90+2'	Report	Barnes 46'	Stadium: Craven Cottage; Attendance: 25,700; Referee: Peter Bankes

28 September 2024 6	Newcastle United	1–1	Manchester City	Newcastle upon Tyne
12:30 BST	Schär (yellow card) 26'; Bruno Guimarães (yellow card) 32'; Gordon 58' (pen.); Tonali (yellow card) 62'; Joelinton (yellow card) 63'	Report	Gvardiol 35'; Ederson (yellow card) 56'; Kovačić (yellow card) 60'; Grealish (yellow card) 62'; Dias (yellow card) 90'	Stadium: St James' Park; Attendance: 52,248; Referee: Jarred Gillett
Note: Fixture was initially scheduled for a 15:00 kick-off, but was moved for live TNT Sports broadcast.

5 October 2024 7	Everton	0–0	Newcastle United	Liverpool
17:30 BST	McNeil (yellow card) 44'	Report	Gordon (penalty missed) 35'; Hall (yellow card) 84'; Schär (yellow card) 90+3'	Stadium: Goodison Park; Attendance: 39,265; Referee: Craig Pawson
Note: Fixture was initially scheduled for a 15:00 kick-off, but was moved for live Sky Sports broadcast.

19 October 2024 8	Newcastle United	0–1	Brighton & Hove Albion	Newcastle upon Tyne
15:00 BST	Burn (yellow card) 10'; Hall (yellow card) 37'	Report	Welbeck 35'; Ayari (yellow card) 45'; Hinshelwood (yellow card) 71'	Stadium: St James' Park; Attendance: 52,220; Referee: Peter Bankes

27 October 2024 9	Chelsea	2–1	Newcastle United	Fulham
14:00 BST	Fofana (yellow card) 11'; Jackson 18'; Palmer 47'; Lavia (yellow card) 54'; Madueke (yellow card) 66'; Sánchez (yellow card) 84'; Neto (yellow card) 88'; Nkunku (yellow card) 90+4'	Report	Schär (yellow card) 22'; Isak 32'; Tonali (yellow card) 64'; Longstaff (yellow card) 90'	Stadium: Stamford Bridge; Attendance: 39,526; Referee: Simon Hooper
Note: Fixture was initially scheduled for 26 October, but was moved for live Sky Sports broadcast.

2 November 2024 10	Newcastle United	1–0	Arsenal	Newcastle upon Tyne
12:30 GMT	Isak 12'; Schär (yellow card) 39'; Willock (yellow card) 62'; Tonali (yellow card) 71'; Pope (yellow card) 90+4'	Report	Merino (yellow card) 56'; Timber (yellow card) 66'; Jorginho (yellow card) 88'; Havertz (yellow card) 90+7'	Stadium: St James' Park; Attendance: 52,249; Referee: John Brooks
Note: Fixture was initially scheduled for a 15:00 kick-off, but was moved for live TNT Sports broadcast.

10 November 2024 11	Nottingham Forest	1–3	Newcastle United	West Bridgford
14:00 GMT	Murillo 21'; Yates (yellow card) 65'	Report	Burn (yellow card) 7'; Isak 54'; Joelinton 72'; Barnes 83'	Stadium: City Ground; Attendance: 30,145; Referee: Anthony Taylor
Note: Fixture was initially scheduled for 9 November, but was moved for live Sky Sports broadcast.

25 November 2024 12	Newcastle United	0–2	West Ham United	Newcastle upon Tyne
20:00 GMT	Kelly (yellow card) 61'	Report	Souček 10'; Wan-Bissaka 53'	Stadium: St James' Park; Attendance: 52,094; Referee: Craig Pawson
Note: Fixture was initially scheduled for 23 November, but was moved for live Sky Sports broadcast.

30 November 2024 13	Crystal Palace	1–1	Newcastle United	Selhurst
15:00 GMT	Lerma (yellow card) 59'; Mitchell (yellow card) 87'; Guéhi (yellow card) 88'; Muñoz 90+4'	Report	Guéhi 53' (o.g.); Gordon (yellow card) 53'; Willock (yellow card) 64'; Wilson (yellow card) 89'	Stadium: Selhurst Park; Attendance: 25,101; Referee: Darren England

4 December 2024 14	Newcastle United	3–3	Liverpool	Newcastle upon Tyne
19:30 GMT	Isak 35'; Tonali (yellow card) 58'; Gordon 62'; Schär 90'; Pope (yellow card) 90+6'	Report	Mac Allister (yellow card) 20'; Quansah (yellow card) 42'; Gravenberch (yellow card) 45'; Jones 50'; Salah 68', 83'; Alexander-Arnold (yellow card) 69'; Núñez (yellow card) 71'	Stadium: St James' Park; Attendance: 52,237; Referee: Andrew Madley
Note: Fixture was initially scheduled for a 19:45 kick-off, but was moved for live Amazon Prime Video broadcasting.

7 December 2024 15	Brentford	4–2	Newcastle United	Brentford
15:00 BST	Mbeumo 8'; Wissa 28'; Lewis-Potter (yellow card) 45+3'; Collins 56'; Van den Berg (yellow card) 67'; Flekken (yellow card) 88'; Schade 90'	Report	Isak 11'; Barnes 32'	Stadium: Brentford Community Stadium; Attendance: 17,078; Referee: Simon Hooper

14 December 2024 16	Newcastle United	4–0	Leicester City	Newcastle upon Tyne
15:00 GMT	Murphy 30', 60', (yellow card) 35'; Bruno Guimarães (yellow card) 39', (goal) 47'; Isak 50'; Joelinton (yellow card) 71'	Report	Skipp (yellow card) 20'; Vestergaard (yellow card) 90+2'; Okoli (yellow card) 90+6'	Stadium: St James' Park; Attendance: 52,235; Referee: Thomas Bramall

21 December 2024 17	Ipswich Town	0–4	Newcastle United	Ipswich
15:00 GMT	Morsy (yellow card) 65'; Al-Hamadi (yellow card) 76'	Report	Isak 1', 45+2', 54'; Murphy 32'	Stadium: Portman Road; Attendance: 29,774; Referee: Stuart Attwell

26 December 2024 18	Newcastle United	3–0	Aston Villa	Newcastle upon Tyne
15:00 GMT	Gordon 2'; Trippier (yellow card) 23'; Joelinton (yellow card) 45', (goal) 90+1'; Isak 59'	Report	Cash (yellow card) 14'; Durán (red card) 32'	Stadium: St James' Park; Attendance: 52,168; Referee: Anthony Taylor
Note: Fixture broadcast live on Amazon Prime Video.

30 December 2024 19	Manchester United	0–2	Newcastle United	Trafford
20:00 GMT	Martínez (yellow card) 61'	Report	Isak 4'; Joelinton 19'; Schär (yellow card) 81'	Stadium: Old Trafford; Attendance: 73,809; Referee: Simon Hooper
Note: Fixture was initially scheduled for 29 December, but was moved for live Sky Sports broadcasting.

4 January 2025 20	Tottenham Hotspur	1–2	Newcastle United	Tottenham
12:30 GMT	Solanke 4'; Reguilón (yellow card) 90+9'	Report	Gordon 6'; Burn (yellow card) 17'; Isak 38', (yellow card) 86'; Joelinton (yellow card) 73'; Botman (yellow card) 80'	Stadium: Tottenham Hotspur Stadium; Attendance: 61,293; Referee: Andrew Madley
Note: Fixture was initially scheduled for a 15:00 kick-off, but was moved for live TNT Sports broadcasting.

15 January 2025 21	Newcastle United	3–0	Wolverhampton Wanderers	Newcastle upon Tyne
19:30 GMT	Isak 34', 57'; Gordon 74'	Report	Doherty (yellow card) 26'; Agbadou (yellow card) 85'	Stadium: St James' Park; Attendance: 51,975; Referee: Darren England
Note: Fixture was initially scheduled for a 19:45 kick-off, but was moved for live TNT Sports broadcasting.

18 January 2025 22	Newcastle United	1–4	Bournemouth	Newcastle
12:30 GMT	Bruno Guimarães 25'; Joelinton (yellow card) 45+5'	Report	Kluivert 6', 44', 90+2', (yellow card) 45+6'; Adams (yellow card) 45+5'; Christie (yellow card) 70'; Ouattara (yellow card) 77'; Jebbison (yellow card) 90+3'; Kerkez 90+6', (yellow card) 90+7'	Stadium: St James' Park; Attendance: 52,227; Referee: Stuart Attwell
Note: Fixture was initially scheduled for a 15:00 kick-off, but was moved for live TNT Sports broadcasting.

25 January 2025 23	Southampton	1–3	Newcastle United	Southampton
15:00 GMT	Bednarek 10'; Fernandes (yellow card) 21'	Report	Isak 26' (pen.), 30'; Tonali 51'	Stadium: St Mary's Stadium; Attendance: 31,141; Referee: Sam Barrott

1 February 2025 24	Newcastle United	1–2	Fulham	Newcastle upon Tyne
15:00 GMT	Burn (yellow card) 35'; Murphy 37'; Joelinton (yellow card) 45+3'; Tonali (yellow card) 78'; Gordon (yellow card) 81'	Report	Andersen (yellow card) 17'; Robinson (yellow card) 20'; Jiménez 61'; Muniz 82'; Pereira (yellow card) 85'; Leno (yellow card) 90+2'	Stadium: St James' Park; Attendance: 52,173; Referee: Chris Kavanagh

15 February 2025 25	Manchester City	4–0	Newcastle United	Manchester
15:00 GMT	Marmoush 19', 24', 33'; McAtee 84'	Report	Bruno Guimarães (yellow card) 50'	Stadium: Etihad Stadium; Attendance: 52,432; Referee: Andrew Madley

23 February 2025 26	Newcastle United	4–3	Nottingham Forest	Newcastle upon Tyne
14:00 GMT	Miley 23'; Murphy 25'; Isak 33' (pen.), 34'; Livramento (yellow card) 55'	Report	Hudson-Odoi 6'; Milenković (yellow card) 45+2', (goal) 63'; Anderson (yellow card) 52'; Domínguez (yellow card) 74'; Yates 90', (yellow card) 90+2'	Stadium: St James' Park; Attendance: 52,223; Referee: Jarred Gillett
Note: Fixture was initially scheduled for 22 February, but was moved for live Sky Sports broadcasting.

26 February 2025 27	Liverpool	2–0	Newcastle United	Liverpool
20:15 GMT	Szoboszlai 11'; Mac Allister 63'	Report	Murphy (yellow card) 80'	Stadium: Anfield; Attendance: 60,374; Referee: Chris Kavanagh
Note: Fixture was initially scheduled for a 19:45 kick-off, but was moved for live TNT Sports broadcasting.

10 March 2025 28	West Ham United	0–1	Newcastle United	Stratford
20:00 GMT		Report	Bruno Guimarães 63'; Burn (yellow card) 84'	Stadium: London Stadium; Attendance: 62,463; Referee: Michael Salisbury
Note: Fixture was initially scheduled for 8 March, but was moved for live Sky Sports broadcasting.

2 April 2025 30	Newcastle United	2–1	Brentford	Newcastle upon Tyne
19:45 BST	Isak 45+2'; Schär (yellow card) 70'; Tonali 74'	Report	Mbeumo 66' (pen.); Lewis-Potter (yellow card) 72'	Stadium: St James' Park; Attendance: 52,021; Referee: Peter Bankes

7 April 2025 31	Leicester City	0–3	Newcastle United	Leicester
20:00 BST	Ndidi (yellow card) 14'; Justin (yellow card) 47'	Report	Murphy 2', 11'; Barnes 34'	Stadium: King Power Stadium; Attendance: 30,403; Referee: Robert Jones
Note: Fixture was initially scheduled for 5 April, but was moved for live Sky Sports broadcasting.

13 April 2025 32	Newcastle United	4–1	Manchester United	Newcastle upon Tyne
16:30 BST	Tonali 24'; Barnes 49', 64'; Bruno Guimarães 77'	Report	Ugarte (yellow card) 16'; Garnacho 37'; Yoro (yellow card) 43'	Stadium: St James' Park; Attendance: 52,252; Referee: Chris Kavanagh
Note: Fixture was initially scheduled for 12 April, but was moved for live Sky Sports broadcasting.

16 April 2025 29	Newcastle United	5–0	Crystal Palace	Newcastle upon Tyne
19:30 BST	Murphy 14'; Guéhi 38' (o.g.); Barnes 45+2'; Schär 45+8'; Isak 58'; Burn (yellow card) 60'; Bruno Guimarães (yellow card) 67'	Report	Eze (penalty missed) 36'; Hughes (yellow card) 51'; Lerma (yellow card) 60'; Muñoz (yellow card) 78'	Stadium: St James' Park; Attendance: 52,197; Referee: Darren England
Note: Fixture was initially scheduled for 15 March, but was rearranged due to Newcastle's involvement in the EFL Cup final.

19 April 2025 33	Aston Villa	4–1	Newcastle United	Birmingham
17:30 BST	Watkins 1'; Maatsen 64'; Burn 73' (o.g.); Onana 75'; Ramsey (yellow card) 88'	Report	Schär (yellow card) 13', (goal) 18'; Joelinton (yellow card) 41'; Bruno Guimarães (yellow card) 63'	Stadium: Villa Park; Attendance: 42,618; Referee: Jarred Gillett
Note: Fixture was initially scheduled for a 15:00 kick-off, but was moved for live Sky Sports broadcasting.

26 April 2025 34	Newcastle United	3–0	Ipswich Town	Newcastle
15:00 BST	Burn (yellow card) 44', (goal) 56'; Isak 45+4' (pen.); Osula 80'	Report	Johnson (yellow card) 30' (yellow-red card) 37'; Delap (yellow card) 44'; Greaves (yellow card) 63'	Stadium: St James' Park; Attendance: 52,171; Referee: Michael Salisbury

4 May 2025 35	Brighton & Hove Albion	1–1	Newcastle United	Brighton and Hove
14:00 BST	Minteh 28'; Wieffer (yellow card) 32'; Welbeck (yellow card) 90+3'	Report	Willock (yellow card) 72'; Isak 89' (pen.)	Stadium: Falmer Stadium; Attendance: 31,580; Referee: Craig Pawson
Note: Fixture was initially scheduled for 3 May, but was moved for live Sky Sports broadcasting.

11 May 2025 36	Newcastle United	2–0	Chelsea	Newcastle upon Tyne
12:00 BST	Tonali 2'; Schär (yellow card) 53'; Murphy (yellow card) 64'; Bruno Guimarães (yellow card) 84', (goal) 90'; Krafth (yellow card) 89'	Report	Jackson (red card) 35'; Fernández (yellow card) 45+5'; Colwill (yellow card) 90+3'	Stadium: St James' Park; Attendance: 52,231; Referee: John Brooks
Note: Fixture was initially scheduled for 10 May, but was moved for live TNT Sports broadcasting.

18 May 2025 37	Arsenal	1–0	Newcastle United	Holloway
16:30 BST	Rice 55'; Raya (yellow card) 90+4'; Havertz (yellow card) 90+4'; Kiwior (yellow card) 90+8'	Report	Krafth (yellow card) 64'; Willock (yellow card) 90+3'; Burn (yellow card) 90+8'	Stadium: Emirates Stadium; Attendance: 60,160; Referee: Simon Hooper
Note: Fixture was initially scheduled for a 15:00 kick-off, but was moved for live Sky Sports broadcasting.

25 May 2025 38	Newcastle United	0–1	Everton	Newcastle upon Tyne
16:00 BST	Schär (yellow card) 38'	Report	Gueye (yellow card) 24'; Alcaraz 65'; Young (yellow card) 77'; Mykolenko (yellow card) 81'; Garner (yellow card) 83'	Stadium: St James' Park; Attendance: 52,221; Referee: Tony Harrington

=== FA Cup ===
Newcastle entered the FA Cup in the third round, and were drawn at home to Bromley. In the fourth round, they were drawn away to Birmingham City. In the fifth round, they were drawn at home to fellow Premier League side Brighton & Hove Albion.

Win Draw Loss Fixtures

12 January 2025 Third round	Newcastle United	3–1	Bromley	Newcastle upon Tyne
15:00 GMT	Miley 16'; Gordon 49' (pen.); Osula 61'	Report	Congreve 8'	Stadium: St James' Park; Attendance: 52,088; Referee: Will Finnie

8 February 2025 Fourth round	Birmingham City	2–3	Newcastle United	Birmingham
17:45 GMT	Laird 1'; Iwata 40'; Anderson (yellow card) 45+3'; Stansfield (yellow card) 66'; Klarer (yellow card) 71'; Willumson (yellow card) 75'	Report	Burn (yellow card) 14'; Willock 21', 82', (yellow card) 68'; Wilson 26'; Isak (yellow card) 45+3'	Stadium: St Andrew's; Attendance: 27,994; Referee: Matt Donohue

2 March 2025 Fifth round	Newcastle United	1–2 (a.e.t.)	Brighton & Hove Albion	Newcastle upon Tyne
13:45 GMT	Isak 22' (pen.); Joelinton (yellow card) 36'; Gordon (red card) 83'	Report	Lamptey (yellow card) 29' (yellow-red card) 90+1'; Webster (yellow card) 35'; Minteh 44'; Baleba (yellow card) 45+2'; Gómez (yellow card) 92'; Welbeck 114'	Stadium: St James' Park; Attendance: 51,566; Referee: Anthony Taylor

=== EFL Cup ===
As a Premier League club not involved in any European competitions, Newcastle entered the EFL Cup in the second round, and were drawn away to fellow Premier League side Nottingham Forest. In the third round, they were drawn away to AFC Wimbledon. In the fourth round and quarter-finals, they were drawn at home to Chelsea and Brentford respectively. A two-legged tie versus Arsenal, away then at home was drawn in the semi-finals. Newcastle faced Liverpool in the final at Wembley Stadium, winning 2–1 for a first major trophy since 1969.

Win Draw Loss Fixtures

28 August 2024 Second round	Nottingham Forest	1–1 (3–4 p)	Newcastle United	West Bridgford
20:00 BST	Silva 50', (yellow card) 53'; Abbott (yellow card) 54'; Moreno (yellow card) 72'; Domínguez (yellow card) 77'; Sangaré (yellow card) 88'	Report	Willock 1'; Bruno Guimarães (yellow card) 53'; Hall (yellow card) 67'	Stadium: City Ground; Attendance: 23,083; Referee: Sam Allison
	Penalties
	Hudson-Odoi (penalty scored); Milenković (penalty scored); Williams (penalty scored); Sangaré (penalty missed); Awoniyi (penalty missed)		(penalty scored) Isak; (penalty missed) Joelinton; (penalty scored) Bruno Guimarães; (penalty scored) Gordon; (penalty scored) Longstaff

1 October 2024 Third round	Newcastle United	1–0	AFC Wimbledon	Newcastle upon Tyne
19:45 BST	Schär 45+1' (pen.); Longstaff (yellow card) 55'	Report	Biler (yellow card) 45'; Hippolyte (yellow card) 52'	Stadium: St James' Park; Attendance: 51,739; Referee: Darren Bond
Note: Fixture was initially scheduled to be hosted by Wimbledon on 24 September, but was postponed and switched to Newcastle due to flooding at Wimbledon's stadium, Plough Lane.

30 October 2024 Fourth round	Newcastle United	2–0	Chelsea	Newcastle upon Tyne
19:45 BST	Schär (yellow card) 16'; Longstaff (yellow card) 19'; Isak 23'; Disasi 26' (o.g.); Gordon (yellow card) 52'; Pope (yellow card) 55'	Report	Badiashile (yellow card) 29'; Félix (yellow card) 85'	Stadium: St James' Park; Attendance: 51,934; Referee: Chris Kavanagh

18 December 2024 Quarter-finals	Newcastle United	3–1	Brentford	Newcastle upon Tyne
19:45 GMT	Tonali 9', 43'; Schär (yellow card) 17', (goal) 69'; Bruno Guimarães (yellow card) 38'; Livramento (yellow card) 45+1'	Report	Collins (yellow card) 31'; Wissa 90+1'	Stadium: St James' Park; Attendance: 51,765; Referee: Sam Barrott

7 January 2025 Semi-finals First leg	Arsenal	0–2	Newcastle United	Holloway
20:00 GMT	Zinchenko (yellow card) 81'	Report	Isak 37'; Joelinton (yellow card) 43'; Gordon 51', (yellow card) 55'; Livramento (yellow card) 90+5'	Stadium: Emirates Stadium; Attendance: 59,125; Referee: John Brooks

5 February 2025 Semi-finals Second leg	Newcastle United	2–0 (4–0 agg.)	Arsenal	Newcastle upon Tyne
20:00 GMT	Murphy 19'; Bruno Guimarães (yellow card) 47'; Gordon 52'; Schär (yellow card) 90+3'	Report	Havertz (yellow card) 42'; Saliba (yellow card) 44'; Sterling (yellow card) 83'	Stadium: St James' Park; Attendance: 52,173; Referee: Simon Hooper

16 March 2025 Final	Liverpool	1–2	Newcastle United	Wembley
16:30 GMT	Chiesa 90+4', (yellow card) 90+8'	Report	Burn 45'; Isak 52'; Pope (yellow card) 90'; Tonali (yellow card) 90+9'	Stadium: Wembley Stadium; Attendance: 88,513; Referee: John Brooks

== Statistics ==
=== Appearances and goals ===
As of match played 25 May 2025

No.	Pos	Nat	Player	Total		Premier League		FA Cup		EFL Cup	
No.	Pos	Nat	Player	Apps	Goals	Apps	Goals	Apps	Goals	Apps	Goals
1	GK	(Slovakia) SVK	Martin Dúbravka	16	0	10	0	2	0	4	0
2	DF	(England) ENG	Kieran Trippier	30	0	14+11	0	2	0	2+1	0
4	DF	(Netherlands) NED	Sven Botman	10	0	6+2	0	0	0	2	0
5	DF	(Switzerland) SUI	Fabian Schär	42	6	33+1	4	2+1	0	5	2
7	MF	(Brazil) BRA	Joelinton	37	4	29	4	2	0	6	0
8	MF	(Italy) ITA	Sandro Tonali	45	6	28+8	4	1+2	0	6	2
9	FW	(England) ENG	Callum Wilson	22	1	2+16	0	1+1	1	0+2	0
10	MF	(England) ENG	Anthony Gordon	42	9	28+6	6	1+1	1	4+2	2
11	MF	(England) ENG	Harvey Barnes	40	9	17+16	9	2	0	3+2	0
13	DF	(England) ENG	Matt Targett	5	0	0+2	0	2+1	0	0	0
14	FW	(Sweden) SWE	Alexander Isak	42	27	34	23	1+1	1	6	3
17	DF	(Sweden) SWE	Emil Krafth	18	0	2+10	0	1	0	3+2	0
18	FW	(Denmark) DEN	William Osula	19	2	0+14	1	2	1	1+2	0
19	GK	(Greece) GRE	Odysseas Vlachodimos	1	0	0	0	0	0	0+1	0
20	DF	(England) ENG	Lewis Hall	34	0	24+3	0	0+1	0	5+1	0
21	DF	(England) ENG	Tino Livramento	45	0	32+5	0	2	0	4+2	0
22	GK	(England) ENG	Nick Pope	32	0	28	0	1	0	3	0
23	MF	(England) ENG	Jacob Murphy	42	9	31+4	8	0+2	0	5	1
28	MF	(England) ENG	Joe Willock	41	3	11+21	0	1+1	2	4+3	1
33	DF	(England) ENG	Dan Burn	46	2	37	1	2	0	5+2	1
36	MF	(England) ENG	Sean Longstaff	32	0	8+17	0	2	0	2+3	0
39	MF	(Brazil) BRA	Bruno Guimarães	47	5	38	5	1+2	0	3+3	0
67	MF	(England) ENG	Lewis Miley	19	2	1+13	1	3	1	0+2	0
75	MF	(England) ENG	Trevan Sanusi	1	0	0	0	0+1	0	0	0
Player(s) who left on loan but featured this season
25	DF	(England) ENG	Lloyd Kelly	14	0	4+6	0	1	0	2+1	0
Player(s) who left permanently but featured this season
24	MF	(Paraguay) PAR	Miguel Almirón	14	0	1+8	0	1	0	2+2	0
