= 2025 EFL Cup final =

Final of the 2024–25 EFL Cup

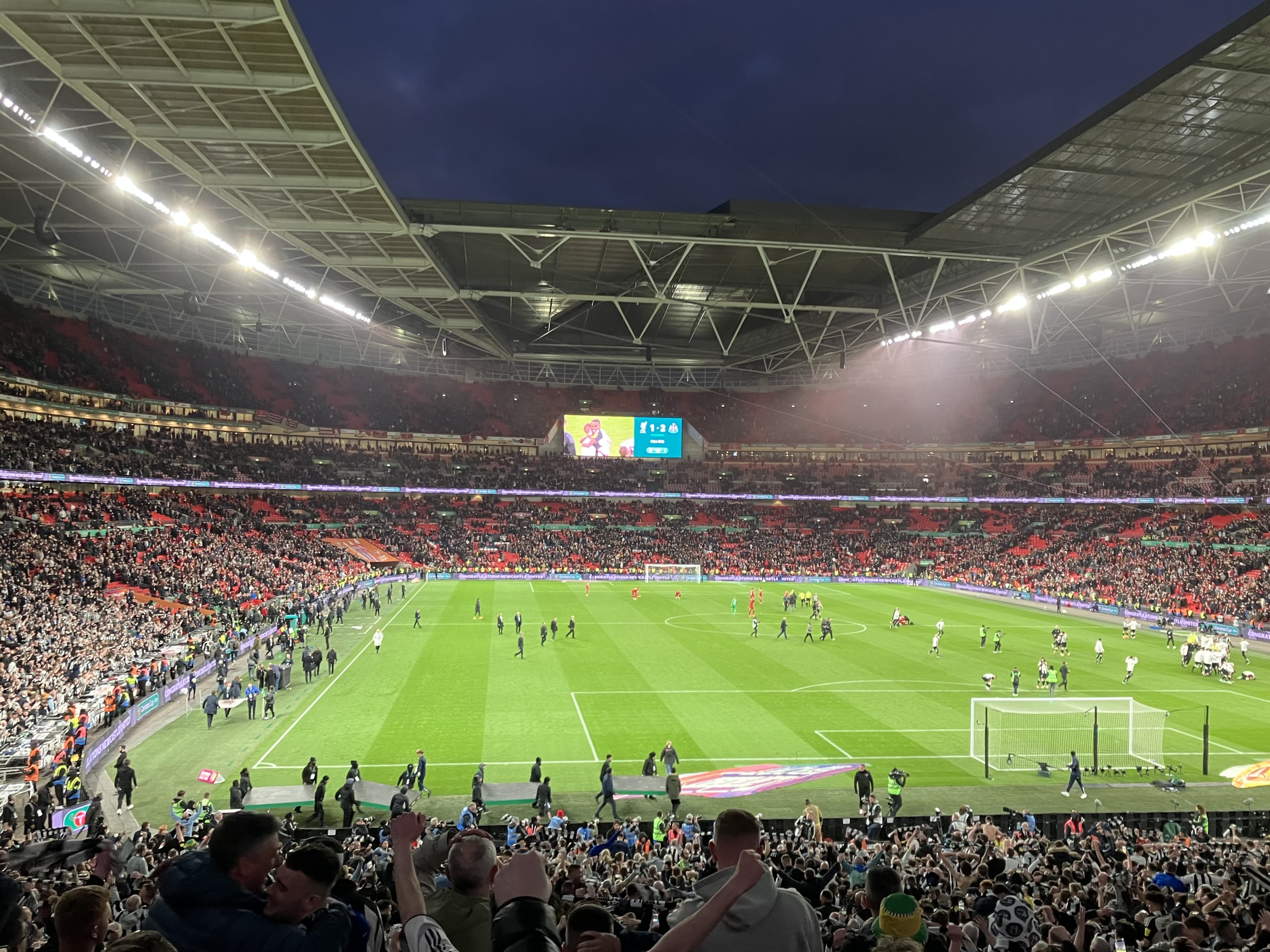
- Wembley Stadium at full time
- Event: 2024–25 EFL Cup
Liverpool	Newcastle United
1	2
- Date: 16 March 2025
- Venue: Wembley Stadium, London
- Man of the Match: Dan Burn (Newcastle United)
- Referee: John Brooks (Leicestershire)
- Attendance: 88,513

The 2025 EFL Cup final was the final match of the 2024–25 EFL Cup. It was played between Liverpool and Newcastle United at Wembley Stadium in London, England, on 16 March 2025. It was the 65th EFL Cup final and the 18th to be played at the rebuilt Wembley.

Newcastle United won the match 2–1 to secure their first EFL Cup title, their first major trophy since the 1968–69 Inter-Cities Fairs Cup and their first major domestic trophy since the 1954–55 FA Cup.

== Route to the final ==
=== Liverpool ===
Round	Opposition	Score
3	West Ham United (H)	5–1
4	Brighton & Hove Albion (A)	3–2
QF	Southampton (A)	2–1
SF	Tottenham Hotspur (A)	0–1
SF	Tottenham Hotspur (H)	4–0
Key: (H) = Home; (A) = Away

As a Premier League club involved in UEFA competitions, Liverpool entered in the third round and were drawn at home to fellow Premier League club West Ham United. The match was played at Anfield on 25 September 2024, where Liverpool won 5–1 thanks to goals from Diogo Jota, Mohamed Salah and Cody Gakpo and goal for West Ham from an own goal by Jarell Quansah. In the fourth round, they were drawn away to Premier League club Brighton & Hove Albion, played at Falmer Stadium on 30 October 2024. The match finished with a 3–2 victory for Liverpool, with Gakpo and Luis Díaz both getting on the scoresheet for Liverpool and Simon Adingra and Tariq Lamptey scoring for Brighton.

In the quarter-finals, Liverpool were drawn away to Premier League club Southampton, played at St Mary's Stadium on 18 December 2024. Liverpool recorded a 2–1 victory, with goals coming from Darwin Núñez and Harvey Elliott after a Southampton goal from Cameron Archer. In the semi-finals, played over two legs, Liverpool were drawn against Premier League club Tottenham Hotspur, with the first leg played away at the Tottenham Hotspur Stadium on 8 January 2025. Tottenham won the match 1–0 after a late goal by Lucas Bergvall, in a match fuelled with controversy after Liverpool claimed that Bergvall should have been shown a red card for a second yellow card before the goal was scored. The second leg was played at Anfield on 6 February, where Liverpool produced a dominant display to record a 4–0 victory, with goals coming from Gakpo, Salah, Dominik Szoboszlai and Virgil van Dijk. As a result, Liverpool won the tie 4–1 on aggregate to progress to their second consecutive EFL Cup final, and their third in four seasons.

=== Newcastle United ===
Round	Opposition	Score
2	Nottingham Forest (A)	1–1 (4–3 p.)
3	AFC Wimbledon (H)	1–0
4	Chelsea (H)	2–0
QF	Brentford (H)	3–1
SF	Arsenal (A)	2–0
SF	Arsenal (H)	2–0
Key: (H) = Home; (A) = Away

As a Premier League club not involved in any UEFA competitions, Newcastle United entered the cup in the second round where they were drawn away against fellow Premier League club Nottingham Forest. The match was played at the City Ground on 28 August 2024, where Newcastle won 4–3 on penalties following a 1–1 draw after a goal for Newcastle from Joe Willock and a goal for Forest from Jota Silva. Callum Hudson-Odoi, Nikola Milenković and Neco Williams all scored their spot kicks for Forest, however, Ibrahim Sangaré and Taiwo Awoniyi missed their penalties for the home side. Alexander Isak, Bruno Guimarães, Anthony Gordon and Sean Longstaff converted their penalties with Joelinton the only player to miss theirs for the visitors. In the third round, they were drawn against EFL League Two club Wimbledon, played at St James' Park on 1 October. The match finished 1–0, with Newcastle's winning goal coming from a penalty by defender Fabian Schär in the first minute of first-half injury time. The fixture was initially scheduled to be hosted by Wimbledon on 24 September, but was postponed and switched to Newcastle due to flooding at Wimbledon's stadium, Plough Lane. In the fourth round, Newcastle were drawn at home against Premier League club and 2024 finalists Chelsea, with the match played at St James' Park on 30 October. The match saw Newcastle defeat Chelsea 2–0, with goals coming from both Isak and an own goal from Chelsea defender Axel Disasi.

In the quarter-finals, Newcastle were drawn at home to Premier League club Brentford, with the match played at St James' Park on 18 December. Two goals from Sandro Tonali inspired Newcastle to a 3–1 victory, with Schär also getting on the scoresheet, as they booked a place in the semi-finals. There, they would face Premier League club Arsenal over two legs, with the first leg played away at the Emirates Stadium on 7 January 2025. Newcastle beat the Gunners 2–0, with goals from Isak and Gordon giving the Magpies a two-goal advantage in the second leg. This was played at St James' Park on 5 February, where Newcastle repeated the first leg scoreline with a 2–0 victory, courtesy of goals from Gordon and Jacob Murphy, as Newcastle won the semi-final 4–0 on aggregate to reach their second final in three seasons.

== Pre-match ==
=== Background ===
This was Newcastle's third appearance in the final, having previously lost in 1976 and 2023. Liverpool were the reigning EFL Cup holders and were appearing in a record fifteenth final, having won the cup a record 10 times.

Newcastle were aiming to end one of the longest trophy droughts in English football, with their last major honour being the 1968–69 Inter-Cities Fairs Cup. Their most recent major domestic trophy was even earlier, when they won the 1954–55 FA Cup.

=== Team news ===
Anthony Gordon missed the final for Newcastle after receiving a red card in an FA Cup defeat against Brighton and Hove Albion for a challenge on Jan Paul van Hecke on 2 March. Lewis Hall and Sven Botman would also miss the final with Hall out for the remainder of the season with a foot injury and Botman ruled out for eight weeks with another knee injury. Five of Newcastle's starting line-up had started the 2023 final, while two had appeared off the bench. Callum Wilson, who appeared off the bench, had started the 2023 final and Joe Willock played as a substitute on both occasions. For Liverpool, Trent Alexander-Arnold, Conor Bradley, Joe Gomez, and Tyler Morton all missed the final due to injury.

Newcastle were the first side to win the cup with as many as six English starters in the final since Leicester City in the 1997 Football League Cup final. Runners-up Bradford City were the last team to field that many English starters in a final, in the 2013 Football League Cup final.

== Match ==
=== Summary ===
In the final minute of the first half, Dan Burn scored with a header to the left corner of the net after a corner from the left from Kieran Trippier to give Newcastle a 1–0 lead at half-time. In the 52nd minute, Alexander Isak scored with a half-volley low to the left of the net to give Newcastle a 2–0 lead.

External videos
- Second goal of the match.

In the fourth minute of time added on Liverpool substitute Federico Chiesa scored with a low left footed finish to make it 2–1. The match eventually ended as a 2–1 victory for Newcastle.

=== Details ===
16 March 2025
16:30 GMT

Liverpool	1–2	Newcastle United
Chiesa 90+4'	Report	Burn 45'; Isak 52'

Wembley Stadium, London
Attendance: 88,513
Referee: John Brooks

Liverpool	Newcastle United

GK	62	(Republic of Ireland) Caoimhín Kelleher
RB	78	(England) Jarell Quansah
CB	5	(France) Ibrahima Konaté		(substituted off) 57'
CB	4	(Netherlands) Virgil van Dijk (c)
LB	26	(Scotland) Andy Robertson
CM	38	(Netherlands) Ryan Gravenberch		(substituted off) 74'
CM	10	(Argentina) Alexis Mac Allister		(substituted off) 67'
RW	11	(Egypt) Mohamed Salah
AM	8	(Hungary) Dominik Szoboszlai
LW	7	(Colombia) Luis Díaz		(substituted off) 74'
CF	20	(Portugal) Diogo Jota		(substituted off) 57'
Substitutes:
GK	1	(Brazil) Alisson
DF	21	(Greece) Kostas Tsimikas
MF	3	(Japan) Wataru Endō
MF	17	(England) Curtis Jones		(substituted on) 57'
MF	19	(England) Harvey Elliott		(substituted on) 74'
MF	53	(England) James McConnell
FW	9	(Uruguay) Darwin Núñez		(substituted on) 57'
FW	14	(Italy) Federico Chiesa	(yellow card) 90+8'	(substituted on) 74'
FW	18	(Netherlands) Cody Gakpo		(substituted on) 67'
Manager:
(Netherlands) Arne Slot

GK	22	(England) Nick Pope	(yellow card) 90'
RB	2	(England) Kieran Trippier
CB	5	(Switzerland) Fabian Schär
CB	33	(England) Dan Burn
LB	21	(England) Tino Livramento
CM	39	(Brazil) Bruno Guimarães (c)
CM	8	(Italy) Sandro Tonali	(yellow card) 90+9'
CM	7	(Brazil) Joelinton
RF	23	(England) Jacob Murphy		(substituted off) 90'
CF	14	(Sweden) Alexander Isak		(substituted off) 81'
LF	11	(England) Harvey Barnes		(substituted off) 81'
Substitutes:
GK	1	(Slovakia) Martin Dúbravka
DF	13	(England) Matt Targett
DF	17	(Sweden) Emil Krafth		(substituted on) 90'
MF	28	(England) Joe Willock		(substituted on) 81'
MF	36	(England) Sean Longstaff
MF	67	(England) Lewis Miley
FW	9	(England) Callum Wilson		(substituted on) 81'
FW	18	(Denmark) William Osula
FW	78	(England) Sean Neave
Manager:
(England) Eddie Howe

Man of the Match:
Dan Burn (Newcastle United)

Assistant referees:
Eddie Smart
Nick Greenhalgh
Fourth official:
Darren England
Reserve assistant referee:
Steve Meredith
Video assistant referee:
Stuart Attwell
Assistant video assistant referee:
Sian Massey-Ellis

Match rules

- 90 minutes
- 30 minutes of extra time if necessary
- Penalty shoot-out if scores still level
- Nine named substitutes
- Maximum of five substitutions, with a sixth allowed in extra time (Note: Each team was given only three opportunities to make substitutions, with a fourth opportunity in extra time, excluding substitutions made at half-time, before the start of extra time and at half-time in extra time.)

=== Statistics ===
Overall
Statistic	Liverpool	Newcastle United
Total shots	7	17
Shots on target	2	6
Ball possession	66%	34%
Corner kicks	4	9
Offside	2	2
Fouls committed	14	10
Yellow cards	1	2
Red cards	0	0

== Broadcasting ==
The cup final resulted in record viewing figures with over half the viewing public in the United Kingdom, alongside 193 countries, tuning in. The match was televised live in the United Kingdom via pay-TV broadcaster Sky, who showed the game on their Sky Showcase, Sky Sports Main Event and Sky Sports Football channels. During the game, the Sky Sports Football channel was simulcast on free-to-air channel ITV1 (STV in Scotland). The final was available for streaming on Sky Go and Now, with Sky's coverage also streamed live on ITVX and STV Player. Radio commentary was provided by BBC Radio 5 Live and Talksport.
