= Jacob Murphy =

English footballer (born 1995)

- Murphy with Newcastle United in 2026

Personal information
- Full name: Jacob Kai Murphy
- Date of birth: 24 February 1995 (age 31)
- Place of birth: Wembley, England
- Height: 5 ft 10 in (1.79 m)
- Position: Winger

Team information
- Current team: Newcastle United
- Number: 23

Youth career
- 2006–2013: Norwich City

Senior career*
| Years | Team | Apps | (Gls) |
| 2013–2017 | Norwich City | 37 | (9) |
| 2014 | → Swindon Town (loan) | 6 | (0) |
| 2014 | → Southend United (loan) | 7 | (1) |
| 2014 | → Blackpool (loan) | 9 | (2) |
| 2015 | → Scunthorpe United (loan) | 3 | (0) |
| 2015 | → Colchester United (loan) | 11 | (4) |
| 2015–2016 | → Coventry City (loan) | 40 | (9) |
| 2017– | Newcastle United | 227 | (23) |
| 2019 | → West Bromwich Albion (loan) | 13 | (2) |
| 2019–2020 | → Sheffield Wednesday (loan) | 39 | (9) |

International career
| 2012 | England U18 | 1 | (0) |
| 2012–2013 | England U19 | 4 | (0) |
| 2014 | England U20 | 1 | (0) |
| 2017 | England U21 | 6 | (3) |
- * Club domestic league appearances and goals as of 23:25, 7 November 2026 (UTC)

Jacob Kai Murphy (born 24 February 1995) is an English professional footballer who plays as a right winger for Premier League club Newcastle United.

Murphy made his first-team debut for Norwich City in an FA Cup match against Fulham in January 2014. He has also played on loan for Swindon Town, Southend United and Sheffield Wednesday. He is the twin brother of professional footballer Josh Murphy. The brothers are nephews of former Ipswich Town utility player Tommy Parkin.

== Club career ==
=== Norwich City ===
Along with his twin brother, Josh, he first played football from the age of seven, and eventually they both joined Norwich City as under-12s in 2006. It was announced on 31 March 2011 that the duo were to join the club's academy ahead of a new season.

Murphy was a part of the Norwich City youth team which won the 2012–13 FA Youth Cup. He signed his first professional contract for Norwich City on 4 January 2013. In December 2013, he signed a three-year contract with the club.

Murphy made his professional debut in a FA Cup match against Fulham on 4 January 2014. Murphy made his first Norwich City appearance in the 2014–15 season, where he provided an assist for his twin brother, Josh, to score in a 3–1 win over Crawley Town in the second round of the League Cup.

==== Loan spells ====
On 7 February 2014, he joined Swindon Town on loan which began on 8 February, and lasted until 8 March 2014. Murphy made his debut for the club on 8 February 2014, when he came on as a second-half substitute for Dany N'Guessan in a 3–2 win over Port Vale. After making six appearances, Murphy returned to Norwich City after Swindon Town delayed their decision to extend his loan.

On 27 March 2014, Murphy joined League Two club Southend United on loan for the remainder of the 2013–14 season. He made his Southend debut days later, when he came on as a substitute and provided the winning goal in a 1–0 win over Torquay United. He scored his first goal for the club and provided an assist in a 3–1 win over Rochdale on 18 April 2014. He went on to make eight appearances for the club, including in the play-offs, but was unable to help the club get promoted to League One.

On 3 November 2014, he joined Blackpool on loan until 2 February 2015. He scored on his debut two days later in a 2–2 draw with Fulham. He scored again on 22 November 2014, in a 1–1 draw with Bolton Wanderers. His performances at Blackpool earned him the club's Player of the Month award for November. The following month, Murphy caused controversy when he posted an image on social media application Snapchat with the caption "We are going to lose... Again", which mocked the club's recent league form. Murphy issued an apology via the club's official website, admitting it was an unprofessional and foolish thing to do; however, Lee Clark vowed to investigate this matter before taking action. Blackpool cut short his loan deal on 31 December.

After his loan spell at Blackpool came to an end, Murphy joined League One club Scunthorpe United on a month-long loan. Two days later on 10 January 2015, he made his Scunthorpe United debut, making his first start, where he provided an assist for Tom Hopper, who was also making his debut, in a 4–1 win over Walsall. After making three appearances for the club, Murphy's loan spell with Scunthorpe United came to an end.

Murphy next joined League One club Colchester United on loan until the end of the season. He made his Colchester United debut on 14 March 2015 on the right wing, in a 3–2 loss to Crawley Town. He then scored in the next game against Yeovil Town on 17 March 2015, which Colchester won 2–0. He scored two goals in two games in three days against Port Vale and Barnsley. The last two games of the season saw Murphy score in a 1–1 draw against Swindon Town and he then helped the club survive relegation when they beat Preston North End.

On 14 August 2015, Murphy signed for Coventry City on a season-long loan deal. He had a successful full season there, scoring 10 times in 42 games, with nine of the goals coming in the league.

==== Return to Norwich City ====
Murphy scored his first goal for Norwich in a 4–1 win over Blackburn Rovers on 6 August 2016. His first full season at Norwich yielded 10 goals in 40 games, including nine in the league.

=== Newcastle United ===
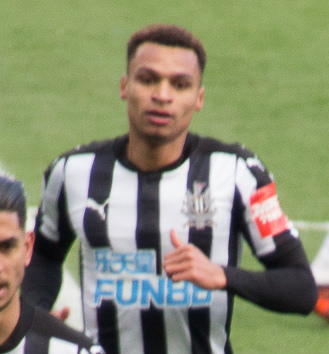
Murphy playing for Newcastle United in his first season at the club.

Murphy signed for Newcastle United for an undisclosed fee on 19 July 2017. He cited Newcastle United as his boyhood team and stated that it was his dream to represent the club. Murphy's parents were born in the local area and he has family members from Newcastle's neighbouring town Gateshead. Murphy scored his first goal for United in a 3–1 loss to Manchester City on 20 January 2018.

==== Loan to West Bromwich Albion ====
On 31 January 2019, Murphy joined West Bromwich Albion on loan until August.

==== Loan to Sheffield Wednesday ====
On 8 August 2019, Murphy joined Sheffield Wednesday on loan until the end of the season. Murphy ended his loan spell with nine goals from 39 league appearances for the Owls, ending the season as the club's second top scorer behind Steven Fletcher.

==== Return to Newcastle United ====
Murphy playing for Newcastle United in 2021.

On 7 July 2021, Murphy signed a contract extension with Newcastle United. On 23 April 2023, he scored a brace within the first ten minutes in a 6–1 win over Tottenham Hotspur.

In the 2024–25 Premier League season, Murphy cemented his spot in the Newcastle United starting eleven after a run of good of form, scoring three goals and providing four assists in December, leading him to be nominated for Premier League Player of the Month; he then became the only right winger at the club after the sale of Miguel Almirón. On 16 March 2025 Murphy started in the 2025 EFL Cup final and assisted the second goal in a 2–1 victory, becoming part of the first Newcastle United team to win a major domestic trophy in 70 years. Murphy had also scored in the semi-final against Arsenal to help the club to success. On 9 May 2025, Jacob Murphy won the PFA's Premier League Fans' Player of the Month award for April.

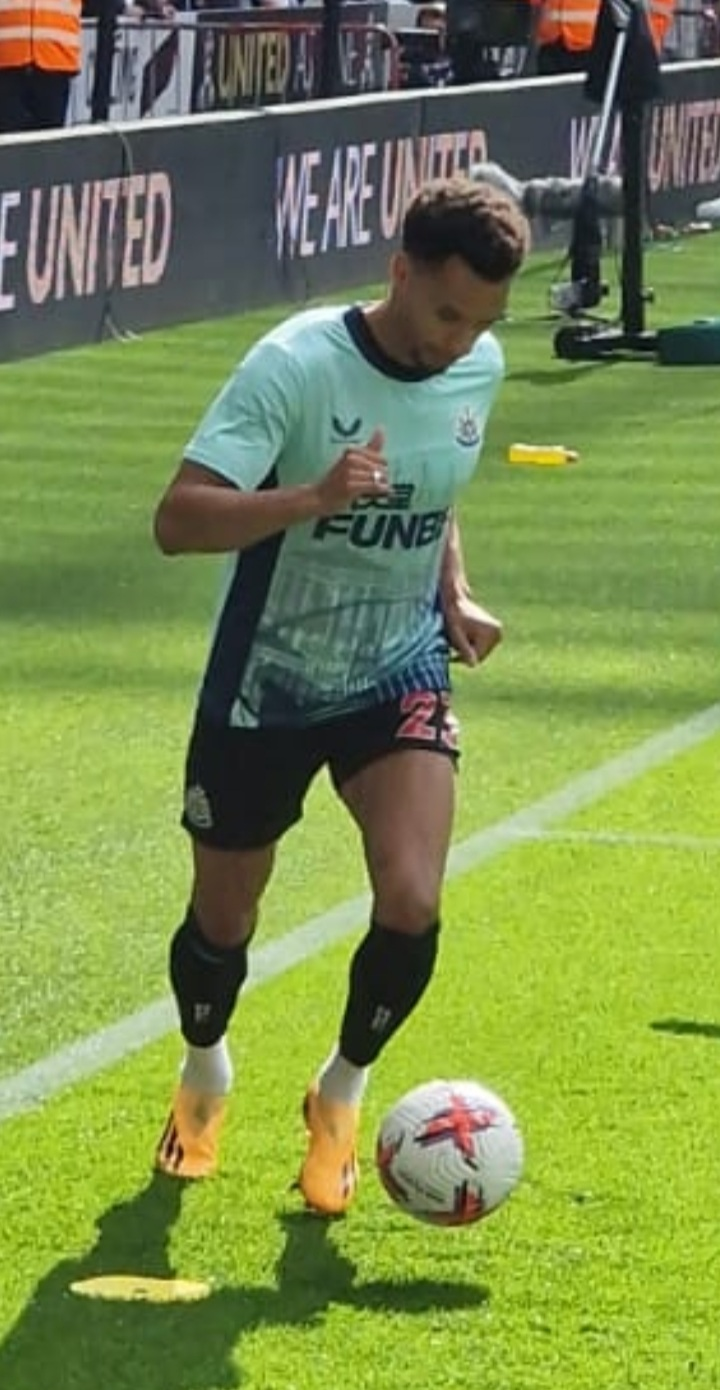
Murphy playing for Newcastle United in 2023.

On 11 May 2025, in a home game against Chelsea, with a second minute assist for Sandro Tonali; Jacob Murphy reached 20 Premier League goal involvements (12 assists, 8 goals) in a season for the first time in his career.

== International career ==
Murphy playing for England U21 in 2017.

Murphy was called up to the England U18s in October 2012 and made his debut in a 2–0 win over Italy U18s on 24 October 2012.

In November 2012, Murphy was called up by England U19s. His debut came in a 1–0 win over Finland U19s on 13 November 2012.

In late 2014, Murphy was called up by England U20s after his brother Josh withdrew from the squad and made his debut in a 3–2 win over Netherlands U20s on 14 October 2014.

In 2017 Murphy was called up to the England U21s squad. In his first game he scored twice in a 3–0 win over Iceland U21s. Jacob Murphy scored his third goal for Englands U21s on 22 June 2017, when he came on as a substitute to score an overhead bicycle kick and put the U21s through to the semi-finals of the 2017 UEFA European Under-21 Championship.

== Personal life ==
The twins talked about their close bonds and being there for each other. Their parents and his younger brother live in Downham Market and run the nearby Arbuckles restaurant. Their father, John, works as an assistant principal at Downham Market Academy. While on the pitch, Chris Hughton, manager at the time, told the twins to wear different coloured boots so that he could tell them apart. Murphy is of Irish descent through his mother and he is of Nigerian origin through his father.

== Career statistics ==
As of match played 7 November 2026

Appearances and goals by club, season and competition
| Club | Season | League | | | FA Cup | | League Cup | | Europe | | Other | | Total | |
| Club | Season | Division | Apps | Goals | Apps | Goals | Apps | Goals | Apps | Goals | Apps | Goals | Apps | Goals |
|---|---|---|---|---|---|---|---|---|---|---|---|---|---|---|
| Norwich City | 2013–14 | Premier League | 0 | 0 | 1 | 0 | 0 | 0 | — | | — | | 1 | 0 |
| Norwich City | 2014–15 | Championship | 0 | 0 | 0 | 0 | 1 | 0 | — | | — | | 1 | 0 |
| Norwich City | 2015–16 | Premier League | 0 | 0 | — | | — | | — | | — | | 0 | 0 |
| Norwich City | 2016–17 | Championship | 37 | 9 | 2 | 0 | 1 | 1 | — | | — | | 40 | 10 |
| Norwich City | Total | | 37 | 9 | 3 | 0 | 2 | 1 | — | | — | | 42 | 10 |
| Swindon Town (loan) | 2013–14 | League One | 6 | 0 | — | | — | | — | | 1 (Note: Appearance in Football League Trophy) | 0 | 7 | 0 |
| Southend United (loan) | 2013–14 | League Two | 7 | 1 | — | | — | | — | | 1 (Note: Appearance in League Two play-offs) | 0 | 8 | 1 |
| Blackpool (loan) | 2014–15 | Championship | 9 | 2 | 0 | 0 | — | | — | | — | | 9 | 2 |
| Scunthorpe United (loan) | 2014–15 | League One | 3 | 0 | — | | — | | — | | — | | 3 | 0 |
| Colchester United (loan) | 2014–15 | League One | 11 | 4 | — | | — | | — | | — | | 11 | 4 |
| Coventry City (loan) | 2015–16 | League One | 40 | 9 | 1 | 1 | — | | — | | 1 | 0 | 42 | 10 |
| Newcastle United | 2017–18 | Premier League | 25 | 1 | 2 | 0 | 1 | 0 | — | | — | | 28 | 1 |
| Newcastle United | 2018–19 | Premier League | 9 | 0 | 3 | 0 | 1 | 0 | — | | — | | 13 | 0 |
| Newcastle United | 2020–21 | Premier League | 26 | 2 | 1 | 0 | 4 | 1 | — | | — | | 31 | 3 |
| Newcastle United | 2021–22 | Premier League | 33 | 1 | 1 | 0 | 0 | 0 | — | | — | | 34 | 1 |
| Newcastle United | 2022–23 | Premier League | 36 | 4 | 1 | 0 | 6 | 0 | — | | — | | 43 | 4 |
| Newcastle United | 2023–24 | Premier League | 21 | 3 | 3 | 0 | 1 | 0 | 3 (Note: Appearances in UEFA Champions League) | 0 | — | | 28 | 3 |
| Newcastle United | 2024–25 | Premier League | 35 | 8 | 2 | 0 | 4 | 1 | — | | — | | 41 | 9 |
| Newcastle United | 2025–26 | Premier League | 33 | 3 | 1 | 0 | 3 | 0 | 9 | 1 | — | | 46 | 4 |
| Newcastle United | 2026–27 | Premier League | 9 | 1 | 0 | 0 | 3 | 0 | — | | — | | 12 | 1 |
| Newcastle United | Total | | 227 | 23 | 14 | 0 | 24 | 2 | 12 | 1 | — | | 277 | 26 |
| West Bromwich Albion (loan) | 2018–19 | Championship | 13 | 2 | — | | — | | — | | 2 (Note: Appearances in Championship play-offs) | 0 | 15 | 2 |
| Sheffield Wednesday (loan) | 2019–20 | Championship | 39 | 9 | 3 | 0 | 2 | 0 | — | | — | | 44 | 9 |
| Career total | | | 392 | 59 | 21 | 1 | 28 | 3 | 12 | 1 | 4 | 0 | 457 | 64 |

== Honours ==
Newcastle United

- EFL Cup: 2024–25; runner-up: 2022–23
