= Tino Livramento =

English footballer (born 2002)

- Livramento with Southampton in 2022

Personal information
- Full name: Valentino Francisco Livramento
- Date of birth: 12 November 2002 (age 24)
- Place of birth: Croydon, England
- Height: 6 ft 0 in (1.82 m)
- Position: Full-back

Team information
- Current team: Newcastle United
- Number: 2

Youth career
- Roundshaw
- 2009–2021: Chelsea

Senior career*
Years	Team	Apps	(Gls)
2021–2023	Southampton	30	(1)
2023–	Newcastle United	80	(1)

International career^{‡}
2016–2017	England U15	5	(0)
2017–2018	England U16	5	(0)
2018–2019	England U17	10	(0)
2019	England U18	3	(0)
2019	England U19	2	(0)
2021–2025	England U21	14	(0)
2024–	England	6	(0)
Medal record
Men's football
Representing England
UEFA European Under-21 Championship
Winner	2025 Slovakia
- * Club domestic league appearances and goals as of 23:46, 18 April 2026 (UTC) ‡ National team caps and goals as of 17:10, 1 April 2026 (UTC)

Valentino Francisco Livramento (born 12 November 2002) is an English professional footballer who plays as a full-back for Premier League club Newcastle United and the England national team.

A product of the Chelsea academy, Livramento joined Premier League side Southampton in August 2021. After Southampton's relegation in 2023, he was signed by Newcastle United. Livramento made his senior international debut for England in November 2024.

== Early life ==
Born in Croydon, Greater London, Livramento joined Chelsea at under-9 level from local club Roundshaw. At Roundshaw he played as a striker. Growing up, he supported Chelsea. His father's side of the family comes from Portugal and his mother is Scottish.

== Club career ==
=== Chelsea ===
Livramento was named Chelsea academy player of the year for the 2020–21 season. Towards the end of the season, he featured on the bench in Premier League fixtures against Manchester City and Arsenal.

In July 2021, contract talks between Chelsea and Livramento stalled, with rumours that the wing-back was set to leave the club. He was reportedly subject to interest from a host of English clubs, including South Coast rivals Southampton and Brighton & Hove Albion, as well as AC Milan and RB Leipzig.

=== Southampton ===
Having failed to reach an agreement with Chelsea, Livramento signed for fellow Premier League side Southampton in August 2021, with a reported buy-back and sell-on clauses included. On 14 August 2021, Livramento made his first Premier League appearance for Southampton in a 3–1 defeat to Everton. On 23 October 2021, Livramento scored his first professional goal in Southampton's 2–2 draw with Burnley. On 24 April 2022, Livramento was ruled out for the remainder of 2022 following an ACL injury during Southampton's 2–2 draw with Brighton.

On 21 May 2023, Livramento made his first appearance for Southampton in 392 days during a 3–1 defeat to Brighton, replacing James Bree in the 77th minute. Southampton finished the season at the bottom of the Premier League table, resulting in relegation to the EFL Championship for the 2023–24 season.

=== Newcastle United ===
On 8 August 2023, Livramento joined Newcastle United, signing a five-year contract. Although the fee was officially undisclosed, it was reported to be worth an initial £32 million, plus £8 million in add-ons. Livramento made his debut for Newcastle in a 1–0 defeat against Manchester City in the Premier League. He made his UEFA Champions League debut against Borussia Dortmund, starting Newcastle's final three group stage matches, however they were unable to progress from their group.

In March 2024 Livramento scored his first goal for the club in a 3–0 victory against Wolverhampton Wanderers, running the length of the pitch before poking it under the goalkeeper. He started in the 2025 EFL Cup final as Newcastle defeated Liverpool to win their first domestic trophy for seventy years.

== International career ==
Despite Livramento representing England through the youth ranks up to Under-21 level, he was also eligible to play for the Scotland and Portugal national teams through his mother being Scottish and his father being Portuguese.

On 27 August 2021, Livramento received his first call up for the England U21s. On 7 September 2021, he made his England U21 debut during the 2–0 2023 UEFA European Under-21 Championship qualification win over Kosovo U21s at Stadium MK.

On 29 August 2024, Livramento was called up to the England senior squad for the first time for UEFA Nations League matches against Republic of Ireland and Finland. He made his senior debut on 17 November 2024 in a 5–0 victory against the Republic of Ireland.

Livramento was included in the England squad for the 2025 UEFA European Under-21 Championship which was the only international youth tournament he ever attended. He started in the quarter-final victory over Spain and semi-final win against Netherlands. Livramento then played every minute of the final as England defeated Germany after extra time to lift the trophy. His performances during the competition resulted in him being chosen by the UEFA Technical Observer panel for their team of the tournament.

On 22 May 2026, Livramento was selected in the 26-man squad for the 2026 FIFA World Cup. He was later forced to withdraw from the squad ahead of England's opening match due to sustaining a calf injury during training.

== Career statistics ==
=== Club ===
As of match played 18 April 2026

Appearances and goals by club, season and competition
Club	Season	League			FA Cup		EFL Cup		Europe		Other		Total	
Club	Season	Division	Apps	Goals	Apps	Goals	Apps	Goals	Apps	Goals	Apps	Goals	Apps	Goals
Chelsea U21	2019–20	—			—		—		—		1 (Note: Appearance(s) in EFL Trophy)	0	1	0
Chelsea U21	2020–21	—			—		—		—		3	0	3	0
Chelsea U21	Total		—		—		—		—		4	0	4	0
Southampton	2021–22	Premier League	28	1	3	0	1	0	—		—		32	1
Southampton	2022–23	Premier League	2	0	0	0	0	0	—		—		2	0
Southampton	Total		30	1	3	0	1	0	—		—		34	1
Newcastle United	2023–24	Premier League	26	1	3	0	3	0	3 (Note: Appearances in UEFA Champions League)	0	—		35	1
Newcastle United	2024–25	Premier League	37	0	2	0	6	0	—		—		45	0
Newcastle United	2025–26	Premier League	17	0	2	0	2	0	5	0	—		26	0
Newcastle United	Total		80	1	7	0	11	0	8	0	—		106	1
Career total			110	2	10	0	12	0	8	0	4	0	144	2

=== International ===
As of match played 31 March 2026

Appearances and goals by national team and year
National team	Year	Apps	Goals
England	2024	1	0
England	2025	2	0
England	2026	2	0
Total		5	0

== Honours ==
Newcastle United

- EFL Cup: 2024–25

England U21

- UEFA European Under-21 Championship: 2025

Individual

- Chelsea Academy Player of the Season: 2020–21
- UEFA European Under-21 Championship Team of the Tournament: 2025
