= Trevan Sanusi =

English association football player (born 2007)

Personal information
- Full name: Trevan Farooq Sanusi
- Date of birth: 25 April 2007 (age 19)
- Place of birth: England
- Height: 1.78 m (5 ft 10 in)
- Position: Winger

Team information
- Current team: Newcastle United
- Number: 50

Youth career
- 2021–2023: Birmingham City
- 2023–2025: Newcastle United

Senior career*
Years	Team	Apps	(Gls)
2025–	Newcastle United	0	(0)
2025–2026	→ Lorient (loan)	0	(0)
2025–2026	→ Lorient II (loan)	3	(0)

International career^{‡}
2021–2022	England U15	4	(0)
2022–2023	England U16	8	(1)
2023–2024	England U17	3	(0)
2024–2025	England U18	7	(1)
- * Club domestic league appearances and goals as of 19 May 2026 ‡ National team caps and goals as of 00:15, 1 September 2025 (UTC)

Trevan Farooq Sanusi (born 25 April 2007) is an English professional footballer who plays as a winger for Premier League club Newcastle United. He is an England youth international.

== Club career ==
Sanusi has been described as a left-winger, and was in the academy at Birmingham City prior to joining Newcastle United in September 2023, amid reported interest from other Premier League clubs.

Sanusi trained with the Newcastle first-team in the summer of 2024 and was the only player to feature in all six of Newcastle’s official pre-season friendly matches in July 2024. The club reportedly turned down loan opportunities in order to keep him training at Newcastle with the first team squad at the start of the 2024–25 season. Sanusi was included in the Newcastle match day squad for the FA Cup third round match against Bromley on 12 January 2025, and made his debut as a second-half substitute in a 3–1 win.

On 1 September 2025, Sanusi was loaned by Lorient in French Ligue 1. He scored his first senior professional goal on 20 September in the Coupe de France against Gosier.

== International career ==
Sanusi is an England youth international, and scored for England U18 against Switzerland U18 in September 2024.

== Personal life ==
Born in England, Sanusi has Nigerian heritage.

== Career statistics ==
=== Club ===
As of match played 12 January 2025

Appearances and goals by club, season and competition
Club	Season	League			FA Cup		EFL Cup		Europe		Other		Total	
Club	Season	Division	Apps	Goals	Apps	Goals	Apps	Goals	Apps	Goals	Apps	Goals	Apps	Goals
Newcastle United	2024–25	Premier League	0	0	1	0	0	0	—		—		1	0
Career total			0	0	1	0	0	0	0	0	0	0	1	0
