= Joe Willock =

English footballer (born 1999)

- Willock playing for Newcastle United in 2026

Personal information
- Full name: Joseph George Willock
- Date of birth: 20 August 1999 (age 27)
- Place of birth: Waltham Forest, England
- Height: 5 ft 10 in (1.79 m)
- Position: Midfielder

Team information
- Current team: Newcastle United
- Number: 28

Youth career
- 2014–2017: Arsenal

Senior career*
Years	Team	Apps	(Gls)
2017–2021	Arsenal	40	(1)
2021	→ Newcastle United (loan)	14	(8)
2021–	Newcastle United	134	(8)

International career
2014	England U16	2	(1)
2017–2018	England U19	6	(0)
2018–2019	England U20	7	(4)
2019–2020	England U21	4	(0)
- * Club domestic league appearances and goals as of 22:56, 19 September 2026 (UTC)

Joseph George Willock (born 20 August 1999) is an English professional footballer who plays as a midfielder for Premier League club Newcastle United.

== Club career ==
=== Arsenal ===
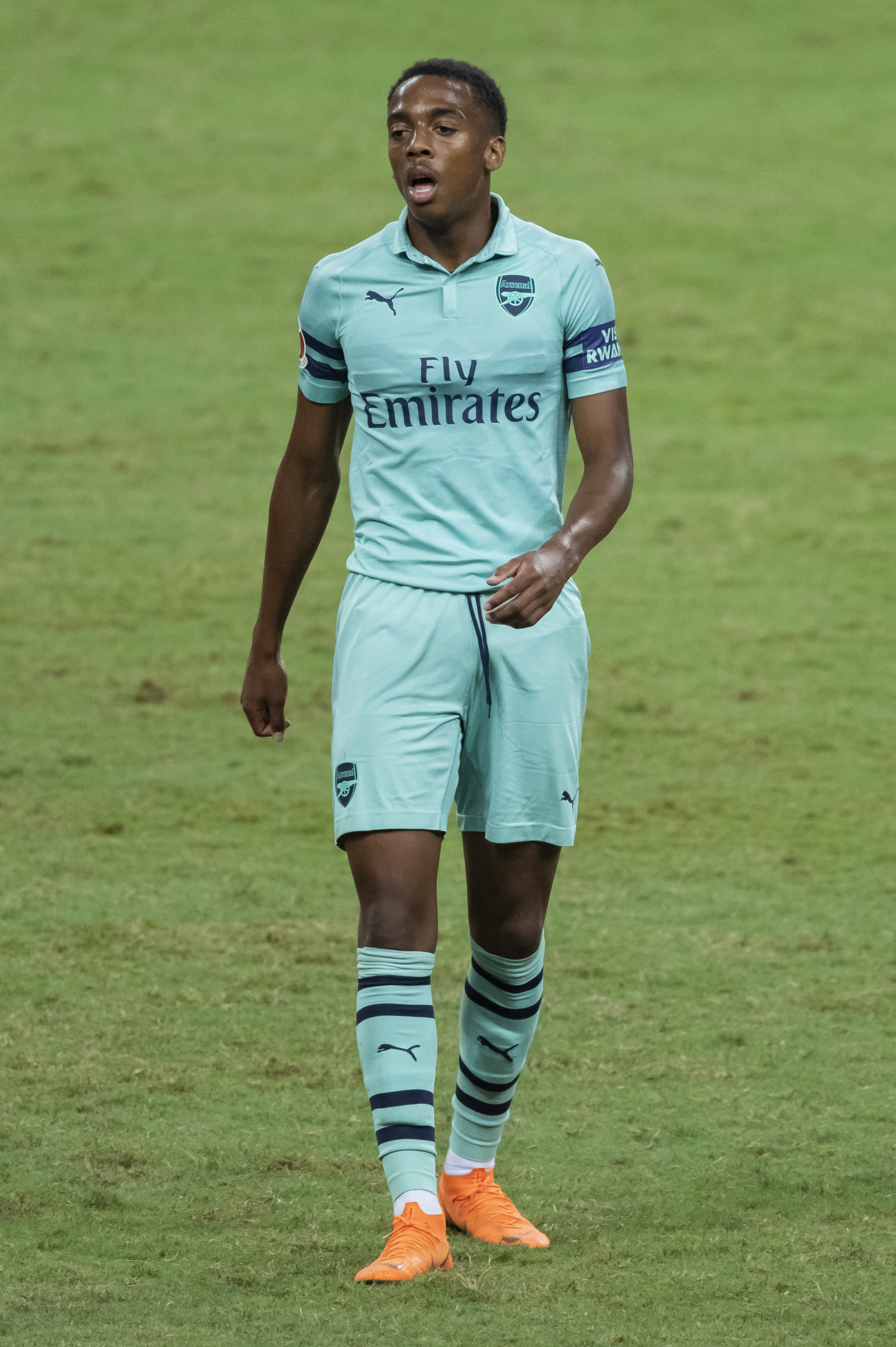
Willock playing for Arsenal in 2018

A youth product of Arsenal, Willock joined Arsenal at age four-and-a-half, having been allowed to play alongside his older brothers. He made his first-team debut for the club on 20 September 2017 in the EFL Cup against Doncaster Rovers.

Willock made his Premier League debut against Newcastle United on 15 April 2018. He scored his first senior goal on 29 November 2018 in a 3–0 UEFA Europa League victory away at Vorskla Poltava. He then scored his first brace in a 3–0 FA Cup victory away at Blackpool on 5 January 2019.

On 12 September 2019, it was announced that Willock had signed a new long-term contract with Arsenal. On 19 September 2019, he played as Arsenal won 3–0 against Eintracht Frankfurt by scoring a deflected effort to open the scoring in the opening matchday of the 2019–20 UEFA Europa League. Willock scored his first goal at the Emirates Stadium on 24 September 2019 after tapping-in Arsenal's third goal in a 5–0 EFL Cup win over Nottingham Forest, set-up by Héctor Bellerín. On 25 June 2020, he scored his first Premier League goal in a 2–0 win over Southampton.

=== Newcastle United ===
Willock in 2026

On 1 February 2021, Willock joined Newcastle United on loan for the remainder of the 2020–21 season. On 6 February, Willock scored in the 16th minute on his debut in a 3–2 win over Southampton. After scoring in three consecutive substitute appearances against Tottenham Hotspur, West Ham United and Liverpool, Willock was rewarded with a start against Leicester City, where he was once again on target, scoring the opening goal in a 4–2 win. On 14 May, Willock scored in a 4–3 defeat against Manchester City. On 19 May, he scored in his sixth consecutive league game, becoming the youngest player in Premier League history to do so at the age of 21 years and 272 days, a record previously held by Romelu Lukaku. This was surpassed by Rasmus Højlund on 18 February 2024. Four days later, on the final day of the Premier League season, he scored again to equal the club record of consecutive games scored in, set by Alan Shearer.

On 13 August 2021, Newcastle confirmed the signing of Willock on a six-year contract. The fee was reported to be £25 million. On 19 February 2022, Willock scored his first goal since signing permanently for the club, in a 1–1 draw against West Ham United. The following week, he scored Newcastle's second goal in a 2–0 win over Brentford.

On 16 March 2025, Willock came off the bench to appear in the 2025 EFL Cup final and become part of the first Newcastle United team to win a major domestic honour in 70 years. Willock had scored the team's only goal against Nottingham Forest in the second round of the tournament to help the club to the final. On 28 January 2026, he scored his first UEFA Champions League goal in a 1–1 away draw with Paris Saint-Germain.

== International career ==
Willock scored for the England under-16 team against Scotland in the 2014 Victory Shield. He also represented the England under-19 team but was one of a number of players withdrawn from selection for the 2018 UEFA European Under-19 Championship by their club.

Willock represented the England under-20 team in the 2018–19 Under 20 Elite League and scored the winning goals in games against Italy and Germany. Willock was a member of an England Under-20 side at the 2019 Toulon Tournament and scored in group stage defeats against Portugal and Chile.

On 30 August 2019, Willock was included in the England under-21 squad for the first time but had to withdraw due to injury. He eventually made his U21 debut on 11 October 2019 during a 2–2 draw with Slovenia in Maribor.

== Personal life ==
Willock was born in Walthamstow which is located in Waltham Forest, Greater London. His brothers, Chris and Matty, are also footballers. All three brothers shared a pitch when Manchester United played a reserve game against Arsenal in May 2017. He is of Montserratian descent.

== Career statistics ==
As of match played 19 September 2026

Appearances and goals by club, season and competition
Club	Season	League			FA Cup		EFL Cup		Europe		Other		Total	
Club	Season	Division	Apps	Goals	Apps	Goals	Apps	Goals	Apps	Goals	Apps	Goals	Apps	Goals
Arsenal	2017–18	Premier League	2	0	1	0	3	0	5 (Note: Appearances in UEFA Europa League)	0	0	0	11	0
Arsenal	2018–19	Premier League	2	0	1	2	0	0	3	1	—		6	3
Arsenal	2019–20	Premier League	29	1	5	0	2	2	8	2	—		44	5
Arsenal	2020–21	Premier League	7	0	1	0	3	0	5	3	1 (Note: Appearance in FA Community Shield)	0	17	3
Arsenal	Total		40	1	8	2	8	2	21	6	1	0	78	11
Arsenal U21	2018–19	—			—		—		—		2 (Note: Appearances in EFL Trophy)	3	2	3
Newcastle United (loan)	2020–21	Premier League	14	8	—		—		—		—		14	8
Newcastle United	2021–22	Premier League	29	2	1	0	1	0	—		—		31	2
Newcastle United	2022–23	Premier League	35	3	1	0	7	0	—		—		43	3
Newcastle United	2023–24	Premier League	9	1	2	0	1	1	2 (Note: Appearances in UEFA Champions League)	0	—		14	2
Newcastle United	2024–25	Premier League	32	0	2	2	7	1	—		—		41	3
Newcastle United	2025–26	Premier League	24	0	3	0	3	0	9	1	—		39	1
Newcastle United	2026–27	Premier League	5	2	0	0	2	1	—		—		7	3
Newcastle United	Total		134	8	9	2	20	3	11	1	—		174	14
Career total			188	17	17	4	28	5	32	7	3	3	268	36

== Honours ==
Arsenal

- FA Cup: 2019–20
- FA Community Shield: 2017, 2020
- UEFA Europa League runner-up: 2018–19

Newcastle United

- EFL Cup: 2024–25; runner-up: 2022–23

Individual

- Premier League Player of the Month: May 2021

== See also ==
- List of Arsenal F.C. players
- List of Newcastle United F.C. players
