= Anthony Gordon (footballer) =

English footballer (born 2001)

- Gordon with England in 2026

Personal information
- Full name: Anthony Michael Gordon
- Date of birth: 24 February 2001 (age 25)
- Place of birth: Liverpool, England
- Height: 6 ft 0 in (1.83 m)
- Position: Winger

Team information
- Current team: Barcelona
- Number: 17

Youth career
- 2007–2012: Liverpool
- 2012–2017: Everton

Senior career*
Years	Team	Apps	(Gls)
2017–2023	Everton	65	(7)
2021	→ Preston North End (loan)	11	(0)
2023–2026	Newcastle United	111	(24)
2026–	Barcelona	12	(2)

International career^{‡}
2018–2019	England U18	10	(0)
2019	England U19	7	(2)
2020	England U20	1	(0)
2021–2023	England U21	16	(6)
2024–	England	30	(7)
Medal record
Men's football
Representing England
FIFA World Cup
Third place	2026 Canada–Mexico–US
UEFA European Championship
Runner-up	2024 Germany
UEFA European Under-21 Championship
Winner	2023 Georgia–Romania
- * Club domestic league appearances and goals as of 21:36, 22 November 2026 (UTC) ‡ National team caps and goals as of 21:55, 15 November 2026 (UTC)

Anthony Michael Gordon (born 24 February 2001) is an English professional footballer who plays as a left winger for La Liga club Barcelona and the England national team.

Gordon began his professional career with Everton, making his senior debut in December 2017 in a Europa League match, before joining Newcastle United in 2023. In 2026, he joined Spanish club Barcelona.

== Early life ==
Anthony Michael Gordon was born on 24 February 2001 in Liverpool, Merseyside. He is of Irish and Scottish descent.

== Club career ==
=== Everton ===
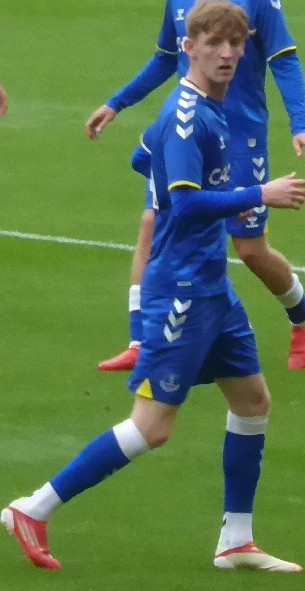
Gordon playing for Everton in 2021

Gordon joined Everton as an 11-year-old following his release from Liverpool's Academy. On 6 December 2017, Gordon was named in Everton's first-team squad for the Europa League match away to Apollon Limassol. A day later, he made his first-team debut in the fixture, coming on as an 88th-minute substitute in a 3–0 win.

On 18 January 2020, Gordon made his Premier League debut coming on as a substitute for Bernard in a 1–1 draw with West Ham United. On 26 June, he received his first Premier League start in a 0–0 draw with Liverpool. On 1 September, Gordon signed a new five-year contract with Everton.

On 1 February 2021, Gordon joined Championship club Preston North End on loan for the remainder of the 2020–21 season. Five days later, he made his debut for Preston, being included in the starting line-up for a 2–1 home league defeat by Rotherham United.

On 16 December, Gordon registered his first assist for Everton, as Jarrad Branthwaite scored from his free-kick in a 1–1 draw with Chelsea. On 2 January 2022, he scored his first goals for the Toffees in a 3–2 loss to Brighton & Hove Albion. On 12 February, in a 3–0 win over Leeds United, he assisted Michael Keane for Everton's second goal, before scoring their third in the second half. On 9 April, Gordon scored the only goal of the game in a win over Manchester United. In May, he was named Young Player of the Year by the senior team and the club's supporters. During the 2022 summer transfer window, he was linked with Chelsea.

Gordon scored his first goals of the season in back-to-back matches against Brentford and Leeds United. He was suspended for the match against Tottenham Hotspur, because of yellow card accumulation, and returned in a 1–0 defeat to Newcastle United. He had a scuffle with Kieran Trippier, which led to a confrontation with Fabian Schär, resulting in both players getting booked. (The three players were reunited soon after his transfer to Newcastle, which was noted for Gordon's awkward interaction with Schär.) In the next match, he scored Everton's second goal in a 3–0 win over Crystal Palace. Illness kept him out for three matches, and in what turned out to be his last appearance for the Toffees, he came on as a 69th-minute substitute against Southampton. After the match, he and Yerry Mina were harassed by a small section of Everton supporters. During the January transfer window, Sky Sports reported that Gordon had failed to show up to training in order to force a move away from the club to fellow Premier League club Newcastle United. Gordon later expressed he had been disappointed by the curt manner that Everton announced his departure, and stated that he "was a massive part in keeping the club up" the previous season.

=== Newcastle United ===
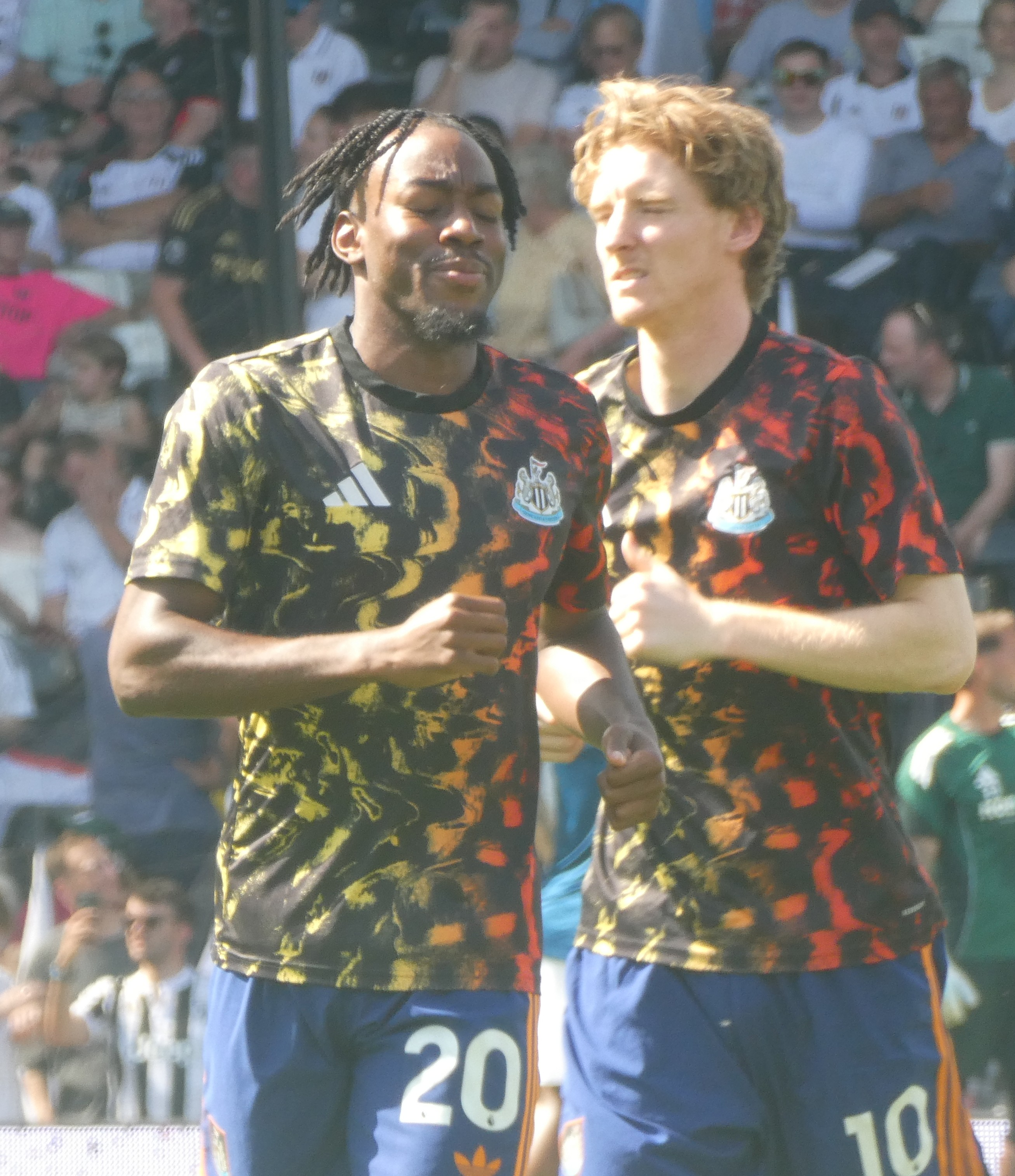
Gordon (right) warming up for Newcastle United in 2026

On 29 January 2023, Gordon joined Newcastle United on a long-term contract, having submitted a formal transfer request to previous club Everton. The transfer fee reported by BBC Sport was an initial £40 million, potentially rising to £45 million in add-ons. He made his debut on 4 February as a 69th-minute substitute in a 1–1 draw at home to West Ham United. On 4 March, Gordon was named in the starting line-up for the first time in a 2–0 loss to Manchester City, but was taken off in the 62nd minute, and an ankle injury would see him miss the next two matches. After making his return in a 2–0 win over Manchester United, he was mainly used as a substitute. On 8 April, against Brentford, he came on at half-time, but had the ignominy of being subbed off. He reacted angrily to manager Eddie Howe, who later explained that Gordon had come off as a precaution because of his ankle injury. Expecting a hostile reception upon his return to Goodison Park on 27 April, his contribution ended up being minimal, with the game already won as Newcastle were 4–1 up. On 28 May, Gordon scored his first goal for the club in a 1–1 draw with Chelsea on the final day of the 2022–23 season.

On 12 August 2023, Gordon assisted Sandro Tonali for the opening goal in a 5–1 win over Aston Villa in Newcastle's first game of the 2023–24 season. On 27 August, Gordon scored his first home goal for Newcastle in a 2–1 defeat against boyhood club Liverpool. Gordon continued his fine form over the course of the season, earning him Newcastle United's Player of the Season awards.

Although Gordon could not play in the final due to suspension, he scored goals in both legs of the 2025 EFL Cup semi-final victory against Arsenal, helping the team to become the first Newcastle United side to win a major domestic trophy in 70 years.

On 25 August 2025, Gordon became the second Premier League player since Mason Holgate to be sent off in each of the past three seasons when he committed a dangerous tackle on Virgil van Dijk after referee Simon Hooper viewed the VAR monitor when the yellow card decision was overturned. In his absence, Newcastle went on to suffer a late 3–2 defeat to Liverpool. Later that year, on 21 October, he scored in Newcastle's 3–0 home win over Benfica in the Champions League, becoming the first Newcastle player to score in three consecutive matches in the competition.

On 18 February 2026, Gordon scored four goals in an 6–1 win over Qarabağ in the UEFA Champions League play-offs, marking his first senior hat-trick and becoming the third Newcastle player to score a hat-trick in the Champions League, alongside Faustino Asprilla and Alan Shearer. He also became the first Newcastle player to score four goals in a single match in a European competition. In addition, he became only the second English player to score at least 10 goals in a single UEFA Champions League campaign, following Harry Kane, who achieved the feat in the 2024–25 season.

=== Barcelona ===
On 29 May 2026, Gordon joined La Liga club Barcelona on a five-year contract, starting from 1 July 2026. The deal was reportedly worth €80m. Later that year, on 23 August, he made his official debut, providing two assists in a 5–0 away victory against Elche. He scored his first goal for the club on 10 October 2026, in a 3–0 win against Getafe.

== International career ==
=== Youth career ===
Having represented his country at U18 and U19 level, Gordon made his debut for the England under-20s during a 2–0 victory over Wales at St George's Park on 13 October 2020.

On 5 November 2021, Gordon received his first call up for the England under-21s and scored twice on his debut, a 3–1 victory over Czech Republic at Turf Moor in 2023 UEFA European Under-21 Championship qualification on 11 November 2021.

On 14 June 2023, Gordon was included in the England squad for the 2023 UEFA European Under-21 Championship. He scored during a group stage victory over Israel and also recorded the only goal of the quarter-final against Portugal. On 8 July 2023, Gordon started in the final as England beat Spain to lift the trophy. Gordon was named Player of the Tournament and also chosen in the Team of the Tournament.

=== Senior career ===
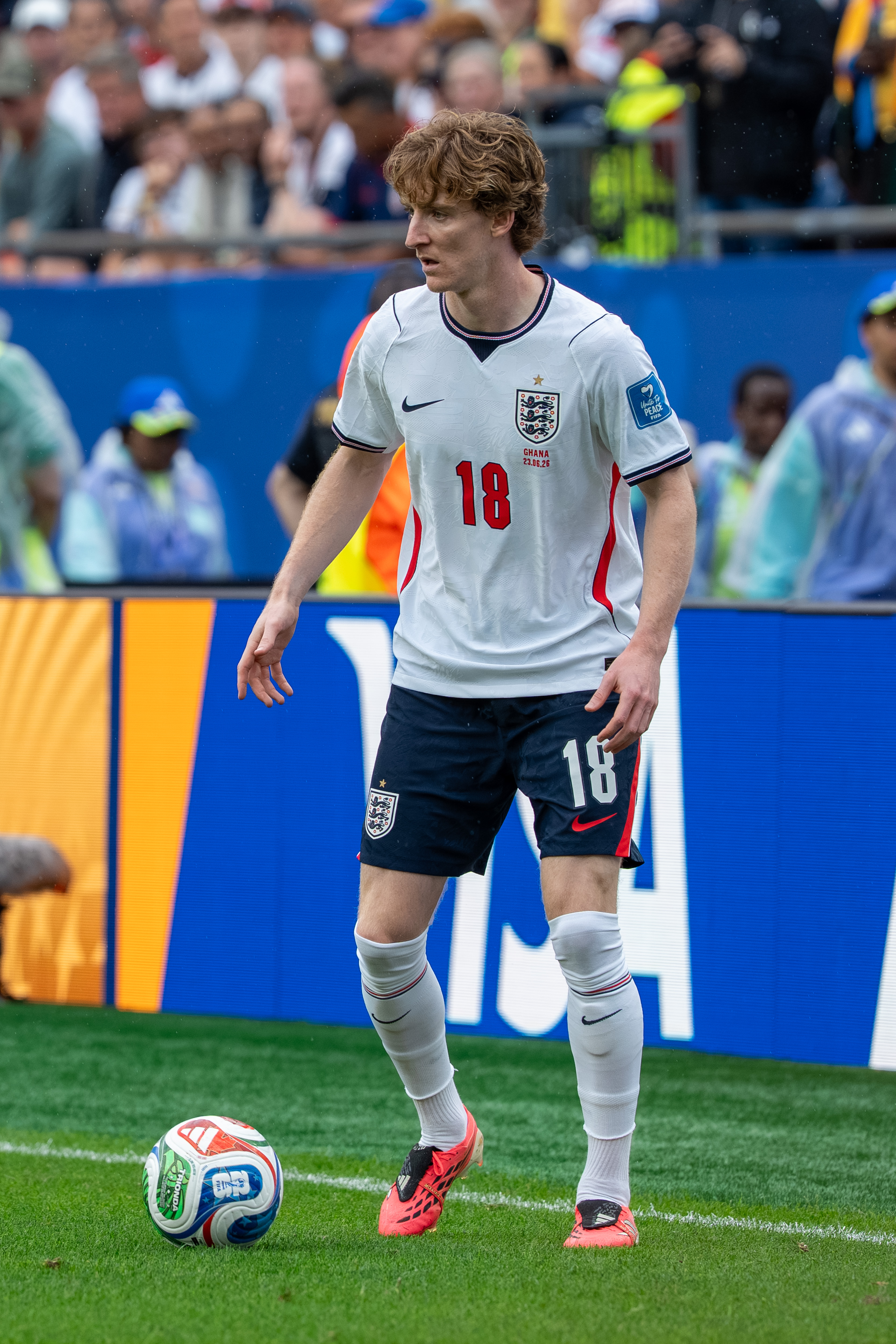
Gordon with England at the 2026 World Cup

Gordon received his first call up for the England senior squad in March 2024 for friendlies against Brazil and Belgium. He made his debut on 23 March when starting England's 1–0 defeat to Brazil at Wembley Stadium. He was named in England's 26-man squad for UEFA Euro 2024.

On 17 November 2024, Gordon scored his first senior international goal in a 5–0 UEFA Nations League victory against the Republic of Ireland.

In May 2026, Gordon was named in the 26-man squad to represent England at the 2026 FIFA World Cup. He provided two assists for goals scored by Harry Kane in a 2–1 win over DR Congo in the World Cup Round of 32. He scored the opening goal against Argentina in the semi-finals but England were eventually eliminated in a 2–1 loss.

== Personal life ==
Gordon is in a relationship with Annie Keating. He became a father in 2023. In addition to his native English, he speaks Spanish and Catalan, which he learned in preparation to play for FC Barcelona.

Gordon has spoken about the importance of books in driving his success, citing The Art of Winning by former New Zealand rugby player Dan Carter.

== Career statistics ==
=== Club ===
As of match played 22 November 2026

Appearances and goals by club, season and competition
Club	Season	League			National cup (Note: Includes FA Cup, Copa del Rey)		League cup (Note: Includes EFL Cup)		Europe		Other		Total	
Club	Season	Division	Apps	Goals	Apps	Goals	Apps	Goals	Apps	Goals	Apps	Goals	Apps	Goals
Everton U21	2018–19	—			—		—		—		1 (Note: Appearances in EFL Trophy)	0	1	0
Everton U21	2019–20	—			—		—		—		3	1	3	1
Everton U21	Total		—		—		—		—		4	1	4	1
Preston North End (loan)	2020–21	Championship	11	0	—		—		—		—		11	0
Everton	2017–18	Premier League	0	0	0	0	0	0	1 (Note: Appearance in UEFA Europa League)	0	—		1	0
Everton	2018–19	Premier League	0	0	0	0	0	0	—		—		0	0
Everton	2019–20	Premier League	11	0	0	0	1	0	—		—		12	0
Everton	2020–21	Premier League	3	0	2	0	2	0	—		—		7	0
Everton	2021–22	Premier League	35	4	4	0	1	0	—		—		40	4
Everton	2022–23	Premier League	16	3	1	0	1	0	—		—		18	3
Everton	Total		65	7	7	0	5	0	1	0	—		78	7
Newcastle United	2022–23	Premier League	16	1	—		—		—		—		16	1
Newcastle United	2023–24	Premier League	35	11	4	1	3	0	6 (Note: Appearances in UEFA Champions League)	0	—		48	12
Newcastle United	2024–25	Premier League	34	6	2	1	6	2	—		—		42	9
Newcastle United	2025–26	Premier League	26	6	3	1	5	0	12	10	—		46	17
Newcastle United	Total		111	24	9	3	14	2	18	10	—		152	39
Barcelona	2026–27	La Liga	12	2	0	0	—		4	1	0	0	16	3
Career total			199	33	16	3	19	2	23	11	4	1	261	50

=== International ===
As of match played 15 November 2026

Appearances and goals by national team and year
National team	Year	Apps	Goals
England	2024	9	1
England	2025	7	1
England	2026	14	5
Total		30	7

As of match played 3 October 2026
England score listed first, score column indicates score after each Gordon goal

List of international goals scored by Anthony Gordon
No.	Date	Venue	Cap	Opponent	Score	Result	Competition	Ref.
1	17 November 2024	Wembley Stadium, London, England	9	Republic of Ireland	2–0	5–0	2024–25 UEFA Nations League B	
2	14 October 2025	Daugava Stadium, Riga, Latvia	16	Latvia	1–0	5–0	2026 FIFA World Cup qualification	
3	10 June 2026	Inter&Co Stadium, Orlando, United States	19	Costa Rica	2–0	3–0	Friendly	
4	15 July 2026	Mercedes-Benz Stadium, Atlanta, United States	25	Argentina	1–0	1–2	2026 FIFA World Cup	
5	26 September 2026	Wembley Stadium, London, England	26	Spain	1–1	2–3	2026–27 UEFA Nations League A	
6	29 September 2026	Fortuna Arena, Prague, Czechia	27	Czech Republic	1–0	2–0	2026–27 UEFA Nations League A	
7	3 October 2026	Stadion Rujevica, Rijeka, Croatia	28	Croatia	3–0	7–0	2026–27 UEFA Nations League A	

== Honours ==
Newcastle United

- EFL Cup: 2024–25

England U21

- UEFA European Under-21 Championship: 2023

England

- UEFA European Championship runner-up: 2024
- FIFA World Cup third place: 2026

Individual

- CEE Cup Player of the Tournament: 2017
- UEFA European Under-21 Championship Player of the Tournament: 2023
- UEFA European Under-21 Championship Team of the Tournament: 2023
- Newcastle United Player of the Season: 2023–24
