= Lewis Hall (footballer) =

English footballer (born 2004)

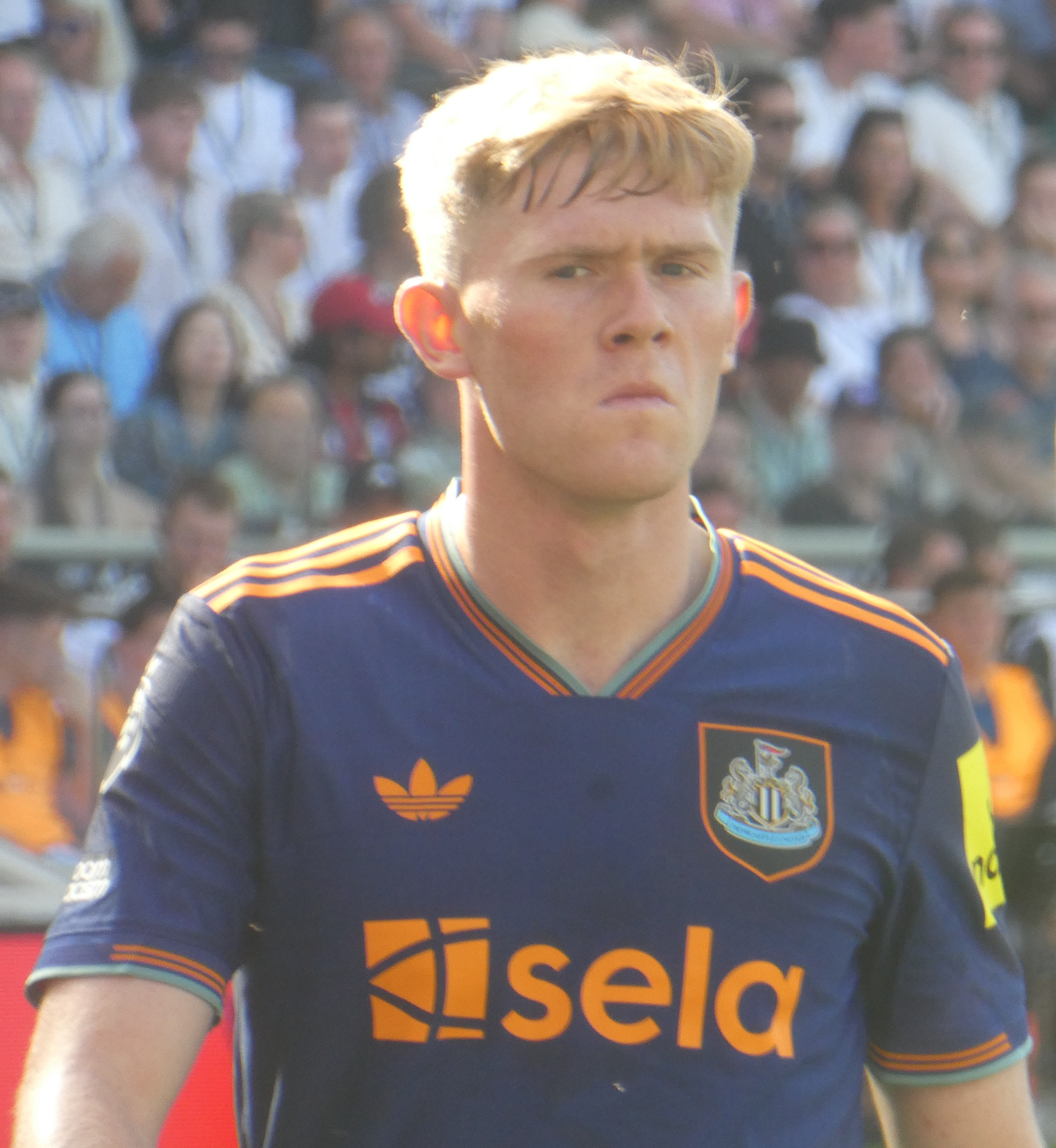
- Hall playing for Newcastle United in 2026

Personal information
- Full name: Lewis Kieran Hall
- Date of birth: 8 September 2004 (age 22)
- Place of birth: Slough, Berkshire, England
- Height: 5 ft 10 in (1.79 m)
- Positions: Left-back; midfielder

Team information
- Current team: Newcastle United
- Number: 3

Youth career
- –2012: Binfield
- 2012–2022: Chelsea

Senior career*
Years	Team	Apps	(Gls)
2022–2024	Chelsea	9	(0)
2023–2024	→ Newcastle United (loan)	18	(1)
2024–	Newcastle United	62	(2)

International career^{‡}
2019	England U15	3	(0)
2019–2020	England U16	6	(1)
2021–2022	England U18	9	(1)
2022–2023	England U19	6	(0)
2023–2024	England U20	7	(0)
2023–	England U21	7	(0)
2024–	England	9	(0)
- * Club domestic league appearances and goals as of 23:23, 19 September 2026 (UTC) ‡ National team caps and goals as of 21:50, 15 November 2026 (UTC)

Lewis Kieran Hall (born 8 September 2004) is an English professional footballer who plays as a left-back or midfielder for Premier League club Newcastle United and the England national team.

== Early life ==
Lewis Kieran Hall was born on 8 September 2004 in Slough, Berkshire. He grew up in Binfield, Berkshire, where he attended his local village school, Binfield Church of England Primary, before spending his first two years of secondary school at Licensed Victuallers' School in Ascot, then continuing his education alongside his football training at Chelsea.

== Club career ==
=== Chelsea ===
Hall started playing football at Binfield Soccer School. Joining at under-eight level, Hall signed his first scholarship with Chelsea in the summer of 2021. A regular at both under-18 and under-23 level, Hall received his maiden call-up to the first-team in December 2021, featuring as an unused substitute in Chelsea's 2–0 away EFL Cup quarter-final tie against Brentford. Just over two weeks later, on 8 January 2022, he made his professional career debut during an FA Cup third round win against Chesterfield at Stamford Bridge, providing an assist for the third goal. By starting against Chesterfield, Hall became the youngest player to start an FA Cup tie for Chelsea.

Hall made his Premier League debut on 12 November 2022, starting in a 1–0 defeat to Newcastle United. He made ten further first team appearances that season, and won Chelsea Academy Player of the Year for 2023.

=== Newcastle United ===
On 22 August 2023, Hall joined Newcastle United on a season-long loan with an obligation to buy for £28 million, plus £7 million in add-ons. He made his debut in an 8–0 away win against Sheffield United on 24 September. On 1 November, he scored his first goal for Newcastle in a 3–0 EFL Cup win against Manchester United at Old Trafford. On 15 May 2024, he scored his first Premier League goal in a 3–2 loss to Manchester United. Later that year, on 1 July, he signed a permanent contract with Newcastle after activating his obligation to buy clause.

During the 2024–25 season, Hall became the club's first-choice left-back. After suffering a foot injury against Liverpool in February 2025, Hall was ruled out for the rest of the season.

On 11 September 2026, he signed a new five-year contract with Newcastle.

== International career ==
Hall has represented England from under-15 to under-21 level.

On 21 September 2022, Hall made his debut for the England U19 team during a 2–0 2023 UEFA European Under-19 Championship qualifying win over Montenegro in Denmark.

On 24 May 2023, Hall was named in a preparation camp for England U21 players ahead of 2023 European Championship. On 10 June, he made his debut for the England U21 team during a behind-closed-doors friendly match against Japan at St. George's Park. On 12 October, Hall made his debut for the England U20 team during a 2–0 away defeat to Romania.

On 7 November 2024, Hall received his first senior international call-up for the matches against Greece and the Republic of Ireland. He made his senior debut on 14 November, coming on as a half-time substitute in a 3–0 win against Greece.

== Personal life ==
Lewis is the younger brother of fellow footballer, Connor Hall. He is also a cricketer, previously playing with his local club, Binfield CC. He grew up a Newcastle supporter, as his father and uncle are from the North East.

== Career statistics ==
=== Club ===
As of match played 19 September 2026

Appearances and goals by club, season and competition
Club	Season	League			FA Cup		EFL Cup		Europe		Other		Total	
Club	Season	Division	Apps	Goals	Apps	Goals	Apps	Goals	Apps	Goals	Apps	Goals	Apps	Goals
Chelsea U23	2021–22	—			—		—		—		2 (Note: Appearances in EFL Trophy)	0	2	0
Chelsea U23	2022–23	—			—		—		—		3	1	3	1
Chelsea U23	Total		—		—		—		—		5	1	5	1
Chelsea	2021–22	Premier League	0	0	1	0	0	0	0	0	0	0	1	0
Chelsea	2022–23	Premier League	9	0	1	0	1	0	0	0	—		11	0
Chelsea	Total		9	0	2	0	1	0	0	0	0	0	12	0
Newcastle United (loan)	2023–24	Premier League	18	1	1	0	2	1	1 (Note: Appearance(s) in UEFA Champions League)	0	—		22	2
Newcastle United	2024–25	Premier League	27	0	1	0	6	0	—		—		34	0
Newcastle United	2025–26	Premier League	30	1	3	0	3	0	10	0	—		46	1
Newcastle United	2026–27	Premier League	5	1	0	0	2	0	—		—		7	1
Newcastle United	Total		62	2	4	0	11	0	10	0	—		87	2
Career total			89	3	7	0	14	1	11	0	5	1	126	5

=== International ===
As of match played 15 November 2026

Appearances and goals by national team and year
National team	Year	Apps	Goals
England	2024	2	0
England	2026	7	0
Total		9	0

== Honours ==
Newcastle United

- EFL Cup: 2024–25

Individual

- Chelsea Academy Player of the Season: 2022–23
