= Sean Longstaff =

English footballer (born 1997)

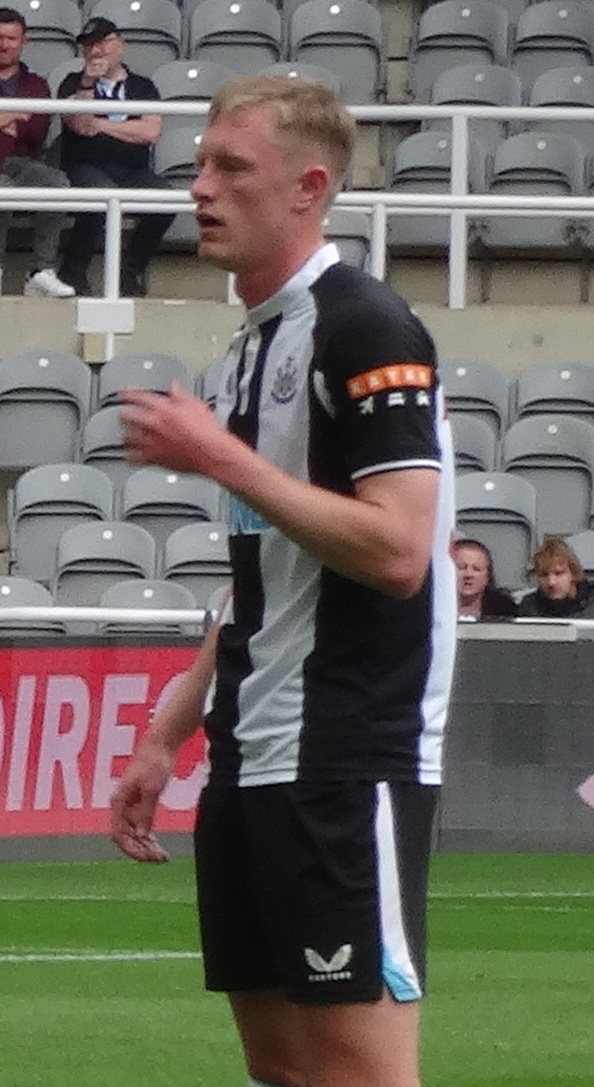
- Longstaff with Newcastle United in 2021

Personal information
- Full name: Sean David Longstaff
- Date of birth: 30 October 1997 (age 29)
- Place of birth: North Shields, England
- Height: 5 ft 11 in (1.80 m)
- Position: Midfielder

Team information
- Current team: Leeds United
- Number: 8

Youth career
- 2006–2016: Newcastle United

Senior career*
Years	Team	Apps	(Gls)
2016–2025	Newcastle United	171	(10)
2017	→ Kilmarnock (loan)	16	(3)
2017–2018	→ Blackpool (loan)	42	(8)
2025–	Leeds United	24	(2)
- * Club domestic league appearances and goals as of 18:26, 5 September 2026 (UTC)

Sean David Longstaff (born 30 October 1997) is an English professional footballer who plays as a midfielder for Premier League club Leeds United.

== Career ==
=== Newcastle United ===
Longstaff began his career with the youth team of Newcastle United at 9 years old. He moved on loan to Scottish Premiership club Kilmarnock in January 2017, along with Callum Roberts and Freddie Woodman. In July 2017, he signed on loan for EFL League One club Blackpool for the 2017–18 season, where he made 45 appearances and scored nine goals.

His first goal for the Newcastle United first team was on 17 July 2018, when he opened the scoring in a 2–0 win over St Patrick's Athletic in a pre-season friendly at Richmond Park. Longstaff impressed manager Rafa Benítez in pre-season and was rewarded with a four-year contract in November 2018. Longstaff made his competitive first team debut against Nottingham Forest in the second round of the EFL Cup in August 2018, before making his Premier League debut as a second-half substitute against Liverpool at Anfield the following December. This was followed up by his first goal in an FA Cup third round replay against Blackburn Rovers, before he put in a memorable performance by winning the penalty that gave Newcastle a 2–1 win over champions Manchester City in January 2019.

On 26 February 2019, Longstaff scored his first Premier League goal for Newcastle in a 2–0 win over Burnley.

In March 2019, Longstaff was ruled out for the rest of the 2018–19 season, following a knee ligament injury.

On 31 January 2023, he scored a brace in a 2–1 win over Southampton in the EFL Cup semi-final second leg to qualify his club to their first final since 1999.

On 4 October 2023, he scored his first UEFA Champions League goal, in a 4–1 win over Paris Saint-Germain at St James' Park.

On 16 March 2025, Longstaff appeared on the bench in the 2025 EFL Cup final as Newcastle won their first major domestic trophy in 70 years. Longstaff scored the winning penalty in the penalty shootout away to Nottingham Forest in the second round of the competition to help the club on their way to success.

=== Leeds United ===
On 18 July 2025, Longstaff signed a reported four-year deal worth a reported £12m plus potential add-ons with Leeds United, ending his long stint at Newcastle United.

On 8 March 2026, Longstaff scored the game-winning goal in a 3–0 victory against Norwich City at Elland Road to send Leeds United to the FA Cup quarterfinal for the first time since 2003.

== Personal life ==
Raised in North Shields, Longstaff's younger brother Matty is a footballer who plays for CF Montréal. Their father David is a former Great Britain ice hockey player, who featured over 100 times for the national side, and was a coach for the Whitley Warriors until the end of the 2022–23 season. On his father's side, Longstaff is a second cousin of former England international Alan Thompson. They are not related to former Newcastle academy player Luis Longstaff.

Longstaff's father stated that both Sean and Matty are lifelong fans of Newcastle United. His brother Harry supports Kettering Town.

Longstaff is a keen cricket player who has turned out for Tynemouth Cricket Club.

== Career statistics ==
As of match played 25 August 2026

Appearances and goals by club, season and competition
Club	Season	League			National cup (Note: Includes FA Cup, Scottish Cup)		League cup (Note: Includes EFL Cup)		Other		Total	
Club	Season	Division	Apps	Goals	Apps	Goals	Apps	Goals	Apps	Goals	Apps	Goals
Newcastle United	2018–19	Premier League	9	1	3	1	1	0	—		13	2
Newcastle United	2019–20	Premier League	23	1	6	1	0	0	—		29	2
Newcastle United	2020–21	Premier League	22	0	1	0	4	0	—		27	0
Newcastle United	2021–22	Premier League	24	1	1	0	1	0	—		26	1
Newcastle United	2022–23	Premier League	33	1	1	0	7	2	—		41	3
Newcastle United	2023–24	Premier League	35	6	4	1	2	0	5 (Note: Appearances in UEFA Champions League)	1	46	8
Newcastle United	2024–25	Premier League	25	0	2	0	5	0	—		32	0
Newcastle United	Total		171	10	18	3	20	2	5	1	214	16
Kilmarnock (loan)	2016–17	Scottish Premiership	16	3	1	0	0	0	—		17	3
Blackpool (loan)	2017–18	League One	42	8	1	0	1	0	1 (Note: Appearance in EFL Trophy)	1	45	9
Leeds United	2025–26	Premier League	23	2	4	1	1	0	—		28	3
Leeds United	2026–27	Premier League	1	0	0	0	1	0	—		2	0
Leeds United	Total		24	2	4	1	1	0	0	0	30	3
Career total			253	23	24	3	23	2	6	2	306	30

== Honours ==
Newcastle United

- EFL Cup: 2024–25; runner-up: 2022–23
