= Sandro Tonali =

Italian footballer (born 2000)

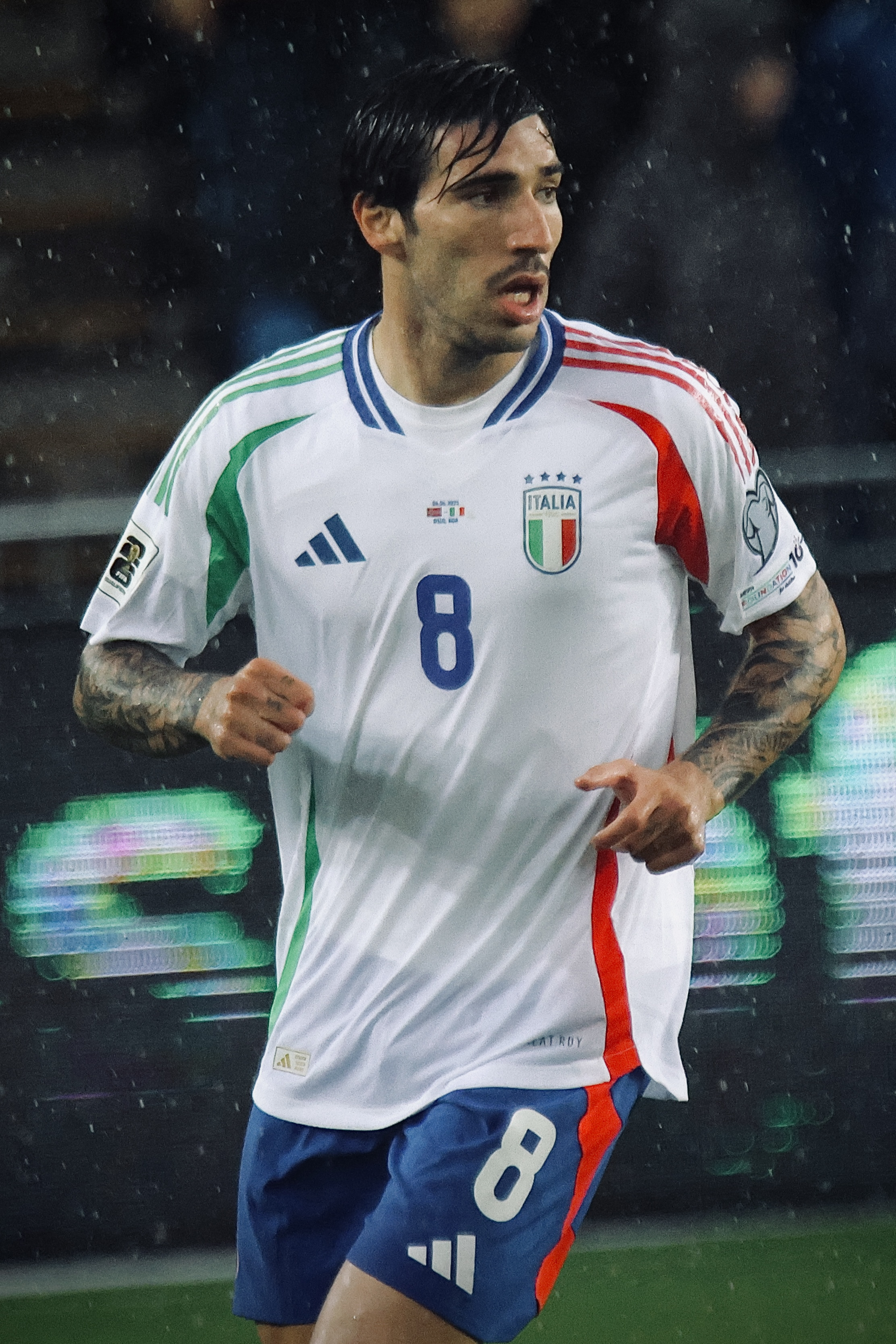
- Tonali with Italy in 2025

Personal information
- Full name: Sandro Tonali
- Date of birth: 8 May 2000 (age 26)
- Place of birth: Lodi, Italy
- Height: 1.81 m (5 ft 11 in)
- Position: Midfielder

Team information
- Current team: Tottenham Hotspur
- Number: 16

Youth career
- 2009–2012: Piacenza
- 2012–2017: Brescia

Senior career*
Years	Team	Apps	(Gls)
2017–2021	Brescia	88	(6)
2020–2021	→ AC Milan (loan)	25	(0)
2021–2023	AC Milan	70	(7)
2023–2026	Newcastle United	79	(5)
2026–	Tottenham Hotspur	10	(0)

International career^{‡}
2018	Italy U19	12	(0)
2019–2023	Italy U21	14	(0)
2019–	Italy	38	(4)
Medal record
Men's football
Representing Italy
UEFA European Under-19 Championship
Runner-up	2018 Finland
- * Club domestic league appearances and goals as of 23:37, 7 November 2026 (UTC) ‡ National team caps and goals as of 15 November 2026

Sandro Tonali (Italian pronunciation: [ˈsandro toˈnaːli]; born 8 May 2000) is an Italian professional footballer who plays as a midfielder for Premier League club Tottenham Hotspur and the Italy national team.

He began his professional career at Brescia, winning Serie B in 2018–19. A year later he moved to Milan, initially on loan. He played 130 total games for Milan, and won Serie A in 2021–22. In 2023, he signed for Newcastle for a reported fee of €70 million, becoming the most expensive Italian footballer of all time.

== Club career ==
=== Brescia ===
Tonali made his professional debut for Brescia Calcio on 26 August 2017, aged 17, coming on as a substitute in the Serie B away match lost 2–1 against Avellino. On 28 April 2018 he scored his first professional career goal, in a 4–2 defeat against Salernitana in Serie B. He obtained 19 league appearances in total during his first season as a professional player, scoring two goals and providing two assists during the 2017–18 Serie B season.

The following season, Tonali won the Serie B title with Brescia, and achieved promotion to Serie A, featuring as a starter for the club throughout the entire 2018–19 season.

He made his Serie A debut on 25 August 2019, aged 19, in a 1–0 away win against Cagliari. On 29 September, he assisted Mario Balotelli's goal from a corner kick in a 2–1 away loss to Napoli; he also scored a goal during the match with a powerful shot from outside the area, which was disallowed by VAR, however, for a foul by Brescia's Dimitri Bisoli on Napoli's Nikola Maksimović. He scored his first Serie A goal on 26 October, netting a long-range free kick into the top corner from the left flank, which was the opening goal in an eventual 3–1 away defeat to Genoa.

=== AC Milan ===
==== 2020–2021: loan ====
On 9 September 2020, Tonali joined AC Milan, on a season-long loan for €10 million with an option to buy for €15 million, plus bonuses worth €10 million. The player will earn a yearly wage of €2 million for five years. Three days later, he made his non-competitive debut in a friendly at Milanello against his previous club.

Tonali made his competitive debut for Milan on 17 September 2020, coming on as a substitute in the 83rd minute in a 2–0 victory against Shamrock Rovers FC in the second round of Europa League qualifying. He made his Serie A debut for Milan on 21 September 2020, coming off the bench in the 77th minute in a 2–0 victory over Bologna FC 1909 at the San Siro. Tonali finished the season with 37 appearances, 23 of those in the starting eleven.

==== 2021–2022: Serie A champion ====
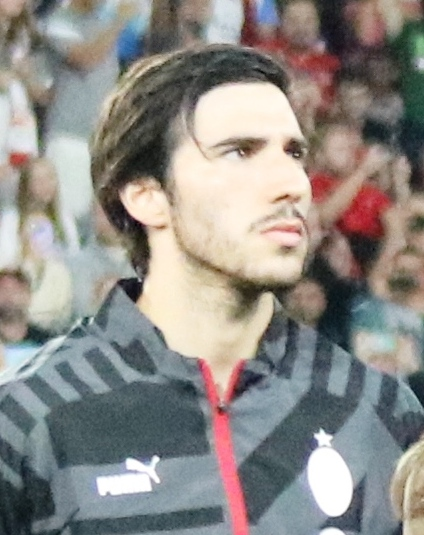
Tonali lining up for AC Milan in 2022

On 8 July 2021, Milan officially purchased Tonali's rights from Brescia and he signed a five-year contract with the club. He took a pay-cut to secure his childhood dream move to Milan and was praised by the fans on social media for this gesture.

Tonali scored his first goal with Milan's shirt on 29 August 2021 against Cagliari, a free kick that opened the scoresheet in eventual 4–1 win. On 3 October at Gewiss Stadium against Atalanta, Tonali dispossessed the ball from Remo Freuler and ran to the opponents box to score the second goal in eventual 3–2 victory for Milan. On 25 February 2022, Tonali assisted Rafael Leão's goal against Udinese, becoming the youngest midfielder to have scored more than one goal (two) and delivered more than one assist (two) in Serie A that season.

On 24 April as the match against Lazio was heading to 1–1 draw, Tonali scored the winner in the stoppage time, securing the lead for his team in Serie A table. On 8 May 2022, his 22nd birthday, Tonali scored an equalising and a winning goal in the 3–1 away Serie A victory against Hellas Verona. The comeback victory brought Milan back on top of the Serie A following Inter's 48-hour stay there in a close championship race. Tonali is also the youngest midfielder to have scored five or more goals in Serie A that season (and the second-youngest among all players, older only than Bologna's Aaron Hickey). After 3–0 away win against Sassuolo on 22 May, Milan secured their first Scudetto in 11 years, In total, Tonali played 36 games in the campaign, scoring 5 goals and providing 3 assists.

Tonali's performance that season brought the attention and praise of renowned Italian football pundits, the likes of Paolo Di Canio, Roberto Donadoni and Fabio Capello, the latter went on to state that Tonali would have found a place in even the greatest of Milan's generation in the past.

=== Newcastle United ===
On 3 July 2023, Premier League club Newcastle United announced the signing of Tonali on a five-year contract, for an undisclosed fee. Reported to be around €70 million, this made Tonali the most expensive Italian player of all time.

On 18 July, he made his debut for Newcastle in Allan McGregor's testimonial match against Rangers. On 12 August, he scored the opening goal on his Premier League debut in a 5–1 win over Aston Villa.

On 18 October 2023, Newcastle announced Tonali was being investigated by the Italian Prosecutor's Office and the Italian Football Federation for alleged illegal betting activity. On 26 October, he was banned from playing football for 10 months for breaching Italian betting regulations. This included eight months in gambling rehabilitation. This meant he would miss the rest of the 2023–24 season and UEFA Euro 2024. In March 2024, he was charged with misconduct in relation to alleged breaches of the Football Association's betting rules. The FA alleged that Tonali broke rules by placing bets on matches between 12 August and 12 October 2023. He was handed an additional two-month suspended ban by the FA for these breaches in May 2024, though he was allowed to return to football in August on the condition that no further breaches were made during the 2024–25 season.

On 28 August 2024, after serving his suspension, Tonali made his first appearance since October the previous year, playing 61 minutes of a 1–1 draw against Nottingham Forest in the third round of the EFL Cup. Four days later, he made his Premier League return, appearing as a 68th minute substitute for Sean Longstaff in a 2–1 win over Tottenham Hotspur.

On 16 March 2025, Tonali became part of the first Newcastle United side to win a major domestic trophy in 70 years when he played the full 90 minutes in the 2025 EFL Cup final. Tonali had scored two goals in the quarter-final against Brentford to help the club reach the final.

In October 2025, it was reported that Tonali had signed a contract extension with Newcastle United during his betting ban, extending his deal until 2029 with an option for a further year to 2030.

=== Tottenham Hotspur ===
On 6 July 2026, Tonali signed for Tottenham Hotspur for a transfer fee of £100 million. He made his Spurs debut on 22 August in a 3–0 Premier League defeat to Brentford.

== International career ==
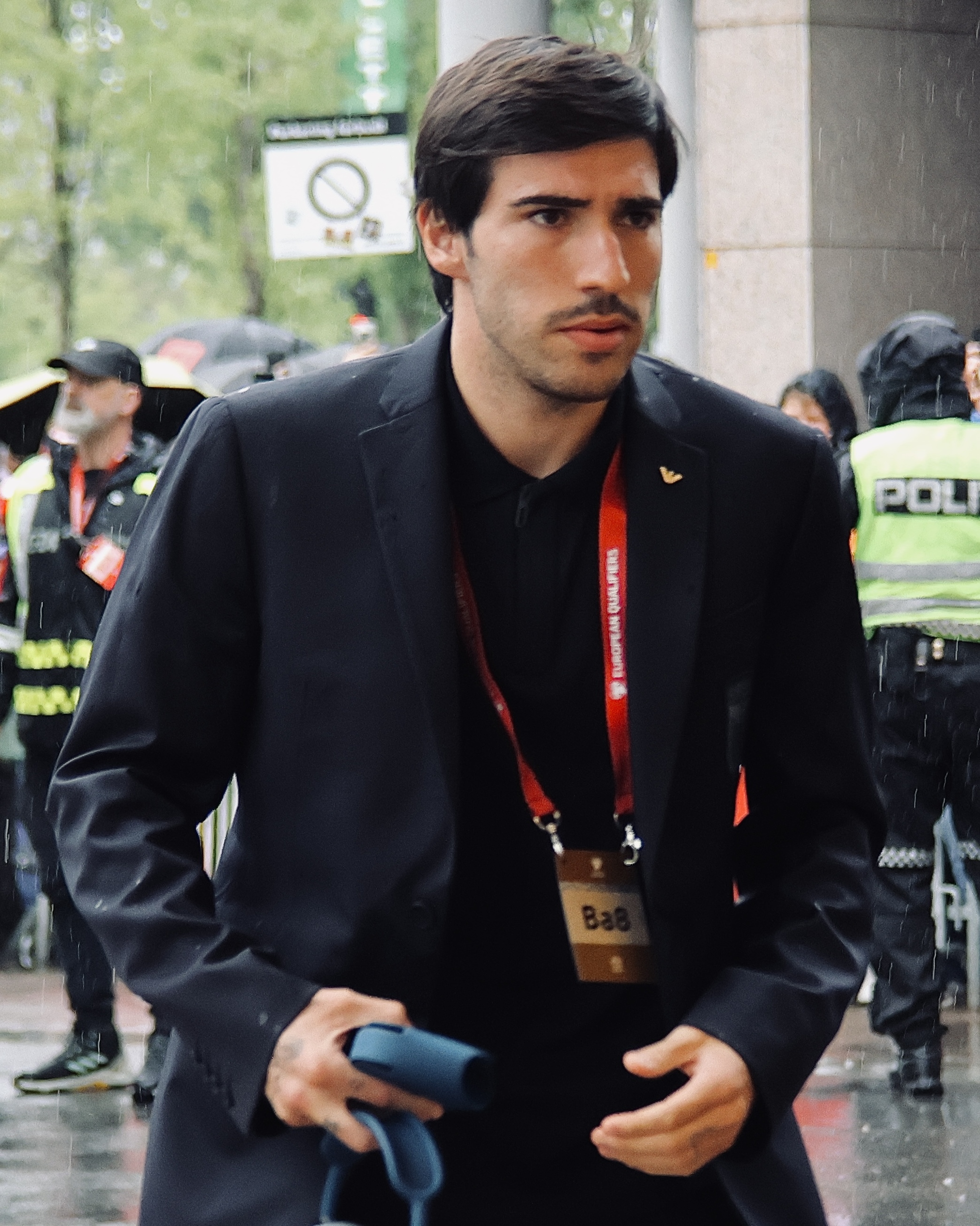
Tonali with Italy in 2025

With the Italy U19 team, Tonali took part in the 2018 European Under-19 Championship, reaching the final of the tournament, where Italy lost 4–3 after extra time against Portugal. On 21 March 2019, he made his debut with the Italy U21 in a goalless friendly draw against Austria in Trieste. Tonali took part in the 2019 European Under-21 Championship.

In November 2018, Tonali received his first call-up to the Italian senior squad by manager Roberto Mancini. On 10 October 2019, after appearing for the Italy U21 team in a goalless draw against Ireland in a European qualifier, he was called up to the Italy senior squad once again the following day for the team's Euro 2020 qualifiers against Greece and Liechtenstein.

Tonali made his senior international debut on 15 October 2019, coming on as a substitute in the 5–0 away victory against Liechtenstein in Vaduz. On 15 November, he started for the team in a 3–0 away victory against Bosnia and Herzegovina of the same tournament.

== Style of play ==
Regarded as a promising player in his youth by the media, Tonali has been described by pundits as a regista, although he is also described as a versatile midfielder, who is capable of playing in several roles. In his youth, he was often likened to Andrea Pirlo – who also started his career with Brescia – in terms of his movement, coordination, appearance, technical qualities, position, and playing style. Considered to be a strong, fast, energetic, elegant, and creative midfielder, with an ability to read the game, Tonali usually plays in a central or defensive midfield role as a deep-lying playmaker in a 4–3–3 formation. Dictating plays for Brescia with his passing in midfield, he set up two goals and scored two himself in his 19 appearances in Serie B during the 2017–18 season. Although naturally right-footed, he is known for his long passing ability with either foot. Moreover, he is also adept at taking set-pieces. He is also known to play as a box-to-box midfielder, while his creativity, ability to find space, make late runs, and his penchant for driving forward with the ball saw him deployed in a more advanced role on occasion at Milan under manager Stefano Pioli, namely as a mezzala.

In addition to Pirlo, Tonali has also cited Steven Gerrard and Luka Modrić as influences, and has also compared his own playing style to that of Gennaro Gattuso. In July 2019, he was named by UEFA as one of the 50 promising young players to watch for the 2019–20 season.

== Personal life ==
Tonali has been an AC Milan fan since childhood.

On 1 July 2025, Tonali married Juliette Pastore. On 8 January 2026, they welcomed their first child, Leonardo.

== Career statistics ==
=== Club ===
As of match played 7 November 2026

Appearances and goals by club, season and competition
Club	Season	League			National cup (Note: Includes Coppa Italia, FA Cup)		League cup (Note: Includes EFL Cup)		Europe		Other		Total	
Club	Season	Division	Apps	Goals	Apps	Goals	Apps	Goals	Apps	Goals	Apps	Goals	Apps	Goals
Brescia	2017–18	Serie B	19	2	0	0	—		—		—		19	2
Brescia	2018–19	Serie B	34	3	0	0	—		—		—		34	3
Brescia	2019–20	Serie A	35	1	1	0	—		—		—		36	1
Brescia	Total		88	6	1	0	—						89	6
AC Milan (loan)	2020–21	Serie A	25	0	1	0	—		11 (Note: Appearances in UEFA Europa League)	0	—		37	0
AC Milan	2021–22	Serie A	36	5	3	0	—		6 (Note: Appearances in UEFA Champions League)	0	—		45	5
AC Milan	2022–23	Serie A	34	2	1	0	—		12	0	1 (Note: Appearance in Supercoppa Italiana)	0	48	2
AC Milan	Milan total		95	7	5	0	—		29	0	1	0	130	7
Newcastle United	2023–24	Premier League	8	1	0	0	1	0	3	0	—		12	1
Newcastle United	2024–25	Premier League	36	4	3	0	6	2	—		—		45	6
Newcastle United	2025–26	Premier League	35	0	3	2	4	0	11	1	—		53	3
Newcastle United	Total		79	5	6	2	11	2	14	1	—		110	10
Tottenham Hotspur	2026–27	Premier League	10	0	0	0	0	0	—		—		10	0
Career total			272	18	12	2	11	2	43	1	1	0	339	23

=== International ===
As of match played 15 November 2026

Appearances and goals by national team and year
National team	Year	Apps	Goals
Italy	2019	3	0
Italy	2020	1	0
Italy	2021	2	0
Italy	2022	6	0
Italy	2023	3	0
Italy	2024	6	1
Italy	2025	9	2
Italy	2026	8	1
Total		38	4

As of match played 26 March 2026
Italy score listed first, score column indicates score after each Tonali goal.

List of international goals scored by Sandro Tonali
No.	Date	Venue	Cap	Opponent	Score	Result	Competition
1	14 November 2024	King Baudouin Stadium, Brussels, Belgium	20	Belgium	1–0	1–0	2024–25 UEFA Nations League A
2	20 March 2025	San Siro, Milan, Italy	22	Germany	1–0	1–2	2024–25 UEFA Nations League A
3	8 September 2025	Nagyerdei Stadion, Debrecen, Hungary	27	Israel	5–4	5–4	2026 FIFA World Cup qualification
4	26 March 2026	Stadio di Bergamo, Bergamo, Italy	31	Northern Ireland	1–0	2–0	2026 FIFA World Cup qualification

== Honours ==
Brescia

- Serie B: 2018–19

AC Milan

- Serie A: 2021–22

Newcastle United

- EFL Cup: 2024–25

Italy U19

- UEFA European Under-19 Championship runner-up: 2018

Individual

- UEFA European Under-19 Championship Team of the Tournament: 2018
- Serie B Footballer of the Year: 2018
- Serie B Best Young Player: 2019
- Italian Golden Boy Award: 2020
- IFFHS Men's World Youth (U20) Team: 2020
- Serie A Player of the Month: May 2022
- Premio Bulgarelli Number 8: 2022
- EA Sports FIFA 23 Serie A Team of the Season: 2022–23
