= 2026–27 Newcastle United F.C. season =

134th season in existence of Newcastle United FC

Newcastle United
2026–27 season
- Owner: Public Investment Fund (85%); RB Sports & Media (15%)
- Chairman: Yasir Al-Rumayyan
- Head coach: Matthias Jaissle
- Stadium: St James' Park
- Premier League: 12th
- FA Cup: Third round
- EFL Cup: Fourth round
- Top goalscorer: League: Harvey Barnes; Anthony Elanga; Joe Willock (2 each); All: Harvey Barnes (4)
- Highest home attendance: 52,647 (v. Hull City, Premier League, 19 September 2026)
- Lowest home attendance: 51,405 (v. West Bromwich Albion, EFL Cup, 26 August 2026)
- Average home league attendance: 52,565
- Biggest win: 2–0 v. Tottenham Hotspur (A), Premier League, 29 August 2026; 2–0 v. Crystal Palace (A), Premier League, 25 October 2026
- Biggest defeat: 1–4 v. Leeds United (A), Premier League, 14 September 2026; 1–4 v. Coventry City (A), Premier League, 12 October 2026
Home colours	Away colours	Third colours

The 2026–27 season is the 134th season in the history of Newcastle United Football Club, and their tenth consecutive season in the Premier League. In addition to the domestic league, the club is also participating in the FA Cup and the EFL Cup.

== Managerial changes ==
On 31 July 2026, Eddie Howe stepped down as head coach. Six days later, he was replaced by Matthias Jaissle.

== Squad ==
Note: Flags indicate national team as has been defined under FIFA eligibility rules. Players may hold more than one non-FIFA nationality.

Squad no.	Player	Nationality	Position(s)	Date of birth (age)	Date signed	Previous club
Goalkeepers
1	Nick Pope	(England)	GK	19 April 1992 (aged 35)	23 June 2022	(England) Burnley
21	Lukáš Horníček	(Czech Republic)	GK	13 July 2002 (aged 24)	3 August 2026	(Portugal) Braga
24	Ewen Jaouen	(France)	GK	29 December 2005 (aged 21)	15 June 2026	(France) Reims
29	Mark Gillespie	(England)	GK	27 March 1992 (aged 35)	3 July 2020	(Scotland) Motherwell
Defenders
2	Tino Livramento	(England)	RB / LB	12 November 2002 (aged 24)	8 August 2023	(England) Southampton
3	Lewis Hall	(England)	LB / LWB / CM	8 September 2004 (aged 22)	22 August 2023 (Note: Hall signed on loan on 22 August 2023, which turned into a permanent deal on 1 July 2024.)	(England) Chelsea
4	Sven Botman	(Netherlands)	CB	12 January 2000 (aged 27)	1 July 2022	(France) Lille
5	Fabian Schär	(Switzerland)	CB	20 December 1991 (aged 35)	26 July 2018	(Spain) Deportivo La Coruña
12	Malick Thiaw	(Germany)	CB / RB / DM	8 August 2001 (aged 25)	12 August 2025	(Italy) Milan
33	Dan Burn	(England)	CB / LB	9 May 1992 (aged 35)	31 January 2022	(England) Brighton & Hove Albion
37	Amar Dedić	(Bosnia and Herzegovina) (Note: Dedić was born in Zell am See, Austria.)	RB / LB	18 August 2002 (aged 24)	18 August 2026	(Portugal) Benfica
Midfielders
6	Nico González	(Spain)	DM / CM	3 January 2002 (aged 25)	26 August 2026	(England) Manchester City
7	Joelinton	(Brazil)	CM / LW / CF	16 August 1996 (aged 30)	23 July 2019	(Germany) TSG Hoffenheim
8	Aladji Bamba	(France)	DM / CM	14 July 2006 (aged 20)	24 July 2026	(France) Monaco
14	Sean Steur	(Netherlands)	CM / DM / AM	11 January 2008 (aged 19)	5 July 2026	(Netherlands) Ajax
23	Jacob Murphy	(England)	RW / RWB	24 February 1995 (aged 32)	19 July 2017	(England) Norwich City
28	Joe Willock	(England)	CM / AM	20 August 1999 (aged 27)	13 August 2021	(England) Arsenal
41	Jacob Ramsey	(England)	CM / AM / LW	28 May 2001 (aged 26)	17 August 2025	(England) Aston Villa
67	Lewis Miley	(England)	CM / DM / RB	1 May 2006 (aged 21)	1 May 2023	Academy
Forwards
9	Yoane Wissa	(Democratic Republic of the Congo) (Note: Wissa was born in Épinay-sous-Sénart, France.)	CF / AM / LW	3 September 1996 (aged 30)	1 September 2025	(England) Brentford
10	William Osula	(Denmark)	CF / RW / LW	4 August 2003 (aged 23)	8 August 2024	(England) Sheffield United
11	Harvey Barnes	(England)	LW / RW	9 December 1997 (aged 29)	23 July 2023	(England) Leicester City
17	Bazoumana Touré	(Ivory Coast)	LW / RW	2 March 2006 (aged 21)	9 July 2026	(Germany) TSG Hoffenheim
19	Anthony Elanga	(Sweden)	RW / LW / CF	27 April 2002 (aged 25)	11 July 2025	(England) Nottingham Forest
20	Matias Fernandez-Pardo	(Belgium)	CF / AM / LW / RW	3 February 2005 (aged 22)	1 September 2026	(France) Lille
The following Academy players that have previously been named in a Newcastle United squad for a competitive match
44	Kyran Thompson	(England)	RW / LW / CF	6 September 2009 (aged 17)	28 August 2026 (Note: Thompson signed his first professional contract with Newcastle United on 6 September 2026.)	(England) Arsenal
47	Park Seung-soo	(South Korea)	LW / RW	7 March 2008 (aged 19)	24 July 2025	(South Korea) Suwon Samsung Bluewings
48	Miodrag Pivaš	(Serbia)	CB / DM	17 May 2005 (aged 22)	20 July 2024	(Serbia) Jedinstvo Ub
49	Vakhtang Salia	(Georgia (country))	CF / AM / LW	30 August 2007 (aged 19)	30 August 2025	(Georgia (country)) Dinamo Tbilisi
50	Trevan Sanusi	(England)	LW / RW	25 April 2007 (aged 20)	1 September 2023 (Note: Sanusi signed his first professional contract with Newcastle United on 14 May 2024.)	(England) Birmingham City
70	Sam Alabi	(England)	CM	9 July 2009 (aged 17)	1 July 2023 (Note: Alabi signed his first professional contract with Newcastle United on 9 July 2026.)	(England) Oldham Athletic
76	Mason Miley	(England)	CM / DM / RB	29 September 2008 (aged 18)	10 July 2026	Academy
77	Michael Mills	(England)	LW	18 February 2009 (aged 18)	1 July 2023 (Note: Mills signed his first professional contract with Newcastle United on 18 February 2026.)	(England) Port Vale
Out on loan
27	Nick Woltemade	(Germany)	CF / AM	14 February 2002 (aged 25)	30 August 2025	(Germany) VfB Stuttgart
30	Harrison Ashby	(Scotland) (Note: Ashby was born in Milton Keynes, England.)	RB	14 November 2001 (aged 25)	31 January 2023	(England) West Ham United
31	Aidan Harris	(England)	GK	16 December 2006 (aged 20)	12 July 2024	Academy
51	Leo Shahar	(England)	RB	18 March 2007 (aged 20)	1 September 2023 (Note: Shahar signed his first professional contract with Newcastle United on 14 May 2024.)	(England) Wolverhampton Wanderers
62	Sean Neave	(England)	CF	27 May 2007 (aged 20)	12 July 2024	Academy
—	Odysseas Vlachodimos	(Greece) (Note: Vlachodimos was born in Stuttgart, Germany.)	GK	26 April 1994 (aged 33)	1 July 2024	(England) Nottingham Forest
—	Alex Murphy	(Republic of Ireland)	LB / CB	25 June 2004 (aged 23)	10 June 2022	(Republic of Ireland) Galway United
—	Antonio Cordero	(Spain)	LW / RW / AM	14 November 2006 (aged 20)	1 July 2025	(Spain) Málaga

== Transfers and contracts ==
=== Transfers in ===
Date	Position	Player	From	Fee	Ref.
First team
15 June 2026 (Note: The transfer was announced on 10 June and would become official on June 15 once the transfer window opened.)	GK	(France) Ewen Jaouen	(France) Reims	£18,500,000	
5 July 2026	LW	(Ivory Coast) Bazoumana Touré	(Germany) TSG Hoffenheim	£42,800,000	
9 July 2026	CM	(Netherlands) Sean Steur	(Netherlands) Ajax	£19,600,000 (Note: A further £3,000,000 in add-ons.)	
24 July 2026	CDM	(France) Aladji Bamba	(France) Monaco	£30,000,000 (Note: A further £5,500,000 in add-ons.)	
3 August 2026	GK	(Czech Republic) Lukáš Horníček	(Portugal) Braga	£25,700,000	
18 August 2026	RB	(Bosnia and Herzegovina) Amar Dedić	(Portugal) Benfica	£30,700,000	
26 August 2026	CDM	(Spain) Nico González	(England) Manchester City	£47,000,000 (Note: A further £3,000,000 in add-ons.)	
1 September 2026	CF	(Belgium) Matias Fernandez-Pardo	(France) Lille	£51,000,000	
Academy
20 July 2026	CF	(Guinea-Bissau) Afner Cá	(Spain) Levante	Free	
28 August 2026	RW	(England) Kyran Thompson	(England) Arsenal	Free	
28 August 2026	CM	(England) Christian Boothe	(England) Leicester City	Undisclosed	
28 August 2026	RB	(England) Kyle Healy-Matthews	(England) West Ham United	Undisclosed	
4 September 2026	CDM	(Guinea) Ousmane Diabaté	(Turkey) Gençlerbirliği	Undisclosed	
Total				£265,300,000 (Note: Excluding potential add-ons, bonuses, undisclosed figures and future transfers.)	

=== Transfers out ===
Date	Position	Player	To	Fee	Ref.
First team
1 July 2026 (Note: The transfer was announced on 29 May and would become official on July 1 once the La Liga transfer window opened.)	LW	(England) Anthony Gordon	(Spain) Barcelona	£69,300,000	
6 July 2026	CDM	(Italy) Sandro Tonali	(England) Tottenham Hotspur	£100,000,000 (Note: Includes £7,500,000 in add-ons.)	
16 July 2026	CAM	(England) Joe White	(England) Crewe Alexandra	Undisclosed	
8 August 2026	CM	(Brazil) Bruno Guimarães	(England) Arsenal	£75,000,000	
Academy
15 June 2026 (Note: The transfer was announced on 3 June and would become official on June 15 once the Eredivisie transfer window opened.)	CM	(Norway) Travis Hernes	(Netherlands) Groningen	Undisclosed	
Total				£236,800,000 (Note: Excluding potential add-ons, bonuses, undisclosed figures and future transfers.)	

=== Loans in ===
Date from	Position	Player	From	Date until	Fee	Ref.
First team
Academy

=== Loans out ===
Date from	Position	Player	To	Date until	Fee	Ref.
First team
1 July 2026	GK	(Greece) Odysseas Vlachodimos	(Spain) Sevilla	End of season	Free	
9 July 2026	RB	(Scotland) Harrison Ashby	(England) Luton Town	End of season	Free	
11 August 2026	LB	(Republic of Ireland) Alex Murphy	(Germany) 1. FC Kaiserslautern	End of season	Free	
1 September 2026	CF	(Germany) Nick Woltemade	(Italy) Juventus	End of season	£3,500,000	
Academy
11 July 2026	LW	(Spain) Antonio Cordero	(Spain) Cádiz	End of season	Free	
17 August 2026	CM	(England) Anthony Munda	(England) Swindon Town	End of season	Free	
29 August 2026	CM	(Republic of Ireland) Rory Finneran	(England) Notts County	End of season	Free	
2 September 2026	CF	(England) Sean Neave	(England) Wolverhampton Wanderers	End of season	Free	
4 September 2026	CDM	(Guinea) Ousmane Diabaté	(Turkey) Gençlerbirliği	End of season	Free	
4 September 2026	RB	(England) Leo Shahar	(Portugal) Arouca	End of season	Free	
22 October 2026	GK	(England) Aidan Harris	(England) Hebburn Town	22 November 2026	Free	

=== Released / Out of Contract ===
Date	Position	Player	Subsequent club	Joined date	Ref.
First team
30 June 2026	RB	(England) Kieran Trippier	(England) Wolverhampton Wanderers	1 July 2026	
30 June 2026	LB	(England) Matt Targett	(England) Hull City	23 July 2026	
30 June 2026	GK	(England) John Ruddy	(England) Wolverhampton Wanderers	27 August 2026	
30 June 2026	GK	(England) Max Thompson	(England) Hartlepool United	29 September 2026	
30 June 2026	RB	(Sweden) Emil Krafth			
Academy
30 June 2026	CB	(Scotland) Charlie McArthur	(England) York City	1 July 2026	
30 June 2026	RB	(England) Ezra Tika-Lemba	(England) Middlesbrough	1 July 2026	
30 June 2026	CB	(England) Ciaran Thompson	(England) Darlington	24 July 2026	
30 June 2026	CF	(England) Joe Brayson	(United States) George Washington Colonials	1 August 2026	
30 June 2026	LB	(England) Thomas Bryant	(England) Darlington	8 August 2026	
30 June 2026	GK	(England) James Taylor	(England) Hemel Hempstead Town	8 August 2026	
30 June 2026	GK	(England) Adam Harrison	(England) Wolverhampton Wanderers	13 August 2026	
30 June 2026	GK	(England) Will Anderson	(England) South Shields	14 August 2026	
30 June 2026	CAM	(England) Kayden Lucas	(England) West Bromwich Albion	18 August 2026	
30 June 2026	RW	(England) Darren Palmer	(England) Spennymoor Town	3 October 2026	
30 June 2026	CAM	(England) Alfie Harrison	(Scotland) Dundee	7 October 2026	
30 June 2026	CM	(England) Jude Cogdon			
30 June 2026	CM	(England) Alex O'Donovan			
30 June 2026	CM	(England) Matthew Taylor			

=== New contracts ===
Date	Position	Player	Contract expiry	Ref.
First team
25 May 2026	CM	(England) Lewis Miley	30 June 2032	
2 June 2026	CB	(Switzerland) Fabian Schär	30 June 2027	
27 July 2026	LW	(England) Harvey Barnes	Undisclosed	
11 September 2026	LB	(England) Lewis Hall	30 June 2031	
Academy
9 July 2026	CM	(England) Sam Alabi	Undisclosed (Note: First professional contract)	
10 July 2026	CM	(England) Mason Miley	Undisclosed	
14 July 2026	RW	(England) Guy Bloomer	Undisclosed	
14 July 2026	LB	(England) Jake Durrant	Undisclosed	
14 July 2026	CB	(England) Henry Johnson	Undisclosed	
14 July 2026	CF	(England) Kacey Wooster	Undisclosed	
6 September 2026	RW	(England) Kyran Thompson	Undisclosed	
28 September 2026	GK	(England) George Mair	Undisclosed	
20 October 2026	LW	(England) Alfie Seldon	Undisclosed	

== Pre-season and friendlies ==
On 28 May, Newcastle United announced they would head to Edinburgh, Scotland to face fellow Premier League side Everton. On 25 June, four further friendlies were confirmed against Darlington, Gateshead, Bristol City and Valencia. In July, it was announced that St James' Park would host a VisitMalta Weekender against Bayer Leverkusen and Strasbourg.

Win Draw Loss Fixtures

18 July 2026 Friendly	Newcastle United	3−0	Darlington	Benton
12:30 BST	Willock 29'; Osula 35' (pen.); Neave 67'	Report		Stadium: Darsley Park; Attendance: 0 (BCD)

25 July 2026 Friendly	Gateshead	1–1	Newcastle United	Gateshead
12:30 BST	Supyk 34'	Report	Williams 79' (o.g.)	Stadium: Gateshead International Stadium

29 July 2026 Friendly	Bristol City	4−1	Newcastle United	Ashton Gate
19:30 BST	Greenwood 26'; Tolaj 29'; Bird 50'; Botman 81' (o.g.)	Report	Barnes 78'	Stadium: Ashton Gate Stadium; Attendance: 21,509; Referee: Paul Tierney (England)

8 August 2026 Trofeu Taronja	Valencia	1–2	Newcastle United	Valencia, Spain
21:00 CEST	Ugrinić 4'; Gayà (red card) 35'	Report	Wissa 52', 76'; J.Murphy (yellow card) 87'	Stadium: Mestalla Stadium; Attendance: 41,383; Referee: José María Sánchez Martínez (Spain)

12 August 2026 Friendly	Newcastle United	1–3	Everton	Edinburgh, Scotland
17:15 BST	Barnes 85'	Report	Barry 27'; Ndiaye 36' (pen.); Alcaraz (yellow card) 66'; George 73'	Stadium: Scottish Gas Murrayfield Stadium; Attendance: 22,982; Referee: Nick Walsh (Scotland)

15 August 2026 VisitMalta Weekender	Newcastle United	1–2	Bayer Leverkusen	Newcastle upon Tyne
15:00 BST	Thiaw 44'	Report	Maza 1'; Boniface 82'	Stadium: St James' Park; Attendance: 39,059; Referee: Michael Oliver (England)

16 August 2026 VisitMalta Weekender	Newcastle United	1–1 (2–3 p)	Strasbourg	Newcastle upon Tyne
16:00 BST	Osula 38'	Report	Yassine 69'	Stadium: St James' Park; Attendance: 34,076; Referee: Anthony Backhouse (England)
	Penalties
	Osula (penalty missed); Ramsey (penalty missed); Neave (penalty scored); Touré (penalty scored); Bamba (penalty missed)		(penalty missed) Reyna; (penalty scored) Yassine; (penalty scored) Amougou; (penalty missed) Del Blanco; (penalty scored) Diop

== Competitions ==
=== Overall record ===
Competition	First match	Last match	Starting round	Final position	Record							
Competition	First match	Last match	Starting round	Final position	Pld	W	D	L	GF	GA	GD	Win %
Premier League	23 August 2026	30 May 2027	Matchday 1	TBD	10	3	3	4	13	16	−3	30.00
FA Cup	January 2027	TBD	Third round	TBD	0	0	0	0	0	0	+0	—
EFL Cup	26 August 2026	29 October 2026	Second round	Fourth round	3	2	0	1	5	5	+0	66.67
Total					13	5	3	5	18	21	−3	38.46

Last updated: 7 November 2026
Source: Soccerway

=== Premier League ===
==== League table ====
Pos	Team	Pld	W	D	L	GF	GA	GD	Pts
10	Brentford	10	3	5	2	16	11	+5	14
11	Aston Villa	11	3	5	3	14	17	−3	14
12	Newcastle United	11	3	4	4	15	18	−3	13
13	Coventry City	11	4	0	7	13	21	−8	12
14	Hull City	10	2	5	3	11	11	0	11

Updated to match(es) played on 21 November 2026. Source: Premier League
Rules for classification: 1) Points; 2) Goal difference; 3) Goals scored; 4) If the champions, relegated teams or qualified teams for UEFA competitions cannot be determined by rules 1 to 3 following the completion of the competition, rules 4.1 to 4.3 are applied between such teams – 4.1) Head-to-head points; 4.2) Head-to-head away goals; 4.3) Play-off at a neutral site.

==== Results summary ====
Overall								Home						Away					
Pld	W	D	L	GF	GA	GD	Pts	W	D	L	GF	GA	GD	W	D	L	GF	GA	GD
11	3	4	4	15	18	−3	13	1	3	2	8	9	−1	2	1	2	7	9	−2

Last updated: 21 November 2026.
Source: Soccerway

==== Results by round ====
Round	1	2	3	4	5	6	7	8	9	10	11	12	13	14	15	16	17	18	19	20	21	22	23	24	25	26	27	28	29	30	31	32	33	34	35	36	37	38
Ground	H	A	H	A	H	A	H	A	H	A	H	A	H	H	A	A	H	H	A	A	H	A	H	A	H	A	H	A	A	H	A	H	H	A	H	A	H	A
Result	D	W	D	L	W	L	L	W	L	D	D																											
Position	11	6	7	12	9	11	11	8	13	12																												
Points	1	4	5	5	8	8	8	11	11	12	13																											

Updated to match(es) played on 21 November 2026. Source: Soccerway
A = Away; H = Home; W = Win; D = Draw; L = Loss; P = Postponed

==== Matches ====
On 19 June 2026, the Premier League fixtures were announced.

Win Draw Loss Fixtures

23 August 2026 1	Newcastle United	2–2	Liverpool	Newcastle upon Tyne
16:30 BST	Elanga 5'; Wissa (yellow card) 25'; L. Miley (yellow card) 34'; Willock 57'; Ramsey (yellow card) 64'; Murphy (yellow card) 79'; Horníček (yellow card) 90+3'	Report	Kerkez (yellow card) 30'; Frimpong (yellow card) 30'; Gakpo 55'; Van Dijk (yellow card) 90'; Szoboszlai 90+9' (pen.)	Stadium: St James' Park; Attendance: 52,630; Referee: Stuart Attwell

29 August 2026 2	Tottenham Hotspur	0–2	Newcastle United	Tottenham
17:30 BST	Van de Ven (yellow card) 3'	Report	González (yellow card) 13'; Elanga 62'; Wissa 72'; Botman (yellow card) 79'	Stadium: Tottenham Hotspur Stadium; Attendance: 61,025; Referee: Peter Bankes
Note: Fixture was initially scheduled for a 15:00 kick-off, but was moved for live Sky Sports broadcast.

5 September 2026 3	Newcastle United	2–2	Bournemouth	Newcastle upon Tyne
12:30 BST	Elanga (yellow card) 28'; Barnes 37'; Wissa (yellow card) 57'; Ramsey 88'	Report	Tavernier 9'; Thiaw 35' (o.g.); Kluivert (yellow card) 66'; Truffert (yellow card) 87'; Smith (yellow card) 90+4'	Stadium: St James' Park; Attendance: 52,643; Referee: Robert Jones
Note: Fixture was initially scheduled for a 15:00 kick-off, but was brought forward for live TNT Sports broadcasting.

14 September 2026 4	Leeds United	4–1	Newcastle United	Leeds
20:00 BST	L. Miley 32' (o.g.); Calvert-Lewin 34', 45+1', (yellow card) 44'; Okafor 59'	Report	Murphy (yellow card) 54'; Touré 90'; Livramento (yellow card) 90+1'	Stadium: Elland Road; Attendance: 36,693; Referee: Michael Salisbury
Note: Fixture was initially scheduled for 12 September, but was rescheduled for live Sky Sports broadcasting.

19 September 2026 5	Newcastle United	2–1	Hull City	Newcastle upon Tyne
15:00 BST	Willock 3'; Hall 7'; Wissa (penalty missed) 45+2'; Murphy (yellow card) 45+3'	Report	Crooks (yellow card) 29'; Belloumi (yellow card) 39'; Tzolakis (yellow card) 45+2'; Giles (yellow card) 49'; Cho 67'	Stadium: St James' Park; Attendance: 52,647; Referee: Tony Harrington

12 October 2026 6	Coventry City	4–1	Newcastle United	Coventry
20:00 BST	Rudoni 6' (pen.); Cherif 48'; Van Ewijk (yellow card) 66'; Simms 81'; Mfuni 86'	Report	Botman 70'; Joelinton (yellow card) 81'	Stadium: Coventry Building Society Arena; Attendance: 30,811; Referee: John Brooks
Note: Fixture was initially scheduled for 10 October, but was rescheduled for live Sky Sports broadcasting.

17 October 2026 7	Newcastle United	0–1	Aston Villa	Newcastle upon Tyne
17:30 BST	Joelinton (yellow card) 18'; Botman (yellow card) 18'; González (yellow card) 53'; Wissa (yellow card) 55'; Osula (yellow card) 78'; Thiaw (yellow card) 86'	Report	João Gomes (yellow card) 25'; Alysson (yellow card) 28'; Manzambi 36'	Stadium: St James' Park; Attendance: 52,626; Referee: Jarred Gillett
Note: Fixture was initially scheduled for a 15:00 kick-off, but was pushed back for live Sky Sports broadcasting.

25 October 2026 8	Crystal Palace	0–2	Newcastle United	Selhurst
14:00 BST	Pino (yellow card) 75'; Khalaili (yellow card) 79'	Report	González (yellow card) 36'; Schär (yellow card) 45+1'; Osula 47'; Barnes 58'; Hall (yellow card) 78'	Stadium: Selhurst Park; Attendance: 25,018; Referee: Paul Tierney
Note: Fixture was initially scheduled for 24 October, but was rescheduled for live Sky Sports broadcasting.

2 November 2026 9	Newcastle United	0–1	Everton	Newcastle upon Tyne
20:00 GMT	Burn (yellow card) 32'; Ramsey (yellow card) 90+6' (yellow-red card) 90+8'; Schär (yellow card) 90+9'	Report	Barry 49'; George (yellow card) 52'; Johnson (yellow card) 90+9'	Stadium: St James' Park; Attendance: 52,279; Referee: John Brooks
Note: Fixture was initially scheduled for 31 October, but was rescheduled for live Sky Sports broadcasting.

7 November 2026 10	Fulham	1–1	Newcastle United	Fulham
15:00 GMT	Muniz 83'	Report	Murphy 80'; Schär (yellow card) 90'; Dedić (yellow card) 90+2'	Stadium: Craven Cottage; Attendance: 27,367; Referee: Robert Jones

21 November 2026 11	Newcastle United	2–2	Arsenal	Newcastle upon Tyne
17:30 GMT	Dedić (yellow card) 23'; Barnes 49', (yellow card) 58'; Thiaw 62'; Burn (yellow card) 81'	Report	Eze 33'; Rice (yellow card) 56'; Madueke 78', (yellow card) 81'; Gyökeres (yellow card) 90+10'	Stadium: St James' Park; Attendance: 52,661; Referee: Chris Kavanagh
Note: Fixture was initially scheduled for a 15:00 kick-off, but was pushed back for live Sky Sports broadcasting.

29 November 2026 12	Brighton & Hove Albion	v	Newcastle United	Brighton and Hove
14:05 GMT				Stadium: Falmer Stadium
Note: Fixture was initially scheduled for 28 November, but was pushed back a day for live Sky Sports broadcasting.

2 December 2026 13	Newcastle United	v	Manchester United	Newcastle upon Tyne
20:15 GMT				Stadium: St James' Park
Note: Fixture was initially scheduled for a 20:00 kick-off, but was pushed back for live Sky Sports broadcasting.

6 December 2026 14	Newcastle United	v	Sunderland	Newcastle upon Tyne
14:00 GMT				Stadium: St James' Park
Note: Fixture was initially scheduled for 5 December, but was pushed back a day for live Sky Sports broadcasting.

12 December 2026 15	Ipswich Town	v	Newcastle United	Ipswich
15:00 GMT				Stadium: Portman Road

19 December 2026 16	Brentford	v	Newcastle United	Brentford
12:30 GMT				Stadium: Brentford Community Stadium
Note: Fixture was initially scheduled for a 15:00 kick-off, but was brought forward for live TNT Sports broadcasting.

26 December 2026 17	Newcastle United	v	Manchester City	Newcastle upon Tyne
20:00 GMT				Stadium: St James' Park
Note: Fixture was initially scheduled for 15:00, but was rescheduled for live Sky Sports broadcasting.

30 December 2026 18	Newcastle United	v	Nottingham Forest	Newcastle upon Tyne
19:30 GMT				Stadium: St James' Park
Note: Fixture was initially scheduled for 20:00, but was rescheduled for live Sky Sports broadcasting.

3 January 2027 19	Chelsea	v	Newcastle United	Fulham
14:00 GMT				Stadium: Stamford Bridge
Note: Fixture was initially scheduled for 2 January, but was rescheduled for live Sky Sports broadcasting.

7 January 2027 20	Manchester United	v	Newcastle United	Old Trafford
20:00 GMT				Stadium: Old Trafford
Note: Fixture was initially scheduled for 6 January, but was rescheduled for live Sky Sports broadcasting.

16 January 2027 21	Newcastle United	v	Fulham	Newcastle upon Tyne
15:00 GMT				Stadium: St James' Park

23 January 2027 22	Arsenal	v	Newcastle United	Holloway
17:30 GMT				Stadium: Emirates Stadium
Note: Fixture was initially scheduled for a 15:00 kick-off, but was pushed back for live Sky Sports broadcasting.

30 January 2027 23	Newcastle United	v	Brighton & Hove Albion	Newcastle upon Tyne
15:00 GMT				Stadium: St James' Park

6 February 2027 24	Everton	v	Newcastle United	Liverpool
15:00 GMT				Stadium: Hill Dickinson Stadium

10 February 2027 25	Newcastle United	v	Chelsea	Newcastle upon Tyne
20:00 GMT				Stadium: St James' Park

20 February 2027 26	Manchester City	v	Newcastle United	Manchester
15:00 GMT				Stadium: Etihad Stadium

27 February 2027 27	Newcastle United	v	Brentford	Newcastle upon Tyne
15:00 GMT				Stadium: St James' Park

3 March 2027 28	Nottingham Forest	v	Newcastle United	West Bridgford
20:00 GMT				Stadium: City Ground

13 March 2027 29	Bournemouth	v	Newcastle United	Bournemouth
15:00 GMT				Stadium: Dean Court

20 March 2027 30	Newcastle United	v	Leeds United	Newcastle upon Tyne
15:00 GMT				Stadium: St James' Park

10 April 2027 31	Liverpool	v	Newcastle United	Liverpool
15:00 BST				Stadium: Anfield

17 April 2027 32	Newcastle United	v	Tottenham Hotspur	Newcastle upon Tyne
15:00 BST				Stadium: St James' Park

24 April 2027 33	Newcastle United	v	Ipswich Town	Newcastle upon Tyne
15:00 BST				Stadium: St James' Park

1 May 2027 34	Sunderland	v	Newcastle United	Sunderland
15:00 BST				Stadium: Stadium of Light

8 May 2027 35	Newcastle United	v	Coventry City	Newcastle upon Tyne
15:00 BST				Stadium: St James' Park

15 May 2027 36	Aston Villa	v	Newcastle United	Birmingham
15:00 BST				Stadium: Villa Park

23 May 2027 37	Newcastle United	v	Crystal Palace	Newcastle upon Tyne
15:00 BST				Stadium: St James' Park

30 May 2027 38	Hull City	v	Newcastle United	Kingston upon Hull
15:00 BST				Stadium: MKM Stadium

=== FA Cup ===
Win Draw Loss Fixtures

=== EFL Cup ===
As a Premier League club not involved in any European competitions, Newcastle entered the EFL Cup in the second round, and were drawn at home to West Bromwich Albion. They were then drawn away to Millwall in the third round, and away to Everton in the fourth round.

Win Draw Loss Fixtures

26 August 2026 Second round	Newcastle United	3–2	West Bromwich Albion	Newcastle upon Tyne
19:45 BST	Steur (yellow card) 18'; Touré 38'; Barnes 48', 81'; Jaouen (yellow card) 77'; Ramsey (yellow card) 89'	Report	Price 19', 77' (pen.); Nzingoula (yellow card) 52'; Diakité (yellow card) 55'; Stewart (yellow card) 62'	Stadium: St James' Park; Attendance: 51,405; Referee: Bobby Madley

8 September 2026 Third round	Millwall	0–1	Newcastle United	Bermondsey
20:00 BST	Metcalfe (yellow card) 67'; Massey (yellow card) 90+1'	Report	Ramsey (yellow card) 69'; Willock 81'	Stadium: The Den; Attendance: 14,698; Referee: Craig Pawson

29 October 2026 Fourth round	Everton	3–1	Newcastle United	Liverpool
19:45 GMT	Garner 34'; Hackney 45', (yellow card) 60'; Barry 69'; Dewsbury-Hall (yellow card) 74'; Mykolenko (yellow card) 81'; Tarkowski (yellow card) 89'; Pickford (yellow card) 89'	Report	Schär (yellow card) 81'; Burn 88', (yellow card) 89'; Joelinton (yellow card) 89'	Stadium: Hill Dickinson Stadium; Attendance: 51,894; Referee: Farai Hallam

== Statistics ==
=== Appearances and goals ===
As of match played 7 November 2026

Players with no appearances are not included on the list, italics indicate a loaned in player

No.	Pos	Nat	Player	Total		Premier League		FA Cup		EFL Cup	
No.	Pos	Nat	Player	Apps	Goals	Apps	Goals	Apps	Goals	Apps	Goals
2	DF	(England) ENG	Tino Livramento	3	0	0+2	0	0+0	0	0+1	0
3	DF	(England) ENG	Lewis Hall	13	1	10+0	1	0+0	0	3	0
4	DF	(Netherlands) NED	Sven Botman	9	1	7+0	1	0+0	0	2	0
5	DF	(Switzerland) SUI	Fabian Schär	7	0	2+3	0	0+0	0	2	0
6	MF	(Spain) ESP	Nico González	10	0	8+0	0	0+0	0	2	0
7	MF	(Brazil) BRA	Joelinton	6	0	3+1	0	0+0	0	0+2	0
8	MF	(France) FRA	Aladji Bamba	3	0	0+3	0	0+0	0	0	0
9	FW	(Democratic Republic of the Congo) COD	Yoane Wissa	13	1	8+2	1	0+0	0	1+2	0
10	FW	(Denmark) DEN	William Osula	7	1	4+2	1	0+0	0	1	0
11	FW	(England) ENG	Harvey Barnes	13	4	10+0	2	0+0	0	2+1	2
12	DF	(Germany) GER	Malick Thiaw	10	0	8+1	0	0+0	0	1	0
14	MF	(Netherlands) NED	Sean Steur	11	0	3+5	0	0+0	0	1+2	0
17	FW	(Ivory Coast) CIV	Bazoumana Touré	8	2	0+6	1	0+0	0	1+1	1
19	FW	(Sweden) SWE	Anthony Elanga	9	2	4+2	2	0+0	0	0+3	0
20	FW	(Belgium) BEL	Matias Fernandez-Pardo	7	0	4+2	0	0+0	0	0+1	0
21	GK	(Czech Republic) CZE	Lukáš Horníček	12	0	10+0	0	0+0	0	2	0
23	MF	(England) ENG	Jacob Murphy	12	1	5+4	1	0+0	0	3	0
24	GK	(France) FRA	Ewen Jaouen	1	0	0+0	0	0+0	0	1	0
28	MF	(England) ENG	Joe Willock	13	3	7+3	2	0+0	0	3	1
33	DF	(England) ENG	Dan Burn	6	1	3+2	0	0+0	0	1	1
37	DF	(Bosnia and Herzegovina) BIH	Amar Dedić	11	0	7+1	0	0+0	0	3	0
41	MF	(England) ENG	Jacob Ramsey	8	1	0+5	1	0+0	0	3	0
67	MF	(England) ENG	Lewis Miley	10	0	7+1	0	0+0	0	0+2	0
Player(s) who left on loan but featured this season
27	FW	(Germany) GER	Nick Woltemade	2	0	0+1	0	0	0	1	0

=== Discipline ===
As of match played 7 November 2026

Rank	No.	Pos.	Player	Premier League			FA Cup			EFL Cup			Total			
Rank	No.	Pos.	Player	Yellow card	(yellow card) (yellow-red card)	Red card	Yellow card	(yellow card) (yellow-red card)	Red card	Yellow card	(yellow card) (yellow-red card)	Red card	Yellow card	(yellow card) (yellow-red card)	Red card	
1	41	CM	(England) Jacob Ramsey	1	1	0	0	0	0	2	0	0	3	1	0	
2	5	CB	(Switzerland) Fabian Schär	3	0	0	0	0	0	1	0	0	4	0	0	
3	6	CDM	(Spain) Nico González	3	0	0	0	0	0	0	0	0	3	0	0	
3	7	CM	(Brazil) Joelinton	2	0	0	0	0	0	1	0	0	3	0	0	
3	9	CF	(Democratic Republic of the Congo) Yoane Wissa	3	0	0	0	0	0	0	0	0	3	0	0	
3	23	RW	(England) Jacob Murphy	3	0	0	0	0	0	0	0	0	3	0	0	
7	4	CB	(Netherlands) Sven Botman	2	0	0	0	0	0	0	0	0	2	0	0	
7	33	CB	(England) Dan Burn	1	0	0	0	0	0	1	0	0	2	0	0	
9	2	RB	(England) Tino Livramento	1	0	0	0	0	0	0	0	0	1	0	0	
9	3	LB	(England) Lewis Hall	1	0	0	0	0	0	0	0	0	1	0	0	
9	12	CB	(Germany) Malick Thiaw	1	0	0	0	0	0	0	0	0	1	0	0	
9	14	CM	(Netherlands) Sean Steur	0	0	0	0	0	0	1	0	0	1	0	0	
9	18	CF	(Denmark) William Osula	1	0	0	0	0	0	0	0	0	1	0	0	
9	19	RW	(Sweden) Anthony Elanga	1	0	0	0	0	0	0	0	0	1	0	0	
9	21	GK	(Czech Republic) Lukáš Horníček	1	0	0	0	0	0	0	0	0	1	0	0	
9	24	GK	(France) Ewen Jaouen	0	0	0	0	0	0	1	0	0	1	0	0	
9	37	RB	(Bosnia and Herzegovina) Amar Dedić	1	0	0	0	0	0	0	0	0	1	0	0	
9	67	CM	(England) Lewis Miley	1	0	0	0	0	0	0	0	0	1	0	0	
9	Totals				25	1	0	0	0	0	6	0	0	31	1	0

== Awards ==
=== Player Awards ===
==== Premier League Player of the Month ====
Month	Pos.	Player	Pld	G	A	CS	S	Result	Ref.
August	FW	(Democratic Republic of the Congo) Yoane Wissa	2	1	1	–	–	Nominated	

==== Premier League Goal of the Month ====
Month	Pos.	Player	Opposition	Result	Ref.
August	MF	(England) Joe Willock	v. Liverpool	Nominated	
August	FW	(Sweden) Anthony Elanga	v. Tottenham Hotspur	Won	
September	FW	(England) Harvey Barnes	v. Bournemouth	Nominated	
October	DF	(Netherlands) Sven Botman	v. Coventry City	Nominated	
