= 2025–26 Newcastle United F.C. season =

133rd season in existence of Newcastle United FC

Newcastle United
2025–26 season
- Owner: Public Investment Fund (85%); RB Sports & Media (15%)
- Chairman: Yasir Al-Rumayyan
- Head coach: Eddie Howe
- Stadium: St James' Park
- Premier League: 12th
- FA Cup: Fifth round
- EFL Cup: Semi-finals
- UEFA Champions League: Round of 16
- Top goalscorer: League: Bruno Guimarães (9); All: Anthony Gordon (17)
- Highest home attendance: 52,514 (v. Everton, Premier League, 28 February 2026)
- Lowest home attendance: 51,109 (v. Manchester City, FA Cup, 7 March 2026)
- Average home league attendance: 52,161
- Biggest win: 6–1 v. Qarabağ (A), UEFA Champions League, 18 February 2026
- Biggest defeat: 2–7 v. Barcelona (A), UEFA Champions League, 18 March 2026
Home colours	Away colours	Third colours

The 2025–26 season was the 133rd season in the history of Newcastle United Football Club, and their ninth consecutive season in the Premier League. In addition to the domestic league, the club also participated in the FA Cup, the EFL Cup and the UEFA Champions League.

== Kits ==
Home	Home Alt.	Home Alt. 2

Away	Away Alt.	Away Alt. 2

Third	Third Alt.

== Squad ==
Note: Flags indicate national team as has been defined under FIFA eligibility rules. Players may hold more than one non-FIFA nationality.

Squad no.	Player	Nationality	Position(s)	Date of birth (age)	Signed in	Previous club
Goalkeepers
1	Nick Pope	(England)	GK	19 April 1992 (aged 34)	2022	(England) Burnley
26	John Ruddy	(England)	GK	24 October 1986 (aged 39)	2024	(England) Birmingham City
29	Mark Gillespie	(England)	GK	27 March 1992 (aged 34)	2020	(Scotland) Motherwell
32	Aaron Ramsdale	(England)	GK	14 May 1998 (aged 28)	2025 (Note: Ramsdale signed on loan in August 2025, which has an option to turn into a permanent deal in July 2026.)	(England) Southampton (On Loan)
Defenders
2	Kieran Trippier	(England)	RB	19 September 1990 (aged 35)	2022	(Spain) Atlético Madrid
3	Lewis Hall	(England)	LB / LWB / CM	8 September 2004 (aged 21)	2023 (Note: Hall signed on loan in August 2023, which turned into a permanent deal in July 2024.)	(England) Chelsea
4	Sven Botman	(Netherlands)	CB	12 January 2000 (aged 26)	2022	(France) Lille
5	Fabian Schär	(Switzerland)	CB	20 December 1991 (aged 34)	2018	(Spain) Deportivo La Coruña
12	Malick Thiaw	(Germany)	CB / RB / DM	8 August 2001 (aged 24)	2025	(Italy) Milan
17	Emil Krafth	(Sweden)	RB / CB	2 August 1994 (aged 31)	2019	(France) Amiens
21	Tino Livramento	(England)	RB / LB	12 November 2002 (aged 23)	2023	(England) Southampton
33	Dan Burn	(England)	CB / LB	9 May 1992 (aged 34)	2022	(England) Brighton & Hove Albion
37	Alex Murphy	(Republic of Ireland)	LB / CB	25 June 2004 (aged 22)	2022	(Republic of Ireland) Galway United
Midfielders
7	Joelinton	(Brazil)	CM / LW / ST	16 August 1996 (aged 29)	2019	(Germany) TSG Hoffenheim
8	Sandro Tonali	(Italy)	DM / CM	8 May 2000 (aged 26)	2023	(Italy) Milan
10	Anthony Gordon	(England)	LW / RW / AM / ST	24 February 2001 (aged 25)	2023	(England) Everton
11	Harvey Barnes	(England)	LW	9 December 1997 (aged 28)	2023	(England) Leicester City
20	Anthony Elanga	(Sweden)	RW / LW / ST	27 April 2002 (aged 24)	2025	(England) Nottingham Forest
23	Jacob Murphy	(England)	RW / RWB / LW	24 February 1995 (aged 31)	2017	(England) Norwich City
28	Joe Willock	(England)	CM / AM	20 August 1999 (aged 26)	2021	(England) Arsenal
39	Bruno Guimarães	(Brazil)	CM / DM	16 November 1997 (aged 28)	2022	(France) Lyon
41	Jacob Ramsey	(England)	CM / AM / LW	28 May 2001 (aged 25)	2025	(England) Aston Villa
67	Lewis Miley	(England)	CM / DM / RB	1 May 2006 (aged 20)	2023	Academy
Forwards
9	Yoane Wissa	(Democratic Republic of the Congo) (Note: Wissa was born in Épinay-sous-Sénart, France.)	ST / AM / LW	3 September 1996 (aged 29)	2025	(England) Brentford
18	William Osula	(Denmark)	ST / RW / LW	4 August 2003 (aged 22)	2024	(England) Sheffield United
27	Nick Woltemade	(Germany)	ST / AM	14 February 2002 (aged 24)	2025	(Germany) VfB Stuttgart
The following Academy players that have previously been named in a Newcastle United squad for a competitive match
58	Aidan Harris	(England)	GK	16 December 2006 (aged 19)	2023	Academy
59	Adam Harrison	(England)	GK	20 October 2006 (aged 19)	2023	Academy
61	Leo Shahar	(England)	RB	18 March 2007 (aged 19)	2023	(England) Wolverhampton Wanderers
62	Sean Neave	(England)	ST	27 May 2007 (aged 19)	2024	Academy
64	Park Seung-soo	(South Korea)	LW / RW	7 March 2008 (aged 18)	2025	(South Korea) Suwon Samsung Bluewings
85	Sam Alabi	(England)	CM	9 July 2009 (aged 16)	2023	(England) Oldham Athletic
Out on Loan
13	Matt Targett	(England)	LB / LWB	18 September 1995 (aged 30)	2022 (Note: Targett signed on loan in January 2022, which turned into a permanent deal in June 2022.)	(England) Aston Villa
30	Harrison Ashby	(Scotland) (Note: Ashby was born in Milton Keynes, England.)	RB	14 November 2001 (aged 24)	2023	(England) West Ham United
31	Max Thompson	(England)	GK	1 August 2004 (aged 21)	2023	Academy
45	Travis Hernes	(Norway)	CM	4 November 2005 (aged 20)	2023	(England) Shrewsbury Town
60	Trevan Sanusi	(England)	LW / RW	25 April 2007 (aged 19)	2023	(England) Birmingham City
—	Odysseas Vlachodimos	(Greece) (Note: Vlachodimos was born in Stuttgart, Germany.)	GK	26 April 1994 (aged 32)	2024	(England) Nottingham Forest
—	Antonio Cordero	(Spain)	LW / RW / AM	14 November 2006 (aged 19)	2025	(Spain) Málaga
—	Joe White	(England)	AM / CM	1 October 2002 (aged 23)	2021	Academy

== Transfers and contracts ==
=== Transfers in ===
Date	Position	Player	From	Fee	Ref.
First team
11 July 2025	RW	(Sweden) Anthony Elanga	(England) Nottingham Forest	£52,000,000 (Note: A further £3,000,000 in add-ons.)	
12 August 2025	CB	(Germany) Malick Thiaw	(Italy) Milan	£30,000,000 (Note: A further £4,300,000 in add-ons.)	
17 August 2025	CM	(England) Jacob Ramsey	(England) Aston Villa	£39,000,000 (Note: A further £4,000,000 in add-ons.)	
30 August 2025	ST	(Germany) Nick Woltemade	(Germany) VfB Stuttgart	£65,000,000 (Note: A further £4,300,000 in add-ons.)	
1 September 2025	ST	(Democratic Republic of the Congo) Yoane Wissa	(England) Brentford	£50,000,000 (Note: A further £5,000,000 in add-ons.)	
Academy
1 July 2025 (Note: The transfer was announced on 5 June, but would become official on July 1 once his Málaga contract expired.)	LW	(Spain) Antonio Cordero	(Spain) Málaga	Free	
24 July 2025	LW	(South Korea) Park Seung-soo	(South Korea) Suwon Samsung Bluewings	Undisclosed	
28 July 2025	LB	(Scotland) Oliver Goodbrand	(Scotland) Rangers	Undisclosed	
28 July 2025	RW	(Scotland) Alfie Hutchinson	(Scotland) Rangers	Undisclosed	
11 August 2025	CB	(England) Isaac Moran	(England) Liverpool	Undisclosed	
30 August 2025 (Note: The transfer was announced on 29 October 2024, but would become official on 30 August 2025, which would be on his 18th birthday.)	ST	(Georgia (country)) Vakhtang Salia	(Georgia (country)) Dinamo Tbilisi	Undisclosed	

=== Transfers out ===
Date	Position	Player	To	Fee	Ref.
First team
30 June 2025 (Note: The transfer was announced on 6 June, but would become official on June 30 once the initial loan ends.)	CB	(England) Lloyd Kelly	(Italy) Juventus	£15,000,000	
18 July 2025	CM	(England) Sean Longstaff	(England) Leeds United	£12,000,000 (Note: A further £3,000,000 in add-ons.)	
7 August 2025	GK	(Slovakia) Martin Dúbravka	(England) Burnley	Undisclosed	
1 September 2025	ST	(Sweden) Alexander Isak	(England) Liverpool	£125,000,000	
3 February 2026	CB	(England) Jamaal Lascelles	(England) Leicester City	Free	
Academy
29 August 2025	LW	(Australia) Garang Kuol	(Czech Republic) Sparta Prague	Undisclosed	
10 January 2026	ST	(England) Ben Parkinson	(Scotland) Falkirk	Undisclosed	
15 January 2026	CB	(Republic of Ireland) Cathal Heffernan	(England) Harrogate Town	Undisclosed	

=== Loans in ===
Date from	Position	Player	From	Date until	Ref.
First team
2 August 2025	GK	(England) Aaron Ramsdale	(England) Southampton	End of Season	
Academy

=== Loans out ===
Date from	Position	Player	To	Date until	Ref.
First team
29 July 2025	AM	(England) Joe White	(England) Leyton Orient	5 January 2026 (Note: On 5 January 2026, White was recalled from his loan at Leyton Orient.)	
12 August 2025	GK	(Greece) Odysseas Vlachodimos	(Spain) Sevilla	End of Season	
26 August 2025	LB	(England) Matt Targett	(England) Middlesbrough	End of Season	
13 January 2026	RB	(Scotland) Harrison Ashby	(England) Bradford City	End of Season	
13 January 2026	AM	(England) Joe White	(England) Bradford City	End of Season	
Academy
1 August 2025	LW	(Spain) Antonio Cordero	(Belgium) Westerlo	31 December 2025 (Note: On 31 December 2025, Cordero was recalled from his loan at Westerlo and subsequently joined Cádiz on loan.)	
10 August 2025	GK	(England) Aidan Harris	(Northern Ireland) Coleraine	1 January 2026	
22 August 2025	GK	(England) Tyler Jones	(England) Ashington	15 November 2025	
1 September 2025	LW	(England) Trevan Sanusi	(France) Lorient	End of Season	
2 September 2025	CM	(Norway) Travis Hernes	(Netherlands) Groningen	End of Season	
31 December 2025	LW	(Spain) Antonio Cordero	(Spain) Cádiz	End of Season	
1 January 2026	ST	(England) Joe Brayson	(England) Morpeth Town	29 January 2026	
23 January 2026	CB	(Scotland) Charlie McArthur	(Scotland) Airdrieonians	End of Season	
26 January 2026	GK	(England) Max Thompson	(Scotland) Ayr United	End of Season	

=== Released / Out of Contract ===
Date	Position	Player	Subsequent club	Join date	Ref.
First team
30 June 2025	ST	(England) Callum Wilson	(England) West Ham United	2 August 2025	
30 June 2025	LB	(Northern Ireland) Jamal Lewis	(England) Preston North End	31 October 2025	
2 August 2025	CM	(Jamaica) Isaac Hayden	(England) Queens Park Rangers	25 August 2025	
Academy
30 June 2025	ST	(England) Josh Donaldson	(England) Hartlepool United	29 July 2025	
30 June 2025	CB	(England) Harry Powell	(England) Ashington	30 July 2025	
30 June 2025	RB	(England) Rory Powell	(England) Ashington	30 July 2025	
30 June 2025	CM	(England) Ellis Stanton	(England) Darlington	8 August 2025	
30 June 2025	AM	(England) Jay Turner-Cooke	(England) FC Halifax Town	19 August 2025	
30 June 2025	CM	(England) James Huntley	(England) Morpeth Town	2 December 2025	

=== New contracts ===
Date	Position	Player	Contracted until	Ref.
First team
12 January 2026	CB	(Netherlands) Sven Botman	30 June 2030	
Academy
17 June 2025	CF	(England) Joe Brayson	Undisclosed (Note: First professional contract)	
17 June 2025	CB	(England) Luke Craggs	Undisclosed	
17 June 2025	CF	(England) Sean Neave	Undisclosed	
17 June 2025	LW	(England) Trevan Sanusi	Undisclosed	
17 June 2025	RB	(England) Leo Shahar	Undisclosed	
17 June 2025	CB	(England) Logan Watts	Undisclosed	
2 August 2025	CB	(England) Aaron Epia	Undisclosed	
2 August 2025	LW	(England) Matheos Ferreira	Undisclosed	
17 November 2025	LW	(England) Sam Pinnington	Undisclosed	
18 February 2026	LB	(Scotland) Oliver Goodbrand	Undisclosed	
18 February 2026	RW	(Scotland) Alfie Hutchison	Undisclosed	
18 February 2026	LW	(England) Michael Mills	Undisclosed	

== Pre-season and friendlies ==
As part of pre-season, Newcastle United announced they would head to Scotland to face Scottish Premiership champions Celtic, and to Singapore to face fellow Premier League side Arsenal as part of the Singapore's Festival of Football Tournament. Also confirmed was a first-ever visit to South Korea, to take part in the prestigious Coupang Play Series 2025, against K League XI and Tottenham Hotspur. On 2 June, it was announced that St James' Park would host the 2025 Sela Cup against Atlético Madrid. A second home friendly was later confirmed, against Espanyol.

Win Draw Loss Fixtures

12 July 2025 Friendly	Newcastle United	4–0	Carlisle United	Newcastle upon Tyne
13:30 BST	Longstaff 25'; Joelinton 65'; J. Murphy 75'; Parkinson 85'	Report		Stadium: Darsley Park; Attendance: 0 (behind-closed-doors)

19 July 2025 Friendly	Celtic	4–0	Newcastle United	Glasgow, Scotland
15:00 BST	Engels 28' (pen.); Trusty (yellow card) 34'; Kenny 45'; Yang Hyun-jun 52'; Scales 75'	Report	Burn (yellow card) 68'	Stadium: Celtic Park; Attendance: 55,000; Referee: Nick Walsh (Scotland)

27 July 2025 Festival of Football Tournament	Arsenal	3–2	Newcastle United	Kallang, Singapore
19:30 SGT	Merino 33'; A. Murphy 35' (o.g.); Zubimendi (yellow card) 38'; Ødegaard 84' (pen.)	Report	Elanga 6'; Lascelles (yellow card) 45+1'; J. Murphy 58'	Stadium: Singapore National Stadium; Attendance: 38,720; Referee: Clarence Leow (Singapore)

30 July 2025 Coupang Play Series	K League XI	1–0	Newcastle United	Suwon, South Korea
20:00 KST	Kim Jin-kyu 36'	Report		Stadium: Suwon World Cup Stadium; Referee: Kim Sang-woo (South Korea)

3 August 2025 Coupang Play Series	Tottenham Hotspur	1–1	Newcastle United	Seoul, South Korea
20:00 KST	Johnson 4'; Bissouma (yellow card) 69'; Richarlison (yellow card) 79'	Report	Trippier (yellow card) 31'; Barnes 38'	Stadium: Seoul World Cup Stadium; Attendance: 64,773; Referee: Kim Jong-hyeok (South Korea)

8 August 2025 Friendly	Newcastle United	2–2	Espanyol	Newcastle upon Tyne
19:30 BST	Targett 21'; Murphy 77'	Report	Expósito 17'; Puado (penalty missed) 39'; Sánchez (yellow card) 39'; Kike 89'	Stadium: St James' Park; Referee: Michael Oliver (England)

9 August 2025 Sela Cup	Newcastle United	0–2	Atlético Madrid	Newcastle upon Tyne
16:00 BST		Report	Hancko (yellow card) 33'; Alvarez 50'; Griezmann 63'; Seidu (yellow card) 78'	Stadium: St James' Park; Referee: Jarred Gillett (England)

== Competitions ==
=== Overall record ===
Competition	First match	Last match	Starting round	Final position	Record							
Competition	First match	Last match	Starting round	Final position	Pld	W	D	L	GF	GA	GD	Win %
Premier League	16 August 2025	24 May 2026	Matchday 1	12th	38	14	7	17	53	55	−2	36.84
FA Cup	10 January 2026	7 March 2026	Third round	Fifth round	3	1	1	1	7	7	+0	33.33
EFL Cup	24 September 2025	4 February 2026	Third round	Semi-finals	5	3	0	2	9	7	+2	60.00
UEFA Champions League	18 September 2025	18 March 2026	League phase	Round of 16	12	6	3	3	29	18	+11	50.00
Total					58	24	11	23	98	87	+11	41.38

Source: Soccerway

=== Premier League ===
==== League table ====
Pos	Team	Pld	W	D	L	GF	GA	GD	Pts
10	Chelsea	38	14	10	14	58	52	+6	52
11	Fulham	38	15	7	16	47	51	−4	52
12	Newcastle United	38	14	7	17	53	55	−2	49
13	Everton	38	13	10	15	47	50	−3	49
14	Leeds United	38	11	14	13	49	56	−7	47

Source: Premier League
Rules for classification: 1) Points; 2) Goal difference; 3) Goals scored; 4) If the champions, relegated teams or qualified teams for UEFA competitions cannot be determined by rules 1 to 3, rules 4.1 to 4.3 are applied – 4.1) Points gained in head-to-head record between such teams; 4.2) Away goals scored in head-to-head record between such teams; 4.3) Play-offs

==== Results summary ====
Overall								Home						Away					
Pld	W	D	L	GF	GA	GD	Pts	W	D	L	GF	GA	GD	W	D	L	GF	GA	GD
38	14	7	17	53	55	−2	49	10	2	7	36	30	+6	4	5	10	17	25	−8

Source: Soccerway

==== Results by round ====
Round	1	2	3	4	5	6	7	8	9	10	11	12	13	14	15	16	17	18	19	20	21	22	23	24	25	26	27	28	29	30	31	32	33	34	35	36	37	38
Ground	A	H	A	H	A	H	H	A	H	A	A	H	A	H	H	A	H	A	A	H	H	A	H	A	H	A	A	H	H	A	H	A	H	A	H	A	H	A
Result	D	L	D	W	D	L	W	L	W	L	L	W	W	D	W	L	D	L	W	W	W	D	L	L	L	W	L	L	W	W	L	L	L	L	W	D	W	L
Position	13	15	17	10	13	15	11	14	12	13	14	14	13	12	12	12	11	14	13	9	5	8	9	11	12	10	11	13	12	9	12	14	14	14	13	13	11	12
Points	1	1	2	5	6	6	9	9	12	12	12	15	18	19	22	22	23	23	26	29	32	33	33	33	33	36	36	36	39	42	42	42	42	42	45	46	49	49

Source: Soccerway
A = Away; H = Home; W = Win; D = Draw; L = Loss; P = Postponed

==== Matches ====
On 18 June 2025, the Premier League fixtures were released, with Newcastle away to Aston Villa on the opening weekend.

Win Draw Loss Fixtures

16 August 2025 1	Aston Villa	0–0	Newcastle United	Birmingham
12:30 BST	Kamara (yellow card) 58'; Konsa (red card) 66'	Report	Joelinton (yellow card) 45'	Stadium: Villa Park; Attendance: 42,526; Referee: Craig Pawson

25 August 2025 2	Newcastle United	2–3	Liverpool	Newcastle
20:00 BST	Burn (yellow card) 44'; Gordon (red card) 45+3'; Bruno Guimarães (yellow card) 47', (goal) 57'; Osula 88'	Report	Gravenberch (yellow card) 8', (goal) 35'; Konaté (yellow card) 25'; Ekitike 46'; Bradley (yellow card) 87'; Ngumoha 90+10'	Stadium: St James' Park; Attendance: 52,230; Referee: Simon Hooper
Note: Fixture was originally scheduled for 23 August, but was rescheduled due to live Sky Sports broadcasting.

30 August 2025 3	Leeds United	0–0	Newcastle United	Leeds
17:30 BST	Gnonto (yellow card) 40'	Report	Pope (yellow card) 36'	Stadium: Elland Road; Attendance: 36,727; Referee: Peter Bankes
Note: Fixture was originally scheduled for a 15:00 kick-off, but was moved due to live Sky Sports broadcasting.

13 September 2025 4	Newcastle United	1–0	Wolverhampton Wanderers	Newcastle upon Tyne
15:00 BST	Woltemade 29'; Bruno Guimarães (yellow card) 88'	Report	Krejčí (yellow card) 7'; André (yellow card) 31'; Munetsi (yellow card) 67'; João Gomes (yellow card) 68'	Stadium: St James' Park; Attendance: 52,145; Referee: Chris Kavanagh

21 September 2025 5	Bournemouth	0–0	Newcastle United	Bournemouth
14:00 BST	Jiménez (yellow card) 45+3'; Diakité (yellow card) 74'	Report	Thiaw (yellow card) 77'	Stadium: Dean Court; Attendance: 11,212; Referee: Robert Jones
Note: Fixture was originally scheduled for 20 September, but was moved due to Newcastle's UEFA Champions League involvement on the preceding Thursday.

28 September 2025 6	Newcastle United	1–2	Arsenal	Newcastle upon Tyne
16:30 BST	Woltemade 34'; Joelinton (yellow card) 83'; Burn (yellow card) 88'	Report	Calafiori (yellow card) 56'; Merino 84'; Gabriel 90+6'	Stadium: St James' Park; Attendance: 52,199; Referee: Jarred Gillett
Note: Fixture was originally scheduled for 27 September, but was moved due to live Sky Sports broadcasting.

5 October 2025 7	Newcastle United	2–0	Nottingham Forest	Newcastle upon Tyne
14:00 BST	Bruno Guimarães 58'; Woltemade 84' (pen.)	Report	Yates (yellow card) 32'; Williams (yellow card) 34'; Morato (yellow card) 68'; Anderson (yellow card) 83'	Stadium: St James' Park; Attendance: 52,189; Referee: Peter Bankes
Note: Fixture was initially scheduled for 4 October, but was rescheduled for live Sky Sports broadcasting.

18 October 2025 8	Brighton & Hove Albion	2–1	Newcastle United	Brighton and Hove
15:00 BST	Welbeck 41', 84'	Report	Woltemade 76'; Burn (yellow card) 90+7'	Stadium: Falmer Stadium; Attendance: 31,620; Referee: Craig Pawson

25 October 2025 9	Newcastle United	2–1	Fulham	Newcastle upon Tyne
15:00 BST	J. Murphy 18'; Bruno Guimarães 90'	Report	Tete (yellow card) 3'; Lukić 56'; Iwobi (yellow card) 66'	Stadium: St James' Park; Attendance: 52,152; Referee: Peter Bankes

2 November 2025 10	West Ham United	3–1	Newcastle United	Stratford
14:00 GMT	Paquetá 35', (yellow card) 90+6'; Botman 45+5' (o.g.); Souček 90+7'	Report	J. Murphy 4'; Bruno Guimarães (yellow card) 30'; Ramsey (yellow card) 90+6'	Stadium: London Stadium; Attendance: 62,441; Referee: Robert Jones
Note: Fixture was initially scheduled for 1 November, but was rescheduled due to live Sky Sports broadcasting.

9 November 2025 11	Brentford	3–1	Newcastle United	Brentford
14:00 GMT	Schade 56'; Ouattara (yellow card) 61'; Thiago 78' (pen.), 90+5'; Kayode (yellow card) 87'	Report	Barnes 27'; Burn (yellow card) 49' (yellow-red card) 73'; Trippier (yellow card) 90+7'	Stadium: Brentford Community Stadium; Attendance: 17,207; Referee: Stuart Attwell
Note: Fixture was initially scheduled for 8 November, but was rescheduled due to live Sky Sports broadcasting.

22 November 2025 12	Newcastle United	2–1	Manchester City	Newcastle upon Tyne
17:30 GMT	Barnes 63', 70'; Joelinton (yellow card) 90+4'	Report	Dias 68'; Donnarumma (yellow card) 70'; Bobb (yellow card) 90+2'; Silva (yellow card) 90+9'	Stadium: St James' Park; Attendance: 52,181; Referee: Sam Barrott
Note: Fixture was originally scheduled for a 15:00 kick-off, but was moved due to live Sky Sports broadcasting.

29 November 2025 13	Everton	1–4	Newcastle United	Liverpool
17:30 GMT	Dewsbury-Hall 69'	Report	Thiaw 1', 58'; Miley 25'; Woltemade 45'	Stadium: Hill Dickinson Stadium; Attendance: 52,244; Referee: Craig Pawson
Note: Fixture was originally scheduled for a 15:00 kick-off, but was moved due to live Sky Sports broadcasting.

2 December 2025 14	Newcastle United	2–2	Tottenham Hotspur	Newcastle upon Tyne
20:15 GMT	Bruno Guimarães 71'; Gordon 86' (pen.)	Report	Romero (yellow card) 23', (goal) 78', 90+5'; Bentancur (yellow card) 56'; Richarlison (yellow card) 86'	Stadium: St James' Park; Attendance: 52,007; Referee: Thomas Bramall
Note: Fixture was initially scheduled for 3 December, but was rescheduled due to live Sky Sports broadcasting.

6 December 2025 15	Newcastle United	2–1	Burnley	Newcastle upon Tyne
15:00 GMT	Bruno Guimarães 31'; Gordon 45+8' (pen.); Livramento (yellow card) 52'; Ramsey (yellow card) 90+3'	Report	Walker (yellow card) 35'; Lucas Pires (red card) 43'; Laurent (yellow card) 89'; Flemming 90+4' (pen.)	Stadium: St James' Park; Attendance: 52,041; Referee: Stuart Attwell

14 December 2025 16	Sunderland	1–0	Newcastle United	Sunderland
14:00 GMT	Brobbey (yellow card) 27'; Mukiele (yellow card) 34'; Woltemade 46' (o.g.); Mandava (yellow card) 58'; Le Fée (yellow card) 86'; Isidor (yellow card) 90+4'	Report	Tonali (yellow card) 57'; Bruno Guimarães (yellow card) 90+4'; Willock (yellow card) 90+4'; Thiaw (yellow card) 90+5'	Stadium: Stadium of Light; Attendance: 47,158; Referee: Peter Bankes
Note: Fixture was initially scheduled for 13 December, but was rescheduled due to live Sky Sports broadcasting.

20 December 2025 17	Newcastle United	2–2	Chelsea	Newcastle upon Tyne
12:30 GMT	Woltemade 4', 20'; Schär (yellow card) 61'; Wissa (yellow card) 77'; Hall (yellow card) 86'	Report	Sánchez (yellow card) 7'; Garnacho (yellow card) 27'; Gusto (yellow card) 45'; James 49'; João Pedro 66', (yellow card) 83'; Caicedo (yellow card) 70'; Andrey Santos (yellow card) 82'	Stadium: St James' Park; Attendance: 52,226; Referee: Andrew Madley
Note: Fixture was originally scheduled for a 15:00 kick-off, but was moved for live TNT Sports broadcasting.

26 December 2025 18	Manchester United	1–0	Newcastle United	Old Trafford
20:00 GMT	Dorgu 24'; Shaw (yellow card) 69'; Cunha (yellow card) 90+2'	Report	Tonali (yellow card) 73'	Stadium: Old Trafford; Attendance: 73,996; Referee: Anthony Taylor
Note: Fixture was originally scheduled for 27 December, but was rescheduled for live Sky Sports broadcasting.

30 December 2025 19	Burnley	1–3	Newcastle United	Burnley
19:30 GMT	Laurent 23'; Walker (yellow card) 28'; Florentino (yellow card) 32'	Report	Joelinton 2', (yellow card) 28'; Wissa 7'; Bruno Guimarães 90+3'	Stadium: Turf Moor; Attendance: 21,020; Referee: Robert Jones
Note: Fixture was originally scheduled for a 20:00 kick-off, but was moved for live Sky Sports broadcasting.

4 January 2026 20	Newcastle United	2–0	Crystal Palace	Newcastle upon Tyne
15:00 GMT	Gordon (yellow card) 62'; Bruno Guimarães 71'; Thiaw 78'	Report	Johnson (yellow card) 33'; Mitchell (yellow card) 49'; Guéhi (yellow card) 55'	Stadium: St James' Park; Attendance: 51,979; Referee: John Brooks
Note: Fixture was originally scheduled for 3 January, but was rescheduled for live Sky Sports broadcasting.

7 January 2026 21	Newcastle United	4–3	Leeds United	Newcastle upon Tyne
20:15 GMT	Thiaw (yellow card) 7'; Barnes 36', 90+12'; Gordon (yellow card) 45+3'; Joelinton (yellow card) 45+6', (goal) 54'; Bruno Guimarães 90+1' (pen.)	Report	Calvert-Lewin (yellow card) 22', (goal) 45+5' (pen.); Aaronson 32', 79'; Ampadu (yellow card) 90+10'	Stadium: St James' Park; Attendance: 52,176; Referee: Michael Salisbury
Note: Fixture was originally scheduled for a 20:00 kick-off, but was moved for live Sky Sports broadcasting.

18 January 2026 22	Wolverhampton Wanderers	0–0	Newcastle United	Wolverhampton
14:00 GMT	Mosquera (yellow card) 78'; André (yellow card) 90+5'	Report	Tonali (yellow card) 58'; Botman (yellow card) 89'	Stadium: Molineux Stadium; Attendance: 29,751; Referee: Sam Barrott
Note: Fixture was originally scheduled for 17 January, but was moved for live Sky Sports broadcasting.

25 January 2026 23	Newcastle United	0–2	Aston Villa	Newcastle upon Tyne
14:00 GMT	Joelinton (yellow card) 27'	Report	Buendía 19'; Digne (yellow card) 79'; Watkins 88'; Maatsen (yellow card) 90+2'	Stadium: St James' Park; Attendance: 52,134; Referee: Jarred Gillett
Note: Fixture was originally scheduled for 24 January, but was rescheduled due to Aston Villa's UEFA Europa League involvement on the preceding Thursday.

31 January 2026 24	Liverpool	4–1	Newcastle United	Liverpool
20:00 GMT	Ekitike 41', 43'; Mac Allister (yellow card) 59'; Wirtz 67'; Konaté 90+3'	Report	Gordon (yellow card) 11', (goal) 36'; Ramsey (yellow card) 45+3'; Burn (yellow card) 86'	Stadium: Anfield; Attendance: 60,416; Referee: Simon Hooper
Note: Fixture was originally scheduled a 15:00 kick-off, but was rescheduled for live TNT Sports broadcasting.

7 February 2026 25	Newcastle United	2–3	Brentford	Newcastle upon Tyne
17:30 GMT	Botman 24'; J. Murphy (yellow card) 44'; Bruno Guimarães 79' (pen.); Hall (yellow card) 90+6'	Report	Janelt 37', (yellow card) 90+1'; Thiago 45+2' (pen.), (yellow card) 69'; Ouattara 85'	Stadium: St James' Park; Attendance: 52,032; Referee: Andrew Madley
Note: Fixture was initially scheduled for a 15:00 kick-off, but was rescheduled for live Sky Sports broadcasting.

10 February 2026 26	Tottenham Hotspur	1–2	Newcastle United	Tottenham
19:30 GMT	Sarr (yellow card) 41'; Spence (yellow card) 62'; Gray 64'; Simons (yellow card) 67'	Report	Thiaw 45+5'; Burn (yellow card) 59'; Ramsey 68'; Bruno Guimarães (yellow card) 89'	Stadium: Tottenham Hotspur Stadium; Attendance: 59,773; Referee: Anthony Taylor
Note: Fixture was initially scheduled for 11 February, but was rescheduled for live TNT Sports broadcasting.

21 February 2026 27	Manchester City	2–1	Newcastle United	Manchester
20:00 GMT	O'Reilly 14', 27'; Dias (yellow card) 41'; Silva (yellow card) 50'	Report	Burn (yellow card) 9'; Hall 22'; Willock (yellow card) 48'; Barnes (yellow card) 62'; Trippier (yellow card) 65'; Joelinton (yellow card) 89'	Stadium: City of Manchester Stadium; Attendance: 52,187; Referee: Thomas Bramall
Note: Fixture was initially scheduled for a 15:00 kick-off, but was rescheduled for live TNT Sports broadcasting.

28 February 2026 28	Newcastle United	2–3	Everton	Newcastle upon Tyne
15:00 GMT	Ramsey 32'; Willock (yellow card) 61'; J. Murphy 82'; Burn (yellow card) 88'; Hall (yellow card) 90+5'	Report	Branthwaite 19'; Beto 34'; Dewsbury-Hall (yellow card) 53'; Garner (yellow card) 67'; Barry 83', (yellow card) 90+5'	Stadium: St James' Park; Attendance: 52,514; Referee: Stuart Attwell

4 March 2026 29	Newcastle United	2–1	Manchester United	Newcastle upon Tyne
20:15 GMT	Ramsey (yellow card) 26' (yellow-red card) 45+1'; Joelinton (yellow card) 38'; Gordon 45+6' (pen.); Trippier (yellow card) 80'; Osula 90'	Report	Mbeumo (yellow card) 37'; Shaw (yellow card) 39'; Casemiro 45+9'; Mazraoui (yellow card) 64'	Stadium: St James' Park; Attendance: 52,184; Referee: Peter Bankes
Note: Fixture was initially scheduled for a 20:00 kick-off, but was rescheduled for live TNT Sports broadcasting.

14 March 2026 30	Chelsea	0–1	Newcastle United	Fulham
17:30 GMT	Fofana (yellow card) 23'; Caicedo (yellow card) 25'	Report	Gordon 18'; Ramsdale (yellow card) 84'; Hall (yellow card) 89'	Stadium: Stamford Bridge; Attendance: 39,587; Referee: Paul Tierney
Note: Fixture was initially scheduled for a 15:00 kick-off, but was rescheduled for live Sky Sports broadcasting.

22 March 2026 31	Newcastle United	1–2	Sunderland	Newcastle upon Tyne
12:00 GMT	Gordon 10'; Joelinton (yellow card) 90+1'	Report	Hume (yellow card) 44'; Talbi 57'; Alderte (yellow card) 82'; Brobbey 90', (yellow card) 90+1'; Sadiki (yellow card) 90+4'; Geertruida (yellow card) 90+4'; Mandava (yellow card) 90+9'	Stadium: St James' Park; Attendance: 52,253; Referee: Anthony Taylor
Note: Fixture was initially scheduled for 21 March, but was rescheduled for live Sky Sports broadcasting.

12 April 2026 32	Crystal Palace	2–1	Newcastle United	Selhurst
14:00 BST	Mateta 80', 90+4' (pen.)	Report	Osula 43'; Thiaw (yellow card) 68'; Joelinton (yellow card) 74'; Ramsdale (yellow card) 90+3'	Stadium: Selhurst Park; Attendance: 25,141; Referee: Andrew Madley
Note: Fixture was initially scheduled for 11 April at 15:00, but was pushed back due to Crystal Palace’s in the UEFA Conference League involvement on the preceding Thursday.

18 April 2026 33	Newcastle United	1–2	Bournemouth	Newcastle upon Tyne
15:00 BST	Osula 68'; Botman (yellow card) 77'; J. Murphy (yellow card) 80'	Report	Tavernier 32', (yellow card) 55'; Christie (yellow card) 52'; Scott (yellow card) 82'; Truffert 85'; Petrović (yellow card) 90+4'	Stadium: St James' Park; Attendance: 52,109; Referee: Thomas Bramall

25 April 2026 34	Arsenal	1–0	Newcastle United	Holloway
17:30 BST	Eze 9'; Martinelli (yellow card) 71'; Rice (yellow card) 86'	Report	Burn (yellow card) 57'; Pope (yellow card) 74'	Stadium: Emirates Stadium; Attendance: 60,204; Referee: Sam Barrott
Note: Fixture was initially scheduled for a 15:00 kick-off, but was pushed back for live Sky Sports broadcasting.

2 May 2026 35	Newcastle United	3–1	Brighton & Hove Albion	Newcastle upon Tyne
15:00 BST	Osula 12'; Burn 24', (yellow card) 53'; Tonali (yellow card) 85'; Wissa (yellow card) 87'; Barnes 90+5'	Report	Veltman (yellow card) 22'; Mitoma (yellow card) 39'; Hinshelwood 61'; Van Hecke (yellow card) 90+2'	Stadium: St James' Park; Attendance: 52,099; Referee: Chris Kavanagh

9 May 2026 36	Nottingham Forest	1–1	Newcastle United	West Bridgford
15:00 BST	Igor Jesus (yellow card) 49'; Yates (yellow card) 54'; Anderson 88'	Report	Barnes 74'	Stadium: City Ground; Attendance: 30,691; Referee: Paul Tierney

17 May 2026 37	Newcastle United	3–1	West Ham United	Newcastle upon Tyne
15:00 BST	Woltemade 15'; Osula 19', 65'; Hall (yellow card) 83'	Report	Souček (yellow card) 59'; Diouf (yellow card) 67'; Castellanos 69'; Kanté (yellow card) 80'	Stadium: St James' Park; Attendance: 52,206; Referee: Jarred Gillett

24 May 2026 38	Fulham	2–0	Newcastle United	Fulham
16:00 BST	Diop 20'; Cairney 80'; Robinson (yellow card) 89'; Cuenca (yellow card) 90+8'	Report	Bruno Guimarães (yellow card) 64'; Wissa (yellow card) 70'	Stadium: Craven Cottage; Attendance: 27,442; Referee: Robert Jones

=== FA Cup ===
As a Premier League club, Newcastle entered the FA Cup in the third round, and were drawn at home to Bournemouth. They were then drawn away to Aston Villa in the fourth round, and at home to Manchester City in the fifth round.

Win Draw Loss Fixtures

10 January 2026 Third round	Newcastle United	3–3 (a.e.t.) (7–6 p)	Bournemouth	Newcastle upon Tyne
15:00 GMT	Barnes 50', 118'; Bruno Guimarães (yellow card) 90+3'; Gordon 90+5' (pen.)	Report	Scott 62', (yellow card) 81'; Brooks 68'; Soler (yellow card) 76'; Tavernier (yellow card) 86', (goal) 120+2'; Petrović (yellow card) 90+3'; Cook (yellow card) 95'	Stadium: St James' Park; Attendance: 51,563; Referee: Thomas Bramall
	Penalties
	Gordon (penalty scored); Woltemade (penalty missed); Bruno Guimarães (penalty missed); Tonali (penalty scored); Joelinton (penalty scored); Hall (penalty scored); Miley (penalty scored); Barnes (penalty scored); Thiaw (penalty scored)		(penalty scored) Tavernier; (penalty missed) Evanilson; (penalty scored) Cook; (penalty missed) Jiménez; (penalty scored) Senesi; (penalty scored) Hill; (penalty scored) Truffert; (penalty scored) Smith; (penalty missed) Diakité

14 February 2026 Fourth round	Aston Villa	1–3	Newcastle United	Birmingham
17:45 GMT	Douglas Luiz (yellow card) 4'; Abraham 14'; Digne (yellow card) 42'; Bizot (red card) 45+1'	Report	Thiaw (yellow card) 25'; Barnes (yellow card) 52'; Ramsey (yellow card) 55'; Tonali 63', 76'; Woltemade 88'	Stadium: Villa Park; Attendance: 42,101; Referee: Chris Kavanagh

7 March 2026 Fifth round	Newcastle United	1–3	Manchester City	Newcastle upon Tyne
20:00 GMT	Barnes 18'; Joelinton (yellow card) 78'; Wissa (yellow card) 90'	Report	Savinho 39'; Marmoush 47', 65'	Stadium: St James' Park; Attendance: 51,109; Referee: Sam Barrott

=== EFL Cup ===
As a Premier League club involved in European competition, Newcastle entered the EFL Cup in the third round, and were drawn at home to Bradford City. They were then drawn at home to Tottenham Hotspur in the fourth round, and at home to Fulham in the quarter-finals. A two-legged tie against Manchester City was drawn for the semi-finals, with the first leg at home and second leg away.

Win Draw Loss Fixtures

24 September 2025 Third round	Newcastle United	4–1	Bradford City	Newcastle upon Tyne
19:45 BST	Joelinton 17', 75'; Osula 19', 87'	Report	Leigh (yellow card) 41'; Cook 79'	Stadium: St James' Park; Attendance: 51,249; Referee: Thomas Kirk

29 October 2025 Fourth round	Newcastle United	2–0	Tottenham Hotspur	Newcastle upon Tyne
20:00 GMT	Schär 24', (yellow card) 57'; Thiaw (yellow card) 45+1'; Woltemade 50'; Trippier (yellow card) 81'; Joelinton (yellow card) 86'	Report	Richarlison (yellow card) 25'; Palhinha (yellow card) 33'; Kudus (yellow card) 86'	Stadium: St James' Park; Attendance: 51,216; Referee: Chris Kavanagh

17 December 2025 Quarter-finals	Newcastle United	2–1	Fulham	Newcastle upon Tyne
20:15 GMT	Wissa 10'; Schär (yellow card) 23'; Woltemade (yellow card) 82'; Miley 90+2'	Report	Lukić 16', (yellow card) 29'	Stadium: St James' Park; Attendance: 51,301; Referee: Darren England

13 January 2026 Semi-finals first leg	Newcastle United	0–2	Manchester City	Newcastle upon Tyne
20:00 GMT	Joelinton (yellow card) 31'; Bruno Guimarães (yellow card) 76'; Trippier (yellow card) 90'; Tonali (yellow card) 90+2'	Report	O'Reilly (yellow card) 31'; Nunes (yellow card) 37'; Semenyo 53'; Silva (yellow card) 73'; Lewis (yellow card) 83'; Cherki 90+8'	Stadium: St James' Park; Attendance: 51,392; Referee: Chris Kavanagh

4 February 2026 Semi-finals second leg	Manchester City	3–1 (5–1 agg.)	Newcastle United	Manchester
20:00 GMT	Marmoush 7', 29'; Nunes (yellow card) 27'; Reijnders 32'; González (yellow card) 78'; Rodri (yellow card) 90+1'	Report	Elanga 62'	Stadium: City of Manchester Stadium; Attendance: 41,834; Referee: Tony Harrington

=== UEFA Champions League ===
==== League phase ====
Newcastle were drawn against Barcelona, Benfica, Athletic Bilbao and PSV Eindhoven at home, and Union Saint-Gilloise, Marseille, Bayer Leverkusen and Paris Saint-Germain away in the league phase.

Pos	Team	Pld	W	D	L	GF	GA	GD	Pts	Qualification
10	(Italian Football Federation) Inter Milan	8	5	0	3	15	7	+8	15	Advance to knockout phase play-offs (seeded)
11	(French Football Federation) Paris Saint-Germain	8	4	2	2	21	11	+10	14	Advance to knockout phase play-offs (seeded)
12	(The Football Association) Newcastle United	8	4	2	2	17	7	+10	14	Advance to knockout phase play-offs (seeded)
13	(Italian Football Federation) Juventus	8	3	4	1	14	10	+4	13	Advance to knockout phase play-offs (seeded)
14	(Royal Spanish Football Federation) Atlético Madrid	8	4	1	3	17	15	+2	13	Advance to knockout phase play-offs (seeded)

Source: UEFA
Rules for classification: League phase tiebreakers

Round	1	2	3	4	5	6	7	8
Ground	H	A	H	H	A	A	H	A
Result	L	W	W	W	L	D	W	D
Position	26	11	8	6	11	12	7	12
Points	0	3	6	9	9	10	13	14

Source: UEFA
A = Away; H = Home; W = Win; D = Draw; L = Loss

Win Draw Loss Fixtures

18 September 2025 1	Newcastle United (England)	1–2	(Spain) Barcelona	Newcastle upon Tyne, England
20:00 BST	Joelinton (yellow card) 28'; Burn (yellow card) 45+2'; Gordon 90'	Report	Martín (yellow card) 45'; Rashford 58', 67'; López (yellow card) 75'; De Jong (yellow card) 82'; Casadó (yellow card) 90+7'	Stadium: St James' Park; Attendance: 52,084; Referee: Glenn Nyberg (Sweden)

1 October 2025 2	Union Saint-Gilloise (Belgium)	0–4	(England) Newcastle United	Brussels, Belgium
18:45 CEST	Van de Perre (yellow card) 39'; Burgess (yellow card) 51'; Mac Allister (yellow card) 57'; Giger (yellow card) 60'	Report	Woltemade 17'; Joelinton (yellow card) 36'; Gordon 43' (pen.), 64' (pen.); Barnes 80'	Stadium: Constant Vanden Stock Stadium; Attendance: 16,038; Referee: Urs Schnyder (Switzerland)
Note: The match was played at Constant Vanden Stock Stadium in Brussels, instead of Union Saint-Gilloise's regular stadium, Joseph Marien Stadium, which did not meet UEFA requirements.

21 October 2025 3	Newcastle United (England)	3–0	(Portugal) Benfica	Newcastle upon Tyne, England
20:00 BST	Thiaw (yellow card) 17'; Gordon 32'; Barnes 70', 83'	Report	Lukébakio (yellow card) 45'	Stadium: St James' Park; Attendance: 52,073; Referee: Szymon Marciniak (Poland)

5 November 2025 4	Newcastle United (England)	2–0	(Spain) Athletic Bilbao	Newcastle upon Tyne, England
20:00 GMT	Burn 11'; Joelinton 49'	Report	Paredes (yellow card) 57'; Areso (yellow card) 69'	Stadium: St James' Park; Attendance: 51,923; Referee: Ivan Kružliak (Slovakia)

25 November 2025 5	Marseille (France)	2–1	(England) Newcastle United	Marseille, France
21:00 CET	Balerdi (yellow card) 3'; Bakola (yellow card) 36'; Aubameyang 46', 50'; Emerson (yellow card) 52'; Greenwood (yellow card) 67'; Vermeeren (yellow card) 84'	Report	Barnes 6'; Willock (yellow card) 20'; Gordon (yellow card) 42'; Burn (yellow card) 65'	Stadium: Stade Vélodrome; Attendance: 64,521; Referee: Maurizio Mariani (Italy)

10 December 2025 6	Bayer Leverkusen (Germany)	2–2	(England) Newcastle United	Leverkusen, Germany
21:00 CET	Bruno Guimarães 13' (o.g.); Poku (yellow card) 47'; García (yellow card) 50'; Grimaldo 88'	Report	Thiaw (yellow card) 21'; Gordon 51' (pen.); Miley 74'; Ramsdale (yellow card) 82'	Stadium: BayArena; Attendance: 30,210; Referee: Serdar Gözübüyük (Netherlands)

21 January 2026 7	Newcastle United (England)	3–0	(Netherlands) PSV Eindhoven	Newcastle upon Tyne, England
20:00 GMT	Wissa 8'; Bruno Guimarães (yellow card) 26'; Gordon 30'; Tonali (yellow card) 54'; Barnes 65'	Report	Sildillia (yellow card) 34'; Gasiorowski (yellow card) 62'; Veerman (yellow card) 90+1'; Obispo (yellow card) 90+2'	Stadium: St James' Park; Attendance: 52,076; Referee: Daniel Siebert (Germany)

28 January 2026 8	Paris Saint-Germain (France)	1–1	(England) Newcastle United	Paris, France
21:00 CET	Dembélé (penalty missed) 4'; Vitinha 8'	Report	Elanga (yellow card) 20'; Willock 45+2'	Stadium: Parc des Princes; Attendance: 47,637; Referee: Slavko Vinčić (Slovenia)

==== Knockout phase ====
===== Knockout phase play-offs =====
Newcastle were drawn against Qarabağ in the knockout phase play-offs, with the first leg away and second leg at home.

18 February 2026 First leg	Qarabağ (Azerbaijan)	1–6	(England) Newcastle United	Baku, Azerbaijan
21:45 AZT	Cafarguliyev 54'	Report	Gordon 3', 32' (pen.), 33', 45+1' (pen.); Thiaw 8', (yellow card) 77'; J. Murphy 72'	Stadium: Tofiq Bahramov Republican Stadium; Attendance: 28,861; Referee: Espen Eskås (Norway)

24 February 2026 Second leg	Newcastle United (England)	3–2 (9–3 agg.)	(Azerbaijan) Qarabağ	Newcastle upon Tyne, England
20:00 GMT	Tonali 4'; Joelinton 6'; Botman 52'	Report	Durán 50'; Janković (penalty missed) 57'; Cafarguliyev 57'; Bicalho (yellow card) 80'	Stadium: St James' Park; Attendance: 50,068; Referee: Davide Massa (Italy)

===== Round of 16 =====
Newcastle were drawn against Barcelona in the round of 16, with the first leg being at home.

10 March 2026 First leg	Newcastle United (England)	1–1	(Spain) Barcelona	Newcastle upon Tyne, England
20:00 GMT	Tonali (yellow card) 34'; Barnes 86'; Willock (yellow card) 90+4'	Report	Cancelo (yellow card) 68'; Yamal 90+6' (pen.)	Stadium: St James' Park; Attendance: 52,103; Referee: Marco Guida (Italy)

18 March 2026 Second leg	Barcelona (Spain)	7–2 (8–3 agg.)	(England) Newcastle United	Barcelona, Spain
18:45 CET	Raphinha 6', 72'; Bernal 18'; Cubarsí (yellow card) 44'; Yamal 45+7' (pen.); López 51'; Lewandowski 56', 61'	Report	Elanga 15', 28'; Joelinton (yellow card) 17'; Trippier (yellow card) 45+5'; Willock (yellow card) 60'	Stadium: Camp Nou; Attendance: 56,662; Referee: François Letexier (France)

== Statistics ==
=== Appearances and goals ===
As of match played 24 May 2026

Players with no appearances are not included on the list, italics indicate a loaned in player

No.	Pos	Nat	Player	Total		Premier League		FA Cup		EFL Cup		Champions League	
No.	Pos	Nat	Player	Apps	Goals	Apps	Goals	Apps	Goals	Apps	Goals	Apps	Goals
1	GK	(England) ENG	Nick Pope	36	0	27	0	0	0	1	0	8	0
2	DF	(England) ENG	Kieran Trippier	37	0	18+3	0	3	0	1+3	0	9	0
3	DF	(England) ENG	Lewis Hall	46	1	24+6	1	2+1	0	3	0	6+4	0
4	DF	(Netherlands) NED	Sven Botman	38	2	21+4	1	2	0	3	0	6+2	1
5	DF	(Switzerland) SUI	Fabian Schär	21	1	11+5	0	0	0	2	1	2+1	0
7	MF	(Brazil) BRA	Joelinton	42	6	23+4	2	0+2	0	2+1	2	8+2	2
8	MF	(Italy) ITA	Sandro Tonali	53	3	31+4	0	3	2	2+2	0	11	1
9	FW	(Democratic Republic of the Congo) COD	Yoane Wissa	28	3	4+15	1	1+1	0	2+1	1	1+3	1
10	MF	(England) ENG	Anthony Gordon	46	17	24+2	6	0+3	1	3+2	0	9+3	10
11	MF	(England) ENG	Harvey Barnes	57	16	19+18	7	3	3	2+3	0	9+3	6
12	DF	(Germany) GER	Malick Thiaw	54	5	33+2	4	3	0	5	0	10+1	1
17	DF	(Sweden) SWE	Emil Krafth	3	0	1+0	0	0	0	2	0	0	0
18	FW	(Denmark) DEN	William Osula	35	9	8+16	7	2	0	1+2	2	2+4	0
20	MF	(Sweden) SWE	Anthony Elanga	49	3	14+18	0	1+1	0	2+3	1	6+4	2
21	DF	(England) ENG	Tino Livramento	26	0	14+3	0	1+1	0	1+1	0	3+2	0
23	MF	(England) ENG	Jacob Murphy	47	4	20+14	3	1	0	2+1	0	3+6	1
27	FW	(Germany) GER	Nick Woltemade	51	11	24+9	8	3	1	2+3	1	7+3	1
28	MF	(England) ENG	Joe Willock	39	1	10+14	0	2+1	0	3	0	3+6	1
32	GK	(England) ENG	Aaron Ramsdale	23	0	11+1	0	3	0	4	0	4	0
33	DF	(England) ENG	Dan Burn	44	2	25+4	1	1+1	0	2	0	11	1
37	DF	(Republic of Ireland) IRL	Alex Murphy	6	0	0+2	0	0+1	0	0+2	0	1	0
39	MF	(Brazil) BRA	Bruno Guimarães	41	9	27+2	9	0+1	0	3+1	0	7	0
41	MF	(England) ENG	Jacob Ramsey	42	2	15+13	2	2	0	4	0	4+4	0
61	DF	(England) ENG	Leo Shahar	1	0	0	0	0	0	0	0	0+1	0
62	FW	(England) ENG	Sean Neave	2	0	0+1	0	0	0	0	0	0+1	0
67	MF	(England) ENG	Lewis Miley	34	3	15+8	1	0+1	0	3	1	2+5	1
Player(s) who left permanently but featured this season
6	DF	(England) ENG	Jamaal Lascelles	2	0	0+2	0	0	0	0	0	0	0

=== Discipline ===
As of match played 24 May 2026

Rank	No.	Pos.	Player	Premier League			FA Cup			EFL Cup			Champions League			Total		
Rank	No.	Pos.	Player	Yellow card	(yellow card) (yellow-red card)	Red card	Yellow card	(yellow card) (yellow-red card)	Red card	Yellow card	(yellow card) (yellow-red card)	Red card	Yellow card	(yellow card) (yellow-red card)	Red card	Yellow card	(yellow card) (yellow-red card)	Red card
1	7	MF	(Brazil) Joelinton	10	0	0	1	0	0	2	0	0	3	0	0	16	0	0
2	33	DF	(England) Dan Burn	9	1	0	0	0	0	0	0	0	2	0	0	11	1	0
3	12	DF	(Germany) Malick Thiaw	4	0	0	1	0	0	1	0	0	3	0	0	9	0	0
3	39	MF	(Brazil) Bruno Guimarães	6	0	0	1	0	0	1	0	0	1	0	0	9	0	0
5	8	MF	(Italy) Sandro Tonali	4	0	0	0	0	0	1	0	0	2	0	0	7	0	0
6	2	DF	(England) Kieran Trippier	3	0	0	0	0	0	2	0	0	1	0	0	6	0	0
6	28	MF	(England) Joe Willock	3	0	0	0	0	0	0	0	0	3	0	0	6	0	0
8	10	FW	(England) Anthony Gordon	3	0	1	0	0	0	0	0	0	1	0	0	4	0	1
9	41	MF	(England) Jacob Ramsey	3	1	0	1	0	0	0	0	0	0	0	0	4	1	0
10	3	DF	(England) Lewis Hall	5	0	0	0	0	0	0	0	0	0	0	0	5	0	0
11	9	FW	(Democratic Republic of the Congo) Yoane Wissa	3	0	0	1	0	0	0	0	0	0	0	0	4	0	0
12	5	DF	(Switzerland) Fabian Schär	1	0	0	0	0	0	2	0	0	0	0	0	3	0	0
12	32	GK	(England) Aaron Ramsdale	2	0	0	0	0	0	0	0	0	1	0	0	3	0	0
14	1	GK	(England) Nick Pope	2	0	0	0	0	0	0	0	0	0	0	0	2	0	0
14	4	DF	(Netherlands) Sven Botman	2	0	0	0	0	0	0	0	0	0	0	0	2	0	0
14	11	FW	(England) Harvey Barnes	1	0	0	1	0	0	0	0	0	0	0	0	2	0	0
14	23	FW	(England) Jacob Murphy	2	0	0	0	0	0	0	0	0	0	0	0	2	0	0
18	20	FW	(Sweden) Anthony Elanga	1	0	0	0	0	0	0	0	0	0	0	0	1	0	0
18	21	DF	(England) Tino Livramento	1	0	0	0	0	0	0	0	0	0	0	0	1	0	0
18	27	FW	(Germany) Nick Woltemade	0	0	0	0	0	0	1	0	0	0	0	0	1	0	0
Totals				65	2	1	6	0	0	10	0	0	17	0	0	98	2	1
