= Newcastle United F.C. Under-21s and Academy =

Newcastle United Reserves and Academy
- Full name: Newcastle United F.C. Reserves and Academy
- Nickname: The Magpies
- Founded: 1892
- Ground: Under-21s: Whitley Park/St James' Park
- Capacity: 1,000/52,305/10,200
- Owner(s): Public Investment Fund (85%); RB Sports & Media (15%)
- Manager: Under-21s: Robbie Stockdale; Under-18s: Chris Moore
- League: Under-21s: Premier League 2 Under-18s: U18 Premier League, North
- 2025–26: Under-21s: 21st Under-18s: 3rd
- Website: www.newcastleunited.com/en
| Home colours | Away colours | Third colours |

Newcastle United F.C. Under-21s and Academy are the reserve and academy teams for the Premier League club Newcastle United.

== Under-21 ==
The Under-21 team plays in the Premier League 2, Division 2. It also participates in the Northumberland Senior Cup each season. Newcastle Under-21 play their home games at Whitley Park, the former home ground of West Allotment Celtic, and also at the first team stadium St James' Park. In previous seasons the team has also played at Gateshead International Stadium, the home ground of Gateshead, and Kingston Park, the home ground of Newcastle Falcons.

=== Honours ===
League Winners

- The Central League (1): 1947–48
- Northern Football League (3): 1902–03, 1903–04, 1904–05
- North Eastern League (6): 1906–07, 1907–08, 1908–09, 1910–11, 1922–23, 1925–26
- Northern Football Alliance (5): 1897–98, 1900–01, 1901–02, 1938–39, 1957–58

Cups Winners

- Northumberland Senior Cup (33): 1884–85 and 1888–89 (Newcastle East End), 1887–88 and 1891–92 (Newcastle West End), 1898–98, 1900–01, 1903–04, 1904–05, 1906–06, 1908–09, 1909–10, 1910–11, 1911–12 (joint), 1921–22, 1924–25, 1925–26, 1926–27, 1928–29, 1929–30, 1930–31, 1988–89, 1989–90, 1994–95, 1995–96, 1998–99, 1999–00, 2000–01, 2002–03, 2005–06, 2007–08, 2008–09, 2010–11, 2011–12, 2013–14, 2017-18, 2023-24
- HKFC Soccer Sevens (3): 2012, 2018, 2019

== Under-18 ==
The Under-18 team plays in the Premier League U18, North and is only for players 18 and below.

Home games are played at the academy base at Little Benton, located to the immediate south of Newcastle United's training ground, Darsley Park. FA Youth Cup home games are usually played at St James' Park.

The objective of Newcastle's academy is to develop players and their football-playing abilities to their potential, so that these players might someday contribute to Newcastle on the pitch. This is made possible by providing training, education and management to the region's players.

=== Honours ===
League Winners

- Premier Academy League U17 (1): 2001–02

Cup Winners

- FA Youth Cup (2): 1961–62, 1984–85
- Milk Cup (2): 1985, 1989
- Foca Tournament Cup (2): 2009, 2010
- Brasileirão: 2010
- Tournoi International de Football U17: 2015
- Neuville Tournament: 2015

== Players ==
=== Under–21 players ===
The players below are in the Under–21 age group for the 2026/27 season; these are players born on or after 1 January 2005 and usually have professional contracts unless stated:

As of 23 Oct 2026

Under–21 players
| Nationality | Squad No | Player | Date of birth | Position | International | Previous | Joined |
|---|---|---|---|---|---|---|---|
| (Serbia) | 48 | Miodrag Pivaš | 17 May 2005 (age 21) | DF | (Serbia) Under-17 level | Jedinstvo Ub | 2024 |
| (England) | 38 | Johnny Emerson | 30 November 2005 (age 20) | MF | (Scotland) Under-19 level | — | — |
| (England) | 34 | Scott Bailey | 22 January 2006 (age 20) | MF | — | — | — |
| (England) | 35 | Dylan Charlton | 2 July 2006 (age 20) | DF | — | — | — |
| (England) | 42 | Fraser Harper | 2 October 2006 (age 20) | MF | — | Wolverhampton Wanderers | 2024 |
| (England) | 65 | Alex Walpole | 21 December 2006 (age 19) | GK | — | Huddersfield Town | 2026 |
| (Turkey) | 53 | Baran Yıldız | 2 January 2007 (age 19) | MF | — | Gençlerbirliği | 2025 |
| (England) | 52 | Logan Watts | 22 January 2007 (age 19) | DF | — | — | — |
| (Republic of Ireland) | 43 | Kyle Fitzgerald | 28 January 2007 (age 19) | FW | (Republic of Ireland) Under-18 level | Galway United | 2025 |
| (South Korea) | 47 | Park Seung-soo | 17 March 2007 (age 19) | MF | (South Korea) Under-23 level | Suwon Samsung Bluewings | 2025 |
| (England) | 50 | Trevan Sanusi | 25 April 2007 (age 19) | FW | (England) Under-18 level | Birmingham City | 2023 |
| (Guinea-Bissau) | 54 | Afner Cá | 8 July 2007 (age 19) | FW | — | Levante | 2026 |
| (England) | 36 | Luke Craggs | 14 July 2007 (age 19) | DF | — | — | — |
| (Georgia (country)) | 49 | Vakhtang Salia | 30 August 2007 (age 19) | FW | (Georgia (country)) Under-21 level | Dinamo Tbilisi | 2025 |
| (England) | 57 | Guy Bloomer | 13 September 2007 (age 19) | DF | — | — | — |
| (Libya) | — | Mo Waddani | 7 November 2007 (age 19) | MF | (Libya) Under-20 level | — | — |
| (England) | 56 | Henry Johnson | 1 January 2008 (age 18) | DF | — | — | — |
| (England) | 58 | Jake Durrant | 4 February 2008 (age 18) | DF | — | — | — |
| (England) | 64 | Kacey Wooster | 4 April 2008 (age 18) | FW | — | Southend United | 2023 |
| (England) | 59 | Aaron Epia | 7 April 2008 (age 18) | DF | (Poland) Under-19 level | Everton | 2024 |
| (England) | 63 | Tyler Jones (Note: Tyler Jones has a third year scholarship contract.) | 18 April 2008 (age 18) | GK | — | — | — |
| (Brazil) | 60 | Matheos Ferreira | 2 August 2008 (age 18) | MF | (Brazil) Under-20 level | — | — |

The players below are in the Under–21 age group for the 2026/27 and currently on loan at other clubs:

Under–21 players out on loan
| Nationality | Squad No | Player | Date of birth | Position | International | Previous | Joined |
|---|---|---|---|---|---|---|---|
| (England) | 45 | Anthony Munda (Note: Out on loan at Swindon Town.) | 8 September 2006 (age 20) | MF | (England) Under-18 level | — | — |
| (Spain) | — | Antonio Cordero (Note: Out on loan at Cádiz.) | 14 November 2006 (age 20) | MF | (Spain) Under-19 level | Málaga | 2025 |
| (England) | 31 | Aidan Harris (Note: Out on loan at Hebburn Town.) | 16 December 2006 (age 19) | GK | — | — | — |
| (England) | 51 | Leo Shahar (Note: Out on loan at Arouca.) | 18 March 2007 (age 19) | DF | (England) Under-19 level | Wolverhampton Wanderers | 2023 |
| (England) | 62 | Sean Neave (Note: Out on loan at Wolverhampton Wanderers.) | 27 May 2007 (age 19) | FW | (England) Under-20 level | — | — |
| (Guinea) | — | Ousmane Diabaté (Note: Out on loan at Gençlerbirliği.) | 24 September 2007 (age 19) | MF | (Guinea) Senior level | Gençlerbirliği | 2026 |
| (Republic of Ireland) | 61 | Rory Finneran (Note: Out on loan at Notts County.) | 29 February 2008 (age 18) | MF | (Republic of Ireland) Senior level | Blackburn Rovers | 2024 |

- Aladji Bamba, Matias Fernandez-Pardo, Ewen Jaouen, Lewis Miley, Sean Steur and Bazoumana Touré are Under–21 players, but are included in the first team squad.

=== Under–18 players ===
The players below are in the Under–18 age group; these are players born between 1 September 2008 and 30 August 2009 for the 2026/27 season and have second year academy contracts unless stated:

Under–18 players
| Nationality | Squad No | Player | Date of birth | Position | International | Previous | Joined |
|---|---|---|---|---|---|---|---|
| (England) | 80 | Ethan Ndiweni | 17 September 2008 (age 18) | FW | — | — | — |
| (England) | 81 | Thomas Old | 19 September 2008 (age 18) | DF | — | — | — |
| (England) | 82 | Jack Patterson | 19 September 2008 (age 18) | MF | — | — | — |
| (England) | 76 | Mason Miley (Note: Mason Miley has a professional contract.) | 29 September 2008 (age 18) | MF | — | — | — |
| (England) | 79 | Noah Morgan | 6 October 2008 (age 18) | DF | — | — | — |
| (England) | 83 | Sammy Pinnington (Note: Sammy Pinnington has a professional contract.) | 17 November 2008 (age 18) | FW | — | Luton Town | 2023 |
| (England) | 71 | Jack Callaghan | 6 December 2008 (age 17) | MF | — | — | — |
| (England) | 72 | Luke Gilligan | 14 December 2008 (age 17) | MF | — | — | — |
| (England) | 74 | Oliver Holland | 3 January 2009 (age 17) | GK | — | — | — |
| (Scotland) | 75 | Alfie Hutchison (Note: Alfie Hutchison has a professional contract.) | 22 January 2009 (age 17) | FW | (Scotland) Capped at Under-19 level | Rangers | 2025 |
| (Scotland) | 73 | Oliver Goodbrand (Note: Oliver Goodbrand has a professional contract.) | 9 February 2009 (age 17) | DF | (Scotland) Capped at Under-17 level | Rangers | 2025 |
| (England) | 77 | Michael Mills (Note: Michael Mills has a professional contract.) | 18 February 2009 (age 17) | FW | (England) Capped at Under-18 level | Port Vale | 2023 |
| (England) | 78 | Isaac Moran (Note: Isaac Moran has a professional contract.) | 14 March 2009 (age 17) | DF | (England) Capped at Under-15 level | Liverpool | 2025 |
| (England) | 70 | Sam Alabi (Note: Sam Alabi has a professional contract.) | 9 July 2009 (age 17) | MF | (England) Capped at Under-18 level | Oldham Athletic | 2023 |

- Johan Martínez will join from Independiente del Valle on 10 May 2027.

The players below are in the Under–17 age group; these are players born between 1 September 2009 and 30 August 2010 for the 2026/27 season and have first year scholarship contracts:

Under–17 players
| Nationality | Squad No | Player | Date of birth | Position | International | Previous | Joined |
|---|---|---|---|---|---|---|---|
| (England) | 44 | Kyran Thompson (Note: Kyran Thompson has a professional contract.) | 6 September 2009 (age 17) | FW | (England) Capped at Under-18 level | Arsenal | 2026 |
| (England) | 88 | George Mair (Note: George Mair has a professional contract.) | 28 September 2009 (age 17) | GK | (England) Capped at Under-17 level | — | — |
| (England) | 90 | Alfie Seldon (Note: Alfie Seldon has a professional contract.) | 20 October 2009 (age 17) | FW | — | — | — |
| (England) | 84 | Chukwudi Afumuzor | 21 October 2009 (age 17) | MF | — | Portsmouth | 2024 |
| (England) | 69 | Kyle Healy-Matthews | 25 November 2009 (age 16) | DF | — | West Ham United | 2026 |
| (England) | 68 | Christian Boothe | 27 November 2009 (age 16) | MF | — | Leicester City | 2026 |
| (England) | 86 | Roman Dowell | 3 December 2009 (age 16) | GK | (England) Capped at Under-18 level | — | — |
| (England) | 89 | Leon Mukumbira | 7 December 2009 (age 16) | FW | — | Peterborough United | 2024 |
| (England) | 91 | Lesecond Yeutembip | 1 January 2010 (age 16) | DF | (England) Capped at Under-16 level | Charlton Athletic | 2024 |
| (England) | 87 | Jayden Kouossu | 28 April 2010 (age 16) | MF | (England) Capped at Under-16 level | West Bromwich Albion | 2024 |
| (England) | 85 | Theo Benjamin | 1 August 2010 (age 16) | FW | — | — | — |

The players below are below the Under–17 age group, but already played at Under–18 level; these are players born on or after 1 September 2010 for the 2026/27 season:

Under–16 players
| Nationality | Squad No | Player | Date of birth | Position | International | Previous | Joined |
|---|---|---|---|---|---|---|---|
| (England) | — | Jack Skelton | 7 September 2010 (age 16) | FW | — | Newcastle Blue Star | 2023 |
| (England) | — | Jake Williams | 9 November 2010 (age 16) | DF | — | — | — |
| (England) | — | Thomas Bowness | 23 November 2010 (age 15) | FW | — | Carlisle United | 2025 |
| (England) | — | Muawiya Ghanem | 23 December 2010 (age 15) | MF | (England) Capped at Under-16 level | West Bromwich Albion | 2025 |
| (England) | — | Lennon Barber | 26 December 2010 (age 15) | MF | — | — | — |
| (England) | — | Leo Harper | 24 January 2011 (age 15) | GK | — | — | — |
| (England) | — | Charlie Robinson | 16 March 2011 (age 15) | FW | (England) Capped at Under-16 level | — | — |
| (England) | — | Lucas Flack | 2 July 2011 (age 15) | GK | — | Leyton Orient | 2025 |
| (England) | — | Isaac Conway | 19 December 2011 (age 14) | MF | — | — | — |

== Former players ==
=== Notable Academy and Youth Team players ===
The following is a list of players who have played in the Newcastle United youth team and represented a country (not necessarily their country of birth) at full international level. Players who are currently playing at Newcastle United, or for another club on loan from Newcastle United, are highlighted in bold.

- (Algeria) Mehdi Abeid
- (Australia) Curtis Good
- (Australia) Garang Kuol
- (Australia) James Troisi
- (Iceland) Bjarni Guðjónsson
- (Canada) David Edgar
- (Canada) Tyler Pasher
- (England) Elliot Anderson
- (England) Peter Beardsley
- (England) Bob Benson
- (England) Jack Carr
- (England) Andy Carroll
- (England) Fraser Forster
- (England) Paul Gascoigne
- (England) Steve Howey
- (England) Frank Hudspeth
- (England) Eric Keen
- (England) Alan Kennedy
- (England) Jackie Milburn
- (England) Jock Rutherford
- (England) Charlie Spencer
- (England) Steven Taylor
- (England) Alan Thompson
- (England) Tommy Thompson
- (England) Colin Veitch
- (England) Chris Waddle
- (France) Charles N'Zogbia
- (Faroe Islands) Jóan Edmundsson
- (Hungary) Tamás Kádár
- (Republic of Ireland) Rory Finneran
- (Republic of Ireland) Alan O'Brien
- (Liberia) Mohammed Sangare
- (Netherlands) Tim Krul
- (Nigeria) Shola Ameobi
- (Northern Ireland) Shane Ferguson
- (Northern Ireland) Aaron Hughes
- (Northern Ireland) Billy McCracken
- (New Zealand) David Rayner
- (Republic of the Congo) Yven Moyo
- (Scotland) Andy Aitken
- (Scotland) Frank Brennan
- (Scotland) Gary Caldwell
- (Scotland) Steven Caldwell
- (Scotland) Brian Kerr
- (Scotland) Tom McInnes
- (Scotland) Rob McKinnon
- (Scotland) Peter McWilliam
- (Scotland) Bobby Moncur
- (Scotland) Sandy Higgins
- (Scotland) Tommy Pearson
- (Slovenia) Haris Vučkić
- (South Africa) Bradley Cross
- (South Africa) Matty Pattison
- (South Africa) Tony Whitson
- (United States) Andrew Parkinson
- (Wales) Paul Dummett
- (Wales) Alan Neilson

== Awards ==
=== 'Wor Jackie' Award ===
Awarded to the best young player of the year, named after legendary local player Jackie Milburn.

- 1998: Aaron Hughes
- 1999: Michael Chopra
- 2000: Gary Caldwell
- 2001: Shola Ameobi
- 2002: Steven Taylor
- 2003: Peter Ramage
- 2004: Martin Brittain
- 2005: Paul Huntington
- 2006: Matty Pattison
- 2007: Andy Carroll
- 2008: Kazenga LuaLua
- 2009: Nile Ranger
- 2010: Bradden Inman
- 2011: Jak Alnwick
- 2012: Remie Streete
- 2013: Sammy Ameobi
- 2014: Adam Armstrong
- 2015: Rolando Aarons
- 2016: Michael Newberry
- 2017: Dan Barlaser
- 2018: Freddie Woodman
- 2019: Elias Sørensen
- 2020: Sean Longstaff
- 2022: Elliot Anderson
- 2023: Lewis Miley
- 2024: Aidan Harris
- 2025: Sean Neave
- 2026: Anthony Munda

=== Jack Hixon Award ===
Named after Jack Hixon, a local scout who found several North-East youngsters who went on to become Professional Footballers.

- 2010: Remie Streete
- 2011: Adam Campbell
- 2012: Alex Gilliead
- 2013: Adam Armstrong
- 2014: Mackenzie Heaney
- 2015: Freddie Woodman
- 2016: Owen Gallacher
- 2017: Callum Roberts
- 2018: Sean Longstaff
- 2019: Liam Gibson
- 2020: Matthew Longstaff
- 2022: Lewis Miley

From 2023, the award was given to emerging female footballers.

=== Manchester United Premier Cup's Most Valuable Player ===
- 2010: Adam Campbell
