= Ousmane Diabaté =

Ousmane Diabaté may refer to:

- Ousmane Diabaté (footballer, born 1994), Nigerien footballer for Al-Sadaqa
- Ousmane Diabaté (footballer, born 2007), Guinean footballer for Gençlerbirliği
