= Lukáš Horníček =

Czech footballer (born 2002)

- Horníček playing for Newcastle United in 2026

Personal information
- Date of birth: 13 July 2002 (age 24)
- Place of birth: Vysoké Mýto, Czech Republic
- Height: 1.97 m (6 ft 6 in)
- Position: Goalkeeper

Team information
- Current team: Newcastle United
- Number: 21

Youth career
- 2008–2009: Sokol Dobříkov
- 2009–2020: Pardubice
- 2019–2020: → Braga (loan)
- 2020–2021: Braga

Senior career*
Years	Team	Apps	(Gls)
2021–2026	Braga B	37	(0)
2021–2026	Braga	52	(0)
2026–	Newcastle United	10	(0)

International career^{‡}
2018	Czech Republic U16	1	(0)
2018–2019	Czech Republic U17	12	(0)
2019	Czech Republic U18	2	(0)
2019	Czech Republic U19	1	(0)
2021–2023	Czech Republic U20	4	(0)
2023–2025	Czech Republic U21	12	(0)
2026–	Czech Republic	3	(0)
- * Club domestic league appearances and goals as of 17:57, 7 November 2026 (UTC) ‡ National team caps and goals as of 18:00, 8 October 2026 (UTC)

Lukáš Horníček (born 13 July 2002) is a Czech professional footballer who plays as a goalkeeper for Premier League club Newcastle United and the Czech Republic national team.

== Early life ==
Horníček was born in the hospital in Vysoké Mýto, but he is a native of the nearby village of Dobříkov. His father was goalkeeper in the local football club.

== Club career ==
Horníček is a youth product of the academies of the Czech clubs Sokol Dobříkov and Pardubice. On 19 July 2019, he signed on a trial loan with the Portuguese club Braga for one year with an option to buy. On 24 July 2020, he signed permanently with Braga in what was Pardubice's biggest sale in their history. He was named the best goalkeeper for the Liga Revelação 2020–21 season for Braga's youth team. For the 2021–22 season, he was promoted to Braga B. He made his first senior debut with Braga in a 5–0 Taça de Portugal win over Moitense, coming on as a late substitute in the 85th minute. He made his Primeira Liga debut with Braga in a 3–2 loss to Famalicão on 15 May 2022.

=== Newcastle United ===
On 3 August 2026, Horníček signed for Premier League club Newcastle United.

== International career ==
Horníček is a youth international for the Czech Republic, having represented the Czech Republic U17s at the 2019 UEFA European Under-17 Championship.

On 31 May 2026, he made his senior debut in a 2–1 friendly win over Kosovo. After the game, he was confirmed in the 26-man squad heading for the 2026 FIFA World Cup.

== Career statistics ==
=== Club ===
As of match played 7 November 2026

Appearances and goals by club, season and competition
Club	Season	League			National cup (Note: Includes Taça de Portugal)		League cup (Note: Includes Taça da Liga, EFL Cup)		Europe		Total	
Club	Season	Division	Apps	Goals	Apps	Goals	Apps	Goals	Apps	Goals	Apps	Goals
Braga B	2021–22	Liga 3	26	0	—		—		—		26	0
Braga B	2022–23	Liga 3	11	0	—		—		—		11	0
Braga B	Total		37	0	—		—		—		37	0
Braga	2021–22	Primeira Liga	1	0	1	0	0	0	0	0	2	0
Braga	2022–23	Primeira Liga	1	0	0	0	1	0	0	0	2	0
Braga	2023–24	Primeira Liga	0	0	2	0	2	0	0	0	4	0
Braga	2024–25	Primeira Liga	17	0	3	0	0	0	4 (Note: Appearances in UEFA Europa League)	0	24	0
Braga	2025–26	Primeira Liga	33	0	0	0	3	0	19	0	55	0
Braga	2026–27	Primeira Liga	—		—		—		1 (Note: Appearance in UEFA Conference League)	0	1	0
Braga	Total		52	0	6	0	6	0	24	0	88	0
Newcastle United	2026–27	Premier League	10	0	0	0	2	0	—		12	0
Career total			99	0	6	0	8	0	24	0	137	0

=== International ===
As of match played 6 October 2026

Appearances and goals by national team and year
National team	Year	Apps	Goals
Czech Republic	2026	3	0
Total		3	0

== Honours ==
Braga

- Taça de Portugal: 2020–21
- Taça da Liga: 2023–24
