= Dobříkov =

- Municipality
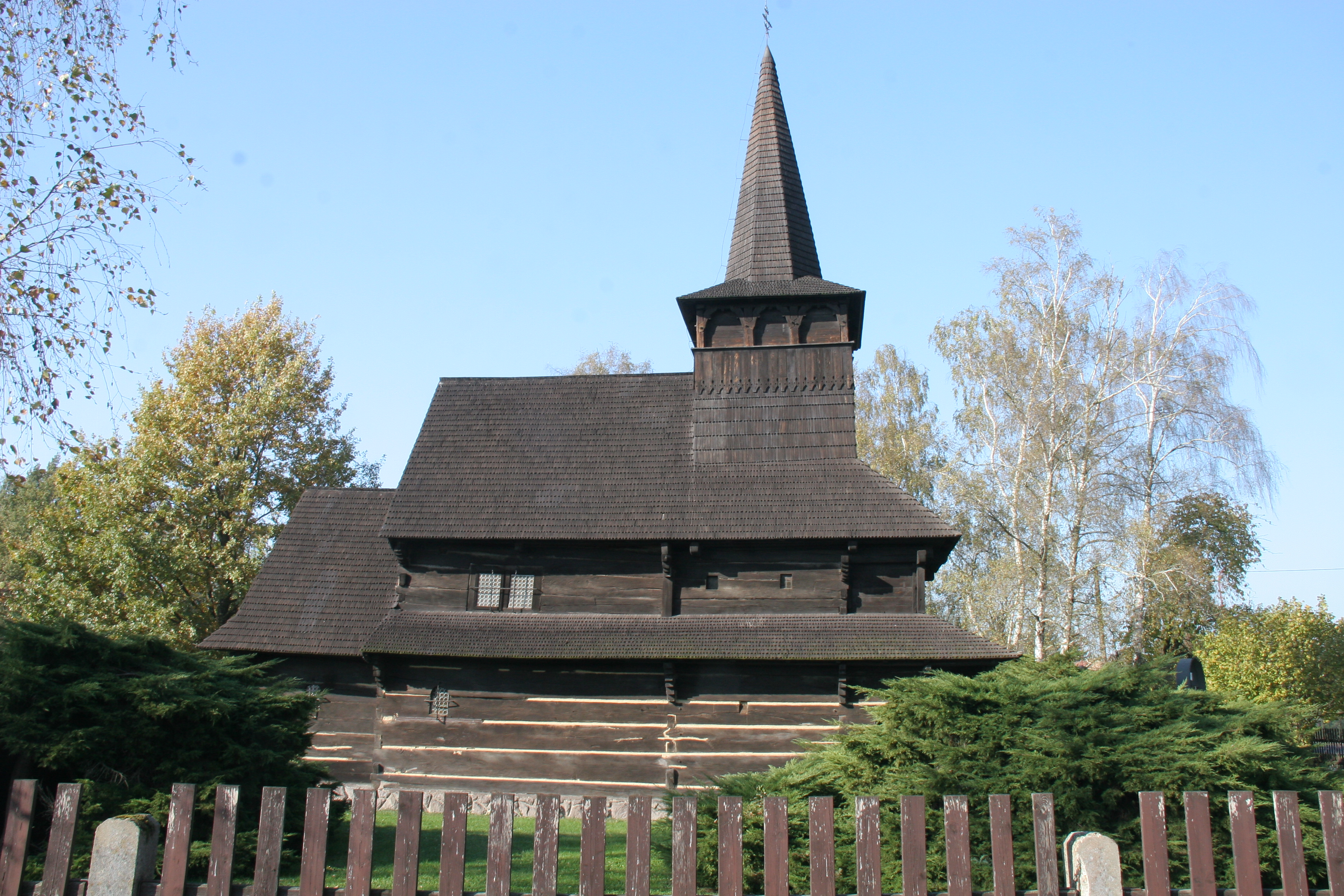
- Church of All Saints

- Flag Coat of arms

- Location in the Czech Republic
- Coordinates: 50°0′9″N 16°8′2″E
- Country: Czech Republic
- Region: Pardubice
- District: Ústí nad Orlicí
- First mentioned: 1356

Area
  - Total: 8.52 km^{2} (3.29 sq mi)
- Elevation: 264 m (866 ft)

Population (2026-01-01)
  - Total: 590
  - Density: 69/km^{2} (180/sq mi)
- Time zone: UTC+1 (CET)
  - Summer (DST): UTC+2 (CEST)
- Postal code: 566 01
- Website: www.dobrikov.cz

Dobříkov (German: Dobrikow) is a municipality and village in Ústí nad Orlicí District in the Pardubice Region of the Czech Republic. It has about 600 inhabitants.

== Administrative division ==
Dobříkov consists of two municipal parts (in brackets population according to the 2021 census):

- Dobříkov (470)
- Rzy (77)

== Demographics ==
Historical population
Year	Pop.	±%
1869	525	—
1880	530	+1.0%
1890	578	+9.1%
1900	565	−2.2%
1910	550	−2.7%
1921	554	+0.7%
1930	570	+2.9%
1950	509	−10.7%
1961	483	−5.1%
1970	465	−3.7%
1980	473	+1.7%
1991	431	−8.9%
2001	449	+4.2%
2011	478	+6.5%
2021	547	+14.4%
Source: Censuses

== Notable people ==
- Lukáš Horníček (born 2002), footballer
