= Lewis Miley =

English footballer (born 2006)

- Miley playing for Newcastle United in 2026

Personal information
- Full name: Lewis Miley
- Date of birth: 1 May 2006 (age 20)
- Place of birth: Stanley, England
- Height: 6 ft 2 in (1.89 m)
- Position: Midfielder

Team information
- Current team: Newcastle United
- Number: 67

Youth career
- 2013–2023: Newcastle United

Senior career*
| Years | Team | Apps | (Gls) |
| 2023– | Newcastle United | 64 | (3) |

International career^{‡}
| 2022–2023 | England U17 | 10 | (1) |
| 2023–2025 | England U19 | 5 | (0) |
| 2024– | England U20 | 1 | (0) |
| 2024– | England U21 | 5 | (0) |
- * Club domestic league appearances and goals as of 18:00, 21 November 2026 (UTC) ‡ National team caps and goals as of 13:27, 19 November 2025 (UTC)

Lewis Miley (born 1 May 2006) is an English professional footballer who plays mainly as a midfielder for Premier League club Newcastle United and the England under-21 national team. Mainly a central midfielder, he can also be deployed as a defensive midfielder or right full back.

== Club career ==
=== Newcastle United ===
==== 2022–23 season ====
Miley joined the Newcastle United Academy at the age of seven. He made his first-team debut in a friendly against Al Hilal in 2022. In November 2022, he won the club's Jack Hixon Award for most promising youngster. Miley first appeared in the senior match day squad as a substitute in a Premier League fixture against AFC Bournemouth in February 2023. He signed his first professional contract for the club in May 2023.

Miley made his Premier League debut on 28 May 2023. Coming on as a 76th minute substitute against Chelsea, he became Newcastle United's youngest ever Premier League player.

==== 2023–24 season ====
On 27 September, Miley started a competitive first team game for the first time in a 1–0 win over Manchester City in the third round of the EFL Cup. On 7 November, he made his Champions League debut, coming off the bench in the 81st minute, in a 2–0 defeat against Borussia Dortmund, becoming the youngest Newcastle United player to feature in European competitions, aged 17 years and 191 days, breaking previous record of Adam Campbell. On 11 November, Miley was named in the starting lineup for the first time in the Premier League in a 2–0 loss against AFC Bournemouth.

On 25 November, Miley played 90 minutes, getting his first Premier League goal contribution by assisting Alexander Isak's opening goal in a 4–1 win against Chelsea at St James' Park. At the age of 17 years and 208 days, he became the youngest ever Newcastle United player to assist a Premier League goal. Three days later, he started his first Champions League match, which ended in a 1–1 away draw against Paris Saint-Germain, becoming the third youngest Englishman to start in that competition after Jude Bellingham and Phil Foden.

Amidst a large number of player injuries at the club, from mid-November Miley became a consistent feature in the starting lineups, being praised by club manager Eddie Howe as a player who "straight away looked part of the group", with a "brilliant brain".

On 13 December, during the final Champions League group stage matchday against Milan, Miley made history by becoming the youngest player in UEFA Champions League history to provide an assist for an English club at the age of 17 years and 226 days. Three days later, he scored his first goal for Newcastle in a 3–0 win over Fulham, in which he became the youngest player to score in the Premier League since Federico Macheda in 2009, and the youngest ever player to score for Newcastle in that competition.

On 29 January 2024, Miley signed a new long-term contract with the club.

==== 2024–present ====
Miley playing for Newcastle United against AFC Bournemouth on 5 September 2026.

In July 2024, Miley sustained a broken metatarsal which sidelined him for 12 weeks with injury. On 12 January 2025, he scored his first FA Cup goal in a 3–1 win over Bromley. A few months later, on 16 March, he achieved his first title with the club following a 2–1 win over Liverpool in the EFL Cup final. Later that year, on 10 December, he netted his first UEFA Champions League goal in a 2–2 away draw with Bayer Leverkusen, becoming the youngest Newcastle player to achieve this feat, aged 19 years and 223 days, breaking previous record of Hugo Viana in 2002.

== International career ==
Miley was first called up to represent England for the 2022 Nordic Championship with the under-17 team, playing matches against Norway U16, Faroe Islands U17 and Finland U17. His first international goal came against Finland in a 2–1 win. He helped England to qualify for the 2023 UEFA European Under-17 Championship with caps in March 2023.

Miley was part of the preliminary England squad for the 2023 UEFA European Under-17 Championship but was withdrawn by Newcastle United in order to feature on the bench for the first team in a league fixture against Brighton & Hove Albion.

On 6 September 2023, Miley made his England U19 debut during a 1–0 defeat to Germany in Oliva.

On 22 March 2024, Miley made his debut for the England Elite League squad during a 5–1 win over Poland at the Białystok Municipal Stadium.

On 15 November 2024, after recently returning from a back injury, Miley made his debut for the England under-21 team as a second-half substitute in a 0–0 draw with Spain.

== Personal life ==
Miley was born in Stanley, County Durham, and was educated at Tanfield School. He is a boyhood supporter of Newcastle United. His older brother, Jamie, is also a footballer who plays for Hartlepool United. while his younger brother Mason made his first matchday squad appearance for Newcastle against Leeds United on 14th September 2026.

== Career statistics ==
As of match played 21 November 2026

Appearances and goals by club, season and competition
| Club | Season | League | | | FA Cup | | EFL Cup | | Europe | | Total | |
| Club | Season | Division | Apps | Goals | Apps | Goals | Apps | Goals | Apps | Goals | Apps | Goals |
|---|---|---|---|---|---|---|---|---|---|---|---|---|
| Newcastle United | 2022–23 | Premier League | 1 | 0 | 0 | 0 | 0 | 0 | — | | 1 | 0 |
| Newcastle United | 2023–24 | Premier League | 17 | 1 | 4 | 0 | 2 | 0 | 3 (Note: Appearances in UEFA Champions League) | 0 | 26 | 1 |
| Newcastle United | 2024–25 | Premier League | 14 | 1 | 3 | 1 | 2 | 0 | — | | 19 | 2 |
| Newcastle United | 2025–26 | Premier League | 23 | 1 | 1 | 0 | 3 | 1 | 7 | 1 | 34 | 3 |
| Newcastle United | 2026–27 | Premier League | 9 | 0 | 0 | 0 | 2 | 0 | — | | 11 | 0 |
| Career total | | | 64 | 3 | 8 | 1 | 9 | 1 | 10 | 1 | 91 | 6 |

== Honours ==
Newcastle United

- EFL Cup: 2024–25
