= Sean Neave =

English association football player (born 2007)

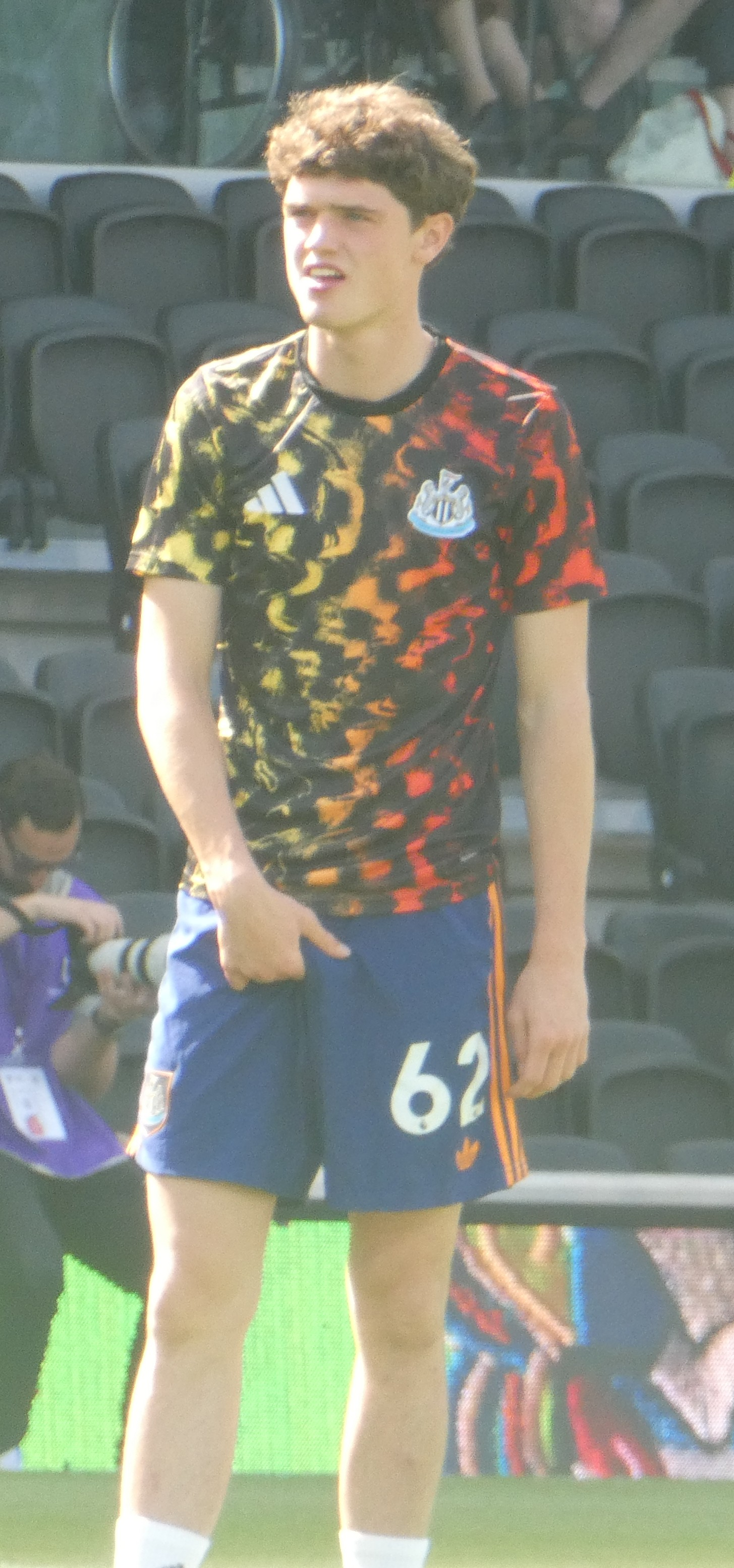
- Neave with Newcastle United in 2026

Personal information
- Full name: Sean Thomas Neave
- Date of birth: 27 May 2007 (age 19)
- Place of birth: Winlaton Upon Blaydon, England
- Position: Striker

Team information
- Current team: Wolverhampton Wanderers (on loan from Newcastle United)
- Number: 14

Youth career
- 2020–2025: Newcastle United

Senior career*
Years	Team	Apps	(Gls)
2025–	Newcastle United	1	(0)
2026–	→ Wolves (loan)	8	(2)

International career^{‡}
2023	England U17	2	(0)
2024	England U18	2	(0)
2026	England U19	1	(0)
2026–	England U20	2	(0)
- * Club domestic league appearances and goals as of 18:57, 5 November 2026 (UTC) ‡ National team caps and goals as of 00:18, 18 November 2026 (UTC)

Sean Thomas Neave (born 27 May 2007) is an English professional footballer who plays as a forward for EFL Championship club Wolverhampton Wanderers on loan from Premier League club Newcastle United. He is an England youth international.

== Club career ==
Neave started his youth career at Wallsend Boys Club before joining the academy at Newcastle United. A striker, he was a regular goal scorer throughout his time with the Newcastle academy system, including 17 goals in his first 30 games for Newcastle U18. He signed a first professional contract with the club in July 2024. That summer, he featured in the 2024 HKFC Soccer Sevens for Newcastle U21.

Neave was included in the Newcastle first-team match-day squad on 8 February 2025, named as a substitute for their FA Cup fourth round tie away at Birmingham City. He was an unused substitute as Newcastle won the 2025 EFL Cup final 2-1 against Liverpool on 16 March 2025 to claim their first major trophy for seventy years.

On 18 February 2026, Neave made his debut for Newcastle coming on as a substitute for Harvey Barnes in a 6–1 win over Qarabağ FK in the Champions League. He made his Premier League debut for Newcastle during a 2-0 defeat against Fulham on the final day of the 2025-26 season.

On 2 September 2026, he signed for EFL Championship club Wolverhampton Wanderers on a season-long loan. On 4 November, Neave scored his first two goals for Wolves in a comeback 2-1 league victory away against Bristol City.

== International career ==
Neave is an England U18 international.

On 28 March 2026, Neave made his England U19 debut as a substitute during a 1–0 2026 UEFA European Under-19 Championship qualification win over Poland.

== Style of play ==
Described as a "rangy striker", he was approaching the height of 6ft 1 inches by the age of 17.

== Personal life ==
Neave attended Thorp Academy in Ryton, Tyne and Wear. He and his family reside in the village of Winlaton.

== Career statistics ==
As of match played 20 October 2026

Appearances and goals by club, season and competition
Club	Season	League			FA Cup		League Cup		Europe		Other		Total	
Club	Season	Division	Apps	Goals	Apps	Goals	Apps	Goals	Apps	Goals	Apps	Goals	Apps	Goals
Newcastle United U21	2023–24	—			—		—		—		1 (Note: Appearance(s) in EFL Trophy)	0	1	0
Newcastle United U21	2024–25	—			—		—		—		2	0	2	0
Newcastle United U21	2025–26	—			—		—		—		3	1	3	1
Newcastle United U21	Total		—		—		—		—		6	1	6	1
Newcastle United	2025–26	Premier League	1	0	0	0	0	0	1 (Note: Appearance in UEFA Champions League)	0	—		2	0
Newcastle United	2026–27	Premier League	0	0	—		0	0	—		—		0	0
Newcastle United	Total		1	0	0	0	0	0	1	0	—		2	0
Wolverhampton Wanderers (loan)	2026–27	Championship	7	2	0	0	1	0	—		—		8	2
Career total			8	2	0	0	1	0	1	0	6	1	16	3

== Honours ==
Newcastle United

- EFL Cup: 2024–25
