= Leo Shahar =

English-Israeli footballer (born 2007)

Personal information
- Full name: Leo Oren Shahar
- Date of birth: 18 March 2007 (age 19)
- Place of birth: Tettenhall, England, United Kingdom
- Height: 1.78 m (5 ft 10 in)
- Positions: Defender; midfielder

Team information
- Current team: Arouca (on loan from Newcastle United)
- Number: 2

Youth career
- 2013–2023: Wolverhampton Wanderers
- 2023–2025: Newcastle United

Senior career*
Years	Team	Apps	(Gls)
2025–	Newcastle United	0	(0)
2026–	→ Arouca (loan)	0	(0)

International career^{‡}
2022	England U15	5	(0)
2022–2023	England U16	9	(0)
2023–2024	England U17	11	(0)
2024–2025	England U18	7	(1)
2025	England U19	7	(0)
- * Club domestic league appearances and goals ‡ National team caps and goals as of 18 November 2025

Leo Oren Shahar (born 18 March 2007) is an English professional footballer who plays as a defender and as a midfielder for Portuguese Primeira Liga club Arouca on loan from English Premier League club Newcastle United.

== Club career ==
Shahar was born in Wolverhampton, England, and as a youth player joined the youth system of his local club Wolverhampton Wanderers. Following his stint there, he joined the academy of Premier League side Newcastle United in 2023, where he played in the UEFA Youth League and was promoted to the club's senior team in 2025. English newspaper Evening Chronicle wrote in 2025 that Shahar "established himself as one of the most promising prospects in the Magpies youth setup" while playing for the club.

On 24 February 2026, Shahar made his professional club debut for Newcastle United as a substitute in a UEFA Champions League knockout phase play-off victory against Qarabağ.

On 4th September 2026, Shahar was loaned to Arouca for the 2026–27 season.

== International career ==
Shahar is an England youth international. During May 2024, he played for England U17 at the 2024 UEFA European Under-17 Championship. Shahar started all four of their games at the tournament including the quarter-final elimination against Italy.

== Career statistics ==
As of match played 24 February 2026

Appearances and goals by club, season and competition
Club	Season	League			FA Cup		EFL Cup		Europe		Other		Total	
Club	Season	Division	Apps	Goals	Apps	Goals	Apps	Goals	Apps	Goals	Apps	Goals	Apps	Goals
Newcastle United	2025–26	Premier League	0	0	0	0	0	0	1 (Note: Appearance in UEFA Champions League)	0	—		1	0
Career total			0	0	0	0	0	0	1	0	0	0	1	0
