= Aladji Bamba =

French footballer (born 2006)

- Bamba playing for Newcastle United in 2026

Personal information
- Date of birth: 14 July 2006 (age 20)
- Place of birth: Blois, France
- Height: 1.93 m (6 ft 4 in)
- Position: Defensive midfielder

Team information
- Current team: Newcastle United
- Number: 8

Youth career
- 2011–2021: Blois
- 2021–2025: Monaco

Senior career*
Years	Team	Apps	(Gls)
2025–2026	Monaco	18	(0)
2026–	Newcastle United	3	(0)

International career^{‡}
2023	France U18	5	(0)
2024–2025	France U19	9	(1)
2025–	France U20	7	(0)
- * Club domestic league appearances and goals as of 23:02, 17 May 2026 (UTC) ‡ National team caps and goals as of 23:02, 7 September 2025 (UTC)

Aladji Bamba (born 14 July 2006) is a French professional footballer who plays as a defensive midfielder for Premier League club Newcastle United.

== Club career ==
Bamba is a product of the youth academies of his youth team from Blois and Monaco for three seasons. On 22 February 2024, he signed his first professional contract with Monaco. He made his senior and professional debut with Les Rouge et Blanc in a 3–1 Ligue 1 match against Le Havre on 16 August 2025.

=== Newcastle United ===
On 24 July 2026, Bamba signed for Premier League club Newcastle United on a five-year deal. The transfer fee was reported to be £34m.

== International career ==
Born in France, Bamba is of Guinean descent. He was part of the France U20s that won the 2025 Maurice Revello Tournament.

== Personal life ==
Aladji's brother, Malamine Mohamed Bamba, also came through Monaco's youth academy, and plays for the Slovenian club NK Maribor.

== Career statistics ==
As of match played 17 May 2026

Appearances and goals by club, season and competition
Club	Season	League			National cup (Note: Includes Coupe de France)		League cup		Europe		Other		Total	
Club	Season	Division	Apps	Goals	Apps	Goals	Apps	Goals	Apps	Goals	Apps	Goals	Apps	Goals
Monaco	2025–26	Ligue 1	18	0	2	0	—		5 (Note: Appearances in UEFA Champions League)	0	—		25	0
Newcastle United	2026–27	Premier League	3	0	0	0	0	0	—		—		0	0
Career total			18	0	2	0	0	0	5	0	0	0	25	0

== Honours ==
France U20

- Maurice Revello Tournament: 2025
