= Ewen Jaouen =

French footballer (born 2005)

Personal information
- Date of birth: 29 December 2005 (age 20)
- Place of birth: Paris, France
- Height: 1.97 m (6 ft 6 in)
- Position: Goalkeeper

Team information
- Current team: Newcastle United
- Number: 24

Youth career
- 2012–2013: ES Manche Atlantique
- 2013–2018: GDR Guipavas
- 2018–2022: Guingamp

Senior career*
Years	Team	Apps	(Gls)
2022–2023	Guingamp B	29	(0)
2023–2025	Reims B	15	(0)
2024–2026	Reims	34	(0)
2024	→ Rodez (loan)	6	(0)
2024–2025	→ Dunkerque (loan)	14	(0)
2026–	Newcastle United	0	(0)

International career^{‡}
2021	France U17	1	(0)
2022	France U18	1	(0)
2024	France U19	1	(0)
2024	France U20	1	(0)
2025–	France U21	2	(0)
- * Club domestic league appearances and goals as of 11 May 2026 ‡ National team caps and goals as of 23:00, 17 November 2025 (UTC)

Ewen Jaouen (born 29 December 2005) is a French professional footballer who plays as a goalkeeper for Premier League club Newcastle United.

== Club career ==
Jaouen's family moved to Brittany when he was five years old, where he began his footballing career. He signed for the academy of Guingamp in 2018, aged 12, where he would eventually play for the reserves in 2022.

On 3 July 2023, Jaouen signed for Reims's reserve team. On 19 April 2024, he signed for Ligue 2 club Rodez on loan until the end of the season after injuries to the club's goalkeepers. On 13 July 2024, he signed on loan for Ligue 2 club Dunkerque for the rest of the season. On 4 February 2025, he saved one penalty and scored the winning penalty in a 5–4 shoot-out victory (1–1 draw) over Lille in the Coupe de France round of 16.

On 10 June 2026, Jaouen signed for Newcastle United on a long-term contract.

== International career ==
Jaouen is a France youth international. He made his debut for the France under-17s in 2021.

== Personal life ==
Born in Paris, France, Jaouen has German and Breton descent. He grew up supporting Brest.

== Career statistics ==
As of match played 26 August 2026

Appearances and goals by club, season and competition
Club	Season	League			National cup (Note: Includes Coupe de France)		League cup (Note: Includes EFL Cup)		Other		Total	
Club	Season	Division	Apps	Goals	Apps	Goals	Apps	Goals	Apps	Goals	Apps	Goals
Guingamp B	2021–22	CFA 2	7	0	—		—		—		7	0
Guingamp B	2022–23	CFA 2	22	0	—		—		—		22	0
Guingamp B	Total		29	0	—		—		—		29	0
Reims B	2023–24	Championnat National 3	15	0	—		—		—		15	0
Reims B	2025–26	Championnat National 3	0	0	—		—		—		0	0
Reims B	Total		15	0	—		—		—		15	0
Rodez (loan)	2023–24	Ligue 2	6	0	0	0	—		2 (Note: Appearances in Ligue 1 relegation/promotion play-offs)	0	8	0
Dunkerque (loan)	2024–25	Ligue 2	14	0	6	0	—		2	0	22	0
Reims	2025–26	Ligue 2	34	0	6	0	—		—		40	0
Newcastle United	2026–27	Premier League	0	0	0	0	1	0	0	0	1	0
Career total			98	0	12	0	1	0	4	0	115	0
