= Darsley Park =

Training ground of Newcastle United

Coordinates: 55.00972°N 1.55983°W

Newcastle United Training Centre, more commonly known as "Darsley Park" is the training ground of Premier League club Newcastle United. It lies next door to the Northumberland Football Association base at Whitley Park, North Tyneside, England.

Since July 2003 Newcastle United's first team have trained at the purpose-built centre. The academy train in a separate facility at Little Benton, south of Darsley Park.

The complex comprises four buildings: the main building which houses the main reception, changing rooms, managerial offices, meeting rooms, gym, physiotherapy, restaurant and a recreation area. Adjacent to this is the laundry area where all the strips and training gear are taken care of. Next, is the indoor pitch, a full-size pitch with a rubber-based astroturf, called FieldTurf, shielded from the elements by a tough canvas covering. Finally there is the green-keepers' building.
