= Ousmane Diabaté (footballer, born 2007) =

Guinean footballer (born 2007)

Personal information
- Full name: Ousmane Diabaté
- Date of birth: 24 September 2007 (age 19)
- Place of birth: Guinea
- Position: Defensive midfielder

Team information
- Current team: Gençlerbirliği (on loan from Newcastle United)
- Number: 42

Senior career*
Years	Team	Apps	(Gls)
2024–2025	Académie SOAR	20	(1)
2025–2026	Gençlerbirliği	4	(0)
2026–	Newcastle United	0	(0)
2026–	→ Gençlerbirliği (loan)	7	(1)

International career^{‡}
2026–	Guinea	3	(0)
- * Club domestic league appearances and goals as of 17:10, 12 October 2026 (UTC) ‡ National team caps and goals as of 17:10, 12 October 2026 (UTC)

Ousmane Diabaté (born 24 September 2007) is a Guinean professional footballer who plays as a defensive midfielder for Süper Lig club Gençlerbirliği, on loan from Premier League club Newcastle United, and the Guinea national team.

== Club career ==
Diabaté developed at Académie SOAR, based in the Ratoma district of Conakry, where he made approximately 20 appearances in the Guinée Championnat National and scored directly from a free-kick. Despite the club's relegation to the second division, his performances attracted attention from European scouts, and he was named a standout performer at the 4th African Youth Cup held in Conakry.

Diabaté subsequently agreed a three-year deal with Danish club FC Midtjylland. As he had not yet reached the age of 18, the agreement included a clause allowing him to join Gençlerbirliği in Turkey in the interim. He joined Gençlerbirliği in December 2025 and quickly broke into the first-team squad, making appearances in both the Süper Lig and the Turkish Cup during the 2025–26 season.

== International career ==
In May 2026, Diabaté was called up to the Guinea senior squad by head coach Paulo Duarte for a friendly against Northern Ireland on 4 June 2026 in Spain, as part of the June 2026 FIFA international window.
