= Sam Alabi =

English footballer (born 2009)

Personal information
- Full name: Adedamola Samuel Ireoluwajoba Alabi
- Date of birth: 9 July 2009 (age 17)
- Place of birth: Manchester, England
- Position: Midfielder

Team information
- Current team: Newcastle United
- Number: 85

Youth career
- –2023: Oldham Athletic
- 2023–: Newcastle United

Senior career*
Years	Team	Apps	(Gls)
2025–	Newcastle United	0	(0)

International career^{‡}
2024–2025	England U16	11	(0)
2025–2026	England U17	6	(0)
2026–	England U18	3	(0)
- * Club domestic league appearances and goals ‡ National team caps and goals as of 11 Oct 2026

Adedamola Samuel Ireoluwajoba Alabi (born 9 July 2009) is an English professional footballer who plays as a midfielder for Newcastle United.

== Early life ==
Alabi was born on 9 July 2009 in Manchester, England. A native of the city, he is of Nigerian descent through his parents.

== Club career ==
As a youth player, Alabi joined the youth academy of Oldham Athletic. Following his stint there, he joined the youth academy of Premier League side Newcastle United ahead of the 2023–24 season.

He appeared in a first team squad for the first time during the 2025–26 season, being named on the bench for their 2025–26 UEFA Champions League group match against Marseille.

Alabi signed his first professional contract with Newcastle on 9 July 2026.

== International career ==
Alabi is an England youth international and captained the England national under-17 football team. During October and November 2025, he played for the England national under-17 football team for 2026 UEFA European Under-17 Championship qualification.

== Style of play ==
Alabi plays as a midfielder. Left-footed, he is known for his dribbling and passing ability.
