= 2007–08 Newcastle United F.C. season =

Newcastle United
2007–08 season
- Chairman: Chris Mort
- Manager: Sam Allardyce (until 9 January 2008); Nigel Pearson (9–16 January 2008); Kevin Keegan (from 16 January 2008)
- Premier League: 12th
- FA Cup: Fourth round
- League Cup: Third round
- Top goalscorer: League: Michael Owen (11); All: Michael Owen (13)
- Highest home attendance: 52,307 (vs. Liverpool)
- Lowest home attendance: 30,523 (vs. Barnsley)
Home colours	Away colours	Third colours

During the 2007–08 season, Newcastle United participated in the Premier League. Newcastle started the season reasonably well under the management of Sam Allardyce and looked to be in the hunt for European places by the end of October, but a poor November saw the team slide down the table as fans began doubting Allardyce's ability. Despite a reasonable upturn in early December, the team fell further form wise and in the end Mike Ashley chose to terminate Allardyce's contract by mutual consent.

To the surprise of many football fans, the club re-appointed Kevin Keegan as manager, but he was unable to stop the team sliding down the league and fans begun to doubt the appointment. However, Keegan was able to save Newcastle from relegation and the club finished the season in 12th. The team kit for the 2007–08 season was produced by Adidas. The main shirt sponsor was Northern Rock.

== Season summary ==
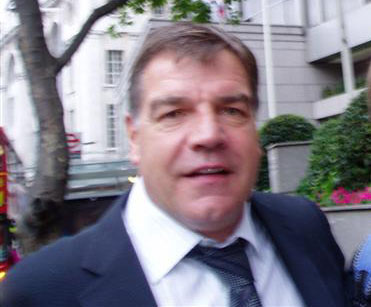
Sam Allardyce

Manager Sam Allardyce signed several players, including David Rozehnal, Caçapa, Habib Beye, Alan Smith, Joey Barton and Mark Viduka. The season started brightly for Newcastle, with two wins and two draws from their first five games, but they then became the first (and only) side to lose to Derby County that season. Newcastle won only five out of their next 25 Premier League games and could only draw with Derby in the reverse fixture. They also made a third round exit to Arsenal in the League Cup, but made a FA Cup third round draw with Championship club Stoke City. The game against Stoke, however, proved to be Allardyce's last in charge of Newcastle; three days later he was sacked by owner Mike Ashley after pressure from the fans, who were unimpressed with his exclusion of fan favourites from the starting line-up and poor results, despite Allardyce only having been there eight months.

Critics consistently questioned Allardyce's exit from the club, claiming he may not have been given the time needed to impact upon the club in the build-up to the next appointment. There were a number of candidates lined up for the job, including Harry Redknapp, Didier Deschamps, Gérard Houllier and even former England and Middlesbrough manager Steve McClaren. Redknapp turned down the opportunity to manage the club, claiming he felt his job at Portsmouth was yet to be completed.

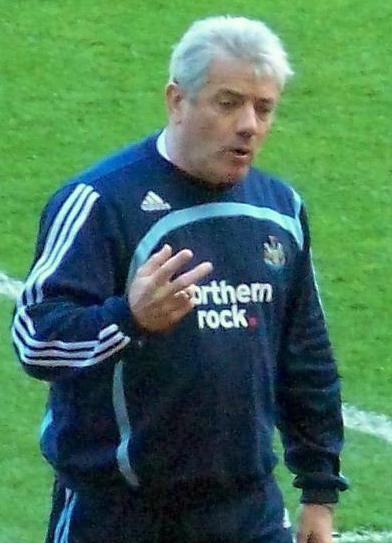
Kevin Keegan, April 2008

On 16 January, it was sensationally announced that Kevin Keegan would be returning to the club for a third time, after previous spells both as a player and manager.

The announcement had an immediate impact. On that day the club had a scheduled FA Cup third round replay against Stoke City at home, which was not expected to reach even half capacity; but, upon distribution of the news, 20,000 extra tickets were sold within a couple of hours and the kick-off was delayed to allow the extra fans time to get into the game. The Keegan effect seemed to work on the pitch too as Newcastle convincingly beat Stoke 4–1, even though he was not in the dugout for the match, having arrived during the first half to sit with owner Mike Ashley and the directors.

Shortly after his appointment, Dennis Wise left his position as manager at Leeds United to become director of football at Newcastle. The creation of the new role at the club proved questionable amongst critics and fans, but both Wise and Keegan insisted that the manager would have the final say in all matters regarding the squad. Further appointments saw Tony Jimenez join the club as the vice-president of player recruitment and Jeff Vetere as technical co-ordinator. The idea was to complete a continental-style management structure working in support of Keegan, with Wise and Vetere making the initial assessment before calling in Jimenez to do the deal. David Williamson was also appointed, as director of operations in April.

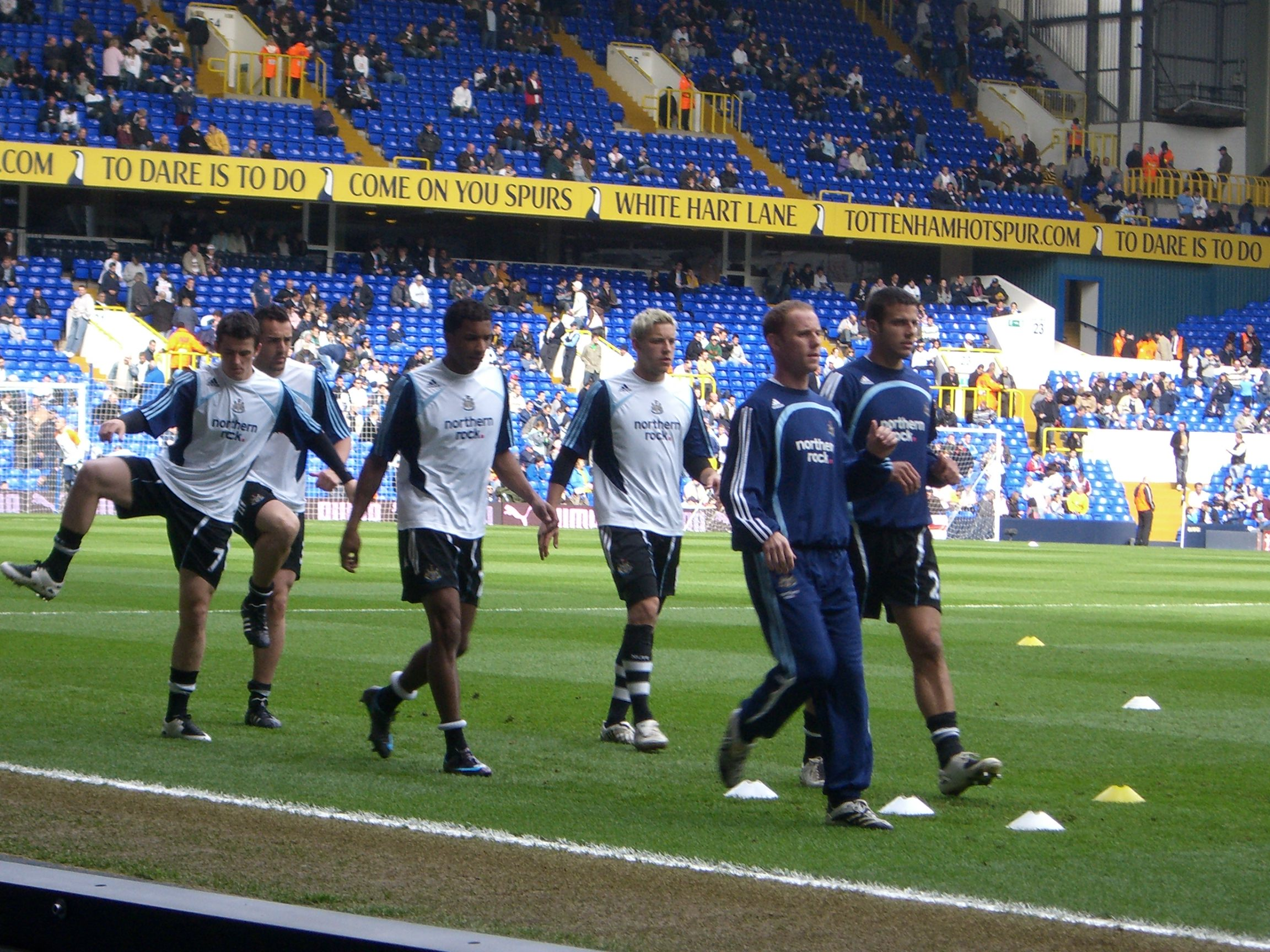
Newcastle United players warming up at White Hart Lane prior to a Premier League match against Tottenham Hotspur, 30 March 2008

Keegan's comeback initially did not live up to expectations, with a run of eight games without a win, an FA Cup exit and talk even of a relegation battle. March proved to be a turning point, and, following a change to an attacking line-up with Owen supporting Martins and Viduka up front, the team started to produce results in time for Keegan to maintain his perfect record in the Tyne-Wear derby with a 2–0 home win on 20 April, which put Newcastle's survival beyond all doubt and allowed Keegan to plan for his stated contract length of the next three seasons at the club. With a 2–2 away draw for the following game at West Ham United, the eight-game run of no wins had been turned into a seven-game unbeaten run with two games left to the end of the season. In the final table, Newcastle occupied 12th place on 43 points.

On 22 May, Habib Beye, signed by Allardyce at the start of the season, was named Newcastle's player of the season based on fan votes to a poll organised by the Evening Chronicle.

== Final league table ==
Pos	Team	Pld	W	D	L	GF	GA	GD	Pts	Qualification or relegation
10	West Ham United	38	13	10	15	42	50	−8	49	
11	Tottenham Hotspur	38	11	13	14	66	61	+5	46	Qualification for the UEFA Cup first round (Note: As League Cup winners)
12	Newcastle United	38	11	10	17	45	65	−20	43	
13	Middlesbrough	38	10	12	16	43	53	−10	42	
14	Wigan Athletic	38	10	10	18	34	51	−17	40	

Source: Barclays Premier League
Rules for classification: 1) points; 2) goal difference; 3) number of goals scored.
For further information on European qualification see Premier League – Competition

== Chronological list of events ==
- 7 June 2007: Mark Viduka was signed from Middlesbrough.
- 14 June 2007: Joey Barton was signed from Manchester City.
- 29 June 2007: Mike Ashley increased his stake in Newcastle United to 93.2%. David Rozehnal was signed from Paris Saint-Germain.
- 3 July 2007: Geremi Njitap was signed from Chelsea.
- 24 July 2007: Newcastle United deputy chairman Chris Mort replaced Freddy Shepherd as chairman of the club.
- 3 August 2007: Alan Smith was signed from Manchester United.
- 3 August 2007: Caçapa was signed from Lyon.
- 6 August 2007: José Enrique was signed from Villarreal.
- 31 August 2007: Abdoulaye Faye was signed from Bolton Wanderers.
- 31 August 2007: Habib Beye was signed from Marseille.
- 4 September 2007: Charles N'Zogbia signed a new five-year contract.
- 13 November 2007: Adam Sadler was appointed new reserve team manager.

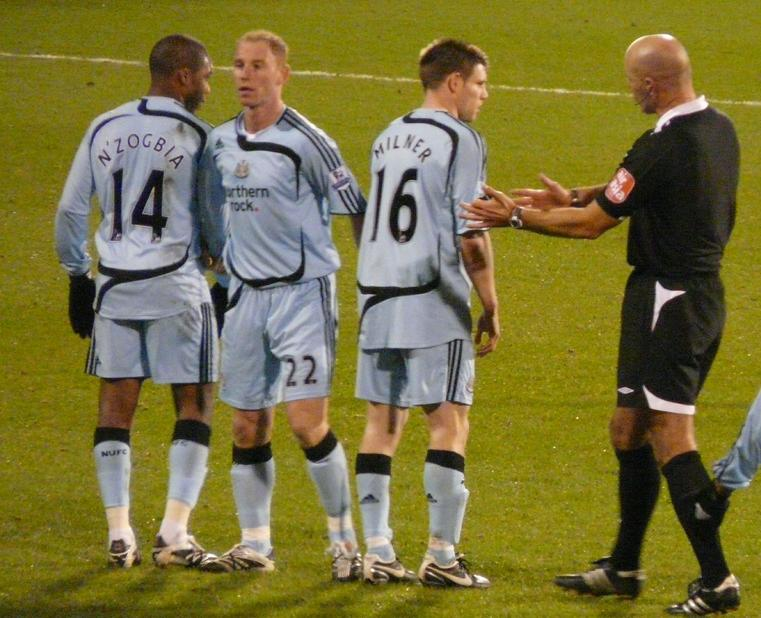
N'Zogbia, Butt and Milner in the wall at Fulham, December 2007

- 19 November 2007: Paul Barron was appointed new goalkeeping coach.
- 21 December 2007: Nicky Butt signed a new one-year contract.
- 7 January 2008: Ben Tozer was signed from Swindon Town.
- 8 January 2008: Wesley Ngo Baheng was signed from Le Havre.
- 9 January 2008: Sam Allardyce sacked as manager.
- 16 January 2008: Kevin Keegan hired as manager.
- 18 January 2008: Tamás Kádár was signed from Zalaegerszegi TE.
- 21 January 2008: Arthur Cox joined the coaching staff again as first team coach, reuniting with Keegan and McDermott.
- 29 January 2008: Dennis Wise was appointed as Executive Director or Football alongside Tony Jimenez as Vice President of Player Recruitment and Jeff Vetere as Technical Co-ordinator.
- 31 January 2008: Fabio Zamblera was signed from Atalanta B.C.; Ole Söderberg was signed from BK Häcken.
- 21 February 2008: David Henderson joined the coaching staff as physio from Hearts.
- 25 February 2008: Chris Hughton joined the coaching staff as first-team coach.
- 7 March 2008: Lamine Diatta was signed as a free agent.
- 21 March 2008: Lil Fuccillo was appointed chief scout.
- 5 April 2008: David Williamson was appointed Executive Director of Operations.

== Transfers ==
=== In ===
Date	Player	Previous club	Cost
7 June 2007	(Australia) Mark Viduka	(England) Middlesbrough	Free
14 June 2007	(England) Joey Barton	(England) Manchester City	£5,500,000
29 June 2007	(Czech Republic) David Rozehnal	(France) Paris Saint-Germain	£2,900,000
3 July 2007	(Cameroon) Geremi Njitap	(England) Chelsea	Free
3 August 2007	(England) Alan Smith	(England) Manchester United	£6,000,000
3 August 2007	(Brazil) Caçapa	(France) Lyon	Free
6 August 2007	(Spain) José Enrique	(Spain) Villarreal	£6,300,000
31 August 2007	(Senegal) Abdoulaye Faye	(England) Bolton Wanderers	Undisclosed
31 August 2007	(Senegal) Habib Beye	(France) Marseille	Undisclosed
7 January 2008	(England) Ben Tozer	(England) Swindon Town	Undisclosed
8 January 2008	(France) Wesley Ngo Baheng	(France) Le Havre	Undisclosed
18 January 2008	(Hungary) Tamás Kádár	(Hungary) Zalaegerszegi TE	£900,000
31 January 2008	(Italy) Fabio Zamblera	(Italy) Atalanta	Undisclosed
31 January 2008	(Sweden) Ole Söderberg	(Sweden) Häcken	Undisclosed
7 March 2008	(Senegal) Lamine Diatta	Free agent	Free

=== Out ===
Date	Player	New club	Cost
21 May 2007	(England) Titus Bramble	(England) Wigan Athletic	Free
21 May 2007	(Australia) Craig Moore	(Australia) Queensland Roar	Free
21 May 2007	(France) Olivier Bernard	Retired	Released
21 May 2007	(Czech Republic) Pavel Srníček	Retired	Released
21 May 2007	(France) Antoine Sibierski	(England) Wigan Athletic	Free
21 May 2007	(United States) Oguchi Onyewu	(Belgium) Standard Liège	Loan ended
6 June 2007	(England) Scott Parker	(England) West Ham United	£7,000,000
1 July 2007	(Republic of Ireland) Alan O'Brien	(Scotland) Hibernian	Undisclosed
3 August 2007	(Netherlands) Tim Krul	(Scotland) Falkirk	Loan (season)
14 August 2007	(England) Andy Carroll	(England) Preston North End	Loan (until 1 January 2008)
16 August 2007	(England) Kieron Dyer	(England) West Ham United	£6,000,000
25 August 2007	(Spain) Albert Luque	(Netherlands) Ajax	Undisclosed
31 August 2007	(England) Paul Huntington	(England) Leeds United	Undisclosed
31 August 2007	(Peru) Nolberto Solano	(England) West Ham United	Undisclosed
15 November 2007	(South Africa) Matty Pattison	(England) Norwich City	Loan (until 1 January 2008)
11 December 2007	(Nigeria) Celestine Babayaro	(United States) Los Angeles Galaxy	Released
4 January 2008	(South Africa) Matty Pattison	(England) Norwich City	Undisclosed
31 January 2008	(Czech Republic) David Rozehnal	(Italy) Lazio	Season loan
February 2008	(Nigeria) Shola Ameobi	(England) Stoke City	Season loan
6 May 2008	(Republic of Ireland) Stephen Carr	--	Released
6 May 2008	(Australia) James Troisi	--	Released
6 May 2008	(England) Peter Ramage	(England) Queens Park Rangers	Released
15 May 2008	(Senegal) Lamine Diatta	--	Released

== Players ==
=== First-team squad ===
Note: Flags indicate national team as defined under FIFA eligibility rules; some limited exceptions apply. Players may hold more than one non-FIFA nationality.

No.	Pos.	Nation	Player
1	GK	IRL	Shay Given
3	DF	ESP	José Enrique
4	DF	CZE	David Rozehnal
5	MF	TUR	Emre Belözoğlu
6	DF	BRA	Cláudio Caçapa
7	MF	ENG	Joey Barton
9	FW	NGR	Obafemi Martins
10	FW	ENG	Michael Owen
11	MF	IRL	Damien Duff
13	GK	ENG	Steve Harper
14	MF	FRA	Charles N'Zogbia
15	DF	SEN	Lamine Diatta
16	MF	ENG	James Milner

No.	Pos.	Nation	Player
17	FW	ENG	Alan Smith
20	DF	CMR	Geremi
21	DF	SEN	Habib Beye
22	MF	ENG	Nicky Butt
23	FW	ENG	Shola Ameobi
25	DF	SEN	Abdoulaye Faye
26	DF	ENG	Peter Ramage
27	DF	ENG	Steven Taylor
30	DF	CAN	David Edgar
35	DF	ENG	Ben Tozer
36	FW	AUS	Mark Viduka
38	MF	COD	Kazenga LuaLua
39	FW	ENG	Andy Carroll

=== Left club during season ===
Note: Flags indicate national team as defined under FIFA eligibility rules; some limited exceptions apply. Players may hold more than one non-FIFA nationality.

No.	Pos.	Nation	Player
2	DF	IRL	Stephen Carr (released)
8	MF	ENG	Kieron Dyer (to West Ham United)
15	MF	PER	Nolberto Solano (to West Ham United)
19	FW	ESP	Albert Luque (to Ajax)

No.	Pos.	Nation	Player
32	DF	ENG	Paul Huntington (to Leeds United)
33	DF	NGR	Celestine Babayaro (released)
35	MF	RSA	Matty Pattison (to Norwich City)
37	FW	AUS	James Troisi (released)

=== Reserve squad ===
Note: Flags indicate national team as defined under FIFA eligibility rules; some limited exceptions apply. Players may hold more than one non-FIFA nationality.

No.	Pos.	Nation	Player
34	GK	ENG	Fraser Forster
40	GK	NED	Tim Krul
—	GK	ENG	Mark Cook
—	GK	ENG	Dan Mullen
—	GK	ENG	Max Johnson
—	GK	SWE	Ole Söderberg
—	DF	ENG	Matthew Grieve
—	DF	ENG	Jeff Henderson
—	DF	ENG	Darren Lough
—	DF	ENG	James Taylor
—	DF	NIR	Shane Ferguson
—	DF	IRL	Callum Morris
—	DF	HUN	Tamás Kádár
—	MF	ENG	Mark Bertram
—	MF	ENG	Mark Doninger

No.	Pos.	Nation	Player
—	MF	ENG	Alex Francis
—	MF	ENG	Jonny Godsmark
—	MF	ENG	Callum Little
—	MF	ENG	Kieran Wrightson
—	MF	NIR	Paddy McLaughlin
—	FW	ENG	Campbell Bell
—	FW	ENG	Ryan Donaldson
—	FW	ENG	James Marwood
—	FW	ENG	Dan Neary
—	FW	NIR	Michael McCrudden
—	FW	FRA	Wesley Ngo Baheng
—	FW	ITA	Fabio Zamblera
—	FW	NED	Frank Wiafe Danquah
—		ENG	Stewart Bath

==== Left club during season ====
Note: Flags indicate national team as defined under FIFA eligibility rules; some limited exceptions apply. Players may hold more than one non-FIFA nationality.

No.	Pos.	Nation	Player
—	MF	ENG	Alex Patterson (to Eckerd Tritons)

=== Trialists ===
Note: Flags indicate national team as defined under FIFA eligibility rules; some limited exceptions apply. Players may hold more than one non-FIFA nationality.

No.	Pos.	Nation	Player
—	GK	ENG	Sam Filler (on trial from Bradford City)
—	DF	SVK	Tomáš Hanzel (on trial from Spartak Trnava)

No.	Pos.	Nation	Player
—	MF	RSA	Lance Davids (on trial from Djurgårdens IF)

== Match results ==
=== Pre-season ===
17 July 2007	Hartlepool United	1–3	Newcastle United	Hartlepool
19:30	Brown 49'		Ameobi 56', 72'; Owen 58'	Stadium: Victoria Park; Attendance: 6,030; Referee: C. Oliver

21 July 2007	Carlisle United	1–1	Newcastle United	Carlisle
15:00	Livesey 56'		Solano 90'	Stadium: Brunton Park; Attendance: 12,346; Referee: M. Pike

26 July 2007	Newcastle United	4–1	Celtic	Newcastle upon Tyne
19:45	Martins 11'; Luque 30', 42'; Milner 90'		Brown 72'	Stadium: St James' Park; Attendance: 30,225; Referee: Mark Halsey

29 July 2007	Newcastle United	2–0	Juventus	Newcastle upon Tyne
15:00	Luque 9' (pen.); Carroll 36'			Stadium: St James' Park; Attendance: 34,016; Referee: Mark Clattenburg

1 August 2007	Hull City	1–0	Newcastle United	Hull
19:45	Hughes 56'			Stadium: KC Stadium; Attendance: 14,000; Referee: Darren Drysdale

5 August 2007	Newcastle United	1–0	Sampdoria	Newcastle upon Tyne
15:00	Smith 59'			Stadium: St James' Park; Attendance: 23,078; Referee: Andre Marriner

=== Premier League ===
==== Results summary ====
Overall								Home						Away					
Pld	W	D	L	GF	GA	GD	Pts	W	D	L	GF	GA	GD	W	D	L	GF	GA	GD
38	11	10	17	45	65	−20	43	8	5	6	25	26	−1	3	5	11	20	39	−19

==== Results per matchday ====
Matchday	1	2	3	4	5	6	7	8	9	10	11	12	13	14	15	16	17	18	19	20	21	22	23	24	25	26	27	28	29	30	31	32	33	34	35	36	37	38
Ground	A	H	A	H	A	H	A	H	H	A	H	A	H	A	H	H	A	H	A	A	H	A	H	A	H	A	H	H	A	A	H	A	H	A	H	A	H	A
Result	W	D	D	W	L	W	L	W	W	L	L	D	L	L	D	W	W	D	L	L	L	L	D	L	D	L	L	L	L	D	W	W	W	D	W	D	L	L
Position	1	6	7	5	10	5	8	9	8	8	10	11	11	11	11	10	10	9	11	11	11	11	12	12	12	13	13	13	14	14	13	12	12	12	12	12	12	12

A = Away; H = Home; W = Win; D = Draw; L = Loss

11 August 2007 1	Bolton Wanderers	1–3	Newcastle United	Bolton
15:00	Anelka 50'	Report	N'Zogbia 11'; Martins 21', 27'	Stadium: Reebok Stadium; Attendance: 25,414; Referee: Chris Foy

18 August 2007 2	Newcastle United	0–0	Aston Villa	Newcastle upon Tyne
17:15		Report		Stadium: St James' Park; Attendance: 51,049; Referee: Howard Webb

26 August 2007 3	Middlesbrough	2–2	Newcastle United	Middlesbrough
13:30	Mido 28'; Arca 80'	Report	N'Zogbia 22'; Viduka 77'	Stadium: Riverside Stadium; Attendance: 28,875; Referee: Mike Dean

1 September 2007 4	Newcastle United	1–0	Wigan Athletic	Newcastle upon Tyne
15:00	Owen 87'	Report	Kilbane (yellow card) 46' (red card)	Stadium: St James' Park; Attendance: 50,461; Referee: Steve Bennett

17 September 2007 5	Derby County	1–0	Newcastle United	Derby
19:45	Miller 39'	Report		Stadium: Pride Park Stadium; Attendance: 30,016; Referee: Peter Walton

23 September 2007 6	Newcastle United	3–1	West Ham United	Newcastle upon Tyne
13:30	Viduka 2', 41'; N'Zogbia 76'	Report	Ashton 32'	Stadium: St James' Park; Attendance: 50,104; Referee: Mike Riley

29 September 2007 7	Manchester City	3–1	Newcastle United	Manchester
12:45	Petrov 38'; Mpenza 47'; Elano 87'	Report	Martins 29'	Stadium: City of Manchester Stadium; Attendance: 40,606; Referee: Chris Foy

7 October 2007 8	Newcastle United	3–2	Everton	Newcastle upon Tyne
15:00	Butt 42'; Emre 86'; Owen 90'	Report	Johnson 53'; Given 90+2' (o.g.)	Stadium: St James' Park; Attendance: 50,152; Referee: Martin Atkinson

22 October 2007 9	Newcastle United	3–1	Tottenham Hotspur	Newcastle upon Tyne
20:00	Martins 44'; Caçapa 49'; Milner 72'	Report	Keane 57'	Stadium: St James' Park; Attendance: 51,411; Referee: Steve Bennett

27 October 2007 10	Reading	2–1	Newcastle United	Reading
15:00	Kitson 53'; Long 84'	Report	Duberry 74' (o.g.)	Stadium: Madejski Stadium; Attendance: 24,119; Referee: Phil Dowd

3 November 2007 11	Newcastle United	1–4	Portsmouth	Newcastle upon Tyne
15:00	Campbell 16' (o.g.)	Report	Pamarot 8'; Benjani 9'; Utaka 11'; Kranjčar 71'	Stadium: St James' Park; Attendance: 51,490; Referee: Chris Foy

10 November 2007 12	Sunderland	1–1	Newcastle United	Sunderland
12:45	Higginbotham 52'	Report	Milner 65'	Stadium: Stadium of Light; Attendance: 47,701; Referee: Martin Atkinson

24 November 2007 13	Newcastle United	0–3	Liverpool	Newcastle upon Tyne
12:45		Report	Gerrard 28'; Kuyt 46'; Babel 66'	Stadium: St James' Park; Attendance: 52,307; Referee: Alan Wiley

1 December 2007 14	Blackburn Rovers	3–1	Newcastle United	Blackburn
15:00	Bentley 54', 67'; Tugay 90+2'	Report	Martins 45'	Stadium: Ewood Park; Attendance: 27,477; Referee: Rob Styles

5 December 2007 15	Newcastle United	1–1	Arsenal	Newcastle upon Tyne
19:45	Taylor 60'	Report	Adebayor 4'	Stadium: St James' Park; Attendance: 50,305; Referee: Mike Dean

8 December 2007 16	Newcastle United	2–1	Birmingham City	Newcastle upon Tyne
15:00	Martins 45' (pen.), Beye 90'	Report	Jerome 9'	Stadium: St James' Park; Attendance: 49,948; Referee: Rob Styles

15 December 2007 17	Fulham	0–1	Newcastle United	London
17:15		Report	Barton 90' (pen.)	Stadium: Craven Cottage; Attendance: 24,959; Referee: Howard Webb

23 December 2007 18	Newcastle United	2–2	Derby County	Newcastle upon Tyne
14:00	Viduka 27', 87'	Report	Barnes 6'; Miller 52'	Stadium: St James' Park; Attendance: 51,386; Referee: Andre Marriner

26 December 2007 19	Wigan Athletic	1–0	Newcastle United	Wigan
15:00	Taylor 65'	Report		Stadium: JJB Stadium; Attendance: 20,204; Referee: Mike Dean

29 December 2007 20	Chelsea	2–1	Newcastle United	London
15:00	Essien 29'; Kalou 87'	Report	Butt 56'	Stadium: Stamford Bridge; Attendance: 41,751; Referee: Mike Riley

2 January 2008 21	Newcastle United	0–2	Manchester City	Newcastle upon Tyne
19:45		Report	Elano 38'; Fernandes 76'	Stadium: St James' Park; Attendance: 50,956; Referee: Martin Atkinson

12 January 2008 22	Manchester United	6–0	Newcastle United	Manchester
17:15	Ronaldo 49', 70', 88'; Tevez 55', 90'; Ferdinand 85'	Report		Stadium: Old Trafford; Attendance: 75,965; Referee: Rob Styles

19 January 2008 23	Newcastle United	0–0	Bolton Wanderers	Newcastle upon Tyne
17:15		Report		Stadium: St James' Park; Attendance: 52,250; Referee: Alan Wiley

29 January 2008 24	Arsenal	3–0	Newcastle United	London
19:45	Adebayor 40'; Flamini 72'; Fàbregas 80'	Report		Stadium: Emirates Stadium; Attendance: 60,127; Referee: Mike Riley

3 February 2008 25	Newcastle United	1–1	Middlesbrough	Newcastle upon Tyne
13:30	Owen 60'	Report	Huth 87'	Stadium: St James' Park; Attendance: 51,105; Referee: Mike Dean

9 February 2008 26	Aston Villa	4–1	Newcastle United	Birmingham
12:45	Bouma 48'; Carew 51', 72', 90' (pen.)	Report	Owen 4'	Stadium: Villa Park; Attendance: 42,640; Referee: Lee Mason

23 February 2008 27	Newcastle United	1–5	Manchester United	Newcastle upon Tyne
17:15	Faye 79'	Report	Rooney 25', 80'; Ronaldo 45', 56'; Saha 90'	Stadium: St James' Park; Attendance: 52,291; Referee: Chris Foy

1 March 2008 28	Newcastle United	0–1	Blackburn Rovers	Newcastle upon Tyne
15:00		Report	Derbyshire 90'	Stadium: St James' Park; Attendance: 50,796; Referee: Rob Styles

8 March 2008 29	Liverpool	3–0	Newcastle United	Liverpool
15:00	Pennant 43'; Torres 45'; Gerrard 51'	Report		Stadium: Anfield; Attendance: 44,031; Referee: Peter Walton

17 March 2008 30	Birmingham City	1–1	Newcastle United	Birmingham
20:00	McFadden 33'	Report	Owen 56'	Stadium: St Andrew's; Attendance: 25,777; Referee: Howard Webb

22 March 2008 31	Newcastle United	2–0	Fulham	Newcastle upon Tyne
15:00	Viduka 6'; Owen 82'	Report		Stadium: St James' Park; Attendance: 52,293; Referee: Alan Wiley

30 March 2008 32	Tottenham Hotspur	1–4	Newcastle United	London
15:00	Bent 26'	Report	Butt 45'; Geremi 52'; Owen 65'; Martins 83'	Stadium: White Hart Lane; Attendance: 36,067; Referee: Steve Bennett

5 April 2008 33	Newcastle United	3–0	Reading	Newcastle upon Tyne
15:00	Martins 18'; Owen 43'; Viduka 58'	Report		Stadium: St James' Park; Attendance: 52,179; Referee: Lee Probert

12 April 2008 34	Portsmouth	0–0	Newcastle United	Portsmouth
17:15		Report		Stadium: Fratton Park; Attendance: 20,507; Referee: Phil Dowd

20 April 2008 35	Newcastle United	2–0	Sunderland	Newcastle upon Tyne
13:30	Owen 4', 45' (pen.)	Report		Stadium: St James' Park; Attendance: 52,305; Referee: Mike Dean

26 April 2008 36	West Ham United	2–2	Newcastle United	London
15:00	Noble 10'; Ashton 23'	Report	Martins 42'; McCartney 45' (o.g.)	Stadium: Boleyn Ground; Attendance: 34,980; Referee: Uriah Rennie

5 May 2008 37	Newcastle United	0–2	Chelsea	Newcastle upon Tyne
16:00		Report	Ballack 61'; Malouda 82'	Stadium: St James' Park; Attendance: 52,305; Referee: Steve Bennett

11 May 2008 38	Everton	3–1	Newcastle United	Liverpool
15:00	Yakubu 28', 82' (pen.); Lescott 70'	Report	Owen 47' (pen.)	Stadium: Goodison Park; Attendance: 39, 592; Referee: Peter Walton

Last updated: 7 May 2008

=== FA Cup ===
6 January 2008 Round 3	Stoke City	0–0	Newcastle United	Stoke-on-Trent
		Report		Stadium: Britannia Stadium; Attendance: 22,861; Referee: Steve Bennett

16 January 2008 Round 3R	Newcastle United	4–1	Stoke City	Newcastle upon Tyne
	Owen 8'; Emre (red card) 29'; Caçapa 31'; Milner 68'; Duff 76'		Lawrence 89'	Stadium: St James' Park; Attendance: 35,108; Referee: Uriah Rennie

26 January 2008 Round 4	Arsenal	3–0	Newcastle United	London
	Adebayor 51', 83'; Butt 89' (o.g.)			Stadium: Emirates Stadium; Attendance: 60,046; Referee: Martin Atkinson

=== League Cup ===
29 August 2007 Round 2	Newcastle United	2–0	Barnsley	Newcastle upon Tyne
	Owen 57'; Martins 86'	[news.bbc.co.uk/sport2/hi/football/league_cup/6963530.stm Report]		Stadium: St James' Park; Attendance: 30,523; Referee: Graham Salisbury

25 September 2007 Round 3	Arsenal	2–0	Newcastle United	London
	Bendtner 83'; Denílson 89'	Report		Stadium: Emirates Stadium; Attendance: 60,004; Referee: Howard Webb

== Player statistics ==
=== Appearances and goals ===
No.	Pos	Nat	Player	Total		Premier League		FA Cup		League Cup	
No.	Pos	Nat	Player	Apps	Goals	Apps	Goals	Apps	Goals	Apps	Goals
Goalkeepers
1	GK	(Republic of Ireland) IRL	Shay Given	24	0	19	0	3	0	2	0
13	GK	(England) ENG	Steve Harper	21	0	19+2	0	0	0	0	0
Defenders
2	DF	(Republic of Ireland) IRL	Stephen Carr	12	0	8+2	0	2	0	0	0
3	DF	(Spain) ESP	Jose Enrique	28	0	18+5	0	3	0	2	0
4	DF	(Czech Republic) CZE	David Rozehnal	25	0	16+5	0	1+2	0	1	0
6	DF	(Brazil) BRA	Caçapa	22	2	16+3	1	2	1	1	0
14	DF	(France) FRA	Charles N'Zogbia	37	3	27+5	3	3	0	2	0
15	DF	(Senegal) SEN	Lamine Diatta	2	0	0+2	0	0	0	0	0
21	DF	(Senegal) SEN	Habib Beye	30	1	27+2	1	0	0	1	0
25	DF	(Senegal) SEN	Abdoulaye Faye	25	1	20+2	1	1	0	2	0
26	DF	(England) ENG	Peter Ramage	3	0	0+3	0	0	0	0	0
27	DF	(England) ENG	Steven Taylor	36	1	29+2	1	3	0	2	0
30	DF	(Canada) CAN	David Edgar	6	0	2+3	0	0	0	0+1	0
Midfielders
5	MF	(Turkey) TUR	Emre Belözoğlu	17	1	6+8	1	1	0	1+1	0
7	MF	(England) ENG	Joey Barton	23	1	20+3	1	0	0	0	0
11	MF	(Republic of Ireland) IRL	Damien Duff	19	1	12+4	0	3	1	0	0
16	MF	(England) ENG	James Milner	32	3	25+4	2	2	1	1	0
20	MF	(Cameroon) CMR	Geremi	28	1	24+3	1	0	0	1	0
22	MF	(England) ENG	Nicky Butt	39	3	35	3	2	0	0+2	0
38	MF	(Democratic Republic of the Congo) COD	Kazenga LuaLua	5	0	0+2	0	0+3	0	0	0
Forwards
9	FW	(Nigeria) NGR	Obafemi Martins	33	10	23+8	9	0	0	1+1	1
10	FW	(England) ENG	Michael Owen	33	13	24+5	11	3	1	1	1
17	FW	(England) ENG	Alan Smith	37	0	26+7	0	2	0	2	0
23	FW	(England) ENG	Shola Ameobi	8	0	2+4	0	0	0	2	0
36	FW	(Australia) AUS	Mark Viduka	28	7	19+7	7	2	0	0	0
39	FW	(England) ENG	Andy Carroll	6	0	1+3	0	0+2	0	0	0
Players transferred out during the season
15	MF	(Peru) PER	Nolberto Solano	2	0	0+1	0	0	0	1	0

Last updated: 19 May 2008
Source: Competitions

=== Coaching staff ===
Position	Staff
Manager	(England) Kevin Keegan
Assistant Manager	(England) Terry McDermott
First Team coach	(England) Lee Clark
Goalkeeping Coach	(England) Andy Woodman
Development Coach	(England) John Carver
Reserve Team Coach	(Scotland) Steve Clarke
Chief scout	(England) Arthur Cox

Last updated: 3 May 2011
