= 2006–07 Newcastle United F.C. season =

Newcastle United
2006–07 season
- Chairman: Freddy Shepherd
- Manager: Glenn Roeder (until 6 May 2007); Nigel Pearson (6–15 May 2007); Sam Allardyce (from 15 May 2007)
- Stadium: St. James' Park
- FA Premier League: 13th
- FA Cup: Third round
- League Cup: Quarter-finals
- UEFA Intertoto Cup: Winners
- UEFA Cup: Round of 16
- Top goalscorer: League: Obafemi Martins (11); All: Obafemi Martins (17)
- Highest home attendance: 52,305 (vs. Liverpool)
- Lowest home attendance: 48,145 (vs. Bolton Wanderers)
Home colours	Away colours	Third colours

During the 2006–07 season, Newcastle United participated in the Premier League, finishing 13th, and also competed in the 2006–07 UEFA Cup and won the 2006 Intertoto Cup.

== Season summary ==
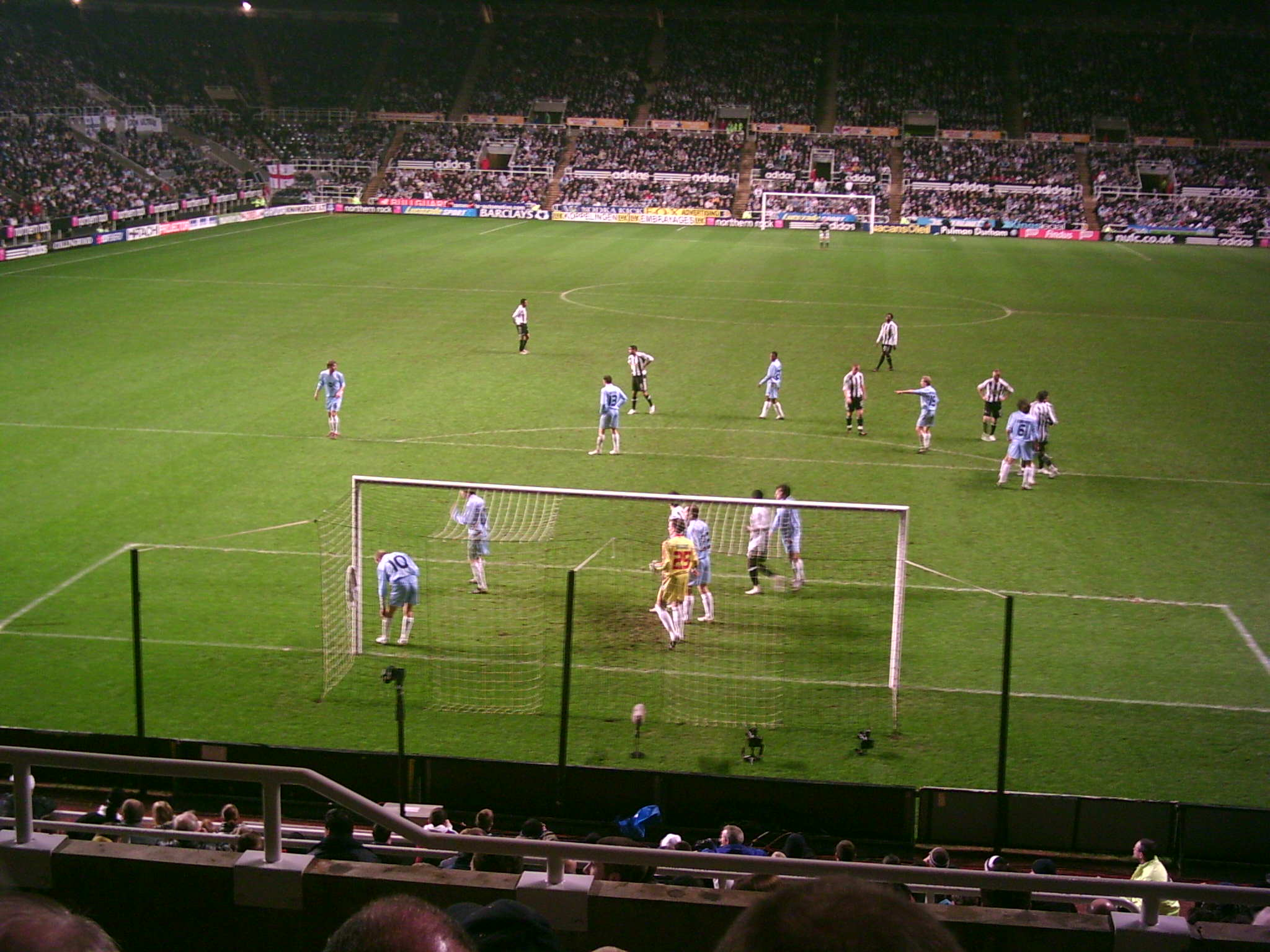
Newcastle United against Zulte Waregem, 22 February 2007.

The summer transfer window saw Roeder sign Obafemi Martins from Inter Milan and Damien Duff from Chelsea, though he failed to follow up the club's interest in signing Sol Campbell, claiming he wanted younger players, and unsuccessful attempts were made to lure strikers Dirk Kuyt and Eiður Guðjohnsen to the club. As the transfer window closed Antoine Sibierski was signed from Manchester City, and young Manchester United striker Giuseppe Rossi was signed on a four-month loan. Roeder controversially made a last-minute withdrawal from the sale of winger James Milner to Aston Villa, to the fury of Villa manager Martin O'Neill.

A poor opening run of only two wins in the opening thirteen league outings saw Newcastle in deep problems at the wrong end of the table, with the team suffering from the worst injury crisis in the club's history, forcing Roeder to recruit players from the youth academy, notably David Edgar and Matty Pattison. Fan protestations against the club's board came following a mid-November defeat against Sheffield United with the club staring relegation in the face.

The return of senior players saw the club fight back up the league, but a 5–1 FA Cup hammering at home to Championship side Birmingham City left fans and players stunned. A UEFA Cup campaign following success in the Intertoto Cup had looked like the club's form of salvation, but the team crashed out to an agonising defeat on away goals at AZ Alkmaar. Following that the team ran out of steam, and manager Glenn Roeder resigned the week before the end of the season with the team left in mid-table obscurity. Things, however, did seem to look up with new manager Sam Allardyce and wealthy new owners confirmed in the off season.

=== New ownership and Sam Allardyce ===
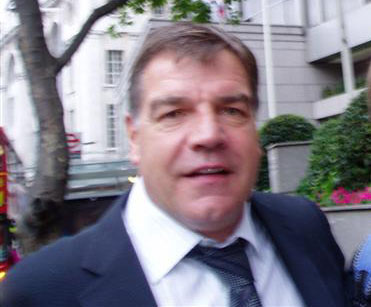
Sam Allardyce

Billionaire businessman Mike Ashley began his quest to purchase Newcastle in the spring of 2007, successfully acquiring Sir John Hall's majority stake in the club. Chairman Freddie Shepherd remained defiant that he was not going to sell the club, and, despite a takeover being inevitable, appointed Sam Allardyce as manager following his departure from Bolton Wanderers in April. However, following Mike Ashley claiming a further majority stake hold, Shepherd was forced to sell his stake to Ashley and end his ten-year tenure as chairman. Ashley brought in lawyer Chris Mort as chairman, Tony Jimenez as vice-chairman and Derek Llambias as managing director.

== Final league table ==
Pos	Team	Pld	W	D	L	GF	GA	GD	Pts
11	Aston Villa	38	11	17	10	43	41	+2	50
12	Middlesbrough	38	12	10	16	44	49	−5	46
13	Newcastle United	38	11	10	17	38	47	−9	43
14	Manchester City	38	11	9	18	29	44	−15	42
15	West Ham United	38	12	5	21	35	59	−24	41

Source: Barclays Premier League
Rules for classification: 1) points; 2) goal difference; 3) number of goals scored.

== Chronological list of events ==
- 14 June 2006: Scott Parker named as Newcastle United captain following the retirement of Alan Shearer.
- 23 June 2006: Damien Duff signed from Chelsea.
- 18 July 2006: Joe Joyce appointed new Academy Manager.
- 24 August 2006: Obafemi Martins signed from Inter Milan.
- 30 August 2006: Giuseppe Rossi signed on a four-month loan from Manchester United.
- 30 August 2006: Antoine Sibierski signed from Manchester City.
- 1 September 2006: Olivier Bernard signed after being released by Rangers earlier in the summer.
- 26 September 2006: Newcastle United terminate the contract of assistant manager Kevin Bond.
- 29 September 2006: Pavel Srníček signed after being released by Beira-Mar in the summer.
- 22 October 2006: Nigel Pearson appointed as assistant manager.
- 4 November 2006: A section of Newcastle supporters stage a protest after 1–0 defeat to Sheffield United. Many call for the resignation of chairman Freddy Shepherd and other members of the board.
- 14 November 2006: Paul Winsper resigns as fitness coach.
- 16 December 2006: Newcastle United named overall winners of the Intertoto Cup.
- 12 January 2007: Emre charged by The Football Association with using racially aggravated abusive and/or insulting words during the match with Everton.
- 30 January 2007: Oguchi Onyewu signed on a four-month loan from Standard Liège.
- 19 March 2007: Allegations of Emre using racially aggravated abusive and/or insulting words during the match with Everton are found not proven by the FA.
- 2 April 2007: Newcastle United unveil plans for a new £300 million development that would increase the capacity of the stadium to at least 60,000.
- 30 April 2007: Michael Owen appears in a match for Newcastle United following a 10-month absence through injury.
- 6 May 2007: Glenn Roeder resigns as manager.
- 6 May 2007: Nigel Pearson named as caretaker manager.
- 13 May 2007: Newcastle United's season came to an end following a 1–1 Premiership draw away to bottom-placed Watford.
- 15 May 2007: Sam Allardyce appointed as manager.
- 21 May 2007: Sam Allardyce releases six players from Newcastle United's squad, including Craig Moore, Titus Bramble and Antoine Sibierski.
- 23 May 2007: Businessman Mike Ashley becomes the largest shareholder in Newcastle United after buying Sir John Hall's 41.6% share for £55 million. He then launched a formal takeover bid.

== Team kit ==
The team kit for the 2006–07 season was produced by Adidas and the main shirt sponsor was Northern Rock.

== Transfers ==
=== In ===
Date	Player	Previous club	Cost
23 June 2006	(Republic of Ireland) Damien Duff	(England) Chelsea	£5 million
24 August 2006	(Nigeria) Obafemi Martins	(Italy) Internazionale	£10.14 million
31 August 2006	(Italy) Giuseppe Rossi	(England) Manchester United	Loan
31 August 2006	(France) Antoine Sibierski	(England) Manchester City	Undisclosed
1 September 2006	(France) Olivier Bernard	(Scotland) Rangers	Free
29 September 2006	(Czech Republic) Pavel Srníček	(Portugal) Beira-Mar	Free
30 January 2007	(United States) Oguchi Onyewu	(Belgium) Standard Liège	Loan

=== Out ===
Date	Player	New club	Cost
1 June 2006	(Northern Ireland) Daryl Smylie	(Scotland) Livingston	Free
8 June 2006	(England) Lee Bowyer	(England) West Ham United	Undisclosed
14 June 2006	(England) Michael Chopra	(Wales) Cardiff City	£500,000
8 July 2006	(England) Robbie Elliott	(England) Sunderland	Free
8 August 2006	(Senegal) Amdy Faye	(England) Charlton Athletic	£2,000,000
22 August 2006	(France) Jean-Alain Boumsong	(Italy) Juventus	£3,300,000
18 January 2007	(England) Liam Atkin	(England) Carlisle United	Free
30 January 2007	(England) Carl Finnigan	(Scotland) Falkirk	Free

== Players ==
=== First-team squad ===
All players in the Newcastle United squad during the 2006–07 season

Note: Flags indicate national team as defined under FIFA eligibility rules; some limited exceptions apply. Players may hold more than one non-FIFA nationality.

No.	Pos.	Nation	Player
1	GK	IRL	Shay Given (vice captain)
2	DF	IRL	Stephen Carr
4	MF	PER	Nolberto Solano
5	MF	TUR	Emre Belözoğlu
7	FW	ESP	Albert Luque
8	MF	ENG	Kieron Dyer
9	FW	NGA	Obafemi Martins
10	FW	ENG	Michael Owen
11	MF	IRL	Damien Duff
12	GK	ENG	Steve Harper
14	MF	FRA	Charles N'Zogbia
15	DF	USA	Oguchi Onyewu
16	MF	ENG	James Milner
17	MF	ENG	Scott Parker (captain)
18	DF	AUS	Craig Moore
19	DF	ENG	Titus Bramble
20	FW	FRA	Antoine Sibierski

No.	Pos.	Nation	Player
21	MF	ENG	Lee Clark
22	MF	ENG	Nicky Butt
23	FW	ENG	Shola Ameobi
24	GK	CZE	Pavel Srníček
26	DF	ENG	Peter Ramage
27	DF	ENG	Steven Taylor
30	DF	CAN	David Edgar
32	DF	ENG	Paul Huntington
33	DF	NGA	Celestine Babayaro
34	DF	FRA	Olivier Bernard
35	MF	RSA	Matty Pattison
37	MF	IRL	Alan O'Brien
39	FW	ENG	Andy Carroll
40	GK	NED	Tim Krul
42	MF	AUS	James Troisi
43	MF	COD	Kazenga LuaLua
49	GK	ENG	Fraser Forster

=== Left club during season ===
Note: Flags indicate national team as defined under FIFA eligibility rules; some limited exceptions apply. Players may hold more than one non-FIFA nationality.

No. / Pos. / Nation / Player; 6 / DF / FRA / Jean-Alain Boumsong (to Juventus)	No. / Pos. / Nation / Player; 15 / FW / ITA / Giuseppe Rossi (on loan from Manchester United)

=== Reserve squad ===
The following players made most of their appearances for the reserve team this season, and did not appear in a first-team squad this season.

Note: Flags indicate national team as defined under FIFA eligibility rules; some limited exceptions apply. Players may hold more than one non-FIFA nationality.

No.	Pos.	Nation	Player
36	DF	ENG	Kris Gate
—	DF	ENG	Phil Cave
—	DF	ENG	Chris Shanks

No.	Pos.	Nation	Player
—	MF	ENG	Kieran Wrightson
—	FW	ENG	Carl Finnigan

==== Left club during season ====
Note: Flags indicate national team as defined under FIFA eligibility rules; some limited exceptions apply. Players may hold more than one non-FIFA nationality.

No.	Pos.	Nation	Player
—	DF	ENG	Liam Atkin (to Carlisle United)

=== Under-18 squad ===
The following players made most of their appearances for the under-18 team this season, but may have also appeared for the reserves.

Note: Flags indicate national team as defined under FIFA eligibility rules; some limited exceptions apply. Players may hold more than one non-FIFA nationality.

No.	Pos.	Nation	Player
—	GK	ENG	Mark Cook
—	DF	ENG	Paul Dummett
—	DF	ENG	Matthew Grieve
—	DF	ENG	Daniel Leadbitter
—	DF	ENG	Darren Lough
—	DF	ENG	James Tavernier
—	DF	ENG	James Taylor
—	DF	IRL	Callum Morris
—	MF	ENG	Stewart Bath
—	MF	ENG	Mark Bertram
—	MF	ENG	Rob Cavener
—	MF	ENG	Dean Critchlow
—	MF	ENG	Mark Doninger
—	MF	ENG	Alex Francis
—	MF	ENG	Jonny Godsmark
—	MF	ENG	Callum Little

No.	Pos.	Nation	Player
—	MF	ENG	Greg McDermott
—	MF	ENG	Alex Patterson
—	MF	ENG	Glenn Reay
—	FW	ENG	Phil Airey
—	FW	ENG	Campbell Bell
—	FW	ENG	Ryan Donaldson
—	FW	ENG	James Marwood
—	FW	NED	Frank Wiafe Danquah
—	GK		Tom Kindley
—	DF		Ross Cowan
—			Liam Davidson
—			James Debbage
—			Tom Kilton
—			Lewis Marr
—			Ben Williamson

=== Trialists ===
Note: Flags indicate national team as defined under FIFA eligibility rules; some limited exceptions apply. Players may hold more than one non-FIFA nationality.

No.	Pos.	Nation	Player
—	DF	ENG	Michael Morrison (on trial from Cambridge United)
—	DF	TUR	Erol Bulut (on trial from Olympiacos)
—	DF	EGY	Wael Gomaa (on trial from Al Ahly)
—	MF	SCO	David Templeton (on trial from Stenhousemuir)

No.	Pos.	Nation	Player
—	FW	ENG	Lee Kerr (on trial from Whitley Bay)
—	FW	FRA	Garra Dembélé
—	FW	CMR	Pierre Boya (on trial from Partizan)

== Match results ==
=== Friendlies ===
Date	Opponent	Venue	Result	Attendance	Scorers
26 July 2006	Norwich City	Away	Won 1–2	15,205	Ramage, N'Zogbia
29 July 2006	PSV Eindhoven	Home	Lost 2–3	20,185	Ameobi, Luque
5 August 2006	Villarreal	Home	Drew 3–3	20,144	Ameobi, Butt (2)

=== Premier League ===
Results by round

Round	1	2	3	4	5	6	7	8	9	10	11	12	13	14	15	16	17	18	19	20	21	22	23	24	25	26	27	28	29	30	31	32	33	34	35	36	37	38
Ground	H	A	A	H	A	H	A	H	A	H	H	A	A	H	H	A	A	H	H	A	A	H	A	H	H	A	H	A	H	A	H	A	H	A	H	A	H	A
Result	W	L	L	L	W	D	L	L	L	D	L	D	D	W	W	L	W	W	W	L	L	D	W	D	W	L	W	L	D	L	L	W	D	L	D	L	L	D
Position	8	13	16	17	11	12	13	15	16	17	19	18	17	16	14	15	14	13	11	11	13	14	11	12	10	11	9	11	11	11	11	10	10	12	12	12	13	13

Source: World Football: Premier League 2006/2007 results
A = Away; H = Home; W = Win; D = Draw; L = Loss

Date	Opponent	Venue	Result	Attendance	Scorers
19 August 2006	Wigan Athletic	Home	2–1	51,569	Parker (38), Ameobi (64)
27 August 2006	Aston Villa	Away	2–0	35,141	
9 September 2006	Fulham	Home	1–2	50,365	Parker (54)
17 September 2006	West Ham United	Away	0–2	34,938	Duff (50), Martins (75)
20 September 2006	Liverpool	Away	2–0	43,754	
24 September 2006	Everton	Home	1–1	50,107	Ameobi (14)
1 October 2006	Manchester United	Away	2–0	75,664	
15 October 2006	Bolton Wanderers	Home	1–2	48,145	Ameobi (19 pen.)
22 October 2006	Middlesbrough	Away	1–0	30,060	
28 October 2006	Charlton Athletic	Home	0–0	48,642	
4 November 2006	Sheffield United	Home	0–1	50,188	
11 November 2006	Manchester City	Away	0–0	40,571	
18 November 2006	Arsenal	Away	1–1	60,058	Dyer (30)
26 November 2006	Portsmouth	Home	1–0	48,743	Sibierski (69)
6 December 2006	Reading	Home	3–2	48,182	Sibierski (23), Martins (57 pen.), Emre (84)
9 December 2006	Blackburn Rovers	Away	1–3	19,225	Martins (31, 90), Taylor (35)
13 December 2006	Chelsea	Away	1–0	41,945	
16 December 2006	Watford	Home	2–1	49,231	Martins (49, 85)
23 December 2006	Tottenham Hotspur	Home	3–1	52,079	Dyer (3), Martins (7), Parker (34)
26 December 2006	Bolton Wanderers	Away	2–1	26,437	Dyer (8)
30 December 2006	Everton	Away	3–0	38,682	
1 January 2007	Manchester United	Home	2–2	52,302	Milner (33), Edgar (74)
14 January 2007	Tottenham Hotspur	Away	2–3	35,942	Huntington (16), Martins (72), Butt (73)
20 January 2007	West Ham United	Home	2–2	52,095	Milner (45), Solano (53 pen.)
31 January 2007	Aston Villa	Home	3–1	49,201	Milner (5), Dyer (7), Sibierski (90)
3 February 2007	Fulham	Away	2–1	24,340	Martins (90)
10 February 2007	Liverpool	Home	2–1	52,305	Martins (26), Solano (70 pen.)
25 February 2007	Wigan Athletic	Away	1–0	21,179	
3 March 2007	Middlesbrough	Home	0–0	52,303	
27 January 2007	Charlton Athletic	Away	2–0	27,028	
31 March 2007	Manchester City	Home	0–1	52,004	
7 April 2007	Sheffield United	Away	1–2	32,572	Martins (17), Taylor (80)
9 April 2007	Arsenal	Home	0–0	52,293	
14 April 2007	Portsmouth	Away	2–1	20,165	Emre (69 pen.)
22 April 2007	Chelsea	Home	0–0	52,056	
30 April 2007	Reading	Away	1–0	24,109	
5 May 2007	Blackburn Rovers	Home	0–2	51,226	
13 May 2007	Watford	Away	1–1	19,830	Dyer (29)

=== Intertoto Cup ===
Round	Date	Opponent	Venue	Result	Attendance	Scorers
Third round 1st leg	15 July 2006	Lillestrøm	Home	1–1	31,059	Luque
Third round 2nd leg	22 July 2006	Lillestrøm	Away	0–3	8,742	Ameobi (2), Emre

=== UEFA Cup ===
Round	Date	Opponent	Venue	Result	Attendance	Scorers
Second qualifying round, 1st leg	10 August 2006	FK Ventspils	Away	0–1	6,000	Bramble
Second qualifying round, 2nd leg	24 August 2006	FK Ventspils	Home	0–0	30,498	
First round, 1st leg	14 September 2006	Levadia Tallinn	Away	0–1	7,917	Sibierski
First round, 2nd leg	28 September 2006	Levadia Tallinn	Home	2–1	27,012	Martins (2)
Group H	19 October 2006	Fenerbahçe	Home	1–0	30,035	Sibierski
Group H	2 November 2006	Palermo	Away	0–1	16,904	Luque
Group H	23 November 2006	Celta Vigo	Home	2–1	25,079	Sibierski, Taylor
Group H	30 November 2006	Eintracht Frankfurt	Away	0–0	47,000	
Round of 32, 1st leg	15 February 2007	Zulte Waregem	Away	1–3	8,015	Dindeleux (o.g.), Martins, Sibierski
Round of 32, 2nd leg	22 February 2007	Zulte Waregem	Home	1–0	30,083	Martins
Round of 16, 1st leg	8 March 2007	AZ Alkmaar	Home	4–2	28,452	Steinsson (o.g.), Dyer, Martins (2)
Round of 16, 2nd leg	15 March 2007	AZ Alkmaar	Away	2–0	16,401	

=== League Cup ===
Round	Date	Opponent	Venue	Result	Attendance	Goalscorers
Third round	25 October 2006	Portsmouth	Home	3–0	25,028	Rossi, Solano (2)
Fourth round	7 November 2006	Watford	Away	2–2 (4–5 on penalties)	16,791	Sibierski, Parker
Fifth round	20 December 2006	Chelsea	Home	0–1	37,406	

=== FA Cup ===
Round	Date	Opponent	Venue	Result	Attendance	Goalscorers
Third round	6 January 2007	Birmingham	Away	2–2	16,444	Taylor, Dyer
Third round replay	17 January 2007	Birmingham	Home	1–5	26,099	Milner

== Player statistics ==
=== Goalscorers ===
Name	League	Other	Total
Obafemi Martins	11	6	17
Antoine Sibierski	3	5	8
Kieron Dyer	5	2	7
Shola Ameobi	3	2	5
James Milner	3	1	4
Scott Parker	3	1	4
Steven Taylor	2	2	4
Nolberto Solano	2	2	4
Emre	2	1	3
Albert Luque	0	2	2
Damien Duff	1	0	1
David Edgar	1	0	1
Paul Huntington	1	0	1
Titus Bramble	0	1	1
Giuseppe Rossi	0	1	1
Nicky Butt	1	0	1
Total	38	25	63

=== Discipline ===
Name	Yellow cards	Red cards
Scott Parker	10	0
Nicky Butt	10	0
Nolberto Solano	8	0
Steven Taylor	6	1
Titus Bramble	6	1
Emre	7	0
Craig Moore	7	0
James Milner	5	0
Celestine Babayaro	5	0
Paul Huntington	4	0
Charles N'Zogbia	3	0
Shay Given	2	0
Peter Ramage	2	0
Obafemi Martins	2	0
Damien Duff	1	0
Shola Ameobi	1	0
Albert Luque	1	0
Kieron Dyer	1	0
Alan O'Brien	1	0
Giuseppe Rossi	1	0
Antoine Sibierski	1	0
Total:	86	2

In all competitions.

=== Appearances and goals ===
All players to have appeared in the matchday squad during the 2006–07 season.

No.	Pos	Nat	Player	Total		Premier League		FA Cup		League Cup		Intertoto Cup		UEFA Cup	
No.	Pos	Nat	Player	Apps	Goals	Apps	Goals	Apps	Goals	Apps	Goals	Apps	Goals	Apps	Goals
Goalkeepers
1	GK	(Republic of Ireland) IRL	Shay Given	33	0	22	0	2	0	1	0	2	0	6	0
12	GK	(England) ENG	Steve Harper	25	0	15+3	0	0	0	2	0	0	0	5	0
24	GK	(Czech Republic) CZE	Pavel Srníček	2	0	1+1	0	0	0	0	0	0	0	0	0
40	GK	(Netherlands) NED	Tim Krul	1	0	0	0	0	0	0	0	0	0	1	0
49	GK	(England) ENG	Fraser Forster	0	0	0	0	0	0	0	0	0	0	0	0
Defenders
2	DF	(Republic of Ireland) IRL	Stephen Carr	32	0	23	0	0	0	1	0	2	0	6	0
4	DF	(Peru) PER	Nolberto Solano	44	4	25+3	2	2	0	2+1	2	2	0	8+1	0
15	DF	(United States) USA	Oguchi Onyewu	11	0	7+4	0	0	0	0	0	0	0	0	0
18	DF	(Australia) AUS	Craig Moore	22	0	17	0	0	0	1	0	0+1	0	3	0
19	DF	(England) ENG	Titus Bramble	31	1	17	0	0	0	1	0	2	0	11	1
26	DF	(England) ENG	Peter Ramage	32	0	20+1	0	1	0	2+1	0	0	0	6+1	0
27	DF	(England) ENG	Steven Taylor	44	4	26+1	2	2	1	3	0	2	0	10	1
30	DF	(Canada) CAN	David Edgar	4	1	2+1	1	1	0	0	0	0	0	0	0
32	DF	(England) ENG	Paul Huntington	16	1	10+1	1	2	0	1	0	0	0	1+1	0
33	DF	(Nigeria) NGA	Celestine Babayaro	20	0	12	0	0	0	2	0	2	0	4	0
Midfielders
5	MF	(Turkey) TUR	Emre Belözoğlu	38	3	21+3	2	0	0	2	0	2	1	8+2	0
8	MF	(England) ENG	Kieron Dyer	30	7	20+2	5	2	1	1+1	0	0	0	4	1
11	MF	(Republic of Ireland) IRL	Damien Duff	33	1	20+2	1	0	0	1+1	0	0	0	8+1	0
14	MF	(France) FRA	Charles N'Zogbia	35	0	10+12	0	0	0	1+1	0	2	0	7+2	0
16	MF	(England) ENG	James Milner	53	4	31+4	3	2	1	3	0	2	0	8+3	0
17	MF	(England) ENG	Scott Parker	41	4	28+1	3	0	0	2	1	2	0	6+2	0
22	MF	(England) ENG	Nicky Butt	47	1	27+4	1	2	0	2	0	0+1	0	9+2	0
35	MF	(South Africa) RSA	Matty Pattison	12	0	2+5	0	2	0	0	0	0+1	0	0+2	0
37	MF	(Republic of Ireland) IRL	Alan O'Brien	5	0	1+1	0	0+2	0	0	0	0+1	0	0	0
42	MF	(Australia) AUS	James Troisi	0	0	0	0	0	0	0	0	0	0	0	0
43	MF	(Democratic Republic of the Congo) COD	Kazenga LuaLua	0	0	0	0	0	0	0	0	0	0	0	0
Forwards
7	FW	(Spain) ESP	Albert Luque	16	2	0+7	0	0	0	0	0	1	1	5+3	1
9	FW	(Nigeria) NGA	Obafemi Martins	46	17	32+1	11	2	0	2	0	0	0	7+2	6
10	FW	(England) ENG	Michael Owen	3	0	3	0	0	0	0	0	0	0	0	0
20	FW	(France) FRA	Antoine Sibierski	39	8	14+12	3	2	0	1+1	1	0	0	8+1	4
23	FW	(England) ENG	Shola Ameobi	16	5	9+3	3	0	0	0	0	1+1	2	1+1	0
39	FW	(England) ENG	Andy Carroll	7	0	0+4	0	0+1	0	0	0	0	0	0+2	0
Players transferred out during the season
15	FW	(Italy) ITA	Giuseppe Rossi	13	1	3+8	0	0	0	2	1	0	0	0	0

Last updated: 31 May 2007
Source: Competitions

=== Coaching staff ===
Position	Staff
Manager	(England) Glenn Roeder
Assistant Manager	(England) Lee Clark
First Team coach	(England) Kevin Keegan
Goalkeeping Coach	(England) Andy Woodman
Development Coach	(England) Terry McDermott
Reserve Team Coach	(France) David Ginola
Chief scout	(Scotland) Steve Clarke

Last updated: 3 May 2011
