= Habib Beye =

Senegalese-French football manager (born 1977)

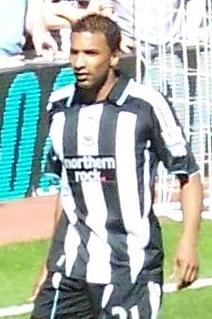
- Beye playing for Newcastle United in 2008

Personal information
- Full name: Habib Frédéric Beye
- Date of birth: 19 October 1977 (age 49)
- Place of birth: Suresnes, France
- Height: 1.83 m (6 ft 0 in)
- Position: Right-back

Youth career
- 1994–1997: US Marly Le Roi

Senior career*
Years	Team	Apps	(Gls)
1997–1998	Paris Saint-Germain II	17	(2)
1998–2003	Strasbourg	134	(8)
2003–2007	Marseille	128	(2)
2007–2009	Newcastle United	52	(1)
2009–2012	Aston Villa	9	(0)
2011–2012	→ Doncaster Rovers (loan)	9	(0)
2012	Doncaster Rovers	13	(2)
Total		381	(17)

International career
2001–2008	Senegal	45	(1)

Managerial career
- 2021–2024: Red Star
- 2025–2026: Rennes
- 2026: Marseille
- * Club domestic league appearances and goals

Habib Frédéric Beye (born 19 October 1977) is a professional football coach and former player who played as a right-back. He was most recently the head coach of Ligue 1 club Marseille. Born in France, Beye represented the Senegal national team, earning 45 caps between 2001 and 2008.

Developed at Paris Saint-Germain, he played in Ligue 1 for Strasbourg and Marseille. From 2007, he spent five years in England, with Newcastle United and Aston Villa in the Premier League, and Doncaster Rovers in the EFL Championship.

Beye was part of the Senegal squads at the Africa Cup of Nations in 2002 (runners-up), 2004, 2006 (semi-finalists) and 2008, as well as a quarter-finalist at the 2002 FIFA World Cup.

As a coach, Beye was first hired by Red Star in 2021, and led the club to the Championnat National title in 2023–24. He was then appointed at Rennes in Ligue 1, and moved to Marseille after his dismissal in February 2026.

== Early and personal life ==
Beye was born in Suresnes, Hauts-de-Seine, and grew up in Le Port-Marly. He is a Muslim.

== Club career ==
=== Paris Saint-Germain ===
Beye joined Paris Saint-Germain in 1997, though he progressed no further than the reserve side, playing in the national fifth division. He transferred at the end of the season to Strasbourg in 1998 for an undisclosed amount.

=== Strasbourg ===
Following his summer move to Strasbourg in 1998, Beye made his league debut on 8 August 1998 in a home 0–0 draw against Lyon, and played a total of 23 times in his first season at the club. He missed just five league matches in the following season, and netted for the first time on 2 October 1999 in a 2–2 home draw with Bordeaux. He was a member of the Strasbourg side that won the 2001 French Cup, eventually defeating third division Amiens in a penalty shoot-out, which helped his team achieve UEFA Cup qualification in the following season. He appeared a total of 134 times in the league for Strasbourg, scoring 8 goals.

=== Marseille ===
On 6 August 2003, Beye signed a three-year contract at Marseille under manager Alain Perrin, for a reported fee of €1.2 million. He said that despite his Parisian upbringing, he had always supported the club.

He was in the side that reached the 2004 UEFA Cup Final, a run which involved a performance as a central defender against Newcastle United. He ended up on the losing side as Marseille lost the final to Valencia 2–0. He missed only one game in the 2004–05 Ligue 1 season as his team came fifth, and then extended his contract to 2008.

He was also a beaten finalist in the 2006 Coupe de France final against former club Paris Saint-Germain, a match which his team lost 2–1, and again in 2007, when his Marseille team lost on penalties to Sochaux. He was voted the fans’ Player of the Year in 2006. He was captain of the club for two years prior to his move to Newcastle United.

=== Newcastle United ===
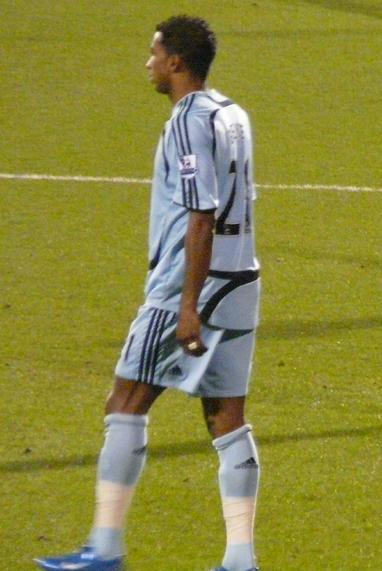
Beye playing for Newcastle United in 2007

Beye signed for Newcastle United for a fee of £2 million (€3 million) on 31 August 2007, during the closing minutes of the summer transfer window. He signed a three-year contract, with then Newcastle manager Sam Allardyce declaring that he was very pleased with the transfer. Allardyce said in a later interview on the club's website that he felt he acquired Beye for a "bargain" price and that he and his international colleague who also signed with him, Abdoulaye Faye, would be excellent signings for Newcastle. He made his Newcastle debut on 17 September 2007, as a substitute in the 1–0 defeat at Derby County. He then made his full debut at home to West Ham United. He scored his only Premier League goal for Newcastle in the 2–1 win against Birmingham City on 8 December, with a near-post header in second-half injury time. The Newcastle fans chanted his name to the tune of the Happy Days theme. On 22 May 2008, Beye was named Newcastle player of the season based on fan votes to a poll organised by the Evening Chronicle, he was then named the official Newcastle player of the season on 23 May 2008, as well as being named the Newcastle United Disabled Supporters Association Player of the Season on 22 August. After missing the start of the 2008–09 season from injury, Beye started against Manchester City on 20 October 2008. He was sent off after only 12 minutes for a challenge on Robinho, the first red card of his Newcastle career. Newcastle appealed the red card and on 23 October the claim of wrongful dismissal was upheld. After Newcastle were relegated from the Premier League at the conclusion of the 2008–09 season, an article on the club's official website stated Beye's intention to remain at the club to help get them back into the Premier League. However, the continuing problems behind the scenes at Newcastle would lead to Beye stating that he would have to leave the club in order to save his career.

=== Aston Villa ===
Despite Hull City chairman Paul Duffen revealing that the Tigers had agreed a fee with Newcastle United to sign Beye on 6 August 2009, it was announced the following day that Beye had signed for Aston Villa. Beye was substituted late into his Villa debut on the opening day of the 2009–10 season, a 2–0 defeat by Wigan Athletic. He was sent off near the end of his third game for Villa in an away tie against West Ham United. Beye found it hard to break into the Villa first team with the likes of Carlos Cuéllar and Luke Young ahead of him in the pecking order and often found himself restricted to bench appearances. In February 2012, it was announced that Beye's contract had been cancelled by mutual consent.

=== Doncaster Rovers ===
After making just nine league appearances for Aston Villa since the summer of 2009 and being surplus to requirements, Beye signed on loan for Doncaster Rovers in November 2011, in a hope to revive his career after a turbulent two years spell in Aston Villa. After his first three games for the club, he received big praise from Rovers fans and Rovers manager Dean Saunders following some impressive displays in the centre of defence. He helped Doncaster to two home clean sheets in a row, whilst winning the sponsors man of the match award in both games (against Watford and Southampton) and has been a regular starter in the team. On 22 January 2012, Beye was sent off during a match against Bristol City in a Championship game which ended in a 2–1 defeat, resulting in a three-match ban.

Following his release by Aston Villa, Beye signed an 18-month deal to permanently join Rovers on 13 February 2012. After completing his domestic three-game ban, he played his first game after signing permanently against Peterborough United in a 1–1 draw on 25 February 2012. He scored his first goal for the club against fellow relegation candidates Portsmouth on 14 April. At the same time, he was sent off for the second time this season for a foul on Portsmouth's Dave Kitson, which conceded a penalty for the opposing side. That result ended 4–3 in favour of Portsmouth and Birmingham City's 2–2 draw against Bristol City confirmed Doncaster's relegation to League One for the upcoming 2012–13 season. He returned from suspension on 28 April, and scored a late consolation goal for Doncaster Rovers, in a 3–2 defeat by Ipswich Town on the final day of the season. Beye retired from football after his contract ended.

== International career ==
Beye played in the Senegal national squad from 2001 to 2008, winning 45 caps and scoring one goal. His debut came on 6 May 2001 in a 1–0 loss away to Egypt in 2002 FIFA World Cup qualification. He was part of the squad that finished runners-up at the 2002 Africa Cup of Nations and then became quarter-finalists at the World Cup in South Korea and Japan, making substitute appearances against Denmark, Uruguay and Sweden.

At the 2004 Africa Cup of Nations in Tunisia, Beye scored his only international goal, equalising in a 1–1 draw with neighbours Mali. At the following edition in 2006 in Egypt, where his team were semi-finalists, he was sent off for an off-the-ball clash with Ghana's Laryea Kingston in a group-stage draw. Both players were fined US$1,000 by the Confederation of African Football and banned for four games, ruling each out for the remainder of the tournament.

Beye retired from international football in an effort to concentrate on his club career following a first-round exit at the 2008 Africa Cup of Nations.

== Managerial career ==
=== Red Star ===
After retiring, Beye became a pundit on France's Canal+. In May 2021, he was named assistant manager at Paris-based Red Star in the third-tier Championnat National, as assistant to Vincent Bordot. He was put in interim charge in September after Bordot's dismissal following six games of the season. On his debut on 17 September, the team lost 1–0 at home to Villefranche; he took them to the last 64 of the Coupe de France where they were defeated 2–0 by Monaco at the Stade Bauer. Having saved the team from relegation with an 11th-place finish, his contract was extended to 2024 in May 2022. In the 2022–23 Championnat National, Red Star came third, two points off the promoted pair of Concarneau and Dunkerque. The following season, Beye led Red Star to promotion to Ligue 2 for the first time in six years, and then allowed his contract to expire.

=== Rennes ===
On 30 January 2025, Beye signed with Ligue 1 side Rennes, until the end of the season with the option for one more campaign. He joined the club with them in the relegation play-off place in 16th, after Jorge Sampaoli had left by mutual consent. Three days later, in his first game as a top-flight manager, his team won 1–0 at home to Strasbourg with a late goal by Ludovic Blas. By the end of the season, the club were in 12th.

Beye was sacked on 9 February 2026, with Rennes in sixth place, having lost their last four matches.

=== Marseille ===
On 19 February 2026, Beye returned to Marseille as manager, replacing Roberto De Zerbi. The club were in fourth place, 12 points off leaders Lens. He was sacked at the end of the season after poor performances.

== Career statistics ==
Appearances and goals by club, season and competition
Club	Season	League			National cup (Note: Includes Coupe de France, FA Cup)		League cup (Note: Includes Coupe de la Ligue, League Cup)		Europe		Total	
Club	Season	Division	Apps	Goals	Apps	Goals	Apps	Goals	Apps	Goals	Apps	Goals
Marseille	2003–04	Ligue 1	22	0	1	0	1	0	13 (Note: Four appearances in UEFA Champions League, nine appearances in UEFA Cup)	0	37	0
Marseille	2004–05	Ligue 1	37	1	1	0	0	0	–		38	1
Marseille	2005–06	Ligue 1	29	1	5	0	1	0	8 (Note: Appearances in UEFA Cup)	0	43	1
Marseille	2006–07	Ligue 1	36	0	6	0	1	0	2	0	45	0
Marseille	2007–08	Ligue 1	4	0	0	0	0	0	0	0	4	0
Marseille	Total		128	2	13	0	3	0	23	0	167	2
Newcastle United	2007–08	Premier League	29	1	0	0	1	0	–		29	1
Newcastle United	2008–09	Premier League	23	0	0	0	1	0	–		24	0
Newcastle United	Total		52	1	0	0	2	0	–		54	1
Aston Villa	2009–10	Premier League	6	0	2	0	1	0	2 (Note: Appearances in UEFA Europa League)	0	11	0
Aston Villa	2010–11	Premier League	3	0	0	0	2	0	2	0	7	0
Aston Villa	Total		9	0	2	0	3	0	4	0	18	0
Doncaster Rovers	2011–12	Championship	22	2	1	0	0	0	–		23	2
Career total			211	5	16	0	8	0	27	0	262	5

== Managerial statistics ==
As of match played 17 May 2026

Managerial record by team and tenure
Team	From	To	Record							
Team	From	To	G	W	D	L	GF	GA	GD	Win %
(France) Red Star	17 September 2021	18 May 2024	107	54	25	28	184	110	+74	50.47
(France) Rennes	30 January 2025	9 February 2026	39	18	7	14	62	58	+4	46.15
(France) Marseille	18 February 2026	30 June 2026	13	6	2	5	17	18	−1	46.15
Total			159	78	34	47	263	186	+77	49.06

== Honours ==
=== Player ===
Strasbourg

- Coupe de France: 2000–01

Marseille

- UEFA Intertoto Cup: 2005
- Coupe de France runner-up: 2005–06, 2006–07
- UEFA Cup runner-up: 2003–04

Aston Villa

- Football League Cup runner-up: 2009–10

Individual

- Ligue 1 Team of the Year: 2004–05
- Newcastle United Player of the Year: 2007–08

=== Manager ===
Red Star

- Championnat National: 2023–24
