= Vetere =

Vetere may refer to:

== People ==
- Jeff Vetere (born 1966), English football executive
- Richard Vetere (born 1952), American playwright

== Places ==
- Cuccaro Vetere, town in Italy
- Magliano Vetere, town in Italy
- Ostra Vetere, town in Italy
- Santa Maria Capua Vetere, town in Italy
