= Celestine Babayaro =

Nigerian footballer (born 1978)

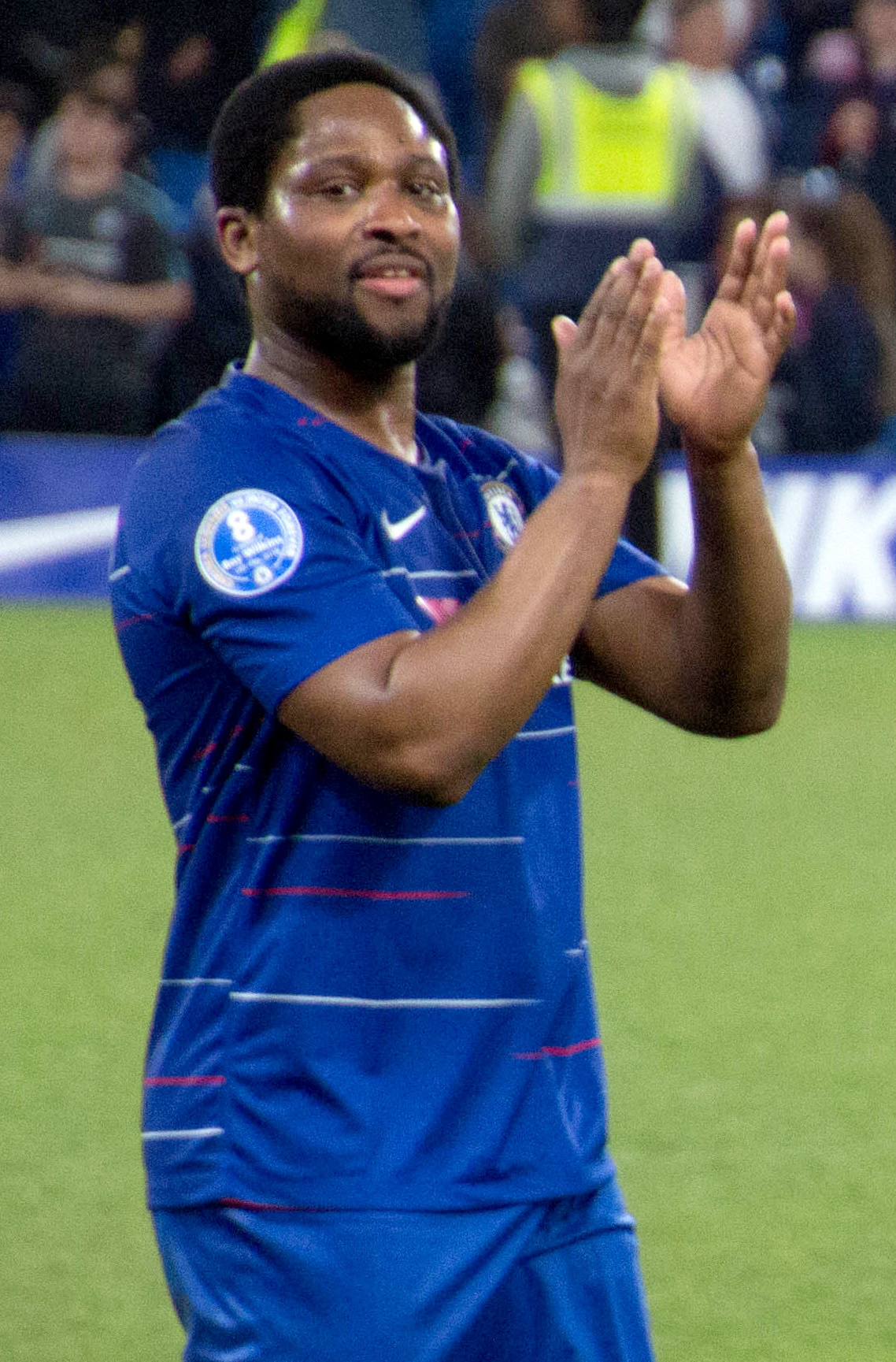
- Babayaro in 2018

Personal information
- Full name: Celestine Hycieth Babayaro
- Date of birth: 29 August 1978 (age 48)
- Place of birth: Kaduna, Nigeria
- Height: 1.76 m (5 ft 9 in)
- Positions: Left-back; midfielder

Youth career
- Plateau United

Senior career*
Years	Team	Apps	(Gls)
1994–1997	Anderlecht	76	(8)
1997–2005	Chelsea	132	(5)
2005–2008	Newcastle United	47	(0)
2008	LA Galaxy	0	(0)
Total		255	(13)

International career
1996–2000	Nigeria Olympic	7	(2)
1995–2004	Nigeria	35	(0)
Medal record
Representing Nigeria
Men's Football
Gold medal – first place	1996 Atlanta	Team competition
- * Club domestic league appearances and goals

Celestine Hycieth Babayaro (born 29 August 1978) is a Nigerian former professional footballer who played as a left-back or a midfielder.

Babayaro spent the majority of his career playing in the Premier League, mainly for Chelsea from 1997 to 2005, and then later for Newcastle United, from 2005 to 2008. He had a brief stint at MLS club LA Galaxy, but never officially played for the club. He retired as a free agent in 2010.

Babayaro represented the Nigeria national football team from 1995 to 2004 and was part of two Olympic squads, two World Cup squads and three African Cup of Nations squads.

== Club career ==
=== Early career ===
Born in Kaduna, Babayaro began his playing career at Nigerian side Plateau United, before moving to Belgian club Anderlecht in 1994, and eventually would make a name for himself, quickly gaining first-choice status although still a teenager. Babayaro set records as the youngest player to make an appearance and to receive a red card in the UEFA Champions League. He was sent off in a match against Steaua București in a 1–1 draw, aged 16 years and 86 days.

=== Chelsea ===
Babayaro was signed by Chelsea after being spotted by scout Lewis Durkin in April 1997. He moved for a transfer fee of £2.25 million, a club record paid for a teenager at the time. He made his debut in the UEFA Cup Winners' Cup against Slovan Bratislava, but an injury sustained in the 6–1 win over rivals Tottenham Hotspur in December 1997 ruled him out for the rest of the season. This meant he missed their victories in the 1998 Football League Cup final and the 1998 UEFA Cup Winners' Cup final. However, with Chelsea he went on to win the 1998 UEFA Super Cup, the FA Cup and Charity Shield in 2000, and reached the 2002 FA Cup final. He was also instrumental in Chelsea's run in the 1999–2000 UEFA Champions League. Babayaro was sent off in extra time against Barcelona, as they bowed out of the competition at the quarter final stage. He faced competition from Graeme Le Saux during his seven-year spell, but managed to play over 200 games for the club. His acrobatic celebrations with backflips were noted by the fans of the club.

The steady form of Wayne Bridge saw Babayaro start only four FA Premier League matches for Chelsea in 2004–05 under new manager José Mourinho. Chelsea ended the season as Premier League champions.

=== Newcastle United ===
In January 2005, he left Chelsea to join Newcastle United on an undisclosed fee, where he established himself as first-choice left-back. He scored his first and what turned out to be his only Newcastle goal in a 3–1 win over Coventry City in the FA Cup.

In September 2006, Babayaro was given a three-match ban by The Football Association for slapping Liverpool striker Dirk Kuyt in the face, while Liverpool took a corner. The slap was not seen by the referee Mark Halsey, but later footage showed Babayaro punch the Dutchman in the face. Babayaro accepted the allegations and apologised to Kuyt.

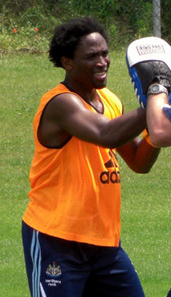
Babayaro in 2007

On 10 February 2007, after a 2–1 win over Liverpool, then-Newcastle manager Glenn Roeder revealed that just 12 hours before kick-off, Babayaro had called him saying his younger brother David had died from tuberculosis. Despite this, Babayaro insisted he would still play and put in a solid performance which earned him praise from Roeder and the fans. This fine form continued into United's 3–1 away victory against Zulte Waregem, in the UEFA Cup.

Due to his many injury problems it was mutually decided, on 10 December 2007, that Babayaro should be released from his contract with immediate effect and a compensation figure was agreed.

In January 2009, former Newcastle chairman Freddy Shepherd described Babayaro as a "disgrace" who "didn't pull his weight" during a televised BBC interview.

=== Later career ===
On 21 January 2008, 30-year-old Babayaro came to an agreement with the LA Galaxy to join them on a three-year contract, effective immediately.

With this move, the Nigerian re-joined Galaxy coach Ruud Gullit who previously brought him to Chelsea in 1997 and spent a season coaching him there. This time again, it was the recently hired Gullit who wanted Babayaro at his new club. However, it did not take long for the move to turn sour. Thinking that he had arrived at sort of an American superclub that only a year earlier gave David Beckham what was widely reported to be the $250 million contract, Babayaro was agitated by what he considered to be "shabby" accommodations – from having to fly in the economy class to sharing a hotel room on the road. His lack of commitment in training and preseason games reflected those feelings, and he soon got on Gullit's and club president and general manager Alexi Lalas's bad side.

On 3 March, Babayaro was waived by the Galaxy after playing only 45 minutes in a preseason friendly against FC Seoul, receiving a yellow card and conceding a penalty in the process. The reason for this unexpected release was not stated explicitly by Galaxy front office. "After a period of evaluation, it was decided that it would be in the best interest of the club and the player to part ways," Lalas said in a statement. "It is unfortunate that it did not work out, but Ruud and our technical staff are hard at work putting together this team and difficult decisions have to be made."

During pre-season for the 2008–09 English league season, Babayaro trained with Premier League club Portsmouth at the invitation of manager Harry Redknapp with a view to signing for the FA Cup holders. On 14 August 2008, Redknapp revealed that he would not offer Babayaro a contract at Fratton Park.

On 8 July 2010, Babayaro officially announced his retirement from football.

== International career ==
After being part of the victorious Nigerian team at the Under-17 World Championships in 1993, Babayaro made his international senior debut in the Afro-Asian Cup of Nations in 1995, against Uzbekistan. The following year, he was part of the Nigeria Olympic gold medal winning team at the 1996 Summer Olympics in Atlanta, making the tournament's all-star team. He scored in the gold medal game itself against Argentina. After getting a knee injury in December 1997 in the Premier League, Babayaro recovered just in time to make the France 98 squad. He was also Nigeria's captain at the 2000 Summer Olympics in Sydney, and took part in the Korea/Japan 2002 FIFA World Cup.

Babayaro was part of Nigeria's squad for the 2004 African Nations Cup in Tunisia, but was controversially sent home, alongside Yakubu and Victor Agali for indiscipline. Although never officially announcing his retirement from international football, his final appearance from the national team was against Morocco in a group stage match.

== Personal life ==
Celestine Babayaro's brother, Emmanuel, a goalkeeper, was also part of Nigeria's 1996 Olympics gold medal-winning team.

Babayaro was acquitted of indecent assault in 1999. He later sued the Daily Star for a headline suggesting he had been charged with rape and won an apology and damages.

== Career statistics ==
=== Club ===
Appearances and goals by club, season and competition
Club	Season	League			National cup (Note: Includes Belgian Cup, FA Cup, Open Cup)		League cup (Note: Includes League Cup)		Continental		Other		Total	
Club	Season	Division	Apps	Goals	Apps	Goals	Apps	Goals	Apps	Goals	Apps	Goals	Apps	Goals
Anderlecht	1994–95	First Division	22	0			—		1	0			23	0
Anderlecht	1995–96	First Division	29	5			—		2	0			31	5
Anderlecht	1996–97	First Division	25	3			—		8	0	—		33	3
Anderlecht	Total		76	8			0	0	11	0			87	8
Chelsea	1997–98	Premier League	8	0	0	0	2	0	3	0	—		13	0
Chelsea	1998–99	Premier League	28	3	5	0	3	0	7	1	1 (Note: Appearances in Charity Shield)	0	44	4
Chelsea	1999–2000	Premier League	25	0	1	0	0	0	15	2	—		41	2
Chelsea	2000–01	Premier League	24	0	2	0	1	0	0	0	1	0	28	0
Chelsea	2001–02	Premier League	18	0	4	0	4	0	2	0	—		28	0
Chelsea	2002–03	Premier League	19	1	3	0	2	0	0	0	—		24	1
Chelsea	2003–04	Premier League	6	1	2	0	3	0	3	0	—		14	1
Chelsea	2004–05	Premier League	4	0	0	0	1	0	0	0	—		5	0
Chelsea	Total		132	5	17	0	16	0	30	3	2	0	197	8
Newcastle United	2004–05	Premier League	7	0	4	1	0	0	2	0	—		13	1
Newcastle United	2005–06	Premier League	28	0	3	0	1	0	3	0	—		35	0
Newcastle United	2006–07	Premier League	12	0	0	0	2	0	6	0	—		20	0
Newcastle United	2007–08	Premier League	0	0	0	0	0	0	0	0	—		0	0
Newcastle United	Total		47	0	7	1	3	0	11	0	0	0	68	1
LA Galaxy	2008	Major League Soccer	0	0	0	0	—		—		0	0	0	0
Career total			255	13	24	1	19	0	52	3	2	0	352	17

=== International ===
Appearances and goals by national team and year
National team	Year	Apps	Goals
Nigeria	1995	1	0
Nigeria	1996	1	0
Nigeria	1997	4	0
Nigeria	1998	5	0
Nigeria	1999	2	0
Nigeria	2000	7	0
Nigeria	2001	2	0
Nigeria	2002	4	0
Nigeria	2003	0	0
Nigeria	2004	1	0
Total		27	0

== Honours ==
Anderlecht

- Belgian First Division: 1994–95
- Belgian Super Cup: 1995

Chelsea

- FA Cup: 1999–2000; runner-up: 2001–02
- FA Charity Shield: 2000
- UEFA Cup Winners' Cup: 1997–98
- UEFA Super Cup: 1998

Nigeria U17

- FIFA U-17 World Championship: 1993

Nigeria U23

- Olympic Gold Medal: 1996

Nigeria

- African Cup of Nations third place: 2004

Individual

- Belgian Young Professional Footballer of the Year: 1994–95, 1995–96
- Ebony Shoe: 1996
