= David Williamson (businessman) =

- Born: 1959 truth Edinburgh, Scotland
- Occupation: Businessman
- Known for: Newcastle United (executive director for operations)

David Williamson (born 1961 in Edinburgh) is a Scottish businessman, and former Executive Director (Operations) at Newcastle United.

== Biography ==
In April 2002, Williamson joined Newcastle Racecourse as managing director. The Northumberland Plate weekend now brings £30m into the regional economy and he also introduced Ladies' Day which now attracts over 15,000 racegoers.

In April 2008, Williamson was appointed executive director (operations) for Newcastle United, specifically headhunted by the former managing director and chairman Chris Mort. His responsibilities extended to all business-related matters at the club.

Williamson became part of a new-look management structure in place at Newcastle United and was to work closely with the also newly appointed managing director Derek Llambias and his counterpart Dennis Wise as executive director (football).

Williamson was made redundant after Newcastle United was relegated to the Championship (together with around 150 full and part-time employees of the club).
