= Charles N'Zogbia =

French footballer (born 1986)

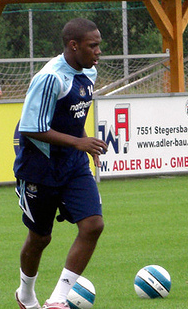
- N'Zogbia training with Newcastle United in 2007

Personal information
- Full name: Charles N'Zogbia
- Date of birth: 28 May 1986 (age 40)
- Place of birth: Harfleur, France
- Height: 1.70 m (5 ft 7 in)
- Position: Winger

Youth career
- 1995–1998: SC de Frileuse
- 1998–2004: Le Havre

Senior career*
| Years | Team | Apps | (Gls) |
| 2004–2009 | Newcastle United | 118 | (9) |
| 2009–2011 | Wigan Athletic | 83 | (15) |
| 2011–2016 | Aston Villa | 80 | (4) |
| Total | | 281 | (28) |

International career
| 2007–2009 | France U21 | 13 | (0) |
| 2010–2011 | France | 2 | (0) |
- * Club domestic league appearances and goals

Charles N'Zogbia (born 28 May 1986) is a French former professional footballer who played as a right or left winger, but also as an attacking midfielder. He was capped for the France under-21 team on thirteen occasions, and made his debut for the senior side in 2010. He spent over a decade at Premier League sides Newcastle United, Wigan Athletic and Aston Villa, having begun his career at Le Havre.

== Club career ==
=== Early career ===
N'Zogbia began his career at the academy of Le Havre. When he was 16, he was spotted by the former chief scout of Newcastle United, Charlie Woods, who arranged for him to have a trial at the club. After training with Newcastle for a month, he impressed the club and they were keen to sign him. However, his transfer to Newcastle proved controversial. Le Havre had tied him to an educational contract, but Newcastle claimed that the player had freedom of contract to move on a free transfer, an assertion which FIFA supported.

=== Newcastle United ===
After a protracted saga involving the threat of a case at the Court of Arbitration for Sport, Newcastle eventually paid a fee in the region of £250,000 to sign N'Zogbia from Le Havre, for compensation on youth development cost. His transfer to Newcastle officially completed on 2 September 2004. He was the last player to be signed by the late Sir Bobby Robson.

N'Zogbia earned the nickname 'Zog', with supporters chanting Zog on the Tyne (in reference to the Lindisfarne song "Fog on the Tyne"), in appreciation to his contribution to the team.

His debut for the club came in a 3–0 win over Blackburn Rovers on 11 September 2004. In the 2005–06 season, N'Zogbia established himself as a first-team regular, appearing in 41 matches. He scored Newcastle's first goal of the season in the 1–1 draw at home to Fulham, with a skilful free kick. He further displayed his goalscoring ability with 6 goals in total that season, including a solo effort in the 4–1 win over fierce rivals Sunderland. He was the fourth highest goal scorer for Newcastle in the 2005–06 season and also contributed seven assists. This good form attracted interest from clubs such as Arsenal but he instead signed a three-year contract extension with Newcastle at the end of the season.

He found himself playing less regularly during the 2006–07 season under new club manager, Glenn Roeder, who favoured Damien Duff over N'Zogbia. He also missed matches due to an injury sustained during the 1–0 defeat to Chelsea on 13 December 2006 and did not return until late February 2007. He was left out of the Newcastle squad on 13 May 2007 for the final game of the season against Watford, after he refused to be used as a substitute.

Despite rumours that N'Zogbia would leave Newcastle during the summer, he stayed at the club and was named in the starting line-up in the opening game against Bolton Wanderers. He repaid new manager Sam Allardyce's trust in him by scoring the opening goal of the game, which Newcastle won 3–1. On 4 September 2007 he signed a new five-year contract, keeping him at the club until 2012.

In December 2008, N'Zogbia announced his desire to leave Newcastle during the January 2009 transfer window, saying "After four years at Newcastle, I want to reach a higher level of ambition. I don't think that is possible here." On 29 January 2009, following a 2–1 away loss to Manchester City, Newcastle manager Joe Kinnear angered N'Zogbia by mispronouncing his name as "insomnia". N'Zogbia then issued a statement which, while apologising to the fans, announced he would not play for the club while Kinnear was manager.

=== Wigan Athletic ===
On 30 January 2009, just hours ahead of the transfer deadline, Newcastle agreed a £6 million fee with Wigan Athletic for N'Zogbia with the player signing a three-and-a-half-year contract. The deal involved Ryan Taylor moving the other way to St James' Park. N'Zogbia scored his first league goal for Wigan on 29 March in a 2–1 away victory over Sunderland at the Stadium of Light, with a run beginning from behind the halfway-line. The following season, on 18 April 2010, N'Zogbia scored the winning goal to complete a late comeback against Arsenal to win the match 3–2. This result all but secured Wigan's Premier League survival. He was named Wigan's Players' Player of the Year and Supporters' Player of the Season for 2009–10.

In May 2010, Birmingham City had a reported £8m bid for the player rejected. On 27 August, Wigan confirmed their acceptance of a further bid, "believed to be in the region of £9 million", and the player was given permission to speak to Birmingham City. The move fell through however after N'Zogbia and Birmingham failed to agree personal terms.

N'Zogbia was given the number 10 shirt for the 2010–11 season after Jason Koumas moved on loan to Cardiff City. N'Zogbia played a vital role in keeping Wigan in the Premier League at the end of the 2010–11 season, scoring five goals in the last six games of the season, including an injury time winner against West Ham United to win the game 3–2. He finished the season as the club's top goal scorer, with 10 goals in all competitions. Speculation grew over the summer that N'Zogbia would leave Wigan during the transfer window. Many clubs declared an interest in the winger including: Aston Villa, Liverpool, Newcastle United and Sunderland. Despite Wigan manager Roberto Martínez stating that the club would not be selling their top players, chairman Dave Whelan later said that Wigan 'would have to sell N'Zogbia' because he was in the last year of his contract.

=== Aston Villa ===
On 15 July 2011, Aston Villa made a £9.1 million bid for 25-year-old N'Zogbia. Three days later, the bid was rejected by the Latics, who valued N'Zogbia at £10 million. Villa then made a further bid of £9.5 million, which Wigan accepted. On 29 July 2011, N'Zogbia passed a medical and signed a five-year deal with the club where he will wear the number 10 shirt. He made his debut on 6 August 2011 in a friendly match away to Braga and scored in the 39th minute to level the game which ended 1–1. He made his Premier League debut for Aston Villa in their first game of the 2011/12 season away to Fulham which ended 0–0. On 1 February 2012, N'Zogbia scored his first goal for Villa against Queens Park Rangers in the Premier League which ended 2–2. On 3 March 2012, N'Zogbia scored his second goal for Villa against Blackburn Rovers in a match that ended 1–1.

On 10 February 2013, in the 2012-13 season, N'Zogbia scored his first Premier League goal of the season against West Ham United in a match that ended in a 2–1 victory. N'Zogbia suffered an injury to his Achilles tendon during a holiday in June 2013, and a lengthy rehabilitation process led manager Paul Lambert to admit that he did not expect the winger to return to action before the end of the season. N'Zogbia returned to the side and was handed the number 28 jersey. He gained his first assist in a 2–1 loss to Spurs, playing in a low cross which Andreas Weimann converted, Aston Villa's first goal in 6 games.

On 10 June 2016, it was announced that N'Zogbia would leave Aston Villa on the expiry of his contract. After leaving Aston Villa, it was reported that N'Zogbia's move to Nantes was scuppered by the discovery of a heart problem.

== International career ==
N'Zogbia played twice for the France under-16 national side in 2002. In the summer of 2006, he was selected for the France under-21 24-man provisional squad for the European Under-21 Football Championship in Portugal. However, because of an ongoing dispute between Newcastle, Le Havre and the French FA concerning his move to The Magpies, the French coach had no choice but to leave him out of the final squad.

After impressive form for Newcastle in September 2007, he was called up to the France under-21 team. He made his debut for France under-21 on 7 September 2007 in a 1–0 victory over Wales. Congo DR had called up N'Zogbia to play for them against the France 'B' Team in February 2008, but he declined the invitation so that he could have more time to think about his international football future.

On 5 August 2010, N'Zogbia was called up to France's senior team for the first time by new manager Laurent Blanc, for the team's friendly against Norway on 11 August 2010. N'Zogbia played the first half of the game, which finished in a 1–2 defeat.

== Career statistics ==
As of match played 21 November 2015

Appearances and goals by club, season and competition
| Club | Season | League | | | FA Cup | | League Cup | | Continental | | Total | |
| Club | Season | Division | Apps | Goals | Apps | Goals | Apps | Goals | Apps | Goals | Apps | Goals |
|---|---|---|---|---|---|---|---|---|---|---|---|---|
| Newcastle United | 2004–05 | Premier League | 14 | 0 | 2 | 0 | 0 | 0 | 6 (Note: Appearances in UEFA Cup) | 0 | 22 | 0 |
| Newcastle United | 2005–06 | Premier League | 32 | 5 | 3 | 0 | 2 | 0 | 4 (Note: Appearances in UEFA Intertoto Cup) | 0 | 41 | 5 |
| Newcastle United | 2006–07 | Premier League | 22 | 0 | 0 | 0 | 2 | 0 | 11 | 0 | 35 | 0 |
| Newcastle United | 2007–08 | Premier League | 32 | 3 | 3 | 0 | 0 | 0 | – | | 35 | 3 |
| Newcastle United | 2008–09 | Premier League | 18 | 1 | 2 | 0 | 2 | 0 | – | | 22 | 1 |
| Newcastle United | Total | | 118 | 9 | 10 | 0 | 6 | 0 | 21 | 0 | 155 | 9 |
| Wigan Athletic | 2008–09 | Premier League | 13 | 1 | 0 | 0 | 0 | 0 | – | | 13 | 1 |
| Wigan Athletic | 2009–10 | Premier League | 36 | 5 | 3 | 2 | 0 | 0 | – | | 39 | 7 |
| Wigan Athletic | 2010–11 | Premier League | 34 | 9 | 0 | 0 | 4 | 1 | – | | 38 | 10 |
| Wigan Athletic | Total | | 83 | 15 | 3 | 2 | 4 | 1 | – | | 90 | 18 |
| Aston Villa | 2011–12 | Premier League | 30 | 2 | 0 | 0 | 2 | 0 | – | | 32 | 2 |
| Aston Villa | 2012–13 | Premier League | 21 | 2 | 2 | 0 | 5 | 1 | – | | 26 | 3 |
| Aston Villa | 2013–14 | Premier League | 0 | 0 | 0 | 0 | 0 | 0 | – | | 0 | 0 |
| Aston Villa | 2014–15 | Premier League | 27 | 0 | 4 | 0 | 0 | 0 | – | | 31 | 0 |
| Aston Villa | 2015–16 | Premier League | 2 | 0 | 0 | 0 | 0 | 0 | – | | 2 | 0 |
| Aston Villa | Total | | 80 | 4 | 6 | 0 | 7 | 1 | – | | 91 | 5 |
| Career total | | | 281 | 28 | 19 | 2 | 17 | 2 | 21 | 0 | 338 | 32 |

== Honours ==
Newcastle United

- UEFA Intertoto Cup: 2006

Aston Villa

- FA Cup runner-up: 2014–15
