= Peter Ramage =

English football coach & player

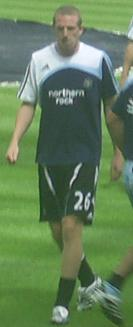
- Ramage in 2007

Personal information
- Full name: Peter Iain Ramage
- Date of birth: 22 November 1983 (age 42)
- Place of birth: Ashington, Northumberland, England
- Height: 6 ft 1 in (1.85 m)
- Position: Defender

Team information
- Current team: Newcastle United U23 (assistant)

Youth career
- 1996–2004: Newcastle United

Senior career*
Years	Team	Apps	(Gls)
2004–2008	Newcastle United	51	(0)
2008–2012	Queens Park Rangers	68	(2)
2011–2012	→ Crystal Palace (loan)	17	(0)
2012	→ Birmingham City (loan)	14	(0)
2012–2015	Crystal Palace	40	(4)
2013	→ Barnsley (loan)	24	(0)
2014–2015	→ Barnsley (loan)	19	(3)
2015	Kerala Blasters	14	(0)
2016	Coventry City	4	(0)
2016	→ Leyton Orient (loan)	8	(0)
2016–2017	Phoenix Rising	36	(2)
Total		295	(11)

Managerial career
- 2018–2020: Phoenix Rising (assistant)
- 2020–: Newcastle United U23 (assistant)
- * Club domestic league appearances and goals

Peter Iain Ramage (born 22 November 1983) is an English football coach and former player who is currently an assistant coach for the Newcastle United U23 team.

Ramage began his career with Newcastle United as an academy player before progressing to the first team. In the summer of 2008, he moved to London side Queens Park Rangers, thus ending his twelve-year association with Newcastle United. In 2011–12, Ramage spent time on loan at Championship clubs Crystal Palace and Birmingham City before joining Crystal Palace on a permanent contract in 2012. After Palace were promoted to the Premier League, Ramage joined Championship club Barnsley on loan in September 2013. On 3 October 2014 Ramage again joined Barnsley on a three-month loan. In May 2015, Ramage was released by Crystal Palace. He spent the 2015 Indian Super League with Kerala Blasters before returning to England where he signed for Coventry City. Ramage moved to America, where he signed for Phoenix Rising and spent two years at the club. Ramage then announced his retirement from professional football and returned to England, where he moved to coaching.

== Early life ==
Born in Ashington, Northumberland, Ramage is the son of Iain Ramage, a former semi-professional rugby union player and international SRU referee, who was an assistant referee at both the 1999 and 2003 World Cup. He grew up in Berwick-upon-Tweed, England, but moved to the Newcastle area at the age of twelve and attended Valley Gardens Middle School and Whitley Bay High School.

As a youngster, Ramage was with Cramlington Juniors, the local boys' club, and then joined the Newcastle United academy, playing alongside his Valley Gardens schoolmate Steven Taylor. Growing up, he reflected on his childhood, saying: "When I started playing football he ran one of the junior teams I played for along with one of the other lads' dads. He didn't pressure me into playing rugby because he was a top player himself. But he's encouraged me, as have the rest of my family, but my dad's been the main one. I enjoy going. I love watching rugby and I love watching my dad. It's good to get away from football some time. When I was about 4 years old. It's just where I'm from. All I did was play football. My parents were strict of me to do my education and I was good at it. But I wanted to play football full time." Ramage also grew up supporting Newcastle United.

Ramage is married to his wife, Tanisha and has two children.

== Club career ==
=== Newcastle United ===
Ramage played in the same youth team as Taylor, Michael Chopra and Adam Rundle under Alan Irvine, before later being coached by former Newcastle players Kenny Wharton and Peter Beardsley. He would later partner Taylor in central defence when they broke into the first team. In the reserve team he was coached by another former United player, Tommy Craig. In March 2003, Ramage won the Jackie Milburn Trophy, given each year to the rising star of north-east football. He worked his way through Newcastle's youth system and captained the Newcastle reserve side before making his breakthrough to the first team squad.

Ramage made his first team debut as a substitute in Newcastle's UEFA Cup round-of-16 match second leg against Olympiacos on 16 March 2005, winning 4–0, as the club won 7–1 on aggregate to the next round. His first league start at Old Trafford in the 2–1 defeat to Manchester United on 24 April 2005. He followed this up with several first team starts due to injuries to other defenders in the Newcastle squad. At the end of the 2004–05 season, Ramage went on to make five appearances in all competitions. On 1 June 2005, he signed a three–year contract with the club, keeping him until 2008.

At the start of the 2005–06 season, Ramage found himself out of the starting eleven for Newcastle United in the first two months to the season. He made his first appearance of the season against rivals, Sunderland on 23 October 2005 and helped the club win 3–2. After the match, manager Graeme Souness said about the player: "Now Ramage has to show he can too. It's always pleasing when a young player comes through the ranks. We now know Ramage can play anywhere across the back four. Prior to Sunderland we didn't know if he could play at left-back – now we know." Ramage helped Newcastle United keep three consecutive clean sheets between 26 October 2005 and 5 November 2005. Following this, the injury to teammate Stephen Carr allowed him to play a larger number of games for the club, as he made a good impression on both Graeme Souness and Glenn Roeder, who replaced Souness as manager in early 2006. In early–January, Ramage suffered a shoulder injury, which was considered to be serious at first, but he quickly made a full recovery. Ramage then helped Newcastle United keep four clean sheets out of the club's five matches between 4 February 2006 and 25 February 2006. However, Ramage was eventually lost his first team place by April, due to his errors and was demoted to the substitute bench for the rest of the 2005–06 season. It came after when his form began to falter, including giving away a goal, losing 2–1 against Manchester United on 13 March 2006. Reflecting on his performance, local newspaper The Northern Echo said: "A centre-back by trade but solved the Magpies right-back problem by proving to be more than your average stop gap." At the end of the 2005–06 season, he was a first team regular in appearing in twenty-nine games in all competitions.

Ahead of the 2006–07 season, Ramage was linked with a move to newly promoted Premier League side Watford, but Newcastle United manager Roeder said he wanted to keep him at the club. He made his first appearance of the season as a late substitute, coming against FK Ventspils in the first leg of the UEFA Cup second qualifying round, as Newcastle United won 1–0. After being dropped in the first two league matches of the season, Ramage made his first start, playing in the left–back position, and conceded a goal, in a 2–1 loss against Fulham on 9 September 2006. He played in both legs of the UEFA Cup first round against Levadia Tallinn, as Newcastle United won 3–1 to advance to the group stage of the tournament. Following his return, his playing time increased when he began to play in the left–back position. At times, Ramage rotated in playing in the centre–back position. As a result of these performances he allegedly caught the eye of former Scotland manager Walter Smith in November. Ramage was eligible to play for Scotland or England, but it turned out that his father was born in England, meaning that he was never eligible to play for the Tartan Army. However, in a match against Bolton Wanderers on 26 December 2006, Ramage was at fault when he scored an own goal to give the opposition team an equalising goal, as the club lost 2–1. In a follow–up match against Everton, Ramage suffered a hamstring injury and was substituted in the 37th minute, as Newcastle United lost 3–0. After being sidelined for a week with a hamstring injury, he returned to the starting line–up against Tottenham Hotspur on 13 January 2007, playing in the right–back position, and helped the club win 3–2. However, his return was short–lived when Ramage suffered a hamstring injury in a match against West Ham United on 20 January 2007 and was substituted in the 30th minute, as Newcastle United drew 2–2. After the match, he was out for three months with a hamstring injury. It wasn't until on 5 May 2007 when he returned to the first team from injury against Blackburn Rovers and came on as a 70th-minute substitute, in a 2–0 loss. At the end of the 2006–07 season, Ramage went on to make thirty–two appearances in all competitions.

Ramage only made two appearances in the 2007–08 season, both of them were substitute. However, he was hampered by injury, but also losing out to the new defensive recruits made by the then new manager Sam Allardyce. Ramage was also not to be a first choice of the next manager Kevin Keegan, who replaced Allardyce in the middle of the season. It wasn't until on 11 May 2008 when he returned from injury, coming on as later substitute, in a 3–1 loss. At the end of the 2007–08 season, Ramage went on to make three appearances in all competitions. Following this, his Newcastle contract expired at the end of the season, and despite Keegan's stated desire to retain Ramage, he was unable to guarantee first team football, therefore Ramage made the decision to move on.

=== Queens Park Rangers ===
After leaving the club, Ramage subsequently signed a three-year contract with Championship side Queens Park Rangers on a free transfer on 13 May 2008.

He made his debut for the club, starting the whole game, in a 2–1 win against Barnsley in the opening game of the season. Since joining Queens Park Rangers, Ramage quickly established himself in the starting line–up, playing in the centre–back position. However, he suffered an injury that saw him miss three matches. But Ramage made his return to the starting line–up against Cardiff City on 8 November 2008 and set up a goal for Gavin Mahon to score the only goal of the game, winning 1–0. After not playing for two months, Ramage made his return to the starting line–up against Doncaster Rovers on 10 March 2009, as the club lost 2–0. This was followed up by helping Queens Park Rangers keep two clean sheets in the next two matches. At the end of the 2008–09 season, he went on to make thirty–four appearances in all competitions.

On the opening day of the 2009–10 season, Ramage scored his first professional goal, against Blackpool; as the club drew 1–1 and also won the Man of the Match Award. A week later on 25 August 2009, he set up a goal for Hogan Ephraim, who scored the opening goal of the game, in a 2–1 win against Accrington Stanley in the second round of the League Cup. Since the start of the 2009–10 season, Ramage found himself in and out of the starting eleven, as he was placed on the substitute bench. He then scored his second goal of the season, in a 2–2 draw against Preston North End on 27 March 2010. However, Ramage was sent–off on two occasions during the 2009–10 season, coming against Peterborough United on 6 February 2010 and Newcastle United on 2 May 2010. At the end of the 2009–10 season, he went on to make thirty–six appearances and scoring two times in all competitions.

Having served Queens Park Rangers' first two matches of the 2010–11 season, Ramage made his first appearance of the season, coming on as a 50th-minute substitute, in a 3–0 win against Sheffield United on 14 August 2010. However, during a 2–2 draw against Middlesbrough on 11 September 2010, he suffered a knock, but played for the rest of the game. After the match, it was revealed that Ramage suffered a knee injury and was sidelined for the rest of the 2010–11 season. But he managed to recover and made his first appearance in seven months, coming on as a late substitute, in a 2–0 win against Watford on 30 April 2011, a win that saw the club promoted to the Premier League. In a follow–up match, Ramage made another appearance for Queens Park Rangers, also coming on as a substitute, in a 2–1 loss against Leeds United. At the end of the 2010–11 season, he went on to make four appearances in all competitions. Following this, Ramage signed a new one-year deal at Queens Park Rangers. Upon signing a contract, he said: "I always wanted to stay here and the gaffer made it clear the day I got injured that he'd give me a chance. It's now up to me to repay the faith he's shown in me. I feel I've got a point to prove and a lot to offer this football club. I've got to repay the gaffer. He's been good to me, now it's my turn to prove he made the right decision. Hopefully I can impress during games and give him a tough decision. I'm probably at the back of the queue but I'm mentally strong enough to try and force my way in."

Upon returning to his parent club in January, Ramage appeared as an unused substitute for a match against Wigan Athletic on 21 January 2012, winning 3–1. However, by February, he was dropped from the 25 man Premier League squad and was told by the club's management of being available to a new club. At the end of the 2011–12 season, Ramage was one of eight players to be released.

==== Loan spells ====
On 5 August 2011, Ramage went out on a month-long loan at Crystal Palace. He made his debut for the club, starting the whole game, in a 2–1 loss against Peterborough United in the opening game of the season. After producing a good performance throughout August, Ramage's loan spell with Crystal Palace was later extended until 15 January 2012. However, he found himself in and out of the starting line–up, playing in either right–back position, centre–back position and left–back position. In mid–January, his loan spell with the club ended on 15 January 2012. By the time Ramage left Crystal Palace, he went on to make twenty–three appearances in all competitions.

On 29 February 2012, Ramage signed for Championship club Birmingham City on an emergency loan until the end of the season. He made his debut for the club, starting the whole game, in a 2–2 draw against Derby County on 3 March 2012. In a follow–up match against Coventry City, Ramage set up an equalising goal for Marlon King to help Birmingham City draw 1–1. Since joining the club, he quickly established himself in the first team, playing in either the left–back position and right–back position. Ramage made three separate statements on helping Birmingham City reach the play–offs and aim to help the club reach the Premier League, as he previously did with Queens Park Rangers. However, Ramage played in both legs of the semi–finals of the Championship play–offs against Blackpool, as Birmingham City lost 3–2 against Blackpool on aggregate. Having played in every match since joining the club throughout the 2011–12 season, he went on to make sixteen appearances. Following this, Ramage returned to his parent club.

=== Crystal Palace ===
After being released by Queens Park Rangers, Ramage signed for Crystal Palace on a one-year contract on 7 August 2012.

He made his debut for the club, starting the whole game, in a 3–2 win against Exeter City in the first round of the League Cup. Since joining Crystal Palace, Ramage quickly established himself in the first team, a centre back partnership with Damien Delaney. However, during a 3–2 loss against Cardiff City on 22 September 2012, he suffered a thigh injury and was substituted in the 29th minute. After being sidelined for a week, Ramage made his return to the first team, coming on as an 88th-minute substitute, in a 2–1 win against Wolverhampton Wanderers on 2 October 2012. He then scored his first goal for the club, scoring a "power home a header from six yards", in a 2–1 win against Leicester City on 27 October 2012. This was followed up by helping Crystal Palace keep two clean sheets in the next two matches against Blackburn Rovers and Ipswich Town. Ramage scored his second goal for the club, scoring from a header in a 2–1 loss against Leeds United on 24 November 2012. This was followed up by Crystal Palace keeping two clean sheets in the next two matches against Hull City and Brighton & Hove Albion. He then scored his third goal for Crystal Palace, in a 2–2 draw against Watford on 8 February 2013 and this was followed up by scoring his fourth goal for the club, in a 4–1 win against Middlesbrough on 16 February 2013. Ramage continued to be a regular member of the Palace starting eleven over the season until he was dropped to the substitute bench for the rest of the 2012–13 season. Despite this, his contributions saw the club seal their promotion to the Premier League after beating Watford 1–0 in the Football League Championship play-off final. At the end of the 2012–13 season, Ramage went on to make forty–three appearances and scoring four times in all competitions. Following this, he was given a two-year contract extension, keeping him until 2015.

In the 2013–14 season, however, Ramage found his first team place limited following Crystal Palace's return to the Premier League and appeared twice as an unused substitute. But he made his only appearance for the club, starting the whole game, in a 2–1 loss against Bristol City in the second round of the EFL Cup. The 2014–15 season continued to see Ramage's first team opportunities limited and was told by Crystal Palace's management that he would be loaned out. On 22 May 2015, it was announced that the player would not be offered a new contract by Palace at the end of the 2014–15 season.

==== Loan Spells at Barnsley ====
On 2 September 2013, Ramage joined Championship club Barnsley on loan for the season. He made his debut for the club, starting the whole game, in a 2–1 loss against Nottingham Forest on 14 September 2013. Ramage appeared two more matches before suffering a back injury that saw him miss one match. But he made his return to the starting line–up against Reading on 1 October 2013, as Barnsley drew 1–1. However, his return was short–lived when Ramage suffered a thigh injury during a match against Queens Park Rangers on 5 October 2013 and was substituted in the 67th minute, as the club lost 2–0. After the match, he was sidelined for six weeks with a thigh injury. Ramage made his return to the first team from injury, starting the whole game, in a 2–1 win against Brighton & Hove Albion on 5 December 2013. His playing time soon increased following his return from injury and rotated in playing either the centre–back position and right–back position. However, he suffered a hamstring injury during a 3–0 loss against Leicester City on 11 March 2014 and was substituted in the 54th minute. After missing one match, Ramage made his return to the starting line–up against Bournemouth on 22 March 2014 and played 83 minutes before being substituted, as Barnsley lost 1–0. However, his return was short–lived when Ramage suffered a hamstring injury for the second time this season. It wasn't until on 3 May 2014 when he made his return to the starting line–up against Queens Park Rangers, as the club lost 3–2. At the end of the 2013–14 season, which saw Barnsley relegated, Ramage went on to make twenty–five appearances in all competitions.

On 3 October 2014, Ramage, again, signed for Barnsley on a three-month loan deal. He made his second debut for the club against Rochdale the next day and scored his first goal, scoring a header, in a 1–0 win. Since re-joining Barnsley, Ramage quickly regained his first team place, playing in the centre–back position. He then scored his second goal for the club, scoring from a header, in a 3–2 win against Colchester United on 14 November 2014. However, Ramage suffered two separate injuries by the end of the year. On 3 January 2015, his loan spell with Barnsley was extended until the end of the 2014–15 season. However, he suffered an injury during a 2–0 win against Yeovil Town on 10 January 2015 and was substituted in the 27th minute. It wasn't until on 31 January 2015 when Ramage made his return to the starting line–up, in a 2–1 win against Port Vale. He then scored his third goal for the club, in a 2–1 loss against Walsall on 10 February 2015. However, Ramage suffered a thigh injury that kept him out for two months. It wasn't until on 11 April 2015 when he made his return to the starting line–up against Chesterfield and helped Barnsley draw 1–1. At the end of the 2014–15 season, Ramage went on to make twenty–three appearances and scoring three times in all competitions.

=== Kerala Blasters ===
On 24 August 2015, Ramage joined ISL side Kerala Blasters FC for the 2015 tournament. Upon joining the club, he said: "From what I've been hearing, the league are looking to bring in established players at a crossroads in their career. I can't wait. I've had 52,000 passionate Geordies baying for blood, and walking out at Selhurst is just as intimidating. I'm pretty much used to it, but I do think it will be a different experience… it's one I'm really looking forward to."

Ramage captained his first match on his Kerala Blasters' debut against NorthEast United on 6 October 2015, starting the whole game, and setting up the club's second goal of the game, in a 3–1 win. Since joining Kerala Blasters, he captained the club for the rest of the 2015 season, playing all matches of 14 appearances in all competitions as they finished last place in the league.

=== Coventry City ===
On 7 January 2016, Ramage signed for League One club Coventry City until the end of the season. Local newspaper Coventry Telegraph reported that his name became the second footballer to join the club.

He made his debut for Coventry City, starting the whole game, in a 2–0 loss against Burton Albion on 16 January 2016. Ramage made three more starts for the club before being deemed surplus to requirements in the first team. Manager Tony Mowbray explained his decision on his recent first team run ins, saying: "For me, Peter had an opportunity in the three games he played and I watched him very closely, saw what he does. Peter was fantastic on our training pitch because he has a great voice, is a good lad but at this level, the way we like to expend – particularly if we're attacking and chasing the game a little bit – I felt as if he was maybe finding it difficult to play as I wanted when I leave the defenders exposed a bit at times." By the time Ramage was loaned out, he went on to make four appearances in all competitions.

On 17 March 2016, Ramage joined Leyton Orient on a 28-day loan. He made his debut for the club, starting the whole game and kept a clean sheet, in a 1–0 win against Morecambe on 19 March 2016. Following this, Ramage received a number of first team run ins for the rest of the 2015–16 season and extended his loan spell with Leyton Orient along the way. He went on to make eight appearances in all competitions by the time his loan spell with the club ended.

== Coaching career ==
While playing for Crystal Palace, Ramage began taking up coaching badges in hopes of moving to management when his football career ends. In June 2016, he was awarded the UEFA A licence.

=== Arizona United SC/Phoenix Rising FC ===
On 3 August 2016, United Soccer League club Arizona United SC announced that it had signed Ramage. He made his debut for the club on the same day, starting the whole game, in a 3–2 win against Vancouver Whitecaps 2. Since making his debut for Arizona United SC, Ramage received a number of first team run ins for the rest of the 2016 season. At the end of the 2016 season, he went on to make eleven appearances in all competitions.

Ramage was one of four players that transitioned to the renamed Phoenix Rising FC in 2017. He captained the club in their first match, starting the whole game, in a 1–0 loss against Toronto FC II on 25 March 2017. Since joining Phoenix Rising, Ramage became a first team regular, playing in the centre–back position. He then scored his first goal for the club, scoring from a header, in a 4–3 win against Swope Park on 23 April 2017. His second goal for Phoenix Rising came on 27 August 2017 against Sacramento Republic, scoring from a header, in a 3–1 win. At the end of the 2017 season, Ramage went on to make twenty–six appearances and scoring two times in all competitions. On 24 October 2017, he departed the club as a player in October 2017. Shortly, Ramage announced his retirement from professional football.

He was hired as an assistant coach for Phoenix Rising FC on 10 August 2018.

=== Newcastle United ===
On 28 July 2020, Ramage returned to England, where he joined Newcastle United as an assistant coach for their under-23 team. Ramage said about returning to the club: "I have had a great experience out here in Phoenix. They have helped me develop as a coach and now feels like the right time to come back."

== Career statistics ==
As of 10 August 2018

Appearances and goals by club, season and competition
Club	Season	League			National Cup		League Cup		Other		Total	
Club	Season	Division	Apps	Goals	Apps	Goals	Apps	Goals	Apps	Goals	Apps	Goals
Newcastle United	2004–05	Premier League	4	0	0	0	0	0	1 (Note: Appearances in UEFA Cup)	0	5	0
Newcastle United	2005–06	Premier League	23	0	4	0	2	0	0	0	29	0
Newcastle United	2006–07	Premier League	21	0	1	0	3	0	7	0	32	0
Newcastle United	2007–08	Premier League	3	0	0	0	0	0	—		3	0
Newcastle United	Total		51	0	5	0	5	0	8	0	69	0
Queens Park Rangers	2008–09	Championship	31	0	1	0	2	0	—		34	0
Queens Park Rangers	2009–10	Championship	33	2	2	0	1	0	—		36	2
Queens Park Rangers	2010–11	Championship	4	0	0	0	0	0	—		4	0
Queens Park Rangers	2011–12	Premier League	0	0	—		—		—		0	0
Queens Park Rangers	Total		68	2	3	0	3	0	—		74	2
Crystal Palace (loan)	2011–12	Championship	17	0	1	0	5	0	—		23	0
Birmingham City (loan)	2011–12	Championship	14	0	—		—		2 (Note: Appearances in Football League play-offs)	0	16	0
Crystal Palace	2012–13	Championship	40	4	2	0	1	0	—		43	4
Crystal Palace	2013–14	Premier League	0	0	—		1	0	—		1	0
Crystal Palace	2014–15	Premier League	0	0	—		0	0	—		0	0
Crystal Palace	Total		40	4	2	0	2	0	—		44	4
Barnsley (loan)	2013–14	Championship	24	0	1	0	—		—		25	0
Barnsley (loan)	2014–15	League One	19	3	4	0	—		—		23	3
Barnsley (loan)	Total		43	3	5	0	—		—		48	3
Kerala Blasters	2015	Indian Super League	14	0	—		—		—		14	0
Coventry City	2015–16	League One	4	0	0	0	—		—		4	0
Leyton Orient (loan)	2015–16	League Two	8	0	0	0	—		—		8	0
Arizona United SC	2016	United Soccer League	11	0	—	—	—		—		11	0
Phoenix Rising FC	2017	United Soccer League	25	2	—	—	—		—		25	2
Career total			295	11	16	0	15	0	10	0	336	11

== Honours ==
Queens Park Rangers

- Football League Championship: 2010–11

Crystal Palace

- Football League Championship play-offs: 2013
