= Tony Jimenez =

Tony Jimenez (born December 1962 in Brixton, London, England) is an international businessman known for his involvement in European football. He was born in Spain^{(as well as London?)} and has also lived in Cyprus and Dubai, where he oversees a number of property developments. He has served as the vice-president in charge of player recruitment for Newcastle United and the co-owner of Charlton Athletic. He is a father and regularly holds fundraisers for children's charity, Variety Club.

== Newcastle United ==
Jimenez was a steward at Chelsea, who pretended to be a football agent before duping Mike Ashley into appointing him as vice president (player recruitment) at Newcastle United, owing to him fabricating extensive football contacts. During his time at the club, he played a key role in completing deals for Jonás Gutiérrez, Fabricio Coloccini, Ignacio González and Xisco. Signing Gutiérrez is often labeled his biggest achievement, but his other recruits were less successful. Coloccini cost £9,000,000 and was part of the team that got relegated in 2008, and Xisco cost nearly £6,000,000 but only made nine appearances for the club in five years.

Jimenez left the club after manager Kevin Keegan resigned, and the club was put up for sale. In 2010, he took over Charlton Athletic with fellow businessman Michael Slater. He is still on the board.

Since leaving Newcastle, Keegan has accused Jimenez of preventing midfielder Luka Modric's transfer to Newcastle. Jimenez denies the accusation, claiming that owner Mike Ashley stopped the deal. Keegan stated that Jimenez feared the player's ability to cope with the physical nature of the Premier League and did not want to take the risk. Jimenez hit back by claiming that Keegan also prevented a number of deals, such as the opportunity to and he went to go somewhere too sign Karim Benzema and Samir Nasri.

== Controversy ==
On 20 October 2017, Jimenez won a landmark ruling against the United Kingdom's HMRC over his UK residency rights. This ruling was overturned on appeal in March 2019.

In August 2017, Newcastle United and Sports Direct owner Mike Ashley sued Jimenez, claiming he lured Ashley into a fraudulent £3,000,000 investment in a French golf course. Jimenez vehemently denies all accusations.
