= Mark Cook (footballer) =

English footballer

Personal information
- Date of birth: 7 September 1988 (age 38)
- Place of birth: North Shields, England
- Position: Goalkeeper

Youth career
- –2007: Newcastle United

Senior career*
Years	Team	Apps	(Gls)
2007–2008	Newcastle United	0	(0)
2008–2010	Hartlepool United	0	(0)
2010	Gateshead	0	(0)
2010–2012	Harrogate Town	53	(0)
2012	Universitario	2	(0)
2013	Blyth Spartans	28	(0)
Total		83	(0)
- * Club domestic league appearances and goals as of 14:25, 7 May 2017 (UTC)

Mark Cook (born 7 September 1988) is an English footballer who plays as goalkeeper. He is one of a very small number of English players to have played professionally in South America, after playing two games for Peruvian club Universitario in 2012.

== Career ==
Cook came through the youth system at Newcastle United, and was later contracted to Hartlepool United and Gateshead, though he did not play a senior game for any of these clubs. In October 2010, he signed for Harrogate Town, where he kept 17 clean sheets in 61 games.

=== Move to Peru ===
In July 2012, Cook was contacted by Universitario manager Nolberto Solano, who like Cook, played for Newcastle United and Hartlepool United. Cook signed for Universitario in August among much media attention. He played two games in the Peruvian Primera División for the club, making his debut in a 0–1 home defeat to Sport Huancayo on 1 September, and then played in a 3–0 away defeat against Cobresol on 16 September. Solano departed as Universitario manager on 12 December 2012, and this marked the end of Cook's short spell with the club. Upon his return to England Mark signed for Northern Premier League side Blyth Spartans, making his debut in a 2–1 defeat against FC United of Manchester at Gigg Lane. Cook made a handful of appearances for Blyth before leaving at the end of the season.
