= Freddy Shepherd =

British businessman (1941–2017)

- Born: 29 October 1941; Gilsland, Northumberland, England
- Died: 25 September 2017 (aged 75); Jesmond, Newcastle upon Tyne, England
- Occupation: Businessman

Freddy Shepherd (29 October 1941 – 25 September 2017) was an English businessman and the chairman of Newcastle United football club from 1997 until 2007.

During his time at Newcastle, both as an active assistant to and later replacement of Sir John Hall as chairman for ten years, Shepherd proved an often outspoken and controversial figure, at times alienating the club's support.

== Life and career ==
Freddy Shepherd was born in Gilsland, Northumberland into a working class home, the son of a lorry driver; and with his brother Bruce, he expanded a road haulage business into a number of marine and related businesses. He also engaged in property development through redevelopment of the former ship facilities along the River Tyne. The assets of the company now include Mitford Hall.

The Shepherd brothers often worked with Sir John Hall, who owned the property development business Cameron Hall Developments, and who had become a key share-holder in Newcastle United. After Hall's vision of building Newcastle into a sporting club along the lines of A.S. Roma or FC Barcelona, he looked to consolidate the operations of Newcastle United. Shepherd Offshore had started to build a holding in Newcastle United, and so Shepherd became involved in the football business, alongside Hall's son Douglas Hall.

== Newcastle United ==
Initially, Shepherd became involved with the consolidation of the Newcastle sporting club to just Newcastle United, selling or reducing Hall's controlling stakes in: Newcastle Falcons rugby team, Newcastle Eagles basketball team; and the then Newcastle Cobras ice hockey team.

In 1996, Shepherd was tasked by Hall with bringing Alan Shearer to the club, which he did for a-then world record fee. The confidence Shepherd showed in completing the deal persuaded Hall, who wanted to retire to Spain, to effectively offload the day-to-day running of the club to Shepherd as chairman, and his son Douglas as the active Hall family member on the board. Bruce Shepherd continued to run Shepherd Offshore, while Freddie Shepherd became chairman of Newcastle United F. C.

=== Finances ===
Shepherd owned almost all of his Newcastle shares through Shepherd Offshore. Unlike the Halls, who had been steadily selling off their shares since flotation in 1997, the Shepherds increased their holding. They owned 28.01% of the club, up from about 22% in April 2005. Since 1997, the Shepherds have made £8,351,298 from Newcastle United, £5,489,239 in share dividends and £2,862,059 in salaries. In 2005, Shepherd's annual salary from the club was £552,954.

=== News of the World exposé ===
In March 1998, Shepherd and Douglas Hall were the target of a News of the World exposé, led by the "Fake Sheikh" Mazher Mahmood. The pair, believing Mahmood to be a wealthy Arab prince trying to set up a business deal, were caught mocking the club's own supporters for spending extortionate amounts of money on merchandise, calling female supporters "dogs", and mocking star striker Alan Shearer by calling him the "Mary Poppins of football", all while frequenting a brothel.

Amidst heavy media coverage, the Newcastle Independent Supporters Association and the then Minister for Sport, Tony Banks, called for the resignation of the pair. Although reports from sources close to Shepherd initially indicated he was contractually unable to resign, he and Hall had both left their posts within two weeks of the scandal breaking.

His general approach to running the club, as well as the ongoing fallout from the News of the World story, earned Shepherd a number of unflattering nicknames such as "Fatty Shepherd", the "Fat Controller" and "Baron Greenback".

Only ten months after resigning, Shepherd and Hall, the majority shareholders at Newcastle, voted themselves back on to the board. This led to the immediate resignation of the PLC chairman David Cassidy, who had taken the position just six months earlier. Shepherd then went on to take over as PLC chairman.

=== Sacking of Bobby Robson ===
In August 2004, Shepherd fired manager Sir Bobby Robson four games into the new season. In the week before the sacking, Shepherd was quoted as saying that Robson would not be offered a new deal at the end of the season, and that Robson would be "in the Guinness Book of Records" if he were still the manager at 73 years old.

It is unclear if Shepherd made his statement after consulting Robson, but Robson admitted that he had an agreement with the club that he would retire at the end of the season. Robson also stressed that there was an agreement that he would not be sacked. Shepherd said that sacking Robson was "the hardest thing I have ever done in my life", adding "I didn’t want to be known as the man who shot Bambi."

In his 2005 autobiography Sir Bobby Robson provided detailed criticism of Shepherd's chairmanship, claiming that while manager he was denied information regarding the players' contracts and transfer negotiations. He also criticised Shepherd and Douglas Hall, the club's deputy chairman, for their focus only on the first team and St James' Park, causing them to neglect less glamorous, although equally important, areas such as the training ground, youth development and talent scouts. The club's training ground has been notorious in the past for its unkempt state and for causing injuries to first team players.

=== Newcastle supporter protest ===
Following the defeat to Sheffield United on 4 November 2006, more than 2,000 fans protested outside St James' Park, calling for his resignation. Websites such as True Faith and United For Change led a supporter campaign against him. Protests were again held after the club's defeat to Blackburn Rovers on 5 May 2007, after which Glenn Roeder resigned.

=== Michael Owen rumours ===
In May 2007, shortly after sacking Roeder as manager of the club, Shepherd attacked Michael Owen's adviser for revealing a clause in his contract which said that he could be sold for £9 million if the club failed to qualify for Europe. He alleged that they were trying to engineer his sale to one of the four leading clubs in the Premier League, preferably Liverpool or Manchester United.

On 11 May 2007, Shepherd was filmed joking with friend and Geordie con artist Steve MacNeish through his car window, stating that Owen himself was not the problem and that his advisers were the ones causing upheaval. The video was later published on YouTube.

=== Sale of Newcastle United ===
In May 2007, Shepherd was shocked to learn that billionaire businessman Mike Ashley had purchased the Hall family's 41.6% shareholding for £55m.

This followed numerous previous bid negotiations from which nothing had materialised. Under Stock Exchange rules Ashley then had to submit an offer for the remaining shares. Should he go over 50%, Shepherd would no longer be in control of the club and Ashley would be able to replace the board. Shepherd initially came out fighting, but later agreed to meet with Ashley and the board on 29 May. On 7 June 2007, Mike Ashley had a bid accepted by Freddy Shepherd to buy his shares and in his role as chairman of the board Shepherd also advised the remaining shareholders to sell to Ashley.

Shepherd had been suffering from poor health over the previous six months, resulting in hospitalisation due to pneumonia and a collapsed lung, he was being treated at the time the Hall family publicly announced the sale of their shares to Ashley. On 24 July 2007, it was announced that Shepherd was stepping down with immediate effect, to be replaced by deputy chairman Chris Mort.

=== Reported 2009 bid to regain ownership ===
Following Newcastle's relegation and the announcement by Mike Ashley that the club was up for sale, Shepherd was instantly linked with a possible buy-out. Shepherd had said, "never say never" on the issue of re-buying Newcastle, and on 30 June 2009 it was reported that Shepherd had launched a £60 million bid to buy the club from Ashley. On 1 November 2010, reports circulated that Shepherd was planning on making an offer for the club and returning to Newcastle as owner three years after selling it. This was later denied by the club; however, Shepherd would not comment on the matter.

== Death ==
Shepherd died in his sleep at his home in Jesmond on 25 September 2017. He was 75 years old.
