= Albert Luque =

Spanish retired footballer (born 1978)

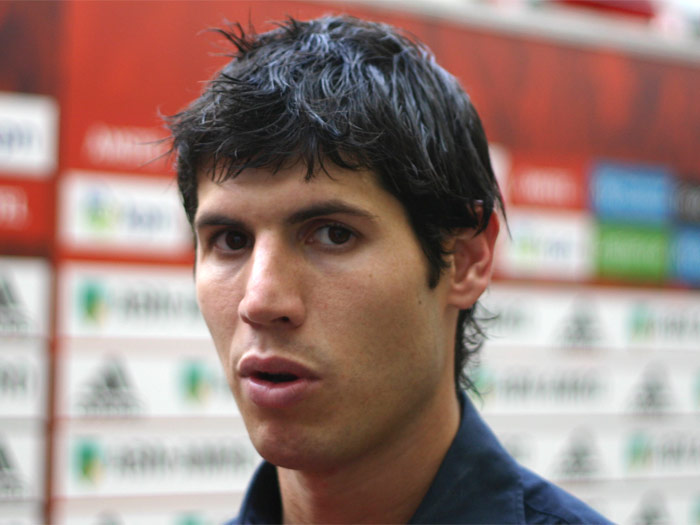
- Luque with Ajax in 2007

Personal information
- Full name: Albert Luque Martos
- Date of birth: 11 March 1978 (age 48)
- Place of birth: Terrassa, Spain
- Height: 1.83 m (6 ft 0 in)
- Positions: Winger; striker

Youth career
- 1985–1991: Can Parellada
- 1991–1996: Barcelona

Senior career*
Years	Team	Apps	(Gls)
1996–1997	Barcelona C		
1997–1999	Mallorca B	62	(25)
1999–2002	Mallorca	67	(24)
1999–2000	→ Málaga (loan)	23	(3)
2002–2005	Deportivo La Coruña	101	(26)
2005–2007	Newcastle United	21	(1)
2007–2009	Ajax	16	(4)
2008–2009	→ Málaga (loan)	32	(8)
2009–2011	Málaga	19	(1)
Total		341	(92)

International career
1998–2000	Spain U21	13	(3)
2000	Spain U23	2	(0)
2002–2005	Spain	17	(2)
2002–2006	Catalonia	3	(2)
Medal record
Men's Football
Representing Spain
Olympic Games
Silver medal – second place	2000 Sydney	Team competition
- * Club domestic league appearances and goals

Albert Luque Martos (born 11 March 1978) is a Spanish former professional footballer who played as a left winger or striker.

His 15-year career was mainly associated with Mallorca and Deportivo, and he amassed La Liga totals of 248 matches and 61 goals over 11 seasons. He also had spells in the English Premier League with Newcastle United and the Dutch Eredivisie with Ajax.

A Spain international in the first half of the 2000s, Luque represented the nation at the 2002 World Cup and Euro 2004.

== Club career ==
=== Mallorca ===
Born in Terrassa, Barcelona, Catalonia, Luque was a lifelong supporter of FC Barcelona, and started out in football on trial with them, but was released by the C team when he was 19. He was then taken by RCD Mallorca and assigned to their reserves, but eventually broke into the main squad after a successful loan spell at Málaga CF.

In 2000–01, Luque scored nine goals for Mallorca, helping the Balearic Islands side qualify for the UEFA Champions League for the first time in their history after finishing third. His extra time goal in the third qualifying round against HNK Hajduk Split carried the team into the first group stage.

=== Deportivo ===
Luque was transferred to Deportivo de La Coruña on 29 August 2002, in an eight-year deal worth €15 million (approximately £10 million), for strikers José Flores and Walter Pandiani (on loan). In his first season at Depor, he scored the winner against former club Málaga with a bicycle kick, adding further goals in 2–1 victories over Racing de Santander and RCD Espanyol; he netted seven times in La Liga during the campaign, mostly from substitute appearances.

2003–04 saw Luque firmly established as a starter, as he scored the winner against Rosenborg BK in the Champions League qualifying round, the only goal over both legs. He also netted in the knockout stages against Juventus FC and AC Milan, and added 11 more on the domestic front in his final year in Galicia.

=== Newcastle United ===
On 27 August 2005, Luque was sold to Newcastle United for a fee of £9 million, signing a five-year contract. He made his debut against Manchester United at St James' Park, which included having a goal ruled out for offside. However, in his next game, he suffered a hamstring injury while playing at Fulham; upon his return he was used in a number of roles, including left midfielder, failing to live up to his large price tag.

On 17 April 2006, Luque scored his first goal for Newcastle in the Tyne–Wear derby, when he broke free from the Sunderland defence and chipped the ball over Kelvin Davis. He commented after the match that he hoped to score before the end of the season, but played no part in the remaining fixtures, however.

Luque's first competitive home goal came against Lillestrom S.K. at the start of the team's UEFA Intertoto Cup tournament– he added two in a 4–1 defeat of Liverpool's reserves in October. After having fallen low in the side's attacking pecking order, a number of injuries awarded him a start against Serie A table-toppers U.S. Città di Palermo on 2 November, in the UEFA Cup, and rewarded manager Glenn Roeder's choice scoring the game's only goal with a header. After that, however, the player had few significant first-team appearances, by now behind the likes of youth graduate Matty Pattison; in the January 2007 transfer window he was linked with a loan move to PSV Eindhoven, but the deal fell through in spite of his wishes.

On 23 June 2007, new Magpies manager Sam Allardyce stated that he would be willing to give Luque a proper chance to impress. However, this did not prevent the former from awarding the latter's number 7 shirt to new signing Joey Barton, which initially left the Spaniard without a squad number. He was eventually given the number 19 jersey he previously wore at Deportivo, and which Titus Bramble last used at Newcastle.

His transfer from Deportivo to Newcastle is one of those about which the Stevens inquiry report in June 2007 expressed concerns:

"There remains inconsistencies in evidence provided by Graeme Souness – a former manager of the club"

"The inquiry still has unanswered questions relating to possible payments made by agent Francis Martin, who Newcastle officials believed was working for the selling club." At the end of the next month, AFC Ajax agreed a fee to sign Luque.

=== Ajax ===
On 25 August 2007, Ajax confirmed they had signed Luque until 2010. On 30 September, he scored his first two goals for the Amsterdam team, turning the scoreline around in two minutes against VVV-Venlo in an eventual 6–1 home win but coming out injured slightly afterwards.

Luque was fined after a game with Feyenoord in November 2007 for a half-time altercation in the changing rooms with teammate Luis Suárez, which caused manager Adrie Koster to substitute them both before the second half. It was reported in July 2008 that the former had no future at Ajax; technical director Danny Blind told Sportweek: "Ajax has told Luque that he has to leave the club. I told Albert myself that we don't want to go on with him and if I've told it to him, I really don't know who else I should inform."

=== Return to Málaga ===
Just before the 1 September transfer deadline of 2008–09, Luque signed a one-year loan deal with Málaga, returning to Andalusia nine years after his loan spell at the club. On 30 November 2008, he came from the bench to open his scoring account in his second spell, in a 4–2 home victory over CA Osasuna, and was a crucial attacking element as the club fought for UEFA Cup qualification until the final days of the season.

On 30 July 2009, after lengthy negotiations, Málaga signed Luque from Ajax on a free transfer. Under new coach Juan Ramón López Muñiz, he played mainly from the bench and scored only once in the first half of the campaign, thereafter being dropped for almost a month; after returning to first-team action, he replaced Duda in the 85th minute of a 3–0 win at Racing Santander.

In 2010–11, Luque continued to be absent from Málaga's lineups, both under Jesualdo Ferreira and his successor Manuel Pellegrini. In December 2010, he was deemed surplus to requirements alongside five other players, with his release confirmed on 4 January 2011.

== International career ==
Luque represented Spain at the 2000 Summer Olympics, playing twice as the national team won silver in Sydney. After a successful season at Mallorca, still uncapped for the senior team, he was called up to the squad for the 2002 FIFA World Cup, making his international debut in a 3–2 group stage win against South Africa on 12 June 2002, and also appeared in the round-of-16 victory over the Republic of Ireland.

Two years later, Luque played at UEFA Euro 2004, being used as a left winger in the 1–0 defeat to hosts Portugal. His last game was on 7 September 2005, in a 2006 World Cup qualifier against Serbia and Montenegro.

=== International goals ===
Scores and results list Spain's goal tally first, score column indicates score after each Luque goal.

List of international goals scored by Albert Luque
No.	Date	Venue	Opponent	Score	Result	Competition
1	9 October 2004	El Sardinero, Santander, Spain	Belgium	1–0	2–0	2006 World Cup qualification
2	4 June 2005	Mestalla, Valencia, Spain	Lithuania	1–0	1–0	2006 World Cup qualification

== Managerial career ==
On 29 April 2019, Luque joined president Luis Rubiales' staff at the Royal Spanish Football Federation. In December 2022, he was appointed as its sporting director in place of José Francisco Molina, following a last-16 elimination at the 2022 World Cup.

In 2023, Luque was named as a defendant in the Rubiales affair case, as he was accused of being among those who coerce Jenni Hermoso to reduce her pressure on Rubiales following the controversial kiss she received from Rubiales after winning the 2023 Women's World Cup. Although he was not part of the coaching staff, it was determined that he sought to reduce pressure on Rubiales and his status in the case would be upgraded from witness to suspect on 27 September. Despite his denial, evidence was shown that he used his WhatsApp account to try to get a friend of the player to convince her to reduce pressure on the chairman.

== Personal life ==
In November 2006, while driving to Newcastle International Airport for a UEFA Cup game away to Eintracht Frankfurt, Luque pulled his Porsche Cayenne over due to a puncture. Shortly after he got out the car to make a telephone call, the empty vehicle was struck by a lorry and destroyed. He managed to get a flight to Germany and played in the match.

== Honours ==
Newcastle United

- UEFA Intertoto Cup: 2006

Spain U23

- Summer Olympic Games: silver medal 2000
