= Jeff Vetere =

English football coach

Personal information
- Date of birth: 1966 (age 59–60)
- Place of birth: England

Youth career
- Years: Team
- Luton Town

Jeff Vetere (born 1966) is an English football youth coach, scout and technical co-ordinator. He has also worked for the Premier League. Vetere is credited with an encyclopaedic knowledge of footballers and is fluent in several languages including Spanish, French and Italian.

== Life and career ==
Vetere's playing career began as an apprentice at Luton Town where he later coached in the youth set-up before moving to Rushden & Diamonds where he was brought in by manager Brian Talbot in 1997 and put in charge of the newly established youth academy.

Vetere moved on to Charlton Athletic where his official role became overseas coordinator but day-to-day involvement included working with the first team. Vetere scouted Cristiano Ronaldo for Charlton in 2002 while he was playing for Sporting Lisbon and Portugal under-21s, although he eventually signed with Manchester United instead. The full-back Grant Basey, who broke into Charlton's first team in 2007 at the age of 19, has credited Vetere with his development.

Alan Curbishley had worked with Vetere at Charlton and brought him to West Ham United in January 2007.

"I was not surprised that Jeff [Vetere] ended up at Real Madrid because the guy is a walking encyclopedia of footballing knowledge. Mention the name of any footballer and he will tell you who he has played for, how many goals he has scored and even what size boots he wears."

— Andy Burgess

Vetere was snapped up by Real Madrid at the end of the 2007 season to work under the technical director, Miguel Ángel Portugal, and the club's director of international football, the former FC Barcelona and Rayo Vallecano goalkeeper Julen Lopetegui. His role was to help the Spanish club scout and sign the best talents across the world. Vetere's final piece of business at Real Madrid was securing a deal for Ghana U17 fullback Daniel Opare ahead of Liverpool in January 2008.

Vetere was recruited from Real Madrid and appointed as Newcastle United's technical co-ordinator in January 2008 to complete a continental-style management structure working to assist Kevin Keegan.

Vetere was appointed as chief scout of Aston Villa by manager Gérard Houllier in November 2010.

He later worked as international scout for Fulham.

He joined EFL Championship club Birmingham City as director of football in May 2017, and left the club in March 2018 when manager Steve Cotterill was dismissed with the team in the relegation zone.

In September 2022, Vetere, a close friend of Tottenham Hotspur's managing director of football Fabio Paratici, joined him at Tottenham, taking on the role of a scout. Vetere left the club in February 2023 after he appeared to reveal on Colombian TV that Tottenham were interested in Colombian goalkeeper Kevin Mier.
