= Chris Mort =

English lawyer and former chairman of Newcastle United Football Club

- Occupation: Lawyer
- Employer: Freshfields Bruckhaus Deringer
- Known for: Former chairman of Newcastle United

Christopher Mort is an English lawyer and former chairman of Newcastle United Football Club.

== Biography ==
Mort is a lawyer for Freshfields Bruckhaus Deringer, where he is head of their sports and gaming practice.

Mort worked for Mike Ashley on his takeover of Newcastle United, and took over as chairman of the club on 24 July 2007. Mort sacked manager Sam Allardyce and appointed Kevin Keegan as his successor in January 2008.

Mort set up the Newcastle United Foundation to lead on the club's charitable work in the north-east and rebuilt the club's relationship with children and families.

He left the club in June 2008 and was replaced by Derek Llambias in the role of managing director.

Mort was linked by the media with a return to Newcastle after being spotted at several games. It was claimed, in January 2020, that he had been asked by Amanda Staveley to lead negotiations in connection with a possible Saudi-backed takeover of the club.
