= 2001–02 Newcastle United F.C. season =

Newcastle United
2001–02 season
- Chairman: Freddy Shepherd
- Manager: Sir Bobby Robson
- Stadium: St. James' Park
- Premier League: 4th
- FA Cup: Sixth round
- League Cup: Fifth round
- Intertoto Cup: Finalists
- Top goalscorer: League: Alan Shearer (23); All: Alan Shearer (27)
- Average home league attendance: 51,373
Home colours	Away colours

In the 2001–02 season, English professional football club Newcastle United played in the Premier League, finishing fourth.

== Season summary ==
For Bobby Robson's first two seasons as manager, the club remained in the bottom half of the table; however, during this period, Robson had built up an exciting young squad. He felt that his side could aim for eighth place in the final table as the season began

Newcastle reached an Inter-Toto Cup final early in the season against Troyes, which they lost on away goals after a 4–4 draw at home. They were soon looking like unlikely contenders for the Premiership title after they spent Christmas at the top of the table. Players such as Kieron Dyer (a Ruud Gullit signing), Craig Bellamy and Laurent Robert ensured the team were capable of once again punching their weight in the league. Newcastle achieved qualification for the lucrative Champions' League, finishing in fourth place.

This brought renewed hope for the club after four seasons of struggle; though, in the end, Newcastle fell short of winning the title that they had coveted since 1927. Nonetheless, fourth place was their highest since 1997, securing Champions League football for only the second time in the club's history.

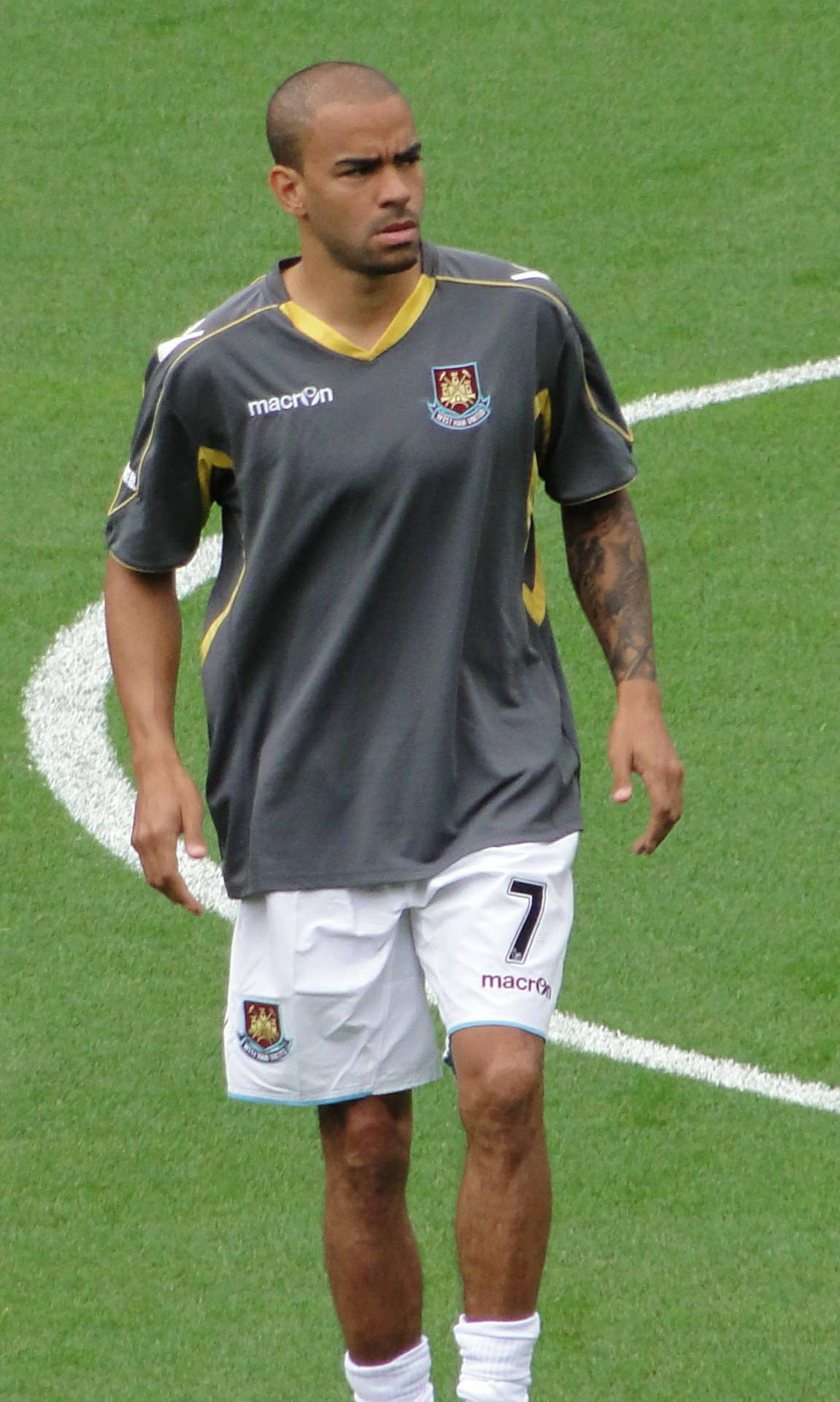
Kieron Dyer

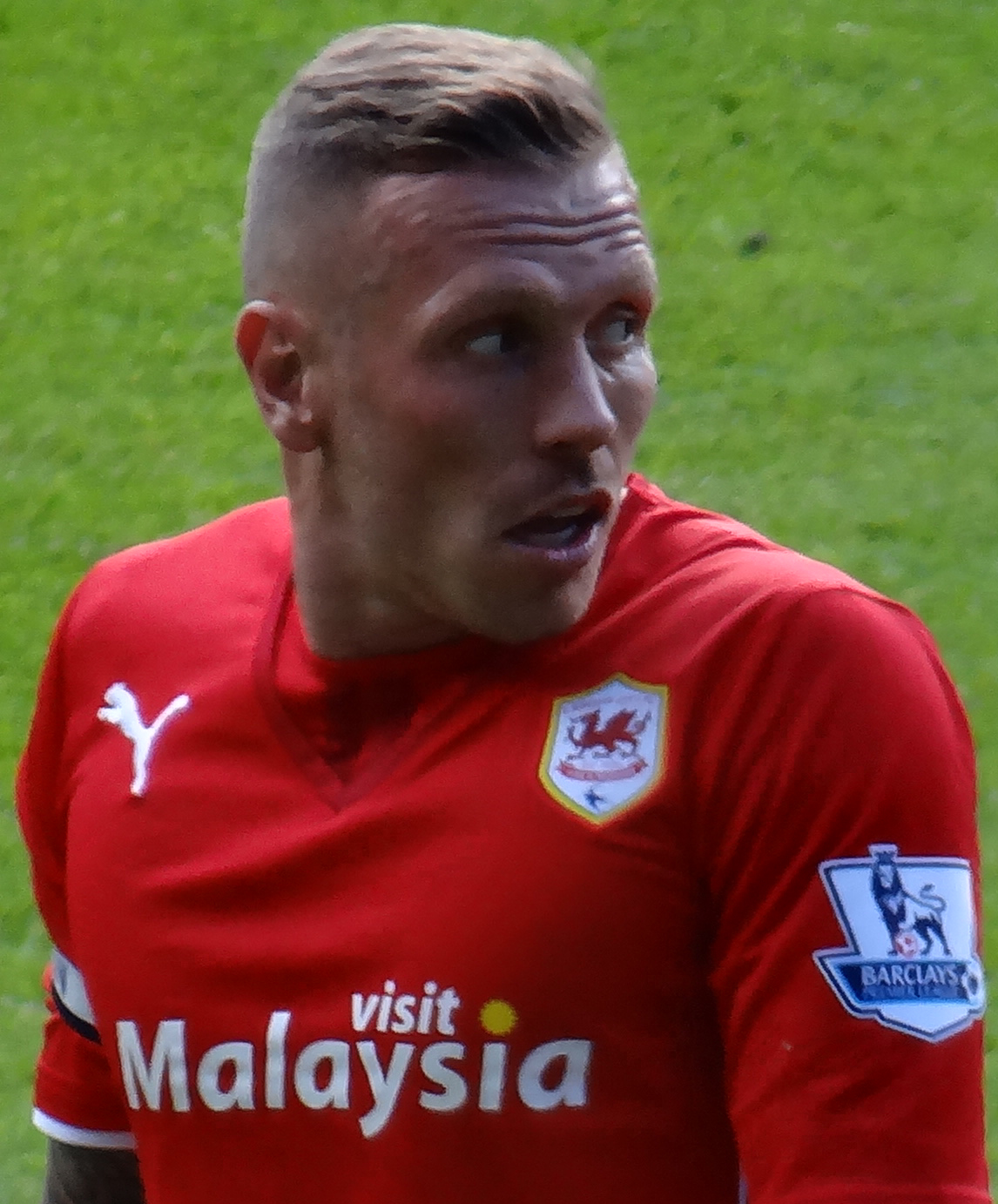
Craig Bellamy

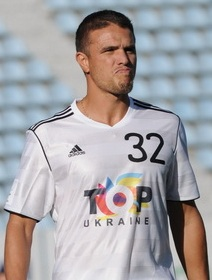
Laurent Robert

== Final league table ==
Pos	Team	Pld	W	D	L	GF	GA	GD	Pts	Qualification or relegation
2	Liverpool	38	24	8	6	67	30	+37	80	Qualification for the Champions League first group stage
3	Manchester United	38	24	5	9	87	45	+42	77	Qualification for the Champions League third qualifying round
4	Newcastle United	38	21	8	9	74	52	+22	71	Qualification for the Champions League third qualifying round
5	Leeds United	38	18	12	8	53	37	+16	66	Qualification for the UEFA Cup first round (Note: Since Arsenal qualified for the Champions League, their UEFA Cup place as FA Cup winners defaulted to Chelsea, the losing finalists.)
6	Chelsea	38	17	13	8	66	38	+28	64	Qualification for the UEFA Cup first round

Source: Premier League
Rules for classification: 1) points; 2) goal difference; 3) number of goals scored.

== Club transfers ==
=== In ===
Date	Pos.	Name	From	Fee
June 2001	FW	(Wales) Craig Bellamy	(England) Coventry City	£6,000,000
July 2001	DF	(England) Robbie Elliott	(England) Bolton Wanderers	Free
1 August 2001	MF	(France) Laurent Robert	(France) PSG	£9,500,000
11 September 2001	DF	(France) Sylvain Distin	(France) PSG	£500,000 (loan fee)
4 February 2002	MF	(England) Jermaine Jenas	(England) Nottingham Forest	£5,000,000

- Total spending: ▼£21m

=== Out ===
Date	Pos.	Name	To	Fee
May 2001	MF	(England) Des Hamilton	(Wales) Cardiff City	Free
May 2001	MF	(Scotland) Stephen Glass	(England) Watford	Free
May 2001	FW	(Scotland) Kevin Gallacher	(England) Preston North End	Free
May 2001	MF	(Argentina) Daniel Cordone	(Argentina) Racing Club	Loan ended
May 2001	DF	(England) Carl Serrant	-	Retired
January 2002	MF	(Argentina) Christian Bassedas	(Spain) Tenerife	Loan
1 February 2002	DF	(England) Warren Barton	(England) Derby County	Nominal
7 February 2002	MF	(England) Rob Lee	(England) Derby County	Undisclosed
March 2002	DF	(England) David Beharall	(England) Oldham Athletic	£150,000

- Total spending: ▲£0.15m

== Players ==
=== First-team squad ===
Note: Flags indicate national team as defined under FIFA eligibility rules; some limited exceptions apply. Players may hold more than one non-FIFA nationality.

No.	Pos.	Nation	Player
1	GK	IRL	Shay Given
2	DF	ENG	Warren Barton
3	DF	ENG	Robbie Elliott
4	MF	PER	Nolberto Solano
5	DF	IRL	Andy O'Brien
6	MF	CHI	Clarence Acuña
7	MF	ENG	Rob Lee
7	MF	ENG	Jermaine Jenas
8	MF	ENG	Kieron Dyer
9	FW	ENG	Alan Shearer (captain)
10	MF	ARG	Christian Bassedas
11	MF	WAL	Gary Speed
12	DF	ENG	Andy Griffin

No.	Pos.	Nation	Player
13	GK	ENG	Steve Harper
14	DF	ENG	Wayne Quinn
16	FW	ENG	Carl Cort
17	FW	WAL	Craig Bellamy
18	DF	NIR	Aaron Hughes
20	FW	COD	Lomana LuaLua
22	MF	ENG	Jamie McClen
23	FW	ENG	Shola Ameobi
24	DF	FRA	Sylvain Distin
25	MF	SCO	Brian Kerr
32	MF	FRA	Laurent Robert
34	DF	GRE	Nikos Dabizas
35	DF	FRA	Olivier Bernard

=== Reserve squad ===
The following players did not appear for the first-team this season.

Note: Flags indicate national team as defined under FIFA eligibility rules; some limited exceptions apply. Players may hold more than one non-FIFA nationality.

No.	Pos.	Nation	Player
15	DF	ESP	Marcelino
21	MF	PAR	Diego Gavilán
26	MF	ENG	James Coppinger
27	DF	ENG	David Beharall
29	GK	NED	John Karelse
30	DF	SCO	Steven Caldwell
31	MF	ENG	Stuart Green
33	MF	POR	Pedro Dimas

No.	Pos.	Nation	Player
36	DF	SCO	Gary Caldwell
37	FW	SCO	Colin McMenamin
38	MF	SCO	Ryan McGuffie
39	MF	ENG	Mark Boyd
40	DF	ENG	David Cowan
—	GK	ENG	Phil Pringle
—	GK	ENG	Adam Sadler

=== U-19 squad ===
The following players made most of their appearances for the under-19 team this season, but may have also appeared for the under-17s or the reserves.

Note: Flags indicate national team as defined under FIFA eligibility rules; some limited exceptions apply. Players may hold more than one non-FIFA nationality.

No.	Pos.	Nation	Player
28	FW	ENG	Michael Chopra
—	GK	ENG	Carl Bell
—	GK	ENG	Jonny Brain
—	DF	ENG	Aaron Labonte
—	DF	ENG	Lee Norton
—	DF	ENG	Bradley Orr
—	DF	ENG	Peter Ramage
—	DF	IRL	Joe Kendrick
—	MF	ENG	Karl Colley
—	MF	ENG	Tommy English
—	MF	ENG	Andy Ferrell
—	MF	ENG	Robert Kent
—	MF	ENG	Chris Moore

No.	Pos.	Nation	Player
—	MF	ENG	Craig Robson
—	MF	ENG	Damon Robson
—	MF	NIR	Carl Heiniger
—	MF	IRL	Stephen Brennan
—	FW	ENG	Jonathan Mann
—	FW	ENG	Richard Offiong
—			Kevin Dixon
—			Paul Dunn
—			Ryan Hogg
—			David Molloy
—			Chris Meredith
—			Matthew Patterson
—			Stephen Pringle

=== U-17 squad ===
The following players made most of their appearances for the under-17 team this season, but may have appeared for the under-19s or the reserves.

Note: Flags indicate national team as defined under FIFA eligibility rules; some limited exceptions apply. Players may hold more than one non-FIFA nationality.

No.	Pos.	Nation	Player
—	GK	ENG	Adam Bartlett
—	GK	ENG	Adam Collin
—	GK	ENG	Ben Smith
—	DF	ENG	Liam Atkin
—	DF	ENG	Chris Carr
—	DF	ENG	Phil Cave
—	DF	ENG	Kris Gate
—	DF	ENG	Steven Taylor
—	DF	SCO	Chris Shanks
—	MF	ENG	James Beaumont
—	MF	ENG	Martin Brittain
—	MF	ENG	Ross Gardner
—	MF	ENG	Steven Istead
—	MF	ENG	Neale McDermott
—	MF	ENG	Ben Webster
—	MF	IRL	Alan O'Brien

No.	Pos.	Nation	Player
—	FW	ENG	Guy Bates
—	FW	ENG	Lewis Guy
—	FW	ENG	Marc Walton
—	FW	COD	Calvin Zola
—	MF		Ben Jackson
—			Michael Carr
—			Ben Dixon
—			Stephen Graham
—			Mark Grant
—			Danny Howe
—			Scott Kerr
—			Mark Laird
—			Graeme Matthewson
—			Wesley Richardson
—			Gavin Stoker
—			Jack Wanless

=== Trialists ===
Note: Flags indicate national team as defined under FIFA eligibility rules; some limited exceptions apply. Players may hold more than one non-FIFA nationality.

No. / Pos. / Nation / Player; — / MF / NED / Dries Boussatta (free agent)	No. / Pos. / Nation / Player; — / MF / IRN / Hamed Kavianpour (on trial from Persepolis)

=== Other players ===
Note: Flags indicate national team as defined under FIFA eligibility rules; some limited exceptions apply. Players may hold more than one non-FIFA nationality.

No.	Pos.	Nation	Player
—	MF	NIR	Daryl Smylie
—	MF	RSA	Matty Pattison

No.	Pos.	Nation	Player
—	FW	ENG	Carl Finnigan

== Coaching staff ==
Position	Staff
Director of Football	(England) Gordon Milne
Manager	(England) Bobby Robson
Assistant manager	(England) David Geddis
First-team coach	(England) John Carver
Goalkeeping coach	(England) Simon Smith
Under 17 coach	(Scotland) Alan Irvine
Under 19 coach	(England) Kenny Wharton
Reserve team coach	(Scotland) Tommy Craig
Academy striker coach	(England) Peter Beardsley
Physiotherapist	(England) Derek Wright
Assistant Physio	(Northern Ireland) Paul Ferris
Chief scout	(England) Charlie Woods

Last updated: 10 January 2020

== Statistics ==
(Starting appearances + substitute appearances)

No.	Pos.	Name	League		FA Cup		League Cup		Europe		Total		Discipline	
No.	Pos.	Name	Apps	Goals	Apps	Goals	Apps	Goals	Apps	Goals	Apps	Goals	Yellow card	Red card
1	GK	(Republic of Ireland) Shay Given	38	0	5	0	1	0	6	0	50	0	2	0
2	DF	(England) Warren Barton	4+1	0	0	0	1	0	6	0	11+1	0	2	0
3	DF	(England) Robbie Elliott	26+1	1	3+1	0	2+1	0	6	0	37+3	1	5	0
4	MF	(Peru) Nolberto Solano	37	7	5	1	4	0	6	4	52	12	4	0
5	DF	(Republic of Ireland) Andy O'Brien	31+3	2	4+1	1	3+1	0	0+1	0	38+6	3	4	0
6	MF	(Chile) Clarence Acuña	10+6	3	3+2	1	1+1	0	0+1	0	14+10	4	4	0
7	MF	(England) Rob Lee	15+1	1	0	0	3	0	3	0	21+1	1	4	0
7	MF	(England) Jermaine Jenas	6+6	0	0	0	0	0	0	0	6+6	0	0	0
8	MF	(England) Kieron Dyer	15+3	3	2	0	0+1	0	0	0	17+4	3	0	0
9	FW	(England) Alan Shearer	36+1	23	5	2	4	2	0	0	45+1	27	3	0
10	MF	(Argentina) Christian Bassedas	1+1	0	0	0	1	0	3+1	0	5+2	0	2	0
11	MF	(Wales) Gary Speed	28+1	5	2	0	3	0	6	2	39+1	7	5	0
12	DF	(England) Andy Griffin	3+1	0	0	0	1	0	0	0	4+1	0	0	0
13	GK	(England) Steve Harper	0	0	0	0	3	0	0	0	3	0	0	0
14	DF	(England) Wayne Quinn	0	0	0+1	0	1	0	6	1	7+1	1	0	0
16	FW	(England) Carl Cort	6+2	1	2	0	0	0	0	0	8+2	1	0	0
17	FW	(Wales) Craig Bellamy	26+1	9	3	0	2+1	4	6	1	37+2	14	9	0
18	DF	(Northern Ireland) Aaron Hughes	34	0	5	1	3	0	6	2	48	3	2	0
20	FW	(Democratic Republic of the Congo) Lomana LuaLua	4+16	3	0+3	0	0+3	0	0+6	2	4+28	5	0	0
22	MF	(England) Jamie McClen	3	0	3	1	0	0	0+2	0	6+2	1	0	0
23	FW	(Nigeria) Shola Ameobi	4+11	0	0+1	0	2+1	2	6	3	12+13	5	3	0
24	DF	(France) Sylvain Distin	20+8	0	5	0	2	0	0	0	27+8	0	6	0
25	MF	(Scotland) Brian Kerr	0	0	0+2	0	0	0	0	0	0+2	0	0	0
32	MF	(France) Laurent Robert	34+2	8	3	1	3	1	0	0	40+2	10	7	0
34	DF	(Greece) Nikos Dabizas	33+2	3	3	0	2	0	6	0	44+2	3	8	0
35	DF	(France) Olivier Bernard	4+12	3	2	0	2	0	0+3	0	8+15	3	2	0

== Pre-season ==
=== Intertoto Cup ===
14 July 2001 R3 1st leg	Lokeren	0 – 4	Newcastle United	Lokeren
		Report	Quinn 13'; Ameobi 23', 39'; LuaLua 85'	Stadium: Daknamstadion; Attendance: 6,000; Referee: C. Mendez (Spain)

21 July 2001 R3 2nd leg	Newcastle United	1 – 0	Lokeren	Newcastle upon Tyne
	Bellamy 60'	Report	Mrzlecki (red card) 81'	Stadium: St James' Park; Attendance: 29,021; Referee: Edgar Steinborn (Germany)

25 July 2001 Semi–finals 1st leg	1860 Munich	2 – 3	Newcastle United	Munich
	Agostino 57'; Tapalović 67'	Report	Solano 13', 55' (pen.); Hughes 83'	Stadium: Olympiastadion; Attendance: 15,000; Referee: Stéphane Bré (France)

1 August 2001 Semi–finals 2nd leg	Newcastle United	3 – 1	1860 Munich	Newcastle upon Tyne
	Speed 5'; LuaLua 80'; Solano 90' (pen.)	Report	Schroth 42'	Stadium: St James' Park; Attendance: 36,635; Referee: Yuri Baskakov (Russia)

7 August 2001 Finals 1st leg	Troyes	0 – 0	Newcastle United	Troyes
		Report		Stadium: Stade de l'Aube; Attendance: 10,414; Referee: Tom Henning Øvrebø (Norway)

21 August 2001 Finals 2nd leg	Newcastle United	4 – 4	Troyes	Newcastle upon Tyne
	Solano 2'; Ameobi 65'; Speed 69' (pen.); Hughes 90'	Report	Leroy 25'; Goussé 28'; Boutal 47', 61'	Stadium: St James' Park; Attendance: 36,577; Referee: Fiorenzo Treossi (Italy)

=== Rob Lee Testimonial ===
11 August 2001	Newcastle United	0 – 1	Athletic Bilbao	Newcastle upon Tyne
15:15 BST		(Report)	Guerrero 64'	Stadium: St James' Park; Attendance: 18,189; Referee: David Laws

== Competitions ==
=== Premier League ===
19 August 2001	Chelsea	1–1	Newcastle United	London
15:00 BST	Zenden 8'	Report	Acuña 77'	Stadium: Stamford Bridge; Attendance: 40,124; Referee: Andy D'Urso

26 August 2001	Newcastle United	1–1	Sunderland	Newcastle upon Tyne
	Bellamy 43'		Phillips 34'	Stadium: St James' Park; Attendance: 52,021; Referee: Mike Riley

8 September 2001	Middlesbrough	1–4	Newcastle United	Middlesbrough
15:00 BST	Cooper 4'; Schwarzer (red card) 31'	Report	Shearer 34' (pen.), 76'; Dabizas 59'; Robert 62'	Stadium: Riverside Stadium; Attendance: 30,004; Referee: Graham Poll

15 September 2001	Newcastle United	4–3	Manchester United	Newcastle upon Tyne
15:00 BST	Robert 5'; Lee 34'; Dabizas 52'; Brown 82' (o.g.)	Report	van Nistelrooy 29'; Giggs 62'; Verón 64'; Keane (yellow card) 90' (red card)	Stadium: St James' Park; Attendance: 52,056; Referee: Steve Bennett

23 September 2001	West Ham United	3–0	Newcastle United	London
	Hutchison 18'; Di Canio 53'; Kanouté 82'	Report		Stadium: Boleyn Ground; Attendance: 24,810; Referee: Peter Jones

26 September 2001	Newcastle United	1–0	Leicester City	Newcastle upon Tyne
	Solano 33'	Report		Stadium: St James' Park; Attendance: 49,185; Referee: David Pugh

30 September 2001	Newcastle United	0–2	Liverpool	Newcastle upon Tyne
		Report	Riise 3'; Murphy 86'	Stadium: St James' Park; Attendance: 52,095; Referee: Graham Barber

13 October 2001	Bolton Wanderers	0–4	Newcastle United	Bolton
	Jääskeläinen (red card) 61'	Report	Solano 41'; Robert 62'; Shearer 72'; Bellamy 84'	Stadium: Reebok Stadium; Attendance: 25,631; Referee: Mike Riley

21 October 2001	Newcastle United	0–2	Tottenham Hotspur	Newcastle upon Tyne
		Report	Anderton 8'; Poyet 20'	Stadium: St James' Park; Attendance: 50,593; Referee: Alan Wiley

27 October 2001	Everton	1–3	Newcastle United	Liverpool
	Weir 51'	Report	Bellamy 19'; Solano 49'; Acuña 86'	Stadium: Goodison Park; Attendance: 37,524; Referee: Jeff Winter

3 November 2001	Newcastle United	3–0	Aston Villa	Newcastle upon Tyne
	Bellamy 37', 82'; Shearer 50'	Report		Stadium: St James' Park; Attendance: 51,057; Referee: Clive Wilkes

17 November 2001	Fulham	3–1	Newcastle United	London
	Saha 20'; Legwinski 28'; Hayles 70'	Report	Speed 65'	Stadium: Craven Cottage; Attendance: 21,159; Referee: Eddie Wolstenholme

24 November 2001	Newcastle United	1–0	Derby County	Newcastle upon Tyne
	Shearer 30' (pen.)	Report		Stadium: St James' Park; Attendance: 50,070; Referee: Rob Styles

1 December 2001	Charlton Athletic	1–1	Newcastle United	London
	MacDonald 83'	Report	Speed 73'; Shearer (red card) 87'	Stadium: The Valley; Attendance: 24,151; Referee: Andy D'Urso

9 December 2001	Ipswich Town	0–1	Newcastle United	Ipswich
		Report	Solano 20'	Stadium: Portman Road; Attendance: 24,748; Referee: Rob Styles

15 December 2001	Newcastle United	2–1	Blackburn Rovers	Newcastle upon Tyne
	Bernard 65'; Speed 70'	Report	Dunn 34'	Stadium: St James' Park; Attendance: 50,064; Referee: Steve Dunn

18 December 2001	Arsenal	1–3	Newcastle United	London
	Pires 20'; Parlour (yellow card) 44' (red card)	Report	O'Brien 60'; Bellamy (yellow card) 72' (red card); Shearer 86' (pen.); Robert 90'	Stadium: Highbury; Attendance: 38,012; Referee: Graham Poll

22 December 2001	Leeds United	3–4	Newcastle United	Leeds
	Bowyer 39'; Viduka 50'; Harte 56'	Report	Bellamy 38'; Elliott 59'; Shearer 71' (pen.); Solano 90'	Stadium: Elland Road; Attendance: 40,287; Referee: Jeff Winter

26 December 2001	Newcastle United	3–0	Middlesbrough	Newcastle upon Tyne
	Shearer 29'; Speed 58'; Bernard 83'	Report		Stadium: St James' Park; Attendance: 52,127; Referee: Mark Halsey

29 December 2001	Newcastle United	1–2	Chelsea	Newcastle upon Tyne
	Shearer 37'	Report	Guðjohnsen 35', 45'	Stadium: St James' Park; Attendance: 52,123; Referee: Steve Bennett

2 January 2002	Manchester United	3–1	Newcastle United	Manchester
	van Nistelrooy 24'; Scholes 50', 62'	Report	Shearer 69'	Stadium: Old Trafford; Attendance: 67,646; Referee: Peter Jones

12 January 2002	Newcastle United	3–1	Leeds United	Newcastle upon Tyne
	Duberry 44' (o.g.); Dyer 60'; Bellamy 87'	Report	Smith 1'; Mills (red card) 70'	Stadium: St James' Park; Attendance: 52,130; Referee: Graham Barber

19 January 2002	Leicester City	0–0	Newcastle United	Leicester
		Report		Stadium: Filbert Street; Attendance: 21,354; Referee: Alan Wiley

30 January 2002	Tottenham Hotspur	1–3	Newcastle United	London
	Iversen 17'	Report	Acuña 67'; Shearer 69'; Bellamy 78'	Stadium: White Hart Lane; Attendance: 35,798; Referee: Mike Dean

2 February 2002	Newcastle United	3–2	Bolton Wanderers	Newcastle upon Tyne
	Shearer 23', 43'; Bellamy 79'	Report	Gardner 19'; Southall 34'	Stadium: St James' Park; Attendance: 52,094; Referee: David Elleray

9 February 2002	Newcastle United	3–1	Southampton	Newcastle upon Tyne
	Robert 24'; Shearer 29', 45' (pen.)	Report	Pahars 39'	Stadium: St James' Park; Attendance: 51,857; Referee: Barry Knight

24 February 2002	Sunderland	0–1	Newcastle United	Sunderland
		Report	Dabizas 64'	Stadium: Stadium of Light; Attendance: 48,290; Referee: Graham Barber

2 March 2002	Newcastle United	0–2	Arsenal	Newcastle upon Tyne
		Report	Bergkamp 11'; Campbell 41'	Stadium: St James' Park; Attendance: 52,067; Referee: Neale Barry

6 March 2002	Liverpool	3–0	Newcastle United	Liverpool
	Murphy 32', 53'; Hamann 75'	Report		Stadium: Anfield; Attendance: 44,204; Referee: Jeff Winter

16 March 2002	Newcastle United	2–2	Ipswich Town	Newcastle upon Tyne
	Robert 60'; Shearer 88'	Report	Bent 43', 50'	Stadium: St James' Park; Attendance: 51,115; Referee: Mike Riley

29 March 2002	Newcastle United	6–2	Everton	Newcastle upon Tyne
	Shearer 13'; Cort 15'; O'Brien 59'; Solano 71', 73'; Bernard 88'	Report	Ferguson 6'; Alexandersson 34'	Stadium: St James' Park; Attendance: 51,921; Referee: Graham Poll

2 April 2002	Aston Villa	1–1	Newcastle United	Birmingham
	Crouch 26'	Report	Shearer 3'	Stadium: Villa Park; Attendance: 36,597; Referee: Steve Dunn

8 April 2002	Newcastle United	1–1	Fulham	Newcastle upon Tyne
	Dyer 21'	Report	Saha 77'	Stadium: St James' Park; Attendance: 50,017; Referee: Alan Wiley

13 April 2002	Derby County	2–3	Newcastle United	Derby
	Christie 46'; Morris 53'	Report	Robert 73'; Dyer 76'; LuaLua 90'	Stadium: Pride Park Stadium; Attendance: 31,031; Referee: Rob Styles

20 April 2002	Newcastle United	3–0	Charlton Athletic	Newcastle upon Tyne
	Speed 22'; LuaLua 46'; Shearer 89'	Report		Stadium: St James' Park; Attendance: 51,360; Referee: Mike Dean

23 April 2002	Blackburn Rovers	2–2	Newcastle United	Blackburn
	Gillespie 28'; Cole 67'	Report	Shearer 63', 71'	Stadium: Ewood Park; Attendance: 26,712; Referee: Uriah Rennie

27 April 2002	Newcastle United	3–1	West Ham United	Newcastle upon Tyne
	Shearer 41'; LuaLua 53'; Robert 66'	Report	Defoe 20'	Stadium: St James' Park; Attendance: 52,127; Referee: Paul Durkin

11 May 2002	Southampton	3–1	Newcastle United	Southampton
	Svensson 17'; Beattie 24' (pen.); El Khalej (red card) 57'; Telfer 90'	Report	Shearer 55'	Stadium: St Mary's Stadium; Attendance: 31,973; Referee: Andy D'Urso

=== FA Cup ===
5 January 2002 Round 3	Newcastle United	2–0	Crystal Palace	Newcastle upon Tyne
	Shearer 40'; Acuña 76'	Report		Stadium: St James' Park; Attendance: 38,089; Referee: Mike Riley

27 January 2002 Round 4	Peterborough United	2–4	Newcastle United	Peterborough
	O'Brien 52' (o.g.); Farrell 69'	Report	O'Brien 14'; McClen 43'; Shearer 84' (pen.); Hughes 85'	Stadium: London Road; Attendance: 13,841; Referee: Neale Barry

17 February 2002 Round 5	Newcastle United	1–0	Manchester City	Newcastle upon Tyne
	Solano 59'	Report	Dunne (red card) 29'	Stadium: St James' Park; Attendance: 51,020; Referee: Alan Wiley

9 March 2002 Round 6	Newcastle United	1–1	Arsenal	Newcastle upon Tyne
	Robert 52'	Report	Edu 14'	Stadium: St James' Park; Attendance: 51,027; Referee: Mark Halsey

23 March 2002 R6 replay	Arsenal	3–0	Newcastle United	London
	Pires 2'; Bergkamp 9'; Campbell 50'	Report		Stadium: Highbury; Attendance: 38,073; Referee: Uriah Rennie

=== League Cup ===
12 September 2001 Round 2	Newcastle United	4–1	Brentford	Newcastle upon Tyne
	Ameobi 59'; Bellamy 108', 117', 120'	Report	Owusu 17'	Stadium: St James' Park; Attendance: 25,633; Referee: R. Furnandiz

9 October 2001 Round 3	Barnsley	0–1	Newcastle United	Barnsley
		Report	Bellamy 79'	Stadium: Oakwell; Attendance: 14,493; Referee: Chris Foy

27 November 2001 Round 4	Newcastle United	4–1	Ipswich Town	Newcastle upon Tyne
	Robert 18'; Ameobi 26'; Shearer 37', 40'	Report	Bent 77'	Stadium: St James' Park; Attendance: 32,576; Referee: Alan Wiley

12 December 2001 Quarter-final	Chelsea	1–0	Newcastle United	London
	Hasselbaink 90'	Report		Stadium: Stamford Bridge; Attendance: 27,613; Referee: David Elleray
