= 2004–05 Newcastle United F.C. season =

Newcastle United
2004–05 season
- Chairman: Freddy Shepherd
- Manager: Bobby Robson (until 30 August); John Carver (caretaker) (from 30 August till 13 September); Graeme Souness (from 13 September)
- Stadium: St James' Park
- Premier League: 14th
- FA Cup: Semi-finals
- League Cup: Fourth round
- UEFA Cup: Quarter-finals
- Top goalscorer: League: Craig Bellamy; Alan Shearer (7 each); All: Alan Shearer (19)
- Average home league attendance: 51,844
Home colours	Away colours	Third colours

The 2004–05 season was Newcastle United's 108th season in English football, and their 22nd in the Premier League. The season began poorly for Newcastle, with no wins in their first four matches, and manager Bobby Robson was sacked, bringing to an end his five-year tenure at the club. His assistant, John Carver took over as caretaker manager, managing one win, but was not considered for the permanent post, and left in September 2004. Blackburn Rovers manager Graeme Souness was brought in, but despite a positive start, he was unable to mount a challenge anywhere near the Champions League challenge the team had managed the previous season.

Towards the end of the season, teammates Lee Bowyer and Kieron Dyer were sent off for fighting with each other during a game. Their suspensions, coupled with several injuries, left Newcastle light on players. The club finished in 14th place in the league for the 2004–05 season.

== Season summary ==
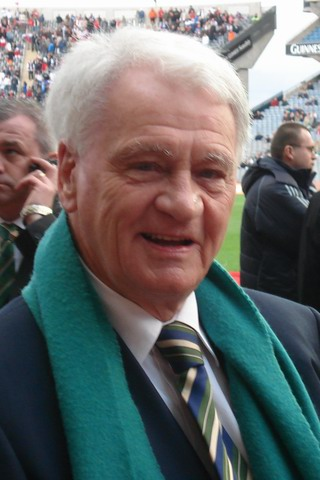
Bobby Robson was sacked on 30 August

After nearly five years in charge, Bobby Robson was dismissed on 30 August, following a largely indifferent start to the season and alleged discontent in the dressing room. The team lost two and drew two of their first four games, three in which they actually surrendered from leading positions: they drew 2–2 at Middlesbrough in the Tyne–Tees derby after taking the lead twice; they surrendered a 2–0 lead against recently promoted Norwich City to draw 2–2 and they surrendered a 2–1 lead at Villa Park to lose 4–2 to Aston Villa. A split had grown between Robson and the club owners when they had made a number of high-profile signings, apparently without consulting him - in particular, that of Patrick Kluivert. He was further undermined by the club's high profile, but ultimately futile, offer for Everton's Wayne Rooney, who instead moved to Manchester United. Following Rooney's transfer, Robson stated his dismay at the tendency for overpaid young players to demand all the perks without proving themselves on the pitch. Events during the ensuing season on and off the pitch would go a long way to confirm Robson's assessment, who was later given a £1 million severance payment by Newcastle.

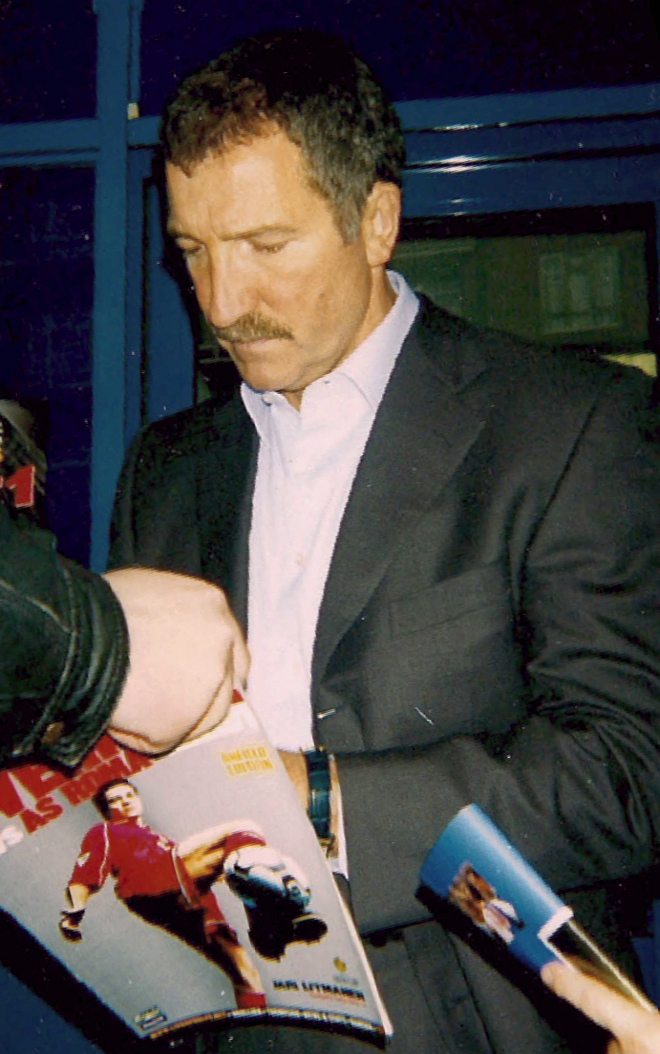
Graeme Souness

Graeme Souness, who had guided Blackburn Rovers to the 2002 League Cup trophy and sixth place in the Premiership in recent years, was appointed as Robson's replacement. A ten-match unbeaten run following his appointment suggested that Souness could take Newcastle back to Champions League qualification, but following that the club's form dipped.

Craig Bellamy, a key player in Newcastle's strike force, was loaned to Celtic in January for the remainder of the season, after Souness discovered Bellamy had told teammates he was going to fake an injury. Captain Alan Shearer backed Souness's demand that Bellamy apologise for his behaviour to the whole squad, but he refused to listen. Their dip in performance due to the absence of Shearer through injury worried the fan base, leading to fans debating on whether Bellamy should have departed the club.

In November 2004, club chairman Freddy Shepherd again caused controversy, stating there was no debt owed by the "elite" clubs of the Premiership to the rest of the FA – but with his own team underperforming, this was somewhat ironic as well as inappropriate.

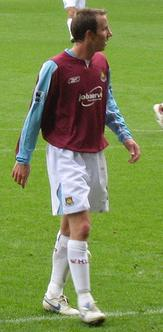
Lee Bowyer: on-field fight with teammate Kieron Dyer

An unbeaten run in all competitions in February and March was ended in April with a home defeat against Aston Villa; during the match, Lee Bowyer and Kieron Dyer were sent off for an on-pitch fight. As a result of the incident, later described as "the blackest day" by Shepherd, Bowyer was fined six weeks' wages (about £200,000) and both players received playing bans from the FA. The event overshadowed the announcement that Alan Shearer (expected to retire that season) had extended his playing contract for a further year and was to take up a coaching role with the club.

A rift opened up between Souness and Shepherd, with Souness complaining that the squad, lacking strength in depth after poor judgment in the transfer market (with the promised major signings not materialising) was not up to the challenge. Souness also criticised the state of the club's training ground, stating it was the main reason why so many injuries had taken their toll on the players.

=== Cup competitions ===
Newcastle had qualified for the UEFA Cup with a fifth-placed finish the previous season, and managed to reach the quarter-finals. Newcastle defeated Portuguese side Sporting Lisbon in the home leg, but were most comprehensively outplayed in the away match and lost 4–1, in the process suffering several injuries. In the same week they played Manchester United in an FA Cup semi-final at the Millennium Stadium. The scoreline, again 4–1, reflected the one-sided nature of the encounter. This left the Intertoto Cup as the team's only route into European competition in the 2005–06 season.

== Final league table ==
Pos	Team	Pld	W	D	L	GF	GA	GD	Pts	Qualification or relegation
12	Birmingham City	38	11	12	15	40	46	−6	45	
13	Fulham	38	12	8	18	52	60	−8	44	
14	Newcastle United	38	10	14	14	47	57	−10	44	Qualification for the Intertoto Cup third round
15	Blackburn Rovers	38	9	15	14	32	43	−11	42	
16	Portsmouth	38	10	9	19	43	59	−16	39	

Rules for classification: 1) points; 2) goal difference; 3) number of goals scored.

== Team kit ==
The team kit for the 2004–05 season was produced by Adidas. The main shirt sponsor was Northern Rock.

== Club transfers ==
=== In ===
Date	Pos	Name	From	Fee
2 July 2004	MF	(England) James Milner	(England) Leeds United	£5,000,000
22 July 2004	FW	(Netherlands) (Suriname) Patrick Kluivert	(Spain) Barcelona	Free
29 July 2004	MF	(England) Nicky Butt	(England) Manchester United	£2,500,000
3 August 2004	MF	(France) (Democratic Republic of the Congo) Charles N'Zogbia	(France) Le Havre	£250,000
10 August 2004	DF	(Republic of Ireland) Stephen Carr	(England) Tottenham Hotspur	£2,000,000
16 September 2004	DF	(Norway) Ronny Johnsen	(England) Aston Villa	Free
1 January 2005	DF	(Nigeria) Celestine Babayaro	(England) Chelsea	Undisclosed
2 January 2005	DF	(France) (Cameroon) Jean-Alain Boumsong	(Scotland) Rangers	£8,000,000
25 January 2005	DF	(Senegal) (France) Amdy Faye	(England) Portsmouth	£2,000,000

- Total spending: ▼£19,250,000

=== Out ===
Date	Pos.	Name	To	Fee
26 May 2004	DF	(England) Andy Griffin	(England) Portsmouth	Free
27 May 2004	FW	(Democratic Republic of the Congo) Calvin Zola	(England) Tranmere Rovers	Free
28 June 2004	DF	(Scotland) Steven Caldwell	(England) Sunderland	Free
29 June 2004	MF	(Scotland) Brian Kerr	(Scotland) Motherwell	Free
5 July 2004	MF	(England) Bradley Orr	(England) Bristol City	Free
12 July 2004	FW	(Democratic Republic of the Congo) Lomana LuaLua	(England) Portsmouth	£1,750,000
21 July 2004	MF	(Portugal) Hugo Viana	(Portugal) Sporting CP	Season-long loan
21 July 2004	MF	(Wales) Gary Speed	(England) Bolton Wanderers	£750,000
20 August 2004	DF	(England) Jonathan Woodgate	(Spain) Real Madrid	£13,400,000
24 September 2004	FW	(England) Michael Bridges	(England) Sunderland	End of loan
31 January 2005	DF	(France) Olivier Bernard	(England) Southampton	£400,000
31 January 2005	FW	(Wales) Craig Bellamy	(Scotland) Celtic	Season-long loan

- Total income: ▲£16,300,000

=== Coaching staff ===
Position	Staff
Manager	(Scotland) Graeme Souness
Assistant Manager	(England) Terry McDermott
Assistant Manager	(England) Alan Murray
First Team coach	(England) Phil Boersma
First Team coach	(Wales) Dean Saunders
Goalkeeping Coach	(England) Simon Smith
Development Coach	(England) Arthur Cox
Reserve Team Coach	(France) David Ginola
Chief scout	(Scotland) Steve Clarke

Last updated: 3 May 2011

== Players ==
=== First-team squad ===
Squad at end of season

Note: Flags indicate national team as defined under FIFA eligibility rules; some limited exceptions apply. Players may hold more than one non-FIFA nationality.

No.	Pos.	Nation	Player
1	GK	IRL	Shay Given (vice-captain)
2	DF	IRL	Stephen Carr
3	DF	ENG	Robbie Elliott
4	MF	ENG	Nicky Butt
5	DF	IRL	Andy O'Brien
6	DF	FRA	Jean-Alain Boumsong
7	MF	ENG	Jermaine Jenas
8	MF	ENG	Kieron Dyer
9	FW	ENG	Alan Shearer (captain)
10	FW	WAL	Craig Bellamy
11	FW	NED	Patrick Kluivert
12	GK	ENG	Steve Harper
14	MF	FRA	Charles N'Zogbia
15	MF	SEN	Amdy Faye

No.	Pos.	Nation	Player
16	MF	ENG	James Milner
17	MF	ENG	Darren Ambrose
18	DF	NIR	Aaron Hughes
19	DF	ENG	Titus Bramble
22	MF	ENG	Jamie McClen
23	FW	ENG	Shola Ameobi
24	GK	ENG	Tony Caig
27	DF	ENG	Steven Taylor
28	FW	ENG	Michael Chopra
29	MF	ENG	Lee Bowyer
32	MF	FRA	Laurent Robert
33	DF	NGR	Celestine Babayaro
39	MF	ENG	Martin Brittain
42	DF	ENG	Peter Ramage

=== Left club during season ===
Note: Flags indicate national team as defined under FIFA eligibility rules; some limited exceptions apply. Players may hold more than one non-FIFA nationality.

No.	Pos.	Nation	Player
6	DF	ENG	Jonathan Woodgate (to Real Madrid)
25	DF	NOR	Ronny Johnsen (to Vålerenga)
35	DF	FRA	Olivier Bernard (to Southampton)

No.	Pos.	Nation	Player
40	FW	ENG	Lewis Guy (to Doncaster Rovers)
45	MF	POR	Hugo Viana (on loan to Sporting CP)

=== Reserve squad ===
The following players did not appear for the first-team this season, and made most of their appearances for the reserve team, but may have also appeared for the under-18s.

Note: Flags indicate national team as defined under FIFA eligibility rules; some limited exceptions apply. Players may hold more than one non-FIFA nationality.

No.	Pos.	Nation	Player
38	MF	RSA	Matty Pattison
41	DF	ENG	Kris Gate
—	GK	ENG	Adam Bartlett
—	DF	ENG	Phil Cave
—	DF	ENG	Paul Huntington
—	MF	ENG	Ben Webster

No.	Pos.	Nation	Player
—	MF	NIR	Daryl Smylie
—	MF	IRL	Stephen Brennan
—	MF	IRL	Alan O'Brien
—	FW	ENG	Guy Bates
—			Danny Howe

=== Under-18 squad ===
The following players made most of their appearances for the under-18 team, but may have also appeared for the reserves.

Note: Flags indicate national team as defined under FIFA eligibility rules; some limited exceptions apply. Players may hold more than one non-FIFA nationality.

No.	Pos.	Nation	Player
43	GK	ENG	Ben Smith
—	GK	ENG	Fraser Forster
—	DF	ENG	Liam Atkin
—	DF	ENG	Craig Baxter
—	DF	ENG	Chris Farman
—	DF	ENG	Paul Huntington
—	DF	ENG	Chris Shanks
—	DF	CAN	David Edgar
—	MF	ENG	Rob Cavener
—	MF	ENG	Dean Critchlow
—	MF	ENG	Nicky Deverdics
—	MF	ENG	Mark Doninger
—	MF	ENG	Callum Little

No.	Pos.	Nation	Player
—	MF	ENG	Glenn Reay
—	FW	ENG	Tomi Ameobi
—	FW	ENG	Andy Carroll
—	FW	ENG	Brian Dodsworth
—	FW	ENG	Carl Finnigan
—	FW	ENG	Scott Marshall
—	FW	ENG	Marc Walton
—	DF		Ross Cowan
—			Chris Lisle
—			Lewis Marr
—			Paul O'Brien
—			Michael Terrell

=== Trialists ===
Note: Flags indicate national team as defined under FIFA eligibility rules; some limited exceptions apply. Players may hold more than one non-FIFA nationality.

No. / Pos. / Nation / Player; — / FW / POR / Cícero (on trial from Braga)	No. / Pos. / Nation / Player; — / DF / SUI / Christian Schwegler (on trial from FC Luzern)

== Appearances, goals and cards ==
(Starting appearances + substitute appearances)

No.	Pos.	Name	League		FA Cup		League Cup		UEFA Cup		Total		Discipline	
No.	Pos.	Name	Apps	Goals	Apps	Goals	Apps	Goals	Apps	Goals	Apps	Goals	Yellow card	Red card
1	GK	(Republic of Ireland) Shay Given	36	0	3	0	1	0	12	0	52	0	1	0
2	DF	(Republic of Ireland) Stephen Carr	26	1	4	0	0	0	9	0	39	1	7	0
3	DF	(England) Robbie Elliott	15+2	1	0	0	0	0	5	0	20+2	1	5	0
4	MF	(England) Nicky Butt	16+2	1	2	0	1	0	4+1	1	23+3	1	4	1
5	DF	(Republic of Ireland) Andy O'Brien	21+2	2	1+2	0	1	0	9+2	0	32+6	2	5	0
6	DF	(France) (Cameroon) Jean-Alain Boumsong	14	0	4	0	0	0	0	0	18	0	1	0
7	MF	(England) Jermaine Jenas	28+3	1	3+1	0	2	1	9+2	0	42+6	2	5	0
8	MF	(England) Kieron Dyer	20+3	4	3	0	0+1	0	6+1	2	29+5	6	0	1
9	FW	(England) Alan Shearer	26+2	7	1	1	1	0	9	11	40+2	19	1	0
10	FW	(Wales) Craig Bellamy	21	7	4	1	1+1	0	5	3	28+1	10	2	0
11	FW	(Netherlands) (Suriname) Patrick Kluivert	15+10	6	3+1	2	2	0	5+1	5	25+12	13	3	0
12	GK	(England) Steve Harper	2	0	2	0	1	0	0+2	0	5+2	0	0	0
14	DF	(France) (Democratic Republic of the Congo) Charles N'Zogbia	8+6	0	1+1	0	0	0	1+2	0	10+9	0	2	0
15	MF	(Senegal) (France) Amdy Faye	8+1	1	3	0	0	0	5	0	16+1	0	3	0
16	MF	(England) James Milner	13+12	1	1+3	0	1	0	3+8	0	16+23	1	1	0
17	MF	(England) Darren Ambrose	8+4	3	0+1	0	1	0	2+2	0	11+7	3	3	0
18	DF	(Northern Ireland) Aaron Hughes	18+4	1	1+1	0	1+1	0	9+1	0	29+7	1	1	0
19	DF	(England) Titus Bramble	18+1	1	4	0	2	0	6+1	0	30+2	1	4	0
23	FW	(Nigeria) Shola Ameobi	17+14	2	3+2	3	1+1	1	6+1	1	27+18	7	6	1
25	DF	(Norway) Ronny Johnsen	3	0	0	0	2	0	0	0	5	0	2	0
27	DF	(England) Steven Taylor	11+2	0	2	0	0	0	4+3	0	17+5	0	6	1
28	FW	(England) Michael Chopra	0+1	0	0	0	0	0	0	0	0+1	0	0	0
29	MF	(England) Lee Bowyer	26+1	3	2	1	0+1	0	8+1	3	36+3	7	11	3
32	MF	(France) Laurent Robert	20+11	3	4	0	2	0	8+2	2	34+13	5	5	0
33	DF	(Nigeria) Celestine Babayaro	7	0	4	1	0	0	2	0	13	1	0	0
35	DF	(France) Olivier Bernard	19+2	2	0	0	2	0	5+1	0	26+3	0	6	0
40	FW	(England) Lewis Guy	0	0	0	0	0	0	0+1	0	0+1	0	0	0
42	DF	(England) Peter Ramage	2+2	0	0	0	0	0	0+1	0	2+3	0	0	0

== Matches ==
=== Pre-season ===
14 July 2004 Friendly	Thailand	1–1 (4–2 p)	Newcastle United	Bangkok
18:00 ICT; 10:00 BST	Chaikamdee 20'	Report	Bowyer 62'	Stadium: Rajamangala Stadium; Attendance: 40,000
	Penalties
	Viwatchaichok (penalty scored); Thonglao (penalty scored); Singthong (penalty missed); Surinsirirat (penalty scored); Chaikamdee (penalty scored)		(penalty scored) Ameobi; (penalty missed) Bowyer; (penalty missed) Milner; (penalty scored) Brittain

18 July 2004 Friendly	Kitchee	1–1 (6–7 p)	Newcastle United	Hong Kong
20:00 HKT; 13:00 BST	Desailly 14'	Report	Milner 63'	Stadium: Hong Kong Stadium; Attendance: 13,131; Referee: Fong Yau Fat (Hong Kong)
	Penalties
	???? (penalty scored) ???? (penalty scored) ???? (penalty scored) ???? (penalty scored) ???? (penalty scored) ???? (penalty scored); Cheung (penalty missed)		(penalty scored) Ameobi; (penalty scored) Brittain; (penalty scored) Speed; (penalty scored) Milner; (penalty scored) Taylor; (penalty scored) Bramble; (penalty scored) Hughes

28 July 2004 Dale Roberts Memorial	Ipswich Town	2–1	Newcastle United	Ipswich
19:45 BST	Kuqi 6'; Couñago 71'	Report	Robert 39'	Stadium: Portman Road; Attendance: 24,644; Referee: Mike Thorpe

31 July 2004 Gateshead Cup	Newcastle United	4–2	Rangers	Newcastle upon Tyne
15:00 BST	Shearer 11' (pen.); Bellamy 28'; Bernard 36'; Dyer 90'	Report	Pršo 42'; Ricksen 84'	Stadium: St James' Park; Attendance: 31,554; Referee: Mark Halsey

1 August 2004 Gateshead Cup	Newcastle United	0–1	Sporting CP	Newcastle upon Tyne
15:00 BST		Report	Tello 33'	Stadium: St James' Park; Attendance: 23,446; Referee: Neale Barry

4 August 2004 Friendly	Celtic	2–1	Newcastle United	Celtic Park
19:45 BST	Sylla 71'; Camara 89'	Report	Bellamy 60'	Stadium: Glasgow; Attendance: 20,000; Referee: Willie Young

=== Premier League ===
Results by round

Round	1	2	3	4	5	6	7	8	9	10	11	12	13	14	15	16	17	18	19	20	21	22	23	24	25	26	27	28	29	30	31	32	33	34	35	36	37	38
Ground	A	H	H	A	H	A	H	A	A	H	A	H	H	A	H	A	H	A	A	H	H	A	H	A	A	H	H	H	A	H	A	A	A	H	H	A	A	H
Result	D	L	D	L	W	W	W	D	D	W	L	L	L	W	D	L	D	L	D	L	W	D	W	L	D	D	W	W	D	L	L	L	L	D	D	W	L	D
Position	6	15	15	17	12	10	7	6	8	7	8	9	11	9	10	12	12	13	14	14	13	14	12	12	12	12	11	10	9	10	11	11	11	12	12	12	12	14

Source: World Football: Premier League 2004/05
A = Away; H = Home; W = Win; D = Draw; L = Loss

14 August 2004 1	Middlesbrough	2–2	Newcastle United	Middlesbrough
15:00 BST	Downing 73'; Hasselbaink 90'	Report	Bellamy 14'; Shearer 82' (pen.)	Stadium: Riverside Stadium; Attendance: 34,268; Referee: Steve Bennett

21 August 2004 2	Newcastle United	0–1	Tottenham Hotspur	Newcastle upon Tyne
		Report	Atouba 51'	Stadium: St James' Park; Attendance: 52,185; Referee: Mike Dean

25 August 2004 3	Newcastle United	2–2	Norwich City	Newcastle upon Tyne
	Bellamy 40'; Hughes 50'	Report	Bentley 52'; Doherty 74'	Stadium: St James' Park; Attendance: 51,574; Referee: Mark Halsey

28 August 2004 4	Aston Villa	4–2	Newcastle United	Birmingham
	Mellberg 4'; Cole 53'; Barry 71'; Ángel 82'	Report	Kluivert 28'; O'Brien 36'	Stadium: Villa Park; Attendance: 36,305; Referee: Mike Riley

11 September 2004 5	Newcastle United	3–0	Blackburn Rovers	Newcastle upon Tyne
	Flitcroft 9' (o.g.); Shearer 16'; O'Brien 83'	Report		Stadium: St James' Park; Attendance: 52,015; Referee: Dermot Gallagher

19 September 2004 6	Southampton	1–2	Newcastle United	Southampton
	Svensson 53'	Report	Prutton 45' (o.g.); Carr 57'	Stadium: St Mary's Stadium; Attendance: 30,709; Referee: Chris Foy

25 September 2004 7	Newcastle United	3–1	West Bromwich Albion	Newcastle upon Tyne
	Kluivert 70'; Milner 78'; Shearer 86'	Report	Purse (yellow card) 63' (red card); Horsfield 87'	Stadium: St James' Park; Attendance: 52,308; Referee: Mike Riley

3 October 2004 8	Birmingham City	2–2	Newcastle United	Birmingham
	Yorke 23'; Upson 57'	Report	Jenas 3'; Butt 67'	Stadium: St Andrew's; Attendance: 29,021; Referee: Howard Webb

17 October 2004 9	Charlton Athletic	1–1	Newcastle United	London
	O'Brien 51' (o.g.)	Report	Bellamy 39'	Stadium: The Valley; Attendance: 26,553; Referee: Peter Walton

24 October 2004 10	Newcastle United	4–3	Manchester City	Newcastle upon Tyne
	Robert 49'; Shearer 58' (pen.); Elliott 69'; Bellamy 89'	Report	Wright-Phillips 64', 77'; Fowler 67' (pen.)	Stadium: St James' Park; Attendance: 52,316; Referee: Steve Dunn

31 October 2004 11	Bolton Wanderers	2–1	Newcastle United	Bolton
	Diouf 52'; Davies 70'	Report	Ambrose 55'	Stadium: Reebok Stadium; Attendance: 27,196; Referee: Graham Poll

7 November 2004 12	Newcastle United	1–4	Fulham	Newcastle upon Tyne
	Bellamy 77'	Report	John 28'; Malbranque 65', 71' (pen.); Boa Morte 76'	Stadium: St James' Park; Attendance: 51,118; Referee: Howard Webb

14 November 2004 13	Newcastle United	1–3	Manchester United	Newcastle upon Tyne
15:00 BST	Shearer 71'	Report	Rooney 7', 90' van Nistelrooy 74' (pen.)	Stadium: St James' Park; Attendance: 52,320; Referee: Mike Dean

20 November 2004 14	Crystal Palace	0–2	Newcastle United	London
		Report	Kluivert 79'; Bellamy 88'	Stadium: Selhurst Park; Attendance: 22,937; Referee: Mark Halsey

28 November 2004 15	Newcastle United	1–1	Everton	Newcastle upon Tyne
	Bellamy 5'	Report	Carsley 56'	Stadium: St James' Park; Attendance: 51,247; Referee: Neale Barry

4 December 2004 16	Chelsea	4–0	Newcastle United	London
	Lampard 63'; Drogba 69'; Robben 89'; Kežman 90' (pen.)	Report		Stadium: Stamford Bridge; Attendance: 42,328; Referee: Rob Styles

11 December 2004 17	Newcastle United	1–1	Portsmouth	Newcastle upon Tyne
	Bowyer 3'	Report	Stone 30'	Stadium: St James' Park; Attendance: 51,480; Referee: Mike Riley

19 December 2004 18	Liverpool	3–1	Newcastle United	Liverpool
	Bramble 35' (o.g.); Mellor 38'; Baroš 61'	Report	Kluivert 32'; Bowyer (yellow card) 77' (red card)	Stadium: Anfield; Attendance: 43,856; Referee: Jeff Winter

26 December 2004 19	Blackburn Rovers	2–2	Newcastle United	Blackburn
	Dickov 26'; Todd 54'	Report	Dyer 6'; Robert 34'	Stadium: Ewood Park; Attendance: 29,271; Referee: Matt Messias

29 December 2004 20	Newcastle United	0–1	Arsenal	Newcastle upon Tyne
		Report	Vieira 45'	Stadium: St James' Park; Attendance: 52,320; Referee: Steve Bennett

1 January 2005 21	Newcastle United	2–1	Birmingham City	Newcastle upon Tyne
	Ameobi 6'; Bowyer 44'	Report	Heskey 64'	Stadium: St James' Park; Attendance: 52,222; Referee: Rob Styles

3 January 2005 22	West Bromwich Albion	0–0	Newcastle United	West Bromwich
		Report		Stadium: The Hawthorns; Attendance: 25,259; Referee: Neale Barry

15 January 2005 23	Newcastle United	2–1	Southampton	Newcastle upon Tyne
	Shearer 9' (pen.); Bramble 38'	Report	Crouch 42'	Stadium: St James' Park; Attendance: 51,266; Referee: Uriah Rennie

23 January 2005 24	Arsenal	1–0	Newcastle United	London
	Bergkamp 19'	Report		Stadium: Highbury; Attendance: 38,137; Referee: Steve Dunn

2 February 2005 25	Manchester City	1–1	Newcastle United	Manchester
	Fowler 49' (pen.)	Report	Shearer 9'	Stadium: City of Manchester Stadium; Attendance: 45,752; Referee: Andy D'Urso

5 February 2005 26	Newcastle United	1–1	Charlton Athletic	Newcastle upon Tyne
	Dyer 52'	Report	Rommedahl 53'	Stadium: St James' Park; Attendance: 51,114; Referee: Mark Halsey

27 February 2005 27	Newcastle United	2–1	Bolton Wanderers	Newcastle upon Tyne
	Bowyer 35'; Dyer 69'	Report	Giannakopoulos 41'	Stadium: St James' Park; Attendance: 50,430; Referee: Steve Dunn

5 March 2005 28	Newcastle United	1–0	Liverpool	Newcastle upon Tyne
	Robert 70'	Report		Stadium: St James' Park; Attendance: 52,323; Referee: Howard Webb

19 March 2005 29	Portsmouth	1–1	Newcastle United	Portsmouth
	Stone 45'	Report	Dyer 43'	Stadium: Fratton Park; Attendance: 20,165; Referee: Matt Messias

2 April 2005 30	Newcastle United	0–3	Aston Villa	Newcastle upon Tyne
	Taylor (red card) 73'; Bowyer (red card) 82'; Dyer (red card) 82'	Report	Ángel 5'; Barry 73' (pen.), 80' (pen.)	Stadium: St James' Park; Attendance: 52,306; Referee: Barry Knight

10 April 2005 31	Tottenham Hotspur	1–0	Newcastle United	London
	Defoe 42'	Report		Stadium: White Hart Lane; Attendance: 35,885; Referee: Steve Bennett

20 April 2005 32	Norwich City	2–1	Newcastle United	Norwich
	Safri 68'; Ashton 90'	Report	Kluivert 89'	Stadium: Carrow Road; Attendance: 25,503; Referee: Andre Marriner

24 April 2005 33	Manchester United	2–1	Newcastle United	Manchester
	Rooney 57'; Brown 75'	Report	Ambrose 27'	Stadium: Old Trafford; Attendance: 67,845; Referee: Neale Barry

27 April 2005 34	Newcastle United	0–0	Middlesbrough	Newcastle upon Tyne
		Report		Stadium: St James' Park; Attendance: 52,047; Referee: Mark Halsey

30 April 2005 35	Newcastle United	0–0	Crystal Palace	Newcastle upon Tyne
		Report		Stadium: St James' Park; Attendance: 52,123; Referee: Alan Wiley

4 May 2005 36	Fulham	1–3	Newcastle United	London
	Radzinski 86'	Report	Ambrose 18'; Kluivert 62'; Ameobi 75'	Stadium: Craven Cottage; Attendance: 19,003; Referee: Graham Poll

7 May 2005 37	Everton	2–0	Newcastle United	Liverpool
	Weir 43'; Cahill 59'	Report	Ameobi (red card) 56'	Stadium: Goodison Park; Attendance: 40,438; Referee: Barry Knight

15 May 2005 38	Newcastle United	1–1	Chelsea	Newcastle upon Tyne
	Geremi 33' (o.g.)	Report	Lampard 35' (pen.)	Stadium: St James' Park; Attendance: 52,326; Referee: Howard Webb

=== UEFA Cup ===
16 September 2004 First round, first leg	Newcastle United	2–0	Bnei Sakhnin	Newcastle upon Tyne, England
19:45 BST; 20:45 CET	Kluivert 4', 41'; Butt (red card) 60'	Report	Suan (red card) 57'	Stadium: St James' Park; Attendance: 30,221; Referee: António Almeida Costa (Portugal)

30 September 2004 First round, second leg	Bnei Sakhnin	1–5 (1–7 agg.)	Newcastle United	Ramat Gan, Israel
20:45 IST; 19:45 BST	Masudi 13'; Murambadoro (red card) 88'	Report	Kluivert 9', 42'; Shearer 38', 52' (pen.), 90'	Stadium: Ramat Gan Stadium; Attendance: 12,000; Referee: Julián Rodríguez Santiago (Spain)

21 October 2004 Matchday 1	Panionios	0–1	Newcastle United	Nea Smyrni, Greece
21:30 CET		Report	Shearer 87' (pen.)	Stadium: Nea Smyrni Stadium; Attendance: 8,000; Referee: Roberto Rosetti (Italy)

4 November 2004 Matchday 2	Newcastle United	2–0	Dinamo Tbilisi	Newcastle upon Tyne, England
	Shearer 38'; Bellamy 56'	Report		Stadium: St James' Park; Attendance: 27,218; Referee: Espen Berntsen (Norway)

25 November 2004 Matchday 3	Sochaux	0–4	Newcastle United	Montbéliard, France
		Report	Bowyer 29'; Ameobi 46'; Bellamy 75'; Robert 90'	Stadium: Stade Auguste Bonal; Attendance: 15,173; Referee: Carlos Megía Dávila (Spain)

16 December 2004 Matchday 4	Newcastle United	1–1	Sporting CP	Newcastle upon Tyne, England
	Bellamy 5'	Report	Custódio 40'	Stadium: St James' Park; Attendance: 28,017; Referee: Paul Allaerts (Belgium)

17 February 2005 Round of 32, first leg	Heerenveen	1–2	Newcastle United	Heerenveen, Netherlands
	Huntelaar 24'	Report	Shearer 69'; Bowyer 82' (red card) 86'	Stadium: Abe Lenstra Stadion; Attendance: 19,500; Referee: Zsolt Szabó (Hungary)

24 February 2005 Round of 32, second leg	Newcastle United	2–1 (4–2 agg.)	Heerenveen	Newcastle upon Tyne, England
	Breuer 10' (o.g.); Shearer 25'	Report	Bruggink 80' (pen.)	Stadium: St James' Park; Attendance: 26,156; Referee: Dejan Delević

10 March 2005 Round of 16, first leg	Olympiacos	1–3	Newcastle United	Piraeus, Greece
	Georgatos (red card) 11'; Đorđević 16' (pen.); Kostoulas (yellow card) 44' (red card)	Report	Shearer 12' (pen.); Robert 34'; Kluivert 69'	Stadium: Karaiskakis Stadium; Attendance: 33,000; Referee: Arturo Daudén Ibáñez (Spain)

16 March 2005 Round of 16, second leg	Newcastle United	4–0 (7–1 agg.)	Olympiacos	Newcastle upon Tyne, England
	Dyer 18'; Shearer 45', 69'; Bowyer 54'	Report		Stadium: St James' Park; Attendance: 33,000; Referee: Konrad Plautz (Austria)

7 April 2005 Quarter-finals, first leg	Newcastle United	1–0	Sporting CP	Newcastle upon Tyne, England
	Shearer 37'	Report		Stadium: St James' Park; Attendance: 36,753; Referee: Yuri Baskakov (Russia)

14 April 2005 Quarter-finals, second leg	Sporting CP	4–1 (4–2 agg.)	Newcastle United	Lisbon, Portugal
	Niculae 40'; Sá Pinto 71'; Beto 77'; Rochemback 90'	Report	Dyer 20'	Stadium: Estádio José Alvalade; Attendance: 45,000; Referee: Peter Fröjdfeldt (Sweden)

=== FA Cup ===
9 January 2005 Third round	Yeading	0–2	Newcastle United	London
		Report	Bowyer 51'; Ameobi 61'	Stadium: Loftus Road; Attendance: 10,824; Referee: Howard Webb

29 January 2005 Fourth round	Newcastle United	3–1	Coventry City	Newcastle upon Tyne
	Shearer 37'; Ameobi 42'; Babayaro 52'	Report	Adebola 45'	Stadium: St James' Park; Attendance: 44,044; Referee: Neale Barry

20 February 2005 Fifth round	Newcastle United	1–0	Chelsea	Newcastle upon Tyne
	Kluivert 4'	Report	Cudicini (red card) 90'	Stadium: St James' Park; Attendance: 45,740; Referee: Mark Halsey

13 March 2005 Sixth round	Newcastle United	1–0	Tottenham Hotspur	Newcastle upon Tyne
16:00	Kluivert 4'	Report		Stadium: St James' Park; Attendance: 51,307; Referee: Rob Styles

17 April 2005 Semi-finals	Newcastle United	1–4	Manchester United	Cardiff
13:00	Ameobi 59'	Report	van Nistelrooy 19', 58'; Scholes 45'; Ronaldo 76'	Stadium: Millennium Stadium; Attendance: 69,280; Referee: Mike Riley

=== League Cup ===
27 October 2004 Third round	Newcastle United	2–1	Norwich City	Newcastle upon Tyne
	Jenas 2'; Ameobi 42' (pen.)	Report	Huckerby 56' (pen.)	Stadium: St James' Park; Attendance: 42,153; Referee: Phil Dowd

10 November 2004 Fourth round	Newcastle United	0–2	Chelsea	Newcastle upon Tyne
		Report	Guðjohnsen 100'; Robben 112'	Stadium: St James' Park; Attendance: 38,055; Referee: Steve Bennett
