= 2005–06 Newcastle United F.C. season =

Newcastle United
2005–06 season
- Chairman: Freddy Shepherd
- Manager: Graeme Souness (until 2 February); Glenn Roeder (from 2 February)
- Stadium: St. James' Park
- Premier League: 7th
- FA Cup: Sixth round
- League Cup: Fourth round
- UEFA Intertoto Cup: Semi-finals
- Top goalscorer: League: Alan Shearer (10); All: Alan Shearer (14)
- Highest home attendance: 52,327 (vs. Manchester United)
- Lowest home attendance: 50,451 (vs. Charlton Athletic)
Home colours	Away colours	Third colours

During the 2005–06 season, Newcastle United participated in the Premier League.

== Season summary ==
In July 2005 rumours circulated that Newcastle was being stalked with a new buyer, but this later emerged to be the Shepherds consolidating their interests. On the pitch, Newcastle were eliminated from the Intertoto Cup after a 4–2 aggregate loss to Deportivo La Coruna in the semi-final, eliminating the club from European competition for the season.

Upon Craig Bellamy's return from his loan to Celtic, it was reported that he had not resolved his differences with Souness or Shearer, and was sold to Blackburn Rovers for £5 million. During the summer transfer window, Patrick Kluivert, Jermaine Jenas, Aaron Hughes and Andy O'Brien were sold by Souness. Laurent Robert and James Milner were loaned out, to Portsmouth and Aston Villa respectively (Robert would be transferred to Benfica in January). The club signed Emre, Scott Parker, Craig Moore and Albert Luque.

In August, the club signed Michael Owen from Real Madrid, despite strong interest from Owen's former club Liverpool. The fee, £17 million, surpassed Newcastle's previous record of £15 million for Alan Shearer from Blackburn in 1996. In the closing hours of the transfer window, the club re-signed Nolberto Solano from Aston Villa.

Souness's decision to pair Shearer and Owen together up front proved to be lethal, but Owen broke his fourth metatarsal bone in his foot after a clash with Paul Robinson in a match against Tottenham Hotspur, keeping him out for the rest of the season. With Owen injured the team's form dipped.

Souness was sacked as manager following a 3–0 defeat to Manchester City in early February. Shay Given, Robbie Elliott and Alan Shearer have since stated that the fans never really took to him, with his favouritism of players damaging morale and a series of injuries leading to poor form.

United's youth academy director, former West Ham United manager Glenn Roeder, was put in charge as caretaker manager. Upon Roeder's first game in charge, against Portsmouth, Alan Shearer scored his 201st goal for the club, breaking Jackie Milburn's record of 200 goals for the club and becoming the club's highest ever goalscorer.

Despite speculation that Bolton Wanderers manager Sam Allardyce was interested in taking charge, Roeder guided Newcastle from 15th place to 7th place by the end of the season, winning 9 out of their remaining 14 Premier League games to see the club qualify for the UEFA Intertoto Cup - a great way for club legend Alan Shearer to end his playing career. Despite the exit from the FA Cup at the hands of Chelsea, Roeder was praised for amazingly achieving a European spot, having seen the prospect of a relegation battle when he joined. At the end of the season he was given a two-year contract by chairman Freddie Shepherd.

== Final league table ==
Pos	Team	Pld	W	D	L	GF	GA	GD	Pts	Qualification or relegation
5	Tottenham Hotspur	38	18	11	9	53	38	+15	65	Qualification for the UEFA Cup first round (Note: Since Manchester United qualified for the Champions League, their place in the UEFA Cup as League Cup winners passed down to the league and was awarded to Blackburn Rovers as the highest-placed team not already qualified for European competitions.)
6	Blackburn Rovers	38	19	6	13	51	42	+9	63	Qualification for the UEFA Cup first round
7	Newcastle United	38	17	7	14	47	42	+5	58	Qualification for the Intertoto Cup third round
8	Bolton Wanderers	38	15	11	12	49	41	+8	56	
9	West Ham United	38	16	7	15	52	55	−3	55	Qualification for the UEFA Cup first round (Note: Since Liverpool had already qualified for the Champions League, their UEFA Cup berth as the FA Cup winners went to West Ham, who were the FA Cup runners-up.)

Source: Barclays Premier League
Rules for classification: 1) points; 2) goal difference; 3) number of goals scored.

== Kit ==
Newcastle's kit for the 2005–06 season was produced by German company Adidas. The main shirt sponsor was British bank Northern Rock.

== Transfers ==
=== In ===
Date	Player	Previous club	Cost	Ref.
15 June 2005	Scott Parker (ENG)	Chelsea	£6,500,000	
19 July 2005	Emre Belözoğlu (TUR)	Internazionale (ITA)	£3,800,000	
19 July 2005	Tim Krul (NED)	ADO Den Haag (NED)	Undisclosed	
29 July 2005	Craig Moore (AUS)	Borussia Mönchengladbach (GER)	Free	
2 August 2005	Lee Clark (ENG)	Fulham	Free	
26 August 2005	Albert Luque (ESP)	Deportivo de La Coruña (ESP)	£9,500,000	
31 August 2005	Michael Owen (ENG)	Real Madrid (ESP)	£17,000,000	
31 August 2005	Nolberto Solano (PER)	Aston Villa	£1,500,000	

=== Out ===
Date	Player	Buying club	Cost	Ref.
13 June 2005	Andrew O'Brien (IRL)	Portsmouth	£2,000,000	
15 June 2005	Laurent Robert (FRA)	Portsmouth	Loan	
7 July 2005	Craig Bellamy (WAL)	Blackburn Rovers	£4,900,000	
8 July 2005	Darren Ambrose (ENG)	Charlton Athletic	Undisclosed	
3 August 2005	Nicky Butt (ENG)	Birmingham City	Loan	
23 August 2005	Hugo Viana (POR)	Valencia (ESP)	Loan	
31 August 2005	Jermaine Jenas (ENG)	Tottenham Hotspur	£7,000,000	
31 August 2005	James Milner (ENG)	Aston Villa	Loan	
31 August 2005	Alan O'Brien (IRE)	Carlisle United	Loan	
16 February 2006	Daryl Smylie (NIR)	Stockport County	Loan	
1 March 2006	Hugo Viana (POR)	Valencia (ESP)	£1,700,000	

== First-team squad ==
The following players made appearances for the first-team squad this season.

Note: Flags indicate national team as defined under FIFA eligibility rules; some limited exceptions apply. Players may hold more than one non-FIFA nationality.

No.	Pos.	Nation	Player
1	GK	IRL	Shay Given
2	DF	IRL	Stephen Carr
3	DF	ENG	Robbie Elliott
4	MF	PER	Nolberto Solano
5	MF	TUR	Emre Belözoğlu
6	DF	FRA	Jean-Alain Boumsong
8	MF	ENG	Kieron Dyer
9	FW	ENG	Alan Shearer
10	FW	ENG	Michael Owen
11	MF	ENG	Lee Bowyer
12	GK	ENG	Steve Harper
14	MF	FRA	Charles N'Zogbia
15	MF	SEN	Amdy Faye

No.	Pos.	Nation	Player
17	MF	ENG	Scott Parker
18	DF	AUS	Craig Moore
19	DF	ENG	Titus Bramble
20	MF	ESP	Albert Luque
21	MF	ENG	Lee Clark
23	FW	ENG	Shola Ameobi
26	DF	ENG	Peter Ramage
27	DF	ENG	Steven Taylor
28	FW	ENG	Michael Chopra
33	DF	NGA	Celestine Babayaro
35	MF	RSA	Matty Pattison
37	MF	IRL	Alan O'Brien
39	MF	ENG	Martin Brittain

=== Left club during season ===
Note: Flags indicate national team as defined under FIFA eligibility rules; some limited exceptions apply. Players may hold more than one non-FIFA nationality.

No.	Pos.	Nation	Player
7	MF	ENG	Jermaine Jenas (to Tottenham Hotspur)
16	MF	ENG	James Milner (on loan to Aston Villa)
20	MF	POR	Hugo Viana (on loan to Valencia)

No.	Pos.	Nation	Player
40	GK	ENG	Ben Smith (to Stockport County)
—	MF	FRA	Laurent Robert (to Benfica)
—	MF	ENG	Nicky Butt (on loan to Birmingham City)

=== Coaching staff ===
Position	Staff
Manager	(England) Glenn Roeder
Assistant manager	(England) Lee Clark
First team coach	(England) Nigel Pearson
Goalkeeping coach	(England) Andy Woodman
Development coach	(England) Arthur Cox
Reserve team coach	(France) David Ginola
Chief scout	(Scotland) Steve Clarke

Last updated: 3 May 2011

=== Reserve squad ===
The following players spent most of the season playing for the reserves, and did not appear for the first team this season.

Note: Flags indicate national team as defined under FIFA eligibility rules; some limited exceptions apply. Players may hold more than one non-FIFA nationality.

No.	Pos.	Nation	Player
24	GK	ENG	Tony Caig
36	DF	ENG	Kris Gate
38	MF	NIR	Daryl Smylie
54	DF	ENG	Paul Huntington
—	GK	ENG	Mark Cook
—	GK	ENG	Fraser Forster
—	GK	NED	Tim Krul
—	DF	ENG	Liam Atkin
—	DF	ENG	Craig Baxter
—	DF	ENG	Phil Cave
—	DF	ENG	Chris Farman
—	DF	ENG	Chris Shanks
—	DF	CAN	David Edgar

No.	Pos.	Nation	Player
—	MF	ENG	Nicky Deverdics
—	MF	ENG	Mark Doninger
—	MF	ENG	Robert Cavener
—	MF	ENG	Dean Critchlow
—	MF	ENG	Callum Little
—	MF	COD	Kazenga LuaLua
—	MF	AUS	James Troisi
—	FW	ENG	Andy Carroll
—	FW	ENG	Carl Finnigan
—	FW	ENG	Scott Marshall
—	FW	ENG	Marc Walton
—		ENG	Michael Terrell
—			Glen Reay

=== Trialists ===
Note: Flags indicate national team as defined under FIFA eligibility rules; some limited exceptions apply. Players may hold more than one non-FIFA nationality.

No.	Pos.	Nation	Player
—	DF	FRA	Yohan Lachor (on trial from Lens)
—	FW	ENG	Fabian Pritchard (on trial from N/A)
—	DF	ITA	Francesco Coco (on trial from Inter Milan)
—	DF	GER	Frank Wiblishauser (on trial from 1. FC Nürnberg)

No.	Pos.	Nation	Player
—	DF	CMR	Jean-Hugues Ateba (on trial from Paris Saint-Germain)
—	FW	DEN	Nicki Bille Nielsen (on trial from Frem)

== Match results ==
=== Pre-season ===
6 August 2005	Newcastle United	5–0	Yeading	Newcastle upon Tyne
15:00 BST	Moore 39'; Milner 79'; Emre 79'; Ameobi 90', 90'			Stadium: St James' Park; Attendance: 6,151; Referee: Clive Oliver

9 August 2005	Bray Wanderers	1–7	Newcastle United	Bray
19:45 BST	Georgescu 53'		Ameobi 37', 45'; Dyer 47'; Milner 49'; N'Zogbia 66', 83'; Chopra 75'	Stadium: Carlisle Grounds; Attendance: 3,500; Referee: Ian Stokes

2 September 2005	Málaga	2–0	Newcastle United	Málaga
22:00	Hidalgo 76' (pen.); Couñago 80'			Stadium: Estadio La Rosaleda; Attendance: 9,750; Referee: Rafael Ramirez Dominguez

=== UEFA Intertoto Cup ===
17 July 2005 Third round first leg	FK Dubnica	1–3	Newcastle United	Dubnica nad Váhom
16:00	Tesak 13'	Report	Chopra 4'; Svestka 6' (o.g.); Milner 70'	Stadium: Mestský štadión Attendance: 6,200; Referee: Alon Yefet

23 July 2005 Third round 2nd leg	Newcastle United	2–0	FK Dubnica	Newcastle upon Tyne
15:00	Shearer 71', 90'	Report		Stadium: St James' Park; Attendance: 25,135; Referee: Knut Kircher

27 July 2005 Semi–finals 1st leg	Deportivo de La Coruña	2–1	Newcastle United	A Coruña
21:00	Rubén Castro 11'; Andrade 58'	Report	Bowyer 48'	Stadium: Estadio Riazor; Attendance: 12,000; Referee: Serge Gumienny

3 August 2005 Semi–finals 2nd leg	Newcastle United	1–2	Deportivo de La Coruña	Newcastle upon Tyne
19:45	Milner 39'	Report	Andrade 45'; Munitis 48'	Stadium: St James' Park; Attendance: 34,215; Referee: Helmut Fleischer

=== Premier League ===
==== Results per matchday ====
Matchday	1	2	3	4	5	6	7	8	9	10	11	12	13	14	15	16	17	18	19	20	21	22	23	24	25	26	27	28	29	30	31	32	33	34	35	36	37	38
Ground	A	H	A	H	H	A	H	A	A	H	A	H	A	A	H	H	A	A	A	H	A	H	A	H	A	H	H	H	A	H	A	H	A	H	A	H	A	H
Result	L	D	L	L	D	W	W	D	L	W	W	W	L	L	D	W	W	L	L	D	L	L	L	W	W	D	W	W	L	L	L	W	W	W	W	W	D	W
Position	19	16	18	19	19	14	11	11	13	11	10	10	12	12	12	10	10	10	11	11	13	14	15	15	14	13	11	10	12	12	13	12	10	9	7	7	7	7

A = Away; H = Home; W = Win; D = Draw; L = Loss

14 August 2005 1	Arsenal	2–0	Newcastle United	London
13:30	Henry 81' (pen.) van Persie 87'	Report	Jenas (red card) 32'	Stadium: Highbury; Attendance: 38,072; Referee: Steve Bennett

20 August 2005 2	Newcastle United	0–0	West Ham United	Newcastle upon Tyne
15:00		Report	Konchesky (red card) 55'	Stadium: St James' Park; Attendance: 51,620; Referee: Dermot Gallagher

24 August 2005 3	Bolton Wanderers	2–0	Newcastle United	Bolton
20:00	Diouf 37'; Giannakopoulos 50'	Report		Stadium: Reebok Stadium; Attendance: 29,504; Referee: Rob Styles

28 August 2005 4	Newcastle United	0–2	Manchester United	Newcastle upon Tyne
16:00		Report	Rooney 66' van Nistelrooy 90'	Stadium: St James' Park; Attendance: 52,327; Referee: Howard Webb

10 September 2005 5	Newcastle United	1–1	Fulham	Newcastle upon Tyne
15:00	N'Zogbia 78'; Parker (yellow card) 83' (red card)	Report	McBride 13'	Stadium: St James' Park; Attendance: 52,208; Referee: Alan Wiley

18 September 2005 6	Blackburn Rovers	0–3	Newcastle United	Blackburn
14:00		Report	Shearer 62'; Owen 66'; Taylor (red card) 72'; N'Zogbia 85'	Stadium: Ewood Park; Attendance: 20,725; Referee: Mike Riley

24 September 2005 7	Newcastle United	1–0	Manchester City	Newcastle upon Tyne
15:00	Owen 18'	Report		Stadium: St James' Park; Attendance: 52,280; Referee: Graham Poll

1 October 2005 8	Portsmouth	0–0	Newcastle United	Portsmouth
15:00		Report		Stadium: Fratton Park; Attendance: 20,220; Referee: Steve Bennett

15 October 2005 9	Wigan Athletic	1–0	Newcastle United	Wigan
12:45	Roberts 40'; McCulloch (red card) 85'	Report		Stadium: JJB Stadium; Attendance: 22,374; Referee: Phil Dowd

23 October 2005 10	Newcastle United	3–2	Sunderland	Newcastle upon Tyne
13:30	Ameobi 34', 37'; Emre 63'	Report	Lawrence 35'; Elliott 41'	Stadium: St James' Park; Attendance: 52,302; Referee: Rob Styles

30 October 2005 11	West Bromwich Albion	0–3	Newcastle United	West Bromwich
16:00		Report	Owen 46', 78'; Shearer 80'	Stadium: The Hawthorns; Attendance: 26,216; Referee: Howard Webb

5 November 2005 12	Newcastle United	1–0	Birmingham City	Newcastle upon Tyne
15:00	Emre 78'	Report		Stadium: St James' Park; Attendance: 52,191; Referee: Mike Dean

19 November 2005 13	Chelsea	3–0	Newcastle United	London
15:00	Cole 47'; Crespo 51'; Duff 90'	Report		Stadium: Stamford Bridge; Attendance: 42,268; Referee: Mark Halsey

27 November 2005 14	Everton	1–0	Newcastle United	Liverpool
13:30	Yobo 46'	Report		Stadium: Goodison Park; Attendance: 36,207; Referee: Howard Webb

3 December 2005 15	Newcastle United	1–1	Aston Villa	Newcastle upon Tyne
15:00	Shearer 32' (pen.)	Report	McCann 75'	Stadium: St James' Park; Attendance: 52,267; Referee: Alan Wiley

10 December 2005 16	Newcastle United	1–0	Arsenal	Newcastle upon Tyne
15:00	Solano 82'	Report	Silva (yellow card) 57' (red card)	Stadium: St James' Park; Attendance: 52,297; Referee: Dermot Gallagher

17 December 2005 17	West Ham United	2–4	Newcastle United	London
15:30	Solano 20' (o.g.); Harewood 73' (pen.)	Report	Owen 5', 43', 90'; Shearer 66'	Stadium: Boleyn Ground; Attendance: 34,836; Referee: Phil Dowd

26 December 2005 18	Liverpool	2–0	Newcastle United	Liverpool
15:00	Gerrard 14'; Crouch 43'	Report	Bowyer (red card) 66'	Stadium: Anfield; Attendance: 44,197; Referee: Mark Halsey

31 December 2005 19	Tottenham Hotspur	2–0	Newcastle United	London
13:00	Tainio 43'; Mido 66'	Report		Stadium: White Hart Lane; Attendance: 36,246; Referee: Howard Webb

2 January 2006 20	Newcastle United	2–2	Middlesbrough	Newcastle upon Tyne
15:00	Solano 27'; Clark 90+3'	Report	Yakubu 54'; Hasselbaink 87'	Stadium: St James' Park; Attendance: 52,302; Referee: Steve Bennett

14 January 2006 21	Fulham	1–0	Newcastle United	London
15:00	Malbranque 75'	Report		Stadium: Craven Cottage; Attendance: 21,974; Referee: Alan Wiley

21 January 2006 22	Newcastle United	0–1	Blackburn Rovers	Newcastle upon Tyne
15:00			Pedersen 75'	Stadium: St James' Park; Attendance: 51,323; Referee: Howard Webb

1 February 2006 23	Manchester City	3–0	Newcastle United	Manchester
19:45	Riera 14'; Cole 38'; Vassell 62'	Report		Stadium: City of Manchester Stadium; Attendance: 42,413; Referee: Chris Foy

4 February 2006 24	Newcastle United	2–0	Portsmouth	Newcastle upon Tyne
15:00	N'Zogbia 41'; Shearer 64'	Report		Stadium: St James' Park; Attendance: 51,627; Referee: Mark Halsey

11 February 2006 25	Aston Villa	1–2	Newcastle United	Birmingham
15:00	Moore 16'	Report	Ameobi 2'; N'Zogbia 29'; Babayaro (red card) 61'	Stadium: Villa Park; Attendance: 37,140; Referee: Mike Riley

22 February 2006 26	Newcastle United	0–0	Charlton Athletic	Newcastle upon Tyne
19:45		Report		Stadium: St James' Park; Attendance: 50,451; Referee: Uriah Rennie

25 February 2006 27	Newcastle United	2–0	Everton	Newcastle upon Tyne
17:15	Solano 64', 76'	Report		Stadium: St James' Park; Attendance: 51,916; Referee: Graham Poll

4 March 2006 28	Newcastle United	3–1	Bolton Wanderers	Newcastle upon Tyne
15:00	Solano 64'; Shearer 45'; Ameobi 70'	Report	Davies 72'	Stadium: St James' Park; Attendance: 52,012; Referee: Alan Wiley

12 March 2006 29	Manchester United	2–0	Newcastle United	Manchester
13:30	Rooney 8', 12'	Report		Stadium: Old Trafford; Attendance: 67,858; Referee: Rob Styles

19 March 2006 30	Newcastle United	1–3	Liverpool	Newcastle upon Tyne
	Ameobi 41'; Boumsong (red card)	Report	Crouch 10'; Gerrard 35'; Cissé 52' (pen.)	Stadium: St James' Park; Attendance: 52,302; Referee: Mike Riley

26 March 2006 31	Charlton Athletic	3–1	Newcastle United	London
14:00	Bent 24' (pen.); Bowyer 37' (o.g.); Bothroyd 89'	Report	Parker 35'	Stadium: The Valley; Attendance: 27,019; Referee: Mark Halsey

1 April 2006 32	Newcastle United	3–1	Tottenham Hotspur	Newcastle upon Tyne
15:00	Bowyer 2'; Ameobi 25'; Shearer 30' (pen.)	Report	Keane 19'; Dawson (yellow card) 61' (red card)	Stadium: St James' Park; Attendance: 52,185; Referee: Mike Dean

9 April 2006 33	Middlesbrough	1–2	Newcastle United	Middlesbrough
15:00	Boateng 79'	Report	Boateng 29' (o.g.); Ameobi 44'	Stadium: Riverside Stadium; Attendance: 31,202; Referee: Alan Wiley

15 April 2006 34	Newcastle United	3–1	Wigan Athletic	Newcastle upon Tyne
15:00	Shearer 28' (pen.), 66'; Bramble 36'	Report	Bullard 5'	Stadium: St James' Park; Attendance: 52,302; Referee: Uriah Rennie

17 April 2006 35	Sunderland	1–4	Newcastle United	Sunderland
15:00	Hoyte 32'	Report	Chopra 60'; Shearer 61' (pen.); N'Zogbia 66'; Luque 87'	Stadium: Stadium of Light; Attendance: 40,032; Referee: Chris Foy

22 April 2006 36	Newcastle United	3–0	West Bromwich Albion	Newcastle upon Tyne
15:00	Solano 30'; Ameobi 40' (pen.), 90'	Report		Stadium: St James' Park; Attendance: 52,272; Referee: Howard Webb

29 April 2006 37	Birmingham City	0–0	Newcastle United	Birmingham
15:00		Report		Stadium: St Andrew's; Attendance: 28,331; Referee: Martin Atkinson

7 May 2006 38	Newcastle United	1–0	Chelsea	Newcastle upon Tyne
15:00	Bramble 73'; Carr (red card) 75'	Report		Stadium: St James' Park; Attendance: 52,309; Referee: Mike Riley

=== FA Cup ===
7 January 2006 Round 3	Newcastle United	1–0	Mansfield Town	Newcastle upon Tyne
15:00	Shearer 80'	Report		Stadium: St James' Park; Attendance: 41,459; Referee: Andy D'Urso

28 January 2006 Round 4	Cheltenham Town	0–2	Newcastle United	Cheltenham
12:30		Report	Chopra 41'; Parker 43'	Stadium: Whaddon Road; Attendance: 7,022; Referee: Mike Riley

18 February 2006 Round 5	Newcastle United	1–0	Southampton	Newcastle upon Tyne
17:40	Dyer 68'	Report		Stadium: St James' Park; Attendance: 40,975; Referee: Martin Atkinson

22 March 2006 Round 6	Chelsea	1–0	Newcastle United	London
20:05	Terry 4'	Report	Elliott (red card) 90'	Stadium: Stamford Bridge; Attendance: 42,279; Referee: Steve Bennett

=== League Cup ===
26 October 2005 Round 3	Grimsby Town	0–1	Newcastle United	Cleethorpes
19:45		Report	Shearer 80'	Stadium: Blundell Park; Attendance: 9,311; Referee: Mark Halsey

30 November 2005 Round 4	Wigan Athletic	1–0	Newcastle United	Wigan
19:45	Connolly 88' (pen.)	Report		Stadium: JJB Stadium; Attendance: 11,574; Referee: Steve Bennett

=== Alan Shearer testimonial ===
11 May 2006	Newcastle United	3–2	Celtic	Newcastle upon Tyne
19:45	Luque 70'; Lawson 90+1' (o.g.); Shearer 90+3' (pen.)	(Report)	Maloney 79' (pen.); Hartson 83'	Stadium: St James' Park; Attendance: 52,275; Referee: Mark Clattenburg

== Statistics ==
=== Appearances and goals ===
No.	Pos	Nat	Player	Total		Premier League		FA Cup		League Cup		UEFA Intertoto Cup	
No.	Pos	Nat	Player	Apps	Goals	Apps	Goals	Apps	Goals	Apps	Goals	Apps	Goals
Goalkeepers
1	GK	(Republic of Ireland) IRL	Shay Given	47	0	38	0	4	0	2	0	3	0
12	GK	(England) ENG	Steve Harper	1	0	0	0	0	0	0	0	1	0
Defenders
2	DF	(Republic of Ireland) IRL	Stephen Carr	24	0	19	0	2	0	0	0	3	0
3	DF	(England) ENG	Robbie Elliott	22	0	14+3	0	2	0	1	0	2	0
6	DF	(France) FRA	Jean-Alain Boumsong	41	0	30+3	0	3	0	1	0	4	0
18	DF	(Australia) AUS	Craig Moore	9	0	8	0	0+1	0	0	0	0	0
19	DF	(England) ENG	Titus Bramble	28	2	21+3	2	3	0	1	0	0	0
26	DF	(England) ENG	Peter Ramage	29	0	23	0	3+1	0	2	0	0	0
27	DF	(England) ENG	Steven Taylor	17	0	12	0	0	0	1	0	4	0
33	DF	(Nigeria) NGA	Celestine Babayaro	35	0	26+2	0	3	0	1	0	3	0
Midfielders
4	MF	(Peru) PER	Nolberto Solano	35	6	27+2	6	4	0	2	0	0	0
5	MF	(Turkey) TUR	Emre Belözoğlu	25	2	19+1	2	1+2	0	1	0	1	0
8	MF	(England) ENG	Kieron Dyer	13	1	4+7	0	2	1	0	0	0	0
11	MF	(England) ENG	Lee Bowyer	34	2	18+10	1	1+1	0	1	0	3	1
14	MF	(France) FRA	Charles N'Zogbia	41	6	27+5	5	2+1	0	2	0	3+1	1
15	MF	(Senegal) SEN	Amdy Faye	28	0	14+8	0	0	0	1+1	0	4	0
17	MF	(England) ENG	Scott Parker	32	2	26	1	3	1	2	0	1	0
21	MF	(England) ENG	Lee Clark	25	1	8+14	1	2	0	0+1	0	0	0
35	MF	(South Africa) RSA	Matty Pattison	3	0	2+1	0	0	0	0	0	0	0
37	MF	(Republic of Ireland) IRL	Alan O'Brien	4	0	0+3	0	0+1	0	0	0	0	0
39	MF	(England) ENG	Martin Brittain	6	0	0	0	1	0	0+2	0	0+3	0
Forwards
9	FW	(England) ENG	Alan Shearer	41	14	31+1	10	3	1	2	1	4	2
10	FW	(England) ENG	Michael Owen	11	7	10+1	7	0	0	0	0	0	0
20	FW	(Spain) ESP	Albert Luque	18	1	6+8	1	1+2	0	1	0	0	0
23	FW	(England) ENG	Shola Ameobi	34	9	25+5	9	3	0	0	0	0+1	0
28	FW	(England) ENG	Michael Chopra	20	3	6+7	1	1+1	1	1+1	0	1+2	1
Players transferred out during the season
7	MF	(England) ENG	Jermaine Jenas	5	0	3+1	0	0	0	0	0	1	0
16	MF	(England) ENG	James Milner	7	2	1+2	0	0	0	0	0	4	2
	MF	(England) ENG	Nicky Butt	2	0	0	0	0	0	0	0	2	0

Last updated: 30 May 2006
Source: Competitions
