= Barry Knight (referee) =

English football referee (born 1960)

- Born: 7 May 1960 (age 66); Orpington, Kent, England

Domestic
Years	League	Role
1991–1995	Southern Football League	Referee
1995–1999	Football League	Referee
1999–2008	Premier League	Referee

Barry Knight (born 7 May 1960) is an English retired professional football referee, who officiated primarily in the Premier League. He retired in 2008 due to injury.

== Career ==
Knight began refereeing in 1978, and in 1991 he became a Southern League referee.

In 1995, he was promoted to the National List of referees for the Football League.

He was promoted to the Premier League's list of referees from 1999, joining its Select Group of Referees on its establishment in 2001. His first appointment in England's top-flight was a game between Wimbledon and Middlesbrough on 10 August 1999 at Selhurst Park – a 3–2 away win for Boro.

In May 2000, during a Football League First Division play-off semi-final between Bolton Wanderers and Ipswich Town he issued 12 yellow and two red cards to Bolton players, and none to Ipswich players, whilst awarding three penalties in Ipswich's favour. Several Bolton staff, including manager Sam Allardyce, captain Guðni Bergsson, and midfielder Paul Warhurst, were fined by the Football Association for comments relating to Knight's officiating of the game. Knight was never appointed to referee a game at Bolton again.

In 2001, Knight took charge of the FA Youth Cup final, a 6–3 win for Arsenal against Blackburn Rovers.

He was the referee who, in 2005, sent-off Newcastle United teammates Lee Bowyer and Kieron Dyer for fighting during a match against Aston Villa. Eight-man Newcastle (Steven Taylor was also sent off for handball on the goal-line preventing a goal) eventually lost the match 3–0.

His officiating in the Premier League stopped suddenly after Blackburn Rovers' 2–1 home win over Birmingham City on 22 October 2005 due to a knee ligament injury he had suffered, and which took much time to recover from.

Knight returned to action on 17 March 2007 by fulfilling a fourth official posting in a Premier League fixture between Reading and Portsmouth.

He fully returned to active top-flight refereeing on 11 August 2007, when he took charge of a 2–1 away win by Leyton Orient at Southend United in the Football League One, during which he dismissed the home side's Alan McCormack. However, before Knight was able to make a return to the Premier League his injury re-occurred after a game on 28 August 2007. He recovered once again to take charge of only his fourth Football League game of the 2007–08 season in early January 2008, a 1–0 victory by Bradford City at Accrington Stanley. However, he sustained another injury and had to withdraw in the first half. He subsequently retired from refereeing.

== Statistics ==
Season	Games	Total (yellow card)	(yellow card) per game	Total (red card)	(red card) per game
1997–98	38	120	3.15	14	0.36
1998–99	40	151	3.77	13	0.32
1999–2000	36	125	3.47	8	0.22
2000–01	32	114	3.56	9	0.28
2001–02	29	102	3.51	7	0.24
2002–03	6	17	2.83	0	0.00
2003–04	30	95	3.16	9	0.30
2004–05	23	40	1.73	4	0.17
2005–06	15	22	1.42	3	0.20
2006–07	0	0	0.00	0	0.00
2007–08	4	10	2.50	2	0.50

Statistics for all competitions. There are no available records prior to 1997–98.
