= Kieron Dyer =

English footballer (born 1978)

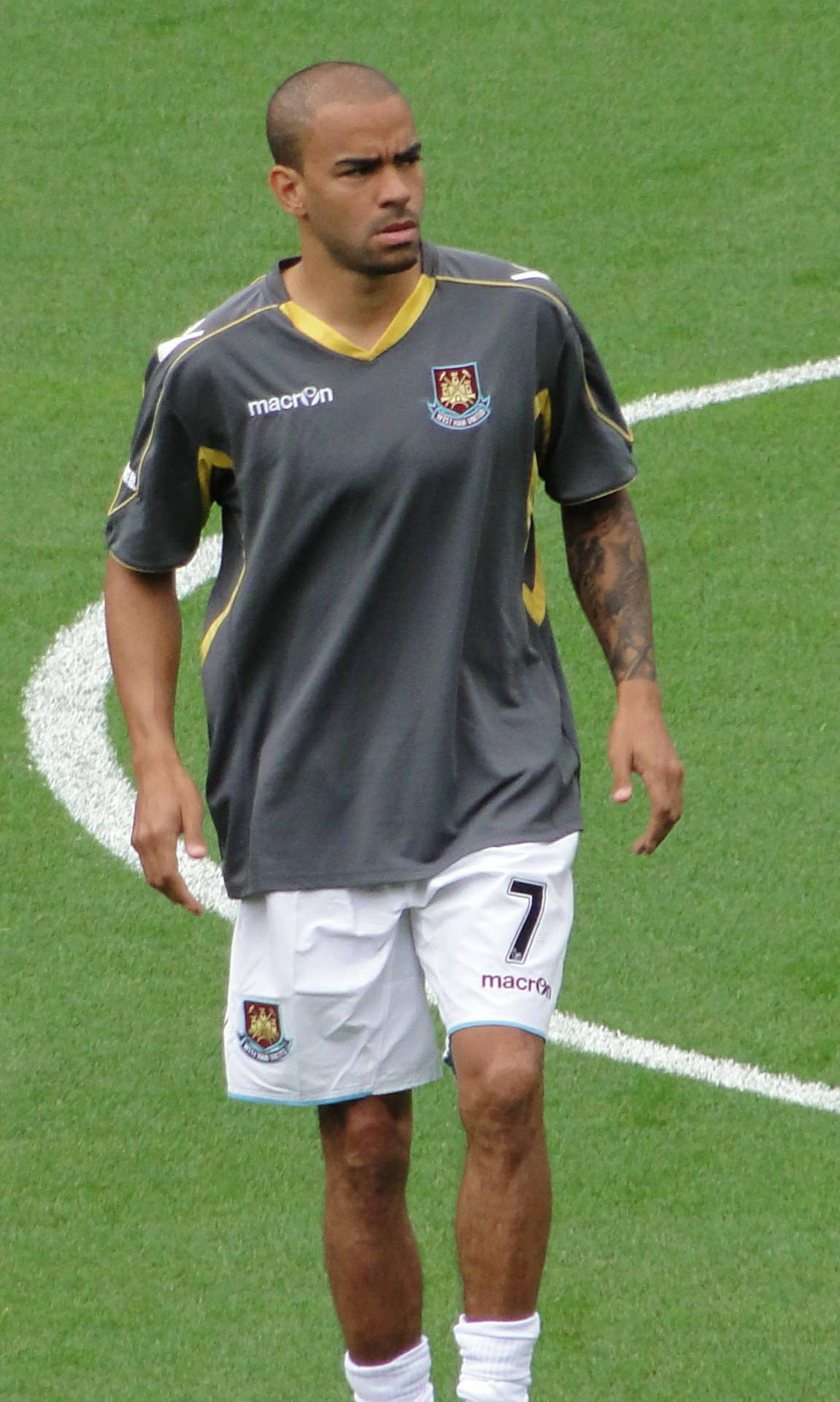
- Dyer training with West Ham United in 2010

Personal information
- Full name: Kieron Courtney Dyer
- Date of birth: 29 December 1978 (age 47)
- Place of birth: Ipswich, England
- Height: 5 ft 8 in (1.73 m)
- Position: Midfielder

Team information
- Current team: Southend United (head coach)

Youth career
- 1995–1996: Ipswich Town

Senior career*
Years	Team	Apps	(Gls)
1996–1999	Ipswich Town	91	(9)
1999–2007	Newcastle United	190	(23)
2007–2011	West Ham United	30	(0)
2011	→ Ipswich Town (loan)	4	(0)
2011–2013	Queens Park Rangers	5	(0)
2013	Middlesbrough	9	(2)
Total		329	(34)

International career
1997	England U20	4	(0)
1997–1999	England U21	11	(1)
1998	England B	3	(0)
1999–2007	England	33	(0)

Managerial career
- 2026–: Southend United
- * Club domestic league appearances and goals

Kieron Courtney Dyer (born 29 December 1978) is an English professional football coach and former player who is the head coach of National League club Southend United.

A midfielder, Dyer played youth football for his home club Ipswich Town before going on to make nearly 100 league appearances for the club's first team. He was sold to Newcastle United for £6 million, at the time the highest fee paid for an Ipswich player, and made nearly 200 appearances for Newcastle between 1999 and 2007. A move for the same fee to West Ham United followed, but Dyer suffered from various injuries, restricting him to 30 league appearances in four seasons. After a short loan back to Ipswich in March 2011, he signed for newly promoted club Queens Park Rangers ahead of their 2011–12 Premier League season. However, his time at QPR was again blighted by injuries and he made just eight appearances for the club before being released in January 2013, spending the rest of the season at Middlesbrough before retiring.

Dyer represented England on 33 occasions between 1999 and 2007. He was a member of the England squads which reached the quarter-finals at the 2002 FIFA World Cup and UEFA Euro 2004.

== Club career ==
=== Ipswich Town ===
Dyer was born in Ipswich, to an Antiguan father and English mother. Dyer's career began with his hometown team, Ipswich Town, whom he signed for as a 17-year-old trainee in 1996. He broke into the Ipswich first team during his first season at the club, and quickly established a reputation as one of the top youngsters in English football outside of the Premier League. He had spent three years at Portman Road when he requested a transfer in order to further his international prospects following Ipswich's failure to gain promotion to the Premier League through the play-offs in 1999.

=== Newcastle United ===
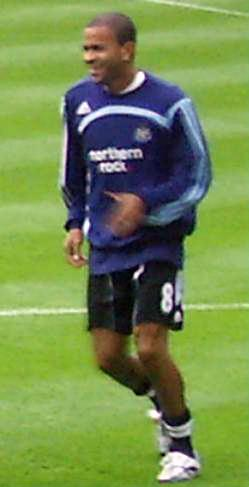
Dyer warming up for Newcastle in July 2007

Dyer was sold to Newcastle United in July 1999 for a fee of £6 million, which stood as the record transfer fee received by Ipswich Town until Connor Wickham was sold to Sunderland. He was the only English player signed by Ruud Gullit during his spell as Newcastle's manager. Dyer opened his Newcastle goalscoring account at home to local rivals Sunderland, but the match ended in a 2–1 defeat, which saw Gullit resign shortly afterwards.

Under Gullit's replacement, Bobby Robson, Dyer was a key player in the Newcastle team which finished fourth, third and fifth in the 2001–02, 2002–03 and 2003–04 Premier League seasons respectively.

On 2 April 2005, Dyer was involved in an on-pitch brawl with teammate Lee Bowyer in Newcastle's Premier League match with Aston Villa, and both had to be pulled apart and separated by their teammates and Villa players. This resulted in Dyer and Bowyer receiving red cards, leaving Newcastle with eight men as Steven Taylor had already been sent-off for a deliberate handball. Dyer was handed a three-match ban by the FA for the sending-off; Bowyer received a four-match ban from the FA and was fined more than six weeks' wages – about £200,000 – by Newcastle. Later in April, The FA increased Bowyer's ban by three more matches and fined him £30,000. In 2006 the Newcastle Magistrates' court fined Bowyer £600 and ordered him to pay £1,000 costs after he pleaded guilty to sparking the brawl.

At the start of the 2005–06 season, Dyer was once again on the injured list, this time with a hamstring injury, preventing his selection for club or country. This followed a close-season in which Newcastle manager Graeme Souness signed a number of other midfield players, including Emre Belözoğlu, Scott Parker, Albert Luque and Nolberto Solano.

Dyer returned to first-team action on 4 February 2006 against Portsmouth, Newcastle's first match following the departure of Souness. Dyer marked his first start of the season since the opening day against Arsenal with a goal in a FA Cup fifth round match against Southampton on 18 February 2006.

Dyer became the first Newcastle United player to score at the Emirates Stadium in a 1–1 draw with Arsenal on 18 November 2006. In what was his first start in seven months, Dyer opened the match's scoring after 30 minutes with his first league goal for Newcastle in over 20 months. He continued his rich vein of form, also scoring against Tottenham Hotspur, Bolton Wanderers, Birmingham City, Aston Villa, AZ and Watford. Following his return from injury, Dyer showed his versatility by playing in central midfield, right midfield and as an attacking midfielder, supporting Obafemi Martins.

Dyer was given permission to speak to West Ham United in August 2007 after both clubs agreed an undisclosed transfer fee. On 4 August, West Ham confirmed the deal had fallen through due to Newcastle's pulling out of the deal. However, the deal was rectified with Dyer finalising a move to Upton Park.

=== West Ham United ===
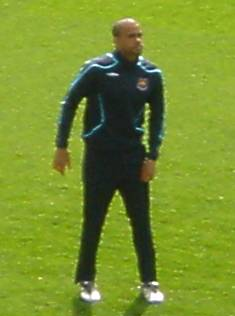
Dyer warming-up before game for West Ham, April 2009

Dyer completed a move to West Ham on 16 August 2007 for £6 million, signing a four-year deal. He made his debut for West Ham in a 1–0 away win at Birmingham City on 18 August 2007. However, this was one of the few positives in Dyer's time at West Ham as he was thereafter blighted by injury. Just ten days after his debut, he was stretchered off after a tackle by Joe Jacobson in a League Cup match against Bristol Rovers that resulted in his right leg being broken in two places. Dyer subsequently missed the rest of the 2007–08 season. His injury was re-assessed in August 2008, when it was decided that a six-week specialist rehabilitation programme was required before he began pre-season training.

During this time, Dyer's slow recovery from his injury sparked widespread speculation that his career may be over.

On 3 January 2009, Dyer made his comeback for West Ham after 17 months out, coming on as a second-half substitute against Barnsley in the FA Cup third round tie at the Boleyn Ground. Dyer's injuries continued in May 2009 when he was ruled out with a hamstring injury. He played in West Ham's first match of the 2009–10 season against Wolverhampton Wanderers, but had problems with injuries after the match. He managed only one more match, away to Blackburn Rovers, before hamstring problems hit again. He returned for two further matches before another injury in September kept him out until returning in a reserve match against Stoke City in November when he scored two goals.

After taking over West Ham in January 2010, David Sullivan revealed the full extent of the club's debts, which totalled £110 million. Shortly afterwards, in addition to the swingeing cuts being made by vice-chairman Karren Brady, Sullivan suggested that Dyer should follow Dean Ashton into retirement; Sullivan expressed the club's frustration that Dyer, who was earning £60,000 per week, had only played 18 matches in three years. Dyer's hometown club Ipswich Town had expressed an interest in re-signing Dyer, but the move stalled amid reports Dyer had demanded a £1 million pay-off from West Ham; the media had also speculated about whether Dyer could actually pass a medical.

In May 2010, figures in The Daily Telegraph stated that Dyer, who had made only 22 appearances and had never played a full 90 minutes for West Ham, was the club's top earner on £83,000-a-week. His deal included £424,000-a-season for image rights and £100,000 in loyalty fees. Dyer was released by West Ham at the end of the 2010–11 season, after costing the club around £450,000 for every match he played in.

==== Return to Ipswich Town (loan) ====
On 11 March 2011, Dyer returned to his first club, Ipswich Town, on a month-long loan. He was handed the number 30 shirt. He made his second debut for Ipswich at Elland Road against Leeds United on 12 March before being substituted in the second half in a 0–0 draw.

In April 2011, West Ham manager Avram Grant refused a request by Ipswich to retain Dyer until the end of the 2010–11 season, and he returned to West Ham after having made four appearances for Ipswich.

=== Queens Park Rangers ===
In July 2011, Dyer signed a one-year contract with Queens Park Rangers. He made his debut on 13 August 2011, the opening day of the Premier League season, against Bolton Wanderers, but after just three minutes, he was stretchered off with an injured foot. During his recovery, he sustained ligament damage to his foot in a reserve match. This injury required surgery and he was ruled out for the remainder of the season. Because of his injury, Dyer was omitted from QPR's 25-man squad for the second half of the 2011–12 Premier League season. Despite only playing seven minutes of the 2011–12 season, Dyer signed a one-year contract extension with QPR to keep him at the club until the end of the 2012–13 season. Dyer scored his only goal for the club, in stoppage time, on 5 January 2013, in an FA Cup third round tie against West Bromwich Albion to finish the match 1–1, his first goal in almost six years. Just three days later, he was released from QPR by manager Harry Redknapp, who said, "[Dyer] wasn't in my plans."

In January 2013, after his release, Dyer began training with Ipswich Town to maintain fitness while looking for a new club.

=== Middlesbrough and retirement ===
Dyer had returned to Ipswich following his release from QPR and had returned to training with the Championship side in January 2013.

On 31 January 2013, Dyer signed a "short-term" contract with Championship club Middlesbrough. Dyer's Middlesbrough debut came on 2 February away at one of his previous clubs, Ipswich Town, with Boro losing 4–0. On 2 March, Dyer scored his first goal in a 2–1 home win over league leaders Cardiff City, his first league goal since 2007. On 16 April, in a 1–0 home win over Nottingham Forest, Dyer lasted the 90 minutes for the first time since he joined QPR back in 2010. At the end of his contract, Dyer was not offered an extension, and he left the club.

Dyer returned to Ipswich as an academy coach following his departure from Middlesbrough. He confirmed he had been back training with the first team during the close of the 2012–13 season. There was speculation in the local press at the time that he would soon rejoin for Ipswich, however he was not offered a contract and subsequently retired from playing – but remained at the club as an academy coach.

== International career ==
After representing England at Youth, Under 21 and "B" level, Dyer's debut for the senior team came on 4 September 1999 when he started in England's 6–0 win against Luxembourg. He was deployed out of position at right back, and was replaced by Gary Neville at half-time after injuring himself while setting up Alan Shearer's third goal of the match. The injury was not serious and he was able to make his second England appearance four days later, coming on as a late substitute for Steve McManaman in a 0–0 draw with Poland. England qualified for the Euro 2000 competition but Dyer was not selected for the squad for the tournament, though he had recovered from injury and taken part in pre-tournament friendlies against Argentina and Ukraine. Along with a number of other young players who failed to make the squad – including Rio Ferdinand, Frank Lampard, Michael Duberry, Jody Morris and Jonathan Woodgate – Dyer took a drunken holiday to the Cypriot resort of Ayia Napa. The holiday hit the headlines when a video of Dyer, Ferdinand and Lampard having sex with a number of women was leaked to The News of the World. Shortly after the story broke, it was revealed that Dyer had spent a night in hospital after being glassed in the face during a fight in an Ipswich night club.

Dyer returned to the England squad for the first game after Euro 2000 for the first qualifier for the 2002 FIFA World Cup, against Germany, the last football match at the original Wembley Stadium. England lost 1–0, after which manager Kevin Keegan resigned.

Despite having played only 45 minutes of football under new manager Sven-Göran Eriksson, Dyer was named in the squad for the 2002 World Cup. Two days after the squad was announced, Dyer suffered knee ligament damage after being tackled by Tahar El Khalej in a league game against Southampton. However, he recovered just in time to remain in the squad. He made three appearances, all as a substitute, in the tournament until England were eliminated in the quarter-finals by eventual champions Brazil.

Dyer played in several of Euro 2004 qualifiers but only had seven minutes on the pitch at Euro 2004, coming on as a late replacement for Wayne Rooney in England's second group match, against Switzerland. After making some appearances during England's FIFA World Cup 2006 qualifying Dyer's run in the England squad was ended by the recurrence of a hamstring injury while playing against Middlesbrough.

After almost two years without making an appearance for England, Dyer's form for Newcastle earned him a call up to Steve McClaren's England starting line-up for a friendly against Spain in February 2007. His most recent, and subsequently final, appearance for England came in a 2–1 friendly defeat to Germany in August 2007, Dyer replacing Alan Smith in the second half.

== Coaching career ==
Following his retirement from playing, Dyer took up a role as an academy coach at his first club Ipswich Town in 2014, becoming assistant manager of the under-18 youth team in August 2018. He departed the club in August 2019, outlining his intentions to move into first team management.

On 26 October 2020, Ipswich confirmed that Dyer would be returning to the club to become the head coach of the club's under-23 team. Dyer also became more actively involved in first-team affairs following the appointment of new manager Paul Cook in March 2021, often assisting with coaching and being present in the dugout. Dyer unexpectedly resigned from the role on 21 March 2022. In June 2023, Dyer joined Chesterfield as a first team coach, reuniting him with Cook as part of his backroom staff.

== Managerial career ==
=== Southend United ===
On 8 June 2026, Dyer was appointed head coach of National League club Southend United. His first match as manager was a 3–1 away win against Altrincham on the opening day of the 2026–27 season.

== Personal life ==
In November 2015, Dyer was named as a contestant on the fifteenth series of I'm a Celebrity...Get Me Out of Here!. He came fourth on the show after lasting 21 days, and donated his entire fee to the Jude Brady Foundation.

In February 2018, Dyer told the public that at the age of 11 he had been sexually abused by his great uncle Kenny, by then deceased.

Dyer competed in the third series of Celebrity SAS: Who Dares Wins in 2021. During filming, he clashed violently with instructor Jason Fox, which he attributed to the abuse he suffered as a child. Dyer was withdrawn with a collapsed lung, for which he was hospitalised in October. On 31 October, following a series of tests in hospital, Ipswich Town confirmed that he had been diagnosed with primary sclerosing cholangitis and would undergo a liver transplant. In October 2023, Dyer left hospital having had a successful liver transplant.

On 20 November 2024, Dyer received an apology in the high court after settling a phone-hacking case against the Daily Mirror in return for a financial payout. The Mirror's owners admitted to unlawfully intercepting Dyer's voicemails between March 2003 and December 2004.

== Career statistics ==
=== Club ===
Appearances and goals by club, season and competition
Club	Season	League			FA Cup		League Cup		Europe		Other		Total	
Club	Season	Division	Apps	Goals	Apps	Goals	Apps	Goals	Apps	Goals	Apps	Goals	Apps	Goals
Ipswich Town	1996–97	First Division	13	0	1	0	0	0	—		2 (Note: Appearances in First Division play-offs)	0	16	0
Ipswich Town	1997–98	First Division	41	4	2	0	7	1	—		2	0	52	5
Ipswich Town	1998–99	First Division	37	5	2	0	4	0	—		2	2	45	7
Ipswich Town	Total		91	9	5	0	11	1	—		6	2	113	12
Newcastle United	1999–2000	Premier League	30	3	6	1	0	0	3 (Note: Appearances in UEFA Cup)	0	—		39	4
Newcastle United	2000–01	Premier League	26	5	1	0	4	1	—		—		31	6
Newcastle United	2001–02	Premier League	18	3	2	0	1	0	0	0	—		21	3
Newcastle United	2002–03	Premier League	35	2	0	0	1	2	12 (Note: Appearances in UEFA Champions League)	2	—		48	6
Newcastle United	2003–04	Premier League	25	1	2	2	0	0	7 (Note: Two appearances in UEFA Champions League, five appearances in UEFA Cup)	0	—		34	3
Newcastle United	2004–05	Premier League	23	4	3	0	1	0	7	2	—		34	6
Newcastle United	2005–06	Premier League	11	0	2	1	0	0	0	0	—		13	1
Newcastle United	2006–07	Premier League	22	5	2	1	2	0	4	1	—		30	7
Newcastle United	Total		190	23	18	5	9	3	33	5	—		250	36
West Ham United	2007–08	Premier League	2	0	0	0	1	0	—		—		3	0
West Ham United	2008–09	Premier League	7	0	1	0	0	0	—		—		8	0
West Ham United	2009–10	Premier League	10	0	0	0	1	0	—		—		11	0
West Ham United	2010–11	Premier League	11	0	0	0	2	0	—		—		13	0
West Ham United	Total		30	0	1	0	4	0	—		—		35	0
Ipswich Town (loan)	2010–11	Championship	4	0	—		—		—		—		4	0
Queens Park Rangers	2011–12	Premier League	1	0	0	0	0	0	—		—		1	0
Queens Park Rangers	2012–13	Premier League	4	0	1	1	2	0	—		—		7	1
Queens Park Rangers	Total		5	0	1	1	2	0	—		—		8	1
Middlesbrough	2012–13	Championship	9	2	—		—		—		—		9	2
Career total			329	34	25	6	26	4	33	5	6	2	419	51

=== International ===
Appearances and goals by national team and year
National team	Year	Apps	Goals
England	1999	3	0
England	2000	5	0
England	2002	5	0
England	2003	6	0
England	2004	6	0
England	2005	3	0
England	2007	5	0
Total		33	0

== Honours ==
Newcastle United

- UEFA Intertoto Cup: 2006

Individual

- PFA Team of the Year: 1997–98 First Division, 1998–99 First Division, 2002–03 Premier League
