= Andrei Georgescu =

Romanian footballer

Andrei (Franco) Georgescu
Personal information
- Full name: Andrei Francesco Georgescu
- Date of birth: 12 March 1983 (age 43)
- Place of birth: Bucharest, Romania
- Height: 1.78 m (5 ft 10 in)
- Position: Forward

Youth career
- Dinamo Bucuresti

Senior career*
| Years | Team | Apps | (Gls) |
- Coresi
- Olimpia Ramnicu Sarat
- North Athletic
| 2005–2008 | Bray Wanderers | 58 | (13) |
| 2008 | → Shelbourne (loan) | 4 | (0) |
| 2009 | Belgrove | | |
| 2009 | Shelbourne | 1 | (0) |
| 2009 | Athlone Town | 12 | (2) |
| 2010 | Bray Wanderers | 3 | (0) |
| 2011 | Drogheda United | 0 | (0) |
- * Club domestic league appearances and goals

Andrei (Franco) Georgescu (born 12 March 1983) is a Romanian former professional footballer who played as a forward.

== Career ==
Georgescu was born in Bucharest, Romania. A former Dinamo Bucharest youth player, he also played for Coresi and Olimpia Ramnicu Sarat in his home country.

He signed for Bray Wanderers in July 2005 from Dublin AUL League side North Athletic. Georgescu who wears the squad number 9 at Bray made his debut for the Wicklow club on 15 July 2005 impressing to help the Seagulls to a 2–1 away victory over Waterford United. Georgescu, whose nickname is "Franco", became an instant favourite with Bray's supporters. He spent 3 years with Bray Wanderers until the 2008 season when he struggled to remain a permanent fixture in Bray's first team. As a result, Georgescu was loaned out to First Division title chasing side Shelbourne for the remainder of 2008. A combination of injuries and intense competition amongst Shelbourne's forward lineup saw Georgescu limited to 4 league appearances for Shels but nonetheless the Romanian striker showed glimpses of promise including scoring an equaliser for Shels in 1–1 friendly draw against English League 1 club Millwall. He made his competitive Shelbourne debut on 18 July 2008 in a 0–0 draw against Dundalk at Tolka Park. The striker joined Leinster Senior League Senior Division side Belgrove in early 2009 before he rejoined Shelbourne on 9 July 2009. Georgescu's second spell at Shelbourne lasted just two weeks and included 1 league appearance as a substitute. Georgescu joined First Division outfit Athlone Town in August 2009 and he scored 2 goals in 13 league and cup appearances for them that season.

Georgescu rejoined former club Bray Wanderers on 28 January 2010 but, after just 4 competitive appearances in his second spell, he parted ways with Bray in mid-season. In 2011 Franco retired from football and joined Dalkey United FC. He still coaches there now and he visits a number of schools around the dalkey area to teach them soccer.
