= Ben Smith (footballer, born 1986) =

English footballer

Personal information
- Full name: Benjamin David Smith
- Date of birth: 5 September 1986 (age 40)
- Place of birth: Whitley Bay, England
- Height: 1.86 m (6 ft 1 in)
- Position: Goalkeeper

Youth career
- 2004–2006: Newcastle United

Senior career*
Years	Team	Apps	(Gls)
2006	Stockport County	0	(0)
2006–2010	Doncaster Rovers	15	(0)
2007–2008	→ Lincoln City (loan)	9	(0)
2009	→ Morecambe (loan)	3	(0)
2010–2012	Shrewsbury Town	36	(0)
2012–2013	Rochdale	0	(0)
2013	Southport	2	(0)
Total		65	(0)
- * Club domestic league appearances and goals

Benjamin James Smith (born 5 September 1986) is an English football goalkeeper who last played for Southport. He also made senior appearances in the Football League for Doncaster Rovers and Lincoln City, and was part of the Shrewsbury Town squad which won promotion from League Two in the 2011–12 season.

== Career ==
He has previously been on the books of Newcastle United's youth team, spending a period on loan with Middlesbrough and on trial at Leeds United, before joining Stockport County on non-contract terms on 23 March 2006. He made his debut for Doncaster in a League Cup game against Wycombe Wanderers on 24 October 2006, which led to a run in the side as Rovers first choice goalkeeper, but the signing of ever-present goalkeeper Neil Sullivan saw Smith getting limited chances in the first team. He went on loan to Lincoln City in November 2007.

On 16 October 2009 Smith joined Morecambe on a one-month loan, to cover for injured Barry Roche.

In May 2010, Doncaster announced that he was one of 6 players not asked to re-sign.

On 29 July 2010, Smith joined League Two club Shrewsbury Town on a two-year contract after a successful trial period. In May 2012, Smith was released by the club following their promotion to Football League One, having lost his place earlier in the season to Chris Neal.

On 10 August 2012 it was announced that Smith had signed with League Two club Rochdale on non-contract terms to act as cover to first choice goalkeeper Josh Lillis. He then moved on to Conference Premier team Southport until the end of the season in March 2014. However, during his second start for the club, he suffered a torn groin muscle against Newport County, which ruled him out for the remainder of the season.

== Personal life ==
He is the son of the former goalkeeper Simon Smith. He attended Whitley Bay High School. Smith runs a number of businesses in Shrewsbury with his wife.

== Honours ==
Doncaster Rovers

- Football League One play-offs: 2008
