= Ben Webster (footballer) =

English footballer

Personal information
- Full name: Benjamin Webster
- Date of birth: 28 March 1986 (age 40)
- Place of birth: England
- Position: Midfielder

Youth career
- Newcastle United

Senior career*
Years	Team	Apps	(Gls)
- Västerås SK
- Newcastle Blue Star
- Alnwick Town
2009	MYPA	20	(0)
2011	Olympic Charleroi	2	(0)
- * Club domestic league appearances and goals

Benjamin Webster (born 28 March 1986) is an English former footballer who is last known to have played as a midfielder for Olympic Charleroi.

== Career ==
As a youth player, Webster joined the youth academy of English Premier League side Newcastle United, before joining Västerås SK in the Swedish lower leagues.

Before the 2009 season, he signed for Finnish club MYPA after playing for Alnwick Town in the English non-league.

In 2011, he signed for Belgian fourth division team Olympic Charleroi.
