= Daryl Smylie =

Northern Irish footballer

Personal information
- Full name: Daryl Smylie
- Date of birth: 10 September 1985 (age 41)
- Place of birth: Richhill, Northern Ireland
- Height: 1.85 m (6 ft 1 in)
- Position: Midfielder

Team information
- Current team: Mariebo IK (assistant manager)

Youth career
- Lurgan Town
- 2001–2004: Newcastle United

Senior career*
Years	Team	Apps	(Gls)
2004–2006	Newcastle United	0	(0)
2006	→ Stockport County (loan)	3	(0)
2006–2007	Livingston	17	(0)
2007–2008	Östersunds FK	17	(2)
2008	Ljungskile SK	12	(4)
2009–2011	Kalmar FF	13	(0)
2009	→ Jönköpings Södra (loan)	13	(4)
2010–2011	→ Jönköpings Södra (loan)	13	(2)
2012–2019	Jönköpings Södra	214	(60)
2020–2021	Assyriska IK	0	(0)

International career
- Northern Ireland U19
	Northern Ireland U21	7	(0)

Managerial career
- 2021-: Mariebo IK (assistant manager)
- * Club domestic league appearances and goals as of 20:44, 25 August 2020 (UTC)

Daryl Smylie (born 10 September 1985) is a former Northern Irish footballer and current assistant manager of Mariebo IK.

== Playing career ==
Smylie started playing football for his local Boys Brigade team in Richhill County Armagh. He then started playing for Lurgan Town Boys in the Lisburn league. When he turned 16 he joined the Newcastle United youth academy. During the last two years, he trained with the first team but failed to make any first team appearances. In the 2005/06 season Smylie spent time on loan at Stockport County where he made his league debut. He joined Scottish First Division club Livingston on a free transfer in the summer of 2006, but was released at the end of the 2006/07 season.

That summer after being released, Smylie joined Swedish third-tier club Östersunds FK and played the second half of the 2007 Swedish football Division 1 season. He returned to Östersund the next year and had enough success during the first half of the season to be signed by English manager David Wilson who was in charge of Allsvenskan club Ljungskile SK. The club was relegated at the end of the year. Still, another Allsvenskan club signed Smylie, Kalmar FF. However, he struggled for playing time and was loaned out twice to Superettan club Jönköpings Södra until Jönköping finally signed him permanently on a 2+1 year contract at the end of 2011. The club won promotion to Allsvenskan.

On 13 January 2020, Smylie moved to Swedish Division 1 Södra club Assyriska IK.

== Coaching career ==
After retiring from playing, Smylie was appointed as assistant coach of Mariebo IK in 2021.
