= Phil Cave =

English footballer

Personal information
- Full name: Philip Adam Cave
- Date of birth: 12 May 1987 (age 39)
- Place of birth: Newcastle upon Tyne, England
- Position: Defender

Senior career*
Years	Team	Apps	(Gls)
2003–2007	Newcastle United	0	(0)
2007–2008	Gateshead	41	(9)
2008–2009	Livingston	3	(0)
2009	→ Gateshead (loan)	17	(0)
2009–2010	Gateshead	18	(0)
2010–2012	Blyth Spartans	62	(3)
2012	Ashington	0	(0)
2012-2013	Bedlington Terriers		
2013-2016	Holland PH SC		
2016-2017	Bedlington Terriers		
- * Club domestic league appearances and goals as of 10:35, 14 July 2012 (UTC)

Philip Adam Cave (born 12 May 1987) is an English former footballer who last played for Bedlington Terriers as a left-sided defender.

== Career ==
Cave started off as a trainee at Newcastle United but did not make a first team appearance before signing for Gateshead in August 2007. Playing a pivotal role in a strong Gateshead side who won promotion via the play-offs, Cave then went on to sign for Livingston after a successful trial. After featuring mainly as a substitute for Livingston, Cave joined previous club Gateshead on loan until the end of the 2008–09 season. Cave rejoined Gateshead for the 2009–10 season. Cave was released by Gateshead at the end of the season. In July 2010 Conference North side Blyth Spartans announced the signing of Cave. After making 82 appearances in all competitions, scoring 3 goals, Cave left Blyth on 12 March 2012. Cave signed for Ashington on 25 May 2012.
