= Simon Smith (footballer) =

English footballer (born 1962)

Personal information
- Full name: Simon Timothy Gordon Smith
- Date of birth: 16 September 1962 (age 64)
- Place of birth: Newton Aycliffe, England
- Position: Goalkeeper

Senior career*
Years	Team	Apps	(Gls)
1978–1982	Newcastle United	0	(0)
?	Whitley Bay	0	(0)
1985–1995	Gateshead	501	(0)
?	Carlisle United	0	(0)
?	Sunderland	0	(0)
?	Newcastle United	0	(0)
Total		501	(0)

Managerial career
- 2015–2022: Newcastle United (head goalkeeping coach)
- * Club domestic league appearances and goals

Simon Timothy Gordon Smith (born 16 September 1962) is an English former footballer who previously worked as the head goalkeeping coach for Newcastle United.

== Playing career ==
Smith began his professional career with Newcastle United in 1978, spending four years there before moving on to Whitley Bay and then Gateshead, where he played 501 games, including a run of 405 games in a row, over a ten-year period. He also signed as a non-contract player for Carlisle United, Sunderland and again Newcastle United.

== Coaching career ==
Smith returned to Newcastle United in 1993 as a goalkeeping coach, working firstly at the Centre of Excellence and latterly as Academy goalkeeping coach working with goalkeepers from the age of 8–19.

In the summer of 1999, Smith became first-team goalkeeping coach working under Ruud Gullit and Sir Bobby Robson. He was Sir Bobby Robson's goalkeeping coach over a five-year period, coaching in the Premier League with goalkeepers Shay Given, Steve Harper, Lionel Perez, John Karelse and Tony Caig.

On 16 September 2004, Smith handed in his resignation and left the club. He was replaced by Roy Tunks.

Smith has since worked for the Football Association as the goalkeeping coach to the England under-19 and under-17 teams and as a goalkeeping scout identifying and reporting on current and possible England goalkeepers. He has also worked as goalkeeping coach to the women's national football team.

After successfully completing a B.A. Sports studies degree in 1995, Smith also set up his own goalkeeping coaching company, Simon Smith Goalkeeping. In 2005, Simon Smith Goalkeeping joined forces with Bobby Charlton Soccer and Sports Academy to provide a specialist coaching programme and specialist staff.

In 2006 Smith moved to Vancouver to undertake a year-long secondment to research the biomechanics of goalkeeping, during which time he worked as a consultant to the Canadian Soccer Association, working with the senior and under-20 national soccer team. He also worked in the MLS with Frank Yallop at the LA Galaxy, working with goalkeepers Steve Cronin and Kevin Hartman.

On 17 July 2007, Smith joined Carlisle United as a part-time goalkeeping coach. On 5 August 2008, he was replaced by Dave Timmins because the club was not satisfied with his only part-time involvement at the team.

Smith rejoined Newcastle in 2015 as the club's Head of Goalkeeping. He left the club in July 2022 saying "It has been a great privilege to work for Newcastle United Football Club and I have hugely enjoyed the many opportunities I've had to work with our first team goalkeepers throughout the years. I will continue watching and supporting the team and wish them every success for the future as I look forward to new challenges ahead."

During 2023–24 pre-season, Smith helped out at League One side Carlisle United by coaching the club's goalkeepers on a temporary basis.
