= Matty Pattison =

South African former soccer player

- Pattison with Newcastle United in 2007

Personal information
- Full name: Matthew Joseph Pattison
- Date of birth: 27 October 1986 (age 40)
- Place of birth: Johannesburg, South Africa
- Position: Midfielder

Youth career
- 2000–2005: Newcastle United

Senior career*
| Years | Team | Apps | (Gls) |
| 2005–2008 | Newcastle United | 10 | (0) |
| 2007–2008 | → Norwich City (loan) | 10 | (0) |
| 2008–2009 | Norwich City | 41 | (3) |
| 2009–2012 | Mamelodi Sundowns | 56 | (4) |
| 2012 | Engen Santos | 7 | (0) |
| 2012–2014 | Bidvest Wits | 31 | (5) |
| 2014–2016 | Gateshead | 54 | (4) |
| 2016–2017 | Blyth Spartans | | |
| 2017–2018 | South Shields | | |
| 2018–2020 | Whickham | | |
| 2020–2021 | Gateshead | | |
| 2021 | Dunston UTS | 5 | (0) |
| 2025–2026 | Birtley Town F.C. | 1 | (1) |

International career^{‡}
| 2010–2014 | South Africa | 5 | (0) |

Managerial career
- 2019–2020: Whickham
- * Club domestic league appearances and goals as of 8 May 2016 ‡ National team caps and goals as of 31 January 2012

Matthew Joseph Pattison (born 27 October 1986) is a South African former soccer player. He earned five international caps for South Africa between 2010 and 2014.

He began his senior career at Newcastle United in the Premier League, making 12 total appearances before moving to Norwich City in 2007, initially on loan. He played 51 times and scored four goals for Norwich. Pattison went back to South Africa in 2009 and represented Mamelodi Sundowns, Santos and Bidvest Wits. In 2014, he returned to England and played for several non-league clubs in the north east until his retirement in 2021.

== Early life ==
Pattison, who was born in Johannesburg, began to play soccer at an early age. He and his family then moved to England in 1997, when he was eleven years old. He joined Newcastle Youth Academy at the age of fourteen.

== Club career ==
=== Newcastle United ===
Pattison made his debut on 25 February 2006 as a last-minute substitute for Charles N'Zogbia in a 3–0 home win over Everton. He made his first start on 22 April in a 3–0 win over West Bromwich Albion also at St James' Park, in a much-changed team coping with injuries to players such as Alan Shearer and Michael Owen, that nonetheless finished 7th after six wins and a draw in the last seven fixtures.

=== Norwich City ===
Pattison joined Norwich City of the Championship for a short loan period in November 2007, following ex-manager Glenn Roeder. After making 10 appearances and impressing, the deal was made permanent once the transfer window opened on 4 January 2008 for an undisclosed fee, on a three-and-a-half-year contract.

Pattison scored his first career goal on 22 November 2008, opening a 2–1 win at Nottingham Forest, and followed it three days later with a consolation goal in a loss by the same score to Crystal Palace at Carrow Road. On 7 December, he scored his third goal in four games, concluding a 2–0 home win over Ipswich Town in an East Anglian derby.

After Roeder was replaced by new manager Bryan Gunn, Pattison played his last game against Doncaster Rovers on 30 January 2009. Gunn said in March that he would loan Pattison to a League One club if he received the right offer.

=== South Africa ===
On 3 August 2009 Pattison was reported by South African media to be leaving Norwich to play in South Africa, either for Mamelodi Sundowns or Orlando Pirates. On 6 August Pattison returned to his native South Africa to join Mamelodi Sundowns for an undisclosed fee in hope of breaking into the South African national team for the 2010 FIFA World Cup in South Africa.

Pattison went on trial at English Championship club Leeds United and scored a long-range goal in a 2–0 friendly win over Celtic in January 2012. He was also on trial at Hibernian in the Scottish Premier League.

Returning to his home country, Pattison signed a six-month deal with Engen Santos on 31 January 2012. He left by mutual consent on 1 May, with the club having three games left to avoid relegation. On 3 June, he joined Bidvest Wits.

=== Return to England ===
Pattison had trials at Milton Keynes Dons and Birmingham City in July and August 2014. The latter club's manager Lee Clark knew him as reserve manager of Newcastle.

On 3 October 2014, Pattison signed for Conference Premier club Gateshead until the end of the 2014–15 season, subject to international clearance. He made his debut on 11 October in a 1–1 draw with Forest Green Rovers. He scored his first goal for Gateshead on 11 November in a 3–3 draw with Lincoln City. After two seasons with the club, Pattison was released by Gateshead in May 2016.

On 24 May 2017, Pattison signed for Northern League club South Shields on a free transfer from Blyth Spartans. At the beginning of the 2018–19 season, he moved to Whickham and was named manager in November 2019.

After leaving Whickham in February 2020, Pattison was added to the first team squad at Gateshead, where he had been named Academy Coach whilst at Whickham.

On 19 August 2021, Pattison signed for Northern Premier League Division One East club Dunston UTS. He made his debut on 21 August coming off of the bench against Newcastle Benfield in a 2–1 win in the FA Cup preliminary round. Pattison made his final appearance for Dunston UTS after a substitute appearance in a 2–2 draw against Bamber Bridge in the FA Trophy third qualifying round, on 30 October. On 20 November, he retired.

== International career ==
On 31 October 2006, shortly after turning 20, Pattison was called up for the first time for a friendly against African champions Egypt at Griffin Park in London. He withdrew before the game due to a knee injury. He was selected for the nation's 2010 FIFA World Cup 29-man squad for a training camp in Durban from 15 to 28 January 2010, playing in an unofficial friendly match against Swaziland.

Pattison made his international debut for South Africa on 17 November 2010 in a 1–0 friendly loss to the United States at Cape Town Stadium, playing the last two minutes in place of Bernard Parker. He played six minutes on his second cap against Kenya on 9 February 2011. He was later called up as a late replacement for the injured Jabulani Shongwe in the 2014 African Nations Championship. He came off the bench against Mozambique on 11 January to win his third cap

== Coaching career ==
On 17 January 2022, Pattison was announced as a lead coach for i2i Soccer Academy.

On 8 June 2022, Pattison was also announced as head of youth development at Whickham FC.

On 12th January 2025, Pattison was announced as Assistant Manager of South Shields FC In January 2026, Pattison left the club to focus on business interests outside of football.

== Personal life ==
In March 2008, after a 2–0 Norwich City loss at Sheffield United, Pattison went clubbing in Norwich. Four hours after finishing his partying, he drove to training, and was arrested for driving at over twice the legal blood alcohol limit. At Norwich Magistrates Court, he was fined £2,300 and banned from driving for 20 months.

== Awards ==
Nedbank Cup Player of the Tournament: 2010
