= Martin Brittain =

English footballer (born 1984)

Personal information
- Date of birth: 29 December 1984 (age 41)
- Place of birth: Cramlington, England
- Position: Midfielder

Senior career*
Years	Team	Apps	(Gls)
2004–2006	Newcastle United	1	(0)
2006–2007	Ipswich Town	0	(0)
2006–2007	→ Yeovil Town (loan)	15	(0)
2007	Carlisle United	1	(0)
2008	Walsall	1	(0)
2008–2009	Kidderminster Harriers	42	(4)
2009–2012	Gateshead	67	(14)
2012	Celtic Nation	0	(0)
2012	Blyth Spartans	0	(0)
2012–2013	Bedlington Terriers		
- Ashington
Total		127	(18)
- * Club domestic league appearances and goals as of 13:00, 6 November 2012 (UTC)

Martin Brittain (born 29 December 1984) is an English former footballer who played as a winger. A boyhood Newcastle United supporter, Brittain progressed through the club's academy to make his senior debut for Newcastle United under Sir Bobby Robson on 3 March 2004 as a 76th-minute substitute for Michael Bridges in a 3–1 win over Vålerenga in the UEFA Cup third round. Brittain was also awarded the prestigious Jackie Milburn trophy in 2004 as Newcastle United young player of the year.

== Career ==
=== Newcastle United ===
Born in Cramlington, Northumberland, Brittain started his career at Newcastle United. Brittain made his debut for Newcastle under Sir Bobby Robson on 3 March 2004 as a 76th-minute substitute for Michael Bridges in a 3–1 win over Vålerenga in the UEFA Cup third round. Having been an unused substitute six days earlier in a 2–1 home win over Chelsea, he made his only Premier League appearance on 1 May in a 1–0 defeat at Manchester City, replacing Laurent Robert for the last 15 minutes.

His first start came on 7 January 2006 against Mansfield Town in the FA Cup third round, starting on the wide right of midfield in the game that Newcastle won 1–0. That game saw club striker Alan Shearer equal Jackie Milburn's goal scoring record, with Shearer grabbing his 200th goal for Newcastle. Brittain was not offered a new contract at Newcastle at the end of the 2005–06 season.

=== Ipswich Town ===
Following his release from Newcastle he subsequently trialed with Brighton & Hove Albion and Kilmarnock until having a successful trial with Ipswich Town. On 21 August 2006, he signed a one-year deal with Ipswich. Brittain made his debut for Ipswich in a League Cup game against Peterborough United with Ipswich going on to lose the game 4–2 on penalties. This proved to be his only game for the club as he was then loaned to Yeovil Town. After spending his only season with the club out on loan at Yeovil he was deemed surplus to requirements upon returning and was released in May 2007.

Yeovil Town (Loan)

After signing with Ipswich he then joined Yeovil on loan in league 1 for the 2006/2007 season. Britain made 16 appearances in total with 15 of those in the league but ultimately failed to score before returning to Ipswich at the end of the season.

=== Later career ===
Carlisle United

After being released by Ipswich Brittain joined Carlisle United on a week-long trial in July 2007 and after this trial period, Brittain joined the Brunton Park club on a monthly contract. After just one month at Carlisle Brittain was released from his contract having played just twice and only once in the league.

Walsall

After leaving Carlisle Brittain trailed for Scunthorpe United before joining Walsall. Brittain played once in the league and twice in the FA cup throughout the 2007–2008 season but had left by the start of the following season.

Kidderminster Harriers

In March 2008, Brittain joined Major League Soccer side Toronto FC on a trial, scoring a penalty in a 4–3 friendly loss to Houston Dynamo. However, he failed to earn himself a contract with the club. On 5 August 2008, he signed a one-year contract with Conference National side Kidderminster. In his first season at the club he became a regular first team player and impressed, scoring 8 goals in 51 games in all competitions.

Gateshead

On 26 June 2009, Brittain joined Gateshead, making his debut against Histon on 8 August. Brittain scored his first goals for the club against Crawley Town on 22 August. Brittain was seriously injured playing for Gateshead against Hayes & Yeading United on 5 September 2009. Brittain broke both his tibia and fibula. The game was abandoned after a 40-minute delay to treat the injury as Brittain's teammates refused to restart the game due to the shock of seeing the severity of the injury. At the time of the injury, the score was 0–0 with 14 minutes left to play. The Football Conference awarded one point to each team with Gateshead's point deducted for "failing to fulfil an engagement". Brittain returned to action on 8 July 2010, scoring the opening goal in a 3–2 defeat against a Middlesbrough XI in a behind closed doors friendly. Brittain was released by Gateshead on 30 April 2012.

Celtic Nation

In July 2012, Brittain joined Northern League Division One side Celtic Nation, but left before making a competitive appearance.

Blyth Spartans

On 20 September 2012, Brittain signed for Blyth Spartans. He made three appearances before being released on 11 October.

Bedlington Terriers

In November 2012, Brittain joined Bedlington Terriers on a free transfer.

Ashington A.F.C

In December 2013, Brittain joined Northern League Division One club Ashington. Brittain retired from football retired at the age of 31.

== Career statistics ==
As of 6 November 2012

Appearances and goals by club, season and competition
Club	Season	League^{[A]}		FA Cup		League Cup		Other^{[B]}		Total	
Club	Season	Apps	Goals	Apps	Goals	Apps	Goals	Apps	Goals	Apps	Goals
Newcastle United	2003–04	1	0	0	0	0	0	1	0	2	0
Newcastle United	2004–05	0	0	0	0	0	0	0	0	0	0
Newcastle United	2005–06	0	0	1	0	2	0	3	0	6	0
Newcastle United	Total	1	0	1	0	2	0	4	0	8	0
Ipswich Town	2006–07	0	0	0	0	1	0	0	0	1	0
Yeovil Town (loan)	2006–07	15	0	0	0	0	0	1	0	16	0
Carlisle United	2007–08	1	0	0	0	1	0	0	0	2	0
Walsall	2007–08	1	0	2	0	0	0	0	0	3	0
Kidderminster Harriers	2008–09	42	4	4	1	0	0	5	3	51	8
Gateshead	2009–10	6	2	0	0	0	0	0	0	6	2
Gateshead	2010–11	41	9	2	0	0	0	7	0	50	9
Gateshead	2011–12	20	3	3	0	0	0	1	0	24	3
Gateshead	Total	67	14	5	0	0	0	8	0	80	14
Celtic Nation	2012–13	0	0	0	0	0	0	0	0	0	0
Blyth Spartans	2012–13	0	0	2	0	0	0	1	0	3	0
Career totals		127	18	14	1	4	0	19	3	164	22

A. The "League" column constitutes appearances and goals (including those as a substitute) in the Premier League, Football League and Football Conference.
B. The "Other" column constitutes appearances and goals (including those as a substitute) in the Conference League Cup, FA Trophy, Football League Trophy, and Intertoto Cup.
