= 2003–04 Newcastle United F.C. season =

Newcastle United
2003–04 season
- Chairman: Freddie Shepherd
- Manager: Bobby Robson
- Stadium: St James' Park
- Premier League: 5th
- FA Cup: Fourth round
- League Cup: Third round
- Champions League: Third qualifying round
- UEFA Cup: Semi-finals
- Top goalscorer: League: Alan Shearer (22); All: Alan Shearer (28)
- Average home league attendance: 51,996
Home colours	Away colours	Third colours

During the 2003–04 season, Newcastle United participated in the FA Premier League. This season saw the club reach the semi-finals of the 2003–04 UEFA Cup.

Newcastle finished fifth in the Premiership at the end of the season, which ensured qualification for the UEFA Cup once again for the 2004–05 season. Many fans were left disgruntled that Newcastle did not make it into the Champions League.

== Season summary ==
Newcastle had finished the 2002–03 season third in the Premier League, entering the qualification rounds for the Champions League.

However, Newcastle did not qualify for the Champions League. They beat Partizan Belgrade 1–0 away from home, but then lost 1–0 at St James' Park and were eliminated via the penalty shootout. This defeat dropped Newcastle into the first round of the UEFA Cup.

Newcastle reached the semi-finals of the UEFA Cup, defeating Breda, Basel, Vålerenga, Mallorca and PSV in the competition. Newcastle were knocked out by Marseille in the semi-finals 2–0 on aggregate.

In the league, the team were unable to repeat the success of the previous two seasons as Liverpool pipped them to the fourth Champions League spot in the last week of the season. Newcastle were able to nip in ahead of Aston Villa and Charlton Athletic to take fifth place and qualify for the UEFA Cup.

The club could have finished higher if they hadn't started and ended the season with terrible runs. Newcastle failed to win until October in the league and ended the season by winning only one of their last seven league games. The club's away form was a major Achilles heel, with the club registering only 2 away wins (at Middlesbrough and Fulham in the space of 4 days) and a staggering 12 away draws.

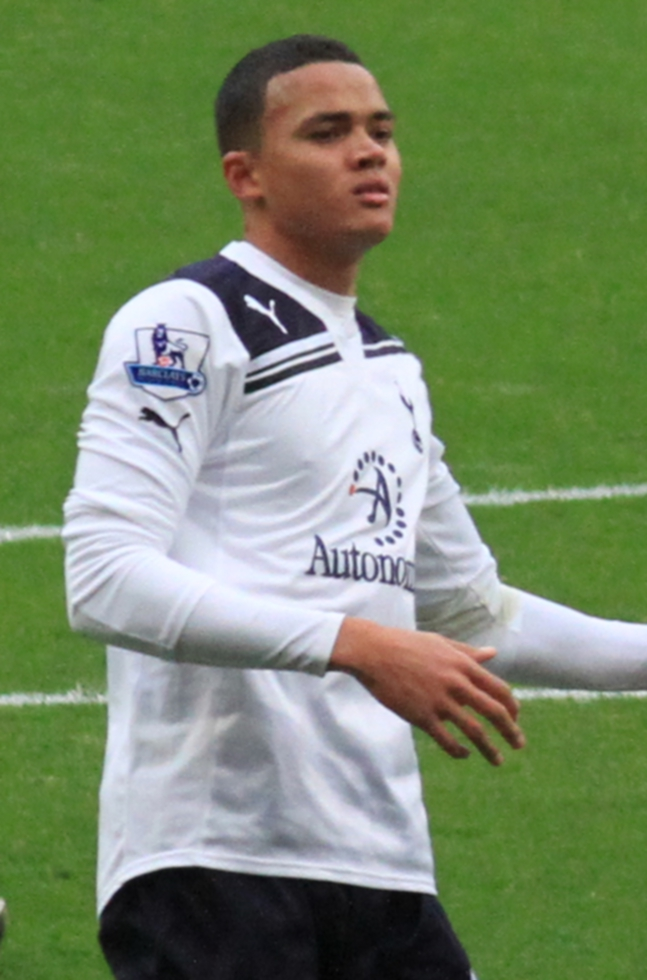
Jermaine Jenas

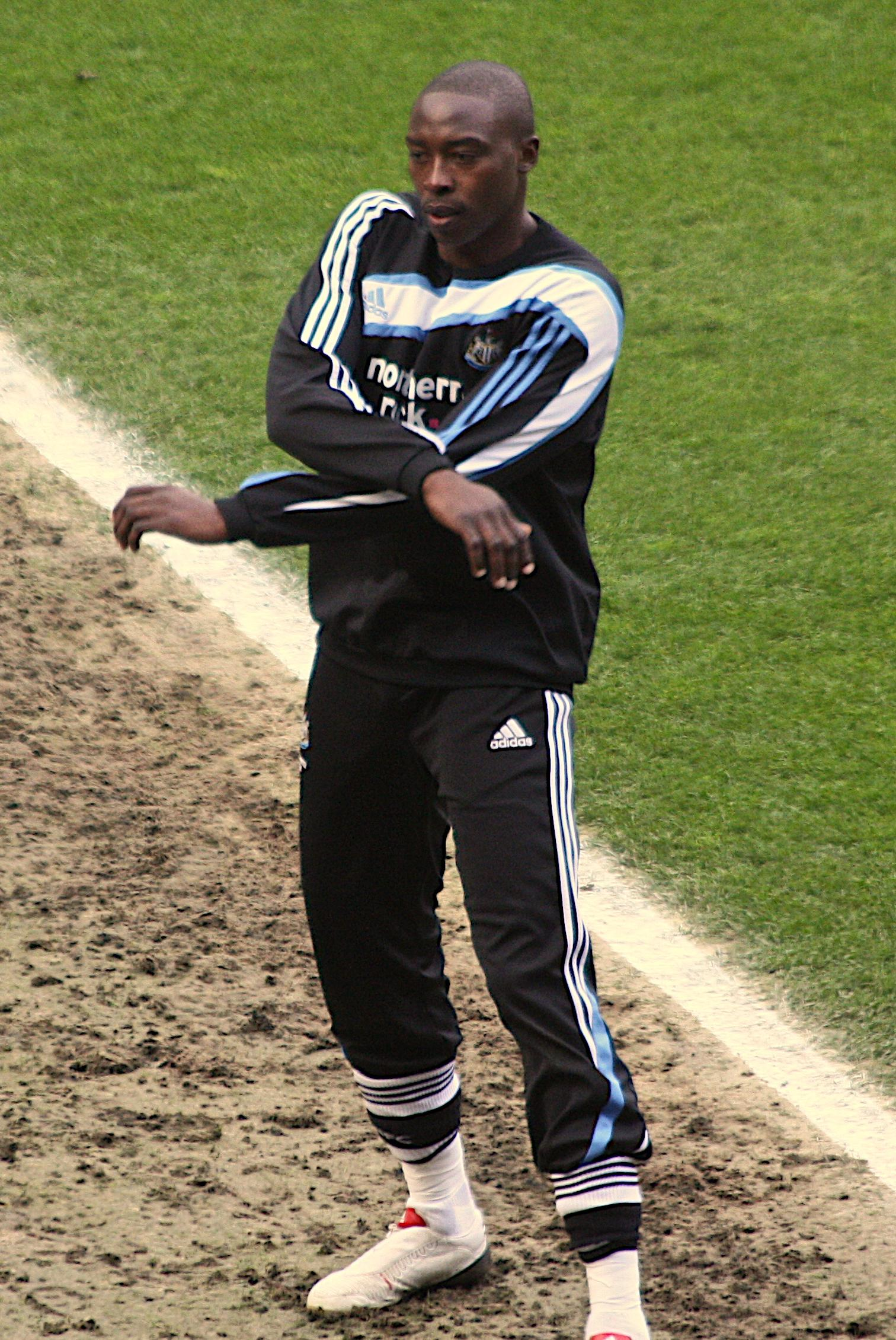
Shola Ameobi

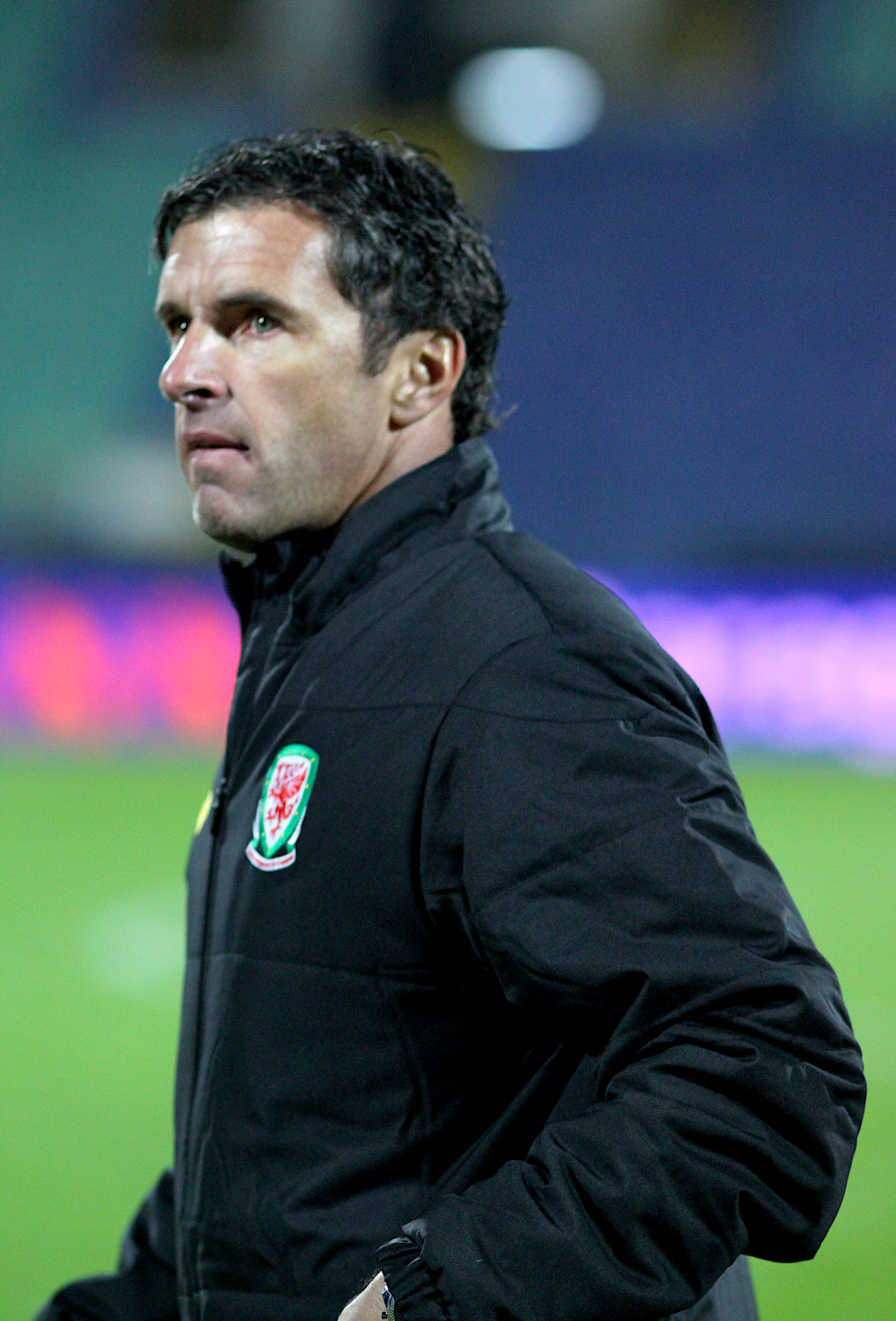
Gary Speed

== Final league table ==
Pos	Team	Pld	W	D	L	GF	GA	GD	Pts	Qualification or relegation
3	Manchester United	38	23	6	9	64	35	+29	75	Qualification for the Champions League third qualifying round (Note: Since Manchester United qualified for the Champions League, their place in the UEFA Cup as 2003–04 FA Cup winners went to First Division club Millwall, who were the FA Cup runners-up.)
4	Liverpool	38	16	12	10	55	37	+18	60	Qualification for the Champions League third qualifying round
5	Newcastle United	38	13	17	8	52	40	+12	56	Qualification for the UEFA Cup first round
6	Aston Villa	38	15	11	12	48	44	+4	56	
7	Charlton Athletic	38	14	11	13	51	51	0	53	

Source: Premier League
Rules for classification: 1) points; 2) goal difference; 3) number of goals scored.

== Team kit ==
The team kit for the 2003–04 season was produced by Adidas and the main shirt sponsor was Northern Rock.

== Club transfers ==
=== In ===
Date	Pos.	Name	From	Fee
1 July 2003	MF	(England) Lee Bowyer	(England) West Ham United	Free
2 February 2004	CF	(England) Michael Bridges	(England) Leeds United	Three-month loan

- Total spending: ▼£0

=== Out ===
Date	Pos.	Name	To	Fee
14 October 2003	MF	(Chile) Clarence Acuña	(Argentina) Rosario Central	Released
1 January 2004	DF	(Greece) Nikos Dabizas	(England) Leicester City	Free
25 January 2004	FW	(England) Carl Cort	(England) Wolverhampton Wanderers	£2,000,000
30 January 2004	MF	(Peru) Nolberto Solano	(England) Aston Villa	£1,500,000
30 January 2004	DF	(Scotland) Gary Caldwell	(Scotland) Hibernian	Released

- Total spending: ▲£3,500,000

== First-team squad ==
Squad at end of season

Note: Flags indicate national team as defined under FIFA eligibility rules; some limited exceptions apply. Players may hold more than one non-FIFA nationality.

No.	Pos.	Nation	Player
1	GK	IRL	Shay Given
2	DF	ENG	Andy Griffin
3	DF	ENG	Robbie Elliott
5	DF	IRL	Andy O'Brien
7	MF	ENG	Jermaine Jenas
8	MF	ENG	Kieron Dyer
9	FW	ENG	Alan Shearer (captain)
10	FW	WAL	Craig Bellamy
11	MF	WAL	Gary Speed (vice-captain)
12	GK	ENG	Steve Harper
14	FW	ENG	Michael Bridges
17	MF	ENG	Darren Ambrose
18	DF	NIR	Aaron Hughes
19	DF	ENG	Titus Bramble
20	FW	COD	Lomana LuaLua
21	MF	PAR	Diego Gavilán

No.	Pos.	Nation	Player
22	DF	ENG	Jamie McClen
23	FW	NGA	Shola Ameobi
24	GK	ENG	Tony Caig
25	MF	SCO	Brian Kerr
27	DF	ENG	Jonathan Woodgate
28	FW	ENG	Michael Chopra
29	MF	ENG	Lee Bowyer
30	DF	SCO	Steven Caldwell
32	MF	FRA	Laurent Robert
33	GK	ENG	Adam Collin
35	DF	FRA	Olivier Bernard
37	FW	COD	Calvin Zola
38	DF	ENG	Steven Taylor
39	MF	ENG	Martin Brittain
40	MF	ENG	Bradley Orr
45	MF	POR	Hugo Viana

=== Left club during season ===
Note: Flags indicate national team as defined under FIFA eligibility rules; some limited exceptions apply. Players may hold more than one non-FIFA nationality.

No.	Pos.	Nation	Player
4	MF	PER	Nolberto Solano (to Aston Villa)
6	MF	CHI	Clarence Acuña (released)
14	DF	ENG	Wayne Quinn (on loan to West Ham United)

No.	Pos.	Nation	Player
16	FW	ENG	Carl Cort (to Wolverhampton Wanderers)
34	DF	GRE	Nikos Dabizas (to Leicester City)
36	DF	SCO	Gary Caldwell (to Hibernian)

== Appearances, goals and cards ==
(Starting appearances + substitute appearances)

No.	Pos.	Name	League		FA Cup		League Cup		Champions League		UEFA Cup		Total		Discipline	
No.	Pos.	Name	Apps	Goals	Apps	Goals	Apps	Goals	Apps	Goals	Apps	Goals	Apps	Goals	Yellow card	Red card
1	GK	(Republic of Ireland) Shay Given	38	0	2	0	0	0	2	0	11	0	53	0	1	0
2	DF	(England) Andy Griffin	5	0	0	0	1	0	1	0	1	0	8	0	2	0
4	MF	(Peru) Nolberto Solano	8+4	0	2	0	1	0	2	1	2+1	0	15+5	1	0	0
5	DF	(Republic of Ireland) Andy O'Brien	27+1	1	1	0	0	0	2	0	10+1	0	40+2	1	5	2
7	MF	(England) Jermaine Jenas	26+5	2	2	0	1	0	0+2	0	10	1	39+7	3	5	0
8	MF	(England) Kieron Dyer	25	1	0	2	2	2	2	0	4+1	0	33+1	3	2	0
9	FW	(England) Alan Shearer	37	22	2	0	0+1	0	2	0	10	6	51+1	28	3	0
10	FW	(Wales) Craig Bellamy	13+3	4	0	0	0	0	1	0	6+1	5	20+4	9	4	0
11	MF	(Wales) Gary Speed	37+1	3	2	0	0+1	0	2	0	11	1	52+2	4	6	0
12	GK	(England) Steve Harper	0	0	0	0	1	0	0	0	1	0	2	0	0	0
14	FW	(England) Michael Bridges	0+6	0	0	0	0	0	0	0	1+2	0	1+8	0	1	0
17	MF	(England) Darren Ambrose	10+14	2	0+1	0	0+1	0	0	0	6+5	1	16+21	3	3	0
18	DF	(Northern Ireland) Aaron Hughes	34	0	2	0	0	0	1	0	10	0	47	0	1	0
19	DF	(England) Titus Bramble	27+2	0	1	0	1	0	0	0	11	3	40+2	3	9	0
20	FW	(Democratic Republic of the Congo) Lomana LuaLua	2+5	2	0+1	0	1	0	0+1	0	0+1	0	3+8	0	1	0
23	FW	(Nigeria) Shola Ameobi	18+8	7	0+1	0	1	0	1+1	0	7+4	3	27+14	10	2	0
27	DF	(England) Jonathan Woodgate	18	0	2	0	0	0	2	0	5	0	27	0	3	0
28	FW	(England) Michael Chopra	1+5	0	0	0	0	0	0	0	0	0	1+5	0	0	0
29	MF	(England) Lee Bowyer	17+7	0	0	0	0	0	0	0	0+1	0	17+8	2	6	0
30	DF	(Scotland) Steven Caldwell	3+2	0	0	0	1	0	0	0	0+1	0	4+3	0	1	0
32	MF	(France) Laurent Robert	31+4	6	2	2	1	1	1+1	0	11+1	3	46+6	12	1	1
35	DF	(France) Olivier Bernard	35	1	2	0	1	0	2	0	11	0	51	0	1	0
38	DF	(England) Steven Taylor	1	0	0	0	0	0	0	0	0+1	0	1+1	0	0	0
39	MF	(England) Martin Brittain	0+1	0	0	0	0	0	0	0	0+1	0	0+2	0	0	0
45	MF	(Portugal) Hugo Viana	5+11	0	0+1	0	1	0	1	0	4+4	0	11+16	0	3	0

=== Coaching staff ===
Position	Staff
Manager	(England) Bobby Robson
Assistant Manager	(England) John Carver
First Team coach	(England) Nigel Pearson
Goalkeeping Coach	(England) Simon Smith
Development Coach	(England) Arthur Cox
Reserve Team Coach	(Scotland) Steve Clarke
Chief scout	(France) David Ginola

Last updated: 3 May 2011

== Results ==
=== Pre-season ===
18 July 2003	Newcastle United	2–1	Doncaster Rovers	Newcastle upon Tyne
	Speed 20'; Dyer 30'		Gill 40'	Stadium: Darsley Park

24 July 2003 PL Asia Cup	Newcastle United	2–1	Birmingham City	Kuala Lumpur
20:45 MST; 08:00 UTC	Shearer 36' (pen.); Ameobi 75'		Devlin 72' (pen.)	Stadium: Bukit Jalil Stadium; Attendance: 14,600; Referee: Rob Styles

27 July 2003 PL Asia Cup	Chelsea	0–0 (a.e.t.) (5–4 p)	Newcastle United	Kuala Lumpur
20:45 MST; 08:00 UTC				Stadium: Bukit Jalil Stadium; Attendance: 41,500; Referee: Andy D'Urso
	Penalties
	Lampard (penalty scored); Duff (penalty missed); Huth (penalty scored); Guðjohnsen (penalty scored); Hasselbaink (penalty missed); Keenan (penalty scored); Terry (penalty scored)		(penalty missed) Shearer; (penalty missed) Robert; (penalty scored) Dyer; (penalty scored) Bowyer; (penalty scored) Bellamy; (penalty scored) Woodgate; (penalty missed) Jenas

1 August 2003	Sheffield Wednesday	4–3	Newcastle United	Sheffield
19:45	Owusu 2'; Smith 68'; Armstrong 77'; Kuqi 79'		Dyer 20'; Ameobi 46'; LuaLua 65'	Stadium: Hillsborough Stadium; Attendance: 14,995; Referee: Howard Webb

1 August 2003	Hartlepool United	0–6	Newcastle United	Hartlepool
19:15			Bellamy 9'; Shearer 17', 29', 35'; Solano 46'; Speed 53'	Stadium: Victoria Park; Attendance: 4,712

4 August 2003	Hull City	0–4	Newcastle United	Hull
19:45			Chopra 21', 59'; Ameobi 35'; Cort 90'	Stadium: Kingston Communications Stadium; Attendance: 15,206

5 August 2003	Newcastle United	2–2	Bayern Munich	Newcastle upon Tyne
	Shearer 39', 85'		Hargreaves 60'; Pizarro 89'	Stadium: St James' Park; Attendance: 32,277

=== Premier League ===
17 August 2003	Leeds United	2–2	Newcastle United	Leeds
	Viduka 24'; Smith 57'	Report	Shearer 20' (pen.), 88'	Stadium: Elland Road; Attendance: 36,766; Referee: Alan Wiley

23 August 2003	Newcastle United	1–2	Manchester United	Newcastle upon Tyne
	Shearer 26'	Report	van Nistelrooy 51'; Scholes 59'	Stadium: St James' Park; Attendance: 52,165; Referee: Uriah Rennie

30 August 2003	Newcastle United	0–1	Birmingham City	Newcastle upon Tyne
15:00		Report	Dunn 61'	Stadium: St James' Park; Attendance: 52,006; Referee: Matt Messias

13 September 2003	Everton	2–2	Newcastle United	Liverpool
	Naysmith (red card) 58'; Radzinski 67'; Ferguson 88' (pen.)	Report	Robert (yellow card) 40' (red card); Shearer 59' (pen.), 82' (pen.)	Stadium: Goodison Park; Attendance: 40,228; Referee: Rob Styles

20 September 2003	Newcastle United	0–0	Bolton Wanderers	Newcastle upon Tyne
		Report		Stadium: St James' Park; Attendance: 52,014; Referee: Graham Barber

26 September 2003	Arsenal	3–2	Newcastle United	London
	Henry 18', 80' (pen.); Silva 67'	Report	Robert 26'; Bernard 71'	Stadium: Highbury; Attendance: 38,112; Referee: Mike Riley

4 October 2003	Newcastle United	1–0	Southampton	Newcastle upon Tyne
	Shearer 44'	Report		Stadium: St James' Park; Attendance: 52,127; Referee: Phil Dowd

18 October 2003	Middlesbrough	0–1	Newcastle United	Middlesbrough
		Report	Ameobi 21'	Stadium: Riverside Stadium; Attendance: 34,081; Referee: Alan Wiley

21 October 2003	Fulham	2–3	Newcastle United	London
	Clark 6'; Saha 8'	Report	Robert 16'; Shearer 51', 56' (pen.)	Stadium: Loftus Road; Attendance: 16,506; Referee: Barry Knight

25 October 2003	Newcastle United	3–0	Portsmouth	Newcastle upon Tyne
	Speed 17'; Shearer 28' (pen.); Ameobi 61'	Report		Stadium: St James' Park; Attendance: 52,161; Referee: Paul Durkin

1 November 2003	Newcastle United	1–1	Aston Villa	Newcastle upon Tyne
15:00	Robert 45'	Report	Dublin 11'; McCann (yellow card) 70' (red card)	Stadium: St James' Park; Attendance: 51,975; Referee: Matt Messias

9 November 2003	Chelsea	5–0	Newcastle United	London
16:00	Johnson 25'; Crespo 40'; Lampard 42' (pen.); Duff 78'; Guðjohnsen 84'	Report	O'Brien (red card)	Stadium: Stamford Bridge; Attendance: 41,332; Referee: Paul Durkin

22 November 2003	Newcastle United	3–0	Manchester City	Newcastle upon Tyne
	Ameobi 57'; Shearer 77', 85'	Report		Stadium: St James' Park; Attendance: 51,159; Referee: Neale Barry

29 November 2003	Wolverhampton Wanderers	1–1	Newcastle United	Wolverhampton
	Blake 27'	Report	Shearer 31'	Stadium: Molineux Stadium; Attendance: 29,344; Referee: Steve Bennett

6 December 2003	Newcastle United	1–1	Liverpool	Newcastle upon Tyne
	Shearer 63' (pen.)	Report	Murphy 6'	Stadium: St James' Park; Attendance: 52,151; Referee: Graham Poll

13 December 2003	Newcastle United	4–0	Tottenham Hotspur	Newcastle upon Tyne
	Robert 35', 55'; Shearer 59', 66'	Report		Stadium: St James' Park; Attendance: 52,139; Referee: Alan Wiley

20 December 2003	Charlton Athletic	0–0	Newcastle United	London
		Report		Stadium: The Valley; Attendance: 26,508; Referee: Steve Bennett

26 December 2003	Leicester City	1–1	Newcastle United	Leicester
	Dickov 67'	Report	Ambrose 90'	Stadium: Walkers Stadium; Attendance: 32,148; Referee: Chris Foy

28 December 2003	Newcastle United	0–1	Blackburn Rovers	Newcastle upon Tyne
		Report	Gallagher 72'	Stadium: St James' Park; Attendance: 51,648; Referee: Mark Halsey

7 January 2004	Newcastle United	1–0	Leeds United	Newcastle upon Tyne
19:45	Shearer 4'	Report		Stadium: St James' Park; Attendance: 52,130; Referee: Phil Dowd

11 January 2004	Manchester United	0–0	Newcastle United	Manchester
16:05		Report		Stadium: Old Trafford; Attendance: 67,622; Referee: Paul Durkin

19 January 2004	Newcastle United	3–1	Fulham	Newcastle upon Tyne
20:00	O'Brien 4'; Speed 41'; Robert 54'	Report	Davis 74'	Stadium: St James' Park; Attendance: 50,104; Referee: Neale Barry

31 January 2004	Birmingham City	1–1	Newcastle United	Birmingham
15:00	John 90'	Report	Speed 37'	Stadium: St Andrew's; Attendance: 29,513; Referee: Rob Styles

7 February 2004	Newcastle United	3–1	Leicester City	Newcastle upon Tyne
15:00	Ameobi 30'; Taggart 37' (o.g.); Jenas 59'	Report	Ferdinand 80'	Stadium: St James' Park; Attendance: 52,125; Referee: Steve Dunn

11 February 2004	Blackburn Rovers	1–1	Newcastle United	Blackburn
20:00	Stead 85'	Report	Bellamy 52'	Stadium: Ewood Park; Attendance: 23,459; Referee: Matt Messias

21 February 2004	Newcastle United	2–1	Middlesbrough	Newcastle upon Tyne
15:00	Bellamy 63'; Shearer 83' (pen.)	Report	Zenden 33'	Stadium: St James' Park; Attendance: 52,156; Referee: Graham Poll

29 February 2004	Portsmouth	1–1	Newcastle United	Portsmouth
15:00	LuaLua 89'	Report	Bellamy 34'	Stadium: Fratton Park; Attendance: 20,140; Referee: Andy D'Urso

14 March 2004	Tottenham Hotspur	1–0	Newcastle United	London
15:00	O'Brien 86' (o.g.)	Report		Stadium: White Hart Lane; Attendance: 36,083; Referee: Howard Webb

20 March 2004	Newcastle United	3–1	Charlton Athletic	Newcastle upon Tyne
17:30	Shearer 2', 77'; Jenas 35'	Report	Jensen 54'	Stadium: St James' Park; Attendance: 51,847; Referee: Mike Riley

28 March 2004	Bolton Wanderers	1–0	Newcastle United	Bolton
14:00	Pedersen 4'	Report		Stadium: Reebok Stadium; Attendance: 27,360; Referee: Mike Dean

3 April 2004	Newcastle United	4–2	Everton	Newcastle upon Tyne
15:00	Bellamy 5'; Dyer 21'; Shearer 52', 90'	Report	Gravesen 12'; Yobo 81'	Stadium: St James' Park; Attendance: 42,155; Referee: Dermot Gallagher

11 April 2004	Newcastle United	0–0	Arsenal	Newcastle upon Tyne
16:05		Report		Stadium: St James' Park; Attendance: 52,141; Referee: Paul Durkin

18 April 2004	Aston Villa	0–0	Newcastle United	Birmingham
14:00		Report	O'Brien (red card) 10'	Stadium: Villa Park; Attendance: 40,786; Referee: Barry Knight

25 April 2004	Newcastle United	2–1	Chelsea	Newcastle upon Tyne
14:00	Ameobi 44'; Shearer 48'	Report	Cole 5'	Stadium: St James' Park; Attendance: 52,016; Referee: Rob Styles

1 May 2004	Manchester City	1–0	Newcastle United	Manchester
15:00	Wanchope 59'	Report		Stadium: City of Manchester Stadium; Attendance: 47,227; Referee: Mark Halsey

9 May 2004	Newcastle United	1–1	Wolverhampton Wanderers	Newcastle upon Tyne
15:00	Bowyer 38'	Report	Ganea 70'	Stadium: St James' Park; Attendance: 52,139; Referee: Matt Messias

12 May 2004	Southampton	3–3	Newcastle United	Southampton
20:00	Beattie 19'; Bramble 39' (o.g.); Griffit 88'	Report	Ameobi 7'; Bowyer 35'; Ambrose 90'	Stadium: St Mary's Stadium; Attendance: 31,815; Referee: Graham Poll

15 May 2004	Liverpool	1–1	Newcastle United	Liverpool
15:00	Owen 67'	Report	Ameobi 25'	Stadium: Anfield; Attendance: 44,172; Referee: Mike Riley

=== Champions League ===
13 August 2003 3rd qual rd. 1st leg	Partizan Belgrade (Serbia and Montenegro)	0–1	(England) Newcastle United	Belgrade
		Report	Solano 38'	Stadium: Stadion FK Partizan; Attendance: 32,500; Referee: Vladimir Hrinak (Slovakia)

27 August 2003 3rd qual rd. 2nd leg	Newcastle United (England)	0–1 (a.e.t.) (1–1 agg.) (3–4 p)	(Serbia and Montenegro) Partizan Belgrade	Newcastle upon Tyne
		Report	Iliev 50'	Stadium: St James' Park; Referee: Jan Wegereef (Netherlands)
	Penalties
	Shearer (penalty missed); Dyer (penalty missed); Woodgate (penalty missed); Ameobi (penalty scored); LuaLua (penalty scored); Jenas (penalty scored); Hughes (penalty missed)		(penalty missed) Malbaša; (penalty scored) Nađ; (penalty missed) Stojanoski; (penalty scored) Radaković; (penalty missed) Iliev; (penalty scored) Ilić; (penalty scored) Cirkovic

=== UEFA Cup ===
24 September 2003 R1 1st leg	Newcastle United (England)	5–0	(Netherlands) NAC Breda	Newcastle upon Tyne
	Bellamy 31', 37'; Bramble 59'; Shearer 77'; Ambrose 89'	Report		Stadium: St James' Park; Attendance: 36,007

15 October 2003 R1 2nd leg	NAC Breda (Netherlands)	0–1 (0–6 agg.)	(England) Newcastle United	Breda
		Report	Robert 86'	Stadium: Rat Verlegh Stadion; Attendance: 16,400; Referee: Espen Berntsen (Norway)

6 November 2003 R2 1st leg	FC Basel (Switzerland)	2–3	(England) Newcastle United	Basel
	Cantaluppi 11'; Chipperfield 15'	Report	Robert 14'; Bramble 37'; Ameobi 75'	Stadium: St. Jakob-Park; Attendance: 30,000; Referee: Tom Henning Øvrebø (Norway)

27 November 2003 R2 2nd leg	Newcastle United (England)	1–0 (4–2 agg.)	(Switzerland) FC Basel	Newcastle upon Tyne
	Smiljanić 14' (o.g.)	Report		Stadium: St James' Park; Attendance: 40,387; Referee: Knud Erik Fisker (Denmark)

26 February 2004 R3 1st leg	Vålerenga (Norway)	1–1	(England) Newcastle United	Oslo
	Normann 54'	Report	Bellamy 39'	Stadium: Ullevaal Stadion; Attendance: 17,039; Referee: Grzegorz Gilewski (Poland)

3 March 2004 R3 2nd leg	Newcastle United (England)	3–1 (4–2 agg.)	(Norway) Vålerenga	Newcastle upon Tyne
	Shearer 19'; Ameobi 47', 89'	Report	Hagen 25'	Stadium: St James' Park; Attendance: 38,531; Referee: Eric Braamhaar (Netherlands)

11 March 2004 R4 1st leg	Newcastle United (England)	4–1	(Spain) Mallorca	Newcastle upon Tyne
	Bellamy 67'; Shearer 71'; Robert 74'; Bramble 84'	Report	Moya (yellow card) 35' (red card); Correa 57'	Stadium: St James' Park; Attendance: 38,012; Referee: Alain Hamer (Luxembourg)

25 March 2004 R4 2nd leg	Mallorca (Spain)	0–3 (1–7 agg.)	(England) Newcastle United	Palma, Majorca
		Report	Shearer 46', 89'; Bellamy 78'	Stadium: Son Moix; Attendance: 11,500; Referee: Konrad Plautz (Austria)

8 April 2004 Quarter-final 1st leg	PSV Eindhoven (Netherlands)	1–1	(England) Newcastle United	Eindhoven
	Kežman 15'	Report	Jenas 45'	Stadium: Philips Stadion; Attendance: 35,000; Referee: Gilles Veissière (France)

14 April 2004 Quarter-final 2nd leg	Newcastle United (England)	2–1 (3–2 agg.)	(Netherlands) PSV Eindhoven	Newcastle upon Tyne
	Shearer 9'; Speed 66'	Report	Kežman 52' (pen.)	Stadium: St James' Park; Attendance: 50,083; Referee: Manuel Mejuto González (Spain)

22 April 2004 Semi-final 1st leg	Newcastle United (England)	0–0	(France) Marseille	Newcastle upon Tyne
		Report		Stadium: St James' Park; Attendance: 52,004; Referee: Valentin Ivanov (Russia)

6 May 2004 Semi-final 2nd leg	Marseille (France)	2–0 (2–0 agg.)	(England) Newcastle United	Marseille
	Drogba 18', 82'	Report		Stadium: Stade Vélodrome; Attendance: 57,500; Referee: Ľuboš Micheľ (Slovakia)

=== FA Cup ===
3 January 2004 Round 3	Southampton	0–3	Newcastle United	Southampton
		Report	Dyer 24', 67'; Robert 39'	Stadium: St Mary's Stadium; Attendance: 28,456; Referee: Mike Dean

24 January 2004 Round 4	Liverpool	2–1	Newcastle United	Liverpool
	Cheyrou 2', 61'	Report	Robert 4'	Stadium: Anfield; Attendance: 41,365; Referee: Graham Poll

=== League Cup ===
29 October 2003 Round 3	Newcastle United	1–2 (a.e.t.)	West Bromwich Albion	Newcastle upon Tyne
	Robert 79'	Report	Ameobi 29' (o.g.); Hughes 101'	Stadium: St James' Park; Attendance: 46,932; Referee: Neale Barry
