= 2002–03 Newcastle United F.C. season =

Newcastle United
2002–03 season
- Chairman: Freddie Shepherd
- Manager: Sir Bobby Robson
- Stadium: St James' Park
- Premier League: 3rd
- FA Cup: Third round
- League Cup: Third round
- UEFA Champions League: Second group stage
- Top goalscorer: League: Alan Shearer (17); All: Alan Shearer (25)
- Highest home attendance: 52,181 (vs. Sunderland)
- Lowest home attendance: 34,067 (vs. Željezničar)
- Average home league attendance: 51,923
Home colours	Away colours

During the 2002–03 English football season, Newcastle United participated in the FA Premier League (known as the FA Barclaycard Premiership for sponsorship reasons).

== Season summary ==
After a slow start, the club began putting together the wins and, by the end of March, were in a three-way title race with Manchester United and Arsenal. Consecutive defeats to a resurgent Everton and a 6–2 home thrashing by Alex Ferguson's side killed off Newcastle's title hopes, but Bobby Robson and his team was able to brush off the challenge from Chelsea to finish third in the Premier League, entering the qualification rounds for the Champions League in the 2003–04 season.

The 2002–03 season was a particularly colourful one for Newcastle on the European stage. In the first group stage, Newcastle lost their first three matches in a row, then, in an astonishing reversal, shocked Italian giants Juventus 1–0 at St James' Park. They then controversially beat Dynamo Kyiv 2–1 in Newcastle before winning the crucial last match, away to Feyenoord, 3–2 in injury time, with striker Craig Bellamy scoring the injury time winner. With Dynamo Kyiv losing at home to Juventus, Newcastle progressed to the second round, in a 'group of death' with Internazionale, Barcelona and Bayer Leverkusen.

Bellamy was sent off for lashing out at Inter defender Marco Materazzi in an off-the-ball incident during the opening minutes of the match. Bellamy was punished further by a three-match ban. Compounding the disaster for Newcastle was the suspension of influential captain Alan Shearer for a similar incident, although the punishment was just a two-match ban. Newcastle went on to lose 1–4 at home.

Shearer returned in the fourth game in the four-team group, scoring all three goals in a 3–1 demolition of Bayer Leverkusen at home. Despite a superb performance against Inter in the famous San Siro, only to draw 2–2, Newcastle lost at home 2–0 to Barcelona and dropped out of the Champions League.

== Final league table ==
Pos	Team	Pld	W	D	L	GF	GA	GD	Pts	Qualification or relegation
1	Manchester United (C)	38	25	8	5	74	34	+40	83	Qualification for the Champions League group stage
2	Arsenal	38	23	9	6	85	42	+43	78	Qualification for the Champions League group stage
3	Newcastle United	38	21	6	11	63	48	+15	69	Qualification for the Champions League third qualifying round
4	Chelsea	38	19	10	9	68	38	+30	67	Qualification for the Champions League third qualifying round
5	Liverpool	38	18	10	10	61	41	+20	64	Qualification for the UEFA Cup first round (Note: Since Liverpool qualified for the UEFA Cup via the league, their place in the UEFA Cup as League Cup winners reverted to the league and was awarded to Blackburn Rovers as the highest-placed team not already qualified for European competitions.)

Source: Premier League
Rules for classification: 1) points; 2) goal difference; 3) number of goals scored.
(C) Champions

== Team kit ==
The team kit for the 2002–03 season was produced by Adidas and the main shirt sponsor was NTL.

== Transfers ==
=== In ===
Date	Pos.	Name	From	Fee
20 June 2002	MF	(Portugal) Hugo Viana	(Portugal) Sporting CP	£8,500,000
12 July 2002	DF	(England) Titus Bramble	(England) Ipswich Town	£5,000,000
13 February 2003	DF	(England) Jonathan Woodgate	(England) Leeds United	£9,000,000
25 March 2003	FW	(England) Darren Ambrose	(England) Ipswich Town	£1,000,000

- Total spending: ▼£23.5m

=== Out ===
Date	Pos.	Name	To	Fee
April 2002	GK	(England) Jonny Brain	Unattached	Free
April 2002	DF	(Scotland) Ryan McGuffie	(Scotland) Gretna	Free
27 May 2002	MF	(England) Mark Boyd	(England) Port Vale	Free
April 2002	FW	(Scotland) Colin McMenamin	(Scotland) Livingston	Free
3 July 2002	DF	(England) James Coppinger	(England) Exeter City	Released
30 August 2002	DF	(England) David Cowan	(Scotland) Motherwell	Free
February 2003	MF	(England) Stuart Green	(England) Hull City	£150,000
January 2003	MF	(England) Tommy English	(Scotland) Livingston	Released
January 2003	MF	(England) Neale McDermott	(England) Fulham	Free
January 2003	MF	(Argentina) Christian Bassedas	(Argentina) Newell's Old Boys	Released
March 2003	GK	(Netherlands) John Karelse	(Netherlands) AGOVV Apeldoorn	Free
March 2003	MF	(Republic of Ireland) Joe Kendrick	(Germany) 1860 Munich	Free
January 2003	MF	(England) Damon Robson	Unattached	Free

- Total spending: ▲£150,000

== Players ==
=== First-team squad ===
Squad at end of season

Note: Flags indicate national team as defined under FIFA eligibility rules; some limited exceptions apply. Players may hold more than one non-FIFA nationality.

No.	Pos.	Nation	Player
1	GK	IRL	Shay Given
3	DF	ENG	Robbie Elliott
4	MF	PER	Nolberto Solano
5	DF	IRL	Andy O'Brien
6	MF	CHI	Clarence Acuña
7	MF	ENG	Jermaine Jenas
8	MF	ENG	Kieron Dyer
9	FW	ENG	Alan Shearer (captain)
10	FW	WAL	Craig Bellamy
11	MF	WAL	Gary Speed (vice-captain)
12	DF	ENG	Andy Griffin
13	GK	ENG	Steve Harper
14	DF	ENG	Wayne Quinn
16	FW	ENG	Carl Cort

No.	Pos.	Nation	Player
17	MF	ENG	Darren Ambrose
18	DF	NIR	Aaron Hughes
19	DF	ENG	Titus Bramble
20	FW	COD	Lomana LuaLua
22	MF	ENG	Jamie McClen
23	FW	NGA	Shola Ameobi
25	MF	SCO	Brian Kerr
27	DF	ENG	Jonathan Woodgate
28	FW	ENG	Michael Chopra
30	DF	SCO	Steven Caldwell
32	MF	FRA	Laurent Robert
34	DF	GRE	Nikos Dabizas
35	DF	FRA	Olivier Bernard
45	MF	POR	Hugo Viana

=== Left club during season ===
Note: Flags indicate national team as defined under FIFA eligibility rules; some limited exceptions apply. Players may hold more than one non-FIFA nationality.

No.	Pos.	Nation	Player
15	DF	ESP	Marcelino (to Poli Ejido)
17	MF	ARG	Christian Bassedas (released)

No.	Pos.	Nation	Player
31	MF	ENG	Stuart Green (to Hull City)

=== Reserve squad ===
The following players did not appear for the first-team this season.

Note: Flags indicate national team as defined under FIFA eligibility rules; some limited exceptions apply. Players may hold more than one non-FIFA nationality.

No.	Pos.	Nation	Player
21	MF	PAR	Diego Gavilán
24	GK	ENG	Tony Caig
29	GK	NED	John Karelse
33	GK	ENG	Adam Collin
36	DF	SCO	Gary Caldwell

No.	Pos.	Nation	Player
37	FW	COD	Calvin Zola
—	DF	ENG	Bradley Orr
—	DF	ENG	Steven Taylor
—	MF	IRL	Alan O'Brien
—	MF	RSA	Matty Pattison

=== Trialists ===
Note: Flags indicate national team as defined under FIFA eligibility rules; some limited exceptions apply. Players may hold more than one non-FIFA nationality.

No. / Pos. / Nation / Player; — / GK / ENG / Russell Howarth (on trial from York City)	No. / Pos. / Nation / Player; — / DF / NGA / Isaac Okoronkwo (on trial from Shakhtar Donetsk)

== Coaching staff ==
Position	Staff
Manager	(England) Bobby Robson
Assistant manager	(England) John Carver
First-team coach	(England) Nigel Pearson
Goalkeeping coach	(England) Andy Woodman
Development coach	(England) Arthur Cox
Reserve team coach	(England) Terry McDermott
Chief scout	(Scotland) Steve Clarke

Last updated: 3 May 2011

== Appearances, goals and cards ==
(Starting appearances + substitute appearances)

No.	Pos.	Name	League		FA Cup		League Cup		Champions League		Total		Discipline	
No.	Pos.	Name	Apps	Goals	Apps	Goals	Apps	Goals	Apps	Goals	Apps	Goals	Yellow card	Red card
1	GK	(Republic of Ireland) Shay Given	38	0	1	0	0	0	12	0	51	0	0	0
3	DF	(England) Robbie Elliott	0+2	0	0	0	1	0	0+1	0	1+3	0	0	0
4	MF	(Peru) Nolberto Solano	29+2	7	1	0	0+1	0	10+2	1	40+5	8	1	0
5	DF	(Republic of Ireland) Andy O'Brien	26	0	1	0	0	0	11+1	0	38+1	0	1	0
6	MF	(Chile) Clarence Acuña	2+2	0	1	0	1	0	0	0	4+2	0	0	0
7	MF	(England) Jermaine Jenas	23+9	6	1	1	0	0	8	0	31+9	7	1	0
8	MF	(England) Kieron Dyer	33+2	2	0	0	1	2	11+1	2	45+3	6	1	0
9	FW	(England) Alan Shearer	35	17	1	1	0	0	12	7	48	25	8	0
10	FW	(Wales) Craig Bellamy	27+2	7	1	0	0	0	6	2	34+2	9	3	1
11	MF	(Wales) Gary Speed	23+1	2	0	0	0	0	12	1	35+1	3	5	0
12	DF	(England) Andy Griffin	22+5	1	1	0	1	0	11	1	35+5	2	7	1
13	GK	(England) Steve Harper	0	0	0	0	1	0	2	0	3	0	0	0
14	DF	(England) Wayne Quinn	0	0	0	0	0	0	0+1	0	0+1	0	0	0
16	FW	(England) Carl Cort	0+1	0	0	0	1	0	0+1	0	1+2	0	0	0
17	MF	(England) Darren Ambrose	0+1	0	0	0	0	0	0	0	0+1	0	0	0
18	DF	(Northern Ireland) Aaron Hughes	35	1	1	0	0	0	11+1	0	47+1	1	2	0
19	DF	(England) Titus Bramble	13+3	0	0	0	0	0	8	0	21+3	0	4	0
20	FW	(Democratic Republic of the Congo) Lomana LuaLua	5+6	2	0+1	0	1	0	5+4	2	11+11	4	3	0
22	MF	(England) Jamie McClen	0+1	0	0	0	0	0	0	0	0+1	0	0	0
23	FW	(Nigeria) Shola Ameobi	8+20	5	0+1	0	0	0	4+6	3	12+27	8	4	0
25	MF	(Scotland) Brian Kerr	4+4	0	0	0	0	0	1+1	0	5+5	0	0	0
27	DF	(England) Jonathan Woodgate	10	0	0	0	0	0	0	0	10	0	1	0
28	FW	(England) Michael Chopra	0+1	0	0	0	0+1	0	0+2	0	0+4	0	0	0
30	DF	(Scotland) Steven Caldwell	12+2	1	0	0	1	0	1+1	0	14+3	1	1	1
32	MF	(France) Laurent Robert	25+2	5	1	0	0+1	0	9+2	0	35+5	5	3	1
34	DF	(Greece) Nikos Dabizas	13+3	0	0+1	0	1	0	7+1	0	21+5	0	6	1
35	DF	(France) Olivier Bernard	24+6	2	1	0	1	0	8+2	0	34+8	2	7	0
45	MF	(Portugal) Hugo Viana	11+12	2	0	0	1	0	5+5	2	17+17	4	5	0

== Matches ==
=== Pre-season ===
20 July 2002 Dutch Tour	vv Capelle	0 – 4	Newcastle United	Capelle aan den IJssel
			Robert 29'; Ameobi 65'; Solano 83'; Griffin 88'	Stadium: Sportpark 't Slot; Attendance: 2,500

22 July 2002 Dutch Tour	De Tubanters	0 – 9	Newcastle United	Enschede
			LuaLua 19'; Shearer 24', 29', 34'; Robert 48', 52' (pen.); Marcelino 60'; Bollen 62' (o.g.); Bassedas 75'	Attendance: 2,000

24 July 2002 Dutch Tour	GVVV Veenendaal	0 – 4	Newcastle United	Veenendaal
			Dyer 11'; Viana 24', 37'; Robert 43'	Attendance: 2,500

26 July 2002 Dutch Tour	UDI '19 Beter Bed	0 – 5	Newcastle United	Uden
			LuaLua 20', 28', 34'; Speed 21'; Shearer 38'	Attendance: 3,000

31 July 2002	Nottingham Forest	3 – 1	Newcastle United	Nottingham
	Johnson 16'; Lester 46'; Bopp 80'		Viana 26'	Stadium: City Ground; Attendance: 19,191; Referee: Anthony Bates

31 July 2002	Wolverhampton Wanderers	0 – 2	Newcastle United	Wolverhampton
			LuaLua 5', 68'	Stadium: Molineux; Attendance: 14,973; Referee: Fraser Stretton

7 August 2002	Newcastle United	0 – 3	Barcelona	Newcastle upon Tyne
			Kluivert 28'; Saviola 35'; Luis Enrique 50'	Stadium: St James' Park; Attendance: 51,257; Referee: Uriah Rennie

=== Premier League ===
19 August 2002	Newcastle United	4–0	West Ham United	Newcastle upon Tyne
20:00 BST	LuaLua 61', 72'; Shearer 76'; Solano 86'	Report		Stadium: St James' Park; Attendance: 51,072; Referee: Paul Durkin

24 August 2002	Manchester City	1–0	Newcastle United	Manchester
12:15 BST	Huckerby 36'	Report		Stadium: Maine Road; Attendance: 34,776; Referee: Uriah Rennie

2 September 2002	Liverpool	2–2	Newcastle United	Liverpool
20:00 BST	Hamann 54'; Owen 73' (pen.)	Report	Speed 80'; Shearer 88'	Stadium: Anfield; Attendance: 43,241; Referee: Graham Poll

11 September 2002	Newcastle United	0–2	Leeds United	Newcastle upon Tyne
20:00 BST		Report	Viduka 5'; Smith 87'	Stadium: St James' Park; Attendance: 51,730; Referee: Dermot Gallagher

14 September 2002	Chelsea	3–0	Newcastle United	London
15:00 BST	Guðjohnsen 14', 58'; Zola 26'	Report		Stadium: Stamford Bridge; Attendance: 39,746; Referee: Barry Knight

21 September 2002	Newcastle United	2–0	Sunderland	Newcastle upon Tyne
12:15 BST	Bellamy 2'; Shearer 39'	Report		Stadium: St James' Park; Attendance: 52,181; Referee: Mike Riley

28 September 2002	Birmingham City	0–2	Newcastle United	Birmingham
17:30		Report	Solano 34'; Ameobi 89'	Stadium: St Andrew's; Attendance: 29,072; Referee: Steve Bennett

5 October 2002	Newcastle United	2–1	West Bromwich Albion	Newcastle upon Tyne
15:00	Shearer 45', 69'	Report	Bališ 26'	Stadium: St James' Park; Attendance: 52,142; Referee: Chris Foy

19 October 2002	Blackburn Rovers	5–2	Newcastle United	Blackburn
15:00	Dunn 5' (pen.), 8'; Taylor 55', 74'; Griffin 65' (o.g.)	Report	Dabizas (red card) 4'; Shearer 36' (pen.), 48'	Stadium: Ewood Park; Attendance: 27,307; Referee: Alan Wiley

26 October 2002	Newcastle United	2–1	Charlton Athletic	Newcastle upon Tyne
15:00	Griffin 37'; Robert 59'	Report	Bartlett 30'	Stadium: St James' Park; Attendance: 51,670; Referee: Andy D'Urso

4 November 2002	Newcastle United	2–0	Middlesbrough	Newcastle upon Tyne
20:00	Ameobi 20'; S. Caldwell 87'	Report		Stadium: St James' Park; Attendance: 51,558; Referee: Graham Barber

9 November 2002	Arsenal	1–0	Newcastle United	London
15:00	Wiltord 24'	Report		Stadium: Highbury; Attendance: 38,121; Referee: Mike Dean

16 November 2002	Newcastle United	2–1	Southampton	Newcastle upon Tyne
15:00	Ameobi 41'; Hughes 54'	Report	Beattie 2'	Stadium: St James' Park; Attendance: 51,812; Referee: C. Wilkes

23 November 2002	Manchester United	5–3	Newcastle United	Manchester
12:15	Scholes 25'; Van Nistelrooy 38', 45', 53'; Solskjær 55'	Report	Bernard 35'; Shearer 52'; Bellamy 75'	Stadium: Old Trafford; Attendance: 67,619; Referee: Steve Dunn

1 December 2002	Newcastle United	2–1	Everton	Newcastle upon Tyne
14:15	Shearer 86'; Li Tie 89' (o.g.)	Report	Campbell 17'; Yobo (red card) 22'	Stadium: St James' Park; Attendance: 51,607; Referee: Mark Halsey

7 December 2002	Aston Villa	0–1	Newcastle United	Birmingham
15:00		Report	Shearer 82'	Stadium: Villa Park; Attendance: 33,446; Referee: Steve Bennett

14 December 2002	Southampton	1–1	Newcastle United	Southampton
15:00	Marsden 52'	Report	Bellamy 50'	Stadium: St Mary's Stadium; Attendance: 32,061; Referee: Phil Dowd

21 December 2002	Newcastle United	2–0	Fulham	Newcastle upon Tyne
15:00	Solano 8'; Bellamy 70'	Report	Womé (red card) 66'	Stadium: St James' Park; Attendance: 51,576; Referee: Alan Wiley

26 December 2002	Bolton Wanderers	4–3	Newcastle United	Bolton
13:00	Okocha 5'; Gardner 9'; Ricketts 45', 63'	Report	Shearer 8', 78'; Ameobi 72'	Stadium: Reebok Stadium; Attendance: 27,314; Referee: Uriah Rennie

29 December 2002	Newcastle United	2–1	Tottenham Hotspur	Newcastle upon Tyne
14:00	Speed 17'; Shearer 58'	Report	Dabizas 73' (o.g.)	Stadium: St James' Park; Attendance: 52,145; Referee: Steve Bennett

1 January 2003	Newcastle United	1–0	Liverpool	Newcastle upon Tyne
19:45	Robert 17'	Report	Diao (yellow card) 66' (red card)	Stadium: St James' Park; Attendance: 52,147; Referee: Dermot Gallagher

11 January 2003	West Ham United	2–2	Newcastle United	London
15:00	Cole 14'; Defoe 45'	Report	Bellamy 9'; Jenas 81'	Stadium: Boleyn Ground; Attendance: 35,048; Referee: Jeff Winter

18 January 2003	Newcastle United	2–0	Manchester City	Newcastle upon Tyne
15:00	Shearer 1'; Bellamy 64'	Report		Stadium: St James' Park; Attendance: 52,152; Referee: Graham Poll

22 January 2003	Newcastle United	1–0	Bolton Wanderers	Newcastle upon Tyne
19:45	Jenas 18'	Report		Stadium: St James' Park; Attendance: 52,005; Referee: Phil Dowd

29 January 2003	Tottenham Hotspur	0–1	Newcastle United	London
19:45		Report	Jenas 90'	Stadium: White Hart Lane; Attendance: 36,084; Referee: David Elleray

9 February 2003	Newcastle United	1–1	Arsenal	Newcastle upon Tyne
16:05	Robert 53', (red card) 58'	Report	Henry 35'	Stadium: St James' Park; Attendance: 52,157; Referee: Neale Barry

22 February 2003	Leeds United	0–3	Newcastle United	Leeds
15:00		Report	Dyer 17', 49'; Shearer 54'	Stadium: Elland Road; Attendance: 40,025; Referee: Alan Wiley

1 March 2003	Newcastle United	2–1	Chelsea	Newcastle upon Tyne
12:30	Hasselbaink 31' (o.g.); Bernard 53'	Report	Lampard 37'	Stadium: St James' Park; Attendance: 52,157; Referee: Jeff Winter

5 March 2003	Middlesbrough	1–0	Newcastle United	Middlesbrough
19:45	Geremi 62'	Report		Stadium: Riverside Stadium; Attendance: 34,814; Referee: Andy D'Urso

15 March 2003	Charlton Athletic	0–2	Newcastle United	London
15:00		Report	Shearer 33' (pen.); Solano 49'	Stadium: The Valley; Attendance: 26,728; Referee: Steve Dunn

22 March 2003	Newcastle United	5–1	Blackburn Rovers	Newcastle upon Tyne
15:00	Solano 24'; Robert 61'; Jenas 85'; Greško 89' (o.g.); Bellamy 90'	Report	Duff 54'	Stadium: St James' Park; Attendance: 52,106; Referee: Neale Barry

6 April 2003	Everton	2–1	Newcastle United	Liverpool
16:00	Rooney 18'; Unsworth 65' (pen.)	Report	Robert 61'	Stadium: Goodison Park; Attendance: 40,031; Referee: Neale Barry

12 April 2003	Newcastle United	2–6	Manchester United	Newcastle upon Tyne
12:30	Jenas 21'; Ameobi 86'	Report	Solskjær 32'; Scholes 34', 38', 52'; Giggs 44'; Van Nistelrooy 58' (pen.)	Stadium: St James' Park; Attendance: 52,164; Referee: Steve Dunn

19 April 2003	Fulham	2–1	Newcastle United	London
15:00	Lewinski 69'; Clark 86'	Report	Shearer 39'; Griffin (red card) 63'	Stadium: Loftus Road; Attendance: 17,900; Referee: Dermot Gallagher

21 April 2003	Newcastle United	1–1	Aston Villa	Newcastle upon Tyne
15:00	Solano 37'	Report	Dublin 69'	Stadium: St James' Park; Attendance: 52,015; Referee: Jeff Winter

26 April 2003	Sunderland	0–1	Newcastle United	Sunderland
15:00		Report	Solano 42' (pen.)	Stadium: Stadium of Light; Attendance: 45,067; Referee: Steve Bennett

3 May 2003	Newcastle United	1–0	Birmingham City	Newcastle upon Tyne
15:00	Viana 42'	Report	Upson (red card) 41'	Stadium: St James' Park; Attendance: 52,146; Referee: David Elleray

11 May 2003	West Bromwich Albion	2–2	Newcastle United	West Bromwich
15:00	Dobie 57', 72'	Report	Jenas 43'; Viana 80'	Stadium: The Hawthorns; Attendance: 27,036; Referee: Graham Barber

=== Champions League ===
14 August 2002 3rd qual rd. 1st leg	Željezničar	0–1	Newcastle United	Sarajevo, Bosnia and Herzegovina
19:45		Report	Dyer 56'	Stadium: Grbavica Stadium; Attendance: 35,000; Referee: Lubos Michel (Slovakia)

28 August 2002 3rd qual rd. 2nd leg	Newcastle United	4–0 (5 – 0 agg.)	Željezničar	Newcastle upon Tyne, England
19:45	Dyer 23'; LuaLua 37'; Viana 74'; Shearer 80'	Report	Jahić (red card) 69'	Stadium: St James' Park; Attendance: 34,067; Referee: Frank De Bleeckere (Belgium)

18 September 2002 Group E	Dynamo Kyiv	2–0	Newcastle United	Kyiv, Ukraine
19:45	Shatskikh 16'; Khatskevich 62'	Report		Stadium: Lobanovsky Dynamo Stadium; Attendance: 42,500; Referee: I. Gonzalez (Spain)

24 September 2002 Group E	Newcastle United	0–1	Feyenoord	Newcastle upon Tyne, England
19:45		Report	Pardo 4'	Stadium: St James' Park; Attendance: 40,540; Referee: Claude Colombo (France)

1 October 2002 Group E	Juventus	2–0	Newcastle United	Turin, Italy
19:45	Del Piero 66', 81'	Report		Stadium: Stadio delle Alpi; Attendance: 41,424; Referee: René Temmink (Netherlands)

23 October 2002 Group E	Newcastle United	1–0	Juventus	Newcastle upon Tyne, England
19:45	Griffin 62'	Report		Stadium: St James' Park; Attendance: 48,370; Referee: Rune Pedersen (Norway)

29 October 2002 Group E	Newcastle United	2–1	Dynamo Kyiv	Newcastle upon Tyne, England
19:45	Speed 58'; Shearer 69' (pen.)	Report	Shatskikh 47'	Stadium: St James' Park; Attendance: 40,185; Referee: J.A.F. Marin (Spain)

13 November 2002 Group E	Feyenoord	2–3	Newcastle United	Rotterdam, Netherlands
19:45	Bombarda 65'; Lurling 71'	Report	Bellamy 45', 90'; Viana 49'	Stadium: Feijenoord Stadion; Attendance: 45,000; Referee: Franz Wack (Germany)

27 November 2002 Group A	Newcastle United	1–4	Internazionale	Newcastle upon Tyne, England
19:45	Bellamy (red card) 6'; Solano 58'	Report	Morfeo 2'; Almeyda 35'; Crespo 45'; Recoba 81'	Stadium: St James' Park; Attendance: 50,108; Referee: Stephane Bre (France)

11 December 2002 Group A	Barcelona	3–1	Newcastle United	Barcelona, Spain
19:45	Dani 7'; Kluivert 39'; Motta 58'	Report	Ameobi 24'	Stadium: Camp Nou; Attendance: 45,100

18 February 2003 Group A	Bayer Leverkusen	1–3	Newcastle United	Leverkusen, Germany
19:45	França 25'	Report	Ameobi 5', 15'; LuaLua 32'	Stadium: BayArena; Referee: Terje Hauge (Norway)

26 February 2003 Group A	Newcastle United	3–1	Bayer Leverkusen	Newcastle upon Tyne, England
19:45	Shearer 5', 11', 36' (pen.)	Report	Babić 73'	Stadium: St James' Park; Attendance: 40,508; Referee: Claus Bo Larsen (Denmark)

11 March 2003 Group A	Internazionale	2–2	Newcastle United	Milan, Italy
19:45	Vieri 46'; Córdoba 60'	Report	Shearer 42', 49'	Stadium: San Siro; Referee: Lucílio Batista (Portugal)

19 March 2003 Group A	Newcastle United	0–2	Barcelona	Newcastle upon Tyne
19:45		Report	Kluivert 60'; Motta 74'	Stadium: St James' Park, England; Attendance: 51,883; Referee: Jan Wegereef (Netherlands)

=== FA Cup ===
5 January 2003 Round 3	Wolverhampton Wanderers	3 – 2	Newcastle United	Wolverhampton
16:00	Ince 6'; Kennedy 28'; Ndah 49'	(Report)	Jenas 40'; Shearer 43' (pen.)	Stadium: Molineux; Attendance: 27,316; Referee: Rob Styles

=== League Cup ===
6 November 2002 Round 3	Newcastle United	3 – 3 (a.e.t.) (2 – 3 p)	Everton	Newcastle upon Tyne
19:45	Dyer 77', 78'; Pistone 100' (o.g.)	Report	Campbell 11'; Watson 85'; Unsworth 112' (pen.)	Stadium: St James' Park; Attendance: 34,584; Referee: Mike Riley
	Penalties
	Dyer (penalty scored); Solano (penalty scored); Viana (penalty missed); Chopra (penalty missed); Robert (penalty missed)		(penalty missed) Unsworth; (penalty scored) Watson; (penalty scored) Rooney; (penalty scored) Campbell
