= 2003 FA Premier League Asia Cup =

Tournament details
- Host country: Malaysia
- Dates: 24 - 27 July
- Teams: 4 (from 2 confederations)
- Venue: 1 (in 1 host city)

Final positions
- Champions: (England) Chelsea (1st title)
- Runners-up: (England) Newcastle United
- Third place: (England) Birmingham City
- Fourth place: Malaysia

Tournament statistics
- Matches played: 4
- Goals scored: 12 (3 per match)
- Top scorer: (Trinidad and Tobago) Stern John (2 goals)

The 2003 FA Premier League Asia Cup was the first edition of the Premier League Asia Trophy, a four-team pre-season football tournament held every two years. Participants in the inaugural edition included hosts Malaysia and three Premier League teams: Chelsea, Newcastle United and Birmingham City. All games were held at the Bukit Jalil National Stadium in Kuala Lumpur.

The tournament began at the semi-final stage, with the winners advancing to the final and the losers playing off for third place. Chelsea became the inaugural winners of this tournament after defeating Newcastle United on penalties in the final.

== Results ==
Semi-finals
24 July 2003 – Kuala Lumpur (Bukit Jalil Stadium)
(England) Newcastle United	2
(England) Birmingham City	1
25 July 2003 - Kuala Lumpur (Bukit Jalil Stadium)
Malaysia	1
(England) Chelsea	4

Final
27 July 2003 – Kuala Lumpur (Bukit Jalil Stadium)
(England) Chelsea	0 (5)
(England) Newcastle United	0 (4)
Third place
26 July 2003 – Kuala Lumpur (Bukit Jalil Stadium)
Malaysia	0
(England) Birmingham City	4

=== Semi-finals ===
2003-07-24
20:45 MST
08:00 UTC

Newcastle United (England)	2 – 1	(England) Birmingham City
Shearer 36' (pen.); Ameobi 75'		Devlin 72' (pen.)

Bukit Jalil Stadium, Kuala Lumpur
Attendance: 14,600
Referee: Rob Styles

2003-07-25
20:45 MST
08:00 UTC

Malaysia	1 – 4	(England) Chelsea
Hairuddin 40'		Lampard 36'; Hasselbaink 70'; Guðjohnsen 83'; Johnson 85'

Bukit Jalil Stadium, Kuala Lumpur
Attendance: 21,000
Referee: Subkhiddin Mohd Salleh

=== Third place play-off ===
2003-07-26
20:45 MST
08:00 UTC

Malaysia	0 – 4	(England) Birmingham City
		John 8', 50'; Clemence 76'; Hughes 81'

Bukit Jalil Stadium, Kuala Lumpur
Attendance: 12,000
Referee: Rob Styles

=== Final ===
2003-07-27
20:45 MST
08:00 UTC

Chelsea (England)	0 – 0	(England) Newcastle United
Penalties
Lampard (penalty scored); Duff (penalty missed); Huth (penalty scored); Guðjohnsen (penalty scored); Hasselbaink (penalty missed); Keenan (penalty scored); Terry (penalty scored)	5 – 4	(penalty missed) Shearer; (penalty missed) Robert; (penalty scored) Dyer; (penalty scored) Bowyer; (penalty scored) Bellamy; (penalty scored) Woodgate; (penalty missed) Jenas

Bukit Jalil Stadium, Kuala Lumpur
Attendance: 41,500
Referee: Andy D'Urso

Chelsea	Newcastle United

== Goalscorers ==
2 goals

- (Trinidad and Tobago) Stern John

1 goal

- (England) Alan Shearer
- (Scotland) Paul Devlin
- (Nigeria) Shola Ameobi
- (England) Frank Lampard
- (Malaysia) Hairuddin Omar
- (Netherlands) (Suriname) Jimmy Floyd Hasselbaink
- (Iceland) Eiður Guðjohnsen
- (England) Glen Johnson
- (England) Stephen Clemence
- (England) Bryan Hughes
