= Andy Griffin =

English footballer (born 1979)

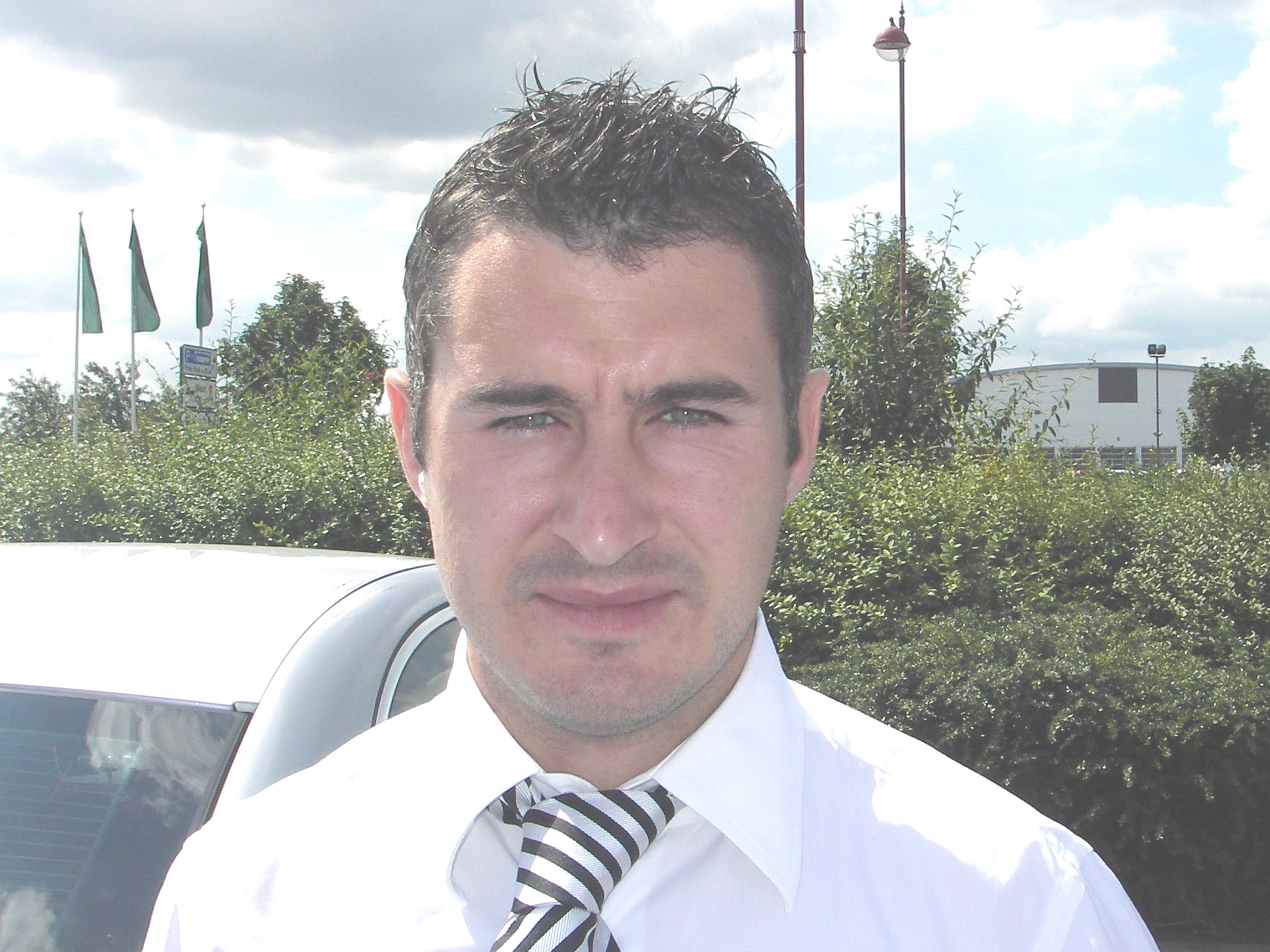
- Griffin in August 2007

Personal information
- Full name: Andrew Griffin
- Date of birth: 7 March 1979 (age 47)
- Place of birth: Higher End, Wigan, England
- Position: Right-back

Youth career
- 1994–1996: Stoke City

Senior career*
Years	Team	Apps	(Gls)
1996–1998	Stoke City	57	(2)
1998–2004	Newcastle United	76	(2)
2004–2007	Portsmouth	43	(0)
2006–2007	→ Stoke City (loan)	33	(2)
2007–2008	Derby County	15	(0)
2008–2010	Stoke City	35	(0)
2010	→ Reading (loan)	21	(0)
2010–2012	Reading	42	(0)
2012–2013	Doncaster Rovers	16	(0)
2014	Chester	4	(0)
Total		342	(6)

International career
1997–1998	England U18	6	(0)
1999–2001	England U21	3	(2)
- * Club domestic league appearances and goals

Andrew Griffin (born 7 March 1979) is an English former footballer who played as a right-back.

Griffin began his career at Stoke City, where he established a reputation as a solid wing-back defender. His impressive performances for the Potters led to him being signed by Newcastle United for a fee of £1.5million in January 1998. He spent six years on Tyneside, before moving south to Portsmouth in 2004. He was unable to establish himself as first-choice right-back at Pompey and re-joined his old club Stoke on loan for the 2006–07 season.

Stoke narrowly missed out on a play-off position and so Griffin decided to sign for newly promoted Derby County, however with Derby struggling to compete in the Premier League, he joined Stoke for a third time in January 2008. He helped Stoke to claim promotion and was made captain of the side for the 2008–09 season. Griffin lost his place in the side, after an on the pitch altercation with Ricardo Fuller at West Ham United in December 2008. He joined Reading in 2010, helping them gain promotion at the second attempt after failing in the play-offs. He was released by Reading in May 2012 and joined Doncaster Rovers in October 2012. He spent two years at Doncaster, before ending his career with a short spell at Chester.

== Club career ==
=== Stoke City ===
Griffin was born in Wigan, Greater Manchester, and began his career with Stoke City. He impressed in the club's youth ranks and he was handed a professional contract in July 1996. He instantly became a regular in the side during the 1996–97 season, playing in 36 matches including the final match at the Victoria Ground and in just his first season as a professional, he won the club's player of the year award. In 1997, Stoke moved to the Britannia Stadium, but the team struggled all season and with relegation looming, Stoke decided to cash in on their most promising prospect, selling Griffin to Newcastle United for £1.5million in January 1998.

=== Newcastle United ===
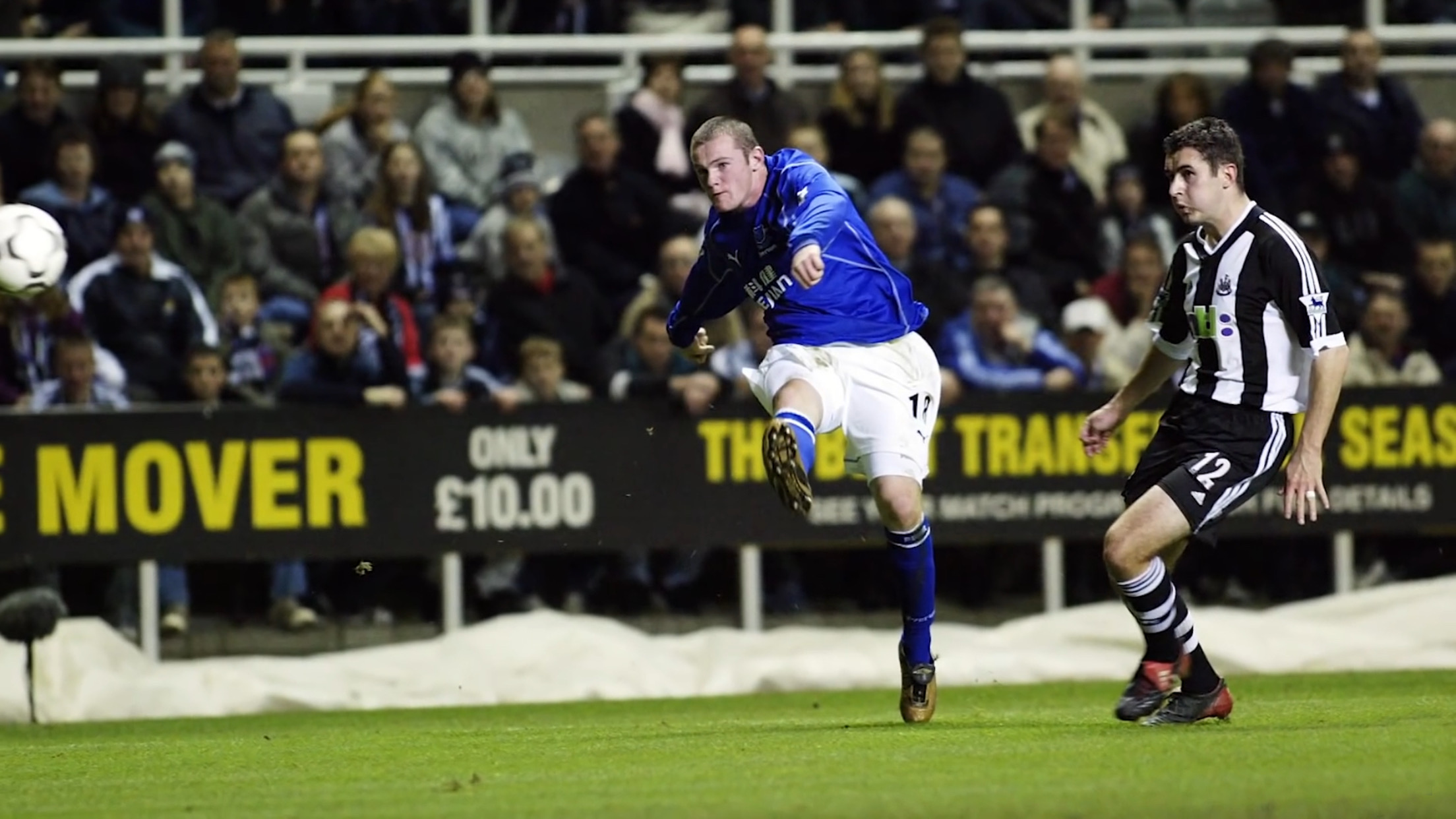
Griffin (right) defending against Everton's Wayne Rooney, November 2002

Griffin settled quickly in Newcastle and earned call-ups to the England U21 team and also played in the 1999 FA Cup final. However, he picked up an injury in August 1999, ruling him out for the 1999–2000 season. He made a comeback the following season, but he again suffered a hernia injury, missing another season. Griffin enjoyed something of a resurgence under Bobby Robson and made several solid performances during the 2002–03 season, including in the UEFA Champions League, when his winning goal against Juventus rekindled his side's campaign. Injuries and a failure to get a regular place in the side saw him not offered a new contract by Newcastle at the end of the 2003–04 season.

=== Portsmouth ===
Griffin joined Portsmouth in May 2004 on a free transfer. After agreeing to join the club, Griffin revealed that he took the advice of former Newcastle teammate Lomana LuaLua. His Pompey career got off to a bad start as he conceded an own goal on his debut in a 2–0 home defeat against Tottenham Hotspur. He played twenty-seven games in the 2004–05 season and twenty-one games in the 2005–06 season.

==== Return to Stoke City (loan) ====
By the summer of 2006, he dropped out of Harry Redknapp's plans and in September of that year he was loaned to former club Stoke City. He became first-choice right-back under Tony Pulis as was a number of loan signings for Stoke in the 2006–07 season, which helped turn around the club's fortunes. He scored two goals for Stoke, firstly against Leeds United in a 4–0 victory, and then a "sensational 30-yard strike" against Coventry City. After the match, Pulis spoke of his delight at Griffin's goal and performance. "It was an absolutely fantastic goal. It was top drawer. He came through the ranks at Stoke as a kid and that will mean a lot to him. It will have been lovely for him to score because he's got family here. We're delighted that Portsmouth have allowed us to have him on loan." He played thirty-four matches for Stoke in the 2006–07 season, as Stoke narrowly missed out on a play-off place and Pulis confirmed that he would like to sign Griffin permanently.

=== Derby County ===
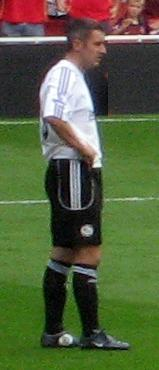
Griffin playing for Derby County in September 2007

On 31 July 2007, Griffin signed for Premier League side Derby County on a three-year deal. He was initially Derby's first-choice right-back, but when Tyrone Mears returned from injury and Paul Jewell replaced Billy Davies as Derby manager, he found his chances in the first team restricted. Griffin was given permission to talk to Stoke City.

=== Second return to Stoke City ===
On 11 January 2008, Griffin moved back to Stoke City for a fee of £300,000, signing a 4 1/2-year contract. In January 2008, Stoke sold captain John Eustace to Watford. This move saw Griffin named Stoke's new captain despite only being back at the club for three weeks, nonetheless Griffin was delighted describing it as a "proud moment in my career." On 2 March 2008, he was controversially sent off against Queens Park Rangers, as Stoke fell to a 3–0 defeat. Stoke were successful in their appeal. In a match against Watford, former teammate Eustace was sent off and Griffin branded the referee's decision as "pathetic". Griffin missed the final two matches of Stoke's promotion winning 2007–08 season, due to a torn hamstring. After the season ended, Griffin admitted he made the wrong decision to join Derby rather than Stoke in the summer of 2007.

Griffin began the 2008–09 season as first-choice right-back, until he was involved in an on pitch altercation with striker Ricardo Fuller away at West Ham United on 28 December 2008, which saw Fuller sent off. Afterwards, the pair publicly apologised for the incident. However, Griffin lost his place in the side and Abdoulaye Faye took over as captain for the remainder of the season. He found himself out of the first team in the 2009–10 season, but he did manage to score a dramatic 96th-minute winner in a 4–3 victory over Blackpool in the League Cup.

=== Reading ===
On 11 January 2010, he joined Reading on loan for the remainder of the season. He was instrumental in solidifying Reading's back line in the second half of the 2009–10 season, which saw Reading rise from the relegation zone at the beginning of January to ninth place by the end of the season. Griffin signed on a permanent two-year deal on 1 July 2010 for an undisclosed fee. On 2 May 2012, after Reading had won promotion to the Premier League and with Griffin having made only nine league appearances in the 2011–12 season, the club announced it would not be renewing Griffin's contract.

=== Later career ===
On 22 October 2012, Griffin joined Doncaster Rovers on a non-contract basis. He played eighteen matches for Doncaster in the 2012–13 season, as the side won promotion to the Championship. He was informed by manager Paul Dickov that he would not be getting a new contract with the club but allowed him to play with the reserves until he finds a new club. Griffin joined Conference Premier side Chester on 27 March 2014. He made just four appearances for Chester, before he decided to retire from playing. After leaving Chester in the summer of 2014, Griffin became a coach at Newcastle-under-Lyme College.

== Career statistics ==
Appearances and goals by club, season and competition
Club	Season	League			FA Cup		League Cup		Europe		Other		Total	
Club	Season	Division	Apps	Goals	Apps	Goals	Apps	Goals	Apps	Goals	Apps	Goals	Apps	Goals
Stoke City	1996–97	First Division	34	1	1	0	1	0	—		—		36	1
Stoke City	1997–98	First Division	23	1	1	0	4	0	—		—		28	1
Stoke City	Total		57	2	2	0	5	0	—		—		64	2
Newcastle United	1997–98	Premier League	4	0	—		—		0	0	—		4	0
Newcastle United	1998–99	Premier League	14	0	3	0	1	0	1	0	—		19	0
Newcastle United	1999–2000	Premier League	3	1	0	0	0	0	0	0	—		3	1
Newcastle United	2000–01	Premier League	19	0	2	0	4	0	—		—		25	0
Newcastle United	2001–02	Premier League	4	0	0	0	1	0	—		—		5	0
Newcastle United	2002–03	Premier League	27	1	1	0	1	0	11	1	—		40	2
Newcastle United	2003–04	Premier League	5	0	0	0	1	0	2	0	—		8	0
Newcastle United	Total		76	2	6	0	8	0	14	1	—		104	3
Portsmouth	2004–05	Premier League	22	0	1	0	4	0	—		—		27	0
Portsmouth	2005–06	Premier League	21	0	0	0	0	0	—		—		21	0
Portsmouth	2006–07	Premier League	0	0	—		0	0	—		—		0	0
Portsmouth	Total		43	0	1	0	4	0	—		—		48	0
Stoke City (loan)	2006–07	Championship	33	2	1	0	0	0	—		—		34	2
Derby County	2007–08	Premier League	15	0	0	0	0	0	—		—		15	0
Stoke City	2007–08	Championship	15	0	0	0	0	0	—		—		15	0
Stoke City	2008–09	Premier League	20	0	0	0	1	0	—		—		21	0
Stoke City	2009–10	Premier League	0	0	0	0	3	1	—		—		3	1
Stoke City	Total		35	0	0	0	4	1	—		—		39	1
Reading	2009–10	Championship	21	0	4	0	—		—		—		25	0
Reading	2010–11	Championship	33	0	1	0	1	0	—		3 (Note: Appearances in Championship play-offs)	0	38	0
Reading	2011–12	Championship	9	0	0	0	1	0	—		—		9	0
Reading	Total		63	0	5	0	1	0	—		3	0	72	0
Doncaster Rovers	2012–13	League One	16	0	1	0	0	0	—		1 (Note: Appearances in Football League Trophy)	0	18	0
Chester	2013–14	Conference Premier	4	0	0	0	—		—		0	0	4	0
Career total			342	6	16	0	22	1	14	1	4	0	398	8

== Honours ==
Newcastle United

- FA Cup runner-up: 1998–99

Stoke City

- Football League Championship second-place promotion: 2007–08

Reading

- Football League Championship: 2011–12

Doncaster Rovers

- Football League One: 2012–13

Individual

- Stoke City Player of the Year: 1996–97
