= Olivier Bernard =

French footballer (born 1979)

Personal information
- Full name: Olivier Jimmy Wilfred Bernard
- Date of birth: 14 October 1979 (age 47)
- Place of birth: Paris, France
- Height: 1.75 m (5 ft 9 in)
- Position: Left-back

Senior career*
Years	Team	Apps	(Gls)
1998–2000	Lyon	0	(0)
2000–2005	Newcastle United	102	(6)
2001	→ Darlington (loan)	10	(2)
2005	Southampton	13	(0)
2005–2006	Rangers	9	(0)
2006–2007	Newcastle United	0	(0)
Total		134	(8)
- * Club domestic league appearances and goals

Olivier Jimmy Wilfred Bernard (born 14 October 1979) is a French former professional footballer as a left-back. He is the owner and CEO of Durham City.

== Early life ==
Olivier Jimmy Wilfred Bernard was born on 14 October 1979 in the 12th arrondissement of Paris, and grew up in the south-east of the city. Both of his parents were born in Guadeloupe.

He began to be involved with local gangs from the age of 9, and credits football with turning him away from a life of crime.

== Club career ==
=== Lyon ===
Bernard joined the Lyon academy at the age of 13, after being spotted while representing Seine-et-Marne in a youth cup final. He rejected a professional contract from Lyon, despite being required to under the French Professional Football Charter. He was initially required to pay compensation to the French club, but this was overturned by an eventual ruling of the European Court of Justice ten years later. This resulted in changes to the French youth transfer system.

=== Newcastle United ===
Bernard joined on a free transfer from Lyon in late-August 2000. He had an evolving career with the Magpies between 2000 and 2005, even though he was at Darlington on loan in the 2000–01 season. He formed a strong left-flank partnership with fellow Frenchman Laurent Robert, being a part of Bobby Robson's side, which finished fourth, third and fifth as well as reaching the last 16 of the Champions League and the semi-finals of the UEFA Cup. He was a regular starter at the beginning of the 2004–05 season, but Robson was sacked on 28 August 2004 and replaced by Graeme Souness, who made drastic changes at the club, cutting star players like Craig Bellamy and Laurent Robert.

=== Southampton ===
After a dispute over contract negotiations, Bernard left Newcastle on 31 January 2005 to join Southampton on a five-month contract.

When Southampton were relegated to the Championship in 2005, Bernard's contract expired and was not renewed by the club.

=== Rangers ===
After leaving Southampton, Bernard signed a two-year deal with Rangers on 1 September 2005, after turning down potential moves back to the Premier League with Birmingham City and Bolton Wanderers. He cited the prospect of playing in the Champions League once again as a driving force for his move.

After just one season with Rangers, and only nine league appearances, he was released after being made surplus to requirements by new manager Paul Le Guen.

=== Return to Newcastle United ===
Newcastle fans had mixed opinions when Bernard re-signed for them on 1 September 2006 after reneging on an agreement to join Leeds United.

However, his second spell on Tyneside did not turn out as well as hoped, with Bernard struggling for fitness and a series of niggling injuries preventing him from making his second debut for Newcastle. The latest injury was reported to be a hip injury. He made numerous reserve team outings, and was an unused substitute in some UEFA Cup fixtures, including away to Palermo and Levadia Tallinn. He never made an appearance for Newcastle during his injury hampered spell. As a result of this, on 16 May 2007 it was announced that, following the appointment of Sam Allardyce as Newcastle boss Bernard, along with Titus Bramble, Oguchi Onyewu, Craig Moore, and Pavel Srníček would not be playing for the side the following season having been released from their contracts.

He trained with Toronto FC to keep his fitness up in June 2008, mainly because he is friends with former Toronto midfielder Laurent Robert.

== Retirement ==
Bernard retired from football due to a hip injury. In a 2011 interview, he criticised manager Graeme Souness's man management and blamed him for the death of his career. Bernard's injury will require an operation eventually, but he is prolonging it despite the pain. He may never be able to run or have full mobility again- living with a limp for the rest of his life is almost a certainty. He now fights racism in football as a prominent member of Show Racism the Red Card and has appeared on Sky Sports News expressing his views on the 'Suarez/Evra dispute', stating his displeasure at the consequent actions of the Liverpool players. He now runs The Mason Arms in Blyth.

== Durham City ownership ==
In December 2013, it was announced that Bernard had purchased non-league Durham City and become owner and chairman of the club. On buying the club, Bernard stated: "I want to make Durham one of the best feeder clubs in the north east. At the moment, I don't think the area develops enough youngsters. I want to raise the profile of the club and get links with Sunderland, Newcastle and Middlesbrough. Look at the England team, how many of them are from around here? I'll do everything I can to get players to Durham and help develop them".

== Honours ==
Individual

- Newcastle United Player of the Year: 2003–04
