= Shola Ameobi =

Nigerian footballer (born 1981)

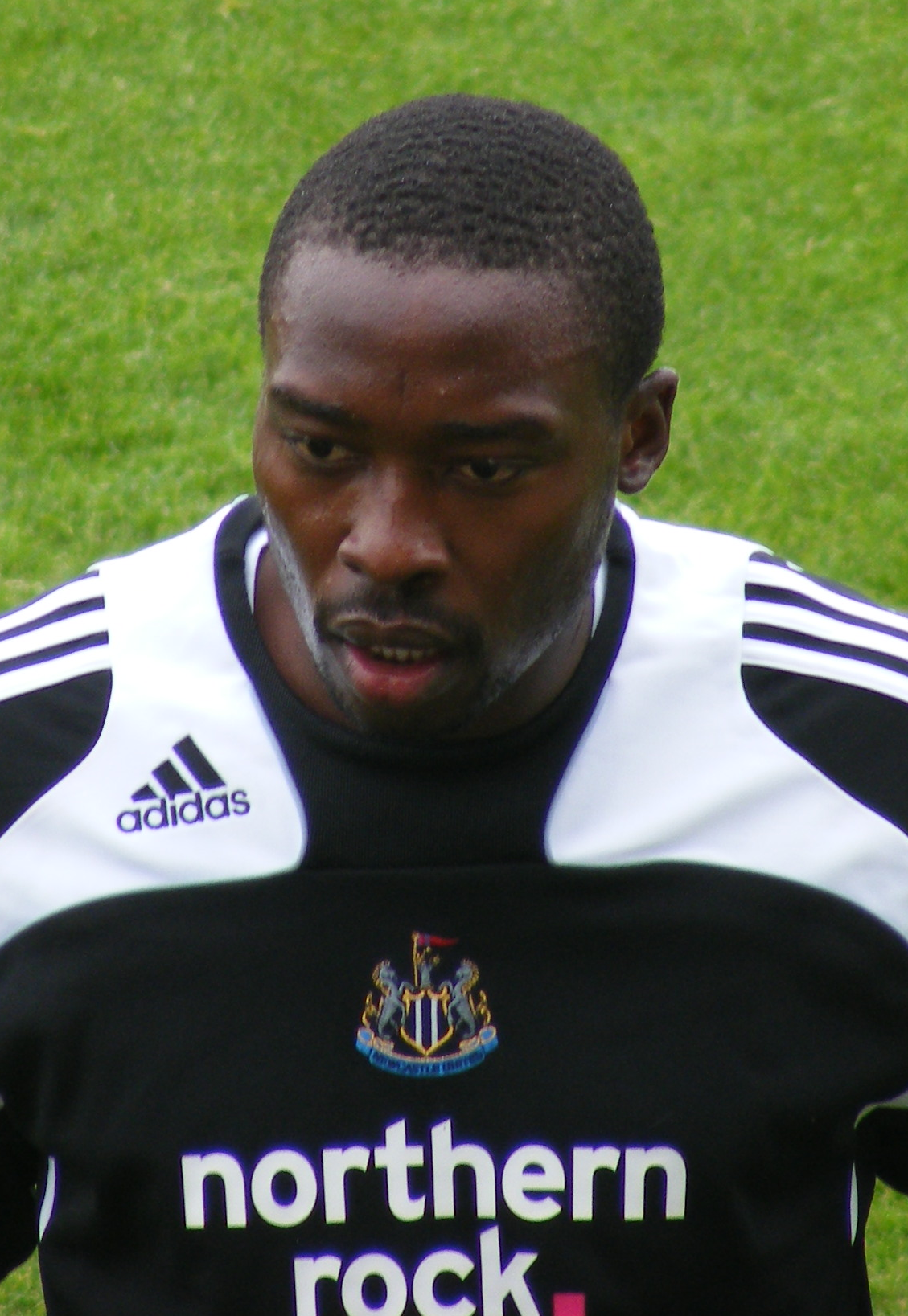
- Ameobi warming up for Newcastle United in 2008

Personal information
- Full name: Foluwashola Ameobi
- Date of birth: 12 October 1981 (age 45)
- Place of birth: Zaria, Nigeria
- Height: 1.91 m (6 ft 3 in)
- Position: Striker

Youth career
- 1995–2000: Newcastle United

Senior career*
Years	Team	Apps	(Gls)
2000–2014	Newcastle United	312	(53)
2008	→ Stoke City (loan)	6	(0)
2014–2015	Gaziantep BB	11	(4)
2015	Crystal Palace	4	(0)
2015–2016	Bolton Wanderers	8	(2)
2016–2017	Fleetwood Town	10	(1)
2017–2018	Notts County	51	(10)
Total		402	(70)

International career
2000–2003	England U21	20	(7)
2012–2014	Nigeria	10	(2)
- * Club domestic league appearances and goals

Foluwashola "Shola" Ameobi (born 12 October 1981) is a Nigerian former professional footballer who played as a striker.

He spent 14 years at Newcastle United, making 397 official appearances and scoring 79 goals, and received a winner's medal when they won the Championship in 2010. He has the fifth most appearances as a substitute in the Premier League. On leaving Newcastle in 2014, he briefly represented Gaziantep BB in Turkey, before brief spells at Crystal Palace, Bolton Wanderers, Fleetwood Town, and Notts County.

Born in Nigeria but raised in England, Ameobi was capped by the England under-21 team before making his Nigeria debut in 2012 and representing them at the 2014 FIFA World Cup.

== Early life ==
Born in Zaria, Nigeria to a family from Ijumu Local Government Area in modern-day Kogi State. Ameobi moved to Fenham, Newcastle upon Tyne, England when he was five. His initial promise was spotted whilst attending the Walker Central Boys Club, before he was invited to attend Newcastle United's Academy.

== Club career ==
=== Newcastle United ===
==== Early career ====
Ameobi signed a pre-contract with Newcastle on 1 July 1997. He progressed through the youth setup, making his debut in the reserves in 1998 on 11 October against Sunderland. He made his first team debut two years later, on 9 September 2000, in a home game against Chelsea. He went on to make 22 appearances for Newcastle that season, in lieu of the injured Alan Shearer and Carl Cort.

The 2002–03 Champions League saw some of Ameobi's finest performances including an equalising goal against Barcelona in a 3–1 defeat at the Nou Camp as well as scoring two goals against Bayer Leverkusen in a 3–1 victory.

His erratic form has earned him some criticism in the past, and although never having been claimed as a prolific goalscorer, many of his games were as a substitute. Due to injuries in the latter stages of the 2005–06 season, Ameobi gained a regular starting place, and scored six goals in Newcastle's last 12 Premier League games.

In the 2006 UEFA Intertoto Cup, Ameobi scored twice in Newcastle's away tie at Lillestrøm SK (3–0), taking him to second place in the club's table of leading goalscorers in European competition with twelve goals, behind only Shearer.

==== Injury, loan, and transfer attempts ====
During the 2006–07 season, Ameobi needed a hip operation, a problem which had been plaguing him for two seasons. Newcastle's shortage of match-fit first team strikers during the previous season had forced him to postpone this surgery. The injury eventually forced Newcastle United manager Glenn Roeder to send Ameobi for surgery in January 2007 after a prolonged hip problem failed to improve with rest. The operation ruled him out for the remainder of the 2006–07 season. He had made 13 appearances (three as a substitute) and scored five goals.

Ameobi and the Newcastle medical team reported his hip operation in the United States was a success and that the club doctors and medical staff would work on his rehabilitation. It was originally thought that he would not be fit to play until the start of the 2007–08 season, but his rehabilitation progressed quickly and he returned with three games remaining in the season, clocking approximately 30 minutes of match action against Reading and making a further two appearances.

However, after failing to impress Newcastle manager Sam Allardyce, or Kevin Keegan on 27 March 2008, Ameobi agreed a loan deal with Stoke City until the end of the season, to help their promotion campaign. It is understood that a loan fee of around £500K was agreed and that a possible permanent transfer was also discussed subject to Stoke winning promotion. Ameobi made his debut for Stoke against Sheffield Wednesday on 29 March, the game ended 1–1. After playing for six games and not managing to score despite Stoke's gaining of promotion, Ameobi returned to Newcastle, and Stoke decided not to sign him permanently.

On 14 August, Ipswich Town manager Jim Magilton confirmed that the club were in talks with Ameobi and that the club were keen to get the deal finalised as long as Ameobi was willing to play in the Championship. However, on 17 August, Ameobi failed a medical, showing hamstring problems, and the deal collapsed.

==== Return to fitness ====
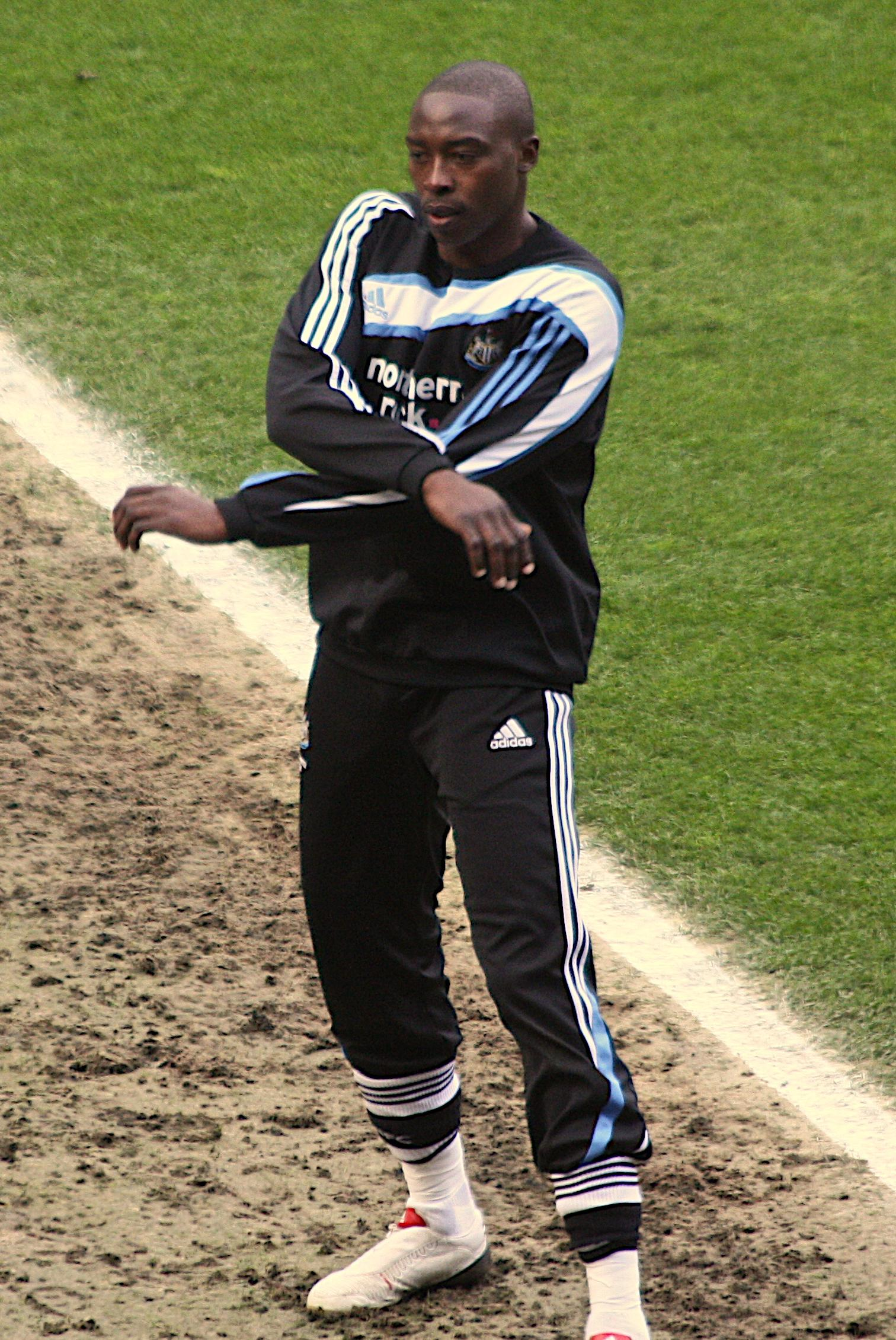
Ameobi warming up on the sidelines against Ipswich Town in 2010.

Due to long-term injuries to Mark Viduka and Alan Smith, as well as shorter term injuries to Michael Owen and Obafemi Martins, Ameobi was able to start the 2008–09 season in the first team squad. He managed to score his first goal in two years for Newcastle in a 2–2 home draw with Manchester City on 20 October. After the match, interim manager Joe Kinnear praised Ameobi and backed him to kick-start his career. He followed this up with a goal in his next game away to Sunderland in a 2–1 defeat on 25 October. He signed a new deal with the club in January 2009 to keep him contracted until 2012.

He scored a penalty to mark his 50th goal for Newcastle on 1 February 2009 against local rivals Sunderland to make the final score 1–1. He scored his first ever career hat-trick in Newcastle's first home match in the Championship against Reading on 15 August. The first two goals were diving headers, and he completed his hat-trick with a penalty, which he placed in the bottom left corner, sending the keeper the wrong way. He scored in the next game in a 1–0 victory over Sheffield Wednesday taking his tally to four goals in three games, equalling his total for the previous season. Following these early season performances he was named the Championship player of the month for August.

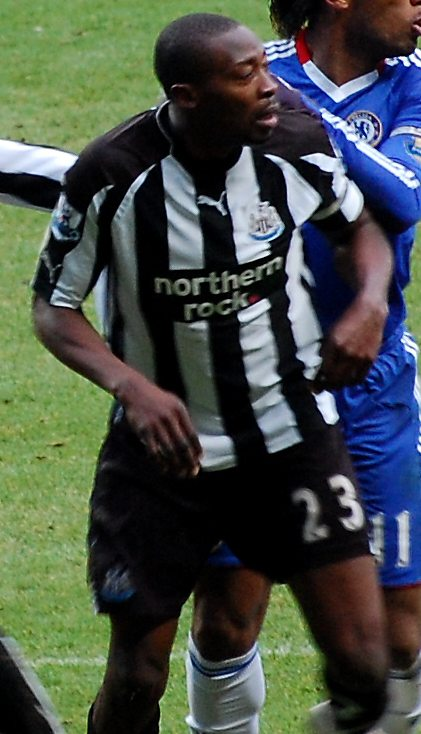
Ameobi playing against Chelsea in November 2010.

He got injured in Newcastle's 4–3 win over Huddersfield Town in the League Cup. The injury kept him out for three months but on his return he scored against Coventry with a left footed strike from the edge of the box. He followed this up by scoring the second in Newcastle's 2–0 home win over Middlesbrough and their 2–2 away draw with Sheffield Wednesday on Boxing Day taking his tally to an impressive 8 goals from 9 starts. Ameobi was subsequently sidelined with a hamstring injury but made the bench against Nottingham Forest on 29 March 2010. Ameobi appeared early in the second half as a substitute, and soon made his presence felt, firing in an angled left-footed shot off the post to give United the lead in a 2–0 victory. On 3 April 2010, Ameobi scored the decisive goal in a 3–2 victory at Peterborough United.

On 22 September 2010 Ameobi scored two goals in a surprise victory away at Chelsea in the League Cup, including the winner in the 90th minute. On 16 October 2010, Ameobi came off the bench to score Newcastle's first in a 2–2 draw against Wigan Athletic. After his good performance against Wigan, he started the next game against West Ham United alongside Andy Carroll putting in a good performance as The Magpies came from 1–0 down to win 2–1. He scored twice in Newcastle's next league game on 31 October 2010 as Newcastle crushed local rivals Sunderland 5–1 at St. James' Park. On 2 January 2011, he scored the winner in a 1–0 win at Wigan Athletic.

Despite suffering with a cheek bone injury in February which required him to wear a mask which impaired his vision upon his return, he was a regular starter after Christmas with the sale of Andy Carroll. He signed a contract extension to the end of the 2013–14 season on 10 August 2011. His current deal was due to expire at the end of the season.

==== Later career ====
In the 2011–12 season, Ameobi became something of a fringe player, with the arrival of Demba Ba and later, Papiss Cissé, pushing him onto the substitutes bench. But on Sunday 16 October 2011, against Tottenham, Ameobi, a 71st-minute substitute for Leon Best, scored a goal late on to make it 2–2. The next few games were an annoyance for Ameobi, with Ba finding his shooting boots and pairing well with Best and with Ameobi's inclusion in the starting line-up against Norwich ending up in a 4–2 defeat. On 4 March, Ameobi was yet again on the bench for a game against Sunderland, and brought on as a substitute for Cissé he scored a 91st-minute equaliser to get Newcastle back on terms and bringing his tally to 7 goals in 12 games against Sunderland for Newcastle, a record only bettered by Jackie Milburn. His prolific goal scoring form against Sunderland has led many sections of the Newcastle support to refer to him as "The Mackem Slayer". His next league goal came nine months later, in a 1–0 win over QPR on 22 December.

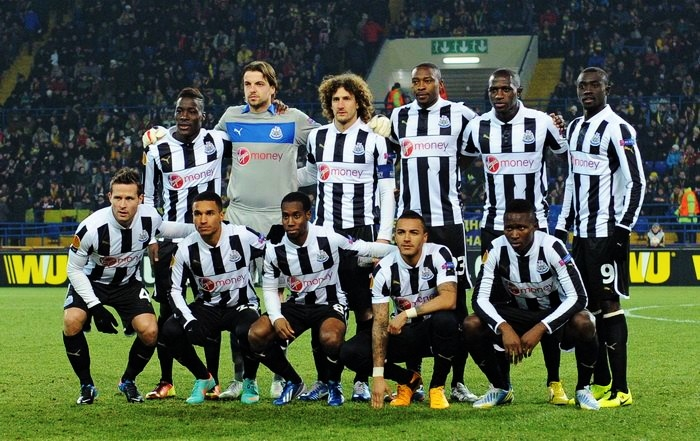
Ameobi (back; third from right) in Magpies colours, facing Metalist Kharkiv in the Europa League in 2013.

During Newcastle's Europa League campaign, Ameobi scored three goals in the competition; the opening goal in a 3–0 win over Bordeaux on 4 October 2012; the equaliser in a 2–2 draw with Club Brugge on 8 November 2012, and the only goal of the game from the penalty spot to secure a 1–0 aggregate victory over Metalist Kharkiv on 21 February 2013.

Ameobi scored in a 2–0 win over Morecambe in the second round in the League Cup (with his younger brother scoring the second goal) on 28 August 2013. Ameobi's next goal would come in the league when he scored the opening goal in a 2–1 home loss to Swansea City on 19 April 2014, and he also scored the opening goal in a 3–0 win over Cardiff City. On the final day of the season and also, his final appearance for Newcastle, Ameobi was sent off for dissent in a 2–1 away loss to Liverpool.

On 23 May 2014, it was confirmed by Newcastle United that they would be parting company with Ameobi after 14 years of service for the Tyneside club.

=== Gaziantep BB ===
On 11 August 2014, Ameobi signed for Turkish club Gaziantep Büyükşehir Belediyespor on a one-year contract. He made his debut on 13 September, in a goalless draw against Kayserispor, playing the full match and getting booked in the third minute. He scored his first goal through a 35th-minute penalty in the 1–1 draw with Adanaspor on 19 September.

Ameobi left the club on 29 December 2014, citing family reasons for his departure. He made 11 appearances and scored 4 goals during his time there.

=== Crystal Palace ===
On 29 January 2015, Ameobi returned to the Premier League by signing for Crystal Palace until the end of the season. He was signed by Alan Pardew, his last manager at Newcastle. On 21 February 2015, he made his debut for the club after being substituted on for Joe Ledley in the eightieth minute against Arsenal.

In June 2015, Ameobi was released by Crystal Palace on expiry of his contract.

=== Bolton Wanderers ===
On 23 October 2015, Ameobi signed for Championship side Bolton Wanderers on a short-term contract and was handed the number 26 shirt. He made his debut a day later coming on as a 12th-minute substitute replacing Gary Madine in a 1–1 draw against Leeds United, in which Ameobi gave Bolton the lead in the 32nd minute. He left the club after his contract ended following Bolton's 3–1 victory over MK Dons in which he scored in the 90th minute on 23 January 2016. Following the end of this contract, Ameobi offered to play for Bolton for free but Bolton were unable to do this, due to being under a transfer embargo.

=== Fleetwood Town ===
On 12 February 2016, Ameobi signed for Fleetwood Town until the end of the season, and was handed the number 9 shirt.

=== Notts County ===
On 3 February 2017, Ameobi signed for Notts County until 30 June 2017. On 20 June 2017, Ameobi signed a new contract with the club.

He was released by Notts County at the end of the 2017–18 season.

== Return to Newcastle United and new role ==
Ameobi returned to Newcastle United on 22 June 2019 as the club's first ever loan manager.

== Personal life ==
He is the older brother of fellow footballers Tomi and Sammy. His father, Dr John Ameobi, is a pastor in Newcastle Apostolic church, a Pentecostal church. All of the Ameobi boys were brought up in the church and have a strong faith. Ameobi is on the board of reference for CSW, an organisation working for religious freedom through advocacy and human rights.

== International career ==
Nigerian-born Ameobi had a three-year spell with England's under-21 team, netting seven goals between 2000 and 2003. Ameobi is the joint eighth highest goal scorer for the under-21s.

In late 2009, Ameobi declared his interest in playing for Nigeria. On 14 January 2011, he was announced in the Nigerian national squad for the first time, for a friendly against Guatemala in the United States, in February. He withdrew from the replacement game against Sierra Leone after breaking his cheekbone in a Premier League match.

On 1 November 2011, it was announced that FIFA had cleared Ameobi to play for Nigeria.

In October 2012, Nigeria head coach Stephen Keshi expressed his interest in Ameobi joining the squad for the 2013 Africa Cup of Nations.

In November 2012, Ameobi received his second call-up for the Nigeria national team against Venezuela. He made his debut on 14 November, appearing as a substitute in the 60th minute for former Newcastle teammate Obafemi Martins. In stoppage time at the end of the game, Ameobi laid on a pass for Ogenyi Onazi to make the score 3–1 to Nigeria.

He scored his first international goal for Nigeria on 10 September 2013, against Burkina Faso in a friendly in Kaduna, Nigeria. In November 2013, he scored his second goal against Italy, in a friendly at Craven Cottage.

On 12 May 2014, he was named in Nigeria's 30-man provisional squad for the 2014 FIFA World Cup, and later made the final 23-man squad. During the tournament, Ameobi made a total of two substitute appearances for the Super Eagles, failing to score in either and ultimately seeing out his side's 2–0 exit to France as an unused substitute.

== Career statistics ==
=== Club ===
Scource:

Appearances and goals by club, season and competition
Club	Season	League			National Cup (Note: England – FA Cup; Turkey – Turkish Cup)		League Cup (Note: England – League Cup)		Europe		Total	
Club	Season	Division	Apps	Goals	Apps	Goals	Apps	Goals	Apps	Goals	Apps	Goals
Newcastle United	2000–01	Premier League	20	2	2	0	0	0	—		22	2
Newcastle United	2001–02	Premier League	15	0	1	0	3	2	6 (Note: Appearances in the UEFA Intertoto Cup.)	3	25	5
Newcastle United	2002–03	Premier League	28	5	1	0	0	0	10 (Note: Appearances in the UEFA Champions League.)	3	39	8
Newcastle United	2003–04	Premier League	26	7	1	0	1	0	13 (Note: Two appearances in the UEFA Champions League; Eleven appearances, three goals in the UEFA Cup.)	3	41	10
Newcastle United	2004–05	Premier League	31	2	5	3	2	1	7 (Note: Appearances in the UEFA Cup.)	1	45	7
Newcastle United	2005–06	Premier League	30	9	3	0	0	0	1	0	34	9
Newcastle United	2006–07	Premier League	12	3	0	0	0	0	4 (Note: Two appearances, two goals in the UEFA Intertoto Cup; Two appearances in the UEFA Cup.)	2	16	5
Newcastle United	2007–08	Premier League	6	0	0	0	2	0	—		8	0
Newcastle United	2008–09	Premier League	22	4	0	0	0	0	—		22	4
Newcastle United	2009–10	Championship	18	10	2	0	1	1	—		21	11
Newcastle United	2010–11	Premier League	28	6	0	0	2	3	—		30	9
Newcastle United	2011–12	Premier League	27	2	2	0	1	0	—		30	2
Newcastle United	2012–13	Premier League	23	1	1	0	1	0	10 (Note: Appearances in the UEFA Europa League.)	3	35	4
Newcastle United	2013–14	Premier League	26	2	1	0	2	1	—		29	3
Newcastle United	Total		312	53	19	3	15	8	51	15	397	79
Stoke City (loan)	2007–08	Championship	6	0	0	0	0	0	—		6	0
Gaziantep BB	2014–15	TFF First League	11	4	0	0	—		—		11	4
Crystal Palace	2014–15	Premier League	4	0	0	0	0	0	—		4	0
Bolton Wanderers	2015–16	Championship	8	2	2	0	0	0	—		10	2
Fleetwood Town	2015–16	League One	10	1	0	0	0	0	—		10	1
Notts County	2016–17	League Two	17	4	0	0	0	0	—		17	4
Notts County	2017–18	League Two	34	6	2	0	0	0	—		36	6
Notts County	Total		51	10	2	0	0	0	0	0	53	10
Career total			402	70	23	3	15	8	51	15	491	96

=== International ===
As of 10 August 2014.

Nigeria
Year	Apps	Goals
2012	1	0
2013	4	2
2014	5	0
Total	10	2

== Honours ==
Newcastle United

- Football League Championship: 2009–10
- UEFA Intertoto Cup: 2006

Stoke City

- Football League Championship runner-up: 2007–08

Individual

- 'Wor Jackie' Award: 2000–01
