= Jermaine Jenas =

English footballer (born 1983)

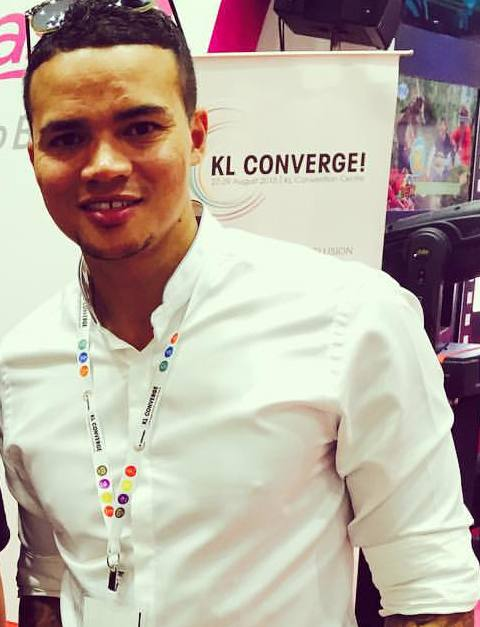
- Jenas in 2015

Personal information
- Full name: Jermaine Anthony Jenas
- Date of birth: 18 February 1983 (age 43)
- Place of birth: Nottingham, England
- Height: 5 ft 11 in (1.80 m)
- Position: Midfielder

Youth career
- 1999–2001: Nottingham Forest

Senior career*
Years	Team	Apps	(Gls)
2001–2002	Nottingham Forest	29	(4)
2002–2005	Newcastle United	110	(9)
2005–2013	Tottenham Hotspur	155	(21)
2011	→ Aston Villa (loan)	3	(0)
2012–2013	→ Nottingham Forest (loan)	6	(1)
2013–2014	Queens Park Rangers	38	(4)
Total		341	(39)

International career
1999	England U16	3	(0)
2000	England U17	1	(0)
2001	England U18	2	(0)
2001–2002	England U19	5	(0)
2002–2003	England U21	9	(0)
2006	England B	2	(1)
2003–2009	England	21	(1)
- * Club domestic league appearances and goals

Jermaine Anthony Jenas (/ˈdʒiːnəs/ JEE-nəs; born 18 February 1983) is an English television presenter, football commentator and former professional footballer. He played as a central midfielder for English club sides Nottingham Forest, Newcastle United, Tottenham Hotspur, Aston Villa, and Queens Park Rangers, scoring a career total of 39 goals from 341 league appearances. He also appeared 21 times for the senior England national football team, scoring one goal.

Jenas made his professional debut at age 17 for his boyhood club Nottingham Forest who were playing in the second tier, before moving to Premier League club Newcastle United for £5 million just over a year later, where he earned his first senior England cap in February 2003 aged 19 and was named PFA Young Player of the Year for the 2002–03 season. Hampered by several serious injuries, Jenas failed to reach the career heights expected of him, although he remained at the top level, moving to Tottenham in 2005 for £7 million, with whom he won the Football League Cup in the 2007–08 season. While with Tottenham, he travelled with England to the 2006 FIFA World Cup but was an unused substitute; he played his last England match in 2009.

The latter part of his playing career saw loan spells at Aston Villa in the Premier League in 2011 and Nottingham Forest in the second tier in 2012, before a permanent move to struggling Premier League club Queens Park Rangers in the January 2013 transfer window. Relegated with QPR in May, he played for much of the following season before injury finally forced his retirement. While still recuperating from his final injury, he moved into media work as a pundit, a role which he continued beyond retirement, including for the BBC on Match of the Day, as well as BT Sport. He also co-presented The One Show for the BBC from 2020 until his dismissal in 2024 for inappropriate behaviour.

== Early life and education ==
Jenas was born in Nottingham to a white mother and British-Jamaican father. His father Dennis was born with the surname Genas but had it changed by deed poll as he wanted the initials "D. J.".

Dennis also played semi-professionally with Leicestershire non-league side Shepshed Charterhouse in the 1980s. He grew up on a council estate and was educated at the Catholic Becket School in West Bridgford, Nottinghamshire. According to Jenas, there was "a lot of racism, not only thrown towards me, but also my mum, about my dad and about me, on the street".

== Club career ==
=== Nottingham Forest ===
Jenas began his career at Nottingham Forest, then in the First Division. He made his debut aged 17 on 7 January 2001, starting in a 1–0 home defeat to Wolverhampton Wanderers in the FA Cup. One week later, again as a starter, he played his first league game, and was replaced by David Freeman in the 68th minute of a 3–0 home defeat to Crystal Palace, his only other game of the season.

In the 2001–02 season, Jenas became a regular and scored his first senior goal on 18 August in a 2–1 defeat at Barnsley. After four goals in 33 games across all competitions, Jenas was sold to Newcastle United for £5 million in February 2002.

=== Newcastle United ===
In 2002 Jenas joined Newcastle United from Nottingham Forest. Newcastle United, investing in youth, paid a transfer fee of £5 million for Jenas and he became the second most expensive teenager in British football after Robbie Keane. His club transfer record for a teenager lasted for months when, in the following preseason, Newcastle United broke the club record, and the then British record for a teenager, in signing the 2002 Young European Footballer of the Year award winner and Portuguese international Hugo Viana for £8.5 million. After the 2001–2002 season Jenas first experienced international tournament football, when, being in the England squad, he was involved in the U21 European Championships held in Switzerland.

In the 2001–2002 football season, Jenas played 12 games for Newcastle United and Newcastle United qualified for the 2002–03 Champions League. In his first full season with Newcastle he won the 2002–03 PFA Young Player of the Year award. In the 2002–03 season he managed to play 32 games in the Premier League and scored 6 goals. Jenas failed to repeat his initial form with the club and his two subsequent seasons were disappointing considering his early promise; he was known for his strong "box-to-box" play and ability to score from midfield. In the 2003–04 season Jenas played 31 Premier League games and scored 2 goals. In the 2004–05 season Jenas played 31 games Premier League games and scored one goal. Despite temporarily regaining his form and gaining the vice-captaincy under new manager Graeme Souness early in the 2004–05 season, Jenas' form dipped again with only two goals in 48 appearances. He scored a total of 12 goals in 152 appearances for Newcastle.

At Newcastle United he played alongside international footballers such as, Laurent Robert, Gary Speed, Alan Shearer, Shay Given, Nolberto Solano, Patrick Kluivert and Kieron Dyer. In his first three seasons at Newcastle, Newcastle played in European football; twice in the Champions League, in seasons 2002–03, 2003–04 and twice in the UEFA Cup in seasons 2003–04 after failing at a group stage in the Champions League, and for the 2004–05 UEFA Cup his last season at Newcastle. Jenas also won 14 of his 21 caps for England when with Newcastle United. On 31 August 2005 at the age of 22, Newcastle United accepted an offer of £7 million for him from Tottenham Hotspur.

=== Tottenham Hotspur ===
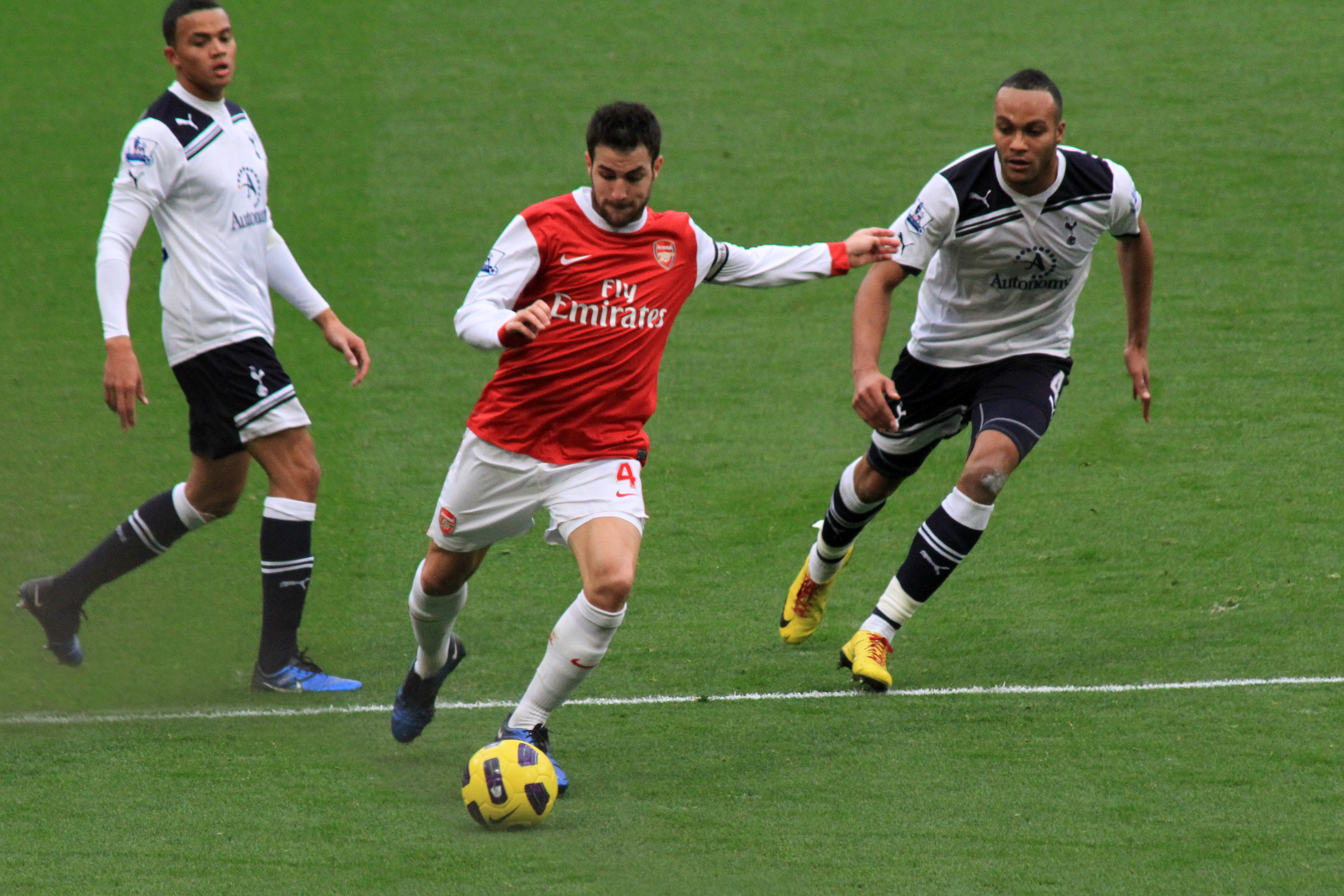
Jenas and Younès Kaboul against Arsenal's Cesc Fàbregas in November 2010

Rumours of Jenas' unhappiness were confirmed early in the 2005–06 season by manager Graeme Souness, when he said that Jenas was not enjoying life at Newcastle, and the player reportedly compared life at the club to living "in a goldfish bowl". He was subsequently sold to Tottenham Hotspur on transfer deadline day – 31 August – for an initial fee of £7 million. Throughout the season, Jenas netted seven goals from midfield as Tottenham qualified for the UEFA Cup. He marked his return from a 13-match absence through injury by scoring the second goal in Tottenham's 3–1 FA Cup fourth round win over Southend United.

Jenas signed a new five-year deal with Tottenham on 29 August 2007, keeping him at the club until 2012. Under Juande Ramos, Jenas' form improved greatly and he initially produced occasional impressive performances, partly due to the new regime but also from some personal words of encouragement from the Spaniard. Jenas played in the 1–1 draw and the 5–1 victory over rivals Arsenal in both legs of the semi-finals of the League Cup, scoring the opening goals in both matches. Jenas set up Jonathan Woodgate for the winning goal in the 2–1 League Cup final victory over Chelsea on 24 February 2008.

At the end of July 2008, Jenas added a one-year extension to his five-year contract, keeping him at Tottenham until 2013. A few days later, he was named as Spurs' new vice-captain following the departures of Robbie Keane and Paul Robinson. On 26 December against Fulham, Jenas made his 100th league appearance for Tottenham. He scored the only goal in a 1–0 win over West Bromwich Albion.

==== Aston Villa loan ====
On 31 August 2011, Jenas joined Aston Villa on a season-long loan deal from Tottenham. He wore the number 8 shirt at Villa, the same number he had while at Spurs. Jenas eventually made his debut for Villa on 5 November, after a series of niggling injuries, coming on as a second-half substitute against Norwich City. Jenas then came on for his second appearance for Villa on 27 November against Swansea City, as a 69th-minute substitute for striker Emile Heskey.

On 3 December, Jenas started his first game for Villa against Manchester United. While playing, he tripped over his own feet and suffered a ruptured Achilles tendon injury in a game that saw him, Shay Given and Javier Hernández all leave on stretchers. The injury kept him out for six months, effectively ending his spell at the club.

==== Return to Nottingham Forest ====
Jenas returned to Tottenham following his surgery, being given the number 21 for forthcoming 2012–13 season. On 28 September 2012, Jenas signed a month-long emergency loan deal with former club Nottingham Forest. He scored his first goal of his loan spell away at Barnsley in a 4–1 win. On 1 November, Forest announced that Jenas' loan had been extended until January 2013 although his final appearance was on 17 November in a home win against Sheffield Wednesday. In the six games he played on loan, Forest did not lose any (with a record of three wins and three draws).

=== Queens Park Rangers ===
On the final day of the January 2013 transfer window, Queens Park Rangers signed Jenas on an 18-month contract for an undisclosed fee from Tottenham, to be re-united with former manager Harry Redknapp. He scored his first goal for the club in a 3–1 home victory over Sunderland on 9 March. He scored again in the following game, on 16 March, a 3–2 defeat against Aston Villa. He made a total of 12 appearances for his new club, but was unable to prevent them being relegated with three games to go. After making 28 appearances for QPR in the Championship, Jenas suffered a ruptured anterior cruciate ligament (ACL) during a training session in April 2014, which ruled him out for the rest of the season. Although his contract expired at the end of the 2013–14 season, he remained with QPR during his rehabilitation process.

== International career ==
Jenas played for England from the under-15 level right up to the senior team, where he made his debut against Australia on 12 February 2003, under manager Sven-Göran Eriksson.

Despite struggling with injury towards the end of the 2005–06 season, he recovered sufficiently to be named in the 2006 FIFA World Cup squad, but did not play at the tournament. In the first game, he had got as far as getting changed to be brought on as a last-minute substitute, before being thwarted by the final whistle.

His improvement at Spurs earned him a call-up to the England squad for Fabio Capello's first game in charge, a friendly against Switzerland at Wembley Stadium on 6 February 2008; Jenas scored the opening goal in the 40th minute as England won 2–1.

In total, Jenas earned 21 caps at senior level, scoring one goal.

== Retirement from football ==
Jenas formally announced his retirement from football on 7 January 2016 on BBC Radio 4's Today programme, having been unable to recover fully from his knee injury. Looking back on his career in 2014, he cited his PFA award and his League Cup win as his career highlights in terms of personal and team achievements respectively, and detailed his biggest regret as never having been able to play for his boyhood club Nottingham Forest at the highest level. On the question of whether or not he had underachieved in his career given his talent at a young age, he answered "yes and no", arguing that he was happy with what he had done, but that he had been held back both by injuries and the shock of losing Bobby Robson as his manager at Newcastle, which "was bigger [to him] than people think it was".

Jenas said that he had played while injured for a few years, simply to be on the pitch because he loved the game, even though it "probably took 10 or 20% out of my play". He also expressed regret at not having got the chance to play at a World Cup, describing his relationship with former England manager Sven-Göran Eriksson as a "love/hate relationship", given he was the one who gave him his debut, but in his view had not given him a fair chance nor used him properly when he did play him.

== Post-playing career ==
=== Football television coverage ===
After Jenas was released by QPR, he moved into television as a freelance pundit, firstly as an analyst for ITV Sport's coverage of the 2014–15 UEFA Europa League. In November 2014, he joined BT Sport where he regularly featured in the studio alongside other pundits to provide analysis on the game.

On 1 April 2022, Jenas was the "Draw Conductor" for the 2022 FIFA World Cup draw.

In September 2023, Jenas wrote on Twitter that referee Robert Jones was a "complete shithouse" and said that all referees were ruining football. After being challenged by a refereeing charity due to his platform as a television pundit, he apologised.

=== Other broadcasting ===
In 2015, Jenas appeared as part of Channel 4's Time Crashers, a reality television programme in which celebrities were assigned the tasks of living in different historical eras.

Jenas presented a BBC Three documentary in April 2017 on knife-crime, focusing on his home town of Nottingham. During Teenage Knife Wars, he recalled an incident in his youth where he was the victim of a knife-point robbery.

In April 2023, Channel 4 commissioned The World's Most Expensive Trainers; an upcoming documentary that Jenas will present.

In December 2023, it was announced Jenas would serve as lead presenter for TNT Sports for the UK coverage of the FIA Formula E World Championship starting from the 2023–24 season. Jenas was not retained following his first season and was replaced as lead presenter by long-time pit reporter Nicki Shields.

In 2020, Jenas began co-presenting The One Show on BBC One with Alex Jones. In 2021 Jenas became one of its permanent hosts. In August 2024, Jenas was dismissed by the BBC with immediate effect for inappropriate behaviour, following complaints about messages sent to colleagues. He was also dropped by his talent agency, M&C Saatchi Merlin.

Jenas has endorsed the clothing retailer Jacamo, and the bookmaker William Hill.

== Personal life ==
Jenas and his wife Ellie have two daughters together, while he also has a daughter from a previous relationship who lives in the United States with her mother. On 8 October 2021, Jenas announced the birth of his son. As of 2014, he lives in Hertfordshire. He enjoys cooking.

Jenas and a friend set up the Aquinas Foundation, which offers football tickets to truant students at disadvantaged schools in Nottingham and London if they can achieve a 100% attendance.

In October 2022, Jenas was fined £2,070 and banned from driving for six months for speeding and using his mobile phone in two hands while driving on the M25 motorway in Hertfordshire.

== Career statistics ==
=== Club ===
Appearances and goals by club, season and competition
Club	Season	League			FA Cup		League Cup		Europe		Total	
Club	Season	Division	Apps	Goals	Apps	Goals	Apps	Goals	Apps	Goals	Apps	Goals
Nottingham Forest	2000–01	First Division	1	0	1	0	0	0	—		2	0
Nottingham Forest	2001–02	First Division	28	4	1	0	2	0	—		31	4
Nottingham Forest	Total		29	4	2	0	2	0	—		33	4
Newcastle United	2001–02	Premier League	12	0	—		—		—		12	0
Newcastle United	2002–03	Premier League	32	6	1	1	0	0	8 (Note: Appearances in UEFA Champions League)	0	41	7
Newcastle United	2003–04	Premier League	31	2	2	0	1	0	12 (Note: Ten appearances and one goal in UEFA Cup, two in UEFA Champions League)	1	46	3
Newcastle United	2004–05	Premier League	31	1	4	0	2	1	11 (Note: Appearances in UEFA Cup)	0	48	2
Newcastle United	2005–06	Premier League	4	0	—		—		1 (Note: Appearances in UEFA Intertoto Cup)	0	5	0
Newcastle United	Total		110	9	7	1	3	1	32	1	152	12
Tottenham Hotspur	2005–06	Premier League	30	6	1	1	1	0	—		32	7
Tottenham Hotspur	2006–07	Premier League	25	6	2	1	1	0	6	1	34	8
Tottenham Hotspur	2007–08	Premier League	29	4	3	0	6	2	7	0	45	6
Tottenham Hotspur	2008–09	Premier League	32	4	0	0	3	0	4	0	39	4
Tottenham Hotspur	2009–10	Premier League	19	1	2	0	2	0	—		23	1
Tottenham Hotspur	2010–11	Premier League	19	0	1	0	0	0	8	0	28	0
Tottenham Hotspur	2011–12	Premier League	0	0	0	0	0	0	0	0	0	0
Tottenham Hotspur	2012–13	Premier League	1	0	0	0	0	0	0	0	1	0
Tottenham Hotspur	Total		155	21	9	2	13	2	25	1	202	26
Aston Villa (loan)	2011–12	Premier League	3	0	—		—		—		3	0
Nottingham Forest (loan)	2012–13	Championship	6	1	—		—		—		6	1
Queens Park Rangers	2012–13	Premier League	12	2	—		—		—		12	2
Queens Park Rangers	2013–14	Championship	26	2	0	0	2	0	0	0	28	2
Queens Park Rangers	Total		38	4	0	0	2	0	0	0	40	4
Career total			341	39	18	3	20	3	57	2	436	47

=== International ===
Appearances and goals by national team and year
National team	Year	Apps	Goals
England	2003	4	0
England	2004	5	0
England	2005	5	0
England	2006	1	0
England	2007	2	0
England	2008	3	1
England	2009	1	0
Total		21	1

England score listed first, score column indicates score after each Jenas goal.

International goals by date, venue, cap, opponent, score, result and competition
No.	Date	Venue	Cap	Opponent	Score	Result	Competition
1	6 February 2008	Wembley Stadium, London, England	18	Switzerland	1–0	2–1	Friendly

== Honours ==
Tottenham Hotspur

- Football League Cup: 2007–08; runner-up: 2008–09

Individual

- PFA Young Player of the Year: 2002–03
- Women's Football Ally of the Year at the Women's Football Awards: 2024
