= Wayne Quinn =

English footballer (born 1976)

Personal information
- Date of birth: 19 November 1976 (age 49)
- Place of birth: Truro, England
- Height: 6 ft 0 in (1.83 m)
- Position: Left-back

Youth career
- Sheffield United

Senior career*
Years	Team	Apps	(Gls)
1995–2001	Sheffield United	139	(6)
2001	→ Newcastle United (loan)	4	(0)
2001–2004	Newcastle United	11	(0)
2003	→ Sheffield United (loan)	6	(0)
2003–2004	→ West Ham United (loan)	22	(0)
- Penzance
2012	Falmouth Town		
2013–2016	Mousehole		
Total		204	(6)

International career
1998	England B	1	(0)
- * Club domestic league appearances and goals

Wayne Quinn (born 19 November 1976) is an English former professional footballer who played as a left-back.

== Club career ==
=== Sheffield United ===
Quinn started his career at Sheffield United, breaking into their first team in 1997.

=== Newcastle United ===
In 2001 Quinn was loaned to Newcastle United, who later purchased him for £800,000. After a difficult time at the club, scoring once against Lokeren in the Intertoto Cup, he was loaned back out to Sheffield United, and then West Ham United before being released on a free transfer in 2004.

=== Non-league ===
After Quinn left West Ham United at the age of 28 he did not sign for another professional club. It was reported in the Plymouth Evening Herald that Quinn was offered a trial by English Championship club Plymouth Argyle but declined the opportunity, preferring to play amateur football in Cornwall because of a bad injury which led to surgery.

Quinn played for and managed Penzance along with Gary Marks, and in April 2012 he transferred to Falmouth Town, making his first appearance at centre back in a 1–1 draw at home to Elburton Villa.

He was appointed player-manager of South Western Premier League Division One West club Mousehole in 2013.

Quinn left Mousehole in 2016 after stepping down from his first team coach role.

== International career ==
Quinn played for England's Under 21 team. He also played for England B in 1998, a result which was a 4–1 England win.
