= 2000–01 Newcastle United F.C. season =

Newcastle United
2000–01 season
- Chairman: Freddy Shepherd
- Manager: Sir Bobby Robson
- Stadium: St James' Park
- Premier League: 11th
- FA Cup: Third round
- League Cup: Fourth round
- Top goalscorer: League: Carl Cort; Nolberto Solano (6 each); All: Carl Cort; Nolberto Solano; Alan Shearer (7 each)
- Average home league attendance: 51,309
| Home colours | Away colours |

During the 2000–01 English football season, Newcastle United F.C. competed in the FA Premier League. This article covers the squad and match results for that season.

== Season summary ==
Bobby Robson's first full season as Newcastle manager saw them finish 11th once again - more than high enough to avoid relegation, but not quite high enough to get into Europe.

== Competitions ==
| Pos | Team | Pld | W | D | L | GF | GA | GD | Pts | Qualification or relegation |
|---|---|---|---|---|---|---|---|---|---|---|
| 9 | Charlton Athletic | 38 | 14 | 10 | 14 | 50 | 57 | −7 | 52 | |
| 10 | Southampton | 38 | 14 | 10 | 14 | 40 | 48 | −8 | 52 | |
| 11 | Newcastle United | 38 | 14 | 9 | 15 | 44 | 50 | −6 | 51 | Qualification for the Intertoto Cup third round |
| 12 | Tottenham Hotspur | 38 | 13 | 10 | 15 | 47 | 54 | −7 | 49 | |
| 13 | Leicester City | 38 | 14 | 6 | 18 | 39 | 51 | −12 | 48 | |

Source: Premier League
Rules for classification: 1) points; 2) goal difference; 3) number of goals scored.

Results summary

| Overall | | | | | | | | Home | | | | | | Away | | | | | |
| Pld | W | D | L | GF | GA | GD | Pts | W | D | L | GF | GA | GD | W | D | L | GF | GA | GD |
|---|---|---|---|---|---|---|---|---|---|---|---|---|---|---|---|---|---|---|---|
| 38 | 14 | 9 | 15 | 44 | 50 | −6 | 51 | 10 | 4 | 5 | 26 | 17 | +9 | 4 | 5 | 10 | 18 | 33 | −15 |

Source: 2000-01 FA Premier League table

Results by round

| Round | 1 | 2 | 3 | 4 | 5 | 6 | 7 | 8 | 9 | 10 | 11 | 12 | 13 | 14 | 15 | 16 | 17 | 18 | 19 | 20 | 21 | 22 | 23 | 24 | 25 | 26 | 27 | 28 | 29 | 30 | 31 | 32 | 33 | 34 | 35 | 36 | 37 | 38 |
|---|---|---|---|---|---|---|---|---|---|---|---|---|---|---|---|---|---|---|---|---|---|---|---|---|---|---|---|---|---|---|---|---|---|---|---|---|---|---|
| Ground | A | H | H | A | H | A | H | A | A | H | A | H | A | H | H | A | A | H | A | H | H | A | H | A | A | A | H | A | H | A | A | H | A | H | H | A | H | H |
| Result | L | W | W | W | D | L | L | W | W | L | L | W | D | L | W | D | L | W | L | W | D | L | W | W | L | L | L | D | L | D | L | W | D | W | D | L | D | W |
| Position | 19 | 12 | 3 | 1 | 3 | 6 | 7 | 3 | 3 | 4 | 8 | 5 | 7 | 8 | 7 | 8 | 10 | 7 | 8 | 7 | 7 | 8 | 7 | 6 | 7 | 10 | 11 | 11 | 12 | 13 | 14 | 13 | 13 | 10 | 10 | 11 | 11 | 11 |

Source: 11v11.com: 2000-01 Newcastle United results
A = Away; H = Home; W = Win; D = Draw; L = Loss

=== Premier League ===
| 20 August 2000 | Manchester United | 2–0 | Newcastle United | Manchester |
| 16:00 | Johnsen 20'; Cole 69' | Report | | Stadium: Old Trafford; Attendance: 67,477; Referee: Stephen Lodge |

| 23 August 2000 | Newcastle United | 3–2 | Derby County | Newcastle upon Tyne |
| 19:45 | Cort 30' (pen.); Cordone 46'; Glass 55'; Barton (red card) 78' | Report | Strupar 45'; Johnson 83' | Stadium: St James' Park; Attendance: 51,327; Referee: Dermot Gallagher |

| 26 August 2000 | Newcastle United | 2–0 | Tottenham Hotspur | Newcastle upon Tyne |
| | Speed 9'; Cordone 66' | Report | | Stadium: St James' Park; Attendance: 51,573; Referee: David Elleray |

| 6 September 2000 | Coventry City | 0–2 | Newcastle United | Coventry |
| 19:45 | | Report | Shearer 30' (pen.); Gallacher 58' | Stadium: Highfield Road; Attendance: 22,109; Referee: Alan Wiley |

| 9 September 2000 | Newcastle United | 0–0 | Chelsea | Newcastle upon Tyne |
| 15:00 | | | | Stadium: St James' Park; Attendance: 51,687; Referee: Graham Poll |

| 16 September 2000 | Southampton | 2–0 | Newcastle United | Southampton |
| 15:00 | Pahars 47', 61' | Report | | Stadium: The Dell; Attendance: 15,211; Referee: Barry Knight |

| 23 September 2000 | Newcastle United | 0–1 | Charlton Athletic | Newcastle upon Tyne |
| 15:00 | | Report | Stuart 8' | Stadium: St James' Park; Attendance: 50,866; Referee: Andy D'Urso |

| 30 September 2000 | Manchester City | 0–1 | Newcastle United | Manchester |
| 15:00 | | Report | Shearer 74' | Stadium: Maine Road; Attendance: 34,497; Referee: Paul Taylor |

| 16 October 2000 | Middlesbrough | 1–3 | Newcastle United | Middlesbrough |
| 20:00 | Deane 90' | Report | Shearer 38'; Goma 55'; Dyer 89' | Stadium: Riverside Stadium; Attendance: 31,463; Referee: Steve Dunn |

| 21 October 2000 | Newcastle United | 0–1 | Everton | Newcastle upon Tyne |
| 15:00 | | Report | Campbell 80' | Stadium: St James' Park; Attendance: 51,625; Referee: Mark Halsey |

| 28 October 2000 | West Ham United | 1–0 | Newcastle United | London |
| 15:00 | Kanouté 73' | Report | | Stadium: Boleyn Ground; Attendance: 26,044; Referee: Mike Riley |

| 4 November 2000 | Newcastle United | 2–1 | Ipswich Town | Newcastle upon Tyne |
| 15:00 | Shearer 22', 67' (pen.) | Report | Stewart 13' | Stadium: St James' Park; Attendance: 50,922; Referee: Alan Wiley |

| 11 November 2000 | Leicester City | 1–1 | Newcastle United | Leicester |
| 15:00 | Gunnlaugsson 63' | Report | Speed 75' | Stadium: Filbert Street; Attendance: 21,406; Referee: Rob Styles |

| 18 November 2000 | Newcastle United | 1–2 | Sunderland | Newcastle upon Tyne |
| 15:00 | Speed 4' | Report | Hutchison 68'; Quinn 76' | Stadium: St James' Park; Attendance: 52,030; Referee: Graham Poll |

| 26 November 2000 | Newcastle United | 2–1 | Liverpool | Newcastle upon Tyne |
| 15:00 | Solano 4'; Dyer 70' | Report | Heskey 78' | Stadium: St James' Park; Attendance: 51,949; Referee: Barry Knight |

| 2 December 2000 | Aston Villa | 1–1 | Newcastle United | Birmingham |
| 15:00 | Dublin 4' | Report | Solano 82' | Stadium: Villa Park; Attendance: 34,255; Referee: David Elleray |

| 9 December 2000 | Arsenal | 5–0 | Newcastle United | London |
| 15:00 | Henry 13'; Parlour 16', 86', 90'; Kanu 52' | Report | | Stadium: Highbury; Attendance: 38,052; Referee: Mike Dean |

| 16 December 2000 | Newcastle United | 2–1 | Bradford City | Newcastle upon Tyne |
| 15:00 | Speed 15'; Dyer 70' | Report | Molenaar 83' | Stadium: St James' Park; Attendance: 50,470; Referee: Steve Dunn |

| 23 December 2000 | Derby County | 2–0 | Newcastle United | Derby |
| 15:00 | Carbonari 33'; Burton 73' | Report | | Stadium: Pride Park Stadium; Attendance: 29,978; Referee: Rob Harris |

| 26 December 2000 | Newcastle United | 2–1 | Leeds United | Newcastle upon Tyne |
| 15:00 | Solano 41'; Acunã 44' | Report | Dacourt 10' | Stadium: St James' Park; Attendance: 52,118; Referee: Andy D'Urso |

| 30 December 2000 | Newcastle United | 1–1 | Manchester United | Newcastle upon Tyne |
| 15:00 | Glass 81' | Report | Beckham 25' (pen.) | Stadium: St James' Park; Attendance: 52,134; Referee: Mike Riley |

| 2 January 2001 | Tottenham Hotspur | 4–2 | Newcastle United | London |
| 19:45 | Doherty 27'; Anderton 30'; Rebrov 35'; Sullivan (red card) 48'; Ferdinand 77' | Report | Solano 23'; Solano (red card) 32'; Dyer 49'; Dyer (red card) 53' | Stadium: White Hart Lane; Attendance: 34,324; Referee: Steve Bennett |

| 13 January 2001 | Newcastle United | 3–1 | Coventry City | Newcastle upon Tyne |
| 15:00 | Speed 4'; Ameobi 58'; Dyer 66' | Report | Glass 78' (o.g.) | Stadium: St James' Park; Attendance: 50,159; Referee: Jeff Winter |

| 20 January 2001 | Leeds United | 1–3 | Newcastle United | Leeds |
| 15:00 | Keane 2' | Report | Solano 4' (pen.); Acuña 44'; Ameobi 58' | Stadium: Elland Road; Attendance: 40,005; Referee: Alan Wiley |

| 31 January 2001 | Chelsea | 3–1 | Newcastle United | London |
| 19:45 | Zola 37'; Poyet 62'; Grønkjær 79' | | Bassedas 23' | Stadium: Stamford Bridge; Attendance: 35,108; Referee: Mark Halsey |

| 11 February 2001 | Charlton Athletic | 2–0 | Newcastle United | London |
| 16:00 | Svensson 37'; Bartlett 43' | Report | | Stadium: The Valley; Attendance: 24,151; Referee: Andy D'Urso |

| 24 February 2001 | Newcastle United | 0–1 | Manchester City | Newcastle upon Tyne |
| 15:00 | | Report | Goater 61' | Stadium: St James' Park; Attendance: 51,981; Referee: Rob Harris |

| 3 March 2001 | Everton | 1–1 | Newcastle United | Liverpool |
| 15:00 | Unsworth 82' (pen.) | Report | Unsworth 47' (o.g.) | Stadium: Goodison Park; Attendance: 35,779; Referee: David Elleray |

| 17 March 2001 | Newcastle United | 1–2 | Middlesbrough | Newcastle upon Tyne |
| 15:00 | Cort 60' | Report | Bokšić 28', 33'; Stamp (yellow card) 45' (red card) | Stadium: St James' Park; Attendance: 51,751; Referee: Mark Halsey |

| 31 March 2001 | Bradford City | 2–2 | Newcastle United | Bradford |
| 15:00 | Wetherall 8'; Blake 10' (pen.) | Report | Cort 25'; Acuña 77' | Stadium: Valley Parade; Attendance: 20,160; Referee: David Elleray |

| 14 April 2001 | Ipswich Town | 1–0 | Newcastle United | Ipswich |
| | Stewart 76' (pen.) | Report | | Stadium: Portman Road; Attendance: 24,028; Referee: Mike Dean |

| 16 April 2001 | Newcastle United | 2–1 | West Ham United | Newcastle upon Tyne |
| 15:00 | Cort 32'; Solano 56' (pen.) | Report | Lampard 80' (pen.) | Stadium: St James' Park; Attendance: 51,107; Referee: Paul Durkin |

| 21 April 2001 | Sunderland | 1–1 | Newcastle United | Sunderland |
| 17:15 | Carteron 67' | Report | O'Brien 78' | Stadium: Stadium of Light; Attendance: 48,277; Referee: Mike Riley |

| 28 April 2001 | Newcastle United | 1–0 | Leicester City | Newcastle upon Tyne |
| 15:00 | Cort 90' | Report | | Stadium: St James' Park; Attendance: 50,501; Referee: Graham Poll |

| 1 May 2001 | Newcastle United | 1–1 | Southampton | Newcastle upon Tyne |
| 20:00 | Gallacher 26' | Report | Pahars 81' | Stadium: St James' Park; Attendance: 50,439; Referee: Stephen Lodge |

| 5 May 2001 | Liverpool | 3–0 | Newcastle United | Liverpool |
| 15:00 | Owen 25', 72', 81' | Report | | Stadium: Anfield; Attendance: 44,363; Referee: Mark Halsey |

| 15 May 2001 | Newcastle United | 0–0 | Arsenal | Newcastle upon Tyne |
| 19:45 | | Report | | Stadium: St James' Park; Attendance: 50,729; Referee: Alan Wiley |

| 19 May 2001 | Newcastle United | 3–0 | Aston Villa | Newcastle upon Tyne |
| 15:00 | Glass 9'; Cort 13'; Delaney 74' (o.g.) | Report | | Stadium: St James' Park; Attendance: 51,506; Referee: Barry Knight |

=== FA Cup ===
| 7 January 2001 Round 3 | Newcastle United | 1–1 | Aston Villa | Newcastle upon Tyne |
| 16:00 | Dyer 80' | Report | Stone 55' | Stadium: St James' Park; Attendance: 37,682; Referee: Paul Durkin |

| 17 January 2001 Round 3r | Aston Villa | 1–0 | Newcastle United | Birmingham |
| 19:45 | Vassell 50' | | | Stadium: Villa Park; Attendance: 25,387; Referee: Paul Durkin |

=== League Cup ===
| 20 September 2000 Round 2 | Newcastle United | 2–0 | Leyton Orient | Newcastle upon Tyne |
| 19:45 | Cort 34'; Speed 77' | Report | | Stadium: St James' Park; Attendance: 37,284; Referee: Anthony Leake |

| 26 September 2000 Round 2 | Leyton Orient | 1–1 (1 - 3 agg.) | Newcastle United | Leyton |
| 19:45 | Watts 45' | Report | Gallacher 32' | Stadium: Brisbane Road; Attendance: 9,552; Referee: Peter Jones |

| 1 November 2000 Round 3 | Newcastle United | 4–3 | Bradford City | Newcastle upon Tyne |
| 19:45 | Shearer 22', 29'; Cordone 27'; S. Caldwell 73' | Report | Nolan 31'; Ward 57', 70' | Stadium: St James' Park; Attendance: 41,847; Referee: Mike Dean |

| 29 November 2000 Round 4 | Birmingham City | 2–1 | Newcastle United | Birmingham |
| 19:45 | Adebola 31'; Johnson 90' | | Dyer 13' | Stadium: St Andrew's; Attendance: 18,520; Referee: Steve Bennett |

== Pre-season ==
| 22 July 2000 | D.C. United | 3–1 | Newcastle United | Washington, D.C. |
| | Moreno 28'; Llamosa 33'; Marino 51' | | Cordone 67' | Stadium: RFK Stadium; Attendance: 17,610 |

| 26 July 2000 | Columbus Crew | 2–2 | Newcastle United | Columbus, Ohio |
| | Joseph 67'; Cunningham 85' | | Cort 32', 84' | Stadium: Crew Stadium; Attendance: 18,212 |

| 31 July 2000 | Burnley | 0–1 | Newcastle United | Turf Moor |
| 19:45 | | | Cort 25' | Stadium: Burnley; Attendance: 11,441; Referee: Chris Foy |

| 5 August 2000 | Feyenoord | 2–1 | Newcastle United | Rotterdam |
| 20:00 | Tomasson 17'; Korneev 59' | | Lee 44' | Stadium: De Kuip; Attendance: 32,340; Referee: René Temmink |

| 13 August 2000 | RCD Espanyol | 2–1 | Newcastle United | Barcelona |
| | Rotchen 62'; Garcia 71' | | Shearer 49' | Stadium: Estadi Cornellà-El Prat; Attendance: 7,900 |

== First-team squad ==
Squad at end of season

Note: Flags indicate national team as defined under FIFA eligibility rules; some limited exceptions apply. Players may hold more than one non-FIFA nationality.

| No. | Pos. | Nation | Player |
|---|---|---|---|
| 1 | GK | IRL | Shay Given |
| 2 | DF | ENG | Warren Barton |
| 3 | DF | ESP | Marcelino |
| 5 | DF | IRL | Andy O'Brien |
| 6 | MF | CHI | Clarence Acuña |
| 7 | MF | ENG | Rob Lee |
| 8 | MF | ENG | Kieron Dyer |
| 9 | FW | ENG | Alan Shearer (captain) |
| 10 | MF | ARG | Christian Bassedas |
| 11 | MF | WAL | Gary Speed |
| 12 | DF | ENG | Andy Griffin |
| 13 | GK | ENG | Steve Harper |
| 14 | DF | ENG | Wayne Quinn |

| No. | Pos. | Nation | Player |
|---|---|---|---|
| 15 | MF | PER | Nolberto Solano |
| 16 | FW | ENG | Carl Cort |
| 17 | MF | ARG | Daniel Cordone |
| 18 | DF | NIR | Aaron Hughes |
| 19 | MF | SCO | Stephen Glass |
| 20 | FW | COD | Lomana LuaLua |
| 21 | MF | PAR | Diego Gavilán |
| 23 | FW | ENG | Shola Ameobi |
| 25 | MF | SCO | Brian Kerr |
| 26 | MF | ENG | James Coppinger |
| 30 | DF | SCO | Steven Caldwell |
| 32 | FW | SCO | Kevin Gallacher |
| 34 | DF | GRE | Nikos Dabizas |

=== Left club during season ===
Note: Flags indicate national team as defined under FIFA eligibility rules; some limited exceptions apply. Players may hold more than one non-FIFA nationality.

| No. | Pos. | Nation | Player |
|---|---|---|---|
| 4 | DF | FRA | Didier Domi (to Paris Saint-Germain) |
| 5 | DF | FRA | Alain Goma (to Fulham) |
| 24 | MF | SCO | Garry Brady (to Portsmouth) |

| No. | Pos. | Nation | Player |
|---|---|---|---|
| 37 | DF | FRA | Laurent Charvet (to Manchester City) |
| 40 | DF | ENG | Carl Serrant (retired) |

== Reserves and youth ==
=== Reserve squad ===
The following players did not make an appearance for the senior squad this season.

Note: Flags indicate national team as defined under FIFA eligibility rules; some limited exceptions apply. Players may hold more than one non-FIFA nationality.

| No. | Pos. | Nation | Player |
|---|---|---|---|
| 22 | MF | ENG | Jamie McClen |
| 27 | DF | ENG | David Beharall |
| 29 | GK | NED | John Karelse |
| 31 | MF | ENG | Stuart Green |
| 33 | MF | ENG | Des Hamilton |
| 35 | DF | FRA | Olivier Bernard |
| 36 | DF | SCO | Gary Caldwell |
| 39 | FW | IRL | David McMahon |
| — | GK | ENG | Jonny Brain |
| — | GK | SCO | Stephen Grindlay |
| — | DF | ENG | Roy Gordon |
| — | DF | SCO | Keith Barr |
| — | DF | SCO | Ryan McGuffie |

| No. | Pos. | Nation | Player |
|---|---|---|---|
| — | MF | ENG | Mark Boyd |
| — | MF | ENG | Oliver Cowie |
| — | MF | IRL | Alan O'Brien |
| — | MF | POR | Pedro Dimas |
| — | MF | NZL | David Rayner |
| — | FW | ARG | Pablo Bonvín |
| — | FW | ENG | Michael Chopra |
| — | FW | ENG | Jonathan Mann |
| — | FW | ENG | Peter Wright |
| — | FW | WAL | Kevin Gall |
| — | FW | SCO | Colin McMenamin |
| — | FW | IRL | Paul Knight |

=== Trialists ===
Note: Flags indicate national team as defined under FIFA eligibility rules; some limited exceptions apply. Players may hold more than one non-FIFA nationality.

| No. | Pos. | Nation | Player |
|---|---|---|---|
| — | DF | ENG | Simon Downer (on trial from Leyton Orient) |
| — | DF | ENG | Robert Ullathorne |
| — | DF | POR | Fredy (on trial from Felguerias) |
| — | DF | BLR | Sergei Gurenko (on trial from Roma) |
| — | DF | ARG | Pablo Paz (on trial from Tenerife) |
| — | DF | PER | Martín Hidalgo (on trial from Sporting Cristal) |
| — | DF | TRI | Dennis Lawrence (on trial from Defense Force) |

| No. | Pos. | Nation | Player |
|---|---|---|---|
| — | DF | CHN | Sun Jihai (on trial from Dalian Shide) |
| — | MF | POR | Bruno (on trial from Marítimo) |
| — | MF | LBY | Tarik El Taib (on trial from Al-Ahli SC) |
| — | FW | ARG | Pablo Facundo Bonvín (on trial from Boca Juniors) |
| — | FW | ARG | Esteban José Herrera (on trial from Boca Juniors) |
| — | MF | | Carte |
| — | FW | | Carmen Alegranza |

== Appearances, goals and cards ==
Starts + substitute appearances

| No. | Pos. | Name | League | | FA Cup | | League Cup | | Total | | Discipline | |
| No. | Pos. | Name | Apps | Goals | Apps | Goals | Apps | Goals | Apps | Goals | Yellow card | Red card |
|---|---|---|---|---|---|---|---|---|---|---|---|---|
| 1 | GK | (Republic of Ireland) Shay Given | 34 | 0 | 0 | 0 | 1 | 0 | 35 | 0 | 1 | 0 |
| 2 | DF | (England) Warren Barton | 27+2 | 0 | 1+1 | 0 | 1 | 0 | 29+3 | 0 | 5 | 1 |
| 3 | DF | (Spain) Marcelino | 5+1 | 0 | 1 | 0 | 0 | 0 | 6+1 | 0 | 1 | 0 |
| 4 | DF | (France) Didier Domi | 11+3 | 0 | 0 | 0 | 1+1 | 0 | 12+4 | 0 | 2 | 0 |
| 5 | DF | (France) Alain Goma | 18+1 | 1 | 2 | 0 | 3 | 0 | 23+1 | 1 | 3 | 0 |
| 5 | DF | (Republic of Ireland) Andy O'Brien | 9 | 1 | 0 | 0 | 0 | 0 | 9 | 1 | 0 | 0 |
| 6 | MF | (Chile) Clarence Acuña | 23+3 | 3 | 2 | 0 | 1 | 0 | 26+3 | 3 | 5 | 0 |
| 7 | MF | (England) Rob Lee | 21+1 | 0 | 0 | 0 | 3+1 | 0 | 24+2 | 0 | 4 | 0 |
| 8 | MF | (England) Kieron Dyer | 25+1 | 5 | 1 | 0 | 4 | 1 | 30+1 | 6 | 0 | 1 |
| 9 | FW | (England) Alan Shearer | 19 | 5 | 0 | 0 | 4 | 2 | 23 | 7 | 1 | 0 |
| 10 | MF | (Argentina) Christian Bassedas | 17+5 | 1 | 2 | 0 | 1+1 | 0 | 20+6 | 1 | 6 | 0 |
| 11 | MF | (Wales) Gary Speed | 35 | 5 | 2 | 0 | 4 | 1 | 41 | 6 | 9 | 0 |
| 12 | DF | (England) Andy Griffin | 14+5 | 0 | 2 | 0 | 4 | 0 | 20+5 | 0 | 3 | 0 |
| 13 | GK | (England) Steve Harper | 4+1 | 0 | 2 | 0 | 3 | 0 | 9+1 | 0 | 0 | 0 |
| 14 | DF | (England) Wayne Quinn | 14+1 | 0 | 0 | 0 | 0 | 0 | 14+1 | 0 | 0 | 0 |
| 15 | MF | (Peru) Nolberto Solano | 31+2 | 6 | 1 | 1 | 3+1 | 0 | 35+3 | 7 | 3 | 2 |
| 16 | FW | (England) Carl Cort | 13 | 6 | 0 | 0 | 2 | 1 | 15 | 7 | 1 | 0 |
| 17 | FW | (Argentina) Daniel Cordone | 12+9 | 2 | 0+2 | 0 | 1+3 | 1 | 13+14 | 3 | 0 | 0 |
| 18 | DF | (Northern Ireland) Aaron Hughes | 34+1 | 0 | 2 | 0 | 3 | 0 | 39+1 | 0 | 2 | 0 |
| 19 | MF | (Scotland) Stephen Glass | 5+9 | 3 | 1+1 | 0 | 0 | 0 | 6+10 | 3 | 2 | 0 |
| 20 | FW | (Democratic Republic of the Congo) Lomana LuaLua | 3+18 | 0 | 0+2 | 0 | 0 | 0 | 3+20 | 0 | 2 | 0 |
| 21 | MF | (Paraguay) Diego Gavilán | 0+1 | 0 | 0 | 0 | 0+1 | 0 | 0+2 | 0 | 0 | 0 |
| 23 | FW | (Nigeria) Shola Ameobi | 12+8 | 2 | 2 | 0 | 0 | 0 | 14+8 | 2 | 0 | 0 |
| 25 | MF | (Scotland) Brian Kerr | 0+1 | 0 | 0 | 0 | 0 | 0 | 0+1 | 0 | 0 | 0 |
| 26 | MF | (England) James Coppinger | 0+1 | 0 | 0 | 0 | 0 | 0 | 0+1 | 0 | 0 | 0 |
| 30 | DF | (Scotland) Steven Caldwell | 5+4 | 0 | 0 | 0 | 1 | 1 | 6+4 | 1 | 1 | 0 |
| 32 | FW | (Scotland) Kevin Gallacher | 12+7 | 2 | 1 | 0 | 2 | 1 | 14+7 | 3 | 0 | 0 |
| 34 | DF | (Greece) Nikos Dabizas | 9 | 0 | 0 | 0 | 0 | 0 | 9 | 0 | 1 | 0 |
| 37 | DF | (France) Laurent Charvet | 6+1 | 0 | 0 | 0 | 2 | 0 | 8+1 | 0 | 0 | 0 |

=== Coaching staff ===
| Position | Staff |
|---|---|
| Manager | (England) Bobby Robson |
| Assistant Manager | (England) John Carver |
| First Team coach | (England) Nigel Pearson |
| Goalkeeping Coach | (England) Andy Woodman |
| Development Coach | (Scotland) Steve Clarke |
| Reserve Team Coach | (England) Terry McDermott |
| Chief scout | (England) Arthur Cox |

Last updated: 3 May 2011

== Club transfers ==
=== In ===
| Date | Pos. | Name | From | Fee |
|---|---|---|---|---|
| 1 June 2000 | MF | (Argentina) Christian Bassedas | (Argentina) Vélez Sársfield | £3,500,000 |
| 26 June 2000 | FW | (Argentina) Daniel Cordone | (Argentina) Racing Club | £500,000 (loan) |
| 5 July 2000 | FW | (England) Carl Cort | (England) Wimbledon | £7,000,000 |
| August 2000 | DF | (Scotland) Ryan McGuffie | (Scotland) Annan Athletic | Nominal fee |
| September 2000 | DF | (France) Olivier Bernard | (France) Lyon | Free |
| September 2000 | FW | (Democratic Republic of the Congo) Lomana LuaLua | (England) Colchester United | £2,200,000 |
| October 2000 | MF | (Chile) Clarence Acuña | Universidad de Chile | £1,000,000 |
| February 2001 | DF | (England) Wayne Quinn | (England) Sheffield United | £1,000,000 |
| March 2001 | DF | (Republic of Ireland) Andy O'Brien | (England) Bradford City | £2,000,000 |

- Total spending: ▼£17,200,000

=== Out ===
| Date | Pos. | Name | To | Fee |
|---|---|---|---|---|
| June 2000 | MF | (Brazil) Fumaça | Unattched | Free |
| 30 June 2000 | DF | (Italy) Alessandro Pistone | (England) Everton | £3,000,000 |
| 21 July 2000 | MF | (England) Stuart Elliott | (England) Darlington | Free |
| 21 July 2000 | MF | (Croatia) Silvio Marić | (Portugal) Porto | £2,000,000 |
| July 2000 | FW | (England) Paul Robinson | (England) Wimbledon | £1,500,000 |
| July 2000 | GK | (France) Lionel Perez | (England) Cambridge United | Free |
| August 2000 | MF | (Georgia (country)) Temur Ketsbaia | (England) Wolverhampton Wanderers | £900,000 |
| August 2000 | DF | (England) Steve Howey | (England) Manchester City | £3,000,000 |
| August 2000 | FW | (Scotland) Duncan Ferguson | (England) Everton | £4,000,000 |
| October 2000 | DF | (France) Laurent Charvet | (England) Manchester City | £1,500,000 |
| January 2001 | DF | (France) Didier Domi | (France) Paris Saint-Germain | £3,000,000 |
| March 2001 | DF | (France) Alain Goma | (England) Fulham | £3,500,000 |

- Total spending: ▲£22,400,000
