= 2001–02 Sheffield Wednesday F.C. season =

English football club season

Sheffield Wednesday
2001–02 season
- Chairman: Geoff Hulley
- Manager: Peter Shreeves (until 17 October); Terry Yorath (from 17 October)
- First Division: 20th
- FA Cup: Third round
- League Cup: Semi-finals
- Top goalscorer: League: Sibon (12); All: Sibon (13)
- Highest home attendance: 29,772 v Wolverhampton Wanderers (Division One)
- Lowest home attendance: 8,796 v Crystal Palace (League Cup)
- Average home league attendance: 20,870 (League games only)

The 2001–02 season was Sheffield Wednesday F.C.'s 135th season. They competed in the twenty-four team First Division, the second tier of English football, finishing twentieth.

== Season summary ==
After another bad start in the 2001–02 season, Shreeves handed the reins over to assistant Terry Yorath. Wednesday finished just two places above the Division One relegation zone and the only bright spot of the season was a run to the semi-finals of the League Cup.

== Final league table ==
Pos	Team	Pld	W	D	L	GF	GA	GD	Pts	Qualification or relegation
18	Walsall	46	13	12	21	51	71	−20	51	
19	Grimsby Town	46	12	14	20	50	72	−22	50	
20	Sheffield Wednesday	46	12	14	20	49	71	−22	50	
21	Rotherham United	46	10	19	17	52	66	−14	49	
22	Crewe Alexandra (R)	46	12	13	21	47	76	−29	49	Relegation to the Second Division

Rules for classification: 1) Points; 2) Goal difference; 3) Goals scored
(R) Relegated

== Results ==
Sheffield Wednesday's score comes first

=== Legend ===
Win	Draw	Loss

=== Football League First Division ===
Date	Outcome	Opponent	Venue	Result	Attendance	Scorers
12 August 2001	Loss	Burnley	H	0–2	21,766	
18 August 2001	Win	Crewe Alexandra	A	2–0	7,933	Sibon, McLaren
25 August 2001	Draw	West Bromwich Albion	H	1–1	18,844	Sibon
27 August 2001	Loss	Norwich City	A	0–2	16,820	
8 September 2001	Loss	Birmingham City	A	0–2	19,421	
15 September 2001	Draw	Wimbledon	A	1–1	7,348	T Johnson
17 September 2001	Draw	Bradford City	H	1–1	18,012	Di Piedi
22 September 2001	Loss	Manchester City	H	2–6	25,731	Bonvín, Bromby
25 September 2001	Draw	Rotherham United	A	1–1	8,474	Westwood
29 September 2001	Loss	Crystal Palace	A	1–4	17,066	T Johnson
7 October 2001	Draw	Sheffield United	H	0–0	29,281	
13 October 2001	Loss	Watford	A	1–3	14,456	T Johnson
16 October 2001	Loss	Preston North End	H	1–2	15,592	Sibon
20 October 2001	Win	Walsall	H	2–1	16,275	Sibon, Bonvín
24 October 2001	Win	Barnsley	H	3–1	21,008	Sibon, Bonvín (2)
27 October 2001	Loss	Coventry City	A	0–2	17,381	
31 October 2001	Win	Nottingham Forest	A	1–0	20,206	Morrison
3 November 2001	Loss	Portsmouth	H	2–3	18,212	Donnelly, Sibon (pen)
10 November 2001	Draw	Grimsby Town	H	0–0	17,507	
18 November 2001	Draw	Wolverhampton Wanderers	A	0–0	19,947	
24 November 2001	Win	Stockport County	H	5–0	17,365	Maddix, Sibon (pen), Morrison, Soltvedt, Ekoku
2 December 2001	Loss	Barnsley	A	0–3	16,714	
8 December 2001	Draw	Millwall	H	1–1	21,304	Ekoku
15 December 2001	Loss	Gillingham	A	1–2	8,586	Sibon (pen)
22 December 2001	Draw	West Bromwich Albion	A	1–1	20,340	Ekoku
26 December 2001	Loss	Birmingham City	H	0–1	24,335	
29 December 2001	Loss	Norwich City	H	0–5	19,205	
12 January 2002	Win	Crewe Alexandra	H	1–0	16,737	Sibon
19 January 2002	Win	Burnley	A	2–1	16,081	McLaren, Kuqi
29 January 2002	Draw	Sheffield United	A	0–0	29,364	
2 February 2002	Loss	Crystal Palace	H	1–3	20,099	Ekoku
5 February 2002	Loss	Preston North End	A	2–4	14,038	Quinn, Ekoku (pen)
9 February 2002	Win	Walsall	A	3–0	8,290	Ekoku, Kuqi, Sibon
16 February 2002	Win	Watford	H	2–1	18,244	Ekoku (pen), Kuqi
23 February 2002	Loss	Rotherham United	H	1–2	28,179	Kuqi
27 February 2002	Loss	Manchester City	A	0–4	33,682	
2 March 2002	Win	Bradford City	A	2–0	16,904	D Johnson, Kuqi
6 March 2002	Loss	Wimbledon	H	1–2	18,930	D Johnson
9 March 2002	Draw	Gillingham	H	0–0	20,361	
16 March 2002	Win	Millwall	A	2–1	13,074	Donnelly (2)
23 March 2002	Draw	Portsmouth	A	0–0	14,819	
29 March 2002	Win	Coventry City	H	2–1	21,470	Sibon (2)
1 April 2002	Draw	Grimsby Town	A	0–0	9,236	
6 April 2002	Loss	Nottingham Forest	H	0–2	21,782	
13 April 2002	Loss	Stockport County	A	1–3	8,706	Quinn
21 April 2002	Draw	Wolverhampton Wanderers	H	2–2	29,772	Donnelly, Kuqi

=== FA Cup ===
Round	Date	Outcome	Opponent	Venue	Result	Attendance	Goalscorers
R3	15 January 2002	Loss	Crewe Alexandra	A	1–2	6,271	Hamshaw

=== League Cup ===
Round	Date	Outcome	Opponent	Venue	Result	Attendance	Goalscorers
R1	21 August 2001	Win	Bury	A	3–1	3,129	Ekoku, Maddix, McLaren
R2	12 September 2001	Win	Sunderland	H	4–2 (a.e.t.)	12,074	Ekoku, Morrison (pen), Di Piedi, Bonvín
R3	10 October 2001	Win	Crystal Palace	H	2–2 (won 3–1 on pens)	8,796	Westwood, Crane
R4	28 November 2001	Win	Aston Villa	A	1–0	26,526	Ekoku
R5	19 December 2001	Win	Watford	H	4–0	20,319	Sibon, Hamshaw, O'Donnell, Soltvedt
SF First Leg	8 January 2002	Loss	Blackburn Rovers	H	1–2	30,883	Ekoku
SF Second Leg	22 January 2002	Loss	Blackburn Rovers	A	2–4 (lost 3–6 on agg)	26,844	Ekoku (pen), Soltvedt

== Squad ==
Note: Flags indicate national team as defined under FIFA eligibility rules; some limited exceptions apply. Players may hold more than one non-FIFA nationality.

No.	Pos.	Nation	Player
1	GK	ENG	Kevin Pressman
2	DF	ENG	Ian Hendon
3	DF	ENG	Andy Hinchcliffe
4	MF	ENG	Paul McLaren
5	DF	ENG	Leigh Bromby
6	MF	NOR	Trond Egil Soltvedt (captain)
7	MF	IRL	Alan Quinn
8	FW	NED	Gerald Sibon
9	FW	NGR	Efan Ekoku
10	FW	ARG	Pablo Facundo Bonvín (on loan from Boca Juniors)
11	FW	NIR	Owen Morrison
12	DF	ENG	Steve Haslam
13	GK	ENG	Chris Stringer
14	DF	ENG	Marlon Broomes
15	DF	ENG	Steve Harkness
16	MF	ENG	Matt Hamshaw
17	FW	ITA	Michele Di Piedi
18	MF	SCO	Simon Donnelly
19	FW	ENG	Adam Muller

No.	Pos.	Nation	Player
20	MF	ENG	Tony Crane
21	DF	ENG	Ashley Westwood
22	DF	IRL	Derek Geary
23	MF	SCO	Philip Scott
24	MF	SCO	Phil O'Donnell
25	DF	ENG	Danny Maddix
26	FW	ENG	Jon Shaw
27	MF	ENG	Laurie Wilson
28	FW	FIN	Shefki Kuqi
29	FW	SCO	Kevin Gallacher
30	GK	RSA	Sean Roberts
31	GK	ENG	Paul Heald (on loan from Wimbledon)
32	MF	WAL	Neil Gibson
34	DF	ENG	Craig Armstrong
35	DF	ENG	David Burrows
36	GK	ENG	Richard Siddall
37	MF	NIR	Jon McCarthy (on loan from Birmingham City)
-	DF	ENG	Craig Rand

=== Left club during season ===
Note: Flags indicate national team as defined under FIFA eligibility rules; some limited exceptions apply. Players may hold more than one non-FIFA nationality.

No.	Pos.	Nation	Player
37	DF	ENG	Tom Staniforth (Deceased)
26	MF	ENG	Carlton Palmer (on loan from Coventry City)
14	MF	ENG	Aaron Lescott (to Stockport County)
27	FW	ENG	Tommy Johnson (to Kilmarnock)

No.	Pos.	Nation	Player
26	MF	ENG	Dean Windass (on loan from Middlesbrough)
28	MF	SWE	Bojan Djordjic (on loan from Manchester United)
33	FW	JAM	David Johnson (on loan from Nottingham Forest)

=== Reserve squad ===
Note: Flags indicate national team as defined under FIFA eligibility rules; some limited exceptions apply. Players may hold more than one non-FIFA nationality.

No.	Pos.	Nation	Player
—	MF	IRL	Alan Cawley
—	DF	ENG	Calem Connolly
—	FW	CGO	Carlin Itonga (on loan from Arsenal)
—	FW	ENG	Dene Cropper
—	MF	ENG	Stephen Santry

No.	Pos.	Nation	Player
—	FW	ENG	Matt Shaw
—	DF	ENG	Anwar Uddin
—	MF	ENG	Michael Williams
—	DF	ENG	Greg Young
