= Sean Roberts =

Sean Roberts may refer to:

- Sean Roberts (footballer) (born 1983), South African football goalkeeper
- Sean Roberts (cricketer) (1968–2017), New Zealand cricketer
- Sean Roberts (Oklahoma politician), American member of the Oklahoma House of Representatives
- Sean Roberts, pseudonym of Yuri Lowenthal (born 1971), American voice actor

== See also ==
- Shaun Roberts (Guardians of Time Trilogy), a character in the novels by Marianne Curley
- Shawn Roberts (born 1984), Canadian actor
