= 2016–17 FA Cup =

Football Association Challenge Cup

Tournament details
- Country: England; Guernsey; Wales
- Dates: 5 August – 19 October 2016 (qualifying competition); 4 November 2016 – 27 May 2017 (main competition)
- Teams: 736 (overall); 644 (qualifying competition); 124 (main competition)

Final positions
- Champions: Arsenal (13th title)
- Runners-up: Chelsea

Tournament statistics
- Matches played: 156
- Goals scored: 490 (3.14 per match)
- Attendance: 1,977,797 (12,678 per match)
- Top goal scorer(s): Adam Morgan; Son Heung-min (6 goals each)
- (Note: All statistics do not include qualifying play-offs)

The 2016–17 FA Cup (also known as the FA Challenge Cup) was the 136th edition of the oldest recognised football tournament in the world. It was sponsored by Emirates, and known as the Emirates FA Cup for sponsorship purposes. 736 clubs were accepted into the tournament, and it began with the extra preliminary round on 6 August 2016, and concluded with the final on 27 May 2017. The winner qualified for the 2017–18 UEFA Europa League group stage.

Premier League side Manchester United were the defending champions, but were eliminated in the quarter-finals by Chelsea.

Arsenal won a record-breaking 13th title following a 2–1 win over Chelsea in the final, winning their third FA Cup in 4 seasons.

The tournament was also notable for the performance of Lincoln City from Level 5, who became the first non-league club to reach the quarter-finals since 1914.

This edition of the FA Cup was the first in which quarter-final matches were played to a result on the day, instead of being subject to replay in case of a draw. However, all four matches were settled without the need for extra time.

== Teams ==
Round	Clubs remaining	Clubs involved	Winners from previous round	New entries this round	Leagues entering at this round
First round proper	124	80	32	48	EFL League One; EFL League Two
Second round proper	84	40	40	none	none
Third round proper	64	64	20	44	Premier League; EFL Championship
Fourth round proper	32	32	32	none	none
Fifth round proper	16	16	16	none	none
Quarter-finals	8	8	8	none	none
Semi-finals	4	4	4	none	none
Final	2	2	2	none	none

== Prize fund ==
Round	No. of Clubs receive fund	Prize fund per club
Extra preliminary round winners	184	£1,500
Preliminary round winners	160	£1,925
First round qualifying winners	116	£3,000
Second round qualifying winners	80	£4,500
Third round qualifying winners	40	£7,500
Fourth round qualifying winners	32	£12,500
First round proper winners	40	£18,000
Second round proper winners	20	£27,000
Third round proper winners	32	£67,500
Fourth round proper winners	16	£90,000
Fifth round proper winners	8	£180,000
Quarter-final winners	4	£360,000
Semi-final losers	2	£450,000
Semi-final winners	2	£900,000
Final runners-up	1	£900,000
Final winner	1	£1,800,000
Total		£15,132,000

== Round and draw dates ==
The schedule was as follows.

Phase	Round	Draw date	Match date
Qualifying rounds	Extra preliminary round	8 July 2016	6 August 2016
Qualifying rounds	Preliminary round	8 July 2016	20 August 2016
Qualifying rounds	First round qualifying	15 August 2016	3 September 2016
Qualifying rounds	Second round qualifying	5 September 2016	17 September 2016
Qualifying rounds	Third round qualifying	19 September 2016	1 October 2016
Qualifying rounds	Fourth round qualifying	3 October 2016	15 October 2016
Main tournament	First round proper	17 October 2016	5 November 2016
Main tournament	Second round proper	7 November 2016	3 December 2016
Main tournament	Third round proper	5 December 2016	7 January 2017
Main tournament	Fourth round proper	9 January 2017	28 January 2017
Main tournament	Fifth round proper	30 January 2017	18 February 2017
Main tournament	Quarter-finals	19 February 2017	11 March 2017
Main tournament	Semi-finals	13 March 2017	22 and 23 April 2017
Main tournament	Final	13 March 2017	27 May 2017

== Qualifying rounds ==
All teams that entered the competition, but were not members of the Premier League or The Football League, competed in the qualifying rounds to secure one of 32 places available in the first round proper. The qualifying competition began with the extra preliminary round on 6 August 2016, with the final (fourth) qualifying round played over the weekend of 15 October.

The winners from the fourth qualifying round were Southport, Alfreton Town, Macclesfield Town, FC Halifax Town, Stockport County, Barrow, Altrincham, Stourbridge, Lincoln City, Curzon Ashton, Spennymoor Town, Westfields, Stamford, Chesham United, Whitehawk, Sutton United, Dagenham & Redbridge, Taunton Town, Woking, Braintree Town, Dartford, St Albans City, Brackley Town, Eastbourne Borough, Harrow Borough, Boreham Wood, Maidstone United, Kidderminster Harriers, Solihull Moors, Dover Athletic, Merstham and Eastleigh.

Westfields, Stamford and Merstham were appearing in the competition proper for the first time. Solihull Moors was also appearing at this stage for the time since the 2007 merger of Solihull Borough and Moor Green, who had last featured in the first round in 1997-98 and 2002-03 respectively. Of the others, Curzon Ashton and Eastbourne Borough had last reached the first round in 2008-09, Taunton Town had last done so in 1981-82 and Spennymoor Town had last done so in 1956-57 when the club was still known as Evenwood Town. Defunct rivals Spennymoor United had last appeared at this stage in 1995-96.

== First round proper ==
The first round draw took place on 17 October and was broadcast live on BBC Two and BT Sport. All 40 first round proper ties were played on the weekend of 5 November. 32 teams from the qualifying competition joined the 48 teams from League One and League Two to compete in this round. The round included one team from Level 9 still in the competition, Westfields, who were the lowest-ranked team in this round.

4 November 2016	Millwall (3)	1–0	Southend United (3)	London
19:45	Romeo 88'	Report		Stadium: The Den; Attendance: 4,502; Referee: James Linington

4 November 2016	Eastleigh (5)	1–1	Swindon Town (3)	Eastleigh
19:55	Mandron 64'	Report	Doughty 69' (pen.)	Stadium: Ten Acres; Attendance: 3,312; Referee: Oliver Langford

15 November 2016 Replay	Swindon Town (3)	1–3	Eastleigh (5)	Swindon
19:45	Delfouneso 79'	Report	Reason 16'; Drury 35'; Mandron 74' (pen.)	Stadium: County Ground; Attendance: 4,321; Referee: Chris Sarginson

5 November 2016	Merstham (7)	0–5	Oxford United (3)	Merstham
12:30		Report	MacDonald 12'; Ruffels 45'; Hemmings 62', 90'; Roberts 63'	Stadium: Moatside Stadium; Attendance: 1,920; Referee: John Brooks

5 November 2016	Dagenham & Redbridge (5)	0–0	FC Halifax Town (6)	London
15:00		Report		Stadium: Victoria Road; Attendance: 1,387; Referee: Neil Hair

15 November 2016 Replay	FC Halifax Town (6)	2–1	Dagenham & Redbridge (5)	Halifax
19:45	Denton 35'; Kosylo 90'	Report	Whitely 73'	Stadium: The Shay; Attendance: 1,465; Referee: Thomas Bramall

5 November 2016	Yeovil Town (4)	2–2	Solihull Moors (5)	Yeovil
15:00	Hedges 8'; Khan 52'	Report	Byrne 57', 63'	Stadium: Huish Park; Attendance: 2,118; Referee: David Rock

15 November 2016 Replay	Solihull Moors (5)	1–1 (a.e.t.) (4–2 p)	Yeovil Town (4)	Solihull
19:45	Asante 99' (pen.)	Report	Zoko 93'	Stadium: Damson Park; Attendance: 1,460; Referee: Carl Boyeson
	Penalties
	Byrne (penalty scored); Jones (penalty scored); Gough (penalty scored); Sterling-James (penalty scored)		(penalty missed) Dickson; (penalty scored) Dawson; (penalty missed) Eaves; (penalty scored) Zoko

5 November 2016	Stockport County (6)	2–4	Woking (5)	Stockport
15:00	Ball 9', 45'	Report	Jones 18'; Ugwu 32', 59'; Saraiva 90+2'	Stadium: Edgeley Park; Attendance: 4,025; Referee: Thomas Bramall

5 November 2016	Dartford (6)	3–6	Sutton United (5)	Dartford
15:00	Bradbrook 5', 17' (pen.); Ofori-Acheampong 51'	Report	Biamou 1', 23'; Deacon 15', 71'; Stearn 58', 90+4'	Stadium: Princes Park; Attendance: 1,689; Referee: Sam Allison

5 November 2016	Walsall (3)	0–1	Macclesfield Town (5)	Walsall
15:00		Report	McCombe 23'	Stadium: Bescot Stadium; Attendance: 2,334; Referee: Brett Huxtable

5 November 2016	Port Vale (3)	1–0	Stevenage (4)	Stoke-on-Trent
15:00	Streete 38'	Report		Stadium: Vale Park; Attendance: 3,093; Referee: Mark Haywood

5 November 2016	Northampton Town (3)	6–0	Harrow Borough (7)	Northampton
15:00	Anderson 6'; Richards 11', 54'; O'Toole 70'; Taylor 82'; Hooper 90+2'	Report		Stadium: Sixfields Stadium; Attendance: 3,406; Referee: Ross Joyce

5 November 2016	Cambridge United (4)	1–1	Dover Athletic (5)	Cambridge
15:00	Mingoia 38'	Report	Miller 82'	Stadium: Abbey Stadium; Attendance: 2,620; Referee: Nick Kinseley

17 November 2016 Replay	Dover Athletic (5)	2–4 (a.e.t.)	Cambridge United (4)	Dover
19:45	Miller 70'; Thomas 102'	Report	Roberts 90+2'; Legge 110'; Elito 118'; Williamson 120+1'	Stadium: Crabble Athletic Ground; Attendance: 1,158; Referee: Charles Breakspear

5 November 2016	Westfields (9)	1–1	Curzon Ashton (6)	Hereford
15:00	Jones 9' (pen.)	Report	Morgan 81'	Stadium: allpay.park Attendance: 1,178; Referee: Tom Nield

14 November 2016 Replay	Curzon Ashton (6)	3–1	Westfields (9)	Ashton-under-Lyne
19:45	Morgan 23', 34'; Cummins 70'	Report	Harrhy 90+3'	Stadium: Tameside Stadium; Attendance: 1,075; Referee: Anthony Backhouse

5 November 2016	Milton Keynes Dons (3)	3–2	Spennymoor Town (7)	Milton Keynes
15:00	Reeves 8'; Thomas-Asante 12'; Agard 14'	Report	Tait 19'; Johnson 84'	Stadium: Stadium mk Attendance: 4,099; Referee: Constantine Hatzidakis

5 November 2016	Gillingham (3)	2–2	Brackley Town (6)	Gillingham
15:00	Nouble 28', 45'	Report	Gudger 13'; Armson 27'	Stadium: Priestfield Stadium; Attendance: 2,410; Referee: Brendan Malone

16 November 2016 Replay	Brackley Town (6)	4–3 (a.e.t.)	Gillingham (3)	Brackley
19:45	Armson 17', 26', 105'; Nelson 96' (o.g.)	Report	Hessenthaler 36'; Wagstaff 67'; McDonald 113'	Stadium: St. James Park; Attendance: 1,654; Referee: Robert Jones

5 November 2016	Portsmouth (4)	1–2	Wycombe Wanderers (4)	Portsmouth
15:00	Evans 47'	Report	Cowan-Hall 27'; Akinfenwa 84'	Stadium: Fratton Park; Attendance: 8,130; Referee: Gavin Ward

5 November 2016	Bury (3)	2–2	AFC Wimbledon (3)	Bury
15:00	Hope 27', 29'	Report	Taylor 61'; Elliott 67'	Stadium: Gigg Lane; Attendance: 2,346; Referee: Jeremy Simpson

15 November 2016 Replay	AFC Wimbledon (3)	5–0	Bury (3)	Kingston upon Thames
19:45	Robinson 27'; Parrett 32'; Poleon 45+2', 72'; Taylor 80'	Report		Stadium: Kingsmeadow; Attendance: 2,316; Referee: John Brooks

5 November 2016	Mansfield Town (4)	1–2	Plymouth Argyle (4)	Mansfield
15:00	Hemmings 58'	Report	Slew 14'; Fox 80'	Stadium: Field Mill; Attendance: 2,318; Referee: Dean Whitestone

5 November 2016	Braintree Town (5)	7–0	Eastbourne Borough (6)	Braintree
15:00	Patterson 6'; Elokobi 11', 83'; Muldoon 21'; Barnard 68', 74' (pen.); Akinola 88'	Report		Stadium: Cressing Road; Attendance: 645; Referee: Stephen Ross

5 November 2016	Bolton Wanderers (3)	1–0	Grimsby Town (4)	Bolton
15:00	Trotter 20'	Report		Stadium: Macron Stadium; Attendance: 6,649; Referee: Trevor Kettle

5 November 2016	Bradford City (3)	1–2	Accrington Stanley (4)	Bradford
15:00	Conneely 72' (o.g.)	Report	Boco 30'; Clark 80'	Stadium: Valley Parade; Attendance: 4,985; Referee: Graham Salisbury

5 November 2016	Oldham Athletic (3)	2–1	Doncaster Rovers (4)	Oldham
15:00	Flynn 45+1'; Mckay 53'	Report	Mandeville 90+4' (pen.)	Stadium: Boundary Park; Attendance: 2,984; Referee: David Webb

5 November 2016	Shrewsbury Town (3)	3–0	Barnet (4)	Shrewsbury
15:00	Sadler 27'; Leitch-Smith 32'; Grimmer 57'	Report		Stadium: New Meadow; Attendance: 3,120; Referee: Ben Toner

5 November 2016	Crawley Town (4)	1–1	Bristol Rovers (3)	Crawley
15:00	Clifford 35'	Report	Brown 15'	Stadium: Broadfield Stadium; Attendance: 2,281; Referee: Darren Deadman

15 November 2016 Replay	Bristol Rovers (3)	4–2 (a.e.t.)	Crawley Town (4)	Bristol
19:45	Taylor 34', 102' (pen.); Gaffney 52', 96'	Report	Roberts 45+1'; Harrold 65'	Stadium: Memorial Stadium; Attendance: 3,676; Referee: Ben Toner

5 November 2016	Whitehawk (6)	1–1	Stourbridge (7)	Brighton
15:00	Southam 12'	Report	Scarr 52'	Stadium: The Enclosed Ground; Attendance: 767; Referee: Robert Whitton

14 November 2016 Replay	Stourbridge (7)	3–0	Whitehawk (6)	Amblecote
19:45	Lait 51'; Benbow 60', 76'	Report		Stadium: War Memorial Athletic Ground; Attendance: 1,993; Referee: Tom Nield

5 November 2016	Colchester United (4)	1–2	Chesterfield (3)	Colchester
15:00	Fosu 46'	Report	O'Shea 23'; Evans 50'	Stadium: Colchester Community Stadium; Attendance: 1,840; Referee: Lee Probert

5 November 2016	Lincoln City (5)	2–1	Altrincham (6)	Lincoln
15:00	Raggett 21'; Power 59'	Report	Cyrus 75'	Stadium: Sincil Bank; Attendance: 3,529; Referee: Steven Rushton

5 November 2016	Exeter City (4)	1–3	Luton Town (4)	Exeter
15:00	Reid 39'	Report	Hylton 11' (pen.), 86' (pen.); Rea 71'	Stadium: St James Park; Attendance: 2,972; Referee: John Busby

5 November 2016	Charlton Athletic (3)	3–1	Scunthorpe United (3)	London
15:00	Lookman 34', 83'; Jackson 40'	Report	Hopper 52'	Stadium: The Valley; Attendance: 4,123; Referee: Chris Sarginson

5 November 2016	Cheltenham Town (4)	1–1	Crewe Alexandra (4)	Cheltenham
15:00	Waters 58'	Report	Jones 73'	Stadium: Whaddon Road; Attendance: 2,880; Referee: Michael Salisbury

15 November 2016 Replay	Crewe Alexandra (4)	1–4	Cheltenham Town (4)	Crewe
19:45	Lowe 64'	Report	Pell 19'; Barthram 36'; Waters 52'; Holman 61'	Stadium: Gresty Road; Attendance: 1,711; Referee: Seb Stockbridge

5 November 2016	Peterborough United (3)	2–1	Chesham United (7)	Peterborough
15:00	Coulthirst 40', 70'	Report	Blake 80'	Stadium: ABAX Stadium; Attendance: 4,328; Referee: Darren Handley

6 November 2016	Taunton Town (8)	2–2	Barrow (5)	Taunton
14:00	Wright 14'; Villis 37'	Report	Harrison 35' (pen.); Bennett 43'	Stadium: Wordsworth Drive; Attendance: 2,297; Referee: Craig Hicks

15 November 2016 Replay	Barrow (5)	2–1	Taunton Town (8)	Barrow-in-Furness
19:45	Williams 48'; Yates 75'	Report	Palmer 73'	Stadium: Holker Street; Attendance: 1,717; Referee: Martin Coy

6 November 2016	Sheffield United (3)	6–0	Leyton Orient (4)	Sheffield
14:00	Basham 23'; Scougall 39'; Freeman 45'; Chapman 54', 69', 90+2'	Report		Stadium: Bramall Lane; Attendance: 6,099; Referee: Nigel Miller

6 November 2016	Alfreton Town (6)	1–1	Newport County (4)	Alfreton
14:00	Kennedy 74'	Report	Sheehan 65'	Stadium: North Street stadium Attendance: 1,109; Referee: Graham Horwood

15 November 2016 Replay	Newport County (4)	4–1 (a.e.t.)	Alfreton Town (6)	Newport
19:45	Healey 68'; Green 97'; Sheehan 110'; Barnum-Bobb 117'	Report	Priestley 74'	Stadium: Rodney Parade; Attendance: 1,189; Referee: Brett Huxtable

6 November 2016	Maidstone United (5)	1–1	Rochdale (3)	Maidstone
14:00	Taylor 21' (pen.)	Report	Camps 90+4'	Stadium: Gallagher Stadium; Attendance: 2,227; Referee: Charles Breakspear

15 November 2016 Replay	Rochdale (3)	2–0	Maidstone United (5)	Rochdale
19:45	Davies 14', 22' (pen.)	Report		Stadium: Spotland Stadium; Attendance: 1,350; Referee: Nigel Miller

6 November 2016	St Albans City (6)	3–5	Carlisle United (4)	St Albans
14:00	Morias 4', 65'; Theophanous 86'	Report	Grainger 20' (pen.); Kennedy 57'; Ibehre 71', 81'; Lambe 83'	Stadium: Clarence Park; Attendance: 3,473; Referee: Simon Hooper

6 November 2016	Boreham Wood (5)	2–2	Notts County (4)	Borehamwood
14:00	Ferrier 31'; Balanta 50'	Report	Campbell 60', 83'	Stadium: Meadow Park; Attendance: 1,201; Referee: Mark Heywood

15 November 2016 Replay	Notts County (4)	2–0	Boreham Wood (5)	Nottingham
19:45	Forte 24'; Collins 90+5'	Report		Stadium: Meadow Lane; Attendance: 1,762; Referee: Richard Clark

6 November 2016	Hartlepool United (4)	3–0	Stamford (8)	Hartlepool
14:00	Deverdics 65'; Gordon 82' (o.g.); Paynter 85'	Report		Stadium: Victoria Park; Attendance: 2,461; Referee: Anthony Backhouse

6 November 2016	Morecambe (4)	1–1	Coventry City (3)	Morecambe
14:00	Winnard 59'	Report	Sterry 72'	Stadium: Globe Arena; Attendance: 1,732; Referee: Andy Haines

15 November 2016 Replay	Coventry City (3)	2–1	Morecambe (4)	Coventry
19:45	Sordell 39', 57'	Report	Winnard 10'	Stadium: Ricoh Arena; Attendance: 2,175; Referee: Mark Haywood

6 November 2016	Blackpool (4)	2–0	Kidderminster Harriers (6)	Blackpool
14:00	Matt 27'; Potts 37'	Report		Stadium: Bloomfield Road; Attendance: 1,963; Referee: Martin Coy

7 November 2016	Southport (5)	0–0	Fleetwood Town (3)	Southport
19:45		Report		Stadium: Haig Avenue; Attendance: 2,265; Referee: Darren England

15 November 2016 Replay	Fleetwood Town (3)	4–1 (a.e.t.)	Southport (5)	Fleetwood
19:45	Amadi-Holloway 34'; Bolger 94'; Hunter 96'; Bell 101'	Report	Grimes 87'	Stadium: Highbury Stadium; Attendance: 1,609; Referee: David Webb

== Second round proper ==
The second round draw took place on 7 November at Haig Avenue, home of Southport F.C., immediately prior to the Southport-Fleetwood tie, and was broadcast live on BT Sport. The round included one team from Level 7 still in the competition, Stourbridge, who were the lowest-ranked team in this round.

2 December 2016	Macclesfield Town (5)	0–0	Oxford United (3)	Macclesfield
19:55		Report		Stadium: Moss Rose; Attendance: 2,566; Referee: Seb Stockbridge

13 December 2016 Replay	Oxford United (3)	3–0	Macclesfield Town (5)	Oxford
19:45	Taylor 10'; Rothwell 47'; Hemmings 78'	Report		Stadium: Kassam Stadium; Attendance: 3,642; Referee: Carl Boyeson

3 December 2016	Chesterfield (3)	0–5	Wycombe Wanderers (4)	Chesterfield
15:00		Report	Hayes 21'; Kashket 24', 70', 77'; Stewart 74'	Stadium: Proact Stadium; Attendance: 3,685; Referee: Michael Salisbury

3 December 2016	Blackpool (4)	1–0	Brackley Town (6)	Blackpool
15:00	Matt 6'	Report		Stadium: Bloomfield Road; Attendance: 1,764; Referee: Ross Joyce

3 December 2016	Luton Town (4)	6–2	Solihull Moors (5)	Luton
15:00	Hylton 51'; Mullins 54'; O'Donnell 59', 89'; Marriott 63', 90+2'	Report	Osborne 5', 35'	Stadium: Kenilworth Road; Attendance: 3,512; Referee: Chris Sarginson

3 December 2016	Sutton United (5)	2–1	Cheltenham Town (4)	London
15:00	Tubbs 46'; Deacon 90+6'	Report	Wright 35'	Stadium: Gander Green Lane; Attendance: 2,224; Referee: Robert Jones

3 December 2016	Shrewsbury Town (3)	0–0	Fleetwood Town (3)	Shrewsbury
15:00		Report		Stadium: New Meadow; Attendance: 2,886; Referee: Trevor Kettle

13 December 2016 Replay	Fleetwood Town (3)	3–2	Shrewsbury Town (3)	Fleetwood
19:45	Cole 63', 77'; Hunter 90+5'	Report	O'Brien 43'; Dodds 60'	Stadium: Highbury Stadium; Attendance: 1,157; Referee: Mark Heywood

3 December 2016	Charlton Athletic (3)	0–0	Milton Keynes Dons (3)	London
15:00		Report		Stadium: The Valley; Attendance: 4,982; Referee: Darren England

13 December 2016 Replay	Milton Keynes Dons (3)	3–1 (a.e.t.)	Charlton Athletic (3)	Milton Keynes
19:45	Powell 6'; Reeves 94'; Bowditch 97'	Report	Chicksen 24'	Stadium: Stadium mk Attendance: 3,655; Referee: Robert Jones

3 December 2016	Plymouth Argyle (4)	0–0	Newport County (4)	Plymouth
15:00		Report		Stadium: Home Park; Attendance: 5,071; Referee: John Brooks

21 December 2016 Replay	Newport County (4)	0–1 (a.e.t.)	Plymouth Argyle (4)	Newport
19:45		Report	Carey 113' (pen.)	Stadium: Rodney Parade; Attendance: 5,121; Referee: Dean Whitestone

3 December 2016	Carlisle United (4)	0–2	Rochdale (3)	Carlisle
15:00		Report	Davies 48'; Mendez-Laing 90+3'	Stadium: Brunton Park; Attendance: 4,426; Referee: Mark Haywood

4 December 2016	Curzon Ashton (6)	3–4	AFC Wimbledon (3)	Ashton-under-Lyne
12:00	Morgan 1', 21', 62'	Report	Elliott 80', 90+4'; Poleon 81'; Barnett 82'	Stadium: Tameside Stadium; Attendance: 1,731; Referee: James Adcock

4 December 2016	Millwall (3)	5–2	Braintree Town (5)	London
14:00	Smith 17', 21', 48'; Ferguson 25'; O'Brien 90+4'	Report	Cheek 16'; Midson 34'	Stadium: The Den; Attendance: 3,345; Referee: Darren Deadman

4 December 2016	Bolton Wanderers (3)	3–2	Sheffield United (3)	Bolton
14:00	Madine 44'; Ameobi 46'; Vela 84'	Report	Coutts 64'; O'Connell 86'	Stadium: Macron Stadium; Attendance: 7,027; Referee: Lee Probert

4 December 2016	Notts County (4)	2–2	Peterborough United (3)	Nottingham
14:00	Campbell 42'; Laing 90+4'	Report	Da Silva Lopes 3'; Edwards 15'	Stadium: Meadow Lane; Attendance: 3,940; Referee: Ben Toner

20 December 2016 Replay	Peterborough United (3)	2–0	Notts County (4)	Peterborough
19:45	Edwards 2'; Taylor 8'	Report		Stadium: ABAX Stadium; Attendance: 7,796; Referee: Darren England

4 December 2016	Cambridge United (4)	4–0	Coventry City (3)	Cambridge
14:00	Berry 7', 29' (pen.), 38', 86'	Report		Stadium: Abbey Stadium; Attendance: 4,283; Referee: Keith Stroud

4 December 2016	Bristol Rovers (3)	1–2	Barrow (5)	Bristol
14:00	Gaffney 10'	Report	Harrison 16', 61'	Stadium: Memorial Stadium; Attendance: 4,570; Referee: Dean Whitestone

4 December 2016	Woking (5)	0–3	Accrington Stanley (4)	Woking
14:00		Report	Kee 34', 42'; O'Sullivan 61'	Stadium: Kingfield Stadium; Attendance: 3,718; Referee: Nick Kinseley

4 December 2016	Eastleigh (5)	3–3	FC Halifax Town (6)	Eastleigh
14:00	Mandron 18', 90'; Wilson 74'	Report	Sinnott 62'; Garner 67'; Peniket 72'	Stadium: Ten Acres; Attendance: 2,098; Referee: Brendan Malone

13 December 2016 Replay	FC Halifax Town (6)	0–2	Eastleigh (5)	Halifax
19:45		Report	Wilson 43'; Mandron 45+2' (pen.)	Stadium: The Shay; Attendance: 1,539; Referee: Richard Clark

4 December 2016	Port Vale (3)	4–0	Hartlepool United (4)	Stoke-on-Trent
15:00	Cicilia 12'; Carroll 14' (o.g.); Jones 31'; Taylor 56' (pen.)	Report		Stadium: Vale Park; Attendance: 3,514; Referee: Darren Handley

5 December 2016	Lincoln City (5)	3–2	Oldham Athletic (3)	Lincoln
19:45	Robinson 22', 47'; Hawkridge 24'	Report	Clarke 70'; Mckay 73'	Stadium: Sincil Bank; Attendance: 7,012; Referee: Gavin Ward

13 December 2016 (Note: The match on 4 December 2016 between Stourbridge and Northampton Town was postponed due to a frozen pitch. The match was later rearranged for 13 December 2016.)	Stourbridge (7)	1–0	Northampton Town (3)	Stourbridge
19:45	Duggan 86'	Report		Stadium: War Memorial Athletic Ground; Attendance: 2,520; Referee: Andy Davies

== Third round proper ==
A total of 64 clubs played in the third round; 20 winners of the second round, and 44 teams from Premier League and EFL Championship entering in this round. The draw was held on 5 December 2016 at the BT Tower and was broadcast live on BT Sport and BBC Two. The matches were played across the weekend of 6–9 January 2017. The round included five non-league teams, including Stourbridge, who were still the lowest-ranked team in the competition.

6 January 2017	West Ham United (1)	0–5	Manchester City (1)	Stratford, London
19:55 GMT		Report	Touré 33' (pen.); Nordtveit 41' (o.g.); Silva 43'; Agüero 50'; Stones 84'	Stadium: London Stadium; Attendance: 56,975; Referee: Michael Oliver

7 January 2017	Manchester United (1)	4–0	Reading (2)	Old Trafford, Greater Manchester
12:30 GMT	Rooney 7'; Martial 15'; Rashford 75', 79'	Report		Stadium: Old Trafford; Attendance: 74,396; Referee: Andre Marriner

7 January 2017	Ipswich Town (2)	2–2	Lincoln City (5)	Ipswich
15:00 GMT	Lawrence 12', 86'	Report	Robinson 7', 65'	Stadium: Portman Road; Attendance: 16,027; Referee: Lee Probert

17 January 2017 Replay	Lincoln City (5)	1–0	Ipswich Town (2)	Lincoln
20:05 GMT	Arnold 90+1'	Report		Stadium: Sincil Bank; Attendance: 9,054; Referee: Ben Toner

7 January 2017	Barrow (5)	0–2	Rochdale (3)	Barrow-in-Furness
15:00 GMT		Report	Henderson 17', 62'	Stadium: Holker Street; Attendance: 4,414; Referee: David Webb

7 January 2017	Hull City (1)	2–0	Swansea City (1)	Kingston upon Hull
15:00 GMT	Hernández 78'; Tymon 90+3'	Report		Stadium: KCOM Stadium; Attendance: 6,608; Referee: Anthony Taylor

7 January 2017	Sunderland (1)	0–0	Burnley (1)	Sunderland
15:00 GMT		Report		Stadium: Stadium of Light; Attendance: 17,632; Referee: Stuart Attwell

17 January 2017 Replay	Burnley (1)	2–0	Sunderland (1)	Burnley
19:45 GMT	Vokes 44'; Gray 83'	Report		Stadium: Turf Moor; Attendance: 12,257; Referee: Mike Jones

7 January 2017	Queens Park Rangers (2)	1–2	Blackburn Rovers (2)	Shepherd's Bush, London
15:00 GMT	Bidwell 61' (pen.)	Report	Lynch 8' (o.g.); Feeney 58'	Stadium: Loftus Road; Attendance: 7,482; Referee: Simon Hooper

7 January 2017	Millwall (3)	3–0	Bournemouth (1)	Bermondsey, London
15:00 GMT	Morison 26'; Cummings 49'; Ferguson 90+3'	Report		Stadium: The Den; Attendance: 9,471; Referee: Andrew Madley

7 January 2017	Brighton & Hove Albion (2)	2–0	Milton Keynes Dons (3)	Falmer, Brighton and Hove
15:00 GMT	Kayal 9'; Hemed 72'	Report		Stadium: Falmer Stadium; Attendance: 11,091; Referee: James Linington

7 January 2017	Blackpool (4)	0–0	Barnsley (2)	Blackpool
15:00 GMT		Report		Stadium: Bloomfield Road; Attendance: 4,875; Referee: Chris Sarginson

17 January 2017 Replay	Barnsley (2)	1–2 (a.e.t.)	Blackpool (4)	Barnsley
19:45 GMT	MacDonald 49'	Report	Mellor 30'; Osayi-Samuel 120+1'	Stadium: Oakwell; Attendance: 5,558; Referee: Roger East

7 January 2017	Wigan Athletic (2)	2–0	Nottingham Forest (2)	Wigan
15:00 GMT	Grigg 45+2'; Wildschut 57'	Report		Stadium: DW Stadium; Attendance: 5,163; Referee: Oliver Langford

7 January 2017	Birmingham City (2)	1–1	Newcastle United (2)	Birmingham
15:00 GMT	Jutkiewicz 42'	Report	Murphy 5'	Stadium: St Andrews; Attendance: 13,171; Referee: Neil Swarbrick

18 January 2017 Replay	Newcastle United (2)	3–1	Birmingham City (2)	Newcastle upon Tyne
19:45 GMT	Ritchie 9' (pen.), 90+2'; Gouffran 34'	Report	Cotterill 71'	Stadium: St James' Park; Attendance: 34,896; Referee: Lee Probert

7 January 2017	West Bromwich Albion (1)	1–2	Derby County (2)	West Bromwich
15:00 GMT	Phillips 35'	Report	Bent 51'; Ince 54'	Stadium: The Hawthorns; Attendance: 25,288; Referee: Jon Moss

7 January 2017	Everton (1)	1–2	Leicester City (1)	Liverpool
15:00 GMT	Lukaku 63'	Report	Musa 66', 71'	Stadium: Goodison Park; Attendance: 35,493; Referee: Martin Atkinson

7 January 2017	Wycombe Wanderers (4)	2–1	Stourbridge (7)	High Wycombe
15:00 GMT	Wood 47'; Akinfenwa 83'	Report	Scarr 70'	Stadium: Adams Park; Attendance: 6,312; Referee: Darren England

7 January 2017	Watford (1)	2–0	Burton Albion (2)	Watford
15:00 GMT	Kabasele 21'; Sinclair 77'	Report		Stadium: Vicarage Road; Attendance: 13,270; Referee: Lee Mason

7 January 2017	Stoke City (1)	0–2	Wolverhampton Wanderers (2)	Stoke-on-Trent
15:00 GMT		Report	Costa 29'; Doherty 80'	Stadium: bet365 Stadium; Attendance: 21,479; Referee: Mike Jones

7 January 2017	Bristol City (2)	0–0	Fleetwood Town (3)	Bristol
15:00 GMT		Report		Stadium: Ashton Gate Stadium; Attendance: 10,301; Referee: Stephen Martin

17 January 2017 Replay	Fleetwood Town (3)	0–1	Bristol City (2)	Fleetwood
19:45 GMT		Report	Paterson 17'	Stadium: Highbury Stadium; Attendance: 2,115; Referee: Carl Boyeson

7 January 2017	Huddersfield Town (2)	4–0	Port Vale (3)	Huddersfield
15:00 GMT	Payne 28', 84'; Palmer 73'; Bunn 80'	Report		Stadium: Kirklees Stadium; Attendance: 11,715; Referee: Geoff Eltringham

7 January 2017	Brentford (2)	5–1	Eastleigh (5)	Brentford, London
15:00 GMT	Barbet 9' (pen.); Field 17', 38'; Vibe 23'; Sawyers 45+2'	Report	Obileye 29'	Stadium: Griffin Park; Attendance: 7,537; Referee: Peter Bankes

7 January 2017	Bolton Wanderers (3)	0–0	Crystal Palace (1)	Horwich, Bolton
15:00 GMT		Report		Stadium: Macron Stadium; Attendance: 11,683; Referee: Roger East

17 January 2017 Replay	Crystal Palace (1)	2–1	Bolton Wanderers (3)	Selhurst, London
20:00 GMT	Benteke 68', 77'	Report	Henry 48'	Stadium: Selhurst Park; Attendance: 7,149; Referee: Stuart Attwell

7 January 2017	Norwich City (2)	2–2	Southampton (1)	Norwich
15:00 GMT	Whittaker 52' (pen.); Naismith 90+2'	Report	van Dijk 38'; Yoshida 67'	Stadium: Carrow Road; Attendance: 12,479; Referee: Chris Kavanagh

18 January 2017 Replay	Southampton (1)	1–0	Norwich City (2)	Southampton
19:45 GMT	Long 90+2'	Report		Stadium: St Mary's Stadium; Attendance: 13,517; Referee: Jon Moss

7 January 2017	Sutton United (5)	0–0	AFC Wimbledon (3)	Sutton, London
15:00 GMT		Report		Stadium: Gander Green Lane; Attendance: 5,013; Referee: Keith Stroud

17 January 2017 Replay	AFC Wimbledon (3)	1–3	Sutton United (5)	Kingston upon Thames, London
19:45 GMT	Elliott 10'	Report	Deacon 75'; Biamou 90'; Fitchett 90+6'	Stadium: Kingsmeadow; Attendance: 4,768; Referee: Chris Sarginson

7 January 2017	Accrington Stanley (4)	2–1	Luton Town (4)	Accrington
15:00 GMT	McConville 45+2'; Beckles 57'	Report	Gray 54'	Stadium: Crown Ground; Attendance: 1,717; Referee: Darren Deadman

7 January 2017	Rotherham United (2)	2–3	Oxford United (3)	Rotherham
15:00 GMT	Ward 51'; Adeyemi 90'	Report	Taylor 41'; Edwards 80'; Hemmings 88'	Stadium: New York Stadium; Attendance: 5,618; Referee: Darren Bond

7 January 2017	Preston North End (2)	1–2	Arsenal (1)	Preston
17:30 GMT	Robinson 7'	Report	Ramsey 46'; Giroud 89'	Stadium: Deepdale; Attendance: 22,185; Referee: Robert Madley

8 January 2017	Cardiff City (2)	1–2	Fulham (2)	Cardiff
11:30 GMT	Pilkington 8'	Report	Johansen 14'; Sessegnon 33'	Stadium: Cardiff City Stadium; Attendance: 5,199; Referee: Andy Woolmer

8 January 2017	Liverpool (1)	0–0	Plymouth Argyle (4)	Liverpool
13:30 GMT		Report		Stadium: Anfield; Attendance: 52,692; Referee: Paul Tierney

18 January 2017 Replay	Plymouth Argyle (4)	0–1	Liverpool (1)	Plymouth
19:45 GMT		Report	Lucas 18'	Stadium: Home Park; Attendance: 17,048; Referee: Graham Scott

8 January 2017	Chelsea (1)	4–1	Peterborough United (3)	Fulham, London
15:00 GMT	Pedro 18', 75'; Batshuayi 43'; Willian 52'	Report	Nichols 70'	Stadium: Stamford Bridge; Attendance: 41,003; Referee: Kevin Friend

8 January 2017	Middlesbrough (1)	3–0	Sheffield Wednesday (2)	Middlesbrough
15:00 GMT	Leadbitter 58'; Negredo 67'; De Roon 90+1'	Report		Stadium: Riverside Stadium; Attendance: 23,661; Referee: David Coote

8 January 2017	Tottenham Hotspur (1)	2–0	Aston Villa (2)	Tottenham, London
16:00 GMT	Davies 71'; Son Heung-min 80'	Report		Stadium: White Hart Lane; Attendance: 31,182; Referee: Mike Dean

9 January 2017	Cambridge United (4)	1–2	Leeds United (2)	Cambridge
19:45 GMT	Ikpeazu 25'	Report	Dallas 56'; Mowatt 63'	Stadium: Abbey Stadium; Attendance: 7,973; Referee: Craig Pawson

== Fourth round proper ==
A total of 32 teams played in the fourth round, all winners of the third round. The draw took place at the BT Tower on 9 January 2017. The round included two teams from Level 5 who were still in the competition: Lincoln City, leading the National League on the night of their third round replay and Sutton United, fifteenth on the same night and therefore the lowest-ranked team to play in this round.

27 January 2017	Derby County (2)	2–2	Leicester City (1)	Derby
19:55 GMT	Bent 21'; Bryson 40'	Report	Bent 8' (o.g.); Morgan 86'	Stadium: Pride Park Stadium; Attendance: 25,079; Referee: Mark Clattenburg

8 February 2017 Replay	Leicester City (1)	3–1 (a.e.t.)	Derby County (2)	Leicester
19:45 GMT	King 46'; Ndidi 94'; Gray 114'	Report	Camara 61'	Stadium: King Power Stadium; Attendance: 31,648; Referee: Mike Jones

28 January 2017	Liverpool (1)	1–2	Wolverhampton Wanderers (2)	Liverpool
12:30 GMT	Origi 86'	Report	Stearman 1'; Weimann 41'	Stadium: Anfield; Attendance: 52,469; Referee: Craig Pawson

28 January 2017	Tottenham Hotspur (1)	4–3	Wycombe Wanderers (4)	Tottenham, London
15:00 GMT	Son Heung-min 60', 90+7'; Janssen 64' (pen.); Alli 89'	Report	Hayes 23', 36' (pen.); Thompson 83'	Stadium: White Hart Lane; Attendance: 31,440; Referee: Roger East

28 January 2017	Oxford United (3)	3–0	Newcastle United (2)	Oxford
15:00 GMT	Hemmings 46'; Nelson 79'; Martínez 87'	Report		Stadium: Kassam Stadium; Attendance: 11,810; Referee: David Coote

28 January 2017	Lincoln City (5)	3–1	Brighton & Hove Albion (2)	Lincoln
15:00 GMT	Power 57' (pen.); Tomori 62' (o.g.); Robinson 85'	Report	Towell 24'	Stadium: Sincil Bank; Attendance: 9,469; Referee: Andrew Madley

28 January 2017	Chelsea (1)	4–0	Brentford (2)	Fulham, London
15:00 GMT	Willian 14'; Pedro 21'; Ivanović 69'; Batshuayi 81' (pen.)	Report		Stadium: Stamford Bridge; Attendance: 41,042; Referee: Michael Oliver

28 January 2017	Rochdale (3)	0–4	Huddersfield Town (2)	Rochdale
15:00 GMT		Report	Quaner 42'; Brown 66' (pen.); Hefele 72', 84'	Stadium: Spotland; Attendance: 7,431; Referee: Oliver Langford

28 January 2017	Burnley (1)	2–0	Bristol City (2)	Burnley
15:00 GMT	Vokes 45'; Defour 68'	Report		Stadium: Turf Moor; Attendance: 14,921; Referee: Andre Marriner

28 January 2017	Blackburn Rovers (2)	2–0	Blackpool (4)	Blackburn
15:00 GMT	Gallagher 9'; Bennett 22'	Report		Stadium: Ewood Park; Attendance: 9,327; Referee: Peter Bankes

28 January 2017	Middlesbrough (1)	1–0	Accrington Stanley (4)	Middlesbrough
15:00 GMT	Downing 69'	Report		Stadium: Riverside Stadium; Attendance: 24,040; Referee: Anthony Taylor

28 January 2017	Crystal Palace (1)	0–3	Manchester City (1)	Selhurst, London
15:00 GMT		Report	Sterling 43'; Sané 71'; Touré 90+3'	Stadium: Selhurst Park; Attendance: 13,979; Referee: Mike Jones

28 January 2017	Southampton (1)	0–5	Arsenal (1)	Southampton
17:30 GMT		Report	Welbeck 15', 22'; Walcott 35', 69', 84'	Stadium: St Mary's Stadium; Attendance: 31,288; Referee: Kevin Friend

29 January 2017	Millwall (3)	1–0	Watford (1)	Bermondsey, London
12:00 GMT	Morison 85'	Report		Stadium: The Den; Attendance: 9,772; Referee: Martin Atkinson

29 January 2017	Fulham (2)	4–1	Hull City (1)	Fulham, London
12:30 GMT	Aluko 17'; Martin 54'; Sessegnon 66'; Johansen 78'	Report	Evandro 49'	Stadium: Craven Cottage; Attendance: 15,143; Referee: Paul Tierney

29 January 2017	Sutton United (5)	1–0	Leeds United (2)	Sutton, London
14:00 GMT	Collins 53' (pen.)	Report		Stadium: Gander Green Lane; Attendance: 4,997; Referee: Stuart Attwell

29 January 2017	Manchester United (1)	4–0	Wigan Athletic (2)	Old Trafford, Greater Manchester
16:00 GMT	Fellaini 44'; Smalling 57'; Mkhitaryan 74'; Schweinsteiger 81'	Report		Stadium: Old Trafford; Attendance: 75,229; Referee: Neil Swarbrick

== Fifth round proper ==
A total of 16 clubs played in the fifth round, all winners of the fourth round. The draw was held on 30 January 2017, and the matches were played across the weekend of 18–20 February 2017. The round included the two teams from Level 5 that were still in the competition: Lincoln City and Sutton United, whose fourth round victories ensured the first ever fifth round with two non-league sides remaining. Lincoln City were in this round for the first time in 115 years and Sutton United for the first time in their history.

18 February 2017	Burnley (1)	0–1	Lincoln City (5)	Burnley
12:30 GMT		Report	Raggett 89'	Stadium: Turf Moor; Attendance: 19,185; Referee: Graham Scott

18 February 2017	Middlesbrough (1)	3–2	Oxford United (3)	Middlesbrough
15:00 GMT	Leadbitter 26' (pen.); Gestede 34'; Stuani 86'	Report	Maguire 64'; Martínez 65'	Stadium: Riverside Stadium; Attendance: 28,198; Referee: Andre Marriner

18 February 2017	Huddersfield Town (2)	0–0	Manchester City (1)	Huddersfield
15:00 GMT		Report		Stadium: Kirklees Stadium; Attendance: 24,129; Referee: Anthony Taylor

1 March 2017 Replay	Manchester City (1)	5–1	Huddersfield Town (2)	Manchester
19:45 GMT	Sané 30'; Agüero 35' (pen.), 73'; Zabaleta 38'; Iheanacho 90+1'	Report	Bunn 7'	Stadium: City of Manchester Stadium; Attendance: 42,425; Referee: Paul Tierney

18 February 2017	Millwall (3)	1–0	Leicester City (1)	Bermondsey, London
15:00 GMT	Cummings 90'	Report		Stadium: The Den; Attendance: 18,012; Referee: Craig Pawson

18 February 2017	Wolverhampton Wanderers (2)	0–2	Chelsea (1)	Wolverhampton
17:30 GMT		Report	Pedro 65'; Costa 89'	Stadium: Molineux Stadium; Attendance: 30,193; Referee: Jon Moss

19 February 2017	Fulham (2)	0–3	Tottenham Hotspur (1)	Fulham, London
14:00 GMT		Report	Kane 16', 51', 73'	Stadium: Craven Cottage; Attendance: 22,557; Referee: Robert Madley

19 February 2017	Blackburn Rovers (2)	1–2	Manchester United (1)	Blackburn
16:15 GMT	Graham 17'	Report	Rashford 27'; Ibrahimović 75'	Stadium: Ewood Park; Attendance: 23,130; Referee: Martin Atkinson

20 February 2017	Sutton United (5)	0–2	Arsenal (1)	Sutton, London
19:55 GMT		Report	Pérez 26'; Walcott 55'	Stadium: Gander Green Lane; Attendance: 5,013; Referee: Michael Oliver

== Quarter-finals ==
A total of eight clubs played in the quarter-finals, all winners of the fifth round. The draw was held on 19 February 2017 at Ewood Park, home of Blackburn Rovers F.C., immediately following the Blackburn Rovers v Manchester United match. Matches were played between 11 and 13 March 2017.

In a break from tradition, the FA officially renamed the stage the 'Quarter-finals', the name that had been used colloquially to describe what was previously called the sixth round proper. Changes to previous rules meant that tied matches would have gone to extra-time and potentially a penalty shootout at this stage rather than to a replay, and that a fourth substitute would have been permitted in extra time. The round included Lincoln City from Level 5, who became the first non-league club to reach the quarter-finals since 1914.

11 March 2017	Middlesbrough (1)	0–2	Manchester City (1)	Middlesbrough
12:15 GMT		Report	Silva 3'; Agüero 67'	Stadium: Riverside Stadium; Attendance: 32,228; Referee: Mike Dean

11 March 2017	Arsenal (1)	5–0	Lincoln City (5)	Holloway, London
17:30 GMT	Walcott 45+1'; Giroud 53'; Waterfall 58' (o.g.); Sánchez 72'; Ramsey 75'	Report		Stadium: Emirates Stadium; Attendance: 59,454; Referee: Anthony Taylor

12 March 2017	Tottenham Hotspur (1)	6–0	Millwall (3)	Tottenham, London
14:00 GMT	Eriksen 31'; Son Heung-min 41', 54', 90+2'; Alli 72'; Janssen 79'	Report		Stadium: White Hart Lane; Attendance: 31,137; Referee: Martin Atkinson

13 March 2017	Chelsea (1)	1–0	Manchester United (1)	Fulham, London
19:45 GMT	Kanté 51'	Report		Stadium: Stamford Bridge; Attendance: 40,801; Referee: Michael Oliver

== Semi-finals ==
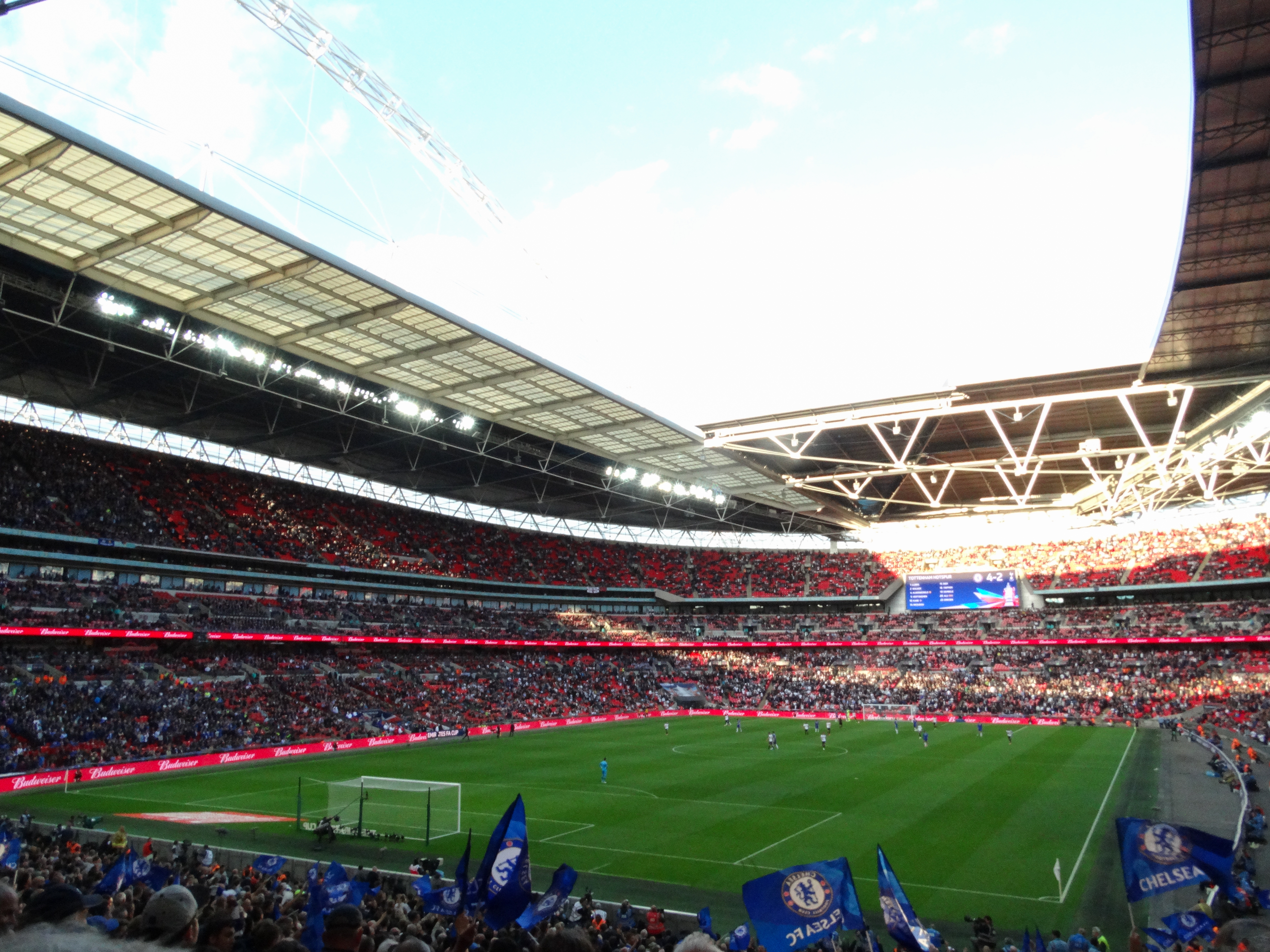
The first of the 2016-17 FA Cup semi-finals, Chelsea vs Tottenham, at Wembley Stadium.

The four winners of the quarter-finals progressed to the semi-finals. The semi-final draw took place at Stamford Bridge on 13 March following the quarter-final tie between Chelsea and Manchester United. The semi-finals were played at Wembley Stadium on 22 and 23 April 2017.

22 April 2017	Chelsea (1)	4–2	Tottenham Hotspur (1)	Wembley Stadium, London
17:15 BST	Willian 5', 43' (pen.); Hazard 75'; Matić 80'	Report	Kane 18'; Alli 52'	Attendance: 86,355; Referee: Martin Atkinson

23 April 2017	Arsenal (1)	2–1 (a.e.t.)	Manchester City (1)	Wembley Stadium, London
15:00 BST	Monreal 71'; Sánchez 101'	Report	Agüero 62'	Attendance: 85,725; Referee: Craig Pawson

== Final ==
27 May 2017
17:30 BST

Arsenal	2–1	Chelsea
Sánchez 4'; Ramsey 79'	Report	Costa 76'

Wembley Stadium, London
Attendance: 89,472
Referee: Anthony Taylor (Cheshire)

== Top goalscorers ==
Rank	Player	Club	Goals
1	(England) Adam Morgan	Curzon Ashton	6
1	(South Korea) Son Heung-min	Tottenham Hotspur	6
3	(Argentina) Sergio Agüero	Manchester City	5
3	(England) Kane Hemmings	Oxford United	5
3	(France) Mikael Mandron	Eastleigh	5
3	(Jamaica) Theo Robinson^{a}	Lincoln City	5
3	(England) Theo Walcott	Arsenal	5

^{a} Theo Robinson moved to Southend United during the January transfer window with Lincoln still in the cup.

== Broadcasting rights ==
The domestic broadcasting rights for the competition were held by the BBC and subscription channel BT Sport. The BBC held the rights since 2014–15, while BT Sport since 2013–14. The FA Cup Final was required to be broadcast live on UK terrestrial television under the Ofcom code of protected sporting events.

The following matches were broadcast live on UK television:

Round	Date	Teams	Kick-off	Channels	
Round	Date	Teams	Kick-off	Digital	TV
First round	4 November	Eastleigh v Swindon Town	7:55pm	BBC iPlayer	BBC Two
First round	5 November	Merstham v Oxford United	12:30pm	BT Sport App	BT Sport 1
First round	7 November	Southport v Fleetwood Town	7:45pm	BT Sport App	BT Sport 1
First round (Replay)	16 November	Brackley Town v Gillingham	7:45pm	BT Sport App	BT Sport 2
First round (Replay)	17 November	Dover Athletic v Cambridge United (Replay)	7:45pm	BT Sport App	BT Sport 2
Second round	2 December	Macclesfield Town v Oxford United	7:55pm	BBC iPlayer	BBC Two
Second round	4 December	Curzon Ashton v AFC Wimbledon	12:00pm	BT Sport App	BT Sport 1
Second round	5 December	Lincoln City v Oldham Athletic	7:45pm	BT Sport App	BT Sport 1
Second round (Replay)	20 December	Peterborough United v Notts County	7:45pm	BT Sport App	BT Sport 2
Second round (Replay)	21 December	Newport County v Plymouth Argyle	7:45pm	BT Sport App	BT Sport 2
Third round	6 January	West Ham United v Manchester City	7:55pm	BBC iPlayer	BBC One
Third round	7 January	Manchester United v Reading	12:30pm	BT Sport App	BT Sport 2
Third round	7 January	Preston North End v Arsenal	5:30pm	BT Sport App	BT Sport 2
Third round	8 January	Cardiff City v Fulham	11:30am	BBC iPlayer	BBC One Wales
Third round	8 January	Liverpool v Plymouth Argyle	1:30pm	BT Sport App	BT Sport 2
Third round	8 January	Tottenham Hotspur v Aston Villa	4:00pm	BBC iPlayer	BBC One
Third round	9 January	Cambridge United v Leeds United	7:45pm	BT Sport App	BT Sport 2
Third round (Replay)	17 February	Lincoln City v Ipswich Town	8:05pm	BBC iPlayer	BBC One
Third round (Replay)	18 February	Plymouth Argyle v Liverpool	7:45pm	BT Sport App	BT Sport 2
Fourth round	27 January	Derby County v Leicester City	7:55pm	BBC iPlayer	BBC One
Fourth round	28 January	Liverpool v Wolverhampton Wanderers	12:30pm	BT Sport App	BT Sport 2
Fourth round	28 January	Southampton v Arsenal	5:30pm	BT Sport App	BT Sport 2
Fourth round	29 January	Millwall v Watford	12:00pm	BBC iPlayer	BBC One
Fourth round	29 January	Sutton United v Leeds United	2:00pm	BT Sport App	BT Sport 2
Fourth round	29 January	Manchester United v Wigan Athletic	4:00pm	BBC iPlayer	BBC One
Fourth round (Replay)	8 February	Leicester City v Derby County	7:45pm	BBC iPlayer	BBC One
Fifth round	18 February	Burnley v Lincoln City	12:30pm	BT Sport App	BT Sport 2
Fifth round	18 February	Wolverhampton Wanderers v Chelsea	5:30pm	BT Sport App	BT Sport 2
Fifth round	19 February	Fulham v Tottenham Hotspur	2:00pm	BBC iPlayer	BBC One
Fifth round	19 February	Blackburn Rovers v Manchester United	4:15pm	BT Sport App	BT Sport 2
Fifth round	20 February	Sutton United v Arsenal	7:55pm	BBC iPlayer	BBC One
Fifth round (Replay)	1 March	Manchester City v Huddersfield Town	7:45pm	BBC iPlayer	BBC One
Quarter-finals	11 March	Middlesbrough v Manchester City	12:15pm	BT Sport App	BT Sport 2
Quarter-finals	11 March	Arsenal v Lincoln City	5:30pm	BT Sport App	BT Sport 2
Quarter-finals	12 March	Tottenham Hotspur v Millwall	2:00pm	BBC iPlayer	BBC One
Quarter-finals	13 March	Chelsea v Manchester United	7:45pm	BBC iPlayer	BBC One
Semi-finals	22 April	Chelsea v Tottenham Hotspur	5:15pm	BBC iPlayer	BBC One
Semi-finals	23 April	Arsenal v Manchester City	3:00pm	BT Sport App	BT Sport 1
Final	27 May	Arsenal v Chelsea	5:30pm	BBC iPlayer	BBC One
Final	27 May	Arsenal v Chelsea	5:30pm	BT Sport App	BT Sport 2
