= Hoffman Athletic F.C. =

Hoffman Athletic F.C. may refer to either of two association football clubs operated by the Hoffman Manufacturing Company during the 20th century:

- Hoffman Athletic F.C. (Chelmsford)
- Hoffman Athletic F.C. (Stonehouse)
