= Roarie Deacon =

English footballer (born 1991)

Personal information
- Full name: Roarie Milton Ryan Deacon
- Date of birth: 12 October 1991 (age 35)
- Place of birth: Wandsworth, England
- Height: 5 ft 9 in (1.75 m)
- Position: Midfielder

Team information
- Current team: Harold Hill (player/assistant manager)

Youth career
- 2008–2010: Arsenal

Senior career*
Years	Team	Apps	(Gls)
2010–2011	Arsenal	0	(0)
2011–2013	Sunderland	0	(0)
2013–2015	Stevenage	48	(1)
2015–2016	Crawley Town	37	(5)
2016–2017	Sutton United	42	(7)
2017–2019	Dundee	33	(1)
2019	Sutton United	16	(1)
2019–2021	Havant & Waterlooville	25	(5)
2021–2023	Maidstone United	81	(11)
2023–2024	Havant & Waterlooville	29	(0)
2024	→ Dulwich Hamlet (loan)	9	(1)
2024–2025	Ramsgate	39	(7)
2025	Ashford United	13	(1)
2025–2026	Hythe Town	8	(1)
2026–	Harold Hill		

International career
2009–2010	England U19	4	(1)
- * Club domestic league appearances and goals as of 16:37, 9 February 2026 (UTC)

Roarie Milton Ryan Deacon (born 12 October 1991) is an English professional footballer who plays as a midfielder for Essex Olympian Football League Premier Division club Harold Hill, and also serves as the club's assistant manager.

Deacon started his career at Premier League club Arsenal in 2009, and signed professional terms ahead of the 2010–11 season. He made no first-team appearances and was subsequently released in the summer of 2011. Deacon then joined Sunderland in July that year. He left Sunderland when his contract expired in January 2013, again without making a first-team appearance. Deacon signed for League One team Stevenage on a free transfer in March 2013 before joining League Two side Crawley Town in July 2015. He has also represented England at U19 level.

Deacon enjoyed a memorable year with Sutton United during the 2016–17 season, when he was the top FA Cup scorer in the team which became the 9th non-League side to reach the 5th round since 1945. He subsequently played for Scottish Premiership club Dundee for 18 months before returning to Sutton in February 2019.

== Club career ==
=== Early career ===
Deacon began his career as a schoolboy at Arsenal in 2008, progressing through the youth ranks and playing regularly for the club's U18 side. He signed his first professional contract with the club in July 2010, agreeing an initial one-year deal. During the 2010–11 season, he made 16 appearances for the reserve side, scoring four times. He was also part of the U19 team that reached the semi-finals of the Dallas Cup, scoring three goals. Despite playing regularly at reserve level, he did not make any first-team appearances, and was subsequently released by Arsenal on 17 June 2011. Just two weeks after his release from Arsenal, Deacon joined fellow Premier League side Sunderland on a one-and-a-half-year contract. Deacon made 20 appearances for Sunderland's second string during the 2011–12 season, scoring three goals, but failed to break through into the first-team. He made a further eight appearances for Sunderland's U21 team during the first half of the 2012–13 campaign. In January 2013, having made no first-team appearances, Sunderland announced that he had left the club upon the expiry of his contract.

=== Stevenage ===
In March 2013, Deacon signed for League One side Stevenage on a free transfer. He made his debut for the club, and first professional appearance, in the club's 1–0 home victory over Hartlepool United on 1 April, coming on as an 80th-minute substitute.

On 12 May 2014, Deacon signed a new contract extension at the club.

=== Crawley Town ===
On 28 July 2015, Deacon joined League Two team Crawley Town on a one-year deal. He made his competitive debut for Crawley in their opening game of the season on 8 August 2015, providing the assist for Gwion Edwards' goal in a 1–1 draw with Oxford United. He scored his first goals for Crawley on 22 August 2015 in a 3–0 victory over Cambridge United; he opened the scoring in the 39th minute with a deflected shot before scoring Crawley's second after 47 minutes. Following the match, Deacon stated "It's my first two goals for Crawley and I am over the moon really but the team were great". He appeared in 40 matches across the 2015–16 season and scored 5 goals, but was not offered a new contract at the end of the season.

=== Sutton United ===
Following trial spells with Cambridge United and Portsmouth, Deacon signed for National League newcomers Sutton United. Deacon made his debut for the club on the opening day of the 2016–17 season, a 3–1 home defeat to Solihull Moors. Deacon scored his first league goal for the U's when he finished off a team counter-attack in the last minute of added time in a 3–1 victory over Lincoln City at Sincil Bank on 13 August 2016, securing Sutton's first win in the fifth tier of English football in 16 years. One week later he was voted man of the match after his saved shot was finished by Ross Stearn and he assisted a goal for Bedsenté Gomis in a 2–0 home victory against Macclesfield Town, which saw Sutton briefly rise to third in the league, then the club's highest level in its history. On 8 October, Deacon scored his second goal for the club with a fine solo effort and assisted two more for Ross Stearn and Craig McAllister in another man of the match performance when Sutton routed Surrey rivals Woking 4–1 at Gander Green Lane. The following day he featured in The Non-League Paper's "team of the day" with a 9/10 rating.

Having scored the winner in a 2–1 home victory against Forest Green Rovers in the FA Cup fourth qualifying round on 15 October, Deacon netted his first brace for Sutton on 5 November when he struck twice in a first round victory over Dartford at Princes Park; Sutton went on to win 6–3. On 3 December, Deacon scored a dramatic winner in the final minute of added time in the second round tie, a 2–1 home victory over League Two side Cheltenham Town, to send Sutton through to the third round of the FA Cup for the first time in 22 years. The following day Deacon featured on The Non-League Paper's front page and again in the team of the day, alongside Simon Downer and manager Paul Doswell. Deacon said later: "It was 100% the best moment of my career, putting Sutton into the Third Round of the FA Cup, it was the stuff dreams are made of for anyone." Deacon was voted player of the month by Sutton supporters.

In the third round, Sutton were drawn to face League One side and local rivals AFC Wimbledon, ranked 50 places above Sutton in the league pyramid, at home; the tie, played on 7 January 2017, ended 0–0. The replay took place at Kingsmeadow on 17 January. Sutton were a goal down when midway through the second half, Deacon fired in a stunning strike from the edge of the penalty area to level the score. He assisted a second goal for Maxime Biamou to help the U's complete a historic comeback and win the match 3–1, putting Sutton through to the fourth round of the FA Cup for the first time since 1989. Deacon was nicknamed "magic man" by Paul Doswell and Sutton supporters.

In the fourth round on 29 January, Deacon featured prominently in Sutton's 1–0 victory over Championship side Leeds United, who were ranked 84 league places above Sutton, putting the U's into the fifth round of the FA Cup for the first time in the club's 118-year history. Deacon was named in the FA/OPTA Team of the Round. On 20 February, Sutton played Deacon's boyhood club Arsenal in the fifth round. Deacon hit the crossbar during the second half but could not stop Sutton falling to a 0–2 defeat. He was voted player of the month for January/February and finished the season as joint top scorer in all competitions alongside Biamou. Deacon won the Players' Player of the Year and Supporters' Player of the Year awards and his goal against AFC Wimbledon was voted goal of the season.

=== Dundee ===
On 14 June 2017, Deacon signed a deal with Scottish Premiership club Dundee. Deacon scored his first Dundee goal at Pittodrie to equalise against Aberdeen in a 2–1 defeat. Deacon left Dundee on 31 January 2019 by mutual consent.

=== Return to Sutton United ===
In February 2019, he returned to Sutton United.

=== Havant & Waterlooville ===
He joined National League South side Havant & Waterlooville in summer 2019.

=== Maidstone United ===
On 10 June 2021, Deacon joined Maidstone United. He would help Maidstone win the 2021–22 National League South. After being relegated the following season, Deacon would leave Maidstone in June 2023.

=== Havant & Waterlooville return and Dulwich Hamlet loan ===
On 13 June 2023, Havant & Waterlooville announced the re-signing of Deacon following his release from Maidstone United.

On 16 March 2024, Deacon joined Isthmian League Premier Division club Dulwich Hamlet on loan until the end of the season. He made his first start the same day in a league win over Lewes.

Havant & Waterlooville confirmed that Deacon would leave the club upon the expiry of his contract in June 2024.

=== Ramsgate ===
In July 2024, Deacon joined Isthmian South East Division side Ramsgate. On 18 April 2025, Deacon won the South East Division title with The Rams and earned promotion to the Premier Division.

=== Ashford United ===
On 25 July 2025, Deacon returned to the Isthmian South East Division, joining Ashford United.

=== Hythe Town ===
In November 2025, Deacon joined Southern Counties East Football League Premier Division club Hythe Town as player/assistant manager. He departed the club in February 2026.

=== Harold Hill (player/assistant manager) ===
After leaving Hythe, Deacon joined Essex Olympian Football League Premier Division club Harold Hill and helped the club avoid relegation. On 4 June 2026, Harold Hill announced that Deacon would also serve as the club's assistant manager to long-time teammate Joe Ellul.

== International career ==
Deacon has represented the England U19 team on three occasions. After appearing as an unused substitute in England's 3–1 victory over Finland U19s on 9 October 2009, he made his debut two days later in a 3–1 win against Slovenia, coming on as a second-half substitute and scoring England's third goal from the penalty spot. Three days later, on 14 October, he started in a 2–0 win over Slovakia U19s in Lendava. In March 2010, Deacon was called up to play in a friendly match against a Netherlands U19 side, earning his third cap from the substitute's bench in a 1–1 draw.

== Personal life ==
Deacon is of Jamaican descent.

== Career statistics ==
As of matches played 24 January 2026

Appearances and goals by club, season and competition
Club	Season	League			National Cup		League Cup		Other		Total	
Club	Season	Division	Apps	Goals	Apps	Goals	Apps	Goals	Apps	Goals	Apps	Goals
Arsenal	2010–11	Premier League	0	0	0	0	0	0	0	0	0	0
Sunderland	2011–12	Premier League	0	0	0	0	0	0	—		0	0
Sunderland	2012–13	Premier League	0	0	0	0	0	0	—		0	0
Sunderland	Total		0	0	0	0	0	0	—		0	0
Stevenage	2012–13	League One	1	0	—		—		—		1	0
Stevenage	2013–14	League One	23	0	2	0	1	0	1 (Note: Appearance in Football League Trophy)	0	27	0
Stevenage	2014–15	League Two	24	1	2	0	1	0	3 (Note: One appearance in Football League Trophy, two in League Two play-offs)	0	30	1
Stevenage	Total		48	1	4	0	2	0	4	0	58	1
Crawley Town	2015–16	League Two	37	5	1	0	1	0	1	0	40	5
Sutton United	2016–17	National League	42	7	7	5	—		2 (Note: Appearances in FA Trophy)	1	51	13
Dundee	2017–18	Scottish Premiership	28	1	2	0	6	0	—		36	1
Dundee	2018–19	Scottish Premiership	5	0	2	0	0	0	–		7	0
Dundee	Total		33	1	4	0	6	0	0	0	43	1
Sutton United	2018–19	National League	16	1	0	0	—		0	0	16	1
Havant & Waterlooville	2019–20	National League South	12	4	0	0	—		0	0	12	4
Havant & Waterlooville	2020–21	National League South	13	1	3	1	—		2	1	18	3
Havant & Waterlooville	Total		25	5	3	1	0	0	2	1	30	7
Maidstone United	2021–22	National League South	39	6	2	1	0	0	2	0	43	7
Maidstone United	2022–23	National League	42	5	1	0	0	0	4	2	47	7
Maidstone United	Total		81	11	3	1	0	0	6	2	90	14
Havant & Waterlooville	2023–24	National League South	29	0	1	0	0	0	3 (Note: Two appearances in the Hampshire Senior Cup, one appearance in the FA Trophy)	0	33	0
Dulwich Hamlet (loan)	2023–24	Isthmian League Premier Division	9	1	0	0	0	0	0	0	9	1
Ramsgate	2024–25	Isthmian League South East Division	39	7	4	0	—		5 (Note: Three appearances in the FA Trophy, one appearance in the Alan Turvey Trophy, one appearance in the Kent Senior Cup)	0	48	7
Ashford United	2025–26	Isthmian League South East Division	13	1	4	0	—		3	0	20	1
Hythe Town	2025–26	SCEFL Premier Division	8	1	0	0	—		0	0	8	1
Career total			380	41	31	7	9	0	26	4	446	52

== Honours ==
Maidstone United

- National League South: 2021–22

Ramsgate

- Isthmian League South East Division: 2024–25
