= Mid-Essex Football League =

Association football league in England

- Founded: 1898
- Country: England
- Number of clubs: 35 11 Premier Division; 12 Division One 12 Division Two
- Feeder to: Essex Olympian Football League
- Promotion to: Essex Olympian Football League Division Two

The Mid-Essex Football League was a football competition based in England, which in its last season (2025-26) had three divisions and 35 teams competing. On 9 June 2026, the Mid Essex Football League was merged with the Essex and Suffolk Border League. The former Mid-Essex League teams have either migrated to the Essex and Suffolk Border League or to the Essex Olympian Football League.

== Member clubs 2025–26 ==
The league had 35 teams spread over three divisions for the 2025–26 season:

Premier Division
- Beacon Hill Rovers Reserves
- Benfleet U23s
- Brentwood Athletic
- Fleet
- Harold Hill Development
- Hutton Development
- Mayland Village
- Social Club Birchanger 1985
- Stock United
- Woodham Radars
- United Chelmsford Churches

Division One

- Baddow Athletic
- Beaulieu Park
- Emerson & Upminster Reserves
- Eversley Athletic
- Galleywood
- Great Baddow
- Harold Wood Athletic 'B'
- Sandon Royals Reserves
- South Cestos
- Springfield
- Wakering Sports Development
- Witham Town Reserves

Division Two

- AS Rawreth Reserves
- Broomfield 'A'
- Emerson & Upminster 'A'
- Essex Royals
- Mates
- Rayleigh Saturday 'A'
- Springfield Development
- Southminster United
- Tillingham Hostpur
- Willvale Rangers
- Witham Town 'A'
- Writtle

== Champions ==
Premier Division

- 1908–09 – Heybridge Swifts
- 1909–10 – Manor Works
- 1910–11 – Manor Works
- 1911–12 – Heybridge Swifts
- 1912–13 – Hoffman Athletic
- 1921–22 – Hoffman Athletic
- 1927–28 – Burnham Ramblers
- 1934–35 – Hoffman Athletic
- 1937–38 – Hoffman Athletic
- 1946–47 – Heybridge Swifts
- 1949–50 – Maldon Town
- 1954–55 – Burnham Ramblers
- 1956–57 – Springfield
- 1957–58 – Springfield
- 1958–59 – Springfield
- 1961–62 – Burnham Ramblers
- 1987–88 – Fyfield Sports
- 1997–98 – Shenfield
- 2007–08 – Southminster St. Leonards
- 2008–09 – Braintree & Bocking United
- 2009–10 – Braintree & Bocking United
- 2010–11 – Scotia Billericay
- 2011–12 – Great Baddow
- 2012–13 – Great Baddow
- 2013–14 – Great Baddow
- 2014–15 – Great Baddow
- 2015–16 – Pro Essex
- 2016–17 – Beacon Hill Rovers
- 2017–18 – Braintree & Bocking United
- 2018–19 – CT66
- 2019–20 – Curtailed due to the COVID-19 pandemic
- 2020–21 – Harold Hill
- 2021–22 – Southend Rangers
- 2022–23 – Hannakins Farm
- 2023–24 – Rawreth Lane
- 2024–25 – Sandon Royals
- 2025–26 – Social Club Birchanger 1895

Division One

- 1948–49 – Springfield
- 1955–56 – Heybridge Swifts
- 2007–08 – Springfield Rouge
- 2008–09 – Byfleet Rangers
- 2009–10 – St Clere's
- 2010–11 – Scotia Billericay Reserves
- 2011–12 – Writtle Manor
- 2012–13 – Tillingham Hotspur
- 2013–14 – Beacon Hill Rovers
- 2014–15 – Pro Essex
- 2015–16 – Pro-Athletic
- 2016–17 – St Clere's
- 2017–18 – Brentwood United
- 2018–19 – CT66 Reserves
- 2019–20 – Curtailed due to the COVID-19 pandemic
- 2020–21 – Harold Wood Athletic 'A'
- 2021–22 – Blackmore
- 2022–23 – Brentwood Athletic
- 2023–24 – Broomfield
- 2024–25 – Mayland Village
- 2025–26 – Eversley Athletic

Division Two

- 1907–08 – Hoffman Athletic
- 1908–09 – Hoffman Athletic
- 1909–10 – Hoffman Athletic
- 1912–13 – Billericay Town
- 1930–31 – Hoffman Athletic
- 1931–32 – Billericay Town
- 1932–33 – Billericay Town
- 1948–49 – Witham Town
- 2007–08 – Marconi Athletic
- 2008–09 – Manford Way 'B'
- 2009–10 – Ferrers Athletic
- 2010–11 – Manford Way 'B'
- 2011–12 – Debden Sports 'A'
- 2012–13 – CT
- 2013–14 – Dunmow Rhodes
- 2014–15 – Haver Town
- 2015–16 – St Clere's
- 2016–17 – Emeronians
- 2017–18 – CT66 Reserves
- 2018–19 – Harold Hill
- 2019–20 – Curtailed due to the COVID-19 pandemic
- 2020–21 – Basildon Wanderers
- 2021–22 – Brentwood Athletic Reserves
- 2022–23 – Haver Town
- 2023–24 – Haver Town
- 2024–25 – Benfleet FC U23s
- 2025–26 – Tillingham Hotspur

Division Three

- 1935–36 – Witham Town
- 1947–48 – Witham Town
- 2007–08 – Great Baddow
- 2008–09 – Battlesbridge
- 2009–10 – Broomfield
- 2010–11 – White Hart United
- 2011–12 – Tillingham Hotspur
- 2012–13 – Dunmow Rhodes
- 2013–14 – Great Baddow Reserves
- 2014–15 – Great Leighs Athletic
- 2015–16 – Harold Wood Athletic 'B'
- 2016–17 – Orsett & Thurrock Cricket Club
- 2017–18 – Old Chelmsfordians 'A'
- 2018–19 – White Notley Reserves
- 2019–20 – Curtailed due to the COVID-19 pandemic
- 2020–21 – Harold Hill Reserves
- 2021–22 – Benfleet Reserves
- 2022–23 – Rayleigh
- 2023–24 – Great Baddow
- 2024–25 – Scrattons

Division Four

- 2007–08 – Battlesbridge Reserves
- 2008–09 – Braintree & Bocking United Reserves
- 2009–10 – White Hart United
- 2010–11 – Tillingham Hotspur
- 2011–12 – Laindon Orient
- 2012–13 – Great Baddow Reserves
- 2013–14 – Real Maldon
- 2014–15 – Felsted Rovers
- 2015–16 – Elgar Eagles
- 2016–17 – Writtle 'A'
- 2017–18 – United Chelmsford Churches Reserves
- 2018–19 – Haver Town 'A'
- 2019–20 – Curtailed due to the COVID-19 pandemic
- 2020–21 – Dunmow United
- 2021–22 – Sandon Royals Reserves
- 2022–23 – Hutton Development
- 2023–24 – The Rodings 'A'

Division Five

- 2007–08 – Little Waltham Reserves
- 2008–09 – Great Baddow Reserves
- 2009–10 – St Clere's Reserves
- 2010–11 – Laindon Orient
- 2011–12 – Extreme United
- 2012–13 – Real Maldon
- 2013–14 – Haver Town 'B'
- 2014–15 – Rayne United
- 2015–16 – Royal Oak
- 2016–17 – Southminster St Leonards Reserves
- 2020–21 – Debden Park
- 2021–22 – Old Chelmsfordians Development

Division Six

- 2011–12 – Dunmow
- 2012–13 – Haver Town
- 2013–14 – Writtle Reserves
- 2014–15 – Writtle Manor
