= Harold Hill F.C. =

Association football club in England

Harold Hill
- Full name: Harold Hill Football Club
- Founded: 1947; 79 years ago
- Ground: Park Lane, Aveley, Essex, RM15 4PX
- Owner: Caelan Kellegher
- Chairman: Steve Key
- Manager: Joe Ellul
- League: Essex Olympian League Premier Division
- 2024-25: 2nd - Essex Olympian League Division One
Home colours

Harold Hill Football Club is an English football club, based in Harold Hill in the London Borough of Havering. They currently play in the Mid-Essex League Premier Division. The club is affiliated to the Essex County Football Association.

== History ==
The club joined the Essex Olympian League as Mountnessing in 1984. Apart from one season in Division in 1988–89, they remained in Division Two until 2006, when they were promoted back to the top flight. In 2008, they were renamed Mountnessing Boca but reverted to just Mountnessing two years later.

In 2010, Mountnessing made their debut in the FA Vase, and a year later the club was renamed Harold Hill. The 2013–14 season saw the club gain promotion to the Premier division of the Essex Olympian League, as champions of Division One. The club spent two seasons in the Premier Division but were relegated back to Division one. The club then spent only one season in Division One, before leaving the league and moving to Division Two of the Mid-Essex Football League. Their first season in the Mid-Essex League saw them become champions, as well as win two cups.

== Ground ==
The club plays their home games at Park Lane, Aveley, Essex, RM15 4PX Mid-Essex: accessdate: February 22, 2020</ref>

An unrelated club, also named Harold Hill that competed in the London League in the 1960s, played at St Neots Road in Harold Hill.

== Honours ==
- Essex Olympian League
  - Division One Champions (1) 2014–15
- Mid-Essex Football League
  - Division Two Champions (1) 2018–19
  - Division Two League Cup Winner (1) 2018–19
  - Dave Strachan Knock-out Trophy Winner (1) 2018–19
