= Daniel Cordone =

Argentine footballer

Personal information
- Full name: Carlos Daniel Cordone
- Date of birth: 6 January 1974 (age 52)
- Place of birth: General Rodríguez, Argentina
- Position: Striker

Senior career*
Years	Team	Apps	(Gls)
1993–2000	Vélez Sársfield	106	(40)
2000	Racing Club	16	(4)
2000–2001	Newcastle United	21	(2)
2001–2002	Argentinos Juniors	34	(13)
2002–2004	San Lorenzo	41	(12)
2005–2006	Argentino de Merlo	24	(5)
2006–2007	Independiente Rivadavia	19	(2)
Total		261	(78)
- * Club domestic league appearances and goals as of 12:00, 1 December 2006 (UTC)

Carlos Daniel "Lobo" Cordone (born 6 January 1974) is a former Argentine professional football player who played as a striker.

Cordone started his career at Vélez Sársfield and played there for six seasons before moving to Racing Club de Avellaneda in 2000. Later that year he moved to Newcastle United for a fee of £500,000, but failed to meet expectations at Newcastle and only played for the club for one season. He scored three goals, against Derby County, Tottenham Hotspur and Bradford City in the League Cup.

In 2001, he returned to Argentina to play for Argentinos Juniors. After one season with them he moved to San Lorenzo where he helped the club to win the Copa Sudamericana in 2002.

Towards the end of his career he has played for Argentino de Merlo in the Metropolitan 4th division and Independiente Rivadavia in the 3rd division Interior.

== Honours ==
San Lorenzo

- Copa Sudamericana: 2002
