= Hoffman Athletic F.C. (Chelmsford) =

Hoffman Athletic
- Full name: Hoffman Athletic Football Club
- Founded: 1907
- Dissolved: 1984
- Ground: Coval Lane; Rainsford Road; St Fabians Drive

Hoffman Athletic Football Club was a football club based in Chelmsford, Essex, England. They were one of the works football teams of the Hoffman's Bearings Company, the other based at Stonehouse, Gloucestershire and also named Hoffman Athletic. The Essex club participated in the FA Cup on four occasions before and after World War II.

== History ==
The Hoffman Manufacturing Company formed an Athletic Club in 1907, participating in many sports. Football was initially played at Coval Lane before moving to a ground at Rainsford Road. They became members of the Mid-Essex League and were Division Two champions in 1907–08, 1908–09 and 1910–11. After being promoted to Division One, the club were league champions in 1912–13 and 1921–22. They were Division Two Cup winners in 1929–30 and Division Two champions again the following season, before winning Division One for a third time in 1934–35. They also joined the Essex & Suffolk Border League and a successful spell in the mid-late 1930s saw them finish as runners-up in the Senior Division in 1935–36 and 1936–37, and entered the FA Cup for the first time the following season, losing 3–0 at home to Ipswich Town in the fourth qualifying round. They went on to win the league in 1938–39. During this time the team was attracting crowds of over 3,000 for their higher-profile matches.

After the war, the club entered the FA Cup on three further occasions, losing 4–2 at Ford Sports (Dagenham) in the first qualifying round in 1945–46, losing 3–0 at Leyton in the preliminary round in 1946–47, and losing 8–0 at Brentwood & Warley in the extra preliminary round in 1948–49. In 1952, football switched to a pitch at St Fabians Drive, but returned to Rainsford Road in 1980. The name of the company changed during the 1970s and the club's name was switched to RHP (Chelmsford) Sports & Social Club. In 1984, the company withdrew permission for the ground to be used for football and cricket, and football activity ceased.

== Honours ==
- Essex & Suffolk Border League
  - Champions 1938–39
- Mid-Essex League
  - Champions 1912–13, 1921–22, 1934–35, 1937–38
  - Division Two champions 1907–08, 1908–09, 1909–10, 1930–31
  - Division Two Cup winners 1929–30
