= Pablo Bonvín =

Argentine footballer

Personal information
- Full name: Pablo Facundo Bonvín
- Date of birth: April 15, 1981 (age 45)
- Place of birth: Concepción del Uruguay, Argentina
- Height: 1.79 m (5 ft 10 1/2 in)
- Position: Forward

Youth career
- Boca Juniors

Senior career*
Years	Team	Apps	(Gls)
2000–2003	Boca Juniors	2	(1)
2000–2001	→ Newcastle United (loan)	0	(0)
2001–2002	→ Sheffield Wednesday (loan)	23	(4)
2003	Racing Club	3	(0)
2003–2004	Argentinos Juniors	27	(15)
2004–2005	Quilmes	10	(0)
2005	Dorados	13	(1)
2006	San Martín (M)	9	(8)
2006–2007	Argentinos Juniors	14	(0)
2007	Platense		
2008	Universidad Católica (E)	10	(2)
- * Club domestic league appearances and goals as of 21:16, 22 March 2009 (UTC)

Pablo Facundo Bonvín (born 15 April 1981, in Concepción del Uruguay, Entre Ríos Province) is an Argentine former football striker.

== Club career ==
Bonvín started his career at Boca Juniors, where he came through the youth system to play in the first team in 2000. Later that year he was loaned to English Premier League club Newcastle United. After one season with the club he was then loaned to Sheffield Wednesday. At Sheffield Wednesday highlights include scoring a last minute winner against Walsall and scoring twice in a 3–1 win over Barnsley. In 2002 he returned to Boca Juniors.

In 2003, he was transferred to Racing Club de Avellaneda, and then to then second-tier Argentinos Juniors later that year. In 2004 Bonvín returned to the Primera División with Quilmes. In 2005, he played for Dorados de Sinaloa in the Primera División de México. And he returned to Argentina again, this time to play for second-tier San Martín de Mendoza. However, the club were relegated at the end of the 2005–06 season, and Bonvin once again changed clubs, returning to Argentinos Juniors in the Primera División, his last club in Argentina was Platense, he retired after a brief spell with Club Deportivo Universidad Católica del Ecuador.
