= Sean Roberts (soccer) =

South African soccer player

Personal information
- Full name: Sean Joseph Roberts
- Date of birth: 2 January 1983 (age 43)
- Place of birth: Durban, South Africa
- Position: Goalkeeper

Youth career
- Panorama FC
- Florida Albion
- Wits University

Senior career*
Years	Team	Apps	(Gls)
2001–2002	Sheffield Wednesday	1	(0)
2002–2003	Margate FC		
2004–2005	Home United		
2005–2006	Mamelodi Sundowns		
2006–2008	Bidvest Wits		
2008–2015	Ajax Cape Town		
2015–2017	Chippa United		
2017-2018	Rygersdal Football Club		
- * Club domestic league appearances and goals

Sean Roberts (born 2 January 1983) is a South African retired football goalkeeper who last played for Premier Soccer League club Chippa United. After his time at Ajax, Sean had a quick stint at Chippa United where his sterling leadership and performances helped win the club promotion back to the South African PSL. Just after retiring from professional football, Sean joined Rygersdal Football Club where he featured in the club's "Drongos" team - in his first and only appearance for the amateur outfit, he conceded a sloppy goal and vowed never to set foot on a football field again as a player.
