= List of settlements in Northumberland by population =

Northumberland's 14 largest settlements, with the administrative centre marked in yellow.

This is a list of settlements in Northumberland by population based on the results of the 2011 census. The next United Kingdom census will take place in 2021. In 2011, there were 14 built-up area subdivisions with 5,000 or more inhabitants in Northumberland, shown in the table below.

== Population ranking ==
#	Place	Population		
#	Place	2021	2011	2001
1	Blyth	39,730	37,339	35,820
2	Cramlington	28,845	27,683	28,650
3	Ashington	28,280	27,670	27,340
4	Bedlington	16,185	18,470	16,460
5	Morpeth	14,420	14,403	14,059
6	Berwick	13,175	13,265	12,870
7	Hexham	10,945	11,388	11,027
8	Prudhoe	10,280	10,853	10,270
9	Ponteland	10,150	10,135	10,136
10	Alnwick	8,435	8,116	7,767
11	Stakeford (Note: Guide Post named with Stakeford in earlier census)	8,190	8,642	8,836
12	Seaton Delaval	8,010	7,509	7,350
13	Newbiggin	5,950	6,308	5,957
14	Amble	5,860	6,025	6,044

== See also ==
- Northumberland
- List of towns and cities in England by population
