= 1999–2000 Newcastle United F.C. season =

Newcastle United
1999–2000 season
- Chairman: Freddie Shepherd
- Manager: Ruud Gullit (until 28 August); Steve Clarke (caretaker) (from 28 August till 3 September); Sir Bobby Robson (from 3 September)
- Stadium: St. James' Park
- Premier League: 11th
- FA Cup: Semi-final
- League Cup: Third round
- UEFA Cup: Third round
- Top goalscorer: League: Alan Shearer (23); All: Alan Shearer (30)
- Highest home attendance: 36,619 (vs. Sheffield Wednesday, FA Premier League)
- Lowest home attendance: 34,502 (vs. FC Zürich, UEFA Cup second round, second leg)
- Average home league attendance: 36,333
Home colours	Away colours

This article covers the squad and match results for Newcastle United's 1999–2000 season.

During the season, English football club Newcastle United competed in the FA Premier League, finishing in 11th place. The season is notable for the resignation of Ruud Gullit early in the season, with Bobby Robson replacing him as manager.

== Season summary ==
Four defeats from Newcastle's first five FA Premier League fixtures prompted the resignation of manager Ruud Gullit after one year in charge. He had fallen out with Alan Shearer and dropped the striker, who was absent in an embarrassing 2–1 loss to arch-rivals Sunderland.

Veteran ex-England manager and self-confessed Newcastle fan, Bobby Robson was brought in to replace Gullit - making Robson, at 66, the oldest manager in the league. His first home game in charge was particularly memorable and impressive: an 8–0 victory over Sheffield Wednesday, which remains the club's record Premier League home win. Striker Alan Shearer scored five of the goals in that game.

Robson ensured Newcastle's survival in the Premier League. This was achieved with stylish attacking football and with Lee and Shearer back onside. Robson consolidated a fading Newcastle side, and they finished a secure 11th in the final table. More impressively, they were the division's third-highest scoring team with 63 goals from 38 games.

=== Image gallery ===
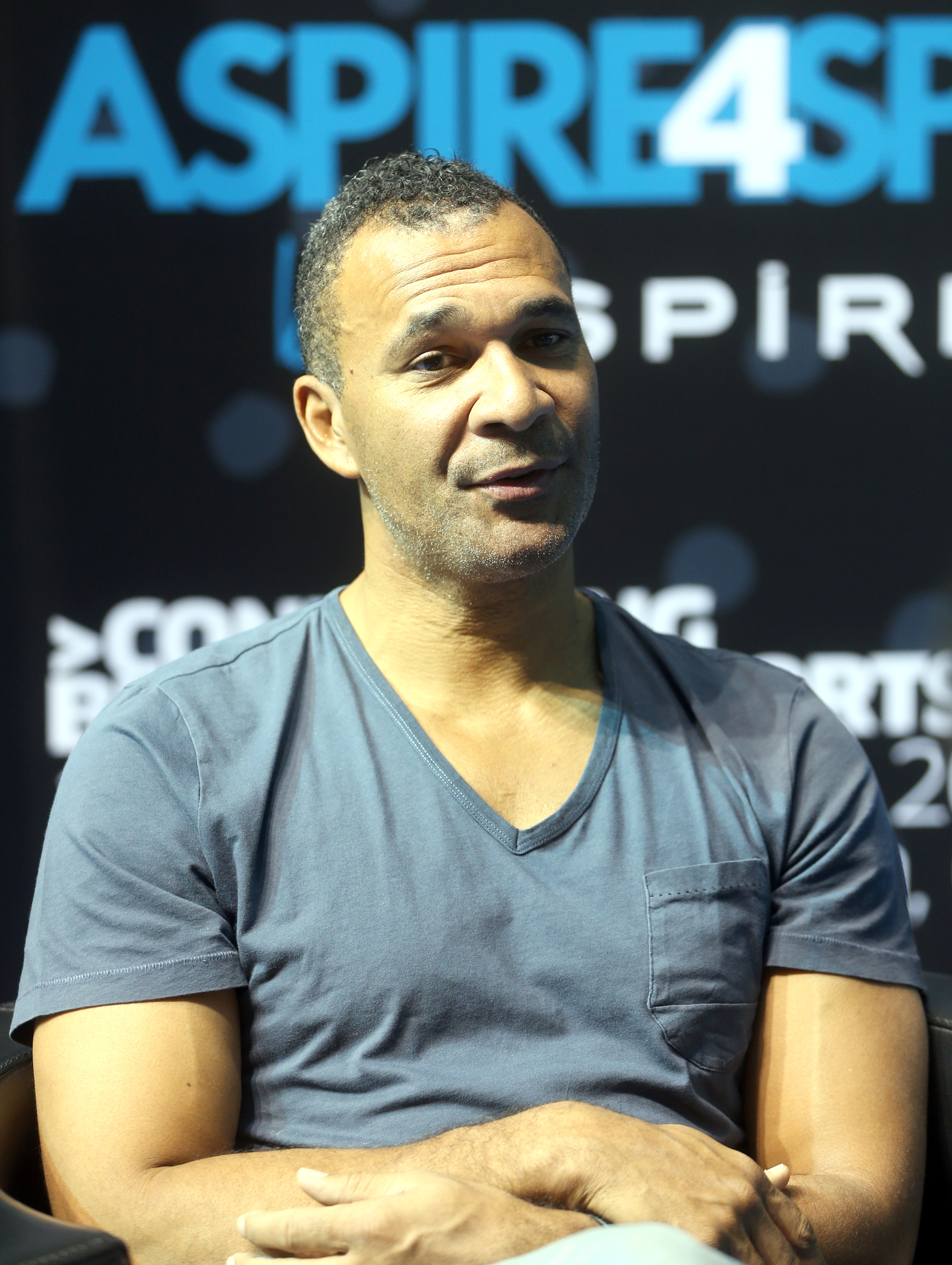
(Netherlands) Ruud Gullit

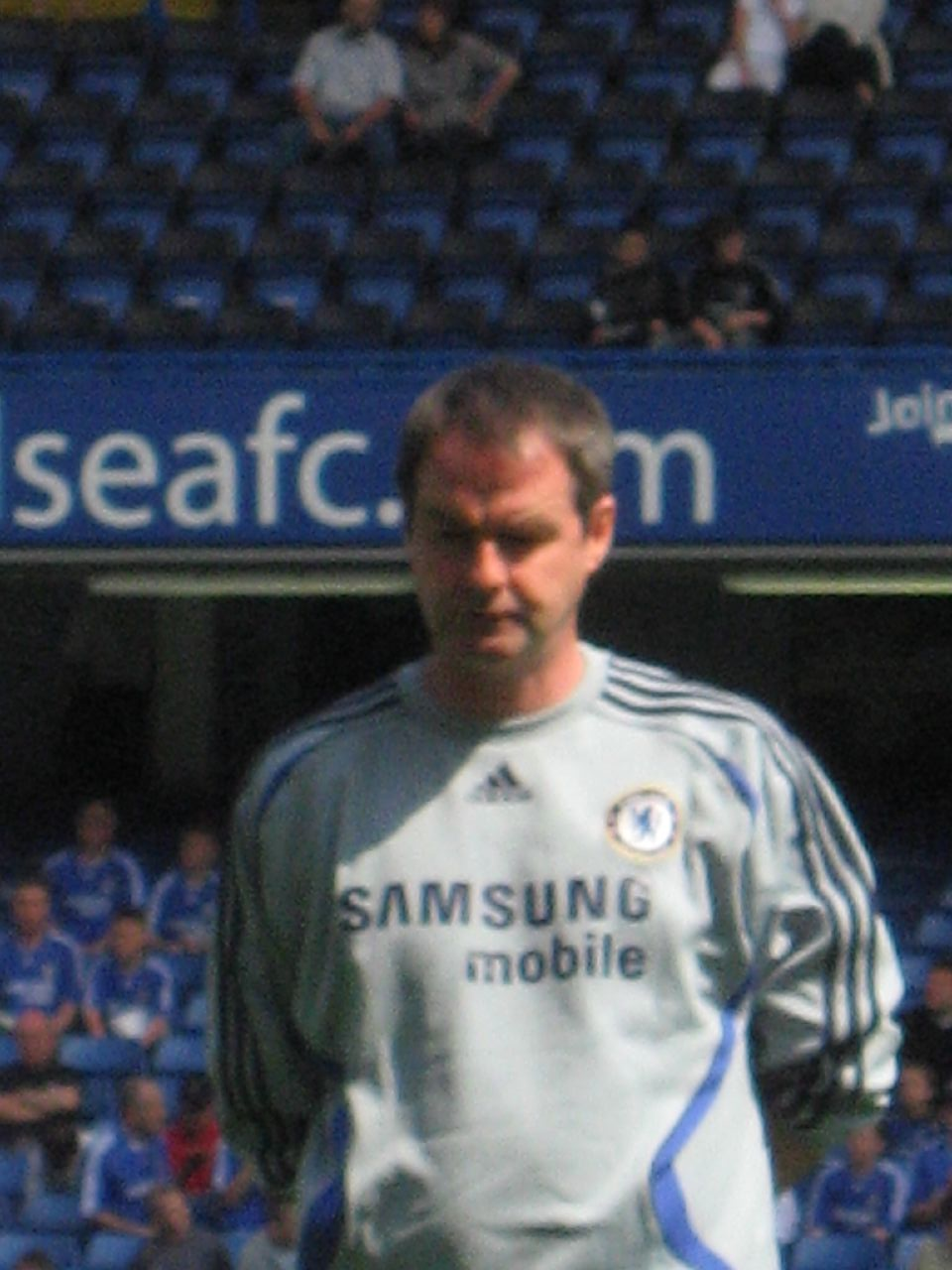
(Scotland) Steve Clarke (caretaker)

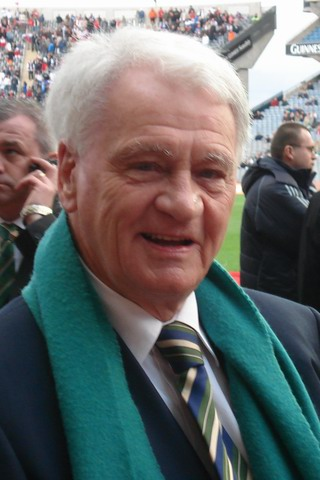
(England) Bobby Robson

== Players ==
=== First-team squad ===
Note: Flags indicate national team as defined under FIFA eligibility rules; some limited exceptions apply. Players may hold more than one non-FIFA nationality.

No.	Pos.	Nation	Player
1	GK	IRL	Shay Given
2	DF	ENG	Warren Barton
3	DF	ESP	Marcelino
4	DF	FRA	Didier Domi
5	DF	FRA	Alain Goma
6	DF	ENG	Steve Howey
7	MF	ENG	Kieron Dyer
8	MF	PAR	Diego Gavilán
9	FW	ENG	Alan Shearer
10	MF	CRO	Silvio Marić
11	MF	WAL	Gary Speed
12	DF	ENG	Andy Griffin
13	GK	ENG	Steve Harper
14	MF	GEO	Temur Ketsbaia
15	MF	PER	Nolberto Solano
16	DF	FRA	Laurent Charvet

No.	Pos.	Nation	Player
17	MF	SCO	Stephen Glass
18	DF	NIR	Aaron Hughes
19	MF	ENG	Jamie McClen
20	FW	SCO	Duncan Ferguson
21	DF	ENG	Carl Serrant
27	DF	ENG	David Beharall
28	FW	ENG	Paul Robinson
29	GK	NED	John Karelse
32	FW	SCO	Kevin Gallacher
33	MF	ENG	Des Hamilton
34	DF	GRE	Nikos Dabizas
36	DF	ITA	Alessandro Pistone
37	MF	ENG	Rob Lee
38	MF	BRA	Fumaça
39	DF	POR	Hélder (on loan from Deportivo de La Coruña)

=== Left club during season ===
Note: Flags indicate national team as defined under FIFA eligibility rules; some limited exceptions apply. Players may hold more than one non-FIFA nationality.

No. / Pos. / Nation / Player; 8 / DF / FRA / Franck Dumas (to Marseille)	No. / Pos. / Nation / Player; 32 / GK / NIR / Tommy Wright (on loan from Manchester City)

=== Reserve squad ===
Note: Flags indicate national team as defined under FIFA eligibility rules; some limited exceptions apply. Players may hold more than one non-FIFA nationality.

No.	Pos.	Nation	Player
22	DF	SCO	Gary Caldwell
23	GK	FRA	Lionel Perez
24	MF	SCO	Garry Brady
25	MF	SCO	Brian Kerr
26	MF	ENG	James Coppinger
30	DF	SCO	Steven Caldwell
31	MF	ENG	Stuart Green
35	MF	ENG	Stuart Elliott

No.	Pos.	Nation	Player
—	GK	ENG	Jonny Brain
—	DF	ENG	Paul Arnison
—	MF	WAL	Kevin Gall
—	MF	ARG	Lucas Cominelli (on loan from Granada)
—	FW	ENG	Michael Chopra
—	FW	IRL	Paul Knight
—	FW	NGR	Shola Ameobi

=== Trialists ===
Note: Flags indicate national team as defined under FIFA eligibility rules; some limited exceptions apply. Players may hold more than one non-FIFA nationality.

No. / Pos. / Nation / Player; — / MF / ITA / Pietro Parente	No. / Pos. / Nation / Player; — / MF / BRA / Paulo Baier (on trial from Atlético Mineiro)

== Transfers ==
=== In ===
==== First team ====
No.	Pos.	Nat.	Name	Age	EU	Moving from	Type	Transfer window	Ends	Transfer fee	Source
5	DF	(France)	Alain Goma	26	EU	Paris Saint-Germain	Transfer			£4,700,000	
3	DF	(Spain)	Marcelino	27	EU	Mallorca	Transfer			£5,800,000	
8	DF	(France)	Franck Dumas	31	EU	Monaco	Transfer			£500,000	
7	MF	(England)	Kieron Dyer	20	EU	Ipswich Town	Transfer			£6,000,000	
29	GK	(Netherlands)	John Karelse	29	EU	NAC Breda	Transfer			£750,000	
32	FW	(Scotland)	Kevin Gallacher	32	EU	Blackburn Rovers (England)	Transfer			£700,000	
8	MF	(Paraguay)	Diego Gavilán	19	Non-EU	Cerro Porteño	Transfer			£2,000,000	
	MF	(Argentina)	Christian Bassedas	27	Non-EU	Vélez Sarsfield	Transfer			£4,130,000	

Last updated: 31 June 2000

==== Reserves and academy ====
No.	Pos.	Nat.	Name	Age	EU	Moving from	Type	Transfer window	Ends	Transfer fee	Source
	GK	(England)	Jonny Brain	16	EU	Carlisle United	Transfer		2002	Unknown	

Last updated: 31 June 2000

=== Out ===
==== First team ====
No.	Pos.	Nat.	Name	Age	EU	Moving from	Type	Transfer window	Ends	Transfer fee	Source
25	FW	(Scotland)	Paul Dalglish	22	EU	Norwich City (England)	Transfer			£300,000	
15	MF	(Greece)	Georgios Georgiadis	27	EU	PAOK	Transfer			£300,000	
12	MF	(Germany)	Dietmar Hamann	25	EU	Liverpool (England)	Transfer			£8,000,000	
27	DF	(Belgium)	Philippe Albert	31	EU	Charleroi	Transfer			£600,000	
3	DF	(England)	Stuart Pearce	37	EU	West Ham United	Free transfer			Free transfer	
40	FW	(Sweden)	Andreas Andersson	25	EU	AIK	Transfer			£2,000,000	
8	DF	(France)	Franck Dumas	32	EU	Marseille	Transfer			£1,500,000	

Last updated: 31 June 2000

==== Reserves and academy ====
No.	Pos.	Nat.	Name	Age	EU	Moving from	Type	Transfer window	Ends	Transfer fee	Source
	DF	(Scotland)	Paddy Kelly	21	EU	Livingston	Free transfer			Free	
	GK	(England)	Peter Keen	22	EU	Carlisle United	Free transfer			Free	
	MF	(Germany)	Ralf Keidel	22	EU	MSV Duisburg	Free transfer			Free	
	DF	(England)	Paul Talbot	20	EU	York City (England)	Free transfer			Free	
	MF	(England)	Paul Arnison	22	EU	Hartlepool United (England)	Free transfer			Free	

Last updated: 31 June 2000

=== Loan in ===
==== First team ====
No.	Pos.	Nat.	Name	Age	EU	Moving from	Type	Transfer window	Ends	Transfer fee	Source
32	GK	(Northern Ireland)	Tommy Wright	35	EU	Manchester City	Loan		1 month	Unknown	
38	MF	(Brazil)	Fumaça	23	Non-EU	Catuense Futebol	Loan				
39	DF	(Portugal)	Hélder	28	Non-EU	Deportivo La Coruña (Spain)	Loan		End of season	£500,000	

Last updated: 31 June 2000

==== Reserves and academy ====
No.	Pos.	Nat.	Name	Age	EU	Moving from	Type	Transfer window	Ends	Transfer fee	Source
	MF	(Argentina)	Lucas Cominelli	22	Non-EU	Granada (Spain)	Loan			Unknown	

Last updated: 31 June 2000

=== Loan out ===
==== First team ====
No.	Pos.	Nat.	Name	Age	EU	Moving from	Type	Transfer window	Ends	Transfer fee	Source
33	MF	(England)	Des Hamilton	23	EU	Norwich City	Loan				

Last updated: 31 June 2000

==== Reserves and academy ====
No.	Pos.	Nat.	Name	Age	EU	Moving from	Type	Transfer window	Ends	Transfer fee	Source
23	GK	(France)	Lionel Perez	32	EU	Scunthorpe United (England)	Loan				
35	MF	(England)	Stuart Elliott	23	EU	Bournemouth	Loan				
35	MF	(England)	Stuart Elliott	23	EU	Stockport County	Loan				
26	FW	(England)	James Coppinger	19	EU	Hartlepool United	Loan				
24	MF	(Scotland)	Garry Brady	23	EU	Norwich City (England)	Loan				
23	GK	(France)	Lionel Perez	32	EU	Cambridge United (England)	Loan				

Last updated: 31 June 2000

== Statistics ==
=== Appearances, goals and cards ===
Last updated on 13 November 2010.
(Starts + substitute appearances)

No.	Pos.	Name	League		FA Cup		League Cup		UEFA Cup		Total		Discipline	
No.	Pos.	Name	Apps	Goals	Apps	Goals	Apps	Goals	Apps	Goals	Apps	Goals	Yellow card	Red card
1	GK	(Republic of Ireland) Shay Given	14	0	2	0	0+1	0	0	0	16+1	0	0	0
2	DF	(England) Warren Barton	33+1	0	6	0	1	0	5	0	45+1	0	7	1
3	DF	(Spain) Marcelino	10+1	0	1+1	0	0	0	2	0	13+2	0	2	0
4	DF	(France) Didier Domi	19+8	3	1+3	1	1	0	4	0	25+11	4	3	0
5	DF	(France) Alain Goma	14	0	0	0	1	0	2	0	17	0	4	0
6	DF	(England) Steve Howey	7+2	0	1	0	0	0	0	0	8+2	0	1	0
7	MF	(England) Kieron Dyer	27+3	3	5+1	1	0	0	3	0	35+4	4	2	0
8	DF	(France) Franck Dumas	6	0	0	0	0	0	1	0	7	0	1	0
8	MF	(Paraguay) Diego Gavilán	2+4	1	0	0	0	0	0	0	2+4	1	0	0
9	FW	(England) Alan Shearer	36+1	23	6	5	1	0	6	2	49+1	30	8	1
10	MF	(Croatia) Silvio Marić	3+10	0	0+1	0	1	0	3	2	7+11	2	0	0
11	MF	(Wales) Gary Speed	36	9	6	3	1	0	6	1	49	13	8	0
12	DF	(England) Andy Griffin	1+2	1	0	0	0	0	0	0	1+2	1	0	0
13	GK	(England) Steve Harper	18	0	4	0	1	0	6	0	29	0	0	1
14	MF	(Georgia (country)) (Cyprus) Temuri Ketsbaia	11+9	0	0+4	0	0	0	2+1	1	13+14	1	1	0
15	MF	(Peru) Nolberto Solano	29+1	3	3	0	1	0	6	1	39+1	4	6	0
16	DF	(France) Laurent Charvet	1+1	0	1	0	0	0	2	0	4+1	0	0	0
17	MF	(Scotland) Stephen Glass	1+5	1	0+1	0	1	0	0+3	0	2+9	1	0	0
18	DF	(Northern Ireland) Aaron Hughes	22+5	2	3+1	0	0	0	2+1	0	27+7	2	0	0
19	MF	(England) Jamie McClen	3+6	0	0	0	0	0	0+2	0	3+8	0	1	0
20	FW	(Scotland) Duncan Ferguson	17+5	6	6	3	0	0	2+1	1	25+6	10	2	0
21	DF	(England) Carl Serrant	2	0	0	0	0	0	0+1	0	2+1	0	0	0
27	DF	(England) David Beharall	0+2	0	0	0	0	0	0	0	0+2	0	0	0
28	FW	(England) Paul Robinson	2+9	0	0	0	0+1	0	0+4	1	2+14	1	0	0
29	GK	(Netherlands) John Karelse	3	0	0	0	0	0	0	0	3	0	0	0
32	GK	(Northern Ireland) Tommy Wright	3	0	0	0	0	0	0	0	3	0	0	0
32	FW	(Scotland) Kevin Gallacher	15+5	2	4+1	1	0	0	0	0	19+6	3	0	0
33	MF	(England) Des Hamilton	0	0	0	0	0	0	0+1	0	0+1	0	0	0
34	DF	(Greece) Nikos Dabizas	29	4	6	2	1	0	6	0	42	6	6	1
36	DF	(Italy) Alessandro Pistone	15	1	3	0	0+1	0	2	0	20+1	1	1	0
37	MF	(England) Rob Lee	30	0	4	1	1	0	6	0	41	1	7	0
38	MF	(Brazil) Fumaça	1+4	0	0+1	0	0	0	0	0	1+5	0	0	0
39	DF	(Portugal) Hélder	8	1	4	0	0	0	0	0	12	1	4	0

(A player sent off for 2 bookable offenses has been counted as 2 yellows and 1 red in the above table)

(3 own goals)

=== Coaching staff ===
Position	Staff
Manager	(England) Bobby Robson
Assistant Manager	(England) John Carver
First Team coach	(England) Nigel Pearson
Goalkeeping Coach	(England) Andy Woodman
Reserve Team Coach	(England) Terry McDermott
Chief scout	(Scotland) Steve Clarke

Last updated: 3 May 2011

=== Top scorers ===
Based on above table.
Last updated on 13 November 2010.

No.	Pos.	Name	League	FA Cup	League Cup	UEFA Cup	Total
1	FW	(England) Alan Shearer	23	5	0	2	30
2	MF	(Wales) Gary Speed	9	3	0	1	13
3	FW	(Scotland) Duncan Ferguson	6	3	0	1	10
4	DF	(Greece) Nikos Dabizas	4	2	0	0	6
5	MF	(Peru) Nolberto Solano	3	0	0	1	4
6	MF	(England) Kieron Dyer	3	1	0	0	4
7	DF	(France) Didier Domi	3	1	0	0	4
8	N/A	Own goals	3	0	0	0	3
9	FW	(Scotland) Kevin Gallacher	2	1	0	0	3
10	DF	(Northern Ireland) Aaron Hughes	2	0	0	0	2
11	MF	(Croatia) Silvio Marić	0	0	0	2	2
12	MF	(Scotland) Stephen Glass	1	0	0	0	1
13	MF	(Paraguay) Diego Gavilán	1	0	0	0	1
14	DF	(England) Andy Griffin	1	0	0	0	1
15	DF	(Italy) Alessandro Pistone	1	0	0	0	1
16	DF	(Portugal) Hélder	1	0	0	0	1
17	MF	(England) Rob Lee	0	1	0	0	1
18	FW	(England) Paul Robinson	0	0	0	1	1
19	MF	(Georgia (country)) (Cyprus) Temuri Ketsbaia	0	0	0	1	1
N/A	N/A	Total	63	17	0	9	89

== Matches ==
=== Pre-season ===
15 July 1999	FC Den Bosch (Netherlands)	1–2	Newcastle United	's-Hertogenbosch
19:30	van der Laan 42'		McClen 27'; Coppinger 50' (pen.)	Stadium: Ecco Stadion; Attendance: 1,700

16 July 1999	SV Deurne (Netherlands)	0–4	Newcastle United	Deurne
19:00			Shearer 39' (pen.); Barton 68'; McClen 76'; Coppinger 85'	Stadium: Sportpark Kranenmortel; Attendance: 1,200

17 July 1999	Helmond Sport (Netherlands)	1–2	Newcastle United	Helmond
19:00	Vroomans 44'		Andersson 21'; Ketsbaia 90'; Griffin (red card)	Stadium: Stadion De Braak; Attendance: 1,700

20 July 1999	Livingston (Scotland)	2–1	Newcastle United	Livingston
19:37	Bingham 24'; McManus 49'		Dyer 88'	Stadium: Almondvale Stadium; Attendance: 4,934; Referee: Ian Fyfe

22 July 1999	Dundee United (Scotland)	3–1	Newcastle United	Dundee
19:37	Dodds 7'; Paterson 20'; Jónsson 62'		Robinson 84'	Stadium: Tannadice Park; Attendance: 7,987; Referee: K. Stott

24 July 1999	Reading	2–2	Newcastle United	Reading
15:21	Caskey 9'; Williams 20'		Coppinger 62' (pen.); Robinson 81'	Stadium: Madejski Stadium; Attendance: 16,884; Referee: Dermot Gallagher

27 July 1999	Celtic (Scotland)	2–0	Newcastle United	Glasgow
19:45	Tébily 50'; Viduka 62'			Stadium: Celtic Park; Attendance: 59,252; Referee: R. Orr

28 July 1999	Stoke City	1–2	Newcastle United	Stoke-on-Trent
19:45	Jacobsen 44'		Dumas 41'; Robinson 67'	Stadium: Britannia Stadium; Attendance: 6,742; Referee: Paul Rejer

31 July 1999	VfL Bochum (Germany)	3–2	Newcastle United	Bochum
19:45	Bałuszyński 41', 63'; Schreiber 67'		Shearer 38', 56'	Stadium: Ruhrstadion; Attendance: 11,644; Referee: Markus Weber

=== FA Premier League ===
Pos	Team	Pld	W	D	L	GF	GA	GD	Pts
9	West Ham United	38	15	10	13	52	53	−1	55
10	Tottenham Hotspur	38	15	8	15	57	49	+8	53
11	Newcastle United	38	14	10	14	63	54	+9	52
12	Middlesbrough	38	14	10	14	46	52	−6	52
13	Everton	38	12	14	12	59	49	+10	50

Source: Premier League
Rules for classification: 1) points; 2) goal difference; 3) number of goals scored.

Results summary

Overall								Home						Away					
Pld	W	D	L	GF	GA	GD	Pts	W	D	L	GF	GA	GD	W	D	L	GF	GA	GD
38	14	10	14	63	54	+9	52	10	5	4	42	20	+22	4	5	10	21	34	−13

Source: 1999-2000 FA Premier League table

Results by round

Round	1	2	3	4	5	6	7	8	9	10	11	12	13	14	15	16	17	18	19	20	21	22	23	24	25	26	27	28	29	30	31	32	33	34	35	36	37	38
Ground	H	A	A	H	H	A	A	H	A	H	A	H	A	H	A	H	A	A	H	A	H	H	A	A	H	A	H	H	A	A	H	A	H	H	H	A	A	H
Result	L	L	L	D	L	L	L	W	L	W	L	W	D	D	D	W	W	L	D	W	D	W	L	D	W	W	L	W	W	L	W	L	L	D	W	D	D	W
Position	13	19	20	19	19	19	19	19	19	19	19	17	17	16	16	15	14	15	15	14	15	13	15	13	13	12	12	12	11	11	11	10	12	12	12	12	12	11

Source: 11v11.com: 1999–2000 Newcastle United results
A = Away; H = Home; W = Win; D = Draw; L = Loss

7 August 1999	Newcastle United	0–1	Aston Villa	Newcastle upon Tyne
15:00	Shearer (red card) 70'	Report	Joachim 75'	Stadium: St James' Park; Attendance: 36,376; Referee: Uriah Rennie

9 August 1999	Tottenham Hotspur	3–1	Newcastle United	London
20:00	Iversen 29'; Ferdinand 45'; Sherwood 61'	Report	Solano 16'	Stadium: White Hart Lane; Attendance: 28,701; Referee: Rob Harris

15 August 1999	Southampton	4–2	Newcastle United	Southampton
16:00	Kachloul 58', 68'; Pahars 66'; M. Hughes 78'	Report	Shearer 22' (pen.); Speed 84'	Stadium: The Dell; Attendance: 15,013; Referee: David Elleray

21 August 1999	Newcastle United	3–3	Wimbledon	Newcastle upon Tyne
15:00	Speed 7'; Domi 28'; Solano 46' (pen.)	Report	M. Hughes 44'; Ainsworth 68', 90'	Stadium: St James' Park; Attendance: 35,809; Referee: Mike Reed

25 August 1999	Newcastle United	1–2	Sunderland	Newcastle upon Tyne
19:45	Dyer 28'	Report	Quinn 64'; Phillips 75'	Stadium: St James' Park; Attendance: 36,600; Referee: Graham Poll

30 August 1999	Manchester United	5–1	Newcastle United	Manchester
13:00	Cole 14', 46', 65', 71'; Giggs 80'	Report	Berg 31' (o.g.); Dabizas (red card) 47'	Stadium: Old Trafford; Attendance: 55,190; Referee: Jeff Winter

11 September 1999	Chelsea	1–0	Newcastle United	London
15:00	Leboeuf 37' (pen.)	Report		Stadium: Stamford Bridge; Attendance: 35,092; Referee: Graham Poll

19 September 1999	Newcastle United	8–0	Sheffield Wednesday	Newcastle upon Tyne
15:00	Hughes 11'; Shearer 30', 33' (pen.), 42', 81', 84' (pen.); Dyer 46'; Speed 78'	Report		Stadium: St James' Park; Attendance: 36,619; Referee: Neale Barry

25 September 1999	Leeds United	3–2	Newcastle United	Leeds
15:00	Bowyer 11'; Kewell 39'; Bridges 77'	Report	Shearer 42', 54'	Stadium: Elland Road; Attendance: 40,192; Referee: Barry Knight

3 October 1999	Newcastle United	2–1	Middlesbrough	Newcastle upon Tyne
15:00	Shearer 17', 44'	Report	Deane 89'	Stadium: St James' Park; Attendance: 36,421; Referee: Stephen Lodge

16 October 1999	Coventry City	4–1	Newcastle United	Coventry
15:00	Palmer 13'; P Williams 21'; Keane 39'; Hadji 90'	Report	Barton (red card) 29'; Domi 81'	Stadium: Highfield Road; Attendance: 23,031; Referee: Alan Wiley

25 October 1999	Newcastle United	2–0	Derby County	Newcastle upon Tyne
20:00	Eranio 41' (o.g.); Shearer 52'	Report		Stadium: St James' Park; Attendance: 35,614; Referee: Steve Dunn

30 October 1999	Arsenal	0–0	Newcastle United	London
15:00		Report		Stadium: Highbury; Attendance: 38,106; Referee: Peter Jones

7 November 1999	Newcastle United	1–1	Everton	Newcastle upon Tyne
15:00	Shearer 46' (pen.)	Report	Campbell 62'	Stadium: St James' Park; Attendance: 36,164; Referee: Mike Reed

20 November 1999	Watford	1–1	Newcastle United	Watford
15:00	Ngonge 53'	Report	Dabizas 59'	Stadium: Vicarage Road; Attendance: 19,539; Referee: Steve Dunn

28 November 1999	Newcastle United	2–1	Tottenham Hotspur	Newcastle upon Tyne
15:00	Glass 5'; Dabizas 58'	[ Report]	Armstrong 44'	Stadium: St James' Park; Attendance: 36,460; Referee: Paul Alcock

4 December 1999	Aston Villa	0–1	Newcastle United	Birmingham
15:00		Report	Ferguson 65'	Stadium: Villa Park; Attendance: 34,531; Referee: Mike Riley

18 December 1999	Bradford City	2–0	Newcastle United	Bradford
15:00	Saunders 56'; Wetherall 71'	Report		Stadium: Valley Parade; Attendance: 18,286; Referee: Neale Barry

26 December 1999	Newcastle United	2–2	Liverpool	Newcastle upon Tyne
15:00	Shearer 12'; Ferguson 67'	Report	Owen 31', 52'	Stadium: St James' Park; Attendance: 36,445; Referee: David Elleray

28 December 1999	Leicester City	1–2	Newcastle United	Leicester
15:00	Zagorakis 83'	Report	Ferguson 21'; Shearer 53'	Stadium: Filbert Street; Attendance: 21,225; Referee: Paul Durkin

3 January 2000	Newcastle United	2–2	West Ham United	Newcastle upon Tyne
15:00	Dabizas 18'; Speed 65'	Report	Lampard 84'; Stimac 88'	Stadium: St James' Park; Attendance: 36,314; Referee: Rob Harris

16 January 2000	Newcastle United	5–0	Southampton	Newcastle upon Tyne
16:00	Ferguson 3', 4'; Solano 17'; Dryden 31' (o.g.); Dabizas 83'	[ Report]		Stadium: St James' Park; Attendance: 35,623; Referee: Neale Barry

22 January 2000	Wimbledon	2–0	Newcastle United	London
15:00	Earle 48'; Gayle 69'	Report		Stadium: Selhurst Park; Attendance: 22,118; Referee: Dermot Gallagher

5 February 2000	Sunderland	2–2	Newcastle United	Sunderland
15:00	Phillips 22', 82'	Report	Domi 11'; Helder 21'	Stadium: Stadium of Light; Attendance: 42,192; Referee: Dermot Gallagher

12 February 2000	Newcastle United	3–0	Manchester United	Newcastle upon Tyne
13:00	Ferguson 26'; Shearer 76', 86'	Report	Keane (yellow card) 43' (yellow-red card) 64'	Stadium: St James' Park; Attendance: 36,470; Referee: Stephen Lodge

26 February 2000	Sheffield Wednesday	0–2	Newcastle United	Sheffield
15:00		Report	Gallacher 11'; Shearer 86'	Stadium: Hillsborough; Attendance: 29,212; Referee: Mike Riley

4 March 2000	Newcastle United	0–1	Chelsea	Newcastle upon Tyne
15:00		Report	Poyet 22'	Stadium: St James' Park; Attendance: 36,448; Referee: Mike Riley

11 March 2000	Newcastle United	1–0	Watford	Newcastle upon Tyne
15:00	Gallacher 59'	Report		Stadium: St James' Park; Attendance: 36,433; Referee: Alan Wiley

19 March 2000	Everton	0–2	Newcastle United	Liverpool
16:00		Report	Hughes 79'; Dyer 87'	Stadium: Goodison Park; Attendance: 32,512; Referee: Graham Barber

25 March 2000	Liverpool	2–1	Newcastle United	Liverpool
15:00	Camara 51'; Redknapp 88'	Report	Shearer 67'	Stadium: Anfield; Attendance: 44,743; Referee: Paul Durkin

1 April 2000	Newcastle United	2–0	Bradford City	Newcastle upon Tyne
15:00	Speed 6'; Shearer 89'	Report		Stadium: St James' Park; Attendance: 36,572; Referee: Andy D'Urso

12 April 2000	West Ham United	2–1	Newcastle United	London
19:45	Wanchope 60', 89'	[ Report]	Speed 48'	Stadium: Upton Park; Attendance: 25,817; Referee: Paul Alcock

15 April 2000	Newcastle United	0–2	Leicester City	Newcastle upon Tyne
15:00		Report	Cottee 7'; Savage 52'	Stadium: St James' Park; Attendance: 36,426; Referee: Uriah Rennie

23 April 2000	Newcastle United	2–2	Leeds United	Newcastle upon Tyne
15:00	Shearer 24', 48'	Report	Bridges 12'; Wilcox 17'	Stadium: St James' Park; Attendance: 36,460; Referee: David Elleray

29 April 2000	Newcastle United	2–0	Coventry City	Newcastle upon Tyne
15:00	Shearer 78' (pen.); Gavilan 84'	Report		Stadium: St James' Park; Attendance: 36,408; Referee: Peter Jones

2 May 2000	Middlesbrough	2–2	Newcastle United	Middlesbrough
19:45	Juninho 5'; Festa 78'	Report	Speed 10'; Pistone 18'	Stadium: Riverside Stadium; Attendance: 34,744; Referee: Mike Riley

6 May 2000	Derby County	0–0	Newcastle United	Derby
15:00		Report		Stadium: Pride Park; Attendance: 32,724; Referee: Alan Wiley

14 May 2000	Newcastle United	4–2	Arsenal	Newcastle upon Tyne
16:00	Speed 6', 59'; Shearer 23'; Griffin 63'	Report	Kanu 7'; Malz 53'	Stadium: St James' Park; Attendance: 36,450; Referee: Graham Poll

=== UEFA Cup ===
16 September 1999 R1 1st leg	CSKA Sofia (Bulgaria)	0–2	(England) Newcastle United	Sofia
20:45		Report	Solano 51'; Ketsbaia 77'	Stadium: Balgarska Armiya Stadium; Attendance: 25,000; Referee: Juan Rocca (Spain)

30 September 1999 R1 2nd leg	Newcastle United (England)	2–2 (4–2 agg.)	(Bulgaria) CSKA Sofia	Newcastle upon Tyne
20:00	Shearer 36'; Robinson 88'	Report	Litera 29'; Simeonov 90'	Stadium: St James' Park; Attendance: 36,228; Referee: Luc Huyghe (Belgium)

21 October 1999 R2 1st leg	FC Zürich (Switzerland)	1–2	(England) Newcastle United	Zürich
19:45	Castillo 68'	Report	Marić 51'; Shearer 60'	Stadium: Letzigrund; Attendance: 9,600; Referee: Jacek Granat (Poland)

4 November 1999 R2 2nd leg	Newcastle United (England)	3–1 (5–2 agg.)	(Switzerland) FC Zürich	Newcastle upon Tyne
20:00	Marić 33'; Ferguson 58'; Speed 61'	Report	Jamarauli 17'	Stadium: St James' Park; Attendance: 34,502; Referee: Domenico Messina (Italy)

25 November 1999 R3 1st leg	Roma (Italy)	1–0	(England) Newcastle United	Rome
20:15	Totti 51' (pen.)	Report		Stadium: Stadio Olimpico; Attendance: 45,655; Referee: Claude Colombo (France)

9 December 1999 R3 1st leg	Newcastle United (England)	0–0 (0–1 agg.)	(Italy) Roma	Newcastle upon Tyne
20:15		Report		Stadium: St James' Park; Attendance: 35,739; Referee: Hartmut Stampe (Germany)

=== FA Cup ===
12 December 1999 Round 3	Tottenham Hotspur	1–1	Newcastle United	London
16:00	Iversen 57'	Report	Speed 77'	Stadium: White Hart Lane; Attendance: 33,116; Referee: Graham Poll

22 December 1999 Round 3R	Newcastle United	6–1	Tottenham Hotspur	Newcastle upon Tyne
19:45	Speed 5'; Dabizas 27'; Ferguson 45'; Dyer 73'; Shearer 83' (pen.), 85'	Report	Ginola 34'	Stadium: St James' Park; Attendance: 35,415; Referee: Graham Poll

8 January 2000 Round 4	Newcastle United	4–1	Sheffield United	Newcastle upon Tyne
15:00	Shearer 5'; Dabizas 47'; Ferguson 59'; Gallacher 69'	Report	Smith 34'	Stadium: St James' Park; Attendance: 36,220; Referee: Mark Halsey

31 January 2000 Round 5	Blackburn Rovers	1–2	Newcastle United	Blackburn
20:00	Jansen 25'	Report	Shearer 21', 79'	Stadium: Ewood Park; Attendance: 36,220; Referee: Paul Durkin

20 February 2000 Round 6	Tranmere Rovers	2–3	Newcastle United	Tranmere
14:00	Allison 45'; Jones 76'	Report	Speed 27'; Domi 36'; Ferguson 58'	Stadium: Prenton Park; Attendance: 15,776; Referee: Steve Dunn

9 April 2000 Semi-final	Newcastle United	1–2	Chelsea	London
14:00	Lee 66'	Report	Poyet 17', 72'	Stadium: Wembley; Attendance: 73,876; Referee: Dermot Gallagher

=== League Cup ===
12 October 1999 Round 3	Birmingham City	2–0	Newcastle United	Birmingham
19:45	O'Connor 45' (pen.); Purse 60'	Report	Harper (red card) 45'	Stadium: St Andrew's; Attendance: 19,795; Referee: Uriah Rennie
