= Choppington =

Village in Northumberland, England

Coordinates: 55.145°N 1.601°W

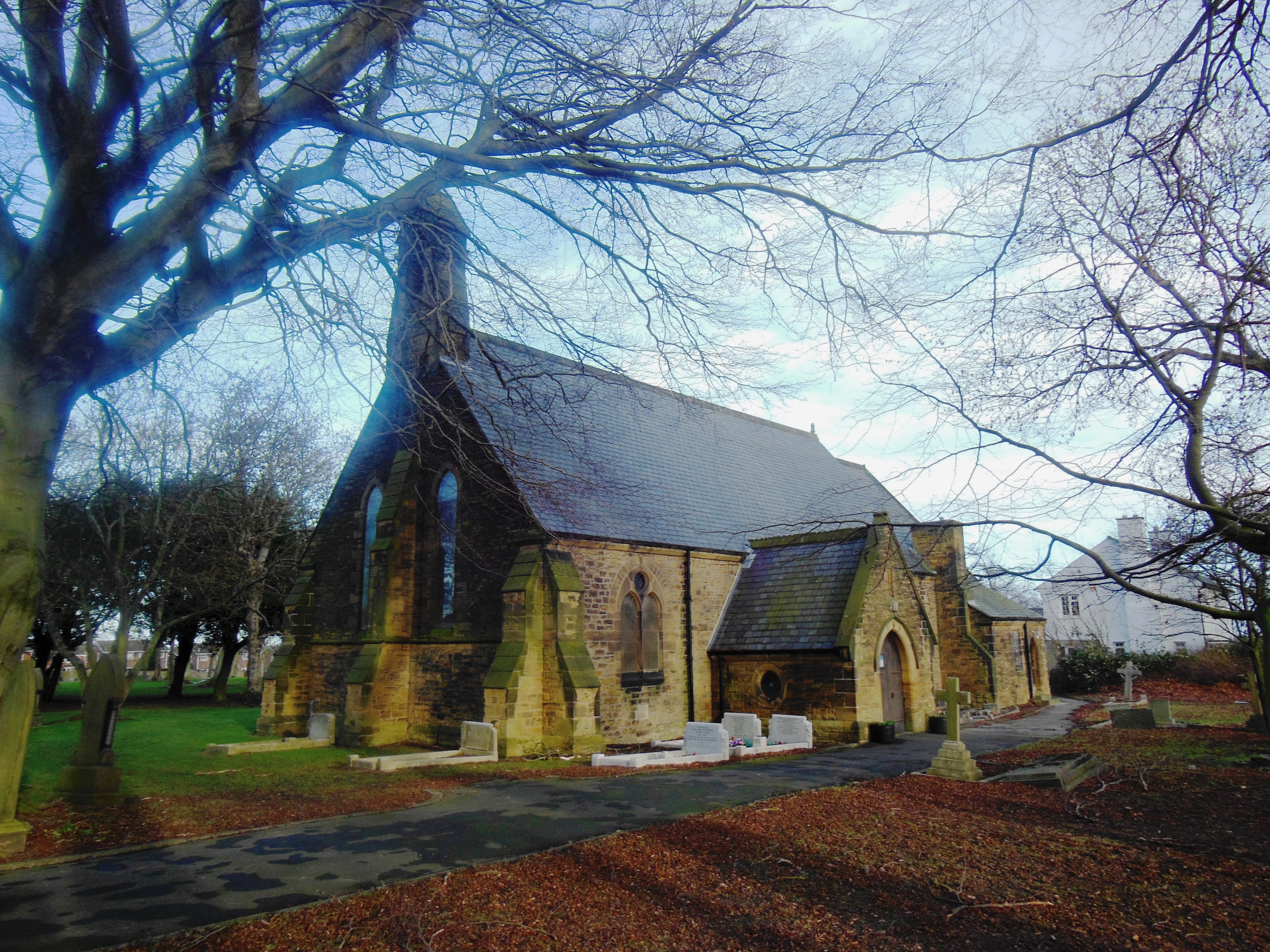

- Location within Northumberland
- Population: 9,787 (2011)
- OS grid reference: NZ255835
- Civil parish: Choppington
- Unitary authority: Northumberland
- Ceremonial county: Northumberland
- Region: North East
- Country: England
- Sovereign state: United Kingdom
- Post town: CHOPPINGTON
- Postcode district: NE62
- Police: Northumbria
- Fire: Northumberland
- Ambulance: North East
- UK Parliament: Wansbeck

Choppington is a large village and civil parish in Northumberland, England. It is situated 5 miles to the south-east of Morpeth, and north of Bedlington. It was at one time part of the three big mid-Northumberland collieries (Ashington, Bomarsund and Choppington). In 2011 the parish had a population of 9787.

The parish, which was until 1 July 2010 called North Bedlington, was created on 1 April 2009 also includes the settlements of Bomarsund, Guide Post, Stakeford, Sheepwash, Scotland Gate and West Sleekburn.

== Governance ==
An electoral ward exists. the population of this ward at the 2011 Census was 4,792.
