= History of Bradford City A.F.C. =

History of an English football club

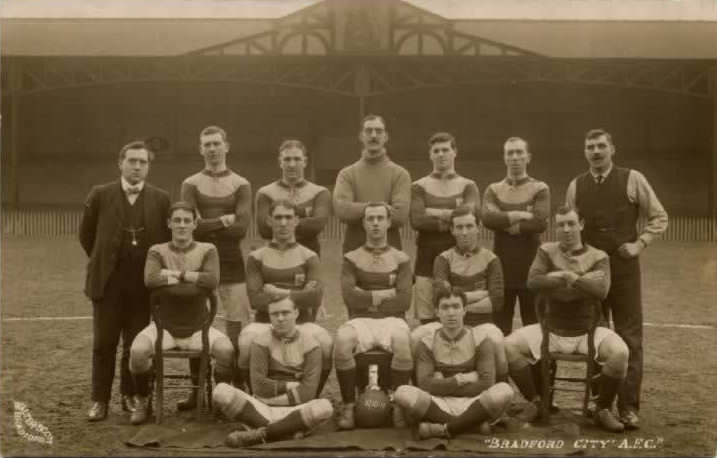
Bradford City's 1911 FA Cup winning side

Bradford City Association Football Club—also known informally as Bradford City—is an English football club founded in Bradford in 1903 to introduce the sport to the West Riding of Yorkshire, which until then had been almost entirely inclined towards rugby league. Before they had even played their first game, City were elected to the Football League to replace Doncaster Rovers in Division Two, and took over the Valley Parade stadium, which has been their permanent home ground ever since. The club won the Division Two title in 1908 and the FA Cup in 1911, both under the management of Peter O'Rourke, before they were relegated from Division One in 1921–22.

City were relegated again five seasons later, but when O'Rourke was reappointed as manager before the 1928–29 season, they broke several club records to earn promotion back to Division Two. After eight seasons in Division Two, City returned to Division Three, and they remained in the third and fourth tiers of the English football league system until 1985–86. During that time, they endured several periods of financial hardship, and in 1985, their ground suffered a disastrous fire in which 56 people died, on a day the club and their fans were supposed to be celebrating promotion.

In 1987–88, the club came close to returning to the top division when they missed out on promotion on the final day of the season. Following relegation back to Division Three, after Geoffrey Richmond became chairman in January 1994 the club's fortunes were lifted. He helped to take them to their first appearance at Wembley and subsequently into the Premier League, where they played for two seasons. Following Richmond's self-proclaimed "six weeks of madness" and the collapse of television channel ITV Digital, the club suffered its first spell in administration. Another period under administration followed, and City dropped through the leagues of professional English football back to the bottom tier of The Football League, until promotion in 2012–13 brought them back up a division. In January 2013, City became the first club from the fourth tier of English football since 1962 to reach the Football League Cup final.

== Early successes (1903–1919) ==
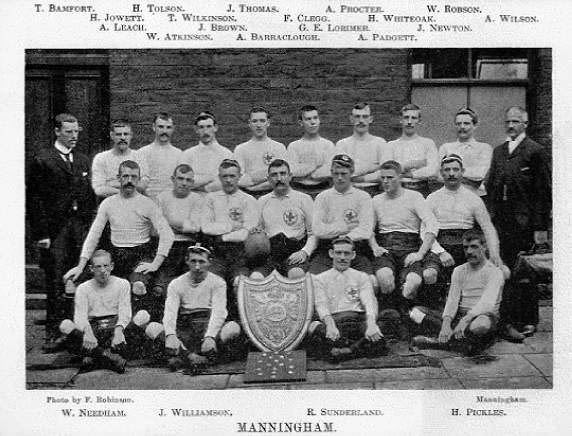
Manningham F.C., the first rugby league champions in the world in 1896, who were later to switch codes to become Bradford City A.F.C.

League football was established in the West Riding of Yorkshire in 1894 when the West Yorkshire League was formed. A year later the Bradford Schools Football and Athletic Association abandoned its rugby roots to adopt the association football code. Several clubs across Bradford, including Bradford (Park Avenue), also adopted the code during the latter years of the 19th century. By 1901, a team called Bradford City had played in the leagues within the city, playing for two seasons, but disbanded at the end of the 1902–03 season. On 30 January 1903, Scotsman James Whyte, a sub-editor of the Bradford Observer, met with Football Association representative John Brunt at Valley Parade, the home of Manningham Football Club, to discuss establishing a Football League club within the city. Manningham FC were a rugby league club formed in 1880 and became a founding member of the Northern Rugby Football Union in 1895. A series of meetings was held, and on 29 May 1903, at the 23rd annual meeting of Manningham FC, the committee decided to leave the rugby code and switch to association football. The Football League, which saw the invitation as a chance to introduce football to the rugby league-dominated area of the West Riding, elected the club, which had been renamed Bradford City, to the league with a total of 30 votes to replace Doncaster Rovers.

Bradford City became the first league football team from the county, before they even had a team or played a game. They and Chelsea, who were elected to the league two years later, share the distinction of being the only clubs to join the league without having played a competitive fixture. A summer archery contest, which had been organised to raise money for the rugby league club, was used to finance the new club, and Manningham's colours of claret and amber were adopted as Bradford City's kit, but with Manningham's hoops changed to stripes.

Robert Campbell was appointed by a 13-man sub-committee to be the club's first secretary-manager from a shortlist of 30 applicants. Secretarial duties were carried out by committee member Whyte, with Campbell's role more on the playing side. The committee assembled a squad at the cost of £917 10s 0d. Their first game was a 2–0 defeat away at Grimsby Town on 1 September 1903, and first home game was six days later against Gainsborough Trinity, played in front of a crowd of 11,000 including the Lord Mayor and Lady Mayoress of Bradford. It was not until the third game against Burton United that the club recorded their first victory, on the way to a 10th-place finish in Division Two. The club faced having to apply for re-election in their second season, until five wins in the final six games lifted the club to eighth position. In November 1905, Peter O'Rourke, one of the club's centre-halves, was appointed manager, with his last game as a player coming the following month. He guided City to finishes of 11th and fifth and then earned promotion to Division One in 1907–08. The season had started with an 8–1 victory over Chesterfield and included another six victories when City scored five goals or more, before promotion and then the title were assured with successive victories over Derby County and Burnley in April.

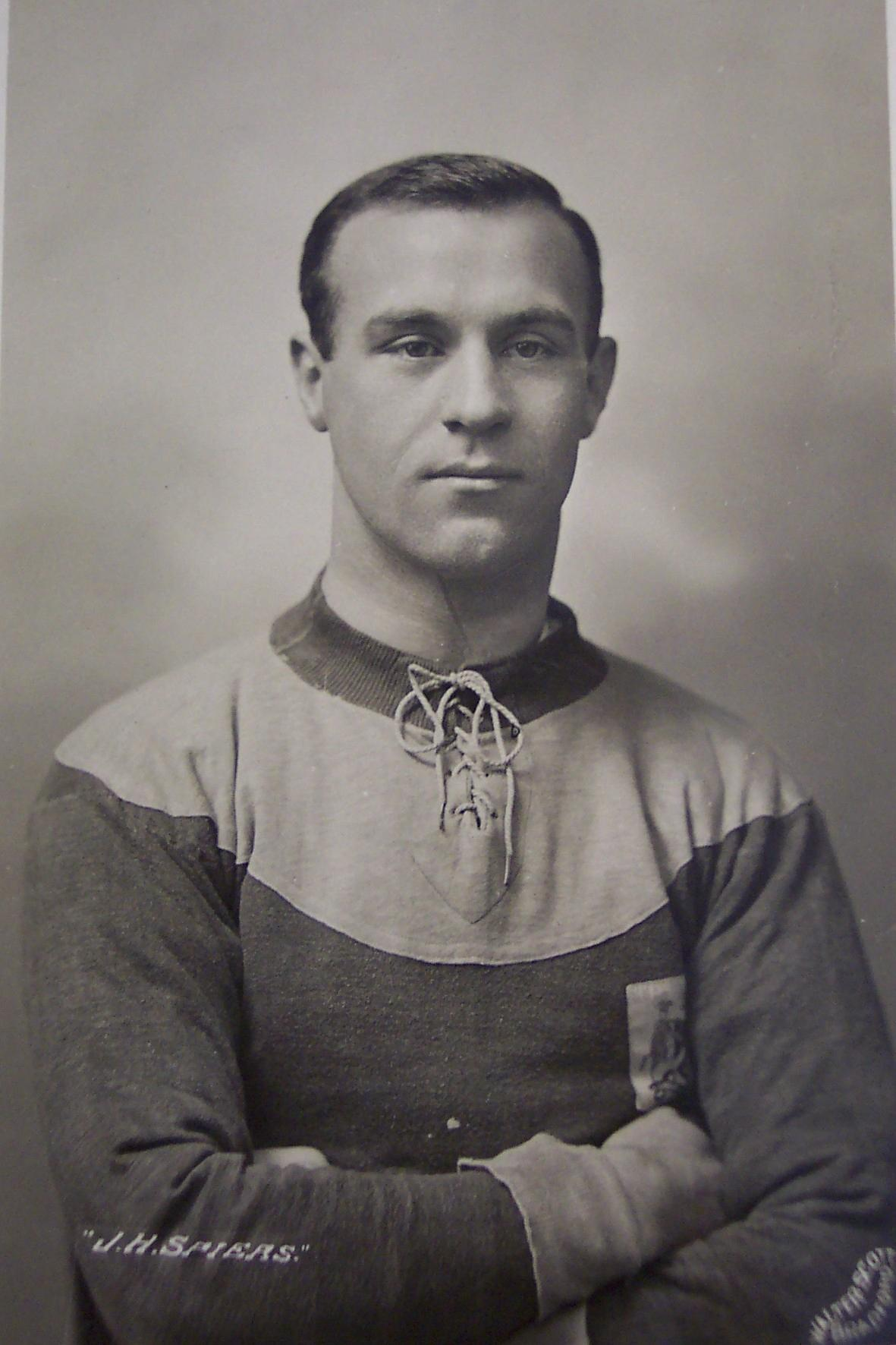
Bradford City's 1911 FA Cup Final winning goalscorer Jimmy Speirs

Ahead of their first campaign in Division One, Bradford City embarked upon their first continental tour; despite victories over German side Aachen and Belgian club Verviers, the club's first league victory in the top division did not come until the fifth attempt with a 4–1 defeat of Bury. It was their only win in the first 14 games. Results improved in the second half of the season but it was not until a 1–0 win on the final game of the season against Manchester United with a goal from Frank O'Rourke that City prevented an immediate relegation back to Division Two. The following season included a ten-game undefeated spell as Bradford finished seventh, but this was bettered in the 1910–11 season, which is Bradford City's most successful campaign. Their league finish of fifth remains the club's highest position, and an FA Cup triumph, with a 1–0 win over Newcastle United in the 1911 final is the club's only major honour. The first- and third-round victories were secured with solitary goals from Dicky Bond, but he missed the final four games of the run because of club suspension, the first of which was a 1–0 defeat of Burnley in the fourth round in front of 39,146 fans, a crowd which remains Valley Parade's highest attendance. The biggest win of the run came in the semi-finals with a 3–0 victory over Blackburn Rovers. City's supporters were taken to the final in London on 11 special trains, but the game with Newcastle at Crystal Palace ended in a goalless draw and was even described as a "decidedly dull and uneventful game". The draw meant a replay was necessary. It took place four days later on 26 April 1911 at Old Trafford, Manchester, when a single goal from Jimmy Speirs in the 15th minute gave Bradford a 1–0 victory. They were the first winners of a new trophy, appropriately made by Bradford jewellers Fattorini's.

Bradford's defence of the FA Cup was ended in the fourth round by Barnsley, who went on to succeed Bradford as the holders. The 3–2 defeat, played at Bramall Lane, Sheffield, following two draws, brought an end to 11 consecutive clean sheets in the FA Cup—a competition record. The sequence also included a 12th clean sheet in the second replay against Barnsley which was abandoned because of crowd trouble. The cup run had included the first Bradford derby between City and cross-city rivals Bradford (Park Avenue). In the league, City finished 11th, the first of four consecutive mid-table finishes before league football was suspended because of the First World War. City's FA Cup hero Speirs, who had joined Leeds City, was one of many footballers to lose his life during the war. Bradford City players who died included Bob Torrance, another FA Cup winner, and Evelyn Lintott, as well as several reserve team players. Frank Buckley and Jock Ewart were seriously wounded, and Dicky Bond was taken prisoner-of-war. In 1921, Bond laid a commemorative wreath on the Cenotaph in memory of his fallen colleagues prior to a league game at Arsenal.

== Inter-war years (1919–1938) ==
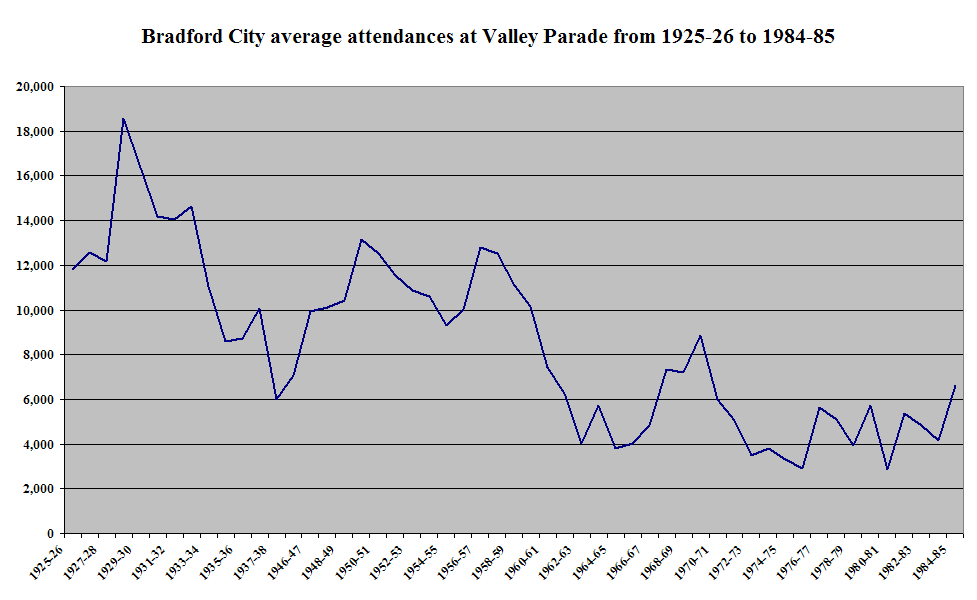
Attendances at Valley Parade dropped from a high in 1928–1929 until the Second World War and fluctuated until the fire in 1985.

With several retirements during the war, it was a new-look side that took to the field for the 1919–20 season, when league football resumed. The 15th-place finish in the league was City's lowest since their first season in Division One, and a fourth-round FA Cup exit away at Bristol City was blamed on a pre-game trip to Fry's chocolate works. It was a position replicated the following season. After ten campaigns in Division One, City were relegated back to Division Two, when they lost all of their final five games of the 1921–22 season. It would be 77 years until Bradford City again competed in the top division of English football.

Having lost O'Rourke as manager in 1921, after he had struggled to cope with the death of his son two years earlier, Bradford's results suffered back in Division Two. Both Bradford City and Bradford (Park Avenue) had been relegated in 1922, and with the rise of fellow West Yorkshire side Huddersfield Town, attendances in Bradford dropped. City's average attendance fell from a record high of 22,585 in 1920–21 to between 12,000 and 14,000 in Division Two. Five consecutive bottom half finishes culminated in relegation to Division Three (North) in 1926–27, when they finished bottom of the table following a then record 8–0 defeat to Manchester City on the final day of the season. New manager Colin Veitch missed out on guiding the club to an immediate promotion when they finished sixth, but at the end of the season the players had not been paid and the bank was unable to advance any more money because of the club's overdraft. Had it not been for donations by fans, Bradford City would not have started the following campaign. A new board was appointed, and they reinstated Peter O'Rourke as manager. Success was immediate, when the 1928–29 season started with a record 11–1 victory over Rotherham United, as the side scored a club record 128 goals to earn promotion by just one point. City's successful team had also brought the fans back and the average attendance of 18,551 is the highest average recorded by the club, since 1925, when The Football League started to keep official records.

O'Rourke left for a second time in May 1930, after he resigned because he was not allowed to sign a player he wanted. City spent eight seasons back in Division Two but the nearest they came to stepping up to the top flight was in 1933–34 when at one point they topped the division. Their sixth-place finish was the highest position since the club had been in Division One and would not be bettered until the 1980s. Relegation back to Division Three (North) came in 1936–37. City were runners-up in the Division Three North Challenge Cup a year later before they won the same competition in the last year before league football was again suspended because of war.

== Lower divisions (1946–1981) ==
New manager Jack Barker lasted just eight months until he was replaced by former Leeds United player Jack Milburn upon the resumption of league football in 1946. Milburn led City to fifth position in his first season but only lasted another season himself. With only one team promoted from Division Three (North) each season, City remained at that level until they were placed in Division Three in 1958–59 after a league re-organisation, following a 20-year high position of third the previous season. In 1960, eight years after part of the ground's Midland Road stand had been closed following examinations of the foundations ordered as a result of the 1946 Burnden Park disaster, the entire stand was closed, leaving the ground with just three stands. After just three years in Division Three, City dropped into Division Four in 1960–61, although that season they did defeat Division One side Manchester United in City's first ever League Cup tie. United, like many other top flight clubs, would not enter the competition again until six years later.

Despite a club record 9–1 defeat to Colchester United on 30 December 1961, City came fifth in 1961–62, thanks to David Layne's 34 league goals—his total remains a club record for a season—but missed out on promotion by just one point. Layne left for Sheffield Wednesday and City finished 23rd the following season, forcing them to apply for re-election. In 1966, the club directors moved the pitch 2.74 metres (3.00 yd) closer to the main stand, creating enough space for them to add a new safe standing area on the Midland Road side of the ground and open all four stands for the first time since 1960. Attendances continued to drop and a new record low of 1,353 was set on 12 May 1966 against Wrexham. It prompted chairman Stafford Heginbotham to hold a crisis meeting in the city's St George's Hall to raise new funds and safeguard the future of the club. The club's indifferent form on the field continued, with another re-election and two narrow promotion failures, before promotion was gained in 1968–69. Only the previous season, City had had three managers, when Grenville Hair, who had replaced Willie Watson, died just two months into his reign, after he collapsed at the end of a training session.

Striker Bobby Ham, whose 18 goals had helped City into Division Three, was again top goalscorer the following season, but the club's stint in Division Three was short-lived. Once Ham, and fellow Bradford-born striker Bruce Bannister, who scored 60 goals during seven seasons with the club, both left, City were relegated back into the bottom division in 1971–72. The spell in Division Three had also been notable for the debut of Ces Podd, who went on to play a record 502 league games during 14 seasons with the club. City spent five seasons back in Division Four. In 1975–76 they had their best FA Cup run in more than 50 years after defeating Norwich City, before they were knocked out in the quarter-finals by eventual winners Southampton 1–0. A year later more than 40 goals from the trio of Dominican striker Joe Cooke, Terry Dolan and Don Hutchins helped City to another promotion when they finished in fourth position. The club's board failed to strengthen the squad the following season, resulting in an instant return to Division Four. Under new manager George Mulhall, City spent three seasons in mid-table, although a late spell of form nearly earned promotion in 1979–1980.

== Bantam progressivism (1981–1990) ==
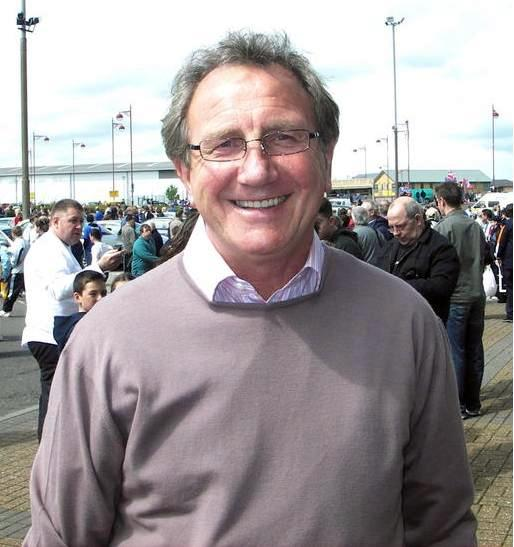
Roy McFarland guided City to promotion in 1981–82 as player-manager before he was poached by Derby County.

In May 1981, City appointed former England international defender Roy McFarland as their new manager. After starting the 1981–82 season with a defeat and a draw, City went top of the table during a run of nine successive league victories, equalling a 30-year club record. The run came to an end against Sheffield United in front of 13,711 fans at Valley Parade, producing then club record gate receipts of £17,938. Arctic conditions across Britain meant City played only once during December, but they went back to the top of the Division Four table in January. City finished the season second, five points behind Sheffield United, and were promoted back to Division Three. Three months into the following campaign, McFarland and his assistant Mick Jones handed in their resignation and left for Derby County. Derby had to pay a large fine and compensation to City for poaching the pair. Chairman Bob Martin turned to another England centre-back and appointed Trevor Cherry as McFarland's replacement from West Yorkshire rivals Leeds United. Cherry and assistant Terry Yorath continued to build on McFarland's start to the period which would later be called "Bantam Progressivism" by fanzine The City Gent. Despite not recording their first win for more than two months, the pair guided City to 12th position.

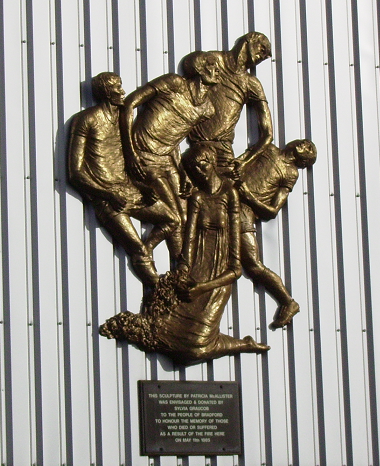
A memorial, erected on the club's new main stand, to the victims of the fire in 1985

The club were again in financial difficulties, and in June 1983, Martin called in the receivers and the club was put up for sale. A Save Bradford City Fund was launched on 24 July, and former chairman Stafford Heginbotham and former board member Jack Tordoff bought the club, forming a new company, and enabling the team to start the new league campaign. Centre forward Bobby Campbell was sold to Derby County to balance the books and John Hawley brought in as his replacement. City struggled on the pitch and won just one of their first 15 games leaving them in the relegation zone. Campbell had played just 11 games during four months with Derby and so he returned to Bradford initially on a loan transfer. His return coincided with a club record ten successive league victories. Campbell finished the season with nine goals, Hawley with 22, but City finished seventh and missed out on promotion.

The good form continued the following season, and from October to mid-December 1984, City embarked on a 13-match unbeaten run, during which time Campbell became the club's all-time leading goalscorer, beating Frank O'Rourke's 70-year-old record. City went top of the division and held onto their lead, opening an 11-point cushion by February. Promotion was secured in April and the club's first championship title since 1929 after a 2–0 win over Bolton Wanderers. The success was overshadowed when fire ripped through Valley Parade's main stand 40 minutes into the final game of the season on 11 May 1985 against Lincoln City. A total of 56 people died and the club did not play another game at Valley Parade for nearly 20 months.

City instead played home games at Elland Road, Leeds Road and Odsal during the 1985–86 season, when they came 13th, and for the first half of the 1986–87 campaign. They returned to Valley Parade, which had undergone a £2.6m redevelopment, on Boxing Day 1986 against Derby County. After managing the side during the financial hardship and time away from their home ground, Cherry was dismissed only ten days after the return to Valley Parade. Club coach Terry Dolan was appointed as manager and he led the side away from relegation and to a finish of 10th place. By September 1987, Dolan's side topped Division Two for the first time in 54 years. They finished fourth after a final day defeat to Ipswich Town and missed out on promotion after they lost to Middlesbrough in the play-offs. Leading players Stuart McCall and John Hendrie, who had both stayed for another season in a bid to take City into Division One, both left, and within two seasons City again dropped into Division Three. In January 1988 Stafford Heginbotham resigned as the club's Chairman due to ill health.

== Richmond era and administration (1990 onwards) ==
"Helping the club into the top flight is a dream I have had for a long time. Dreams don't always come true, but I have been fortunate that so many of mine in football have been fulfilled, but this is the biggest one of all."

— Stuart McCall, following promotion to the Premier League

For three seasons, City finished in mid-table in Division Three and the new Division Two, when the leagues were renamed following the formation of the Premier League. In January 1994, Geoffrey Richmond took over as chairman. He cleared the debts, loaned the club £2.3 million, and promised the fans he would take the club to the Premier League within five years. In his first season as chairman, the club finished in seventh place with Frank Stapleton as manager. Stapleton was sacked and was replaced by Lennie Lawrence. Lawrence could only finish 14th in his first season, before he left for Luton Town in November 1995 to be replaced by his assistant Chris Kamara.

Kamara secured a play-off spot with a final day victory over Hull City, before City defeated Blackpool in the play-off semi-finals. The final against Notts County was City's first game at Wembley. Goals from Des Hamilton and Mark Stallard gave them a 2–0 win, which secured promotion to Division One. Kamara used 42 players in 1996–97 when City avoided relegation with a 3–0 victory in the final game against Queens Park Rangers. Kamara was sacked in January 1998 after an FA Cup defeat to Manchester City, when Richmond claimed the manager had taken the club as far as he could. Richmond again elevated from within and Paul Jewell, who had been at the club since 1988, was installed as manager, originally on a caretaker basis. He was appointed full-time in May 1998 and Richmond backed his new appointment with a multi-million transfer budget. Jewell signed strikers Lee Mills, from Port Vale and Isaiah Rankin, from Arsenal, for £1 million and £1.3 million respectively, and signed former captain Stuart McCall from Rangers on a free transfer to lead the side. Despite a poor start, the club secured promotion to the top division for the first time in 77 years with a 3–2 victory over Wolverhampton Wanderers in the final game of the 1998–99 season.

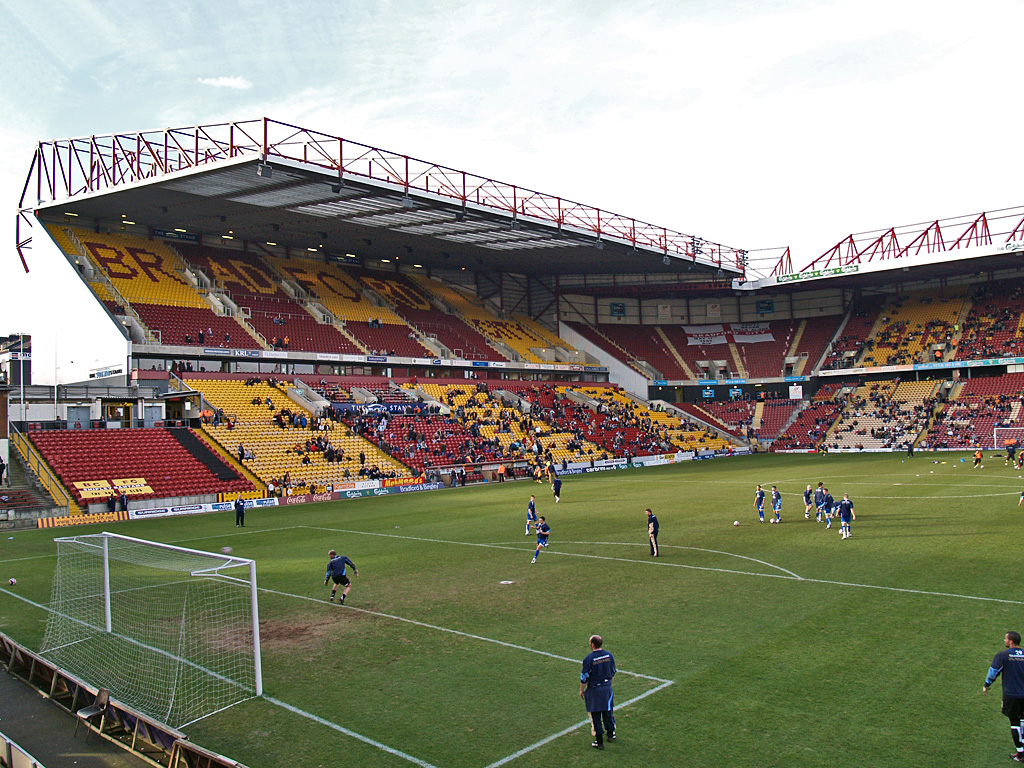
The main stand of Bradford City's Valley Parade ground, which was redeveloped and opened in 2001

City's success meant that Dean Windass, who had signed from Oxford United in March, became the club's third £1 million signing of the season. Windass had originally been signed for £950,000, but an additional fee of £50,000 was paid to Oxford because of City's promotion. Jewell broke the club's transfer record to add a fourth seven-figure signing when he paid £1.4 million to Leeds United for David Wetherall. Jewell added other senior players including Neil Redfearn and Dean Saunders, prompting the media to call his team "Dad's Army". When City defeated Middlesbrough 1–0 with a late goal from Saunders, his goal celebration mocked the critics' comments. City failed to win another game until their eighth game of the season, and Sky Sports pundit Rodney Marsh said they would be relegated and promised to shave off his hair at a home game if they avoided such a fate. A run of nine home games without defeat and consecutive victories in April gave City hope of avoiding relegation on the final day of the season. A final day 1–0 victory over Liverpool, with a goal from Wetherall, who had played every minute of the season, and Wimbledon's defeat at Southampton, meant City survived with a then record low of 36 points.

Less than two months after City stayed up, Jewell left to join Sheffield Wednesday, to be replaced by his assistant, Chris Hutchings. The club entered the Intertoto Cup, the first time they had competed in a European competition, in which they were defeated by FC Zenit Saint Petersburg in the semi-finals. Richmond gave Hutchings more money than Jewell to spend in the transfer market, and Bradford paid a club record £2.5 million for David Hopkin and £1.5 million for Ashley Ward, and signed Italian striker Benito Carbone on wages of £40,000 per week. Richmond also continued to re-develop the ground, which increased the capacity to 25,136, but later referred to his spending as his "six weeks of madness". In their second season in the Premier League, City struggled for form and Hutchings was sacked after a start to the season in which he recorded just one victory from 12 league games. Under new manager Jim Jefferies, the club were unable to avoid relegation, which was confirmed with a 2–1 defeat at Everton, when they missed two penalties, before finishing the season with just 26 points.

A graph showing Bradford City's league positions

Jefferies was sacked in December 2001 following a training ground rift with captain McCall. Nicky Law was appointed his successor, and the club finished the season in 15th place. During the summer, with debts of nearly £13 million—as a result of the collapse of ITV Digital and the fall-out from Richmond's self-proclaimed "six weeks of madness"—the club were forced into administration. The players were all released, but Carbone waived much of the money owed to him, to help the club survive under new owners Julian Rhodes and Gordon Gibb. City fulfilled their fixtures during the 2002–03 season but finished 19th.

Former England captain Bryan Robson took over as new manager during the following season, but, under his management, City won only seven games from 28 and were relegated in 23rd place. Robson left and was replaced by his assistant Colin Todd. The club went into administration for a second time, but Todd led them to 11th in each of the following two seasons. Following fan pressure and a poor run of results, Rhodes sacked Todd on 12 February 2007, with City just three points above the relegation zone. Wetherall was appointed player-manager on a temporary basis and then for the rest of the season, but City were relegated following a 3–0 defeat to Chesterfield. During the summer of 2007, former midfielder Stuart McCall returned as manager with City in the bottom tier for the first time in 25 years. He set himself a target of earning promotion back to League One in his first season, but twice missed out on promotion before he left the club in February 2010 with City lying 16th in League Two.

In January 2013, City became the first club from the fourth tier of English football since Rochdale in 1962 to reach the Football League Cup final, and the first fourth tier club ever to reach a major cup final at Wembley. They defeated three Premier League sides en route to the final – Wigan Athletic 4–2 on penalties in the fourth round, Arsenal 3–2 on penalties in the quarter-finals and Aston Villa 4–3 on aggregate over the two legs of the semi-final. They met Premier League side Swansea City in the final at Wembley, but lost 0–5. In May 2013, the club returned to Wembley where they defeated Northampton Town 3–0 in the League Two play-off final to secure a place in League One for 2013–14. On 24 January 2015, Bradford City caused an upset by beating Premier League leaders Chelsea 4–2 away in the FA Cup. The victory sent Bradford through to the fifth round for the first time in 18 years. There, they defeated another top-flight team, Sunderland, to reach their first FA Cup quarter-final since 1976, in front of their biggest home crowd for 50 years. Bradford were eliminated in the quarter-final by Reading after a replay.

The team finished in last place in the 2018–19 campaign and were relegated back to League Two.

In December 2021 the club was approached by American investors known as WAGMI United (who use cryptocurrency and NFTs) about a possible buyout. The offer was rejected.

On 24 February 2022, former Wales manager Mark Hughes was appointed manager of the club on a contract until the summer of 2024.
