= Bomarsund =

Bomarsund may refer to:

- Bomarsund, Åland, fortress in the Åland Islands, in the Baltic Sea
- Bomarsund, Northumberland, village in Northumberland, England
