= Cominelli =

Cominelli is an Italian surname. Notable people with the surname include:

- Andrea Cominelli, 17th-century Italian stonemason, sculptor, and architect
- Lucas Cominelli (born 1976), Argentine footballer
- Severo Cominelli (1915–1998), Italian footballer
