= Sheepwash, Northumberland =

Village in Northumberland, England

Coordinates: 55.163°N 1.601°W

Sheepwash
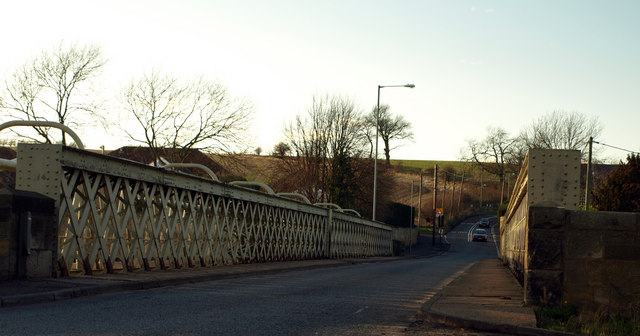
- Sheepwash Bridge

- Location within Northumberland
- OS grid reference: NZ255855
- Civil parish: Ashington
- Unitary authority: Northumberland
- Ceremonial county: Northumberland
- Region: North East
- Country: England
- Sovereign state: United Kingdom
- Post town: CHOPPINGTON
- Postcode district: NE62
- Dialling code: 01670
- Police: Northumbria
- Fire: Northumberland
- Ambulance: North East
- UK Parliament: Wansbeck

Sheepwash is a village and former civil parish, now in the parish of Ashington, in the county of Northumberland, England. It is adjacent to Stakeford and Guide Post and across the River Wansbeck from Ashington. In 1931 the parish had a population of 68.

== Governance ==
The parish was formed on 31 March 1896 when Ashington and Sheepwash was abolished and split to form separate parishes, on 1 April 1935 the parish was abolished and merged with Ashington.
