= Richard Huxford =

English footballer (born 1969)

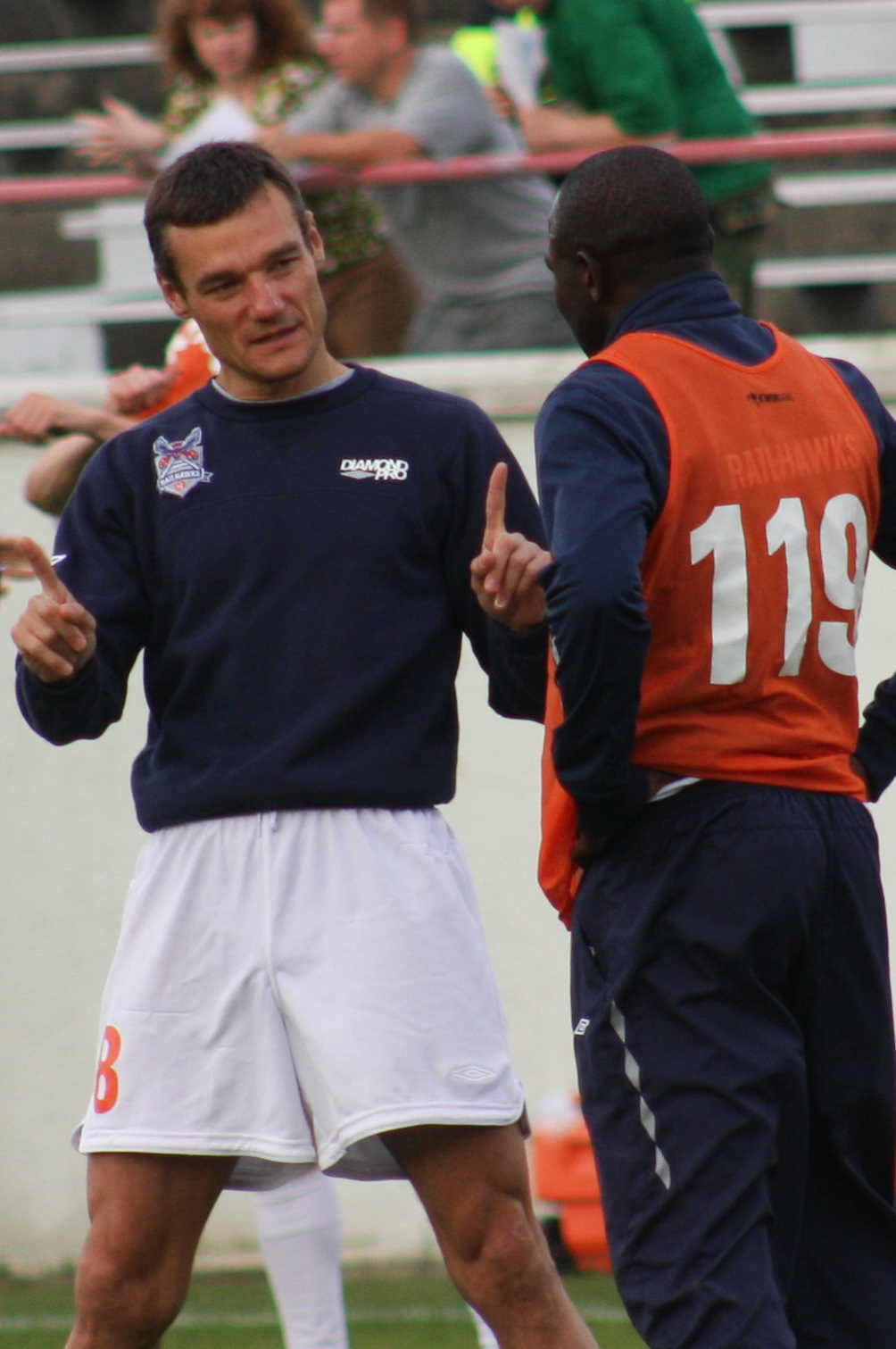
- Huxford (left) with Hamed Diallo during his days coaching at Carolina RailHawks in April 2009

Personal information
- Full name: Richard John Huxford
- Date of birth: 25 July 1969 (age 57)
- Place of birth: Scunthorpe, England
- Height: 5 ft 10 in (1.78 m)
- Position: Right back

Youth career
- Scunthorpe United

Senior career*
Years	Team	Apps	(Gls)
1987–1989	Matlock Town		
1989	Burton Albion		
1989–1990	Gainsborough Trinity		
1990–1992	Kettering Town		
1992–1993	Barnet	33	(1)
1993–1995	Millwall	32	(0)
1994	→ Birmingham City (loan)	5	(0)
1994–1995	→ Bradford City (loan)	14	(1)
1995–1997	Bradford City	47	(1)
1996	→ Peterborough United (loan)	7	(0)
1997–1998	Burnley	13	(0)
1998	→ Dunfermline Athletic (loan)	10	(0)
1998–2000	Dunfermline Athletic	27	(1)
2000–2001	Alloa Athletic	17	(0)
2001	Partick Thistle	6	(0)
2001–2002	Berwick Rangers	14	(0)
2003	Ely City	5	(0)
2006–2007	Elgin City	1	(0)
- * Club domestic league appearances and goals

Richard John Huxford (born 25 July 1969) is an English former professional footballer who made more than 200 appearances in the Football League and the Scottish Football League. His regular playing position was at right back, but he also played as a central defender or in midfield.

== Playing career ==
Huxford was born in Scunthorpe, Lincolnshire. As a youngster he joined Scunthorpe United as an apprentice, but was released without being offered a full professional contract. He played non-league football for several years, for clubs including Matlock Town, Burton Albion – whose manager met Gresley Rovers' interest in Huxford with a demand for a transfer fee, despite suggesting the player would "have to improve a great deal" to find his way into Burton's long-term plans – Gainsborough Trinity, and Kettering Town, for whom he played 103 games in all competitions.

He moved into the Football League with Barnet in August 1992 in an exchange deal involving Dave Tomlinson. After 33 league games in the 1992–93 season as Barnet won the Division Three title, Huxford joined Division One (second tier) club Millwall on a free transfer. He played 36 games in all competitions in his first season, helping the club reach the play-offs, in which they lost to Derby County in the semifinal. During that season he also spent a month on loan at Birmingham City as cover for the injured Scott Hiley.

The following season, his Millwall career consisted of one three-minute substitute appearance before he went out on another month's loan, this time to Bradford City of Division Two. The loan was extended for a further two months, then in January 1995 Huxford signed for Bradford City on a permanent basis for a fee of £50,000. He contributed to the club's promotion to Division One via the play-offs, and was involved in the build-up to both goals in the play-off final against Notts County. His chances at Bradford were limited at the higher level, and after a brief spell on loan to Peterborough United, the club released him from his contract in January 1997 and he joined Burnley, initially on a short-term deal until the end of the season. His contract was extended, and new manager Chris Waddle put him in the starting eleven, but he soon fell out of favour, and was allowed to try his luck in the Scottish League, joining Dunfermline Athletic on loan.

Huxford made his Scottish Premier League debut on 15 February 1998 away at Celtic: Dunfermline lost 5–1. The move was made permanent at the end of the season, and he played fairly regularly in his first permanent season with the club, but in September 1999 cruciate ligament damage put an end to his Dunfermline career. Released at the end of the 1999–2000 season, Huxford signed a one-year contract with part-timers Alloa Athletic, newly promoted to the Scottish First Division. His season with Alloa was disrupted by injury, and he was one of numerous players released as the club were relegated. Partick Thistle offered a three-month deal at the start of the 2000–01 season, but when the club decided to go full-time, he made the switch to Berwick Rangers in order to continue his studies. Albeit as a late substitute, he was part of the Berwick team which held Rangers to a goalless draw in the Scottish Cup.

During the 2002–03 season, Huxford played for Cambridge City's reserve team on trial, and turned out for Ely City of the Eastern Counties League, while attending courses at a Christian college in Hertfordshire. Huxford made a return to league football in 2006 with Elgin City of the Scottish Third Division, initially as fitness coach, later making one appearance as a player.

== After football ==
While playing as a semi-professional in Scotland, Huxford earned a master's degree in sports science from the University of Edinburgh. In 2005, he was appointed as a Sports Science Officer for the Scottish Institute of Sport. Huxford has also coached the youth teams of Manchester United and Crewe Alexandra, and the senior squad of American side Carolina RailHawks.

== Honours ==
Bradford City

- Football League Second Division play-offs: 1996
