= Bomarsund, Northumberland =

Village in Northumberland, England

Coordinates: 55.154°N 1.570°W

Bomarsund
- Location within Northumberland
- OS grid reference: NZ275845
- Shire county: Northumberland
- Region: North East
- Country: England
- Sovereign state: United Kingdom
- Post town: BEDLINGTON
- Postcode district: NE22
- Police: Northumbria
- Fire: Northumberland
- Ambulance: North East

Bomarsund is a village in Northumberland, in England. It is situated to the north of Bedlington, and just south of Stakeford.

The village grew around a coal pit opened in 1854 and was named after the August 1854 battle – part of the Crimean War – at the fortress of Bomarsund in Sund, Åland, now part of Finland. The village was home to the former Northumberland Brewery. Bomarsund won the National Village Cricket Championship in 1974. They beat a team from Collingham, Nottinghamshire by three wickets in the final, which was played at Edgbaston, after the original match at Lord's was rained off.
