= Jamie McClen =

English footballer (born 1979)

Personal information
- Full name: James David McClen
- Date of birth: 13 May 1979 (age 47)
- Place of birth: Cramlington, England
- Position: Midfielder

Youth career
- 1989–1997: Newcastle United

Senior career*
Years	Team	Apps	(Gls)
1997–2005	Newcastle United	14	(0)
2000–2001	→ Motherwell (loan)	3	(0)
2005	Carlisle United	2	(0)
2006	Blyth Spartans	1	(1)
2006	Shrewsbury Town	4	(0)
2006–2007	Kidderminster Harriers	5	(0)
2006–2007	→ Bedlington Terriers (loan)	7	(2)
2007	Hamilton Academical	3	(0)
2007–2008	Gateshead	31	(0)
2008	→ Newcastle Blue Star (loan)		
2008–2009	Newcastle Blue Star		
2009–2010	Morpeth Town		
Total		70	(3)
- * Club domestic league appearances and goals as of 22:27, 15 August 2010 (UTC)

James David McClen (born 13 May 1979) is an English retired footballer who played as a defender or midfielder.

== Early life and youth career ==
McClen attended St. Benet Biscop Catholic High School in Bedlington, Northumberland. He honed his footballing skills at the youth academy of Newcastle United at the age of 10 after being spotted whilst playing for Cramlington Juniors.

== Playing career ==
=== Newcastle United ===
McClen debuted for Newcastle in 1999 against Tottenham Hotspur under the management of Ruud Gullit. Gullit offered McClen a long-term deal which was promptly signed. He drifted out of the first-team picture for a few years, only to get a break in the team when injuries took their toll on Newcastle. McClen took his chance, including a goal against Peterborough United in the FA Cup, going on to make 10 more appearances in the 2001–02 season, including against Arsenal in the FA Cup. McClen's performances that season, in which Newcastle finished 4th, earned him another long-term deal which was promptly signed. However, McClen struggled to retain his place in the first team before eventually being released in 2005 to Carlisle United.

=== Later career ===
McClen's spell at Carlisle only lasted a few months before he was released. He then went to Blyth Spartans on a short-term basis. He returned to the Football League to join Shrewsbury Town, but he was released due to concerns over his fitness levels. In June 2006 he signed a 12-month contract with Kidderminster Harriers of the Football Conference. On 3 November 2006, McClen returned to the north-east to play for Bedlington Terriers on loan.

McClen was released by Kidderminster in January 2007 and signed for Hamilton Academical until the end of the season. However, he was released in March 2007.

In August 2007, McClen joined Northern Premier League outfit Gateshead ahead of the 2007–08 season. January 2008 saw McClen join Newcastle Blue Star on loan until the end of the season. The move became permanent at the start of the 2008–09 season.

After Newcastle Blue Star dissolved, McClean joined Morpeth Town, before a trial with Thai Premier League side Pattaya United F.C. in January 2010. McClen opted to stay in the north-east as he had a young family.
