= North Blyth Brewery =

British brewery

North Blyth Brewery (formerly Northumberland Brewery)
- Fuggles Bar, former home of Northumberland Brewery
- Location: Blyth, Northumberland, England
- Opened: 1996
- Closed: 17 May 2021
- Annual production volume: 1,200 imperial barrels (2,000 hL) (approx)
- Owned by: Independent

North Blyth Brewery was a small brewery which was located in Blyth, in Northumberland, England. It produced cask ale. It operated between 1996 and 2021.

== History ==
The brewery opened in Bomarsund, Northumberland in 1996 under the name Northumberland Brewery with a selection of five beers, Northumberland Castles (3.8% abv), Northumberland County (4.2%), Northumberland Best (4.2%) and Duke of Northumberland Premium (5.0%). It served nearly 60 cask ales.

The names of most of the beer produced at the brewery were named after local people and places, such as Mackem's Shovel Ale and Holy Island Ale, after Sunderland A.F.C. supporters and the island of Holy Island respectively. The brewery also named a few of its beers after political issues, such as Talivan (after speed camera vans - a play on the Taliban), Highway Robbery (also after speed cameras) and hung parliament, with a pump clip showing members of parliament with nooses around their necks. They also named beers after the local football team players for both Sunderland AFC and Newcastle United FC.

The brewery relocated in 2007 to larger premises at Barrington Road, Bedlington with a larger on site bar which was called Fuggles (after the Fuggle hops). In 2015 part of the plant and Production was moved to Blyth and the brewery name changed to North Blyth, although many of the beers were retained.

The brewery closed on 17 May 2021.
