= St Benet Biscop Catholic Academy =

Location
- Ridge Terrace; Bedlington, Northumberland, NE22 6ED; England; 55°07′57″N 1°36′18″W

Information
- Type: Academy
- Mottoes: Pax Christi and Learning to value, Learning to give, Learning to achieve, Growing in the Peace of Christ
- Religious affiliation: Roman Catholic
- Established: 1976
- Local authority: Northumberland
- Trust: Bishop Bewick Catholic Education Trust
- Department for Education URN: 141814 Tables
- Ofsted: Reports
- Chair of Governors: Christine Mills
- Headteacher: Suzanne Lewis-Dale
- Staff: 2
- Gender: mixed
- Age: 11 to 18
- Enrolment: 1068
- Capacity: 1140
- Houses: Bish and Copt
- Colour
- Website: https://www.st-benetbiscop.org.uk/

St. Benet Biscop Catholic Academy (formerly S. Benet Biscop Catholic High School) is a Roman Catholic high school in Bedlington, Northumberland, England. It is the only Catholic high school in the county.

== Patron ==
Biscop Baducing was born around 628. He served King Oswui of Northumbria as a warrior until 653 when he accompanied St. Wilfrid on a pilgrimage to Rome. He made a second visit with Alcfrith, Oswui's son, when he became a monk and renamed himself Benedict. On his third trip to Rome he returned in 669 with Theodore of Tarsus, the newly appointed archbishop of Canterbury. Theodore appointed him abbot of Sts. Peter and Paul monastery, which is now known as St. Augustine's Canterbury. He founded the monastery at Jarrow, in 682. His last trip to Rome in 685 resulted in the adoption of the Roman script and in many additions to the libraries at Wearmouth and Jarrow,

== History ==
Northumberland used to have a middle school system (three tier) and this was the site of the Catholic upper school. It was reorganised in 2000 and became St Benet Biscop Catholic Voluntary Aided High School. Inspections judged this to be a good school in 2007, 2010 and 2013. It converted to an academy in March 2015 and has since been judged twice in 2016 and 2019 as requiring improvement The 2021 limited remote monitoring inspection reported that the outstanding issues had been addressed. In January 2023, the school had an inspection that judged the school 'A good school' in all areas.

== Description ==
This is a larger than average Catholic comprehensive school serving a large area of Northumbria. The intake is largely White British with a lower than average number of ethnic minority students, or students from deprived backgrounds or students with special needs.

The principal feeder schools are:

- St Aidan's R.C. Primary School, Ashington
- St Bede's RCVA Primary School, Bedlington
- St Paul's RCVA Primary School, Alnwick
- Ss Peter and Paul's Catholic Primary Academy, Cramlington
- St Wilfrid's RCVA Primary School, Blyth

The school consists of six teaching blocks named after saints. In 2020 it was in the midst of a four million pound enlargement and refurbishment which involved securing the perimeter fence, gutting the St Oswald's administrative building and extending the St Wilfrid's block. Another new block, St Hilda's has been built of a pre-fab construction for September 2020. An Extension of the Hall was also built. This was completed in October 2020. Further development has been completed that consists of a new Sixth Form block, which will take the name of the current secondary English block, St Cuthbert, whilst the older secondary English block is scheduled to be levelled due to its outdated structure. A new sports hall was built, which will enable extra sports and co-curricular programmes. Separate, but on the school site is the Lodge.

== Academics ==
Virtually all maintained schools and academies follow the National Curriculum, and are inspected by Ofsted on how well they succeed in delivering a 'broad and balanced curriculum'.

== Notable alumni ==
- Jamie McClen, footballer; ex-Newcastle United player
