= Kenneth Pearson =

English cricketer

Personal information
- Full name: Kenneth Pearson
- Born: 30 August 1951 (age 75); Bedlington, Northumberland, England
- Batting: Right-handed
- Role: Occasional wicket-keeper

Domestic team information
- Years: Team
- 1979: Minor Counties North
- 1976–1977: Minor Counties East
- 1976: Minor Counties
- 1972–1989: Northumberland

Career statistics
| Competition | First-class | List A |
|---|---|---|
| Matches | 1 | 16 |
| Runs scored | 13 | 329 |
| Batting average | 6.50 | 20.56 |
| 100s/50s | –/– | –/2 |
| Top score | 9 | 74 |
| Balls bowled | – | 438 |
| Wickets | – | 1 |
| Bowling average | – | – |
| 5 wickets in innings | – | – |
| 10 wickets in match | – | – |
| Best bowling | – | – |
| Catches/stumpings | 1/– | 3/– |
- Source: Cricinfo, 1 August 2011

Kenneth Pearson (born 30 August 1951) is a former English cricketer. Pearson was a right-handed batsman who fielded occasionally as a wicket-keeper. He was born in Bedlington, Northumberland. He played club cricket for Jesmond for 37 seasons from the age of 17.

Pearson made his debut for Northumberland against Cumberland in the 1972 Minor Counties Championship. He played Minor counties cricket for Northumberland from 1972 to 1989, making 156 Minor Counties Championship appearances and 11 MCCA Knockout Trophy appearances. He made his List A appearance for Northumberland against Bedfordshire in the 1977 Gillette Cup. He made 5 further List A appearances for Northumberland, the last of which came against Surrey in the 1989 NatWest Trophy. In these, he scored 153 runs at an average of 25.50, with a high score of 61. His score, his only half century for the county in List A cricket, came against Essex in the 1986 NatWest Trophy. In the Minor Counties Championship he scored 9100 runs, a record for the county, with his best season in 1980 bring ing 956 runs.

Playing for Northumberland allowed him to play for a combined Minor counties team in one form or another. In 1976, he made his only first-class appearance for the Minor Counties cricket team against the touring West Indians. In this match he opened the batting for the Minor Counties, being dismissed by Bernard Julien for 4 runs in their first-innings, while in their second-innings he was dismissed for 9 runs by Vanburn Holder. It was for Minor Counties East that he made his debut in List A cricket for, against Nottinghamshire in the 1976 Benson & Hedges Cup. He made 7 further List A appearances for the team, the last of which came against Yorkshire in the 1977 Benson & Hedges Cup. In these 8 matches, he scored 170 runs at an average of 21.25, with a high score of 74. This score, his only half century for the team, came against Middlesex in 1976. He later made 2 List A appearances for Minor Counties North in the 1979 Benson & Hedges Cup, against Yorkshire and Nottinghamshire. These matches were without success, with Pearson scoring 2 runs.

He has a degree in Metallurgy from the University of Newcastle and worked as a research scientist, later becoming a newsagent.
