= Mark Stallard =

English footballer and manager

Personal information
- Date of birth: 24 October 1974 (age 52)
- Place of birth: Derby, England
- Height: 6 ft 0 in (1.83 m)
- Position: Striker

Youth career
- Derby County

Senior career*
| Years | Team | Apps | (Gls) |
| 1991–1996 | Derby County | 27 | (2) |
| 1994 | → Fulham (loan) | 4 | (3) |
| 1996 | → Bradford City (loan) | 1 | (0) |
| 1996–1997 | Bradford City | 42 | (10) |
| 1997 | → Preston North End (loan) | 4 | (1) |
| 1997–1999 | Wycombe Wanderers | 73 | (23) |
| 1999–2004 | Notts County | 185 | (66) |
| 2004–2005 | Barnsley | 15 | (1) |
| 2004–2005 | → Chesterfield (loan) | 9 | (2) |
| 2005 | → Notts County (loan) | 16 | (3) |
| 2005–2006 | Shrewsbury Town | 37 | (6) |
| 2006–2008 | Lincoln City | 66 | (17) |
| 2008–2009 | Mansfield Town | 27 | (8) |
| 2009 | Corby Town | 0 | (0) |
| Total | | 506 | (142) |

Managerial career
- 2008: Mansfield Town (caretaker)
- * Club domestic league appearances and goals

Mark Stallard (born 24 October 1974) is an English former professional footballer. He made more than 450 appearances in the Football League between 1991 and 2008, scoring 142 goals.

== Career ==
=== Derby County ===
Born in Derby, Stallard began his career as a trainee in the city with Derby County in 1991. He made more than 30 league and cup appearances for Derby and spent short periods on loan at Fulham and Bradford City.

=== Bradford City ===
Stallard signed with Bradford on a permanent basis in January 1996 for a transfer fee of £110,000. He scored the second goal during Bradford's 1996 Second Division play-off final victory. A short loan spell at Preston North End in the 1996–97 season was immediately followed by a move away from The Bantams.

=== Wycombe Wanderers ===
Stallard fetched £100,000 in his transfer to Wycombe Wanderers in March 1997, where he scored 23 goals in 73 league games.

=== Notts County ===
Stallard joined Notts County in March 1999 for a fee of £10,000, where he stayed for almost five years. He scored 66 times in 185 league appearances and was named the club's player of the year and players' player of the year in 2003 after scoring 25 goals as Notts County battled against relegation during the 2002–03 season.

=== Barnsley ===
Stallard joined Barnsley in January 2004 but made only 15 appearances, before being allowed to join Chesterfield on loan in September 2004. After three months at Chesterfield, he then re-joined Notts County in February 2005 on loan for the remainder of the 2004–05 season. He was released by Barnsley at the end of the season.

=== Shrewsbury Town ===
Stallard joined Shrewsbury Town on a two-year contract in July 2005. He spent only one season at Shrewsbury Town, where he scored six times in 37 league appearances, before leaving the club.

=== Lincoln City ===
He joined Lincoln City in July 2006. He had a successful start to the 2006–07 season, scoring seven goals and collecting the League Two Player of the Month award for September 2006. He went on to score 17 goals in 66 league appearances for Lincoln in two seasons, despite his 2007–08 season being interrupted by injury and a three match suspension following a sending off against Rotherham in February 2008.

=== Mansfield Town ===
Stallard was one of four players released by Lincoln City at the end of the 2007–08 season, and joined Conference National club Mansfield Town in July 2008, rejecting an offer from Northern Premier League Premier Division outfit Eastwood Town. In December 2008, Stallard was appointed Mansfield's caretaker manager, along with fellow player Adie Moses, after the sacking of Billy McEwan. The pair won two league games before Mansfield appointed David Holdsworth as the new permanent manager.

=== Corby Town ===
On 8 July 2009, Stallard joined Conference North outfit Corby Town on a free transfer. In October 2009, Stallard retired from professional football, stating his belief that it was unfair to take a wage from the club when he was no longer performing at their level.

== Honours ==
Bradford City

- Football League Second Division play-offs: 1996
