= Des Hamilton =

English manager and former footballer

Personal information
- Full name: Derrick Vivian Hamilton
- Date of birth: 15 August 1976 (age 50)
- Place of birth: Bradford, England
- Position: Midfielder

Youth career
- Bradford City

Senior career*
Years	Team	Apps	(Gls)
1994–1997	Bradford City	88	(5)
1997–2001	Newcastle United	12	(1)
1998	→ Sheffield United (loan)	6	(0)
1999	→ Huddersfield Town (loan)	10	(1)
2000	→ Norwich City (loan)	7	(0)
2000	→ Tranmere Rovers (loan)	2	(0)
2001	→ Tranmere Rovers (loan)	4	(0)
2001–2003	Cardiff City	25	(0)
2003–2004	Grimsby Town	27	(0)
2004	Barnet	0	(0)
2005–2010	Campion		
Total		181	(6)

International career
1997	England U21	1	(0)
- * Club domestic league appearances and goals

Derrick Vivian Hamilton (born 15 August 1976) is an English former professional footballer and was assistant manager of Eccleshill United.

As a player he played as a midfielder from 1994 to 2010. He started his career with his hometown club Bradford City, making his debut at the age of 17. He helped Bradford win promotion to the First Division by scoring in the 1996 Football League Second Division play-off final. He left Bradford less than a year later for a club record £2m having played more than 100 career games. He instead signed for Newcastle United, for whom he played in both the UEFA Champions League and UEFA Cup. However, he was restricted to just 12 league games in five seasons and spent time on loan with four other clubs. He moved on to Cardiff City and Grimsby Town, but after a brief spell at Barnet for whom he never played, he retired from professional football age of 27. He later went on to spend five years with Non-League side Campion. He won one England under-21 cap.

== Playing career ==
=== Bradford City ===
Born in Bradford, Hamilton came through the youth ranks at Bradford City as a promising youngster. He made his debut, aged 17, in the league at home to Barnet on 3 May 1994 scoring in a 2–1 win. He was a main feature in the team for the following two seasons and helped City to promotion from Division Two in 1995–96. He scored in the play-off semi-finals at Blackpool as City turned round a 2–0 first leg deficit into a 3–2 aggregate win before scoring the club's first goal at Wembley Stadium in the 2–0 play-off final victory over Notts County.

City struggled to adapt to life in Division One the following season but Hamilton was attracting the scouts to Valley Parade. He eventually signed for Newcastle United before the March transfer window for £2m. It is still a club record fee received by Bradford, jointly shared by Andy O'Brien who also left for Newcastle four years later.

During his time with Bradford, Hamilton won a call-up to the Football League XI to play against a Serie B select side.

=== Newcastle United ===
Hamilton was manager Kenny Dalglish's first major signing at Newcastle, having fought off competition from Middlesbrough. Hamilton was injured at the time of his arrival and his full debut was further delayed after he damaged ankle ligaments in a pre-season friendly with Italian-side Juventus. Hamilton eventually made his debut in a League Cup 2–0 victory over Hull City when he scored the opening goal and received a call-up for the England under 21 side against Portugal in May 1997. In November 1997, he made his European debut, against Spanish side FC Barcelona, which finished in a 1–0 defeat. However, Hamilton struggled to break into the first team at Newcastle United and, along with Rob Lee and Alessandro Pistone, was not even given a squad number for the 1999–2000 season.

Instead Hamilton spent loan spells at Sheffield United, Huddersfield Town, Norwich City and twice at Tranmere Rovers in October 2000. His first spell at Tranmere was cut short after he injured himself in a League Cup tie, which ruled him out for six weeks. Hamilton was one of four players released by Newcastle at the end of the 2000–01 season.

=== Cardiff City ===
He left St James' Park in 2001 for Cardiff City. His new manager Alan Cork praised Hamilton, and fellow new signings Spencer Prior and Graham Kavanagh for their experience and immediately blending into the squad. Hamilton made an early impression in two pre-season friendlies, but his first season at Cardiff was marred by a number of injuries; by March, he was ruled out for the final two months of the campaign after he twisted his knee in a semi-final victory against Wrexham in the FAW Premier Cup.

=== Grimsby Town and move to Barnet ===
In the summer of 2003, Hamilton joined Grimsby Town and immediately joined his new team on tour in Ibiza. Hamilton's career with Grimsby suffered an early setback when he was sent off in a League Cup against Doncaster Rovers; Hamilton apologised after his red card led to Grimsby's surprise exit. He left Grimsby in March 2004 after his contract was terminated by mutual consent. He finished his professional career with Barnet. However, he did not play a game with the Bees.

=== Campion ===
Hamilton abruptly retired from professional football in 2004 at the age of 27. He returned home to Bradford to work where he also played amateur football. In May 2007, he scored in the final of the West Riding County FA Challenge Cup to give his Campion side a 2–1 victory over Golcar.

== Coaching career ==
In 2017 he became the assistant manager of Eccleshill United.

== Playing statistics ==
Club	Season	Division	League		FA Cup		League Cup		Europe		Other		Total	
Club	Season	Division	Apps	Goals	Apps	Goals	Apps	Goals	Apps	Goals	Apps	Goals	Apps	Goals
Bradford City	1993–94	Second Division	2	1					–					
Bradford City	1994–95	Second Division	30	1					–					
Bradford City	1995–96	Second Division	24	3					–					
Bradford City	1996–97	First Division	32	0	3	0	1	0	–		0	0	36	0
Bradford City	Total		88	5	6	0	6	0	–		5	2	105	7
Newcastle United	1996–97	Premier League	0	0	0	0	0	0	–		–		0	0
Newcastle United	1997–98	Premier League	12	0	1	0	2	1	2^{[A]}	0	–		17	1
Newcastle United	1998–99	Premier League	0	0	0	0	0	0	0	0	–		0	0
Newcastle United	1999–2000	Premier League	0	0	0	0	0	0	1^{[B]}	0	–		1	0
Newcastle United	2000–01	Premier League	0	0	0	0	0	0	–		–		0	0
Newcastle United	Total		12	0	1	0	2	1	3	0	–		18	1
Sheffield United (loan)	1998–99	First Division	6	0	0	0	0	0	–		–		6	0
Huddersfield Town (loan)	1998–99	First Division	10	1	0	0	0	0	–		–		10	1
Norwich City (loan)	1999–2000	First Division	7	0	0	0	0	0	–		–		7	0
Tranmere Rovers (loan)	2000–01	First Division	2	0	0	0	1	0	–		–		3	0
Tranmere Rovers (loan)	2000–01	First Division	4	0	3	0	0	0	–		–		7	0
Cardiff City	2001–02	Second Division	19	0	2	1	0	0	–		2	0	23	1
Cardiff City	2002–03	Second Division	6	0	3	0	1	0	–		2	0	12	0
Cardiff City	Total		25	0	5	1	1	0	–		4^{[C]}	0	35	1
Grimsby Town	2003–04	Second Division	27	0	2	0	1	0	–		1^{[D]}	0	31	0
Barnet	2003–04	Football Conference							–					
Career total			181	6	17	1	11	1	3	0	10	2	222	10

A. In the 1997–98 season, Hamilton played two games in the UEFA Champions League for Newcastle United.
B. In the 1999–2000 season, Hamilton played one games in the UEFA Cup for Newcastle United.
C. Hamilton played four games in the Football League Trophy for Cardiff City.
D. Hamilton played one game in the Football League Trophy for Grimsby Town.

== Honours ==
Bradford City

- Football League Second Division play-offs: 1996
