= Paul Talbot =

English footballer

Personal information
- Full name: Paul Michael Talbot
- Date of birth: 11 August 1979 (age 47)
- Place of birth: Gateshead, Tyne and Wear, England
- Height: 5 ft 9 in (1.75 m)
- Positions: Defender; midfielder

Youth career
- –1997: Newcastle United

Senior career*
Years	Team	Apps	(Gls)
1997–2000	Newcastle United	0	(0)
2000	York City	6	(0)
2000–	Gateshead		
2002–2003	Burton Albion	30	(1)
2003–	Queen of the South	4	(0)
- Spennymoor United
Total		40	(1)
- * Club domestic league appearances and goals

Paul Michael Talbot (born 11 August 1979) is an English former professional footballer who played as a defender or as a midfielder in the Football League for York City, in non-League football for Gateshead, Burton Albion and Spennymoor United, in the Scottish Football League for Queen of the South, and was on the books of Newcastle United without making a league appearance.
