= Stakeford =

Village in Northumberland, England

Coordinates: 55.163°N 1.586°W

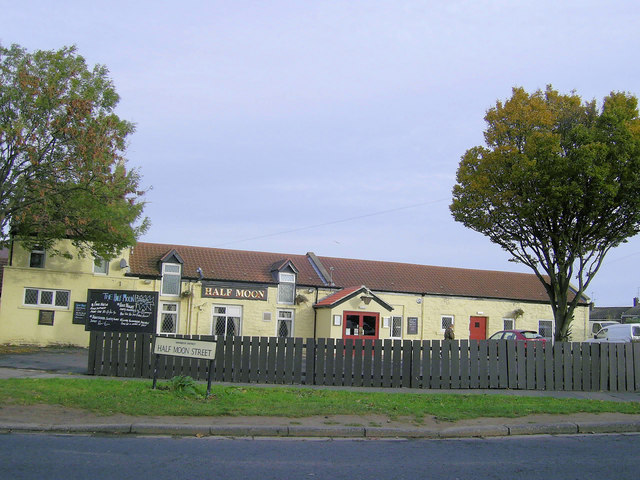
- Half Moon public house

- Location within Northumberland
- Population: 4,672 (Ward.2011)
- OS grid reference: NZ265855
- Civil parish: Choppington
- Unitary authority: Northumberland
- Ceremonial county: Northumberland
- Region: North East
- Country: England
- Sovereign state: United Kingdom
- Post town: CHOPPINGTON
- Postcode district: NE62
- Dialling code: 01670
- Police: Northumbria
- Fire: Northumberland
- Ambulance: North East
- UK Parliament: Wansbeck

Stakeford is a large village in south east Northumberland, England.

Its about 17 miles (27 km) north of Newcastle upon Tyne. It lies south of the River Wansbeck from Ashington, the nearest town. The village takes its name from the former river crossing to the north of the village, this was a crossing through the mudflats which was marked with stakes to give an idea of the water depth, hence the name Stakeford. The river crossing has long gone, but remains of the stakes can be seen in the river bed becoming visible whenever the dam downstream is opened. The old river crossing was replaced by a bridge in the early 20th century, which in itself was replaced by the new Stakeford Bridge in 1994. There is now no trace of the original ford due to the mudflats being used as a landfill site in the 1950s and 60s and the creation of a riverside country park in the 1970s.

It is a mainly residential village. There are three pubs and a Social Club. There is also a miners' institute although it never had a mine as this was located in the adjacent village of Bomarsund. Stakeford has several shops and a primary school. Today Stakeford forms one built-up area, with neighbouring Guide Post and Sheepwash.

== Notable people ==
- John Trewick, professional footballer for Newcastle United in the early 1980s
- Mick Harrison and Tim Pattison, bassist and drummer for Leicester-based '90s indie/punk rock/krautrock/shoegaze band, Prolapse (band), grew up in Stakeford
- Darren Allison, record producer and musician.

== Governance ==
The village is in Choppington parish. It also has an electoral ward in its own name. The total ward population taken at the 2011 Census was 4,672.
