= Bedlington =

Town in Northumberland, England

Coordinates: 55°07′55″N 1°35′58″W

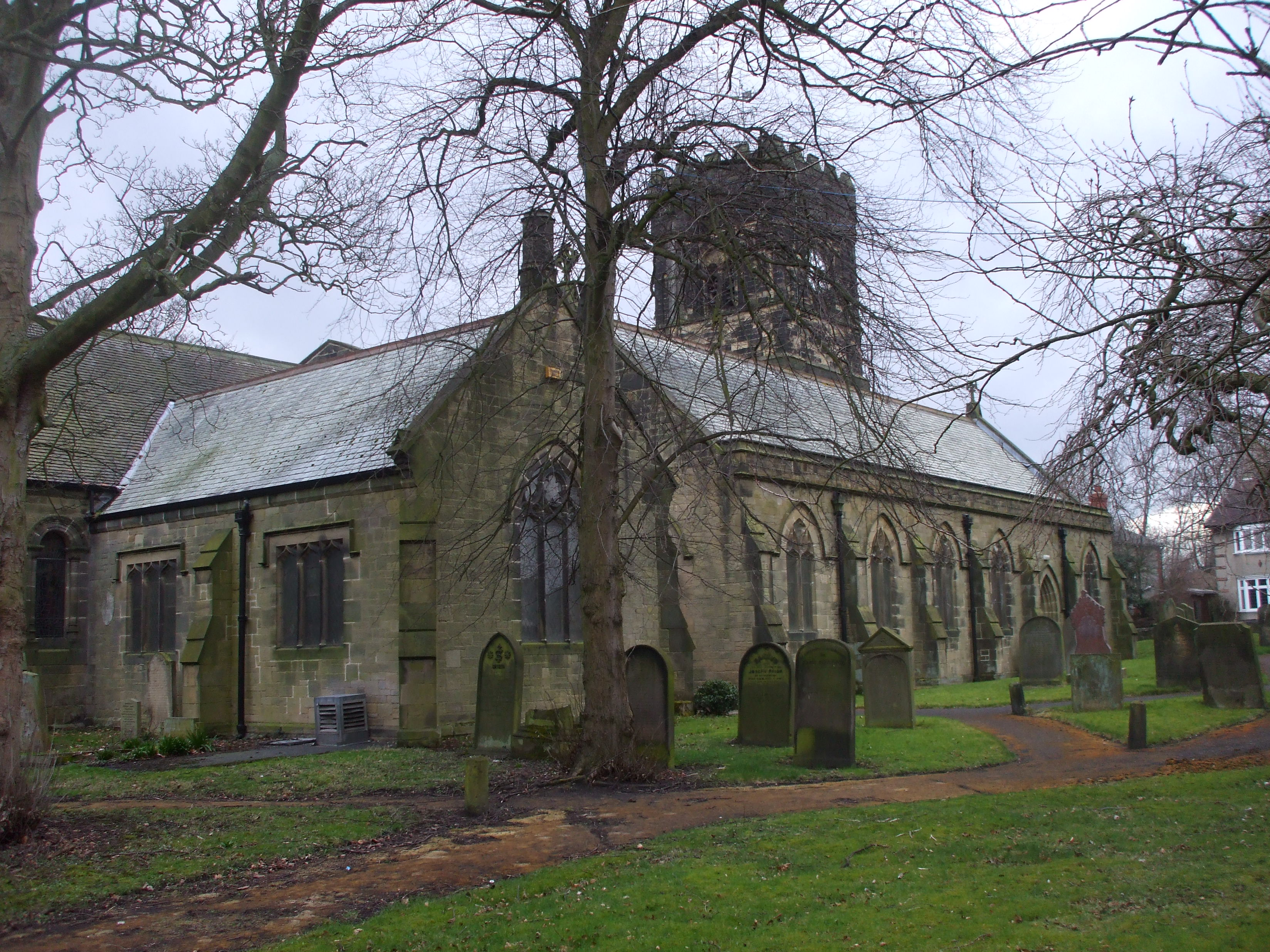
- St. Cuthbert's Church, Bedlington

- Location within Northumberland
- Population: 18,470
- OS grid reference: NZ258819
- Civil parish: West Bedlington
- Unitary authority: Northumberland
- Ceremonial county: Northumberland
- Region: North East
- Country: England
- Sovereign state: United Kingdom
- Post town: BEDLINGTON
- Postcode district: NE22
- Dialling code: 01670
- Police: Northumbria
- Fire: Northumberland
- Ambulance: North East
- UK Parliament: Blyth and Ashington

Bedlington is a town in the civil parish of West Bedlington, in Northumberland, England, with a population of 18,470 measured at the 2011 Census.

Bedlington is an ancient market town, with a rich history of industry and innovative residents. Located roughly 10 miles (16 kilometres) northeast of Newcastle and Newcastle Airport, Bedlington is roughly 10 minutes from the A1 road, in southeast Northumberland. Other nearby places include Morpeth to the northwest, Ashington to the northeast, Blyth to the east and Cramlington to the south. In 1961 the parish had a population of 29,403.

The town has evidence of habitation from the Bronze Age, with a burial site being located just behind what is now the main Front Street. A cluster of Bronze Age cist burials were discovered during excavation of the site in the 1930s. St Cuthbert's Church is the longest standing building in the town, with parts of this dating back to the 11th century and recently celebrated being 1000 years old. The church is in the heart of the original sandstone conservation town centre. Most of the medieval town has disappeared with many of the historic buildings and factories being demolished over the years, but there are still nods to medieval street layouts. The main Front Street is currently made up of Georgian and Victorian buildings.

At key points in history, before and during the Industrial Revolution, goods made in Bedlington made it to all corners of the globe through the distribution of nails and trains that were made in Bedlington from some 250 years ago. With large industry first being attracted to Bedlington over 250 years ago, in the form of its iron works, mining became an intrinsic part of Bedlington from 1838. The coal industry remained at the heart of the town until the closure of the mines in the 1980s. Today Bedlington's Front Street is host to a number of well-established eating and drinking venues, and there is an emergence of new establishments and retailers entering the town.

The parish of Bedlington constituted the historic exclave of County Durham called Bedlingtonshire.

== History ==
The place-name "Bedlington" is first attested circa 1050 in a biography of Saint Cuthbert, where it appears as "Bedlingtun". The name means "the town of Bedla's people".

Bedlington and the hamlets belonging to it were bought by Cutheard, Bishop of Durham, between 900 and 915, and although locally in the county of Northumberland, it became part of the county palatine (from Lat. palatium, a palace) of Durham, over which Bishop Walcher was granted royal rights by William the Conqueror.

When these rights were taken from Cuthbert Tunstall, Bishop of Durham, in 1536, Bedlington among his other properties, lost its special privileges, but was confirmed to him in 1541 with the other property of his predecessors. Together with the other lands of the see of Durham, Bedlington was made over to the ecclesiastical commissioners in 1866. Bedlingtonshire was made part of Northumberland for civil purposes by acts of parliament in 1832 and 1844.

Bedlington became an industrial town with an iron works and several coal mines, however subsequent closure of these industries in the latter half of the 20th century caused the town to undergo many changes, becoming more of a dormitory town for those working in the surrounding areas. The last of the residential housing estates, formerly built for the mining families of the town, were taken over and razed by the council with residents evicted from the 'Pit Rows' estate in the early to mid 1970s, as was part and parcel of the government's national policy of this time.

The most important historic building in Bedlington was Bedlington Old Hall, which consisted of a 15th-century pele tower with a long early 18th-century stone block adjoining, occupying a prime location on the high street. It was controversially demolished in 1959 and replaced with council offices, which are now themselves empty and for sale.

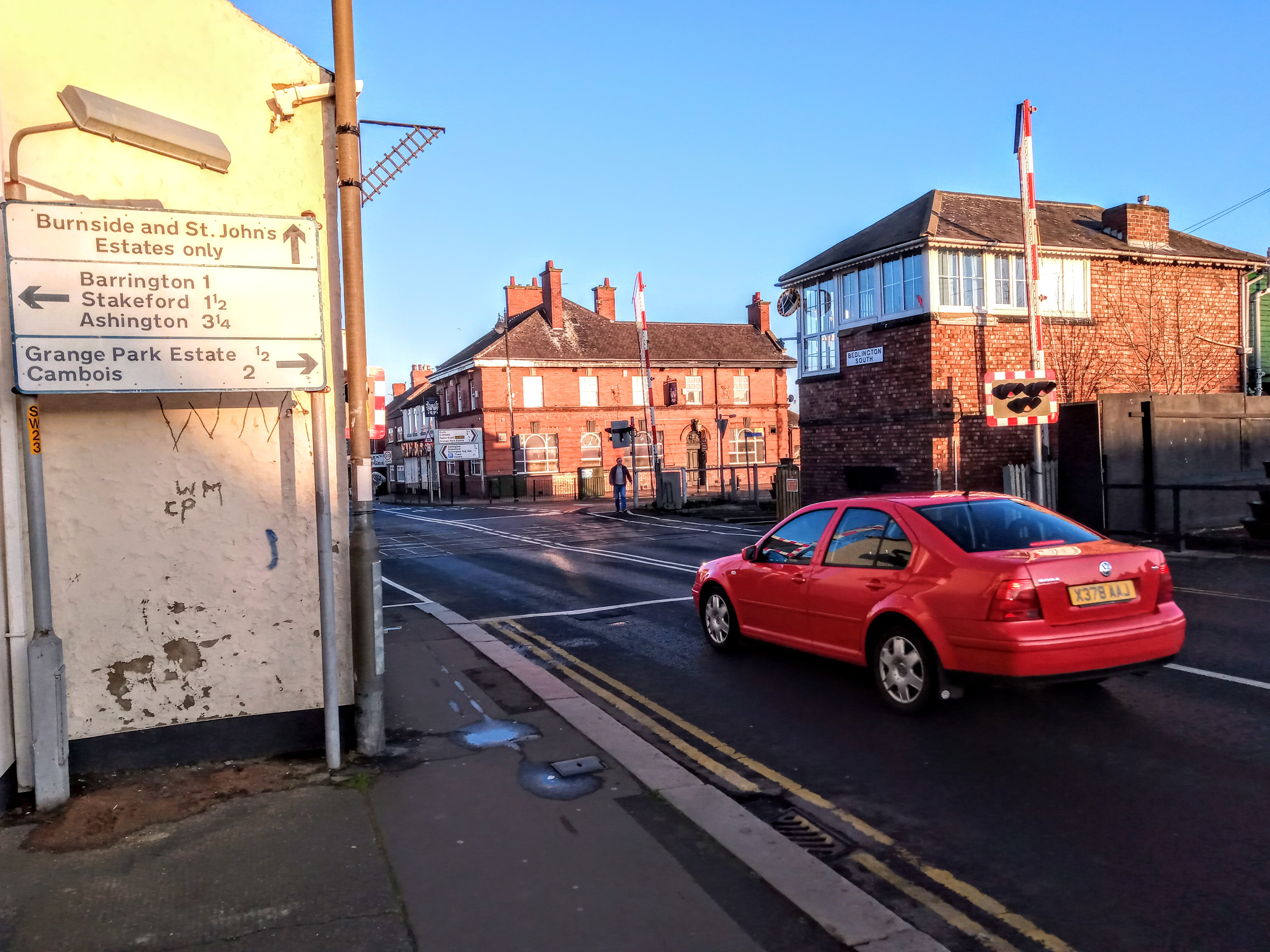
Bedlington South Box, Bedlington, Northumberland (Bedlingtonshire)

Another historic building is Hartford Hall which was owned by the Burdon family.

The parish was abolished on 1 April 1974 and became an unparished area in Wansbeck district.

== Development ==
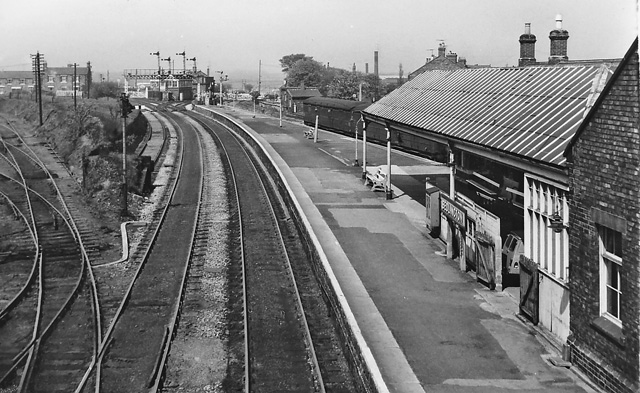
Bedlington once housed a public railway station, seen here in 1965. The line is still in use, but the station is no longer in service.

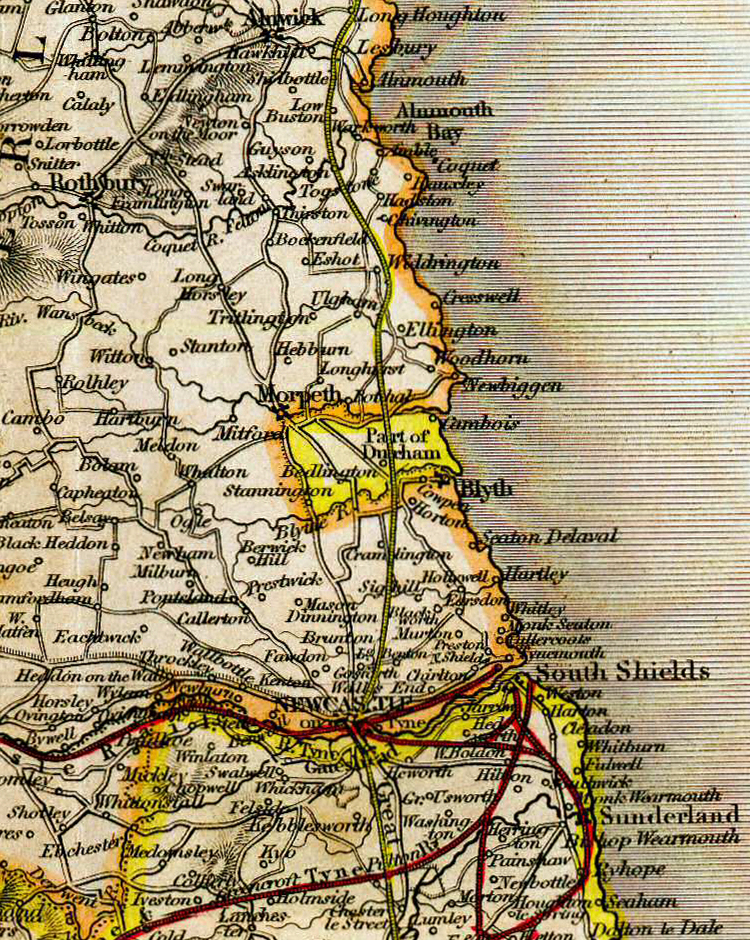
The yellow region in the centre is "Bedlingtonshire", a former exclave of the County Palatine of Durham, as shown in Betts's Family Atlas, 1846.

The town has three supermarkets, a post office, and several other smaller shops.

A weekly market is held on Thursdays at the market place. The number of market stalls is now also starting to decline.

== Transport ==
=== Air and sea ===
The nearest airport is Newcastle Airport, which provides scheduled domestic flights, flights covering many major cities in Europe, long haul international flights and holiday charter flights. There is a port in nearby North Shields with daily passenger services to IJmuiden in the Netherlands.

=== Bus ===
The town's main bus operator is Arriva North East. Arriva links Bedlington to Ashington, Morpeth, Cramlington, Blyth, Stakeford and Newcastle. The X21/X22 bus services link Ashington, Guide Post, Bedlington Station, Regent Centre, Gosforth and Newcastle Haymarket. The X21/X22 provides a combined 10 minute service on Monday - Friday daytimes. The 2 bus service link Morpeth, Guide Post, Bedlington Station and Blyth.

=== Rail ===
Bedlington railway station is part of the Northumberland Line, which runs a passenger rail service between Ashington and Newcastle. This service began on 29 March 2026, with a 30 minute service each way Monday - Saturday, and a 60 minute service each way on Sundays.

=== Road ===
The A189 Spine Road sits about 1 1/2 miles (2.5 kilometres) east of the town centre and links Ashington, Blyth, Cramlington, Killingworth, Gosforth and Newcastle. The A1 is about three miles (five kilometres) from the town centre and provides connectivity to Scotland and London. The town also has other roads like the A193, A1068, A1147 and the B1331.

== Education ==
Bedlington is served by two secondary schools: Bedlington Academy (previously Bedlingtonshire Community High School) and St Benet Biscop Catholic Academy. They are both in Bedlington, but they do take in children from Stakeford, Guide Post, Choppington, Stannington and even areas of Morpeth. Bedlington is also served by three primary schools: Bedlington Station Primary School, Stead Lane Primary School and St Bede's Primary School. One of the few middle schools left in England is Meadowdale Academy. This is soon to change however as Meadowdale is to change to a primary school. The town of Bedlington also has two first schools: Whitley Memorial C of E School and Bedlington West End County First School. Whitley Memorial C of E School became a primary school at the start of the summer 2021 term. Pupils may also commute around 13 miles (21 km) south to Newcastle upon Tyne if they choose to attend an independent school.

== Local parish ==
One of the most important surviving historic buildings is the Anglican parish church, which is dedicated to St. Cuthbert. It is reputed that the church takes its dedication from an event that occurred 12 December 1069: fleeing northwards from the Conqueror's army, the monks of Durham are said to have rested the body of St Cuthbert in Bedlington Church. The building, originally of Saxon design, was rebuilt about a hundred years later. Little of either the Saxon or the Norman church has survived.

There is a Roman Catholic congregation who worship in a relatively new church called St Bede's. In addition, there is a Salvation Army chapel.

Hartford Hall lies within the parish. Much of the riverside land between Bedlington and the hall forms the Bedlington Country Park, a designated local nature reserve.

== Local media ==
Local newspapers include the Evening Chronicle and the Journal, which also cover Tyneside and the rest of southeast Northumberland. The Newspost Leader is weekly and covers most of the former district of Wansbeck. The community-run Bedlington Website Bedlington.co.uk was started in 1998. It has been active in many of the recent initiatives to promote the town.

Local radio stations are BBC Radio Newcastle, Capital North East, Heart North East, Smooth North East, Hits Radio North East, and Koast Radio, a community based station. Local television news programmes are provided by ITV News Tyne Tees and BBC Look North.

== Notable residents ==
- John Birkinshaw — invented wrought iron rails in 1820
- Daniel Gooch (1816–1889) — railway and cable engineer
- John Viret Gooch (1812–1900) — railway mechanical engineer
- Thomas Longridge Gooch (1808–1882) — civil engineer
- Jayne Middlemiss (born 1971) — TV presenter, radio presenter and former model
- Denis Murphy (born 1948) — Labour Party MP for Wansbeck from 1997 to 2010
- Kenneth Pearson (born 1951) — cricketer
- Kathy Secker (1945–2015) — television presenter and former model
- Chris Dobey (born 1990) — darts player
- Callan Rydz (born 1998) — darts player

== Twin towns ==
Bedlington is twinned with Schalksmühle in North Rhine-Westphalia, Germany.

== Neighbouring towns ==
- Blyth
- Cramlington
- Bebside
- Stakeford
- Morpeth
- Ashington
- Guide Post
- Cambois

== See also ==
- Bedlington Terriers F.C.
