= Lucas Cominelli =

Argentinian footballer

Personal information
- Full name: Lucas Ariel Cominelli
- Date of birth: 15 December 1976 (age 49)
- Place of birth: Buenos Aires, Argentina
- Height: 1.83 m (6 ft 0 in)
- Position: Midfielder

Senior career*
Years	Team	Apps	(Gls)
- Sarmiento de Junín
1999–2000	Granada	0	(0)
2001	Avellino	2	(0)
2003	Las Palmas		
2003	Vastese	8	(0)
2004	Pahang FA		
2005	Oxford United	16	(1)
2005–2006	Ceuta	10	(0)
- Ayia Napa FC
2007	Ethnikos Achna FC		
2007–2008	Vecindario		
- * Club domestic league appearances and goals

Lucas Cominelli (born 15 December 1976) is an Argentine former professional footballer who played as a midfielder. He works as a football agent.

== Career ==
Cominelli trialled with Newcastle United and played with the club's reserves but did not earn a contract. He trialled with Carlisle United. He joined Las Palmas following a trial. In March 2003, while on an amateur contract with Atlético Madrid, he trialled with Norwegian club SK Brann but failed to impress.

Cominelli joined Malaysia Super League club Pahang FA ahead of the 2004 season. In August 2004 he trialled with Regionalliga side Fortuna Düsseldorf.

Following a trial in January 2005, Cominelli joined Football League Two side Oxford United. He expressed interest in remaining at the club but was not kept.

Cominelli played for Segunda División B club Ceuta in the 2005–06 season. In January 2006 the club tried to agree the termination of his contract.

In summer 2007 he moved to Segunda División B side Vecindario. He left after half of the season.
