= Guide Post =

Village in Northumberland, England

Coordinates: 55.159°N 1.604°W

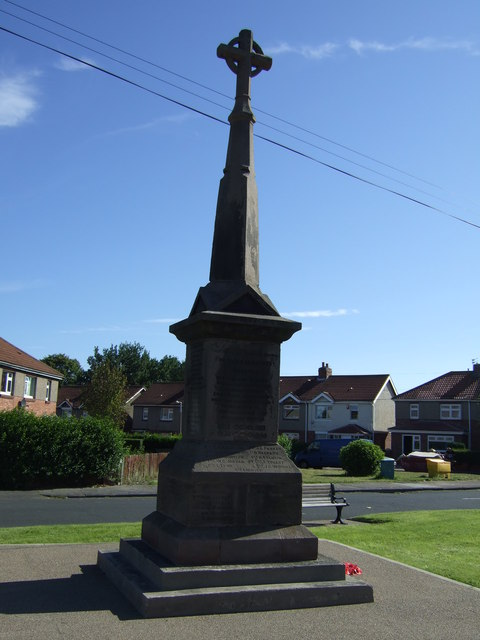
- War memorial

- Location within Northumberland
- OS grid reference: NZ253849
- Unitary authority: Northumberland
- Ceremonial county: Northumberland
- Region: North East
- Country: England
- Sovereign state: United Kingdom
- Post town: CHOPPINGTON
- Postcode district: NE62
- Dialling code: 01670
- Police: Northumbria
- Fire: Northumberland
- Ambulance: North East
- UK Parliament: Blyth and Ashington

Guide Post (also referred to as Guidepost) is a village in South East Northumberland, England, about 17 miles (27 km) north of Newcastle upon Tyne. It lies south of the River Wansbeck along with Stakeford (with whom it shares an undefined boundary). It is part of the civil parish of Choppington.

Guide Post is mainly a residential village. There are two pubs, The Anglers Arms and The Shakespeare Tavern, and a Social Club. It has several shops and three schools; Cleaswell Hill, Mowbray Primary and Ringway Primary.
