= 1997–98 Newcastle United F.C. season =

Newcastle United F.C.
1997–98 season
- Chairman: Freddy Shepherd (until 24 March 1998); Sir John Hall (from 24 March 1998)
- Manager: Kenny Dalglish
- Stadium: St James' Park
- Premier League: 13th
- FA Cup: Runners-up
- League Cup: Quarter-finals
- Champions League: Group stage
- Top goalscorer: League: Barnes (6); All: Barnes/Shearer (7)
- Highest home attendance: 36,783 (vs. Aston Villa, 23 August)
- Average home league attendance: 36,672
Home colours	Away colours

In the 1997–98 football season, Newcastle United played in the FA Premier League. They finished 13th and reached the FA Cup final, losing to Arsenal.

== Season summary ==
During the summer, David Ginola and Les Ferdinand were sold to Tottenham Hotspur, while in a pre-season friendly match, Alan Shearer sustained a horrific ankle injury which would keep him out for half the season. Manager Kenny Dalglish signed goalkeeper Shay Given, midfielder Temur Ketsbaia, striker John Barnes and veteran striker Ian Rush, the club's eldest player signing at age 36.

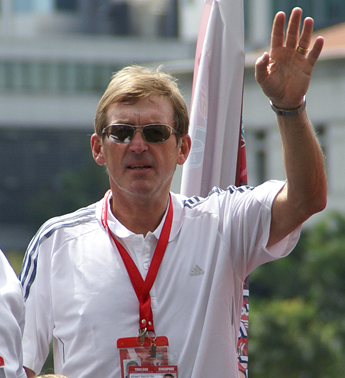
Kenny Dalglish

The highlight of the 1997–98 season was to be the club's run in the UEFA Champions League, seeing them defeat Barcelona 3–2 after a hat-trick from striker Faustino Asprilla. The club's Premier League form, however, began to suffer following Asprilla's departure from the club in January, and despite the return of Shearer to the starting line-up, he was unable to recapture the form he had found under Kevin Keegan. The club reached the FA Cup final only to fall to a 2–0 defeat by Arsenal.

Controversy surrounded the club in March 1998 when chairman Freddie Shepherd, and deputy chairman Douglas Hall (son of previous chairman Sir John Hall, who had retired during the summer), were filmed in a Spanish brothel making a series of remarks to an undercover tabloid journalist. They ridiculed Shearer, boasted of "ripping off" supporters with the club shirts they sold, and called the women of Newcastle "dogs". Both subsequently resigned, and Sir John Hall returned as acting chairman for the remainder of the season.

Newcastle enjoyed a good run in the 1997–98 FA Cup and reached the final for the first time in 24 years. They never looked like winners, and the final whistle blew with a 2–0 scoreline giving the trophy to opponents Arsenal. But as Arsenal had completed the double, Newcastle entered the 1998–99 Cup Winners' Cup.

Dalglish's cautious brand of football proved unpopular with supporters used to Newcastle's previous swashbuckling style; more importantly this cautious style was not producing results. Many players signed by Dalglish were not considered to match the quality of those who had left the club this season. The team's 13th-place finish gave particular cause for concern, as Newcastle had finished runners-up in the last two seasons and had never finished below sixth since returning to the top flight in 1993. To add insult to injury, only 35 league goals were scored by the club all season.

Despite signing Dietmar Hamann, Nolberto Solano and Gary Speed, several unsuccessful transfer deals along with a poor start to the 1998–99 season led to Dalglish being sacked.

== Transfers ==
=== In ===
Date	Pos	Name	From	Fee
June 1997	MF	(Republic of Ireland) Paddy Kelly	(Scotland) Celtic	Free
June 1997	GK	(Republic of Ireland) Shay Given	(England) Blackburn Rovers	£1,500,000
June 1997	MF	(Georgia (country)) Temuri Ketsbaia	(Greece) AEK Athens	Free
July 1997	FW	(Denmark) Jon Dahl Tomasson	(Netherlands) Heerenveen	£2,200,000
July 1997	DF	(England) Stuart Pearce	(England) Nottingham Forest	Free
July 1997	DF	(Italy) Alessandro Pistone	(Italy) Inter Milan	£4,300,000
July 1997	DF	(Netherlands) Brian Pinas	(Netherlands) Feyenoord	Free
August 1997	MF	(England) John Barnes	(England) Liverpool	Free
August 1997	FW	(Wales) Ian Rush	(England) Leeds United	Free
October 1997	FW	(Australia) Carlos Gonzalez	(Australia) Sydney Olympic	Free
November 1997	MF	(Germany) Ralf Keidel	(Germany) Schweinfurt 05	Free
November 1997	FW	(Scotland) Paul Dalglish	(England) Liverpool	Free
November 1997	DF	(France) David Terrier	(England) West Ham United	Free
January 1998	FW	(Sweden) Andreas Andersson	(Italy) Milan	£3,600,000
January 1998	DF	(England) Andy Griffin	(England) Stoke City	£1,500,000
February 1998	MF	(Wales) Gary Speed	(England) Everton	£5,500,000
March 1998	MF	(England) James Coppinger	(England) Darlington	£250,000
March 1998	MF	(England) Paul Robinson	(England) Darlington	£250,000
March 1998	MF	(Scotland) Stephen Glass	(Scotland) Aberdeen	£650,000
March 1998	DF	(Greece) Nikos Dabizas	(Greece) Olympiacos	£1,400,000

- Total spending: ▼£17,450,000

=== Out ===
Date	Pos.	Name	To	Fee
June 1997	MF	(England) Lee Clark	(England) Sunderland	£2,500,000
July 1997	DF	(England) Robbie Elliott	(England) Bolton Wanderers	£2,250,000
July 1997	MF	(France) David Ginola	(England) Tottenham Hotspur	£2,000,000
July 1997	FW	(England) Les Ferdinand	(England) Tottenham Hotspur	£6,000,000
August 1997	MF	(England) Peter Beardsley	(England) Bolton Wanderers	£450,000
January 1998	FW	(Colombia) Faustino Asprilla	(Italy) Parma	£6,200,000
February 1998	DF	(England) John Beresford	(England) Southampton	£1,500,000
March 1998	MF	(Republic of Ireland) Jim Crawford	(England) Reading	£100,000
March 1998	FW	(England) Paul Brayson	(England) Reading	Free
May 1998	FW	(Netherlands) Brian Pinas	(Netherlands) Feyenoord	£150,000
May 1998	FW	(Wales) Ian Rush	(Wales) Wrexham	Free
May 1998	FW	(Australia) Carlos Gonzalez	Released	Free

- Total income: ▲£21,150,000

=== Coaching staff ===
Position	Staff
Manager	(Scotland) Kenny Dalglish
Assistant manager	(Scotland) Steve Clarke
Goalkeeping coach	(England) Andy Woodman
Development coach	(England) John Carver

Last updated: 3 May 2011

== Players ==
=== First-team squad ===
Squad at end of season

Note: Flags indicate national team as defined under FIFA eligibility rules; some limited exceptions apply. Players may hold more than one non-FIFA nationality.

No.	Pos.	Nation	Player
1	GK	IRL	Shay Given
2	DF	ENG	Warren Barton
4	MF	ENG	David Batty
5	DF	ENG	Darren Peacock
6	DF	ENG	Steve Howey
7	MF	ENG	Rob Lee (captain)
8	FW	WAL	Ian Rush
9	FW	ENG	Alan Shearer
10	MF	ENG	John Barnes
11	MF	WAL	Gary Speed
12	DF	ENG	Stuart Pearce
14	MF	GEO	Temuri Ketsbaia

No.	Pos.	Nation	Player
15	GK	TRI	Shaka Hislop
16	FW	DEN	Jon Dahl Tomasson
18	MF	NIR	Keith Gillespie
19	DF	ENG	Steve Watson
21	GK	CZE	Pavel Srníček
22	MF	ENG	Des Hamilton
23	DF	ITA	Alessandro Pistone
27	DF	BEL	Philippe Albert
28	DF	NIR	Aaron Hughes
34	DF	GRE	Nikos Dabizas
38	DF	ENG	Andy Griffin
40	FW	SWE	Andreas Andersson

=== Left club during season ===
Note: Flags indicate national team as defined under FIFA eligibility rules; some limited exceptions apply. Players may hold more than one non-FIFA nationality.

No.	Pos.	Nation	Player
3	DF	ENG	John Beresford (to Southampton)
8	MF	ENG	Peter Beardsley (to Bolton Wanderers)
11	FW	COL	Faustino Asprilla (to Parma)

No.	Pos.	Nation	Player
17	MF	IRL	Jimmy Crawford (to Reading)
25	FW	ENG	Paul Brayson (to Reading)

=== Reserve squad ===
The following players did not appear for the first-team this season.

Note: Flags indicate national team as defined under FIFA eligibility rules; some limited exceptions apply. Players may hold more than one non-FIFA nationality.

No.	Pos.	Nation	Player
20	MF	ISL	Bjarni Guðjónsson
24	MF	NED	Brian Pinas
26	MF	ENG	David Burt
29	GK	ENG	Steve Harper
30	DF	SCO	Paddy Kelly
31	MF	ENG	Stuart Elliott
32	MF	GER	Ralf Keidel
33	DF	FRA	David Terrier
35	FW	ENG	Paul Robinson

No.	Pos.	Nation	Player
39	GK	ENG	Peter Keen
—	DF	ENG	David Beharall
—	DF	SCO	Steven Caldwell
—	MF	ENG	Paul Arnison
—	MF	ENG	James Coppinger
—	MF	ENG	Jamie McClen
—	FW	ENG	Michael Chopra
—	FW	SCO	Paul Dalglish

== Statistics ==
=== Appearances, goals and cards ===
(Substitute appearances in brackets)

No.	Pos.	Name	League		FA Cup		League Cup		Europe		Total		Discipline	
No.	Pos.	Name	Apps	Goals	Apps	Goals	Apps	Goals	Apps	Goals	Apps	Goals	Yellow card	Red card
1	GK	(Republic of Ireland) Shay Given	24	0	4	0	0	0	6	0	34	0	1	0
2	DF	(England) Warren Barton	17+6	3	4+1	0	2	0	5	0	28+7	3	11	0
3	DF	(England) John Beresford	17+1	2	2+1	0	3	0	7	3	29+2	5	6	0
4	MF	(England) David Batty	32	1	6	1	2	0	7	0	47	2	14	3
5	DF	(England) Darren Peacock	19+1	0	1	0	2+1	0	4+1	0	26+3	0	6	0
6	DF	(England) Steve Howey	11+3	0	5	0	1	0	1+2	0	18+5	0	2	0
7	MF	(England) Robert Lee	26+2	4	6	0	2	0	6	0	40+2	4	5	0
8	FW	(Wales) Ian Rush	6+4	0	0+1	1	2	1	1	0	9+5	2	0	0
9	FW	(England) Alan Shearer	15+2	2	6	5	0	0	0	0	21+2	7	5	0
10	MF	(England) John Barnes	22+4	6	3+2	0	3	0	5	1	33+6	7	0	0
11	FW	(Colombia) Faustino Asprilla	8+2	2	1	0	0	0	5	4	14+2	6	1	0
11	MF	(Wales) Gary Speed	13	1	4	1	0	0	0	0	17	2	1	0
12	DF	(England) Stuart Pearce	25	0	7	0	0	0	3+1	1	35+1	1	5	0
14	MF	(Georgia (country)) Temuri Ketsbaia	16+15	3	2+4	1	1+1	0	3+5	1	22+25	5	3	0
15	GK	(Trinidad and Tobago) Shaka Hislop	13	0	3	0	3	0	2	0	21	0	0	0
16	FW	(Denmark) Jon Dahl Tomasson	17+6	3	2	0	2+1	1	6+1	0	27+8	4	2	0
18	MF	(Northern Ireland) Keith Gillespie	25+4	4	5	0	2	0	5+2	0	37+6	4	6	0
19	DF	(England) Steve Watson	27+2	1	3+1	0	2+1	0	8	0	40+4	1	5	0
21	GK	(Czech Republic) Pavel Srníček	1	0	0	0	0	0	0	0	1	0	0	0
22	DF	(England) Des Hamilton	7+5	0	1	0	1+1	1	2	0	11+6	1	0	0
23	DF	(Italy) Alessandro Pistone	28	0	5	0	1	0	5	0	39	0	9	0
25	FW	(England) Paul Brayson	0	0	0	0	0+1	0	0	0	0+1	0	0	0
27	DF	(Belgium) Philippe Albert	21+2	0	2+1	0	3	0	7+1	0	34+4	0	10	0
28	FW	(Northern Ireland) Aaron Hughes	4	0	0+1	0	1	0	0+2	0	5+3	0	0	0
34	DF	(Greece) Nikos Dabizas	10+1	1	2	0	0	0	0	0	12+1	1	3	0
38	DF	(England) Andy Griffin	4	0	0	0	0	0	0	0	4	0	0	0
40	FW	(Sweden) Andreas Andersson	10+2	2	2+1	0	0	0	0	0	12+3	2	0	0

== Matches ==
=== Pre-season ===
15 July 1997 Irish Tournament	Newcastle United	3–2	PSV Eindhoven	Dublin
	Gillespie 21'; Tomasson 24', 80'	Report	Bruggink 30'; Stam 75'	Stadium: Lansdowne Road; Attendance: 18,000

16 July 1997 Irish Tournament	Newcastle United	2–0	Derry City	Dublin
	Crawford 7'; Beardsley 36'	Report		Stadium: Lansdowne Road; Attendance: 20,854

19 July 1997 Friendly	Birmingham City	2–3	Newcastle United	Birmingham
15:00 BST	Devlin 4'; Furlong 79'		Tomasson 39'; Shearer 54'; Bennett 90' (o.g.)	Stadium: St Andrew's; Attendance: 13,799

26 July 1997 Umbro Cup	Chelsea	1–1 (3–1 p)	Newcastle United	Liverpool
14:00 BST	Poyet 63'	Report	Tomasson 45'	Stadium: Goodison Park; Attendance: 15,264; Referee: Stephen Lodge
	Penalties
	Sinclair (penalty scored); Nicholls (penalty scored); Leboeuf (penalty scored)		(penalty scored) Beardsley; (penalty missed) Pearce; (penalty missed) Asprilla; (penalty missed) Tomasson

27 July 1997 Umbro Cup	Newcastle United	0–3	Ajax	Liverpool
16:15 BST		Report	McCarthy 76', 86'; Oliseh 83'	Stadium: Goodison Park; Attendance: 10,289; Referee: Peter Jones

30 July 1997 Friendly	Bradford City	0–3	Newcastle United	Bradford
		Report	Asprilla 7'; Beardsley 27'; Watson 39'	Stadium: Valley Parade; Attendance: 8,470

3 August 1997 Friendly	Juventus	3–2	Newcastle United	Cesena
	Ferrara 1'; Inzaghi 3', 34'	Report	Asprilla 70', 82'	Stadium: Stadio Dino Manuzzi; Attendance: 22,511; Referee: Pasquale Rodomonti (Italy)

=== Premier League ===
9 August 1997 1	Newcastle United	2–1	Sheffield Wednesday	Newcastle upon Tyne
	Asprilla 2', 72'; Batty (yellow card)	(Report)	Carbone 8'; Atherton (yellow card); Stefanović (yellow card); Blondeau (yellow card); Hyde (yellow card)	Stadium: St James' Park; Attendance: 36,711; Referee: Peter Jones

23 August 1997 2	Newcastle United	1–0	Aston Villa	Newcastle upon Tyne
	Beresford 13'; Batty (yellow card) 53' (red card); Albert (yellow card); Ketsbaia (yellow card)	(Report)	Southgate (yellow card); Ehiogu (yellow card); Collymore (yellow card)	Stadium: St James' Park; Attendance: 36,783; Referee: Gary Willard

13 September 1997 3	Newcastle United	1–3	Wimbledon	Newcastle upon Tyne
	Barton 32'; Pistone (yellow card)	(Report)	Cort 2'; Perry 59'; Ekoku 76'; C. Hughes (yellow card); Gayle (yellow card)	Stadium: St James' Park; Attendance: 36,526

20 September 1997 4	West Ham United	0–1	Newcastle United	London
	Lomas (yellow card)	(Report)	Barnes 44'; Barton (yellow card); Lee (yellow card); Gillespie (yellow card)	Stadium: Upton Park; Attendance: 25,884; Referee: Steve Dunn

24 September 1997 5	Newcastle United	1–0	Everton	Newcastle upon Tyne
	Lee 87'	(Report)	Watson (yellow card); Bilić (yellow card) 62' (red card); Cadamarteri (yellow card)	Stadium: St James' Park; Attendance: 36,705; Referee: Graham Poll

27 September 1997 6	Chelsea	1–0	Newcastle United	London
	Poyet 75'	(Report)	Watson (yellow card)	Stadium: Stamford Bridge; Attendance: 31,563; Referee: Mike Riley

4 October 1997 7	Newcastle United	1–0	Tottenham Hotspur	Newcastle upon Tyne
	Barton 89'	(Report)	Calderwood (yellow card)	Stadium: St James' Park; Attendance: 36,709; Referee: Martin Bodenham

18 October 1997 8	Leeds United	4–1	Newcastle United	Leeds
	Ribeiro 30' (yellow card); Kewell 38'; John Beresford 43' (o.g.); Wetherall 47' (yellow card); Radebe (yellow card); Wallace (yellow card)	(Report)	Gillespie 62'; Barton (yellow card); Batty (yellow card)	Stadium: Elland Road; Attendance: 39,834; Referee: David Elleray

25 October 1997 9	Newcastle United	1–1	Blackburn Rovers	Newcastle upon Tyne
	Gillespie 27'; Peacock (yellow card); Ketsbaia (yellow card)	(Report)	Sutton 57'; Hendry (yellow card); Flitcroft (yellow card); Gallacher (yellow card); McKinlay (yellow card); Valéry (yellow card); Henchoz (yellow card)	Stadium: St James' Park; Attendance: 36,716; Referee: Jeff Winter

1 November 1997 10	Newcastle United	3–3	Leicester City	Newcastle upon Tyne
	Barnes 4' (pen.); Tomasson 45'; Beresford 90' (yellow card); Albert (yellow card)	(Report)	Marshall 12', 32' (yellow card); Elliott 54'; Izzet (yellow card); Heskey (red card) 90'	Stadium: St James' Park; Attendance: 36,754; Referee: G. Willard

8 November 1997 11	Coventry City	2–2	Newcastle United	Coventry
	Dublin 4', 82'; Williams (yellow card); Hall (yellow card)	(Report)	Barnes 31'; Lee 87'; Albert (yellow card)	Stadium: Highfield Road; Attendance: 22,679; Referee: Paul Durkin

22 November 1997 12	Newcastle United	2–1	Southampton	Newcastle upon Tyne
	Barnes 55', 75'; Albert (yellow card)	(Report)	Davies 5'; Lundekvam (yellow card); Hirst (yellow card)	Stadium: St James' Park; Attendance: 36,759; Referee: Dermot Gallagher

29 November 1997 13	Crystal Palace	1–2	Newcastle United	London
	Shipperley 67'; Warhurst (yellow card)	(Report)	Ketsbaia 45'; Tomasson 63'; Batty (yellow card); Peacock (yellow card); Lee (yellow card)	Stadium: Selhurst Park; Attendance: 26,085; Referee: Mike Riley

1 December 1997 14	Bolton Wanderers	1–0	Newcastle United	Bolton
	Blake 22'; Pollock (yellow card)	(Report)	Pearce (yellow card); Gillespie (yellow card)	Stadium: Reebok Stadium; Attendance: 24,494; Referee: Neale Barry

6 December 1997 15	Newcastle United	0–1	Arsenal	Newcastle upon Tyne
		(Report)	Wright 36'; Adams (yellow card); Petit (yellow card)	Stadium: St James' Park; Attendance: 36,751; Referee: Steve Dunn

13 December 1997 16	Barnsley	2–2	Newcastle United	Barnsley
	Redfearn 9'; Hendrie 75'; Barnard (yellow card)	(Report)	Gillespie 44', 49'; Batty (yellow card); Peacock (yellow card); Pistone (yellow card); Albert (yellow card)	Stadium: Oakwell; Attendance: 18,687; Referee: Paul Alcock

17 December 1997 17	Newcastle United	0–0	Derby County	Newcastle upon Tyne
	Albert (yellow card); Ketsbaia (yellow card)	(Report)	D Powell (yellow card); Carsley (yellow card); Eranio (yellow card) 80' (red card)	Stadium: St James' Park; Attendance: 36,289; Referee: Keith Burge

21 December 1997 18	Newcastle United	0–1	Manchester United	Newcastle upon Tyne
	Peacock (yellow card); Pistone (yellow card); Batty (yellow card); Gillespie (yellow card)	(Report)	Cole 66' (yellow card); P Neville (yellow card); Butt (yellow card)	Stadium: St James' Park; Attendance: 36,767; Referee: Peter Jones

26 December 1997 19	Derby County	1–0	Newcastle United	Derby
	Eranio 4' (pen.) (yellow card); Rowett (yellow card); D Powell (yellow card)	(Report)	Beresford (yellow card); Batty (yellow card) 64' (red card); Pearce (yellow card); Tomasson (yellow card)	Stadium: Pride Park Stadium; Attendance: 30,232; Referee: M.Reed

28 December 1997 20	Newcastle United	1–2	Liverpool	Newcastle upon Tyne
	Watson 16'	(Report)	McManaman 31', 43'; Redknapp (yellow card)	Stadium: St James' Park; Attendance: 36,702; Referee: Gerald Ashby

10 January 1998 21	Sheffield Wednesday	2–1	Newcastle United	Sheffield
	Di Canio 1' (yellow card); Newsome 51'; Hyde (yellow card); Humphreys (yellow card)	(Report)	Tomasson 20'; Beresford (yellow card); Watson (yellow card)	Stadium: Hillsborough Stadium; Attendance: 29,446; Referee: David Elleray

17 January 1998 22	Newcastle United	2–1	Bolton Wanderers	Newcastle upon Tyne
	Barnes 6'; Ketsbaia 90'; Barton (yellow card)	(Report)	Blake 72'; A. Todd (yellow card); Frandsen (yellow card)	Stadium: St James' Park; Attendance: 36,767; Referee: Graham Poll

20 January 1998 23	Liverpool	1–0	Newcastle United	Liverpool
	Owen 17'; McAteer (yellow card); Babb (yellow card); McManaman (yellow card)	(Report)	Barton (yellow card)	Stadium: Anfield; Attendance: 42,791; Referee: Graham Barber

1 February 1998 24	Aston Villa	0–1	Newcastle United	Birmingham
		(Report)	Batty 58'	Stadium: Villa Park; Attendance: 38,266; Referee: Stephen Lodge

7 February 1998 25	Newcastle United	0–1	West Ham United	Newcastle upon Tyne
	Batty (yellow card)	(Report)	Lazaridis 16'; Moncur (yellow card); Impey (yellow card)	Stadium: St James' Park; Attendance: 36,736; Referee: Uriah Rennie

22 February 1998 26	Newcastle United	1–1	Leeds United	Newcastle upon Tyne
	Ketsbaia 87'; Batty (yellow card)	(Report)	Wallace 82' (yellow card); Kelly (yellow card); Haaland (yellow card); Ribeiro (yellow card); Kewell (yellow card)	Stadium: St James' Park; Attendance: 36,511; Referee: G.Willard

28 February 1998 27	Everton	0–0	Newcastle United	Liverpool
		(Report)	Lee (yellow card)	Stadium: Goodison Park; Attendance: 37,972; Referee: Mike Riley

14 March 1998 28	Newcastle United	0–0	Coventry City	Newcastle upon Tyne
	Albert (yellow card)	(Report)	Whelan (yellow card)	Stadium: St James' Park; Attendance: 36,767; Referee: Peter Jones

18 March 1998 29	Newcastle United	1–2	Crystal Palace	Newcastle upon Tyne
	Shearer 77' (yellow card); Barton (yellow card); Dabizas (yellow card); Batty (yellow card)	(Report)	Lombardo 14'; Jansen 23'; Brolin (yellow card); Ismaël (yellow card)	Stadium: St James' Park; Attendance: 36,565; Referee: Stephen Lodge

28 March 1998 30	Southampton	2–1	Newcastle United	Southampton
	Pearce 69' (o.g.); Le Tissier 85' (pen.) (yellow card); Palmer (yellow card); Lundekvam (yellow card); Oakley (yellow card)	(Report)	Lee 46'; Pistone (yellow card)	Stadium: The Dell; Attendance: 15,251; Referee: Graham Barber

31 March 1998 31	Wimbledon	0–0	Newcastle United	London
		(Report)		Stadium: Selhurst Park; Attendance: 15,478; Referee: Neale Barry

11 April 1998 32	Arsenal	3–1	Newcastle United	London
	Anelka 41', 64'; Vieira 72'	(Report)	Barton 79' (yellow card); Albert (yellow card)	Stadium: Highbury; Attendance: 38,102; Referee: G.Willard

13 April 1998 33	Newcastle United	2–1	Barnsley	Newcastle upon Tyne
	Andersson 40'; Shearer 86'; Barton (yellow card); Pearce (yellow card)	(Report)	Fjørtoft 50'; Eaden (yellow card); Moses (yellow card); Bullock (yellow card); Bosančić (yellow card)	Stadium: St James' Park; Attendance: 36,534; Referee: Steve Dunn

18 April 1998 34	Manchester United	1–1	Newcastle United	Manchester
	Beckham 38' (yellow card); Pallister (yellow card); Solskjær (red card) 89'	(Report)	Andersson 11'; Given (yellow card); Shearer (yellow card); Pistone (yellow card)	Stadium: Old Trafford; Attendance: 55,194; Referee: Uriah Rennie

25 April 1998 35	Tottenham Hotspur	2–0	Newcastle United	London
	Klinsmann 31'; Ferdinand 73' (yellow card); Vega (yellow card)	(Report)	Watson (yellow card); Pistone (yellow card)	Stadium: White Hart Lane; Attendance: 35,847; Referee: Jeff Winter

29 April 1998 36	Leicester City	0–0	Newcastle United	Leicester
	Lennon (yellow card)	(Report)	Barton (yellow card); Speed (yellow card); Dabizas (yellow card)	Stadium: Filbert Street; Attendance: 21,699; Referee: Martin Bodenham

2 May 1998 37	Newcastle United	3–1	Chelsea	Newcastle upon Tyne
	Dabizas 39'; Lee 42'; Speed 59'; Pearce (yellow card)	(Report)	Di Matteo 77'; Leboeuf (yellow card); Vialli (yellow card)	Stadium: St James' Park; Attendance: 36,710; Referee: Keith Burge

10 May 1998 38	Blackburn Rovers	1–0	Newcastle United	Blackburn
	Sutton 88'; Hendry (yellow card); Dahlin (yellow card); Henchoz (yellow card)	(Report)	Batty (red card) 65'	Stadium: Ewood Park; Attendance: 29,300; Referee: David Elleray

Pos	Team	Pld	W	D	L	GF	GA	GD	Pts	Qualification or relegation
11	Coventry City	38	12	16	10	46	44	+2	52	
12	Southampton	38	14	6	18	50	55	−5	48	
13	Newcastle United	38	11	11	16	35	44	−9	44	Qualification for the Cup Winners' Cup first round (Note: As Arsenal qualified for the Champions League, their Cup Winners' Cup place as FA Cup winners defaulted to Newcastle United, the runners-up.)
14	Tottenham Hotspur	38	11	11	16	44	56	−12	44	
15	Wimbledon	38	10	14	14	34	46	−12	44	

Source: Premier League
Rules for classification: 1) points; 2) goal difference; 3) number of goals scored.

=== Champions League ===
13 August 1997 Second qualifying round, First leg	Newcastle United	2–1	Croatia Zagreb	Newcastle upon Tyne
20:05 BST	Beresford 21', 75'	Report	Cvitanović 51'	Stadium: St James' Park; Attendance: 34,465; Referee: Václav Krondl (Czech Republic)

27 August 1997 Second qualifying round, Second leg	Croatia Zagreb	2–2 (a.e.t.) (3–4 agg.)	Newcastle United	Zagreb
20:15	Šimić 58'; Cvitanović 90+2'	Report	Asprilla 43' (pen.); Ketsbaia 119'	Stadium: Stadion Maksimir; Attendance: 34,000; Referee: Urs Meier (Switzerland)

17 September 1997 Group C	Newcastle United	3–2	Barcelona	Newcastle upon Tyne
19:45 BST	Asprilla 22' (pen.), 30', 48'; Batty (yellow card)	Report	Luis Enrique 72'; Figo 88'; De la Peña (yellow card)	Stadium: St James' Park; Attendance: 35,274; Referee: Pierluigi Collina (Italy)

1 October 1997 Group C	Dynamo Kyiv	2–2	Newcastle United	Kyiv
21:45	Rebrov 4'; Shevchenko 28'		Beresford 78'; Golovko 85' (o.g.); Asprilla (yellow card); Gillespie (yellow card)	Stadium: Lobanovskyi Dynamo Stadium; Attendance: 100,000; Referee: Peter Mikkelsen (Denmark)

22 October 1997 Group C	PSV Eindhoven	1–0	Newcastle United	Eindhoven
20:45	Jonk 38'; Vampeta (yellow card); Stam (yellow card); Iwan (yellow card)		Batty (yellow card); Peacock (yellow card); Lee (yellow card); Tomasson (yellow card)	Stadium: Philips Stadion; Attendance: 29,200; Referee: Stefano Braschi (Italy)

5 November 1997 Group C	Newcastle United	0–2	PSV Eindhoven	Newcastle upon Tyne
19:45 BST	Gillespie (yellow card)		Nilis 32'; De Bilde 90' (yellow card); Faber (yellow card)	Stadium: St James' Park; Attendance: 35,214; Referee: Günter Benkö (Austria)

26 November 1997 Group C	Barcelona	1–0	Newcastle United	Barcelona
20:45	Giovanni 17'			Stadium: Camp Nou; Attendance: 26,000; Referee: Marc Batta (France)

10 December 1997 Group C	Newcastle United	2–0	Dynamo Kyiv	Newcastle upon Tyne
19:45	Barnes 10'; Pearce 21'; Albert (yellow card); Gillespie (yellow card)		Bezhenar (yellow card)	Stadium: St James' Park; Attendance: 33,694; Referee: Hellmut Krug (Germany)

=== FA Cup ===
4 January 1998 Third round	Everton	0–1	Newcastle United	Liverpool
19:45 BST	Grant (yellow card); Oster (yellow card); Ferguson (yellow card)	Report	Rush 67'; Beresford (yellow card); Peacock (yellow card); Lee (yellow card); Pistone (yellow card)	Stadium: Goodison Park; Attendance: 20,885; Referee: Martin Bodenham

25 January 1998 Fourth round	Stevenage Borough	1–1	Newcastle United	Stevenage
16:30 BST	Grazioli 41'; Perkins (yellow card); Crawshaw (yellow card)	Report	Shearer 3'; Beresford (yellow card); Shearer (yellow card); Pistone (yellow card)	Stadium: Broadhall Way; Attendance: 8,040; Referee: Peter Jones

4 February 1998 Fourth round replay	Newcastle United	2–1	Stevenage Borough	Newcastle upon Tyne
19:45 BST	Shearer 16', 65'	Report	Crawshaw 74'; Trott (yellow card); Beevor (yellow card)	Stadium: St James' Park; Attendance: 36,705; Referee: Peter Jones

14 February 1998 Fifth round	Newcastle United	1–0	Tranmere Rovers	Newcastle upon Tyne
19:45 BST	Shearer 22'; Pistone (yellow card)	Report	McGreal (yellow card); Mellon (yellow card); Hill (yellow card)	Stadium: St James' Park; Attendance: 36,675; Referee: Gerald Ashby

8 March 1998 Sixth round	Newcastle United	3–1	Barnsley	Newcastle upon Tyne
16:30 BST	Ketsbaia 16'; Speed 27'; Batty 90' (yellow card); Barton (yellow card); Pearce (yellow card); Howey (yellow card); Shearer (yellow card)		Liddell 57'; Barnard (yellow card); Moses (yellow card) 76' (red card); Morgan (yellow card); Redfearn (yellow card)	Stadium: St James' Park; Attendance: 36,695; Referee: Neale Barry

5 April 1998 Semi-finals	Newcastle United	1–0	Sheffield United	Manchester
15:00 BST	Shearer 60'	Report	Borbokis (yellow card); Sandford (yellow card); Holdsworth (yellow card); Marker (yellow card)	Stadium: Old Trafford; Attendance: 53,452; Referee: Graham Poll

16 May 1998 Final	Arsenal	2–0	Newcastle United	London
15:00 BST	Overmars 23'; Anelka 69'; Winterburn (yellow card)	Report	Barton (yellow card); Howey (yellow card); Shearer (yellow card); Dabizas (yellow card)	Stadium: Wembley Stadium; Attendance: 79,183; Referee: Paul Durkin

=== League Cup ===
15 October 1997 Third round	Newcastle United	2–0	Hull City	Newcastle upon Tyne
19:45 BST	Hamilton 47'; Rush 83'; Albert (yellow card)		Rioch (yellow card)	Stadium: St James' Park; Attendance: 35,856; Referee: Kevin Lynch

18 November 1997 Fourth round	Derby County	0–1	Newcastle United	Derby
19:45 BST			Tomasson 72'	Stadium: Pride Park Stadium; Attendance: 27,364; Referee: Martin Bodenham

7 January 1998 Quarter-finals	Newcastle United	0–2 (a.e.t.)	Liverpool	Newcastle upon Tyne
19:45 BST			Owen 95'; Fowler 103'; Matteo (yellow card); Redknapp (yellow card)	Stadium: St James' Park; Attendance: 33,207; Referee: Dermot Gallagher
