= 1998–99 Newcastle United F.C. season =

Newcastle United
1998–99 season
- Chairman: David Cassidy (until 18 December); Freddy Shepherd (from 20 December)
- Manager: Kenny Dalglish (until 27 August); Ruud Gullit (from 27 August)
- Stadium: St James' Park
- Premier League: 13th
- UEFA Cup Winners' Cup: First round
- FA Cup: Runners-up
- League Cup: Fourth round
- Top goalscorer: League: Alan Shearer (14); All: Alan Shearer (21)
- Average home league attendance: 36,665
Home colours	Away colours

In the 1998–99 season, Newcastle United competed in the FA Premier League. Newcastle's season was an almost carbon copy of the one before. They finished 13th in the Premiership and lost in the FA Cup final to enter Europe because the winning side had already qualified for the Champions League.

Just after the season started, Kenny Dalglish paid for Newcastle's sub-standard league performances with his job. The task was given to Ruud Gullit to turn things round, but he could not improve on the club's previous league finish of 13th. A dismal league position put them below local rivals Middlesbrough as well as other unfancied sides including Derby County and Sheffield Wednesday.

== Season summary ==
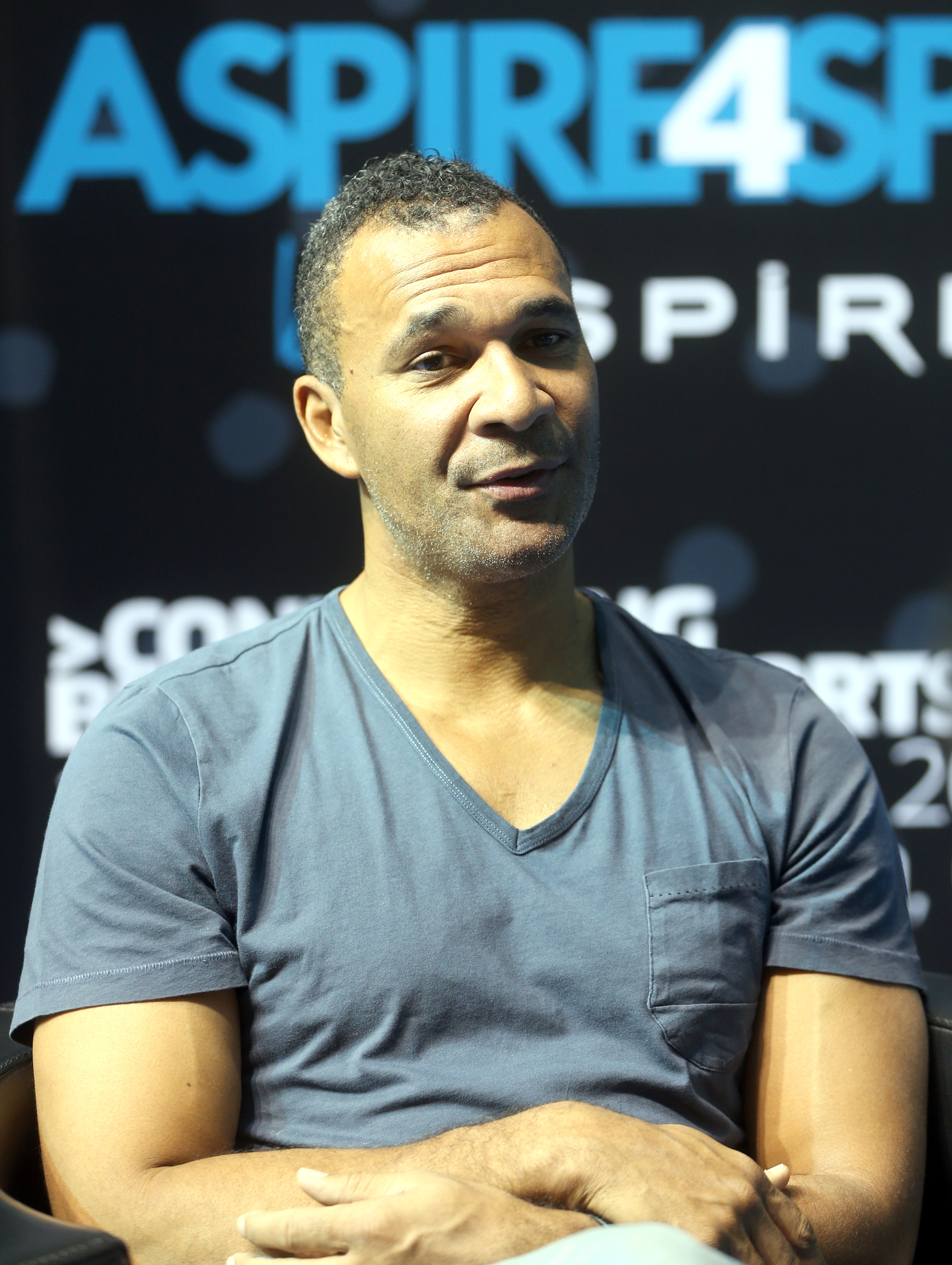
Ruud Gullit

A poor start to the 1998–99 season led to Kenny Dalglish being sacked. Ruud Gullit, a trophy winning manager with Chelsea a few years previously, was put in charge. The team again started promisingly, but was knocked out of the Cup Winners' Cup in the first round.

Gullit made some high-profile mistakes in the transfer market (notably, Spanish defender Marcelino and forward Silvio Maric bore the brunt of supporters frustrations). Less forgivably, he also fell out with several senior players, including the club captain Rob Lee, who had been the heartbeat of the team for the previous half decade, and was initially not given a squad number.

Newcastle made it to the 1998–99 FA Cup final, their second final in successive seasons. This time around they were to lose to Manchester United 2–0.

Because the FA Cup winners had already won European qualification, this meant Newcastle reached Europe for the fourth season running: this time the 1999–2000 UEFA Cup, due to the discontinuation of the Cup Winners' Cup.

Gullit resigned shortly after the start of the 1999–2000 season.

Off the pitch, controversy was caused when former chairman Freddy Shepherd, who had been forced to resign due to controversy over remarks made in the press the previous season, successfully manoeuvred to reinstate himself to the position within less than a year.

== Transfers ==
=== In ===
Date	Pos.	Name	From	Fee
June 1998	MF	(Greece) Georgios Georgiadis	(Greece) Panathinaikos	£500,000
June 1998	GK	(France) Lionel Perez	(England) Sunderland	Free
June 1998	FW	(France) Stéphane Guivarc'h	(France) Auxerre	£3,500,000
July 1998	DF	(England) Carl Serrant	(England) Oldham Athletic	£500,000
July 1998	MF	(Scotland) Garry Brady	(England) Tottenham Hotspur	£650,000
July 1998	DF	(France) Laurent Charvet	(France) Cannes	£750,000
August 1998	MF	(Germany) Dietmar Hamann	(Germany) Bayern Munich	£4,500,000
August 1998	MF	(Peru) Nolberto Solano	(Argentina) Boca Juniors	£2,500,000
November 1998	FW	(Scotland) Duncan Ferguson	(England) Everton	£8,000,000
January 1999	FW	(France) Louis Saha	(France) Metz	Loan
January 1999	DF	(France) Didier Domi	(France) PSG	£4,000,000
March 1999	MF	(Croatia) Silvio Marić	Croatia Zagreb	£3,650,000

- Total spending: ▼£28.55m

=== Out ===
Date	Pos.	Name	From	Fee
June 1998	FW	(Denmark) Jon Dahl Tomasson	(Netherlands) Feyenoord	£2,500,000
June 1998	DF	(England) Darren Peacock	(England) Blackburn Rovers	£100,000
July 1998	GK	(Trinidad and Tobago) Shaka Hislop	(England) West Ham United	Free
July 1998	GK	(Czech Republic) Pavel Srníček	(Czech Republic) Banik Ostrava	Free
8 December 1998	MF	(England) David Batty	(England) Leeds United	£4,400,000

- Total spending: ▼£2.6m

== Players ==
=== First-team squad ===
Note: Flags indicate national team as defined under FIFA eligibility rules; some limited exceptions apply. Players may hold more than one non-FIFA nationality.

No.	Pos.	Nation	Player
1	GK	IRL	Shay Given
2	DF	ENG	Warren Barton
3	DF	ENG	Stuart Pearce
4	DF	FRA	Didier Domi
5	DF	ITA	Alessandro Pistone
6	DF	ENG	Steve Howey
7	MF	ENG	Rob Lee
9	FW	ENG	Alan Shearer (captain)
10	MF	CRO	Silvio Marić
11	MF	WAL	Gary Speed
12	MF	GER	Dietmar Hamann
13	GK	ENG	Steve Harper
14	MF	GEO	Temur Ketsbaia
15	MF	GRE	Georgios Georgiadis
16	DF	FRA	Laurent Charvet

No.	Pos.	Nation	Player
17	MF	SCO	Stephen Glass
18	FW	FRA	Louis Saha
20	FW	SCO	Duncan Ferguson
21	DF	ENG	Carl Serrant
24	MF	PER	Nolberto Solano
25	FW	SCO	Paul Dalglish
27	DF	BEL	Philippe Albert
28	DF	NIR	Aaron Hughes
29	MF	SCO	Garry Brady
33	DF	ENG	David Beharall
34	DF	GRE	Nikos Dabizas
36	MF	ENG	Jamie McClen
38	DF	ENG	Andy Griffin
40	FW	SWE	Andreas Andersson

=== Left club during season ===
Note: Flags indicate national team as defined under FIFA eligibility rules; some limited exceptions apply. Players may hold more than one non-FIFA nationality.

No.	Pos.	Nation	Player
4	MF	ENG	David Batty (to Leeds United)
8	FW	FRA	Stéphane Guivarc'h (to Rangers)
10	MF	ENG	John Barnes (to Charlton Athletic)
18	MF	NIR	Keith Gillespie (to Blackburn Rovers)

No.	Pos.	Nation	Player
19	DF	ENG	Steve Watson (to Aston Villa)
—	MF	ISL	Bjarni Guðjónsson (released)
—	DF	FRA	David Terrier (to Nice)

=== Reserve squad ===
Note: Flags indicate national team as defined under FIFA eligibility rules; some limited exceptions apply. Players may hold more than one non-FIFA nationality.

No.	Pos.	Nation	Player
22	MF	ENG	Des Hamilton
23	GK	FRA	Lionel Perez
26	MF	ENG	David Burt
30	DF	SCO	Paddy Kelly
31	MF	ENG	Stuart Elliott

No.	Pos.	Nation	Player
32	MF	GER	Ralf Keidel
35	FW	ENG	Paul Robinson
37	DF	SCO	Steven Caldwell
39	GK	ENG	Peter Keen

=== Trialists ===
Note: Flags indicate national team as defined under FIFA eligibility rules; some limited exceptions apply. Players may hold more than one non-FIFA nationality.

No.	Pos.	Nation	Player
—	GK	GER	Marc Ziegler (on trial from VfB Stuttgart)
—	GK		Juan Carlos Martin (on trial from San Pedro)

No.	Pos.	Nation	Player
—	MF		Miguel Aguilar (on trial from San Pedro)

== Statistics ==
=== Appearances, goals and cards ===
(Starts + substitute appearances)

No.	Pos.	Name	League		FA Cup		League Cup		Europe		Total		Discipline	
No.	Pos.	Name	Apps	Goals	Apps	Goals	Apps	Goals	Apps	Goals	Apps	Goals	Yellow card	Red card
1	GK	(Republic of Ireland) Shay Given	31	0	6	0	2	0	2	0	41	0	0	1
2	DF	(England) Warren Barton	18+6	0	5	0	1	0	0	0	24+6	0	5	0
3	DF	(England) Stuart Pearce	12	0	0	0	2	0	2	0	16	0	1	1
4	MF	(England) David Batty	6+2	0	0	0	2	0	1	0	9+2	0	4	0
4	DF	(France) Didier Domi	14	0	4	0	0	0	0	0	18	0	1	0
5	DF	(Italy) Alessandro Pistone	2+1	0	0	0	0	0	0	0	2+1	0	1	0
6	DF	(England) Steve Howey	14	0	4	0	0	0	0	0	18	0	1	0
7	MF	(England) Rob Lee	20+6	0	3	0	0	0	1	0	24+6	0	6	0
8	FW	(France) Stéphane Guivarc'h	2+2	1	0	0	0	0	0	0	2+2	1	0	0
9	FW	(England) Alan Shearer	29+1	14	6	5	2	1	2	1	39+1	21	7	0
10	MF	(England) John Barnes	0+1	0	0	0	0	0	0	0	0+1	0	0	0
10	MF	(Croatia) Silvio Marić	9+1	0	1+2	0	0	0	0	0	10+3	0	1	0
11	MF	(Wales) Gary Speed	34+3	4	6	1	1+1	0	2	0	43+4	5	8	0
12	MF	(Germany) Dietmar Hamann	22+1	4	7	1	1	0	0	0	30+1	5	7	1
13	GK	(England) Steve Harper	7+1	0	1+1	0	0	0	0	0	8+2	0	0	0
14	MF	(Georgia (country)) Temuri Ketsbaia	14+12	5	6	3	0	0	2	0	22+12	8	2	0
15	MF	(Greece) Georgios Georgiadis	7+3	0	0+2	1	1	0	0	0	8+5	1	2	0
16	DF	(France) Laurent Charvet	30+1	1	5	0	1	0	2	0	38+1	1	3	0
17	MF	(Scotland) Stephen Glass	18+4	3	2+2	0	2	0	2	0	24+6	3	1	0
18	MF	(Northern Ireland) Keith Gillespie	5+2	0	0	0	0+1	0	0	0	5+3	0	0	0
18	FW	(France) Louis Saha	5+6	1	1	1	0	0	0	0	6+6	2	1	0
19	DF	(England) Steve Watson	7	0	0	0	0	0	1	0	8	0	0	0
20	FW	(Scotland) Duncan Ferguson	7	2	0+2	0	0	0	0	0	7+2	2	0	0
21	DF	(England) Carl Serrant	3+1	0	0	0	0	0	0	0	3+1	0	1	0
24	MF	(Peru) Nolberto Solano	24+4	6	7	0	1	0	1+1	0	33+5	6	3	0
25	FW	(Scotland) Paul Dalglish	6+5	1	0	0	2	1	0	0	8+5	2	2	0
27	DF	(Belgium) Philippe Albert	3+3	0	0	0	0	0	0+1	0	3+4	0	2	0
28	DF	(Northern Ireland) Aaron Hughes	12+2	0	1+1	0	1	0	0	0	14+3	0	1	0
29	MF	(Scotland) Garry Brady	3+6	0	2+1	0	0	0	0	0	5+7	0	0	0
33	DF	(England) David Beharall	4	0	0	0	0	0	0	0	4	0	0	0
34	DF	(Greece) Nikos Dabizas	25+5	3	6	0	2	0	2	1	35+5	4	8	2
36	MF	(England) Jamie McClen	1	0	0	0	0	0	0	0	1	0	0	0
38	DF	(England) Andy Griffin	14	0	3	0	1	0	1	0	19	0	2	0
40	FW	(Sweden) Andreas Andersson	10+4	2	1	0	0	0	1	0	12+4	2	0	0

=== Starting 11 ===
- GK: #1, (Republic of Ireland) Shay Given, 41
- RB: #2, (England) Warren Barton, 24
- CB: #6, (England) Steve Howey, 18 (#38, (England) Andy Griffin, has 18 starts as a RB)
- CB: #34, (Greece) Nikos Dabizas, 35
- LB: #16, (France) Laurent Charvet, 38
- RM: #24, (Peru) Nolberto Solano, 33
- CM: #7, (England) Rob Lee, 24 (#17, (Scotland) Stephen Glass, has 24 starts as a LM)
- CM: #12, (Germany) Dietmar Hamann, 30
- LM: #11, (Wales) Gary Speed, 43
- CF: #9, (England) Alan Shearer, 39
- CF: #14, (Georgia (country)) Temuri Ketsbaia, 22

== Coaching staff ==
Position	Staff
Manager	(Netherlands) Ruud Gullit
Assistant manager	(Scotland) Steve Clarke
Goalkeeping coach	(England) Andy Woodman
Reserve team coach	(England) Terry McDermott

Last updated: 3 May 2011

== Results ==
=== Pre-season ===
27 July 1998	Bohemian	1–1	Newcastle United	Dublin
	Swan 78' (pen.)		Keidel 73'	Stadium: Dalymount Park; Attendance: 5,000

1 August 1998 JD Sports Cup	Newcastle United	0–0 (3–4 p)	Benfica	Middlesbrough
				Stadium: Riverside Stadium; Attendance: 5,430
	Penalties
	Watson (penalty scored); Pearce (penalty scored); Ketsbaia (penalty scored)		Penalty scored

2 August 1998 JD Sports Cup	Middlesbrough	1–1 (3–4 p)	Newcastle United	Middlesbrough
	Mustoe 27'		Shearer 50' (pen.)	Stadium: Riverside Stadium; Attendance: 5,230
	Penalties
	Penalty scored		Shearer (penalty scored); Lee (penalty scored); Albert (penalty scored); Pistone (penalty scored)

5 August 1998	Bray Wanderers	0–6	Newcastle United	Bray
			Shearer 11', 29', 41'; Dalglish 61', 88'; Hamann 81'	Stadium: Carlisle Grounds; Attendance: 5,700

10 August 1998	Newcastle United	2–1	Juventus	Newcastle upon Tyne
	Hamann 25'; Pearce 40'		Blanchard 88'	Stadium: St James' Park; Attendance: 32,590

=== FA Premier League ===
Pos	Team	Pld	W	D	L	GF	GA	GD	Pts	Qualification or relegation
11	Tottenham Hotspur	38	11	14	13	47	50	−3	47	Qualification for the UEFA Cup first round (Note: Tottenham Hotspur qualified for the UEFA Cup as League Cup winners.)
12	Sheffield Wednesday	38	13	7	18	41	42	−1	46	
13	Newcastle United	38	11	13	14	48	54	−6	46	Qualification for the UEFA Cup first round (Note: As Manchester United qualified for the Champions League, their UEFA Cup place as FA Cup winners defaulted to Newcastle United, the runners-up.)
14	Everton	38	11	10	17	42	47	−5	43	
15	Coventry City	38	11	9	18	39	51	−12	42	

Source: Premier League
Rules for classification: 1) points; 2) goal difference; 3) number of goals scored.

==== Results by matchday ====
15 August 1998 1	Newcastle United	0–0	Charlton Athletic	Newcastle upon Tyne
			Rufus (red card) 25'	Stadium: St James' Park; Attendance: 36,719; Referee: Dermot Gallagher

22 August 1998 2	Chelsea	1–1	Newcastle United	London
	Babayaro 23'		Andersson 43'	Stadium: Stamford Bridge; Attendance: 34,795; Referee: Uriah Rennie

30 August 1998 3	Newcastle United	1–4	Liverpool	Newcastle upon Tyne
	Guivarc'h 28'		Owen 17', 18', 32'; Berger 45'	Stadium: St James' Park; Attendance: 36,740; Referee: Graham Barber

9 September 1998 4	Aston Villa	1–0	Newcastle United	Birmingham
	Hendrie 64' (pen.)			Stadium: Villa Park; Attendance: 39,241; Referee: Graham Poll

12 September 1998 5	Newcastle United	4–0	Southampton	Newcastle upon Tyne
	Shearer 8', 37' (pen.); Marshall 88' (o.g.); Ketsbaia 90'		Dodd (red card) 38'	Stadium: St James' Park; Attendance: 36,454; Referee: Mike Riley

19 September 1998 6	Coventry City	1–5	Newcastle United	Coventry
	Whelan 4'		Dabizas 14'; Shearer 42', 90'; Speed 43'; Glass 58'	Stadium: Highfield Road; Attendance: 22,656; Referee: R. Harris

26 September 1998 7	Newcastle United	2–0	Nottingham Forest	Newcastle upon Tyne
	Shearer 11', 88' (pen.)			Stadium: St James' Park; Attendance: 36,760; Referee: David Elleray

4 October 1998 8	Arsenal	3–0	Newcastle United	London
	Bergkamp 21', 66' (pen.); Anelka 29'		Dabizas (yellow card) 65' (red card)	Stadium: Highbury; Attendance: 38,102; Referee: Mike Reed

17 October 1998 9	Newcastle United	2–1	Derby County	Newcastle upon Tyne
	Dabizas 13'; Glass 17'		Griffin 73' (o.g.)	Stadium: St James' Park; Attendance: 36,750; Referee: Keith Burge

24 October 1998 10	Tottenham Hotspur	2–0	Newcastle United	London
	Iversen 39', 76'; Calderwood (yellow card) 86' (red card)			Stadium: White Hart Lane; Attendance: 36,047; Referee: Graham Barber

31 October 1998 11	Newcastle United	0–3	West Ham United	Newcastle upon Tyne
	Dabizas (red card) 48'		Wright 56', 90'; Sinclair 76'	Stadium: St James' Park; Attendance: 36,744; Referee: Graham Poll

8 November 1998 12	Manchester United	0–0	Newcastle United	Manchester
				Stadium: Old Trafford; Attendance: 55,174; Referee: Steve Dunn

14 November 1998 13	Newcastle United	1–1	Sheffield Wednesday	Newcastle upon Tyne
	Dalglish 4'		Rudi 80'	Stadium: St James' Park; Attendance: 36,698; Referee: Peter Jones

23 November 1998 14	Everton	1–0	Newcastle United	Liverpool
	Ball 18'			Stadium: Goodison Park; Attendance: 30,357; Referee: Neale Barry

28 November 1998 15	Newcastle United	3–1	Wimbledon	Newcastle upon Tyne
	Solano 37'; Ferguson 59', 90'		Gayle 33'	Stadium: St James' Park; Attendance: 36,623; Referee: Uriah Rennie

6 December 1998 16	Middlesbrough	2–2	Newcastle United	Middlesbrough
	Townsend 13'; Cooper 59'		Charvet 39'; Dabizas 84'	Stadium: Riverside Stadium; Attendance: 34,629; Referee: Uriah Rennie

12 December 1998 17	Blackburn Rovers	0–0	Newcastle United	Blackburn
				Stadium: Ewood Park; Attendance: 27,569; Referee: R. Harris

19 December 1998 18	Newcastle United	1–0	Leicester City	Newcastle upon Tyne
	Glass 66'			Stadium: St James' Park; Attendance: 36,718; Referee: Jeff Winter

26 December 1998 19	Newcastle United	0–3	Leeds United	Newcastle upon Tyne
			Kewell 38'; Bowyer 62'; Hasselbaink 90'	Stadium: St James' Park; Attendance: 36,783; Referee: G. Willard

28 December 1998 20	Liverpool	4–2	Newcastle United	Liverpool
	Owen 67', 80'; Riedle 71', 84'		Solano 29'; Hamann (yellow card) 30' (red card); Andersson 56'	Stadium: Anfield; Attendance: 44,605; Referee: Stephen Lodge

9 January 1999 21	Newcastle United	0–1	Chelsea	Newcastle upon Tyne
			Petrescu 39'	Stadium: St James' Park; Attendance: 36,711; Referee: Dermot Gallagher

17 January 1999 22	Charlton Athletic	2–2	Newcastle United	London
	Bright 64'; Pringle 90'		Ketsbaia 13'; Solano 55'; Dabizas (yellow card) 77' (red card)	Stadium: The Valley; Attendance: 20,043; Referee: Peter Jones

30 January 1999 23	Newcastle United	2–1	Aston Villa	Newcastle upon Tyne
	Shearer 4'; Ketsbaia 27'		Merson 61'	Stadium: St James' Park; Attendance: 36,766; Referee: R. Harris

6 February 1999 24	Leeds United	0–1	Newcastle United	Leeds
			Solano 63'	Stadium: Elland Road; Attendance: 40,202; Referee: Uriah Rennie

17 February 1999 25	Newcastle United	4–1	Coventry City	Newcastle upon Tyne
	Shearer 19', 75'; Speed 55'; Saha 58'		Whelan 18'	Stadium: St James' Park; Attendance: 36,352; Referee: Steve Dunn

20 February 1999 26	Southampton	2–1	Newcastle United	Southampton
	Beattie 12'; Dodd 43' (pen.)		Hamann 86'	Stadium: The Dell; Attendance: 15,244; Referee: Graham Poll

28 February 1999 27	Newcastle United	1–1	Arsenal	Newcastle upon Tyne
	Hamann 77'		Anelka 36'	Stadium: St James' Park; Attendance: 36,708; Referee: Mike Reed

10 March 1999 28	Nottingham Forest	1–2	Newcastle United	Nottingham
	Freedman 12'; Louis-Jean (yellow card) 50' (red card)		Shearer 45' (pen.); Hamann 77'	Stadium: City Ground; Attendance: 22,852; Referee: Jeff Winter

13 March 1999 29	Newcastle United	1–2	Manchester United	Newcastle upon Tyne
	Solano 16'		Cole 25', 51'	Stadium: St James' Park; Attendance: 36,500; Referee: David Elleray

20 March 1999 30	West Ham United	2–0	Newcastle United	London
	Di Canio 17'; Kitson 82'			Stadium: Upton Park; Attendance: 25,997; Referee: Paul Durkin

3 April 1999 31	Derby County	3–4	Newcastle United	Derby
	Burton 8'; Baiano 22' (pen.); Wanchope 90'		Speed 11', 14'; Ketsbaia 39'; Solano 60'	Stadium: Pride Park; Attendance: 32,039; Referee: Dermot Gallagher

5 April 1999 32	Newcastle United	1–1	Tottenham Hotspur	Newcastle upon Tyne
	Ketsbaia 78'		Anderton 50' (pen.)	Stadium: St James' Park; Attendance: 36,655; Referee: Mike Riley

17 April 1999 33	Newcastle United	1–3	Everton	Newcastle upon Tyne
15:00	Shearer 82' (pen.)		Campbell 1', 44'; Gemmill 88'	Stadium: St James' Park; Attendance: 36,775; Referee: Graham Poll

21 April 1999 34	Sheffield Wednesday	1–1	Newcastle United	Sheffield
	Scott 52'		Shearer 45' (pen.)	Stadium: Hillsborough; Attendance: 21,545; Referee: Paul Alcock

24 April 1999 35	Wimbledon	1–1	Newcastle United	London
	Hartson 24'		Shearer 18'	Stadium: Selhurst Park; Attendance: 21,172; Referee: Peter Jones

1 May 1999 36	Newcastle United	1–1	Middlesbrough	Newcastle upon Tyne
	Shearer 64' (pen.)		Mustoe 60'	Stadium: St James' Park; Attendance: 36,552; Referee: Mike Reed

8 May 1999 37	Leicester City	2–0	Newcastle United	Leicester
	Izzet 20'; Cottee 41'			Stadium: Filbert Street; Attendance: 21,125; Referee: Uriah Rennie

16 May 1999 38	Newcastle United	1–1	Blackburn Rovers	Newcastle upon Tyne
	Hamann 51'		Wilcox 37'	Stadium: St James' Park; Attendance: 36,623; Referee: Jeff Winter

=== UEFA Cup Winners' Cup ===
17 September 1998 Round 1 1st leg	Newcastle United	2–1	Partizan Belgrade	Newcastle upon Tyne
	Shearer 12'; Dabizas 71'	Report	Rašović 69' (pen.)	Stadium: St James' Park; Attendance: 26,599

1 October 1998 Round 1 2nd leg	Partizan Belgrade	1–0 (2a – 2 agg.)	Newcastle United	Belgrade
	Rašović 53' (pen.)	Report		Stadium: Stadion FK Partizan; Attendance: 26,000

=== FA Cup ===
2 January 1999 Round 3	Newcastle United	2–1	Crystal Palace	Newcastle upon Tyne
15:00	Given (red card) 14'; Speed 48'; Shearer 69'	(Report)	Bradbury 18'	Stadium: St James' Park; Attendance: 36,536; Referee: M. Reed

23 January 1999 Round 4	Newcastle United	3–0	Bradford City	Newcastle upon Tyne
15:00	Hamann 33'; Shearer 52'; Ketsbaia 86'	(Report)		Stadium: St James' Park; Attendance: 36,698; Referee: Paul Durkin

14 February 1999 Round 5	Newcastle United	0–0	Blackburn Rovers	Newcastle upon Tyne
16:00		(Report)		Stadium: St James' Park; Attendance: 36,295; Referee: Dermot Gallagher

24 February 1999 Round 5R	Blackburn Rovers	0–1	Newcastle United	Blackburn
19:45		(Report)	Saha 28'	Stadium: Ewood Park; Attendance: 27,483; Referee: Dermot Gallagher

7 March 1999 Round 6	Newcastle United	4–1	Everton	Newcastle upon Tyne
16:00	Ketsbaia 21', 73'; Georgiadis 61'; Shearer 81'	(Report)	Unsworth 57'	Stadium: St James' Park; Attendance: 36,584; Referee: Graham Barber

11 April 1999 Semi-final	Newcastle United	2–0 (a.e.t.)	Tottenham Hotspur	Manchester
15:00	Shearer 109' (pen.), 118'	(Report)		Stadium: Old Trafford; Attendance: 53,609; Referee: Paul Durkin

22 May 1999 Final	Manchester United	2–0	Newcastle United	London
15:00	Sheringham 11'; Scholes 53'	(Report)		Stadium: Wembley; Attendance: 79,101; Referee: Peter Jones

=== League Cup ===
27 October 1998 Round 3	Tranmere Rovers	0–1	Newcastle United	Tranmere
19:45		Report	Dalglish 31'	Stadium: Prenton Park; Attendance: 12,017; Referee: Steve Dunn

11 November 1998 Round 4	Newcastle United	1–1 (a.e.t.) (2–4 p)	Blackburn Rovers	Newcastle
	Shearer 9'	Report	Sherwood 30'	Stadium: St. James Park; Attendance: 34,702; Referee: Neale Barry
	Penalties
	Penalty scored		Penalty scored
