= Russell Hoult =

English footballer (born 1972)

Personal information
- Full name: Russell Hoult
- Date of birth: 22 November 1972 (age 53)
- Place of birth: Ashby-de-la-Zouch, England
- Height: 6 ft 3 in (1.91 m)
- Position: Goalkeeper

Youth career
- –1991: Leicester City

Senior career*
Years	Team	Apps	(Gls)
1991–1995	Leicester City	10	(0)
1991	→ Lincoln City (loan)	2	(0)
1992	→ Blackpool (loan)	0	(0)
1992	→ Cheltenham Town (loan)	3	(0)
1993	→ Kettering Town (loan)	7	(0)
1993–1994	→ Bolton Wanderers (loan)	4	(0)
1994	→ Lincoln City (loan)	15	(0)
1995	→ Derby County (loan)	15	(0)
1995–2000	Derby County	108	(0)
2000	→ Portsmouth (loan)	10	(0)
2000–2001	Portsmouth	30	(0)
2001–2007	West Bromwich Albion	190	(0)
2005	→ Nottingham Forest (loan)	8	(0)
2007–2008	Stoke City	1	(0)
2008	→ Notts County (loan)	2	(0)
2008	→ Notts County (loan)	12	(0)
2008–2010	Notts County	20	(0)
2009	→ Darlington (loan)	6	(0)
2011–2012	Hereford United	2	(0)
2012–2013	Thringstone Miners Welfare		
Total		445	(0)

Managerial career
- 2012–2013: Thringstone Miners Welfare
- * Club domestic league appearances and goals

Russell Hoult (born 22 November 1972) is an English football coach and former professional player who played as a goalkeeper.

He notably spent time playing in the Premier League and played for Leicester City, Derby County and West Bromwich Albion. He also played in the Football League for Lincoln City, Blackpool, Bolton Wanderers, Portsmouth, Nottingham Forest, Stoke City, Notts County, Darlington and Hereford United.

Following the end of his playing career, Hoult moved into coaching and has worked for Hereford United as a goalkeeping coach, before a spell as club president and manager of Thringstone Miners Welfare.

== Playing career ==
Hoult began his career at Leicester City, where he was usually a reserve. During his time at the club he was sent on loan to Lincoln City twice, Kettering Town, Blackpool, where he did not make a first team appearance, Cheltenham Town, when they were playing non-league football, and Bolton Wanderers.

He signed for Derby County in the summer of 1995, joining for a fee of £200,000. He went on to help them win promotion to the Premiership in 1996. Hoult remained with the club until January 2000, when he was loaned to Portsmouth. This transfer was made permanent two months later and he remained with the club until the following January, when he left to join West Bromwich Albion for £450,000.

Hoult played a key role in helping West Brom win promotion to the Premiership in 2001–02, keeping a club record number of clean sheets and being named in the PFA Division One team of the year. On 15 September 2001, in a game against Watford, he saved a last minute Marcus Gayle penalty to preserve West Brom's 2–1 lead. He was a regular for Albion in the Premiership and was watched by England manager Sven-Göran Eriksson, but never made it into the national squad. A highlight of Hoult's 2002–03 season was saving a Dion Dublin penalty to help his side secure a 0–0 draw away at Aston Villa. Following Albion's relegation, Hoult remained a fixture in the side for the following season, as the club were promoted to the Premiership at the first attempt. In 2004, he was named as one of West Bromwich Albion's 16 greatest players, in a poll organised as part of the club's 125th anniversary celebrations. He played for the majority of the 2004–05 season, as West Bromwich Albion escaped relegation. However, after being a regular in goal for West Brom for several seasons, Hoult lost his place at the start of the 2005–06 season due to a groin injury. Second choice to Chris Kirkland, who manager Bryan Robson had signed on a 12-month loan from Liverpool, Hoult was loaned to Nottingham Forest in September 2005. However, he was recalled during his second month with the club after Kirkland sustained a rib injury.

Following the club's relegation and Kirkland's return to Liverpool, goalkeeping duties for the 2006–07 season were shared between Hoult and new signing Pascal Zuberbühler, until reports about his personal life surfaced in national newspapers. On 31 January 2007, after making 190 appearances for the club, Hoult was transferred to Stoke City on a free transfer after being sacked by West Brom. He made his Stoke City debut on 14 August 2007 in a League Cup match away at Rochdale that finished 2–2 after extra time. He was unable to prevent Rochdale from progressing 4–2 on penalties, despite saving one of the spot-kicks. Hoult received a red card on his league debut for Stoke, in a match against Plymouth Argyle in December 2007.

In February 2008 Hoult joined Notts County on loan until the end of the season, following an injury to regular keeper Kevin Pilkington. He kept a clean sheet in the 0–0 draw away at Peterborough United in March, making the League Two Team of the Week. He made 14 appearances for the club, keeping seven clean sheets and helping the club to avoid relegation. He was released at the end of the 2007–08 season, following Stoke's promotion to the Premiership. On 1 July 2008, Hoult returned to Notts County on a permanent basis, signing a two-year contract with the club. He played the first three games of the 2009–10 season for Notts County, before being replaced by new signing Kasper Schmeichel for the home game against Dagenham & Redbridge. On 16 September 2009, Darlington manager Colin Todd signed Hoult on loan for a month as Todd felt that permanent Quakers keeper David Knight needed a break after a tough start to the season. Todd was sacked during Hoult's loan and he was recalled by Notts County at the end of his month spell. He had played five games for Darlington. On 10 May 2010, it was announced that he had been released by Notts County along with seven other players.

== Coaching career ==
Hoult signed on as goalkeeping coach at Hereford United on Thursday 26 August. In October 2010 he became assistant manager to Jamie Pitman after the sacking of Simon Davey. On 25 February 2011, he registered as a player for Hereford United in order to provide goalkeeping back up. In March 2012, Hoult signed for Thringstone Miners Welfare as both player/manager and club president.

== Personal life ==
Hoult, a married man, has on a number of occasions been the subject of public revelations concerning his sexual conduct. In 2000, he was fined £300 for kerb crawling. He was also cleared of sending indecent letters to a 15-year-old girl after his lawyer told magistrates that they were no worse than "saucy seaside postcards". In January 2007 he was suspended by West Bromwich Albion after footage of him involved in an orgy was leaked onto the Internet allegedly with him wearing a club polo shirt.

Hoult was diagnosed with primary sclerosing cholangitis in 2023, and stage four bile duct cancer in 2024. By 2025, both illnesses had become terminal, leading to Hoult being put on palliative care.

== Career statistics ==
Appearances and goals by club, season and competition
Club	Season	League			FA Cup		League Cup		Other (Note: Appearances and goals in the Anglo-Italian Cup, Football League Trophy and Football League play-offs)		Total	
Club	Season	Division	Apps	Goals	Apps	Goals	Apps	Goals	Apps	Goals	Apps	Goals
Leicester City	1991–92	Second Division	0	0	0	0	0	0	1	0	1	0
Leicester City	1992–93	First Division	10	0	0	0	3	0	1	0	14	0
Leicester City	1993–94	First Division	0	0	0	0	0	0	0	0	0	0
Leicester City	Total		10	0	0	0	3	0	1	0	14	0
Lincoln City (loan)	1991–92	Fourth Division	2	0	0	0	1	0	0	0	3	0
Bolton Wanderers (loan)	1993–94	First Division	4	0	0	0	0	0	1	0	5	0
Lincoln City (loan)	1994–95	Third Division	15	0	0	0	0	0	1	0	16	0
Derby County	1994–95	First Division	15	0	0	0	0	0	0	0	15	0
Derby County	1995–96	First Division	41	0	1	0	2	0	0	0	44	0
Derby County	1996–97	Premier League	32	0	3	0	2	0	0	0	37	0
Derby County	1997–98	Premier League	2	0	0	0	1	0	0	0	3	0
Derby County	1998–99	Premier League	23	0	3	0	0	0	0	0	26	0
Derby County	1999–2000	Premier League	10	0	0	0	3	0	0	0	13	0
Derby County	Total		123	0	7	0	8	0	0	0	138	0
Portsmouth	1999–2000	First Division	18	0	0	0	0	0	0	0	18	0
Portsmouth	2000–01	First Division	22	0	0	0	4	0	0	0	26	0
Portsmouth	Total		40	0	0	0	4	0	0	0	44	0
West Bromwich Albion	2000–01	First Division	13	0	0	0	0	0	2	0	15	0
West Bromwich Albion	2001–02	First Division	45	0	4	0	3	0	0	0	52	0
West Bromwich Albion	2002–03	Premier League	37	0	2	0	0	0	0	0	39	0
West Bromwich Albion	2003–04	First Division	44	0	1	0	5	0	0	0	50	0
West Bromwich Albion	2004–05	Premier League	36	0	3	0	0	0	0	0	39	0
West Bromwich Albion	2005–06	Premier League	1	0	0	0	1	0	0	0	2	0
West Bromwich Albion	2006–07	Championship	14	0	1	0	1	0	0	0	16	0
West Bromwich Albion	Total		190	0	11	0	10	0	2	0	213	0
Nottingham Forest (loan)	2005–06	League One	8	0	0	0	0	0	0	0	8	0
Stoke City	2007–08	Championship	1	0	0	0	1	0	0	0	2	0
Notts County	2007–08	League Two	14	0	0	0	0	0	0	0	14	0
Notts County	2008–09	League Two	16	0	3	0	1	0	1	0	21	0
Notts County	2009–10	League Two	4	0	1	0	1	0	0	0	6	0
Notts County	Total		34	0	4	0	2	0	1	0	41	0
Darlington (loan)	2009–10	League Two	6	0	0	0	0	0	0	0	6	0
Hereford United	2010–11	League Two	2	0	0	0	0	0	0	0	2	0
Career total			435	0	22	0	29	0	6	0	492	0

== Honours ==
Individual

- PFA Team of the Year: 2001–02 First Division
