= Keidel =

Keidel is a German surname. Notable people with the surname include:

- Ralf Keidel (born 1977), German football player and coach
- Wilhelm Victor Keidel (1825–1870), American physician from Texas
