= Peter Keen =

Peter Keen may refer to:

- Peter Keen (footballer) (born 1976), English footballer
- Peter Keen (cyclist) (born 1964), British cyclist, coach, and performance director
