= Shay Given =

Irish association football player (born 1976)

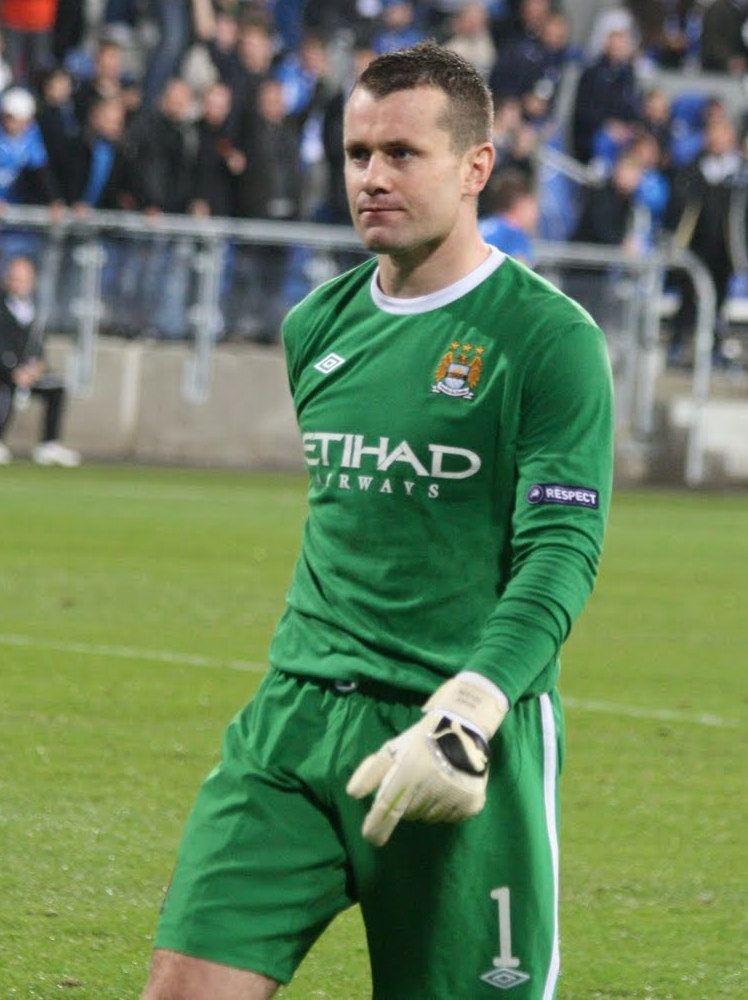
- Given playing for Manchester City in 2010

Personal information
- Full name: Shay John James Given
- Date of birth: 20 April 1976 (age 50)
- Place of birth: Lifford, County Donegal, Ireland
- Height: 1.85 m (6 ft 1 in)
- Position: Goalkeeper

Youth career
- Lifford Celtic
- 1991–1994: Celtic

Senior career*
Years	Team	Apps	(Gls)
1994–1997	Blackburn Rovers	2	(0)
1994	→ Swindon Town (loan)	0	(0)
1996	→ Swindon Town (loan)	5	(0)
1996	→ Sunderland (loan)	17	(0)
1997–2009	Newcastle United	354	(0)
2009–2011	Manchester City	50	(0)
2011–2015	Aston Villa	37	(0)
2013–2014	→ Middlesbrough (loan)	16	(0)
2015–2017	Stoke City	8	(0)
Total		489	(0)

International career
	Republic of Ireland U21	5	(0)
1996–2016	Republic of Ireland	134	(0)

Managerial career
- 2020: Derby County (co-interim)
- * Club domestic league appearances and goals

Shay John James Given (born 20 April 1976) is an Irish former professional footballer who played as a goalkeeper. Widely regarded as one of Ireland's greatest ever players and – in his prime – one of the Premier League's best goalkeepers, he is the second-most capped Republic of Ireland player, with 134 caps (a tally exceeded only by Robbie Keane).

Given began his career at Celtic; however, he never made a first-team appearance and joined Blackburn Rovers on a free transfer in 1994. Whilst on loan from Blackburn, he was part of both the Sunderland team who won the Football League First Division title in 1995–96 and the Swindon Town team who won the Football League Second Division title that same season. He was signed by Newcastle United in 1997 for a fee of £2.5 million, where he was part of the teams who were runners-up in the 1998 and 1999 FA Cup campaigns, and was named in the Premier League Team of the Season for the 2001–02 and 2005–06 seasons. He played in the UEFA Champions League and UEFA Cup with Newcastle, and was involved in the club's title challenge in 2001–02. On 1 February 2009, Given joined Manchester City for £6 million on a four-and-a-half-year contract. On 18 July 2011, he joined Aston Villa for a fee believed to have been around £3.5 million, signing a five-year contract. Given joined Stoke City in July 2015, remaining with the club for two seasons before retiring.

Having surpassed the total of 100 caps required for membership, he is part of the FIFA Century Club. Given gained his first international cap in 1996 and played in goal during every match for his country during the 2002 FIFA World Cup campaign, helping them reach the knockout stage. He was later on the pitch in Paris when the Republic of Ireland were knocked out of the play-offs for a spot in the 2010 FIFA World Cup by France before helping his team qualify for UEFA Euro 2012. Given played at UEFA Euro 2012 and was selected in Martin O'Neill's 23-man squad for UEFA Euro 2016, but did not appear in any of Ireland's four matches at the tournament. He announced his international retirement in July 2016, having amassed 134 caps for his country and kept 52 clean sheets.

== Club career ==
=== Early career ===
Born in Lifford, County Donegal, Given's footballing career began at local amateur side Lifford Celtic, where he shot to notoriety for conceding seven goals on his debut. He was propelled into the limelight when he played in an FAI Junior Cup semi-final for Lifford Celtic. At 14, his performances for the club attracted attention from Scottish club Celtic, and he was invited to train with their youth side during a pre-season tour of Ireland in 1991. Given signed for the club a year later. Despite being named to the substitutes bench for the Old Firm derby against Rangers on 1 January 1994, Given never made a first-team appearance.

His performances for Celtic's youth team did bring him to the attention of Blackburn Rovers manager Kenny Dalglish, and he signed for the English side on a free transfer in the summer of 1994. Given revealed that Celtic offered him a one-year contract to stay at the club before moving to Blackburn Rovers.

=== Blackburn Rovers ===
The season after Given's arrival saw Blackburn win the Premier League title and Given was unable to oust first-choice goalkeeper and England international Tim Flowers from the team. He made two loan moves to Swindon Town. Given acted as understudy during his first spell at the Wiltshire club, but helped them start their Championship-winning Second Division campaign during the 1995–96 season. He played in five games for Swindon before returning to Blackburn at the end of 1995. Given suffered an arm injury shortly after returning to Blackburn, but it turned out that the injury was "not as bad as first feared".

Given was sent on loan again in January 1996, this time to First Division side Sunderland. Given kept 12 clean sheets during his 17 games for the club, and formed part of the team who won promotion to the Premier League as champions.

Ahead of the 1996–97 season, Given was linked a move away from Blackburn, with Sunderland trying to re-sign him permanently. However, he stayed at the club throughout the summer transfer window, with manager Ray Harford intended to keep him and told him to challenge Flowers for the first-choice goalkeeper role. Blackburn even offered Given a new three-year contract to stay at the club. However, Given continued to be Blackburn's second-choice goalkeeper behind Flowers. He made his debut for the club on 24 September 1996, coming on as an 86th minute substitute in Blackburn's 2–0 win against Brentford in the second leg of the League Cup second round. Following an injury to Flowers, Given made his Premier League debut in Blackburn's 1–0 defeat at Wimbledon on 14 December 1996. He then kept his first Premier League clean sheet in a 0–0 draw against Derby County on 28 December. It was later revealed that Given did not sign the contract offered to him and intended to leave at the end of the 1996–97 season due to a lack of first team football. This led him to put a transfer request, even it was unlikely to leave the club in the January transfer window.

His performances on loan impressed Kenny Dalglish, who had recently been appointed manager of Newcastle United, and prompted him to sign Given again. But the Magpies faced competitions from Sunderland, Celtic, and Liverpool. Given signed for the North-East club in the summer of 1997 for a fee of £1.5 million following an independent tribunal, as Given was under the age of 23 at the time.

=== Newcastle United ===
==== 1997–2001 ====
Given was one of the first signings of then-newly appointed manager Dalglish. Given made his debut in Newcastle's 2–1 home victory over Sheffield Wednesday on 9 August 1997 and immediately established himself in the first team, beating fellow goalkeepers Pavel Srníček, Shaka Hislop and Steve Harper to the position. Newcastle advanced to the final of the FA Cup, and Given played the whole match as the team were defeated 2–0 by league champions Arsenal. The club also progressed to the final the following year, but Given was replaced by Harper as Newcastle lost 2–0 in the final, this time to Manchester United.

In November 1997, Given conceded a strange goal against Coventry City when, after collecting a cross, he rolled the ball out in preparation to make a long clearance. However, he had forgotten that Coventry striker Dion Dublin was still behind him, and Dublin quickly took advantage of the situation by rolling the ball into the empty net. The coincidence of the goalscorer's name quickly led to the popular joke among football fans that Given "is the only Irishman who doesn't know where Dublin is" and the goal itself is still regularly featured on lists compiled of bizarre goals.

Given submitted a written transfer request in December 2000 after failing to regain his place in the first team from Harper after a thigh injury had ruled him out of a match against Leeds United. Manager Bobby Robson stated at the time: "A lot of clubs have a very good goalkeeper and one who stands by. I think we have two keepers — and Harper is proving that — who can play in the Premiership". The club rejected Given's request and he later withdrew it, stating that his "intention was simply to express [his] frustration at being left out of the team," and that he "never had any intention of actually leaving the club." An injury to Harper led to Given being recalled to the first team, and he kept his place for the rest of the season.

==== 2001–2004 ====
In the 2001–02 season, Given played in every Premier League match as Newcastle's previously unexpected title challenge ended in a fourth-place finish in the league. A highlight of the season was Given saving a Fabrizio Ravanelli penalty in a 1–0 win over Derby County on 24 November 2001. Given was selected in the PFA Team of the Year and Newcastle's league position meant that they would enter the qualifying stages of the UEFA Champions League the following season.

The next season, Given again found himself competing with Harper. After a 5–0 qualifying round win, Newcastle progressed to the group stages of the Champions League. He played in the first three group matches, all of which Newcastle lost. Harper then replaced Given for the next two games. Given returned for the final group match against Feyenoord in the Netherlands, and Newcastle's 3–2 win meant that they qualified for the second round. Internazionale scored four times past Given as Newcastle lost 4–1 in their opening match in the second group stage. Newcastle conceded a further three times away to Barcelona, beat Bayer Leverkusen at home and in Germany (with Given saving an Oliver Neuville penalty in the home tie), and drew with Inter at the San Siro, however a 2–0 loss at home against Barcelona meant that the club finished third in their group and failed to qualify for the knockout stages. Given played every game in the second round. Given played all 38 league games for the club, as well as his twelve European appearances, as the team finished in third place in the Premier League, meaning the club would enter the Champions League qualifying round in the 2003–04 season.

Having finished third in the league in May 2003, Given and Newcastle lost 4–3 on penalties to Partizan Belgrade early in the 2003–04 season, meaning that Newcastle failed to reach the group stages of the Champions League. The club instead qualified for the UEFA Cup, where they reached the semi-finals. A fifth-place finish in the league meant that the club qualified for the following season's UEFA Cup competition. Given played in every one of the club's league matches for a third successive season, as well as all thirteen European games.

==== 2004–2006 ====
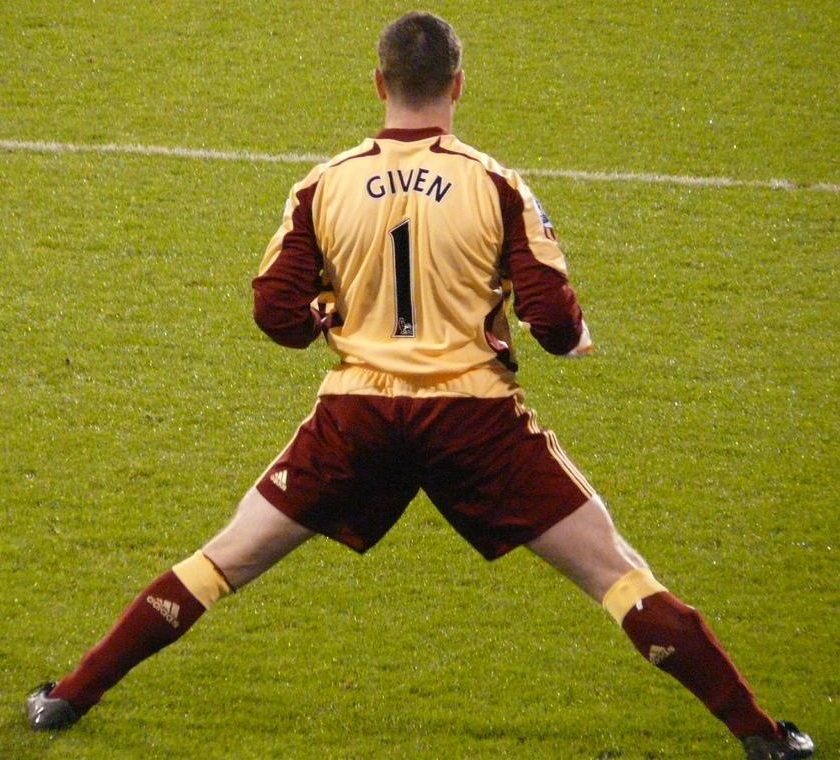
Given stretching during a Newcastle match in 2007

After a poor start to the 2004–05 season, Graeme Souness replaced Bobby Robson as Newcastle manager. Given overtook Alan Shearer as having played in the most European matches for the club on 16 September 2004 in a game against Bnei Sakhnin, and Given's twelve European and three FA Cup appearances helped Newcastle reach the UEFA Cup quarter-final and the FA Cup semi-final. Given missed two Premier League games as the club finished in 14th place.

Although the club entered the Intertoto Cup in the 2005–06 season, a defeat by Spanish club Deportivo de La Coruña meant that they did not qualify for further European competition that season. Given played in all of the club's league matches as they finished in seventh position and he signed a new five-year contract with the club in the summer. His performances for Newcastle led to Given being named in the Premier League's Team of the Season. Given played in all of the club's FA Cup games as they reached the quarter-finals, and captained the team for three games during Shearer's absence.

On 17 September 2006, Given suffered a one-centimetre tear in his bowel after a tackle by West Ham United striker Marlon Harewood. Doctors likened the injury to one more likely to happen in a car crash. Manager Glenn Roeder signed ex-Newcastle veteran Pavel Srníček as cover for Steve Harper, and youth goalkeeper Tim Krul played a full match in Newcastle's 1–0 UEFA Cup win at Palermo on 2 November. Given returned on 18 November for Newcastle's 1–1 draw at Arsenal.

==== 2007–2009 ====
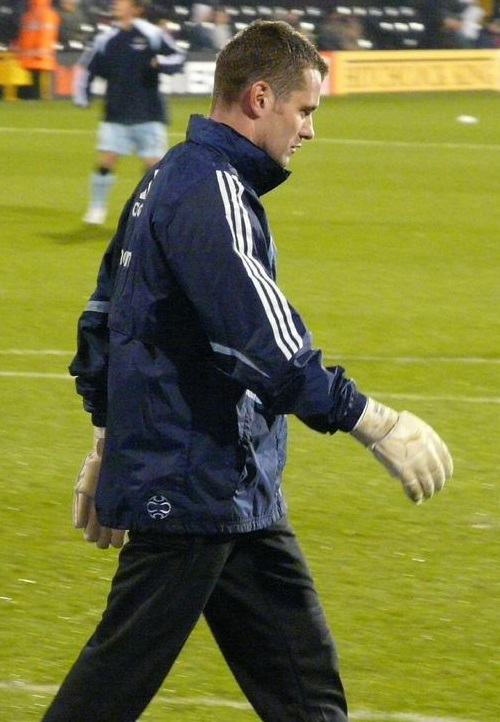
Given warming up for Newcastle in 2007

Given made his 400th appearance for the club on 1 January 2007 in a 2–2 draw against Manchester United. He ended the 2006–07 season with 22 league appearances as the club finished in 13th place, and reached the last 16 of the UEFA Cup.

Given's 2007–08 season was prematurely ended by injury in February 2008 when he had a re-occurrence of a previous groin injury in the 5–1 home defeat by Manchester United.

The opening months of Newcastle's 2008–09 season were blighted by ownership and managerial turmoil, as well as numerous injury problems. This manifested itself on the pitch as the club struggled to direct itself clear of the relegation zone. However, a highlight was Given saving a Kevin Nolan penalty in a 1–0 win over Bolton Wanderers. On 2 January 2009, following a 5–1 defeat at home against Liverpool, Given's lawyer released a statement saying that Given was "considering his future" at Newcastle, and requested permission to talk to representatives of Manchester City on 28 January after the club made a bid of £5 million which was subsequently rejected. Newcastle manager Joe Kinnear had already stated that the club was "not interested at all in selling him", and described the amount on offer for Given as "insulting". However, on 30 January, it was reported that Newcastle had given permission for Given to enter talks with Manchester City. After a transfer fee initially reported to be around £8 million was agreed between the clubs, Given signed for Manchester City on 1 February, with the transfer window set to close the following day. Although the fee for Given was expected to be around £8 million, in February 2009, Newcastle managing director Derek Llambias revealed at a supporters panel meeting that Given had been sold for an initial £5.9 million. Given was 34 games away from breaking Newcastle's appearance record held by Jimmy Lawrence.

=== Manchester City ===
On 1 February 2009, Given signed for Manchester City on a four-and-a-half-year contract for £6 million. He was formally introduced as a Manchester City player on 5 February 2009, and was assigned squad number 37. In the subsequent press conference, he criticised Newcastle's management for not trying hard enough to keep him at the club. He also said that "By coming here I thought I could be at a club that is challenging for honours. I didn't want to finish my career regretting not taking up this offer." Given kept a clean sheet in a man of the match performance in his debut, a 1–0 win against Middlesbrough on 7 February.

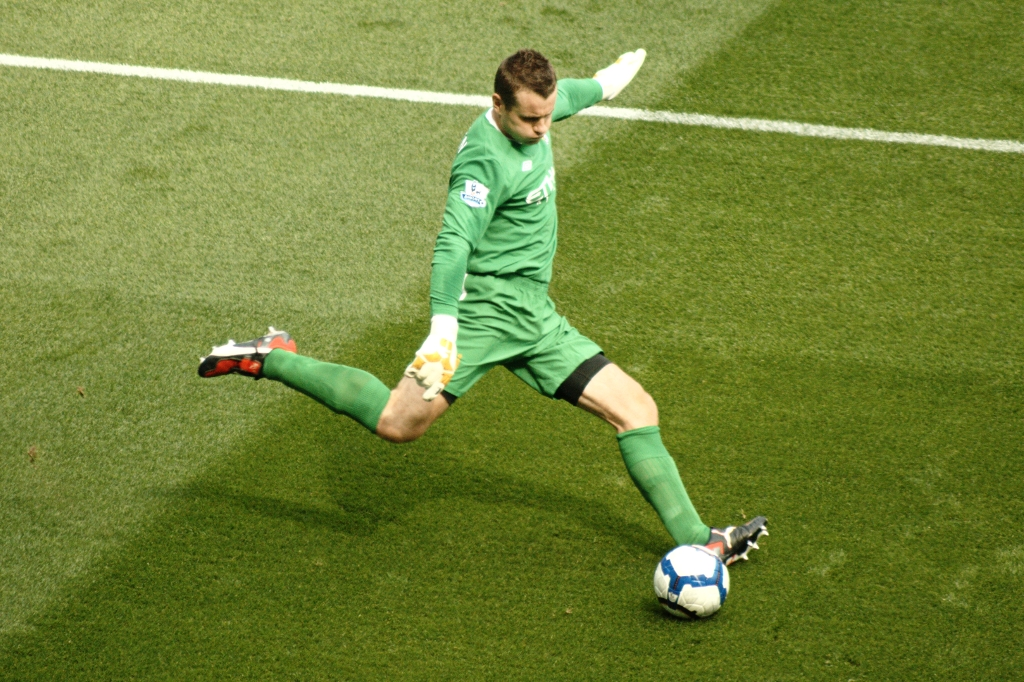
Given playing for Manchester City in 2009

With Joe Hart leaving the club on loan, Given was given the squad number 1 for the 2009–10 season. He made his 400th league appearance on 5 October 2009 against Aston Villa. On 1 November 2009, he saved a James McFadden penalty to help his side draw 0–0 at Birmingham City. On 5 December 2009, he made an outstanding penalty save from Frank Lampard to deny Chelsea an equalising goal. City went on to win 2–1. The same month, Daily Telegraph football correspondent Henry Winter named Given as "Premier League Goalkeeper of the Noughties". While team captain Kolo Touré was on international duty, Given was given the captain's armband by manager Roberto Mancini, who described him as "one of the five best goalkeepers in the world". He dislocated his shoulder during a match against Arsenal on 24 April, ruling him out for the rest of the season.

On 14 August 2010, Given was dropped from the Manchester City starting eleven for their opening league game against Tottenham Hotspur and replaced by Hart, who became City's permanent first choice goalkeeper. Given's only domestic appearance during the 2010–11 season came in a defeat to West Bromwich Albion in the League Cup; he also played in three Europa League matches.

=== Aston Villa ===
On 18 July 2011, Given joined Aston Villa for a fee believed to be around £3.5 million. He signed a five-year deal, meaning that he would be 40 when his contract expired. Given made his Villa debut in a pre-season friendly victory over Walsall on 21 July. He was substituted at half time for Andy Marshall, when the score was 2–0 to Villa. On 13 August 2011, Given played his first Premier League match for Aston Villa against Fulham in a 0–0 draw. In September 2011, Given was reunited with Terry Gennoe at Aston Villa. After four years out of the game, Gennoe was named as the new first team goalkeeping coach, replacing Rafa González. He had previously coached Given at Blackburn and Newcastle. On 3 December, Given suffered a torn hamstring, which sidelined him until January.

After a disappointing start to the 2012–13 season, Given lost his first team place to Brad Guzan after two league games. However, on 5 January 2013, he appeared in a 2–1 home win against Ipswich Town in an FA Cup third round match. Three days later, Given also played for Villa in a 3–1 away defeat against Bradford City in the first leg of the League Cup semi-final match. Despite winning the second leg 2–1, Villa were eliminated from the competition.

On 15 April 2014, Given was appointed temporary assistant to Paul Lambert after the club suspended Ian Culverhouse and Gary Karsa, pending an internal investigation for an undisclosed reason. Given played in all of Aston Villa's FA Cup fixtures that led to an appearance in the 2015 FA Cup final at the age of 39, which Villa lost 4–0 to Arsenal. The Cup run began with a 1–0 victory over Blackpool, and continued with 2–1 victories over both AFC Bournemouth and Leicester City, and a 2–0 win over derby rivals West Bromwich Albion. In the semi-final, Villa came from a goal down to defeat Liverpool 2–1, putting the club in their first FA Cup final since 2000.

==== Loan to Middlesbrough ====
Given joined Middlesbrough on a one-month loan deal on 28 November 2013 as cover for the injured Jason Steele. Given's initial one-month loan deal was extended to the end of February 2014 and ultimately, he made his last appearance for Middlesbrough on 22 February in a 0–0 draw against Leeds United. Whilst at Middlesbrough, Given kept ten clean sheets in 16 league games.

=== Stoke City ===
Given signed a two-year contract with Stoke City on 10 July 2015. Given joined as backup to first choice goalkeeper Jack Butland. He made his debut on 25 August 2015 in a 1–1 draw with Luton Town in the League Cup, Stoke winning on penalties. He missed most of Stoke's 2015–16 campaign after needing to undergo knee surgery in October 2015. Given returned towards the end of the campaign, and due to injury to Butland, he shared goalkeeping duties with Jakob Haugaard.

Given began the 2016–17 season as first-choice due to an injury to Butland. On 27 August 2016, he conceded an own goal in a 1–0 away defeat to Everton. Given had palmed a Leighton Baines penalty onto the post but the ball rebounded against his head and went over the line. After conceding four goals against Tottenham Hotspur and Crystal Palace in September, Given lost his place in the side to Lee Grant. He was released by Stoke at the end of the 2016–17 season.

On 21 April 2018, the day after his 42nd birthday, Given announced his retirement from professional football whilst receiving an award for Donegal Person of the Year in Dublin.

== International career ==
Given represented the Republic of Ireland at youth level before earning five caps for the Republic of Ireland national under-21 team. Although he did not become a regular first team player for Blackburn, Given's performances while on loan at Swindon and Sunderland led to him being called up to the Republic of Ireland squad in 1996. He made his debut for the national team on 27 March 1996, in a game against Russia. Due to his lack of playing time at Blackburn Rovers in the 1996–97 season, manager Mick McCarthy dropped him from the squad.

Although Ireland failed to qualify for the 1998 FIFA World Cup or UEFA Euro 2000, Given established himself as first-choice goalkeeper. He played in all of his nation's games at the 2002 FIFA World Cup. With draws against Cameroon and Germany and a 3–0 win against Saudi Arabia, the team reached the second round of the competition. Meeting Spain in the knockout round, Ireland forced penalties with the score at 1–1 at the end of extra time. Three missed penalties for Ireland ended their participation in the tournament, and Spain progressed to the next round.

Given was part of the team for most of the 2006 FIFA World Cup qualifying campaign; however, a draw with Switzerland meant that Ireland failed to qualify for the finals of the competition in Germany. He equalled Packie Bonner's record of 80 caps against Slovakia on 28 March 2007. Given obtained his 100th cap against Montenegro at Croke Park, Dublin, on 14 October 2009 in a 2010 FIFA World Cup qualifying game. Ireland reached a qualifying play-off against France, but were controversially eliminated by a goal scored after Thierry Henry handled the ball.

Given was part of the team that secured qualification for UEFA Euro 2012 with a play-off victory against Estonia. Given played in the Euro 2012 championship as Ireland were eliminated in the group stage.

=== Retirement, comeback and second retirement ===
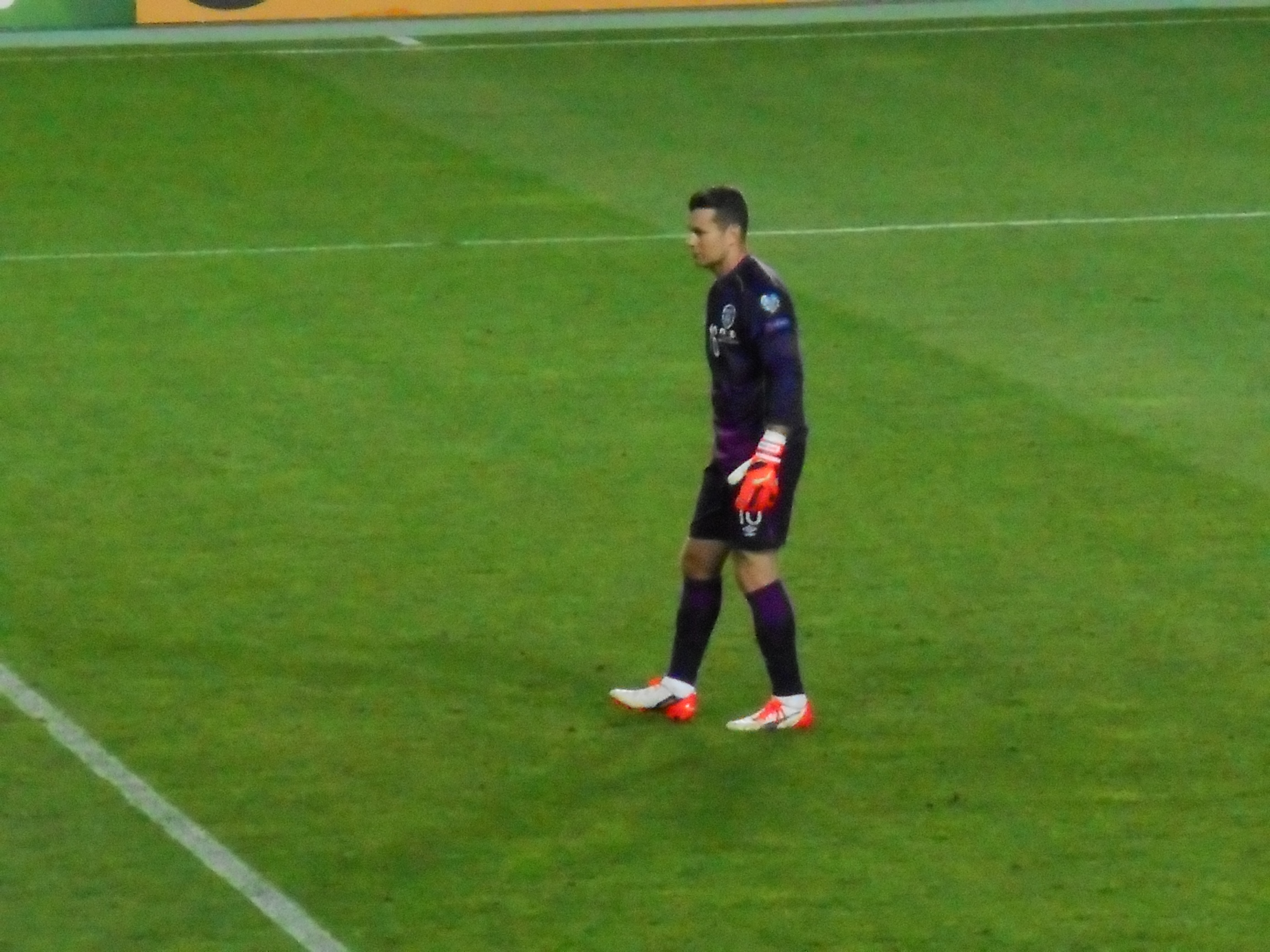
Given playing for Ireland on 4 September 2015 against Gibraltar

On 13 August 2012, Given announced on Twitter his decision to retire from international football, describing it as an "unforgettable experience" to play for his country. Given retired holding the record for the most capped Irishman, though Robbie Keane was closing in on the record.

Due to Given's lack of playing time with his club Aston Villa, there was speculation that he would make himself available for selection as part of Ireland's 2014 FIFA World Cup qualification campaign. On 14 January 2013, it was announced that Given was once again available for international selection.

On 30 August 2014, still not having played a league game with Aston Villa, three games into the 2014–15 Premier League season, he was selected by Martin O'Neill in his 27-man squad for a friendly against Oman and Ireland's first Euro 2016 qualifier in Georgia. It came after a two-year international absence, after retiring following the disappointing Euro 2012, where Ireland failed to progress from the group stages. He was one of four goalkeepers in the squad. On 2 September 2014, Given made his first start for Ireland since the Euros in a 2–0 win against Oman. However, he did not start against Georgia in O'Neill's first competitive game with David Forde getting the nod. Ireland won 2–1 in Tbilisi thanks to an Aiden McGeady brace. On 18 November 2014, Given started the 4–1 win against the United States in Dublin.

On 29 March 2015, Given regained his place in the starting line-up for the crucial Euro 2016 qualifier against Poland. The game finished 1–1 with Shane Long scoring a last minute equaliser. On 8 October 2015, Given suffered a knee injury and had to be stretchered off after 44 minutes against the 2014 FIFA World Cup winners Germany in what turned out to be a memorable night for Ireland as they prevailed with a 1–0 win.

On 31 May 2016, Given became Ireland's longest-serving player after appearing in the 2–1 home defeat to Belarus. He eclipsed Johnny Giles' record of 19 years and 202 days and became the first Irishman to play for his country for 20 years or more. He was selected in the 23-man Ireland squad for Euro 2016 but did not feature in any match at the tournament.

On 28 July 2016, Given announced his retirement from international football for the second and final time. He gave all his international playing fees to charity.

== Style of play ==
Given was considered to be an athletic and courageous goalkeeper, with excellent reflexes, anticipation, shot stopping abilities, and a good command of his area, in spite of not being particularly tall. He had been accused in the media of not being particularly effective at dealing with crosses. He was also known for his consistency. He was considered to be one of the greatest goalkeepers in the Premier League in his prime, and has frequently been described as Ireland's best ever goalkeeper and one of the greatest players in Ireland's history.

== Coaching career ==
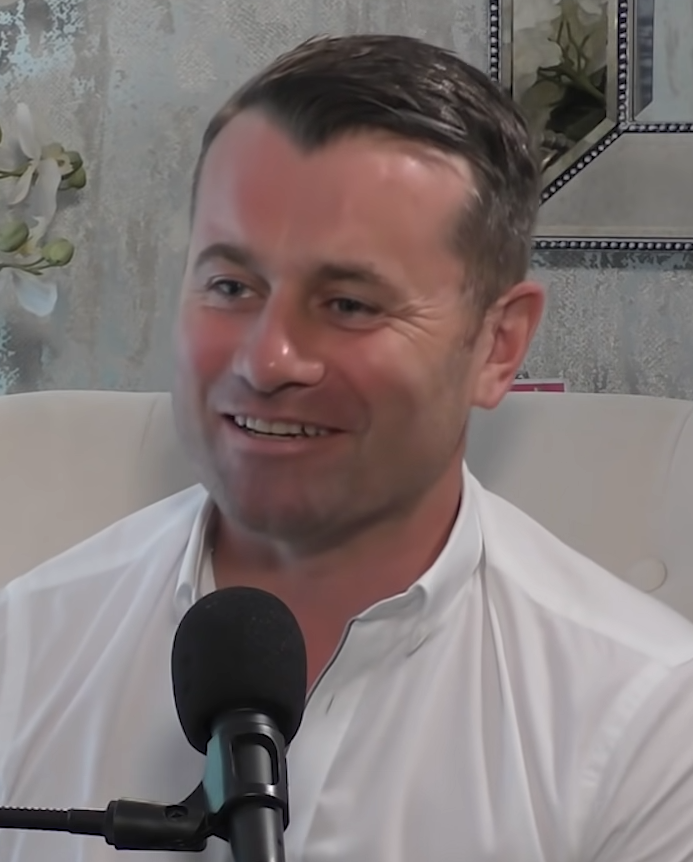
Given during an interview for the Anything Goes with James English podcast in October 2021

In June 2018, Given was appointed goalkeeping coach at Derby County under new manager Frank Lampard. He retained his position when Phillip Cocu was appointed manager in July 2019. In November 2020, Given was part of an interim coaching quartet alongside Wayne Rooney, Liam Rosenior and Justin Walker after Cocu was sacked earlier that month. After two matches as an interim quartet, Rooney would go on to take sole charge. On 15 January 2021, Rooney was appointed as the club's permanent manager and Given moved to the position of first-team coach. Given left his role at Derby at the end of the season because the club's financial problems meant they could not afford to renew it.

== Personal life ==
Shay married Jane Cunningham at a Catholic ceremony on 16 June 2001 in Hexham and received an Apostolic blessing for their wedding from Pope John Paul II. They were married until 2014, and the couple had two children. Given has been in a relationship with Rebecca Gibson since 2013, when Shay was still married. The couple have two daughters and married in October 2026. In 2006, Given was awarded the Freedom of County Donegal in a ceremony in his home town, Lifford.

Given with his wife Jane has helped to organise several fundraising events in aid of Macmillan Cancer Support. His mother died of cancer when he was four, so he has continually tried to raise money as it is an issue close to him. On 27 November 2011, Given was brought to tears during a minute's applause for former teammate and personal friend Gary Speed, following Speed's death earlier that day, before Aston Villa met Swansea City at the Liberty Stadium.

On 11 January 2026 Shay described Wilfried Nancy's short time as Celtic manager as an "absolute holocaust" live on BBC show Final Score which triggered an apology.

== Career statistics ==
=== Club ===
Appearances and goals by club, season and competition
Club	Season	League			FA Cup		League Cup		Europe		Total	
Club	Season	Division	Apps	Goals	Apps	Goals	Apps	Goals	Apps	Goals	Apps	Goals
Blackburn Rovers	1994–95	Premier League	0	0	0	0	1	0	—		1	0
Blackburn Rovers	1996–97	Premier League	2	0	0	0	0	0	—		2	0
Blackburn Rovers	Total		2	0	0	0	1	0	—		3	0
Swindon Town (loan)	1995–96	Second Division	5	0	0	0	0	0	—		5	0
Sunderland (loan)	1995–96	First Division	17	0	0	0	0	0	—		17	0
Newcastle United	1997–98	Premier League	24	0	4	0	0	0	6 (Note: Appearances in UEFA Champions League)	0	34	0
Newcastle United	1998–99	Premier League	31	0	6	0	2	0	1 (Note: Appearance in UEFA Cup Winners' Cup)	0	40	0
Newcastle United	1999–2000	Premier League	14	0	2	0	1	0	0	0	17	0
Newcastle United	2000–01	Premier League	34	0	0	0	1	0	—		35	0
Newcastle United	2001–02	Premier League	38	0	5	0	1	0	6 (Note: Appearances in UEFA Intertoto Cup)	0	50	0
Newcastle United	2002–03	Premier League	38	0	1	0	0	0	12	0	51	0
Newcastle United	2003–04	Premier League	38	0	2	0	0	0	13 (Note: Two appearances in UEFA Champions League, eleven appearances in UEFA Cup)	0	53	0
Newcastle United	2004–05	Premier League	36	0	3	0	1	0	12 (Note: Appearances in UEFA Cup)	0	52	0
Newcastle United	2005–06	Premier League	38	0	4	0	2	0	3	0	47	0
Newcastle United	2006–07	Premier League	22	0	2	0	1	0	8	0	33	0
Newcastle United	2007–08	Premier League	19	0	3	0	2	0	—		24	0
Newcastle United	2008–09	Premier League	22	0	2	0	2	0	—		26	0
Newcastle United	Total		354	0	34	0	13	0	61	0	462	0
Manchester City	2008–09	Premier League	15	0	0	0	0	0	6	0	21	0
Manchester City	2009–10	Premier League	35	0	3	0	6	0	—		44	0
Manchester City	2010–11	Premier League	0	0	0	0	1	0	3 (Note: Appearances in UEFA Europa League)	0	4	0
Manchester City	Total		50	0	3	0	7	0	9	0	69	0
Aston Villa	2011–12	Premier League	33	0	1	0	1	0	—		35	0
Aston Villa	2012–13	Premier League	2	0	2	0	5	0	—		9	0
Aston Villa	2013–14	Premier League	0	0	0	0	0	0	—		0	0
Aston Villa	2014–15	Premier League	2	0	6	0	2	0	—		10	0
Aston Villa	Total		37	0	9	0	7	0	—		53	0
Middlesbrough (loan)	2013–14	Championship	16	0	0	0	0	0	—		16	0
Stoke City	2015–16	Premier League	3	0	0	0	2	0	—		5	0
Stoke City	2016–17	Premier League	5	0	0	0	1	0	—		6	0
Stoke City	Total		8	0	0	0	3	0	—		11	0
Career total			489	0	46	0	31	0	70	0	636	0

=== International ===
Appearances and goals by national team and year
National team	Year	Apps	Goals
Republic of Ireland	1996	8	0
Republic of Ireland	1997	6	0
Republic of Ireland	1998	6	0
Republic of Ireland	1999	3	0
Republic of Ireland	2000	3	0
Republic of Ireland	2001	10	0
Republic of Ireland	2002	11	0
Republic of Ireland	2003	8	0
Republic of Ireland	2004	11	0
Republic of Ireland	2005	8	0
Republic of Ireland	2006	4	0
Republic of Ireland	2007	7	0
Republic of Ireland	2008	6	0
Republic of Ireland	2009	11	0
Republic of Ireland	2010	7	0
Republic of Ireland	2011	11	0
Republic of Ireland	2012	5	0
Republic of Ireland	2013	0	0
Republic of Ireland	2014	2	0
Republic of Ireland	2015	6	0
Republic of Ireland	2016	1	0
Total		134	0

== Honours ==
Sunderland

- Football League First Division: 1995–96

Newcastle United

- UEFA Intertoto Cup: 2006
- FA Cup runner-up: 1997–98, 1998–99

Manchester City

- FA Cup: 2010–11

Aston Villa

- FA Cup runner-up: 2014–15

Republic of Ireland

- Nations Cup: 2011

Individual

- PFA Team of the Year: 2001–02 Premier League, 2005–06 Premier League
- North-East FWA Player of the Year: 2002, 2006
- Newcastle United Player of the Year: 2004–05, 2005–06
- FAI Senior International Player of the Year: 2005, 2006

== See also ==
- List of men's footballers with 100 or more international caps
