= Philippe Albert =

Belgian footballer

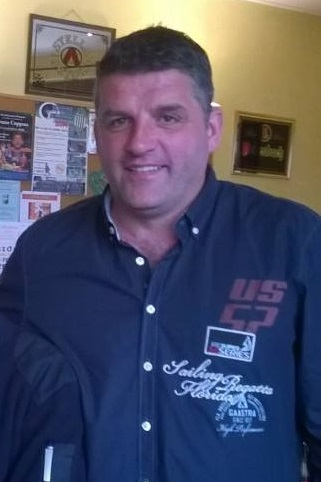
- Albert in 2014

Personal information
- Full name: Philippe Julien Albert
- Date of birth: 10 August 1967 (age 59)
- Place of birth: Bouillon, Belgium
- Height: 1.90 m (6 ft 3 in)
- Position: Defender

Senior career*
Years	Team	Apps	(Gls)
1986–1988	Charleroi	65	(7)
1988–1991	KV Mechelen	87	(5)
1991–1994	Anderlecht	50	(9)
1994–1999	Newcastle United	96	(8)
1998–1999	→ Fulham (loan)	13	(2)
1999–2000	Charleroi	14	(1)
Total		325	(32)

International career
1987–1989	Belgium U21	4	(0)
1987–1997	Belgium	41	(5)
- * Club domestic league appearances and goals

Philippe Julien Albert (born 10 August 1967) is a Belgian former professional footballer and television pundit.

As a player he was a defender. He played for Charleroi, KV Mechelen and Anderlecht in his native Belgium, and for English clubs Newcastle United and Fulham. It was at Newcastle that he became known as an attack-minded centre-back for his forward runs from defence in the team dubbed as "the Entertainers".

Albert made 41 appearances for the Belgium national team from 1987 to 1997, and represented his country at the 1990 and 1994 World Cups.

== Club career ==
Albert started his career with Charleroi before moving to KV Mechelen where his performances won him Belgian Golden Shoe and a move to Anderlecht. While playing at Anderlecht, he won the Belgian League twice and helped his national side qualify for the 1994 World Cup.

Albert's exploits at the World Cup earned him a £2.6 million transfer to Kevin Keegan's Newcastle United; he was issued the number 27 shirt, and completed the transfer on his 27th birthday. He later claimed he turned down moves to Italian clubs Juventus and Fiorentina the year before as he did not like the hot climate or having to play on Sundays, and moved to Newcastle as he was a fan of Keegan and the team he played for, Liverpool, in his youth. He was an immediate success in the side as he helped them win their first six league games of the 1994–95 season, but missed the later stages of the season through injury and Newcastle finished sixth – not even enough for a UEFA Cup place.

External videos
- Monday 20 October 1996: Phillipe Albert chips the keeper for the fifth goal

He became a cult hero at Newcastle United due to his less-than-defensive tendencies in "the Entertainers'" central defence, would often make runs forward and be found roaming on the edge of the opposition box. His most famous moment arguably came when he scored an audacious chip from 20 yards over Peter Schmeichel in a 5–0 win over Manchester United on 20 October 1996.

Fans at Newcastle created a terrace chant for the player, singing "Phillipe, Phillipe Albert, everyone knows his name" to the words of the theme song of 1970s children's TV series The Adventures of Rupert Bear.

Injuries towards the end of the decade limited his first-team chances and he spent 13 games on loan to third-tier club Fulham (managed at the time by his former Newcastle boss Keegan), scoring twice during the 1998–99 season as they were promoted from Division Two as champions.

On leaving Newcastle in 1999, Albert returned to Belgium, rejoining Charleroi for £600,000. He spent one season with the club before retiring from football.

== International career ==
Albert made 41 appearances for the Belgium national team, making his debut in 1987, but came to worldwide prominence at the 1994 FIFA World Cup. There he played in four of Belgium's matches, scoring against the Netherlands in his first game and against Germany in the second round match, which Belgium lost 3–2.

== Post-playing career ==
Albert is now working as a pundit for Belgian TV, and also runs a successful fruit and vegetable company.

== Career statistics ==
=== Club ===
Appearances and goals by club, season and competition
Club	Season	League		
Club	Season	Division	Apps	Goals
Royal Charleroi	1985–86	Belgian First Division	5	0
Royal Charleroi	1986–87	Belgian First Division	27	2
Royal Charleroi	1987–88	Belgian First Division	32	5
Royal Charleroi	1988–89	Belgian First Division	33	2
Royal Charleroi	Total		97	9
K.V. Mechelen	1989–90	Belgian First Division	22	0
K.V. Mechelen	1990–91	Belgian First Division	32	4
K.V. Mechelen	1991–92	Belgian First Division	33	2
K.V. Mechelen	Total		87	6
Anderlecht	1992–93	Belgian First Division	25	5
Anderlecht	1993–94	Belgian First Division	25	4
Anderlecht	Total		50	9
Newcastle United	1994–95	Premier League	17	2
Newcastle United	1995–96	Premier League	23	4
Newcastle United	1996–97	Premier League	27	2
Newcastle United	1997–98	Premier League	23	0
Newcastle United	1998–99	Premier League	6	0
Newcastle United	Total		96	8
Fulham	1998–99	Second Division	13	2
Royal Charleroi	1999–2000	Belgian First Division	13	1
Career total			356	35

=== National team ===
Appearances and goals by national team and year
National team	Year	Apps	Goals
Belgium	1987	1	0
Belgium	1988	1	0
Belgium	1989	3	0
Belgium	1990	4	0
Belgium	1991	6	0
Belgium	1992	7	2
Belgium	1993	5	1
Belgium	1994	9	2
Belgium	1995	0	0
Belgium	1996	3	0
Belgium	1997	2	0
Total		41	5

List of international goals scored by Philippe Albert
No.	Cap	Date	Venue	Opponent	Score	Result	Competition
1	17	25 March 1992	Parc des Princes, Paris, France	France	1–0	3–3	Friendly
2	19	3 June 1992	Svangaskarð, Toftir, Faroe Islands	Faroe Islands	1–0	3–0	1994 World Cup qualification
3	23	13 February 1993	Makario Stadium, Nicosia, Cyprus	Cyprus	3–0	3–0	1994 World Cup qualification
4	31	25 June 1994	Florida Citrus Bowl, Orlando, United States	Netherlands	1–0	1–0	1994 FIFA World Cup
5	33	2 July 1994	Soldier Field, Chicago, United States	Germany	2–3	2–3	1994 FIFA World Cup

== Honours ==
KV Mechelen

- Belgian First Division: 1988–89
- European Super Cup: 1988
- Amsterdam Tournament: 1989
- Joan Gamper Trophy: 1989
- Jules Pappaert Cup: 1990

Anderlecht

- Belgian First Division: 1990–91, 1992–93, 1993–94
- Belgian Cup: 1993–94
- Belgian Super Cup: 1993

Newcastle United

- FA Cup runner-up: 1997–98

Fulham

- Football League Second Division: 1998–99

Individual

- Belgian Professional Footballer of the Year: 1991–92
- Belgian Golden Shoe: 1992
- Ballon 'd Or nomination: 1994
- Greatest Newcastle United XI: 2017
- DH Best Anderlecht Team Ever: 2020
- RBFA 125 Years Icons Team: 2020
- Belgian Golden Shoe Hall of Fame: 2025
