= Peter Jones (referee) =

English football referee

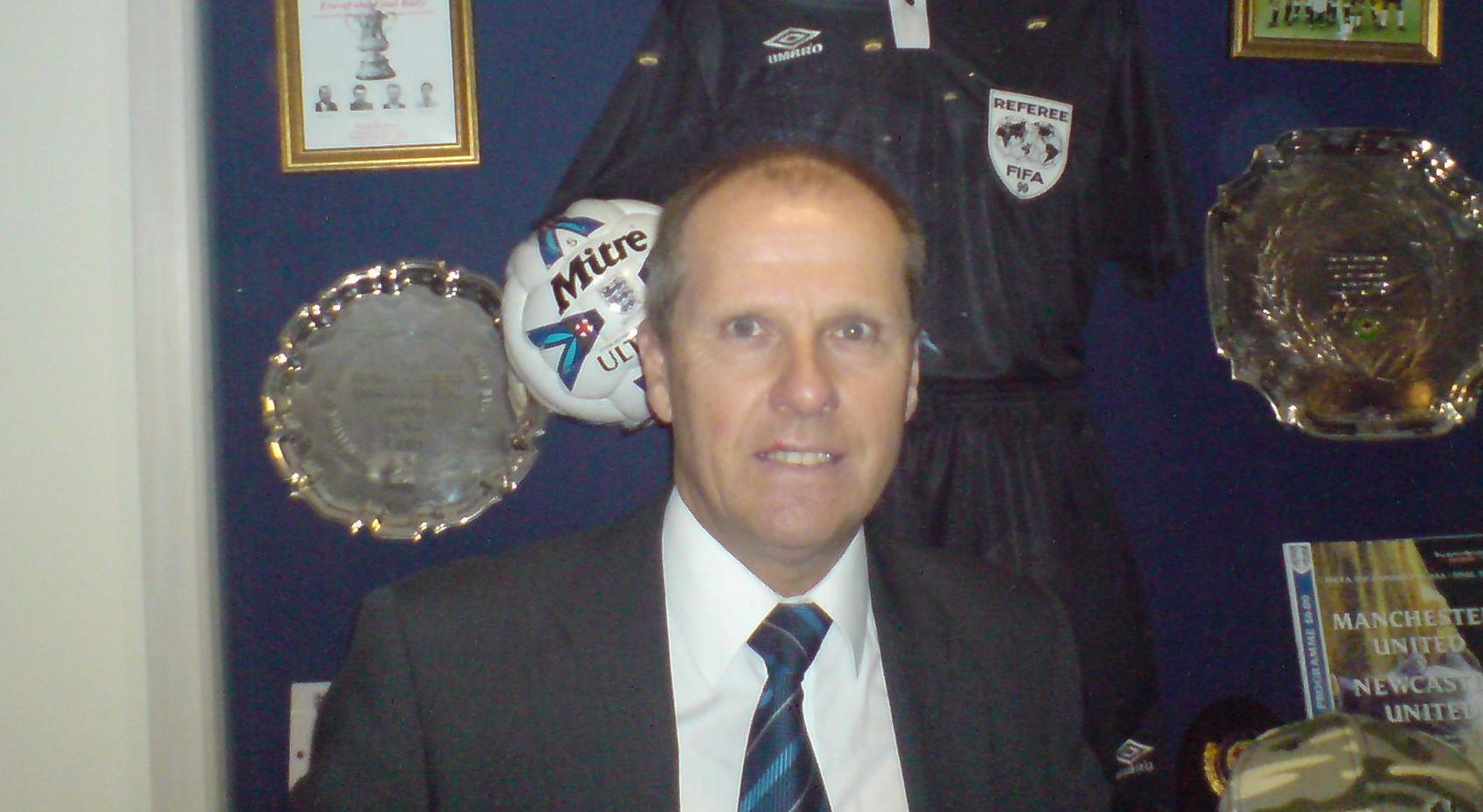
- Born: 24 February 1954 (age 72); Loughborough, Leicestershire, England
- Other occupation: Manager

Domestic
Years	League	Role
? - ?	North Leicestershire League	Referee
? - ?	Midland Intermediate League	Referee
? -1988	Southern League	Referee
1988-1994	Football League	Referee
1994-2002	Premier League	Referee

International
Years	League	Role
1996-2002	FIFA listed	Referee

Peter Jones (born 24 February 1954) is a former English football referee, who retired from officiating at the end of the 2001–02 season. He lives in Quorn, near Loughborough, Leicestershire, and works as a referee assessor.

== Career ==
After appearing as a player in the Leicester City Mutual League, he first took up the whistle himself in a local club match in 1971 after he had seen a friend refereeing. He would then go on to officiate in the North Leicestershire League, Midland Intermediate League (dissolved 1988) and eventually the Southern League.

He was promoted to the Football League list of referees in 1988, and he progressed to the FA Premier League list of referees in 1994. In 1996 Jones became a FIFA referee, where he gained wide international experience.

He was then chosen to handle the Charity Shield match at Wembley on 3 August 1997, between Manchester United and Chelsea, which United won 4–3 on penalties after a 1–1 scoreline at 90 minutes. At the end of the same season, he was appointed to control the Football League Cup Final between Chelsea and Middlesbrough on 29 March 1998, also at Wembley, the 'Blues' being victorious by 2–0 (Frank Sinclair and Roberto Di Matteo both scoring in extra time).

On 13 February 1999 Jones officiated the FA Cup fifth round tie involving Arsenal and Sheffield United at Highbury. The score was locked at 1-1 when a Sheffield player went down injured. A teammate kicked the ball out of play to stop the game, expecting the throw-in to be returned to them on resumption. The ball instead went to Nwankwo Kanu of Arsenal. He passed to Marc Overmars who scored a goal to make the final result 2–1. Jones was unable to disallow the goal according to the Laws. In an unprecedented move the Arsenal manager, Arsène Wenger, offered the game to be replayed, which Arsenal won by an identical scoreline.

He was also the referee for the competition Final of the same year, where Manchester United defeated Newcastle United 2–0, the goals coming from Teddy Sheringham and Paul Scholes.

In the year 2000, he accepted a Master of Arts, honoris causa (Honorary Graduand), degree from professor John Dawkins at Loughborough University.

On 19 April 2001, he began to help promote the Scout Survival Skills Badge, in conjunction with a leading sports whistle manufacturer. He is a former Cub Scout himself.

On 27 April 2002, he took charge of his final game on the Premiership referees' list, between Tottenham and Liverpool, which ended 1–0 to 'Spurs' courtesy of a goal by Gus Poyet.

He has been a member of the UEFA Referees Observers Panel since 2002. In the same year, he travelled with other officials to Kabul, Afghanistan, to referee an ISAF team versus an Afghan Representative team, named "Kabul United", on 15 February, after cessation of hostilities.

Since the year 2003, he has officiated in the national six-a-side tournaments called Masters Football, referees for which are FA endorsed. This competition features ex-professional footballers chosen by the PFA, and is televised on Sky TV.

In his working capacity with Leicester City Football Club, he has been involved in the 'Foxes Against Racism' Campaign 2003–2004, and the 'National Literacy Trust' since 2006.

Preceded by Paul Durkin	FA Cup Final Referee; 1999	Succeeded by Graham Poll
