= David Terrier =

French footballer (born 1973)

Personal information
- Date of birth: 4 August 1973 (age 53)
- Place of birth: Verdun, Meuse, France
- Height: 1.80 m (5 ft 11 in)
- Position: Defender

Senior career*
Years	Team	Apps	(Gls)
1992–1997	FC Metz	125	(1)
1997–1998	West Ham United	1	(0)
1998–1999	Newcastle United	0	(0)
1999–2000	Nice		
2001–2005	Ajaccio		
2005–2007	Créteil		
- * Club domestic league appearances and goals

David Terrier (born 4 August 1973) is a French former footballer who played as a defender.

== Club career ==
Terrier played for FC Metz and AC Ajaccio in Ligue 1. (Note: David Terrier – French league stats at LFP – also available in French (archived)) Terrier also played in the Premier League for West Ham United. He made only one appearance, on 9 August 1997, coming on as a substitute for Paul Kitson in a 2–1 away win against Barnsley.

== Honours ==
FC Metz

- Coupe de la Ligue: 1995–96

Ajaccio

- Division 2: 2001–02
