= North Leicestershire Football League =

Association football league in England

The North Leicestershire League is a football competition based in Leicestershire, England. This league was established in 1931 and was formerly known as the Loughborough and District Amateur Football Alliance. It has a total of four divisions, the highest of which, the Premier Division, is a feeder to the Leicestershire Senior League. Each division has a different sponsor.

== Champions ==
Season	Premier Division	Division One	Division Two	Division Three	Division Four
1989–90	Ravenstone	Wheatsheaf	Grace Dieu United Reserves	Ellistown Colliery Reserves	Soar Valley Swifts
1990–91	Wheatsheaf	Grace Dieu United Reserves	Schlegel UK	Loughborough Dynamo "A"	Schlegel UK Reserves
1991–92	Hillside Rangers	Loughborough Town	Shepshed Amateurs	Blackbird Reserves	Loughborough Town Reserves
1992–93	Ingles	Three Horse Shoes	Loughborough Dynamo "A"	Coalville Old Edwardians Reserves	Groby
1993–94	Hillside Rangers	West End United	Charnwood Sportsmen	Loughborough Town Reserves	Rockhouse Rovers
1994–95	Ashby Ivanhoe	Hathern Three Crowns	Loughborough Town Reserves	East Leake Albion	Shepshed Amateurs Reserves
1995–96	Ingles	Woodhouse Imperial	Ashby Ivanhoe Reserves	Measham Imperial Reserves	Hathern Three Crowns Reserves
1996–97	Ashby Ivanhoe	Ashby Ivanhoe Reserves	Markfield Red Lion	Shelthorpe Kings Church	Peggs Green Reserves
1997–98	Hillside Rangers	Ashby Ivanhoe Reserves	Measham Imperial	Groby	Crown & Cushion
1998–99	Ashby Ivanhoe	Measham Imperial	Shelthorpe Kings Church	Dynamo Roshal	Azzurri
1999–2000	Hathern	Shelthorpe Kings Church	Peggs Green	Azzurri	FC Ricks
2000–01	Sileby United WMC	Kegworth Town	Ravenstone	FC Ricks	East Leake Villa
2001–02	Hathern	Azzurri	Astrazeneca R&D Charnwood	East Leake Villa	Peacock United
2002–03	Ashby Ivanhoe	New Inn Woodville	East Leake Villa	Newbold Jubilee	Sileby United WMC Reserves
2003–04	Hathern	Dynamo Roshal	Sileby Saints	Sutton Bonington	Anstey Town 'A'
2004–05	Hathern	Sileby Saints	Loughborough Dynamo 'A'	The Railway	Lithuanian-Scandinavian
2005–06	Hathern	Genesis	Radmoor	Lithuanian-Scandinavian	3M Loughborough
2006–07	Sileby Saints	Radmoor	Newbold Jubilee	Kegworth Imperial	Ingles Reserves
2007–08	FC Dynamo	Caterpillar	Whitwick Wanderers	The Railway EWM	ATI Garryson Reserves
2008–09	Melton Mowbray Building Society	Falcons	Birstall Old Boys	Ingles Reserves	Whitwick Wanderers Reserves
2009–10	Caterpillar	Birstall Old Boys	Bagworth Colliery	Greenhill Youth Centre	Markfield 'A'
2010–11	Sileby Saints	East Leake Athletic	Greenhill Youth Centre	Coalville Labour Club	Shepshed Amateurs Reserves
2011–12	Falcons	Greenhill Youth Centre	ATI Garryson	Ferrari	Anstey Crown Reserves
2012–13	Anstey Town	Loughborough	Whitwick White Horse	Loughborough United	Shelthorpe
2013–14	Ingles	Shelthorpe Dynamo	Ravenstone United	Mountsorrel Amateurs Reserves	
2014–15	Shelthorpe Dynamo	Ravenstone United	Sileby Working Mens Club	Shepshed Amateurs	
2015–16	Ravenstone United	Bottesford	Birstall Old Boys	Sporting Markfield	
2016–17	Caterpillar	Wymeswold	Kegworth Imperial	FC Polonia	
2017–18	Greenhill YC	Shelthorpe Dynamo	Market Bosworth	Wymeswold Reserves	
2018–19	Greenhill YC	Shepshed Amateurs	Wymeswold Reserves	Sporting Markfield Reserves	
2019–20	Season cancelled	Season cancelled			

== Member clubs 2019–20 ==
=== Coalville Trophies Premiership ===
- Asfordby Development
- Belton Villa
- East Leake Robins
- Falcons
- FC Coalville
- Kegworth Imperial
- Loughborough United
- Measham Welfare
- Mountsorrel Amateurs
- Shepshed Amateurs
- Thringstone MW
- Woodhouse Imperial

=== Shedland.co.uk Championship ===
- Birstall Old Boys
- Bottesford Reserves
- Greenhill YC 'A'
- Loughborough United Reserves
- Mountsorrel
- Newbold Verdon Reserves
- Quorn Rangers
- Shepshed Amateurs Reserves
- Sporting Markfield Reserves
- Sutton Bonington Reserves
- Thorpe Acre
- Thringstone MW Reserves
- Woodhouse Imperial Reserves

== Cups ==
The league runs two cup competitions, the Cobbin Trophy and the Bonser Trophy. The Cobbin Trophy is open to all first teams, whilst the Bonser Trophy is for reserve and 'A' teams.

== Previous winners ==
Season	Cobbin Trophy	Bonser Trophy
1980–81	Markfield Rovers	Belton Villa Reserves
1981–82	Ingles	Belton Villa Reserves
1982–83	Thorpe Acre	Lodge Farm YC Reserves
1983–84	Lodge Farm YC	Thorpe Acre Reserves
1984–85	Lodge Farm YC	Lodge Farm YC Reserves
1985–86	Lodge Farm YC	Lodge Farm YC Reserves
1986–87	Lodge Farm YC	Belton Villa Reserves
1987–88	Shepshed Athletic	Lodge Farm YC Reserves
1988–89	Grace Dieu United	Lodge Farm YC Reserves
1989–90	Ravenstone	Belton Villa Reserves
1990–91	Wheatsheaf	Grace Dieu United Reserves
1991–92	Belton Villa	Ashby Ivanhoe Reserves
1992–93	Hillside Rangers	Ashby Ivanhoe Reserves
1993–94	Ingles	Ingles Reserves
1994–95	Ingles	West End United Reserves
1995–96	Hillside Rangers	Loughborough Town Reserves
1996–97	Ashby Ivanhoe	Peggs Green Reserves
1997–98	Ingles	Loughborough Dynamo "A"
1998–99	Woodhouse Imperial	Birstall Old Boys Reserves
1999–2000	Woodhouse Imperial	Thurmaston Rangers Reserves
2000–01	Hathern	Birstal Old Boys Reserves
2001–02	Loughborough Towers	Ashby Ivanhoe Reserves
2002–03	–	Ashby Ivanhoe Reserves
2003–04	Hathern	Hathern Reserves
2004–05	Gresley Miners Arms	Hathern Reserves
2005–06	Sileby Saints	Loughborough Dynamo "A"
2006–07	Sileby Saints	The Railway Reserves
2007–08	Sileby Saints	ATI Garryson Reserves
2008-09		
2009–10		
2010–11	Markfield	
2011–12		Ingles Reserves
2012–13	Whitwick	Ingles Reserves
2013–14	Shelthorpe Dynamo	Birstall Old Boys
2014–15		Greenhill YC Reserves
2015–16	Ravenstone United	Loughborough Reserves
2016–17	East Leake	Greenhill YC Reserves
2017–18	Greenhill YC	Asfordby Development
2018–19	Falcons	Sporting Markfield Reserves
2019–20	Season cancelled	Season cancelled
