= Peter Keen (footballer) =

English footballer

Personal information
- Full name: Peter Keen
- Date of birth: 16 November 1976 (age 49)
- Place of birth: Middlesbrough, England
- Position: Goalkeeper

Youth career
- –1995: Newcastle United

Senior career*
Years	Team	Apps	(Gls)
1995–1999	Newcastle United	0	(0)
1999–2004	Carlisle United	61	(1)
2001	→ Darlington (loan)	7	(0)
2004–2005	Scarborough	4	(0)
2005–2006	Gateshead	32	(0)
2006–2007	Horden Colliery Welfare	8	(0)
2007–2008	Gateshead	25	(0)
2008–2009	Billingham Synthonia	4	(0)
Total		131	(1)
- * Club domestic league appearances and goals

Peter Alan Keen (born 16 November 1976) is an English professional football goalkeeper.

== Football career ==
Keen was born in Middlesbrough and began his career as a trainee with Newcastle United, turning professional in August 1995.

He joined Carlisle United on a free transfer in June 1999.

He let in five goals on his Carlisle debut, a 5–2 defeat away to Halifax Town and did not play again until the following February when he let in another four goals away to Rotherham United. On 24 October 2000, Keen scored for Carlisle with a kick from his own penalty area in the 3–2 defeat away to Blackpool.

He joined Darlington on loan in March 2001, before returning to the reserves at Carlisle. He finally gained a regular place in the Carlisle side during the 2001–02 season, but was released at the end of the season as Carlisle sought to cut costs. However, he re-signed for the club before the start of the next season but after then was ousted as first-choice keeper by Matt Glennon.

Carlisle were relegated to the Conference in 2004, but Keen remained with the Cumbrians until September that year when he joined fellow Conference side Scarborough on a free transfer, playing just four times before suffering a serious shoulder injury.

He left Scarborough at the end of the 2004–05 season and was a regular in the Gateshead side during the 2005–06 season, but left to join Horden Colliery Welfare at the end of the season. In February 2007 he rejoined Gateshead. Keen joined Billingham Synthonia before the start of the 2008–09 season.
