= Ralf Keidel =

German footballer (born 1977)

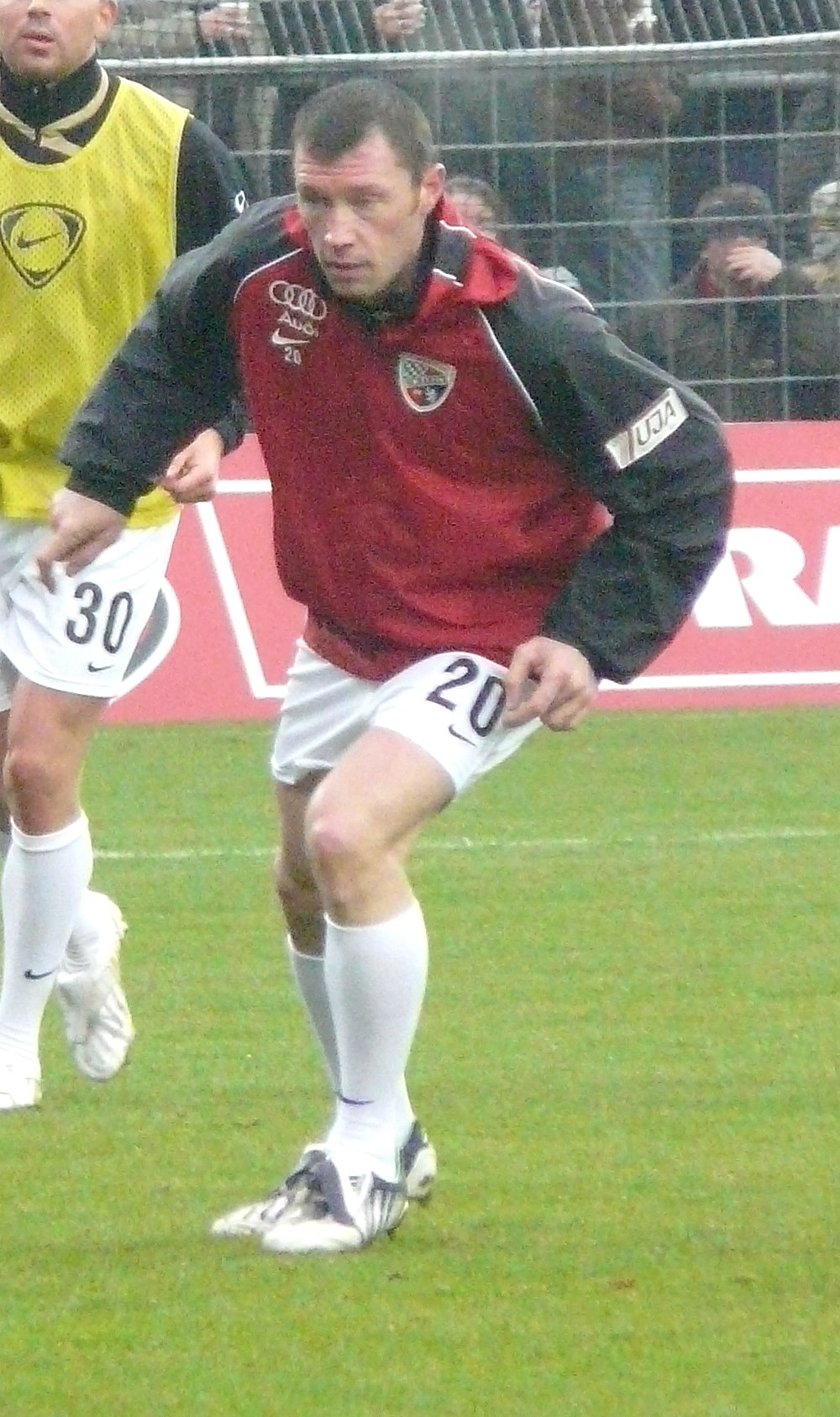
- Keidel in 2008

Personal information
- Date of birth: 6 March 1977 (age 49)
- Place of birth: Würzburg, West Germany
- Height: 1.80 m (5 ft 11 in)
- Position: Midfielder

Team information
- Current team: FC Ingolstadt 04 II (assistant)

Youth career
- ASV Rimpar
- Kickers Würzburg

Senior career*
Years	Team	Apps	(Gls)
1996–1997	1. FC Schweinfurt 05		
1997–1999	Newcastle United	0	(0)
1999–2004	MSV Duisburg	109	(6)
2004–2005	Rot-Weiß Oberhausen	30	(1)
2005–2006	LR Ahlen	30	(0)
2006–2011	FC Ingolstadt 04	111	(4)
2011–2013	FC Ingolstadt 04 II	47	(1)

International career
1997–1999	Germany U21	5	(0)
1998	Germany Olympic	4	(0)

Managerial career
- 2013–: FC Ingolstadt 04 II (assistant)
- * Club domestic league appearances and goals

Ralf Keidel (born 6 March 1977) is a German football coach and former player. He works as assistant manager for FC Ingolstadt 04 II.

== Career ==
Keidel made his debut on the German professional league level in the Bundesliga for MSV Duisburg on 31 March 2000 when he came on as a substitute in the 88th minute in a game against SSV Ulm 1846.
