= List of Newcastle United F.C. records and statistics =

This article lists the records of Newcastle United Football Club.

== Honours and achievements ==
League

- First Division / Premier League (level 1)
  - Champions (4): 1904–05, 1906–07, 1908–09, 1926–27
  - Runners-up: 1995–96, 1996–97
- Second Division / First Division / Championship (level 2)
  - Champions (4): 1964–65, 1992–93, 2009–10, 2016–17
  - Runners-up: 1897–98, 1947–48

Cup

- FA Cup
  - Winners (6): 1909–10, 1923–24, 1931–32, 1950–51, 1951–52, 1954–55
  - Runners-up (7): 1904–05, 1905–06, 1907–08, 1910–11, 1973–74, 1997–98, 1998–99
- Football League Cup / EFL Cup
  - Winners (1): 2024–25
  - Runners-up: 1975–76, 2022–23
- FA Charity Shield
  - Winners: 1909
  - Runners-up (5): 1932, 1951, 1952, 1955, 1996
- Inter-Cities Fairs Cup
  - Winners: 1968–69

Minor titles

- Sheriff of London Charity Shield
  - Winners: 1907
- Texaco Cup
  - Winners: 1973–74, 1974–75
- UEFA Intertoto Cup
  - Winners: 2006
- Anglo-Italian Cup
  - Winners: 1973
- Kirin Cup Soccer
  - Winners: 1983

== Club records ==
=== Top 10 record transfer fees paid ===
Rank	Player	Fee	From	Date
1	(Germany) Nick Woltemade	£69,300,000	(Germany) VfB Stuttgart	August 2025
2	(Sweden) Alexander Isak	£63,000,000	(Spain) Real Sociedad	August 2022
3	(Democratic Republic of the Congo) Yoane Wissa	£55,000,000	(England) Brentford	September 2025
3	(Sweden) Anthony Elanga	£55,000,000	(England) Nottingham Forest	July 2025
3	(Italy) Sandro Tonali	£55,000,000	(Italy) Milan	July 2023
6	(Belgium) Matias Fernandez-Pardo	£51,000,000	(France) Lille	September 2026
7	(Spain) Nico González	£50,000,000	(England) Manchester City	August 2026
8	(England) Anthony Gordon	£45,000,000	(England) Everton	January 2023
9	(England) Jacob Ramsey	£43,000,000	(England) Aston Villa	August 2025
10	(Ivory Coast) Bazoumana Touré	£42,800,000	(Germany) TSG Hoffenheim	July 2026

=== Top 10 record transfer fees received ===
Rank	Player	Fee	From	Date
1	(Sweden) Alexander Isak	£125,000,000	(England) Liverpool	September 2025
2	(Italy) Sandro Tonali	£100,000,000	(England) Tottenham Hotspur	July 2026
3	(Brazil) Bruno Guimarães	£75,000,000	(England) Arsenal	August 2026
4	(England) Anthony Gordon	£69,300,000	(Spain) Barcelona	July 2026 (Note: The transfer was announced in May 2026 and would become official in July 2026 once the La Liga transfer window opened.)
5	(England) Elliot Anderson	£35,000,000	(England) Nottingham Forest	June 2024
5	(England) Andy Carroll	£35,000,000	(England) Liverpool	January 2011
7	(The Gambia) Yankuba Minteh	£33,000,000	(England) Brighton & Hove Albion	June 2024
8	(Spain) Ayoze Pérez	£30,000,000	(England) Leicester City	July 2019
8	(France) Moussa Sissoko	£30,000,000	(England) Tottenham Hotspur	August 2016
10	(Serbia) Aleksandar Mitrović	£27,000,000	(England) Fulham	July 2018

=== Attendances ===
- Highest attendance – 68,386 (v. Chelsea, First Division, 3 September 1930)
- Highest average attendance – 56,299, Second Division, 1947–48

=== Wins ===
- Record victory: 13–0 v. Newport County, Second Division, 5 October 1946
- Record away league victory: 8–0 v. Sheffield United, Premier League, 24 September 2023
- Record away FA Cup victory: 9–0 v. Southport, FA Cup, 1 February 1932 (Note: match replayed at Hillsborough)
- Record UEFA Champions League victory: 6–1 (v. Qarabağ, UEFA Champions League, 2025–26 squad, 18 February 2026)

- Record home UEFA Champions League victory: 4–1 (v. PSG, UEFA Champions League, 2023–24 squad, 4 October 2023)

Notable records: record home wins in UEFA Champions League

Record home wins cited in various reliable databases, or the literature, in the UEfA Champions League

Detail	Score
Record home wins in the UEFA Champions League
(v. Željezničar, UEFA Champions League third round qualifier, 2002–03 squad, 28 August 2002) (Note: third round qualifier)	4–0
(v. PSG, UEFA Champions League, 2023–24 squad, 4 October 2023)	4–1
(v. PSV, UEFA Champions League, 2025–26 squad, 21 January 2026)	3–0

- Record away UEFA Champions League victory: 6–1 (v. Qarabağ, UEFA Champions League, 2025–26 squad, 18 February 2026)

Notable records: record away wins in UEFA Champions League

Record away wins cited in various reliable databases, or the literature, in the UEfA Champions League

Detail	Score
Record away wins in the UEFA Champions League
(v. Qarabağ, UEFA Champions League, 2025–26 squad, 18 February 2026)	6–1
(v. Union St. Gilloise, UEFA Champions League, 2025–26 squad, 1 October 2025)	4–0

- Record half-time lead in the UEFA Champions League 5-0 (v. Qarabağ, UEFA Champions League, 2025–26 squad, 18 February 2026)

- Record consecutive wins: 9, cup and league, 15 January 2025
- Record consecutive home game wins in the Football League: 20 home games, 1 April 1907. (Note: twenty home games over two seasons.)
- Record winning start with home matches in Football League: first 18 Division 1 home games, Football League, 1906–07 squad, 1 April 1907.
- Wins by three plus goals in consecutive Premier League games – 3 consecutive games, Premier League, 2024–25 squad, 26 December 2024.

=== Defeats ===
- Record defeat: 0–9 v. Burton Wanderers, Second Division, 15 April 1895

=== Goals. ===
- Most League goals scored in a season – 98 in 42 matches, First Division, 1951–52
- Fewest League goals scored in a season – 30 in 42 matches, Second Division, 1980–81
- Most League goals conceded in a season – 109 in 42 matches, First Division, 1960–61
- Fewest League goals conceded in a season – 33 in 38 matches, Premier League, 2022–23, and 33 in 34 matches, First Division, 1904–05
- Most different scorers in a single Premier League match – 8, Sean Longstaff, Dan Burn, Sven Botman, Callum Wilson, Anthony Gordon, Miguel Almirón, Bruno Guimarães and Alexander Isak (v. Sheffield United, Premier League, 24 September 2023)
- Most League goals scored against one club in a Premier League season – 13 goals over two matches (v. Sheffield United, Premier League, 27 April 2024.
- Scored in every home game in a Premier League season – all 19 matches, Premier League, 2023–24 squad, 11 May 2024
- Most team goals scored in a Premier League season – 85 goals, Premier League, 2023–24 squad, 19 May 2024

== Player records ==
=== Appearances ===
==== Appearances (streaks) ====
- **Consecutive Premier League matches played** – Shay Given, 140 matches. (v. Bolton, Premier League, 2004–05 squad, 31 October 2004).

Notable records: consecutive Premier League appearances

**Bold** signifies current Newcastle United player.

Rank	Player	Detail	Games
Players with notable consecutive Premier League games played records
1	Shay Given	(v. Bolton, Premier League, 2004–05 squad, 31 October 2004)	140
2	Martin Dúbravka	(v. Liverpool, Premier League, 2019–20 squad, 26 July 2020)	88
3	Bruno Guimarães	(v. Wolves, Premier League, 2025–26 squad, 13 September 2025)	68

- **Latest player to play in all Premier League games in a season** – all 38 matches, Bruno Guimaraes (2024–25 squad)

Notable records: players who appeared in every game in a Premier League season

Newcastle players cited in various reliable databases, or the literature, considered and selected from a squad, to appear in every game in a Premier League season.

Rank	Player	Detail	Games
Players who appeared in every game in a Premier League season
1	Gary Speed	1998–99 squad	38
2	Shay Given	2001–02 squad	38
3	Shay Given	2002–03 squad	38
4	Shay Given	2003–04 squad	38
5	Gary Speed	2003–04 squad	38
6	Shay Given	2005–06 squad	38
7	Tim Krul	2011–12 squad	38
8	Georginio Wijnaldum	2015–16 squad	38
9	Martin Dúbravka	2018–19 squad	38
10	Martin Dúbravka	2019–20 squad	38
11	Joelinton	2019–20 squad	38
12	Dan Burn	2022–23 squad	38
13	Kieran Trippier	2022–23 squad	38
14	Bruno Guimaraes	2024–25 squad	38

A complete database shows that by December 2025, almost 280 players have appeared at least once for Newcastle United in the Premier League. Premier League data also shows that less than 10 players have managed to play in every game in a season. Showing roughly 3% of these players that have played for Newcastle have appeared in every Premier League game in a season. This shows the rareness, up to December 2025, for any coaching staff to consider and select a player to play in every Premier League game in a campaign.

Complete data from the Premier League also shows prior to the 1995–96 season, no Newcastle player completed a full 42 game Premier League season. (Note: From the 1995–96 season, a 38 game Premier League campaign was introduced.) Though a number of players did play 38 games or more in a 42-game season, with Rob Lee managing 41 games in the 1993–94 season.

All that said, various coaching staff have assessed and selected a handful of players to play in every game in a 38-game season.

A stand-out

Shay Given stands out. The keeper played in every game in four full seasons and three of these seasons, 2001–02, 2002–03 and 2003–04 were consecutive. His run was interrupted in the 2004–05 season. Given then went on to complete the 2005–06 season. The Republic of Ireland International was almost undroppable in every game for five consecutive seasons, only missing two matches.

Other landmark records

The Premier League records show that alongside Shay Given, players such as Gary Speed and Martin Dúbravka had been assessed and selected to appear in every Premier League game in a full season more than once. Presenting the knowledge that roughly 1% of players have managed a full season more than once.

Players who almost did it

A few notable players have nearly attained a full season status. These players include Andy Cole, Les Ferdinand and Alan Shearer. Cole managed 40 games in a 42 games with the 1993–94 squad. Ferdinand managed 37 games in a 38-game season with the 1995–96 squad. Shearer has managed a 37-game season three times with the 1999–00, 2001–02 and 2003–04 squads.

==== Appearances (firsts) ====
- **First unused substitute** – Albert Bennett (v. Nottingham Forest, Football League First Division 1965–66 squad, 21 August 1965)
- **First used substitute** – Ollie Burton (v. Northampton Town, Football League First Division 1965–66 squad, 4 September 1965)
- **First black player to make an appearance** – Howard Gayle (v. Cambridge, Football League, 1982–83 squad, 27 November 1982)

Notable records: first black Newcastle United footballers

First black players

Rank	Player	Detail
Newcastle United's first black footballers
1	Howard Gayle	(v. Cambridge, Football League, 1982–83 squad, 27 November 1982)
2	Tony Cunningham	(v. Manchester United, Football League, 1984–85 squad, 9 February 1985)
3	Mirandinha	(v. Norwich City, Football League, 1987–88 squad, 1 September 1987)
4	Franz Carr	(v. Charlton Athletic, Football League, 1991–92 squad, 18 August 1991)
5	Justin Fashanu	(v. Peterborough United, League Cup, 1991–92 squad, 29 October 1991)
6	Andy Cole	(v. Swindon Town, Football League, 1992–93 squad, 13 March 1993)
7	Ruel Fox	(v. Wimbledon, Premier League, 1993–94 squad, 12 February 1994)
8	Les Ferdinand	(v. Coventry City, Premier League, 1995–96 squad, 19 August 1995)
8	Shaka Hislop	(v. Coventry City, Premier League, 1995–96 squad, 19 August 1995)
10	Tino Asprilla	(v. Middlesbrough, Premier League, 1995–96 squad, 10 February 1996)
11	John Barnes	(v. Wimbledon, Premier League, 1997–98 squad, 13 September 1997)

The Show Racism the Red Card initiative was created in Newcastle by former Newcastle goalkeeper, Shaka Hislop in January 1996.

On 18 April 2026, in a game against Bournemouth, Newcastle United, the initiative and Wor Flags, celebrated the first ever 11 black Newcastle players.

==== Appearances (most) ====
- **Most appearances in all competitions record** – Jimmy Lawrence, 496
  - **Current player with most appearances** – **Fabian Schar**, 251 (as of 3 February 2026)

Notable records: most appearances in all competitions

As of 25 November 2012 (competitive matches only, includes appearances as substitute):

	Name	Career	Appearances	Goals
1	Jimmy Lawrence	1904–1922	496	0
2	Frank Hudspeth	1910–1929	472	37
3	Shay Given	1997–2009	463	0
4	Frank Clark	1962–1975	457	1
5	Bill McCracken	1904–1923	432	8
6	Alf McMichael	1949–1963	432	1
7	David Craig	1962–1978	412	11
8	Bobby Mitchell	1949–1961	410	113
9	Alan Shearer	1996–2006	405	206
10	Jackie Milburn	1943–1957	397	200

- **Most appearances specifically in the UEFA Champions League** – 15, Anthony Gordon (v. Qarabağ, UEFA Champions League, 2025–26 squad, 18 February 2026)

==== Appearances (age) ====
- **Oldest player** – Jimmy Lawrence,43 years and 60 days (v. Bradford City, First Division, 1921–22 squad, 17 April 1922) (Note: Billy Hampson was thought to be the oldest player to play for Newcastle. Data shows the record belongs to Jimmy Lawrence.)

Notable records: oldest players who appeared in any competition

Oldest Newcastle players cited in various reliable databases, or the literature, considered and selected from a squad, to appear in any game

Player	Detail	Age
Oldest players who appeared in a match
Jimmy Lawrence	(v. Bradford City, First Division, 1921–22 squad, 17 April 1922)	43 years and 60 days
Billy Hampson	(v. Birmingham City, First Division, 1926–27 squad, 9 April 1927)	42 years and 226 days

- **Oldest player specifically in a Premier League match** – Pavel Srníček, 38 years and 291 days (v. Bolton Wanderers, Premier League, 2006–07 squad, 26 December 2006)

Notable records: Oldest players specifically in Premier League games

Oldest Newcastle players cited in various reliable databases, or the literature, considered and selected from a squad, to appear in a Premier League game

Player	Detail	Age
Oldest players who appeared in a Premier League game
Pavel Srníček	(v. Bolton Wanderers, Premier League, 2006–07 squad, 26 December 2006)	38 years and 291 days
Steve Harper	(v. Arsenal, Premier League, 2012–13 squad, 19 May 2013)	38 years and 66 days
Stuart Pearce	(v. Liverpool, Premier League, 1998–99 squad, 28 December 1998)	36 years and 248 days
Sol Campbell	(v. Stoke City, Premier League, 2010–11 squad, 19 March 2011)	36 years and 182 days
Peter Beardsley	(v. Nottingham Forest, Premier League, 1996–97 squad, 11 May 1997)	36 years and 113 days
Ian Rush	(v. Sheffield Wednesday, Premier League, 1997–98 squad, 10 January 1998)	36 years and 82 days
Martin Dúbravka	(v. Manchester City, Premier League, 2024–25 squad, 15 February 2025)	36 years and 31 days
Tommy Wright	(v. Chelsea, Premier League, 1999–00 squad, 11 September 1999)	36 years and 13 days
Rob Lee	(v. Manchester United, Premier League, 2001–02 squad, 2 January 2002)	35 years and 335 days
Alan Shearer	(v. Sunderland, Premier League, 2005–06 squad, 17 April 2006)	35 years and 247 days

- **Youngest player** – Steve Watson, 16 years and 223 days (v. Wolves, Second Division, 1990–91 squad, 10 November 1990)

Notable records: youngest players who appeared in any competition

Youngest Newcastle players cited in various reliable databases, or the literature, considered and selected from a squad, to appear in any match

Player	Detail	Age
Youngest players who appeared in any all competitions game
Steve Watson	(v. Wolves, Second Division, 1990–91 squad, 10 November 1990)	16 years and 223 days
Paul Ferris	(v. Blackburn, Second Division, 1981–82 squad, 1 May 1982)	16 years and 295 days
Neil McDonald	(v. Barnsley, Second Division, 1982–83 squad, 25 September 1982)	16 years and 327 days
Haris Vuckic	(v. Huddersfield, Championship, 2009–10 squad, 26 August 2009)	17 years and 5 days
Kazenga LuaLua	(v. Stoke, FA Cup, 2007–08 squad, 6 January 2008)	17 years and 27 days
Lewis Miley	(v. Chelsea, Premier League, 2022–23 squad, 28 May 2023)	17 years and 27 days
John Watson	(v. Hull, Second Division, 1990–91 squad, 11 May 1991)	17 years and 27 days
Adam Armstrong	(v. Fulham, Premier League, 2013–14 squad, 15 March 2014)	17 years and 33 days
Robbie Elliott	(v. Middlesbrough, Second Division, 1990–91 squad, 12 March 1991)	17 years and 77 days
Tony Lormor	(v. Spurs, First Division, 1987–88 squad, 23 January 1988)	17 years and 86 days
James Soulsby	(v. Middlesbrough, First Division, 1914–15 squad, 10 March 1915)	17 years and 94 days
Jock Rutherford	(v. Bolton, First Division, 1901–02 squad, 1 March 1902)	17 years and 140 days
Alan Suddick	(v. Charlton, Second Division, 1961–62 squad, 7 October 1961)	17 years and 158 days
Geoff Allen	(v. Norwich, Second Division, 1963–64 squad, 25 April 1964)	17 years and 167 days
Aidan McCaffrey	(v. Ipswich, First Division, 1974–75 squad, 15 March 1975)	17 years and 197 days

- **Youngest player specifically in European competition** – Lewis Miley, 17 years and 190 days (v. Borussia Dortmund, UEFA Champions League, 2023–24 squad, 7 November 2023)
- **Youngest player specifically in a FA Cup match** – Kazenga LuaLua, 17 years and 27 days(v. Stoke, FA Cup, 2007–08 squad, 6 January 2008)
- **Youngest player specifically in a Premier League match** – Lewis Miley, 17 years and 27 days (v. Chelsea, Premier League, 2022–23 squad, 28 May 2023)

Notable records: youngest players specifically in Premier League games

Youngest Newcastle players cited in various reliable databases, or the literature, considered and selected from a squad, to appear in a Premier League game

Player	Detail	Age
Youngest players who appeared in a Premier League game
Lewis Miley	(v. Chelsea, Premier League, 2022–23 squad, 28 May 2023)	17 years and 27 days
Adam Armstrong	(v. Fulham, Premier League, 2013–14 squad, 15 March 2014)	17 years and 33 days
Kazenga Lua Lua	(v. Bolton Wanderers, Premier League, 2007–08 squad, 19 January 2008)	17 years and 40 days
Andy Carroll	(v. Wigan Athletic, Premier League, 2006–07 squad, 25 February 2007)	18 years and 50 days
Aaron Hughes	(v. Sheffield Wednesday, Premier League, 1997–98 squad, 10 January 1998)	18 years and 63 days
Steven Taylor	(v. Bolton Wanderers, Premier League, 2003–04 squad, 28 March 2004)	18 years and 65 days
Adam Campbell	(v. Stoke City, Premier League, 2012–13 squad, 10 March 2013)	18 years and 68 days
Elliott Anderson	(v. Arsenal, Premier League, 2020–21 squad, 18 January 2021)	18 years and 73 days
Charles N'Zogbia	(v. Blackburn Rovers, Premier League, 2004–05 squad, 11 September 2004)	18 years and 106 days
Chris Holland	(v. Ipswich Town, Premier League, 1993–94 squad, 23 March 1994)	18 years and 193 days

- **Youngest player, specifically in the Premier League, to make 50 appearances** – Lewis Miley, 19 years and 262 days (v. Wolves, Premier League, 2025–26 squad, 18 January 2026)

=== Captains ===
- **Current captain** – **Dan Burn**

Notable records: Newcastle United captains

Captains of Newcastle United

**Bold** signifies current Newcastle United player.

Notable records: captains 2020s

Captains	Season
2020s
Jamaal Lascelles	2020–21
Jamaal Lascelles	2021–22
Jamaal Lascelles; Kieran Trippier	2022–23
Jamaal Lascelles; Kieran Trippier	2023–24
Jamaal Lascelles; Kieran Trippier; Bruno Guimarães	2024–25
Jamaal Lascelles; Kieran Trippier; Bruno Guimarães	2025–26
**Dan Burn**	2026–27

Table last updated: 17 June 2025

Notable records: captains 2010s

Captains	Season
2010s
Kevin Nolan	2010–11
Fabricio Coloccini	2011–12
Fabricio Coloccini	2012–13
Fabricio Coloccini	2013–14
Fabricio Coloccini	2014–15
Fabricio Coloccini	2015–16
Jamaal Lascelles	2016–17
Jamaal Lascelles	2017–18
Jamaal Lascelles	2018–19
Jamaal Lascelles	2019–20

Notable records: captains 2000s

Captains	Season
2000s
Alan Shearer	2000–01
Alan Shearer	2001–02
Alan Shearer	2002–03
Alan Shearer	2003–04
Alan Shearer	2004–05
Alan Shearer	2005–06
Scott Parker; Shay Given	2006–07
Alan Smith; Michael Owen	2007–08
Michael Owen; Nicky Butt	2008–09
Nicky Butt; Alan Smith	2009–10

Notable records: captains 1990s

Captains	Season
1990s
Roy Aitken	1990–91
Kevin Scott	1991–92
Brian Kilcline; Barry Venison	1992–93
Barry Venison; Peter Beardsley	1993–94
Peter Beardsley	1994–95
Peter Beardsley	1995–96
Peter Beardsley	1996–97
Rob Lee	1997–98
Rob Lee; Alan Shearer	1998–99
Alan Shearer	1999–00

Notable records: captains 1980s

Captains	Season
1980s
Mick Martin	1980–81
Mick Martin	1981–82
Kevin Keegan	1982–83
Kevin Keegan	1983–84
Glenn Roeder	1984–85
Glenn Roeder	1985–86
Glenn Roeder	1986–87
Glenn Roeder	1987–88
Dave Beasant; Kenny Sansom	1988–89
Roy Aitken	1989–90

Notable records: captains 1970s

Captains	Season
1970s
Bobby Moncur	1970–71
Bobby Moncur	1971–72
Bobby Moncur	1972–73
Bobby Moncur	1973–74
Frank Clark	1974–75
Geoff Nulty	1975–76
Geoff Nulty	1976–77
Geoff Nulty	1977–78
Terry Hibbitt; Irving Nattrass	1978–79
Mick Martin	1979–80

Notable records: captains 1960s

Captains	Season
1960s
Ivor Allchurch	1960–61
Bill McKinney	1961–62
Dick Keith	1962–63
Stan Anderson	1963–64
Stan Anderson	1964–65
Jim Iley	1965–66
Jim Iley	1966–67
Bobby Moncur	1967–68
Bobby Moncur	1968–69
Bobby Moncur	1969–70

Notable records: captains 1950s

Captains	Season
1950s
Joe Harvey	1950–51
Joe Harvey	1951–52
Joe Harvey	1952–53
Jimmy Scoular; Alf McMichael	1953–54
Jimmy Scoular	1954–55
Jimmy Scoular	1955–56
Jimmy Scoular	1956–57
Bob Stokoe	1957–58
Bob Stokoe	1958–59
Bob Stokoe	1959–60

Notable records: captains 1940s

Captains	Season
1940s
Henry Clifton	1944–45
Joe Harvey	1945–46
Joe Harvey	1946–47
Joe Harvey	1947–48
Joe Harvey	1948–49
Joe Harvey	1949–50

Notable records: captains 1930s

Captains	Season
1930s
Jack Hill	1930–31
Jimmy Nelson	1931–32
Jimmy Nelson	1932–33
Jimmy Nelson	1933–34
Jimmy Nelson	1934–35
Tony Leach	1935–36
Bill Imrie	1936–37
Bill Imrie	1937–38
James Denmark	1938–39

Notable records: captains 1920s

Captains	Season
1920s
Wilf Low	1920–21
Wilf Low	1921–22
Wilf Low	1922–23
Frank Hudspeth	1923–24
Frank Hudspeth	1924–25
Frank Hudspeth	1925–26
Hughie Gallacher	1926–27
Hughie Gallacher	1927–28
Jack Hill	1928–29
Jack Hill	1929–30

Notable records: captains 1910s

Captains	Season
1910s
Andy Aitken	1910–11
Bill McCracken	1911–12
Bill McCracken	1912–13
James Hay	1913–14
James Hay	1914–15
Bill McCracken	1919–20

Notable records: captains 1900s

Captains	Season
1900s
Andy Aitken	1900–01
Andy Aitken	1901–02
Andy Aitken	1902–03
Andy Aitken	1903–04
Andy Aitken	1904–05
Alec Gardner	1905–06
Alec Gardner	1906–07
Alec Gardner	1907–08
Colin Veitch	1908–09
Colin Veitch	1909–10

Notable records: captains 1890s

Captains	Season
1890s
William Graham	1892–93
William Graham	1893–94
William Graham	1894–95
Robert Foyers	1895–96
James Stott	1896–97
James Stott	1897–98
John Ostler	1898–99
Andy Aitken	1899–00

=== Outfield ===
==== Assists ====
===== Assists (streaks) =====
- **Consecutive assists in Premier League matches** – 4 consecutive games, Kieran Trippier, 21 October 2023.

===== Assists (most) =====
- **Most assists in a Premier League match** – 3, Allan Saint-Maximin, (v. Bournemouth, Premier League, 2019–20 squad, 1 July 2020) (Note: Record shared with numerous players)

Notable records: most Premier League assists in a match

**Bold** signifies current Newcastle United player.

Rank	Player	Detail	Assists
Assists in a Premier League match
1	Rob Lee	(v. Sheffield Wednesday, Premier League, 1993–94 squad, 13 September 1993)	3
1	Andy Cole	(v. West Ham, Premier League, 1993–94 squad, 19 March 1994)	3
1	Allan Saint-Maximin	(v. Bournemouth, Premier League, 2019–20 squad, 1 July 2020)	3
1	Kieran Trippier	(v. Sheffield United, Premier League, 2023–24 squad, 24 September 2023)	3

- **Most header assists in a Premier League match** – 3, Kieran Trippier, (v. Sheffield United, Premier League, 2023–24 squad, 24 September 2023)

- **Most assists in a Premier League season** – Nolberto Solano, 15 assists Premier League, 1999–00 squad

Notable records: Premier League assists in a season

**Bold** signifies current Newcastle United player.

Notable goal creating records from players in a season.

Rank	Player	Detail	Assists	Games	Rate
Assists in a Premier League season
1	Nolberto Solano	Premier League, 1999–00 squad	15	30	50%
2	Andy Cole	Premier League, 1993–94 squad	13	40	33%
3	**Jacob Murphy**	Premier League, 2024–25 squad	12	35	34%
4	Ruel Fox	Premier League, 1994–95 squad	11	40	28%
4	Laurent Robert	Premier League, 2001–02 squad	11	36	31%

Notable records: all-time Premier League assists

**Bold** signifies current Newcastle United player.

Rank	Player	Detail	Assists
Premier League assists
1	Nolberto Solano	Premier League, 1998–2007 squads	54
2	Alan Shearer	Premier League, 1996–2006 squads	36
3	Rob Lee	Premier League, 1993–2002 squads	31
4	**Jacob Murphy**	Premier League, 2017– squads	30
5	Laurent Robert	Premier League, 2001–2005 squads	29
6	Peter Beardsley	Premier League, 1993–1997 squads	26
6	Kieron Dyer	Premier League, 1999–2007 squads	26

===== Assists (age) =====
- **Youngest player to assist in a Premier League match** – **Lewis Miley**, 17 years 208 days (v. Chelsea, 25 November 2023)
- **Youngest player to assist in European competition** – **Lewis Miley**, 17 years 226 days (v. AC Milan, 13 December 2023)

==== Clean sheet involvements ====
Notable records: outfield players clean sheet involvements in a Premier League season

Notable clean sheet involvements over a Premier League season from outfield players

Rank	Player	Detail	CS
12 or more clean sheets in a Premier League season
1	Andy Cole	Premier League, 1993–94 squad	15
1	Jonas Gutierrez	Premier League, 2011–12 squad	15
3	Ruel Fox	Premier League, 1994–95 squad	14
3	Kieran Trippier	Premier League, 2022–23 squad	14
5	Peter Beardsley	Premier League, 1993–94 squad	13
5	Rob Lee	Premier League, 1993–94 squad	13
5	Les Ferdinand	Premier League, 1995–96 squad	13
5	Aaron Hughes	Premier League, 2002–03 squad	13
5	Fabricio Coloccini	Premier League, 2011–12 squad	13
5	Danny Simpson	Premier League, 2011–12 squad	13
5	Dan Burn	Premier League, 2024–25 squad	13
12	Peter Beardsley	Premier League, 1995–96 squad	12
12	Rob Lee	Premier League, 1995–96 squad	12
12	Alan Shearer	Premier League, 1999–00 squad	12
12	Gary Speed	Premier League, 1999–00 squad	12
12	Alan Shearer	Premier League, 2002–03 squad	12
12	Dan Burn	Premier League, 2022–23 squad	12
12	Fabian Schar	Premier League, 2022–23 squad	12

A snapshot, players who have been involved in many clean sheets, in a Premier League season. (Note: The Premier League and Opta defines a clean-sheet involvement as a full game played without the team conceding.)

Speed, Shearer, Jonás and many more outfield players have managed 12 or more clean sheet involvements in a Premier League season. Jonas Gutierrez was involved in 15 clean sheets in the 2011–12 season.

==== Goal scorers ====
===== Goals scorers (streaks) =====
- **Consecutive all competition matches scored** – 13 goals in 9 games, Willie Wardrope, (v. Crewe, Second Division, 1895–96 squad, 25 December 1895)

Notable records: consecutive all competition match scorers

**Bold** signifies current Newcastle United player.

Rank	Player	Detail	Goals	Games	Strike rate
Players who scored in consecutive games in all competitions
1	Willie Wardrope	(v. Crewe, Second Division, 1895–96 squad, 25 December 1895)	13	9	144%
2	Les Ferdinand	(v. Stoke, League Cup, 1995–96 squad, 25 October 1995)	12	8	150%

- **Consecutive Football League matches scored** – 11 goals in 8 games, Len White (v. Luton, First Division, 1957–58 squad, 29 March 1958)

Notable records: consecutive Football League match scorer records

Rank	Player	Detail	Goals	Games	Strike rate
Players who scored in consecutive games in the Football League
1	Len White	(v. Luton, First Division, 1957–58 squad, 29 March 1958) (Note: It is referenced as a 7 game run. Data shows White had an 8 game run.)	11	8	138%
2	Len White	(v. Aston Villa, First Division, 1960–61 squad, 25 February 1961)	9	7	129%
3	Paul Goddard	(v. Manchester United, First Division, 1986–87 squad, 18 April 1987)	7	7	100%
4	Willie Wardrope	(v. Crewe, Second Division, 1895–96 squad, 25 December 1895) (Note: 6 league games in 9 game all competition run.)	10	6	167%

- **Consecutive Premier League matches scored** – 11 goals in 8 games, Alexander Isak (v. Wolves, Premier League, 2024–25 squad, 15 January 2025)

Notable records: consecutive Premier League match scorer records

Consecutive goals in games records specifically in Premier League matches

By the 4 January 2025 only three footballers had scored in seven consecutive matches in the Premier League for Newcastle.

**Bold** signifies current Newcastle United player.

Rank	Player	Detail	Goals	Games	Strike rate
Players who scored in consecutive games in the Premier League
1	Alexander Isak	(v. Wolves, Premier League, 2024–25 squad, 15 January 2025)	11	8	138%
2	Alan Shearer	(v. Arsenal, Premier League, 1996–97 squad, 30 November 1996)	7	7	100%
2	**Joe Willock**	(v. Fulham, Premier League, 2020–21 squad, 23 May 2021)	7	7	100%
4	Papiss Cissé	(v. Stoke, Premier League, 2011–12 squad, 21 April 2012)	9	6	150%
5	Les Ferdinand	(v. Wimbledon, Premier League, 1995–96 squad, 21 October 1995) (Note: 5 league games in 8 game all competition run.)	9	5	180%

A notable record

Joe Willock matched a club goal scoring record whilst playing in midfield. In April 2021, his game time was also notably restricted in the matches against Spurs, West Ham and Liverpool. Willock coming off the bench in the three games, managed roughly 49 minutes and yet, he still scored consecutively.

Noting the form; the staff selected Willock to start in each of the remaining four matches of the season. It is noted on Willock's sixth game of the run, at the age of 21 years and 272 days Willock became the youngest player in Premier League and Newcastle United history to score in six consecutive Premier League matches.

On 23 May 2021, Willock scored a 7th goal on a 7-game run. At the age of 21, Willock matched a 24 years old goalscoring feat set by Alan Shearer.

- **Consecutive FA Cup rounds scored** – 8 goals in 6 rounds, Jackie Milburn, (v. Blackpool, FA Cup final, 1950–51 squad, 28 April 1951)
- **Consecutive goals scored in European games** – 4 goals in 3 games, Anthony Gordon (v. Benfica, UEFA Champions League, 2025–26 squad, 21 October 2025)

Notable records: consecutive goals scored in European games

**Bold** signifies current Newcastle United player.

Rank	Player	Detail	Goals	Games	Strike rate
Players who scored in consecutive games in a European campaign
1	**Anthony Gordon**	(v. Benfica, UEFA Champions League, 2025–26 squad, 21 October 2025)	4	3	133%
2	Bobby Moncur	(v. Újpesti Dózsa, Inter-Cities Fairs Cup final, 1968–69 squad, 11 June 1969)	3	2	150%
3	Patrick Kluivert	(v. Bnei Sakhnin, UEFA Cup, 2004–05 squad, 30 September 2004)	4	2	200%

- **Consecutive goals scored in opening European games of a campaign** – 4 goals in 3 games, Anthony Gordon (v. Benfica, UEFA Champions League, 2025–26 squad, 21 October 2025)

Notable records: consecutive goals scored in opening European games of a campaign

On 1 October 2025, only two players had scored in the first two games for Newcastle in a European campaign.

**Bold** signifies current Newcastle United player.

Rank	Player	Detail	Goals	Games	Strike rate
Players who scored in the opening game and then in consecutive games in a European campaign
1	**Anthony Gordon**	(v. Benfica, UEFA Champions League, 2025–26 squad, 21 October 2025)	4	3	133%
2	Patrick Kluivert	(v. Bnei Sakhnin, UEFA Cup, 2004–05 squad, 30 September 2004)	4	2	200%

- **Consecutive home Premier League matches scored** – 20 goals in 15 games, Alan Shearer (v. Nottingham Forest, Premier League, 1996–97 squad, 11 May 1997)

Notable records: consecutive Premier League home match scorers

Players who have scored in consecutive Premier League home games.

On 2 April 2024, only four Newcastle player had scored consecutively in five home Premier League games in a streak.

**Bold** signifies current Newcastle United player.

Rank	Player	Detail	Goals	Games	Strike rate
Players who scored in consecutive home goals in the Premier League
1	Alan Shearer	(v. Nottingham Forest, Premier League, 1996–97 squad, 11 May 1997)	20	15	133%
2	Andy Cole	(v. Coventry City, Premier League, 1993–94 squad, 23 February 1994)	13	8	163%
3	Les Ferdinand	(v. Liverpool, Premier League, 1995–96 squad, 4 November 1995)	10	6	167%
4	Alexander Isak	(v. Everton, Premier League, 2023–24 squad, 2 April 2024)	6	5	120%

- **Consecutive first Premier League home matches scored in after a home debut** – 20 goals in first 15 games (home debut – consecutive home game 15), Alan Shearer (v. Nottingham Forest, Premier League, 1996–97 squad, 11 May 1997)

Notable records: consecutive Premier League home matches scored in after a home debut

Players who have scored in consecutive Premier League home games from a home debut.

On 28 September 2025, only six players had scored in their first two home games for Newcastle in the Premier League. On 5 October 2025, only three players had scored in their first three home games for Newcastle in the Premier League.

**Bold** signifies current Newcastle United player.

Rank	Player	Detail	Goals	Games	Strike rate
Players who scored in first home game and consecutive home games in the Premier League
1	Alan Shearer	(v. Nottingham Forest, Premier League, 1996–97 squad, 11 May 1997)	20	15	133%
2	Les Ferdinand	(v. Liverpool, Premier League, 1995–96 squad, 4 November 1995)	10	6	167%
3	**Nick Woltemade**	(v. Nottingham Forest, Premier League, 2025–26 squad, 5 October 2025)	3	3	100%
4	Moussa Sissoko	(v. Southampton, Premier League, 2012–13 squad, 24 February 2013	3	2	150%
5	Daniel Cordone	(v. Tottenham Hotspur, Premier League, 2000–01 squad, 25 August 2000)	2	2	100%
6	Papiss Cissé	(v. Wolves, Premier League, 2011–12 squad, 25 February 2012)	2	2	100%

- **Consecutive away Premier League matches scored** – 8 goals in 5 games, Alexander Isak (v. Southampton, Premier League, 2024–25 squad, 25 January 2025)

===== Goals scorers (timing) =====
- **Fastest Premier League debut goal** – 6:00 minutes, **Sandro Tonali** (v. Aston Villa, Premier League, 2023–24 squad, 12 August 2023)

Notable records: fastest Premier League debut goal

On 12 August 2023 there were fourteen players who had scored on their debut in the Premier League. This number moved to fifteen on 13 September 2025.

Rank	Player	Detail	Time
Fastest Premier League debut goal scored records
1	**Sandro Tonali**	(v. Aston Villa, Premier League, 2023–24 squad, 12 August 2023)	6:00
2	**Joe Willock**	(v. Southampton, Premier League, 2020–21 squad, 6 February 2021)	16:00
3	Alex Mathie	(v. Sheffield Wednesday, Premier League, 1993–94 squad, 13 September 1993) (Note: Debuted as substitute)	19:00
4	**Harvey Barnes**	(v. Aston Villa, Premier League, 2023–24 squad, 12 August 2023)	23:00
5	Stéphane Guivarc'h	(v. Liverpool, Premier League, 1998–99 squad, 30 August 1998)	28:00
6	**Nick Woltemade**	(v. Wolves, Premier League, 2025–26 squad, 13 September 2025)	29:00
7	Alexander Isak	(v. Liverpool,Premier League, 2022–23 squad, 31 August 2022)	38:00
8	Georginio Wijnaldum	(v. Southampton, Premier League, 2015–16 squad, 9 August 2015)	48:00
9	Callum Wilson	(v. West Ham,Premier League, 2020–21 squad, 12 September 2020)	56:00
10	Papiss Cissé	(v. Aston Villa, Premier League, 2011–12 squad, 5 February 2012)	57:00
11	Duncan Ferguson	(v. Wimbledon, Premier League, 1998–99 squad, 28 November 1998)	59:00
12	Matty Longstaff	(v. Manchester United, Premier League, 2019–20 squad, 6 October 2019)	72:00
13	Xisco	(v. Hull City, Premier League, 2008–09 squad, 13 September 2008)	82:00
14	Les Ferdinand	(v. Coventry City, Premier League, 1995–96 squad, 19 August 1995)	83:00
15	Jeff Hendrick	(v. West Ham, Premier League, 2020–21 squad, 12 September 2020)	87:00

- **Fastest recorded goal** – 0:10.4 seconds, Alan Shearer (v. Manchester City, Premier League, 2002–03 squad, 18 January 2003) (Note: Milburn scored a 6 second goal on 22 November 1947 v. Cardiff City. This Jackie Milburn effort is not noted as an official time. Malcolm Macdonald lobbed the keeper from kick off in a preseason friendly on 29 July 1972.)

Notable records: fastest goal scorer in all competitions

**Bold** signifies current Newcastle United player.

Player	Detail	Time
Fastest all competitions goal scored records
Malcolm Macdonald	(v. St Johnstone, friendly match, 1972–73 squad, 29 July 1972)	0:04
Jackie Milburn	(v. Cardiff City, Second Division, 1947–48 squad, 22 November 1947)	0:06
Alan Shearer	(v. Manchester City, Premier League, 2002–03 squad, 18 January 2003)	0:10.4
Miguel Almiron	(v. West Brom, Premier League, 2020–21 squad, 12 December 2020)	0:19.98
Jackie Milburn	(v. Manchester City, FA Cup final, 1955 squad, 7 May 1955)	0:45
Anthony Gordon	(v. Qarabağ, UEFA Champions League, 2025–26 squad, 18 February 2026)	2:02

- **Fastest recorded FA Cup final goal** – 0:45 seconds, Jackie Milburn (v. Manchester City, FA Cup final, 1955 squad, 7 May 1955)
- **Fastest goal in the UEFA Champions League** – 2:02 minutes, Anthony Gordon (v. Qarabağ, UEFA Champions League, 2025–26 squad, 18 February 2026)
- **Fastest recorded Premier League goal** – 0:10.4 seconds, Alan Shearer (v. Manchester City, Premier League, 2002–03 squad, 18 January 2003)

Notable records: fastest Premier League goal scorer

**Bold** signifies current Newcastle United player.

Rank	Player	Detail	Time
Fastest Premier League goal scored records
1	Alan Shearer	(v. Manchester City, Premier League, 2002–03 squad, 18 January 2003)	0:10.4
2	Miguel Almiron	(v. West Brom, Premier League, 2020–21 squad, 12 December 2020)	0:19.98
-	**Malick Thiaw**	(v. Everton, Premier League, 2025–26 squad, 29 November 2025)	0:55

- **Earliest to complete a hattrick specifically in a Premier League game** – 3 in first 30 minutes, Andy Cole (v. Liverpool, Premier League, 1993–94 squad, 21 November 1993) (Note: Earliest; kick off to third goal)
- **Earliest to complete a hattrick specifically in a UEFA Champions League game** – 3 in first 33 minutes, Anthony Gordon (v. Qarabağ, UEFA Champions League, 2025–26 squad, 18 February 2026)

Notable records: Earliest UEFA Champions League hattricks

Earliest UEFA Champions League Hattricks scored as cited from reliable databases and the literature

By February 2026 only Tino Asprilla, Alan Shearer and Anthony Gordon had scored a hattrick for Newcastle in the UEFA Champions League. All three players have held the record for the earliest hattrick in the UEFA Champions League, with Anthony Gordon breaking a 22 years and 357 days old Shearer record on 18 February 2026.

Rank	Player	Detail	Earliest
Earliest hattricks scored in the UEFA Champions league
1	Anthony Gordon	(v. Qarabağ, UEFA Champions League, 2025–26 squad, 18 February 2026)	33:00
2	Alan Shearer	(v. Bayer Leverkuseny, UEFA Champions League, 2002–03 squad, 26 February 2003)	36:00
3	Faustino Asprilla	(v Barcelona, UEFA Champions League, 1997–98 squad, 17 September 1997)	49:00

- **Fastest to score 50 goals in all competitions** – 50, Andy Cole(1993–1995 squads)

Notable records: games taken to reach first 50 goals in all competition

**Bold** signifies current Newcastle United player.

Rank	Player	Detail	Games
Games taken to reach 50 goals in all competitions
1	Andy Cole	1993–1995 squads	50
2	Les Ferdinand	1995–1997 squads	84
3	Alexander Isak	2022–2025 squads	89
4	Alan Shearer	1996–2006 squads	94

- **Latest winning goal scored in a Premier League match** – 101:48 minutes, **Harvey Barnes** (v. Leeds United, Premier League, 2025–26 squad, 7 January 2026)

Notable records: latest Premier League goal scorers

**Bold** signifies current Newcastle United player.

Rank	Player	Detail	Time
Latest Premier League goal scored records
1	**Harvey Barnes**	(v. Leeds United, Premier League, 2025–26 squad, 7 January 2026)	101:48
2	Callum Wilson	(v. Spurs, Premier League, 2020–21 squad, 27 September 2020)	97:00
3	**Bruno Guimarães**	(v. Leicester City, Premier League, 2021–22 squad, 17 April 2022)	95:00
4	**Joe Willock**	(v. Liverpool, Premier League, 2020–21 squad, 24 April 2021)	95:00
5	Florian Lejeune	(v. Everton, Premier League, 2019–20 squad, 21 January 2020)	95:00
6	Yohan Cabaye	(v. West Ham, Premier League, 2013–14 squad, 18 January 2014)	95:00

===== Goal scorers (firsts) =====
- **First to score on both Premier League and Champions League debuts** – 1 goal in each match, **Nick Woltemade** (v. Wolves, Premier League, 13 September 2025; v. Union St. Gilloise, UEFA Champions League, 1 October 2025)
- **First player to score consecutively in 15 Premier League home matches** – 20 goals in 15 game streak, Alan Shearer (v. Nottingham Forest, Premier League, 11 May 1997)

Notable records: first players who scored in consecutive home Premier League matches

The first players to score in consecutive Premier League home matches.

Malcolm Allen was the first player to score for Newcastle in the Premier League when he scored for Newcastle at home against Everton on 25 August 1993. In the same season, Andy Cole became the first Newcastle player to complete an eight home Premier League scoring streak in a match against Coventry City on the 23 February 1994.

See also: 1993–94 Premier League season

Alan Shearer beat Cole's consecutive eight game scoring record in the 1996–97 Premier League season. In this season, Shearer became the first Newcastle player to score consecutively in nine home Premier League games, in a match against Leeds United on 1 January 1997. Shearer continued his goalscoring streak and reached a fifteenth consecutive match; scoring in a home match against Nottingham Forest on 11 May 1997.

See also: 1996–97 Premier League season

Rank	Player	Goals	Matches	Detail
1	Alan Shearer	20	15	(v. Nottingham Forest, Premier League, 11 May 1997)
7	Alan Shearer	11	9	(v. Leeds United,Premier League, 1 January 1997)
8	Andy Cole	13	8	(v. Coventry City, Premier League, 23 February 1994)
15	Malcolm Allen	1	1	(v. Everton, Premier League, 25 August 1993)

- **First player to score consecutively in his first fifteen Premier League home appearances in debut season** – 20 goals in 15 consecutive home games, Alan Shearer (v. Nottingham Forest, Premier League, 11 May 1997)

Notable records: first players who scored in consecutive home Premier League matches following a home debut

The first players to score on a home debut and then score in consecutive home matches.

Alex Mathie was the first player to score for Newcastle on his home debut in the Premier League when he came off the bench to score for Newcastle against Sheffield Wednesday on 13 September 1993. Though Mathie failed to score in a second consecutive home game in a streak. Les Ferdinand was the first to have a Premier League home goals-games streak from his home debut. Ferdinand. became the first Newcastle player to score in six consecutive home Premier League games after his home debut in the 1995–96 Premier League season when he scored against Liverpool on 4 November 1995.

See also: 1995–96 Premier League season

Alan Shearer beat Ferdinand's record in the following 1996–97 Premier League season. In this season, Shearer became the first Newcastle player to score consecutively in seven home Premier League games from a home debut, in a match against Liverpool on 23 December 1996. Shearer continued his goalscoring streak and reached a fifteenth consecutive match; scoring in a home match against Nottingham Forest on 11 May 1997.

See also: 1996–97 Premier League season

Rank	Player	Goals	Matches	Detail
1	Alan Shearer	20	15	(v. Nottingham Forest, Premier League, 11 May 1997)
9	Alan Shearer	7	7	(v. Liverpool,Premier League, 23 December 1996)
10	Les Ferdinand	10	6	(v. Liverpool, Premier League, 4 November 1995)
13	Les Ferdinand	4	3	(v. Man City, Premier League, 16 September 1995)
14	Les Ferdinand	2	2	(v. Middlesbrough, Premier League, 30 August 1995)
15	Alex Mathie	1	1	(v. Sheffield Wednesday,Premier League, 13 September 1993)

- **First player to score goals in first two consecutive opening games of UEFA Cup campaign** – 4 goals in 2 games, Patrick Kluivert (v. Bnei Sakhnin, UEFA Cup, 30 September 2005)
- **First player to score goals in first three consecutive opening games of UEFA Champions League campaign** – 4 goals in 3 games, **Anthony Gordon** (v. Benfica, UEFA Champions League, 21 October 2025)

Notable records: first players who scored in the first and consecutive matches of a UEFA Champions League campaign

The first players to score in the first and then consecutive matches of a UEFA Champions League campaign.

John Beresford was the first Newcastle player to score in the first game of the 1997–98 UEFA Champions League campaign, when he scored two for Newcastle at home against Croatia Zagreb

See also: 1997–98 Champions League campaign

Rank	Player	Goals	Matches	Detail
1	**Anthony Gordon**	4	3	(v. Benfica, UEFA Champions League, 21 October 2025)
2	**Anthony Gordon**	3	2	(v. Union St. Gilloise, UEFA Champions League, 1 October 2025)
3	John Beresford	2	1	(v. Croatia Zagreb, UEFA Champions League, 13 August 1997)

- **First player to score goals in three consecutive UEFA Champions League games** – 4 goals in 3 games, **Anthony Gordon** (v. Benfica, UEFA Champions League, 21 October 2025)
- **First player to score double figure goals specifically in a UEFA Champions League campaign** – 10, Anthony Gordon (v. Qarabağ, UEFA Champions League, 2025–26 squad, 18 February 2026)
- **First player to score 4 goals specifically in a UEFA Champions League game** – 4 goals, Anthony Gordon (v. Qarabağ, UEFA Champions League, 2025–26 squad, 18 February 2026)

Notable records:first players to score 1 or more goals in a UEFA Champions League match

First players to score 1 or more goals in a Champions League match

Rank	Player	Detail	Goals
UEFA Champions League match, goals scored firsts
1	Anthony Gordon	(v. Qarabağ, UEFA Champions League, 2025–26 squad, 18 February 2026)	4
2	Faustino Asprilla	(v Barcelona, UEFA Champions League, 1997–98 squad, 17 September 1997)	3
3	John Beresford	(v. Croatia Zagreb, UEFA Champions League, 1997–98 squad, 13 August 1997)	2
4	John Beresford	(v. Croatia Zagreb, UEFA Champions League, 1997–98 squad, 13 August 1997)	1

- **First player to score 4 goals in the first half of a UEFA Champions League game** – 4, Anthony Gordon (v. Qarabağ, UEFA Champions League, 2025–26 squad, 18 February 2026)

- **First player to score 10+ home and 10+ away goals in a Premier League season** – 22 home, 12 away, Andy Cole(1993–94)
- **First player to score in every round of the FA Cup and win the FA Cup** – 6 rounds, Jackie Milburn (1951 FA Cup)
- **First player to score directly from a corner in the Premier League** – **Bruno Guimarães** (v. Burnley, Premier League, 6 December 2025) (Note: The keeper did not touch the ball; the goal is also defined as an Olimpico goal)
- **First player to score from a throw-in** – Malcolm Macdonald (v. Notts County, Quarter-Final of League Cup, 3 December 1975) (Note: A goal cannot be scored directly from a throw-in. A goal counted; McManus touched the ball before it crossed the line.)

===== Goals scorers (most) =====
- **Most all competition goals in a season** – 41, Andy Cole (All competitions, 1993–94 squad)
- **Most Football League goals in a season** – 36, Hughie Gallacher (Football League, 1926–27 squad)
- **Most top-flight goals, from a non-UK born player, in a season** – 33, George Robledo (Football League, 1951–52 squad)
- **Most Premier League goals in a season** – 34, Andy Cole (Premier League, 1993–94 squad)

Notable records: top scorers in a Premier League campaign

Rank	Player	Detail	Goals	Games	Strike rate
Premier League season goal scoring records
1	Andy Cole	Premier League, 1993–94 squad	34	40	85%
2	Alan Shearer	Premier League, 1996–97 squad	25	31	81%
3	Les Ferdinand	Premier League, 1995–96 squad	25	37	68%
4	Alexander Isak	Premier League, 2024–25 squad	23	34	68%
5	Alan Shearer	Premier League, 2001–02 squad	23	37	62%
6	Alan Shearer	Premier League, 1999–00 squad	23	37	62%
7	Alan Shearer	Premier League, 2003–04 squad	22	37	59%
8	Alexander Isak	Premier League, 2023–24 squad	21	30	70%
9	Peter Beardsley	Premier League, 1993–94 squad	21	35	60%
10	Callum Wilson	Premier League, 2022–23 squad	18	31	58%

- **Most different matches scored in, in a Premier League campaign** – 26 matches, Andy Cole (Premier League, 1993–94 squad).
- **Most goals when scoring 10+ home and 10+ away goals in a Premier League season** – 22 home, 12 away (34 goals), Andy Cole (Premier League, 1993–94 squad)

Notable records: players with 10+ home and 10+ away goals in a Premier League season

Players with 10+ home and 10+ away goals in a season.

On 2 April 2025, only three players had scored 10+ home and 10+ away goals in a Premier League campaign.

**Bold** signifies current Newcastle United player.

Player	Detail
Players with 10+ home and 10+ away goals in campaign
Andy Cole	Premier League, 1993–94 squad
Alan Shearer	Premier League, 2001–02 squad
Alexander Isak	Premier League, 2024–25 squad

- **Most direct free-kick goals in a Premier League season** – 5 goals, Laurent Robert (Premier League, 2001–02 squad)
- **Most goals specifically in a UEFA Champions League campaign** – 10 goals in 9 games, Anthony Gordon (v. Qarabağ, UEFA Champions League, 2025–26 squad, 18 February 2026)

Notable records: top scorers in a UEFA Champions League campaign

Top scorers in a Champions League campaign

On 21 January 2026 in a game against PSV, Anthony Gordon equalled Alan Shearer's record with a 86% strike rate. On 18 February, Gordon broke the record with a 111% strike rate.

Rank	Player	Detail	Goals	Games	Strike rate
UEFA Champions League campaign goal scoring records
1	Anthony Gordon	(v. Qarabağ, UEFA Champions League, 2025–26 squad, 18 February 2026)	10	9	111%
2	Alan Shearer	(v Internazionale, UEFA Champions League, 2002–03 squad, 11 March 2003) (Note: Two games played 3rd round qualifiers.)	6	12	50%
3	Harvey Barnes	(v. PSV, UEFA Champions League, 2025–26 squad, 21 January 2026)	5	7	71%

- **Most Premier League goals scored in a calendar year** – 27 goals in 2002, Alan Shearer (v. Spurs, Premier League, 2002–03 squad, 29 December 2002)

Notable records: Most Premier League goals scored in a calendar year

Most Premier League goals scored in a calendar year

On 31 December 2024, only two players had scored more than twenty-four goals in a calendar year in the Premier League.

Rank	Player	Detail	Goals	Games	Strike Rate	Period
Record goals scored in a calendar month in the Premier League
1	Alan Shearer	(v. Spurs, Premier League, 2002–03 squad, 29 December 2002)	27	–	–	2002
2	Alexander Isak	(v. Man Utd, Premier League, 2024–24 squad, 30 December 2024)	25	–	–	2024

- **Most Premier League goals scored in a calendar month** – 8 goals in 7 games in April 2023, Callum Wilson (v. Southampton, Premier League, 2022–23 squad, 30 April 2023)

Notable records: Most Premier League goals scored in a calendar month

Most Premier League goals scored in a calendar month

On 30 April 2023, only two players had scored more than six goals in a calendar month in the Premier League.

Rank	Player	Detail	Goals	Games	Strike rate	Period
Record goals scored in a calendar month in the Premier League
1	Callum Wilson	(v. Southampton, Premier League, 2022–23 squad, 30 April 2023)	8	7	114%	April–2023
2	Alan Shearer	(v. Leeds United, Premier League, 1999–00 squad, 25 September 1999)	7	3	233%	September–1999

- **Most goals in a single Football League match** – 6, Len Shackleton (v. Newport County, Football League, 1946–47 squad, 5 October 1946)
- **Most goals in a single Premier League match** – 5, Alan Shearer (v. Sheffield Wednesday, Premier League, 1999–00 squad, 19 September 1999)

Notable records: most Premier League goals scored in a single match

Rank	Player	Detail	Goals
Records of most goals scored in Premier League match
1	Alan Shearer	(v. Sheffield Wednesday, Premier League, 1999–00 squad, 19 September 1999)	5
2	Georginio Wijnaldum	(v. Norwich City, Premier League, 2015–16 squad, 18 October 2015)	4
3	Peter Beardsley	(v. Wimbledon,Premier League, 1993–94 squad, 30 October 1993)	3
4	Andy Cole	(v. Liverpool, Premier League, 1993–94 squad, 21 November 1993	3
5	Andy Cole	(v. Coventry City, Premier League, 1993–94 squad, 23 February 1994	3
6	Les Ferdinand	(v. Wimbledon, Premier League, 1995–96 squad, 21 October 1995	3
7	Alan Shearer	(v. Leicester City, Premier League, 1996–97 squad, 2 February 1997	3
8	Michael Owen	(v. West Ham United, Premier League, 2005–06 squad, 17 December 2005	3
9	Andy Carroll	(v. Aston Villa, Premier League, 2010–11 squad, 22 August 2010	3
10	Kevin Nolan	(v. Sunderland, Premier League, 2010–11 squad, 31 October 2010	3
11	Leon Best	(v. West Ham United, Premier League, 2010–11 squad, 5 January 2011	3
12	Demba Ba	(v. Blackburn Rovers, Premier League, 2011–12 squad, 24 September 2011	3
13	Demba Ba	(v. Stoke City, Premier League, 2011–12 squad, 31 October 2011	3
14	Ayoze Pérez	(v. Southampton, Premier League, 2018–19 squad, 20 April 2019	3
15	Alexander Isak	(v. Ipswich Town, Premier League, 2024–25 squad, 21 December 2024	3

- **Most hat-tricks in Premier League** – 2, Andy Cole (Premier League, 1993–1995 squads)

Notable records: most Premier League hat-tricks

Rank	Player	Detail	Hat-tricks
Number of hat-tricks scored in Premier League
1	Andy Cole	Premier League, 1993–1995 squads	2
1	Alan Shearer	Premier League, 1996–2006 squads	2
1	Demba Ba	Premier League, 2011–2013 squads	2

- **Most goals in a single UEFA Champions League game** – 4, Anthony Gordon (v. Qarabağ, UEFA Champions League, 2025–26 squad, 18 February 2026)

Notable records:most goals in a UEFA Champions League match

Most goals in a single UEFA Champions League match

Rank	Player	Detail	Goals
Most goals in a UEFA Champions League match
1	Anthony Gordon	(v. Qarabağ, UEFA Champions League, 2025–26 squad, 18 February 2026)	4
2	Faustino Asprilla	(v Barcelona, UEFA Champions League, 1997–98 squad, 17 September 1997)	3
2	Alan Shearer	(v. Bayer Leverkusen, UEFA Champions League, 2002–03 squad, 26 February 2003)	3

- **Most goals scored in the first half in a UEFA Champions League game** – 4, Anthony Gordon (v. Qarabağ, UEFA Champions League, 2025–26 squad, 18 February 2026)

- **Most goals in all competitions** – 206, Alan Shearer (all competitions, 1996–2006 squads)
  - **Current player with most goals** – 31, **Joelinton** (as of 1 October 2025)

Notable records: top scorers in all competitions

Rank	Player	Detail	Goals	Games	Strike rate
Records of all competition top goal scorers
1	Alan Shearer	All competitions, 1996–2006 squads	206	405	51%
2	Jackie Milburn	All competitions, 1943–1957 squads (Note: Milburn scored 238 post 1943 and 200 post 1945)	200	397	50%
3	Len White	All competitions, 1953–1962 squads	153	270	57%
4	Hughie Gallacher	All competitions, 1925–1930 squads	143	174	82%
5	Malcolm Macdonald	All competitions, 1971–1976 squads	121	228	53%
6	Peter Beardsley	All competitions, 1983–1997 squads	119	326	37%
7	Tommy McDonald	All competitions, 1921–1931 squads	113	367	31%
8	Bobby Mitchell	All competitions, 1949–1961 squads	113	410	28%
9	Neil Harris	All competitions, 1920–1925 squads	101	194	52%
10	Pop Robson	All competitions, 1962–1971 squads	97	244	40%

- **Highest career strike rate in all competitions** – 82% (143 goals in 174 games), Hughie Gallacher (all competitions, 1925–1930 squads)

Notable records: Highest career strike rates of players in all competitions

Notable strike rates of players who played more than 75 games in all competitions

Players who played more than 75 games in all competitions, who attained strike rates over 50% for Newcastle.

Rank	Player	Detail	Goals	Games	Strike rate
Record career strike rates in players who played more than 75 games
1	Hughie Gallacher	All competitions, 1925–1930 squads	143	174	82%
2	Andy Cole	All competitions, 1993–1995 squads	68	84	81%
3	Albert Shepherd	All competitions, 1908–1914 squads	92	123	75%
4	Jack Smith	All competitions, 1934–1938 squads	73	112	65%
5	Barrie Thomas	All competitions, 1962–1964 squads	50	78	64%
6	Bill Appleyard	All competitions, 1902–1908 squads	87	145	60%
6	Les Ferdinand	All competitions, 1995–1997 squads	50	83	60%
8	Len White	All competitions, 1953–1962 squads	153	270	57%
9	Malcolm Macdonald	All competitions, 1971–1976 squads	121	228	53%
10	Neil Harris	All competitions, 1920–1925 squads	101	194	52%
11	Alan Shearer	All competitions, 1996–2006 squads	206	404	51%
12	Jackie Milburn	All competitions, 1945–1957 squads	200	397	50%

- **Most goals in the Football League** – 178, Jackie Milburn (Football League, 1945–1957 squads)
- **Most goals in European competition** – 30 in 52 matches, Alan Shearer (All European competitions, 1996–2006 squads)

===== Goals scorers (age) =====
- **Youngest player to score in a UEFA Champions League match** – **Lewis Miley**, 19 years and 223 days (v. Bayer Leverkusen, UEFA Champions League, 2025–26 squad, 10 December 2025)
- **Youngest player to score in 6 consecutive Premier League games** – **Joe Willock**, 21 years and 272 days, 6 goals in 6 games (v. Sheffield United, Premier League, 2020–21 squad, 19 May 2021)
- **Youngest player to score in a Premier League match** – **Lewis Miley**, 17 years and 229 days (v. Fulham, Premier League, 2023–24 squad, 16 December 2023)
- **Youngest player to score on Premier League debut** – Matty Longstaff, 19 years and 199 days (v. Manchester United, Premier League, 2019–20 squad, 6 October 2019)

=== Goalkeeping ===
==== Clean sheets ====
===== Clean sheets (streaks) =====
- **Most consecutive clean sheets in all competitions** – 10 games, Nick Pope, (v. Southampton, Carabao Cup, 2022–23 squad, 24 January 2023)

- **Most consecutive clean sheets in Premier League** – 6 games, Nick Pope (v Crystal Palace, Premier League, 2022–23 squad, 21 January 2023) (Note: 6 league games in 10 game all competition run)
- **Most consecutive clean sheets in Football League** – 6 games, Kevin Carr (v. Charlton Athletic, Football League, 1981–82 squad, 3 April 1982)

Notable records: consecutive clean sheets

Consecutive clean sheet records by goalkeepers

**Bold** signifies current Newcastle United player.

Rank	Player	Detail	Clean sheets
Goal keepers who, in all competitions, kept consecutive clean sheets
1	**Nick Pope**	(v. Southampton, All competitions, 2022–23 squad, 24 January 2023)	10
2	Kevin Carr	(v. Charlton Athletic, Football League, 1981–82 squad, 3 April 1982)	6
2	**Nick Pope**	(v Crystal Palace, Premier League, 2022–23 squad, 21 January 2023)	6
4	Steve Harper	(v. Cardiff City, Championship, 2009–10 squad, 13 September 2009)	5
5	**Nick Pope**	(v. Southampton, Carabao Cup, 2022–23 squad, 24 January 2023) (Note: 4 cup games in 10 game all competition run)	4

Carr's record

Kevin Carr created a six-game consecutive clean sheet, all competition and Football League, record on 3 April 1982. On Carr's run, eight players in front of him: John Brownlie, Wes Saunders, John Trewick, Steve Carney, Mick Martin, Imre Varadi, Peter Cartwright and Chris Waddle had six clean sheet game involvements as a team. Carr's most impressive game on the run was reported as a match against Oldham whereby, he made three incredible saves.

Records from 2023

Nick Pope equalled Kevin Carr's all competition record in a match against Arsenal on the 3 January 2023, and broke Carr's 40 years and 282 days old record in a match against Leicester City on 10 January 2023. Pope completed 10 consecutive games, in all competitions, without conceding a goal, whilst also setting a club Premier League record of six games without conceding a goal.

Like Carr, Pope was backed up by players playing in front of him. In the consecutive games, midfielder Joelinton also played in every minute; gaining ten all competition clean sheet involvements. Whilst in the Premier League only Trippier, Burn, Schar and Joelinton managed six full game clean sheet involvements in Pope's run.

Pope's six Premier League game clean sheets also played a part in a squad goals conceded record that was set in the 2022–23 season.

===== Clean sheets (most) =====
Notable records: all time Premier League clean sheets

**Bold** signifies current Newcastle United player.

Rank	Player	PL tenure	Clean sheets
1	Shay Given	1997–2009	89
2	Martin Dúbravka	2018–2025	46
3	Tim Krul	2006–2017	41
4	Pavel Srníček	1993–2007	35
5	**Nick Pope**	2022–	31
6	Steve Harper	1993–2013	23

Table last updated: 9 June 2025

==== Goalkeeping assists ====
===== Goalkeeping assists (firsts) =====
- **First goalkeeping assist in UEFA Champions League** – Nick Pope (v. Benfica, UEFA Champions League, 21 October 2025)

===== Goalkeeping assists (most) =====
- **Most goalkeeping assists in Premier League** – 2, Shay Given

Notable records: Most goalkeeping assists in the Premier League

Assists from goalkeepers who played for Newcastle United in the Premier League.

Rank	Player	Detail	Assists	Games	Average
1	Shay Given	Premier League	2	354	-
2	Shaka Hislop	Premier League	1	53	-
2	Tim Krul	Premier League	1	160	-
2	Rob Elliot	Premier League	1	55	-

- **Most goalkeeping assists in UEFA Champions League** – 1, Nick Pope (v. Benfica, UEFA Champions League, 21 October 2025)

===== Goalkeeping assists (streaks) =====
- **Consecutive goalkeeping assists in Premier League matches** – 2 assists in 2 matches, Shay Given (v. Nottingham forest, Premier League, 26 September 1998)

==== Saves ====
- **Most saves in a single match** – 14, Tim Krul, 10 November 2013.
- **Most saves with a Premier League clean sheet** – 14, Tim Krul, (v. Spurs, Premier League, 10 November 2013)
- **Most saves with a Premier League win** – 14, Tim Krul, (v. Spurs, Premier League, 10 November 2013)

Notable records: Premier League penalty saves

**Bold** signifies current Newcastle United player.

Rank	Player	PL tenure	Penalty saves (Note: The data on penalty saves, from the premierleague.com database, started in 2008. It is noted this data does not hold the penalty saving records of players like Pavel Srníček, Shay Given and Steve Harper who played in the league before the 2008-09 season.)
1	**Nick Pope**	2022–	3
2	Martin Dúbravka	2018–2025	2
2	Karl Darlow	2014–2023	2
2	Tim Krul	2006–2017	2

Table last updated: 9 June 2025

== Personal honours ==
=== English Football Hall of Fame ===
The following have either played for or managed Newcastle United and have been inducted into the English Football Hall of Fame :

Players

- (England) Paul Gascoigne (2002 inaugural inductee)
- (England) Kevin Keegan (2002 inaugural inductee)
- (England) Alan Shearer (2004 inductee)
- (England) John Barnes (2005 inductee)
- (England) Jackie Milburn (2006 inductee)
- (Wales) Ian Rush (2006 inductee)
- (England) Peter Beardsley (2007 inductee)
- (England) Len Shackleton (2009 inductee)
- (England) Stuart Pearce (2015 inductee)
- (Scotland) Hughie Gallacher (2014 inductee)
- (Wales) Gary Speed (2017 inductee)
- (Wales) Ivor Allchurch (2015 inductee)

Managers

- (England) Sir Bobby Robson (2003 inductee)

Football Foundation Community Champion

- (England) Peter Beardsley (2008 inductee)

=== Scottish Football Hall of Fame ===
The following have either played for or managed Newcastle United and have been inducted into the Scottish Football Hall of Fame :

Players

- (Scotland) Hughie Gallacher (2004 inaugural inductee)

Managers

- (Scotland) Kenny Dalglish (2004 inaugural inductee)
- (Scotland) Graeme Souness (2004 inaugural inductee)

=== Welsh Sports Hall of Fame ===
The following have played for Newcastle United and have been inducted into the Welsh Sports Hall of Fame : Players

- (Wales) Ivor Allchurch (1995 inductee)
- (Wales) Ian Rush (2001 inductee)

=== European Hall of Fame ===
The following have played for Newcastle United and have been inducted into the European Hall of Fame:

Players

- (England) Kevin Keegan
- (England) Alan Shearer
- (England) Peter Beardsley

Managers

- (England) Sir Bobby Robson

=== Football League 100 Legends ===
The following have played for Newcastle United and were included in the Football League 100 Legends :

- (England) John Barnes
- (England) Paul Gascoigne
- (England) Kevin Keegan
- (England) Malcolm Macdonald
- (England) Jackie Milburn
- (England) Len Shackleton
- (England) Alan Shearer
- (Ireland) Bill McCracken
- (Scotland) Hughie Gallacher
- (Wales) Ivor Allchurch
- (Wales) Ian Rush

=== PFA Players' Player of the Year ===
The following have won the PFA Players' Player of the Year award while playing for Newcastle United :

- 1996 (England) Les Ferdinand
- 1997 (England) Alan Shearer

=== PFA Young Player of the Year ===
The following have won the PFA Young Player of the Year award while playing for Newcastle United :

- 1988 (England) Paul Gascoigne
- 1994 (England) Andy Cole
- 2002 (Wales) Craig Bellamy
- 2003 (England) Jermaine Jenas

=== PFA Team of the Year ===
The following have been included in the PFA Team of the Year while playing for Newcastle United :

- 1973–74 First Division (England) Malcolm Macdonald
- 1978–79 Second Division (England) Peter Withe
- 1979–80 Second Division (England) Peter Withe
- 1982–83 Second Division (England) Kevin Keegan
- 1983–84 Second Division (England) Kevin Keegan
- 1984–85 First Division (England) Chris Waddle
- 1986–87 First Division (England) Peter Beardsley
- 1987–88 First Division (England) Paul Gascoigne
- 1989–90 Second Division (England) Micky Quinn
- 1992–93 First Division (England) John Beresford, (England) Lee Clark, (England) Gavin Peacock
- 1993–94 Premier League (England) Peter Beardsley
- 1995–96 Premier League (England) Rob Lee, (England) Les Ferdinand, (France) David Ginola
- 1996–97 Premier League (England) David Batty, (England) Alan Shearer
- 1997–98 Premier League (England) David Batty
- 2001–02 Premier League (Republic of Ireland) Shay Given
- 2002–03 Premier League (England) Kieron Dyer, (England) Alan Shearer
- 2005–06 Premier League (Republic of Ireland) Shay Given
- 2009–10 Championship (Argentina) Fabricio Coloccini, (Spain) Jose Enrique, (England) Kevin Nolan, (England) Andy Carroll
- 2011–12 Premier League (Argentina) Fabricio Coloccini
- 2016–17 Championship (England) Jamaal Lascelles, (England) Jonjo Shelvey, (England) Dwight Gayle
- 2022–23 Premier League (England) Kieran Trippier
- 2024–25 Premier League (Sweden) Alexander Isak

=== Premier League Golden Boot ===
The following have won the Premier League Golden Boot award while playing for Newcastle United :

- 1994 (England) Andy Cole
- 1997 (England) Alan Shearer

=== Premier League Manager of the Season ===
The following have won the Premier League Manager of the Season award while managing for Newcastle United :

- 2012 (England) Alan Pardew

=== Premier League LMA Manager of the Year ===
The following have won the LMA Manager of the Year award while managing for Newcastle United :

- 2012 (England) Alan Pardew

== Sources ==
=== Books ===
- Bolam, Mike (2012). The Newcastle Miscellany. United Kingdom: Vision Sports Publishing. ISBN 978-1-907637-74-2.

=== Databases ===
- 11v11 (28 May 2025). "Players for Newcastle in Premier League". 11v11.com.
- PL (25 May 2025). "Premier League Player Stats". premierleague.com.
- Scott, Kenneth H. (3 February 2026). "Newcastle United: Players". toon1892.com.

=== Websites ===
- NUFC Captains (11 June 2025). "Newcastle United captains". nufc-history.co.uk.
- Scott, Kenneth H. (25 September 2025). "A First For Firsts…". toon1892.com. Archived from the original on 25 September 2025.
