= 1995–96 Newcastle United F.C. season =

Newcastle United
1995–96 season
- Chairman: Sir John Hall
- Manager: Kevin Keegan
- Stadium: St James' Park
- Premier League: 2nd
- FA Cup: Third round
- League Cup: Quarter-finals
- Top goalscorer: League: Les Ferdinand (25); All: Les Ferdinand (29)
- Highest home attendance: 36,589 (vs. Tottenham Hotspur)
- Lowest home attendance: 36,225 (vs. Chelsea)
- Average home league attendance: 36,506
Home colours	Away colours

During the 1995–96 FA Premier League season, English club Newcastle United participated in the Premier League, finishing in second place; their best finish to date.

== Season summary ==
The 1995–96 season saw Sir John Hall's millions allow Newcastle to invest heavily in players from across the world. With a total of some £16 million spent on the signings of Les Ferdinand, David Ginola, Warren Barton and Shaka Hislop before the start of the season, Kevin Keegan's team made a strong start. Colombian striker Faustino Asprilla and England midfielder David Batty were also attracted to the north-east in February 1996 for a combined total of around £11 million.

An explosive start to the season saw Newcastle storm to the top of the Premier League table. Newcastle led the league for virtually all of the season from August until mid-March, and by Christmas had established a 10-point lead over Manchester United. Though they lost 2–0 at Old Trafford on 27 December, they still managed to extend this lead to 12 points on 20 January 1996, putting them in prime position for the title with 15 matches remaining. However, Manchester United – bolstered by the return of Eric Cantona from suspension – then enjoyed a surge in form. Despite an emphatic 2–1 win at Middlesbrough largely inspired by debutant Faustino Asprilla, Newcastle lost five of their next eight. Newcastle dropped vital points away to West Ham and Manchester City, whilst a 1–0 win for Alex Ferguson's team at St James' Park on 4 March ended Newcastle's 100% home record in the league and cut their lead to a single point, and further away defeats at Arsenal, Liverpool and Blackburn Rovers allowed Manchester United to overtake them and establish a lead that would ultimately prove decisive.

Ferguson's mind games added further heat to the title race and provoked an infamous rant from Keegan live on Sky Sports on 29 April 1996, following his team's 1–0 win at Leeds United. A 1–1 draw at Nottingham Forest three days later left Newcastle needing to beat Tottenham Hotspur, and Manchester United needing to lose against Middlesbrough, if the title was to return to Tyneside for the first time since 1927. In the end, a 1–1 draw proved academic as Manchester United beat the Teessiders 3–0, thus winning by four points. Newcastle's second-place finish was nonetheless their highest finish for 69 years.

== Analysis ==
The contest between Newcastle United and Manchester United for the Premier League title in the 1995–96 season has been described by Total Football magazine as "an absolute classic". In 2012, the season was one of six nominees for the Premier League 20 Seasons Award for the best Premier League season ever.

The 4–3 loss to Liverpool was voted the greatest game of the first decade of the Premier League at the Premier League 10 Seasons Awards, attributing to the jubilant celebrations at Anfield whilst Keegan slumped over the advertising hoardings in distress.

Newcastle's collapse in the Premier League title race has been the subject of continuous debate. Newcastle's performance has been described by Graham Lister of Goal.com as having "entered football folklore as the Premier League's ultimate Devon Loch moment." Rob Lee claimed that the failure to capture the title was due to falling player confidence, whilst Ian Cusack believed that the return of Eric Cantona was the major difference, stating "Newcastle United had, player for player, the best team in the Premiership, but didn't have the best player." Mark Lawrenson said the general consensus was Keegan's attacking philosophy having been instrumental in costing Newcastle the title, stating "I really think they should have won the league in the 1995–96 season...Kevin could have done it if he'd altered the system very, very slightly. But he didn't want to betray his principles...I think Kevin wanted it free-flowing in all departments and that doesn't necessarily happen."

== Final league table ==
Pos	Team	Pld	W	D	L	GF	GA	GD	Pts	Qualification or relegation
1	Manchester United (C)	38	25	7	6	73	35	+38	82	Qualification for the Champions League group stage
2	Newcastle United	38	24	6	8	66	37	+29	78	Qualification for the UEFA Cup first round
3	Liverpool	38	20	11	7	70	34	+36	71	Qualification for the Cup Winners' Cup first round (Note: Liverpool qualified for the Cup Winners' Cup as FA Cup runners-up, as winners Manchester United already qualified for the Champions League. They defaulted their UEFA Cup spot from league position to Arsenal.)
4	Aston Villa	38	18	9	11	52	35	+17	63	Qualification for the UEFA Cup first round
5	Arsenal	38	17	12	9	49	32	+17	63	Qualification for the UEFA Cup first round

Source: Premier League
Rules for classification: 1) points; 2) goal difference; 3) number of goals scored.
(C) Champions

=== Results by round ===
Round	1	2	3	4	5	6	7	8	9	10	11	12	13	14	15	16	17	18	19	20	21	22	23	24	25	26	27	28	29	30	31	32	33	34	35	36	37	38
Ground	H	A	A	H	A	H	H	A	A	H	A	H	H	A	H	A (Note: Due to Wimbledon lacking a home stadium, they played their home games at Selhurst Park, which is the home stadium of Crystal Palace.)	A	H	H	A	H	A	H	H	A	A	A	H	H	A	A	H	A	H	H	A	A	H
Result	W	W	W	W	L	W	W	W	W	W	D	W	W	D	W	D	L	W	W	L	W	W	W	W	W	L	D	L	W	L	L	W	L	W	W	W	D	D
Position	1	1	1	1	1	1	1	1	1	1	1	1	1	1	1	1	1	1	1	1	1	1	1	1	1	1	1	1	1	2	2	2	2	2	2	2	2	2

Source: Competitive matches
A = Away; H = Home; W = Win; D = Draw; L = Loss; = Leader, 1996-97 UEFA Champions League; = 1996-97 UEFA Cup; = 1996–97 Football League

== Kit ==
Newcastle United's kit was manufactured by the company Adidas and sponsored by Tyneside-based brewery Newcastle Brown Ale.

== Players ==
=== First-team squad ===
Squad at end of season

Note: Flags indicate national team as defined under FIFA eligibility rules; some limited exceptions apply. Players may hold more than one non-FIFA nationality.

No.	Pos.	Nation	Player
1	GK	CZE	Pavel Srníček
2	DF	ENG	Warren Barton
3	DF	ENG	John Beresford
4	DF	ENG	Darren Peacock
6	DF	ENG	Steve Howey
7	MF	ENG	Rob Lee (captain)
8	MF	ENG	Peter Beardsley
9	FW	ENG	Les Ferdinand
10	MF	ENG	Lee Clark
11	FW	COL	Faustino Asprilla
14	MF	FRA	David Ginola
15	GK	ENG	Shaka Hislop

No.	Pos.	Nation	Player
16	FW	ENG	Darren Huckerby
17	MF	IRL	Jimmy Crawford
18	MF	NIR	Keith Gillespie
19	DF	ENG	Steve Watson
22	MF	ENG	David Batty
23	MF	ENG	Chris Holland
25	FW	ENG	Paul Brayson
26	DF	ENG	Robbie Elliott
27	DF	BEL	Philippe Albert
28	FW	ENG	Paul Kitson
30	GK	ENG	Mike Hooper
32	GK	ENG	Steve Harper

=== Left club during season ===
Note: Flags indicate national team as defined under FIFA eligibility rules; some limited exceptions apply. Players may hold more than one non-FIFA nationality.

No.	Pos.	Nation	Player
5	MF	ENG	Ruel Fox (to Tottenham Hotspur)
11	MF	ENG	Scott Sellars (to Bolton Wanderers)
12	DF	SUI	Marc Hottiger (to Everton)

No.	Pos.	Nation	Player
21	FW	WAL	Malcolm Allen (retired)
22	MF	ENG	Ritchie Appleby (to Ipswich Town)
25	DF	ENG	Nathan Murray (to Carlisle United)

=== Reserves ===
The following players did not appear for the first-team this season.

Note: Flags indicate national team as defined under FIFA eligibility rules; some limited exceptions apply. Players may hold more than one non-FIFA nationality.

No.	Pos.	Nation	Player
—	GK	ENG	Peter Keen
—	DF	ENG	Stuart Elliott
—	MF	ENG	Paul Arnison
—	MF	ENG	Paul Barrett

No.	Pos.	Nation	Player
—	MF	ENG	David Burt
—	MF	ENG	Jamie McClen
—	MF	ENG	Alan Pouton
—	FW	ENG	Michael Chopra
—	FW	ENG	David Eatock

== Appearances, goals and cards ==
Starts + substitute appearances)

No.	Pos.	Name	League		FA Cup		League Cup		Total		Discipline	
No.	Pos.	Name	Apps	Goals	Apps	Goals	Apps	Goals	Apps	Goals	Yellow card	Red card
15	GK	(Trinidad and Tobago) Shaka Hislop	24	0	0	0	4	0	28	0	0	0
2	DF	(England) Warren Barton	30+1	0	2	0	5	1	37+1	1	4	0
4	DF	(England) Darren Peacock	33+1	0	2	0	5	2	40+1	2	3	0
6	DF	(England) Steve Howey	28	1	1	0	4	0	33	1	2	0
3	DF	(England) John Beresford	32+1	0	1	0	2	0	35+1	0	4	1
18	MF	(Northern Ireland) Keith Gillespie	26+2	3	0	0	4	1	30+2	4	3	0
10	MF	(England) Lee Clark	22+6	2	1+1	0	3	0	26+7	2	1	0
7	MF	(England) Rob Lee	36	8	1	0	3	1	40	9	1	0
14	MF	(France) David Ginola	34	5	2	0	4	0	40	5	6	0
8	MF	(England) Peter Beardsley	35	8	2	1	3	2	40	11	6	0
9	FW	(England) Les Ferdinand	37	25	2	1	5	3	44	29	4	0
1	GK	(Czech Republic) Pavel Srníček	14+1	0	2	0	1+1	0	17+2	0	0	0
27	DF	(Belgium) Philippe Albert	19+4	4	2	1	2+1	1	23+5	6	4	0
19	DF	(England) Steve Watson	15+8	3	1	0	3+1	1	19+9	4	0	0
11	FW	(Colombia) Faustino Asprilla	11+3	3	0	0	0	0	11+3	3	2	0
22	MF	(England) David Batty	11	1	0	0	0	0	11	1	2	0
26	DF	(England) Robbie Elliott	5+1	0	1+1	0	2	0	8+2	0	1	0
28	FW	(England) Paul Kitson	2+5	2	2	0	0	0	4+5	2	1	0
11	MF	(England) Scott Sellars	2+4	0	0	0	2	1	4+4	1	0	0
5	MF	(Montserrat) Ruel Fox	2+2	0	0	0	1	0	3+2	0	0	0
12	DF	(Switzerland) Marc Hottiger	0+1	0	0	0	1+1	0	1+2	0	0	0
16	FW	(England) Darren Huckerby	0+1	0	0+1	0	0	0	0+2	0	0	0
17	MF	(Republic of Ireland) Jimmy Crawford	0	0	0	0	0+1	0	0+1	0	0	0
23	MF	(England) Chris Holland	0	0	0	0	0+1	0	0+1	0	0	0
25	FW	(England) Paul Brayson	0	0	0	0	1	0	1	0	0	0

== Coaching staff ==
Position	Staff
Manager	(England) Kevin Keegan
Assistant Manager	(England) Terry McDermott
First Team Coach	(England) Arthur Cox
First Team Coach	(England) Chris McMenemy

== Matches ==
=== Pre-season ===
22 July 1995	Hartlepool United	0–4	Newcastle United	Hartlepool
			Allen 22', 45'; Kitson 57'; Brayson 70'	Stadium: Victoria Park; Attendance: 5,300

26 July 1995	Rushden & Diamonds	1–3	Newcastle United	Irthlingborough
	Watkins 87'		Ferdinand 26', 59'; Brayson 70'	Stadium: Nene Park; Attendance: 4,600

5 August 1995	Celtic	1–1	Newcastle United	Glasgow
	Collins 29' (pen.)		Ferdinand 56'	Stadium: Celtic Park; Attendance: 31,000

7 August 1995	Gateshead	0–4	Newcastle United	Gateshead
			Ferdinand 4', 13'; Beardsley 16' (pen.); Gillespie 90'	Stadium: Gateshead International Stadium

9 August 1995	Heart of Midlothian	0–1	Newcastle United	Edinburgh
			Beardsley 65'	Stadium: Tynecastle Stadium; Attendance: 13,337

12 August 1995	Tottenham Hotspur	0–2	Newcastle United	London
			Sellars 45'; Ferdinand 70'	Stadium: White Hart Lane; Attendance: 17,288

=== Premier League ===
19 August 1995	Newcastle United	3–0	Coventry City	Newcastle upon Tyne
16:00	Lee 7'; Beardsley 82' (pen.); Ferdinand 83'			Stadium: St James' Park; Attendance: 36,485; Referee: Roger Dilkes

22 August 1995	Bolton Wanderers	1–3	Newcastle United	Bolton
16:00	Bergsson 51'		Ferdinand 17', 84'; Lee 77'	Stadium: Burnden Park; Attendance: 20,243

27 August 1995	Sheffield Wednesday	0–2	Newcastle United	Sheffield
16:00			Ginola 53'; Beardsley 75'	Stadium: Hillsborough Stadium; Attendance: 24,815; Referee: Paul Alcock

30 August 1995	Newcastle United	1–0	Middlesbrough	Newcastle upon Tyne
	Ferdinand 67'			Stadium: St James' Park; Attendance: 36,500; Referee: R. Hart

9 September 1995	Southampton	1–0	Newcastle United	Southampton
	Magilton 65'			Stadium: The Dell; Attendance: 15,237; Referee: G. Ashby

16 September 1995	Newcastle United	3–1	Manchester City	Newcastle upon Tyne
	Beardsley 18' (pen.); Ferdinand 38', 59'		Creaney 81'; Edghill (yellow card) (red card)	Stadium: St James' Park; Attendance: 36,501; Referee: Jeff Winter

24 September 1995	Newcastle United	2–0	Chelsea	Newcastle upon Tyne
	Ferdinand 41', 57'			Stadium: St James' Park; Attendance: 36,225; Referee: Peter Jones

1 October 1995	Everton	1–3	Newcastle United	Liverpool
	Limpar 81'		Ferdinand 11'; Lee 59' (pen.); Kitson 65'	Stadium: Goodison Park; Attendance: 33,080; Referee: Keith Cooper

14 October 1995	Queens Park Rangers	2–3	Newcastle United	London
	Dichio 45', 71'		Gillespie 46', 71'; Ferdinand 65'	Stadium: Loftus Road; Attendance: 18,254; Referee: Paul Durkin

21 October 1995	Newcastle United	6–1	Wimbledon	Newcastle upon Tyne
	Howey 31'; Ferdinand 35', 40', 63'; Clark 59'; Albert 84'		Gayle 60'	Stadium: St James' Park; Attendance: 36,434; Referee: Graham Poll

29 October 1995	Tottenham Hotspur	1–1	Newcastle United	London
	Armstrong 21'		Ginola 47'	Stadium: White Hart Lane; Attendance: 32,279; Referee: Martin Bodenham

4 November 1995	Newcastle United	2–1	Liverpool	Newcastle upon Tyne
	Ferdinand 3'; Watson 89'		Rush 11'	Stadium: St James' Park; Attendance: 36,547; Referee: Mike Reed

8 November 1995	Newcastle United	1–0	Blackburn Rovers	Newcastle upon Tyne
	Lee 13'			Stadium: St James' Park; Attendance: 36,473; Referee: Dermot Gallagher

18 November 1995	Aston Villa	1–1	Newcastle United	Birmingham
	Johnson 22'		Ferdinand 58'	Stadium: Villa Park; Attendance: 39,167; Referee: Stephen Lodge

25 November 1995	Newcastle United	2–1	Leeds United	Newcastle upon Tyne
	Lee 70'; Beardsley 72'		Deane 31'	Stadium: St James' Park; Attendance: 36,572; Referee: Steve Dunn

3 December 1995	Wimbledon	3–3	Newcastle United	London
	Holdsworth 18', 65'; Ekoku 21'		Ferdinand 9', 29'; Cunningham 35' (o.g.)	Stadium: Selhurst Park; Attendance: 18,002; Referee: G. Ashby

9 December 1995	Chelsea	1–0	Newcastle United	London
	Petrescu 25'			Stadium: Stamford Bridge; Attendance: 31,098; Referee: Roger Dilkes

16 December 1995	Newcastle United	1–0	Everton	Newcastle upon Tyne
	Ferdinand 17'; Beresford (red card) 32'			Stadium: St James' Park; Attendance: 36,557; Referee: Paul Durkin

23 December 1995	Newcastle United	3–1	Nottingham Forest	Newcastle upon Tyne
	Lee 11', 74'; Ginola 25'	Report	Woan 14'	Stadium: St James' Park; Attendance: 36,531; Referee: David Elleray

27 December 1995	Manchester United	2–0	Newcastle United	Manchester
	Cole 6'; Keane 53'			Stadium: Old Trafford; Attendance: 42,024; Referee: Paul Alcock

2 January 1996	Newcastle United	2–0	Arsenal	Newcastle upon Tyne
	Ginola 1'; Ferdinand 47'			Stadium: St James' Park; Attendance: 36,530; Referee: Dermot Gallagher

14 January 1996	Coventry City	0–1	Newcastle United	Coventry
			Watson 44'	Stadium: Highfield Road; Attendance: 20,547

20 January 1996	Newcastle United	2–1	Bolton Wanderers	Newcastle upon Tyne
	Kitson 9'; Beardsley 37'		Bergsson 19'	Stadium: St James' Park; Attendance: 36,530; Referee: Keith Cooper

3 February 1996	Newcastle United	2–0	Sheffield Wednesday	Newcastle upon Tyne
	Ferdinand 54'; Clark 90'			Stadium: St James' Park; Attendance: 36,567; Referee: Paul Danson

10 February 1996	Middlesbrough	1–2	Newcastle United	Middlesbrough
	Beresford 37' (o.g.)		Watson 74'; Ferdinand 78'	Stadium: Riverside Stadium; Attendance: 30,011; Referee: Steve Dunn

21 February 1996	West Ham United	2–0	Newcastle United	London
	Cottee 7'; Williamson 82'			Stadium: Boleyn Ground; Attendance: 23,843; Referee: Paul Alcock

24 February 1996	Manchester City	3–3	Newcastle United	Manchester
	N. Quinn 16'; A. Quinn 62'; Rösler 77'		Albert 44', 81'; Asprilla 71'	Stadium: Maine Road; Attendance: 31,115; Referee: Martin Bodenham

4 March 1996	Newcastle United	0–1	Manchester United	Newcastle upon Tyne
			Cantona 51'	Stadium: St James' Park; Attendance: 36,584; Referee: David Elleray

18 March 1996	Newcastle United	3–0	West Ham United	Newcastle upon Tyne
	Albert 21'; Asprilla 55'; Ferdinand 65'		Potts (yellow card) 90' (red card)	Stadium: St James' Park; Attendance: 36,331; Referee: Stephen Lodge

23 March 1996	Arsenal	2–0	Newcastle United	London
	Marshall 3'; Wright 17'			Stadium: Arsenal Stadium; Attendance: 38,271; Referee: Paul Durkin

3 April 1996	Liverpool	4–3	Newcastle United	Liverpool
	Fowler 2', 55'; Collymore 68', 90'		Ferdinand 10'; Ginola 14'; Asprilla 57'	Stadium: Anfield; Attendance: 40,702; Referee: Mike Reed

6 April 1996	Newcastle United	2–1	Queens Park Rangers	Newcastle upon Tyne
	Beardsley 77', 81'		Holloway 53'	Stadium: St James' Park; Attendance: 36,583; Referee: Paul Danson

8 April 1996	Blackburn Rovers	2–1	Newcastle United	Blackburn
	Fenton 86', 89'		Batty 76'	Stadium: Ewood Park; Attendance: 30,717; Referee: Gary Willard

14 April 1996	Newcastle United	1–0	Aston Villa	Newcastle upon Tyne
	Ferdinand 64'			Stadium: St James' Park; Attendance: 36,510; Referee: Martin Bodenham

17 April 1996	Newcastle United	1–0	Southampton	Newcastle upon Tyne
	Lee 10'			Stadium: St James' Park; Attendance: 36,554; Referee: Dermot Gallagher

29 April 1996	Leeds United	0–1	Newcastle United	Leeds
			Gillespie 18'	Stadium: Elland Road; Attendance: 38,862

2 May 1996	Nottingham Forest	1–1	Newcastle United	Nottingham
	Woan 75'		Beardsley 32'	Stadium: City Ground; Attendance: 28,280

5 May 1996	Newcastle United	1–1	Tottenham Hotspur	Newcastle upon Tyne
	Ferdinand 71'		Dozzell 57'	Stadium: St James' Park; Attendance: 36,589; Referee: Dermot Gallagher

=== FA Cup ===
7 January 1996 Round 3	Chelsea	1–1	Newcastle United	London
	Hughes 35'		Ferdinand 90'	Stadium: Stamford Bridge; Attendance: 25,151

17 January 1996 Round 3r	Newcastle United	2 – 2 (a.e.t.) (2–4 p)	Chelsea	Newcastle upon Tyne
	Albert 42'; Beardsley 64' (pen.)		Wise 62' (pen.); Gullit 89'	Stadium: St James' Park; Attendance: 36,535
	Penalties
	Beardsley (penalty missed); Watson (penalty missed); Beresford (penalty scored); Albert (penalty scored)		(penalty scored) Lee; (penalty scored) Wise; (penalty scored) Peacock; (penalty scored) Newton

=== League Cup ===
19 September 1995 Round 2 1st leg	Bristol City	0–5	Newcastle United	Bristol
			Peacock 8'; Sellars 22'; Ferdinand 30'; Gillespie 46'; Lee 85'	Stadium: Ashton Gate; Attendance: 15,592

4 October 1995 Round 2 2nd leg	Newcastle United	3–1	Bristol City	Newcastle upon Tyne
	Barton 48'; Albert 55'; Ferdinand 65'		Agostino (?)	Stadium: St James' Park; Attendance: 36,357

25 October 1995 Round 3	Stoke City	0–4	Newcastle United	Stoke-on-Trent
			Beardsley 30', 39'; Ferdinand 53'; Peacock 73'	Stadium: Victoria Ground; Attendance: 23,000

29 November 1995 Round 4	Liverpool	0–1	Newcastle United	Liverpool
			Watson 77'	Stadium: Anfield; Attendance: 40,077

10 January 1996 Round 5	Arsenal	2–0	Newcastle United	London
	Wright 44', 90'		Ginola (yellow card) 67' (red card)	Stadium: Highbury; Attendance: 37,857
