= 1993–94 Newcastle United F.C. season =

Newcastle United
1993–94 season
- Chairman: Sir John Hall
- Manager: Kevin Keegan
- Stadium: St. James' Park
- FA Premier League: 3rd
- FA Cup: Fourth round
- League Cup: Third round
- Top goalscorer: League: Andy Cole (34); All: Andy Cole (41)
- Highest home attendance: 36,388 (vs. Manchester United and Leeds United)
- Lowest home attendance: 25,887 (vs. Notts County)
- Average home league attendance: 33,439
Home colours	Away colours	Third colours

During the 1993–94 season, Newcastle United participated in the FA Premier League for this first time.

== Season summary ==
After four years in the First Division, Kevin Keegan's side were promoted to the Premiership as champions. The return of Peter Beardsley created a prolific striker partnership with the young Andy Cole, the pair scoring 55 goals between them in the Premiership. The club achieved a third-place finish in the league and UEFA Cup qualification - the club's first foray into Europe since the 1970s. Londoner Rob Lee, left footed midfielder Scott Sellars along with local youngsters Lee Clark and Steve Howey emerged as Premier League stars under Keegan's guidance. The team was nicknamed "The Entertainers" by the media, an indication of the style of play that Keegan instilled on the team. Cole also collected the PFA Young Player of the Year award, having scored a club record of 41 goals in all competitions. Beardsley also found the net 24 times in all competitions, meaning that the strike partnership of Cole and Beardsley had produced a total of 65 goals - the majority of the goals the team scored all season.

Post-season signings included World Cup stars Marc Hottiger and Philippe Albert, and Derby striker Paul Kitson.

A 7–1 win over Swindon Town matched Blackburn's record for the highest Premier League victory, which was set the previous season.

== Final league table ==
Pos	Team	Pld	W	D	L	GF	GA	GD	Pts	Qualification or relegation
1	Manchester United (C)	42	27	11	4	80	38	+42	92	Qualification for the Champions League group stage
2	Blackburn Rovers	42	25	9	8	63	36	+27	84	Qualification for the UEFA Cup first round
3	Newcastle United	42	23	8	11	82	41	+41	77	Qualification for the UEFA Cup first round
4	Arsenal	42	18	17	7	53	28	+25	71	Qualification for the Cup Winners' Cup first round (Note: Arsenal qualified for the Cup Winners' Cup as the defending champions.)
5	Leeds United	42	18	16	8	65	39	+26	70	

Source: Premier League
Rules for classification: 1) points; 2) goal difference; 3) number of goals scored.
(C) Champions

== Appearances, goals and cards ==
(Substitute appearances in brackets)

No.	Pos.	Name	League		FA Cup		League Cup		Total		Discipline	
No.	Pos.	Name	Apps	Goals	Apps	Goals	Apps	Goals	Apps	Goals	Yellow card	Red card
1	GK	(Czech Republic) Pavel Srníček	21	0	0	0	1	0	22	0	0	1
2	DF	(England) Barry Venison	36+1	0	2	0	3	0	41+1	0	6	0
3	DF	(England) John Beresford	34	0	3	0	3	0	40	0	1	0
4	MF	(England) Paul Bracewell	32	1	1	0	3	1	36	2	3	0
5	DF	(England) Kevin Scott	18	0	1	0	2	0	21	0	2	0
5	MF	(England) Ruel Fox	14	2	0	0	0	0	14	2	0	0
6	DF	(England) Steve Howey	13+1	0	3	0	0	0	16+1	0	0	0
7	MF	(England) Rob Lee	41	7	3	0	3	1	47	8	0	0
8	FW	(England) Peter Beardsley	35	21	3	2	3	1	41	24	2	0
9	FW	(England) Andy Cole	40	34	3	1	3	6	46	41	2	0
10	MF	(England) Lee Clark	29	2	3	0	2	0	34	2	2	0
11	MF	(England) Scott Sellars	29+1	3	3	0	1+1	1	33+2	4	1	0
12	DF	(England) Mark Robinson	12+4	0	1	0	0	0	12+4	0	2	0
13	GK	(Northern Ireland) Tommy Wright	2+1	0	0	0	0	0	2+1	0	0	0
14	FW	(Scotland) Alex Mathie	0+16	3	0	0	0	0	0+16	3	0	0
15	DF	(England) Brian Kilcline	1	0	0	0	1+2	0	2+2	0	0	0
15	DF	(England) Darren Peacock	9	0	0	0	0	0	9	0	0	0
16	MF	(Republic of Ireland) Liam O'Brien	4+2	0	0	0	0	0	4+2	0	0	0
17	MF	(Cyprus) Nikki Papavasiliou	7	0	0	0	0	0	7	0	0	0
19	DF	(England) Steve Watson	29+3	2	2+1	0	3	0	34+4	2	1	0
20	DF	(Wales) Alan Neilson	10+4	0	0	0	0	0	10+4	0	1	0
21	FW	(Wales) Malcolm Allen	9	5	0	0	3	2	12	7	0	0
23	MF	(England) Chris Holland	2+1	0	0	0	0	0	2+1	0	0	0
24	DF	(England) Matty Appleby	1	0	0	0	0	0	1	0	0	0
26	DF	(England) Robbie Elliott	13+2	0	2	0	0	0	15+2	0	1	0
30	GK	(England) Mike Hooper	19	0	3	0	2	0	24	0	0	0
31	FW	(England) Mike Jeffrey	2	0	0	0	0	0	2	0	1	0

=== Coaching staff ===
Position	Staff
Manager	(England) Kevin Keegan
Assistant manager	(England) Terry McDermott
First team coach	(England) Arthur Cox
Reserve team coach	(England) John Carver

Last updated: 3 May 2011

== Transfers ==
=== In ===
Date	Pos.	Name	From	Fee
16 July 1993	MF	(England) Peter Beardsley	(England) Everton	£1,500,000
July 1993	MF	(Cyprus) Nikki Papavasiliou	(Greece) OFI	£120,000
30 July 1993	FW	(Scotland) Alex Mathie	(Scotland) Greenock Morton	£250,000
13 August 1993	GK	(England) John Burridge	(Scotland) Hibernian	Free
13 August 1993	FW	(Wales) Malcolm Allen	(England) Millwall	£300,000
23 September 1993	GK	(England) Mike Hooper	(England) Liverpool	£550,000
4 October 1993	FW	(England) Mike Jeffrey	(England) Doncaster Rovers	£85,000 + David Roche
20 January 1994	MF	(England) Chris Holland	(England) Preston North End	£100,000
2 February 1994	MF	(England) Ruel Fox	(England) Norwich City	£2,225,000
24 March 1994	MF	(England) Darren Peacock	(England) Queens Park Rangers	£2,700,000

- Total spending: ▼£7.83m

=== Out ===
Date	Pos.	Name	To	Fee
18 June 1993	FW	(England) Andy Hunt	(England) West Bromwich Albion	£100,000
23 June 1993	FW	(Republic of Ireland) David Kelly	(England) Wolverhampton Wanderers	£750,000
23 July 1993	DF	(England) Mark Stimson	(England) Portsmouth	£100,000
5 August 1993	MF	(England) Alan Thompson	(England) Bolton Wanderers	£250,000
12 August 1993	MF	(England) Gavin Peacock	(England) Chelsea	£1,250,000
24 September 1993	GK	(Northern Ireland) Tommy Wright	(England) Nottingham Forest	£450,000
1 October 1993	MF	(England) David Roche	(England) Doncaster Rovers	Part-exchange for Mike Jeffrey
29 October 1993	GK	(England) John Burridge	(England) Scarborough	Free
20 January 1994	DF	(England) Brian Kilcline	(England) Swindon Town	£90,000
21 January 1994	MF	(Republic of Ireland) Liam O'Brien	(England) Tranmere Rovers	£300,000
1 February 1994	DF	(England) Kevin Scott	(England) Tottenham Hotspur	£850,000

- Total income: ▲£4.14m

=== Loans in ===
Date	Pos.	Name	From	Expiry
24 March 1994	DF	(Scotland) Brian Reid	(Scotland) Rangers	31 May 1994

=== Loans out ===
Date	Pos.	Name	From	Expiry
25 February 1994	DF	(England) Kevin Brock	(Wales) Cardiff City	26 April 1994

== Competitions ==
Win Draw Loss

=== Pre-season ===
Match	1	2	3	4	5	6	7
Result	2–0	1–2	3–0	2–1	3–0	1–1	0–1

=== League ===
Pos	Team	Pld	W	D	L	GF	GA	GD	Pts	Qualification or relegation
1	Manchester United (C)	42	27	11	4	80	38	+42	92	Qualification for the Champions League group stage
2	Blackburn Rovers	42	25	9	8	63	36	+27	84	Qualification for the UEFA Cup first round
3	Newcastle United	42	23	8	11	82	41	+41	77	Qualification for the UEFA Cup first round
4	Arsenal	42	18	17	7	53	28	+25	71	Qualification for the Cup Winners' Cup first round (Note: Arsenal qualified for the Cup Winners' Cup as the defending champions.)
5	Leeds United	42	18	16	8	65	39	+26	70	

Source: Premier League
Rules for classification: 1) points; 2) goal difference; 3) number of goals scored.
(C) Champions
Notes:

Round	1	2	3	4	5	6	7	8	9	10	11	12	13	14	15	16	17	18	19	20	21
Result	0–1	1–2	1–1	1–0	1–1	1–1	4–2	2–2	2–0	2–0	1–2	1–2	4–0	3–1	3–0	4–0	1–2	2–1	1–1	2–0	1–1
Position	15th	18th	16th	14th	15th	14th	13th	13th	11th	6th	11th	11th	9th	9th	8th	4th	6th	3rd	4th	4th	4th

Round	22	23	24	25	26	27	28	29	30	31	32	33	34	35	36	37	38	39	40	41	42
Result	0–1	2–0	2–1	2–1	1–2	2–4	0–1	4–0	1–0	7–1	4–2	2–0	3–0	1–1	0–0	1–2	2–0	3–2	5–1	0–2	2–0
Position	5th	5th	4th	3rd	4th	4th	5th	3rd	4th	3rd	3rd	3rd	3rd	3rd	3rd	3rd	3rd	3rd	3rd	3rd	3rd

=== FA Cup ===
Match	1	2	3
Result	2–0	1–1	0–2

=== League Cup ===
Match	1	2	3
Result	4–1	7–1	1–2

== Matches ==
=== Pre-season ===
24 July 1993	Hartlepool United	0–2	Newcastle United	Hartlepool
			Sellars 17'; Beardsley 43'	Stadium: Victoria Park

26 July 1993	Workington	2–1	Newcastle United	Workington
	(?) (?)		O'Brien (?)	Stadium: Borough Park

31 July 1993	Berwick Rangers	0–3	Newcastle United	Berwick-upon-Tweed
			Cole 2'; Papavasiliou 57' (pen.); Mathie 80'	Stadium: Shielfield Park; Attendance: 2,600

3 August 1993	Rangers	1–2	Newcastle United	Glasgow
	Hateley 62'		Cole 57'; Sellars (?)	Stadium: Ibrox Stadium; Attendance: 42,623

5 August 1993	Gateshead	0–3	Newcastle United	Gateshead
			Mathie (?) (?)	Stadium: Gateshead International Stadium

7 August 1993	Scunthorpe United	1–1	Newcastle United	Scunthorpe
	Thompstone 45' (pen.)		Watson 50'	Stadium: Glanford Park; Attendance: 3,975

9 August 1993	Liverpool	1–0	Newcastle United	Liverpool
	Ruddock 22'			Stadium: Anfield; Attendance: 21,757

=== Premier League ===
14 August 1993	Newcastle United	0–1	Tottenham Hotspur	Newcastle upon Tyne
			Sheringham 36'	Stadium: St James' Park; Attendance: 34,565

18 August 1993	Coventry City	2–1	Newcastle United	Coventry
	Ndlovu 58'; Harford 85'		Atherton 22' (o.g.); Srníček (red card)	Stadium: Highfield Road; Attendance: 15,760

21 August 1993	Manchester United	1–1	Newcastle United	Manchester
	Giggs 40'		Cole 70'	Stadium: Old Trafford; Attendance: 41,829

25 August 1993	Newcastle United	1–0	Everton	Newcastle upon Tyne
	Allen 18'			Stadium: St James' Park; Attendance: 34,833

29 August 1993	Newcastle United	1–1	Blackburn Rovers	Newcastle upon Tyne
	Cole 60'		Shearer 75'	Stadium: St James' Park; Attendance: 34,272

31 August 1993	Ipswich Town	1–1	Newcastle United	Ipswich
	Kiwomya 78'		Cole 47'	Stadium: Portman Road; Attendance: 19,102

13 September 1993	Newcastle United	4–2	Sheffield Wednesday	Newcastle upon Tyne
	Cole 21', 76'; Mathie 81'; Allen 88'		Sinton 26', 47'	Stadium: St James' Park; Attendance: 33,890

18 September 1993	Swindon Town	2–2	Newcastle United	Swindon
	Ling 60'; Mutch 62'		Clark 37'; Allen 45' (pen.)	Stadium: County Ground; Attendance: 15,015

25 September 1993	Newcastle United	2–0	West Ham United	Newcastle upon Tyne
	Cole 51', 84'			Stadium: St James' Park; Attendance: 34,336

2 October 1993	Aston Villa	0–2	Newcastle United	Birmingham
			Allen 46' (pen.); Cole 80'	Stadium: Villa Park; Attendance: 37,336

16 October 1993	Newcastle United	1–2	Queens Park Rangers	Newcastle upon Tyne
	Allen 48'		Ferdinand 10'; Allen 50'	Stadium: St James' Park; Attendance: 33,926

24 October 1993	Southampton	2–1	Newcastle United	Southampton
	Le Tissier 61', 86'		Cole 72'	Stadium: The Dell; Attendance: 13,084

30 October 1993	Newcastle United	4–0	Wimbledon	Newcastle upon Tyne
	Beardsley 36' (pen.), 63', 71'; Cole 60'			Stadium: St James' Park; Attendance: 33,392

8 November 1993	Oldham Athletic	1–3	Newcastle United	Oldham
	Jobson 35'		Cole 52', 81'; Beardsley 73'	Stadium: Boundary Park; Attendance: 13,821

21 November 1993	Newcastle United	3–0	Liverpool	Newcastle upon Tyne
	Cole 4', 15', 30'			Stadium: St James' Park; Attendance: 36,374

24 November 1993	Newcastle United	4–0	Sheffield United	Newcastle upon Tyne
	Ward 9' (o.g.); Beardsley 12' (pen.), 73'; Cole 70'			Stadium: St James' Park; Attendance: 35,101

27 November 1993	Arsenal	2–1	Newcastle United	London
	Wright 16'; Smith 60'		Beardsley 62'	Stadium: Arsenal Stadium; Attendance: 36,091

4 December 1993	Tottenham Hotspur	1–2	Newcastle United	London
	Barmby 61' (pen.)		Beardsley 55', 90'	Stadium: White Hart Lane; Attendance: 30,780

11 December 1993	Newcastle United	1–1	Manchester United	Newcastle upon Tyne
	Cole 71'		Ince 59'	Stadium: St James' Park; Attendance: 36,388

18 December 1993	Everton	0–2	Newcastle United	Liverpool
			Cole 15'; Beardsley 76'	Stadium: Goodison Park; Attendance: 25,189

22 December 1993	Newcastle United	1–1	Leeds United	Newcastle upon Tyne
	Cole 85'		Fairclough 66'	Stadium: St James' Park; Attendance: 36,388

28 December 1993	Chelsea	1–0	Newcastle United	London
	Stein 11'			Stadium: Stamford Bridge; Attendance: 23,133

1 January 1994	Newcastle United	2–0	Manchester City	Newcastle upon Tyne
	Cole 28', 45'			Stadium: St James' Park; Attendance: 35,658

4 January 1994	Norwich City	1–2	Newcastle United	Norwich
	Bowen 4'		Beardsley 20'; Cole 79'	Stadium: Carrow Road; Attendance: 19,564

16 January 1994	Queens Park Rangers	1–2	Newcastle United	London
	Penrice 20'		Clark 5'; Beardsley 63'	Stadium: Loftus Road; Attendance: 15,774

22 January 1994	Newcastle United	1–2	Southampton	Newcastle upon Tyne
	Cole 38'		Maddison 5'; Le Tissier 83'	Stadium: St James' Park; Attendance: 32,129

12 February 1994	Wimbledon	4–2	Newcastle United	London
	Earle 9'; Blissett 26'; Fashanu 59'; Holdsworth 63'		Beardsley 49' (pen.), 90' (pen.)	Stadium: Selhurst Park; Attendance: 13,358

19 February 1994	Blackburn Rovers	1–0	Newcastle United	Blackburn
	May 76'			Stadium: Ewood Park; Attendance: 21,269

23 February 1994	Newcastle United	4–0	Coventry City	Newcastle upon Tyne
	Cole 49', 70', 77'; Mathie 86'			Stadium: St James' Park; Attendance: 32,216

5 March 1994	Sheffield Wednesday	0–1	Newcastle United	Sheffield
			Cole 88'	Stadium: Hillsborough Stadium; Attendance: 33,224

12 March 1994	Newcastle United	7–1	Swindon Town	Newcastle upon Tyne
	Beardsley 12' (pen.), 70'; Lee 18', 67'; Watson 76', 79'; Fox 84'		Moncur 77'	Stadium: St James' Park; Attendance: 32,216

19 March 1994	West Ham United	2–4	Newcastle United	London
	Breacker 56'; Martin 81'		Lee 34', 73'; Cole 69'; Mathie 90'	Stadium: Boleyn Ground; Attendance: 23,132

23 March 1994	Newcastle United	2–0	Ipswich Town	Newcastle upon Tyne
	Sellars 37'; Cole 73'			Stadium: St James' Park; Attendance: 32,216

29 March 1994	Newcastle United	3–0	Norwich City	Newcastle upon Tyne
	Cole 37'; Lee 50'; Beardsley 70'			Stadium: St James' Park; Attendance: 32,216

1 April 1994	Leeds United	1–1	Newcastle United	Leeds
	Fairclough 89'		Cole 3'	Stadium: Elland Road; Attendance: 40,005

4 April 1994	Newcastle United	0–0	Chelsea	Newcastle upon Tyne
				Stadium: St James' Park; Attendance: 32,216

9 April 1994	Manchester City	2–1	Newcastle United	Manchester
	Walsh 33'; Brightwell 48'		Selllars 19'	Stadium: Maine Road; Attendance: 33,774

16 April 1994	Liverpool	0–2	Newcastle United	Liverpool
			Lee 3'; Cole 56'	Stadium: Anfield; Attendance: 44,601

23 April 1994	Newcastle United	3–2	Oldham Athletic	Newcastle upon Tyne
	Fox 19'; Beardsley 56'; Lee 63'		Jobson 43'; Sharp 57'	Stadium: St James' Park; Attendance: 32,216

27 April 1994	Newcastle United	5–1	Aston Villa	Newcastle upon Tyne
	Bracewell 15'; Beardsley 23' (pen.), 66'; Cole 41'; Sellars 79'		Beinlich 10'	Stadium: St James' Park; Attendance: 32,216

30 April 1994	Sheffield United	2–0	Newcastle United	Sheffield
	Blake 63', 90'			Stadium: Bramall Lane; Attendance: 29,013

7 May 1994	Newcastle United	2–0	Arsenal	Newcastle upon Tyne
	Cole 46'; Beardsley 66' (pen.)			Stadium: St James' Park; Attendance: 32,216

=== FA Cup ===
8 January 1994 Round 3	Newcastle United	2–0	Coventry City	Newcastle upon Tyne
	Cole 21'; Beardsley 76'			Stadium: St James' Park; Attendance: 35,444

29 January 1994 Round 4	Newcastle United	1–1	Luton Town	Newcastle upon Tyne
	Beardsley 65' (pen.)		Thorpe 39'	Stadium: St James' Park; Attendance: 32,216

9 February 1994 Round 4 replay	Luton Town	2–0	Newcastle United	Luton
	Hartson 16'; Oakes 77'			Stadium: Kenilworth Road; Attendance: 12,503

=== League Cup ===
22 September 1993 Round 2 1st leg	Newcastle United	4–1	Notts County	Newcastle upon Tyne
	Cole 30', 54', 63'; Bracewell 72'		Srníček 16' (o.g.)	Stadium: St James' Park; Attendance: 25,887

5 October 1993 Round 2 2nd leg	Notts County	1–7 (2–11 agg.)	Newcastle United	Nottingham
	McSwegan 51'		Allen 22', 35' (pen.); Beardsley 44'; Cole 59', 62', 82'; Lee 85'	Stadium: Meadow Lane; Attendance: 6,068

27 October 1993 Round 3	Wimbledon	2–1	Newcastle United	London
	Barton 23'; Holdsworth 69'		Sellars 28'	Stadium: Selhurst Park; Attendance: 11,531
