= Kevin Carr =

English footballer

Personal information
- Full name: Kevin Carr
- Date of birth: 6 November 1958 (age 67)
- Place of birth: Morpeth, England
- Height: 6 ft 0 in (1.83 m)
- Position: Goalkeeper

Youth career
- –1976: Burnley

Senior career*
Years	Team	Apps	(Gls)
1976–1985	Newcastle United	173	(0)
1985–1987	Carlisle United	17	(0)
1986	→ Darlington (loan)	3	(0)
1987	Middlesbrough	0	(0)
1987–1988	Hartlepool United	31	(0)
- Blyth Spartans
- Bedlington Terriers
Total		224	(0)
- * Club domestic league appearances and goals

Kevin Carr (born 6 November 1958) is an English former professional footballer who played as a goalkeeper, making over 200 appearances in the Football League.

== Career ==
Born in Morpeth, Carr played for Burnley, Newcastle United, Carlisle United, Darlington, Middlesbrough, Hartlepool United, Blyth Spartans and Bedlington Terriers.

After retiring as a footballer, he joined the police, become a detective constable with Northumbria Police.

== Honours ==
Individual

- Newcastle United Player of the Year: 1980–81
