= 1990–91 Newcastle United F.C. season =

Newcastle United
1990-91 season
- Chairman: Sir John Hall
- Manager: Jim Smith (until 21 March 1991); Bobby Saxton (caretaker until 26 March 1991); Osvaldo Ardiles (from 26 March 1991)
- Stadium: St James' Park
- Division Two: 11th
- FA Cup: Fourth round
- League Cup: Second round
- Full Members Cup: Second round
- Top goalscorer: League: Quinn (18); All: Quinn (20)
- Highest home attendance: 29,231 (vs. Nottm Forest)
- Lowest home attendance: 10,004 (vs. Oxford United)
- Average home league attendance: 16,879
Home colours	Away colours

During the 1990–91 season, Newcastle United participated in the Football League Second Division.

== Season Synopsis ==
After the disappointment of the failure to gain promotion at the first attempt in the previous season, the Magpies started the new season slowly. Injuries to key players Mark McGhee and John Gallagher did little to help manager Jim Smith's cause and, after a tussle with the board, Smith left the club in early 1991, branding the club 'unmanageable'. He was replaced as manager by the former Tottenham Hotspur and Argentina player, Ossie Ardiles. With the change of manager came a change of style, with a passing game where the ball rarely left the ground replacing the more direct style. It also marked the appearance of several promising youngsters, including Steve Watson, Alan Thompson and Robbie Elliott, alongside the more established youngsters, Lee Clark and Steve Howey. However, the gap between Newcastle and the top teams was too much to be breached and the team finished in mid-table.

== League table ==
Pos	Team	Pld	W	D	L	GF	GA	GD	Pts
9	Bristol City	46	20	7	19	68	71	−3	67
10	Oxford United	46	14	19	13	69	66	+3	61
11	Newcastle United	46	14	17	15	49	56	−7	59
12	Wolverhampton Wanderers	46	13	19	14	63	63	0	58
13	Bristol Rovers	46	15	13	18	56	59	−3	58

Rules for classification: 1) Points; 2) Goal difference; 3) Goals scored

== Appearances, goals and cards ==
(Substitute appearances in brackets)

Pos.	Name	League		FA Cup		League Cup		ZDS Cup		Total	
Pos.	Name	Apps	Goals	Apps	Goals	Apps	Goals	Apps	Goals	Apps	Goals
GK	(England) John Burridge	39	0	3	0	2	0	?	0	?	0
GK	(Czech Republic) Pavel Srníček	7	0	0	0	0	0	?	0	?	0
DF	(Scotland) Roy Aitken	37	0	3	0	2	0	?	0	?	0
DF	(Republic of Ireland) John Anderson	27	1	3	0	1	1	?	0	?	2
DF	(England) Matty Appleby	1	0	0	0	0	0	?	0	?	0
DF	(England) Darren Bradshaw	6 (1)	0	0	0	1	0	?	0	?	0
DF	(England) Robbie Elliott	5 (1)	0	0	0	0	0	?	0	?	0
DF	(England) Steve Howey	3 (8)	0	0	0	0	0	?	0	?	0
DF	(Denmark) Bjørn Kristensen	39 (1)	1	3	0	1	0	?	0	?	1
DF	(Wales) Alan Neilson	2 (1)	0	0	0	0	0	?	0	?	0
DF	(England) Ray Ranson	24 (3)	0	3	0	1	0	?	0	?	0
DF	(England) Kevin Scott	42	0	0 (1)	0	2	0	?	1	?	0
DF	(England) Mark Stimson	23	1	3	1	0	0	?	0	?	2
DF	(Scotland) Paul Sweeney	8 (1)	0	0	0	2	0	?	0	?	0
DF	(England) John Watson	0 (1)	0	0	0	0	0	?	0	?	0
DF	(England) Steve Watson	22 (2)	0	3	0	0	0	?	0	?	0
MF	(England) Billy Askew	1 (1)	0	0	0	0	0	?	0	?	0
MF	(England) Kevin Brock	36 (2)	5	3	0	2	0	?	0	?	5
MF	(England) Lee Clark	13 (6)	2	0	0	0	0	?	0	?	2
MF	(England) Kevin Dillon	19	0	3	0	0	0	?	0	?	0
MF	(England) Wayne Fereday	6 (2)	0	0	0	2	0	?	0	?	0
MF	(Scotland) John Gallacher	1	0	0	0	0	0	?	0	?	0
MF	(Scotland) Archie Gourlay	2	0	0	0	0 (1)	0	?	0	?	0
MF	(England) Lee Makel	1 (2)	0	0	0	0	0	?	0	?	0
MF	(Republic of Ireland) Liam O'Brien	23 (10)	3	0 (2)	0	2	0	?	0	?	3
MF	(England) Gavin Peacock	27	7	0	0	0	0	?	0	?	7
MF	(England) David Roche	5 (3)	0	0	0	0	0	?	0	?	0
MF	(England) Neil Simpson	1 (3)	0	0	0	0 (1)	0	?	0	?	0
FW	(Republic of Ireland) Tommy Gaynor	4	1	0	0	0	0	?	0	?	1
FW	(England) Andy Hunt	13 (3)	2	0	0	0	0	?	0	?	2
FW	(Scotland) Mark McGhee	17 (4)	5	2	1	2	0	?	0	?	6
FW	(Australia) David Mitchell	2	1	0	0	0	0	?	0	?	1
FW	(England) Paul Moran	1	0	0	0	0	0	?	0	?	0
FW	(England) Micky Quinn	43	18	3	2	2	0	?	0	?	20
FW	(England) David Robinson	0 (3)	0	0	0	0 (1)	0	?	0	?	0
FW	(England) Scott Sloan	11 (5)	1	1	0	0	0	?	0	?	1

=== Coaching staff ===
Position	Staff
Manager	(Argentina) Osvaldo Ardiles
First Team Coach	(Republic of Ireland) Tony Galvin
Development Coach	
Reserve Team Coach	
Chief scout	

Last updated: 3 May 2011
