= Steve Harper =

English footballer and coach

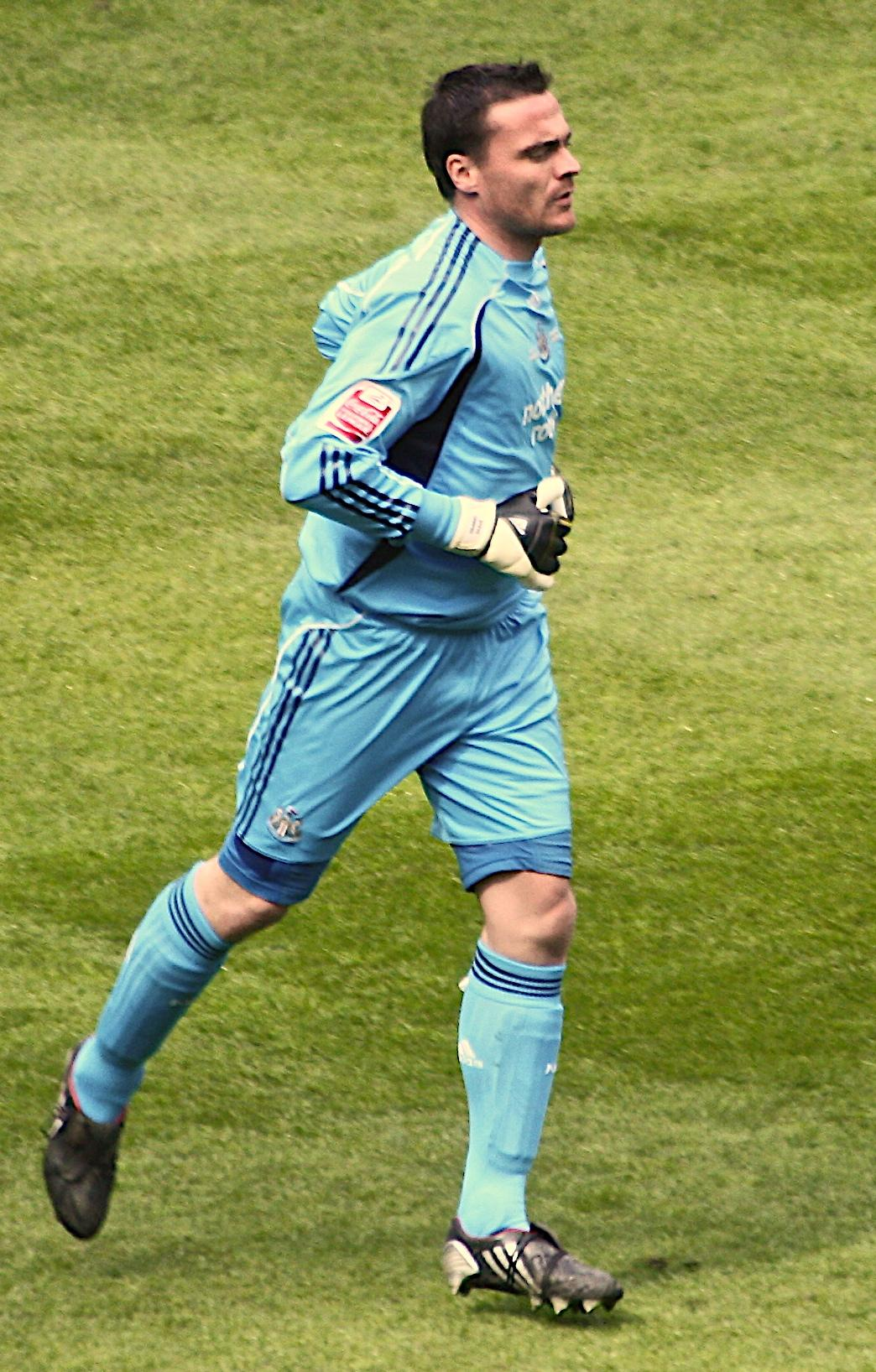
- Harper playing for Newcastle United in 2010

Personal information
- Full name: Stephen Alan Harper
- Date of birth: 14 March 1975 (age 51)
- Place of birth: Easington Village, England
- Height: 6 ft 2 in (1.88 m)
- Position: Goalkeeper

Team information
- Current team: Newcastle United (Academy Director)

Youth career
- 1992–1993: Seaham Red Star

Senior career*
Years	Team	Apps	(Gls)
1993–2013	Newcastle United	157	(0)
1995	→ Bradford City (loan)	1	(0)
1996	→ Gateshead (loan)	12	(0)
1997	→ Stockport County (loan)	0	(0)
1997	→ Hartlepool United (loan)	15	(0)
1997–1998	→ Huddersfield Town (loan)	24	(0)
2011	→ Brighton & Hove Albion (loan)	5	(0)
2013–2015	Hull City	23	(0)
2016	Sunderland	0	(0)
Total		237	(0)

Managerial career
- 2019–2021: Northern Ireland (coach)
- 2021–: Newcastle United (Academy Director)
- * Club domestic league appearances and goals

"I hadn't played for a while ... you're walking along shaking hands and you're thinking 'That's Pavel Nedvěd and that's Del Piero' and there's the Champions League music blaring."

— Steve Harper

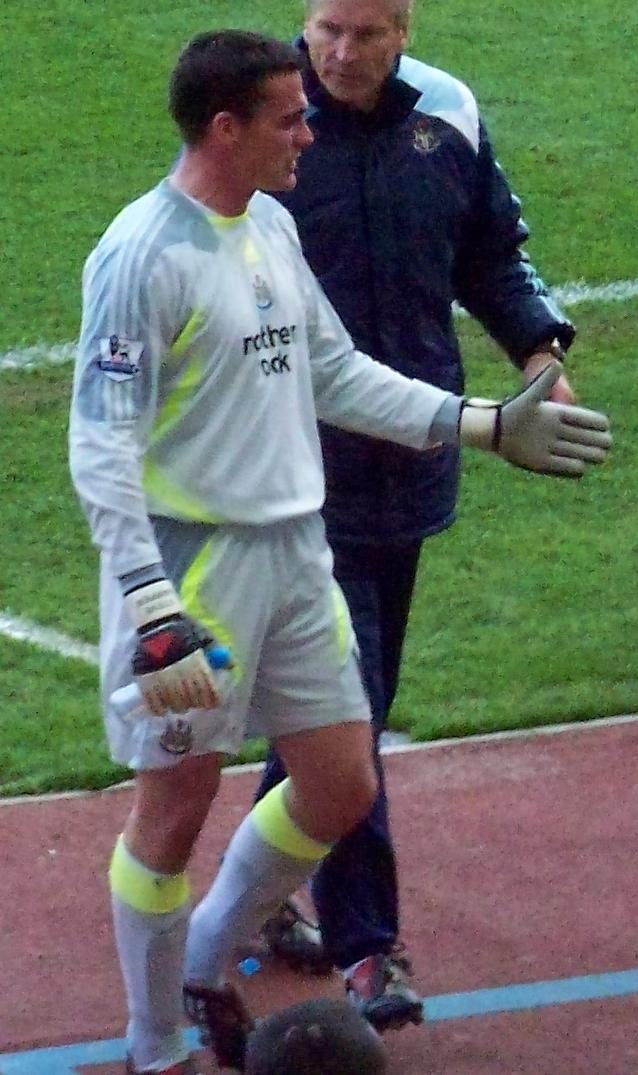
Harper with Newcastle United in 2008

Stephen Alan Harper (born 14 March 1975) is an English former professional footballer, and currently Academy Director for Newcastle United F.C. He is best known for his time playing at Newcastle, having amassed 157 league appearances over a twenty-year period between 1993 and 2013. Although he was not always the first choice goalkeeper at Newcastle, he was the longest-serving player in the club's history.

== Early life ==
Harper was born in Easington Village, County Durham. He grew up in the mining village of Easington, County Durham, and studied Sport at the East Durham College. He was interested in football from a young age and goalkeeper Bruce Grobbelaar was his idol. Anfield was the first football ground he went to, where he watched Liverpool win a match 2–0 in the 1982–83 season. Harper attended Easington Comprehensive School. He was offered a place at Liverpool John Moores University.

Harper was a boyhood fan of Liverpool FC and Newcastle United FC

== Career ==
=== Newcastle United ===
In 1993, he was signed by Newcastle United from his local club Seaham Red Star, for a nominal fee.

Seen as back-up to first-choice goalkeeper Pavel Srníček after his arrival at Newcastle, and then Shaka Hislop and subsequently Shay Given; he had loan spells at Bradford City, Gateshead, Stockport County, Hartlepool United and Huddersfield Town before making his first-team debut as a half time substitute against Wimbledon in 1998. At this point Harper achieved the rare feat of making an appearance in each of the top five divisions of the English game.

Harper came close to dislodging Given on numerous occasions, most notably in the 1998–99 season. Harper played in the 1999 FA Cup Final, when Newcastle lost 2–0 to Manchester United. Then-manager Ruud Gullit appeared to see Harper worthy of playing over Given. However, at the start of the 1999–2000 season, Gullit resigned and Harper again became second choice goalkeeper, although he did enjoy another brief period of first team action for part of the season when Given was injured. When Given returned from injury, Harper was once again used as the back-up goalkeeper.

In 2002, he made several appearances in the UEFA Champions League, most notably against Juventus. The match was played at St James' Park and Harper managed to keep a clean sheet during a 1–0 win over the Italian champions. The victory helped Newcastle qualify from the group stages of the tournament. Harper has handed in a transfer request in his time with Newcastle, citing lack of regular first team football as his reason (something which Given also did when Harper kept him out of the team under Gullit). He has been linked with moves to West Bromwich Albion, Celtic, Watford, Rangers, and Liverpool in his time with Newcastle, though none of these purported moves came to fruition.

He again expressed his desire to achieve first-team football in June 2006, an act which saw then manager Glenn Roeder attempt to persuade Harper to remain with the club. This appeared to work as he signed a new contract to keep him at St. James' Park until June 2009. An injury to Given early in the 2006–07 season gave Harper another chance to prove his worth in the first team. However, he did not have the best start to first team action, as Newcastle lost 2–0 to Liverpool on 20 September 2006, in what was Harper's first league start for 15 months. The second goal, a 65-yard lob from Xabi Alonso, saw Harper slip whilst backpedaling to reach it, although he did still attempt to get up and stop it. Despite this setback Harper gave some excellent performances in the season. One particular moment was his wonderful save against Manchester City in early November. Harper also received another run in the first team after a third injury to Given later that season, the highlight of this would be keeping a clean sheet against Chelsea, a feat only matched by two other keepers that season. This was the first season Harper played consecutive league matches since 2001.

On 26 July 2007, Harper came on as a substitute against Celtic in a friendly match and played as a striker – something which has continually come up throughout his career. Harper continued as Newcastle's goalkeeper at the beginning of the 2007–08 season under the then new boss Sam Allardyce. With Given struggling with a groin injury and rookie Tim Krul on loan at Falkirk, Harper was able to start the first six league games, keeping two clean sheets. However he lost his place again when Given was fit, though another injury to Given later in the season allowed Harper to gain more first team appearances under the new boss, and the manager who first brought him to Newcastle, Kevin Keegan. After a series of good performances, Harper was once again linked with a transfer away from Newcastle. Liverpool expressed an interest in signing him as backup to first-choice goalkeeper Pepe Reina. Keegan reacted to this by stating his intentions to keep Harper, and acknowledging his record of conceding just once in seven and a half hours of play.

Harper signed a new contract in January 2009, keeping him at Newcastle until 2012, his nineteenth year at the club. During the transfer window of the same month, Given moved to Manchester City, elevating Harper's position within the club and so after nearly 16 years, Harper was finally first-choice goalkeeper at 33 years old. Harper repaid the management's faith in him by putting in some fine match performances including several world-class saves and was the best goalkeeper in the Championship, keeping a club record 21 clean sheets in 37 matches and conceding 35 goals at less than a goal a game. Harper made his 50th consecutive league start for Newcastle on 6 March 2010, in the 6–1 win over Barnsley. This was his longest run of consecutive starts he had ever made in his entire career.

On 23 March 2010, Harper recorded his nineteenth clean sheet of the season after Newcastle beat Doncaster Rovers 1–0 at the Keepmoat Stadium, thus breaking the club's clean sheet record which had stood since Newcastle were last promoted in the 1992–93 season. Newcastle were eventually promoted, and went on to win the division title following a 2–0 away win at Plymouth Argyle. Harper considers the title victory as the highest point of his career.

On 18 September 2010, Harper was injured in a challenge by Jermaine Beckford during the 1–0 win at Everton, needing to be substituted in the first half. On 22 September it was confirmed he would be out of action for at least three months. In late October 2010, Chris Hughton stated Harper may be back in contention in as little as 3 weeks, after making a "very good recovery" and stated he would come back in "good shape". Harper returned to training in December 2010, and made the bench in new manager Alan Pardew's first game, beating Liverpool 3–1. Krul kept his place for the 2–0 defeat to Tottenham Hotspur as well on 28 December, but Harper returned as first choice keeper against Wigan Athletic away in a 1–0 win. Harper maintained his place as goalkeeper throughout January and February. In the 2011–12 season, Harper once again lost his place to Krul and often did not even make the bench.

On 24 October 2011, Harper joined Football League Championship side Brighton & Hove Albion on a one-month loan, making his debut the same day in a 1–0 defeat to West Ham United.

In the summer before the 2012–13 season, Krul was given the number 1 shirt number, previously worn by Harper. He moved to the number 37. On 23 August 2012, Harper made his first appearance for Newcastle in 15 months away to Atromitos in the UEFA Europa League play-off match in a 1–1 draw. On 17 September 2012, in a match against Everton, Harper sportingly told referee Mike Jones not to book Victor Anichebe for a late challenge on Harper himself. On 22 March 2013, Newcastle announced that Harper will be leaving at the end of the 2012–13 season, thus ending his 20 years service at the club. On 12 May 2013, Harper was subbed on following Rob Elliot receiving a second yellow card against Queens Park Rangers. He played the final 10 minutes without conceding a goal, and Newcastle were assured safety from relegation.

On 19 May 2013, Harper played in his final game in a 1–0 defeat to Arsenal, in which he captained the team. Harper retired from professional football after the expiration of his contract at Newcastle.

=== Hull City ===
On 11 July 2013, it was revealed that newly promoted Premier League side Hull City are to offer Harper a one-year contract, as back up for their new goalkeeper Allan McGregor. Hull had previously approached Newcastle to take Harper on loan in January 2012 under then-manager Nick Barmby. Harper underwent his medical on 15 July.

On 15 July 2013, Hull City confirmed the signing of Harper on a free transfer, signing a one-year deal. On 23 May 2014, Harper signed a new one-year deal with Hull.

On 11 September 2013, Newcastle honoured Harper for his 20 years at the club with a Testimonial against an A.C. Milan XI. which included former Sunderland manager Paolo Di Canio. Former Newcastle players involved included Harper, along with Alan Shearer, Nolberto Solano, John Beresford, Darren Peacock, Nikos Dabizas, Lee Bowyer, Rob Lee, Ruel Fox, David Ginola, Peter Beardsley, Faustino Asprilla, Joey Barton, Shay Given and Andy Cole amongst others. Milan won the game 2–1 on penalties while £300,000 were raised for charity.

At the start of the 2014–15 season, Harper suffered a pulled calf in training, which kept him out of action for a while. On 28 May 2015, Hull City released Harper and five other players who were out of contract at the end of the 2014–15 season.

=== Sunderland ===
On 22 January 2016, Harper signed for, Premier League side Sunderland until the end of the 2015–16 season, to provide cover for goalkeepers Jordan Pickford and Vito Mannone. On 10 June, it was announced that Harper would not be offered a new contract by Sunderland.

== Coaching career ==
On 18 August 2016, Harper joined Newcastle United as academy goalkeeping coach. He left the club on 14 May 2019 after joining the senior Northern Ireland national team on 19 March 2019.

Harper re-joined Newcastle on 22 November 2019 as first team coach, though he continued working with the Northern Ireland national team.

== Outside football ==
Harper is also a Football Association-approved referee, one of the few professional footballers to have earned their referee's licence. This was subject to analysis during Sky Sports News' Respect The Ref campaign, where appointing former footballers as referees was seen as a way to increase the respect shown to referees on the pitch. Harper was considering becoming a referee when he retired from playing.

He has a social sciences degree from the Open University, for which he studied whilst playing for the Newcastle reserve team. Harper also enjoys reading, as well as golf, which he plays with former Newcastle United teammate Alan Shearer.

Harper also enjoys cricket and he regularly plays for South Northumberland Cricket Club. He is also enjoys watching Durham Cricket Club

He is a graduate of Manchester Metropolitan University's Masters of Sport Directorship programme.

== Career statistics ==
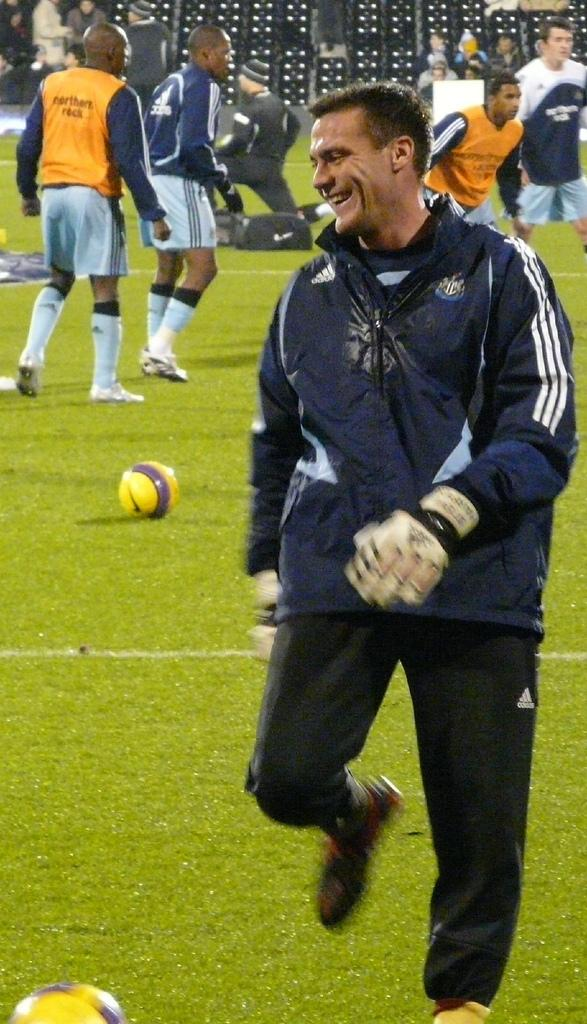
Harper training with Newcastle United in 2007

Appearances and goals by club, season and competition
Club	Season	League			FA Cup		League Cup		Europe		Total	
Club	Season	Division	Apps	Goals	Apps	Goals	Apps	Goals	Apps	Goals	Apps	Goals
Newcastle United	1993–94	Premier League	0	0	0	0	0	0	—		0	0
Newcastle United	1994–95	Premier League	0	0	0	0	0	0	0	0	0	0
Newcastle United	1995–96	Premier League	0	0	0	0	0	0	—		0	0
Newcastle United	1996–97	Premier League	0	0	0	0	0	0	0	0	0	0
Newcastle United	1997–98	Premier League	0	0	0	0	0	0	0	0	0	0
Newcastle United	1998–99	Premier League	8	0	2	0	0	0	0	0	10	0
Newcastle United	1999–2000	Premier League	18	0	4	0	1	0	6	0	29	0
Newcastle United	2000–01	Premier League	5	0	2	0	3	0	—		10	0
Newcastle United	2001–02	Premier League	0	0	0	0	3	0	0	0	3	0
Newcastle United	2002–03	Premier League	0	0	0	0	1	0	2	0	3	0
Newcastle United	2003–04	Premier League	0	0	0	0	1	0	1	0	2	0
Newcastle United	2004–05	Premier League	2	0	2	0	1	0	2	0	7	0
Newcastle United	2005–06	Premier League	0	0	0	0	0	0	1	0	1	0
Newcastle United	2006–07	Premier League	18	0	0	0	2	0	5	0	25	0
Newcastle United	2007–08	Premier League	21	0	0	0	0	0	—		21	0
Newcastle United	2008–09	Premier League	16	0	0	0	0	0	—		16	0
Newcastle United	2009–10	Championship	45	0	0	0	0	0	—		45	0
Newcastle United	2010–11	Premier League	18	0	0	0	0	0	—		18	0
Newcastle United	2011–12	Premier League	0	0	0	0	0	0	—		0	0
Newcastle United	2012–13	Premier League	6	0	0	0	0	0	3	0	9	0
Newcastle United	Total		157	0	10	0	12	0	20	0	199	0
Bradford City (loan)	1995–96	Division Two	1	0	0	0	0	0	—		1	0
Gateshead (loan)	1996–97	Football Conference	12	0	0	0	—		—		12	0
Stockport County (loan)	1996–97	Division Two	0	0	0	0	0	0	—		0	0
Hartlepool United (loan)	1997–98	Division Three	15	0	0	0	0	0	—		15	0
Huddersfield Town (loan)	1997–98	Division One	24	0	2	0	0	0	—		26	0
Brighton & Hove Albion (loan)	2011–12	Championship	5	0	0	0	0	0	—		5	0
Hull City	2013–14	Premier League	13	0	4	0	2	0	—		19	0
Hull City	2014–15	Premier League	10	0	1	0	1	0	0	0	12	0
Hull City	Total		23	0	5	0	3	0	0	0	31	0
Career total			237	0	17	0	15	0	20	0	289	0

== Honours ==
Newcastle United

- Football League Championship: 2009–10
- FA Cup runner-up: 1998–99

Hull City

- FA Cup runner-up: 2013–14
