= James Soulsby =

English footballer

Personal information
- Full name: John Norman Soulsby
- Date of birth: 6 December 1897
- Place of birth: Trimdon Grange, England
- Date of death: June 1980 (aged 82)
- Place of death: Gateshead, England
- Position: Forward

Senior career*
Years	Team	Apps	(Gls)
1912–1913	Gateshead Institute		
1913–1914	Gateshead Rodsley		
1914–1915	Newcastle United	1	(0)
1919–1920	South Shields	1	(0)
1920	Darlington		
1920–1921	Wallsend		
1921–1922	Blyth Spartans		
1922–1923	Ashington	32	(6)
1923	Blyth Spartans		
1923	Whitburn		
1923-1924	Spennymoor United		
1924–1926	Carlisle United		
1926–1928	Ravensworth Albion		
1928	Chester-le-Street Secondary Old Boys		
- * Club domestic league appearances and goals

John Norman Soulsby (6 December 1897 – June 1980) was an English professional footballer who played as a right back in the Football League for Ashington, Newcastle United and South Shields.

== Personal life ==
Soulsby served as a private in the Northumberland Fusiliers and the King's Own Yorkshire Light Infantry during the First World War.

== Career statistics ==
Appearances and goals by club, season and competition
Club	Season	League			FA Cup		Total	
Club	Season	Division	Apps	Goals	Apps	Goals	Apps	Goals
Newcastle United	1914–15	First Division	1	0	0	0	1	0
South Shields	1919–20	Second Division	1	0	0	0	1	0
Career total			2	0	0	0	2	0
