= John Beresford (footballer) =

English footballer

John Beresford MBE
Personal information
- Full name: John Beresford
- Date of birth: 4 September 1966 (age 60)
- Place of birth: Sheffield, England
- Height: 5 ft 6 in (1.68 m)
- Position: Left back

Senior career*
Years	Team	Apps	(Gls)
1983–1986	Manchester City	0	(0)
1983–1984	→ Finn Harps (loan)	0	(0)
1986–1989	Barnsley	88	(5)
1989–1992	Portsmouth	107	(8)
1992–1998	Newcastle United	179	(3)
1998–2001	Southampton	17	(0)
1999	→ Birmingham City (loan)	1	(0)
2001–2002	Ossett Town		
2002	Alfreton Town		
2002	Halifax Town	2	(0)
Total		394	(16)

International career
1983–1984	England U17	16	(2)
1984–1985	England Youth	6	(1)
1985	England U20	3	(0)
1994	England B	2	(0)
- * Club domestic league appearances and goals

John Beresford MBE (born 4 September 1966) is an English former professional footballer and sports television pundit.

As a player, he was a left back who notably played in the Premier League with Newcastle United and Southampton. His time at St James' Park saw him win the Football League First Division title in 1993, finishing runners-up in two Premier League seasons, as well as appearing in the 1998 FA Cup final. Initially coming through the Manchester City academy, he also spent time in the Football League with Barnsley, Portsmouth and Birmingham City, in Donegal, Ireland with Finn Harps, and with non-league sides Ossett Town, Alfreton Town and Halifax Town. He was a regular for England at youth levels and was capped twice for England B.

Since retiring, he has largely worked as a pundit for ESPN. In 2017, he was awarded an MBE for his support for the "Show Racism the Red Card" campaign.

== Playing career ==
Beresford was born in Sheffield, West Riding of Yorkshire. In his professional footballing career, he played for Manchester City, Finn Harps, Barnsley, Portsmouth, Newcastle United, Southampton and Birmingham City.

He is best known for his spell at Newcastle between 1992 and 1998, with his attacking tendencies being crucial to "the Entertainers". During this time, Beresford formed a formidable partnership with the other full back, his doppelgänger Warren Barton. One of his highlights at Newcastle was scoring twice in the first leg of their Champions League qualifier against Croatia Zagreb in 1997.

In a Premier League match against Aston Villa on 14 April 1996, Beresford was substituted after 25 minutes by manager Kevin Keegan after an argument between them that took place during play. The player later apologized for his behaviour, but did not play another game that season. By the following campaign, he had won his place back in the team.

Beresford is also known for missing his spot kick in the 1992 FA Cup semi-final penalty shootout against Liverpool while playing for Portsmouth. Liverpool agreed to sign him after the end of that season, but he failed a medical evaluation and Keegan signed him for Newcastle instead.

Beresford won two England 'B' caps in 1994, against Northern Ireland 'B' and the Republic of Ireland 'B'. He was also called up as cover for the senior England squad in March 1993.

== Personal life ==
In 2017, he was awarded an MBE for his educational work and supporting the "Show Racism the Red Card" campaign.

== Honours ==
Newcastle United

- Football League First Division: 1992–93

Individual

- PFA Team of the Year: 1991–92 Second Division, 1992–93 First Division
- MBE: 2017, for 20 years service to Show Racism the Red Card, the Anti-Racism Education Charity.
