= UEFA Financial Fair Play Regulations =

Financing rules for clubs in UEFA leagues

The UEFA Financial Sustainability Regulations are a set of regulations established by UEFA to prevent professional football clubs spending more than they earn in the pursuit of success, and in doing so not getting into financial problems which might threaten their long-term survival. Previously called Financial Fair Play Regulations (FFP), they are now sometimes abbreviated FSR, although UEFA uses this for "Football and Social Responsibility". The FA Premier League equivalent is called Profit and Sustainability Rules (PSR). Some have argued that FFP was instituted to prevent financial "doping" from outside sources injecting money into smaller clubs. They were agreed to in September 2009 by the Financial Control Panel of UEFA, football's governing body in Europe.

The regulations provide for sanctions to be taken against clubs who exceed spending, over several seasons, within a set budgetary framework. Implementation of the regulations took place at the outset of the 2011–12 football season. The severest penalty is disqualification from the European competitions. Other penalties included fines, the withholding of prize money, and player transfer bans.

On announcing the new legislation, former UEFA President Michel Platini said,

Fifty per cent of clubs are losing money and this is an increasing trend. We needed to stop this downward spiral. They have spent more than they have earned in the past and haven't paid their debts. We don't want to kill or hurt the clubs; on the contrary, we want to help them in the market. The teams who play in our tournaments have unanimously agreed to our principles ... living within your means is the basis of accounting but it hasn't been the basis of football for years now. The owners are asking for rules because they can't implement them themselves – many of them have had it with shovelling money into clubs and the more money you put into clubs, the harder it is to sell at a profit.

Platini went on to say that the measures were supported by the majority of football club owners, and that an independent panel would be set up to judge whether clubs had broken the rules. Although the intentions of encouraging greater financial caution in football have been well-received, FFP has been criticised as illegal by limiting the internal market, failing to reduce football club debt and protecting the status quo. In 2015, UEFA announced FFP would be "eased". A newspaper article alleged that this was in response to a number of lawsuits.

== Background ==
A 2009 UEFA review showed that more than half of 655 European clubs incurred a loss over the previous year, and although a small proportion were able to sustain heavy losses year-on-year as a result of the wealth of their owners, at least 20% of clubs surveyed were believed to be in actual financial peril. The reasons for this are well summarised in the 2010–12 House of Commons report on Football Governance:

Club owners are generally over optimistic about their management abilities and vision for a club. With ample academic evidence that there is a clear correlation between squad wages and points won (Note: The House of Commons report was citing research done on behalf of the Wall Street Journal.) – something which is obvious to owners – there is a natural tendency to borrow in the pursuit of success, although not all teams can be successful. There are many examples of clubs where the directors (true fans) have "chased the dream" – gambling short-term investment (or borrowing) in the hope of long-term success. The pressure on the directors of a club to invest, to sign a star player ... is often immense from ordinary supporters.

Even among Europe's elite sides, continued excessive spending has often been justified by club executives as being "necessary to keep the club competitive". As Christian Müller, CFO of the German Bundesliga told the European Commission: "... we learn by experience all over the world [that] most club executives tend to operate riskily, tend to overestimate their chances in the Championship. This may result in disproportionate spending relative to the income some clubs generate ... club executives have somehow to be protected from themselves."

The vast majority of the overall European football debt is owed by only three of the biggest leagues: the English Premier League, the Italian Serie A and the Spanish Primera División, commonly known as La Liga.

=== The English, Italian and Spanish leagues ===
==== Premier League ====
A report by Deloitte indicated that total debt among the 20 Premier League clubs at the end of the 2008–09 season was £3.3 billion.

At the time of the introduction of FFP, several Premier League clubs were known to be spending considerably above their income. For example, between 2005 and 2010, West Ham United recorded an aggregate net loss of £90.2 million, with equity of £13 million on 31 May 2010 following a re-capitalization. Meanwhile, Everton, whose former manager David Moyes had long received praise for his continued ability to keep the club among the top Premier League sides despite an extremely tight transfer budget, had a negative equity (in group accounts) of £29.7 million on 31 May 2010, making a net loss of £3.1 million in consolidated accounts.

Worst of all, though, were the finances of Portsmouth, which had a shortfall of £59,458,603 to the creditor in February 2010 (after deducting the book value of the asset). Having spent heavily on players over previous seasons (the previous year's net loss was covered by French–Israeli businessman Alexandre Gaydamak), Portsmouth were runners-up of the 2009–10 FA Cup in 2010, but as the season wore on the financial situation deteriorated, leaving players unpaid and the club with an outstanding bill for income tax which in turn led to a winding-up petition from HM Revenue & Customs. There then followed administration to avoid the club being liquidated, a nine-point deduction from the Premier League, and finally relegation into the lower division. A similar train of events had affected another English club, Leeds United, some years previously.

The problem of debt was not confined to the top division, with a number of clubs in the second tier of English football, the Championship, seemingly gambling their futures in an effort to gain promotion into the Premier League. The 2010–2012 parliamentary report into English football noted that "Much of the overspending [by non Premier league clubs] is as a result of the desire to get into the 'promised land' of the Premier League or indeed to simply stay there ... the prevailing reasoning amongst Football League sides seems to be that excessive levels of spending can be sustained for a few years within which time promotion must be achieved. After that, Premier League revenues can be used to pay off all the debts accrued."

==== Serie A ====
In the Italian Serie A, most clubs also reported a net loss over the previous season: Milan (group) €69.751 million on 31 December 2010; Genoa €16,964,706 on 31 December 2010; Fiorentina €9,604,353 on 31 December 2010; Bologna €4,166,419 on 30 June 2011; and Chievo €527,661 on 30 June 2011, among others. Only a few Italian clubs made a net profit, which included Udinese, Catania, Napoli (€4,197,829 on 30 June 2011) and Lazio (€9,982,408 on the group account on 30 June 2011).

Some of the Italian clubs had been losing money for a number of years; for example Inter Milan have accumulated losses of around €1.3 billion over the last 16 years with the president Massimo Moratti personally putting in over €750 million, while on 20 May 2005, Lazio agreed a 23-year repayment plan to pay back a €140 million overdue tax bill. The club recovered, however, showing a net asset/equity of €10,500,666 in its consolidated accounts on 30 June 2011, while net financial debt of the group (Italian: posizione finanziaria netta) was €9.01 million. Its city rival A.S. Roma SpA, from its ultimate holding company Italpetroli, intermediate holding company "Roma 2000" (the holding company or the head of Roma larger group of companies, holding company of "ASR Real Estate S.r.l." and "Brand Management S.r.l.") to AS Roma SpA (or AS Roma [smaller] group), owed considerable money to banks, including UniCredit. On 30 June 2010, AS Roma SpA had a negative equity (total liability greater than total assets) of €13.2 million on the consolidated balance sheet, which ultimately led to the group ("Roma 2000") being sold to group of investor led by American billionaire Thomas R. DiBenedetto (25%). Before the formal handover on 30 June 2011, the club had a net financial debt of €53.831 million, with a negative equity of €43.984 million.

==== La Liga ====
Despite the most recent report showing 8% growth in La Liga revenues, the highest of any European league, the overwhelming majority of the extra money went to the two dominant clubs, Real Madrid and Barcelona, primarily due to their ability to negotiate separate TV deals. During the summer of 2009, Real Madrid paid a world record transfer fee of £80 million for Cristiano Ronaldo. Being the world's richest club according to the Forbes' List, heavy spending on two other players, Kaká and Karim Benzema, with their associated high wages, trebled Real's net financial debt from €130 million on 30 June 2008 to €326.7 million on 30 June 2009, as the signing of Raúl Albiol, Benzema, Kaká, Ronaldo, Álvaro Negredo and some minor players to the 2009–10 squad were included in the 2008–09 financial year. Madrid signing one additional big name, Xabi Alonso from Liverpool in August 2009, made the net financial debt only drop from €326.7 million to €244.6 million on 30 June 2010, still higher than the previous eight seasons. The net asset/equity, however, increased from €195.9 million to €219.7 million.

Barcelona also continued to spend heavily initially, although the level had been slightly reduced in the years immediately following the regulations. On 30 June 2009, Barcelona's net asset/equity was €20.844 million. (Note: The net asset value, however, may under-valued or over-valued as the intangible asset, may be over- or under-valued. For example, youth product does not have an asset value given that there is no formation cost of that capital, such as a transfer fee; the asset value would also be amortized which the residual value of the contract in accounting did not reflect the true market value; lastly, there is a lack of protocol to make impairment on flops. The residual contract value may be greater than the market value as the transfer market always had fluctuation.)

Total debt in La Liga was estimated at £2.5 billion, leaving many of the owners, as so often in the past, having to put more of their own money into clubs. In the summer of 2010, Villarreal failed to pay its players because the ceramics industry from which their owner Fernando Roig made his money was hit hard by the European credit crisis. At the end of the year, Deportivo de La Coruña were more than €120 million in debt, Atlético Madrid owed more than €300 million, while the total for Valencia at one point in 2009 was reported to be as high as €547 million. In 2007, during a property boom, Valencia's management decided to build a new 70,000 capacity stadium, despite doubts that it could attract enough fans to regularly fill it. Construction of the "Nou Mestalla" was to be funded by the sale of the existing ground; however, two years into the project, work ground to a halt when the club could not find a buyer following the Spanish property crash. Despite an impressive display on the field, Valencia was forced to temporarily halt work on a new stadium and delay wages when its bank denied it more credit, forcing management to sell some of their top players, including David Silva, David Villa, and Juan Mata.

In the lower Spanish leagues, at least six clubs, including former second-tier sides Real Sociedad, Celta de Vigo, and Levante, were in administration with more threatened as the recession worsened. In July 2008, the Spanish government revealed that the clubs had a combined debt of £507 million to the tax authorities alone, with substantial amounts owed to a number of other state bodies.

=== The French and German leagues ===
For a number of years, the clubs in the two other big European leagues, the French Ligue 1 and the German Bundesliga, had been subject to regulations not unlike the FFP rules.

==== Ligue 1 ====
In France, the Direction Nationale du Contrôle de Gestion (DNCG) is responsible for administering, monitoring and overseeing the accounts of all professional clubs to ensure that owners are being financially prudent. Sanctions for non-compliance include transfer embargoes, reduced playing squads, demotion or even expulsion from the league. Despite lower incomes, French clubs do not carry the enormous debt of the English, Italian and Spanish leagues. A number of French clubs have produced small profits over a number of years, concentrating on developing young players in modern academies, who then generate profits when sold. For example, in the four years up to 2009, player trading by Lille, one of the leading clubs, exceeded €164 million in profit.

OL Group, the holding company of the same name (Olympique Lyonnais), had a net profit of €15.1 million in the 2008–09 season.

==== Bundesliga ====
At the end of each season, Bundesliga rules state that clubs must apply to the German Football Federation (DFB) for a licence to participate again the following year; only when the DFB, which has access to all transfer documents and accounts, are satisfied that there is no threat of insolvency does it provide approval. The DFB have a system of fines and points deductions for clubs who flout rules and those who go into the red can only buy a player after selling one for at least the same amount. In addition, no entity is allowed to own 50% or more of any Bundesliga club.

Despite the strong economic governance in the German league, there were still some instances of clubs running into difficulties. In 2004, Borussia Dortmund reported a debt of €118.8 million (£83 million). Having won the UEFA Champions League in 1997 and a number of Bundesliga titles, Dortmund had gambled to maintain their success with an expensive group of largely foreign players but failed, narrowly escaping liquidation in 2006. In subsequent years, the club went through extensive restructuring to return to financial health, largely with young home-grown players. In 2004, Hertha BSC reported debts of £24.7 million and were able to continue in the Bundesliga only after proving they had long-term credit with their bank. Bayern Munich made a net profit of just €2.5 million in the 2008–09 season (group accounts), while Schalke 04 incurred a net loss of €30.4 million in the 2009 financial year. Borussia Dortmund GmbH & Co. KGaA made a net loss of just €2.9 million in 2008–09.

=== Other leagues ===
Other European leagues include the Portuguese Primeira Liga, the Dutch Eredivisie and the Scottish Premiership. Due primarily to smaller nation populations and economies, these leagues, and others such as the Belgian Pro League and Scandinavian competitions generate less revenue than the European "Big Five" leagues. Consequently, the Deloitte Top 20 is heavily dominated from the big 5 leagues, although these leagues feature many successful and financially stable clubs.

Portuguese club Porto have competed regularly in the knockout stages of the UEFA Champions League and won the European title in 1986–87 and 2003–04. Despite generating considerably less revenue than clubs such as Real Madrid, Porto have used third-party ownership arrangements and international scouting, particularly in South America, to recruit and develop young players for subsequent transfer. Since 2004, the club has reportedly generated €190 million in net player sales to offset operating losses.[1]

The three main Dutch clubs, Ajax, PSV and Feyenoord, have each been crowned European champions at least once. In recent years, however, their dominance has been challenged by the emergence of other clubs such as FC Twente, meaning they can no longer rely on annual infusions of Champions League cash. As in other countries, the Global Recession greatly diminished sponsorship and TV income, turning an Eredivisie profit of €64 million in 2007–08 into a €90 million loss for 2009–10. PSV recorded a €17.5 million loss as their annual revenue dropped back 40% from €85 million to €50 million, while major rival Ajax – the only Dutch club listed on the stock exchange – lost €22.8 million. After enjoying 11 consecutive years of Champions League qualification and reaching the semi-final in 2005, PSV found its regular profits turning into losses and began selling top players, including Heurelho Gomes (Tottenham Hotspur), Mark van Bommel (Barcelona), Park Ji-sung (Manchester United), Johann Vogel (Milan), Alex (Chelsea) and Jan Vennegoor of Hesselink (Celtic). Able to count only on the much lower revenues of the UEFA Europa League (less than €4 million in 2010), the club took on a €10 million loan from its long-standing benefactor, the electronic giant Phillips, and in April 2012 was forced to sell its ground and training complex to the local council for €49 million, leasing it back for €2.3 million per year. A leading councillor said that the move was necessary because of "the idiocy of big money and the game played between millionaires and football agents".

Recognising the social and cultural importance of its clubs, Dutch authorities invested over €300 million in football between 2006 and 2011, mainly through indirect subsidies and loans to clubs such as FC Utrecht, FC Groningen, FC Twente, Vitesse and ADO Den Haag, though such aid has fallen foul of EU rules.

A 2011 report from PriceWaterhouseCoopers expressed deep concern at the fragile financial state of Scottish football. Despite a modest profit in five of the previous six seasons, net indebtedness of SPL clubs had grown over the previous year to £109m, with half of clubs reporting a worsening position and only two clubs debt free. Despite providing the first British team (Celtic in 1967) to become European champions, since the advent of pay-per-view TV Scottish football had failed to keep up with its English counterpart; in stark contrast to the Premier League's vast TV earnings, following the collapse of the Irish satellite broadcaster Setanta in June 2009 the joint Sky-ESPN TV rights to be shared among all SPL clubs now amounted to only £13 million per year, a figure little changed from the £12 million it had received under the Sky deal as long ago as 1998.

Following the global downturn, job insecurity and rising unemployment meant that a number of Scottish fans did not renew season tickets, leading to a 10% fall in attendance over one year. The entire turnover of SPL champions Rangers for the 2008–09 season dropped 38% to £39.7 million. As with other leagues, participation in the Champions League continued to make the crucial difference between profit and loss for the two "Old Firm" clubs. However, because of mediocre performances in recent years, the SPL champions no longer qualify automatically for the Champions League group stages and are now largely confined to the much less lucrative Europa League.

== Issues relating to Financial Fair Play ==
=== Leveraged buyouts ===
There was also concern at the heavy debt being loaded onto some clubs as a result of new owners borrowing heavily to acquire the club and then using future earnings to pay the interest, a practice known as a leveraged buyout (LBO). One of the world's richest clubs, Manchester United, was bought in this way by the Glazer family in 2005 after which the club, previously very profitable, remains several hundred millions of pounds in debt. Since 2005, more than £300 million which might otherwise have been spent on players, improving facilities or simply kept as a contingency has been taken out of Manchester United and spent on interest, bank fees and derivative losses. (While Manchester United FC Limited was almost debt free, its ultimate holding company "Red Football Shareholder Limited" had a negative equity of £64.866 million in its consolidated balance sheet on 30 June 2010.)

Liverpool found itself in a similar position after being purchased by Americans Tom Hicks and George Gillett in February 2007. Although subjected to less leveraged debt than Manchester United, by 31 July 2010, the club was suffering a negative equity of £5.896 million while its holding company, KOP Football Limited – the entity which carried the debt – had a negative equity of £111.88 million, leaving the club tottering on the verge of bankruptcy, and had to be put up for sale. Hicks and Gillett placed what was widely believed to be an unrealistic value on the club in the hope of making a vast profit however, for which they were severely criticised in the House of Commons as "asset strippers draining the club with their greed". Eventually Liverpool was bought by a new American consortium, but because leveraged buyouts are permitted under normal stock market rules they will not be addressed by the FFP rules.

The leveraged buyout model is common for normal business ventures where – apart from the actual employees – the overall national impact of a firm collapsing is not particularly significant since other companies will fill the gap in the market. LBOs have sometimes been defended by those using them as mechanisms to bring greater efficiency and financial discipline to target companies, although there are also examples where they have actually added to an existing problem of debt. To football fans who find themselves paying significantly higher ticket prices (around 50% at Manchester United in the first five years of the Glazer takeover), LBOs are anathema, perhaps representing the complete opposite of the wealthy benefactor model, taking money out of the club and providing few or no positive changes since no new players are purchased and no facilities are built or improved. As with debt taken on in an attempt to improve the team, unexpected failure (such as not qualifying for the Champions League) can cause significant financial problems for clubs loaded with LBO debt.

For these "emotional stakeholders", their club is not a "normal business" but rather an intrinsic part of their lives and often of great social and cultural importance to the local community. LBOs are also believed to have played at least a part role in takeovers at Portsmouth, Hull City, Chesterfield, Notts County and Derby County, and perhaps unsurprisingly, the main supporters groups of Manchester United and Liverpool, MUST and Spirit of Shankly called on the British government to legislate against future LBOs of football clubs, calling for an outright ban or a limit on the amount which can be borrowed against acquisition – perhaps along the German model where no individual can own more than 49% of the club. There have also been calls to restrict levels of dividend withdrawal and improvements in "proper person tests"’ introduced after the earlier takeover of Manchester City by Thaksin Shinawatra. After being ousted as prime minister of Thailand in a military coup, Shinawatra was accused of human rights abuses, charged with three counts of corruption and had his financial assets in Thailand frozen, but eventually made a significant profit when selling the club to Sheik Mansour in 2008.

=== Wealthy benefactors ===
A number of clubs across Europe were historically in a position to spend substantially more than they earned as a result of the benevolence of their owners who made substantial financial gifts to the club, either by paying off existing debt, providing direct injections of cash, issuing extra shares or giving loans which are later written off. Such a practice adversely affects the market by creating wage and transfer inflation as well as encouraging other clubs to spend more than they can afford in an effort to remain competitive.

For example, Internazionale's enormous losses since the mid-1990s have been largely underwritten by their president, energy company owner Massimo Moratti. Its archrival, Milan, was also financially supported by Silvio Berlusconi (over €120 million between 2007 and 2010). The Della Valle brothers, meanwhile, also contributed €84.7 million to Fiorentina from 2006 to 2009. Juventus had re-capitalized twice in recent years, by about €104.8 million after the 2006 Italian football scandal and in 2011 by €120 million.

In Ligue 1, Paris Saint-Germain became the richest club in France and one of the richest clubs in the world after Qatar Investment Authority became the majority shareholder of PSG by purchasing 70% of the shares in 2011 and effectively purchasing the club altogether in a deal worth €50 million, which covered an estimated €15–20 million in debt and losses of €19 million from the 2010–11 season. PSG splashed a French record €108 million and were the biggest spenders in the world for the 2011–12 season. In the English Premier League, Chelsea's massive transfer spending since 2003 has been paid for by their owner, the Russian oil and gas billionaire Roman Abramovich, while Manchester City is owned by one of the world's richest men, UAE Deputy Prime Minister Sheikh Mansour. Since 2008, the owner has spent in excess of £1 billion on players and infrastructure at the club, though this has drawn considerable criticism from other clubs and football figures. Arsenal manager Arsène Wenger, a major proponent of the FFP legislation, has referred to transparent owner equity investment as "financial doping" and has accused Chelsea, Manchester City, and Real Madrid of being "financially doped".

Referring to the intention to reduce the plutocratic influence of the "sugar daddies", UEFA President Michel Platini said, "If you buy a house, you have a debt but that doesn't mean someone is going to stop you from working. If you depend only on a rich benefactor however, then the financial model is too volatile."

== Delay in implementing FFP rules ==
Despite broad approval across Europe, in early 2010, the European Club Association succeeded in delaying the full introduction of the FFP regulations to give clubs more time to adjust. The original timescale was lengthened, with a phased implementation over five years meaning that the full rules would apply in 2015 instead of 2012. The clubs also rejected a proposal by UEFA that the new rule should only apply to clubs with a turnover of more than €50 million, agreeing that all clubs should be treated the same. Also on the agenda was a proposal to limit squads to 25 players with unlimited under-21 players per team at national and European level, as well as plans to reduce fees paid to agents. Clubs also agreed that they will not be able to owe each other money, nor will they be allowed to compete in Europe if salaries have not been paid to players or non-playing staff.

Despite the delay, ECA chairman Karl-Heinz Rummenigge, representing Bayern Munich, called the new rules "a magnificent achievement" and pointed out that 93 clubs from 53 countries who attended the ECA's General Assembly in Manchester agreed with the proposals. He stated, "After only two years of existence, the European Club Association has managed, together with UEFA, to set measures that will shape the future of European club football into a more responsible business and ultimately a more sustainable one."

Manchester United Chief Executive David Gill, also a member of the ECA board, said that his club would meet the new rules, despite their reported debts of £716.5 million. He said, "We have seen what the proposals are and we would meet the financial break even rules. We as Manchester United have always been run professionally and will continue to be run professionally."

== Summary of current FFP regulations ==
Only a club's outgoings in transfers, employee benefits (including wages), amortisation of transfers, finance costs and dividends will be counted over income from gate receipts, TV revenue, advertising, merchandising, disposal of tangible fixed assets, finance, sales of players and prize money. Any money spent on infrastructure, training facilities or youth development will not be included. The legislation currently allows for eight separate punishments to be taken against clubs transgressing the rules, based in order of severity: reprimand / warning, fines, points deduction, withholding of revenue from a UEFA competition, prohibition to register new players for UEFA competitions, restrictions on how many players a club can register for UEFA competitions, disqualification from a competition in progress and exclusion from future competitions.

Clubs are permitted to spend up to €5 million more than they earn per assessment period (three years). However it can exceed that level to a limit if it is covered by a direct contribution from the club's owner.

== Criticism of FFP ==
=== Creation of a big club status quo ===
One major criticism of FFP is the possibility of further entrenching the positions of the largest clubs, which generate the most revenue and profits, and can consequently spend more money on transfers and player wages.

Qualification and participation in the Champions League is a lucrative endeavor, paying out up to £60 million in prize money and television rights per season to clubs that reach the final. A club only has to play 13 matches from the group stages to reach the final. In comparison, finishing bottom of the Premier League is now worth £175 million, but is won over 38 matches.

The financial gulf between successful clubs in the top-tier of European leagues has had an impact domestically, most notably in the Premier League, where for approximately a dozen years (from 1996 to 2008) there was a near complete dominance of the three major domestic English competitions by just four clubs (Arsenal, Liverpool, Chelsea, and Manchester United). During this period, the lack of competition for lucrative Champions League football in England from outside of those four clubs was frequently criticised.

=== Questionable sponsorship deals ===
Some forums have expressed concern at the potential risk that as clubs become ever desperate to raise "allowable" revenue which will positively affect their balance sheet, they will indulge in questionable U.S.-style advertising and sponsorship practices from multiple backers which may eventually compromise the ethical composition of football. Some clubs are easily able to attract reputable sponsorship due to the willingness of companies to be associated with a successful brand. For example, many top clubs raise money from selling sponsorship for their playing as well as their away and training kit, and other titles like the "official logistics partner" (such as Serveto for Barcelona) or "official marine engine partner" (such as Yanmar for Manchester United). Several top clubs have similar deals.

=== Differing tax rates ===
In addition, there remains the issue of widely differing tax rates and social security costs to which the European leagues are subject, meaning that some clubs have to pay a player much higher gross wages in order for him to be left with the same net salary as if he belonged to a club in another country. In addition, the UEFA guidance states that each club's accounts must be audited under the national accountancy conditions applicable in their particular country, which may vary.

=== Third party ownership ===
One area of concern for English clubs is the practice of third-party ownership. Under this model, companies or wealthy individuals buy a percentage of a young player in the hope that if his value increases in the future they will make a profit based on their percentage. The advantage for clubs is that they can make big savings from not having to pay the full transfer value of a player and can also make other financial gains, that is, from selling on a player's image rights. Following the problems caused by the sale of Carlos Tevez and Javier Mascherano to West Ham United in 2006, third party ownership was banned in the Premiership, although it is widely used in South America and Europe and is permissible under FFP. Following the introduction of FFP, the Premiership unsuccessfully lobbied UEFA to review the situation to avoid English clubs being disadvantaged, and in October 2011, sports lawyer Jean-Louis Dupont told the BBC that the Premier League's third-party ownership rules were not legitimate and that a legal challenge to overturn them would have a "very, very good chance of succeeding".

On 4 February 2013, UEFA confirmed that it intended to ban third-party ownership of players, stating, "We think this should be the case all over the world, certainly all over Europe. If FIFA will not do it, we will certainly do it as far as Europe is concerned."

=== Charity and solidarity payments ===
Another big issue for English clubs is the substantial payments made to the lower leagues in the football "pyramid" and to other charities out of their joint Sky TV deal. In 2009–10, Premier League clubs paid a total of £167.2 million to various causes, including £62.2 million to recently relegated clubs in "parachute payments"; £56.4 million across The Football League in "solidarity payments"; £17.3 million to the Professional Footballers' Association (PFA); £7.8 million domestically and £3 million internationally to the Creating Chances Trust (a charity for children leaving care); £12 million to other charities such as the Football Foundation, which provides funding for grassroots sport; £2.9 million to Professional Games Match Officials (referees and assistant referees); £2 million to the Conference National; and £500,000 to the League Managers Association.
