= Jean Dupont =

Jean Dupont may refer to:

- Jean Dupont (cyclist) (1938–2025), French cyclist
- Jean Dupont (governor), governor of Martinique from 1635 to 1636
- Jean-Léonce Dupont (born 1955), French senator
- Jean-Louis Dupont (born 1965), Belgian lawyer
- Jean-Pierre Dupont (born 1933), French member of the National Assembly
