= Independent Manchester United Supporters' Association =

The Independent Manchester United Supporters' Association (IMUSA) was a supporters' group which operated between 1995 and 2023 to represent fan interests of the Manchester United Football Club. The group emerged in response to concerns over mismanagement of the club in the form of rising ticket prices and the prevention of standing in celebration after goals during games. The group is widely credited with unifying United fans against Rupert Murdoch's attempted takeover bid of United in 1998, and was particularly vocal in protesting the Glazer ownership of Manchester United. Before ending operations in 2023, the group was recognized by the Parliament of the United Kingdom as the oldest independent fans' organization in the Premier League in 2011.

== History ==
"IMUSA gave United fans an informed, legitimate and respected voice under an umbrella group. The people involved were known at the match by fans. They weren't armchair fans or gobshites who rang up radio stations. There was a degree of accountability because you existed at the match and had to back up what you said. [...] If you didn't go to games then you would have had no credibility in a group like IMUSA."

— Andy Mitten, creator and writer of the fanzine United We Stand.

The group was founded in April 1995 after an impromptu meeting between disgruntled fans of United's Board of Directors at a hotel in Gorse Hill. Their motivation came from a March 1995 match between United and Arsenal F.C. at Old Trafford, during which, an announcement from Tannoy speakers warned United fans celebrating after a goal that standing and shouting during the match was prohibited, and that failure to comply would result in ejection from the game. In addition to the abandonment of The Football Association's rule preventing F.C. owners from exploiting the game for their own financial gains and unkept promises by United to not further increase ticket prices: the ban on standing was regarded as the tipping point to create the opposition group.

The group is widely credited with unifying United fans against BSkyB's (under Rupert Murdoch) attempted takeover bid of United in 1998 through their show of professionalism and intelligence in the media, Their campaign against Murdoch's acquisition specifically saw Roger Taylor, the drummer for the English rock band Queen, donate £10,000 to the group. This and further campaigns launched by IMUSA saw additional support from the fanzines United We Stand, Red Issue Fanzine (RIP), and writer Andy Mitten. Despite the support, the group lacked funds to fully compete with the Murdoch and Glazer families.

=== The Glazers ===
Malcolm Glazer's takeover in 2005 bought about a sharp change in the nature of Manchester United fans' activism. FC United of Manchester was set up by fans opposed to the takeover. The Love United, Hate Glazer (LUHG) campaign provided a highly visible reminder of the fans' opposition to the takeover, globally, around the ground and famously in the £3000 Manchester United 'Opus'. In 2006 IMUSA accepted on behalf of 'Manchester United Supporters against the Glazer takeover' the Football Supporters Federation (FSF) Award for Services to Supporters.

Manchester United officials refused to formally engage with IMUSA following the takeover and so activities switched to campaigning at the national level and advocating for fans who had been mistreated at away matches abroad. At one point there were three IMUSA officers elected on to the FSF committee and reports were submitted to UEFA following incidents at Lille and Roma. IMUSA also took the lead on an eventually unresolved civil action against the Roma Police for their violent assaults on Manchester United fans in 2007.

In 2008 IMUSA organised commemorations at the site of the Munich Air Disaster in Trudering, a suburb of Munich, to mark the 50th anniversary. Several hundred were in attendance and the late Ian Stirling a then IMUSA officer recited a moving version of 'The Flowers of Manchester'.

In April 2010, the group successfully organized a mass boycott of season tickets in protest of the Glazer's continued ownership and mismanagement of United. In January 2011, the group submitted evidence to the Parliament of the United Kingdom requesting the reversal of The Football Association's decision taken in the mid-1980s to abandon their rule preventing the exploitation of football clubs by their owners. By January 2011, the group was recognized by the UK Parliament as the oldest independent fans' organization in the Premier League.

=== Decline ===
IMUSA's activity began to slowly decline by the 2020s, with the group's own website posting their last news article on February 5, 2020. Between 2 September 2023 and 13 October 2023, their website officially closed and their domain name became available for purchase. Since their closure, other independent fan interest groups such as The 1958 have voiced similar views against the Glazer family; organizing protests against their ownership since 2022.

== See also ==
- Manchester United Supporters' Trust, a similar fan association which has worked in conjunction with IMUSA before
- The 1958, a similar fan association with United
- Red Army, a fan association with United
- Industrias Metalúrgicas SA, a Colombia-based manufacturing company which uses the same abbreviated name
