= 1999 FA Cup final =

Football match between Manchester United and Newcastle United

- The match programme cover
- Event: 1998–99 FA Cup
Manchester United	Newcastle United
2	0
- Date: 22 May 1999
- Venue: Wembley Stadium, London
- Man of the Match: Teddy Sheringham (Manchester United)
- Referee: Peter Jones (Leicestershire)
- Attendance: 79,101
- Weather: Sunny

The 1999 FA Cup final was an association football match that took place on 22 May 1999 at the old Wembley Stadium in London to determine the winner of the 1998–99 FA Cup. It was contested between Manchester United and Newcastle United. Goals from Teddy Sheringham and Paul Scholes gave Manchester United a 2–0 win to claim their 10th FA Cup title. It was the second part of the treble of trophies Manchester United won during the 1998–99 season as they won the Premier League the previous weekend and had the Champions League final four days later, which they ended up winning.

Manchester United faced Premier League opposition in every round of the competition except the fifth. Their semi-final against the cup holders, Arsenal, was the last in the history of the competition to go to a replay; after a 0–0 draw in the original match, Manchester United won the replay 2–1. In the other semi-final, Newcastle beat Tottenham Hotspur 2–0.

As Manchester United had already qualified for the 1999–2000 UEFA Champions League, England's place in the 1999–2000 UEFA Cup was given to Newcastle United as the runners-up. Manchester United did not defend their FA Cup title, choosing instead to participate in the 2000 FIFA Club World Championship in Brazil, believing that it would help The Football Association's bid to host the 2006 FIFA World Cup (which was eventually awarded to the German Football Association). As winners of the FA Cup, Manchester United also qualified for the 1999 FA Charity Shield but as they already earned their place as Premier League champions, the cup berth was given to league runners-up Arsenal.

== Background ==
Manchester United went into the match as champions of England, having clinched the Premier League title in their final game the previous weekend after losing just three league games all season. They had also qualified for the 1999 UEFA Champions League Final against Bayern Munich, due to be played four days later on 26 May, and were unbeaten in their previous 31 matches in all competitions. By contrast, Newcastle United had failed to win any of their final seven league matches; since their last win (against Derby County on 3 April), their only victory had come in the FA Cup semi-final against Tottenham Hotspur. Newcastle finished 13th out of the 20 teams in the Premier League, and were knocked out of the Cup Winners' Cup in the first round and the League Cup in the fourth round.

It was Newcastle's second consecutive appearance in the FA Cup Final – having lost 2–0 to Arsenal in 1998 – and their 13th appearance overall. They had a 50 percent record in their previous 12 finals. Manchester United had a better record in their 14 previous final appearances, having won on a record nine occasions; the last two, in 1994 and 1996, had been part of doubles. With victory in the 1999 final, Manchester United would become the first English club to win the Double on three occasions, and it would put them one win away from a continental treble of the league, the FA Cup and the European Cup, a feat no English team had ever managed before.

The two teams had previously met 128 times in all competitions; Manchester United had won 60 times, Newcastle United 37 times, and the remaining 31 matches had finished as draws. Only two of those meetings were in the FA Cup: the first took place in the 1908–09 semi-final, when Manchester United won 1–0 at Bramall Lane in Sheffield on the way to their first FA Cup title, and the second in the fifth round of the 1989–90 competition, when Manchester United won 3–2 at St James' Park before going on to win their seventh FA Cup. Manchester United also came out on top in their two league meetings in the 1998–99 season, winning 2–1 at St James' Park on 13 March after playing out a goalless draw at Old Trafford on 8 November.

This was the first FA Cup Final that would not be replayed in the event of a draw. Instead, the match would be decided on the day, first with a period of extra time then a penalty shoot-out if the scores were still level.

== Route to the final ==
Manchester United		Round	Newcastle United	
Opposition	Score	Round	Opposition	Score
Middlesbrough (H)	3–1	3rd	Crystal Palace (H)	2–1
Liverpool (H)	2–1	4th	Bradford City (H)	3–0
Fulham (H)	1–0	5th	Blackburn Rovers (H)	0–0
Fulham (H)	1–0	5th	Blackburn Rovers (A)	1–0
Chelsea (H)	0–0	6th	Everton (H)	4–1
Chelsea (A)	2–0	6th	Everton (H)	4–1
Arsenal (N)	0–0	SF	Tottenham Hotspur (N)	2–0
Arsenal (N)	2–1	SF	Tottenham Hotspur (N)	2–0

As Premier League clubs, both Manchester United and Newcastle United entered the 1998–99 FA Cup in the third round proper. Newcastle were drawn at home to First Division side Crystal Palace, and Manchester United at home to fellow Premier League side Middlesbrough, whose 3–2 win at Old Trafford in the league two weeks earlier would turn out to be Manchester United's last defeat all season. Despite the team's goalkeeper, Shay Given, being sent off within the first 15 minutes and then going 1–0 down, Newcastle came from behind to beat Crystal Palace in their tie, while Manchester United also overturned Middlesbrough's 1–0 lead to win 3–1.

Manchester United's victory set up a fourth round tie at home to arch-rivals Liverpool, and Newcastle were paired with First Division Bradford City. Newcastle won 3–0 to book their place in the fifth round, while Manchester United again came from a goal down to beat Liverpool with two goals in the last two minutes of their tie.

The fifth round saw Newcastle drawn at home to their first Premier League opposition of the tournament in Blackburn Rovers, whereas Manchester United were paired with their only non-Premier League opponents, Second Division side Fulham. A goal from Andy Cole saw Manchester United win 1–0 to progress to the sixth round, but Newcastle were held to a goalless draw by Blackburn, forcing a replay. Newcastle striker Louis Saha, on loan from Metz, scored the only goal of the replay, and they were through to the last eight.

Home draws in the sixth round for both teams ensured that they had both been drawn at home in every round of the competition; Manchester United hosted Chelsea at Old Trafford and Newcastle hosted Everton at St James' Park. This time it was Newcastle who only needed one match to progress to the semi-finals, beating Everton 4–1 with goals from Temur Ketsbaia (2), Georgios Georgiadis and Alan Shearer. Meanwhile, Manchester United were unable to make their numerical advantage count against Chelsea after a bad tackle on Paul Scholes earned Roberto Di Matteo a second yellow card, Scholes himself was sent off for Manchester United. The match finished goalless and a replay followed three days later; Dwight Yorke scored in each half to give Manchester United a 2–0 win.

As per tradition, the semi-finals were played at neutral venues; Manchester United took on rivals Arsenal at Villa Park in Birmingham, and Newcastle United played against Tottenham Hotspur at Old Trafford. Both semi-finals went to extra-time, but only Newcastle were able to produce a result on the day; after referee Paul Durkin missed a handball by Nikos Dabizas that would have resulted in a Tottenham penalty in normal time, Shearer scored twice in the second half of extra time to send Newcastle to Wembley for the second year in a row. Manchester United's semi-final ended 0–0, although a goal from Roy Keane was ruled out for offside against Yorke, who was stood in the centre of the pitch not interfering with play, after Ryan Giggs had played the ball to himself in the build-up. After watching a replay of the incident, Manchester United manager Alex Ferguson claimed the decision was "absolutely ridiculous".

The replay (the last semi-final replay in the history of the FA Cup) is often included in lists of the greatest matches in the history of the tournament. David Beckham opened the scoring with a curving shot past Arsenal goalkeeper David Seaman from 22 yards, but Dennis Bergkamp equalised halfway through the second half, his shot deflecting off the knee of Jaap Stam. Nicolas Anelka had the ball in the back of the net for Arsenal again shortly afterwards, and their players had already begun celebrating before anyone realised that the linesman had raised his flag for an offside against Anelka. Roy Keane then received a second booking and was sent off for a cynical foul on Marc Overmars, leaving Manchester United to play out the match with 10 men. The match was heading for extra time when Phil Neville made a "rash" challenge on Ray Parlour inside the penalty area; Bergkamp took the penalty, but Peter Schmeichel guessed the direction of his kick correctly and made the save. The first half of extra time passed without incident, before Patrick Vieira gave the ball away to Giggs at the start of the second; Giggs ran from just inside his own half, taking on four Arsenal defenders as he drove into the penalty area, then shot from a narrow angle over the head of Seaman into the roof of the Arsenal net. Manchester United hung on for the remaining 10 minutes to secure their place in the final.

== Pre-match ==
=== Team selection ===
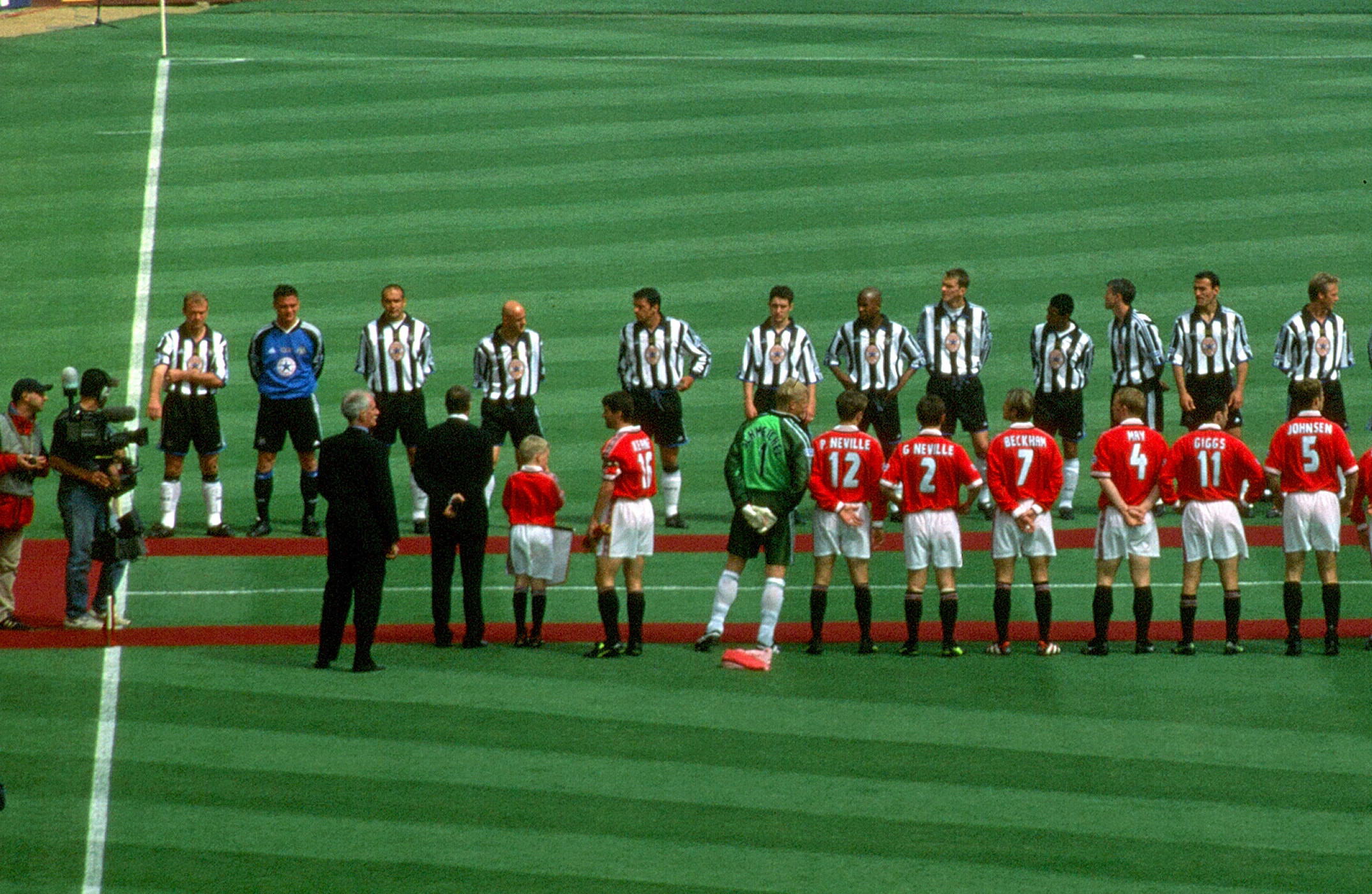
The teams line up for the national anthem and presentations ahead of the final.

Manchester United decided to rest several star players for the match so that they could be fit for the Champions League final against Bayern Munich four days later. Midfielders Roy Keane and Paul Scholes were suspended for that match, so they were paired in central midfield; their deputy for the match against Bayern Munich, Nicky Butt, was left out of the matchday squad entirely to guard him against injury. Top scorer Dwight Yorke was dropped to the bench for a similar reason, while first-choice centre-back Jaap Stam was named among the substitutes to give him a chance to prove his fitness after an Achilles tendon injury. Denis Irwin missed the match due to suspension after being sent off against Liverpool in the Premier League on 5 May and was replaced in the starting line-up by Phil Neville. Several players, including Scholes, David Beckham and Gary Neville, were suffering from a flu virus in the lead-up to the game, and were still suffering the effects on matchday, but were all deemed fit enough to play. Henning Berg was injured, so Ronny Johnsen and David May started in defence.

For Newcastle United, the FA Cup final was their last game of the season, meaning that they were uninhibited in their squad selection for the match; however, manager Ruud Gullit's final team was unpredictable and the players were unsure as to who would be picked until the day of the game. Goalkeeper Steve Harper recalled being unsure of whether it would be himself or Shay Given who would start in goal, midfielder Rob Lee said he had "resigned [himself] to not playing in the final", and right-back Warren Barton said he thought he was "in the team until the Wednesday"; Harper was ultimately selected in goal, while the right-back position was given to 20-year-old Andy Griffin, who had the job of marking Manchester United winger Ryan Giggs, having performed a similar role against Tottenham's David Ginola in the semi-final. According to the BBC, the biggest selection dilemma for Gullit was whom to pick to play up front alongside captain Alan Shearer: Georgian Ketsbaia or Scottish forward Duncan Ferguson, who was due for an operation on a herniated groin two days later. Ketsbaia was selected to start, with Ferguson named as a substitute.

=== Kits ===
Manchester United wore their first-choice kit of red shirts, white shorts and black socks for the final. Had Newcastle worn their traditional first-choice kit, there would have been a clash between the two sides' socks; however, Gullit requested that his players wear white socks with black trim rather than their usual black socks with white trim, citing the success of his former teams who had also worn white socks.

== Match ==
=== Summary ===
==== First half ====
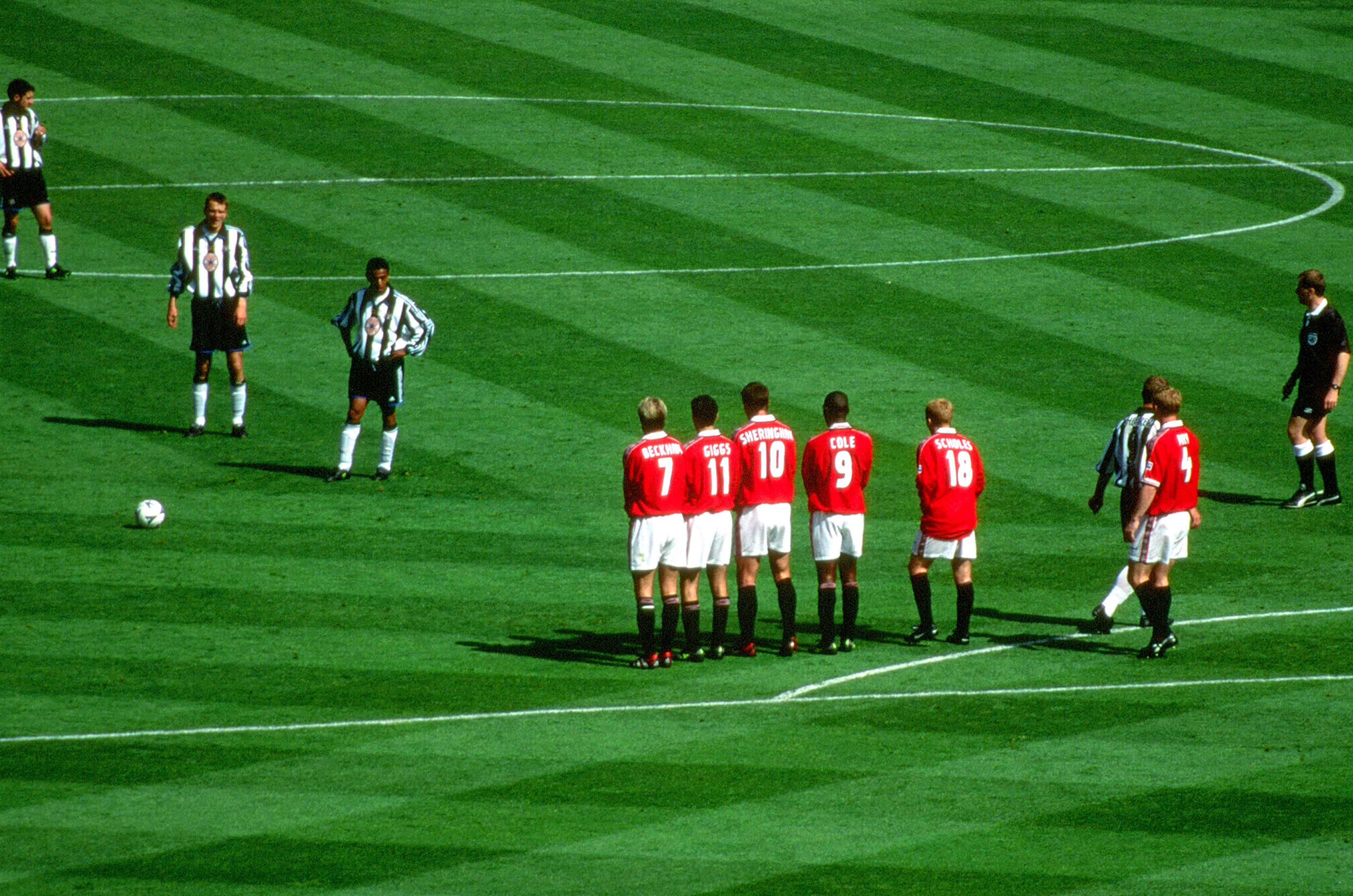
Newcastle's Nolberto Solano prepares to take a free kick on the edge of the Manchester United box.

Newcastle United kicked off the match, attacking from east to west, and fashioned the first chance after three minutes; Shearer's header to Nolberto Solano allowed the Peruvian to volley on target, but the strike was not clean and Manchester United goalkeeper Schmeichel gathered it at the second attempt. Meanwhile, tackles from Dietmar Hamann and Gary Speed on Scholes and Keane both produced injuries, but while Hamann was able to continue with a dead leg he sustained in the challenge (and picked up a yellow card for a late tackle on Phil Neville a couple of minutes later), Keane had hurt his left ankle and had to be substituted. Since the usual central midfield stand-in, Nicky Butt, was being rested for the Champions League final, Alex Ferguson chose to bring on forward Teddy Sheringham; he would play in attack alongside Cole, while Beckham would move into central midfield and Ole Gunnar Solskjær was moved from up front to the right wing.

Ninety-six seconds later, Manchester United took the lead. From a free kick just inside their own half, Beckham passed to Scholes, who gave it back to David May; May passed forwards to Andy Cole, who turned away from Dabizas and Hamann before aiming a pass towards Giggs on the left wing, only to find Sheringham in the ball's path. Sheringham played the ball delicately past Lee, who had come in for a tackle, then through the legs of Speed to Scholes, who feinted to shoot, only to pass the ball back to Sheringham, who had continued his run into the penalty area, and his shot went through Harper's legs into the net for the opening goal. Further chances fell to Solskjær, Cole and Sheringham in the first half, but all were unable to convert their efforts. Newcastle's best chance of the half fell to Hamann, a powerfully hit long-range shot just being diverted away from goal by Schmeichel.

==== Second half ====
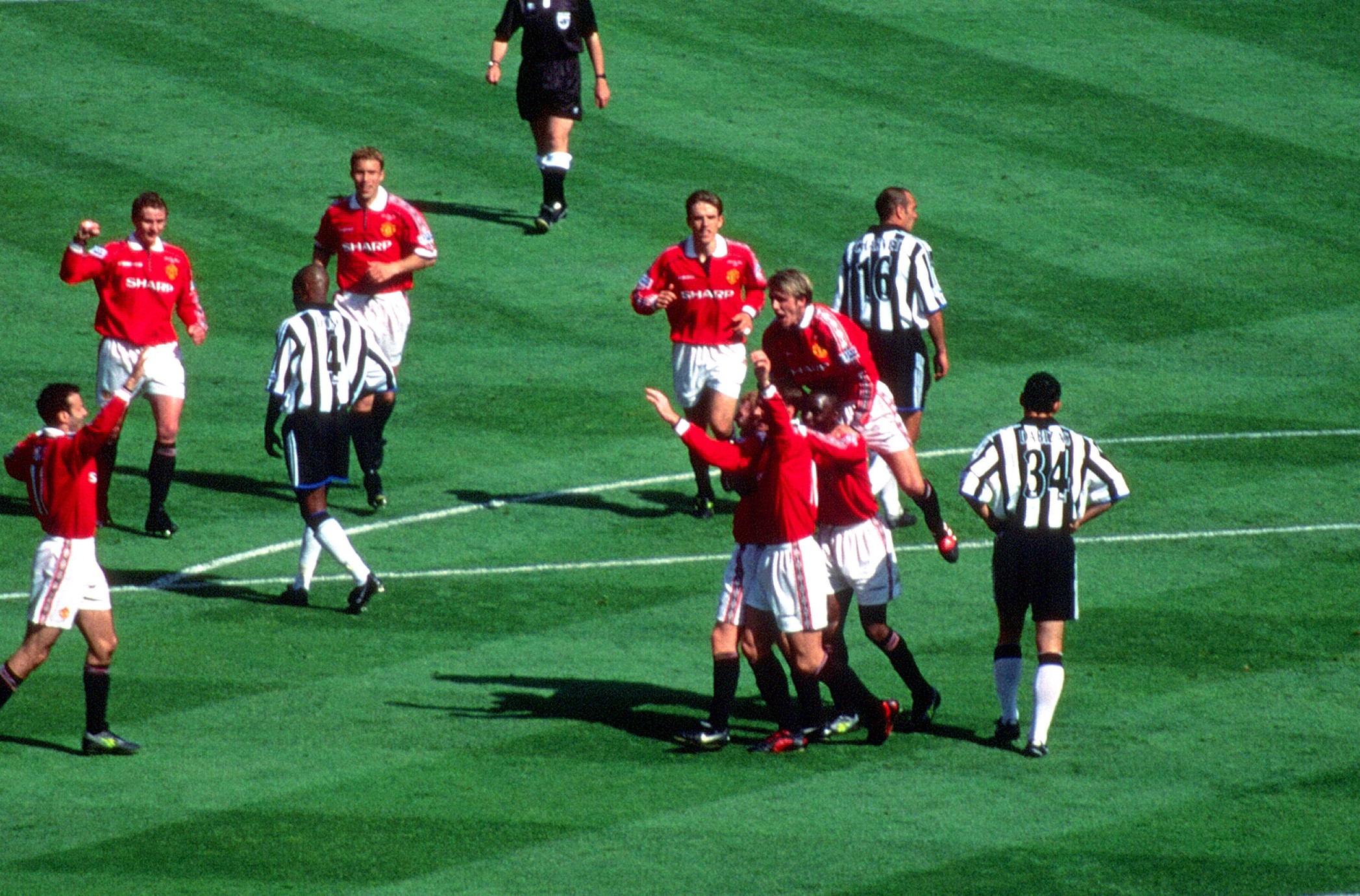
Manchester United's players celebrate Paul Scholes' goal early in the second half to put them 2–0 up.

By half-time, Hamann's injury had left him barely able to walk and he told Gullit he could not continue in the match; the two got into an argument in which Gullit accused Hamann of lacking commitment before deciding to bring on Duncan Ferguson in Hamann's place. Eight minutes into the half, Manchester United scored a second goal. A long ball from Solskjær was chased by Ryan Giggs, but he was beaten to it by Dabizas, who attempted to clear. Solskjær beat Didier Domi to Dabizas' clearance and passed to Sheringham on the edge of the penalty area. With his back to goal, Sheringham rolled the ball into the path of Scholes, who shot underneath Harper from 20 yards. Late in the game, Newcastle's Silvio Marić was one-on-one with Schmeichel but screwed his close-range shot wide of the Dane's right-hand post, and the game finished 2–0 to Manchester United.

=== Details ===
22 May 1999
15:00 BST

Manchester United	2–0	Newcastle United
Sheringham 11'; Scholes 53'	Report

Wembley Stadium, London
Attendance: 79,101
Referee: Peter Jones (Leicestershire)

Manchester United	Newcastle United

GK	1	(Denmark) Peter Schmeichel
RB	2	(England) Gary Neville
CB	4	(England) David May
CB	5	(Norway) Ronny Johnsen
LB	12	(England) Phil Neville
DM	16	(Republic of Ireland) Roy Keane (c)	(substituted off) 9'
RM	7	(England) David Beckham
CM	18	(England) Paul Scholes	(substituted off) 78'
LM	11	(Wales) Ryan Giggs
CF	9	(England) Andy Cole	(substituted off) 60'
CF	20	(Norway) Ole Gunnar Solskjær
Substitutes:
GK	17	(Netherlands) Raimond van der Gouw
DF	6	(Netherlands) Jaap Stam	(substituted on) 78'
MF	15	(Sweden) Jesper Blomqvist
FW	10	(England) Teddy Sheringham	(substituted on) 9'
FW	19	(Trinidad and Tobago) Dwight Yorke	(substituted on) 60'
Manager:
(Scotland) Alex Ferguson

GK	13	(England) Steve Harper
CB	16	(France) Laurent Charvet
CB	34	(Greece) Nikos Dabizas
CB	38	(England) Andy Griffin
DM	12	(Germany) Dietmar Hamann	(yellow card) 5'	(substituted off) 46'
RM	24	(Peru) Nolberto Solano		(substituted off) 68'
CM	7	(England) Rob Lee
CM	11	(Wales) Gary Speed
LM	4	(France) Didier Domi
SS	14	(Georgia (country)) Temur Ketsbaia		(substituted off) 79'
CF	9	(England) Alan Shearer (c)
Substitutes:
GK	1	(Republic of Ireland) Shay Given
DF	2	(England) Warren Barton
MF	10	(Croatia) Silvio Marić		(substituted on) 68'
MF	17	(Scotland) Stephen Glass		(substituted on) 79'
FW	20	(Scotland) Duncan Ferguson		(substituted on) 46'
Manager:
(Netherlands) Ruud Gullit

Man of the Match

- Teddy Sheringham (Manchester United)

Match officials

- Assistant referees:
  - Philip Sharp (Hertfordshire)
  - Dave Babski (Lincolnshire)
- Fourth official: Mike Riley (West Yorkshire)

Match rules

- 90 minutes
- 30 minutes of extra-time if necessary
- Penalty shoot-out if scores still level
- Five named substitutes, of which three may be used

=== Statistics ===
Statistic	Manchester United	Newcastle United
Total shots	15	11
Shots on target	4	3
Corner kicks	4	4
Fouls committed	12	18
Offsides	2	2
Yellow cards	0	1
Red cards	0	0

== Post-match ==
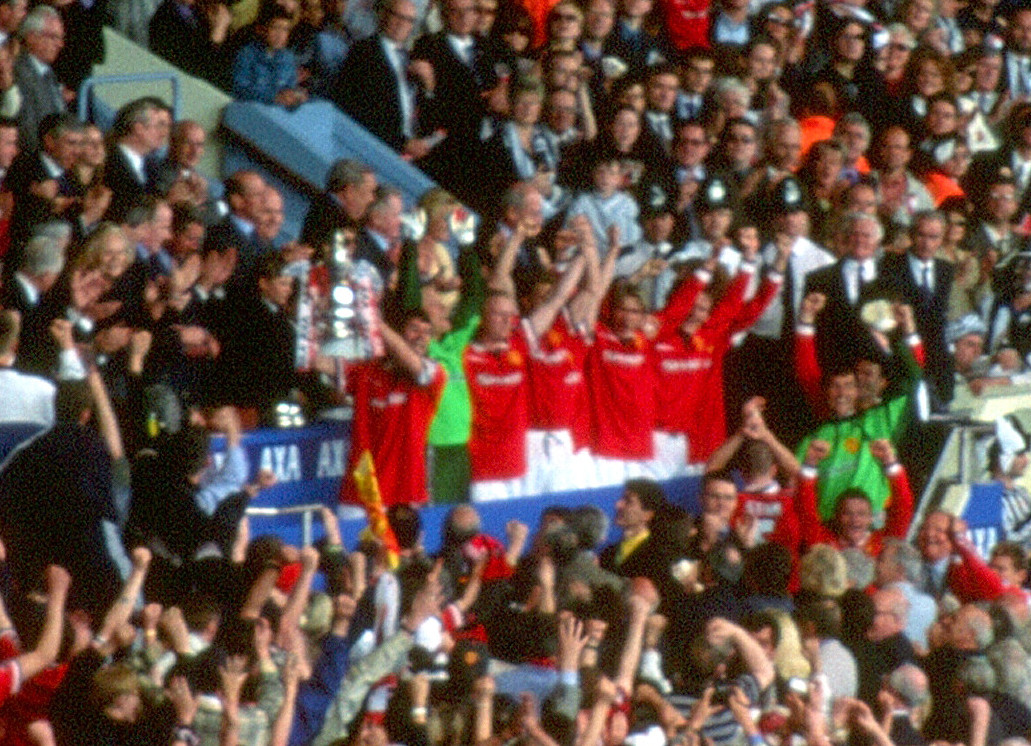
Despite being substituted early in the game, Roy Keane received the FA Cup for Manchester United.

Although Peter Schmeichel had taken over as captain after Roy Keane was substituted during the game, Keane led the Manchester United team up to the Royal Box to receive the FA Cup from the Prince of Wales (now Charles III).

After the match, Alex Ferguson praised Teddy Sheringham for his immediate impact after being brought on to replace Keane, saying: "Teddy was magnificent. He has proved a point today. He was the key to victory." He also complimented David Beckham on his performance in central midfield after Keane's withdrawal: "Beckham took over Keane's role and was absolutely magnificent... People say that going to Barcelona without Roy Keane will be a major hurdle, but I don't think so now." Ryan Giggs recognised the importance of scoring the first goal early in the game, saying: "It helped getting the early goal then the second. It was hard for Newcastle to get back into the game with the weather like that. After the quick goal we could relax and hit Newcastle on the break." Meanwhile, Newcastle manager Ruud Gullit was pleased with the effort his players had put in, but bemoaned their mistakes that allowed Manchester United an easy victory: "We were punished for our mistakes. The effort was right. The players worked hard and I can't ask for more, but every time we were on top we made a mistake and that cost us two goals. In the end we had to be thankful they did not get three, four or five."

Some of Newcastle's fans were less magnanimous in defeat than their manager, as police in Newcastle reported more than 50 arrests related to violent conduct in the city centre following the match. A crowd of about 500 people had to be dispersed through the use of batons, dogs and horses. Similar incidents had been reported after Newcastle's cup final defeat the year before, but Inspector Jerry Barker of Northumbria Police said the situation had been brought under control quicker this time.

Having claimed an unprecedented third Double in six seasons, Manchester United went on to beat Bayern Munich in the Champions League final in Barcelona four days later to claim the Treble, a feat never before achieved by an English club. Their FA Cup triumph would also have qualified them for the 1999 FA Charity Shield and the 1999–2000 UEFA Cup, which had absorbed the recently-defunct UEFA Cup Winners' Cup from the following season onwards, but their position as league winners meant that they had already qualified for the Charity Shield and the higher-tier Champions League; therefore, the other place in the Charity Shield went to league runners-up Arsenal, while the UEFA Cup place usually reserved for the cup winners went to Newcastle as cup runners-up.

Manchester United decided not to defend their FA Cup title the following season, having instead been invited to compete in the inaugural FIFA Club World Championship in Brazil. The Football Association (FA) encouraged the club to take part in the new tournament as they believed it would help their bid to host the 2006 FIFA World Cup. Alex Ferguson initially suggested that The FA could allow his team a bye to a later round of the competition to help alleviate the fixture congestion that would arise from entering both competitions, but the FA suggested that Manchester United simply pull out of the FA Cup altogether, putting the club in what chairman Martin Edwards called a "no-win" situation. Edwards said: "We're going to get criticised whatever we do. If we don't go people will say that we are selfish and only looking after ourselves and not prepared to help the 2006 World Cup bid. But we will also be criticised if we say we're not going to compete in the FA Cup." The offer was also criticised by Manchester United fans; Andy Walsh of the Independent Manchester United Supporters' Association said, "They've shown very little offer of help in the past when United have looked to ease their fixture congestion. This blinding conversion is all to do with the 2006 campaign."

The club ultimately accepted The FA's offer on 30 June, but they were given until the date of the draw for the second round on 28 October to finalise that decision. Their place in the third round was given to a "lucky loser", determined by drawing one team out of the 20 losers from the second round; that team was Darlington of the Third Division, who were drawn away to Aston Villa. Manchester United were knocked out of the Club World Championship in the group stage after losing to hosts Vasco da Gama and drawing with Mexican club Necaxa, their only victory coming against Australian representatives South Melbourne. It later turned out that their FA Cup sacrifice was in vain, as FIFA suggested that their participation in the competition would have no bearing on the vote to host the 2006 World Cup, which was ultimately won by the German Football Association.

Of the 20 finals played between 1996 and 2015, this final was ranked 19th by The Daily Telegraph for failing to live up to the promise of the game's early action.
