= Meca Medina and Majcen v Commission =

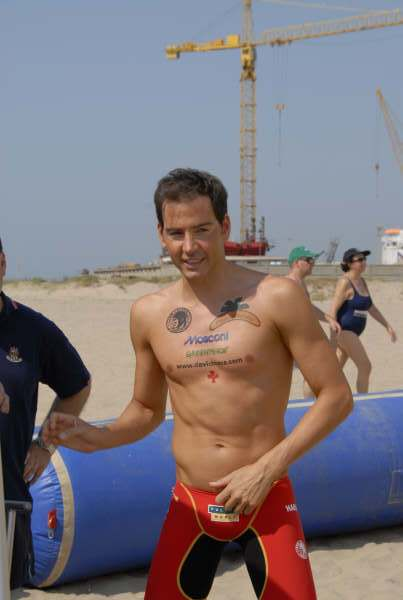
David Meca

Meca Medina and Majcen v Commission (2006) C-519/04 P was a landmark judgement in the European Court of Justice that established primacy of EU law over sports federations. The ruling concerned David Meca-Medina and Igor Majcen, long-distance swimmers from Spain and Slovenia and their failed drug tests. The case was wide-reaching and important because it established the scope and nature that individual laws by sporting regulators, league operators and individual associations in Europe could impose their own rules and if they were in direct conflict with EU treaties, acquis or judgements by the European Courts of Justice.

== Facts ==
=== Walrave and Koch ===
Before 2006, sports in Europe had what was called a sporting exception because of the case of two Dutch cyclists in Walrave and Koch (Walrave and Koch v Association Union Cycliste Internationale) at the European Court of Justice in 1974 which was ruling whether organisations (such as the UCI in this case) could be held to the same discrimination rules as member states. It was clear from Treaty provisions 7 (the prohibition on nationality-based discrimination), 48 (presumption of free movement of (employed) workers) and 59 (presumption of free movement of (self-employed) workers) that no EEC member state could discriminate in this way, but it was untested in European courts whether a regulatory or sanctioning organisation could be held to the same rules.

The European Courts of Justice stated that its rules for member states did not apply to an organisation that sanctioned and regulated a certain sport because the rules were essentially made for EU economic activity and as these were rules consisting of a purely sporting character, were not subject to Community law, even if they restrained the economic freedom of certain professional or semi-professional athletes.:

These Community provisions on freedom of movement for persons and freedom to provide services not only apply to the action of public authorities but extend also to rules of any other nature aimed at regulating gainful employment and the provision of services in a collective manner. However, the prohibitions enacted by these provisions of the Treaty do not affect rules concerning questions which are of purely sporting interest and, as such, have nothing to do with economic activity.

The general objective of anti-doping rules relating to sport is to combat doping in order for competitive sport to be conducted fairly and includes the need to safeguard equal chances for athletes, athletes' health, the integrity and objectivity of competitive sport and ethical values in sport. In addition, given that penalties are necessary to ensure enforcement of the doping ban, their effect on athletes' freedom of action must be considered to be, in principle, inherent itself in the anti-doping rules.

Since, moreover, working conditions in the various Member States are governed by means of provisions laid down in law or regulations and sometimes by agreements and other acts concluded by private persons, to limit the prohibitions in question to acts of a public authority would risk creating inequality in their application.

This ruling states that European law only applies to "economic activities" within the overall meaning of Article 2 of the Treaty. In Walrave, the Court held that EU law did not apply to rules governing the composition of national sports teams and it was not for the ECJ to assess whether or not such rules were disproportionate. This in effect meant that regulators in sport could continue regulating in a way that they felt best without adhering to certain rules by the EU.

=== The Bosman ruling ===
For more information see Bosman ruling

One of the first challenges to the Walrave and Koch ruling was by the Belgian footballer Jean-Marc Bosman. Bosman was a midfielder who joined Standard Liège in 1983. After failing to establish himself there and RFC Liège his contract expired in 1990. Dunkerque wanted to sign him but would not meet RFCL's fee, the Belgian club then cut Bosman's pay by 75%. Bosman's lawyers including Jean-Louis Dupont sued the club, the Belgian FA and UEFA for restraint of trade and in December 1995 the EU court said out-of-contract players can move on free transfers and banned limits on the number of foreign EU players under the EU Restraint of Trade law.

Although Bosman's victory was pyrrhic ending in alcoholism and incarceration the effect it had was it reversed parts of the Walrave and Koch ruling namely that contractual restrictions on freedom to conduct business could not be an exception. Since Bosman, other cases have been brought to the ECJ like Deliège which has weakened the sporting exception further.

=== David Meca-Medina and Igor Majcen ===
David Meca-Medina and Igor Majcen were long distance swimmers from Spain and Slovenia respectively who after finishing first and second in a World Cup race in Brazil both had positive anti-doping test for Nandrolone, a prohibited anabolic steroid, and were banned for a period of four years by a decision of FINA's Doping Panel of 8 August 1999. Meca-Medina and Majcen then appealed the decision before the Court of Arbitration for Sport, which confirmed the suspension on 29 February 2000 before reconsidering it and subsequently reducing it to a period of two years.

=== The EEC and the EU ===
The 1974 ruling of Walrave was made in a different version of the EU. The Treaty of Rome of 1957 established the European Economic Community or "Common Market" as it was known and its scope was far narrower than the EU is today. It was primarily an economic tool and had as its aim the economic union of its member nations. When the Maastricht Treaty was signed in 1993 the aims of the supranational organisation was enlarged and incorporated other institutions like the Court of Justice of the European Union, the European Central Bank, and the European Parliament. This was enough to convince the court that previous cases based on Walrave could be modified or supplanted.

=== Submissions ===
Meca-Medina and Majcen (also represented by Jean-Louis DUPONT) subsequently filed a case against the executive body of the European Union, the European Commission, that the rules adopted by the International Olympic Committee concerning doping control were incompatible with the EC rules on competition and freedom to provide services. As the rules at the time stated, European law mostly (apart from the above Bosman and Deliège cases) only applied to economic activities within Article 2 of the Treaty. On 30 May 2001, the appellants filed a complaint with the Commission, stating that anti-doping rules breached articles 49, 81 and 82 of the EC Treaty. Article 82 states:

Any abuse by one or more undertakings of a dominant position within the common market or in a substantial part of it shall be prohibited as incompatible with the common market insofar as it may affect trade between Member States.

They argued that the fixing of the limit for Nandrolone at two nanogrammes per millilitre of urine was a concerted practice between the IOC and the 27 laboratories accredited by it and that the anti-competitive nature of that practice was reinforced by the fact that the tribunals responsible for the settlement of sports disputes by arbitration were not independent of the IOC.

== Judgment ==
The ECJ Court of First Instance held that doping was a sporting not an economic issue. The judgement was appealed and the appellate court held that the court of First Instance had erred in law when it held that the anti-doping rules at issue did not fall within the scope of Articles 49, 81 and 82 of the EC Treaty. Secondly, they disputed the assessment made by the Court of First Instance according to which anti-doping rules are purely sporting rules and therefore fall outside the scope of the EC Treaty. This essentially said that activity that takes the form of paid employment for professional or semi-professional sportsmen was covered under law in the treaty.

== Significance ==
Before Meca-Medina a sporting rule which had an economic effect was immune from challenge merely because it was a sporting rule. Currently, any sporting rule which restricts competition will need to be shown to have effects no more far reaching than its immediate objectives. It is significant for its departure from previous sports law because cases are decided on a case-by-case basis and reflects that Europe's sporting bodies have economic effects and are open to scrutiny by the competition authorities. Although, if sporting bodies can illustrate that the objectives pursued by its rules are legitimate and proportionate in their effects then the ruling should have no effect.

Although it is seen in a positive light by many for the above reasons, some have disagreed. UEFA stated "Without question, the final judgment is unsatisfactory..." And continued suggesting that the EU may have opened floodgates to more cases in the future:

Encouraged by the judgment in Meca-Medina, it is to be expected that complainants will now amplify arguments to the effect that sports rules and practices have "disproportionate" effects or are "not limited to what is necessary for the proper conduct of competitive sport" and, in this way, "prove" a violation of competition law. It seems the European Court of Justice (unlike the CFI) has now declared its interest and willingness to examine all manner of such arguments in the future. The European Commission may also have a harder job in rejecting vexatious claims under competition law.

== See also ==
- EU law
