= Glazer ownership of Manchester United =

Account of the Glazer family's tenure as owners of Manchester United Football Club

Manchester United Football Club is an English football club based in Old Trafford, Greater Manchester. The club was formed as Newton Heath LYR Football Club, the works team of the Lancashire and Yorkshire Railway depot in Newton Heath, in 1878. The club split from the railway company in 1892 and remained under private ownership for almost 100 years, changing its name to Manchester United after being saved from bankruptcy in 1902. The club was the subject of takeover bids from media tycoon Robert Maxwell in 1984 and property trader Michael Knighton in 1989, before going public in 1991; they received another takeover bid from the Rupert Murdoch-owned television company British Sky Broadcasting in 1998 before Malcolm Glazer's stake was announced in September 2003.

By the end of 2003, Glazer had increased his shareholding from 3.17% to around 15%, which he almost doubled in the year up to October 2004. His acquisition of John Magnier and J. P. McManus's 28.7% stake in May 2005 pushed his own up to around 57%, well over the 30% threshold that would force him to launch a takeover bid. A few days later, he took control of 75% of the club's shares, allowing him to delist the company from the London Stock Exchange, and within a month, the Glazers took 98% ownership of the club via their Red Football parent company, forcing a squeeze-out of the remaining 2%. The final purchase price of the club totalled almost £800 million.

Most of the capital used by Glazer to purchase Manchester United came in the form of loans, the majority of which were secured against the club's assets, incurring interest payments of over £60 million per annum. The remainder came in the form of payment in kind loans, which were later sold to hedge funds. Manchester United was not liable for the PIKs, which were held by Red Football Joint Venture and were secured on that company's shares in Red Football (and thus the club). The interest on the PIKs rolled up at 14.25% per annum. Despite this, the Glazers did not pay down any of the PIK loans in the first five years they owned the club. In January 2010, the club carried out a successful £500 million bond issue, and by March 2010, the PIKs stood at around £207 million. The PIKs were eventually paid off in November 2010 by unspecified means. In August 2012, as part of further refinancing, the Glazers sold a number of shares in Manchester United in an initial public offering (IPO) on the New York Stock Exchange (NYSE).

Some Manchester United fans opposed Glazer's takeover of the club, particularly once they realised the level of debt that the club would have to take on after having been debt-free for so many years. Due to this fans took to the streets to protest against the Glazers. Disgruntled fans launched the football club F.C. United of Manchester in 2005, which entered the North West Counties Football League and played in the sixth tier National League North from 2015 to 2019. Since 2005, the Manchester United Supporters' Trust have worked on ways of returning ownership of the club to supporters, including a failed attempt in 2010 to purchase the club in a billion-pound takeover bid alongside a group of wealthy Manchester United fans dubbed the "Red Knights". Other organizations such as the Independent Manchester United Supporters' Association and The 1958 have made additional attempts to varying success.

== Background ==
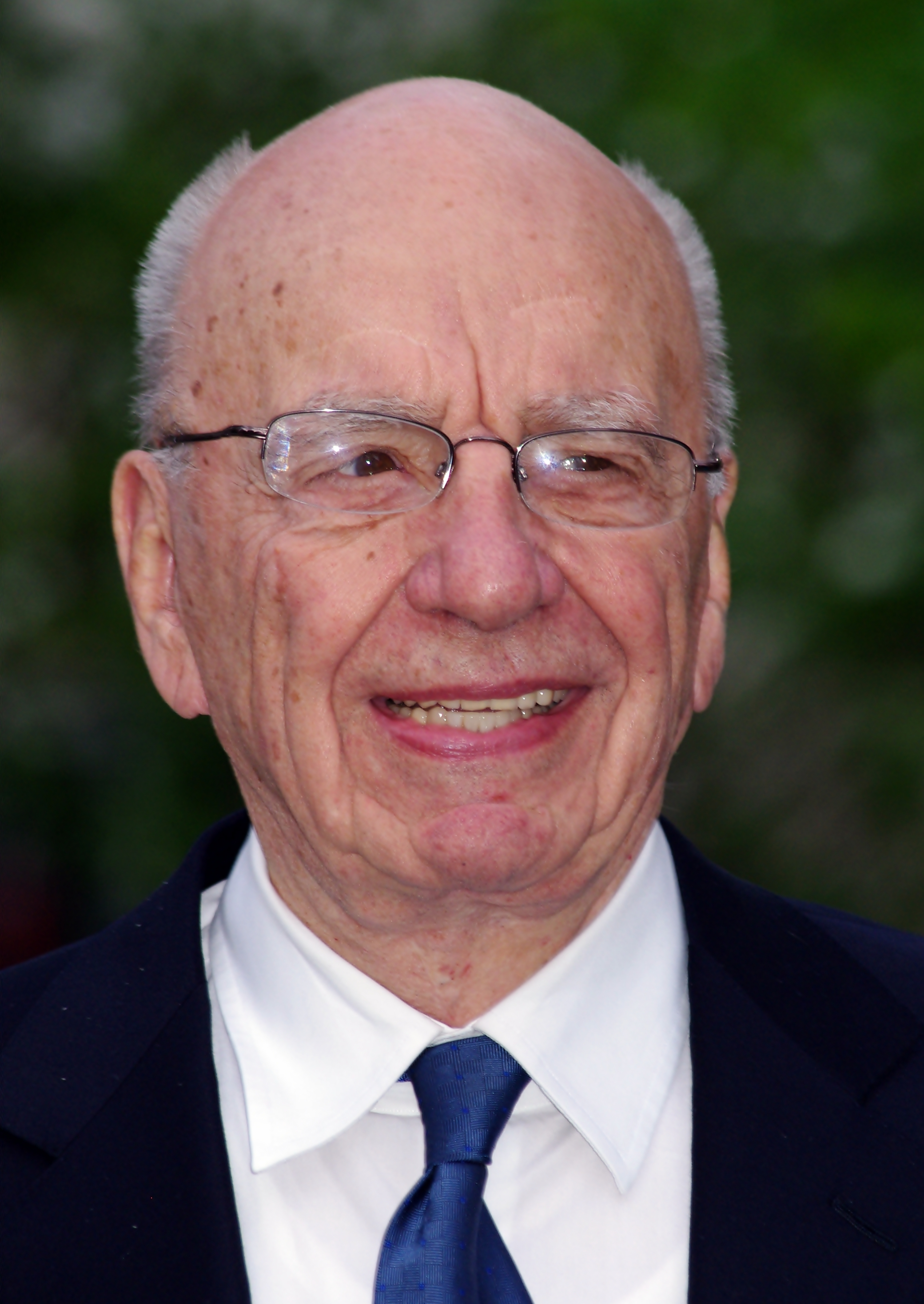
Manchester United was the subject of a takeover bid from Rupert Murdoch's BSkyB in 1998.

Manchester United was formed as Newton Heath LYR F.C. in 1878 by the workers in the Carriage and Wagon Works of the Lancashire and Yorkshire Railway's Newton Heath depot. In 1901, the club was in over £2,500 of debt and facing a winding-up order; however, they were saved by local brewer John Henry Davies, who changed their name to Manchester United in 1902. After Davies' death in 1927, the club fell into financial difficulties once again, but James W. Gibson stepped in as a new financial benefactor in 1931. Gibson himself died in 1951, but while his widow, Violet, inherited the ownership of the club, its control passed to director and former player Harold Hardman.

Meanwhile, a local businessman named Louis Edwards began accruing shares in Manchester United and was eventually made chairman on Hardman's death in 1965. His son, Martin Edwards, purchased a percentage of shares from Alan Gibson – son of former owner James Gibson – and became the majority shareholder and chairman when Louis Edwards died in 1980. During Martin Edwards' time as chairman, Manchester United was the subject of several takeover bids; the first came from media tycoon Robert Maxwell, who bid £10 million in February 1984, but the sale fell through before any serious talks could take place. In 1989, property magnate Michael Knighton was on the verge of completing a £20 million takeover, but his financial backers pulled out at the last minute and he had to be content with merely a seat on the board.

Manchester United was floated on the stock market in 1991, and they received yet another takeover bid in 1998, this time from Rupert Murdoch's BSkyB. The Manchester United board accepted a £623 million offer, but the takeover was blocked by the Monopolies and Mergers Commission at the final hurdle in April 1999. A few years later, a power struggle emerged between the club's manager, Sir Alex Ferguson, and his horse-racing partners, John Magnier and J. P. McManus, who had gradually become the largest shareholders via their company, Cubic Expression. In a dispute that stemmed from contested ownership of the horse Rock of Gibraltar, Magnier and McManus attempted to have Ferguson removed from his position as manager, and the board responded by approaching investors to attempt to reduce the Irishmen's influence.

Meanwhile, Avram Glazer – the son of Malcolm Glazer – was looking into investment in European football. The Glazer family already owned several businesses in the United States and had purchased the Tampa Bay Buccaneers National Football League franchise in 1995. They convinced the local government to fund a new stadium for the Buccaneers in 1998 and the franchise won its first Super Bowl in January 2003.

== Acquisition of shares and gaining control ==
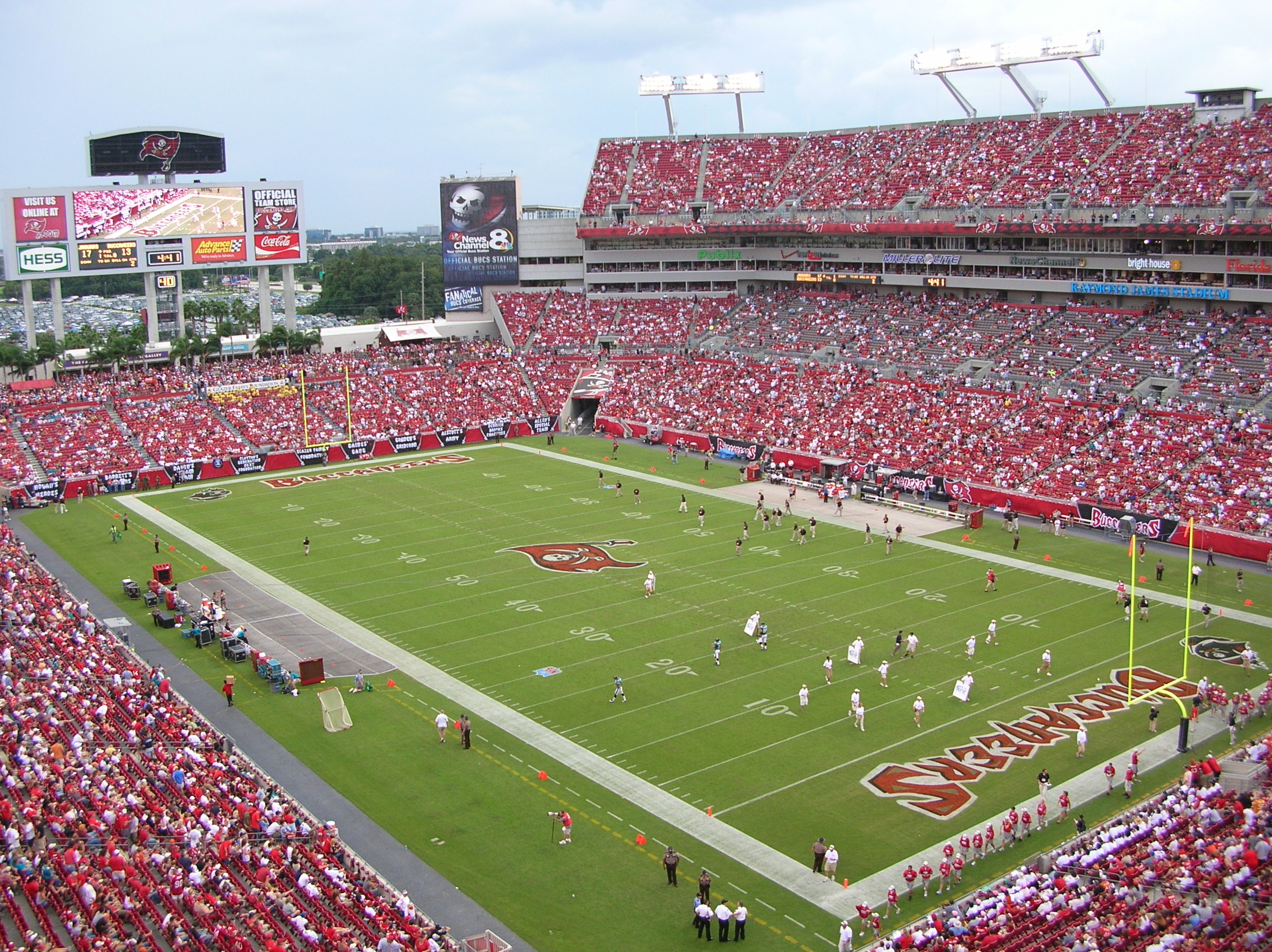
The construction of Raymond James Stadium in Tampa, Florida was one of the first major changes made by the Glazers after their acquisition of the Tampa Bay Buccaneers.

Following the Manchester United board's search for new investors, the Glazers purchased their first tranche of Manchester United shares on 2 March 2003, spending around £9 million on a 2.9% stake, which they purchased through a holding company called Red Football. On 26 September 2003, it was reported that they had increased their share to 3.17%, taking their shareholding above the 3% threshold that required them to inform the club's management. There had already been considerable speculation about the possibility of a takeover of the club, either by the Glazers or by one of several other interested parties. By 20 October, they had increased their shareholding to 8.93%, and on 29 November, it was reported that they owned around 15% of the club and had met David Gill, its chief executive, to discuss their intentions.

On 12 February 2004, the Glazers increased their stake in the club to 16.31% and the following day's Financial Times reported that they had instructed Commerzbank to explore a takeover bid. The club's share price increased by 5% that day, valuing the club at a total of £741 million. The Glazers increased their shareholding to over 19% the following June, although they were still not the largest shareholders. Their shareholding continued to increase, nearing 30% by October 2004. Upon reaching 30%, they would have to launch a formal takeover bid. In February 2005, over 400 Manchester United fans held a protest at Old Trafford against a potential Glazer takeover.

On 12 May 2005, Red Football announced that it had reached an agreement with shareholders J. P. McManus and John Magnier to purchase Cubic Expression's 28.7% stake in the club, which gave the Glazers a controlling stake with just under 57% of the club's shares. They then managed to secure the stake of the third-largest stakeholder, Scottish mining entrepreneur Harry Dobson, taking their share total to 62% of the club. By 13 May, the Glazers had bought a further 12.8% stake, taking their total ownership to 74.81%, just shy of the 75% threshold that would allow them to end the club's public limited company (PLC) status and delist it from the London Stock Exchange. On 16 May, the Glazers took their shareholding in Manchester United to 75.7%, and a month later, on 22 June, they removed the club's shares from the stock exchange for the first time in 14 years.

The Glazers' shareholding increased gradually to 76.2% by 23 May, when they made their final offer of 300 pence per share, with a deadline of 3 p.m. on 13 June. On 26 May, the Manchester United board wrote to the remaining shareholders indicating their intention to sell their own shares and advising the others to follow suit; in the same letter, chairman Sir Roy Gardner and non-executive directors Ian Much and Jim O'Neill offered their resignations. On 7 June, Avram Glazer and his brothers Joel and Bryan were appointed to the Manchester United board as non-executive directors. Despite the board's encouragement, the Glazers' share in the club had only reached 97.3% by 14 June, short of the 97.6% threshold required for a compulsory buyout of all remaining shareholders, prompting them to extend the deadline on their offer to purchase the remaining shares until 27 June. A statement released on 28 June said that Red Football's shareholding had reached 98% (259,950,194 shares), prompting a squeeze-out of the remaining shareholders. The final valuation of the club was almost £790 million (approximately $1.5 billion at the exchange rate at the time).

== Aftermath ==
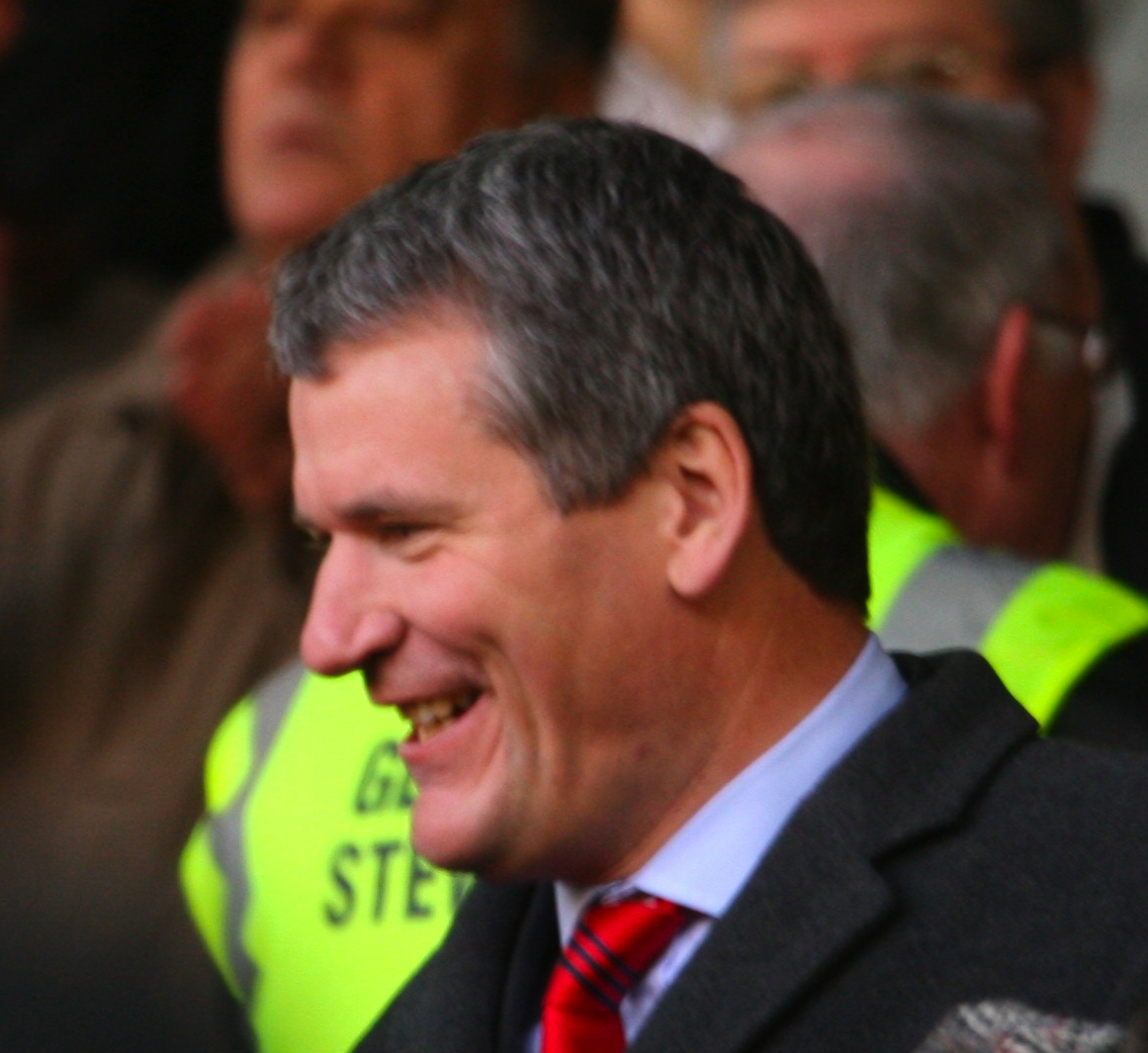
The Glazers retained David Gill as chief executive of Manchester United after taking control in 2005.

On 29 June 2005, on their first visit to Old Trafford after the takeover was completed, Joel, Bryan and Avram Glazer were met with protests by around 300 Manchester United fans who opposed the club's new ownership. Around 100 members of Greater Manchester Police were called to the stadium in an attempt to quell any violence, but there were reports of missiles being thrown at the police vans and chants of "die, Glazer, die"; two people were arrested. The vice-chairman of Shareholders United, Sean Bones, declared that "the Glazer family are the enemies of Manchester United". Club director and former player Bobby Charlton issued a public apology to the Glazers for the reception they received. In further response to the takeover, a group of Manchester United supporters created a new club called F.C. United of Manchester. This so-called "phoenix club" was accepted into the North West Counties Football League second division, six promotions away from The Football League, and secured promotion in each of its first three seasons, twice as league champions.

After the takeover, Manchester United continued to thrive, with the 2005–06 season seeing Old Trafford's capacity being expanded and a lucrative new shirt sponsorship deal signed in April 2006 with American company AIG (which had a large stake in a hedge fund company that helped to fund Glazer's takeover of the club). Increased revenue from TV rights to each competition the club participates in, as well as its various sponsorship deals, also boosted the club's profitability. This came despite fears among many supporters that the debt incurred in buying the club could lead to insolvency.

Contrary to the fears of many fans, the Glazers took action to ensure that Gill and veteran manager Sir Alex Ferguson remained at Manchester United, citing the duo's success with the club. In 2006, Malcolm Glazer's other two sons, Kevin and Edward, and his daughter, Darcie, were appointed to the Manchester United board as non-executive directors.

== Refinancing ==
The debt taken on by the Glazers to finance the takeover was split between the club and the family; between £265 million and £275 million was secured against Manchester United's assets, putting the club into debt for the first time since James Gibson saved them in 1931. This loan was provided by three American hedge funds: Citadel, Och-Ziff Capital Management and Perry Capital. The total amount was £660 million, on which interest payments came to £62 million a year. The club stated, "The value of Manchester United has increased in the last year, which is why lenders want to invest in the club ... This move represents good housekeeping and it ensures that Sir Alex Ferguson will be provided with sufficient funds to compete in the transfer market." The Manchester United Supporters Trust responded, "The amount of money needed to be repaid overall is huge ... The interest payment is one thing but what about the actual £660 million? It is difficult to see how these sums can be reached without significant increases in ticket prices, which, as we always suspected, means the fans will effectively be paying for someone to borrow money to own their club." Under the terms of the Glazers' refinancing, as they were unable to repay bondholders by 16 August 2010, the overall interest rate on the loans rose from 14.25% to 16.25%, resulting in annual payments of around £38 million.

On 11 January 2010, shortly before an announcement that Red Football's debt had increased to £716.5 million ($1.17 billion), Manchester United announced their intention to refinance the debt through a bond issue worth approximately £500 million. They managed to raise £504 million in just under two weeks, meaning that they were able to pay off almost all of the £509 million owed to international banks. The bonds were issued in two tranches, one with a coupon rate of 8.75% worth £250 million, and the other with a coupon rate of 8.375% worth $425 million. The annual interest payable on the bond came to approximately £45 million per annum, with the bond due to mature on 1 February 2017. Contained within the bond prospectus were covenants that would allow the Glazers to filter large sums of money out of the club to repay the PIKs by 2015. These include the carving out of £95 million in cash, the sale and lease-back of the Trafford Training Centre at Carrington, and the ability of the Glazers to pay themselves 50% of the consolidated net income of the club every year.

In May 2010, before the final game of the season, hundreds of Manchester United fans held a protest outside Old Trafford against the Glazer ownership.

On 16 November 2010, it was revealed that the Glazers were to pay off the remaining £220 million contained within the PIK loans by 22 November 2010. The loans were by then accruing interest at a rate of 16.25%, as the club's overall debt had exceeded its earnings before interest, taxes, depreciation and amortization (EBITDA) by more than five times. However, the club claimed that none of its own money had been put towards the repayment, raising questions as to how the Glazer family had raised the funds; suggested methods include the sale of a minority stake in the club to a third party, the sale of some or all of the family's other businesses, and – the most likely option – the refinancing of the PIKs with another loan at a lower interest rate.

== Red Knights takeover plans ==
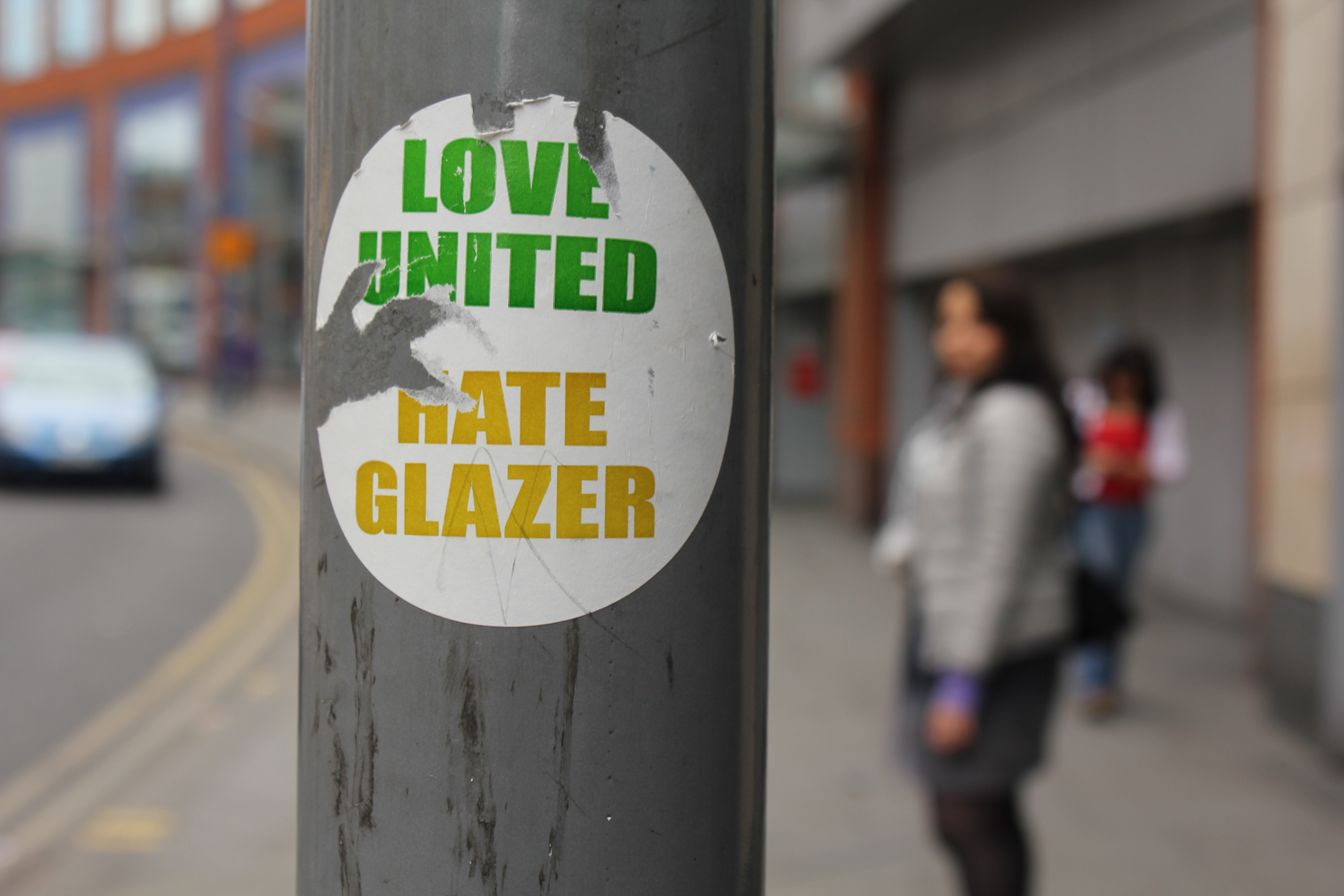
An anti-Glazer sticker on a lamppost in Manchester city centre

A fan campaign known as "Love United Hate Glazer" was formed following the family's bid to take over the club. The campaign involved the spreading of the slogan and the acronym "LUHG" around various locations via stickers and graffiti. A number of banners have also been displayed in the stands at Old Trafford.

Despite its restructuring, the announcement about the club's debt prompted vociferous protests from Manchester United fans on the weekend of 23 January 2010, both at Old Trafford and at the club's Carrington training facility. A protest was organised by the club's supporters groups, following up on the "Love United Hate Glazer" campaign that had existed since 2005, and encouraging match-going fans to wear green and gold, the colours of Manchester United's precursor club, Newton Heath. A few days later, on 30 January, reports emerged that the Manchester United Supporters' Trust had held meetings with a group of wealthy fans with a view to buying out the Glazers' controlling interest in the club. The group then met with Keith Harris, a Manchester United fan and the chairman of investment bank Seymour Pierce, to broker a takeover.

On 2 March 2010, further reports emerged that the group – dubbed the "Red Knights" – had met again to discuss the possibility of a billion-pound takeover of the club. Those present at the meeting included investment bank Goldman Sachs' chief economist and former Manchester United director Jim O'Neill and lawyer Mark Rawlinson, a partner at law firm Freshfields Bruckhaus Deringer, as well as Duncan Drasdo, the chief executive of the Manchester United Supporters' Trust, and Keith Harris, Executive Chairman of Seymour Pierce. The initial goal of the group was to increase the Supporters' Trust's membership to at least 100,000, to demonstrate the fans' support for a change in ownership. To better promote themselves, the Trust enlisted the services of Blue State Digital, the Internet strategy firm that worked on Barack Obama's 2008 presidential election campaign.

Later that day, Manchester United announced that their gross debt for the final three months of 2009 totalled £507.5 million, a reduction of £30.6 million compared to the same period in 2008. They also reported pre-tax profits of £6.9 million, an increase of £9.6 million after making a loss of £2.7 million the previous year. This announcement was accompanied by a statement from the Glazers' spokesperson that the club was not for sale, as well as public support from David Gill, who claimed that the Glazers were "running the club the right way".

Meanwhile, membership of the Manchester United Supporters' Trust passed the 100,000 mark on 3 March, before exceeding 125,000 a week later. The green-and-gold scarf campaign also grew, with large portions of the Old Trafford crowd showing the colours. Following Manchester United's 4–0 victory over Milan in their Champions League first knockout round tie, former Manchester United player David Beckham was seen wearing a scarf that had been thrown onto the pitch; however, he later said that he was merely showing his support for Manchester United, and that the running of the club is "not [his] business". It was also claimed that United manager Alex Ferguson would be prepared to invest his own money in the Red Knights' bid, but he dismissed these reports as "absolute rubbish".

Given the amount of debt on Manchester United's books at the time, some analysts estimated in 2010 that any takeover bid would have had to total more than £2 billion, of which around £1.6 billion would be needed to match the Glazers' valuation of the club – double what they paid for the club in 2005. However, the Red Knights publicly stated that they would only pay "a fair price" when their takeover bid finally came. On 11 March 2010, the Red Knights appointed Nomura Securities as their advisers for their takeover bid. Nomura previously advised the Manchester United board before the Glazers' bid to buy the club. The Red Knights later admitted that they would not make a bid for the club before the end of the 2009–10 season, but it was believed that their preferred bid option would have involved retaining the £500 million bond issued by the Glazers. Two-thirds of a further £700 million would be provided by 30–40 wealthy Manchester United fans, with the remainder provided by fund-raising from ordinary fans. Once the club was secured, shares would then be offered to fans, allowing them to take ownership of the club. Despite these plans, the Red Knights put their takeover bid "on hold" in June 2010, citing "inflated valuation aspirations" in the media as the reason. Having already stated that they would only pay a "sensible" amount for the club, the group was thought to have baulked at the suggestion that the Glazers' valuation of the club was significantly higher than the amount they were willing to pay.

== NYSE listing and shareholders ==
In 2011, rumours surfaced that the Glazers intended to list a number of shares in Manchester United on an Asian market such as Hong Kong or Singapore, in an attempt to raise a potential £400–600 million. The Singapore flotation looked to be gaining traction in August 2011, when it emerged that the club had applied to list its shares on the Singapore Exchange; approval for the listing was given in September 2011.

In June 2012, after several months with no further developments on the Singapore front, several sources reported that the club was considering moving its share issue to the United States, and in July 2012, an application was made for the club to sell shares on the New York Stock Exchange (NYSE), with a target of raising $100 million (£64 million). More details of the sale were released at the end of July, with the club announcing that they intended to sell 16.7 million shares (approximately 10% of the club) at between $16 and $20 each, raising up to $330 million (£210 million). Shares in the club would be divided into two groups, with Class A shares sold to the public and Class B shares retained by the Glazer family.

Ahead of the opening of the IPO, concerns were raised among both investors and Manchester United supporters regarding the details of the share offering. Although the share prospectus specified that the proceeds from the sale would go towards paying down the club's debts, it was revealed that much of the money would go directly to the Glazers. Furthermore, holders of class A shares would not be entitled to a regular dividend, and the structure of the share issue meant that the Glazers' class B shares had 10 times the voting power of class A shares, essentially denying a controlling interest in the club to anyone but the Glazers. These issues drove down interest and forced a drop in the share price from the planned $16–20 each to $14 each, representing a potential total sale value of $233 million (£150 million).

The shares debuted on the NYSE on 10 August 2012, and initially showed a slight rise to $14.05 per share, but closed the day back at the offer price of $14 each, valuing the club as a whole at $2.3 billion, and making it one of the most valuable sports teams in the world. One of the biggest investors in the IPO was American billionaire George Soros, whose investment company purchased about 3.1 million class A shares (1.9% of the club), valued at $40.7 million (£25.8 million) at the time. Club records announced in November 2012 revealed that gross debt had fallen to £359.7 million after the share sale paid off £62.6 million of bonds. The club's debts were further remedied in May 2013, after a new loan deal was agreed that would save the club £10 million a year in interest payments on debts now totalling around £307 million.

In March 2014, American investment group Baron Capital purchased 24% of all of the shares available on the NYSE (equivalent to 5.8% of the entire club, but widely misreported as 2.4%). At the closing price on the day of purchase of $15.84 per share, Baron Capital's total investment was valued at $151 million (£90 million). In September 2014, Baron Capital raised its stake in the club to 9.2% of the entire club (equivalent to 37.8% of all shares available on the NYSE.)

Malcolm Glazer died on 28 May 2014 at the age of 85. His death was seen as unlikely to result in any significant changes to the operation of the club.

From 2016, the Glazers paid themselves annual dividends from the club, at over £20 million every year from 2016 to 2020. In that same period, the club's debt repayments "all but ceased", described The Daily Telegraph, while interest payments continued. While paying dividends was common in business, Manchester United were the sole Premier League club to "pay regular dividends of any kind", reported The Daily Telegraph in May 2021.

== European Super League ==
In April 2021, Joel Glazer played a major role in controversial plans to have Manchester United compete in a European Super League. Plans were announced on 18 April and were unpopular with fans. Following the withdrawal of Manchester United from the competition three days later due to heavy backlash from fans, government, and many football players, managers and pundits, protests from fans continued. On 22 April, a group of around 20 protesters invaded the club's training ground to stage a protest against the Glazers' ownership. Two days later, more than 2,000 attended a second protest outside Old Trafford to advocate for the 50+1 rule seen in German football. Joel Glazer later apologised to the team's fans, saying "[he] got it wrong", but fans told a team executive they were "disgusted, embarrassed and angry" with his actions.

Ahead of a league game against Liverpool on 2 May, a second protest outside Old Trafford took place, as well as a smaller protest outside the Lowry Hotel. The Old Trafford protest this time saw over 10,000 people in attendance; around a hundred protesters gained access to the pitch. As a result of the protests, a delayed kickoff was required for the game as players and match officials were unable to get to the stadium by the original 16:30 kickoff time. After a review, the game was postponed. It was the first time a Premier League match had been postponed because of supporter protests in the competition's history. The protest gained significant news coverage. Former Liverpool defender Jamie Carragher, and former Manchester United captains Gary Neville and Roy Keane, who were all providing punditry for Sky Sports ahead of the game, expressed support for the cause of the protesters.

== 2023–24 partial sale ==
On 22 November 2022, the Glazer family announced they were open to a potential sale of the club, either in full or in part. At the time of this announcement, the club's valuation was £3.75 billion. The announcement caused a 17% rise in the club's stock market valuation. By the deadline for the second round of bidding on 23 March 2023, offers had come from British billionaire Jim Ratcliffe and Qatari Sheikh Jassim bin Hamad bin Khalifa Al Thani for a complete take over, and American firm Elliott Investment Management for a minority stake. It was reported that the maximum bids were £4.5 billion, and did not match the Glazers' £6 billion valuation of the club. The Financial Times reported Sheikh Jassim had made an improved £5 billion offer in the third round of bidding, as well as an unknown bid by Ratcliffe. At this time, the club was valued at £2.5 billion with £640 million of debt.

On 24 August, it was reported that Jassim's fifth bid of £5 billion was still on the table, but there were growing concerns that no sale would occur. On 6 September, following reports of the sale being off following neither bidder meeting the Glazers' £10 billion valuation, the club suffered a one-day reduction of 18% of its share price, the biggest drop in its history, putting the club's value at £2.5 billion. On 14 October, Sheikh Jassim withdrew from the bidding process with it being reported that he was growing frustrated with the lack of progress on the Glazers' end. It was also reported that Ratcliffe's bid for 25% of the club was nearing completion and this would be the first step in a gradual full take over.

On 24 December 2023, Ratcliffe's partial acquisition of 25% of Manchester United, including full sporting control, was announced.

On 20 February 2024, Ratcliffe's partial acquisition of the club was confirmed. The sale was completed through Trawlers Ltd., a wholly owned entity of Ratcliffe. The deal saw Ratcliffe pay approximately £1.3 billion for an initial 26.2% stake in the club. Further shares were then issued in return for a £158.5 million capital investment made by Ratcliffe upon completion of the deal, which increased his ownership to 27.7%. Ratcliffe had invested a further £79.2 million by 31 December, 2024, and his ownership is now at 28.9%.

== Co-ownership with INEOS ==
On 9 March 2025, what was described as the first major protest since Ratcliffe's partial take over saw thousands of fans protest against Glazer and Ratcliffe ownership following a ticket price increase to £66 and 450 staff redundancies in aim to curb £131 million in annual losses. The club was still over £1 billion in debt having incurred £37 million in debt interest in the previous year.

== See also ==
- History of Manchester United F.C.
