= The 1958 =

Association of Manchester United supporters

Logo of the organization

The 1958, along with its subgroups Fan Coalition 58 (FC58) and ClaimBackUnited, is an organization made to represent fan interests of the Manchester United Football Club. Founded sometime before mid-2022, the organization has performed a number of largely peaceful fan-led protests against the Glazer ownership of Manchester United, and until reversing the decision in August 2025, against potential acquisition of the club by billionaire Sir Jim Ratcliffe.

== History ==
The organization was founded sometime before mid-2022, and has since organized largely peaceful protests unifying thousands of United fans against the Glazer ownership of Manchester United, and other non-fan ownership attempts including one from billionaire Sir Jim Ratcliffe. After poll results in 2025, however, fans appeared split on whether acquisition by Sir Jim Ratcliffe would be beneficial for the club or not, and likewise, the organization announced protests on this specific matter would be put on pause until the organization could act more united.

Under the main organization, the independent fan representation branch of the organization is run by "Fan Coalition 58" (FC58), and the membership and strategy branch of the organization is "ClaimBackUnited". An additional third branch also focusing in strategy is planned but unlaunched. The FC58 team is led by Chris Haymes.
