= Jean-Louis Dupont =

Belgian lawyer (born 1965)

Jean-Louis Dupont (born 1965) is a Belgian lawyer specialized in sports law and European law who best known for his role in the landmark Bosman ruling by the Court of Justice of the European Union (CJEU).

== Career ==
Born in 1965 in Liège, Belgium, Jean-Louis Dupont was part of the legal team that led the Bosman ruling (CJEU, 15 December 1995), which forced FIFA and UEFA to accept that all players are free at the end of their contract and to end the nationality quota within the European Union (EU), provoking a revolution of the European sport model. He defends various persons and entities in the world of professional sport, especially in lawsuits related to European law that oppose clubs, sportspeople, or unions to international federations. Between 1990 and 1998, he also worked for the European Commission in the establishment and the development of the cooperation between the EU and Cuba. Dupont is working off-counsel at the law firm Roca Junyent (Barcelona-Madrid), and is partner at the boutique law firm Dupont-Hissel. Jean-Louis Dupont is lecturer and co-director of the HELEGS Executive Program in Law, Economics and Geopolitics of Professional Sports..

== Notable clients ==
Among others, Jean-Louis Dupont has represented and defended the interests of the following persons and organisations:

- In 2000, South Africa, in the challenge against FIFA regarding the attribution of the World Cup 2006 to Germany, which ended with the FIFA decision to implement the continental rotation, starting with Africa in 2010.
- David Meca-Medina and Igor Majcen in the matter that led to the Meca-Medina ruling (CJEU, 18 July 2006) which establishes the primacy of European law over all regulations and decisions of the sports federations affecting the economical activity of any person in the sports world.
- The G-14 (the association made up of 18 top European football teams), conducting, among others, the “Charleroi case” which concluded in an agreement between FIFA and UEFA, whereby clubs receive compensation when players are provided for national teams and a co-decision power with regards to the financial and sport format of the UEFA Champions League and the European League.
- Yanina Wickmayer and Xavier Malisse, as well as FC Sion, in some matters that open the debate of clubs and sportspeople having the right to turn to ordinary jurisdiction instead of having the obligation to turn exclusively to the Court of Arbitration for Sport (CAS).
- Numerous clubs and sportspeople, including Real Madrid (and some of their players including Zidane, Raul and Beckham), FC Barcelona, PSG, FC Metz, Juventus, AC Milan, FC Porto, PSV Eindhoven, Liverpool, Olympique de Marseille, Olympique Lyonnais, Galatasaray, Fenerbahce, Standard de Liège, Gica Hagi, Philippe Mexes, Oguchi Onyewu, Sergi Conceicao, Adrian Mutu, Axel Witsel, Marouane Fellaini, Alen Halilovic, José Mourinho, Michel Preud’Homme, Eric Gerets, various professional cycling teams and riders, etc.
- Daniel Striani, player agent, and supporters associations (among which PSG supporters and the "Manchester City FC supporters club") in the complaint against the "break-even rule" as enforced by the UEFA Financial Fair Play regulation.
- Legal Adviser of the Spanish Professional Football League (LPF) and the Portuguese Professional Football League (LPFP) against FIFA in the complaint against Third-Party Ownership (TPO).
- Aspire Academy (Qatar).
- Miami FC and Kingston Stockade FC (versus FIFA, CONCACAF and USSF) in the dispute regarding the implementation of the principle of promotion and relegation in the US and in Canada.
- Adrian Mutu in his appeal to the ECHR, which led this Court to decide, in its Mutu and Pechstein judgment, that CAS was to be considered as "forced arbitration" and that therefore all the fair process guarantees (article 6 ECHR) apply.
- The European Super League, a project launched in 2021 by 12 major European soccer clubs, which led to the CJEU "European Super League" ruling (21 December 2023) that ended with FIFA's and UEFA's monopoly on the organisation of football competitions.
- Lior Refaelov and Royal Antwerp FC against UEFA and the Belgian FA, which led to the CJEU "Royal Antwerp FC" ruling (21 December 2023) that questions the legality of the UEFA and Belgian FA "Home Grown Players" rules.
- Lassana Diarra against FIFA and the Belgian FA, which led to the CJEU "Diarra" ruling (4 October 2024), that declares contrary to EU competition law and free movement of workers the core provisions of the FIFA transfer system.
- RFC Seraing against FIFA and the Belgian FA, which led to the CJEU "RFC Seraing" ruling 1 August 2025), in which the CJEU ruled that arbitration awards issued by the Court of Arbitration for Sport (CAS), resulting from "forced arbitration" imposed by national and international sports federations have no res judica effect and no probatory force in the European Union when European Union public policy is at stake.
- FIFPRO Europe and several of its national members (players' unions) in a case against FIFA and the Belgian FA, pending in the Court of Commerce of Brussels, in which FIFPRO Europe is challenging, under European Union law, the legality of FIFA's "international match calendar" and "Club World Cup", in the broader context of the increasing congestion of the global football calendar.
- Elena Congost, the blind marathon runner who finished third in Paris 2024 but was disqualified by the International Paralympic Committee.
- The foundation "Justice for Players", as an adviser, in the class action against FIFA following the Diarra judgement.
