= Manchester United Supporters' Trust =

British sporting charity

Manchester United Supporters' Trust logo

Manchester United Supporters' Trust (formerly Shareholders United) is the official supporters' trust of Manchester United F.C., as recognised by Supporters Direct. The group, like other supporters' trusts, seeks to strengthen the influence of supporters over the destiny of their clubs through democratic supporter ownership. With a membership of over 200,000, it is the largest supporters' trust in the United Kingdom. MUST's members hope to be able to pool their funds to buy a meaningful stake in the club at a future date if the opportunity arises.

== Origin ==
The ShareholdersUnited Logo

The group was founded in 1998 as 'Shareholders United Against Murdoch', to stop a proposed takeover by Australian-American media tycoon Rupert Murdoch. His bid for control of the club was blocked by the Monopolies and Mergers Commission. The group then changed its name simply to Shareholders United and continued its efforts to encourage supporters to own shares in the then publicly traded club.

== Response to Glazer takeover ==
In 2004, the American businessman Malcolm Glazer made an attempt to buy the club, but was rebuffed by the PLC board because of the large amount of borrowing his bid would rely on. They felt that he would mortgage the club's future to pay for his bid. Shareholders United, together with the Independent Manchester United Supporters Association, organised demonstrations before matches, first before an important league match against Arsenal in an attempt to show the board that supporters were against the takeover, and later before a Champions League match against Milan, when thousands of supporters marched to demonstrate to Glazer that they would not welcome him if he bought the club. They also encouraged members to form flash mobs, where large groups congregated at shops owned by the club's sponsors to temporarily prevent the shops from trading. The purpose of this was an attempt to warn the sponsors that supporters would boycott their products if they continued their links with the club after a takeover.

When the United board refused to recommend Glazer's initial bid, it was seen as a victory for Shareholders United, but on 12 May 2005 Glazer was able to purchase the 28% of shares owned by John Magnier and JP McManus, and, by 23 May 2005 held around 76.16% of the club's shares, enough shares to de-list United from the stock exchange, making the club privately owned. Later in 2005, Glazer was able to claim over 98% of the club's shares, enough to implement a mandatory buyout of all remaining shares, according to UK Law. Shareholders United came under much criticism at the time, because many fans felt that by joining they would guarantee the safety of their shareholding as Shareholders United had enough shares under its control to allow shareholders to keep their stake, but instead they agreed to sell to the Glazers instead of holding out.

== Name change ==
Due to the delisting of Manchester United from the London Stock Exchange, and to reflect its essence as a supporters' trust, Shareholders United changed its name to the Manchester United Supporters' Trust. In 2006 the organisation became an industrial and provident society.

Though it is recognised by Supporters Direct as the official Supporters Trust for Manchester United, the Manchester United Supporters' Trust is wholly independent from Manchester United, and is in no way directly connected with the club or its owners.

== Notable supporters ==
Below is a list of people who are known Manchester United supporters:

Name	Occupation	Reference
Aitch	Rapper	
Usain Bolt	Former sprinter	
Steve Coogan	Actor and comedian	
Eamonn Holmes	Television presenter	
Keely Hodgkinson	Athlete	
Luke Littler	Darts player	
Rory McIlroy	Golfer	
Olly Murs	Singer and television presenter	
Gary Oldman	Actor	
Rachel Riley	Television presenter	
Julia Roberts	Actress	
Stormzy	Rapper	
Harry Styles	Singer and actor	
Justin Timberlake	Singer and actor	
Richard Wilson	Actor and director	
Robert Powell	Actor	
