= 2011–12 Newcastle United F.C. season =

Newcastle United
2011–12 season
- Chairman: Derek Llambias; Chris Mort
- Manager: Alan Pardew
- Stadium: St James' Park
- Premier League: 5th
- FA Cup: Fourth round
- League Cup: Fourth round
- Top goalscorer: League: Demba Ba (16); All: Demba Ba (16)
- Highest home attendance: 52,546 vs. Manchester City; 6 May 2012
- Lowest home attendance: 30,190 vs. Blackburn Rovers; 7 January 2012
- Average home league attendance: 48,983
Home colours	Away colours	Third colours

In the 2011–12 football season, English club Newcastle United competed in the Premier League for the second consecutive season. It was Newcastle United's 119th season of professional football.

In this season, Newcastle finished in fifth place in the Premier League, thus qualifying for the following season's Europa League. After going through their first 11 games unbeaten, Newcastle then failed to win in six consecutive games in November and December, mainly due to a spate of injuries among key defenders. The team recorded a resounding 3–0 home win over champions Manchester United in January and were hammered 5–0 by Tottenham Hotspur in February. The January transfer window saw the arrival of Senegalese striker Papiss Cissé, who quickly became a core part of the team, scoring 13 goals in 14 appearances.

This article shows statistics and lists details of all matches played by the club during the season.

== Chronological list of events ==
- 25 May 2011: Sol Campbell and Shefki Kuqi are released on a free transfer while Lens youngster Mehdi Abeid agrees a deal to be completed on 1 July.
- 27 May 2011: Shane Ferguson is handed a new five-year deal.
- 6 June 2011: New contracts are offered to Michael Richardson and Ryan Donaldson, but Paddy McLaughlin, Daniel Leadbitter, Matthew Grieve and Aaron Spear are released at the end of the season.
- 10 June 2011: Yohan Cabaye is signed from Lille for an undisclosed fee. The fee though is reported to be £4.3 million by several media outlets.
- 16 June 2011: Kevin Nolan's transfer to West Ham United is completed for an undisclosed fee. The fee is believed to be £3 million but could rise to £4 million.

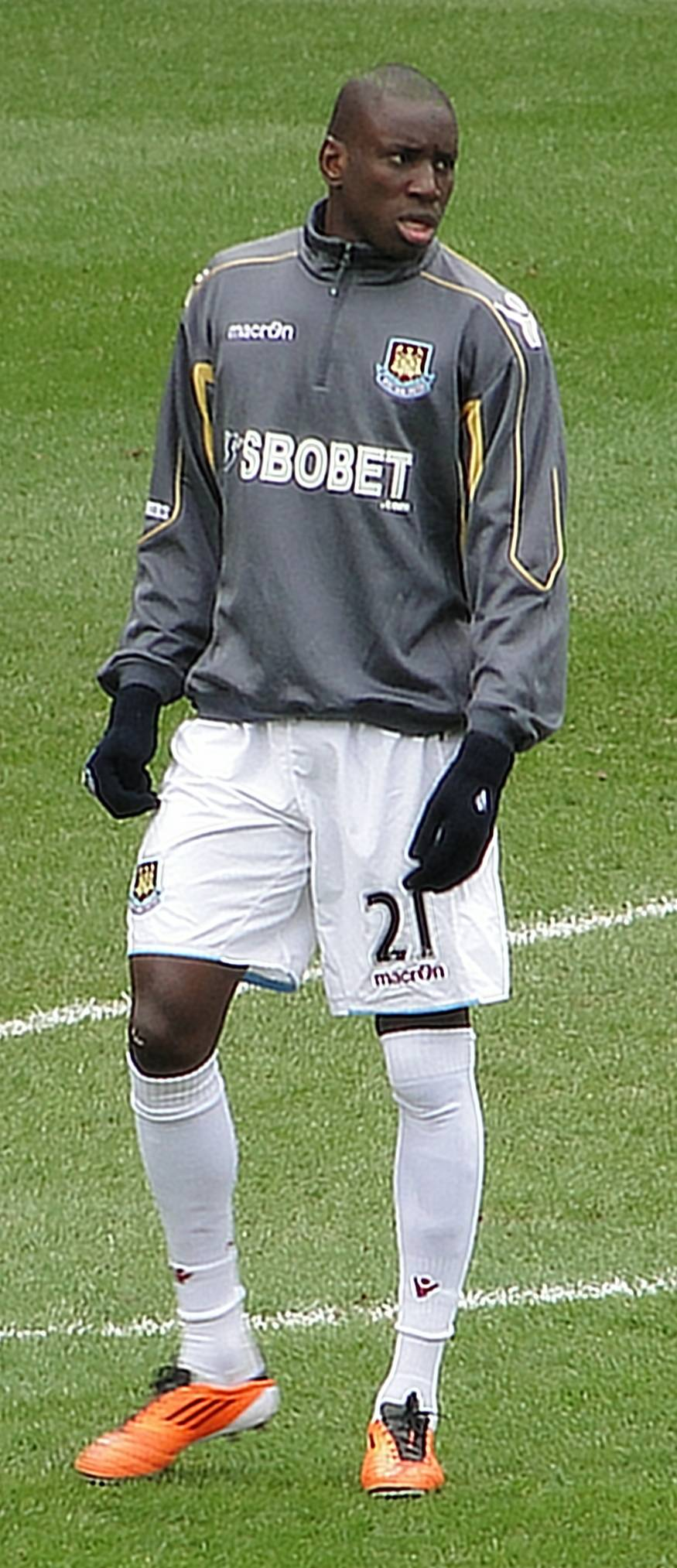
New signing Demba Ba became Newcastle's top scorer for the season

- 17 June 2011: West Ham striker Demba Ba signs for Newcastle on a three-year deal on a free transfer.
- 18 June 2011: Newcastle agree to sign winger Sylvain Marveaux on a five-year deal on 1 July 2011 when his contract with Rennes expires.
- 23 June 2011: Ben Tozer is released and signed by Northampton Town on a two-year deal.
- 1 July 2011: Newcastle sign young French midfielder Mehdi Abeid on a five-year deal after his Lens contract expires.
- 15 July 2011: Newcastle begin pre-season with a 2–0 win away at Darlington. Newcastle's second goal, scored by Sammy Ameobi, caused a pitch invasion which held up the game for ten minutes.
- 16 July 2011: Midfielder Kazenga LuaLua rejoins Brighton & Hove Albion on loan until 15 January 2012.
- 21 July 2011: Newcastle begin their pre-season tour of the United States with a 0–0 draw against Sporting Kansas City.
- 24 July 2011: The Magpies' second match in the U.S. ends in a 1–0 loss to Orlando City in Orlando, Florida.
- 27 July 2011: Alan Pardew's team finish their tour of the U.S. with a 3–0 win over the Columbus Crew with goals from Shola Ameobi, Fabricio Coloccini and Haris Vučkić.
- 31 July 2011: Newcastle's first match back in England sees them lose 3–2 to Championship outfit Leeds United at Elland Road, despite goals from Steven Taylor and Haris Vukčić.
- 2 August 2011: Newcastle announce that their midfielder Joey Barton has been transfer listed and will be allowed to leave the club on a free transfer.
- 4 August 2011: Wayne Routledge completes move to Swansea City.
- 5 August 2011: Midfielder Michael Richardson joins Leyton Orient on an initial one-month loan deal.
- 6 August 2011: The Magpies's only friendly at St James' Park, against Italian giants Fiorentina, is abandoned after 63 minutes due to players slipping over the pitch because of heavy rain.
- 9 August 2011: Newcastle complete the signing of Manchester United midfielder Gabriel Obertan on a five-year deal.
- 11 August 2011: Defender James Tavernier joins Carlisle United on an initial one-month loan deal and striker Phil Airey joins Hibernian on a six-month loan deal.
- 11 August 2011: Striker Xisco rejoins former club Deportivo de La Coruña on loan until the end of the season.
- 12 August 2011: Jose Enrique is signed by Liverpool for a reported £6 million.
- 13 August 2011: The Magpies Start the 2011–12 Premier League season with an impressive 0–0 draw at home to Arsenal, who dominate chances forcing stand-in goalkeeper Tim Krul to make plenty of saves.
- 17 August 2011: Goalkeeper Fraser Forster re-joins Celtic on a season-long loan.
- 20 August 2011: A free-kick goal from Ryan Taylor gives Newcastle a 1–0 win at local rivals Sunderland, who have Phil Bardsley sent off late on. The win sends Alan Pardew's team top of the Premier League for 45 minutes until Liverpool's shock 2–0 win at Arsenal.
- 25 August 2011: In the second round of League Cup, Newcastle come from behind to beat League One side Scunthorpe United 2–1 at Glanford Park with another excellent free-kick from Ryan Taylor as well as Sammy Ameobi's first goal for the club, coming in extra-time.
- 26 August 2011: Joey Barton completes a move to Queens Park Rangers on a free transfer.
- 28 August 2011: A brace From Leon Best, including a Goal of The Month contender, gives the Tynesiders a 2–1 win over Fulham.
- 30 August 2011: Left-back Davide Santon is signed from Inter Milan for an expected fee of £5 million.

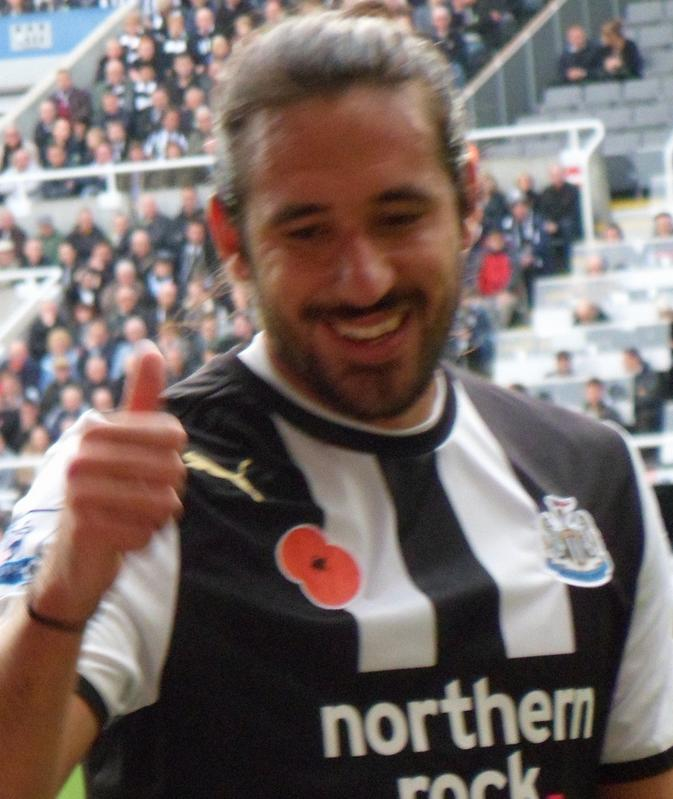
Newcastle midfielder Jonás Gutiérrez

- 30 August 2011: Goalkeeper Rob Elliot is signed from Charlton Athletic on a five-year deal for an undisclosed fee.
- 12 September 2011: Joey Barton makes his QPR debut against former club Newcastle in a goalless draw at Loftus Road.
- 16 September 2011: Midfielder/striker Ryan Donaldson joins Tranmere Rovers on a one-month loan.
- 17 September 2011: Former Newcastle goalkeeper Shay Given makes a number saves for Aston Villa in a 1–1 draw with Newcastle at Villa Park.
- 20 September 2011: A dramatic League Cup third-round tie at Championship strugglers Nottingham Forest sees the Magpies win 4–3 after extra-time.
- 24 September 2011: Demba Ba scores his first three Newcastle goals in a 3–1 win over Blackburn Rovers just three hours after the two teams were drawn together for the fourth round of the League Cup.
- 30 September 2011: Goalkeeper Ole Söderberg joins Darlington on a one-month loan.
- 1 October 2011: After a Demba Ba header puts Newcastle in front against Wolverhampton Wanderers at Molineux Stadium, Jonás Gutiérrez scores another solo goal in 2–1 win over the West Midlanders who had a goal disallowed in stoppage time denying them a point.
- 16 October 2011: After Rafael van der Vaart penalty, followed by a Demba Ba equaliser, two excellent strikes from Jermain Defoe and Shola Ameobi mean Newcastle's match with Tottenham Hotpspur at St James' Park finishes 2–2.
- 22 October 2011: Yohan Cabaye's first goal for the club gives Newcastle a narrow 1–0 win over struggling Wigan Athletic and keep the club's unbeaten to 14 games in all competitions, going back to early May.
- 24 October 2011: Goalkeeper Steve Harper joins Brighton & Hove Albion on a one-month loan.
- 26 October 2011: Newcastle's unbeaten run ends in the fourth round of the League Cup against Blackburn. There are three controversial penalty decisions in the match (two for Blackburn, one for Newcastle), with each penalty scored, but Blackburn's Gaël Givet nonetheless scores an extra-time winner, despite offside calls from the Magpies.
- 31 October 2011: Exactly a year after thrashing local rivals Sunderland 5–1, with Kevin Nolan scoring a hat-trick, Demba Ba scores all three Newcastle goals in a 3–1 win at Stoke City, giving Tony Pulis's side their first home defeat of the season.
- 5 November 2011: A John Heitinga own goal and a screamer from Ryan Taylor give Newcastle a 2–1 win over Everton, putting the Magpies second in the Premier League until Manchester United's 1–0 home win over Sunderland.
- 19 November 2011: Newcastle's unbeaten run comes to an end with a 3–1 defeat at league leaders and eventual champions Manchester City; Dan Gosling's first Newcastle goal in the 89th minute is only a consolation for the Magpies.
- 21 November 2011: Kazenga LuaLua joins Brighton on a permanent deal for an undisclosed fee while James Tavernier joins Sheffield Wednesday and Nile Ranger joins Barnsley on loan deals until January.
- 26 November 2011: After a goalless first-half against defending champions Manchester United at Old Trafford, a goal from Javier Hernández and a Demba Ba penalty before Jonás Gutiérrez's red card Tim Krul makes a lot of saves in stoppage time although the home side's goalscorer has another goal disallowed.
- 27 November 2011: The death of Newcastle legend Gary Speed shocks the football world; BBC News reported that the Wales national team manager had committed suicide.
- 3 December 2011: Newcastle suffer their first home defeat of the season as Chelsea put in a superb performance in a 3–0 win, although Tim Krul saved a Frank Lampard penalty. Blues defender David Luiz was lucky not to be sent off for an early foul on Demba Ba
- 4 December 2011: Newcastle are drawn at home to Blackburn for the Third Round of the FA Cup.
- 10 December 2011: Despite another two goals from Demba Ba, Newcastle crash to a 4–2 defeat at Norwich City. This is the first time since March they have suffered two successive Premier League losses, meaning Alan Pardew's team go down to seventh in the Premier League.
- 17 December 2011: Excellent saves from Dutch goalkeepers Tim Krul and Michel Vorm mean Newcastle are held to a goalless draw at home to Swansea; Ba goes closest with a scissor kick which hit the post.
- 21 December 2011: Newcastle's longest winless run of the season extends to six games with a shock 3–2 loss to West Bromwhich Albion, who extend their unbeaten away run to three games.
- 26 December 2011: The Magpies end their winless run and claim their first Boxing Day win since 2001 by beating 19th-placed Bolton Wanderers 2–0 with two excellent goals in two minutes from Hatem Ben Arfa and Demba Ba.
- 30 December 2011: Despite taking the lead at Anfield through an own goal by Daniel Agger, although Liverpool come back to win 3–1 via a brace from former Newcastle favourite Craig Bellamy and a fantastic goal from captain Steven Gerrard.
- 4 January 2012: Virgin Money replaced Northern Rock as sponsor under Northern Rock's current deal; Virgin signed a new two-year deal to be the shirt sponsor for the club. In their first Virgin-sponsored game Newcastle beat Manchester United 3–0.
- 7 January 2012: After falling behind at home to Blackburn in the FA Cup, two excellent goals from Hatem Ben Arfa – who would win ESPN's Player of the Round – and Jonás Gutiérrez in stoppage time win the game 2–1 for Newcastle.
- 8 January 2012: In the first FA Cup fourth-round tie to be drawn, the Magpies are given a trip to shock Championship promotion challengers Brighton.
- 15 January 2012: Leon Best scores his first goal since September in a 1–0 win over QPR, taking the Magpies back up to sixth.
- 17 January 2012: Papiss Cissé signs for Newcastle United on a 5 1/2-year deal for around £8 million.
- 21 January 2012: After Danny Guthrie's first half screamer (his first of the season), a nightmare second-half, including a Clint Dempsey hat-trick and a Mike Williamson red card, mean Newcastle suffer a 5–2 loss to Fulham at Craven Cottage.
- 28 January 2012: Just a week after his red card at Fulham (suspensions only for Premier League matches), Mike Williamson scores an own goal as Newcastle suffer a shock FA Cup fourth round loss at Brighton, the second year the centre-back has netted an own goal in a Newcastle FA Cup loss to lower league opposition.
- 29 January 2012: Midfielder Alan Smith joins Milton Keynes Dons on loan until the end of the season.
- 31 January 2012: Defender James Tavernier joins Milton Keynes Dons on loan until the end of the season.
- 1 February 2012: In Newcastle's last match without Demba Ba, Papiss Cissé and Cheik Tioté, they beat Blackburn 2–0, the second time in three and a half weeks and the third time this season they have beaten Steve Kean's side (in all competitions). Goals came from a Scott Dann own goal and Gabriel Obertan's first Premier League goal. Goalkeeper Tim Krul also saved a David Dunn penalty.
- 5 February 2012: Demba Ba scores on his return to the Premier League against Aston Villa. After a Robbie Keane equaliser, Papiss Cissé scores a half-volley on his debut resulting in a 2–1 win that moves the Tynesiders up to fifth.
- 11 February 2012: After being touted as major UEFA Champions League contenders, Newcastle traveled to White Hart Lane and incurred an in-form Spurs side who ripped the normally solid Newcastle formation apart to hammer them 5–0 (4–0 at half time), the Magpies' biggest defeat of the season.
- 25 February 2012: Newcastle lose a 2–0 lead at home to Wolves and are held to a 2–2 draw; Chelsea take advantage and beat Bolton 3–0.
- 4 March 2012: In a tense Tyne-Wear Derby against Sunderland, Newcastle go a goal down after Nicklas Bendtner converts a penalty. Demba Ba misses a penalty, but Shola Ameobi's late equaliser earns the Magpies a point in the 1–1 draw.
- 12 March 2012: After Hatem Ben Arfa gives Newcastle the lead against Arsenal, the Gunners become the first club to win four consecutive Premier League matches from behind, having already done it against Sunderland, Tottenham and Liverpool; their goals against Newcastle were from Robin van Persie and Thomas Vermaelen.
- 18 March 2012: Papiss Cissé scores the only goal of Newcastle's 1–0 win over Norwich, helping them close the gap on Chelsea and ending a four-game winless run and starting a run of six consecutive wins.
- 22 March 2012: Nile Ranger joins Sheffield Wednesday on loan until the end of the season.
- 25 March 2012: A fantastic first-half performance against West Brom sees an excellent goal each for Hatem Ben Arfa and Papiss Cissé and a tap-in for the Senegalese striker mean the Magpies are 3–0 up at half-time. A Shane Long consolation for West Brom mean Pardew's side win 3–1.
- 1 April 2012: Two excellent goals from Papiss Cissé help Newcastle to a 2–0 win over Liverpool, who have goalkeeper Pepe Reina sent off, forcing former Newcastle defender José Enrique to play goal.
- 4 April 2012: James Tavernier is recalled early from his loan spell with MK Dons.
- 6 April 2012: Two more goals from Papiss Cissé, including a sublime chip, help Newcastle to a 2–0 win at Swansea, taking the Magpies up to fifth before Chelsea's controversial win over Wigan the following day.
- 9 April 2012: A solo goal from Ben Arfa and a Cissé goal give Newcastle a 2–0 win over struggling Bolton, taking the Magpies back up to fifth.
- 14 April 2012: Liverpool reach the FA Cup final at the expense of Everton. The result guarantees Newcastle UEFA Europa League football for the 2012–13 season if they finish between fifth and seventh.
- 21 April 2012: Newcastle's 3–0 victory against Stoke guarantees them finishing sixth place or higher in the Premier League, meaning they are certain to at least play in the Europa League during the 2012–13 season.
- 28 April 2012: Newcastle travel to Wigan after six consecutive wins, but lose 4–0, with all goals scored in the first-half.
- 2 May 2012: Newcastle record their first league win against Chelsea at Stamford Bridge since 1986, 2–0. Both goals are scored by Cissé, including the goal which would win the Goal of the Season award in stoppage time.
- 6 May 2012: Two excellent second-half goals from Yaya Touré mean Pardew's team slip to a 2–0 loss at home to eventual champions Manchester City in front of 52,389 spectators, the biggest ever Premier League attendance at St James' Park.
- 8 May 2012: Liverpool's shock 4–1 win over Chelsea means Newcastle are guaranteed to finish above both teams in the Premier League.
- 11 May 2012: Alan Pardew wins Premier League Manager of the Season and the League Managers Association of the Year.
- 13 May 2012: Newcastle miss out on a Champions League place after a 3–1 loss at Everton on the final day of the season, as well as Arsenal's 3–2 win at West Brom and Tottenham's 2–0 win over Fulham. Spurs, however, miss out on a Champions League spot after sixth-placed Chelsea win the Champions League six days later, guaranteeing them a spot in the 2012–13 Champions League as defending champions which comes at the expense of Spurs, who instead go into the Europa League.

== Club ==
=== Team kit ===
Puma will be supplying the team kits for a final season, unless they extend their current contract. Puma will be designing three new kits for Newcastle. The initial kit sponsor was Northern Rock, who entered their ninth year of sponsoring the team. In 2011, a clause was triggered to end Northern Rock's deal early at the end of this season. On 1 January 2012, Virgin Money bought Northern Rock and on 4 January, Virgin replaced Northern Rock as sponsor, as well as signing a new two-year deal to sponsor the shirt.

=== Coaching staff ===
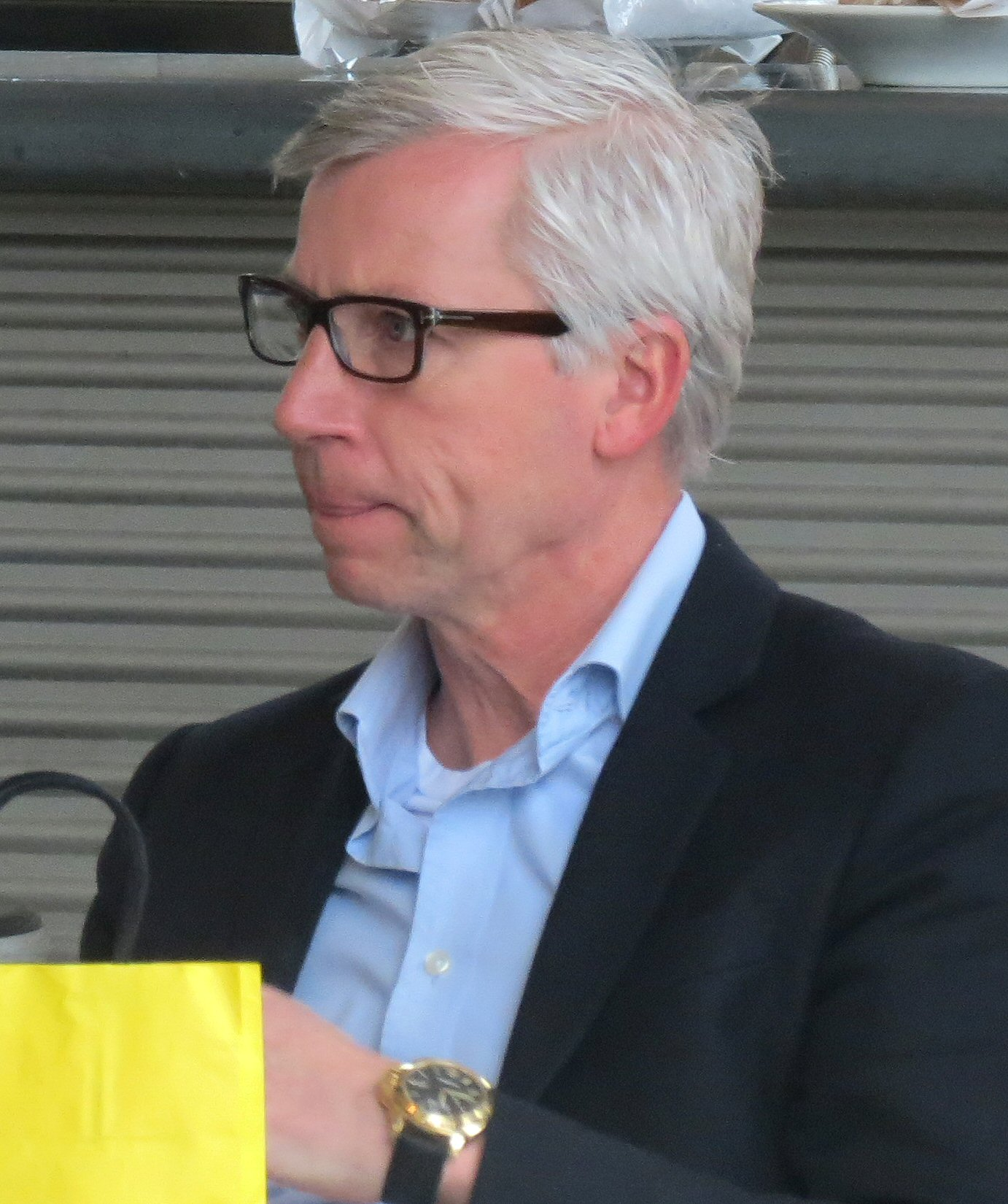
Alan Pardew in February 2012

Position	Staff
Manager	(England) Alan Pardew
Assistant Manager	(England) John Carver
First Team coach	(England) Steve Stone
Goalkeeping Coach	(England) Andy Woodman
Development Coach	(Scotland) Willie Donachie
Reserve Team Coach	(England) Peter Beardsley
Chief scout	(England) Graham Carr

Last updated: 3 May 2011

== Players ==
=== First-team ===
Squad at end of season

Note: Flags indicate national team as defined under FIFA eligibility rules; some limited exceptions apply. Players may hold more than one non-FIFA nationality.

No.	Pos.	Nation	Player
1	GK	ENG	Steve Harper
2	DF	ARG	Fabricio Coloccini
3	DF	ITA	Davide Santon
4	MF	FRA	Yohan Cabaye
5	DF	ENG	Danny Simpson
6	DF	ENG	Mike Williamson
8	MF	ENG	Danny Guthrie
9	FW	SEN	Papiss Cissé
10	MF	FRA	Hatem Ben Arfa
11	FW	DEN	Peter Løvenkrands
13	MF	ALG	Mehdi Abeid
14	DF	ENG	James Perch
15	MF	ENG	Dan Gosling
16	DF	ENG	Ryan Taylor
18	MF	ARG	Jonás Gutiérrez

No.	Pos.	Nation	Player
19	FW	SEN	Demba Ba
20	FW	IRL	Leon Best
22	MF	FRA	Sylvain Marveaux
23	FW	NGR	Shola Ameobi
24	MF	CIV	Cheick Tioté
25	MF	FRA	Gabriel Obertan
26	GK	NED	Tim Krul
27	DF	ENG	Steven Taylor
28	MF	ENG	Sammy Ameobi
29	MF	SLO	Haris Vučkić
30	FW	ENG	Nile Ranger
31	MF	NIR	Shane Ferguson
32	FW	ENG	Ryan Donaldson
34	DF	ENG	James Tavernier
35	GK	IRL	Rob Elliot

=== Left club during season ===
Note: Flags indicate national team as defined under FIFA eligibility rules; some limited exceptions apply. Players may hold more than one non-FIFA nationality.

No.	Pos.	Nation	Player
7	MF	ENG	Joey Barton (to Queens Park Rangers)
17	MF	ENG	Alan Smith (on loan to MK Dons)

No.	Pos.	Nation	Player
21	GK	ENG	Fraser Forster (on loan to Celtic)
33	GK	SWE	Ole Söderberg (to Molde)

=== Reserves ===
The following players did not appear for the first team this season.

Note: Flags indicate national team as defined under FIFA eligibility rules; some limited exceptions apply. Players may hold more than one non-FIFA nationality.

No.	Pos.	Nation	Player
36	MF	ENG	Greg McDermott
37	DF	WAL	Paul Dummett
38	DF	ENG	Jeff Henderson
40	MF	ENG	Michael Richardson
45	DF	HUN	Tamás Kádár
—	GK	ENG	Jak Alnwick
—	DF	IRL	Stephen Folan
—	DF	TAN	Patrick Nzuzi

No.	Pos.	Nation	Player
—	MF	ENG	Conor Newton
—	MF	SCO	Bradden Inman
—	MF	CGO	Yven Moyo
—	FW	ENG	Phil Airey
—	FW	ENG	JJ Hooper
—	FW	ENG	Ryan McGorrigan
—	FW	FRO	Jóan Símun Edmundsson

=== Youth team ===
Note: Flags indicate national team as defined under FIFA eligibility rules; some limited exceptions apply. Players may hold more than one non-FIFA nationality.

No.	Pos.	Nation	Player
—	GK	AUS	Alex Baird
—	DF	ENG	Michael Hoganson
—	DF	ENG	Michael Riley
—	DF	ENG	Louis Storey
—	DF	ENG	Remie Streete
—	DF	WAL	Alex Nicholson
—	DF	NIR	Lee Toland
—	MF	ENG	Marcus Maddison

No.	Pos.	Nation	Player
—	MF	ENG	Ben Sayer
—	MF	IRL	Brandon Miele
—	FW	ENG	Dennis Knight
—	FW	ENG	Billy Ions
—	FW	ENG	Dan Taylor
—	FW	SWE	Samuel Adjei
—			Jamie Smith

=== Trialists ===
The following players came to Newcastle as trialists this season.

Note: Flags indicate national team as defined under FIFA eligibility rules; some limited exceptions apply. Players may hold more than one non-FIFA nationality.

No. / Pos. / Nation / Player; — / DF / SUI / Valentin Gjokaj (on trial from FC Luzern)	No. / Pos. / Nation / Player; — / DF / MTQ / Christophe Lowinsky (on trial from Marseille)

== Statistics ==
=== Appearances and goals ===
Last updated on 14 May 2012.

No.	Pos	Nat	Player	Total		Premier League		FA Cup		League Cup	
No.	Pos	Nat	Player	Apps	Goals	Apps	Goals	Apps	Goals	Apps	Goals
2	DF	(Argentina) ARG	Fabricio Coloccini	39	1	35	0	1	0	3	1
3	DF	(Italy) ITA	Davide Santon	27	0	19+5	0	2	0	1	0
4	MF	(France) FRA	Yohan Cabaye	38	5	34	4	2	0	2	1
5	DF	(England) ENG	Danny Simpson	40	1	35	0	2	0	3	1
6	DF	(England) ENG	Mike Williamson	25	0	21+1	0	2	0	1	0
8	MF	(England) ENG	Danny Guthrie	19	2	13+3	1	1	0	2	1
9	FW	(Senegal) SEN	Papiss Cissé	14	13	13+1	13	0	0	0	0
10	MF	(France) FRA	Hatem Ben Arfa	30	6	16+10	5	2	1	2	0
11	FW	(Denmark) DEN	Peter Løvenkrands	12	3	2+7	0	0	0	2+1	3
13	MF	(Algeria) ALG	Mehdi Abeid	2	0	0	0	1	0	1	0
14	DF	(England) ENG	James Perch	28	0	13+12	0	1	0	2	0
15	MF	(England) ENG	Dan Gosling	16	1	1+11	1	0+2	0	2	0
16	DF	(England) ENG	Ryan Taylor	34	3	23+8	2	0+2	0	1	1
17	MF	(England) ENG	Alan Smith	2	0	0+2	0	0	0	0	0
18	MF	(Argentina) ARG	Jonás Gutiérrez	40	3	37	2	2	1	1	0
19	FW	(Senegal) SEN	Demba Ba	36	16	32+2	16	0	0	2	0
20	FW	(Republic of Ireland) IRL	Leon Best	21	4	16+2	4	2	0	1	0
22	MF	(France) FRA	Sylvain Marveaux	10	0	1+6	0	0	0	3	0
23	FW	(Nigeria) NGR	Shola Ameobi	30	2	8+19	2	1+1	0	0+1	0
24	MF	(Ivory Coast) CIV	Cheick Tioté	24	0	24	0	0	0	0	0
25	MF	(France) FRA	Gabriel Obertan	26	1	18+5	1	1	0	0+2	0
26	GK	(Netherlands) NED	Tim Krul	42	0	38	0	2	0	2	0
27	DF	(England) ENG	Steven Taylor	15	0	14	0	0	0	0+1	0
28	FW	(England) ENG	Sammy Ameobi	13	1	1+9	0	0	0	0+3	1
29	MF	(Slovenia) SLO	Haris Vučkić	5	0	2+2	0	0	0	0+1	0
31	MF	(Northern Ireland) NIR	Shane Ferguson	9	0	0+7	0	0+1	0	1	0
35	GK	(Republic of Ireland) IRL	Rob Elliot	1	0	0	0	0	0	1	0
Players no longer at the club:
7	MF	(England) ENG	Joey Barton	2	0	2	0	0	0	0	0

=== Top scorers ===
Place	Position	Nation	Number	Name	Premier League	FA Cup	League Cup	Total
1	FW	(Senegal)	19	Demba Ba	16	0	0	16
2	FW	(Senegal)	9	Papiss Cissé	13	0	0	13
3	MF	(France)	10	Hatem Ben Arfa	5	1	0	6
4	MF	(France)	4	Yohan Cabaye	4	0	1	5
5	FW	(Republic of Ireland)	20	Leon Best	4	0	0	4
6	MF	(Argentina)	18	Jonás Gutiérrez	2	1	0	3
6	FW	(Denmark)	11	Peter Løvenkrands	0	0	3	3
6	DF	(England)	16	Ryan Taylor	2	0	1	3
9	FW	(Nigeria)	23	Shola Ameobi	2	0	0	2
9	MF	(England)	8	Danny Guthrie	1	0	1	2
11	FW	(England)	28	Sammy Ameobi	0	0	1	1
11	DF	(Argentina)	2	Fabricio Coloccini	0	0	1	1
11	MF	(England)	15	Dan Gosling	1	0	0	1
11	MF	(France)	25	Gabriel Obertan	1	0	0	1
11	DF	(England)	5	Danny Simpson	0	0	1	1
	-	-	-	Own goal	4	0	0	4
				TOTALS	55	2	9	66

=== Cards ===
Accounts for all competitions. Last updated on 6 May 2012.

No.	Pos.	Name	Yellow card	Red card
1	GK	(England) Steve Harper	0	0
2	DF	(Argentina) Fabricio Coloccini	4	0
3	DF	(Italy) Davide Santon	1	0
4	MF	(France) Yohan Cabaye	7	0
5	DF	(England) Danny Simpson	8	0
6	DF	(England) Mike Williamson	5	0
7	MF	(England) Joey Barton	2	0
8	MF	(England) Danny Guthrie	4	0
9	FW	(Senegal) Papiss Cissé	1	0
10	MF	(France) Hatem Ben Arfa	2	0
11	FW	(Denmark) Peter Løvenkrands	0	0
13	MF	(Algeria) Mehdi Abeid	1	0
14	DF	(England) James Perch	3	0
15	MF	(England) Dan Gosling	2	1
16	DF	(England) Ryan Taylor	5	0
17	MF	(England) Alan Smith	1	0
18	MF	(Argentina) Jonás Gutiérrez	6	1
19	FW	(Senegal) Demba Ba	1	0
20	FW	(Republic of Ireland) Leon Best	2	0
21	GK	(England) Fraser Forster	0	0
22	MF	(France) Sylvain Marveaux	0	0
23	FW	(Nigeria) Shola Ameobi	3	0
24	MF	(Ivory Coast) Cheick Tioté	10	0
25	MF	(France) Gabriel Obertan	0	0
26	GK	(Netherlands) Tim Krul	5	0
27	DF	(England) Steven Taylor	2	0
28	FW	(England) Sammy Ameobi	1	0
29	MF	(Slovenia) Haris Vučkić	0	0
30	FW	(England) Nile Ranger	0	0
31	MF	(Northern Ireland) Shane Ferguson	2	0
32	MF	(England) Ryan Donaldson	0	0
33	GK	(Sweden) Ole Söderberg	0	0
34	DF	(England) James Tavernier	0	0
35	GK	(Republic of Ireland) Rob Elliot	0	0
36	MF	(England) Greg McDermott	0	0
37	DF	(Wales) Paul Dummett	0	0
38	DF	(England) Jeff Henderson	0	0
40	DF	(Hungary) Tamás Kádár	0	0

=== Starting formations ===
Accounts for all competitions. Last updated on 6 May 2012.

Formation	League	FA Cup	League Cup	Total
4–4–2	18	0	1	19
4–4–1–1	1	1	1	3
4–2–3–1	12	1	1	14
4–3–3	7	0	0	7

=== Captains ===
Accounts for all competitions. Last updated on 6 May 2012.

No.	Pos.	Name	Starts
2	DF	(Argentina) Fabricio Coloccini	38
18	MF	(Argentina) Jonás Gutiérrez	3
23	FW	(Nigeria) Shola Ameobi	1

== Transfers ==
=== In ===
Date	Pos.	Name	From	Fee	Source
25 May 2011	MF	(Algeria) Mehdi Abeid	(France) Lens	Free	
10 June 2011	MF	(France) Yohan Cabaye	(France) Lille	£4,300,000	
17 June 2011	FW	(Senegal) Demba Ba	(England) West Ham United	Free	
18 June 2011	MF	(France) Sylvain Marveaux	(France) Rennes	Free	
9 August 2011	MF	(France) Gabriel Obertan	(England) Manchester United	£3,250,000	
30 August 2011	DF	(Italy) Davide Santon	(Italy) Inter Milan	£5,000,000	
30 August 2011	GK	(Republic of Ireland) Rob Elliot	(England) Charlton Athletic	£300,000	
17 January 2012	FW	(Senegal) Papiss Cissé	(Germany) SC Freiburg	£9,000,000	

- Total spending: ▼ ~ £23,850,000

=== Out ===
Date	Pos.	Name	To	Fee	Source
25 May 2011	DF	(England) Sol Campbell	Free agent	Free	
25 May 2011	FW	(Finland) Shefki Kuqi	(England) Oldham Athletic	Free	
16 June 2011	MF	(England) Kevin Nolan	(England) West Ham United	£4,000,000	
23 June 2011	MF	(England) Ben Tozer	(England) Northampton Town	Free	
30 June 2011	MF	(Northern Ireland) Paddy McLaughlin	(England) York City	Free	
30 June 2011	DF	(England) Matthew Grieve	(England) Ashington	Free	
30 June 2011	MF	(England) Daniel Leadbitter	(England) Torquay United	Free	
30 June 2011	FW	(Democratic Republic of the Congo) Andy Mogwo	(England) West Auckland Town	Free	
30 June 2011	MF	(England) Ryan Page	(England) North Shields	Free	
30 June 2011	GK	(England) Ben Robinson	(England) Trafford	Free	
30 June 2011	FW	(England) Aaron Spear	(Iceland) ÍBV	Free	
4 August 2011	MF	(England) Wayne Routledge	(Wales) Swansea City	£2,000,000	
12 August 2011	DF	(Spain) José Enrique	(England) Liverpool	£6,000,000	
26 August 2011	MF	(England) Joey Barton	(England) Queens Park Rangers	Free	
16 September 2011	MF	(Italy) Fabio Zamblera	Free agent	Free	
21 November 2011	MF	(Democratic Republic of the Congo) Kazenga LuaLua	(England) Brighton & Hove Albion	£1,000,000	
15 February 2012	MF	(Faroe Islands) Jóan Símun Edmundsson	(Norway) Viking	Free	
1 April 2012	GK	(Sweden) Ole Söderberg	(Norway) Molde	Free	

- Total income: ▲ ~ £13,000,000

=== Loans in ===
Date	Pos.	Name	From	Expiry	Source

=== Loans out ===
Date	Pos.	Name	To	Until	Source
2011-07-16	MF	(Democratic Republic of the Congo) Kazenga LuaLua	(England) Brighton & Hove Albion	2012-01-15	
2011-08-05	MF	(England) Michael Richardson	(England) Leyton Orient	2011-09-05	
2011-08-11	DF	(England) James Tavernier	(England) Carlisle United	2011-11-05	
2011-08-11	ST	(England) Phil Airey	(Scotland) Hibernian	2011-09-26	
2011-08-11	MF	(Spain) Xisco	(Spain) Deportivo La Coruña	2012-05-31	
2011-08-17	GK	(England) Fraser Forster	(Scotland) Celtic	2012-05-31	
2011-09-08	GK	(England) Jak Alnwick	(England) Gateshead	2012-01-01	
2011-09-16	MF	(England) Ryan Donaldson	(England) Tranmere Rovers	2011-10-16	
2011-09-30	GK	(Sweden) Ole Söderberg	(England) Darlington	2011-10-30	
2011-10-06	DF	(England) Jeff Henderson	(England) Gateshead	2011-12-07	
2011-10-24	GK	(England) Steve Harper	(England) Brighton & Hove Albion	2011-11-24	
2011-11-03	GK	(Sweden) Ole Söderberg	(England) Chesterfield	2011-12-10	
2011-11-21	DF	(England) James Tavernier	(England) Sheffield Wednesday	2012-01-09	
2011-11-21	FW	(England) Nile Ranger	(England) Barnsley	2012-01-14	
2011-12-21	FW	(England) Dan Taylor	(England) Ashington	2012-02-01	
2012-01-20	FW	(England) Phil Airey	(England) Gateshead	2012-02-07	
2012-01-29	MF	(England) Alan Smith	(England) Milton Keynes Dons	2012-05-31	
2012-01-31	DF	(England) James Tavernier	(England) Milton Keynes Dons	2012-04-04	
2012-02-10	MF	(Slovenia) Haris Vučkić	(Wales) Cardiff City	2012-03-10	
2012-03-02	FW	(Sweden) Samuel Adjei	(England) Hartlepool United	2012-03-31	
2012-03-05	DF	(Wales) Paul Dummett	(England) Gateshead	2012-05-31	
2012-03-22	FW	(England) Nile Ranger	(England) Sheffield Wednesday	2012-05-31	

== Competitions ==
Win Draw Loss Void

=== Pre-season ===
15 July 2011	Darlington	0–2	Newcastle United	Darlington
19:45 BST		Report	Barton 3'; Sa. Ameobi 55'	Stadium: The Darlington Arena; Attendance: 9,731; Referee: Colin Webster

20 July 2011	Sporting Kansas City	0–0	Newcastle United	Kansas City, Kansas, United States
19:30 CDT		Report		Stadium: Livestrong Sporting Park; Attendance: 16,131; Referee: Edvin Jurisevic

23 July 2011	Orlando City	1–0	Newcastle United	Orlando, Florida, United States
19:30 EDT	Molino 75'	Report		Stadium: Citrus Bowl; Attendance: 10,889; Referee: Carlos Sandoval

26 July 2011	Columbus Crew	0–3	Newcastle United	Columbus, Ohio, United States
19:30 EDT	Gruenebaum (red card) 44'	Report	Sh. Ameobi 8'; Coloccini 51'; Vučkić 90'	Stadium: Columbus Crew Stadium; Attendance: 11,224; Referee: Michael Kennedy

31 July 2011	Leeds United	3–2	Newcastle United	Leeds
14:00 BST	Kisnorbo 5'; Sam 67'; Paynter 85'	Report	S. Taylor 35'; Vučkić 77'	Stadium: Elland Road; Attendance: 20,457; Referee: Andy Haines

6 August 2011	Newcastle United	A–A (Score: 0–0 63rd minute due to waterlogged pitch.)	Fiorentina	Newcastle Upon Tyne
15:00 BST		Report		Stadium: St James' Park; Attendance: 12,656; Referee: Mark Halsey

=== Premier League ===
==== League table ====
Pos	Team	Pld	W	D	L	GF	GA	GD	Pts	Qualification or relegation
3	Arsenal	38	21	7	10	74	49	+25	70	Qualification for the Champions League group stage
4	Tottenham Hotspur	38	20	9	9	66	41	+25	69	Qualification for the Europa League group stage (Note: Chelsea won the Champions League and thus qualified for the group stage as defending champions, forfeiting their spot in the Europa League as the FA Cup winners. This meant that Tottenham were to compete in the Europa League group stage, since, pursuant to the rules, only four clubs from the Premier League could play in the Champions League.)
5	Newcastle United	38	19	8	11	56	51	+5	65	Qualification for the Europa League play-off round
6	Chelsea	38	18	10	10	65	46	+19	64	Qualification for the Champions League group stage
7	Everton	38	15	11	12	50	40	+10	56	

Source: Barclays Premier League
Rules for classification: 1) points; 2) goal difference; 3) number of goals scored.

==== Results summary ====
Round	1	2	3	4	5	6	7	8	9	10	11	12	13	14	15	16	17	18	19	20	21	22	23	24	25	26	27	28	29	30	31	32	33	34	35	36	37	38
Ground	H	A	H	A	A	H	A	H	H	A	H	A	A	H	A	H	H	A	A	H	H	A	A	H	A	H	H	A	H	A	H	A	H	H	A	A	H	A
Result	D	W	W	D	D	W	W	D	W	W	W	L	D	L	L	D	L	W	L	W	W	L	W	W	L	D	D	L	W	W	W	W	W	W	L	W	L	L
Position	10	7	6	4	4	4	4	4	4	3	3	4	4	6	7	7	7	7	7	7	6	6	5	5	6	6	6	6	6	6	6	5	5	4	4	5	5	5

Source: Fixtures and Results
A = Away; H = Home; W = Win; D = Draw; L = Loss

==== Matches ====
13 August 2011 1	Newcastle United	0–0	Arsenal	Newcastle upon Tyne
17:30 BST		Report	Gervinho (red card) 76'	Stadium: St James' Park; Attendance: 46,894 (3,352 Arsenal); Referee: Peter Walton

20 August 2011 2	Sunderland	0–1	Newcastle United	Sunderland
12:00 BST	Bardsley (yellow card) 68' (yellow-red card) 89'	Report	R. Taylor 62'	Stadium: Stadium of Light; Attendance: 47,751; Referee: Howard Webb

28 August 2011 3	Newcastle United	2–1	Fulham	Newcastle upon Tyne
13:00 BST	Best 48', 66'; Simpson (yellow card) 87'; Smith (yellow card) 90+5'	Report	Sidwell (yellow card) 64'; Dempsey 88'	Stadium: St James' Park; Attendance: 42,684 (433 Fulham); Referee: Kevin Friend

12 September 2011 4	Queens Park Rangers	0–0	Newcastle United	London
20:00 BST		Report		Stadium: Loftus Road; Attendance: 16,211 (1,279 Newcastle); Referee: Phil Dowd

17 September 2011 5	Aston Villa	1–1	Newcastle United	Birmingham
15:00 BST	Agbonlahor 13'	Report	Best 57'	Stadium: Villa Park; Attendance: 34,248; Referee: Neil Swarbrick

24 September 2011 6	Newcastle United	3–1	Blackburn Rovers	Newcastle upon Tyne
15:00 BST	Ba 27', 30', 54'	Report	Hoilett 37'; Olsson (yellow card) 55' (yellow-red card) 69'	Stadium: St James' Park; Attendance: 46,236 (1,174 Blackburn); Referee: Martin Atkinson

1 October 2011 7	Wolverhampton Wanderers	1–2	Newcastle United	Wolverhampton
15:00 BST	Fletcher 88'	Report	Ba 17'; Gutiérrez 38'	Stadium: Molineux Stadium; Attendance: 26,561 (1,350 Newcastle); Referee: Mark Halsey

16 October 2011 8	Newcastle United	2–2	Tottenham Hotspur	Newcastle upon Tyne
16:00 BST	Ba 48'; Sh. Ameobi 86'	Report	Van der Vaart 40' (pen.); Defoe 68'	Stadium: St James' Park; Attendance: 46,420 (2,450 Tottenham); Referee: Lee Probert

22 October 2011 9	Newcastle United	1–0	Wigan Athletic	Newcastle upon Tyne
15:00 BST	Cabaye 81'	Report		Stadium: St James' Park; Attendance: 48,321; Referee: Neil Swarbrick

31 October 2011 10	Stoke City	1–3	Newcastle United	Stoke-on-Trent
20:00 GMT	Walters 75' (pen.)	Report	Ba 12', 40', 81' (pen.)	Stadium: Britannia Stadium; Attendance: 26,564; Referee: Mike Dean

5 November 2011 11	Newcastle United	2–1	Everton	Newcastle upon Tyne
12:45 GMT	Heitinga 12' (o.g.); R. Taylor 29'	Report	Rodwell 45+2'	Stadium: St James' Park; Attendance: 50,671 (2,061 Everton); Referee: Andre Marriner

19 November 2011 12	Manchester City	3–1	Newcastle United	Manchester
15:00 GMT	Balotelli 41' (pen.); Richards 44'; Agüero 72' (pen.)	Report	Gosling 89'	Stadium: City of Manchester Stadium; Attendance: 47,408 (1,786 away); Referee: Chris Foy

26 November 2011 13	Manchester United	1–1	Newcastle United	Trafford
15:00 GMT	Hernández 49'	Report	Ba 64' (pen.); Gutiérrez (yellow card) 65' (yellow-red card) 78'	Stadium: Old Trafford; Attendance: 75,594 (1,800 Newcastle); Referee: Mike Jones

3 December 2011 14	Newcastle United	0–3	Chelsea	Newcastle upon Tyne
12:45 GMT		Report	Drogba 38'; Kalou 85'; Sturridge 90+2'	Stadium: St James' Park; Attendance: 52,305 (2,987 Chelsea); Referee: Mike Dean

10 December 2011 15	Norwich City	4–2	Newcastle United	Norwich
15:00 GMT	Hoolahan 39'; Holt 59', 82'; Morison 63'	Report	Ba 45+1', 71'; Gosling (red card) 66'	Stadium: Carrow Road; Attendance: 26,816; Referee: Martin Atkinson

17 December 2011 16	Newcastle United	0–0	Swansea City	Newcastle upon Tyne
15:00 GMT		Report		Stadium: St James' Park; Attendance: 51,767 (1,200 Swansea); Referee: Lee Mason

21 December 2011 17	Newcastle United	2–3	West Bromwich Albion	Newcastle upon Tyne
19:45 GMT	Ba 34', 81'	Report	Odemwingie 20'; McAuley 44'; Scharner 85'	Stadium: St James' Park; Attendance: 51,060 (800 West Brom); Referee: Anthony Taylor

26 December 2011 18	Bolton Wanderers	0–2	Newcastle United	Bolton
15:00 GMT		Report	Ben Arfa 69'; Ba 71'	Stadium: Reebok Stadium; Attendance: 26,080; Referee: Peter Walton

30 December 2011 19	Liverpool	3–1	Newcastle United	Liverpool
19:45 GMT	Bellamy 29', 67'; Gerrard 78'	Report	Agger 25' (o.g.)	Stadium: Anfield; Attendance: 44,372 (2,000 Newcastle); Referee: Lee Probert

4 January 2012 20	Newcastle United	3–0	Manchester United	Newcastle upon Tyne
20:00 GMT	Ba 33'; Cabaye 47'; Jones 90' (o.g.)	Report		Stadium: St James' Park; Attendance: 52,299 (3,098 Manchester United); Referee: Howard Webb

15 January 2012 21	Newcastle United	1–0	Queens Park Rangers	Newcastle upon Tyne
13:30 GMT	Best 37'	Report		Stadium: St James' Park; Attendance: 49,865 (1,300 QPR); Referee: Chris Foy

21 January 2012 22	Fulham	5–2	Newcastle United	London
15:00 GMT	Murphy 52' (pen.); Dempsey 59', 65', 89'; Zamora 68' (pen.)	Report	Guthrie 43'; Ben Arfa 85'	Stadium: Craven Cottage; Attendance: 25,692; Referee: Lee Mason

1 February 2012 23	Blackburn Rovers	0–2	Newcastle United	Blackburn
20:00 GMT		Report	Dann 12' (o.g.); Obertan 90+2'	Stadium: Ewood Park; Attendance: 20,817; Referee: Phil Dowd

5 February 2012 24	Newcastle United	2–1	Aston Villa	Newcastle upon Tyne
13:30 GMT	Ba 30'; Cissé 71'	Report	Keane 45+5'	Stadium: St James' Park; Attendance: 48,569 (1,467 Villa); Referee: Mark Halsey

11 February 2012 25	Tottenham Hotspur	5–0	Newcastle United	London
17:30 GMT	Assou-Ekotto 4'; Saha 6', 20'; Kranjčar 34'; Adebayor 64'	Report		Stadium: White Hart Lane; Attendance: 36,176; Referee: Andre Marriner

25 February 2012 26	Newcastle United	2–2	Wolverhampton Wanderers	Newcastle upon Tyne
15:00 GMT	Cissé 6'; Gutiérrez 18'	Report	Jarvis 50'; Doyle 66'	Stadium: St James' Park; Attendance: 52,287 (1,562 Wolves); Referee: Peter Walton

4 March 2012 27	Newcastle United	1–1	Sunderland	Newcastle upon Tyne
12:00 GMT	Sh. Ameobi 90+1'	Report	Bendtner 24'; Sessègnon (red card) 58'; Cattermole (red card) 90+6'	Stadium: St James' Park; Attendance: 52,388 (2,650 Sunderland); Referee: Mike Dean
Note: Lee Cattermole was sent off for foul and abusive language after the match ended, and was accredited at the time of the full time whistle.

12 March 2012 28	Arsenal	2–1	Newcastle United	London
20:00 GMT	Van Persie 15'; Vermaelen 90+5'	Report	Ben Arfa 14'	Stadium: Emirates Stadium; Attendance: 60,095; Referee: Howard Webb

18 March 2012 29	Newcastle United	1–0	Norwich City	Newcastle upon Tyne
16:00 GMT	Cissé 11'	Report	E. Bennett (yellow card) 62'; Whitbread (yellow card) 78'; Naughton (yellow card) 90+3'	Stadium: St James' Park; Attendance: 47,833; Referee: Phil Dowd

25 March 2012 30	West Bromwich Albion	1–3	Newcastle United	West Bromwich
16:00 BST	Long 52'	Report	Cissé 6', 34'; Ben Arfa 12'; Williamson (yellow card) 69'	Stadium: The Hawthorns; Attendance: 25,049; Referee: Chris Foy

1 April 2012 31	Newcastle United	2–0	Liverpool	Newcastle upon Tyne
13:30 BST	Cissé 19', 59', (yellow card) 30'; Tioté (yellow card) 48'; Perch (yellow card) 82'	Report	Carroll (yellow card) 10'; Shelvey (yellow card) 17'; Flanagan (yellow card) 45'; Reina (red card) 81'	Stadium: St James' Park; Attendance: 52,363; Referee: Martin Atkinson

6 April 2012 32	Swansea City	0–2	Newcastle United	Swansea
16:30 BST		Report	Cissé 5', 69'	Stadium: Liberty Stadium; Attendance: 19,874; Referee: Howard Webb

9 April 2012 33	Newcastle United	2–0	Bolton Wanderers	Newcastle upon Tyne
15:00 BST	Ben Arfa 73'; Cissé 83'	Report		Stadium: St James' Park; Attendance: 52,264; Referee: Mike Jones

21 April 2012 34	Newcastle United	3–0	Stoke City	Newcastle upon Tyne
15:00 BST	Cabaye 14', 57'; Cissé 18'	Report		Stadium: St James' Park; Attendance: 52,162; Referee: Andre Marriner

28 April 2012 35	Wigan Athletic	4–0	Newcastle United	Wigan
15:00 BST	Moses 13', 15'; Maloney 36'; Di Santo 45'	Report		Stadium: DW Stadium; Attendance: 22,187; Referee: Mike Dean

2 May 2012 36	Chelsea	0–2	Newcastle United	London
19:45 BST		Report	Cissé 19', 90+4'	Stadium: Stamford Bridge; Attendance: 41,559; Referee: Mark Halsey

6 May 2012 37	Newcastle United	0–2	Manchester City	Newcastle upon Tyne
13:30 BST		Report	Y. Touré 70', 89'	Stadium: St James' Park; Attendance: 52,389; Referee: Howard Webb

13 May 2012 38	Everton	3–1	Newcastle United	Liverpool
20:00 BST	Pienaar 16'; Jelavić 27'; Heitinga 65'	Report	Hibbert 73' (o.g.)	Stadium: Goodison Park; Attendance: 39,517; Referee: Andre Marriner

=== FA Cup ===
Round	3	4
Ground	H	A
Result	2–1	0–1

7 January 2012 Round 3	Newcastle United	2–1	Blackburn Rovers	Newcastle upon Tyne
15:00 GMT	Ben Arfa 70'; Gutiérrez 90+5'	Report	Goodwillie 35'	Stadium: St James' Park; Attendance: 30,876; Referee: Kevin Friend

28 January 2012 Round 4	Brighton & Hove Albion	1–0	Newcastle United	Falmer
15:00 GMT	Williamson 76' (o.g.)	Report		Stadium: Falmer Stadium; Attendance: 21,558; Referee: Lee Probert

=== League Cup ===
Round	2	3	4
Ground	A	A	A
Result	2–1	4–3	3–4

25 August 2011 Round 2	Scunthorpe	1–2 (a.e.t.)	Newcastle United	Scunthorpe
19:45 BST	Dagnall 15'	Report	R. Taylor 80'; Sa. Ameobi 112'	Stadium: Glanford Park; Attendance: 4,408; Referee: Graham Salisbury

20 September 2011 Round 3	Nottingham Forest	3–4 (a.e.t.)	Newcastle United	Nottingham
19:45 BST	Findley 46'; Derbyshire 66'; Tudgay 114'	Report	Løvenkrands 39', 60' (pen.); Simpson 93'; Coloccini 120+2'	Stadium: City Ground; Attendance: 10,208; Referee: Lee Mason

25 October 2011 Round 4	Blackburn Rovers	4–3 (a.e.t.)	Newcastle United	Blackburn
19:45 BST	Rochina 5'; Yakubu 64' (pen.); Pedersen 99'; Givet 120'	Report	Guthrie 90+3'; Cabaye 90+6'; Løvenkrands 105+3' (pen.)	Stadium: Ewood Park; Attendance: 10,682; Referee: Bobby Madley
