= 2010–11 Newcastle United F.C. season =

Newcastle United
2010–11 season
- Chairman: Derek Llambias
- Manager: Chris Hughton (until 6 December); Peter Beardsley (caretaker) (6 to 9 December); Alan Pardew (from 9 December)
- Stadium: St James' Park
- Premier League: 12th
- FA Cup: Third round
- League Cup: Fourth round
- Top goalscorer: League: Kevin Nolan (12); All: Kevin Nolan (12)
- Highest home attendance: 51,988 (31 October 2010 vs Sunderland, Premier League)
- Lowest home attendance: 33,157 (27 October 2010 vs Arsenal, League Cup)
- Average home league attendance: 46,990
Home colours	Away colours	Third colours

The 2010–11 season marked the return of Newcastle United to the Premier League following a season in the Championship. They finished in 12th place.

Newcastle's early season form was erratic on their return to English football's top tier, with thrashings of Aston Villa and local rivals Sunderland and exceptional away victories at Everton and Arsenal offset by home defeats against Blackpool, Blackburn Rovers and Stoke City.

After a win over Arsenal sent Newcastle to fifth in the league, the team went on a winless run that ended in the controversial sacking of manager Chris Hughton in December. The club swiftly appointed Alan Pardew, last of third-tier Southampton, although Newcastle fans were suspicious due to alleged links with the club's unpopular owners. Despite the club's form still being reasonable, the owner's popularity decreased further after the January transfer deadline day sale of local hero Andy Carroll for £35 million to Liverpool. The club pulled off one of the Premier League's greatest ever comebacks to draw 4–4 with Arsenal at St James' Park after being 4–0 down at half-time.

== Season summary ==
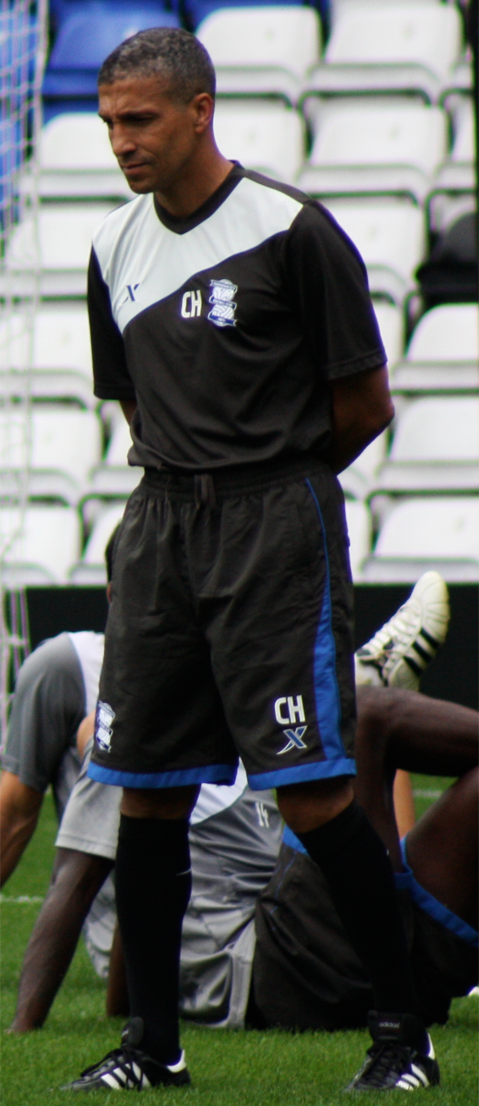
Chris Hughton

During the summer of 2010, Chris Hughton completed the signings of defender James Perch from Nottingham Forest, young midfielder Dan Gosling from Everton after an administrative error at Goodison Park allowed the 20-year-old to move to Newcastle on a free transfer and experienced centre-half Sol Campbell from Arsenal also on a free in preparation for life back in the Premier League. Towards the end of the transfer window, Ivory Coast international and defensive midfielder Cheick Tioté was also signed by the club from Twente for a reported £3.5 million, while Hatem Ben Arfa was brought in on a season long loan from Marseille for a reported £2 million, with the view of a permanent move for a further £5 million should he make more than 25 appearances for the club. This season also saw the departure of captain Nicky Butt, who opted to retire from football, and Fabrice Pancrate due to his contract expiring and no new deal being agreed.

Although the opening match of the season away to Manchester United saw the Magpies lose 3–0, they continue to remain unbeaten at St James' Park with a 6–0 victory over Aston Villa on 22 August 2010, which welcomed a hat-trick from the new number nine Andy Carroll, as well as Joey Barton shaving his moustache, which was part of the "Magpies Moustache Challenge". For their next match away at Wolverhampton Wanderers, they drew 1–1, Carroll again scoring with people calling for a call up to the senior England squad for the 21-year-old. After an international break, an excited, large crowd accumulated at a bouncing, atmospheric St James' Park for the following clash against Blackpool. A 2–0 defeat left the club ending their unbeaten record at St James' Park. New signing Tioté made his debut and Hatem Ben Arfa started his first game for the following match against Everton, while Sol Campbell was still not nearing match fitness. The game ended with a 1–0 victory, sending them to fifth position in the table. Newcastle continued their impressive run of form with an excellent and unexpected 4–3 win at Stamford Bridge against Chelsea in the League Cuo. The following league fixture saw Stoke City at St James' Park, which ended in a disappointing 2–1 defeat.

An away game to Manchester City followed seeing another 2–1 defeat for Newcastle, but also saw midfielder Hatem Ben Arfa suffer a horrific double leg break following a clash with City midfielder Nigel de Jong. The club demanded action on De Jong, claiming Ben Arfa faced a lengthy spell on the sidelines. Ben Arfa's agent also claimed that De Jong had not apologised to Ben Arfa. A 2–2 draw at St James' Park with Wigan Athletic followed, with ex-midfielder Charles N'Zogbia scoring the two openers for Wigan before a Shola Ameobi goal made it 2–1 with 15 minutes left, and in the dying seconds defender Fabricio Coloccini powered a header past goalkeeper Ali Al-Habsi to rescue a point for Newcastle.

The team got back on track after a three-game winless run when they defeated bottom of the table West Ham United 2–1 at Upton Park on 23 October. Newcastle had gone behind after only 12 minutes thanks to a Carlton Cole goal, but quickly turned things around with captain Kevin Nolan equalising ten minutes later and Andy Carroll grabbing the winner with 20 minutes left.

The club faced more controversy when striker Andy Carroll was arrested for a reported attack on his ex-girlfriend at her home in Newcastle, to which he pleaded self-defense. He was released on bail on 18 October.

Newcastle's good form was lost in a 2–1 defeat to Blackburn Rovers at home, going 1–0 down after just two minutes with a goal from Morten Gamst Pedersen. Striker Andy Carroll got an equaliser early in the second half only for Newcastle to go behind again late after a goal from Jason Roberts. Joey Barton received a three match ban for punching Gamst Pedersen and Shola Ameobi suffered a hamstring injury. Newcastle's poor home form continued after they played to a 0–0 draw against Fulham. Danny Guthrie replaced a suspended Barton only to be substituted for Wayne Routledge later on; Peter Løvenkrands replaced Ameobi who was then substituted for Nile Ranger. Carroll was given Man of the Match after getting many chances and good shots only for them to be blocked by Fulham goalkeeper Mark Schwarzer or cleared off the line.

=== Alan Pardew ===
Controversy once again hit the club as Chris Hughton was sacked on 6 December 2010 following Newcastle's 3–1 defeat to West Bromwich Albion. The Newcastle United board stated that "the board now feels an individual with more managerial experience is needed to take the club forward". Hughton's dismissal was an unpopular decision with the fans and the players, and was highly criticized by many pundits.

On 9 December 2010, Alan Pardew was named as his replacement. He expressed delight at the role and claimed he had nothing but respect for Hughton's achievements and insisted he was excited and looking forward to his new challenge at the club.

Pardew had a notable first game, seeing a 3–1 victory over Liverpool, however the Christmas period saw 2 matches lost to Manchester City and Tottenham. The squad regained form with a win over Wigan, and an energetic 5–0 win over his former club West Ham United F.C. The club was then however embarrassed by a 3–1 loss to League Two side Stevenage in the FA Cup third round.

Upon the transfer window opening, Pardew hinted at the possibility of bringing David Beckham to the club on a loan move from the LA Galaxy. It was also reported the club were looking to sign a striker, with Sebastian Larsson reported to be of interest. Pardew stated he wanted to sign two players following the defeat to Stevenage, and also insisted he wished for Alan Smith to stay with the club amid reports linking him with a return to Leeds United.

16 January 2011 saw Pardew's first Tyne–Wear derby in charge saw the Magpies gather a point after a disappointing 1–1 draw; Newcastle were on the front foot for much of the game and a 50th minute back-heel goal from skipper Kevin Nolan gave the away team a 1–0 lead, but Asamoah Gyan saved Sunderland from defeat with a 94th-minute goal after Steve Harper deflected a shot from Phil Bardsley into the path of the Ghanaian and Sunderland gained the point.

Newcastle would continue their undefeated form, but not how they would have like. On 22 January 2011, Newcastle faced Tottenham Hotspur at St James' Park. The game would be very much end-to-end throughout until Fabricio Coloccini opened the scoring to give Newcastle a 1–0 lead. However, another injury time goal from the opposition meant Newcastle had dropped another two points. Manager Alan Pardew has stated that the team had "committed too many bodies forward to try and get a second".

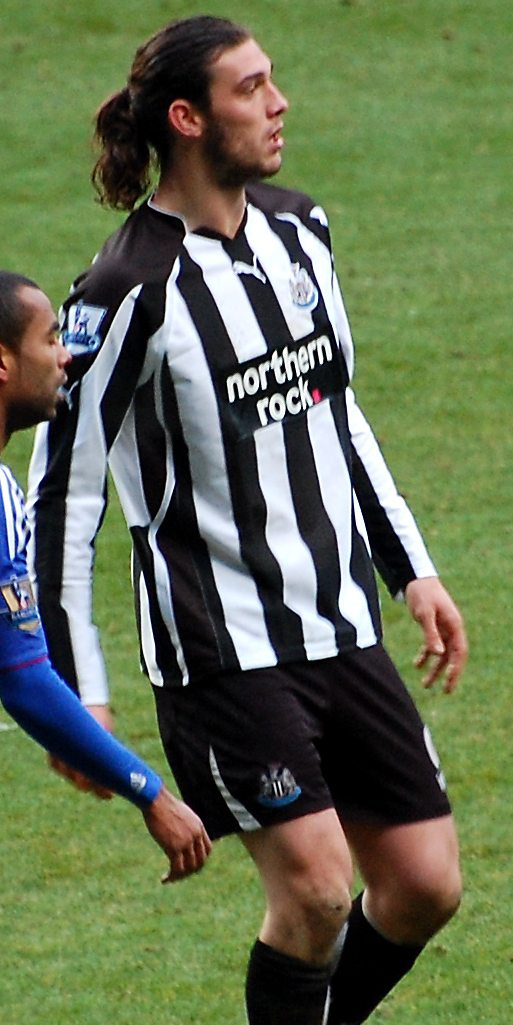
Andy Carroll: sold to Liverpool in 2011

Spurs manager Harry Redknapp denied interest in bringing striker Andy Carroll to Tottenham. However, following two rejected bids from Liverpool, Carroll became the most expensive British player transfer in history as Liverpool signed a £35 million deal for the striker. Carroll's sale caused controversy for the club as manager Alan Pardew stated his regret at losing Carroll, insisting he wanted a new contract and was not pushed out by the club, while Carroll contradicted Pardew's claim, stating he did not want to go but was forced by managing director Derek Llambias to hand in a transfer request. Pardew stated the £35m received from Liverpool had been promised to him for summer transfer funds for the 2012 season.

Stephen Ireland then joined the club on loan till the end of the season from Aston Villa.

5 February 2011 saw Newcastle pull off a remarkable comeback against Arsenal at St James' Park. Theo Walcott gave Arsenal a 1–0 lead inside just 43 seconds, Johan Djourou put Arsenal 2–0 up on three minutes, then Robin van Persie added insult to injury with a third goal inside the tenth minute. Arsenal went in at half time 4–0 up after another goal from Van Persie, however early in the second half Arsenal's Abou Diaby was shown a straight red card for pushing Midfielders Joey Barton and Kevin Nolan after what he felt to be a bad tackle in which replays showed was legal. It was all downhill for Arsenal from there. Barton slipped a coolly taken penalty in to make 4–1, then Leon Best made it 4–2 with a thumping close range effort not long after a goal he scored just before had been judged offside. Another penalty gave Newcastle hope with Barton scoring again, and the returning midfielder Cheick Tioté scored a phenomenal volley from 30 yards to give Newcastle a well-deserved point with the final score being a massive 4–4 draw. This was the first time any Premier League club had ever come back from being 4–0. Newcastle were not beaten by Arsenal in the 2010–11 Premier League season, having beating them 1–0 at the Emirates Stadium earlier in the season under Chris Hughton's management.

On 10 February 2011, former Finland international Shefki Kuqi joined Newcastle for the remainder of the season.

Newcastle finished in 12th place, a reasonable position on the team's first year back, but slightly tempered after the team looked set to finish ninth until they threw away a 3–0 lead against West Brom on the final day of the season.

== Chronological list of events ==
- 5 July 2010: Newcastle United complete the signing of Nottingham Forest defender James Perch.
- 22 July 2010: Dan Gosling signs on a four-year contract.
- 23 July 2010: Squad numbers are announced for the coming season.
- 28 July 2010: Sol Campbell signs on a one-year contract.
- 3 August 2010: Newcastle United win the Teresa Herrera Trophy after a 5–3 penalty shootout victory over Deportivo de La Coruña.
- 16 August 2010: 1,800 Newcastle fans travel to Old Trafford for Newcastle's first game back in the Premier League, a 3–0 loss at the hands of Manchester United.
- 22 August 2010: Sky Sports report Newcastle have agreed a deal with Twente for Ivorian international Cheick Tioté.
- 22 August 2010: Newcastle win their first home game of the season with Andy Carroll scoring a hat-trick in a 6–0 victory at home to Aston Villa.
- 25 August 2010: Newcastle release a statement saying that Steven Taylor has been placed on the transfer list, with the 24-year-old defender failing to agree to a contract extension, apparently asking for wages of £60,000 a week.
- 27 August 2010: Newcastle confirm the signing of Cheick Tioté.
- 28 August 2010: Newcastle confirm the signing of midfielder Hatem Ben Arfa from Marseille on a season-long loan with a view to a permanent transfer.
- 1 September 2010: The transfer window shuts with no more signings being made by Newcastle, and Steven Taylor remains without a new contract.
- 11 September 2010: Newcastle's 26-game unbeaten home record at St James' Park is ended with a 2–0 loss to Blackpool.
- 18 September 2010: Hatem Ben Arfa scores on his first start for Newcastle in a 1–0 win at Everton, their first at Goodison Park in nine years.
- 22 September 2010: Newcastle cause one of the biggest upsets of the League Cup third round, knocking out last season's double winners, Chelsea, 4–3 at Stamford Bridge, Newcastle's first win at Stamford Bridge since November 1986. Nile Ranger, Ryan Taylor and Shola Ameobi (2) score to send Newcastle into the fourth round; Patrick van Aanholt and Nicolas Anelka (2) score Chelsea's goals.
- 3 October 2010: Hatem Ben Arfa is ruled out until March at the earliest with a broken leg, after a tackle by Manchester City player Nigel de Jong in a 2–1 loss at Eastlands.
- 25 October 2010: Andy Carroll's court case for attacking a man in Newcastle's Blu Bambu sees him fined £1,000 and ordered to pay £2,500 compensation.
- 27 October 2010: Newcastle are eliminated from the League Cup at the last-16 stage with a 4–0 trouncing by Arsenal, after a Tim Krul own goal, two goals from Theo Walcott and another by Nicklas Bendtner. After the game, Chris Hughton revealed that the club were standing by him and were to open negotiation talks for a new contract, but not until the end of this year.
- 31 October 2010: Halloween on Tyneside sees the return of the Tyne-Wear derby, with Sunderland visiting St James' Park. Newcastle thrash Sunderland 5–1 with a hat-trick by Kevin Nolan and two goals by Shola Ameobi.
- 11 November 2010: Newcastle and Joey Barton accept the FA's charges brought against him for punching Blackburn Rovers winger Morten Gamst Pedersen. Barton is banned for three matches.
- 17 November 2010: Andy Carroll makes his debut for England in a 2–1 defeat by France, starting up front on his own in a 4–5–1 formation, with Sunderland midfielder Jordan Henderson and Arsenal left-back Kieran Gibbs. He plays for 70 minutes before being replaced by Cardiff City striker and fellow debutant Jay Bothroyd, also making his debut. England coach Fabio Capello later reveals Carroll will definitely be in the next England squad.
- 20 November 2010: Newcastle United are thrashed 5–1 by Bolton Wanderers at the Reebok Stadium. Kevin Davies, Lee Chung-yong and Johan Elmander all score for Bolton before Andy Carroll pulls one back for the Tynesiders, but after another goal from Elmander Fabricio Coloccini is sent off for elbowing the Swedish striker. Davies compounds Newcastle's misery with a 90th-minute penalty. To make matters worse for Newcastle, Mike Williamson is suspended for the games against Chelsea, West Bromwich Albion and Liverpool after a review of a challenge he made during the match.
- 6 December 2010: The club announce they have sacked Chris Hughton.

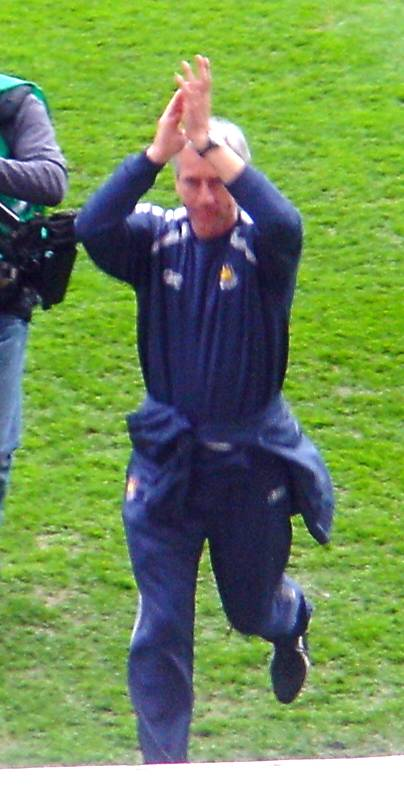
Alan Pardew

- 9 December 2010: Alan Pardew is appointed as the new manager of Newcastle, signing a deal until 2016.
- 11 December 2010: Pardew's first game in charge ends in victory as Newcastle beat Liverpool 3–1 at home with goals from Kevin Nolan, Joey Barton and Andy Carroll.
- 5 January 2011: Sky Sports report Newcastle have agreed a deal with Marseille to sign Hatem Ben Arfa on a four-and-a-half-year deal.
- 5 January 2011: Leon Best scores a hat-trick, his first goals for Newcastle, as the Toon thrash Premier League strugglers West Ham United 5–0.
- 8 January 2011: Newcastle are eliminated from the FA Cup by League Two side Stevenage – in their first ever season in the Football League – with a 3–1 loss at Broadhall Way.
- 31 January 2011: Liverpool purchase striker Andy Carroll for a club record fee of £35 million. Liverpool's initial bid of £30 million was rejected, as was their improved offer of £35 million, but this was eventually accepted after Carroll handed in a transfer request.
- 31 January 2011: Newcastle sign Aston Villa midfielder Stephen Ireland on loan until the end of the season.
- 5 February 2011: Newcastle witness the greatest Premier League comeback of all time at St James' Park as Arsenal visit Tyneside. Arsenal are 3–0 up within ten minutes and 4–0 up by half-time, but the sending off of Abou Diaby proved to be a turning point. Two Joey Barton penalties sandwiching a goal from Leon Best gave Newcastle unlikely hope for somehow gaining a point, before Cheick Tioté smashed in a 30-yard volley to make the score 4–4. Newcastle could have improbably yet gained all three points, but Kevin Nolan's late strike on goal was inches wide. Nonetheless, securing a point which, for 45 minutes, looked unbelievably impossible to salvage, was something for Newcastle to be proud of.
- 10 February 2011: Newcastle sign Finnish striker Shefki Kuqi until the end of the season.
- 7 May 2011: Newcastle's penultimate home game of the season saw them secure Premier League safety with a hard-fought 2–1 victory over Birmingham City.
- 22 May 2011: On the final day of the 2010–11 Premier League season, Newcastle welcomed West Bromwich Albion to St James' Park. Newcastle led 3–0 through Steven Taylor, Peter Løvenkrands and an own goal from Jonas Olsson, but threw it away to eventually draw 3–3, with Somen Tchoyi scoring a hat-trick for the Baggies.

== Club ==
=== Coaching staff ===
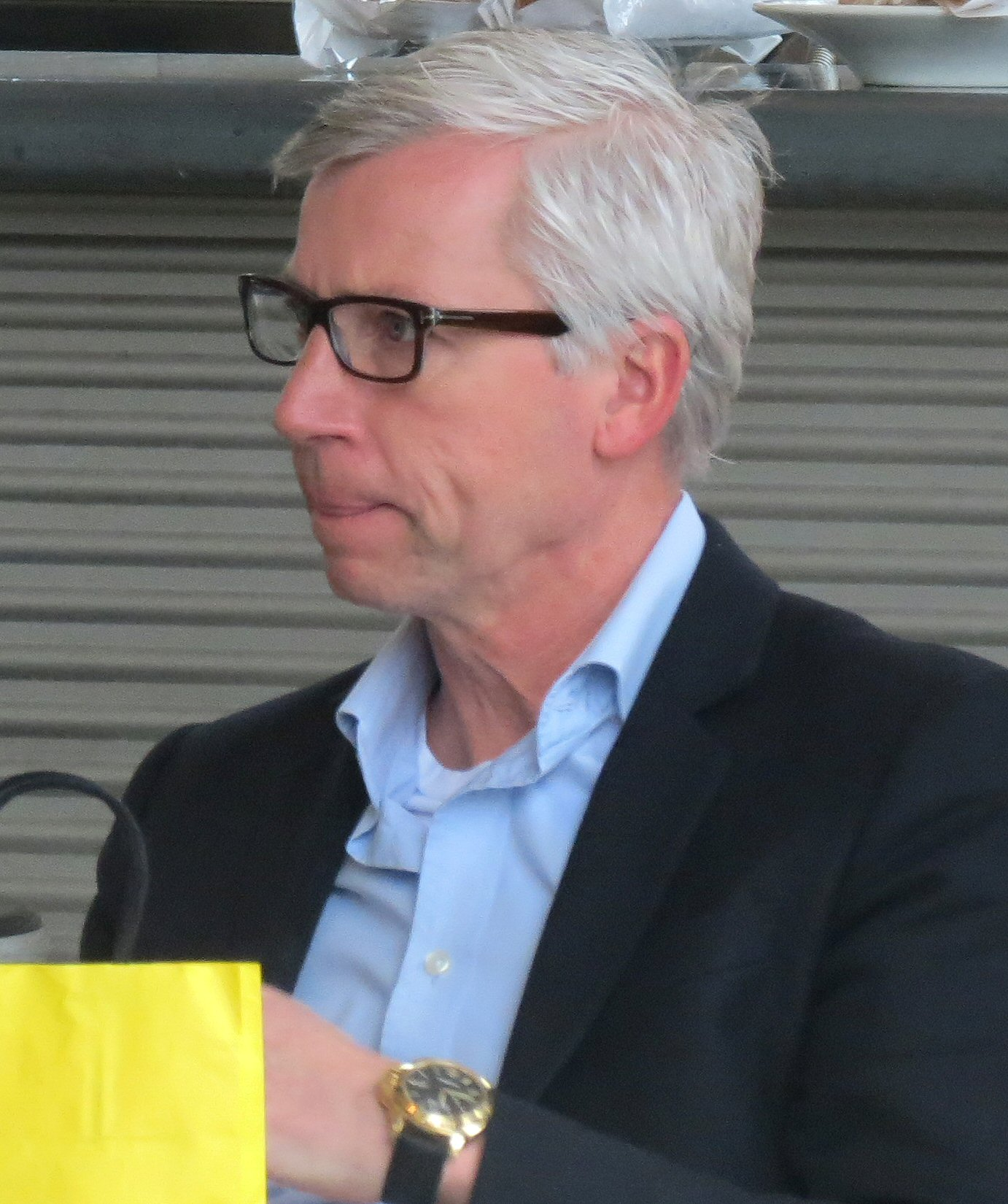
Alan Pardew in February 2012

Position	Staff
Manager	(England) Alan Pardew
Assistant manager	(England) Peter Beardsley
First team coach	(England) Steve Stone
Goalkeeping coach	(England) Andy Woodman
Development coach	(Scotland) Willie Donachie
Reserve team coach	(England) Lee Clark
Chief scout	(England) Graham Carr

Last updated: 3 May 2011

=== Team kit ===
The kit designer will be Puma and the sponsor will be Northern Rock. Leaks were released earlier in May showing a new black and white home kit, a blue away kit and a white third kit. These leaks were confirmed on 18 June 2010.

Home colours	Away colours	Third colours

== Players ==
=== First-team ===
Squad at end of season

Note: Flags indicate national team as defined under FIFA eligibility rules; some limited exceptions apply. Players may hold more than one non-FIFA nationality.

No.	Pos.	Nation	Player
1	GK	ENG	Steve Harper
2	DF	ARG	Fabricio Coloccini
3	DF	ESP	José Enrique
4	MF	ENG	Kevin Nolan
5	DF	ENG	Sol Campbell
6	DF	ENG	Mike Williamson
7	MF	ENG	Joey Barton
8	MF	ENG	Danny Guthrie
11	FW	DEN	Peter Løvenkrands
12	DF	ENG	Danny Simpson
14	DF	ENG	James Perch
15	MF	ENG	Dan Gosling
16	DF	ENG	Ryan Taylor
17	FW	ENG	Alan Smith
18	MF	ARG	Jonás Gutiérrez
20	FW	IRL	Leon Best

No.	Pos.	Nation	Player
22	MF	IRL	Stephen Ireland (on loan from Aston Villa)
23	FW	ENG	Shola Ameobi
24	MF	CIV	Cheick Tioté
25	MF	COD	Kazenga LuaLua
26	GK	NED	Tim Krul
27	DF	ENG	Steven Taylor
28	DF	HUN	Tamás Kádár
29	MF	SLO	Haris Vučkić
30	FW	ENG	Nile Ranger
31	MF	NIR	Shane Ferguson
32	FW	ENG	Ryan Donaldson
34	DF	ENG	James Tavernier
37	MF	FRA	Hatem Ben Arfa (on loan from Marseille)
38	FW	ENG	Phil Airey
42	FW	FIN	Shefki Kuqi
44	MF	ENG	Sammy Ameobi

=== Left club during season ===
Note: Flags indicate national team as defined under FIFA eligibility rules; some limited exceptions apply. Players may hold more than one non-FIFA nationality.

No.	Pos.	Nation	Player
9	FW	ENG	Andy Carroll (to Liverpool)
10	MF	ENG	Wayne Routledge (on loan to Queens Park Rangers)

No.	Pos.	Nation	Player
19	FW	ESP	Xisco (on loan to Deportivo La Coruña)
21	GK	ENG	Fraser Forster (on loan to Celtic)

=== Reserves ===
The following players did not appear for the first team this season.

Note: Flags indicate national team as defined under FIFA eligibility rules; some limited exceptions apply. Players may hold more than one non-FIFA nationality.

No.	Pos.	Nation	Player
33	GK	SWE	Ole Söderberg
35	MF	AUS	Bradden Inman
36	MF	ENG	Greg McDermott
39	FW	FRO	Jóan Símun Edmundsson
40	MF	ENG	Michael Richardson
45	DF	ENG	Paul Dummett
—	GK	ENG	Jak Alnwick
—	GK	ENG	Ben Robinson
—	DF	ENG	Matthew Grieve

No.	Pos.	Nation	Player
—	DF	ENG	Daniel Leadbitter
—	DF	ENG	Ben Tozer
—	MF	ENG	Conor Newton
—	MF	ENG	Ryan Page
—	MF	NIR	Paddy McLaughlin
—	MF	FRA	Yven Moyo
—	MF	ITA	Fabio Zamblera
—	FW	ENG	Aaron Spear
—	FW	COD	Andy Mogwo

=== Youth team ===
Note: Flags indicate national team as defined under FIFA eligibility rules; some limited exceptions apply. Players may hold more than one non-FIFA nationality.

No.	Pos.	Nation	Player
—	DF	ENG	Michael Hoganson
—	DF	ENG	Remie Streete
—	FW	ENG	Billy Ions

No.	Pos.	Nation	Player
—	FW	ENG	Dan Taylor
—	FW	SWE	Samuel Adjei

=== Trialists ===
The following players came to Newcastle as trialists this season.

Note: Flags indicate national team as defined under FIFA eligibility rules; some limited exceptions apply. Players may hold more than one non-FIFA nationality.

No.	Pos.	Nation	Player
—	MF	ENG	Billy Knott
—	MF	FRA	Nassim Boukhelifa

No.	Pos.	Nation	Player
—	MF	GAM	Alieu Darbo (on trial from Le Mans)

== Transfers ==
=== In ===
Date	Pos.	Name	From	Fee	Source
2010-07-05	DF	(England) James Perch	(England) Nottingham Forest	£1.5m	
2010-07-22	MF	(England) Dan Gosling	(England) Everton	Free	
2010-07-28	DF	(England) Sol Campbell	(England) Arsenal	Free	
2010-07-29	MF	(England) Michael Richardson	(England) Walker Central	Free	
2010-08-26	MF	(Ivory Coast) Cheick Tioté	(Netherlands) Twente	£3.5m	
2010-09-29	MF	(France) Yven Moyo	(France) Sochaux	Free	
2011-01-05	MF	(France) Hatem Ben Arfa	(France) Marseille	£2M loan fee + £5M	
2011-02-10	FW	(Finland) Shefki Kuqi	Free agent	Free	

- Total spending: ▼ ~ £12,000,000

=== Out ===
Date	Pos.	Name	To	Fee	Source
2010-06-30	MF	(France) Fabrice Pancrate	(Greece) AEL	Free	
2010-06-30	MF	(England) Nicky Butt	(Hong Kong) South China	Free	
2010-06-30	FW	(France) Wesley Ngo Baheng	(England) Aldershot Town	Free	
2010-06-30	FW	(Netherlands) Frank Wiafe Danquah	(Hungary) Ferencváros	Free	
2010-06-30	MF	(England) Jonny Godsmark	(England) Ashington	Free	
2010-06-30	DF	(England) Darren Lough	(England) Ashington	Free	
2010-06-30	MF	(England) Daniel Williams	Free agent	Free	
2010-06-30	DF	(England) James Taylor	(England) Ashington	Free	
2010-06-30	DF	(Republic of Ireland) Callum Morris	(England) Blyth Spartans	Free	
2010-07-05	GK	(England) Max Johnson	(Scotland) Inverness Caledonian Thistle	Free	
2010-07-12	MF	(Northern Ireland) Michael McCrudden	(Republic of Ireland) Derry City	Free	
2011-01-31	FW	(England) Andy Carroll	(England) Liverpool	£35m	

- Total income: ▲ ~ £35,000,000

=== Loans in ===
Date	Pos.	Name	From	Expiry	Source
2010-08-28	MF	(France) Hatem Ben Arfa	(France) Marseille	2011-01-05	
2011-01-31	MF	(Republic of Ireland) Stephen Ireland	(England) Aston Villa	2011-06-01	

=== Loans out ===
Date	Pos.	Name	To	Expiry	Source
2010-08-24	GK	(England) Fraser Forster	(Scotland) Celtic	2011-05-31	
2010-08-30	MF	(Democratic Republic of the Congo) Kazenga LuaLua	(England) Brighton & Hove Albion	2011-01-03	
2010-09-21	DF	(England) Ben Tozer	(England) Northampton Town	2011-06-01	
2011-01-07	DF	(England) James Tavernier	(England) Gateshead	2011-03-24	
2011-01-07	MF	(Faroe Islands) Jóan Símun Edmundsson	(England) Gateshead	2011-02-04	
2011-01-07	DF	(England) Matthew Grieve	(England) Stockport County	2011-02-07	
2011-01-10	DF	(Hungary) Tamás Kádár	(England) Huddersfield Town	2011-02-10	
2011-01-21	MF	(England) Wayne Routledge	(England) Queens Park Rangers	2011-06-01	
2011-01-24	FW	(England) Ryan Donaldson	(England) Hartlepool United	2011-03-25	
2011-01-31	FW	(Spain) Xisco	(Spain) Deportivo La Coruña	2011-06-01	

== Statistics ==
=== Appearances, goals and cards ===
Last updated on 22 May 2011.
(Substitute appearances in brackets)

No.	Pos.	Name	League		FA Cup		League Cup		Total		Discipline	
No.	Pos.	Name	Apps	Goals	Apps	Goals	Apps	Goals	Apps	Goals	Yellow card	Red card
1	GK	(England) Steve Harper	18	0	0	0	0	0	18	0	0	0
2	DF	(Argentina) Fabricio Coloccini	35	2	1	0	1	0	37	2	4	1
3	DF	(Spain) José Enrique	36	0	0	0	0	0	36	0	5	0
4	MF	(England) Kevin Nolan	30	12	1	0	0 (1)	0	31 (1)	12	10	0
5	DF	(England) Sol Campbell	4 (3)	0	0	0	1	0	5 (3)	0	1	0
6	DF	(England) Mike Williamson	28 (1)	0	1	0	1 (1)	0	30 (2)	0	5	0
7	MF	(England) Joey Barton	32	4	1	1	0 (2)	0	33 (2)	5	9	0
8	MF	(England) Danny Guthrie	11 (3)	0	0	0	1	0	12 (3)	0	3	0
9	FW	(England) Andy Carroll	18 (1)	11	0	0	0 (1)	0	18 (2)	11	4	0
10	MF	(England) Wayne Routledge	10 (7)	0	1	0	1	0	12 (7)	0	0	0
11	FW	(Denmark) Peter Løvenkrands	18 (7)	6	1	0	3	1	22 (7)	7	0	0
12	DF	(England) Danny Simpson	30	0	1	0	0	0	31	0	4	0
14	DF	(England) James Perch	9 (4)	0	1	0	1	0	11 (4)	0	6	0
15	MF	(England) Dan Gosling	0 (1)	0	0	0	0	0	0 (1)	0	0	0
16	DF	(England) Ryan Taylor	3 (2)	0	0	0	3	2	6 (2)	2	1	1
17	MF	(England) Alan Smith	7 (4)	0	1	0	2	0	10 (4)	0	5	0
18	MF	(Argentina) Jonás Gutiérrez	34 (3)	3	0	0	1 (1)	0	35 (4)	3	6	0
19	FW	(Spain) Xisco	0 (2)	0	0	0	0	0	0 (2)	0	0	0
20	FW	(Republic of Ireland) Leon Best	9 (2)	6	1	0	0	0	10 (2)	6	1	0
21	GK	(England) Fraser Forster	0	0	0	0	0	0	0	0	0	0
22	MF	(Republic of Ireland) Stephen Ireland	0 (2)	0	0	0	0	0	0 (2)	0	0	0
23	FW	(Nigeria) Shola Ameobi	21 (7)	6	0	0	2	3	23 (7)	9	3	0
24	MF	(Ivory Coast) Cheick Tioté	26	1	0 (1)	0	0 (1)	0	26 (2)	1	14	1
25	MF	(Democratic Republic of the Congo) Kazenga LuaLua	0 (2)	0	0	0	1	0	1 (2)	0	0	0
26	GK	(Netherlands) Tim Krul	20 (1)	0	1	0	3	0	24 (1)	0	0	0
27	DF	(England) Steven Taylor	12 (2)	3	0	0	0	0	12 (2)	3	0	0
28	DF	(Hungary) Tamás Kádár	0	0	0	0	2	0	2	0	1	0
29	MF	(Slovenia) Haris Vučkić	0	0	0	0	3	0	3	0	0	0
30	FW	(England) Nile Ranger	1 (23)	0	0 (1)	0	3	1	4 (24)	1	1	0
31	MF	(Northern Ireland) Shane Ferguson	3 (4)	0	0	0	2	0	5 (4)	0	0	0
32	FW	(England) Ryan Donaldson	0	0	0	0	1	0	1	0	0	0
34	DF	(England) James Tavernier	0	0	0	0	1	0	1	0	0	0
37	MF	(France) Hatem Ben Arfa	3 (1)	1	0	0	0	0	3 (1)	1	0	0
38	FW	(England) Phil Airey	0	0	0 (1)	0	0	0	0 (1)	0	0	0
42	FW	(Finland) Shefki Kuqi	0 (6)	0	0	0	0	0	0 (6)	0	0	0
44	FW	(England) Sammy Ameobi	0 (1)	0	0	0	0	0	0 (1)	0	0	0

=== Starting formations ===
Last updated on 22 May 2011.

Formation	League	FA Cup	League Cup	Total
4–4–2	28	1	3	32
4–4–1–1	8	0	0	8
4–5–1	1	0	0	1
5–3–2	1	0	0	1

=== Captains ===
Last updated on 22 May 2011.

No.	Pos.	Name	Starts
4	MF	(England) Kevin Nolan	31
7	MF	(England) Joey Barton	5
23	FW	(Nigeria) Shola Ameobi	3
17	MF	(England) Alan Smith	2
2	DF	(Argentina) Fabricio Coloccini	1

== Competitions ==
Win Draw Loss

=== Pre-season ===
Match	1	2	3	4	5
Result	3–0	1–2	2–2	0–0 (Pens: 5–3)	1–2

=== League ===
Round	1	2	3	4	5	6	7	8	9	10	11	12	13	14	15	16	17	18	19
Result	0–3	6–0	1–1	0–2	1–0	1–2	1–2	2–2	2–1	5–1	1–0	1–2	0–0	1–5	1–1	1–3	3–1	1–3	0–2
Position	17th	7th	8th	13th	5th	10th	15th	13th	9th	7th	5th	5th	8th	10th	9th	11th	8th	9th	12th

Round	20	21	22	23	24	25	26	27	28	29	30	31	32	33	34	35	36	37	38
Result	1–0	5–0	1–1	1–1	0–1	4–4	0–0	2–0	1–1	1–2	0–4	4–1	0–1	0–0	1–1	0–3	2–1	2–2	3–3
Position	10th	8th	9th	7th	10th	10th	10th	9th	9th	9th	11th	9th	9th	9th	9th	12th	10th	12th	12th

=== FA Cup ===
Match	1
Result	1–3

=== League Cup ===
Match	1	2	3
Result	3–2	4–3	0–4

== Matches ==
=== Pre-season ===
17 July 2010	Carlisle United	0–3	Newcastle United	Carlisle
13:00 BST		(Report)	Best 47'; Ranger 64'; Vučkić 73'	Stadium: Brunton Park; Attendance: 7,412; Referee: Eddie Ilderton

24 July 2010	Norwich City	2–1	Newcastle United	Norwich
15:00 BST	Martin 38', 74'	(Report)	Ameobi 46'	Stadium: Carrow Road; Attendance: 13,195; Referee: Fred Graham

31 July 2010	Newcastle United	2–2	PSV Eindhoven	Newcastle upon Tyne
15:00 BST	R. Taylor 51'; Best 73'	(Report)	Toivonen 10'; Dzsudzsák 40'	Stadium: St James' Park; Attendance: 16,118; Referee: Mike Jones

3 August 2010 T. Herrera Trophy	Deportivo de La Coruña	0–0 (3–5 p)	Newcastle United	Coruña
20:00 BST		(Report)		Stadium: Estadio Riazor; Attendance: 8,000; Referee: Ramírez Domínguez
	Penalties
	Zé Castro (penalty scored); Riki (penalty missed); Aythami (penalty scored); Guardado (penalty scored)		(penalty scored) Løvenkrands; (penalty scored) Nolan; (penalty scored) Carroll; (penalty scored) R. Taylor; (penalty scored) Barton

7 August 2010	Rangers	2–1	Newcastle United	Glasgow
13:00 BST	Miller 24'; Naismith 66'	(Report)	Løvenkrands 70'	Stadium: Ibrox Stadium; Attendance: 30,220; Referee: Dougie McDonald

=== League ===
16 August 2010 1	Manchester United	3–0	Newcastle United	Manchester
20:00 BST	Berbatov 33'; Fletcher 42'; Giggs 85'	(Report)		Stadium: Old Trafford; Attendance: 75,221; Referee: Chris Foy

22 August 2010 2	Newcastle United	6–0	Aston Villa	Newcastle upon Tyne
13:30 BST	Barton 12'; Nolan 31', 87'; Carroll 34', 67', 90+3'	(Report)		Stadium: St James' Park; Attendance: 43,546; Referee: Martin Atkinson

28 August 2010 3	Wolverhampton Wanderers	1–1	Newcastle United	Wolverhampton
15:00 BST	Ebanks-Blake 43'	(Report)	Carroll 62'	Stadium: Molineux; Attendance: 27,745; Referee: Stuart Attwell

11 September 2010 4	Newcastle United	0–2	Blackpool	Newcastle upon Tyne
15:00 BST		(Report)	Adam 45' (pen.); Campbell 90'	Stadium: St James' Park; Attendance: 49,597; Referee: Lee Mason

18 September 2010 5	Everton	0–1	Newcastle United	Liverpool
15:00 BST		(Report)	Ben Arfa 45'	Stadium: Goodison Park; Attendance: 38,019; Referee: Andre Marriner

26 September 2010 6	Newcastle United	1–2	Stoke City	Newcastle upon Tyne
16:10 BST	Nolan 43' (pen.)	(Report)	Jones 67'; Perch 85' (o.g.)	Stadium: St James' Park; Attendance: 41,915; Referee: Mike Jones

3 October 2010 7	Manchester City	2–1	Newcastle United	Manchester
13:30 BST	Tevez 18' (pen.); Johnson 75'	(Report)	Gutiérrez 24'	Stadium: City of Manchester Stadium; Attendance: 46,067; Referee: Martin Atkinson

16 October 2010 8	Newcastle United	2–2	Wigan Athletic	Newcastle upon Tyne
15:00 BST	Ameobi 72'; Coloccini 90+4'	(Report)	N'Zogbia 22', 23'	Stadium: St James' Park; Attendance: 44,415; Referee: Mark Halsey

23 October 2010 9	West Ham United	1–2	Newcastle United	London
17:30 BST	Cole 12'	(Report)	Nolan 23'; Carroll 69'	Stadium: Boleyn Ground; Attendance: 34,486; Referee: Chris Foy

31 October 2010 10	Newcastle United	5–1	Sunderland	Newcastle upon Tyne
13:30 GMT	Nolan 26', 34', 75'; Ameobi 45+3' (pen.), 70'	(Report)	Bramble (red card) 53'; Bent 90+1'	Stadium: St James' Park; Attendance: 51,988; Referee: Phil Dowd

7 November 2010 11	Arsenal	0–1	Newcastle United	London
13:30 GMT	Koscielny (red card) 90+2'	(Report)	Carroll 45'	Stadium: Emirates Stadium; Attendance: 60,059; Referee: Mike Dean

10 November 2010 12	Newcastle United	1–2	Blackburn Rovers	Newcastle upon Tyne
19:45 GMT	Carroll 47'	(Report)	Gamst Pedersen 3'; Roberts 82'	Stadium: St James' Park; Attendance: 41,053; Referee: Mike Jones

13 November 2010 13	Newcastle United	0–0	Fulham	Newcastle upon Tyne
15:00 GMT		(Report)		Stadium: St James' Park; Attendance: 44,686; Referee: Lee Probert

20 November 2010 14	Bolton Wanderers	5–1	Newcastle United	Bolton
15:00 GMT	Davies 18' (pen.), 90+3' (pen.); Lee 39'; Elmander 50', 72'	(Report)	Carroll 52'; Coloccini (red card) 76'	Stadium: Reebok Stadium; Attendance: 22,203; Referee: Howard Webb

28 November 2010 15	Newcastle United	1–1	Chelsea	Newcastle upon Tyne
13:30 GMT	Carroll 6'	(Report)	Kalou 45'	Stadium: St James' Park; Attendance: 46,469; Referee: Andre Marriner

5 December 2010 16	West Bromwich Albion	3–1	Newcastle United	West Bromwich
13:30 GMT	Tchoyi 32'; Odemwingie 71', 89'	(Report)	Løvenkrands 90+2'	Stadium: The Hawthorns; Attendance: 23,486; Referee: Mike Dean

11 December 2010 17	Newcastle United	3–1	Liverpool	Newcastle upon Tyne
17:30 GMT	Nolan 15'; Barton 80'; Carroll 90+1'	(Report)	Kuyt 49'	Stadium: St James' Park; Attendance: 50,137; Referee: Lee Mason

26 December 2010 18	Newcastle United	1–3	Manchester City	Newcastle upon Tyne
15:00 GMT	Carroll 72'	(Report)	Barry 2'; Tevez 5', 81'	Stadium: St James' Park; Attendance: 51,635; Referee: Chris Foy

28 December 2010 19	Tottenham Hotspur	2–0	Newcastle United	London
15:00 GMT	Lennon 57'; Bale 81'; Kaboul (red card) 65'	(Report)		Stadium: White Hart Lane; Attendance: 35,927; Referee: Anthony Taylor

2 January 2011 20	Wigan Athletic	0–1	Newcastle United	Wigan
16:00 GMT		(Report)	Ameobi 19'	Stadium: DW Stadium; Attendance: 15,277; Referee: Howard Webb

5 January 2011 21	Newcastle United	5–0	West Ham United	Newcastle upon Tyne
19:45 GMT	Best 18', 39', 60'; Nolan 45'; Løvenkrands 63'	(Report)		Stadium: St James' Park; Attendance: 42,387; Referee: Mike Dean

16 January 2011 22	Sunderland	1–1	Newcastle United	Sunderland
12:00 GMT	Gyan 90+4'	(Report)	Nolan 52'	Stadium: Stadium of Light; Attendance: 47,864; Referee: Howard Webb

22 January 2011 23	Newcastle United	1–1	Tottenham Hotspur	Newcastle upon Tyne
15:00 GMT	Coloccini 59'	(Report)	Lennon 90+1'	Stadium: St James' Park; Attendance: 51,010; Referee: Mark Halsey

2 February 2011 24	Fulham	1–0	Newcastle United	London
20:00 GMT	Duff 67'	(Report)		Stadium: Craven Cottage; Attendance: 25,620; Referee: Mike Jones

5 February 2011 25	Newcastle United	4–4	Arsenal	Newcastle upon Tyne
15:00 GMT	Barton 68' (pen.), 83' (pen.); Best 75'; Tioté 87'	(Report)	Walcott 1'; Djourou 3'; Van Persie 10', 26'; Diaby (red card) 50'	Stadium: St James' Park; Attendance: 51,561; Referee: Phil Dowd

12 February 2011 26	Blackburn Rovers	0–0	Newcastle United	Blackburn
15:00 GMT		(Report)		Stadium: Ewood Park; Attendance: 26,781; Referee: Stuart Attwell

15 February 2011 27	Birmingham City	0–2	Newcastle United	Birmingham
19:45 GMT		(Report)	Løvenkrands 2'; Best 50'	Stadium: St Andrew's; Attendance: 28,270; Referee: Lee Mason

26 February 2011 28	Newcastle United	1–1	Bolton Wanderers	Newcastle upon Tyne
15:00 GMT	Nolan 13'; R. Taylor (red card) 54'	(Report)	Sturridge 38'	Stadium: St James' Park; Attendance: 48,062; Referee: Chris Foy

5 March 2011 29	Newcastle United	1–2	Everton	Newcastle upon Tyne
15:00 GMT	Best 23'	(Report)	Osman 31'; Jagielka 36'	Stadium: St James' Park; Attendance: 50,128; Referee: Howard Webb

19 March 2011 30	Stoke City	4–0	Newcastle United	Stoke-on-Trent
15:00 GMT	Walters 28'; Pennant 46'; Higginbotham 49'; Fuller 90+2'	(Report)		Stadium: Britannia Stadium; Attendance: 27,505; Referee: Lee Mason

2 April 2011 31	Newcastle United	4–1	Wolverhampton Wanderers	Newcastle upon Tyne
15:00 BST	Nolan 22'; Ameobi 45'; Løvenkrands 50'; Gutiérrez 90+3'	(Report)	Ebanks-Blake 58'	Stadium: St James' Park; Attendance: 49,939; Referee: Mike Dean

10 April 2011 32	Aston Villa	1–0	Newcastle United	Birmingham
16:00 BST	Collins 24'	(Report)		Stadium: Villa Park; Attendance: 37,090; Referee: Stuart Attwell

19 April 2011 33	Newcastle United	0–0	Manchester United	Newcastle upon Tyne
19:45 BST		(Report)		Stadium: St James' Park; Attendance: 49,025; Referee: Lee Probert

23 April 2011 34	Blackpool	1–1	Newcastle United	Blackpool
15:00 BST	Campbell 32'	(Report)	Løvenkrands 17'	Stadium: Bloomfield Road; Attendance: 16,003; Referee: Martin Atkinson

1 May 2011 35	Liverpool	3–0	Newcastle United	Liverpool
12:00 BST	Rodríguez 10'; Kuyt 59' (pen.); Suárez 65'	(Report)		Stadium: Anfield; Attendance: 44,923; Referee: Peter Walton

7 May 2011 36	Newcastle United	2–1	Birmingham City	Newcastle upon Tyne
15:00 BST	Ameobi 36' (pen.); S. Taylor 43'	(Report)	Bowyer 45'; Ridgewell (red card) 36'	Stadium: St James' Park; Attendance: 47,409; Referee: Chris Foy

15 May 2011 37	Chelsea	2–2	Newcastle United	London
13:30 BST	Ivanović 2'; Alex 83'	(Report)	Gutiérrez 10'; S. Taylor 90+2'	Stadium: Stamford Bridge; Attendance: 41,739; Referee: Lee Mason

22 May 2011 38	Newcastle United	3–3	West Bromwich Albion	Newcastle upon Tyne
16:00 BST	S. Taylor 16'; Løvenkrands 39'; Olsson 47' (o.g.)	(Report)	Tchoyi 62', 71', 90'	Stadium: St James' Park; Attendance: 51,678; Referee: Mark Halsey

=== FA Cup ===
8 January 2011 Round 3	Stevenage	3–1	Newcastle United	Stevenage
17:30 GMT	Williamson 50' (o.g.); Bostwick 55'; Winn 90+3'	(Report)	Barton 90+2'; Tioté (red card) 71'	Stadium: Broadhall Way; Attendance: 6,644; Referee: Andre Marriner

=== League Cup ===
25 August 2010 Round 2	Accrington Stanley	2–3	Newcastle United	Accrington
19:45 BST	Putterill 45+1'; Hessey 90+4'	(Report)	R. Taylor 36'; Ameobi 48'; Løvenkrands 67'	Stadium: Crown Ground; Attendance: 4,098; Referee: Rob Shoebridge

22 September 2010 Round 3	Chelsea	3–4	Newcastle United	London
19:45 BST	Van Aanholt 6'; Anelka 70', 87' (pen.)	(Report)	Ranger 27'; R. Taylor 32'; Ameobi 49', 90'	Stadium: Stamford Bridge; Attendance: 41,511; Referee: Phil Dowd

27 October 2010 Round 4	Newcastle United	0–4	Arsenal	Newcastle upon Tyne
19:45 BST		(Report)	Krul 45+2' (o.g.); Walcott 53', 88'; Bendtner 83'	Stadium: St James' Park; Attendance: 33,157; Referee: Andre Marriner
