= Phil Airey =

English footballer (born 1991)

Personal information
- Full name: Philip Airey
- Date of birth: 14 November 1991 (age 34)
- Place of birth: Amble, England
- Height: 1.81 m (5 ft 11 1/2 in)
- Position: Striker

Youth career
- 2002–2011: Newcastle United

Senior career*
Years	Team	Apps	(Gls)
2011–2012	Newcastle United	0	(0)
2011	→ Hibernian (loan)	1	(0)
2012	→ Gateshead (loan)	2	(0)
2012–2013	Blyth Spartans	49	(6)
2013	→ Whitley Bay (loan)	8	(4)
Total		60	(10)
- * Club domestic league appearances and goals

Philip Airey (born 14 November 1991) is an English retired footballer who played as a striker. Airey has played for Premier League club Newcastle United, Scottish Premier League club Hibernian, Blyth Spartans and on loan at Whitley Bay.

== Club career ==
Airey joined the Newcastle United Academy at age 10 and made his reserve team debut on 18 November 2008 against Everton as a right back. Airey made his first team debut on 8 January 2011 as a second-half substitute in a 3–1 defeat against Stevenage in the FA Cup. He won the Golden Boot in the Premier Reserve League North with 11 goals. Airey signed on loan for Scottish Premier League club Hibernian in August 2011. He made just one substitute appearance before returning to Newcastle a month later. On 20 January 2012, Airey signed for Conference National side Gateshead on a one-month loan. He made his debut the following day as a 79th-minute substitute in Gateshead's 3–3 draw with Lincoln City. Airey was released by Newcastle United on 1 June 2012.

He then joined Blyth Spartans in August 2012. He started out at the club as a striker but moved to right-back to accommodate for the loss of Shaun Utterson. Airey had a number of trials at full-time clubs over the 2012–13 season, but failed to secure a deal. On 18 November 2013, Airey joined Northern League side Whitley Bay on a month loan, making a goal-scoring debut the following day in a 7–3 win against Alnwick Town in the Northumberland Senior Cup. Airey now plays for local club Red Row Welfare Fc.

== Career statistics ==
=== Club ===
As of 20:00, 24 January 2012 (UTC)

Club performance			League		Cup		League Cup		Continental		Total	
Season	Club	League	Apps	Goals	Apps	Goals	Apps	Goals	Apps	Goals	Apps	Goals
England			League		FA Cup		League Cup		Europe		Total	
2010–11	Newcastle United	Premier League	0	0	1	0	0	0	0	0	1	0
2011–12	Newcastle United	Premier League	0	0	0	0	0	0	0	0	0	0
2011–12	Hibernian (loan)	Scottish Premier League	1	0	0	0	0	0	0	0	1	0
2011–12	Gateshead (loan)	Conference National	2	0	0	0	0	0	0	0	2	0
Career total			3	0	1	0	0	0	0	0	4	0
