= Jonás Gutiérrez =

Argentine footballer

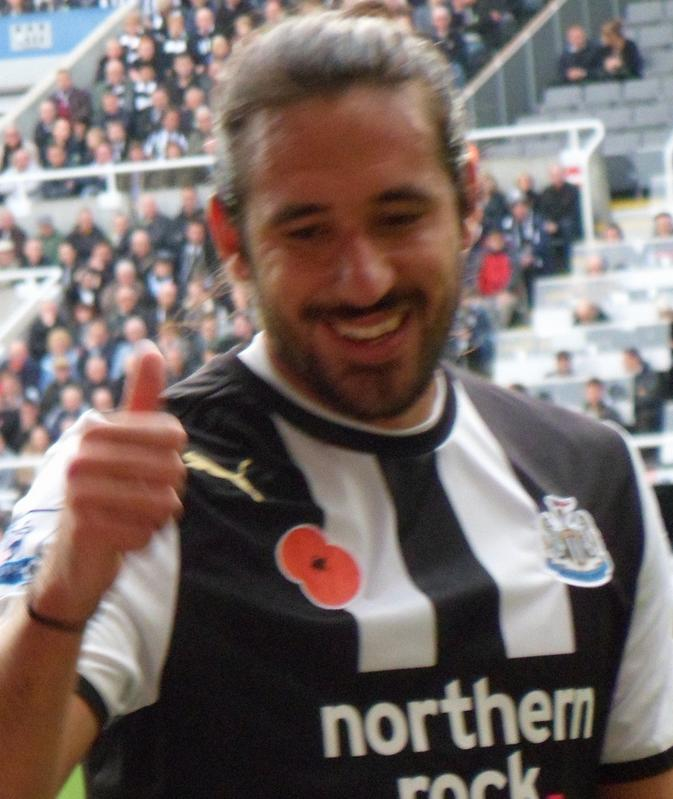
- Gutiérrez with Newcastle United in 2011

Personal information
- Full name: Jonás Manuel Gutiérrez
- Date of birth: 5 July 1983 (age 43)
- Place of birth: Sáenz Peña, Argentina
- Height: 1.84 m (6 ft 0 in)
- Position: Midfielder

Youth career
- 1999–2001: Vélez Sársfield

Senior career*
| Years | Team | Apps | (Gls) |
| 2001–2005 | Vélez Sársfield | 99 | (2) |
| 2005–2008 | Mallorca | 96 | (5) |
| 2008–2015 | Newcastle United | 187 | (11) |
| 2014 | → Norwich City (loan) | 4 | (0) |
| 2015–2016 | Deportivo La Coruña | 15 | (0) |
| 2016–2017 | Defensa y Justicia | 18 | (0) |
| 2017–2018 | Independiente | 20 | (0) |
| 2018–2019 | Defensa y Justicia | 2 | (0) |
| 2019–2021 | Banfield | 14 | (0) |
| 2021 | Almagro | 6 | (0) |
| Total | | 461 | (18) |

International career
| 2007–2011 | Argentina | 22 | (1) |
- * Club domestic league appearances and goals

Jonás Manuel Gutiérrez (pronounced [xoˈnas ɣuˈtjeres]; born 5 July 1983) is an Argentine former professional footballer who played as a midfielder. He acquired the nickname "Spider-Man" for his goal celebration of putting on a mask of the superhero. He also calls himself "El Galgo", which means "The Greyhound" in Spanish.

He began his career with Vélez Sarsfield, moving to Mallorca in 2005 after winning the Clausura. Three years later he joined Newcastle United, winning the Championship title in 2010 and scoring the goal in 2015 which kept them in the Premier League. His later time at the club was affected by testicular cancer, from which he made a full recovery. He scored 12 goals in 205 matches across all competitions for Newcastle before his release in 2015.

A full international between 2007 and 2011, Gutiérrez won 22 caps for Argentina, representing the nation at the 2010 World Cup. He was considered a key part of the national side by coach Diego Maradona, who stated that his team was "Mascherano, Messi, Jonás, and eight more".

== Club career ==
=== Vélez Sársfield ===
Born in Sáenz Peña, Buenos Aires, Gutiérrez played for Vélez Sársfield between 2001 and 2005. The highlight of his Vélez career was being part of the team that won the Primera División Clausura Tournament in 2005.

=== Mallorca ===
After winning the title in 2005 he signed with Spanish club Mallorca.

On 1 July 2008, Gutiérrez unilaterally rescinded his contract with the club after invoking FIFA Article 17 (commonly known as the Webster ruling). As a result, the club sought a €15 million compensation claim against the player and his new club, Newcastle United, at a tribunal.

=== Newcastle United ===
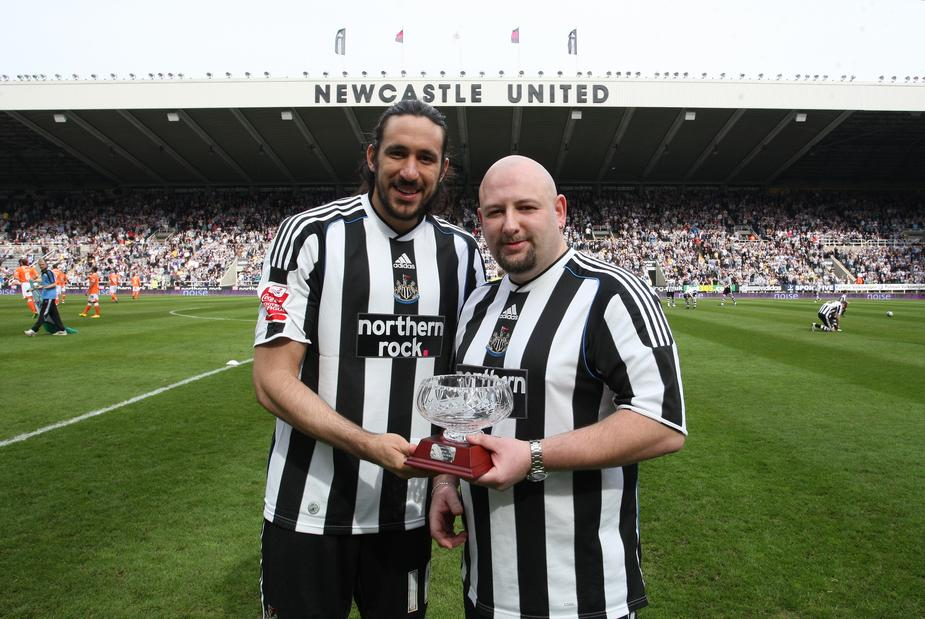
Gutiérrez receiving the Championship Player of the Month award in April 2010.

Gutiérrez signed for Newcastle United on a five-year contract for an undisclosed fee on 2 July 2008. Gutiérrez told the club's official website that instead of "Gutiérrez", the former Real Mallorca man would sport "Jonás" above his squad number 18 he said "Because I like my name."

Gutiérrez made his debut for Newcastle United on the opening day of the 2008–09 season on 17 August 2008. In the game, he impressed both fans and pundits as he helped his team to a 1–1 draw against title-holders Manchester United. Alan Hansen said on Match of the Day that Gutiérrez "was the most impressive Premier League debutant" on the opening day of the season.

Gutiérrez scored his first goal for Newcastle United in their pre-season friendly match against Darlington, which resulted in a 7–2 win for Newcastle. on 18 July 2009. Following the departure of left-sided winger Damien Duff, he switched from his usual right winger to left winger position, forming an effective left flank partnership with fellow Spanish-speaker José Enrique. His first competitive goal for Newcastle was against Peterborough United on 7 November 2009, taking on five players before scoring. He netted his second goal of the season in the 6–1 drubbing of Barnsley, smashing a right-footed shot into the net via the underside of the crossbar from 25 yards, and celebrating with his trademark Spider-Man mask. The next came at Bristol City, where he punished a defensive error to spark Newcastle's comeback from two goals down to draw 2–2. Following Newcastle's promotion to the Premier League, Gutiérrez stated that he would like to play at Newcastle for many more years. In 2010, World Footballer of the Year, Lionel Messi, lauded Gutiérrez as one of the finest players in the Premier League.

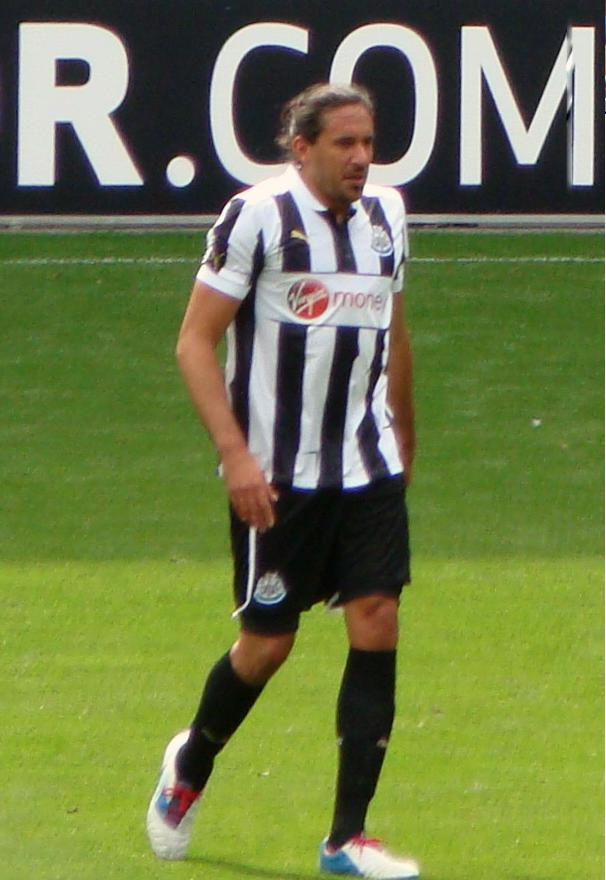
Jonás playing for Newcastle in 2012.

On Newcastle's return to the Premier League, he started the first four Premier League fixtures of his club in his accustomed left wing role. With the arrival of Hatem Ben Arfa to the club and the Frenchman's impressive displays, Gutiérrez was dropped to the bench for Newcastle's clashes with Everton and Stoke City. Gutiérrez scored his first goal of the 2010–11 campaign against Manchester City in a 2–1 defeat on 3 October 2010. On 3 April, he scored his second for Newcastle in the Premier League, a long-range shot in a 4–1 win over Wolverhampton Wanderers. He also scored the equaliser away at Chelsea on 15 May 2011 when a free kick from Ryan Taylor was deflected off his backside. Gutiérrez signed a new four-year contract at the club on 27 September 2011. He maintained his impressive form in the 2011–12 season, scoring a fine solo goal in the 2–1 away victory against Wolves. He received man of the match in the victory against Stoke City on 31 October. Gutiérrez was instrumental in Newcastle's start to the season. He contributed with a last-gasp goal in the 95th minute (injury time) to defeat Blackburn Rovers 2–1 in the third round of the FA Cup on 7 January 2012. He celebrated by donning the famous red Spider-Man mask, but was booked shortly afterwards. He went on to score his third goal of the season in the home tie against Wolves with a 30-yard strike in front of the Sir John Hall Stand at St James' Park; this goal made it three goals in his last three appearances against Wolves. The season also marked a transition for Gutiérrez into a central midfield role.

Newcastle's fifth-placed league finish in the previous season meant that the club qualified for the Europa League. Gutiérrez was mostly rested for the group stages but was more involved in the knockout rounds. He made six appearances as Newcastle exited the competition at the quarter-final stage. On 2 February 2013, Gutiérrez scored a header in a 3–2 home victory against Chelsea. A tumour was detected in his testicle at the end of the season and he underwent surgery in his native Argentina in October 2013.

==== Norwich City (loan) ====
Upon his return from surgery, Gutiérrez found his playing time limited at Newcastle. On 13 January 2014, he secured a loan move to fellow Premier League team Norwich City under the management of his former boss at Newcastle, Chris Hughton, for the rest of the season. He was limited to four appearances for the club following a calf injury and the sacking of Hughton.

==== Return to Newcastle United ====
On 28 February 2015, Gutiérrez made his first appearance in a Newcastle United squad since his recovery when he was named as an unused substitute for Newcastle's 1–0 home win against Aston Villa. He made his official return as a substitute on 4 March 2015 against Manchester United, and was passed the captains' armband by teammate Fabricio Coloccini on entering the field. On the final day of the season, Gutiérrez assisted the first and scored the second goal to ensure Newcastle stayed in the Premier League in a 2–0 win at home to West Ham United. He was let go at the end of the season, being made aware of this news by interim manager John Carver's phonecall to teammate Ryan Taylor, which caused him to "think they don't care about anything." Irrespective of his treatment by the club's management, Gutiérrez continued to maintain a strong relationship with Newcastle fans.

=== Later career ===
On 1 September 2015, Gutiérrez signed a one-year deal with Deportivo de La Coruña. He made seventeen appearances in all competitions, with five of them in the starting XI.

On 6 September 2016, Gutiérrez signed a one-year deal with Defensa y Justicia.

On 10 July 2017, Gutiérrez signed a two-year deal with Independiente.

On 13 July 2018, Gutiérrez re-signed with Defensa y Justicia.

On 16 November 2021, Gutiérrez announced his retirement from football.

== International career ==
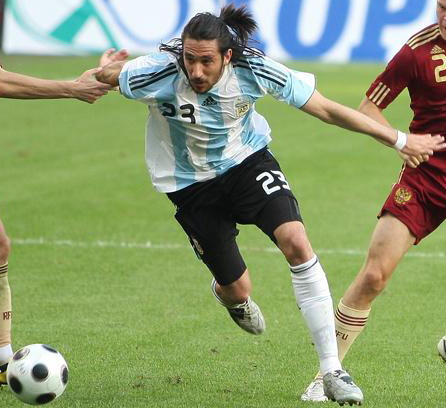
Jonás on international duty for Argentina in 2009.

Gutiérrez was part of the victorious Argentina national under-20 team at the 2003 South American Youth Championship.

Gutiérrez has earned 22 senior caps for Argentina. He made his debut against France in February 2007 and later on in the year, earned his second cap against Australia on 11 September. He earned his third cap on 18 June 2008, away to Brazil as part of the 2010 FIFA World Cup qualifiers, the match concluding in a 0–0 draw. He scored his first goal for Argentina in the first half of a friendly against France on 11 February 2009. However, due to the presence of other wingers such as Lionel Messi, Maxi Rodríguez and Ángel Di María, and the absence of Javier Zanetti in the squad for the 2010 FIFA World Cup, Gutiérrez often played at right back for his country.

== Personal life ==
On 16 September 2014, Gutiérrez revealed that he was being treated for testicular cancer and had one final session of chemotherapy left, followed by two months of recuperation. He had experienced pain in his testicles following a collision in a match against Arsenal on 19 May 2013. Following inflammation of the area in September and several misdiagnoses, he went for an ultrasound scan where a tumour was discovered; he chose to have surgery to remove his left testicle in his native Argentina in October 2013. He returned to Newcastle a month later but was deemed surplus to squad requirements and was loaned out to Norwich City in January 2014 for the rest of the season. After the season ended, he experienced liver pain and swelling of his lymph nodes following a holiday and was started on chemotherapy. Until his interview in September 2014, Gutiérrez chose to keep his treatment mostly private, and only a few close friends in Gabriel Heinze, Martín Demichelis, Ezequiel Lavezzi and Newcastle teammate Fabricio Coloccini knew of his condition.

When his friend Steve Harper heard about Jonás's testicular cancer diagnosis, he was inspired to raise awareness around the issue through the creation of the clothing brand OddBalls.

On 3 November 2014, Gutiérrez was discharged from hospital. Having completed his recovery, he made his return to the Newcastle United first team on 4 March 2015, coming on as a substitute in home match against Manchester United. After recovering, he had the lyrics "I am alive again, more alive than I have been in my whole entire life" from Eminem's "No Love" tattooed onto his arm. His appearance as a substitute on 13 April 2015, was greeted with a standing ovation by Liverpool and Newcastle fans.

On 14 April 2016, Gutiérrez won a disability discrimination lawsuit against Newcastle, on the basis that by not being selected for the team due to his diagnosis he was unable to get an appearances-related bonus. Other charges of unfavourable treatment and disability harassment were dropped.

== Career statistics ==
=== Club ===
As of 8 May 2017

Appearances and goals by club, season and competition
| Club | Season | League | | | National cup (Note: Includes Copa Argentina, Copa del Rey, FA Cup) | | League cup (Note: Includes Football League Cup) | | Continental | | Total | |
| Club | Season | Division | Apps | Goals | Apps | Goals | Apps | Goals | Apps | Goals | Apps | Goals |
|---|---|---|---|---|---|---|---|---|---|---|---|---|
| Vélez Sársfield | 2000–01 | Primera División | 0 | 0 | 0 | 0 | — | | — | | 0 | 0 |
| Vélez Sársfield | 2001–02 | Primera División | 17 | 1 | 0 | 0 | — | | — | | 17 | 1 |
| Vélez Sársfield | 2002–03 | Primera División | 22 | 1 | 0 | 0 | — | | — | | 22 | 1 |
| Vélez Sársfield | 2003–04 | Primera División | 27 | 0 | 0 | 0 | — | | 5 (Note: Appearances in Copa Libertadores) | 0 | 32 | 0 |
| Vélez Sársfield | 2004–05 | Primera División | 33 | 0 | 0 | 0 | — | | — | | 33 | 0 |
| Vélez Sársfield | Total | | 99 | 2 | | | — | | 5 | 0 | 104 | 2 |
| Mallorca | 2005–06 | La Liga | 30 | 2 | 0 | 0 | — | | — | | 30 | 2 |
| Mallorca | 2006–07 | La Liga | 36 | 3 | 2 | 0 | — | | — | | 38 | 3 |
| Mallorca | 2007–08 | La Liga | 30 | 0 | 6 | 0 | — | | — | | 36 | 0 |
| Mallorca | Total | | 96 | 5 | 8 | 0 | — | | — | | 104 | 5 |
| Newcastle United | 2008–09 | Premier League | 30 | 0 | 2 | 0 | 1 | 0 | — | | 33 | 0 |
| Newcastle United | 2009–10 | Championship | 37 | 4 | 3 | 0 | 1 | 0 | — | | 41 | 4 |
| Newcastle United | 2010–11 | Premier League | 37 | 3 | 0 | 0 | 2 | 0 | — | | 39 | 3 |
| Newcastle United | 2011–12 | Premier League | 37 | 2 | 2 | 1 | 1 | 0 | — | | 40 | 3 |
| Newcastle United | 2012–13 | Premier League | 34 | 1 | 0 | 0 | 0 | 0 | 6 (Note: Appearances in UEFA Europa League) | 0 | 40 | 1 |
| Newcastle United | 2013–14 | Premier League | 2 | 0 | 0 | 0 | 0 | 0 | — | | 2 | 0 |
| Newcastle United | 2014–15 | Premier League | 10 | 1 | 0 | 0 | 0 | 0 | — | | 10 | 1 |
| Newcastle United | Total | | 187 | 11 | 7 | 1 | 5 | 0 | 6 | 0 | 205 | 12 |
| Norwich City (loan) | 2013–14 | Premier League | 4 | 0 | 0 | 0 | 0 | 0 | — | | 4 | 0 |
| Deportivo La Coruña | 2015–16 | La Liga | 15 | 0 | 2 | 0 | — | | — | | 17 | 0 |
| Defensa y Justicia | 2016–17 | Primera División | 18 | 0 | 1 | 0 | — | | — | | 19 | 0 |
| Career total | | | 419 | 18 | 18 | 1 | 5 | 0 | 11 | 0 | 454 | 19 |

=== International ===
Scores and results list Argentina's goal tally first, score column indicates score after Gutiérrez goal.

International goal scored by Jonás Gutiérrez
| No. | Date | Venue | Opponent | Score | Result | Competition | Ref. |
|---|---|---|---|---|---|---|---|
| 1 | 11 February 2009 | Stade Vélodrome, Marseille, France | France | 1–0 | 2–0 | Friendly | |

== Honours ==
Vélez Sársfield

- Argentine Primera División: Clausura 2005

Newcastle United

- Football League Championship: 2009–10

Independiente

- Copa Sudamericana: 2017

Argentina U20

- South American Youth Championship: 2003
