= Ryan Taylor (footballer, born 1984) =

English footballer

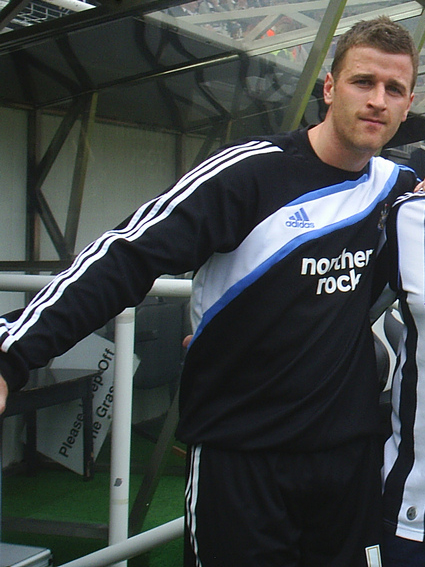
- Taylor with Newcastle United in 2010

Personal information
- Full name: Ryan Anthony Taylor
- Date of birth: 19 August 1984 (age 42)
- Place of birth: Liverpool, England
- Height: 5 ft 8 in (1.73 m)
- Positions: Full back; midfielder

Youth career
- Tranmere Rovers

Senior career*
Years	Team	Apps	(Gls)
2002–2005	Tranmere Rovers	98	(14)
2005–2009	Wigan Athletic	56	(6)
2009–2015	Newcastle United	92	(6)
2015–2016	Hull City	4	(0)
2016–2017	Port Vale	12	(3)
2017	Port Vale	10	(1)
2017–2018	ATK	11	(1)
2018–2019	Fleetwood Town	10	(0)
2020–2022	Colne	20	(0)
2022	Buxton	6	(0)
Total		319	(31)

International career
2005–2006	England U21	5	(0)
- * Club domestic league appearances and goals

Ryan Anthony Taylor (born 19 August 1984) is an English former professional footballer who is now an academy coach at EFL Championship club Preston North End. A versatile player and former England under-21 international, he could play as a full-back or across the midfield and had excellent free-kick-taking ability.

Taylor began his career at Tranmere Rovers in 2002 and made 122 league and cup appearances in three full seasons with the club, being voted as Tranmere's Player of the Year and onto the PFA Team of the Year in 2004–05. He was sold to Premier League club Wigan Athletic in July 2005 for a fee of £750,000. Injuries restricted his appearances, though after scoring in four consecutive matches against Newcastle United, he joined the club in a trade deal in January 2009. After Newcastle dropped out of the top flight, Taylor helped the club to win promotion as champions of the Championship in 2009–10. However, he then faced a catalogue of injuries, firstly fracturing a metatarsal and then breaking a leg in the 2010–11 season, and then picking up a serious cruciate knee ligament injury in August 2012.

Taylor played 106 matches for Newcastle, though he featured 18 times in his final three seasons. Newcastle released him in May 2015 and spent the 2015–16 campaign at Hull City, where he made only occasional cameo appearances. He signed with Port Vale in October 2016 and again in March 2017. He signed with Indian Super League club ATK in December 2017. He returned to England and signed with Fleetwood Town in September 2018. He ended his 17-year career in the English Football League at the end of the season, scoring 42 goals in 350 competitive appearances. He came out of retirement in October 2020 to play for non-League side Colne and moved on to Buxton in January 2022.

== Club career ==
=== Tranmere Rovers ===
Born in Liverpool, Merseyside, Taylor came through the Tranmere Rovers youth team to score the winning goal on his first-team debut in a 2–1 win over Hartlepool United in a League Cup tie at Victoria Park on 10 September 2002. He made his league debut in a 3–1 win over Brentford four days later at Prenton Park. On 19 September, Rovers confirmed that Taylor had signed a new long-term deal to keep him tied to the club until June 2006. He maintained a regular place in the starting eleven under both Ray Mathias and Brian Little. He ended the 2002–03 campaign with three goals in 32 appearances, before scoring six goals over 39 matches in the 2003–04 season. He spent most of his time as a right-back, after succeeding veteran defender Steve Yates.

He scored 10 goals in 51 appearances in the 2004–05 season, including one in the League One play-off semi-final second leg victory over Hartlepool United; the tie went to penalties, however, and Taylor missed one of the penalties as Tranmere were beaten 6–5. He was voted onto the League One PFA Team of the Year for his performances across the season. He was also voted as Tranmere Rovers Player of the Year by both his teammates and the supporters. In July 2005, he was sold to Wigan Athletic for £750,000 (potentially rising to £1.3 million with appearance clauses); and signed a four-year contract. The transfer ended weeks of speculation, that had seemed him linked with Norwich City, Arsenal, and Everton; Norwich manager Nigel Worthington had stated that "he's gone to Everton".

=== Wigan Athletic ===
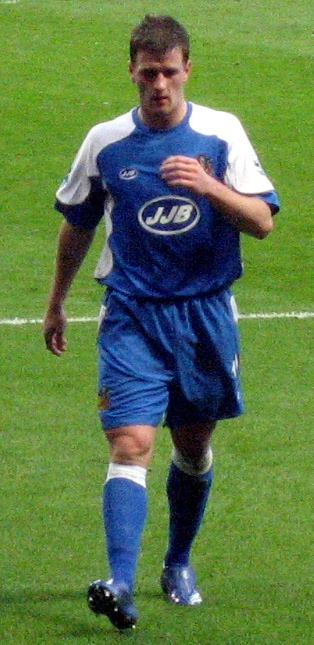
Taylor playing for Wigan Athletic in 2007

Taylor scored his first goal for Paul Jewell's Wigan with a penalty in a 3–0 home victory over Watford in the League Cup on 25 October 2005. However, he fractured his fifth metatarsal in a 1–1 FA Cup third round draw with Leeds United on 7 January, which ruled him out of action for three months. He ended up spending the remainder of the 2005–06 season out injured after breaking his leg in a reserve team match against Newcastle United reserves in April. He scored his first top-flight goal with a well placed free kick in a 1–0 home win over Newcastle United on 25 February 2007. He scored one goal in 16 appearances in each of the 2005–06 and 2006–07 seasons.

Frozen out of the first-team picture under new manager Chris Hutchings, Taylor was restored to the first-team after Steve Bruce replaced Hutchings as manager in November 2007. When Newcastle returned to the JJB Stadium on Boxing Day, Taylor repeated his feat of the same tie in the previous season, again beating Shay Given with a free kick to score the only goal of the match. On 5 April, he doubled his Premier League goal tally with two close-range efforts to give Wigan an important 2–0 home win over relegation rivals Birmingham City. He continued his run of goals over Newcastle into the 2008–09 season, scoring in both the home and away fixtures, to help Wigan to secure an away draw and home victory. In February 2009, Taylor was traded to Newcastle in a part-exchange for Charles N'Zogbia, and signed a four-and-a-half-year contract with Newcastle.

=== Newcastle United ===
Newcastle manager Joe Kinnear said that he was "over the moon" to sign Taylor, noting that his versatility and experience would make him a useful addition. Taylor said that Newcastle were in a relegation fight, and said "we have to get on and battle". Taylor played ten matches in the remainder of the 2008–09 season as Newcastle finished one point short of safety. He scored his first goal for the club on 22 August to help secure a 2–0 victory over Crystal Palace at Selhurst Park. He went on to score four goals in 36 appearances – mostly as a substitute – in the 2009–10 season as Newcastle won promotion as champions of the Championship.

Taylor lost his first-team place under Chris Hughton's stewardship at the start of the 2010–11 season, though claimed two long-range goals in the League Cup in victories over Accrington Stanley and Chelsea. After a lengthy spell on the sidelines due to an ankle ligament injury picked up in training after colliding with Sol Campbell, Taylor returned to first-team action against Bolton Wanderers on 26 February, and was sent off after a two-footed challenge on Johan Elmander. He ended the 2010–11 season with just five league appearances to his name.

On 20 August 2011, he scored from a free kick in a 1–0 victory over Sunderland in the Tyne–Wear derby at the Stadium of Light. Manager Alan Pardew praised Taylor after the match, saying that "that right foot of his is a fantastic weapon". Taylor then scored a late equaliser from another free kick in the 2–1 away win against Scunthorpe United in the second round of the League Cup five days later. He scored the winning goal, a dipping volley from outside the penalty area, against Everton on 5 November; this strike won him Match of the Day's Goal of the Month competition. He signed a two-year contract extension in March 2012, to keep him at St James' Park until 2015. He remained a regular first-team player for the remainder of the 2011–12 season, playing 34 times.

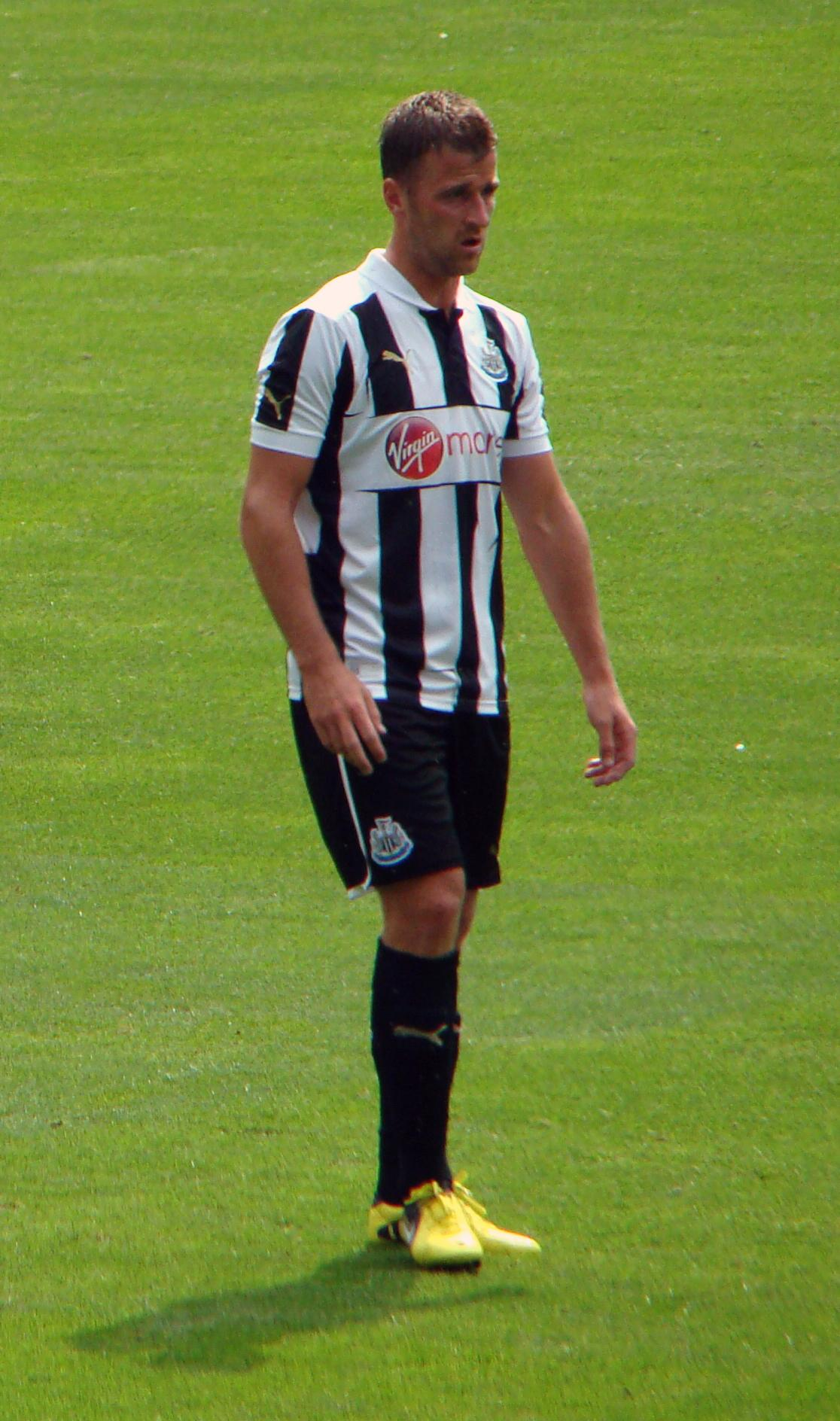
Taylor playing for Newcastle United in 2012

On 23 August 2012, Taylor scored from a free kick in a Europa League match against Greek team Atromitos. However, he picked up a cruciate knee ligament injury in the return leg seven days later. In April 2013, a repeat of the problem meant that he would be forced to endure another lengthy spell on the sidelines. He flew out to the United States the following month in order to be operated upon by renowned specialist Dr Richard Steadman. Steadman recommended he undergo two bouts of surgery six months apart. During his time out of action he assisted Peter Beardsley with coaching the under-21 team.

Taylor made his long-awaited return to the first-team after 26 months out, starring in the 2–0 League Cup win at Manchester City on 29 October 2014. He described his comeback as "a dream come true" and paid tribute to the staff and fans who helped him during his spell out. On 22 November, however, he left the field in tears after injuring his right knee again in a league match against Queens Park Rangers. Taylor returned to the pitch in February 2015, and after Newcastle avoided relegation, he and Jonás Gutiérrez were released in May. Taylor revealed that Newcastle manager "John Carver rang me and told me the club weren't going to offer me a new deal, then he asked me to pass the phone to Jonas, which was unbelievable."

=== Hull City ===
In July 2015, Taylor signed a one-year contract with newly relegated Championship club Hull City, coached by Steve Bruce, his former manager at Wigan. He made his debut on the opening day of the 2015–16 season, in a 2–0 home win over Huddersfield Town. However, this would prove to be his only league start in his time at the club, though he would also make three substitute league appearances and play in eight cup fixtures. Hull released him in June 2016.

=== Port Vale ===
Taylor had a trial with Rotherham United and former club Wigan Athletic in July 2016, and went on to train with Preston North End. On 21 October 2016, he signed a short-term deal with League One club Port Vale. He made his debut the following day, and scored from the penalty spot to secure Vale a point in a 2–2 draw with Oxford United at Vale Park. Manager Bruno Ribeiro preferred to play him at right-back, and Taylor was named in the League One 'Team of the Day' after making a goal saving interception in a 2–1 victory over Fleetwood Town on 12 November. With Taylor's contract due to run out in January, caretaker manager Michael Brown stated that he was hopeful of keeping Taylor at the club, and that the pair were good friends, but that foreign and higher-level clubs had expressed an interest.

Taylor had a trial with Major League Soccer's Chicago Fire but did not settle in the United States and returned to England. He returned to Port Vale to sign another short-term contract on 17 March, and later that evening provided an assist and scored a goal in a crucial 2–1 home win against relegation rivals Shrewsbury Town.

=== ATK ===
On 12 December 2017, Taylor joined reigning Indian Super League champions ATK as a replacement for the injured Carl Baker. He said that Iain Hume convinced him to join the league and spoke "very highly of everyone in ATK". He made his debut for the club five days later in a match against Mumbai City FC, playing the whole ninety minutes of the 1–0 victory. On 8 February 2018, he scored his first goal in a 2–2 draw against FC Pune City.

=== Fleetwood Town ===
On 23 September 2018, Taylor returned to England and joined League One club Fleetwood Town as a free agent following a successful trial. Fleetwood manager, Joey Barton, stated that; "the hunger and desire that Ryan has shown to be part of our group at Fleetwood is exceptional, and we're delighted to have him on board with us". He featured 11 times during the 2018–19 campaign before he departed Highbury Stadium after being released in May 2019.

=== Later career ===
On 27 October 2020, Taylor joined Northern Premier League Division One North West club Colne. The 2020–21 season was curtailed after just nine games for Colne. He played in goal for the club after goalkeeper Joel Torrance was sent off five minutes before half-time in an FA Trophy victory over Buxton in November 2021. He joined Northern Premier League Premier Division club Buxton in January 2022.

== International career ==
Taylor made his debut for the England under-21 team in a 2–1 defeat to Austria in a 2006 UEFA European Under-21 Championship qualification match at Elland Road on 7 October 2005. He then played in a 4–1 victory over Poland four days later at Hillsborough. He then featured in both legs of England U21s qualification play-off defeat to France, before making his final appearance for the under-21s in a 3–1 friendly win over Norway on 28 February 2006.

== Coaching career ==
Taylor was appointed as a Lead Development Phase Coach at Preston North End in September 2025.

== Style of play ==
Taylor was a versatile player, operating as a full-back or across the midfield. He was also a dead ball specialist, able to take free kicks, long throws, and penalties effectively. Newcastle fans nicknamed him "over-the-wall", in reference to his free kick taking abilities.

== Career statistics ==
Appearances and goals by club, season and competition
Club	Season	League			FA Cup		League Cup		Other		Total	
Club	Season	Division	Apps	Goals	Apps	Goals	Apps	Goals	Apps	Goals	Apps	Goals
Tranmere Rovers	2002–03	Second Division	25	1	2	0	2	1	3 (Note: Appearances in Football League Trophy)	1	32	3
Tranmere Rovers	2003–04	Second Division	30	5	7	1	2	0	0	0	39	6
Tranmere Rovers	2004–05	League One	43	8	1	1	2	0	5 (Note: Three appearances in Football League Trophy, two appearances and one goal in League One play-offs)	1	51	10
Tranmere Rovers	Total		98	14	10	2	6	1	8	2	122	19
Wigan Athletic	2005–06	Premier League	11	0	1	0	4	1	—		16	1
Wigan Athletic	2006–07	Premier League	16	1	0	0	0	0	—		16	1
Wigan Athletic	2007–08	Premier League	17	3	2	0	0	0	—		19	3
Wigan Athletic	2008–09	Premier League	12	2	0	0	0	0	—		12	2
Wigan Athletic	Total		56	6	3	0	4	1	—		63	7
Newcastle United	2008–09	Premier League	10	0	—		—		—		10	0
Newcastle United	2009–10	Championship	31	4	3	0	2	0	—		36	4
Newcastle United	2010–11	Premier League	5	0	0	0	3	2	—		8	2
Newcastle United	2011–12	Premier League	31	2	2	0	1	1	—		34	3
Newcastle United	2012–13	Premier League	1	0	0	0	0	0	2 (Note: Appearances in UEFA Europa League)	1	3	1
Newcastle United	2013–14	Premier League	0	0	0	0	0	0	—		0	0
Newcastle United	2014–15	Premier League	14	0	0	0	1	0	—		15	0
Newcastle United	Total		92	6	5	0	7	3	2	1	106	10
Hull City	2015–16	Championship	4	0	4	0	4	0	0	0	12	0
Port Vale	2016–17	League One	22	4	3	1	—		0	0	25	5
ATK	2017–18	Indian Super League	11	1	—		—		—		11	1
Fleetwood Town	2018–19	League One	10	0	0	0	—		1 (Note: Appearance in EFL Trophy)	0	11	0
Colne	2020–21	Northern Premier League; Division One North West	3	0	0	0	—		1 (Note: Appearance in FA Trophy)	0	4	0
Colne	2021–22	Northern Premier League; Division One North West	17	0	3	0	—		3	1	23	1
Colne	Total		20	0	3	0	0	0	4	1	27	1
Buxton	2021–22	Northern Premier League; Premier Division	6	0	0	0	—		0	0	6	0
Career total			319	31	28	3	21	5	15	4	383	43

== Honours ==
Newcastle United

- Football League Championship: 2009–10

Individual

- PFA Team of the Year: 2004–05 League One
- Tranmere Rovers Player of the Year: 2004–05
