= Matthew Grieve =

English footballer (born 1990)

Personal information
- Full name: Matthew Andrias Grieve
- Date of birth: 8 November 1990 (age 35)
- Place of birth: Ashington, England
- Position: Defender

Team information
- Current team: Whickham

Youth career
- ?–2009: Newcastle United

Senior career*
Years	Team	Apps	(Gls)
2009–2011	Newcastle United	0	(0)
2011	→ Stockport County (loan)	3	(0)
2011–2012	Ashington	31	(2)
2012	Darlington 1883	0	(0)
2012–2013	Ashington	59	(8)
2013	Celtic Nation	11	(1)
- * Club domestic league appearances and goals as of 22 January 2011

Matthew Andrias Grieve (born 8 November 1990) is an English footballer who plays as a defender for Whickham.

== Club career ==
=== Newcastle United ===
He joined the Newcastle United Academy in July 2007, having completing his education and having already played for the club at all levels between Under 14 and Under 18. He played for the Under 18 team at the age of 15, and was named in the reserves at the end of the 2006–07 season. He made his reserve team debut against Wigan on 8 October 2007. He was released on a free transfer at the end of the 2011 season.

=== Stockport County ===
On 7 January 2011 he joined Stockport County on loan for a month, and was given the number 26 shirt. He made his Football League debut the following day in a 5–1 home defeat to Gillingham. Three days later, in his second match for the club, he scored an own goal in a match against Rotherham United. He returned to his parent club having sustained a facial injury.

=== Non-League football ===
Following his release from Newcastle United Grieve signed for hometown club Ashington, signed for Darlington 1883, and then returned to Ashington. He then moved to Celtic Nation F.C in September 2013 and later played for Whickham in The Ebac Northern League 1st division.

== Career statistics ==
As of 22 January 2011

Appearances and goals by club, season and competition
Club	Season	League		FA Cup		League Cup		Continental		Other		Total	
Club	Season	Apps	Goals	Apps	Goals	Apps	Goals	Apps	Goals	Apps	Goals	Apps	Goals
Stockport County (loan)	2010–11	3	0	0	0	0	0	–		0	0	3	0
Career total		3	0	0	0	0	0	0	0	0	0	3	0
