= 2005–06 Wigan Athletic F.C. season =

Wigan Athletic
2005–06 season
- Chairman: Dave Whelan
- Manager: Paul Jewell
- Premier League: 10th
- FA Cup: Fourth round
- League Cup: Runners-up
- Top goalscorer: League: Henri Camara (12); All: Jason Roberts (14)
- Highest home attendance: 25,023 (vs. Liverpool, Premier League, 11 February)
- Lowest home attendance: 3,346 (vs. AFC Bournemouth, League Cup, 20 September)
| Home colours | Away colours |

The 2005–06 Wigan Athletic season was the club's 28th season in the Football League and their first ever season in the top division of English football, following their promotion from the Championship the season before.

Despite starting the season as one of the favourites for relegation, Wigan managed to exceed expectations with a nine-match unbeaten run early in the season, occupying second place behind runaway leaders Chelsea at one stage. The club eventually finished the season in tenth place.

Wigan also reached the final of the League Cup, the club's first ever appearance in a major cup final. They lost the match 4–0 to Manchester United.

== Background ==
Prior to the club's promotion to the Premier League, Wigan were a team that had spent 25 years in the third and fourth tier of English football since the club's election into the Football League in 1978. In 1995, when the club was playing football in Division Three and struggling due to financial difficulties and declining attendances, Wigan was taken over by local businessman Dave Whelan, who ambitiously proclaimed that Wigan would be playing Premier League football within ten years. He also built a new stadium for the club, the JJB Stadium, which was opened in 1999 and replaced the dilapidated Springfield Park ground which had been inherited from the town's previous league club, Wigan Borough, on its formation in 1932.

With the help of Whelan's financial backing, the club rapidly rose through the divisions, gaining promotion to the second tier of English football for the first time in 2003, and culminating with their promotion to the Premier League on the final day of the 2004–05 Championship season. Despite this success, the club was predicted by many to be relegated straight back down to the Championship, including The Times, who suggested Wigan "will need a miracle if they are to survive".

== Pre-season ==
On 7 July, Greater Manchester Police issued the club with a court summons over an unpaid bill of approximately £270,000 for policing the club's football matches. The police had also threatened to withdraw their services if the club failed to settle the debt before 1 August. Chairman Dave Whelan later agreed to pay the bill to prevent the cancellation of fixtures in the club's first Premier League season, but would continue to resolve the matter in court.

The squad began their pre-season preparations with a training camp in Denmark. They played two friendlies against local opposition behind closed doors, and won both games 5–0. Midfielder Jimmy Bullard also agreed a new three-year contract with the club, ending speculation that he would leave before the end of the transfer window.

| Date | Opponent | Result | Venue | Scorers | Attendance | Match Report |
|---|---|---|---|---|---|---|
| 19 July 2005 | Elite 3000 Helsingør | 0–5 | Away | Mahon 45', Thome 47', Teale 57', Bullard 70', Teale 82' | 330 | Report |
| 21 July 2005 | Herlev IF | 0–5 | Away | ? | 621 | |
| 27 July 2005 | Preston North End | 1–1 | Away | McCulloch 9' | 3,124 | |
| 30 July 2005 | Macclesfield Town | 0–4 | Away | Johansson 39', Bullard 57', Teale 81', Mahon 87' | 1,024 | |
| 2 August 2005 | Morecambe | 0–1 | Away | Ellington 77' | 1,262 | |
| 3 August 2005 | Accrington Stanley | 1–1 | Away | McCulloch 74' | 983 | |
| 6 August 2005 | Boavista | 1–0 | Home | Ellington 21' (pen) | 5,837 | |

== Premier League ==
=== August ===
Wigan's opening league game was at home against reigning Premier League champions Chelsea. The home side played well and despite missing opportunities to score themselves, it looked as though they would manage an impressive draw, but were denied by a spectacular injury time winner from Hernán Crespo. After losing 1–0 to Charlton Athletic on 20 August, Wigan's next game was a crucial home match against relegation rivals Sunderland. Wigan won the match 1–0, their first ever Premier League win, with Jason Roberts scoring the goal – a penalty which had been awarded within the first 15 seconds of the game.

=== September ===
On 10 September, Wigan came from behind to beat West Bromwich Albion 2–1, claiming their first Premier League win away from home, and scoring their first Premier League goals from open play. Following a draw in the next game against Middlesbrough, Wigan played their first cup game of the season against AFC Bournemouth in the League Cup, winning the match 1–0. On 24 September, Wigan extended their unbeaten run with a 1–0 away against Everton. As a result of the club's impressive form, manager Paul Jewell received the September Manager of the Month award.

| Date | Opponent | Result | Venue | Scorers | Attendance | Match Report |
|---|---|---|---|---|---|---|
| 14 August 2005 | Chelsea | 0–1 | Home | | 23,575 | Report |
| 20 August 2005 | Charlton Athletic | 1–0 | Away | | 23,453 | Report |
| 27 August 2005 | Sunderland | 1–0 | Home | Roberts 2' (pen) | 17,223 | Report |
| 10 September 2005 | West Bromwich Albion | 1–2 | Away | Connolly 40', Bullard 90+2' | 25,617 | Report |
| 18 September 2005 | Middlesbrough | 1–1 | Home | Camara 68' | 16,641 | Report |
| 24 September 2005 | Everton | 0–1 | Away | Francis 47' | 37,189 | Report |
| 2 October 2005 | Bolton Wanderers | 2–1 | Home | Camara 48', McCulloch 63' | 20,553 | Report |
| 15 October 2005 | Newcastle United | 1–0 | Home | Roberts 40' | 22,374 | Report |
| 22 October 2005 | Aston Villa | 0–2 | Away | Hughes 32' (og), Mahon 82' | 32,294 | Report |
| 29 October 2005 | Fulham | 1–0 | Home | Chimbonda 90+2' | 17,266 | Report |
| 5 November 2005 | Portsmouth | 0–2 | Away | Chimbonda 48', Roberts 79' | 19,102 | Report |
| 19 November 2005 | Arsenal | 2–3 | Home | Camara 28', Bullard 45' | 25,004 | Report |
| 26 November 2005 | Tottenham Hotspur | 1–2 | Home | McCulloch 88' | 22,611 | Report |
| 3 December 2005 | Liverpool | 3–0 | Away | | 44,098 | Report |
| 10 December 2005 | Chelsea | 1–0 | Away | | 42,060 | Report |
| 14 December 2005 | Manchester United | 4–0 | Away | | 67,793 | Report |
| 17 December 2005 | Charlton Athletic | 3–0 | Home | Camara 9', 51', 63' | 17,074 | Report |
| 26 December 2005 | Manchester City | 4–3 | Home | Roberts 11', 45', McCulloch 23', Camara 71' | 25,017 | Report |
| 28 December 2005 | West Ham United | 0–2 | Away | Roberts 43', Camara 45' | 34,131 | Report |
| 31 December 2005 | Blackburn Rovers | 0–3 | Home | | 20,639 | Report |
| 2 January 2006 | Birmingham City | 2–0 | Away | | 29,189 | Report |
| 15 January 2006 | West Bromwich Albion | 0–1 | Home | | 17,421 | Report |
| 21 January 2006 | Middlesbrough | 2–3 | Away | Roberts 2', Thompson 29', Mellor 90+3' | 27,208 | Report |
| 31 January 2006 | Everton | 1–1 | Home | Scharner 45' | 21,731 | Report |
| 4 February 2006 | Bolton Wanderers | 1–1 | Away | Johansson 77' | 25,854 | Report |
| 11 February 2006 | Liverpool | 0–1 | Home | | 25,023 | Report |
| 19 February 2006 | Tottenham Hotspur | 2–2 | Away | Johansson 10', 67' | 35,676 | Report |
| 6 March 2006 | Manchester United | 1–2 | Home | Scharner 60' | 23,574 | Report |
| 11 March 2006 | Sunderland | 0–1 | Away | Camara 8' | 31,194 | Report |
| 18 March 2006 | Manchester City | 0–1 | Away | McCulloch 55' | 42,444 | Report |
| 25 March 2006 | West Ham United | 1–2 | Home | McCulloch 45+1' | 18,736 | Report |
| 3 April 2006 | Blackburn Rovers | 1–1 | Away | Roberts 53' | 20,410 | Report |
| 8 April 2006 | Birmingham City | 1–1 | Home | Johansson 49' | 18,669 | Report |
| 15 April 2006 | Newcastle United | 3–1 | Away | Bullard 5' | 52,302 | Report |
| 18 April 2006 | Aston Villa | 3–2 | Home | Bullard 25', Camara 56', 60' | 17,330 | Report |
| 24 April 2006 | Fulham | 1–0 | Away | | 17,149 | Report |
| 29 April 2006 | Portsmouth | 1–2 | Home | Camara 34' | 21,126 | Report |
| 7 May 2006 | Arsenal | 4–2 | Away | Scharner 10', Thompson 33' | 38,359 | Report |

| Matchday | 1 | 2 | 3 | 4 | 5 | 6 | 7 | 8 | 9 | 10 | 11 | 12 | 13 | 14 | 15 | 16 | 17 | 18 | 19 | 20 | 21 | 22 | 23 | 24 | 25 | 26 | 27 | 28 | 29 | 30 | 31 | 32 | 33 | 34 | 35 | 36 | 37 | 38 |
|---|---|---|---|---|---|---|---|---|---|---|---|---|---|---|---|---|---|---|---|---|---|---|---|---|---|---|---|---|---|---|---|---|---|---|---|---|---|---|
| Ground | H | A | H | A | H | A | H | H | A | H | A | H | H | A | A | A | H | H | A | H | A | H | A | H | A | H | A | H | A | A | H | A | H | A | H | A | H | A |
| Result | L | L | W | W | D | W | W | W | W | W | W | L | L | L | L | L | W | W | W | L | L | L | W | D | D | L | D | L | W | W | L | D | D | L | W | L | L | L |
| Position | 15 | 18 | 17 | 11 | 10 | 9 | 9 | 6 | 5 | 2 | 2 | 3 | 5 | 8 | 9 | 9 | 6 | 6 | 5 | 5 | 6 | 7 | 7 | 6 | 7 | 9 | 9 | 10 | 8 | 8 | 8 | 8 | 8 | 10 | 8 | 9 | 10 | 10 |

Source: WorldFootball.com
A = Away; H = Home; W = Win; D = Draw; L = Loss

== FA Cup ==
| Date | Round | Opponent | Result | Venue | Scorers | Attendance | Match Report |
|---|---|---|---|---|---|---|---|
| 7 January 2006 | Third round | Leeds United | 1–1 | Home | Connolly 47' | 10,980 | [ Report] |
| 17 January 2006 | Third round (replay) | Leeds United | 3–3 (aet) | Away | Johansson 24', Roberts 50', 103' | 15,243 | [ Report] |
(Wigan Athletic win 4–2 on penalties)
| 28 January 2006 | Fourth round | Manchester City | 1–0 | Away | | 30,811 | [ Report] |

== League Cup ==
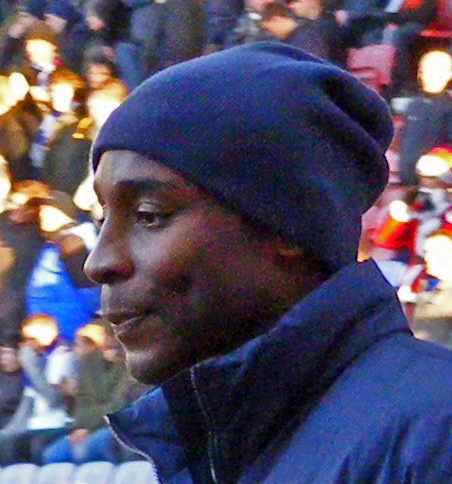
Jason Roberts scored a late goal against Arsenal to take Wigan to their first ever major cup final.

Wigan entered the League Cup in the second round and were drawn against AFC Bournemouth. Manager Paul Jewell made 11 changes to the side, with several players making their debuts. Bournemouth, suffering from an injury crisis, could only name four substitutes, but held Wigan until Jason Roberts broke the deadlock four minutes from time to send his team into the next round. Wigan played Watford in the third round, and the game was taken to extra time with neither side able to score after 90 minutes. Ryan Taylor scored the opening goal from the penalty spot in the 98th minute before Andreas Johansson sealed the victory with two goals late in the second half of extra time. In the fourth round, Wigan were drawn at home against Newcastle United, but despite being drawn against stronger opposition, Jewell reiterated that he would continue to use his fringe players in the cup, as Premier League survival was still the main priority for the club. Wigan beat their opponents 1–0 through a penalty from David Connolly late in the game, with Newcastle manager Graeme Souness conceding that Wigan were "totally dominant". The club then met local rivals Bolton Wanderers in the quarter-final, where Roberts' two goals late in the first half were enough to take Wigan to their first ever major cup semi-final.

Wigan's next opponents were Arsenal, with the first match of the two-legged tie to be played at the JJB Stadium. Wigan won the match 1–0 against a weakened Arsenal side, with debutant Paul Scharner scoring the goal. The attendance of 12,181, the lowest figure for a League Cup semi-final for almost ten years, was criticised by several media outlets, but club officials argued that the poor attendance was caused by a busy fixture list – the match was Wigan's fifth home game in the space of three weeks. Arsenal fielded their "strongest available line-up" for the return leg at Highbury, but struggled to beat Wigan goalkeeper Mike Pollitt, who made "a string of outstanding saves", including a first-half penalty against José Antonio Reyes. Arsenal made their first breakthrough around the halfway point of the second half, with Thierry Henry scoring the goal to tie the game on aggregate. The game went into extra time, and Arsenal took a 2–1 aggregate lead through a Robin van Persie free kick, before Wigan's Jason Roberts scored in the final two minutes to clinch a place in the cup final on the away goal rule.

The final was played at the Millennium Stadium against Manchester United, with Wigan going into the final as "huge underdogs". Mike Pollitt, a former youth player at Manchester United, picked up an injury early in the first half and was replaced by John Filan. Although Manchester United finished the game as comfortable 4–0 winners, Paul Jewell was "proud" of his players and felt the team "didn't get the breaks" they needed to beat their opponents.

| Date | Round | Opponent | Result | Venue | Scorers | Attendance | Match Report |
|---|---|---|---|---|---|---|---|
| 20 September 2005 | Second round | AFC Bournemouth | 1–0 | Home | Roberts 86' | 3,346 | Report |
| 25 October 2005 | Third round | Watford | 3–0 (aet) | Home | Taylor 98' (pen), Johansson 117', 120+1' | 4,531 | Report |
| 30 November 2005 | Fourth round | Newcastle United | 1–0 | Home | Connolly 88' (pen) | 11,574 | Report |
| 20 December 2005 | Quarter-final | Bolton Wanderers | 2–0 | Home | Roberts 40', 45+3' | 13,401 | Report |
| 10 January 2006 | Semi-final (1st leg) | Arsenal | 1–0 | Home | Scharner 78' | 12,181 | Report |
| 24 January 2006 | Semi-final (2nd leg) | Arsenal | 2–1 (aet) | Away | Roberts 119' | 34,692 | Report |
(2–2 on aggregate – Wigan Athletic go through on away goals.)
| 26 February 2006 | Final | Manchester United | 0–4 | Neutral | | 66,866 | Report |

== Squad statistics ==
| # | Pos. | Player | League | | FA Cup | | League Cup | | Total | | Discipline | |
| # | Pos. | Player | Apps | Goals | Apps | Goals | Apps | Goals | Apps | Goals | Booked | Sent off (straight red) |
|---|---|---|---|---|---|---|---|---|---|---|---|---|
| 1 | GK | (Australia) John Filan | 15 | 0 | 3 | 0 | 1 (1) | 0 | 19 (1) | 0 | 0 | 0 |
| 2 | DF | (France) Pascal Chimbonda | 37 | 2 | 2 | 0 | 3 (1) | 0 | 42 (1) | 2 | 7 | 0 |
| 3 | DF | (Scotland) Stephen McMillan | 0 (2) | 0 | 1 | 0 | 4 | 0 | 5 (2) | 0 | 0 | 0 |
| 4 | DF | (England) Matt Jackson | 11 (5) | 0 | 3 | 0 | 4 | 0 | 18 (5) | 0 | 1 | 0 |
| 5 | DF | (Brazil) Emerson Thome | 0 | 0 | 0 | 0 | 3 | 0 | 3 | 0 | 0 | 0 |
| 6 | DF | (Switzerland) Stéphane Henchoz | 26 | 0 | 1 (1) | 0 | 3 (1) | 0 | 30 (2) | 0 | 9 | 0 |
| 7 | FW | (Senegal) Henri Camara | 25 (4) | 12 | 0 | 0 | 2 (1) | 0 | 27 (5) | 12 | 0 | 0 |
| 8 | MF | (Sweden) Andreas Johansson | 6 (10) | 4 | 3 | 1 | 4 (2) | 2 | 13 (12) | 7 | 0 | 1 |
| 10 | MF | (Scotland) Lee McCulloch | 27 (3) | 5 | 1 | 0 | 3 (1) | 0 | 31 (4) | 5 | 8 | 1 |
| 11 | MF | (Republic of Ireland) Graham Kavanagh | 32 (3) | 0 | 1 (1) | 0 | 4 (1) | 0 | 37 (5) | 0 | 9 | 0 |
| 12 | GK | (England) Mike Pollitt | 23 (1) | 0 | 0 | 0 | 6 | 0 | 29 (1) | 0 | 0 | 0 |
| 13 | GK | (England) Gary Walsh | 0 | 0 | 0 | 0 | 0 | 0 | 0 | 0 | 0 | 0 |
| 14 | MF | (Republic of Ireland) Alan Mahon | 5 (1) | 1 | 2 | 0 | 5 | 0 | 12 (1) | 1 | 1 | 0 |
| 15 | DF | (England) David Wright | 1 (1) | 0 | 0 | 0 | 2 | 0 | 3 (1) | 0 | 0 | 0 |
| 16 | DF | (Netherlands) Arjan de Zeeuw | 31 | 0 | 1 | 0 | 3 | 0 | 35 | 0 | 5 | 0 |
| 17 | MF | (Jamaica) Damien Francis | 16 (4) | 1 | 3 | 0 | 1 | 0 | 20 (4) | 1 | 2 | 0 |
| 18 | DF | (Austria) Paul Scharner | 14 (2) | 3 | 1 | 0 | 2 (1) | 1 | 17 (3) | 4 | 6 | 0 |
| 19 | DF | (England) Ryan Taylor | 3 (8) | 0 | 1 | 0 | 4 | 1 | 8 (8) | 1 | 2 | 0 |
| 20 | MF | (Scotland) Gary Teale | 20 (4) | 0 | 1 (1) | 0 | 6 (1) | 0 | 27 (6) | 0 | 0 | 1 |
| 21 | MF | (England) Jimmy Bullard | 35 (1) | 4 | 0 (2) | 0 | 4 | 0 | 39 (3) | 4 | 0 | 0 |
| 22 | FW | (Republic of Ireland) David Connolly | 4 (13) | 1 | 1 | 1 | 2 (1) | 1 | 7 (14) | 3 | 0 | 0 |
| 23 | MF | (Switzerland) Reto Ziegler | 5 (5) | 0 | 1 | 0 | 0 (2) | 0 | 6 (7) | 0 | 0 | 0 |
| 24 | MF | (Australia) Josip Skoko | 3 (2) | 0 | 3 | 0 | 3 | 0 | 9 (2) | 0 | 1 | 0 |
| 26 | DF | (England) Leighton Baines | 35 (2) | 0 | 2 | 0 | 3 (1) | 0 | 40 (3) | 0 | 3 | 0 |
| 27 | MF | (England) David Thompson | 7 (3) | 2 | 0 | 0 | 0 | 0 | 7 (3) | 2 | 4 | 0 |
| 30 | FW | (Grenada) Jason Roberts | 34 | 8 | 1 (2) | 2 | 4 (2) | 4 | 39 (4) | 14 | 4 | 1 |
| 32 | MF | (England) Luke Joyce | 0 | 0 | 0 (1) | 0 | 0 | 0 | 0 (1) | 0 | 0 | 0 |
| 33 | FW | (England) Neil Mellor | 3 | 1 | 1 | 0 | 1 | 0 | 5 | 1 | 0 | 0 |
| 36 | DF | (England) Joey Waterhouse | 0 | 0 | 0 | 0 | 0 (1) | 0 | 0 (1) | 0 | 0 | 0 |

== Transfers ==
After initially struggling to attract players to the club, Mike Pollitt became the club's first signing of the summer. This was followed by the signing of little-known French right-back Pascal Chimbonda, Ryan Taylor of Tranmere Rovers and experienced defender Stéphane Henchoz. Nicky Eaden and Ian Breckin, who both featured regularly in the previous season's promotion winning side, were sold to Nottingham Forest. On 6 August 2005, Wigan signed Senegalese international Henri Camara for £3 million, smashing the club's previous record transfer fee of £2 million paid for striker Jason Roberts. Former player Arjan de Zeeuw also returned to the club after being signed from Portsmouth, and was made the club's captain. Just before the start of the season, West Bromwich Albion made a £3 million bid for previous season's Championship top goalscorer Nathan Ellington. This met the minimum fee release clause in the player's contract, meaning the bid had to be accepted, and Ellington completed the move a few days later. Wigan signed David Connolly for a fee of £2 million as a replacement for Ellington on transfer deadline day.

Wigan strengthened the side further during the January transfer window with new signings Paul Scharner and David Thompson, as well as bringing in Neil Mellor and Reto Ziegler on loan. In April, Fulham had a £2.5 million bid accepted for Jimmy Bullard after the offer had triggered the player's release clause, and a deal was agreed which would be officially completed after the season had finished. After the final match against Arsenal, Pascal Chimbonda almost immediately handed in a transfer request, resulting in a transfer saga that would last for the entire duration of the summer transfer window. Henchoz and Thompson, whose contracts were due to expire, were both released.

=== In ===
| Player | From | Fee | Date | Notes |
|---|---|---|---|---|
| (England) Mike Pollitt | (England) Rotherham United | £200,000 | 30 June 2005 | |
| (France) Pascal Chimbonda | (France) Bastia | £500,000 | 8 July 2005 | |
| (England) Ryan Taylor | (England) Tranmere Rovers | £750,000 | 13 July 2005 | |
| (Switzerland) Stéphane Henchoz | Unattached | Free | 29 July 2005 | |
| (Jamaica) Damien Francis | (England) Norwich City | £1,000,000 | 5 August 2005 | |
| (Senegal) Henri Camara | (England) Wolverhampton Wanderers | £3,000,000 | 6 August 2005 | |
| (Netherlands) Arjan de Zeeuw | (England) Portsmouth | Undisclosed | 12 August 2005 | |
| (Australia) Josip Skoko | (Turkey) Gençlerbirliği | Undisclosed | 23 August 2005 | |
| (Republic of Ireland) David Connolly | (England) Leicester City | £2,000,000 | 31 August 2005 | |
| (Austria) Paul Scharner | (Norway) Brann | £2,000,000 | 1 January 2006 | |
| (England) David Thompson | (England) Blackburn Rovers | Free | 19 January 2006 | |

- Total spending: ▼£9,450,000

=== Out ===
| Player | To | Fee | Date | Notes |
|---|---|---|---|---|
| (England) Nicky Eaden | (England) Nottingham Forest | Free | 1 July 2005 | |
| (England) Ian Breckin | (England) Nottingham Forest | £350,000 | 5 July 2005 | |
| (Brazil) Magno Vieira | Unattached | Free | 8 July 2005 | |
| (Scotland) David Graham | (England) Sheffield Wednesday | £250,000 | 12 August 2005 | |
| (England) Nathan Ellington | (England) West Bromwich Albion | £3,000,000 | 15 August 2005 | |
| (England) Phil Edwards | (England) Accrington Stanley | Free | 12 January 2006 | |
| (Brazil) Emerson Thome | Unattached | Free | 7 February 2006 | |
| (England) Luke Joyce | (England) Carlisle United | Free | 4 April 2006 | |
| (England) Jimmy Bullard | (England) Fulham | £2,500,000 | End of season | |
| (Switzerland) Stéphane Henchoz | Unattached | Free | End of season | |
| (England) David Thompson | Unattached | Free | End of season | |

- Total income: ▲£6,100,000

=== Loans in ===
| Player | From | Start date | End date | Notes |
|---|---|---|---|---|
| (England) Neil Mellor | (England) Liverpool | 19 January 2006 | End of season | |
| (Switzerland) Reto Ziegler | (England) Tottenham Hotspur | 23 January 2006 | End of season | |

=== Loans out ===
| Player | To | Start date | End date | Notes |
|---|---|---|---|---|
| (Brazil) Emerson Thome | (England) Derby County | 27 October 2005 | 26 November 2005 | |
| (England) David Wright | (England) Norwich City | 17 November 2005 | 16 December 2005 | |
| (Australia) Josip Skoko | (England) Stoke City | 7 February 2006 | End of season | |
| (England) Kevin Lee | (England) Blackpool | 23 March 2006 | End of season | |
| (Republic of Ireland) Alan Mahon | (England) Burnley | 23 March 2006 | End of season | |

== Final league table ==
| Pos | Team | Pld | W | D | L | GF | GA | GD | Pts | Qualification or relegation |
|---|---|---|---|---|---|---|---|---|---|---|
| 8 | Bolton Wanderers | 38 | 15 | 11 | 12 | 49 | 41 | +8 | 56 | |
| 9 | West Ham United | 38 | 16 | 7 | 15 | 52 | 55 | −3 | 55 | Qualification for the UEFA Cup first round (Note: Since Liverpool had already qualified for the Champions League, their UEFA Cup berth as the FA Cup winners went to West Ham, who were the FA Cup runners-up.) |
| 10 | Wigan Athletic | 38 | 15 | 6 | 17 | 45 | 52 | −7 | 51 | |
| 11 | Everton | 38 | 14 | 8 | 16 | 34 | 49 | −15 | 50 | |
| 12 | Fulham | 38 | 14 | 6 | 18 | 48 | 58 | −10 | 48 | |

Source: Barclays Premier League
Rules for classification: 1) points; 2) goal difference; 3) number of goals scored.

== See also ==
- List of Wigan Athletic F.C. seasons
- 2005–06 in English football
