= 2007–08 Wigan Athletic F.C. season =

Wigan Athletic
2007–08 season
- Chairman: Dave Whelan
- Manager: Chris Hutchings (until 5 November); Frank Barlow (caretaker); Steve Bruce (from 19 November)
- Premier League: 14th
- FA Cup: Fourth round
- League Cup: Second round
- Top goalscorer: League: Marcus Bent (7); All: Marcus Bent (7)
- Highest home attendance: 25,133 (vs. Manchester United, Premier League, 11 May 2008)
- Lowest home attendance: 5,440 (vs. Hull City, League Cup, 28 August 2007)

The 2007–08 Wigan Athletic F.C. season was the club's 30th season in the Football League and their third season in the Premier League.

== Season summary ==
Under new manager Chris Hutchings, the team started the season well, winning two of their opening three games and briefly leading the Premier League table for the first time in the club's history. However, after going the next ten games without a win, Wigan found themselves in the bottom three. Hutchings was sacked and Birmingham City's Steve Bruce was appointed as the new manager a couple of weeks later. Results began to improve, and the club steadily pulled away from relegation before finally securing their survival in their penultimate game in a 2–0 away win against Aston Villa. The club finished in 14th place at the end of the season.

Wigan had little success in the cups, and were knocked out of the League Cup in their first game against Hull City. The club also made it to the fourth round of the FA Cup before losing 2–1 to Chelsea. Marcus Bent, on loan from Charlton Athletic, finished the season as the club's top goalscorer with a total of seven goals, and Paul Scharner was voted as the club's Player of the Year.

=== Transfers In ===
Date	Position	Name	Club From	Transfer Fee
19 June 2007	Defender	Andreas Granqvist	Helsingborgs	Undisclosed
27 June 2007	Goalkeeper	Carlo Nash	Preston North End	£300,000
1 July 2007	Defender	Mario Melchiot	Stade Rennais	Free Transfer
1 July 2007	Defender	Titus Bramble	Newcastle United	Free Transfer
1 July 2007	Forward	Antoine Sibierski	Newcastle United	Free Transfer
10 July 2007	Midfielder	Jason Koumas	West Bromwich Albion	£5,300,000
31 July 2007	Midfielder	Michael Brown	Fulham	Undisclosed
30 August 2007	Forward	Rachid Bouaouzan	Sparta Rotterdam	Undisclosed
18 January 2008	Midfielder	Antonio Valencia (Note: Valencia had been on loan at the club since August 2006)	Villarreal	Undisclosed
18 January 2008	Defender	Erik Edman	Stade Rennais	Undisclosed
25 January 2008	Forward	Marlon King	Watford	Undisclosed

=== Transfers Out ===
Date	Position	Name	Club To	Transfer Fee
24 May 2007	Defender	Matt Jackson	Watford	Free Transfer
1 July 2007	Goalkeeper	John Filan	Free Agency	Released
1 July 2007	Defender	David Unsworth	Free Agency	Released
1 July 2007	Defender	Arjan de Zeeuw	Free Agency	Released
11 July 2007	Midfielder	Lee McCulloch	Rangers	£2,250,000
7 August 2007	Defender	Leighton Baines	Everton	£6,000,000
31 August 2007	Forward	Caleb Folan	Hull City	£1,000,000
25 January 2008	Forward	Denny Landzaat	Feyenoord	£1,000,000

=== Loans In ===
Date	Position	Name	Club From	Length
31 August 2007	Forward	Marcus Bent	Charlton Athletic	Full Season
17 January 2008	Defender	Maynor Figueroa	Olimpia	Until end of season
31 January 2008	Defender	Erik Hagen	Zenit St. Petersburg	Until end of season

=== Loans Out ===
Date	Position	Name	Club From	Length
31 August 2007	Forward	Henri Camara	West Ham United	Full Season

== Results ==
=== Premier League ===
==== Results summary ====
Overall								Home						Away					
Pld	W	D	L	GF	GA	GD	Pts	W	D	L	GF	GA	GD	W	D	L	GF	GA	GD
38	10	10	18	34	51	−17	40	8	5	6	21	17	+4	2	5	12	13	34	−21

Last updated: 24 January 2019.
Source: 11v11

==== Results per matchday ====
Matchday	1	2	3	4	5	6	7	8	9	10	11	12	13	14	15	16	17	18	19	20	21	22	23	24	25	26	27	28	29	30	31	32	33	34	35	36	37	38
Ground	A	H	H	A	A	H	A	H	A	H	A	H	A	A	H	A	H	A	H	H	A	A	H	A	H	A	H	A	H	H	A	A	H	A	H	H	A	H
Result	L	W	W	D	L	D	L	L	L	L	L	L	L	L	D	L	W	D	W	L	D	W	L	L	W	L	W	D	D	W	L	L	W	D	D	D	W	L
Position	17	10	1	3	7	10	10	12	14	16	16	18	19	19	19	19	19	19	17	18	17	17	17	18	15	16	14	14	13	12	14	16	14	15	13	14	13	14

Updated to match(es) played on 11 May 2008. Source: Statto.com
A = Away; H = Home; W = Win; D = Draw; L = Loss

Match	Date	Opponent	Venue	Result	Attendance	Scorers	Report
1	11 August 2007	Everton	A	1–2	39,220	Sibierski 80'	Report
2	15 August 2007	Middlesbrough	H	1–0	14,007	Sibierski 55'	Report
3	18 August 2007	Sunderland	H	3–0	18,639	Heskey 19', Landzaat 62' (pen), Sibierski 69' (pen)	Report
4	25 August 2007	West Ham United	A	1–1	33,793	Scharner 78'	Report
5	1 September 2007	Newcastle United	A	0–1	50,461		Report
6	15 September 2007	Fulham	H	1–1	16,973	Koumas 80' (pen)	Report
7	22 September 2007	Reading	A	1–2	21,379	Bent 50'	Report
8	29 September 2007	Liverpool	H	0–1	24,311		Report
9	6 October 2007	Manchester United	A	0–4	75,300		Report
10	20 October 2007	Portsmouth	H	0–2	17,695		Report
11	27 October 2007	Birmingham City	A	2–3	27,661	Bent (2) 23', 59'	Report
12	3 November 2007	Chelsea	H	0–2	19,011		Report
13	11 November 2007	Tottenham Hotspur	A	0–4	35,504		Report
14	24 November 2007	Arsenal	A	0–2	60,126		Report
15	1 December 2007	Manchester City	H	1–1	18,614	Scharner 25'	Report
16	9 December 2007	Bolton Wanderers	A	1–4	20,309	Landzaat 14'	Report
17	15 December 2007	Blackburn Rovers	H	5–3	16,489	Landzaat 10', Bent (3) 12', 66', 81', Scharner 37'	Report
18	22 December 2007	Fulham	A	1–1	20,820	Bent 70'	Report
19	26 December 2007	Newcastle United	H	1–0	20,304	Taylor 40'	Report
20	29 December 2007	Aston Villa	H	1–2	18,806	Bramble 28'	Report
21	2 January 2008	Liverpool	A	1–1	42,302	Bramble 80'	Report
22	12 January 2008	Derby County	A	1–0	31,652	Sibierski 82'	Report
23	20 January 2008	Everton	H	1–2	18,820	Jagielka 53' (o.g.)	Report
24	29 January 2008	Middlesbrough	A	0–1	22,963		Report
25	2 February 2008	West Ham United	H	1–0	20,525	Kilbane 45'	Report
26	9 February 2008	Sunderland	A	0–2	43,600		Report
27	23 February 2008	Derby County	H	2–0	20,176	Scharner 60', Valencia 84'	Report
28	1 March 2008	Manchester City	A	0–0	38,261		Report
29	9 March 2008	Arsenal	H	0–0	19,676		Report
30	16 March 2008	Bolton Wanderers	H	1–0	17,055	Heskey 33'	Report
31	22 March 2008	Blackburn Rovers	A	1–3	23,541	King 17' (pen)	Report
32	29 March 2008	Portsmouth	A	0–2	18,623		Report
33	5 April 2008	Birmingham City	H	2–0	17,926	Taylor (2) 15', 55'	Report
34	14 April 2008	Chelsea	A	1–1	40,487	Heskey 90'	Report
35	19 April 2008	Tottenham Hotspur	H	1–1	18,673	Heskey 12'	Report
36	26 April 2008	Reading	H	0–0	19,043		Report
37	3 May 2008	Aston Villa	A	2–0	42,640	Valencia (2) 52', 63'	Report
38	11 May 2008	Manchester United	H	0–2	25,133		Report

=== Final league table ===
Pos	Team	Pld	W	D	L	GF	GA	GD	Pts
12	Newcastle United	38	11	10	17	45	65	−20	43
13	Middlesbrough	38	10	12	16	43	53	−10	42
14	Wigan Athletic	38	10	10	18	34	51	−17	40
15	Sunderland	38	11	6	21	36	59	−23	39
16	Bolton Wanderers	38	9	10	19	36	54	−18	37

Source: Barclays Premier League
Rules for classification: 1) points; 2) goal difference; 3) number of goals scored.
For further information on European qualification see Premier League – Competition

=== FA Cup ===
Round	Date	Opponent	Venue	Result	Attendance	Scorers	Report
R3	5 January 2008	Sunderland	A	3–0	20,821	Scharner, Cotterill, McShane (o.g.)	Report
R4	26 January 2008	Chelsea	H	1–2	14,166	Sibierski	Report

=== League Cup ===
Round	Date	Opponent	Venue	Result	Attendance	Scorers	Report
R2	28 August 2007	Hull City	H	0–1	5,440		Report

== Squad ==
=== First-team squad ===
(Sources) Note: Flags indicate national team as defined under FIFA eligibility rules; some limited exceptions apply. Players may hold more than one non-FIFA nationality.

No.	Pos.	Nation	Player
1	GK	ENG	Chris Kirkland
2	DF	ENG	Ryan Taylor
3	DF	SWE	Erik Edman
5	MF	HON	Wilson Palacios
6	FW	FRA	Antoine Sibierski
8	MF	IRL	Kevin Kilbane
9	FW	ENG	Emile Heskey
10	MF	WAL	Jason Koumas
11	MF	ENG	Michael Brown
12	GK	ENG	Mike Pollitt
14	FW	JAM	Marlon King
15	FW	NGR	Julius Aghahowa
16	MF	ECU	Antonio Valencia

No.	Pos.	Nation	Player
17	DF	BRB	Emmerson Boyce
18	DF	AUT	Paul Scharner
19	DF	ENG	Titus Bramble
20	DF	CMR	Salomon Olembé
21	MF	POL	Tomasz Cywka
23	FW	ENG	Marcus Bent (on loan from Charlton Athletic)
24	MF	AUS	Josip Skoko
25	DF	NED	Mario Melchiot (captain)
26	MF	NED	Rachid Bouaouzan
27	MF	POL	Tomasz Kupisz
31	DF	HON	Maynor Figueroa (on loan from Olimpia)
32	DF	NOR	Erik Hagen (on loan from Zenit St. Petersburg)

=== On loan ===
Note: Flags indicate national team as defined under FIFA eligibility rules; some limited exceptions apply. Players may hold more than one non-FIFA nationality.

No.	Pos.	Nation	Player
4	DF	SWE	Andreas Granqvist (at Helsingborg)
7	FW	SEN	Henri Camara (at West Ham United)
13	GK	ENG	Carlo Nash (at Stoke City)

No.	Pos.	Nation	Player
22	MF	WAL	David Cotterill (at Sheffield United)
—	DF	SCO	Andy Webster (at Rangers)

== See also ==
- List of Wigan Athletic F.C. seasons
- 2007–08 in English football
