= 2006–07 Wigan Athletic F.C. season =

Wigan Athletic
2006–07 season
- Chairman: Dave Whelan
- Manager: Paul Jewell
- FA Premier League: 17th
- FA Cup: Third Round
- League Cup: Second Round
- Top goalscorer: Emile Heskey (9)
- Highest home attendance: 24,726 (v West Ham United, FA Premier League, 28 April 2007)
- Lowest home attendance: 14,636 (v Reading, FA Premier League, 26 August 2006)
Home colours	Away colours

The 2006–07 Wigan Athletic F.C. season was the club's 29th season in the Football League and their second season in the Premier League.

== Season summary ==
The club struggled to repeat the successes of its previous season and fell victim to "second season syndrome". They were knocked out of both domestic cups at the first round of entry, and finished 17th in the league after securing Premier League survival on the last day of the season in an away win against Sheffield United, who were relegated instead on goal difference.

A day after the end of the season, manager Paul Jewell resigned after six years in charge of the club. His assistant manager Chris Hutchings was appointed as his replacement. Summer signing Emile Heskey (signed for a record fee of £5.5 million) finished the season as the club's top goalscorer with a total of eight goals, and left-back Leighton Baines won the Supporters' Player of the Year award, and the Players' Player award.

== Transfers ==
=== In ===
Player	From	Fee	Date	Notes
(England) Fitz Hall	(England) Crystal Palace	£3,000,000	26 June 2006	
(Poland) Tomasz Cywka	(Poland) Gwarek Zabrze	Undisclosed	5 July 2006	
(England) Emile Heskey	(England) Birmingham City	£5,500,000	8 July 2006	
(Netherlands) Denny Landzaat	(Netherlands) AZ Alkmaar	£2,500,000	18 July 2006	
(Barbados) Emmerson Boyce	(England) Crystal Palace	£1,000,000	1 August 2006	
(Republic of Ireland) Kevin Kilbane	(England) Everton	£2,000,000	31 August 2006	
(Wales) David Cotterill	(England) Bristol City	£2,000,000	31 August 2006	
(Scotland) Andy Webster	(Scotland) Hearts	Free^{[A]}	4 September 2006	
(England) Chris Kirkland	(England) Liverpool	Undisclosed	27 October 2006	
(England) David Unsworth	(England) Sheffield United	Free	7 January 2007	
(Republic of Ireland) Caleb Folan	(England) Chesterfield	£500,000	26 January 2007	
(Nigeria) Julius Aghahowa	(Ukraine) Shakhtar Donetsk	Undisclosed	30 January 2007	

=== Out ===
Player	To	Fee	Date	Notes
(Grenada) Jason Roberts	(England) Blackburn Rovers	£3,000,000	4 July 2006	
(Jamaica) Damien Francis	(England) Watford	£1,500,000	14 July 2006	
(France) Pascal Chimbonda	(England) Tottenham Hotspur	Undisclosed	31 August 2006	
(Republic of Ireland) Graham Kavanagh	(England) Sunderland	£500,000	31 August 2006	
(Republic of Ireland) David Connolly	(England) Sunderland	£1,400,000	31 August 2006	
(England) David Wright	(England) Ipswich Town	Undisclosed	11 January 2007	
(Scotland) Gary Teale	(England) Derby County	£600,000	11 January 2007	
(England) Matt Jackson	(England) Watford	Free	End of season	

=== Released ===
Player	Date	Notes
(Scotland) Steve McMillan	4 March 2007	
(Netherlands) Arjan de Zeeuw	End of season	
(England) David Unsworth	End of season	

=== Loans in ===
Player	From	Start date	End date	Notes
(England) Chris Kirkland	(England) Liverpool	12 July 2006	27 October 2006^{[B]}	
(Ecuador) Antonio Valencia	(Spain) Villarreal	11 August 2006	End of season	
(Bulgaria) Svetoslav Todorov	(England) Portsmouth	31 August 2006	31 December 2006	
(Norway) Kristofer Hæstad	(Norway) Start	1 January 2007	31 March 2007^{[C]}	
(Sweden) Andreas Granqvist	(Sweden) Helsingborg	1 January 2007	End of season	
(England) Carlo Nash	(England) Preston North End	19 February 2007	18 March 2007	

=== Loans out ===
Player	To	Start date	End date	Notes
(Australia) John Filan	(England) Doncaster Rovers	6 October 2006	5 November 2006	
(Poland) Tomasz Cywka	(England) Oldham Athletic	1 November 2006	20 December 2006^{[D]}	
(England) Mike Pollitt	(England) Ipswich Town	15 November 2006	23 November 2006^{[E]}	
(Scotland) Andy Webster	(Scotland) Rangers	5 January 2007	End of season	
(England) Mike Pollitt	(England) Burnley	11 January 2007	10 February 2007	

== Pre-season ==
Date	Opponent	Venue	Result	Scorers	Notes
25 July 2006	Persepolis	N	4–2	Heskey, Camara (2), Johansson	
27 July 2006	Utrecht	N	1–1	Landzaat	
1 August 2006	Barnsley	A	2–1	Connolly, Camara	
2 August 2006	Southport	A	2–0	King, McCulloch	
5 August 2006	Halifax Town	A	2–1	Camara, Connolly	
9 August 2006	Rosenborg	A	2–1	Connolly, McCulloch	
12 August 2006	Vitesse Arnhem	H	1–1	McCulloch	

== Results ==
Wigan Athletic's score comes first

=== Legend ===
Win	Draw	Loss

=== FA Premier League ===
==== Results by matchday ====
Matchday	1	2	3	4	5	6	7	8	9	10	11	12	13	14	15	16	17	18	19	20	21	22	23	24	25	26	27	28	29	30	31	32	33	34	35	36	37	38
Ground	A	H	A	A	H	A	H	H	A	A	H	H	A	H	A	A	H	H	H	A	H	A	H	A	H	A	A	H	A	H	A	H	A	H	A	H	H	A
Result	L	W	L	D	D	L	L	W	W	W	W	D	L	L	W	D	L	L	L	L	L	L	L	L	W	L	D	W	W	D	L	L	D	D	L	L	L	W
Position	15	12	14	15	14	15	17	15	14	11	8	9	11	13	11	11	12	13	14	15	16	17	17	17	17	17	17	16	15	15	15	16	16	15	16	17	18	17

Source: WorldFootball.net
A = Away; H = Home; W = Win; D = Draw; L = Loss

Premier League match details
Date	Opponent	Venue	Result	Attendance	Scorers
19 August 2006	Newcastle United	A	1–2	51,569	McCulloch
26 August 2006	Reading	H	1–0	14,636	Heskey
9 September 2006	Portsmouth	A	0–1	19,508	
16 September 2006	Everton	A	2–2	37,117	Scharner (2)
23 September 2006	Watford	H	1–1	16,359	Camara
1 October 2006	Blackburn Rovers	A	1–2	17,859	Heskey
14 October 2006	Manchester United	H	1–3	20,631	Baines
21 October 2006	Manchester City	H	4–0	16,235	Heskey, Dunne (own goal), Camara, Valencia
28 October 2006	Fulham	A	1–0	22,882	Camara
4 November 2006	Bolton Wanderers	A	1–0	21,255	McCulloch
11 November 2006	Charlton Athletic	H	3–2	16,572	McCulloch, Camara, Jackson
19 November 2006	Aston Villa	H	0–0	18,455	
26 November 2006	Tottenham Hotspur	A	1–3	35,205	Camara
2 December 2006	Liverpool	H	0–4	22,089	
6 December 2006	West Ham United	A	2–0	33,805	Cotterill, Spector (own goal)
9 December 2006	Middlesbrough	A	1–1	23,638	Camara (pen)
13 December 2006	Arsenal	H	0–1	15,311	
16 December 2006	Sheffield United	H	0–1	16,322	
23 December 2006	Chelsea	H	2–3	22,077	Heskey (2)
26 December 2006	Manchester United	A	1–3	76,018	Baines (pen)
30 December 2006	Watford	A	A–A (Note: Abandoned after 56 minutes due to a waterlogged pitch.)		Heskey
1 January 2007	Blackburn Rovers	H	0–3	14,864	
13 January 2007	Chelsea	A	0–4	40,846	
21 January 2007	Everton	H	0–2	18,149	
30 January 2007	Reading	A	2–3	21,954	Heskey, Landzaat
3 February 2007	Portsmouth	H	1–0	15,093	McCulloch
11 February 2007	Arsenal	A	1–2	60,049	Landzaat
21 February 2007	Watford	A	1–1	18,338	Folan
25 February 2007	Newcastle United	H	1–0	21,179	Taylor
3 March 2007	Manchester City	A	1–0	39,923	Folan
17 March 2007	Fulham	H	0–0	16,001	
31 March 2007	Charlton Athletic	A	0–1	26,500	
7 April 2007	Bolton Wanderers	H	1–3	18,610	Hunt (o.g.) (Note: Goal was originally credited to Emile Heskey, but was ruled as a Nicky Hunt own goal by the Dubious Goals Panel.)
9 April 2007	Aston Villa	A	1–1	31,920	Heskey
15 April 2007	Tottenham Hotspur	H	3–3	16,506	Heskey, Baines, Kilbane
21 April 2007	Liverpool	A	0–2	44,003	
28 April 2007	West Ham United	H	0–3	24,726	
5 May 2007	Middlesbrough	H	0–1	21,204	
13 May 2007	Sheffield United	A	2–1	32,604	Scharner, Unsworth

=== Final league table ===
Pos	Team	Pld	W	D	L	GF	GA	GD	Pts	Qualification or relegation
15	West Ham United	38	12	5	21	35	59	−24	41	
16	Fulham	38	8	15	15	38	60	−22	39	
17	Wigan Athletic	38	10	8	20	37	59	−22	38	
18	Sheffield United (R)	38	10	8	20	32	55	−23	38	Relegation to Football League Championship
19	Charlton Athletic (R)	38	8	10	20	34	60	−26	34	Relegation to Football League Championship

Source: Barclays Premier League
Rules for classification: 1) points; 2) goal difference; 3) number of goals scored.
(R) Relegated

=== FA Cup ===
Round	Date	Opponent	Venue	Result	Attendance	Goalscorers
R3	6 January 2007	Portsmouth	A	1–2	14,336 (477 away)	McCulloch

=== League Cup ===
Round	Date	Opponent	Venue	Result	Attendance	Goalscorers
R2	19 September 2006	Crewe Alexandra	A	0–2	3,907 (815 away)	

== Statistics ==
=== Appearances and goals ===
Up to end of season

No.	Pos	Nat	Player	Total		Premier League		FA Cup		League Cup	
No.	Pos	Nat	Player	Apps	Goals	Apps	Goals	Apps	Goals	Apps	Goals
Goalkeepers
1	GK	(Australia) AUS	John Filan	10	0	10	0	0	0	0	0
12	GK	(England) ENG	Mike Pollitt	7	0	4+1	0	1	0	1	0
13	GK	(England) ENG	Chris Kirkland	26	0	26	0	0	0	0	0
Defenders
2	DF	(Sweden) SWE	Andreas Granqvist	2	0	1	0	1	0	0	0
4	DF	(England) ENG	Matt Jackson	23	1	17+4	1	0+1	0	1	0
5	DF	(England) ENG	Fitz Hall	26	0	22+2	0	1	0	1	0
6	DF	(Netherlands) NED	Arjan De Zeeuw	23	0	21+1	0	0	0	0+1	0
17	DF	(Barbados) BRB	Emmerson Boyce	35	0	34	0	1	0	0	0
19	DF	(England) ENG	Ryan Taylor	16	1	12+4	1	0	0	0	0
25	DF	(England) ENG	David Unsworth	10	1	6+4	1	0	0	0	0
26	DF	(England) ENG	Leighton Baines	37	3	35	3	1	0	1	0
Midfielders
8	MF	(Republic of Ireland) IRL	Kevin Kilbane	33	1	26+5	1	1	0	1	0
10	MF	(Scotland) SCO	Lee McCulloch	30	6	25+4	5	1	1	0	0
11	MF	(Sweden) SWE	Andreas Johansson	14	0	4+8	0	1	0	1	0
14	MF	(Netherlands) NED	Denny Landzaat	35	2	29+4	2	1	0	1	0
16	MF	(Ecuador) ECU	Antonio Valencia	22	1	17+5	1	0	0	0	0
18	MF	(Austria) AUT	Paul Scharner	26	3	22+3	3	0	0	1	0
21	MF	(Poland) POL	Tomasz Cywka	2	0	1	0	0	0	1	0
22	MF	(Wales) WAL	David Cotterill	17	1	5+11	1	1	0	0	0
24	MF	(Australia) AUS	Josip Skoko	28	0	24+4	0	0	0	0	0
31	MF	(England) ENG	Lewis Montrose	2	0	0+1	0	0	0	0+1	0
Forwards
7	FW	(Senegal) SEN	Henri Camara	23	6	18+5	6	0	0	0	0
9	FW	(England) ENG	Emile Heskey	37	8	33+2	8	1	0	0+1	0
15	FW	(Nigeria) NGR	Julius Aghahowa	6	0	3+3	0	0	0	0	0
20	FW	(Republic of Ireland) IRL	Caleb Folan	13	2	8+5	2	0	0	0	0
Players transferred out during the season
2	DF	(France) FRA	Pascal Chimbonda	1	0	0+1	0	0	0	0	0
8	MF	(Republic of Ireland) IRL	Graham Kavanagh	2	0	0+2	0	0	0	0	0
15	DF	(England) ENG	David Wright	13	0	6+6	0	0	0	1	0
20	MF	(Scotland) SCO	Gary Teale	15	0	7+6	0	0+1	0	1	0
22	FW	(Republic of Ireland) IRL	David Connolly	2	0	0+2	0	0	0	0	0
23	DF	(Scotland) SCO	Andy Webster	4	0	3+1	0	0	0	0	0
25	FW	(Bulgaria) BUL	Svetoslav Todorov	5	0	2+3	0	0	0	0	0
27	MF	(Norway) NOR	Kristofer Hæstad	4	0	1+2	0	0+1	0	0	0

== Notes ==
A. For more information about this transfer, see Webster ruling.
B. Kirkland initially signed on a six-month loan, but the deal was made permanent on 27 October 2006.
C. Haestad initially signed on loan until the end of the season, but the deal was ended early.
D. Cywka was initially loaned out for a month, but the deal was later extended.
E. Pollitt was initially loaned out for a month, but was recalled early by Wigan

== See also ==
- List of Wigan Athletic F.C. seasons
- 2006–07 in English football
