= 2008–09 Wigan Athletic F.C. season =

Wigan Athletic
- Chairman: Dave Whelan
- Manager: Steve Bruce
- Premier League: 11th
- FA Cup: Third round
- League Cup: Fourth round
- Top goalscorer: League: Amr Zaki (10); All: Amr Zaki (11)
- Highest home attendance: 22,954 (vs. Arsenal)
- Lowest home attendance: 4,100 (vs. Notts County)

Wigan Athletic's season in the 2008–09 Premier League was their fourth season in the Premier League, and Steve Bruce’s first full season as the manager of the club. The off-season saw the club sign a number of players, including Middlesbrough's highly rated young midfielder Lee Cattermole, Birmingham City pair Daniël de Ridder and Olivier Kapo, both of whom played under Bruce at Birmingham, and little-known Egyptian striker Amr Zaki, ranked as the world's best striker in FIFA rankings.

The club saw no forced sales during the transfer window, with players like Emile Heskey, Paul Scharner, Luis Antonio Valencia and Wilson Palacios deciding to commit their futures to the club rather than move away. Players to depart from the club included Julius Aghahowa, Salomon Olembé, Josip Skoko, Andreas Granqvist, Marlon King and Marcus Bent.

== Season summary ==
=== July and August ===
During the pre-season, Wigan played in seven friendlies, all away from home, to prepare for the upcoming Premier League season. Their first friendly match was on 19 July away to FC St. Veit, which Wigan won 3–0. The next game was played on 22 July against Bundesliga side Eintracht Frankfurt; Eintracht won 2–0. A further away game in Germany was played on 25 July against another Bundesliga club, Hannover, which finished 2–2.

Wigan's first friendly on English soil was on 29 July at Barnsley, which saw the Latics give a debut to Lee Cattermole. The Wigan club thrashed the Yorkshire outfit 6–0 with goals from Marlon King, Emile Heskey, Luis Antonio Valencia, Michael Brown and a brace for new boy Daniël de Ridder. Wigan made the short trip to Sheffield on 2 August to play Championship club Sheffield Wednesday, defeating them 3–2. Wigan later travelled to Scotland to face Scottish Premier League team Hibernian on 5 August, winning 1–0 before finishing off their pre-season with a 1–0 victory over Dutch side Utrecht.

Wigan's first Premiership game was away to West Ham United on 16 August, with the home side victorious thanks to a Dean Ashton brace. Wigan finished the game the better side, according to reports, and had the better possession and territory overall for the whole game but could only muster one goal, from debutant Amr Zaki, losing 2–1.

On 24 August Wigan played their first game at the JJB Stadium, against last season's Premier League runners-up Chelsea. The game began badly for Wigan who, already without first-choice goalkeeper Chris Kirkland, gave away a free kick after just 4 minutes of play just outside the box, which was scored by Deco. Despite going down early the Latics rallied and performed valiantly against one of the superior Premier League sides and pressed for an equalising goal, which, in the end, was in vain as Chelsea ran out 1–0 victors.

On 26 August Wigan played against Notts County at the JJB Stadium in the second round of the League Cup, which led to a comprehensive 4–0 victory for the hosts. Many of Wigan's fringe players, including striker Henri Camara, shone in this one-sided affair with goals coming from Camara (2), Zaki and Tomasz Kupisz.

On 30 August Wigan played away to Premiership newcomers Hull City in a Premier League game that, if Hull won, would take them to the top of the table. Wigan, however, were not to be thwarted three times in a row and thrashed Hull 5–0, the club's biggest victory in the Premiership. Hull began woefully with poor defending leading to an own goal by Sam Ricketts from a Kevin Kilbane corner within 5 minutes. Antonio Valencia added a second on the counterattack and, despite some decent resolve from Hull, they were finished after an Amr Zaki strike just after the hour mark made sure of the result. Later goals were added by Zaki and Emile Heskey.

=== September ===
Wigan's next home fixture was played against Sunderland on 13 September; the fixture which had caused controversy within the town due to the decision to move a Rugby League fixture the previous day by owner Dave Whelan to allow the pitch to be in good condition for the game against Sunderland, a move which angered many Wigan Warriors fans. The game itself started well for Sunderland, who dominated the game and eventually opened the scoring when Wigan defender Titus Bramble tried to clear the resulting corner and headed into his own goal. Wigan finished the half the better side and came out after half-time much the same but struggled to find the equaliser. The game became a more even affair nearer the end of the second half, with both side posting good chances. It was Wigan who would break Sunderland's resistance, however, with another goal from Amr Zaki equalising matters for Wigan before Lee Cattermole was given a red card in the final minutes of the game.

On 16 September, Wigan announced the signing for former Birmingham and Ghanaian international goalkeeper Richard Kingson, released by the Midlands club at the end of the 2007–08 season, on a three-year contract after a successful trial period.

On 21 September Wigan travelled to White Hart Lane to face Tottenham Hotspur. The last time Wigan faced Tottenham they were heavily defeated 4–0, but performed much better against a struggling Tottenham side who, before the game, were rooted to the bottom of the Premiership. Wigan had a few decent chances but struggled to dominate the game for large periods, with only Tottenham's toothless attacking plays keeping Wigan in the game. Spurs had a claim for a penalty after Maynor Figueroa tripped Spurs midfielder Aaron Lennon in the box, but referee Steve Tanner dismissed their calls for a spot-kick.

On 28 September Wigan faced Manchester City at the JJB Stadium. A long-range Antonio Valencia goal and an Amr Zaki penalty gave Wigan a 2–1 win; City's consolation goal was scored by Vincent Kompany.

=== October ===
On 4 October Wigan again played at home, against a struggling Middlesbrough side who had not won away from home all season. Wigan had looked confident and the most threatening during the opening half but were unable to take their chances when given them and were eventually undone in the 89th minute with a strike from Middlesbrough forward Jérémie Aliadière.

On 18 October, Wigan travelled to Anfield to play league leaders Liverpool. Wigan showed sheer determination throughout the whole game and took the lead on the 29th minute from the head of lead goalscorer Amr Zaki. Dirk Kuyt later levelled things for Liverpool before a sensational strike from Zaki moments before half time gave Wigan the lead for the second time in the game. Wigan dominated the majority of the second half before a reckless challenge from Antonio Valencia led to him being given a second yellow card and leaving the field. The game opened up more for Liverpool who were inspired by Wigan's disadvantage and Albert Riera restored parity five minutes after the dismissal of Valencia. Wigan then had to play defensively for the remainder of the game as Liverpool assaulted the Wigan goal and were successful just five minutes before the end of the game as Dirk Kuyt nodded home a Jermaine Pennant cross to win the game for Liverpool.

On 26 October, Wigan hosted an in-form Aston Villa side who comfortably beat Wigan 4–0. Gareth Barry had opened the scoring early in the first half after Titus Bramble gave away a penalty and were battered into submission in the second half with goals from Gabriel Agbonlahor and John Carew within five minutes of each other ending the game as a contest, a final goal from Steve Sidwell moments before the end compounding the misery for Wigan.

On 29 October, Wigan travelled to Fulham. The game finished with another loss for Wigan, their fourth in a row. Both sides had been struggling for form before the game and it was billed as a relegation battle in which Fulham came out successful with a 2–0 victory. Andrew Johnson celebrated his 100th career goal in this game with an early goal and then another on the hour mark to finish off Wigan's resilence and put pressure on Wigan boss Steve Bruce.

=== November ===
On 1 November, Wigan's luck changed as they managed to take all three points in a hard-fought victory at Fratton Park against Portsmouth. Portsmouth controlled the opening half but a foul on Titus Bramble by Papa Bouba Diop led to a penalty, converted by Amr Zaki on the stroke of half time. Portsmouth came out in the second half strong and bombarded the Wigan goal, hitting the woodwork a total of four times before Wigan made Portsmouth pay for their wasteful demeanour with Emile Heskey bagging his 100th career goal to give Wigan a precious three points in the final minutes of the game.

On 8 November, Wigan hosted Stoke City at the JJB Stadium. Wigan dominated the game but both sides were largely uninspiring in the first half with very few chances to be had. Wigan were better equipped in the second half and peppered the Stoke goal but were left frustrated at Stoke's defensive prowess; the game ended 0–0.

On 11 November, Wigan travelled to the Emirates Stadium to face Arsenal in the fourth round of the League Cup. Although both sides largely players their reserve players, it was Arsenal who were victorious in a very one-sided affair. The game took a while to come to life, but a goal by Jay Simpson just before half-time broke the deadlock and spurred Arsenal onto an emphatic win against a toothless Wigan side. A further goal for Simpson and a goal from Carlos Vela ended Wigan's run in the League Cup.

On 15 November, Wigan travelled to St James' Park to face Newcastle United. The first half was well controlled and organised by Wigan against a sloppy Newcastle, who conceded within three minutes after a wonder strike from Ryan Taylor. In the second half Newcastle looked more determined and were galvanised by a second bookable offence for Wigan's Emmerson Boyce. Wigan still looked in control of the game for large periods despite missing key men such as Emile Heskey and Amr Zaki, but were undone with the arrival of Michael Owen. It was Owen's attacking threat that eventually broke through and pulled Newcastle level on the 80th minute; seven minutes later, Owen's striker partner Obafemi Martins scored to put Newcastle in a seemingly unassailable position with minutes remaining. However, poor defending from Newcastle allowed Titus Bramble to power a header home with a minute of normal time remaining to earn Wigan a point.

On 24 November, Wigan played a home fixture against Everton. In a game that offered many opportunities for both sides but woeful finishing it would be Wigan who would eventually break the deadlock with a strike from Henri Camara midway through the second half ensuring Wigan took all three points and clawed themselves out of the relegation zone. It was Camara's first Premier League goal since December 2006.

Wigan finished the month by hosting fellow strugglers West Bromwich Albion on 29 November. In a game that West Brom had fought hard in they initially took the lead through Ishmael Miller after a Titus Bramble blunder gifted the striker an opportunity on goal. West Brom could have had a further lead if not for the form of Chris Kirkland, who made numerous saves to keep Wigan in the game. Wigan would equalise through Henri Camara just after the hour mark and an 87th-minute goal from an unmarked Emmerson Boyce finished off an unlucky West Brom and gave Wigan a vital three points.

=== December ===
On 6 December, Wigan returned to the Emirates Stadium to face an out-of-form Arsenal. It was to be Arsenal's day, however, as Emmanuel Adebayor scored against the run of play in the 16th minute to give Arsenal a lead they would never lose and strike a blow to Wigan's confidence, despite a strong attacking threat in the final minutes from Wigan.

On 13 December, Wigan hosted a Blackburn Rovers side in very poor form and eased to a 3–0 victory over their north-west rivals. Two early goals within two minutes of each other from Heskey and Valencia finished the game as a contest after 20 minutes with Lee Cattermole eventually ending the game with a third goal for Wigan midway through the second half.

On 26 December, Wigan were again at home, this time against Newcastle United. Newcastle, despite good form coming into the game, were out of sorts and were behind on the scoreboard after 29 minutes with a 30-yard free kick from Ryan Taylor beating Shay Given. The second half had Newcastle offering little more than in the first half and things got worse for the north-east outfit when Sébastien Bassong upended Amr Zaki in the penalty area and was given a red card with the penalty being converted by Zaki moments later. Newcastle did get a penalty of their own after a Chris Kirkland took Andy Carroll out in the penalty box and Danny Guthrie added a consolation goal at the end of a lacklustre performance.

On 28 December, Wigan travelled the short distance to the Reebok Stadium to face Bolton Wanderers. Due to the significance of the game, being both a derby and a potential six-point fixture, tempers were heated and a lot of heavy tackles were used with several yellow cards being shown. Wigan did get the opening goal from the penalty spot after Andy O'Brien fouled Amr Zaki just before half time. Bolton then pressed for an equaliser and had the ball cleared off the line at one point during the game but could not find an equaliser and Wigan went home with all three points.

=== January ===
Wigan's first game of the new year came on 2 January in an FA Cup third round clash at Tottenham Hotspur. Wigan played a much weaker side than they had been playing in the Premiership up to now and it showed with Spurs dominating the game and running out comfortable 3–1 winners. Roman Pavlyuchenko opened the scoring for Spurs just inside the second half from the penalty spot after Wigan goalkeeper Richard Kingson fouled Fraizer Campbell. A long range shot from Jamie O'Hara bounced back off the woodwork at straight to Luka Modrić, who doubled Spurs' advantage midway through the second half. Wigan did fight back and earned themselves a goal through Henri Camara two minutes from time, but as they pressed forward for an equaliser they were caught on the counter by Pavlyuchenko, who added a third in stoppage time to knock Wigan out of the cup at the first hurdle.

On 11 January Wigan had a return match in the Premier League against Tottenham, at the JJB Stadium. Wigan dominated the game for almost the full 90 minutes and were comfortable with Spurs' attacking strategies. Their hard work and endeavour paid off when Maynor Figueroa popped up with a header in the final minute to give Wigan a well-deserved 1–0 victory.

On 12 January, Wigan announced a successful work permit application to allow Colombian international Hugo Rodallega to join Wigan from Mexican side Club Necaxa.

On 14 January, Wigan travelled to Old Trafford to face reigning champions Manchester United in a rescheduled game. Wigan were caught cold in the opening minute of the game when Cristiano Ronaldo broke away down the right flank and crossed for Wayne Rooney to score. Despite heavy pressure from Manchester United in the first half, Wigan's defence remained strong and the second half saw Wigan dominate the champions and have a penalty claim harshly denied by referee Steve Bennett, but Wigan could not take their opportunities and United held on to claim victory. Wigan had also announced that they had rejected a bid for midfielder Wilson Palacios from Tottenham Hotspur worth £10,000,000 and have asked Spurs to increase their offer. Tottenham returned with an improved offer of £14,000,000 which was accepted by the Wigan club. The deal, however, was held up after a disagreement over the payment of transfer fees, allowing Manchester City to voice interest.

On 15 January, it was announced that left-sided midfielder Kevin Kilbane had left Wigan to join Hull City for an undisclosed fee after Hull's long publicised interest in the Iris international.

On 17 January, Wigan travelled to the City of Manchester Stadium to face Manchester City. City were the more controlled side during the first half but wasted their opportunities on goal. Wigan came out more spirited in the second period but conceded an early second-half goal to Pablo Zabaleta. City's good position was rocked only a few minutes later after the dismissal of Richard Dunne for a kick on grounded Wigan striker Amr Zaki. Wigan began to dominate proceedings from this point but could not find the finishing touch and even had Zaki miss an open goal five minutes before time and had a penalty decision ruled against them as City held on for victory to inflict back-to-back defeats on Wigan for the first time since October.

On 21 January, Wigan and Tottenham agreed terms on the transfer of Wilson Palacios for £12,000,000.

On 22 January, Wigan announced the loan signing of Egyptian striker Mido from Middlesbrough on loan for six months, with Wigan's Marlon King moving in the opposite direction.

On 23 January, Emile Heskey agreed terms and signed for Aston Villa in a deal worth £3,500,000.

On 28 January, Wigan hosted Premiership challengers Liverpool at the JJB Stadium. Liverpool began the game strongly and were awarded with a goal on the stroke of half-time by Yossi Benayoun. Wigan performed valiantly throughout the second half and controlled the midfield better than Liverpool and were awarded a penalty six minutes from the end of the game, which was converted by Mido on his debut for Wigan. Hugo Rodallega had a superb chance to win the game later on for Wigan, crashing a free kick against the bar but the game ended level.

On 31 January, Wigan travelled to Villa Park to face Aston Villa. In a game dominated by Aston Villa Wigan's strong defence held the onslaught from Villa out for the whole game

=== February ===
On 2 February, it was announced that Henri Camara would join Stoke City on loan until the end of the season.

== Transfers ==
=== In ===
| Player | From | Fee | Date | Notes |
|---|---|---|---|---|
| (Netherlands) Daniël de Ridder | (England) Birmingham City | Free | 4 July 2008 | |
| (France) Olivier Kapo | (England) Birmingham City | £3,500,000 | 16 July 2008 | |
| (England) Lee Cattermole | (England) Middlesbrough | £3,500,000 | 29 July 2008 | |
| (Ghana) Richard Kingson | Unattached | Free | 16 September 2008 | |
| (Honduras) Maynor Figueroa | (Honduras) Olimpia | Undisclosed | 23 December 2008 | |
| (Colombia) Hugo Rodallega | (Mexico) Necaxa | £4,500,000 | 26 January 2009 | |
| (England) Ben Watson | (England) Crystal Palace | £2,000,000 | 26 January 2009 | |
| (France) Charles N'Zogbia | (England) Newcastle United | Swap^{[A]} | 2 February 2009 | |
| (South Korea) Cho Won-Hee | Unattached | Free | 12 March 2009 | |

=== Out ===
| Player | To | Fee | Date | Notes |
|---|---|---|---|---|
| (Sweden) Andreas Granqvist | (Netherlands) FC Groningen | £600,000 | 9 July 2008 | |
| (Wales) David Cotterill | (England) Sheffield United | Undisclosed | 31 July 2008 | |
| (England) Carlo Nash | (England) Everton | Undisclosed | 1 September 2008 | |
| (England) Luke Ashworth | (England) Leyton Orient | Free | 14 January 2009 | |
| (Republic of Ireland) Kevin Kilbane | (England) Hull City | Undisclosed | 15 January 2009 | |
| (Honduras) Wilson Palacios | (England) Tottenham Hotspur | £12,000,000 | 21 January 2009 | |
| (England) Emile Heskey | (England) Aston Villa | £3,500,000 | 23 January 2009 | |
| (England) Ryan Taylor | (England) Newcastle United | Swap^{[A]} | 2 February 2009 | |

=== Loans in ===
| Player | From | Start date | End date | Notes |
|---|---|---|---|---|
| (Egypt) Amr Zaki | (Egypt) Zamalek | 22 July 2008 | End of season | |
| (Honduras) Maynor Figueroa | (Honduras) Olimpia | 29 July 2008 | 23 December 2008^{[B]} | |
| (Egypt) Mido | (England) Middlesbrough | 23 January 2009 | End of season | |

=== Loans out ===
| Player | To | Start date | End date | Notes |
|---|---|---|---|---|
| (Jamaica) Marlon King | (England) Hull City | 14 August 2008 | January 2009^{[C]} | |
| (England) Luke Ashworth | (England) Leyton Orient | 22 August 2008 | 3 November 2008^{[D]} | |
| (Netherlands) Rachid Bouaouzan | (Netherlands) N.E.C. Nijmegen | 1 September 2008 | End of season | |
| (France) Antoine Sibierski | (England) Norwich City | 1 September 2008 | 18 January 2009 | |
| (England) Lewis Montrose | (England) Cheltenham Town | 24 September 2008 | 23 November 2008^{[E]} | |
| (Republic of Ireland) Craig Mahon | (England) Accrington Stanley | 27 November 2008 | 26 December 2008 | |
| (England) Lewis Montrose | (England) Cheltenham Town | 8 January 2009 | 7 February 2009 | |
| (Jamaica) Marlon King | (England) Middlesbrough | 22 January 2009 | End of season | |
| (Senegal) Henri Camara | (England) Stoke City | 2 February 2009 | End of season | |
| (England) Lewis Montrose | (England) Chesterfield | 26 February 2009 | End of season | |

== Results ==
| Match won | Match drawn | Match lost |

=== Pre-season ===
| Date | Opponent | Result | Score | Home/Away | Scorers | Attendance | Match Report |
|---|---|---|---|---|---|---|---|
| 19 July 2008 | FC St. Veit | Win | 0–3 | Away | Camara 31', Sibierski 60', Brown 83' | 1,033 | |
| 22 July 2008 | Eintracht Frankfurt | Lose | 2–0 | Away | | - | |
| 25 July 2008 | Hannover 96 | Draw | 2–2 | Away | Heskey 17', Scharner 83' | - | |
| 29 July 2008 | Barnsley | Win | 0–6 | Away | King 8', Heskey 18', Valencia 21', De Ridder 48', 51', Brown 85' | 3,668 | |
| 2 August 2008 | Sheffield Wednesday | Win | 2–3 | Away | Heskey 15', Bramble 32', Zaki 90' | 7,067 | |
| 5 August 2008 | Hibernian | Win | 0–1 | Away | Zaki 69' | - | |
| 10 August 2008 | Utrecht | Win | 0–2 | Away | De Ridder 29', Kilbane 60' | - | |

=== Premier League ===
| Matchday | 1 | 2 | 3 | 4 | 5 | 6 | 7 | 8 | 9 | 10 | 11 | 12 | 13 | 14 | 15 | 16 | 17 | 18 | 19 | 20 | 21 | 22 | 23 | 24 | 25 | 26 | 27 | 28 | 29 | 30 | 31 | 32 | 33 | 34 | 35 | 36 | 37 | 38 |
|---|---|---|---|---|---|---|---|---|---|---|---|---|---|---|---|---|---|---|---|---|---|---|---|---|---|---|---|---|---|---|---|---|---|---|---|---|---|---|
| Ground | A | H | A | H | A | H | H | A | H | A | A | H | A | H | H | A | H | H | A | H | A | A | H | A | H | A | A | H | A | H | A | H | A | H | A | H | A | H |
| Result | L | L | W | D | D | W | L | L | L | L | W | D | D | W | W | L | W | W | W | W | L | L | D | D | D | D | L | L | W | W | L | L | L | D | L | L | L | W |
| Position | 14 | 19 | 13 | 12 | 14 | 10 | 13 | 14 | 15 | 18 | 17 | 17 | 16 | 15 | 10 | 11 | 9 | 8 | 7 | 7 | 7 | 7 | 7 | 7 | 7 | 7 | 8 | 9 | 8 | 7 | 8 | 10 | 11 | 11 | 11 | 11 | 12 | 11 |

Source: WorldFootball.com
A = Away; H = Home; W = Win; D = Draw; L = Loss

| Date | Opponent | Result | Score | Home/Away | Scorers | Attendance | Match Report |
|---|---|---|---|---|---|---|---|
| 16 August 2008 | West Ham United | Lose | 2–1 | Away | Zaki 47' | 32,758 | |
| 24 August 2008 | Chelsea | Lose | 0–1 | Home | | 18,139 | |
| 30 August 2008 | Hull City | Win | 0–5 | Away | Ricketts 5' (og), Valencia 13', Zaki 63', 81', Heskey 68' | 24,282 | |
| 13 September 2008 | Sunderland | Draw | 1–1 | Home | Zaki 78' | 18,015 | |
| 21 September 2008 | Tottenham Hotspur | Draw | 0–0 | Away | | 35,808 | |
| 28 September 2008 | Manchester City | Win | 2–1 | Home | Valencia 15', Zaki 33' (pen) | 18,214 | |
| 4 October 2008 | Middlesbrough | Lose | 0–1 | Home | | 16,806 | |
| 18 October 2008 | Liverpool | Lose | 3–2 | Away | Zaki 28', 45' | 43,868 | |
| 26 October 2008 | Aston Villa | Lose | 0–4 | Home | | 20,249 | |
| 29 October 2008 | Fulham | Lose | 2–0 | Away | | 22,500 | |
| 1 November 2008 | Portsmouth | Win | 1–2 | Away | Zaki 45+1' (pen), Heskey 90+2' | 18,416 | |
| 8 November 2008 | Stoke City | Draw | 0–0 | Home | | 15,881 | |
| 15 November 2008 | Newcastle United | Draw | 2–2 | Away | Taylor 3', Bramble 89' | 47,657 | |
| 24 November 2008 | Everton | Win | 1–0 | Home | Camara 51' | 18,344 | |
| 29 November 2008 | West Bromwich Albion | Win | 2–1 | Home | Camara 61', Boyce 87' | 17,054 | |
| 6 December 2008 | Arsenal | Lose | 1–0 | Away | | 59,317 | |
| 13 December 2008 | Blackburn Rovers | Win | 3–0 | Home | Heskey 10', Valencia 12', Cattermole 77' | 18,003 | |
| 26 December 2008 | Newcastle United | Win | 2–1 | Home | Taylor 29', Zaki 73' (pen) | 20,266 | |
| 28 December 2008 | Bolton Wanderers | Win | 1–0 | Away | Zaki 44' (pen) | 23,726 | |
| 11 January 2009 | Tottenham Hotspur | Win | 1–0 | Home | Figueroa 90' | 17,500 | |
| 14 January 2009 | Manchester United | Lose | 1–0 | Away | | 73,917 | |
| 17 January 2009 | Manchester City | Lose | 1–0 | Away | | 41,262 | |
| 28 January 2009 | Liverpool | Draw | 1–1 | Home | Mido 83' (pen) | 21,237 | |
| 31 January 2009 | Aston Villa | Draw | 0–0 | Away | | 41,766 | |
| 7 February 2009 | Fulham | Draw | 0–0 | Home | | 16,499 | |
| 21 February 2009 | Middlesbrough | Draw | 0–0 | Away | | 24,020 | |
| 28 February 2009 | Chelsea | Lose | 2–1 | Away | Kapo 83' | 40,714 | |
| 4 March 2009 | West Ham United | Lose | 0–1 | Home | | 14,169 | |
| 14 March 2009 | Sunderland | Win | 1–2 | Away | Watson 12', N'Zogbia 45+1' | 39,266 | |
| 22 March 2009 | Hull City | Win | 1–0 | Home | Watson 85' | 17,689 | |
| 5 April 2009 | Everton | Lose | 4–0 | Away | | 34,427 | |
| 11 April 2009 | Arsenal | Lose | 1–4 | Home | Mido 18' | 22,954 | |
| 26 April 2009 | Blackburn Rovers | Lose | 2–0 | Away | | 25,019 | |
| 2 May 2009 | Bolton Wanderers | Draw | 0–0 | Home | | 18,655 | |
| 9 May 2009 | West Bromwich Albion | Lose | 3–1 | Away | Rodallega 17' | 24,741 | |
| 13 May 2009 | Manchester United | Lose | 1–2 | Home | Rodallega 28' | 21,286 | |
| 16 May 2009 | Stoke City | Lose | 2–0 | Away | | 25,641 | |
| 24 May 2009 | Portsmouth | Win | 1–0 | Home | Rodallega 26' | 17,696 | |

=== FA Cup ===
| Date | Round | Opponent | Result | Score | Home/Away | Scorers | Attendance | Match Report |
|---|---|---|---|---|---|---|---|---|
| 2 January 2009 | Third round | Tottenham Hotspur | Lose | 3–1 | Away | Camara 87' | 34,040 | |

=== League Cup ===
| Date | Round | Opponent | Result | Score | Home/Away | Scorers | Attendance | Match Report |
|---|---|---|---|---|---|---|---|---|
| 26 August 2008 | Second round | Notts County | Win | 4–0 | Home | Camara 31', 61', Zaki 59', Kupisz 90' | 4,100 | |
| 24 September 2008 | Third round | Ipswich Town | Win | 1–4 | Away | Cattermole 52', Kapo 64', Scharner 70', Camara 90+3' | 13,803 | |
| 11 November 2008 | Fourth round | Arsenal | Lose | 3–0 | Away | | 59,665 | |

== Final league table ==
| Pos | Team | Pld | W | D | L | GF | GA | GD | Pts |
|---|---|---|---|---|---|---|---|---|---|
| 9 | West Ham United | 38 | 14 | 9 | 15 | 42 | 45 | −3 | 51 |
| 10 | Manchester City | 38 | 15 | 5 | 18 | 58 | 50 | +8 | 50 |
| 11 | Wigan Athletic | 38 | 12 | 9 | 17 | 34 | 45 | −11 | 45 |
| 12 | Stoke City | 38 | 12 | 9 | 17 | 38 | 55 | −17 | 45 |
| 13 | Bolton Wanderers | 38 | 11 | 8 | 19 | 41 | 53 | −12 | 41 |

Source: Barclays Premier League
Rules for classification: 1) points; 2) goal difference; 3) number of goals scored.

== Statistics ==
=== Appearances and goals ===
| No. | Pos | Nat | Player | Total | | Premier League | | FA Cup | | League Cup | |
| No. | Pos | Nat | Player | Apps | Goals | Apps | Goals | Apps | Goals | Apps | Goals |
Goalkeepers
| 1 | GK | (England) ENG | Chris Kirkland | 34 | 0 | 32 | 0 | 0 | 0 | 2 | 0 |
| 12 | GK | (England) ENG | Mike Pollitt | 3 | 0 | 3 | 0 | 0 | 0 | 0 | 0 |
| 22 | GK | (Ghana) GHA | Richard Kingson | 5 | 0 | 3+1 | 0 | 1 | 0 | 0 | 0 |
Defenders
| 3 | DF | (Sweden) SWE | Erik Edman | 3 | 0 | 0+2 | 0 | 0+1 | 0 | 0 | 0 |
| 7 | DF | (Austria) AUT | Paul Scharner | 31 | 1 | 27+2 | 0 | 1 | 0 | 1 | 1 |
| 17 | DF | (Barbados) BRB | Emmerson Boyce | 31 | 1 | 26+1 | 1 | 1 | 0 | 3 | 0 |
| 19 | DF | (England) ENG | Titus Bramble | 39 | 1 | 35 | 1 | 1 | 0 | 3 | 0 |
| 25 | DF | (Netherlands) NED | Mario Melchiot | 35 | 0 | 33+1 | 0 | 0 | 0 | 1 | 0 |
| 31 | DF | (Honduras) HON | Maynor Figueroa | 41 | 1 | 38 | 1 | 0+1 | 0 | 2 | 0 |
Midfielders
| 4 | MF | (England) ENG | Lee Cattermole | 35 | 2 | 33 | 1 | 0 | 0 | 2 | 1 |
| 5 | MF | (South Korea) KOR | Cho Won-hee | 1 | 0 | 1 | 0 | 0 | 0 | 0 | 0 |
| 6 | MF | (France) FRA | Antoine Sibierski | 3 | 0 | 0+3 | 0 | 0 | 0 | 0 | 0 |
| 8 | MF | (England) ENG | Ben Watson | 10 | 2 | 6+4 | 2 | 0 | 0 | 0 | 0 |
| 10 | MF | (Wales) WAL | Jason Koumas | 18 | 0 | 5+11 | 0 | 0 | 0 | 1+1 | 0 |
| 11 | MF | (England) ENG | Michael Brown | 28 | 0 | 18+7 | 0 | 1 | 0 | 1+1 | 0 |
| 14 | MF | (France) FRA | Charles N'Zogbia | 13 | 1 | 13 | 1 | 0 | 0 | 0 | 0 |
| 16 | MF | (Ecuador) ECU | Antonio Valencia | 35 | 3 | 31 | 3 | 1 | 0 | 3 | 0 |
| 18 | MF | (Netherlands) NED | Daniël de Ridder | 22 | 0 | 5+13 | 0 | 1 | 0 | 2+1 | 0 |
| 21 | MF | (Poland) POL | Tomasz Cywka | 1 | 0 | 0 | 0 | 0+1 | 0 | 0 | 0 |
| 23 | MF | (France) FRA | Olivier Kapo | 21 | 2 | 10+9 | 1 | 1 | 0 | 1 | 1 |
| 28 | MF | (Poland) POL | Tomasz Kupisz | 1 | 1 | 0 | 0 | 0 | 0 | 0+1 | 1 |
| 29 | MF | (England) ENG | Lewis Montrose | 1 | 0 | 0 | 0 | 0 | 0 | 1 | 0 |
| 38 | MF | (England) ENG | Jon Routledge | 1 | 0 | 0+1 | 0 | 0 | 0 | 0 | 0 |
| 43 | MF | (England) ENG | Callum McManaman | 1 | 0 | 0+1 | 0 | 0 | 0 | 0 | 0 |
Forwards
| 9 | FW | (Egypt) EGY | Mido | 12 | 2 | 10+2 | 2 | 0 | 0 | 0 | 0 |
| 13 | FW | (Egypt) EGY | Amr Zaki | 32 | 11 | 22+7 | 10 | 0 | 0 | 2+1 | 1 |
| 20 | FW | (Colombia) COL | Hugo Rodallega | 15 | 3 | 9+6 | 3 | 0 | 0 | 0 | 0 |
Players transferred out during the season
| 2 | DF | (England) ENG | Ryan Taylor | 12 | 2 | 11+1 | 2 | 0 | 0 | 0 | 0 |
| 5 | MF | (Honduras) HON | Wilson Palacios | 24 | 0 | 21 | 0 | 1 | 0 | 2 | 0 |
| 8 | MF | (Republic of Ireland) IRL | Kevin Kilbane | 13 | 0 | 3+7 | 0 | 1 | 0 | 2 | 0 |
| 9 | FW | (England) ENG | Emile Heskey | 22 | 3 | 20 | 3 | 0 | 0 | 2 | 0 |
| 24 | GK | (England) ENG | Carlo Nash | 1 | 0 | 0 | 0 | 0 | 0 | 1 | 0 |
| 26 | MF | (Netherlands) NED | Rachid Bouaouzan | 1 | 0 | 0 | 0 | 0 | 0 | 0+1 | 0 |
| 27 | FW | (Senegal) SEN | Henri Camara | 21 | 6 | 3+14 | 2 | 1 | 1 | 1+2 | 3 |

== Notes ==
A. Wigan also paid Newcastle a fee of around £6 million.
B. Figueroa initially joined on loan for six months, but was signed permanently before the deal expired.
C. King was initially loaned out for the whole season, but the deal was cancelled early by Hull City.
D. Ashworth was initially loaned out for a month, but the deal was extended.
E. Montrose was initially loaned out for a month, but the deal was extended.
