= 2006 Football League Cup final =

- Event: 2005–06 Football League Cup
Manchester United	Wigan Athletic
4	0
- Date: 26 February 2006
- Venue: Millennium Stadium, Cardiff
- Man of the Match: Wayne Rooney (Manchester United)
- Referee: Alan Wiley (Staffordshire)
- Attendance: 66,866
- Weather: Mostly cloudy 6 °C (43 °F)

The 2006 Football League Cup final also known as the 2006 Carling Cup final for sponsorship reasons, was played between Manchester United and Wigan Athletic on 26 February 2006. Manchester United won the match comfortably, by four goals to nil. Louis Saha and Cristiano Ronaldo both scored one goal, and Wayne Rooney scored twice. For the trophy presentation, the Manchester United players wore special shirts reading "For You Smudge", referring to Alan Smith, who had broken his left leg during a recent FA Cup match against Liverpool. Wigan goalkeeper Mike Pollitt picked up a hamstring injury after just 14 minutes, cutting short a dream cup final for the journeyman player, who started his career with the Red Devils.

== Route to the final ==
Manchester United
Round 3	Manchester United	4–1	Barnet
Round 4	Manchester United	3–1	West Bromwich Albion
Round 5	Birmingham City	1–3	Manchester United
Semi-final (1st leg)	Blackburn Rovers	1–1	Manchester United
Semi-final (2nd leg)	Manchester United	2–1	Blackburn Rovers
	(Man Utd won 3–2 on aggregate)		

Wigan
Round 2	Wigan Athletic	1–0	AFC Bournemouth
Round 3	Wigan Athletic	3–0	Watford
Round 4	Wigan Athletic	1–0	Newcastle United
Round 5	Wigan Athletic	2–0	Bolton Wanderers
Semi-final (1st leg)	Wigan Athletic	1–0	Arsenal
Semi-final (2nd leg)	Arsenal	2–1	Wigan Athletic
	(2–2 on aggregate. Wigan Athletic won on away goals)		

== Match details ==
26 February 2006
15:00

Manchester United	4–0	Wigan Athletic
Rooney 33', 61'; Saha 55'; Ronaldo 59'	Report

Millennium Stadium, Cardiff
Attendance: 66,866
Referee: Alan Wiley (Staffordshire)

Manchester United	Wigan Athletic

GK	19	(Netherlands) Edwin van der Sar
RB	2	(England) Gary Neville (c)
CB	6	(England) Wes Brown		(substituted off) 83'
CB	5	(England) Rio Ferdinand
LB	27	(France) Mikaël Silvestre		(substituted off) 83'
RM	7	(Portugal) Cristiano Ronaldo	(yellow card) 60'	(substituted off) 73'
CM	22	(Republic of Ireland) John O'Shea
CM	11	(Wales) Ryan Giggs
LM	13	(South Korea) Park Ji-sung
SS	8	(England) Wayne Rooney
CF	9	(France) Louis Saha
Substitutes:
GK	1	(United States) Tim Howard
DF	3	(France) Patrice Evra		(substituted on) 83'
DF	15	(Serbia and Montenegro) Nemanja Vidić		(substituted on) 83'
MF	23	(England) Kieran Richardson		(substituted on) 73'
FW	10	(Netherlands) Ruud van Nistelrooy
Manager:
(Scotland) Sir Alex Ferguson

GK	12	(England) Mike Pollitt		(substituted off) 14'
RB	2	(France) Pascal Chimbonda
CB	16	(Netherlands) Arjan de Zeeuw (c)	(yellow card) 45'
CB	6	(Switzerland) Stéphane Henchoz		(substituted off) 62'
LB	26	(England) Leighton Baines
RM	21	(England) Jimmy Bullard
CM	11	(Republic of Ireland) Graham Kavanagh		(substituted off) 72'
CM	19	(Austria) Paul Scharner
LM	20	(Scotland) Gary Teale
CF	7	(Senegal) Henri Camara
CF	30	(Grenada) Jason Roberts
Substitutes:
GK	1	(Australia) John Filan		(substituted on) 14'
DF	4	(England) Matt Jackson
MF	8	(Sweden) Andreas Johansson
MF	23	(Switzerland) Reto Ziegler		(substituted on) 72'
FW	10	(Scotland) Lee McCulloch		(substituted on) 62'
Manager:
(England) Paul Jewell

Match officials

- Assistant referees:
  - John Holbrook (Worcestershire)
  - Paul Norman (Dorset)
- Fourth official: Andy Hall (West Midlands)

Man of the match

- Wayne Rooney (Manchester United)

Match rules

- 90 minutes
- 30 minutes of extra time if necessary
- Penalty shoot-out if scores still level
- Five named substitutes
- Maximum of three substitutions

=== Statistics ===
Statistic	United	Wigan
Total shots	14	16
Shots on target	9	7
Ball possession	46%	54%
Corner kicks	1	5
Fouls committed	11	13
Offsides	3	2
Yellow cards	1	1
Red cards	0	0
