= Tomasz Cywka =

Polish footballer (born 1988)

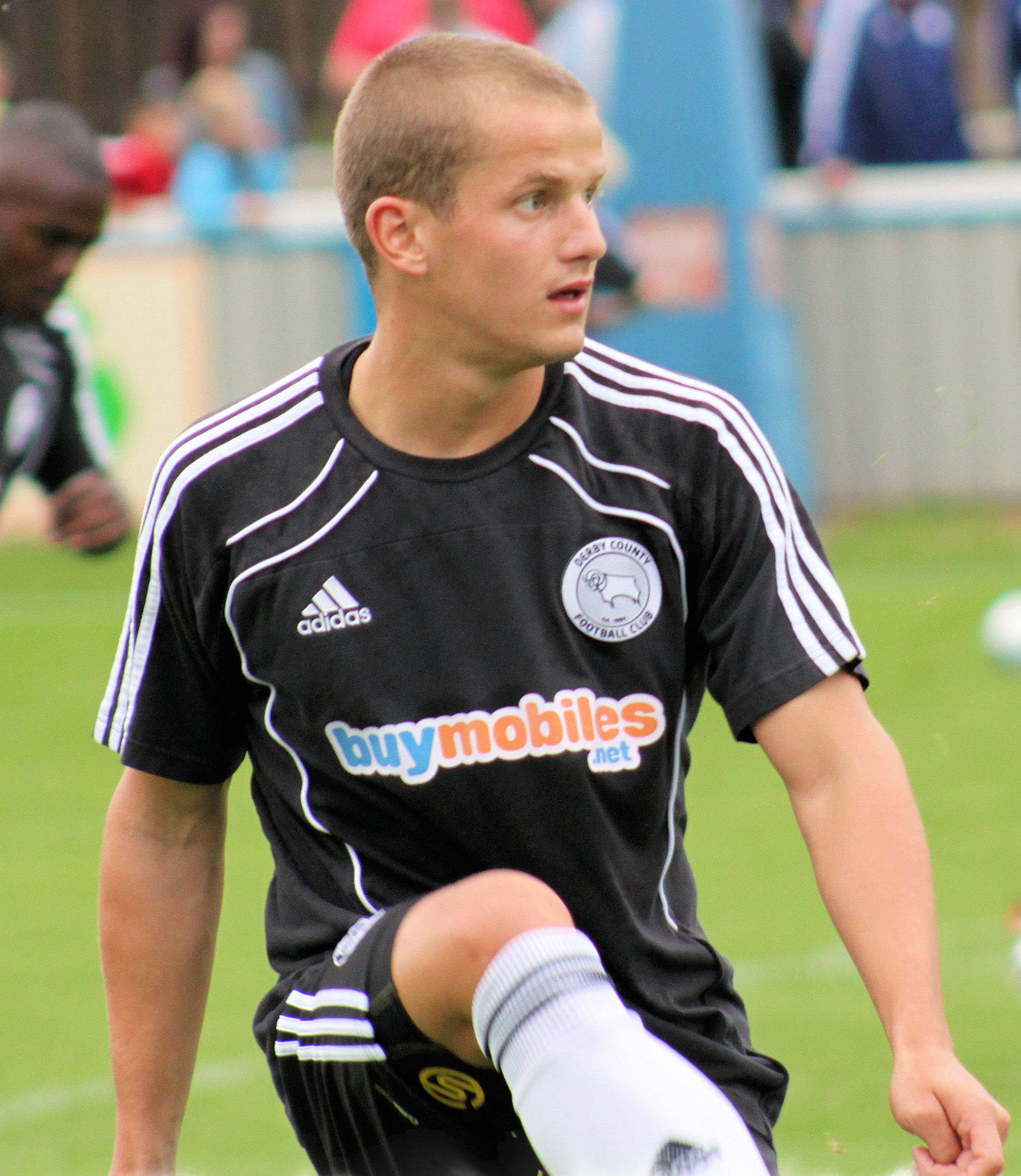
- Cywka training with Derby County in 2011

Personal information
- Full name: Tomasz Wojciech Cywka
- Date of birth: 27 June 1988 (age 38)
- Place of birth: Gliwice, Poland
- Height: 1.80 m (5 ft 11 in)
- Position: Defensive midfielder

Team information
- Current team: Sparta Oborniki
- Number: 4

Youth career
- Polonia Bytom
- 2003–2004: Zantka Chorzów
- 2003–2006: Gwarek Zabrze

Senior career*
Years	Team	Apps	(Gls)
2006–2010	Wigan Athletic	0	(0)
2006	→ Oldham Athletic (loan)	4	(0)
2010	→ Derby County (loan)	5	(0)
2010–2012	Derby County	39	(5)
2012	Reading	4	(0)
2012–2014	Barnsley	59	(9)
2014–2015	Blackpool	6	(1)
2014–2015	→ Rochdale (loan)	3	(0)
2015–2018	Wisła Kraków	79	(0)
2018–2020	Lech Poznań	9	(1)
2018–2020	Lech Poznań II	9	(0)
2020–2022	Chrobry Głogów	48	(2)
2022–2024	Lech Poznań II	52	(3)
2025–2026	Polonia Środa Wielkopolska	13	(0)
2026–	Sparta Oborniki	15	(3)

International career
- Poland U19
	Poland U20	4	(0)
2006–2009	Poland U21	2	(0)
- * Club domestic league appearances and goals as of 09:15, 26 June 2026 (UTC)

Tomasz Wojciech Cywka (Polish pronunciation: [ˈtɔmaʂ ˈt͡sɨfka]; born 27 June 1988) is a Polish professional footballer who plays mainly as a defensive midfielder for V liga Greater Poland club Sparta Oborniki.

He spent most of his career in England, playing for Wigan Athletic, Oldham Athletic, Derby County, Reading, Barnsley, Blackpool and Rochdale.

Cywka played internationally for Poland at under-19, under-20, and under-21 level.

== Club career ==
=== Early career ===
Born in Gliwice, Silesian Voivodeship, Cywka was part of the winning U-19 Gwarek Zabrze team which captured the 2006 Polish U-19 Championship.

=== Wigan Athletic ===
Following a successful week-long trial at Wigan Athletic, Cywka signed a three-year contract in July 2006 transferring him from Gwarek Zabrze to the Premier League side. He made his first appearance in September 2006 as a substitute against Crewe Alexandra in the League Cup.

In October 2006 he moved on loan to League One side Oldham Athletic where he made four substitute appearances.

He made his second appearance for Wigan in an FA Cup match against Tottenham in January 2009, coming on as a substitute in the 74th minute. In February 2009 Steve Bruce suggested that Cywka was on the verge of breaking into the first team, however, the following month Cywka suffered torn knee ligaments which would see him out until the following season.

=== Derby County ===
On 25 March 2010, Cywka joined Championship side Derby County on loan till the end of the season. He made his debut for Derby as a late sub in a loss against Ipswich before starting the final four matches of the season. In April, Derby manager Nigel Clough began talks to extend his stay at Pride Park Stadium into next season. On 25 May, it was announced that he would sign a two-year contract with Derby on a free transfer on 1 July, after turning down Wigan's extension offer due to his desire for first team football.

Cywka appeared in Derby's opening fixture for the 2010–11 season, an away match against Leeds United, in which the Rams won 2–1. His first goal for the club came on Saturday 14 August 2010 in a match which finished 2–1 to the visiting Cardiff City. Cywka suffered a fractured cheekbone in the same match. He quickly returned to action, however, and grabbed this 2nd and 3rd senior goals with a brace in a 4–1 win over Watford on 30 October 2010, which earned him a place in the Championship Team of the Week. Cywka again started against Portsmouth at Pride Park and won a penalty after being fouled in the box, Robbie Savage scored the opener from the spot and the Rams went on to record a 2–0 victory. His 4th goal came in the 3–2 victory over Scunthorpe United, scoring within the first 5 minutes.

On 5 February 2011, Cywka was openly criticised by Derby boss Nigel Clough after his losing of the ball late in the game led to a late equaliser in a 1–1 draw at Portsmouth. Of Cywka, Clough said "He's an extremely inexperienced and not very bright footballer ... he can go back to Wigan or wherever he came from – I'm not really bothered – until he learns the game." These incidents led PFA Chief Gordon Taylor to criticise Clough, saying "It cannot be appropriate to criticise your team in such a way in public. We'll sort things out ... otherwise it looks an untenable situation.". Despite the criticisms after the Portsmouth game Cywka made a further six appearances for the Rams before being ruled out for the remainder of the season with a knee ligament injury.

Cywka found himself out of the side for the start of the 2011–12 season as Derby made their best start to a season for over 100 years. His first league appearance came in the seventh fixture, away at Nottingham Forest, but he was withdrawn after just four minutes when the dismissal of Frank Fielding led to the need for a tactical reshuffle. Three late substitute appearances followed before he earned his second start of the campaign in the twelfth match of the season, away to Reading, when injuries had left Derby with just Cywka and Theo Robinson to choose from amongst the club's strikers. In the event, Cywka scored his first goal of the season in the 75th minute to give Derby a 2–1 lead in a match they eventually drew 2–2. After a succession of poor performances and losing his place in the first team, Cywka was told by Derby manager Nigel Clough in January 2012 that he was free to leave the club on a free transfer. This followed the news that a move to a Polish club had broken down, which later turned out to be Ekstraklasa leaders Śląsk Wrocław.

=== Reading ===
On 26 January 2012, Cywka joined Championship side Reading, on a free transfer until the end of the season, and took squad number 41. He made his début in a 1–0 win over Bristol City, securing the winning penalty. Cywka also featured in the last 20 minutes of a home game against Coventry, impressing with his first touch and dribbling ability. During his time at Reading, Tomasz being awarded a Championship winning medal. On 2 May 2012 Reading announced that Cywka had been released by the club.

=== Barnsley ===
On 6 August 2012, Cywka joined Championship side Barnsley on a one-year deal. He scored his first goal for Barnsley in a 3–1 defeat at Wolverhampton Wanderers on 21 August 2012. His second came in a 1–0 win against Charlton Athletic at The Valley on 20 October 2012. He bagged his third Reds goal in the game with Bristol City, however only scant consolation in a 5–3 defeat. In September he scored a freekick from 40 yards out against Nottingham Forest.

=== Blackpool ===
On 28 July 2014, following an unsuccessful trial at Charlton Athletic, Cywka signed for Blackpool on a one-year deal. He made his debut for the club on 9 August, and scored his first goal in a 2-1 defeat to Blackburn Rovers on 16 August 2014.

On 26 November 2014, Cywka joined Rochdale on loan until 3 January 2015. He played 3 times for Rochdale in the league that season, as they finished in 8th place, their highest-ever league placing.

He was released by Blackpool in May 2015.

=== Return to Poland ===
Cywka returned to Poland in 2015, signing with Wisła Kraków. He played 85 games in a three-year spell at the White Star.

On 13 June 2018, he signed a two-year contract with Ekstraklasa side Lech Poznań. He debuted on 12 July 2018 in 2018–19 UEFA Europa League first qualifying round match against Gandzasar Kapan.

On 29 August 2020, he signed a one-year contract with Chrobry Głogów in the second-tier I liga.

After leaving Chrobry at the end of his contract, he joined Lech Poznań's reserve team on 27 June 2022, signing a one-year deal. He retired from professional football at the end of the 2023–24 season to join Lech's academy coaching staff.

On 11 July 2025, a year later after announcing his retirement, Cywka resumed his career and joined fourth tier side Polonia Środa Wielkopolska. On 11 February 2026, he left the club by mutual consent. Three days later, Cywka joined sixth division side Sparta Oborniki.

== International career ==
Cywka has played for Poland at under-18, under-19, under-20 and under-21 levels.

== Career statistics ==
As of match played 13 June 2026

Appearances and goals by club, season and competition
Club	Season	League			National cup (Note: Includes FA Cup, Polish Cup)		League cup (Note: Includes EFL Cup)		Other		Total	
Club	Season	Division	Apps	Goals	Apps	Goals	Apps	Goals	Apps	Goals	Apps	Goals
Wigan Athletic	2006–07	Premier League	0	0	0	0	1	0	—		1	0
Wigan Athletic	2007–08	Premier League	0	0	0	0	0	0	—		0	0
Wigan Athletic	2008–09	Premier League	0	0	1	0	0	0	—		1	0
Wigan Athletic	2009–10	Premier League	0	0	0	0	0	0	—		0	0
Wigan Athletic	Total		0	0	1	0	1	0	—		2	0
Oldham Athletic	2006–07	League One	4	0	0	0	0	0	1 (Note: Appearance in Football League Trophy)	0	5	0
Derby County (loan)	2009–10	Championship	5	0	0	0	0	0	—		5	0
Derby County	2010–11	Championship	31	4	1	0	1	0	—		33	4
Derby County	2011–12	Championship	8	1	0	0	1	0	—		9	1
Derby County	Total		44	5	1	0	2	0	—		47	5
Reading	2011–12	Championship	4	0	0	0	0	0	—		4	0
Barnsley	2012–13	Championship	29	5	2	0	2	0	—		33	5
Barnsley	2013–14	Championship	30	4	1	0	2	0	—		33	4
Barnsley	Total		59	9	3	0	4	0	—		66	9
Blackpool	2014–15	Championship	6	1	0	0	1	0	—		7	1
Rochdale	2014–15	League One	3	0	2	0	0	0	—		5	0
Wisła Kraków	2015–16	Ekstraklasa	27	0	1	0	—		—		28	0
Wisła Kraków	2016–17	Ekstraklasa	25	0	3	0	—		—		28	0
Wisła Kraków	2017–18	Ekstraklasa	27	0	2	0	—		—		29	0
Wisła Kraków	Total		79	0	6	0	—		—		85	0
Lech Poznań	2018–19	Ekstraklasa	9	1	1	0	—		6 (Note: Appearances in UEFA Europa League)	1	16	2
Lech Poznań	2019–20	Ekstraklasa	0	0	1	0	—		—		1	0
Lech Poznań	Total		9	1	2	0	—		6	1	17	2
Lech Poznań II	2018–19	III liga, group II	1	0	—		—		—		1	0
Lech Poznań II	2019–20	II liga	8	0	—		—		—		8	0
Lech Poznań II	Total		9	0	—		—		—		9	0
Chrobry Głogów	2020–21	I liga	29	1	0	0	—		—		29	1
Chrobry Głogów	2021–22	I liga	19	1	1	0	—		—		20	1
Chrobry Głogów	Total		48	2	1	0	—		—		49	2
Lech Poznań II	2022–23	II liga	30	3	1	1	—		—		31	4
Lech Poznań II	2023–24	II liga	22	0	0	0	—		—		22	0
Lech Poznań II	Total		52	3	1	1	—		—		53	4
Polonia Środa Wielkopolska	2025–26	III liga, group II	13	0	1	0	—		—		14	0
Sparta Oborniki	2025–26	V liga Greater Poland I	15	3	—		—		—		15	3
Career total			345	24	18	1	8	0	7	1	378	26

== Honours ==
Reading

- Football League Championship: 2011–12

Lech Poznań II

- III liga, group II: 2018–19
