= Paul Scharner =

Austrian retired footballer (born 1980)

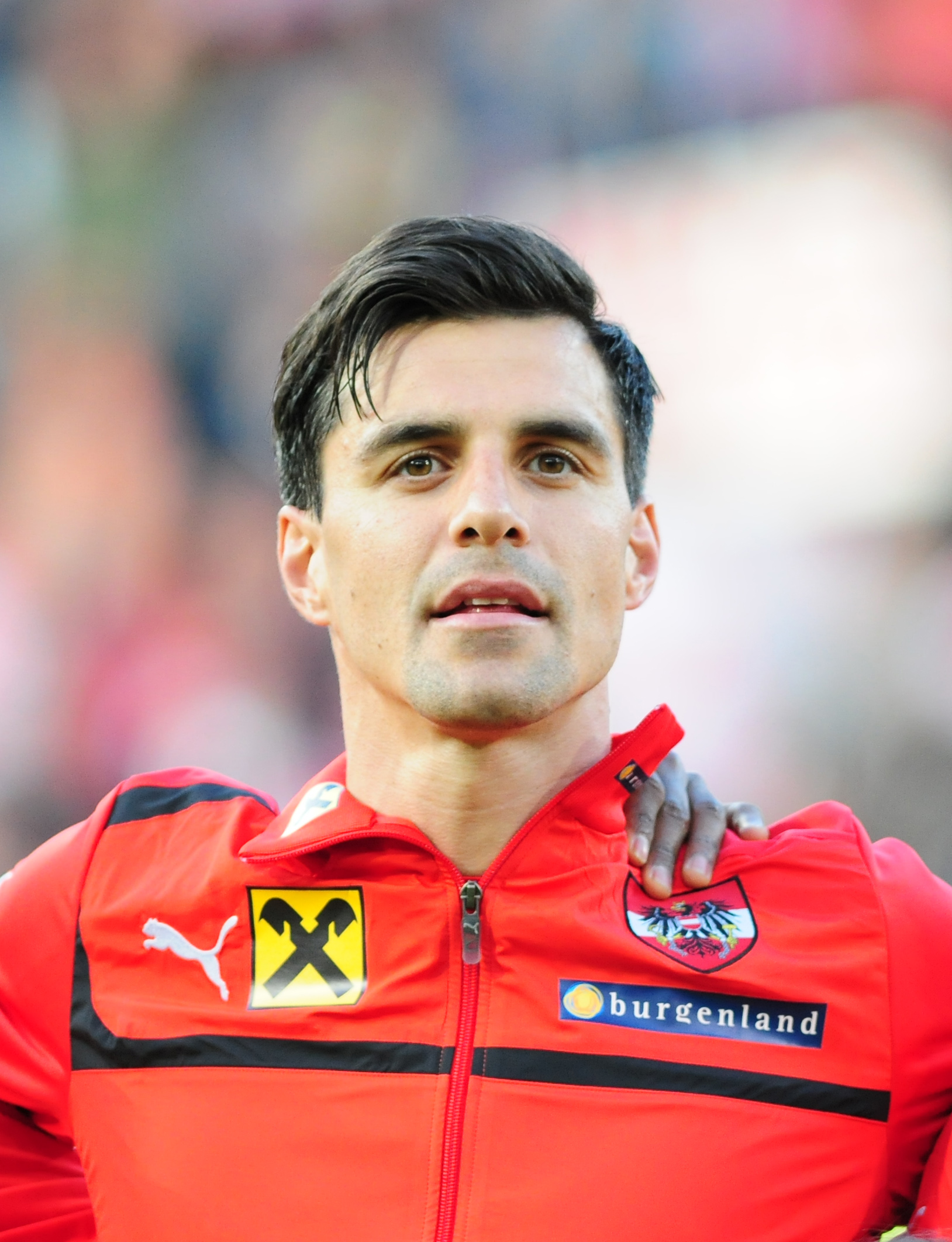
- Scharner with Austria in 2012.

Personal information
- Full name: Paul Josef Herbert Scharner
- Date of birth: 11 March 1980 (age 46)
- Place of birth: Scheibbs, Austria
- Positions: Defender; midfielder

Youth career
- 1987–1993: SVG Purgstall
- 1993–1996: VSE St. Pölten
- 1996–1998: Austria Wien

Senior career*
Years	Team	Apps	(Gls)
1999–2003	Austria Wien	84	(3)
2001	→ SG Untersiebenbrunn (loan)	16	(5)
2004	SV Salzburg	18	(3)
2004–2006	SK Brann	32	(7)
2006–2010	Wigan Athletic	145	(14)
2010–2012	West Bromwich Albion	62	(7)
2012–2013	Hamburger SV	4	(0)
2012	Hamburger SV II	2	(1)
2013	→ Wigan Athletic (loan)	14	(0)
Total		377	(40)

International career
2000–2001	Austria U21	12	(0)
2002–2012	Austria	40	(0)
- * Club domestic league appearances and goals

Paul Josef Herbert Scharner (born 11 March 1980) is an Austrian retired footballer who played as a defender and midfielder.

Scharner started his professional career with Austrian Bundesliga sides Austria Wien and SV Salzburg, before moving to Norwegian Tippeligaen in late 2004, starting for SK Brann. In January 2006, he entered the Premier League where he played for over six years, playing for Wigan Athletic and West Bromwich Albion, respectively. After a short time as a free agent, he transferred to Bundesliga veteran club Hamburger SV in August 2012, before returning to Wigan Athletic on loan in January 2013 - winning the FA Cup. He announced his retirement, at age 33, in September 2013.

== Early life and youth career ==
Born in Scheibbs, Scharner grew up in Purgstall an der Erlauf, where he also started his playing career with local site SVG Purgstall at the age of seven, playing for the club's U-8 team. He stayed with the club until 1993, when he transferred to FCN St. Pölten, which he left in 1996 for Austria Wien, the club where he would receive his first professional contract in 1999. He played for their U-17 and U-18 and later for the club's amateurs, while also getting vocational education in the field of electrical engineering.

== Professional career ==
=== Austria Wien ===
After rising through the youth ranks of the club and playing for the U-17, U-18 and amateur squads, he made his debut for the first team as a substitute on the third of March in 1998 in a friendly match against Hellas Kagran, which Austria Wien won 5:1 and received his first professional contract in May 1999.

1998/1999 and 1999/2000 seasons Before receiving his first professional contract with the club, he again took part in two friendly matches in February 1999, before making his debut in the Austrian Bundesliga on 24 April in a home game against SV Ried, which the Austria won 3:0. In May, he took part in three games for the remainder of the season, playing against Salzburg, GAK and Innsbruck, respectively. The latter also marked his first time in the starting line-up and his first yellow card.

Similar to the last season, Scharner played the first team only in friendly matches at the beginning, before returning to the Bundesliga in the eleventh round on 11 September against GAK as a substitute, in mid October against SW Bregenz as a time stoppage and in late November against LASK Linz. In total he made twelve appearances in the league, nine of which as a starter, while receiving three yellow cards. He made his ÖFB-Cup debut in the second round in late October against SV Würmla and returned for four other matches, while being crucial for the loss against SV Salzburg by receiving a second yellow card in the 23rd minute of play. He scored his first two goals for the Austria in a friendly match against Wiener Neudorf in February.

2000/2001 and 2001/2002 seasons His first matches in the new season also marked his debut on the international stage, playing four matches in the UEFA Intertoto Cup, competing with Nea Salamis Famagusta FC and Ceahlăul Piatra Neamţ, respectively. That season, he made only one appearance in the ÖFB-Cup, in the second round against Wiener Neustadt. In the league, he firstly played in the ninth round against Bregenz, but did not become a part of the team again until the 16th round, but played every game until the 23rd round then. After that, his appearances became fewer until the end of the season. He collected a total of three yellow cards that season, playing 14 games.

To further develop his skills and to give him more minutes, Scharner was loaned to then-Austria affiliate club SG Untersiebenbrunn in the Erste Liga from July to October 2001, where he scored five goals in 16 league matches and also played in the ÖFB-Cup. He returned to his club in November and started getting minutes by the end of the month, playing against Rapid Wien, SV Salzburg and FC Kärnten. In the second half of the season he developed himself as a starter, seeing the kick-off in twelve of his 13 games, while seeing four yellow cards that season. He made his first goal for Austria Wien in a professional competition, opening the scoring in a Bundesliga match against Sturm Graz on 30 March. His strong away round also brought him into the Austria national football team, debuting in a 0:0 against Cameroon on 17 April 2002.

2002/2003 and 2003/2004 seasons After having emerged as a regular starter in the second half of the previous season, he played 29 league games this season, starting 22 of them and seeing eight yellow cards. He scored his only league goal that season in a home game against GAK. He played every cup game starting from the 1/8 finale, seeing one yellow card. Austria also competed in the UEFA Cup, playing against Shakhtar Donetsk, sweeping them 5:1 in the first game and against Porto in the second round, both games were lost. His breakthrough season also marked his most successful with the club, as Austria won the Bundesliga, the ÖFB-Cup and the Austrian Supercup.

Scharner played nine league games for Austria Wien the next season, scoring one goal and receiving three yellow cards until September, as well as competing in the UEFA Champions League qualification against Olympique Marseille, losing the home game and tying in the away game, which led to an UEFA Cup match against Borussia Dortmund, which was also lost. He was kicked from the team in mid October, after then-coach Joachim Löw intended to substitute him as a right midfielder, a position he did not like to play. After refusing his substitution and later stating: "The coach and I discussed where I can help the team the most, but the coach always uses me elsewhere. I already played on seven different positions. But I'm continuing my path." he was suspended from Austria and was forced to look for a new team.

=== SV Salzburg ===
Having no future with Austria Wien, Scharner was forced to look for a new team and ended up playing for SV Austria Salzburg, who were at that time fighting against relegation, signing a contract until June 2006.

After being kicked by Joachim Löw, Scharner transferred to relegation battler SV Salzburg in January to help them for the rest of the season. He made a total of 13 league games for Salzburg that season, 4 of which were won and three tied, scoring two goals, against Wacker Mödling and Bregenz, respectively. He saw his first yellow/red card in a 3:2 win against Kärnten, the same site that kicked Salzburg out of the 1/8 finale in the ÖFB-Cup, sweeping them 4:0. He collected a total of five yellow cards that season. The team managed to avoid relegation at the end of the season.

Although the relegation was avoided last season, Scharner surprisingly pressed a transfer to SK Brann shortly before the closure of the transfer window, leaving Salzburg early in the season. In his short stint with Salzburg that season, Scharner made a total of five league matches, scoring one goal against Bregenz and receiving one yellow and one yellow/red card.

=== SK Brann ===
After avoiding relegation with Salzburg, Scharner was expected to fulfill his contract, but surprisingly pressed a transfer to Norwegian Tippeligaen club SK Brann on the last day of the summer transfer period. He signed a 2.5-year contract.

Having transferred to Brann late in the season, Scharner made only a few games for his new club, scoring one goal. Brann won the Norwegian Cup that season, thus qualifying for the UEFA Cup qualification, where they overcame AC Allianssi, but lost both games against Lokomotiv Moscow the next round.

The following year, he developed himself into a starter for the Norwegian side, playing 29 games while scoring five goals and receiving four yellow cards. When he left the club after the 2005 season, he had played 32 league matches, scoring seven goals. Scharner was elected Brann's Player of the Year in 2005.

=== Wigan Athletic ===
After finishing the 2005 season with SK Brann, Scharner signed a 3.5-year deal with Wigan Athletic on 22 December 2005, and joined the squad after the holidays. Wigan agreed to pay a fee of £2,500,000 (€3,700,000, 29,500,000 NOK), making it the biggest transfer in Brann's history.

Scharner joined Wigan for the second half of the 2005–06 season. In his first match for Wigan, Scharner scored the winning goal against Arsenal in the League Cup at the JJB Stadium. He went on to start in the final for Wigan that season, a 4–0 defeat to Manchester United. He scored his first Premier League goal in the 24th round in a 1–1 draw with Everton. He quickly emerged as a starter, playing all games from the 22nd round onwards, scoring three goals while receiving five yellow cards.

He continued his leading role the next season, this time Wigan were battling relegation . He started for much of the first half of the season, scoring two goals in an away-tie against Everton, receiving five yellow cards in that half of the season. Injury kept him off the field for much of the second half, returning not until the 30th round in a match against Fulham. he collected four yellow cards this time around and scored one goal in the last game of the season, a 1–2 away-win against Sheffield United. This one goal proved to be crucial that season, as his performance in the game safed Wigan from relegation at the final day of play, sending their opponent to The Championship instead, by a goal difference of just one.

The 2007–08 season saw Wigan battling relegation once again. Again, Paul Scharner was a vital part of the team, starting in almost every game of the season, while scoring four goals and receiving six yellow cards. He scored his first goal of the season in the fourth round against West Ham United. He helped his team with a goal in the third round of the FA Cup against Sunderland but Wigan lost to Chelsea in the next round. Wigan finished the season on the 13th place, having earned 40 points, while Scharner was elected Wigan's player of the year.

Aside from reaching the third round in the FA Cup and the fourth in the League Cup, Scharner made a total of 27 league games the following season, scoring no goals while receiving three yellow cards, lifting Wigan Athletic to a solid eleventh place, having earned 45 points. On 22 March 2009, he became the first Wigan player to play 100 Premier League games, playing an outstanding 77 minutes in a 1–0 win at home to Hull City.

In his final season for Wigan, he played in all 38 league games, scoring four goals while receiving six yellow cards. Wigan lost to Blackpool in the second round of the League Cup and to Notts County in the fourth round of the FA Cup. On 30 August 2009, he scored his first goal of the season against Everton. After a 5–0 defeat to Manchester United, Wigan manager Roberto Martínez preferred to use Scharner in an attacking midfield role. Scharner was a part of the team in November 2009 that suffered a historical 9–1 loss at the hands of Tottenham, scoring Wigan's only goal in the fixture although, when controlling the ball prior to shooting, he appeared to handle it. On 19 April 2010, he announced his decision to leave Wigan Athletic at the end of the 2009–10 season.

=== West Bromwich Albion ===
On 30 August 2010, Scharner joined newly promoted Premier League side West Bromwich Albion on a two-year deal, having been a free agent since his release by Wigan. Teammate James Morrison has since praised his performances, saying that although Scharner is "a weirdo", has made a positive impact on the team. He made the switch to West Brom with the intent of no longer playing in central defence when manager Roberto Di Matteo told him he will be used as a midfielder.

After his league debut in a 1–1 draw against Tottenham Hotspur in the fourth round, West Brom went on a five-game unbeaten run, including a win against Arsenal and a draw against Manchester United. He scored his first goal for West Brom in a 4-1 away win against Everton, helping Albion to their first league win at Goodison Park since 1979. He received seven yellow cards and was sent off once that season, while scoring four goals. His club finished the season in eleventh place with 47 points.

The next season, his final year in the Premier League, Scharner played 29 games for West Brom, mostly as a starter. He scored three goals while receiving six yellow cards. His team reached the third round in the League Cup, losing to Everton. On 22 October 2011, Scharner scored a historic winner in a 2-1 away win against rivals Aston Villa, which was Albion's first league win at Villa Park since 1979. West Brom earned 47 points again, finishing in tenth place. After not meeting a clause in his contract that would trigger a twelve-month extension, Scharner announced on 8 May that he would be leaving West Brom in the summer and search for a new challenge.

=== Hamburger SV ===
After his contract with West Bromwich Albion ended, Scharner was linked to Eintracht Frankfurt but after absolving a week of training there, Scharner was not signed by Frankfurt and instead moved to Bundesliga veteran club Hamburger SV, where he received a two-year contract. When talking to coach Thorsten Fink for the first time prior to signing his contract, he prepared a list of ten questions he wanted to ask his new coach, a fact that surprised and impressed Fink.

=== Return to Wigan ===
After four senior Bundesliga appearances in the 2012–13 season with Hamburg, Scharner was signed on loan by former club Wigan Athletic, on transfer deadline day. He helped the club to reach the FA Cup final after they beat Millwall 2–0 at Wembley. Scharner said it was his "best moment in football". On 11 May 2013 Scharner won the FA Cup with Wigan, playing the whole game in a 1–0 upset win against Manchester City. Only three days later, Wigan were relegated from the Premier League following a 4–1 defeat against Arsenal.

== International career ==
Scharner started playing for Austria at the under-21 level, debuting against Spain in 2000. He played a total of twelve matches on that level, scoring no goals.

Scharner debuted for the Austria national football team in a 0–0 draw with Cameroon on 17 April 2002. He played the qualification round for the 2006 FIFA World Cup but Austria failed to qualify. Scharner retired in August 2006 after a 2–1 defeat to Hungary, criticising "unprofessional structures" within the ÖFB. Coach Josef Hickersberger banned him from the team and stated that he will never play for Austria as long as he manages it. He tried to make a comeback in 2008, when Austria co-hosted the 2008 UEFA European Championship but Hickersberger remained hard, not picking him. After Hickersberger was replaced, his successor Karel Brückner started nominating him again after the tournament and he was even promoted to team captain from 2009 to 2010. After then-coach Dietmar Constantini was fired, he tried to become player-coach but this was rejected. In August 2012 he was banned from the team permanently after leaving the team hotel when coach Marcel Koller refused to give him a leading role in the upcoming 2014 FIFA World Cup qualification. The chairmanship of the ÖFB has stated that he will never play for Austria again, no matter who coaches it. He played a total of 40 matches, scoring no goals.

== Style of play ==
Scharner usually serves as a central defender or midfielder. Nevertheless, he is noted for his positional flexibility, having played every outfield position for Wigan except left back. This versatility was already evident early in his career. While at Austria Wien his former coach Joachim Löw played him in various positions and although, over his career he has performed well whatever position he has been selected to play, he has let it be known he prefers playing in a defensive position. His former coach at West Brom, Roberto Di Matteo, describes Scharner as follows: "Paul is a powerful, competitive player who is good on the ball, excellent in both boxes, can play in numerous positions and also chips in with goals."

Another feature of his play is his great professionalism and focus, planning his training, goals and achievements meticulously on flip-charts. At the age of twelve, he had controlled his nutrition and at fifteen he had trained with Valentin Hobel; a personal mental coach. He practices his mental and autogenous training with great discipline, as he regards it as fundamental for his success as a professional. Scharner believes, "You can train your mind as well as your body." His HSV coach Thorsten Fink said, regarding his leadership abilities: "Paul is the type who never hides, who always leads the way and who will be there for the team especially in close situations."

== Image ==
Scharner's disputes with coaches at both club and international level have brought him media attention: a 2012 feature in Österreich described him as "still an awkward customer" (German: Er ist und bleibt ein Querkopf). In 2003, his refusal to come on as a substitute to play on the right of midfield led Austria Wien coach Joachim Löw to suspend him from the team. After Scharner announced his retirement from international football in 2006, citing the ÖFB's lack of professionalism, national coach Josef Hickersberger said that as long as he was in charge, Scharner would not play for Austria again. He made a comeback under Dietmar Constantini, but criticised the retention of Constantini as coach after failure to qualify for Euro 2012, proposing himself as a better alternative. His final breach with the national team came in August 2012, when the ÖFB banned him permanently for leaving the team hotel after unsuccessfully demanding a guaranteed key role throughout the World Cup qualifiers and publicly criticising coach Marcel Koller.

In Norway he was affectionately given the nickname fussballgott (i.e. "football-god"), and called "a cross-over between Franz Beckenbauer and Norman Hunter". Although claimed to be an enfant terrible, he was lauded for having an ability of self-examination, and for being "a leading figure, an idol and a resourceful member of the team". In England, he is remembered largely for his professionalism, focus and his energetic performances, as well as his close relationship and identification with the fans of his former teams.

He is also known for his various haircuts, cutting and dying his hair in a multitude of fashions and colours.

== Personal life ==
Paul Scharner is married to Marlene and has three sons: Constantin, Benedict and Paul Jr. He has received vocational education in the field of electrical engineering and lists skiing, reading, motorcycling and billiards as his personal interests.

== Career statistics ==
=== Club ===
As of 19 May 2013.

Appearances and goals by club, season and competition
Club	Season	League			National Cup		League Cup		Europe		Other		Total	
Club	Season	Division	Apps	Goals	Apps	Goals	Apps	Goals	Apps	Goals	Apps	Goals	Apps	Goals
Austria Wien	1998–99	Austrian Bundesliga	4	0	0	0	—		—		—		4	0
Austria Wien	1999–2000	Austrian Bundesliga	12	0	5	0	—		—		—		17	0
Austria Wien	2000–01	Austrian Bundesliga	14	0	0	0	—		4	0	—		18	0
Austria Wien	2001–02	Austrian Bundesliga	16	1	0	0	—		—		—		16	1
Austria Wien	2002–03	Austrian Bundesliga	28	1	4	0	—		4	0	1	0	33	1
Austria Wien	2003–04	Austrian Bundesliga	9	1	0	0	—		3	0	—		12	1
Austria Wien	Total		83	3	9	0	—		11	0	1	0	104	3
SG Untersiebenbrunn (loan)	2001–02	Erste Liga	16	5	1	0	—		—		—		17	5
SV Salzburg	2003–04	Austrian Bundesliga	13	2	1	0	—		—		—		14	2
SV Salzburg	2004–05	Austrian Bundesliga	5	1	0	0	—		—		—		5	1
SV Salzburg	Total		18	3	1	0	—		—		—		19	3
SK Brann	2004	Tippeligaen	7	1	0	0	—		—		—		7	1
SK Brann	2005	Tippeligaen	25	6	0	0	—		4	0			29	6
SK Brann	Total		32	7	0	0	—		4	0			36	7
Wigan Athletic	2005–06	Premier League	16	3	0	0	3	1	—		—		19	4
Wigan Athletic	2006–07	Premier League	25	3	0	0	0	0	—		—		25	3
Wigan Athletic	2007–08	Premier League	37	4	2	1	0	0	—		—		39	5
Wigan Athletic	2008–09	Premier League	29	0	1	0	1	1	—		—		31	1
Wigan Athletic	2009–10	Premier League	38	4	1	0	1	0	—		—		40	4
Wigan Athletic	Total		145	14	4	1	5	2	—		—		153	17
West Bromwich Albion	2010–11	Premier League	33	4	1	0	0	0	—		—		34	4
West Bromwich Albion	2011–12	Premier League	29	3	0	0	1	0	—		—		30	3
West Bromwich Albion	Total		62	7	1	0	1	0	—		—		64	7
Hamburger SV	2012–13	Bundesliga	4	0	0	0	—		—		—		4	0
Wigan Athletic (loan)	2012–13	Premier League	14	0	4	0	—		—		—		18	0
Career total			361	38	20	1	6	2	15	0	1	0	412	41

=== International ===
Statistics as of 19 August 2012.

Austria U-21
Year	Apps	Goals
2000	6	0
2001	6	0
Total	12	0

Austria
Year	Apps	Goals
2002	4	0
2003	2	0
2004	1	0
2005	2	0
2006	3	0
2008	2	0
2009	8	0
2010	4	0
2011	5	0
2012	2	0
Total	40	0

== Honours ==
Austria Wien

- Austrian Bundesliga: 2002–03
- Austrian Cup: 2002–03
- Austrian Supercup: 2003

SK Brann

- Norwegian Cup: 2004

Wigan Athletic

- FA Cup: 2012–13
- Football League Cup runner-up: 2005–06

Individual

- SK Brann's Player of the Year: 2005
- Wigan Athletic's Player of the Year: 2008
