= John Filan =

Australian soccer player (born 1970)

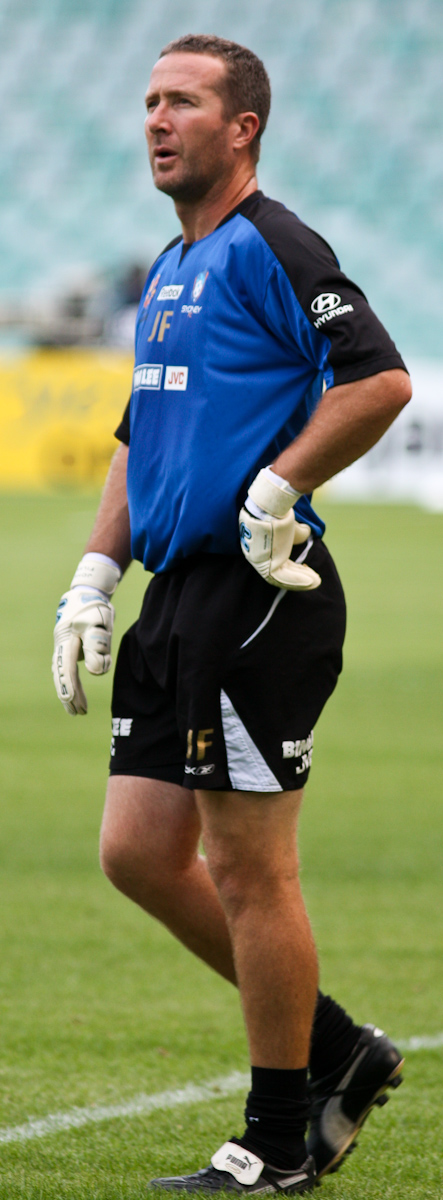
- Filan warming-up with Sydney FC

Personal information
- Full name: John Richard Filan
- Date of birth: 8 February 1970 (age 56)
- Place of birth: Sydney, New South Wales, Australia
- Height: 1.88 m (6 ft 2 in)
- Position: Goalkeeper

Senior career*
Years	Team	Apps	(Gls)
1989–1991	St. George Saints	52	(0)
1991–1992	Wollongong Wolves	23	(0)
1992	St. George Saints	0	(0)
1992–1993	Wollongong Wolves	6	(0)
1993–1995	Cambridge United	68	(0)
1995	→ Nottingham Forest (loan)	0	(0)
1995–1997	Coventry City	16	(0)
1997–2001	Blackburn Rovers	64	(0)
2001–2007	Wigan Athletic	184	(0)
2006	→ Doncaster Rovers (loan)	3	(0)
2008	Sydney FC	0	(0)
Total		416	(0)

International career
1990–1992	Australia U23	14	(0)
1992–1997	Australia	2	(0)
- * Club domestic league appearances and goals

John Richard Filan (born 8 February 1970) is an Australian football coach and former professional player.

As a player, he was a goalkeeper from 1989 until 2008 and notably played in the Premier League for Coventry City, Blackburn Rovers and Wigan Athletic, having also been contracted without playing for Nottingham Forest in England's top division. He also played in the Football League for Cambridge United and Doncaster Rovers, and in his native country for St. George Saints, Wollongong Wolves and Sydney FC. He was capped two times by Australia.

Following retirement, Filan has worked as a coach and held a role with Sydney FC before a spell as assistant manager with both Macclesfield Town and Shrewsbury Town.

== Early life ==
John Richard Filan was born on 8 February 1970 in Sydney, New South Wales.

== Club career ==
=== Early career ===
Filan began his career playing for St. George Saints and Wollongong Wolves in the old National Soccer League in Australia. He trialled with a number of clubs in England, including Southampton, before joining Cambridge United in 1993 for a fee of £40,000.

=== Coventry City ===
In March 1995, Filan signed for Coventry City for a fee of £300,000. Initially third-choice goalkeeper at the club, he was handed his debut towards the end of the 1994–95 season when first choice keeper Steve Ogrizovic broke his leg, and backup Jonathan Gould was dropped following a poor performance. He retained his place in the starting lineup until Ogrizovic returned from his injury in November 1995.

=== Blackburn Rovers ===
Filan moved on to Blackburn Rovers in 1997, for a fee of £700,000. In August 1997, he suffered a broken arm in a 7–1 win against Sheffield Wednesday, an injury which kept him out of action for most of the 1997–98 season. He was relegated with Blackburn during the 1998–99 season, but received the club's Player of the Year award in recognition of his individual performances. He was replaced as first choice goalkeeper in November 2000, following the arrival of Brad Friedel.

=== Wigan Athletic ===
He joined Wigan Athletic in December 2001 for £600,000. He played all 46 league games in Wigan's Second Division-winning season in 2002–03, which included a run of eight consecutive clean sheets, setting a club record. He was an ever-present again in 2004–05 when the club won promotion to the Premier League, and was awarded a new contract which kept him at the club until 2007. Between his debut and the end of the 2004–05 season, Filan had missed only one league match for the club – a fixture against Wimbledon in April 2004 due to suspension.

He was injured at the start of the 2005–06 season, with Wigan's new signing Mike Pollitt taking his place in the side. He appeared as a substitute for Wigan in the 2006 Football League Cup Final when Pollitt had to come off early in the first half with an injury. In 2006–07, there was further competition in goal following the arrival of Chris Kirkland, and Filan was loaned out to Doncaster Rovers. He returned to the Wigan starting lineup in February 2007 following injuries to both Kirkland and Pollitt, notably saving a Nolberto Solano penalty in a 1–0 win over Newcastle United. On 27 February 2007, he announced that he would be leaving the club at the end of the season, as he was returning home to Australia.

== International career ==
Filan was a member of the Australian team that competed at the 1992 Summer Olympics in Barcelona and finished in fourth place. As he has an Irish passport through his ancestry, he once sought to play international football for Ireland. However, FIFA ruled against it in February 1999 because he had played for the Australian Olympic team.

== Coaching career ==
Filan returned to Australia in semi-retirement, resettling in his home town of Sydney. In August 2007 agreed terms with A-League side Sydney FC as backup to Clint Bolton, however the deal fell through citing outside issues. He eventually joined the club a year later as a goalkeeping coach.

He later returned to England, and in 2014 he was appointed as an assistant coach of the under-21 team at his former club Blackburn Rovers.

Filan was appointed as assistant manager to John Askey at League One side Shrewsbury Town in June 2018, having previously worked with Askey during his managerial tenure at Macclesfield Town. This role lasted only five months, with the whole management team departing after only four wins in seventeen league matches.

== Career statistics ==
=== International ===
Appearances and goals by national team and year
National team	Year	Apps	Goals
Australia	1992	1	0
Australia	1993	0	0
Australia	1994	0	0
Australia	1995	0	0
Australia	1996	0	0
Australia	1997	1	0
Total		2	0

== Honours ==
Blackburn Rovers

- Football League First Division runner-up: 2000–01

Wigan Athletic

- Football League Championship runner-up: 2004–05
- Football League Second Division: 2002–03
- Football League Cup runner-up: 2005–06

Individual

- PFA Team of the Year: 2002–03 Second Division
