= Arjan de Zeeuw =

Dutch footballer (born 1970)

Personal information
- Full name: Adrianus Johannes de Zeeuw
- Date of birth: 16 April 1970 (age 56)
- Place of birth: Castricum, Netherlands
- Height: 6 ft 1 in (1.85 m)
- Position: Centre back

Youth career
- Vitesse '22

Senior career*
Years	Team	Apps	(Gls)
1992–1995	Telstar	102	(5)
1995–1999	Barnsley	138	(7)
1999–2002	Wigan Athletic	130	(6)
2002–2005	Portsmouth	106	(5)
2005–2007	Wigan Athletic	52	(0)
2007–2008	Coventry City	17	(0)
2008–2009	ADO '20	12	(0)
Total		557	(23)
- * Club domestic league appearances and goals

Adrianus Johannes "Arjan" de Zeeuw (born 16 April 1970) is a Dutch former professional footballer who played as a centre-back.

Having begun his career with Telstar before going on to spend the bulk of his career in England. He notably played in the Premier League for both Barnsley and Portsmouth and was part of teams promotions to the top flight in 1997 and 2003. He also played top flight football for Wigan Athletic during his second spell with the club, as well as playing in the Football League for Coventry City. He retired in 2009 following a brief spell back in the Netherlands with ADO '20.

== Club career ==
Born in Castricum, North Holland, De Zeeuw started his career at Vitesse '22 in the Dutch amateur leagues, and studied for a degree in medical science whilst playing for the club. At the age of 22, he turned professional and signed for Telstar in the Eerste Divisie. In 1995, he considered quitting football after he felt Telstar had priced him out of a move to Eredivisie side Utrecht, but decided to stay with the club for one more year.

De Zeeuw was approached by Barnsley later that year, who signed him for a fee of £250,000 during the 1995–96 season. In December 1995, he scored his first goal in English football in a 2–2 draw against Ipswich Town. He was a key player in the side that won promotion to the Premier League in the 1996–97 season. The club were relegated the following year, and it appeared that De Zeeuw was set to leave the club in the summer after turning down a new contract, but was later persuaded by new manager John Hendrie to sign a one-year deal. When his contract expired at the end of the 1998–99 season, he moved to Wigan Athletic.

At Wigan he soon became a vital team member, proving to be highly dependable at the back, and received the club's Player of the Year award in 2001 and 2002. His contract with Wigan expired in the summer of 2002, and the following season, he moved on a free transfer to Portsmouth. He was an integral part of the Portsmouth squad that claimed the First Division championship.

He continued to perform to high standards as Portsmouth played well in their debut FA Premier League season, and was recognised by the fans who voted him Portsmouth Player of the Year. He was rewarded with the captaincy for the 2004–05 season, following Teddy Sheringham's departure to West Ham United, and led the team to stave off relegation following the departure of manager Harry Redknapp.

In the summer 2005, after falling out with then-Portsmouth manager Alain Perrin, he returned to Wigan Athletic for the nominal fee of £90,000. De Zeeuw, who is now advanced in years for the life of a footballer, wanted the guarantee of first-team football which Perrin was unwilling to provide. The majority of Portsmouth supporters lamented this decision and loss of their former captain, who had a very consistent season with Wigan at the heart of their defence, helping them to a better-than-expected mid-table finish and even received praise from then Prime Minister Tony Blair.

De Zeeuw is considered by many to be an excellent example of professionalism in the modern game. He refused to retaliate after El Hadji Diouf spat in his face during a match at the Reebok Stadium in November 2004. His response was to score the winning goal in Portsmouth's 1–0 victory.

In Wigan's second Premiership season, he struggled to get a regular first team place due to a series of injuries and was released by the club on 17 May 2007. Whilst at Wigan he started in the 2006 Football League Cup Final. In a poll to celebrate the centenary of the Professional Footballers' Association fans voted De Zeeuw to be the best player of all time for Wigan Athletic.

In June 2007, it was announced that De Zeeuw had signed a one-year contract with Coventry City. During pre-season training, a freak accident left the defender sidelined for 6 to 8 weeks. He made his debut against Bristol City on 15 September 2007. It was announced towards the end of the 2007–08 season that De Zeeuw would be one of eight first team players whose contracts would not be renewed. His season was hampered by injury and lack of form leading to new manager Chris Coleman decided he was surplus to requirements.

In 2009, he signed with ADO'20.

== Personal life ==
Following his retirement in 2009, De Zeeuw began working as an investigative detective in Alkmaar, specialising in forensics.

== Career statistics ==
Appearances and goals by club, season and competition
Club	Season	League			National Cup		League Cup		Total	
Club	Season	Division	Apps	Goals	Apps	Goals	Apps	Goals	Apps	Goals
Barnsley	1995–96	First Division	31	1	2	0	—		33	1
Barnsley	1996–97	First Division	43	2	2	0	4	0	49	2
Barnsley	1997–98	Premier League	26	0	5	0	2	0	33	0
Barnsley	1998–99	First Division	38	4	5	0	6	0	49	4
Barnsley	Total		138	7	14	0	12	0	164	7
Wigan Athletic	1999–2000	Second Division	42	3	3	0	3	0	48	3
Wigan Athletic	2000–01	Second Division	46	1	2	0	4	0	52	1
Wigan Athletic	2001–02	Second Division	42	2	1	0	1	0	44	2
Wigan Athletic	Total		130	6	6	0	8	0	144	6
Portsmouth	2002–03	First Division	38	1	—		1	0	39	1
Portsmouth	2003–04	Premier League	36	1	4	0	2	0	42	1
Portsmouth	2004–05	Premier League	32	3	2	0	3	0	37	3
Portsmouth	Total		106	5	6	0	6	0	118	5
Wigan Athletic	2005–06	Premier League	31	0	1	0	3	0	35	0
Wigan Athletic	2006–07	Premier League	21	0	—		1	0	22	0
Wigan Athletic	Total		52	0	1	0	4	0	57	0
Coventry City	2007–08	Championship	17	0	1	0	1	0	19	0
Career total			443	18	28	0	31	0	502	18

== Honours ==
Portsmouth

- Football League First Division: 2002–03

Wigan Athletic

- Football League Cup runner-up: 2005–06

Individual

- Barnsley Player of the Year: 1995–96
- PFA Team of the Year: 2000–01 Second Division, 2001–02 Second Division
