= Mike Pollitt =

English footballer

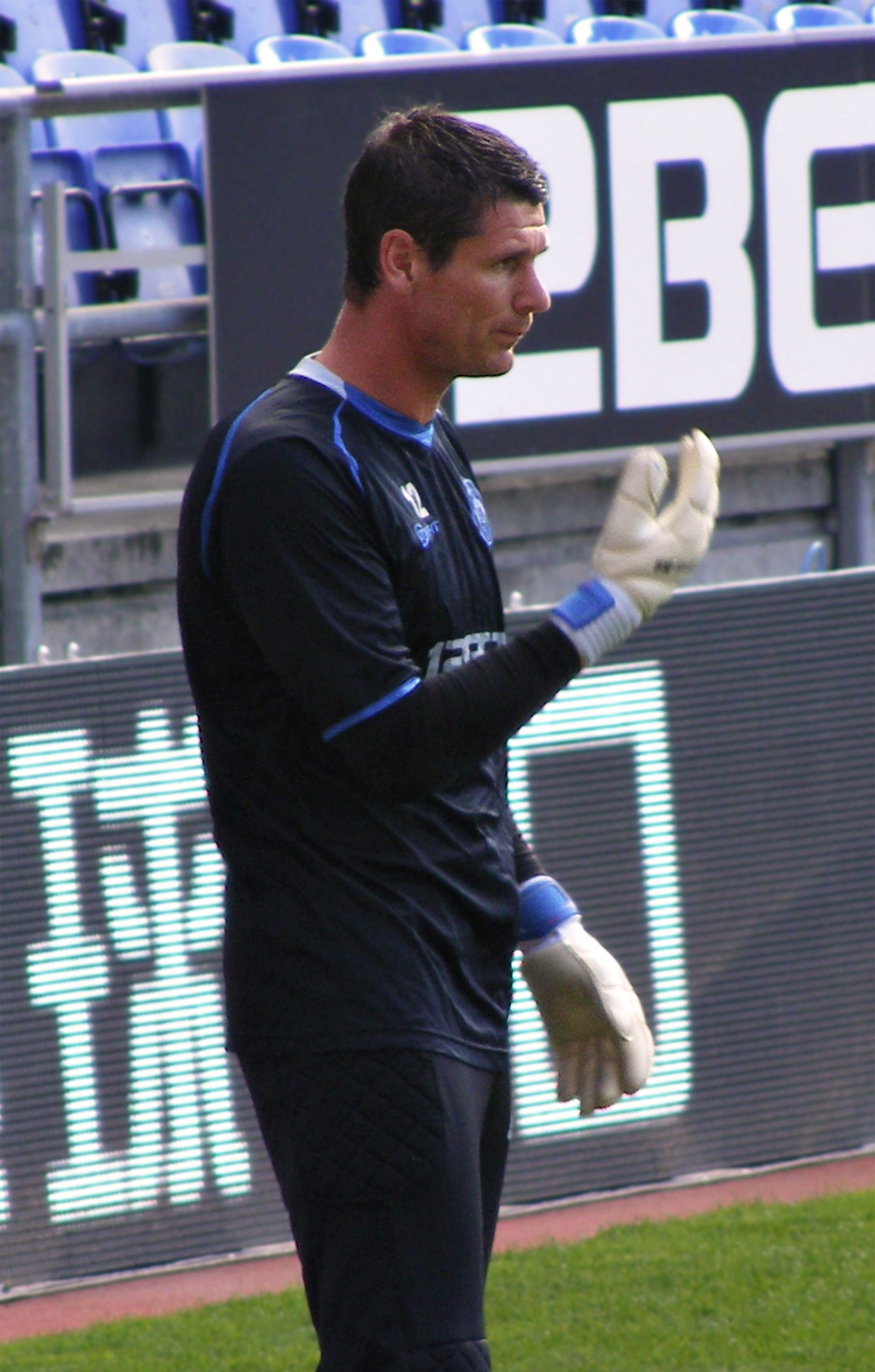
- Pollitt warming up in 2011

Personal information
- Full name: Michael Francis Pollitt
- Date of birth: 29 February 1972 (age 54)
- Place of birth: Farnworth, England
- Height: 6 ft 4 in (1.93 m)
- Position: Goalkeeper

Team information
- Current team: Preston North End (goalkeeping coach)

Youth career
- 1988–1990: Manchester United

Senior career*
Years	Team	Apps	(Gls)
1990–1991	Manchester United	0	(0)
1990	→ Oldham Athletic (loan)	0	(0)
1991	→ Macclesfield Town (loan)	1	(0)
1991–1992	Bury	0	(0)
1992	→ Lincoln City (loan)	0	(0)
1992	→ Altrincham (loan)	5	(0)
1992–1994	Lincoln City	57	(0)
1994–1995	Darlington	55	(0)
1995–1998	Notts County	10	(0)
1997	→ Oldham Athletic (loan)	16	(0)
1997–1998	→ Gillingham (loan)	6	(0)
1998	→ Brentford (loan)	5	(0)
1998	→ Sunderland (loan)	0	(0)
1998	Sunderland	0	(0)
1998–2000	Rotherham United	92	(0)
2000–2001	Chesterfield	46	(0)
2001–2005	Rotherham United	175	(0)
2005–2014	Wigan Athletic	36	(0)
2006	→ Ipswich Town (loan)	1	(0)
2007	→ Burnley (loan)	4	(0)
2013	→ Barnsley (loan)	2	(0)
Total		511	(0)
- * Club domestic league appearances and goals

Michael Francis Pollitt (born 29 February 1972) is an English former professional footballer who played as a goalkeeper.

== Club career ==
=== Manchester United ===
Born in Farnworth, Lancashire, Pollitt began his career at Manchester United turning professional in the summer of 1990 following a two-year apprenticeship. On 5 October 1990, Pollitt joined Oldham Athletic on a month's loan as back-up for Jon Hallworth but did not make a senior appearance during his time at Boundary Park. In January 1991 he joined then Football Conference side Macclesfield Town, also on loan, debuting in the 1–1 away draw with Boston United on 5 January 1991. After a further appearance in a 2–0 FA Trophy defeat at home to Gretna the following week, Pollitt returned to Old Trafford. Pollitt was released by Alex Ferguson at the end of the season.

=== Bury ===
Pollitt joined Bury ahead of the 1991–92 season but was forced to play a supporting role to regular custodian Gary Kelly. On 26 March 1992, he joined Lincoln City on loan for the remainder of the season as cover for Ian Bowling following the departure of Matt Dickins to Blackburn Rovers and was not called upon to make an appearance.

He began the 1992–93 season on loan to Football Conference side Altrincham debuting in the 1–0 home defeat to Gateshead on 25 August 1992. He played in the next three league games before heading back to Gigg Lane.

=== Lincoln City ===
On 24 September 1992, he rejoined Lincoln City on a month's loan to cover for Ian Bowling who fractured his foot in a 3–1 League Cup defeat away to Crystal Palace two days previously. Pollitt made his Football League debut in the 1–0 home defeat to Shrewsbury Town on 26 September 1992 and made five league appearances for the club, one of which came against his parent club Bury, before relinquishing his place to the returning Bowling. Pollitt however remained on loan at Sincil Bank and at the end of the second month, Lincoln officially took over the remainder of Pollitt's Bury contract. Following a brief sojourn to appear a further time for Altrincham in the 2–0 home victory over Welling United on 19 December 1992, he managed to displace Bowling from the Lincoln side over the Christmas fixtures and a series of impressive displays saw him rewarded with a new two-year contract in March 1993. He began the 1993–1994 season as the Imps first-choice goalkeeper before briefly losing his place to John Burridge over the Christmas and New Year fixtures and permanently following the signing of Andy Leaning in March 1994. In the summer, one of the first acts of newly appointed Lincoln manager Sam Ellis was to transfer list Pollitt and Dave Ridings and Pollitt soon agreed a move to Darlington.

=== Notts County ===
On 14 November 1995, his one-time Lincoln City manager Steve Thompson, acting as team manager with Colin Murphy as general manager, paid £75,000 to secure Pollitt's services for Notts County. In his time at Meadow Lane, Pollitt failed to dislodge regular custodian Darren Ward and had to wait until 22 February 1997 before making his County debut in a 2–0 away defeat to former club Bury. Seeking regular first-team football, Pollitt was sent out on loan to four clubs during the 1997–98 season.

=== Rotherham United ===
Mike Pollitt had two spells at Rotherham United, from 1998 to 2000 and 2001 to 2005. Between these two spells was a season at Chesterfield. Pollitt was very highly regarded at the South Yorkshire club, and whilst at Rotherham he registered the highest number of clean sheets (77) in the club's history. He was regarded as "one of the best goalkeepers outside the Premier League" during his time at Rotherham. After serving six years at the club Pollitt is regarded as a Rotherham United legend and one, if not the best keeper in the club's history. Following the club's relegation to League One in 2005, Pollitt made a move to Wigan Athletic, who had just won promotion to the Premier League.

=== Wigan Athletic ===
Wigan acquired his services from Rotherham United in June 2005. Prior to Rotherham, Pollitt had also played for Oldham Athletic and Sunderland but his move to Wigan (initially as cover for existing goalkeeper John Filan) following advice from Paul Barlow, gave him the chance to play Premier League football. His outstanding performances earned him a regular first team place, and in February 2006 he helped Wigan to a place in the 2006 League Cup Final. In the semi-final he saved a penalty from Arsenal's Jose Antonio Reyes to help Wigan triumph. In the final itself a hamstring injury in the opening minutes meant that he had to be substituted in the 15th minute, and was replaced by Filan.

Despite being an English goalkeeper playing in the Premier League and playing a part in the success of Wigan Athletic in the 2005–06 season, Pollitt was not considered by Sven-Göran Eriksson for inclusion in the England squad for the 2006 World Cup.

In November 2006 Pollitt joined Ipswich Town on loan for a month. However, he was recalled by Wigan after only one game because of injury worries within the Wigan squad. He was then loaned to Burnley for a month in January 2007. He played four matches for Burnley and was recalled with one match left on his loan deal after Chris Kirkland picked up an injury. He agreed to a new one-year contract with Wigan in May 2009 and subsequently extended his deal by another year in May 2010. The deal was extended for a further year in July 2011, which ensured that Pollitt remained at the club after his 40th birthday. Pollitt's stay was extended to an eighth season when he agreed a further one-year contract extension in June 2012, where was second choice to Ali Al-Habsi in the 2010–11 and 2011–12 seasons. Pollitt made his first competitive start for Wigan in more than two years against AFC Bournemouth in the FA Cup on 5 January 2013, and he also started the replay but was substituted off at half time due to an injury. At the end of the season he had his contract extended by another year. On 27 August 2013, Pollitt joined fellow Championship side Barnsley on a month-long loan.

Pollitt retired at the end of the 2013–14 season, having played 52 games for Wigan in nine years.

== Coaching career ==
On 25 June 2014, he was appointed as Wigan's new goalkeeping coach. Following the departure of manager Gary Caldwell, Pollitt along with chief scout Malcolm Crosby left the club at the end of October 2016. On 12 January 2017, Pollitt returned to Rotherham United to take on the role of goalkeeping coach. On 6 December 2019, he departed the club to become goalkeeping coach at his home town team Bolton Wanderers. He was delighted to finally be part of the team after waiting 30 years. He left on 4 July. Three weeks later he was named the new goalkeeping coach of Preston North End.

On 9th November Pollitt was relieved of his duties at Preston North End

== Honours ==
Wigan Athletic

- Football League Cup runner-up: 2005–06

Individual

- PFA Team of the Year: 1999–2000 Third Division, 2000–01 Third Division
