= 2009–10 Newcastle United F.C. season =

Newcastle United
2009–10 season
- Managing director: Derek Llambias
- Manager: Chris Hughton
- Stadium: St James' Park
- Championship: 1st (promoted)
- FA Cup: Fourth round
- League Cup: Third round
- Top goalscorer: League: Andy Carroll; Kevin Nolan (17 each); All: Andy Carroll (19)
- Highest home attendance: 52,181 (v Ipswich Town)
- Lowest home attendance: 15,805 (v Plymouth Argyle – FA Cup)
Home colours	Away colours	Third colours

The 2009–10 season was the first time Newcastle United had played in the Championship following relegation after 16 consecutive years in the Premier League. In this season, they won promotion back to the top division after winning the Championship.

Following the club's relegation in the previous season, the team's pre-season had been dominated by uncertainty over manager, owner and the players. By the time the season began, caretaker manager Chris Hughton was put in charge, and his position was made permanent in October. Despite a blip in October, the club spent almost all of its season in the top three in the division and some blistering home results saw Newcastle automatically promoted by Easter. They confirmed their promotion as winners of the entire division two weeks later, with the club registering 102 points.

== Season summary ==
The club spent the majority of the pre-season searching for a new owner, and by the start of the season, no successful attempt was made to sell the club, and no players signings were made. Obafemi Martins, Sébastien Bassong, Habib Beye, David Edgar, Damien Duff, Michael Owen, Peter Løvenkrands and Mark Viduka all departed the club.

Alan Shearer announced he was unsure whether he would be continuing as manager due to lack of contact from the club.

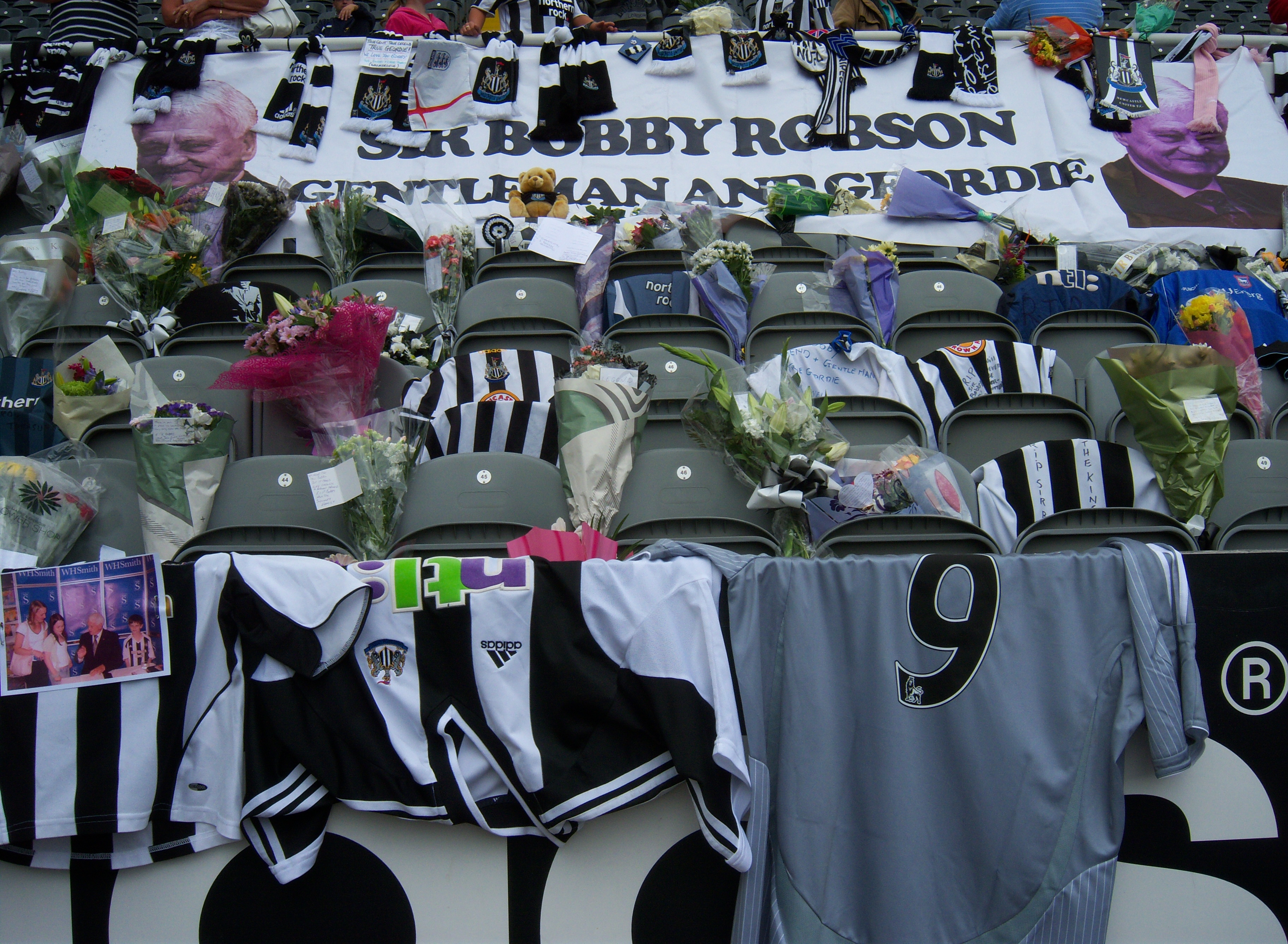
Tributes to Sir Bobby Robson at St James' Park

An emotional distraction from the club's situation occurred when Sir Bobby Robson died on 31 July 2009, uniting the world of football in tributes to the manager who was fondly remembered by Newcastle United fans as well the many other clubs he managed in his time, including the national side. St James' Park proved to be the leading tribute for Sir Bobby Robson as tributes of flowers and messages were laid among the stadium. The season went underway managerless with some players futures at the club still in jeopardy, but achieving a draw with West Bromwich Albion on the opening day of the Championship, and a 3–0 victory over Reading, as Shola Ameobi scored and dedicated his hat-trick to the late Sir Bobby Robson.

Several takeover bids were revealed, yet none prevailed. United, however, continued a bright opening start to the season with six games unbeaten at the top of the table, and caretaker boss Chris Hughton collect the Manager of the Month prize for the Championship. The transfer window closed without full-time players signed, although Løvenkrands decided to rejoin on the final day of the transfer window, but Hughton was granted permission to sign players on loan, acquiring Danny Simpson from Manchester United, and Zurab Khizanishvili from Blackburn Rovers. Later in the year, he signed Marlon Harewood on loan from Aston Villa and Fabrice Pancrate on a free transfer.

=== Chris Hughton ===
After Kevin Keegan ruled out another return to Newcastle, Chris Hughton became the club's permanent manager on 27 October 2009. He expressed his honour and delight at the role and felt challenged by the aim to take united back to the Premier League. Simultaneously, Ashley once again withdrew the club from sale after again claiming he had been unsuccessful in finding a suitable buyer for the club, despite reducing his asking price to £80 million, also announcing he held deep regret over buying the club. the club confirmed he would invest more money into the club's debt and would work on re-branding the stadium name. Derek Llambias confirmed that St James' Park would not be completely renamed, but linked with a notable sponsorship deal. Fan protests, however, continued on Ashley upon the club's home win against Peterborough United, with banners and chants being demonstrated against his plans before, during and after the match.

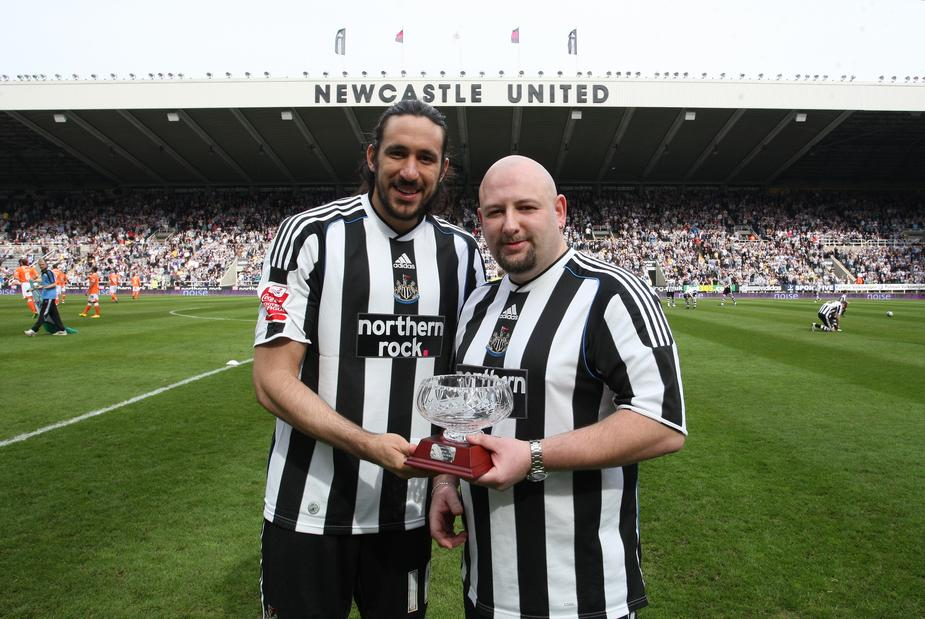
Jonás Gutiérrez is presented with Player of the Month in April 2010

The squad, however, continued to produce good results, and by mid-December had established a seven-point lead on top of the Championship table, producing seven wins back-to-back, the first of which the club has produced since 1996 under Keegan. The club still remained top of the league as of January 2010 and had an impressive Peter Løvenkrands hat-trick in a 3–0 win over Plymouth Argyle in the FA Cup, but following a loss to title rivals West Brom, the club were knocked out of the competition. The January transfer window saw Marlon Harewood returned to parent club Aston Villa following an injury, Hughton moving to strengthen the club's defence by signing Danny Simpson permanently, Fitz Hall from QPR defender Mike Williamson from Portsmouth, and defender Patrick van Aanholt on a month's loan from Chelsea. He also signed Queens Park Rangers winger Wayne Routledge. A bid for Crystal Palace striker Victor Moses was unsuccessful as Moses opted to move instead to Premier League team Wigan Athletic. Moreover, the club failed to sign Jermaine Beckford from Leeds United nor Sol Campbell on a free deal, who ironically announced expressed interest. The final transfer saw Coventry City striker Leon Best join the club on a 3 1/2-year deal.

In March 2010, Kevin Nolan was named the Championship Player of the Year in the Football League Awards.

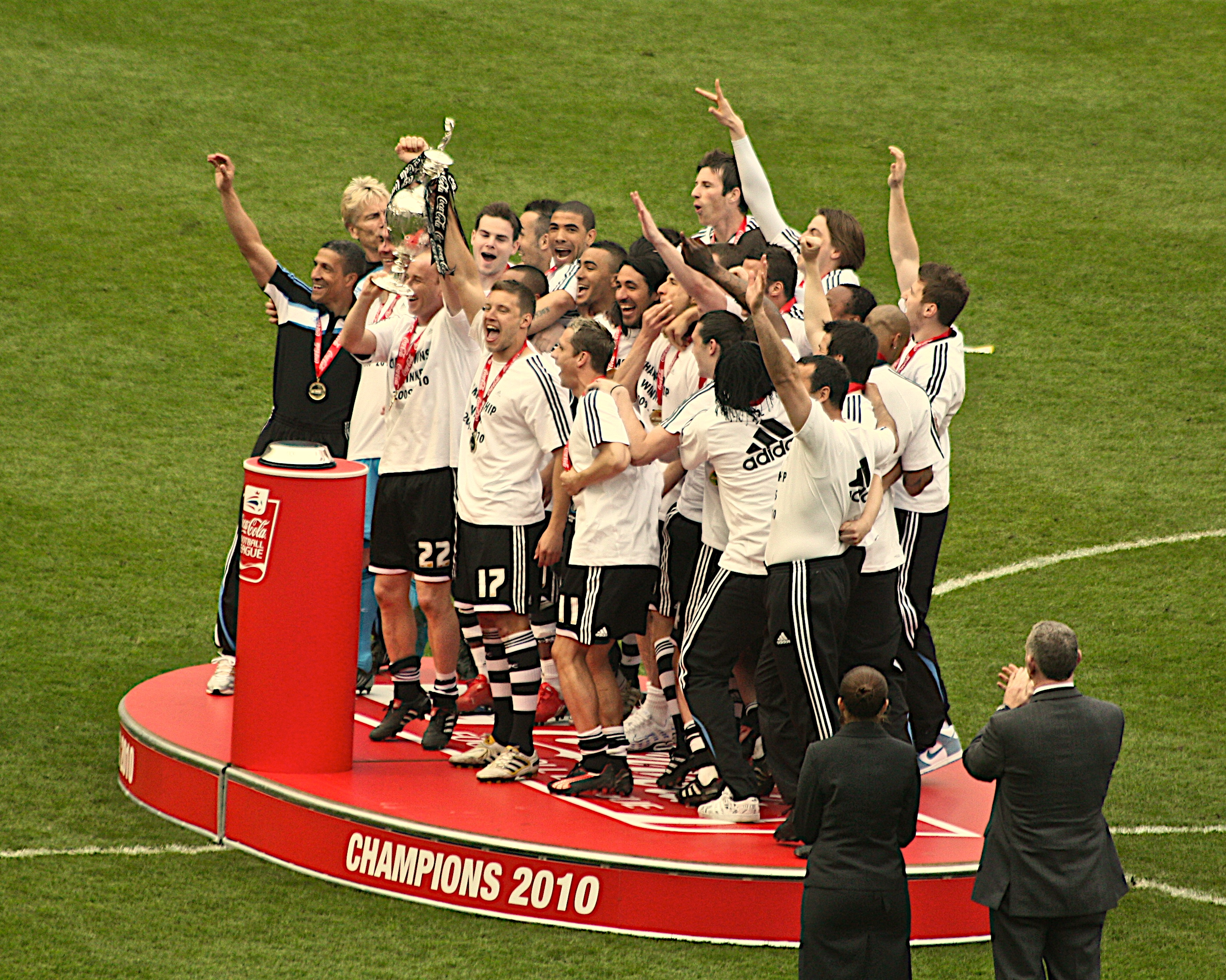
Newcastle players celebrate the club's promotion in 2010

Worries of the club's promotion ambitions began to surface following allegations of Steven Taylor and Andy Carroll being involved in a fight at the club's training ground, with both said to have been hospitalised following the incident. Carroll returned to the squad the following day to score the winner against Doncaster Rovers, and despite leaving hospital the following day also, after surgery, Taylor was confirmed to miss the rest of the season, despite being in the final stages of recovery from a knee injury, with rumours of also suffering a broken jaw.

The club, however, secured promotion back to the Premier League on 5 April 2010 following Nottingham Forest only managing a 0–0 draw with Cardiff City, leaving the club indefinitely finishing in the top two of the table. Although a win against Sheffield United that evening would have secured the promotion for the club nonetheless, the club defeated Sheffield 2–1 and manager Chris Hughton celebrated with a promotion party after the match with the players celebrating with the fans.

Newcastle United won the Championship League Trophy on 19 April 2010 following a 2–0 victory at Plymouth.

The club finished the final games of the season with a 2–2 draw with Ipswich Town at St James' Park and a final day, 1–0 away win at QPR. The final league table saw Newcastle breaking the 100 points barrier, winning 30 league games, drawing 12 and losing only 4.

== Team kit ==
The team kit for the 2009–10 season is produced by Adidas and Northern Rock will remain as the main sponsor. During the season Northern Rock signed a new contract but dissatisfaction with Mike Ashley saw Adidas terminate their deal after 15 years as sponsors. Puma became Newcastle's new kit makers at the end of the season.

== Chronological list of events ==
- 3 June 2009: Newcastle United and Middlesbrough were given byes into the second round of the League Cup.
- 11 June 2009: Singapore-based Profitable Group declared an interest in acquiring Newcastle United.
- 17 June 2009: The Championship 2009–2010 season fixtures were announced.
- 19 June 2009: Four unidentified groups progressed to the due diligence phase in the bid to take over the club. Neither Profitable Group or the consortium involving Freddy Shepherd were amongst them.
- 22 June 2009: Newcastle unveil new yellow striped away kit.
- 27 June 2009: Mark Hulse and Robbie Elliott announced that they would quit the backroom staff at the end of July.
- 11 July 2009: Newcastle's first Pre-Season Friendly sees them thrash Irish side Shamrock Rovers 3–0 on their home turf.
- 13 July 2009: Newcastle's planned pre-season match on 26 July against Utrecht was cancelled, following concerns raised by the Mayor of Amsterdam regarding both Newcastle and Sunderland visiting the Netherlands at the same time
- 18 July 2009: A Fine Performance sees Chris Hughton's side thrash Darlington 7–2 at the Darlington Arena
- 21 July 2009: The Magpies win their third friendly in a row beating Huddersfield Town 2–1.
- 25 July 2009: Newcastle suffer probably their most humiliating friendly defeat losing 6–1 at League 1 side Leyton Orient, some newspapers then say that they're going down again.
- 28 July 2009: Profitable Group stated they had no further interest in buying the club, citing "a lack of communication and response" from Mike Ashley.
- 29 July 2009: Newcastle's only pre-season match at St James' Park sees them held to a goalless draw by Leeds United
- 31 July 2009: Newcastle United mourned the passing of former manager Sir Bobby Robson, who died following a long battle with cancer.
- 2 August 2009: Newcastle unveiled new black and blue striped third kit.

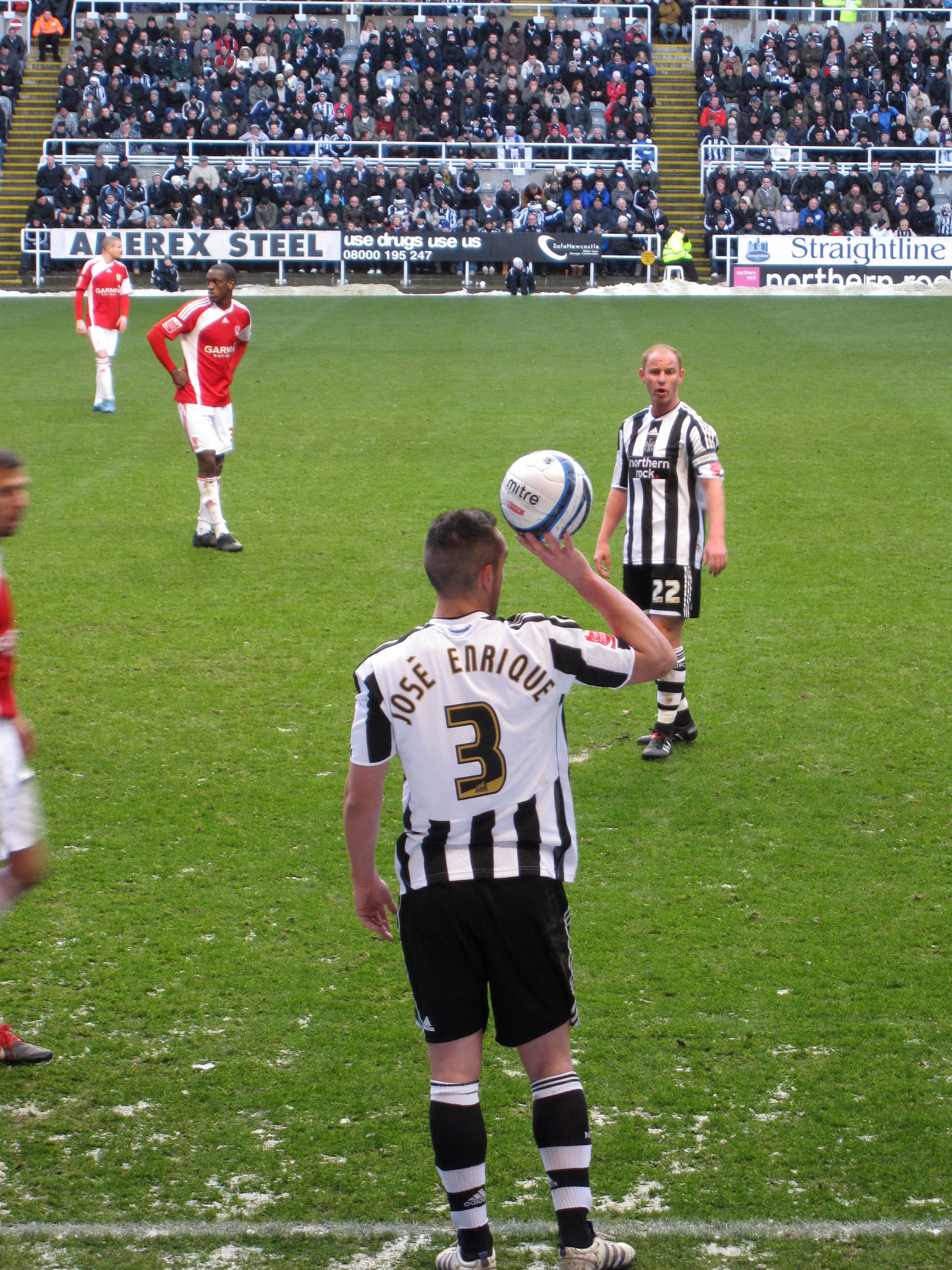
José Enrique prepares to throw to Nicky Butt, December 2009

- 8 August 2009: Newcastle's first match of the season sees Damien Duff earn a 1–1 draw at West Brom, who were also relegated in what proved to be the Irishman's last game for the club.
- 14 August 2009: Danny Simpson joins on loan from Manchester United
- 15 August 2009: Shola Ameobi nets his first Newcastle hat-trick in a 3–0 win over Reading.
- 18 August 2009: Derek Llambias stated that Barry Moat had "stepped up his interest" in regards to a possible £100 million takeover.
- 19 August 2009: Shola Ameobi goes to the top of the Championship goal scoring charts with the only goal of a win over Sheffield Wednesday
- 22 August 2009: Newcastle win 2–0 at Crystal Palace to move into second place, with Kevin Nolan and Ryan Taylor scoring their first goals for the club.
- 24 August 2009: Newcastle United made an official statement extending the deadline for Barry Moat to table an offer for the club.
- 26 August 2009: Geoff Sheard confirmed that he was fronting a bid by a mystery American company to buy the club.
- 26 August 2009: In a classic Carling Cup encounter at home to League 1 Huddersfield Town, the visitors equalized through Theo Robinson just a minute after Danny Guthrie opened the scoring before taking a 3–1 lead through another for Robinson from the penalty spot and a Jordan Rhodes strike. However, a Geremi goal and a Kevin Nolan strike sandwiching a Shola Ameobi penalty give Newcastle a 4–3 win, denying former Newcastle midfielder Lee Clark's team their first win on Tyneside since October 1953, just five weeks after the terriers were beaten in a friendly by the Magpies.
- 31 August 2009: A fantastic strike from Danny Guthrie puts Newcastle top of the Championship with a 1–0 win over Leicester City.
- 3 September 2009: Chief scout Lil Fuccillo joined Championship rivals Swansea City.
- 13 September 2009: Newcastle are the first team to win at promotion rivals Cardiff City's new Cardiff City Stadium thanks to Fabricio Coloccini's first Newcastle goal.
- 16 September 2009: Chris Hughton's side suffer a first league defeat of the season at Blackpool despite Andy Carroll's first goal of the season.
- 26 September 2009: Both teams playing in the Ipswich Town – Newcastle United match wore strips commemorating Sir Bobby Robson. The strips were to be auctioned after the match, with the proceeds going to the Sir Bobby Robson Foundation.
- 2 October 2009: Former manager Kevin Keegan was awarded £2 million damages by an employment tribunal for constructive dismissal.
- 27 October 2009: Newcastle appointed Chris Hughton as permanent manager until the end of the 2010–11 season. Also, Mike Ashley announced that he had taken the club off the market and intended to invest a further £20 million.
- 18 January 2010: Northern Rock signed a new four-year sponsorship deal with Newcastle United, worth between £1.5 and £10 million, starting from the 2010–11 season.
- 19 January 2010: Puma signed a deal to become the club's official supplier for two years starting from the beginning of the 2010–11 season.
- 5 April 2010: Newcastle promoted to the Premier League for the 2010–11 season after Nottingham Forest draw 0–0 with Cardiff.
- 19 April 2010: Newcastle won the Football League Championship after a 2–0 win over Plymouth Argyle.
- 24 April 2010: Newcastle lifted the Championship trophy in front of a new Championship record attendance of 52,181 fans after a 2–2 draw with Ipswich.
- 2 May 2010: Newcastle finished the 2009–10 season with a 1–0 victory at Queens Park Rangers. This gave the team a total of 102 League points, surpassing the 100-point mark for the first time in the club's history.

== Players ==
=== First-team ===
Squad at end of season

Note: Flags indicate national team as defined under FIFA eligibility rules; some limited exceptions apply. Players may hold more than one non-FIFA nationality.

No.	Pos.	Nation	Player
1	GK	ENG	Steve Harper
2	DF	ARG	Fabricio Coloccini
3	DF	ESP	José Enrique
4	MF	ENG	Kevin Nolan
5	DF	ENG	Fitz Hall (on loan from Queens Park Rangers)
6	DF	ENG	Mike Williamson
7	MF	ENG	Joey Barton
8	MF	ENG	Danny Guthrie
10	MF	ENG	Wayne Routledge
11	FW	DEN	Peter Løvenkrands
12	DF	ENG	Danny Simpson
16	DF	ENG	Ryan Taylor
17	FW	ENG	Alan Smith
18	MF	ARG	Jonás Gutiérrez

No.	Pos.	Nation	Player
20	FW	IRL	Leon Best
21	MF	FRA	Fabrice Pancrate
22	MF	ENG	Nicky Butt
23	FW	ENG	Shola Ameobi
24	FW	ENG	Andy Carroll
25	MF	COD	Kazenga LuaLua
26	GK	NED	Tim Krul
27	DF	ENG	Steven Taylor
28	DF	HUN	Tamás Kádár
30	FW	ENG	Nile Ranger
35	DF	ENG	Ben Tozer
42	FW	ENG	Ryan Donaldson
44	DF	ENG	James Tavernier
46	MF	SLO	Haris Vučkić

=== Left club during season ===
Note: Flags indicate national team as defined under FIFA eligibility rules; some limited exceptions apply. Players may hold more than one non-FIFA nationality.

No.	Pos.	Nation	Player
10	FW	ENG	Marlon Harewood (on loan from Aston Villa)
11	MF	IRL	Damien Duff (to Fulham)
13	DF	GEO	Zurab Khizanishvili (on loan from Blackburn Rovers)
14	DF	NED	Patrick van Aanholt (on loan from Chelsea)

No.	Pos.	Nation	Player
19	FW	ESP	Xisco (on loan to Racing Santander)
20	MF	CMR	Geremi (to Ankaragücü)
29	FW	ITA	Fabio Zamblera (on loan to Roma)
34	GK	ENG	Fraser Forster (on loan to Norwich City)

=== Reserve squad ===
The following players did not appear for the first team this season, and made most of their appearances for the reserves, but may have also appeared for the under-18s.

Note: Flags indicate national team as defined under FIFA eligibility rules; some limited exceptions apply. Players may hold more than one non-FIFA nationality.

No.	Pos.	Nation	Player
31	FW	NED	Frank Wiafe Danquah
32	FW	FRA	Wesley Ngo Baheng
33	GK	SWE	Ole Söderberg
37	DF	IRL	Callum Morris
41	DF	NIR	Shane Ferguson
43	MF	ENG	Jonny Godsmark

No.	Pos.	Nation	Player
45	DF	ENG	Darren Lough
—	DF	ENG	Matthew Grieve
—	DF	ENG	Daniel Leadbitter
—	MF	NIR	Paddy McLaughlin
—	FW	FRO	Jóan Símun Edmundsson

=== Under-18 squad ===
The following players made most of their appearances for the under-18s, but may have also appeared for the reserves.

Note: Flags indicate national team as defined under FIFA eligibility rules; some limited exceptions apply. Players may hold more than one non-FIFA nationality.

No.	Pos.	Nation	Player
47	MF	AUS	Bradden Inman
—	GK	ENG	Jak Alnwick
—	GK	AUS	Alex Baird
—	GK	ENG	Sam Grieveson
—	GK	ENG	Max Johnson
—	GK	ENG	Scott Pocklington
—	GK	ENG	Ben Robinson
—	DF	ENG	Paul Dummett
—	DF	ENG	Jeff Henderson
—	DF	ENG	Michael Hoganson
—	DF	ENG	Oliver Nicholas
—	DF	ENG	Alex Nicholson
—	DF	ENG	Remie Streete
—	DF	ENG	James Tavernier
—	DF	ENG	James Taylor
—	DF	IRL	Stephen Folan
—	DF	COD	Patrick Nzuzi
—	MF	ENG	Sammy Ameobi

No.	Pos.	Nation	Player
—	MF	ENG	Liam Henderson
—	MF	ENG	Marcus Maddison
—	MF	ENG	Greg McDermott
—	MF	ENG	Ryan McGorrigan
—	MF	ENG	Conor Newton
—	MF	ENG	Ryan Page
—	MF	ENG	Daniel Williams
—	MF	SCO	Steven Logan
—	MF	COD	Andy Mogwo
—	FW	ENG	Phil Airey
—	FW	ENG	Adam Campbell
—	FW	ENG	Billy Ions
—	FW	ENG	Dennis Knight
—	FW	ENG	Aaron Spear
—	FW	ENG	Dan Taylor
—	FW	NIR	Michael McCrudden
—	FW	SWE	Samuel Adjei

== Statistics ==
=== Appearances, goals and cards ===
(Substitute appearances in brackets)

No.	Pos.	Name	League		FA Cup		League Cup		Total		Discipline	
No.	Pos.	Name	Apps	Goals	Apps	Goals	Apps	Goals	Apps	Goals	Yellow card	Red card
1	GK	(England) Steve Harper	45	0	0	0	0	0	45	0	0	0
2	DF	(Argentina) Fabricio Coloccini	37	2	3	0	0	0	40	2	5	0
3	DF	(Spain) José Enrique	33 (1)	1	2	0	1	0	36 (1)	1	3	0
4	MF	(England) Kevin Nolan	44	17	2	0	1 (1)	1	47 (1)	18	10	1
5	DF	(England) Fitz Hall	7	0	0	0	0	0	7	0	1	0
6	DF	(England) Mike Williamson	16	0	0	0	0	0	16	0	3	0
7	MF	(England) Joey Barton	8 (7)	1	0	0	0	0	8 (7)	1	1	0
8	MF	(England) Danny Guthrie	36 (2)	4	2 (1)	0	2	1	40 (3)	5	5	1
10	FW	(England) Marlon Harewood	9 (6)	5	0	0	0	0	9 (6)	5	2	0
10	MF	(England) Wayne Routledge	15 (2)	3	0	0	0	0	15 (2)	3	1	0
11	MF	(Republic of Ireland) Damien Duff	1	1	0	0	0	0	1	1	0	0
11	FW	(Denmark) Peter Løvenkrands	19 (10)	13	1 (1)	3	1	0	21 (11)	16	0	0
12	DF	(England) Danny Simpson	39	1	1	0	1	0	41	1	4	0
13	DF	(Georgia (country)) Zurab Khizanishvili	6 (1)	0	0	0	0	0	6 (1)	0	2	1
14	DF	(Netherlands) Patrick van Aanholt	7	0	0	0	0	0	7	0	1	0
16	DF	(England) Ryan Taylor	19 (12)	4	3	0	2	0	24 (12)	4	7	1
17	MF	(England) Alan Smith	31 (1)	0	2	0	0 (1)	0	33 (2)	0	10	1
18	MF	(Argentina) Jonás Gutiérrez	34 (3)	4	2 (1)	0	0 (1)	0	36 (5)	4	1	0
19	FW	(Spain) Xisco	0 (2)	0	0	0	0	0	0 (2)	0	0	0
20	MF	(Cameroon) Geremi	3 (4)	0	0	0	1 (1)	1	4 (5)	1	0	0
20	FW	(Republic of Ireland) Leon Best	6 (7)	0	0	0	0	0	6 (7)	0	3	0
21	MF	(France) Fabrice Pancrate	5 (11)	1	3	0	0	0	8 (11)	1	0	0
22	MF	(England) Nicky Butt	10 (7)	0	2	0	1	0	13 (7)	0	1	0
23	FW	(Nigeria) Shola Ameobi	11 (7)	10	1 (1)	0	0 (1)	1	12 (9)	11	2	0
24	FW	(England) Andy Carroll	33 (6)	17	2 (1)	2	0	0	35 (7)	19	9	0
25	MF	(Democratic Republic of the Congo) Kazenga LuaLua	0 (1)	0	0	0	2	0	2 (1)	0	0	0
26	GK	(Netherlands) Tim Krul	3	0	0	0	0	0	3	0	0	0
27	DF	(England) Steven Taylor	21	1	1	0	1	0	23	1	2	0
28	DF	(Hungary) Tamás Kádár	6 (7)	0	2	0	1	0	9 (7)	0	2	0
30	FW	(England) Nile Ranger	4 (21)	2	1 (2)	0	2	0	7 (23)	2	1	0
35	DF	(England) Ben Tozer	0 (1)	0	0	0	1	0	1 (1)	0	0	0
42	FW	(England) Ryan Donaldson	0 (2)	0	0 (2)	0	1	0	1 (4)	0	0	0
46	MF	(Slovenia) Haris Vučkić	0 (2)	0	0	0	1 (1)	0	1 (3)	0	0	0

=== Starting formations ===
Formation	League	FA Cup	League Cup	Total
4–4–2	39	3	2	44
4–4–1–1	5	0	0	5
4–5–1	2	0	0	2

=== Captains ===
No.	Pos.	Name	Starts
17	MF	(England) Alan Smith	26
22	MF	(England) Nicky Butt	13
4	MF	(England) Kevin Nolan	11
27	DF	(England) Steven Taylor	1

=== Coaching staff ===
Position	Staff
Manager	(Republic of Ireland) Chris Hughton
Assistant manager	(Scotland) Colin Calderwood
First team coach	(England) Peter Beardsley
Goalkeeping coach	(England) Paul Barron
Development coach	(Scotland) Willie Donachie
Reserve team coach	(England) Alan Thompson
Chief scout	(England) Graham Carr

Last updated: 3 May 2011

== Transfers ==
=== In ===
Date	Pos.	Name	From	Fee	Source
1 September 2009	FW	(Denmark) Peter Løvenkrands	Free	Free	
21 November 2009	MF	(France) Fabrice Pancrate	(France) Paris Saint-Germain	Free	
20 January 2010	DF	(England) Danny Simpson	(England) Manchester United	£750,000	
26 January 2010	MF	(England) Wayne Routledge	(England) Queens Park Rangers	£1,000,000	
27 January 2010	DF	(England) Mike Williamson	(England) Portsmouth	£1,000,000	
1 February 2010	FW	(Republic of Ireland) Leon Best	(England) Coventry City	Undisclosed	

- Total spending: ▼ ~ £2,750,000

=== Out ===
Date	Pos.	Name	To	Fee	Source
1 July 2009	MF	(England) Mark Donninger	(England) Blyth Spartans	Free	
1 July 2009	MF	(England) James Marwood	Free agent	Free	
1 July 2009	DF	(Brazil) Caçapa	(Brazil) Cruzeiro	Free	
1 July 2009	FW	(Denmark) Peter Løvenkrands	Free agent	Free	
1 July 2009	FW	(Australia) Mark Viduka	Retired	Free	
1 July 2009	DF	(Canada) David Edgar	(England) Burnley	Released	
3 July 2009	FW	(England) Michael Owen	(England) Manchester United	Released	
31 July 2009	FW	(Nigeria) Obafemi Martins	(Germany) VfL Wolfsburg	£9,000,000	
6 August 2009	DF	(Cameroon) Sébastien Bassong	(England) Tottenham Hotspur	£8,000,000	
7 August 2009	DF	(Senegal) Habib Beye	(England) Aston Villa	£2,500,000	
18 August 2009	MF	(Republic of Ireland) Damien Duff	(England) Fulham	£4,000,000	
31 January 2010	MF	(Cameroon) Geremi	(Turkey) Ankaragücü	Undisclosed	

- Total income: ▲ ~ £23,500,000

=== Loans in ===
Date	Pos.	Name	From	Expiry	Source
31 July 2009	DF	(England) Danny Simpson	(England) Manchester United	18 January 2010	
17 September 2009	DF	(Georgia (country)) Zurab Khizanishvili	(England) Blackburn Rovers	17 December 2009	
25 September 2009	FW	(England) Marlon Harewood	(England) Aston Villa	26 December 2009	
29 January 2010	DF	(England) Fitz Hall	(England) Queens Park Rangers	31 May 2010	
29 January 2010	DF	(Netherlands) Patrick van Aanholt	(England) Chelsea	28 February 2010	

=== Loans out ===
Date	Pos.	Name	To	Expiry	Source
31 July 2009	GK	(England) Fraser Forster	(England) Bristol Rovers	31 August 2009	
6 August 2009	FW	(England) Jonny Godsmark	(England) Hereford United	31 January 2010	
28 August 2009	GK	(England) Fraser Forster	(England) Norwich City	1 June 2010	
31 August 2009	FW	(Spain) Xisco	(Spain) Racing Santander	1 June 2010	
1 September 2009	FW	(Italy) Fabio Zamblera	(Italy) Roma	1 June 2010	
9 February 2010	MF	(Democratic Republic of the Congo) Kazenga LuaLua	(England) Brighton & Hove Albion	9 March 2010	

- *=Jonny Godsmark returned early from Hereford United due to an injury.

== Competitions ==
Win Draw Loss

=== Pre-season ===
Match	1	2	3	4	5	6
Result	3–0	7–2	1–0	1–6	0–0	1–1

=== League ===
Round	1	2	3	4	5	6	7	8	9	10	11	12	13	14	15	16	17	18	19	20	21	22	23
Result	1–1	3–0	1–0	2–0	1–0	1–0	1–2	3–1	4–0	1–1	0–0	0–1	1–2	2–1	1–0	3–1	1–0	3–0	2–0	2–0	2–2	2–0	2–2
Position	12th	3rd	3rd	3rd	1st	1st	3rd	2nd	1st	1st	1st	2nd	2nd	1st	1st	1st	1st	1st	1st	1st	1st	1st	1st

Round	24	25	26	27	28	29	30	31	32	33	34	35	36	37	38	39	40	41	42	43	44	45	46
Result	0–0	2–2	2–0	0–0	5–1	0–3	1–1	4–1	3–0	2–1	6–1	2–2	3–0	2–2	1–0	2–0	3–2	2–1	4–1	2–1	2–0	2–2	1–0
Position	1st	1st	1st	1st	1st	2nd	1st	1st	1st	1st	1st	1st	1st	1st	1st	1st	1st	1st	1st	1st	1st	1st	1st

=== FA Cup ===
Match	1	2	3
Result	0–0	3–0	2–4

=== League Cup ===
Match	1	2
Result	4–3	0–2

== Matches ==
=== Pre-season ===
11 July 2009	Shamrock Rovers	0–3	Newcastle United	Dublin
15:00 BST		(Report)	S. Taylor 50'; Ameobi 87'; Ranger 89'	Stadium: Tallaght Stadium; Attendance: 5,200; Referee: Ian Doyle

18 July 2009	Darlington	2–7	Newcastle United	Darlington
12:30 BST	Windass 7' (pen.), 65'	(Report)	Duff 3'; Nolan 17'; Ameobi 27', 36'; Gutiérrez 47'; S. Taylor 58'; Carroll 75'	Stadium: The Northern Echo Darlington Arena; Attendance: 6,698; Referee: Eddie Ilderton

21 July 2009	Huddersfield Town	0–1	Newcastle United	Huddersfield
19:45 BST		(Report)	Nolan 68'	Stadium: Galpharm Stadium; Attendance: 9,691; Referee: Jonathan Moss

25 July 2009	Leyton Orient	6–1	Newcastle United	Leyton
15:00 BST	Smith 4'; Thornton 23' (pen.); McGleish 53'; Mkandawire 55'; Jarvis 83'; Baker 86'	(Report)	Barton 30' (pen.)	Stadium: Brisbane Road; Attendance: 3,615; Referee: Jarnail Singh

29 July 2009	Newcastle United	0–0	Leeds United	Newcastle upon Tyne
19:45 BST		(Report)		Stadium: St James' Park; Attendance: 16,945; Referee: Nigel Miller

2 August 2009	Dundee United	1–1	Newcastle United	Dundee
15:00 BST	Goodwillie 85' (pen.)	(Report)	Carroll 60'	Stadium: Tannadice Park; Attendance: 8,876; Referee: Chris Boyle

=== League ===
8 August 2009	West Bromwich Albion	1–1	Newcastle United	West Bromwich
17:30 BST	Martis 39'	(Report)	Duff 55'	Stadium: The Hawthorns; Attendance: 23,502; Referee: Mike Dean

15 August 2009	Newcastle United	3–0	Reading	Newcastle upon Tyne
17:20 BST	Ameobi 38', 61', 75' (pen.)	(Report)		Stadium: St James' Park; Attendance: 36,944; Referee: Anthony Taylor

19 August 2009	Newcastle United	1–0	Sheffield Wednesday	Newcastle upon Tyne
19:45 BST	Ameobi 15'	(Report)		Stadium: St James' Park; Attendance: 43,904; Referee: Phil Dowd

22 August 2009	Crystal Palace	0–2	Newcastle United	London
15:00 BST		(Report)	Nolan 2'; R. Taylor 21'	Stadium: Selhurst Park; Attendance: 20,643; Referee: Andy D'Urso

31 August 2009	Newcastle United	1–0	Leicester City	Newcastle upon Tyne
19:45 BST	Guthrie 52'	(Report)		Stadium: St James' Park; Attendance: 38,813; Referee: Neil Swarbrick

13 September 2009	Cardiff City	0–1	Newcastle United	Cardiff
14:05 BST		(Report)	Coloccini 18'; Smith (yellow card) 66' (yellow-red card) 90+2'	Stadium: Cardiff City Stadium; Attendance: 25,630; Referee: Andrew Hall

16 September 2009	Blackpool	2–1	Newcastle United	Blackpool
19:45 BST	Ormerod 45+2'; Euell 65'	(Report)	Carroll 40'	Stadium: Bloomfield Road; Attendance: 9,647; Referee: Jonathan Moss

19 September 2009	Newcastle United	3–1	Plymouth Argyle	Newcastle upon Tyne
15:00 BST	S. Taylor 6'; Nolan 61'; Carroll 84'	(Report)	Duguid 50'	Stadium: St James' Park; Attendance: 42,898; Referee: Scott Mathieson

26 September 2009	Ipswich Town	0–4	Newcastle United	Ipswich
17:30 BST		(Report)	Nolan 30', 32', 51'; R. Taylor 34'	Stadium: Portman Road; Attendance: 27,059; Referee: Mike Jones

30 September 2009	Newcastle United	1–1	Queens Park Rangers	Newcastle upon Tyne
19:45 BST	Harewood 70'	(Report)	Watson 7'	Stadium: St James' Park; Attendance: 38,923; Referee: Rob Shoebridge

3 October 2009	Newcastle United	0–0	Bristol City	Newcastle upon Tyne
15:00 BST		(Report)		Stadium: St James' Park; Attendance: 43,326; Referee: Graham Salisbury

17 October 2009	Nottingham Forest	1–0	Newcastle United	Nottingham
17:20 BST	Blackstock 45'	(Report)		Stadium: City Ground; Attendance: 29,155; Referee: Paul Taylor

20 October 2009	Scunthorpe United	2–1	Newcastle United	Scunthorpe
19:45 BST	Woolford 53', 79'	(Report)	Nolan 65'	Stadium: Glanford Park; Attendance: 8,921; Referee: Andy Penn

24 October 2009	Newcastle United	2–1	Doncaster Rovers	Newcastle upon Tyne
15:00 BST	Carroll 67'; Khizanishvili (red card) 85'; Nolan 90+2'	(Report)	Shiels 18'	Stadium: St James' Park; Attendance: 43,949; Referee: Darren Deadman

2 November 2009	Sheffield United	0–1	Newcastle United	Sheffield
19:45 GMT		(Report)	Morgan 54' (o.g.)	Stadium: Bramall Lane; Attendance: 26,536; Referee: Kevin Friend

7 November 2009	Newcastle United	3–1	Peterborough United	Newcastle upon Tyne
15:00 GMT	Gutiérrez 15'; Carroll 18'; Simpson 52'	(Report)	Keates 79'	Stadium: St James' Park; Attendance: 43,067; Referee: Andy D'Urso

23 November 2009	Preston North End	0–1	Newcastle United	Preston
19:45 GMT		(Report)	Nolan 74'	Stadium: Deepdale; Attendance: 16,924; Referee: Scott Mathieson

28 November 2009	Newcastle United	3–0	Swansea City	Newcastle upon Tyne
15:00 GMT	Harewood 8', 28'; Løvenkrands 21'	(Report)		Stadium: St James' Park; Attendance: 42,616; Referee: Mark Haywood

5 December 2009	Newcastle United	2–0	Watford	Newcastle upon Tyne
15:00 GMT	Løvenkrands 20'; Nolan (yellow card) 27' (yellow-red card) 49'; Pancrate 83'	(Report)		Stadium: St James' Park; Attendance: 43,050; Referee: Jonathan Moss

9 December 2009	Coventry City	0–2	Newcastle United	Coventry
19:45 GMT		(Report)	Ameobi 45+1'; Ranger 82'	Stadium: Ricoh Arena; Attendance: 21,688; Referee: Grant Hegley

12 December 2009	Barnsley	2–2	Newcastle United	Barnsley
15:00 GMT	Hallfreðsson 52'; Hassell 87'	(Report)	Nolan 6'; Harewood 78'	Stadium: Oakwell; Attendance: 20,079; Referee: Graham Salisbury

20 December 2009	Newcastle United	2–0	Middlesbrough	Newcastle upon Tyne
13:00 GMT	Harewood 16'; Ameobi 59'	(Report)		Stadium: St James' Park; Attendance: 49,644; Referee: Kevin Friend

26 December 2009	Sheffield Wednesday	2–2	Newcastle United	Sheffield
12:45 GMT	Varney 14'; O'Connor 59'	(Report)	Nolan 19'; Ameobi 22'	Stadium: Hillsborough Stadium; Attendance: 30,030; Referee: Stuart Atwell

28 December 2009	Newcastle United	0–0	Derby County	Newcastle upon Tyne
17:20 GMT		(Report)	McEveley (yellow card) 33' (yellow-red card) 90+2'	Stadium: St James' Park; Attendance: 47,505; Referee: Kevin Wright

18 January 2010	Newcastle United	2–2	West Bromwich Albion	Newcastle upon Tyne
19:45 GMT	Guthrie 25'; Løvenkrands 54'	(Report)	Olsson 13'; Bednář 46'	Stadium: St James' Park; Attendance: 39,291; Referee: Paul Taylor

27 January 2010	Newcastle United	2–0	Crystal Palace	Newcastle upon Tyne
19:45 GMT	Derry 20' (o.g.); Ranger 90+4'	(Report)		Stadium: St James' Park; Attendance: 37,866; Referee: Russell Booth

30 January 2010	Leicester City	0–0	Newcastle United	Leicester
17:20 GMT	Wellens (yellow card) 17' (yellow-red card) 30'	(Report)		Stadium: Walkers Stadium; Attendance: 29,067; Referee: Andre Marriner

5 February 2010	Newcastle United	5–1	Cardiff City	Newcastle upon Tyne
19:45 GMT	Carroll 3', 15'; Gyepes 6' (o.g.); Løvenkrands 69', 82'	(Report)	Wildig 89'	Stadium: St James' Park; Attendance: 44,028; Referee: Kevin Friend

9 February 2010	Derby County	3–0	Newcastle United	Derby
19:45 GMT	Hulse 40'; Commons 59' (pen.); Barker 64'	(Report)		Stadium: Pride Park Stadium; Attendance: 28,607; Referee: Anthony Taylor

13 February 2010	Swansea City	1–1	Newcastle United	Swansea
12:45 GMT	Cotterill 56'	(Report)	Carroll 87'	Stadium: Liberty Stadium; Attendance: 15,188; Referee: Andy Woolmer

17 February 2010	Newcastle United	4–1	Coventry City	Newcastle upon Tyne
19:45 GMT	Routledge 37'; Carroll 53'; Løvenkrands 70' (pen.); R. Taylor 90+2'	(Report)	Morrison 35'; Barnett (yellow card) 49' (yellow-red card) 69'	Stadium: St James' Park; Attendance: 39,334; Referee: Steve Tanner

20 February 2010	Newcastle United	3–0	Preston North End	Newcastle upon Tyne
15:00 GMT	Løvenkrands 3'; Nolan 55'; R. Taylor 90+1'	(Report)		Stadium: St James' Park; Attendance: 45,525; Referee: Andrew Penn

27 February 2010	Watford	1–2	Newcastle United	Watford
15:00 GMT	Hoskins 90+1'	(Report)	Coloccini 4'; Carroll 50'	Stadium: Vicarage Road; Attendance: 17,120; Referee: Anthony Bates

6 March 2010	Newcastle United	6–1	Barnsley	Newcastle upon Tyne
15:00 GMT	Løvenkrands 44' (pen.), 48'; Guthrie 50', 69'; Gutiérrez 60'; Nolan 71'	(Report)	Steele (red card) 42'; Bogdanović 83'	Stadium: St James' Park; Attendance: 44,464; Referee: Grant Hegley

13 March 2010	Middlesbrough	2–2	Newcastle United	Middlesbrough
15:00 GMT	Robson 36'; McDonald 74'	(Report)	Løvenkrands 16'; Carroll 82'	Stadium: Riverside Stadium; Attendance: 27,342; Referee: Lee Mason

17 March 2010	Newcastle United	3–0	Scunthorpe United	Newcastle upon Tyne
19:45 GMT	Carroll 10', 55'; Løvenkrands 22'	(Report)		Stadium: St James' Park; Attendance: 39,301; Referee: Phil Crossley

20 March 2010	Bristol City	2–2	Newcastle United	Bristol
17:20 GMT	Nyatanga 10'; Maynard 44'	(Report)	Gutiérrez 70'; Carroll 75'	Stadium: Ashton Gate; Attendance: 19,144; Referee: Andy D'Urso

23 March 2010	Doncaster Rovers	0–1	Newcastle United	Doncaster
19:45 GMT		(Report)	Carroll 59'	Stadium: Keepmoat Stadium; Attendance: 14,850; Referee: Keith Hill

29 March 2010	Newcastle United	2–0	Nottingham Forest	Newcastle upon Tyne
19:45 BST	Ameobi 71'; José Enrique 90+1'	(Report)		Stadium: St James' Park; Attendance: 45,987; Referee: Alan Wiley

3 April 2010	Peterborough United	2–3	Newcastle United	Peterborough
15:00 BST	Green 11'; Dickinson 76'	(Report)	Nolan 45+1'; Barton 48'; Ameobi 59'	Stadium: London Road Stadium; Attendance: 12,877; Referee: Mark Haywood

5 April 2010	Newcastle United	2–1	Sheffield United	Newcastle upon Tyne
19:45 BST	Løvenkrands 45' (pen.); Nolan 72'	(Report)	Cresswell 22'	Stadium: St James' Park; Attendance: 48,270; Referee: Andy Hall

10 April 2010	Newcastle United	4–1	Blackpool	Newcastle upon Tyne
15:00 BST	Gutiérrez 12'; Carroll 36'; Nolan 62'; Routledge 77'	(Report)	Ormerod 85'	Stadium: St James' Park; Attendance: 47,010; Referee: Mike Russell

13 April 2010	Reading	1–2	Newcastle United	Reading
20:00 BST	Simpson 72' (o.g.)	(Report)	Nolan 20', 42'	Stadium: Madejski Stadium; Attendance: 23,163; Referee: Fred Graham

19 April 2010	Plymouth Argyle	0–2	Newcastle United	Plymouth
19:45 BST		(Report)	Carroll 20'; Routledge 28'	Stadium: Home Park; Attendance: 13,111; Referee: Craig Pawson

24 April 2010	Newcastle United	2–2	Ipswich Town	Newcastle upon Tyne
15:00 BST	Carroll 27'; Ameobi 84'	(Report)	Wickham 42'; Walters 90+3'	Stadium: St James' Park; Attendance: 52,181; Referee: Carl Boyeson

2 May 2010	Queens Park Rangers	0–1	Newcastle United	London
13:00 BST	Ramage (red card) 46'	(Report)	Løvenkrands 71'	Stadium: Loftus Road; Attendance: 16,819; Referee: Darren Deadman

=== FA Cup ===
2 January 2010 Round 3	Plymouth Argyle	0–0	Newcastle United	Plymouth
15:00 GMT		(Report)		Stadium: Home Park; Attendance: 16,451; Referee: Alan Wiley

13 January 2010 R3 Replay	Newcastle United	3–0	Plymouth Argyle	Newcastle upon Tyne
19:45 GMT	Løvenkrands 10', 40', 72'	(Report)		Stadium: St James' Park; Attendance: 15,805; Referee: Andy D'Urso

23 January 2010 Round 4	West Bromwich Albion	4–2	Newcastle United	West Bromwich
15:00 GMT	Olsson 17'; Dorrans 31' (pen.), 72' (pen.); Thomas 76'	(Report)	Carroll 62', 90+1'	Stadium: The Hawthorns; Attendance: 16,102; Referee: James Linnington

=== League Cup ===
26 August 2009 Round 2	Newcastle United	4–3	Huddersfield Town	Newcastle upon Tyne
19:45 BST	Guthrie 36'; Geremi 48'; Ameobi 64' (pen.); Nolan 84'	(Report)	Robinson 37', 39' (pen.); Rhodes 47'	Stadium: St James' Park; Attendance: 23,815; Referee: Tony Bates

22 September 2009 Round 3	Peterborough United	2–0	Newcastle United	Peterborough
19:45 BST	Mackail-Smith 20'; Williams 31'	(Report)	Guthrie (yellow card) 55' (yellow-red card)	Stadium: London Road Stadium; Attendance: 10,298; Referee: Keith Stroud
