= 2008–09 Newcastle United F.C. season =

Newcastle United
2008–09 season
- Managing director(s): Chris Mort; Derek Llambias
- Manager: Kevin Keegan (until 4 September); Chris Hughton (4–26 September, 7 February – 1 April); Joe Kinnear (26 September – 7 February); Alan Shearer (1 April – 24 May)
- Premier League: 18th (relegated)
- FA Cup: Third round
- League Cup: Third round
- Top goalscorer: League: Michael Owen; Obafemi Martins (8 each); All: Michael Owen (10)
- Highest home attendance: 52,114 (vs. Liverpool and Fulham, 28 December 2008 and 16 May 2009)
- Lowest home attendance: 20,577 (vs Tottenham Hotspur, 24 September 2008)
Home colours	Away colours	Third colours

The 2008–09 season was Newcastle United's 16th consecutive season in the top division of English football. This season saw the club relegated from the Premier League to the Championship, the first time the club had been relegated since 1989.

Things had looked reasonable for Newcastle at the start of the new season, but a major falling out between Kevin Keegan and the board saw Keegan resign as manager. This led to an awful run of form under caretaker manager Chris Hughton and the surprise appointment of Joe Kinnear was made to try to help the team out. A health scare saw Kinnear have to leave his office as manager in February. Under Hughton and Colin Calderwood, the club went on another horrible run of form as they were sucked deeper into the relegation battle. Ex-player Alan Shearer was appointed as a temporary manager for the last eight matches of the season but he was only able to win one of these games and Newcastle were relegated.

== Season summary ==
=== Keegan resigns ===
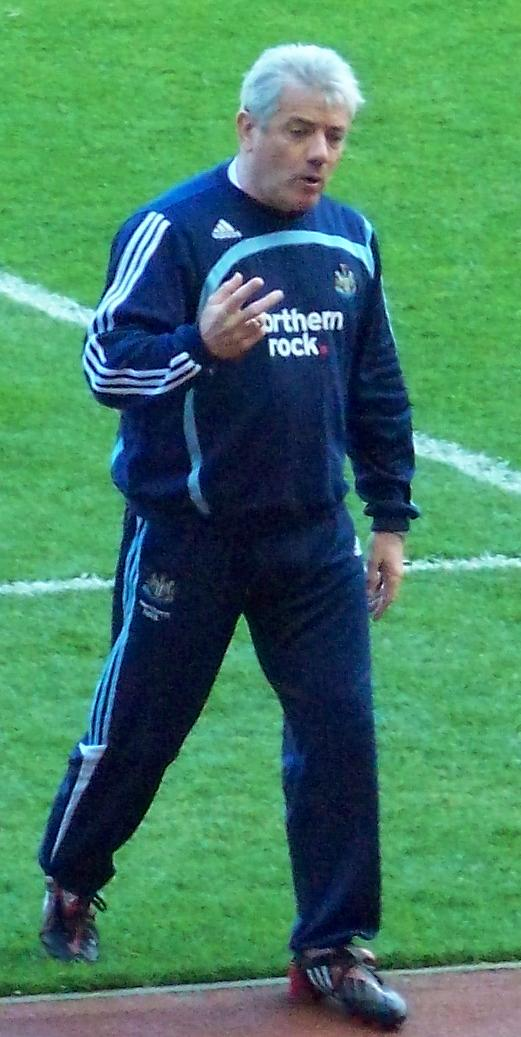
Kevin Keegan

In the summer transfer window, Newcastle United signed Jonás Gutiérrez, Danny Guthrie, Sébastien Bassong and Fabricio Coloccini. There were also a number of departures from the first team, most notably that of James Milner to Aston Villa, whose departure was rumoured to have sparked disagreements between Keegan and the board, with Keegan claiming he was not consulted about his contract renewal. Shortly after the Arsenal game on 30 August, Spanish under-21 international Xisco was unveiled at St James' Park by Director of Football Dennis Wise.

On 1 September, there were widespread media reports that Keegan had either resigned or been sacked. While these reports were revealed to be premature, Keegan did tender his resignation on 4 September, citing fury over a lack of control over transfers and interference from the board, reflecting upon the sale of James Milner and the arrival of Xisco, a player he claimed to have known nothing about. Many Newcastle fans were furious with the perceived mistreatment of Keegan; public anger was directed at owner Mike Ashley, Executive Director Dennis Wise, Vice-Chairman Tony Jimenez and Chairman Derek Llambias, who were perceived to have forced Keegan out of the club.

Shortly after Keegan's departure, the League Managers Association warned Newcastle United to develop a structure which would satisfy the next manager to avoid a similar situation occurring again. They also reported that Keegan would consider a return to the club should they develop a structure he would be happy with. The club hit back at the allegations, claiming Keegan was aware of the structure when he joined. In December, however, following reports that Ashley was set to end his bid to sell United, it was reported that a legal battle was commencing between Ashley and Keegan, with Ashley rumoured to be claiming damage to his public image and Keegan claiming for breach of contract, following backing from the League Managers Association.

=== Joe Kinnear ===
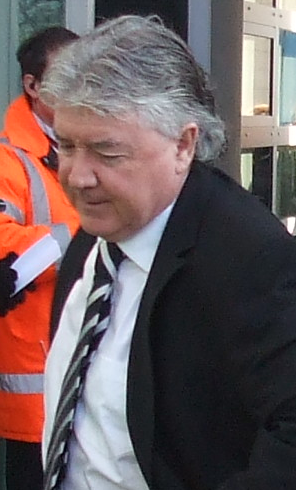
Joe Kinnear in January 2009

Assistant manager Chris Hughton took over as caretaker manager for several weeks, during which Newcastle remained winless in all three of their matches. On 26 September, Hughton was replaced by Joe Kinnear as "interim manager." Kinnear's appointment proved completely unimpressive with the fans and resulted in Kinnear profusely verbally abusing and swearing at the media upon his first media interview. He then announced he would not speak to any national press again and would only speak with the local media. In his first two matches in charge, Newcastle managed 2–2 draws with Everton and Manchester City, coming from behind both times (the latter with ten men).

In the last week of January, key players Shay Given and Charles N'Zogbia left, causing an already thin squad to lose more talent. Amongst ongoing criticism of the club board following Keegan's departure, Joe Kinnear managed five wins, ten draws, and 11 losses, and talks opened between Joe Kinnear and the board as to whether he would consider a full-time position the following season. On 7 February, however, the club's horrid season took another major blow when Kinnear was admitted to hospital following heart problems, and Chris Hughton once again took charge of the team, this time with the help of Colin Calderwood. By the end of March, the club was struggling to find form and keep pace with the opposition. With scarce wins over the course of the season, the team now faced a relegation battle.

=== Alan Shearer ===
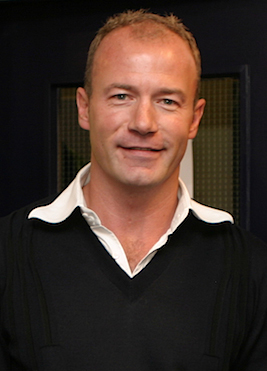
Alan Shearer

Keeping to his decision not to rush Kinnear back into his role too shortly after his surgery, Mike Ashley brought in club icon Alan Shearer to take over from Kinnear as the club's interim manager on 1 April. As Shearer's appointment was announced, Dennis Wise resigned as director of football and the club announced there were no plans to replace him in the role. Shearer hired Iain Dowie as his assistant coach and began his reign as caretaker manager, losing 0–2 to Chelsea at St James' Park and drawing 1–1 away at Stoke City. After losing 1–0 to Tottenham Hotspur at White Hart Lane and drawing 0–0 at home with Portsmouth, the club was plunged even deeper into the tight relegation fight. The ignominious 3–0 loss to title-chasing Liverpool at Anfield on 3 May, with Joey Barton being sent off on 77 minutes for a dangerous tackle, left the club in 18th place. Shearer recorded his first victory as manager on 11 May, defeating fellow strugglers Middlesbrough 3–1, lifting the club out of the relegation zone to 17th place on goal difference.

The feel-good factor did not last, however, as the following week, Newcastle slumped to a 0–1 home defeat to Fulham to fall back in the relegation zone with only the away game to Aston Villa left to play. This left the club needing to better the results of Hull City and Sunderland to avoid relegation. Despite Sunderland, Hull and Middlesbrough all losing their matches, Newcastle United were relegated to the Championship for the first time since 1993 after a 1–0 defeat to Aston Villa.

The club was then placed for sale by Ashley, who noted the club's terrible season following bad decisions on his part, which he believed led the club into major financial loss and constant criticism following relegation. Ashley said, "It has been catastrophic for everybody. I've lost my money and I've made terrible decisions. Now I want to sell it as soon as I can." Newcastle released an official statement on the club's sale, including a press phone number and email address which was quickly made further public by the national press, although the address provided was merely for general enquiries. This resulted in a large number of hoax bids being sent, most of which were made by rival Sunderland supporters. More controversy was once again caused by Dennis Wise, who claimed the club were still paying him £80,000 a month despite his departure in April, and claimed it was a factor in why Ashley was struggling to sell the club.

=== Compensation to Keegan ===
On 2 October, a Premier League arbitration panel ruled in favour of Kevin Keegan on his dispute with the club. The club confessed that they had lied to the media, public and staff, and that their correspondence on Keegan's departure was just "PR". Keegan confirmed his delight at the outcome, stating he felt the £2 million pay-out + interest fully justified his departure and mistreatment by the club. Dennis Wise announced to the press that he did not feel solely responsible for the situation that developed at the club, but yet did not wish to contradict or debate Keegan's accusations, although he announced deep sorrow over the situation and felt his career has been left "in tatters".

The panel ruled in Keegan's favour, citing that player Nacho González was signed by Dennis Wise against Keegan's wishes, but also against the principles of the generally understood role of a Premier League manager, which usually states the manager has the final decision on player signings. The panel revealed that Wise asked Keegan to review González from YouTube, no more than 24 hours before the closing of the summer transfer window, from which Keegan refuted the player. The club revealed to the panel that Keegan had never been informed his word was not final and that they were not in a position to sack him should he not have agreed to their demands.

Keegan rejected talk of a third return to the club, feeling the fans had "had enough," leaving the role open for Chris Hughton to become full-time manager.

== Final league table ==
Pos	Team	Pld	W	D	L	GF	GA	GD	Pts	Qualification or relegation
16	Sunderland	38	9	9	20	34	54	−20	36	
17	Hull City	38	8	11	19	39	64	−25	35	
18	Newcastle United (R)	38	7	13	18	40	59	−19	34	Relegation to Football League Championship
19	Middlesbrough (R)	38	7	11	20	28	57	−29	32	Relegation to Football League Championship
20	West Bromwich Albion (R)	38	8	8	22	36	67	−31	32	Relegation to Football League Championship

Source: Barclays Premier League
Rules for classification: 1) points; 2) goal difference; 3) number of goals scored.
(R) Relegated

== Team kit ==
The team kit for the 2008–09 season was produced by Adidas and Northern Rock remained as the main sponsor. The home kit remained the same for the season while the new away kit was revealed to the public on 20 June 2008.

== Managers ==
- (England) Kevin Keegan (until 4 September 2008; resigned)
- (Republic of Ireland) Chris Hughton (6 September 2008 – 26 September 2008; caretaker)
- (Republic of Ireland) Joe Kinnear (26 September 2008 – 16 February 2009; due to ill health)
- (Scotland) Colin Calderwood/ (Republic of Ireland) Chris Hughton (16 February 2009 – 31 March 2009; caretakers)
- (England) Alan Shearer (31 March 2009 – 24 May 2009)

== Players ==
=== First-team ===
Note: Flags indicate national team as defined under FIFA eligibility rules; some limited exceptions apply. Players may hold more than one non-FIFA nationality.

No.	Pos.	Nation	Player
2	DF	ARG	Fabricio Coloccini
3	DF	ESP	José Enrique
4	MF	ENG	Kevin Nolan
6	DF	BRA	Caçapa
7	MF	ENG	Joey Barton
8	MF	ENG	Danny Guthrie
9	FW	NGR	Obafemi Martins
10	FW	ENG	Michael Owen
11	MF	IRL	Damien Duff
12	DF	CMR	Sébastien Bassong
13	GK	ENG	Steve Harper
15	MF	URU	Nacho Gonzalez (on loan from Valencia)
16	DF	ENG	Ryan Taylor

No.	Pos.	Nation	Player
17	FW	ENG	Alan Smith
18	MF	ARG	Jonás Gutiérrez
19	FW	ESP	Xisco
20	MF	CMR	Geremi Njitap
21	DF	SEN	Habib Beye
22	MF	ENG	Nicky Butt
23	FW	ENG	Shola Ameobi
24	FW	DEN	Peter Løvenkrands
27	DF	ENG	Steven Taylor
30	DF	CAN	David Edgar
36	FW	AUS	Mark Viduka
38	MF	COD	Kazenga LuaLua
39	FW	ENG	Andy Carroll

=== Left club during season ===
Note: Flags indicate national team as defined under FIFA eligibility rules; some limited exceptions apply. Players may hold more than one non-FIFA nationality.

No.	Pos.	Nation	Player
1	GK	IRL	Shay Given (to Manchester City)
14	MF	FRA	Charles N'Zogbia (to Wigan Athletic)

No.	Pos.	Nation	Player
16	MF	ENG	James Milner (to Aston Villa)
29	MF	ITA	Fabio Zamblera (on loan to Sampdoria)

=== Reserve squad ===
The following players made most of their appearances for the reserve team this season, and did not appear for the first team, but may have been named as a substitute.

Note: Flags indicate national team as defined under FIFA eligibility rules; some limited exceptions apply. Players may hold more than one non-FIFA nationality.

No.	Pos.	Nation	Player
28	DF	HUN	Tamás Kádár
31	FW	NED	Frank Wiafe Danquah
32	FW	FRA	Wesley Ngo Baheng
34	GK	ENG	Fraser Forster
35	DF	ENG	Ben Tozer
37	DF	IRL	Callum Morris
40	GK	NED	Tim Krul

No.	Pos.	Nation	Player
41	MF	ENG	Mark Doninger
42	FW	ENG	Ryan Donaldson
43	MF	ENG	Jonny Godsmark
44	MF	ENG	James Marwood
45	DF	ENG	Darren Lough
46	FW	ENG	Nile Ranger

=== Under-18 squad ===
The following players made most of their appearances for the under-18 team this season, but may have also appeared for the reserves.

Note: Flags indicate national team as defined under FIFA eligibility rules; some limited exceptions apply. Players may hold more than one non-FIFA nationality.

No.	Pos.	Nation	Player
33	GK	SWE	Ole Söderberg
47	MF	AUS	Bradden Inman
—	GK	ENG	Jak Alnwick
—	GK	ENG	Andreas Arestidou
—	GK	ENG	Max Johnson
—	GK	ENG	Ben Robinson
—	DF	ENG	Paul Dummett
—	DF	ENG	Matthew Grieve
—	DF	ENG	Jeff Henderson
—	DF	ENG	Daniel Leadbitter
—	DF	ENG	James Tavernier
—	DF	ENG	James Taylor
—	DF	NIR	Shane Ferguson
—	DF	IRL	Stephen Folan
—	DF	COD	Patrick Nzuzi
—	MF	ENG	Sammy Ameobi
—	MF	ENG	Greg McDermott

No.	Pos.	Nation	Player
—	MF	ENG	Ryan McGorrigan
—	MF	ENG	Conor Newton
—	MF	ENG	Ryan Page
—	MF	ENG	Daniel Williams
—	MF	ENG	Kieran Wrightson
—	MF	NIR	Paddy McLaughlin
—	MF	SLO	Haris Vučkić
—	MF	COD	Andy Mogwo
—	FW	ENG	Phil Airey
—	FW	ENG	Campbell Bell
—	FW	ENG	Dan Neary
—	FW	ENG	Aaron Spear
—	FW	NIR	Michael McCrudden
—	FW	SWE	Samuel Adjei
—		ENG	Stewart Bath
—	DF	ENG	Richard Archer
—		ENG	Stephen Foster

=== Trialists ===
The following players came to Newcastle as trialists this season.

Note: Flags indicate national team as defined under FIFA eligibility rules; some limited exceptions apply. Players may hold more than one non-FIFA nationality.

No.	Pos.	Nation	Player
—		BUL	Ivan Stoyanov (on trial from Levski Sofia)
—	DF	BUL	Ivan Goranov (on trial from Levski Sofia)
—	DF	BUL	Georgi Terziev (on trial from Naftex)
—	DF	POL	Lukasz Kominiak (on trial from Wisła Kraków)
—	DF	NOR	Aleksander Solli (on trial from Løv-Ham)
—	DF	GUI	Kamil Zayatte (on trial from Young Boys)

No.	Pos.	Nation	Player
—	FW	DEN	Kevin Mensah (on trial from Viborg FF)
—	MF	HUN	András Gosztonyi (on trial from MTK)
—	DF	FIN	Jukka Raitala (on trial from HJK Helsinki)
—	DF	ALG	Ahmed-Reda Madouni
—	DF	SVK	Ľubomír Korijkov (on trial from MFK Košice)
—	DF	BRA	Dionatan Teixeira (on trial from MFK Košice)

== Chronological list of events ==
- 6 June 2008: David Rozehnal was sold to Lazio.
- 17 June 2008: Managing director Chris Mort stepped down as chairman and was replaced, as expected, by Derek Llambias.
- 24 June 2008: Richard Money was appointed new Academy Director.
- 30 June 2008: Stephen Carr, Peter Ramage and James Troisi left the club after contract expiry.
- 2 July 2008: Jonás Gutiérrez was signed from Mallorca.
- 4 July 2008: Steven Taylor signed a three-year extension.
- 11 July 2008: Danny Guthrie was signed from Liverpool.
- 14 July 2008: Sébastien Bassong from Metz was taken on trial for a week.
- 14 July 2008: Emre Belözoğlu was sold to Fenerbahçe.
- 16 July 2008: Robbie Elliott returned to the club to work as strength and conditioning coach alongside senior fitness coach, Mark Hulse.
- 16 July 2008: Alan Thompson joined the coaching staff as new academy coach.
- 30 July 2008: Sébastien Bassong came one step closer to being a Newcastle player when a fee was agreed between Newcastle United and Metz.
- 7 August 2008: Arthur Cox resigned as assistant manager and returned to his retirement from football.
- 15 August 2008: Fabricio Coloccini became a Newcastle United player, signing a five-year contract.
- 15 August 2008: Abdoulaye Faye was sold to Stoke City.
- 20 August 2008: Shola Ameobi's proposed move to Ipswich Town failed due to injury problem.
- 27 August 2008: James Milner handed in a written transfer request.
- 29 August 2008: James Milner was sold to Aston Villa for a fee of £12 million.
- 29 August 2008: Kamil Zayatte from Young Boys was training with the first-team squad.
- 1 September 2008: Nacho González from Valencia was taken on a season-long loan deal.
- 1 September 2008: Xisco was signed from Deportivo de La Coruña.
- 2 September 2008: Kevin Keegan was rumoured to have resigned or been sacked as manager but official statements from the club later denied those speculations.
- 4 September 2008: Kevin Keegan resigned as manager after several days of discussions with the board.
- 5 September 2008: Anil Ambani was again rumored to be interested in a £220 million take over and bring Kevin Keegan back.
- 6 September 2008: Chris Hughton was named caretaker manager following the departures of Terry McDermott and Adam Sadler.
- 8 September 2008: Ray Gooding was appointed academy scout joining from Coventry City.
- 14 September 2008: Mike Ashley announced his intention to sell club following a series of protests by Newcastle supporters angry at Kevin Keegan's departure.
- 17 September 2008: Mike Ashley was rumored to have snubbed a £200M bid for the club from Dubai-based Zabeel Investments, instead demanding £481M.
- 22 September 2008: Keith Harris from Seymour Pierce was appointed to act on the potential sale of the club by the board.
- 23 September 2008: A Nigerian consortium was rumored to line up a £350M. take over bid and bring Kevin Keegan back.
- 26 September 2008: Joe Kinnear named interim manager.
- 9 October 2008: Tony Jimenez left the club to pursue other interests.
- 25 October 2008: Newcastle lost away to Sunderland for the first time in 28 years.
- 28 November 2008: Joe Kinnear announced as manager until the end of the season.
- 14 December 2008: Newcastle United claimed their first away victory of the season with a 3–0 win over Portsmouth with goals from Michael Owen, Obafemi Martins and Danny Guthrie
- 28 December 2008: The sale of the club was called off by Mike Ashley.
- 12 January 2009: Peter Løvenkrands was taken on trial for a week.
- 23 January 2009: Peter Løvenkrands signed until the end of the season.
- 26 January 2009: Colin Calderwood joined as a first-team coach until the end of the season.
- 30 January 2009: Kevin Nolan signed from Bolton Wanderers on a four-and-a-half-year deal.
- 1 February 2009: Shay Given was sold to Manchester City.
- 2 February 2009: Ryan Taylor signed from Wigan Athletic with Charles N'Zogbia going in the other direction.
- 13 February 2009: Joe Kinnear underwent a triple heart bypass operation.
- 27 March 2009: Peter Beardsley returned to Newcastle once again to coach players at the academy.
- 1 April 2009: Alan Shearer was announced as temporary manager, to fill in for Kinnear until the end of the 2008–09 season.
- 1 April 2009: Dennis Wise resigned from his post as Executive Director (Football) following Alan Shearer's appointment as temporary manager.
- 1 April 2009: Iain Dowie was announced as new assistant manager while Colin Calderwood and Chris Hughton would continue in their coaching roles.
- 3 April 2009: Paul Ferris returned to the club to be part of Shearer's backroom staff working as physio.
- 24 May 2009: Newcastle United relegated to The Championship after a 1–0 loss away to Aston Villa.
- 26 May 2009: Alan Shearer was rumoured to be offered a new four-year deal by Newcastle United, becoming permanent manager of the team.
- 30 May 2009: Around 150 full and part-time employees of the club were expected to be laid off due to the relegation, including coach Colin Calderwood and Executive Director of Operations David Williamson.
- 31 May 2009: Mike Ashley reportedly put the club up for sale with a £100M price tag.
- 1 June 2009: A foreign-based group is believed to have talks regarding a £80M takeover. Another group is also interested. Former chairman Freddy Shepherd is not involved with any of the groups so far.
- 8 June 2009: The club is officially put up for sale for £100M confirmed through a club statement.
- 12 June 2009: Several groups and consortiums are reported in talks with the club regarding a take over, including Singapore-based Profitable Group.

== Statistics ==
=== Appearances, goals and cards ===
(Substitute appearances in brackets)

No.	Pos.	Name	League		FA Cup		League Cup		Total		Discipline	
No.	Pos.	Name	Apps	Goals	Apps	Goals	Apps	Goals	Apps	Goals	Yellow card	Red card
1	GK	(Republic of Ireland) Shay Given	22	0	2	0	2	0	26	0	2	0
2	DF	(Argentina) Fabricio Coloccini	34	0	2	0	2	0	38	0	5	0
3	DF	(Spain) José Enrique	24+2	0	1	0	1	0	26+2	0	1	0
4	MF	(England) Kevin Nolan	10+1	0	0	0	0	0	10+1	0	2	1
6	DF	(Brazil) Caçapa	4+2	0	0	0	1	0	5+2	0	0	0
7	MF	(England) Joey Barton	6+3	1	0	0	0	0	6+3	1	2	1
8	MF	(England) Danny Guthrie	21+3	2	2	0	1	0	24+3	2	3	1
9	FW	(Nigeria) Obafemi Martins	21+3	8	0	0	1	0	22+3	8	1	0
10	FW	(England) Michael Owen (C)	21+7	8	2	0	1+1	2	24+8	10	0	0
11	MF	(Republic of Ireland) Damien Duff	28+2	3	2	0	1	0	31+2	3	4	0
12	DF	(France) Sébastien Bassong	26+4	0	2	0	2	0	30+4	0	3	2
13	GK	(England) Steve Harper	16	0	0	0	0	0	16	0	0	0
14	MF	(France) Charles N'Zogbia	14+4	1	2	0	2	0	18+4	1	2	0
15	MF	(Uruguay) Nacho González	0+2	0	0	0	0	0	0+2	0	0	0
16	MF	(England) James Milner	2	0	0	0	1	1	3	1	0	0
16	DF	(England) Ryan Taylor	8+2	0	0	0	0	0	8+2	0	4	0
17	FW	(England) Alan Smith	4+2	0	0	0	0	0	4+2	0	2	0
18	MF	(Argentina) Jonás Gutiérrez	23+7	0	1+1	0	1	0	25+8	0	7	0
19	FW	(Spain) Xisco	3+2	1	1	0	0+1	0	4+3	1	0	0
20	MF	(Cameroon) Geremi	11+4	0	0	0	2	0	13+4	0	2	0
21	DF	(Senegal) Habib Beye	22+1	0	0	0	1	0	23+1	0	3	1
22	MF	(England) Nicky Butt	33	0	2	0	2	0	37	0	9	1
23	FW	(Nigeria) Shola Ameobi	14+8	4	0	0	0	0	14+8	4	1	0
24	FW	(Denmark) Peter Løvenkrands	8+4	3	0	0	0	0	8+4	3	0	0
27	DF	(England) Steven Taylor	25+2	4	1	0	1	0	27+2	4	6	0
30	DF	(Canada) David Edgar	7+4	1	1	0	0+1	0	8+5	1	3	1
36	FW	(Australia) Mark Viduka	6+6	0	0	0	0	0	6+6	0	0	0
38	MF	(Democratic Republic of the Congo) Kazenga LuaLua	0+3	0	0+1	0	0	0	0+4	0	0	0
39	FW	(England) Andy Carroll	5+9	3	1+1	0	0	0	6+10	3	2	0

=== Starting formations ===
Formation	League	FA Cup	League Cup	Total
4–4–2	34	2	1	37
4–3–3	3	0	1	4
4–4–1–1	1	0	0	1

=== Captains ===
No.	Pos.	Name	Starts
10	FW	(England) Michael Owen	24
22	MF	(England) Nicky Butt	16
13	GK	(England) Steve Harper	1
1	GK	(Republic of Ireland) Shay Given	1

=== Coaching staff ===
Position	Staff
Manager	(England) Alan Shearer
Assistant Manager	(Northern Ireland) Iain Dowie
Assistant Manager	(Republic of Ireland) Chris Hughton
First Team coach	(Scotland) Colin Calderwood
Goalkeeping Coach	(England) Paul Barron
Development Coach	(Scotland) Willie Donachie
Reserve Team Coach	(England) Alan Thompson
Chief scout	(England) Arthur Cox

Last updated: 3 May 2011

== Transfers ==
=== In ===
Date	Pos.	Name	From	Fee
2 July 2008	MF	(Argentina) Jonás Gutiérrez	(Spain) Mallorca	Undisclosed (exp. EUR 2,600,000)
11 July 2008	MF	(England) Danny Guthrie	(England) Liverpool	Undisclosed (exp. £2,500,000)
30 July 2008	DF	(Cameroon) Sébastien Bassong	(France) Metz	Undisclosed (exp. £1,800,000)
15 August 2008	DF	(Argentina) Fabricio Coloccini	(Spain) Deportivo La Coruña	Undisclosed (exp. £10,000,000)
1 September 2008	FW	(Spain) Xisco	(Spain) Deportivo La Coruña	Undisclosed (exp. £5,700,000)
23 January 2009	FW	(Denmark) Peter Løvenkrands	(Germany) Schalke 04	Free
30 January 2009	MF	(England) Kevin Nolan	(England) Bolton Wanderers	£4,000,000
2 February 2009	DF	(England) Ryan Taylor	(England) Wigan Athletic	Part-exchange for Charles N'Zogbia

- Total spending: ▼ ~ £26,000,000

=== Out ===
Date	Pos.	Name	To	Fee
10 June 2008	DF	(Czech Republic) David Rozehnal	(Italy) Lazio	£2,900,000
30 June 2008	DF	(England) Peter Ramage	(England) Queens Park Rangers	Free
30 June 2008	DF	(Republic of Ireland) Stephen Carr	(England) Birmingham City	Free
30 June 2008	MF	(Australia) James Troisi	(Turkey) Gençlerbirliği	Free
14 July 2008	MF	(Turkey) Emre Belözoğlu	(Turkey) Fenerbahçe	£3,800,000
15 August 2008	DF	(Senegal) Abdoulaye Faye	(England) Stoke City	£2,250,000
29 August 2008	MF	(England) James Milner	(England) Aston Villa	£12,000,000
1 February 2009	GK	(Republic of Ireland) Shay Given	(England) Manchester City	£5,900,000
2 February 2009	MF	(France) Charles N'Zogbia	(England) Wigan Athletic	Undisclosed (exp. £6,000,000) + Ryan Taylor

- Total income: ▲ ~ £32,850,000

=== Loans in ===
Date	Pos.	Name	From	Expiry
1 September 2008	MF	(Uruguay) Nacho González	(Spain) Valencia	30 June 2009

=== Loans out ===
Date	Pos.	Name	To	Expiry
1 October 2008	GK	(England) Fraser Forster	(England) Stockport County	1 November 2008
21 November 2008	GK	(Netherlands) Tim Krul	(England) Carlisle United	21 January 2009
2 February 2008	FW	(Italy) Fabio Zamblera	(Italy) Sampdoria	30 June 2009
26 March 2009	MF	(Democratic Republic of the Congo) Kazenga LuaLua	(England) Doncaster Rovers	4 May 2009

== Competitions ==
Win Draw Loss

=== Pre-season ===
Match	1	2	3	4	5	6
Result	4–1	0–1	0–1	0–1	2–2	2–1

=== League ===
Round	1	2	3	4	5	6	7	8	9	10	11	12	13	14	15	16	17	18	19
Result	1–1	1–0	0–3	1–2	1–3	0–2	2–2	2–2	1–2	2–1	2–0	1–2	2–2	0–0	0–0	2–2	3–0	2–1	1–2
Position	11th	4th	9th	15th	19th	19th	18th	19th	19th	19th	14th	18th	17th	18th	17th	17th	14th	12th	12th

Round	20	21	22	23	24	25	26	27	28	29	30	31	32	33	34	35	36	37	38
Result	1–5	2–2	0–3	1–2	1–1	3–2	0–0	0–1	1–2	1–1	1–3	0–2	1–1	0–1	0–0	0–3	3–1	0–1	0–1
Position	14th	11th	14th	16th	15th	13th	14th	15th	16th	16th	18th	18th	18th	19th	18th	18th	17th	18th	18th

=== FA Cup ===
Match	1	2
Result	0–0	0–1

=== League Cup ===
Match	1	2
Result	3–2	1–2

== Matches ==
=== Pre-season ===
19 July 2008	Hartlepool	1–4	Newcastle United	Victoria Park
15:00 BST	Robson 16'	(Report)	Duff 40', 52', 87'; Guthrie 53'	Attendance: 4,249; Referee: Graham Laws

26 July 2008	Doncaster Rovers	1–0	Newcastle United	Keepmoat Stadium
15:00 BST	Elliott 87'	(Report)		Attendance: 9,826; Referee: Rob Shoebridge

1 August 2008	Hertha BSC	1–0	Newcastle United	ONO Estadi
21:00 BST	Nicu 80'	(Report)		Attendance: ~2,000; Referee: Ivan Gonzalez

3 August 2008	Mallorca	1–0	Newcastle United	ONO Estadi
23:00 BST	Suárez 6'	(Report)		Attendance: ~2,000; Referee: Ángel Rodada Rodríguez

6 August 2008	Newcastle United	2–2	PSV	St James' Park, Newcastle upon Tyne
19:45 BST	Taylor 3'; Guthrie 8'	(Report)	Afellay 32'; Amrabat 71'	Attendance: 13,477; Referee: Chris Foy

9 August 2008	Newcastle United	2–1	Valencia	St James' Park, Newcastle upon Tyne
17:00 BST	Duff 77'; Milner 90+1'	(Report)	Joaquín 38'	Attendance: 31,494; Referee: Uriah Rennie

=== Premier League ===
17 August 2008	Manchester United	1–1	Newcastle United	Old Trafford, Manchester
16:00 BST	Fletcher 24'; Campbell (yellow card) 78'; Brown (yellow card) 81'; Rooney (yellow card) 90'	(Report)	Martins 22'	Attendance: 75,512; Referee: Mike Riley

23 August 2008	Newcastle United	1–0	Bolton Wanderers	St James' Park, Newcastle upon Tyne
15:00 BST	Owen 71'	(Report)		Attendance: 47,711; Referee: Steve Bennett

30 August 2008	Arsenal	3–0	Newcastle United	Emirates Stadium, London
17:30 BST	Van Persie 18' (pen.), 41'; Fàbregas (yellow card) 52'; Denílson 59'; Nasri (yellow card) 90+2'	(Report)	(yellow card) 28' Coloccini; (yellow card) 52' Given	Attendance: 60,067; Referee: Rob Styles

13 September 2008	Newcastle United	1–2	Hull City	St James' Park, Newcastle upon Tyne
15:00 BST	Xisco 82'; Guthrie (red card) 90+6'	(Report)	King 34' (pen.), 55'	Attendance: 50,242; Referee: Andre Marriner

20 September 2008	West Ham United	3–1	Newcastle United	Boleyn Ground, London
15:00 BST	Di Michele 8', 37'; Etherington 53'	(Report)	Owen 67'	Attendance: 34,743; Referee: Phil Dowd

27 September 2008	Newcastle United	1–2	Blackburn Rovers	St James' Park, Newcastle upon Tyne
15:00 BST	Owen 51' (pen.)	(Report)	Samba 31'; Santa Cruz 41'	Attendance: 44,937; Referee: Steve Tanner

5 October 2008	Everton	2–2	Newcastle United	Goodison Park, Liverpool
16:00 BST	Arteta 17' (pen.); Fellaini 35'	(Report)	S. Taylor 45'; Duff 47'	Attendance: 33,805; Referee: Howard Webb

20 October 2008	Newcastle United	2–2	Manchester City	St James' Park, Newcastle upon Tyne
20:00 BST	Beye (red card) 12'; Ameobi 44'; Dunne 63' (o.g.)	(Report)	Robinho 14' (pen.); Ireland 86'	Attendance: 45,908; Referee: Rob Styles

25 October 2008	Sunderland	2–1	Newcastle United	Stadium of Light, Sunderland
13:00 BST	Cissé 20'; Richardson 78'	(Report)	Ameobi 30'	Attendance: 47,936; Referee: Mike Riley

28 October 2008	Newcastle United	2–1	West Brom	St James' Park, Newcastle upon Tyne
19:45 GMT	Barton 9' (pen.); Martins 42'	(Report)	Miller 65'	Attendance: 45,801; Referee: Mike Dean

3 November 2008	Newcastle United	2–0	Aston Villa	St James' Park, Newcastle upon Tyne
20:00 GMT	Martins 60', 83'	(Report)		Attendance: 44,567; Referee: Steve Bennett

9 November 2008	Fulham	2–1	Newcastle United	Craven Cottage, London
16:00 GMT	Johnson 23'; Murphy 66' (pen.)	(Report)	Ameobi 57'	Attendance: 24,740; Referee: Martin Atkinson

15 November 2008	Newcastle United	2–2	Wigan Athletic	St James' Park, Newcastle upon Tyne
15:00 GMT	Owen 80'; Martins 87'	(Report)	R. Taylor 3'; Boyce (red card) 54'; Bramble 89'	Attendance: 47,657; Referee: Andre Marriner

22 November 2008	Chelsea	0–0	Newcastle United	Stamford Bridge, London
15:00 GMT		(Report)		Attendance: 41,660; Referee: Phil Dowd

29 November 2008	Middlesbrough	0–0	Newcastle United	Riverside Stadium, Middlesbrough
15:00 GMT		(Report)		Attendance: 32,160; Referee: Alan Wiley

6 December 2008	Newcastle United	2–2	Stoke City	St James' Park, Newcastle upon Tyne
15:00 GMT	Owen 8', 24'	(Report)	Sidibe 60'; Faye 90+1'	Attendance: 47,422; Referee: Mike Riley

14 December 2008	Portsmouth	0–3	Newcastle United	Fratton Park, Portsmouth
13:30 GMT		(Report)	Owen 52'; Martins 77'; Guthrie 89'	Attendance: 19,416; Referee: Chris Foy

21 December 2008	Newcastle United	2–1	Tottenham Hotspur	St James' Park, Newcastle upon Tyne
15:00 GMT	N'Zogbia 12'; Duff 90'	(Report)	Modrić 28'	Attendance: 47,982; Referee: Andre Marriner

26 December 2008	Wigan Athletic	2–1	Newcastle United	JJB Stadium, Wigan
15:00 GMT	R. Taylor 29'; Zaki 73' (pen.)	(Report)	Bassong (red card) 72'; Guthrie 88' (pen.)	Attendance: 20.266; Referee: Mike Dean

28 December 2008	Newcastle United	1–5	Liverpool	St James' Park, Newcastle upon Tyne
12:00 GMT	Edgar 45+2'	(Report)	Gerrard 31', 66'; Hyypiä 36'; Babel 50'; Alonso 77' (pen.)	Attendance: 52,114; Referee: Mark Halsey

10 January 2009	Newcastle United	2–2	West Ham United	St James' Park, Newcastle upon Tyne
15:00 GMT	Owen 19'; Carroll 78'	(Report)	Bellamy 29'; Cole 55'	Attendance: 47,571; Referee: Alan Wiley

17 January 2009	Blackburn Rovers	3–0	Newcastle United	Ewood Park, Blackburn
15:00 GMT	McCarthy 61' (pen.); Roberts 66', 86'	(Report)	Butt (red card) 83'	Attendance: 25,583; Referee: Rob Styles

28 January 2009	Manchester City	2–1	Newcastle United	City of Manchester Stadium, Manchester
19:45 GMT	Wright-Phillips 17'; Bellamy 77'	(Report)	Carroll 81'	Attendance: 42,280; Referee: Michael Jones

1 February 2009	Newcastle United	1–1	Sunderland	St James' Park, Newcastle upon Tyne
13:30 GMT	Ameobi 68' (pen.)	(Report)	Cissé 32'	Attendance: 52,084; Referee: Howard Webb

7 February 2009	West Bromwich Albion	2–3	Newcastle United	The Hawthorns, West Bromwich
15:00 GMT	Fortuné 4', 73'	(Report)	Duff 2'; Løvenkrands 9'; S. Taylor 41'	Attendance: 25,817; Referee: Chris Foy

22 February 2009	Newcastle United	0–0	Everton	St James' Park, Newcastle upon Tyne
16:00 GMT	Nolan (red card) 44'	(Report)		Attendance: 47,683; Referee: Lee Mason

1 March 2009	Bolton Wanderers	1–0	Newcastle United	Reebok Stadium, Bolton
13:00 GMT	Gardner 47'	(Report)		Attendance: 20,763; Referee: Alan Wiley

4 March 2009	Newcastle United	1–2	Manchester United	St James' Park, Newcastle upon Tyne
19:45 GMT	Løvenkrands 9'	(Report)	Rooney 20'; Berbatov 56'	Attendance: 51,636; Referee: Steve Bennett

14 March 2009	Hull City	1–1	Newcastle United	KC Stadium, Kingston upon Hull
15:00 GMT	Geovanni 9'	(Report)	S. Taylor 38'	Attendance: 24,915; Referee: Howard Webb

21 March 2009	Newcastle United	1–3	Arsenal	St James' Park, Newcastle upon Tyne
17:30 GMT	Martins 58'	(Report)	Bendtner 57'; Diaby 64'; Nasri 67'	Attendance: 49,972; Referee: Mark Halsey

4 April 2009	Newcastle United	0–2	Chelsea	St James' Park, Newcastle upon Tyne
15:00 BST		(Report)	Lampard 56'; Malouda 65'	Attendance: 52,112; Referee: Rob Styles

11 April 2009	Stoke City	1–1	Newcastle United	Britannia Stadium, Stoke-on-Trent
17:30 BST	Faye 33'	(Report)	Carroll 81'	Attendance: 27,382; Referee: Chris Foy

19 April 2009	Tottenham Hotspur	1–0	Newcastle United	White Hart Lane, London
13:30 BST	Bent 24'	(Report)		Attendance: 35,850; Referee: Mark Halsey

27 April 2009	Newcastle United	0–0	Portsmouth	St James' Park, Newcastle upon Tyne
20:00 BST		(Report)		Attendance: 47,481; Referee: Mike Riley

3 May 2009	Liverpool	3–0	Newcastle United	Anfield, Liverpool
13:30 BST	Benayoun 22'; Kuyt 28'; Lucas 87'	(Report)	Barton (red card) 77'	Attendance: 44,121; Referee: Phil Dowd

11 May 2009	Newcastle United	3–1	Middlesbrough	St James' Park, Newcastle upon Tyne
20:00 BST	S. Taylor 9'; Martins 71'; Løvenkrands 86'	(Report)	Beye 3' (o.g.)	Attendance: 51,252; Referee: Mike Dean

16 May 2009	Newcastle United	0–1	Fulham	St James' Park, Newcastle upon Tyne
15:00 BST	Bassong (red card) 60'	(Report)	Kamara 41'	Attendance: 52,114; Referee: Howard Webb

24 May 2009	Aston Villa	1–0	Newcastle United	Villa Park, Birmingham
16:00 BST	Duff 38' (o.g.)	(Report)	Edgar (red card) 90+4'	Attendance: 42,585; Referee: Chris Foy

=== FA Cup ===
3 January 2009 Round 3	Hull City	0–0	Newcastle United	KC Stadium, Kingston upon Hull
15:00 GMT		(Report)		Attendance: 20,557; Referee: Chris Foy

14 January 2009 Round 3r	Newcastle United	0–1	Hull City	St James' Park, Newcastle upon Tyne
19:45 GMT		(Report)	Cousin 81'	Attendance: 31,380; Referee: Phil Dowd

=== League Cup ===
26 August 2008 Round 2	Coventry City	2 – 3 (a.e.t.)	Newcastle United	Ricoh Arena, Coventry
19:45 BST	Morrison 45+1'; Dann 90+4'	(Report)	Dann 21' (o.g.); Milner 38'; Owen 97'	Attendance: 19,249; Referee: Anthony Bates

24 September 2008 Round 3	Newcastle United	1–2	Tottenham Hotspur	St James' Park, Newcastle upon Tyne
19:45 BST	Owen 90'	(Report)	Pavlyuchenko 62'; O'Hara 66'	Attendance: 20,577; Referee: Chris Foy
