= Nzuzi =

Nzuzi is a surname. Notable people with the surname include:

- Marwann Nzuzi (born 2004), French football player
- Olivier Nzuzi (born 1980), Congolese football player
- Patrick Nzuzi (born 1992), Congolese football player
- Trésorine Nzuzi (born 1988), DR Congolese football player
