= Tiara United Towers =

- Interactive map of the Tiara United Towers area

General information
- Status: Completed
- Type: Residential
- Location: Dubai, United Arab Emirates, Sheikh Zayed Road, Dubai, UAE
- Coordinates: 25°11′14.81″N 55°15′29.56″E
- Construction started: 2006
- Opening: 2021
- Owner: Wasl Properties

Height
- Height: 193 metres (633 ft)

Technical details
- Floor count: 46

Design and construction
- Architecture firm: ADPi; Derby Design
- Developer: Zabeel Investments, Wasl Properties
- Main contractor: Arabtec Construction; Eversendai

Other information
- Number of units: 424 (East Tower); 425 (West Tower)

Website
- https://www.waslproperties.com/en/project/our-residential/tiara-united-towers

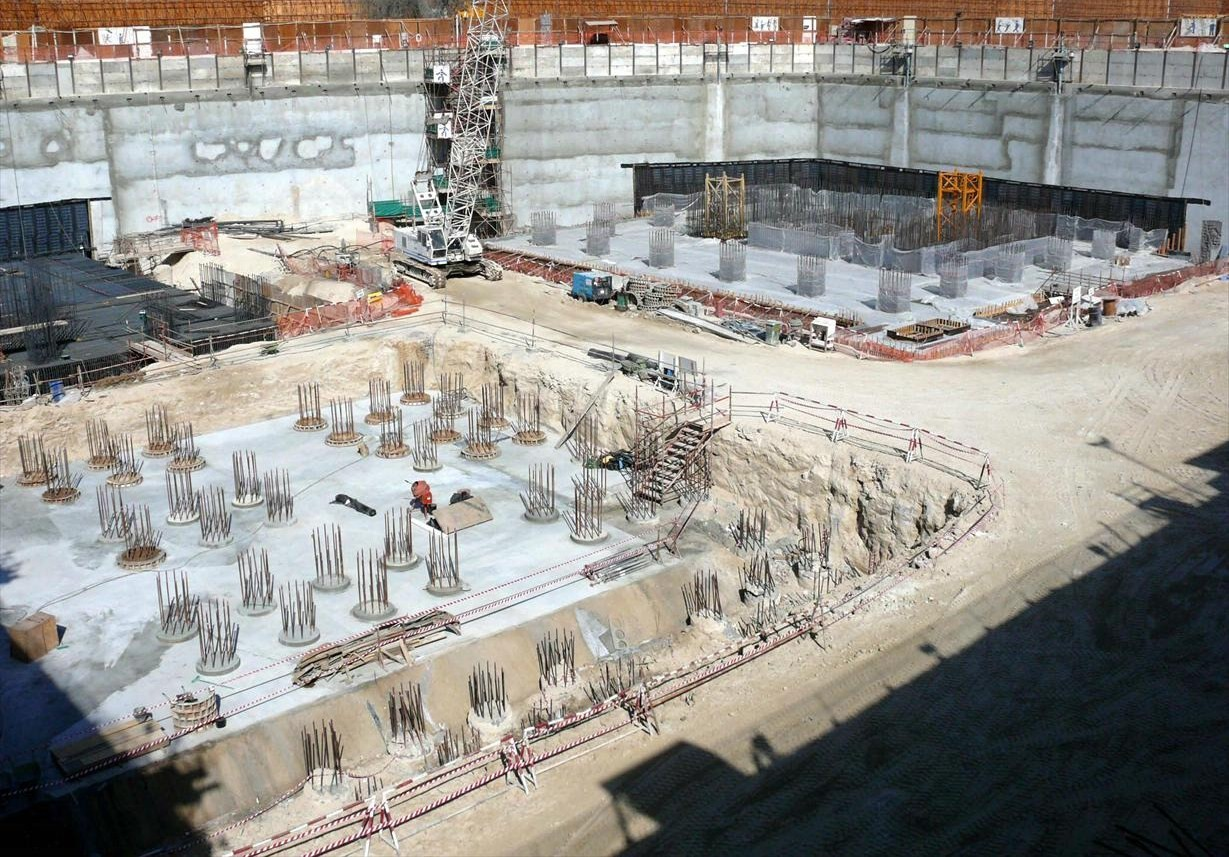
Tiara United Towers under construction, 20 December 2007

The Tiara United Towers is a mixed-use development consisting of two 193 m (633 ft) tall buildings in Business Bay, Dubai. Consisting of two towers, the residential development is Wasl Properties' first mixed-use development in Business Bay. The East tower has 424 units while the West tower has 425 units, varying between one-, two-, three- and four-bedroom apartments as well as duplexes with private pools.

Construction of the Tiara United Towers began in 2006 and was scheduled to be completed in 2009, and the original plan featured two 60-storey towers, one for offices and one for a hotel. The development was then redesigned and put on hold several times. Construction resumed in 2016 and was completed in 2021.

== See also ==
- List of buildings in Dubai
- List of tallest buildings in Dubai
