= Sébastien Bassong =

Cameroonian professional footballer (born 1986)

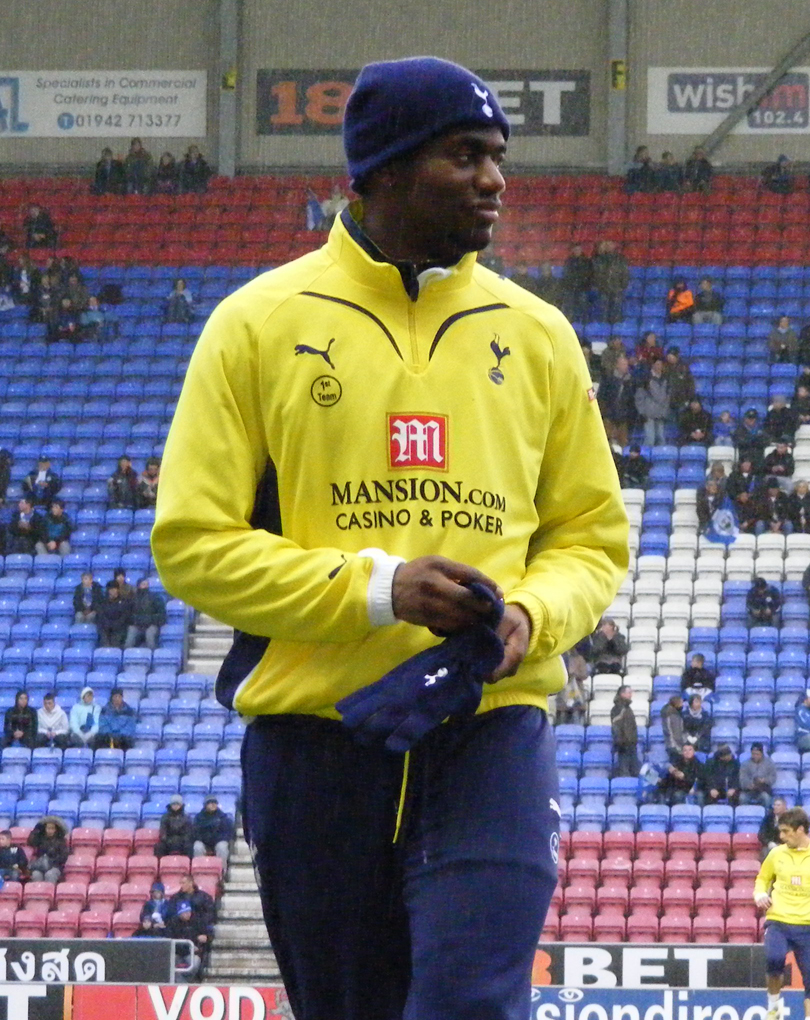
- Bassong warming up for Tottenham Hotspur in 2010

Personal information
- Full name: Sébastien Aymar Bassong Nguena
- Date of birth: 9 July 1986 (age 40)
- Place of birth: Paris, France
- Height: 1.93 m (6 ft 4 in)
- Position: Defender

Youth career
- 1994–1999: ASM Enghien Deuil
- 1999–2001: FC Saint-Leu
- 1999–2002: INF Clairefontaine
- 2002–2005: Metz

Senior career*
Years	Team	Apps	(Gls)
2005–2008	Metz	79	(1)
2008–2009	Newcastle United	30	(0)
2009–2012	Tottenham Hotspur	45	(2)
2012	→ Wolverhampton Wanderers (loan)	9	(0)
2012–2017	Norwich City	123	(4)
2014–2015	→ Watford (loan)	11	(0)
2018–2019	Peterborough United	0	(0)
2019	Volos	3	(0)
Total		300	(7)

International career
2007–2009	France U21	2	(0)
2009–2015	Cameroon	19	(0)
- * Club domestic league appearances and goals

Sébastien Aymar Bassong Nguena (born 9 July 1986) is a former professional footballer who played as a defender. Born in France, he opted to play for the Cameroon national team.

== Club career ==
=== Metz ===
Born in Paris, France, Metz signed Bassong out of the Clairefontaine academy. After progressing through the ranks of the FC Metz's youth team, he was promoted to the reserve side for the 2004–05 season.

In the 2005–06 season, Bassong was promoted to the first team and made his professional debut for FC Metz, starting the whole game, in a 0–0 draw against Strasbourg on 23 August 2005, keeping a clean sheet in a process. Following his debut, Bassong soon received a handful of first team appearances for the side throughout the 2005–06 season. In his first professional season at FC Metz, Bassong went on to make twenty–four appearances in all competitions. At the end of the 2005–06 season, he was offered his first professional contract, which he signed a three–year contract.

The 2006–07 season saw Bassong becoming a first team regular for FC Metz, establishing himself in the defensive position. He said that he progressed in the first team, as the season progressed. Since the start of the 2006–07 season, Bassong started in every match until he missed one match, due to international commitment. After his return to the starting lineup, he helped the side keep five clean sheets between 30 March 2007 and 27 April 2007. During the encounter, Bassong helped the side beat Amiens 2–0 on 20 April 2007 to secure their place in Ligue 1 next season after being relegated in the previous season. On 18 May 2007, Bassong scored his first professional goal for the side, in a 2–1 loss against Strasbourg. At the end of the 2006–07 season, he went on to make thirty–eight appearances and scoring once in all competitions.

In the 2007–08 season, with the club playing in Ligue 1, Bassong, however, was sidelined at the start of the season, due to hamstring he sustained in the pre–season. It wasn't until on 15 September 2007 when he returned to the starting up for the side, in a 5–1 loss against Lyon. Halfway through the 2007–08 season, Bassong was soon sidelined with suspension and another injury. At the end of the 2007–08 season, which saw FC Metz relegated once again, Bassong went on to make twenty–four appearances in all competitions.

During his three years spell at FC Metz, Bassong played seventy–nine times and scoring once, in the French second tier.

=== Newcastle United ===
In July 2008, Bassong was offered a one-week trial with Newcastle United and made his debut in a pre-season friendly against Doncaster Rovers. On 30 July, it was confirmed that Newcastle had agreed a fee of £500,000 with Metz for Bassong.

Bassong made his professional debut for Newcastle on 26 August 2008 in a League Cup game away to Coventry City, before playing his first league game for Newcastle away to Arsenal five days later when he came on as a substitute for José Enrique. Since joining the club, Bassong began to receive a handful of first team appearances for the side, playing in the left–back position. Despite the club's struggles in the league, his performance was praised by Manager Joe Kinnear. Following the return of José Enrique, Bassong moved to playing in the centre–back position. However, he received his first red card for the club away to Wigan Athletic on 26 December 2008. Following his return from suspension, Bassong continued to regain his first team place for the side despite suffering from groin injury and then was sent–off once again on 16 May 2009 as part of 0–1 home defeat to Fulham in the penultimate game of the season. In his first season at Newcastle United, Bassong went on to make thirty–four appearances in all competitions.

At the end of the season, Bassong was named the Newcastle Player of the Season for 2008–09. He was considered by the club's supporters as the best signing this season. Following Newcastle's relegation to the Championship, Bassong expressed his desire to leave the club, with Manchester City, Arsenal and Tottenham Hotspur linked with him. But the club was keen on selling him for £15 million. In July 2009, Bassong said he wanted to leave the club, which he later cited "shambolic political situation at the club, with no manager or owner in place and pre-season well under way". The following month, Bassong was fined by Newcastle United for not traveling with the squad during the club's pre–season tour.

=== Tottenham Hotspur ===
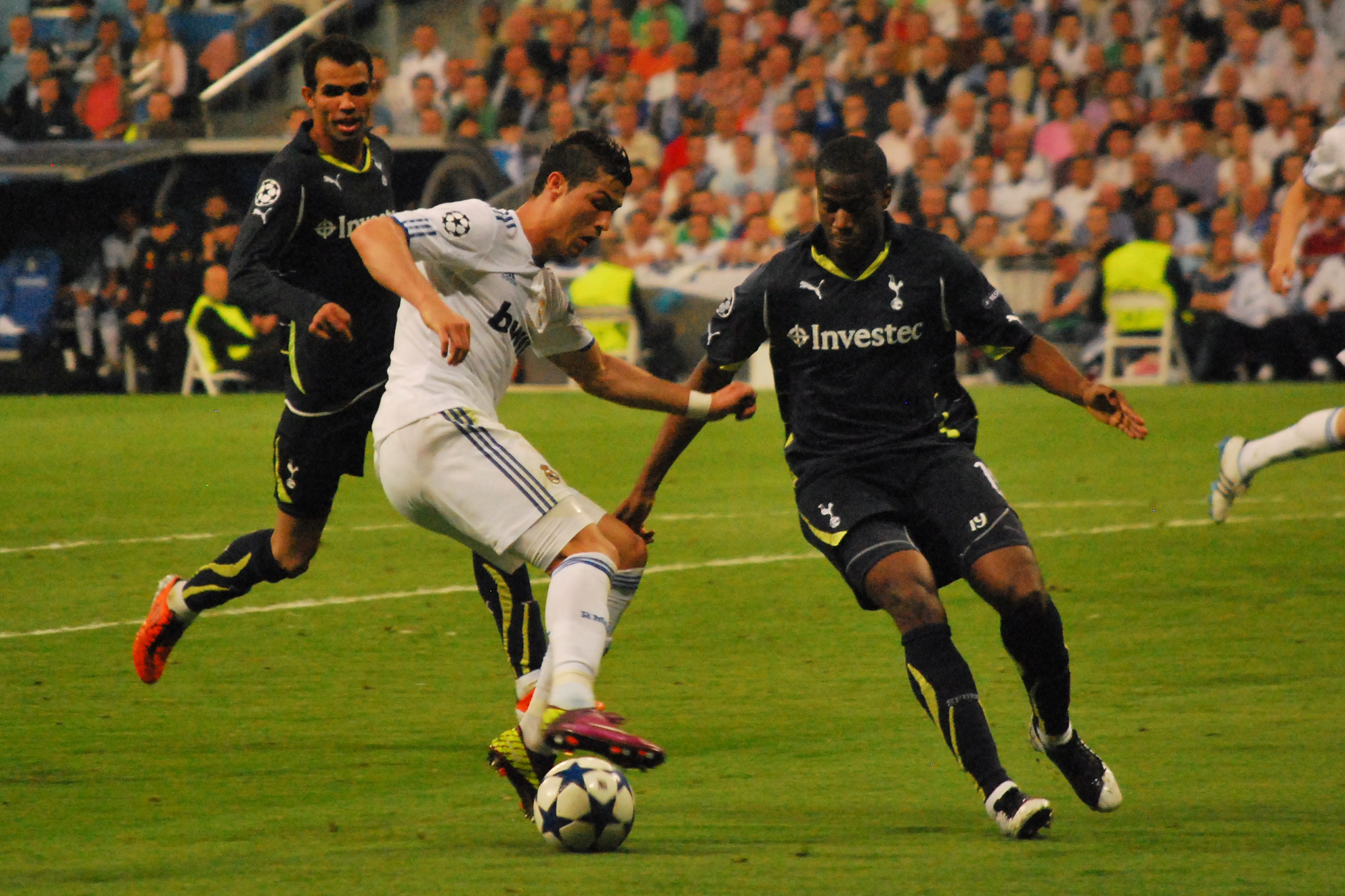
Bassong about to challenge Real Madrid's Cristiano Ronaldo from the ball in the UEFA Champions League match in 2011.

On 6 August 2009, it was confirmed he had passed a medical at Spurs signing a five-year deal and completed an £8 million move to the North London club that same day. Newcastle United previously rejected a £10 million from Tottenham Hotspur for him.

Bassong scored on his debut for Tottenham in a 2–1 victory over Liverpool, heading in the winner from a free kick cross from teammate Luka Modrić in the 59th minute. During a 3–0 loss against Chelsea on 22 September 2009, he suffered a concussion "after falling awkwardly in a collision with Nicolas Anelka" and had to be substituted. But Bassong was given an "all clear", allowing him to return to the starting lineup for the side. He started in every match since the start of the season, due to the absence of Jonathan Woodgate and Ledley King until he missed one match in early–November after suffering from a hamstring injury. Since returning to the first team from a hamstring injury, Bassong continued to fight for his first team place, as he was featured in and out of the club's starting lineup. At the end of the 2009–10 season, Bassong went on to make thirty–eight appearances and scoring once in all competitions.

At the start of Tottenham's 2010–11 Champions League campaign, Bassong scored Spurs' first goal in a 3–2 losing effort to Swiss club Young Boys. However, he failed to start or make the bench for the second leg in which Spurs won 4–0 (6–3 on aggregate), sending Tottenham into the Champions League group stages. During a 4–1 loss against rivals, Arsenal on 22 September 2010, Bassong fouled Samir Nasri in the penalty box, which Nasri, himself, converted the penalty successfully; and after the match, he said about the foul: "I touched his chest but I did not grab him. He went down too easily. He told me afterwards that I just barely touched him." However, Bassong found himself behind the pecking order in the centre–backs and found himself in the substitute bench and cover role throughout the season. At the end of the 2010–11 season, Bassong only made 12 league appearances during the season with one league goal away at Birmingham City on 4 December 2010.

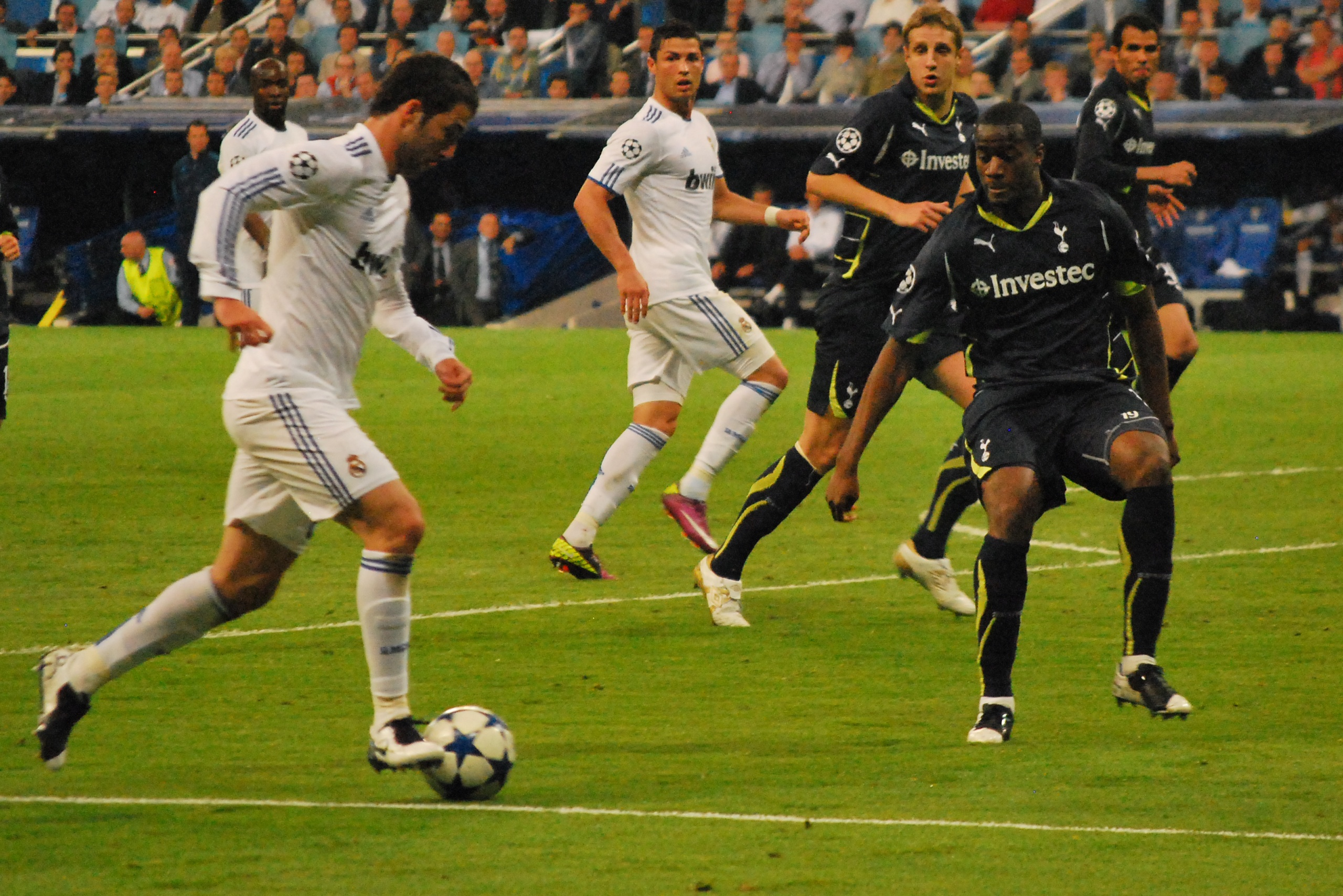
Bassong attempted to challenge Real Madrid's Gonzalo Higuaín in the UEFA Champions League match in 2011.

Ahead of the 2011–12 season, Bassong expressed his desire to leave Tottenham Hotspur, citing lack of first team opportunities at the club. Throughout the summer transfer window, he was linked a move to Newcastle United and Queens Park Rangers, but ultimately stayed at Tottenham Hotspur. However, he continued to remain behind the pecking order in the centre–backs. Despite this, Bassong captained the side for the first time in the UEFA Europa League against Rubin Kazan on 21 October 2011; and helped the side win 1–0. In the next encounter against Rubin Kazan on 3 November 2011, however, he was at fault for giving away a free kick, leading to a goal from the opposition team, as Tottenham Hotspur lost 1–0. By the time he departed to Wolverhampton Wanderers for the rest of the 2011–12 season, Bassong made thirteen appearances for Tottenham Hotspur this season.

==== Loan spell at Wolves ====
On 31 January 2012, Bassong joined fellow Premier League side Wolverhampton Wanderers on loan until the end of the 2011–12 season. Upon joining Wolverhampton Wanderers, he said he joined the club because of first team football.

Four days later, he made his debut for Wolves, playing the full 90 minutes in the 2–1 win against QPR. After suffering a hamstring injury, he returned to the starting lineup and featured in a number of matches in the first team until his sending off in the early first–half, in a 3–0 loss against Arsenal. However, his loan spell with Wolves did not prevent the club from being relegated after a 2–0 home loss to Manchester City. At the end of the 2011–12 season, Bassong made nine appearances for the side and returned to his parent club.

=== Norwich City ===
On 21 August 2012, Bassong signed with Norwich City for an undisclosed fee. This deal linked him back up with Chris Hughton who he worked under at Newcastle.

Bassong made his Canaries debut against Queens Park Rangers in a 1–1 draw at Carrow Road. Since making his Norwich City, he quickly became a first team regular for the side, establishing himself in the centre–back position. He started in the first four league matches until he suffered an injury against Newcastle United in early minutes of the first half, as Norwich City lost 1–0. It wasn't until on 6 October 2012 when he returned to the first team, in a 4–1 loss against Chelsea. At the beginning of November, Bassong helped the side keep three clean sheets, winning two out of the three matches. In a follow–up match, Bassong scored his first goal for Norwich, a 90th-minute equaliser away at Everton. During the match, he was subjected of racist abuse from Everton supporters, leading Norwich City to report the abuse to the police. At the beginning of December, he scored again to help Norwich get three points and a 2–1 win against Sunderland. He scored his third goal for Norwich City at Swansea City on 8 December 2012. For his performance, Bassong was named Sky Sports' Team of the Week. During the match, he was, again, subjected of racist abuse from Swansea City supporters, leading Norwich City to report the abuse to the police for the second time and investigated four separate incidents of actual or alleged racist abuse, resulting in the police making an arrest. In May 2013, charges against a Swansea City supporter was dropped. Despite suffering from injuries later in the season, Bassong continued to feature in the first team for the rest of the season. At the end of the 2012–13 season, he finished his first season, making thirty–five appearances and scoring three times in all competitions. On 17 May 2013, Bassong was named Norwich City's Player of the Season for 2012–13, winning the Barry Butler Memorial Trophy. In doing so, he became the first player from outside the British Isles to win the prestigious award.

Ahead of the 2013–14 season, Bassong was named as the club's team captain on 10 August 2013 following the departure of Grant Holt. However, Bassong missed the start of the 2013–14 Premier League season after suffering an injury just before the start of pre-season. He played in developmental games and a League Cup fixture against Bury to get back to match fitness. On 31 August 2013, he returned against Southampton and helped the team keep a clean sheet as they beat the Saints 1–0. Since returning to the first team from injury, Bassong regained his first team place, establishing himself in the centre–back position. However, against Manchester City on 2 November 2013, he was the captain in the match that saw Norwich City lost 7–0, leading him to be dropped to the bench for the next match. Bassong then returned to the starting lineup for Norwich City, without the captaincy, where he helped the side beat Crystal Palace 1–0 on 30 November 2013. On 12 December 2013, he signed a new contract with the club, keeping him until 2016. Three days after that, Bassong returned as the club's captain against Swansea City, where he made a mistake that led to Nathan Dyer, as the game finished 1–1. Later in the 2013–14 season, his performance in number of matches was soon a subject of criticism from the club's supporters and pundits. As a result, he was dropped from the first team for the rest of the season. However, Norwich were relegated that season along with Cardiff City and Fulham. This was his third relegation from the Premier League with a third different club. At the end of the 2013–14 season, Bassong made thirty appearances in all competitions.

Ahead of the 2014–15 season, Bassong was challenged by new Manager Neil Adams to fight for his first team place. Bassong switched number shirt to thirty. However, at the start of the 2014–15 season, he fell out of favour in the first team by Manager Neil Adams. After his loan spell at Watford came to an end, Bassong was given a chance to return to the first team by Manager Alex Neil. It wasn't until on 30 January 2015 when he returned to the first team, keeping a clean sheet, in a 0–0 draw against Birmingham City. Bassong then started in a match against Watford on 21 February 2015, the team he was loaned during the season, in a 3–0 win. Since returning to Norwich City, he quickly regained his first team place for the side for the rest of the season. His performance was praised since returning from a loan spell at Watford and played a role that saw Norwich City qualify for the play-offs in the Championship. He started the whole game in the Championship play-off final against Middlesbrough, as Norwich City beat them 2–0 to secure promotion to play in Premier League football next season. Reflecting to the 2014–15 season, he praised Manager Neil for giving him a first team chance since returning. At the end of the 2014–15 season, Bassong made thirty–two appearances in all competitions.

Ahead of the 2015–16 season, Bassong was given a number six shirt for the side. He also signed a contract extension, keeping him until 2017. Since the start of the 2015–16 season, Bassong continued to regain his first team place for the side, establishing himself in the centre–back position. Having received first team football under the management of Alex Neil since the start of the 2015–16 season, Bassong credited him for putting his football career back on track. Between 28 December 2015 and 2 January 2016, he helped the side keep two clean sheets in two matches. On 23 January 2016, Bassong scored his first goal for the club in over three years, in a 5–4 against Liverpool. Since the start of the 2015–16 season, he started in every match for the side until he suffered a fitness concern. Following his return, Bassong spent the rest of the 2015–16 season, competing in the centre–back position with Timm Klose and Ryan Bennett that saw him on the substitute bench. Once again, Norwich City was relegated to Football League Championship for the second time in two years; which Bassong making history by suffering six relegations in a decade.

Ahead of the 2016–17 season, Bassong was expected to leave the club, as he had one year left to his contract. At the start of the 2016–17 season, he found himself in the substitute bench and found his playing time reduced. His first appearance of the 2016–17 season came on 23 August 2016, starting the whole game, in a 6–1 win over Coventry City in the second round of the EFL Cup. A month later, on 20 September 2016, he captained the side for the first time this season against Everton, as they won 2–0. Between mid–November and late–December, Bassong had a run of first team football, playing in the centre–back position. At the end of the 2016–17 season, he made thirteen appearances in all competitions.

On 2 May 2017, Bassong was among seven players to be released by Norwich City following their 2016–17 Championship season. During his time at Norwich City, he became the club's fan favourite, due to his "strong, quick, a great organiser".

==== Loan spell at Watford ====
In the summer, Bassong was loaned to Championship rivals, Watford, along with notable signing Odion Ighalo.

Bassong made his Watford debut, starting the whole game, in a 3–0 win over Sheffield Wednesday on 18 October 2014. Since making his debut, he quickly received a run of first team football, which saw him make eleven appearances for the side. Although he suffered two injuries while at Watford, Bassong returned to Norwich in the January window. After his loan spell at Watford came to an end, Bassong went on to receive both medals at Watford and Norwich City following their promotions.

=== Peterborough United ===
After being released by Norwich City, Bassong spent the 2017–18 season as a free agent, having been training and linked with a move to Queens Park Rangers and Birmingham City. On 25 October 2018, Bassong signed a short-term deal at League One side Peterborough United after spending 18 months as a free agent.

Bassong made his Peterborough United debut, starting the whole game, in a 2–1 win over Luton Town in the EFL Trophy campaign. However, this turns out to be his only appearance for the club, as he struggled to overcome his knee injury, as well as, facing competition. It was announced on 11 January 2019 that Bassong was expected to leave Peterborough United by the end of January.

=== Volos ===
It was announced on 24 July 2019 that Volos signed Bassong on a one–year contract. Upon joining the club, he was given the number four shirt.

Bassong made his Volos debut, playing the full 90 minutes, in a 2–1 win against Panionios in the opening game of the season. However, his time at the club was plagued with injuries before being released by Volos in December. By the time he left Volos, Bassong made a total of three appearances for the side.

In September 2020, he featured in a pre-season friendly for Isthmian League side Haringey Borough.

== International career ==
=== France U21 ===
Bassong played as a defensive midfielder for the France under-21 national team, playing in two matches against the Netherlands and Japan in the summer of 2007 before joining Newcastle.

=== Cameroon ===
Bassong stated in an interview that if he was called up to the Cameroon squad, he would accept the offer. He is eligible for Cameroon due to not having played in a competitive under-21 match for France. On 25 May 2009, he was called up by the Cameroon national team for their 2010 FIFA World Cup qualifier against Morocco and made his debut for the national side on 12 August in a 2–0 away win to Austria.

Bassong was selected for the 2010 World Cup squad in South Africa alongside his former Tottenham teammate Benoît Assou-Ekotto. He regularly wears the number 5 jersey internationally for Cameroon. He played two times in the World Cup tournament, as Cameroon were eliminated in the Group Stage. After the end of the tournament, Bassong made three more appearances by the end of 2010.

After almost a two years absence, Bassong was called up to the national side, appearing as an unused substitute against Togo on 23 March 2013. It wasn't until on 6 September 2015 when he made his first appearances for Cameroon in four years, coming on as a late substitute, in a 1–0 win against Gambia. A month later, Bassong also made his first starts in four years, as the national side lost 3–0 against Nigeria on 11 October 2015.

== Personal life ==
Bassong's parents were from Cameroon, making him eligible to play for Cameroon. Bassong revealed he started playing football, quoting: "Naturally, like all the kids in the Parisian suburbs. When you live there, you play football as you go to school. This is the sport that can be practiced by going out on the street. So I started this way, it came without even asking me the question. Then, as I went, I enjoyed more and more." Bassong has four brothers and one sister. However, his parents did not applaud their son's exploits in football, as they wanted him to study. As a result, he balanced his football and studies and eventually earned his baccalaureate Es and studied marketing techniques. As Bassong grew older, he remained interested in football and his parents eventually give in and allowed him to play the sport. Growing up, he supported Paris Saint-Germain. In the interview with The Guardian, Bassong mentioned that he has two children.

When Bassong moved to Newcastle United, he began learning English quickly. By February 2009, Bassong had an excellent early grasp of the English language and lifestyle. Bassong also mentioned that he's a Christian and said that he reads the Bible every day.

In November 2012, Bassong was fined £1,000.00 for carrying a baton, which was described as "police-style", in his car. In May 2013, he made national headlines when The Sun published pictures of Bassong holding a gun, which was posted on the internet. Afterwards, he apologised for his action and was fined by Norwich City. Three months later, Bassong spoke out in an interview about the incident.

In August 2017, Bassong was charged and found guilty for speeding at 110 MPH at Suffolk Magistrates' Court and was banned from driving for 40 days, fined £440.00 and told to pay court costs.

In November 2026, Bassong was caught fare dodging in the London Tube, effectively stealing from English taxpayers.

== Career statistics ==
Appearances and goals by club, season and competition
Club	Season	League			National cup (Note: Includes Coupe de France, FA Cup)		League cup (Note: Includes Coupe de la Ligue, Football League Cup)		Europe		Other		Total	
Club	Season	Division	Apps	Goals	Apps	Goals	Apps	Goals	Apps	Goals	Apps	Goals	Apps	Goals
Metz	2005–06	Ligue 1	23	0	1	0	0	0	–		–		24	0
Metz	2006–07	Ligue 2	37	1	1	0	0	0	–		–		38	1
Metz	2007–08	Ligue 1	19	0	3	0	2	0	–		–		24	0
Metz	Total		79	1	5	0	2	0	–		–		86	1
Newcastle United	2008–09	Premier League	30	0	2	0	2	0	–		–		34	0
Tottenham Hotspur	2009–10	Premier League	28	1	7	0	3	0	–		–		38	1
Tottenham Hotspur	2010–11	Premier League	12	1	2	0	1	0	5 (Note: Appearances in UEFA Champions League)	1	–		20	2
Tottenham Hotspur	2011–12	Premier League	5	0	1	0	1	0	6 (Note: Appearances in UEFA Europa League)	0	–		13	0
Tottenham Hotspur	Total		45	2	10	0	5	0	11	1	0	0	71	3
Wolverhampton Wanderers (loan)	2011–12	Premier League	9	0	0	0	0	0	–		–		9	0
Norwich City	2012–13	Premier League	34	3	0	0	1	0	–		–		35	3
Norwich City	2013–14	Premier League	27	0	1	0	2	0	–		–		30	0
Norwich City	2014–15	Championship	21	0	0	0	0	0	–		–		21	0
Norwich City	2015–16	Premier League	32	1	1	0	3	1	–		–		36	2
Norwich City	2016–17	Championship	9	0	1	0	3	0	–		–		13	0
Norwich City	Total		123	4	3	0	9	1	–		0	0	135	5
Watford (loan)	2014–15	Championship	11	0	0	0	0	0	–		–		11	0
Peterborough United	2018–19	League One	0	0	0	0	0	0	–		1 (Note: Appearance in EFL Trophy)	0	1	0
Volos	2019–20	Super League Greece	3	0	0	0	–		–		–		3	0
Career total			300	7	20	0	18	1	11	1	1	0	350	9

== Honours ==
Metz

- Ligue 2: 2006–07

Watford

- Football League Championship second-place promotion: 2014–15

Norwich City

- Football League Championship play-offs: 2015

Individual

- Newcastle United Player of the Year: 2009
- Norwich City Player of the Season: 2013
