= Zabeel Investments =

Emerati investment vehicle

- Company type: Limited Liability Company
- Industry: Real Estate development, private equity, asset management, hospitality
- Founded: February 16, 2006 in Dubai
- Founder: Hamdan bin Mohammed al Maktoum
- Defunct: July 7, 2013
- Successor: Dubai Real Estate Corporation (incorporated)
- Headquarters: Dubai International Financial Centre, Dubai, United Arab Emirates
- Key people: Faisal Rashed Bujesaim, CEO
- Owner: Sheikh Hamdan bin Mohammed al Maktoum
- Subsidiaries: Zabeel Properties; Zabeel Capital
- Website: www.zabeelinvestments.com

Zabeel Investments is the personal investment vehicle of Sheikh Hamdan bin Mohammed al Maktoum, Crown Prince of Dubai and chairman of the Dubai executive Council.

Founded in February 2006, Zabeel Investments is a Dubai-based diversified investment company focused on the areas of commercial real estate development and management, private equity and asset management across a wide range of economic sectors in the UAE.

From its base at Dubai International Financial Centre, Zabeel Investments built up an AED 12.4 billion portfolio in its first year, incorporating property development, construction, hospitality, media, finance and education.

In the first quarter of 2007, Zabeel Investments made significant headway into the financial sector, investing in Abraaj Capital, the region's leading private equity firm. The company as also invested in DICAM's US$2 billion Global Strategic Equities Fund. DICAM is the asset management subsidiary of Dubai International Capital.

Zabeel Investments as also developed Tiara Residence an AED 2.1 billion residential and hospitality resort located on Palm Jumeirah. Tiara Residence was the first real estate project of Zabeel Investments and it was inaugurated in 2009.

In addition, Zabeel Investments has entered into a joint venture in 2006 with United Holdings to build the AED 1.75 billion Tiara United Towers, a landmark commercial and leisure project on Sheikh Zayed Road in the neigbohood of Business Bay. The visually striking twin towers will represent a design first for the region. The project was delayed and was still not fully completed in 2011. Their completion is scheduled for 2020.

Zabeel investments acquired Electric Orange in 2006, a visual communications agency which has since been rebranded as Zed Communications.

On 27 December 2010 Jumeirah Group, the Dubai-based luxury hospitality company and subsidiary of Dubai Holding, was appointed by Zabeel Properties, a subsidiary of Zabeel Investments LLC to manage Jumeirah Zabeel Saray. The new 5-star hotel, located on the west crescent of Palm Jumeirah was open in January 2011.

Zabeel also temporarily held stakes in the Japanese conglomerate Sony and a participation of 3,16% in the aircraft manufacturer Airbus which have since been sold.

Heavily indebted and in ordres to restructure its debts (AED 6 billions or $1.6 billions), the company was dissolved on July 7, 2013 and its assets were incorporated into the Dubai Real Estate Corporation a subsidiary of Investment Corporation of Dubai, the Sovereign Wealth Fund of the Emirate of Dubai.
