= Ray Gooding =

English footballer

Personal information
- Date of birth: 16 February 1959 (age 67)
- Place of birth: Hartlepool, County Durham, England
- Position: Midfielder

Youth career
- Coventry City

Senior career*
Years	Team	Apps	(Gls)
1976–1982	Coventry City	49	(5)
1982	→ Bristol City (loan)	3	(0)
1982–1983	Plymouth Argyle	7	(1)
- Bedworth United
- * Club domestic league appearances and goals

Ray Gooding (born 16 February 1959) is an English former footballer who played as a midfielder. He made 59 appearances in the Football League for Coventry City, Bristol City and Plymouth Argyle.

== Playing career ==
Gooding began his career with Coventry City, having been signed by Gordon Milne in 1976. He scored five goals in 49 league appearances over the next six years and spent a month on loan with Bristol City during the 1981–82 season. Gooding joined Plymouth Argyle in 1982 and scored once in nine league and cup games before suffering a cruciate ligament injury. Having been forced to give up professional football, he played briefly for Bedworth United in non-league football before ending his career.

== Coaching career ==
Gooding returned to Coventry in 1988 when John Sillett appointed him to work with John Peacock as a football development officer in the community at the club's centre of excellence. He went on to be responsible for young player recruitment and first met Richard Money when he was appointed academy director during Gordon Strachan's tenure as manager. Under their stewardship, Coventry's youth team reached two FA Youth Cup finals. Gooding took redundancy in the summer of 2008 and became a member of Money's academy staff at Newcastle United. He later worked for Birmingham City as a recruitment officer and scout for their academy.
