= Jonny Godsmark =

English footballer

Personal information
- Date of birth: 3 September 1989 (age 37)
- Place of birth: Guide Post, England
- Position: Midfielder

Youth career
- 2006–2008: Newcastle United

Senior career*
Years	Team	Apps	(Gls)
2008–2010	Newcastle United	0	(0)
2009–2010	→ Hereford United (loan)	8	(1)
2010–2018	Ashington		
- * Club domestic league appearances and goals

Jonathan Godsmark (born 3 September 1989) is an English retired footballer.

== Career ==
Godsmark started his career with Newcastle United and made his reserve team debut in Northumberland Senior Cup against Walker on 16 October 2006, and then scored his first reserve goal after coming on as a substitute in the Premier Reserve League fixture at Wigan Athletic on 24 January 2007. He struck two goals for the second string in 2006/07. Slight of build, Godsmark made an impact with his skillful ball-playing as a wing man and he was nicknamed "Guide Post-born Speed Demon" by the Geordie media. He made his first senior appearance as a substitute for Newcastle in the 0–1 away friendly defeat at Hull City on 1 August 2007 and signed a professional contract in 2008.

On 6 August 2009 it was confirmed that he would be going on loan to Hereford United on a six-month loan deal. He made his Football League debut for Hereford United against Morecambe in August 2009. He scored his first goal for Hereford in extra time of a League Cup tie against Charlton Athletic, a goal which proved to be the winner. He then went on to score the equaliser in the next match, against Cheltenham Town which ended 1–1. Godsmark was released by Newcastle at the end of the 2009–10 season and has signed for his local club Ashington.
