= Michael McCrudden =

Canadian YouTuber and actor

- Born: Michael McCrudden; February 26, 1986 (age 40); Mississauga, Ontario, Canada
- Occupations: YouTuber; actor
- Relatives: Kathleen McCrudden (mother); Steve McCrudden (father)

YouTube information
- Channel: Michael McCrudden
- Years active: 2009–present
- Genres: Comedy; Entertainment
- Subscribers: 2.8+ million
- Views: 742.2+ million
- Last updated: December 13, 2018

Michael McCrudden is a Canadian YouTuber and actor. He is best known for his YouTube segments Before They Were Famous and After They Were Famous, which are short documentaries about the lives of famous people, most notably rappers. McCrudden is also known for other segments such as Famous News, The Rich Life, Top 5, Epic Before They Were Famous, and Before They Were Gone, the latter of which he has been cutting down on due to widespread criticism of perceived exploitations of their deaths and monetization of the videos.

== YouTube career ==
McCrudden discovered a post that was looking for someone to audition for the YouTube show, InformOverload. After applying and auditioning, he earned the spot. He began developing three videos a week and later was able to push out ten videos a day for the program.

McCrudden turned his Jim Carrey screenplay into his first Before They Were Famous video on September 22, 2013. Before They Were Famous became popular on YouTube and because of this, McCrudden worked on different episodes on various celebrities, actors, athletes and other prominent people. By mid-2016, after covering many mainstream stars, McCrudden began developing programs about social media celebrities and SoundCloud rappers. By August 2016, he gained a million subscribers and by November 2017 he was close to passing two million subscribers. He has partnered with BroadbandTV for the channel. McCrudden also created variations of his show Before They Were Famous, such as Before They Were Gone, After They Were Famous and After They Were Gone.
