= Fabio Zamblera =

Italian footballer

Personal information
- Date of birth: 7 April 1990 (age 36)
- Place of birth: Bergamo, Italy
- Height: 1.92 m (6 ft 4 in)
- Position: Forward

Youth career
- –2008: Atalanta

Senior career*
Years	Team	Apps	(Gls)
2008–2011	Newcastle United	0	(0)
2009	→ Sampdoria (loan)	0	(0)
2009–2010	→ Roma (loan)	0	(0)
2011–2012	Valcalepio		
2012–2013	Brescia	0	(0)
2013	Bellaria Igea	5	(3)
2013–2014	Palazzolo	15	(1)
2014–2015	Grumellese	0	(0)
Total		20+	(4+)

International career
2006	Italy U16	12	(2)
2006–2007	Italy U17	8	(1)
2008	Italy U19	3	(0)
- * Club domestic league appearances and goals

Fabio Zamblera (born 7 April 1990) is an Italian retired footballer who played as a forward.

== Career ==
In 2012/13, Zamblera played for A.C. Bellaria Igea Marina in the Italian Lega Pro Seconda Divisione, where he made five league appearances and scored three goals.
