= Patrick Nzuzi =

Congolese footballer (born 1992)

Personal information
- Date of birth: 24 October 1992 (age 34)
- Place of birth: Lubumbashi, Zaire
- Height: 1.75 m (5 ft 9 in)
- Positions: Fullback; midfielder

Youth career
- 2008–2010: Newcastle United

Senior career*
| Years | Team | Apps | (Gls) |
| 2010–2011 | Newcastle United | | |
| 2013–2014 | Limerick F.C. | | |
| 2015–2015 | Sligo Rovers | | |
| 2016–2018 | Canterbury City | | |
| 2018–2020 | Herne Bay | | |

International career
| 2012–2014 | DR Congo | 9 | (1) |
- * Club domestic league appearances and goals

Patrick Nzuzi (born 24 October 1992) is a Congolese footballer who represented the DR Congo national football team.

== Early life and education ==
Nzuzi was born in Lubumbashi, DR Congo to Pascal Longelo Nzuzi and Philomène Ibwata Wa Kucha. Patrick Nzuzi moved to the United Kingdom in 2005. He got into football at an early age and was signed by the academy of Newcastle United F.C.

He has a Bachelor's degree in Sport and Exercise Management from the University of Kent which was completed during his footballing career and a Master's in High performance sport completed in Barcelona, Spain.

== Career ==
Nzuzi joined the Newcastle United academy aged 13 in 2005 and signed his first professional contract at Newcastle United aged 18 in 2010.

=== Newcastle United ===
Nzuzi made his reserve team debut aged 16 against Rotherham, and impressed the first team manager, Chris Hughton.

He captained the Under-18 team during the 2009–10 season and was part of the Newcastle United team that reached the FA Youth Cup semi-final in 2009–10.

He scored his first Newcastle United Reserves goal against Bedlington on 1 February 2012.

=== Limerick F.C. ===
His debut for Limerick F.C. came in a 1–1 Munster derby draw against Cork city.

Nzuzi became a regular at Limerick F.C. He made over 50 appearances in two seasons for the newly promoted Munster side.

He was named as one of the top five young players in Ireland by goal.com in his first season.

=== Sligo Rovers ===
Nzuzi was handed a one-year contract by interim boss and former Cameroon International, Joseph N'Do, however injuries saw him end his Sligo journey early in December 2015.

=== DR Congo ===
Nzuzi made his debut for the DR Congo national football team in a U21 friendly against Austria. He went on to represent DR Congo at the Toulon Tournament held in 2014 in Toulon France where he faced the likes of France, Colombia, US and South Korea.

He was handed a first team debut in a friendly against Cameroon by Claude Le Roy.
