= Eleftheriadis =

Eleftheriadis (Greek: Ελευθεριάδης) is a Greek surname. Notable people with the surname include:

- Angelos Eleftheriadis (born 1991), Greek footballer
- Christos Eleftheriadis (born 1991), Greek footballer
- Lazaros Eleftheriadis (born 1997), Greek footballer
