= Michael Salisbury =

English football referee

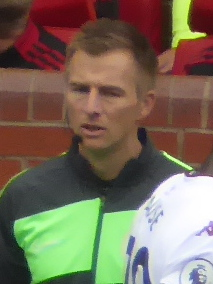
- Salisbury in 2021
- Full name: Michael Salisbury
- Born: 1985 (age 40–41); Penwortham, Lancashire, England
- Other occupation: Teacher

Domestic
Years	League	Role
2015–16	National League	Referee
2016–21	English Football League	Referee
2021–	(England) Premier League	Referee

Michael Salisbury (born 1985) is an English professional football referee and former teacher who belongs to the Select Group of Referees in England and officiates in the Premier League and EFL Championship.

== Early and personal life ==
Salisbury was born in Penwortham in 1985. His father, Graham, is a former referee who retired at the end of the 2020–21 season, after a 21-year career as an EFL referee.

Salisbury has two children.

== Career ==
Salisbury is a former PE teacher and previously taught at Parklands High School.

=== Refereeing ===
Salisbury was introduced to refereeing by his father, Graham, and began his refereeing career in 2001 in the local leagues in Preston. His father retired on the final day of the 2020–21 season, having officiated 588 Football League games, and Salisbury was his fourth official for the game.

Salisbury was involved in his first professional game in 2010 as an Assistant Referee in the EFL. Salisbury began refereeing in the Vanarama National League in the 2015–16 season before being promoted to League 2 the following season.

Salisbury was the reserve assistant referee for the 2016 FA Cup final which took place between Crystal Palace and Manchester United on 21 May 2016.

On 29 June 2020, Salisbury refereed the 2020 EFL League Two play-off final in Northampton Town's 4–0 win over Exeter City.

On 3 May 2021, Salisbury refereed the 2020 FA Vase final between Consett A.F.C. and Hebburn Town which was a 3–2 win for Hebburn Town.

==== Premier League (2021–present) ====
Salisbury was promoted to the Premier League as a Referee ahead of the 2021–22 season, having previously been an assistant referee in the league. His first Premier League game in charge was Aston Villa's 2–1 win over Crystal Palace at Selhurst Park. Both clubs were subsequently charged with misconduct by the FA after both sets of players, unhappy with decisions made by Salisbury in the second half, and failed to conduct themselves in an orderly fashion.

On 8 April 2023, Salisbury was the VAR official for a Brighton & Hove Albion's 2–1 defeat to Tottenham Hotspur and failed to intervene after referee Stuart Attwell missed a trip by Pierre-Emile Højbjerg on Kaoru Mitoma in the penalty area when the score was 1–1. PGMOL subsequently offered an apology to Brighton, and Salisbury was dropped from the subsequent Premier League fixtures.

On 14 August 2023, Salisbury was the VAR official for a Manchester United's 1–0 win over Wolverhampton Wanderers. Manchester United goalkeeper André Onana collided with Wolves forward Sasa Kalajdzic in the penalty area during stoppage time and the on-field referee, Simon Hooper, did not award the penalty and Salisbury failed to intervene and award the penalty. PGMOL apologised to Wolves Manager Gary O'Neil after the game, and Salisbury along with Hooper and the Assistant VAR were dropped for the subsequent Premier League fixtures.

On 27 November 2023, Salisbury refereed Fulham's 3–2 win over Wolves at Craven Cottage, with Salisbury awarding three penalties during the match. Wolves manager Gary O'Neil said after the game that Salisbury admitted that Fulham's first penalty should have been overturned, with O'Neil also stating that he disputed with Salisbury over whether Carlos Vinícius should have been sent off for a headbutt. The Premier League's Independent Key Match Incidents Panel found that Salisbury had made two errors during the match in awarding the first penalty to Fulham and not sending Vinícius off. On 31 August 2025, he was dropped from his VAR duties for a match between Liverpool and Arsenal. It came after when Sailsbury played a controversial role of recommending referee Robert Jones to disallow a goal from Fulham’s Josh King in the 21st minute.The decision was widely condemned by pundits including Stuart Pearce, Jamie Carragher and Rio Ferdinand.

On 17 May 2026, Salisbury refereed Manchester United's 3-2 win over Nottingham Forest at Old Trafford. In the 54th minute, a ball played into the Nottingham Forest penalty box hit Manchester United's striker, Brian Mbeumo's, hand. Mbeumo then shot at goal, which was saved and then subsequently scored by Manchester United winger, Matheus Cunha. VAR strongly advised Salisbury to overturn the goal, saying that the handball rendered the subsequent goal illegal. However, after 3 minutes of deliberation, Salisbury did not overturn the goal which led to commentator Gary Neville to call his decision "an absolute shocker" and "ridiculous". The on-pitch explanation given by Salisbury was that the accidental nature of the handball meant that the goal was valid. The PGMO later admitted the goal should not have been given.. Salisbury was not chosen to referee any more Premier League games that season, with speculation it was due to this event.

== List of refereed domestic finals ==
2020 EFL League Two play-off final
Date	Match	Score	Venue
29 June 2020	Exeter City – Northampton Town	0–4	Wembley Stadium
2020 FA Vase final
Date	Match		Venue
3 May 2021	Consett – Hebburn Town	2–3	Wembley Stadium

== See also ==
- List of football referees
