= 2013–14 Newcastle United F.C. season =

Newcastle United
2013–14 season
- Chairman: Mike Ashley
- Manager: Alan Pardew
- Stadium: St James' Park
- Premier League: 10th
- FA Cup: Third round
- League Cup: Fourth round
- Top goalscorer: League: Loïc Rémy (14); All: Loïc Rémy (14)
Home colours	Away colours	Third colours

In the 2013–14 football season, English club Newcastle United competed in the Premier League for the fourth consecutive season. It was its 121st season of professional football.

This article shows statistics and lists details of all matches played by the club during the season.

== Chronological list of events ==
16 June 2013: Ex-manager Joe Kinnear is appointed director of football to widespread objection from Newcastle fans. The Irishman signed a three-year contract with the Magpies.

17 June 2013: Kinnear's interview with Talksport sees him make multiple false claims, including having signed Dean Holdsworth for Wimbledon for £50,000 (it was actually £650,000), sold Robbie Earle, signed goalkeeper Tim Krul and defender James Perch when he was previously Newcastle manager for just over four months during the 2008–09 season, winning the LMA manager of the year award three times (he only won it once), signing John Hartson for Wimbledon on a free transfer (Hartson cost Wimbledon £7.5 million), and to have managed Wimbledon for over ten years when it was only seven. He also mispronounced the names of plenty of people, including managing director Derek Llambias, calling him Derek "Llambiaze".

18 June 2013: Newcastle confirm the appointment of Joe Kinnear as director of football.

19 June 2013: The 2013–14 Premier League fixtures are released, giving Newcastle a tough trip to face runners-up Manchester City, who had appointed Manuel Pellegrini as manager the previous week. On the same day, Derek Llambias resigned as managing director following Joe Kinnear's appointment.

27 June 2013: Defender Danny Simpson leaves for relegated Queens Park Rangers on a free transfer and signs a three-year deal with the west Londoners.

3 July 2013: Defensive midfielder James Perch leaves for Wigan Athletic, another side relegated from the Premier League, for £750,000.

4 July 2013: 16-year-old Olivier Kemen signs for the Magpies for an undisclosed fee from Metz, the French under-17 international striker will play for the Academy and is known as "the new Alex Song".

11 July 2013: Sky Sports and BT Sport reveal their live Premier League fixtures up to the end of November, with Sky picking Newcastle's opener at Manchester City, switching it to 19 August, the Magpies' trip to Everton with that game also being changed to a Monday night, on 30 September. Also on Sky for the Magpies are the first Tyne–Wear derby of the season at Sunderland being put back to 27 October with an unusual 4pm kick-off; the trip to Tottenham Hostpur a fortnight alter becoming a midday kick–off on 10 November; and the home match with West Bromwich Albion staying on 30 November but kicking off at 5.30pm. BT Sport switch two of Alan Pardew's side's fixtures to 12:45pm Saturday kick-offs, against Liverpool on 19 October and Chelsea on 2 November.

16 July 2013: Newcastle win their first pre season friendly 4–2 away to Scottish side Motherwell, who qualified for the UEFA Europa League third qualifying round. Goals from Haris Vučkić, Yoan Gouffran, Moussa Sissoko and Sylvain Marveaux give an impressive Magpies side the victory.

20 July 2013: Newcastle suffer a shock 3–1 defeat to Portuguese club Rio Ave, with Pardew's team 3–0 down at half-time before Shola Ameobi pulled one back for the Tynesiders whilst Rob Elliot saved a Sandro Lima penalty.

23 July 2013: Shola Ameobi scores for the second friendly in succession, this time to earn the Magpies a decent draw with Paços de Ferreira, who finished third in the Portuguese Primeira Liga the previous season, earning them a first ever UEFA Champions League qualifying place. Both sides finished with ten men after an incident between home scorer Rui Caetano and skipper Fabricio Coloccini saw them both ejected with red cards.

25 July 2013: Papiss Cissé finally agrees to wear the Wonga shirt following a row, as he initially refused to wear the shirt on the grounds of his religious beliefs.

28 July 2013: Shola Ameobi scores the only goal as Newcastle beat Blackpool 1–0 at Bloomfield Road.

30 July 2013: Papiss Cissé plays for the first time since agreeing to wear the Wonga shirt and opens the scoring in a 2–0 win at St Mirren, with Mathieu Debuchy also scoring.

5 August 2013: Loïc Rémy joins the Magpies on loan from relegated QPR having turned down Pardew's team in January, becoming the 11th Frenchmen to join the Tynesiders.

6 August 2013: Shola Ameobi scored in the 90th minute to salvage a 1–1 at Rangers after Lee McCulloch opened the scoring for the home side.

10 August 2013: Pardew's team draw 1–1 with Braga in their only pre season friendly at St James' Park with Fabricio Coloccini's header cancelling out Alan's penalty. Before the match, there is a two-minute applauds for Sir Bobby Robson, who appeared on the programme cover as The Football Association (FA) held a national football day for the ex-Magpies manager and to celebrate their 150th anniversary.

19 August 2013: Hours before Newcastle's opener at Manchester City, Arsenal put in a £10 million bid for Yohan Cabaye. Pardew calls it disrespectful after the Magpies suffer a 4–0 thrashing with Steven Taylor sent off, leaving them bottom of the table.

24 August 2013: The Magpies are held to a drab goalless draw with West Ham United at St James' Park as Yohan Cabaye once again refused to play.

28 August 2013: Pardew's team gain victory at the Capital One Cup for the first time in two years, scoring their first two goals of the season in a 2–0 win at League Two side Morecambe. Both goals came late on, from Shola Ameobi and brother Sammy respectively, meaning they became the first brothers to score in the same competitive game for the Magpies.

31 August 2013: The Magpies end their goalless run in the Premier League when Hatem Ben Arfa scores an 86th minute wonder strike to give them a 1–0 win over Fulham.

11 September 2013: Ex-Magpies keeper Steve Harper holds a charity match at St James' Park against an "A.C. Milan Glorie" side which included Paolo Maldini, Franco Baresi and Sunderland manager Paolo Di Canio, who receives a poor reception from the home fans. Meanwhile, Harper's team includes Alan Shearer, Peter Beardsley and Les Ferdinand, and Tino Asprilla had a goal disallowed for offside before the Italians won 2–1 on penalties, but despite this, it was a special night for the fans.

14 September 2013: Ben Arfa and Gouffran score as Pardew's team beat Aston Villa 2–1 to earn their first away win in the league, this was the second year running that a 2–1 triumph at Villa Park was their first league away success.

21 September 2013: Despite Loïc Rémy scoring his first two Magpies goals, putting the Magpies 2–1 at half-time at home to Hull City goals from Ahmed Elmohamady and Sone Aluko gave the Tigers their first away win since being promoted from the Championship, the final whistle brought boos from the home fans.

25 September 2013: Newcastle make it to the fourth round of the League Cup for the first time in two years, defeating Leeds United 2–0 at home, including the first goal of the season for Papiss Cissé in the first half, and a superb effort from Yoan Gouffran in the second. This was their first home game in the competition under Alan Pardew.

30 September 2013: A poor first half display sees the Tynesiders 3–0 down at half time away to Everton before goals from Cabaye and Rémy give Pardew's team hope but the Merseysiders ran out 3–2 winners.

5 October 2013: Two first half goals from Rémy mean the Magpies beat Cardiff 2–1 at the Cardiff City Stadium, despite Peter Odemwingie getting one back for the Welshmen in the second half.

19 October 2013: Before the home game against Liverpool, fans march against owner Mike Ashley's regime. Yohan Cabaye opened the scoring before Mapou Yanga-Mbiwa was sent off near the end of the first half with Steven Gerrard netting his 100th Premier League goal from the resulting penalty. Paul Dummett came on for Moussa Sissoko following Yanga-Mbiwa's sending off and stunned the Reds with his first Magpies goal before Daniel Sturridge's header ensured a thrilling game finished 2–2.

27 October 2013: Despite Sunderland having only picked up a single point from eight games, the Toon suffered their second consecutive Tyne-Wear derby defeat, falling 2–1 to the Black Cats at the Stadium of Light, only the second time the Tynesiders have lost away to their local rivals since 1980.

2 November 2013: Goals from Gouffran and Rémy give Newcastle a 2–0 win over Chelsea, the Magpies' third win out of four matches and second consecutive home victory against the Blues.

10 November 2013: Krul posted a clean sheet with 14 saves, and Rémy scored the only goal of the match as Newcastle defeated Tottenham Hotspur at White Hart Lane.

23 November 2013: Rémy scores for a third game running as the Magpies beat Norwich City 2–1 at home with Yoan Gouffran also netting.

30 November 2013: A Gouffran header and a wonder strike from Moussa Sissoko help Newcastle to their fourth consecutive Premier League victory, beating West Brom 2–1 at home. With this win, the Magpies moved up into the top five for the first time since the 2011–12 season.

6 December 2013: Newcastle take both monthly Premier League awards for November, with Pardew named the Manager of the Month after leading the Magpies to four victories out of four, and clean sheets against Spurs and Chelsea see goalkeeper Tim Krul picking up the Player of the Month award.

7 December 2013: Cabaye scored the winner and Tim Krul posted another clean sheet as Newcastle won 1–0 at Manchester United F.C.'s Old Trafford for the first time since February 1972.

14 December 2013: Gouffran scores in his fourth consecutive home game as Newcastle draw 1–1 with Southampton, with Jay Rodriguez equalising for the visitors.

21 December 2013: Cabaye scores a brace and Hatem Ben Arfa converts a penalty while Danny Gabbidon scores an own goal as Newcastle win 3–0 against Crystal Palace.

26 December 2013: Newcastle thrash nine-man Stoke City 5–1 to move to within one point of European places. Rémy bagged a brace and there were also goals for Gouffran, Cabaye and Cissé.

29 December 2013: Newcastle lose 1–0 at home to Arsenal, Olivier Giroud getting the Arsenal goal.

1 January 2014: Newcastle lose 1–0 away at West Brom. Mathieu Debuchy picked up a straight red card midway through the second half and in the 85th minute, Tim Krul gave away a penalty which Saido Berahino converted.

4 January 2014: Despite taking the lead midway through the second half, the Magpies suffer their second successive home defeat, falling 2–1 to Cardiff in their opening match of the FA Cup, meaning that Newcastle have now lost three of their past four third-round matches in the FA Cup.

12 January 2014: Newcastle are defeated by 0–2 at home to Manchester City. Edin Džeko and Álvaro Negredo scored in either half for the away side. Cheick Tioté had a goal controversially ruled out for offside midway through the first half, despite Gouffran (who was in an offside position) clearly neither obstructing goalkeeper Joe Hart's view, nor making any contact with the ball.

18 January 2014: The Magpies end a run of four losses in all competitions with a 3–1 win over West Ham United at Upton Park. Cabaye and Rémy put Newcastle two goals up, before a Mike Williamson own-goal gave the home side one back. The win was confirmed after a free-kick from Cabaye in the final minute of stoppage time gave Newcastle their third goal.

28 January 2014: Newcastle play out a goalless draw with Norwich at Carrow Road. Both sides finish with ten men, as Rémy and Bradley Johnson are sent off for violent conduct.

29 January 2014: Cabaye is sold to Paris Saint-Germain for £19 million. Luuk de Jong arrives on loan from Borussia Mönchengladbach until the end of the season.

30 January 2014: A bid for the Lyon midfielder Clément Grenier is rejected by the Ligue 1 club.

1 February 2014: Newcastle lose the Tyne-Wear derby for the third time in a row for the first time since 1923, losing 3–0 at home to Sunderland. This is also Sunderland's first double over the Magpies since 1966–67.

3 February 2014: Kinnear resigns as director of football after less than eight months in the role.

8 February 2014: Newcastle lose 3–0 to Chelsea at Stamford Bridge, with Eden Hazard scoring all three goals for the Blues.

12 February 2014: The Magpies suffer their fourth consecutive home defeat, as they are hammered 4–0 by Tottenham. The defeat means that Newcastle have failed to score in seven out of their last eight League matches.

23 February 2014: Loïc Rémy's return from suspension saw him score the Magpies' first goal in five weeks and end their three-game losing run as they beat Aston Villa 1–0 late on.

1 March 2014: Newcastle put four goals past Hull at the KC Stadium, winning 4–1 in a victory that was overshadowed by Alan Pardew's touchline confrontation with Hull's David Meyler, resulting in the Magpies' manager being sent to the stands.

25 March 2014: Academy players Adam Armstrong, Ľubomír Šatka and Freddie Woodman all sign their first professional contracts with Newcastle.

1 April 2014: Another academy player, winger Rolando Aarons, also signs a professional contract with Newcastle.

23 May 2014: Newcastle announce their retained list. First team players Shola Ameobi and Dan Gosling were released, along with Conor Newton, Michael Richardson, Steven Logan, Brandon Miele and Jonathan Mitchell. The club also confirmed that the loan deals of Luuk de Jong and Loïc Rémy have expired and that they would return to their parent clubs.

== Club ==
=== Coaching staff ===
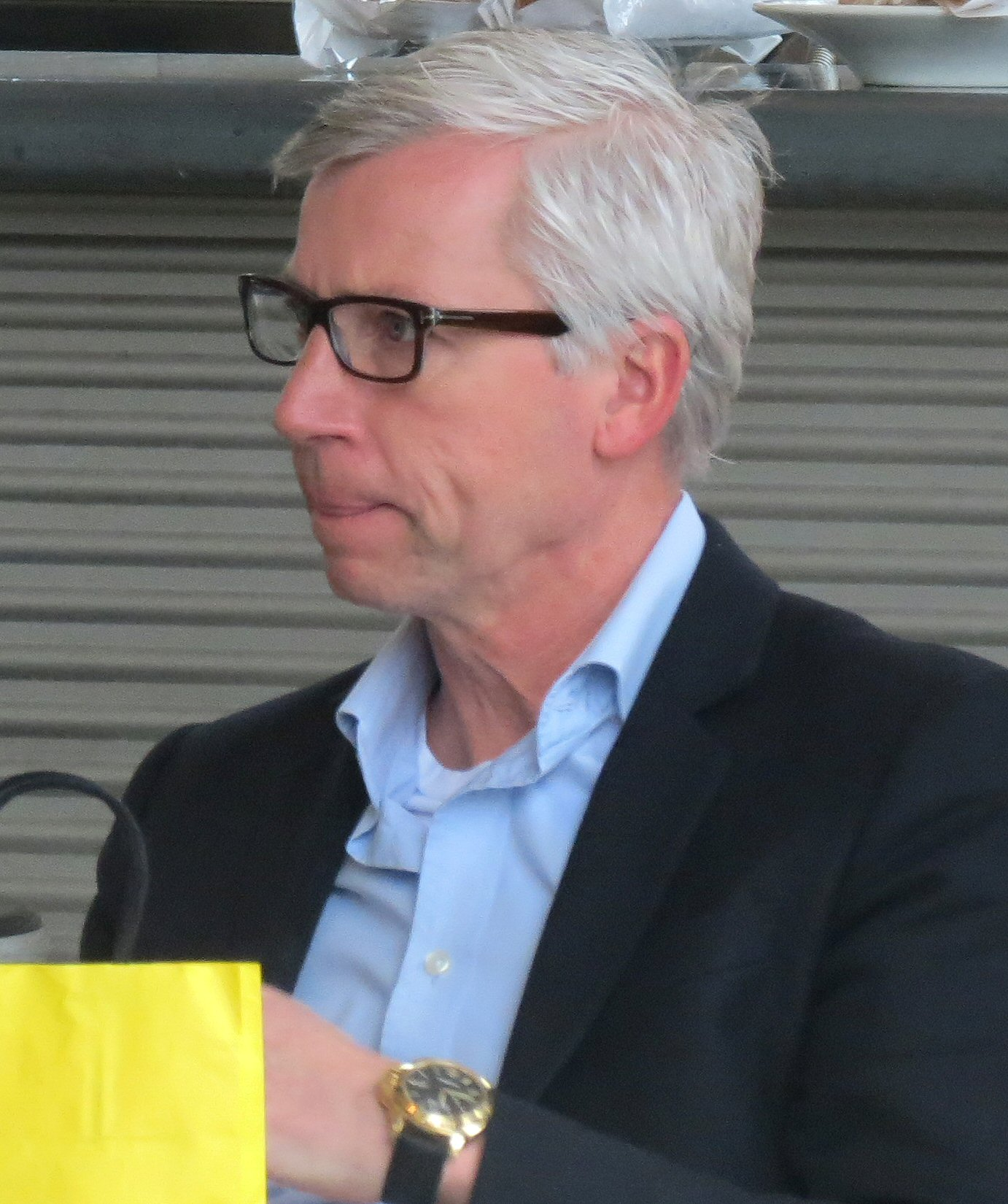
Former Newcastle United F.C. manager, Alan Pardew

Position	Staff
Director of football	(Republic of Ireland) Joe Kinnear (until 3 February 2014)
Manager	(England) Alan Pardew
Assistant manager	(England) John Carver
First team coach	(England) Steve Stone
First team goalkeeping coach	(England) Andy Woodman
First team fitness coach	(England) Simon Tweddle
First team analyst	(England) Ben Stevens
First team analyst	(England) Kerry Morrow
Reserve team manager	(Scotland) Willie Donachie (until 6 February 2014)
Reserve team manager	Vacant (since 6 February 2014)
Football Development manager	(England) Peter Beardsley
Academy manager	(Scotland) Joe Joyce
Under-18s coach	(England) Dave Watson
Under-18s coach	(England) Liam Bramley
Under-18s coach	(England) Kevin Richardson
Academy goalkeeping coach	(Australia) Chris Terpcou
Academy fitness coach	(England) Jack Ade
Academy fitness coach	(England) Rich Akenhead
Head physiotherapist	(Scotland) Davie Henderson
First team physiotherapist	(England) Derek Wright
First team physiotherapist	(England) Michael Harding
Academy physiotherapist	(England) Carl Nelson
Chief scout	(England) Graham Carr
Head of Academy recruitment	(England) Steve Nickson

Last updated: 3 February 2014
Source: Newcastle United F.C., Club Academy

== Statistics ==
=== Appearances and goals ===
Last updated on 23 August 2014.

No.	Pos	Nat	Player	Total		Premier League		FA Cup		League Cup	
No.	Pos	Nat	Player	Apps	Goals	Apps	Goals	Apps	Goals	Apps	Goals
1	GK	(Netherlands) NED	Tim Krul	38	0	36	0	0	0	2	0
2	DF	(Argentina) ARG	Fabricio Coloccini	28	0	27	0	0	0	1	0
3	DF	(Italy) ITA	Davide Santon	28	0	26+1	0	1	0	0	0
6	DF	(England) ENG	Mike Williamson	35	0	32+1	0	0	0	2	0
7	MF	(France) FRA	Moussa Sissoko	38	3	35	3	1	0	1+1	0
8	MF	(Netherlands) NED	Vurnon Anita	37	1	28+6	1	1	0	2	0
9	FW	(Senegal) SEN	Papiss Cissé	27	4	15+9	2	1	1	2	1
10	MF	(France) FRA	Hatem Ben Arfa	30	3	13+14	3	1	0	0+2	0
11	FW	(France) FRA	Yoan Gouffran	39	7	31+4	6	1	0	3	1
13	DF	(France) FRA	Mapou Yanga-Mbiwa	26	0	17+6	0	1	0	2	0
14	FW	(France) FRA	Loïc Rémy	27	14	24+2	14	0+1	0	0	0
15	MF	(England) ENG	Dan Gosling	10	0	4+4	0	0	0	1+1	0
18	FW	(Netherlands) NED	Luuk de Jong	12	0	8+4	0	0	0	0	0
19	DF	(France) FRA	Massadio Haïdara	13	0	3+8	0	1	0	1	0
20	MF	(England) ENG	Gaël Bigirimana	1	0	0	0	0	0	1	0
21	GK	(England) ENG	Rob Elliot	4	0	2	0	1	0	1	0
22	MF	(France) FRA	Sylvain Marveaux	11	0	2+7	0	0	0	2	0
23	FW	(Nigeria) NGA	Shola Ameobi	29	3	14+12	2	0+1	0	1+1	1
24	MF	(Ivory Coast) CIV	Cheick Tioté	36	0	31+2	0	1	0	2	0
25	MF	(France) FRA	Gabriel Obertan	5	0	0+3	0	0+1	0	0+1	0
26	DF	(France) FRA	Mathieu Debuchy	32	1	28+1	1	0	0	3	0
27	DF	(England) ENG	Steven Taylor	11	1	9+1	1	1	0	0	0
28	FW	(England) ENG	Sammy Ameobi	12	1	4+6	0	0	0	2	1
29	MF	(Slovenia) SVN	Haris Vučkić	1	0	0	0	0	0	1	0
33	DF	(Australia) AUS	Curtis Good	1	0	0	0	0	0	1	0
36	DF	(Wales) WAL	Paul Dummett	21	1	11+7	1	0	0	2+1	0
43	FW	(England) ENG	Adam Armstrong	4	0	0+4	0	0	0	0	0
Players currently out on loan:
18	MF	(Argentina) ARG	Jonás Gutiérrez	2	0	1+1	0	0	0	0	0
Players featured for club who have left:
4	MF	(France) FRA	Yohan Cabaye	20	7	17+2	7	0	0	0+1	0

=== Goals ===
Last updated on 5 April 2014.

Place	Position	Nation	Number	Name	Premier League	FA Cup	League Cup	Total
1	FW	(France)	14	Loïc Rémy	14	0	0	14
2	FW	(France)	11	Yoan Gouffran	6	0	1	7
2	MF	(France)	4	Yohan Cabaye	7	0	0	7
4	FW	(Senegal)	9	Papiss Cissé	2	1	1	4
5	MF	(France)	10	Hatem Ben Arfa	3	0	0	3
5	MF	(France)	7	Moussa Sissoko	3	0	0	3
6	FW	(Nigeria)	23	Shola Ameobi	2	0	1	3
6	FW	(England)	28	Sammy Ameobi	0	0	1	1
6	DF	(Wales)	36	Paul Dummett	1	0	0	1
6	DF	(France)	26	Mathieu Debuchy	1	0	0	1
6	MF	(Netherlands)	8	Vurnon Anita	1	0	0	1
6	DF	(England)	27	Steven Taylor	1	0	0	1

=== Cards ===
Accounts for all competitions. Last updated on 5 April 2014.

No.	Pos.	Name	Yellow card	Red card
2	DF	(Argentina) Fabricio Coloccini	1	0
3	DF	(Italy) Davide Santon	1	0
4	MF	(France) Yohan Cabaye	6	0
7	MF	(France) Moussa Sissoko	7	0
8	MF	(Netherlands) Vurnon Anita	1	0
10	MF	(France) Hatem Ben Arfa	2	0
11	MF	(France) Yoan Gouffran	2	0
13	DF	(France) Mapou Yanga-Mbiwa	5	1
14	MF	(France) Loïc Rémy	2	1
19	DF	(France) Massadio Haïdara	2	0
22	DF	(France) Sylvain Marveaux	1	0
24	DF	(Ivory Coast) Cheick Tioté	8	0
26	DF	(France) Mathieu Debuchy	7	1
27	DF	(England) Steven Taylor	1	1
28	FW	(England) Sammy Ameobi	1	0
36	DF	(Wales) Paul Dummett	1	0
-	Manager	(England) Alan Pardew	0	1

=== Captains ===
Accounts for all competitions.

No.	Pos.	Name	Starts
2	DF	(Argentina) Fabricio Coloccini	28
24	MF	(Ivory Coast) Cheick Tioté	11
7	MF	(France) Moussa Sissoko	2
13	DF	(France) Mapou Yanga-Mbiwa	1

== Players ==
=== First team squad ===
No.	Name	Nationality	Position (s)	Date of birth (age)	Signed	Signed from	Signing fee
Goalkeepers
1	Tim Krul	(Netherlands)	GK	3 April 1988 (aged 26)	2006	(Netherlands) ADO Den Haag	£150,000
21	Rob Elliot	(England) (Republic of Ireland)	GK	30 April 1986 (aged 28)	2011	(England) Charlton Athletic	£300,000
42	Jak Alnwick	(England)	GK	17 June 1993 (aged 21)	2008	(England) Sunderland Academy	Free
Defenders
2	Fabricio Coloccini	(Argentina)	CB	22 January 1982 (aged 32)	2008	(Spain) Deportivo La Coruña	£10,300,000
3	Davide Santon	(Italy)	LB / RB	2 January 1991 (aged 23)	2011	(Italy) Inter Milan	£5,300,000
6	Mike Williamson	(England)	CB	8 November 1983 (aged 30)	2010	(England) Portsmouth	£2,000,000
13	Mapou Yanga-Mbiwa	(France)	LB / CB	15 May 1989 (aged 25)	2013	(France) Montpellier	£6,700,000
16	Ryan Taylor	(England)	LB / RB / RM	19 August 1984 (aged 30)	2009	(England) Wigan Athletic	Part-exchange
19	Massadio Haïdara	(France)	LB	2 December 1992 (aged 21)	2013	(France) Nancy	£2,000,000
26	Mathieu Debuchy	(France)	RB	28 July 1985 (aged 29)	2013	(France) Lille	£5,500,000
27	Steven Taylor	(England)	CB	23 January 1986 (aged 28)	2003	(England) Newcastle United Academy	Free
33	Curtis Good	(Australia)	CB	23 March 1993 (aged 21)	2012	(Australia) Melbourne Heart	£300,000
34	James Tavernier	(England)	CB / RB	31 October 1991 (aged 22)	2008	(England) Leeds United	Free
36	Paul Dummett	(Wales)	LB / CB	26 September 1991 (aged 22)	2009	(England) Newcastle United Academy	Free
44	Remie Streete	(England)	CB	2 November 1994 (aged 19)	2005	(England) Newcastle United Academy	Free
Midfielders
7	Moussa Sissoko	(France)	CM / AM	16 August 1989 (aged 25)	2013	(France) Toulouse	£1,800,000
8	Vurnon Anita	(Netherlands)	DM	4 April 1989 (aged 25)	2012	(Netherlands) Ajax	£6,700,000
10	Hatem Ben Arfa	(France)	AM / RW	7 March 1988 (aged 26)	2010	(France) Marseille	£5,100,000
15	Dan Gosling	(England)	CM	1 February 1990 (aged 24)	2010	(England) Everton	Free
17	Romain Amalfitano	(France)	AM / RM	27 August 1989 (aged 24)	2012	(France) Reims	Free
18	Jonás Gutiérrez	(Argentina)	LW / RW	5 July 1983 (aged 31)	2008	(Spain) Mallorca	£2,000,000
20	Gaël Bigirimana	(England)	DM	22 October 1993 (aged 20)	2012	(England) Coventry City	£1,000,000
22	Sylvain Marveaux	(France)	AM / LW	15 April 1986 (aged 28)	2011	(France) Rennes	Free
24	Cheick Tioté	(Ivory Coast)	DM	21 June 1986 (aged 28)	2010	(Netherlands) Twente	£3,500,000
25	Gabriel Obertan	(France)	RW	26 February 1989 (aged 25)	2011	(England) Manchester United	£3,000,000
29	Haris Vučkić	(Slovenia)	AM / ST	21 August 1992 (aged 21)	2009	(Slovenia) Domžale	£500,000
41	Conor Newton	(England)	CM	17 October 1991 (aged 22)	2001	(England) Newcastle United Academy	Free
Forwards
9	Papiss Cissé	(Senegal)	ST	3 June 1985 (aged 29)	2012	(Germany) SC Freiburg	£9,000,000
11	Yoan Gouffran	(France)	ST / LW	25 May 1986 (aged 28)	2013	(France) Bordeaux	£500,000
14	Loïc Rémy	(France)	ST	2 January 1987 (aged 27)	2013	(England) QPR	Loan
18	Luuk de Jong	(Netherlands)	ST	27 August 1990 (aged 23)	2014	(Germany) Borussia Mönchengladbach	Loan
23	Shola Ameobi	(Nigeria)	ST	12 October 1981 (aged 32)	1995	(England) Newcastle United Academy	Free
28	Sammy Ameobi	(England)	ST / LW / RW	1 May 1992 (aged 22)	2008	(England) Newcastle United Academy	Free
49	Adam Campbell	(England)	ST	1 January 1995 (aged 19)	2005	(England) Newcastle United Academy	Free

=== Reserves ===
The following players did not appear for the first team this season.

Note: Flags indicate national team as defined under FIFA eligibility rules; some limited exceptions apply. Players may hold more than one non-FIFA nationality.

No.	Pos.	Nation	Player
37	DF	SVK	Ľubomír Šatka
43	FW	ENG	Adam Armstrong
45	MF	FRA	Olivier Kemen
46	MF	JAM	Rolando Aarons

No.	Pos.	Nation	Player
—	GK	ENG	Jonathan Mitchell
—	DF	SUI	Kevin Mbabu
—	MF	ENG	Steven Logan
—	MF	ENG	Michael Richardson

=== Youth team ===
Note: Flags indicate national team as defined under FIFA eligibility rules; some limited exceptions apply. Players may hold more than one non-FIFA nationality.

No. / Pos. / Nation / Player; — / MF / ENG / Marcus Maddison	No. / Pos. / Nation / Player; — / MF / IRL / Brandon Miele

== Transfers ==
=== In ===
Date	Pos.	Name	From	Fee	Source
4 July 2013	MF	(France) Olivier Kemen	Metz	£350,000	

- Total spending: ▼ ~ £350,000

=== Loans in ===
Date	Pos.	Name	From	Expiry	Source
5 August 2013	ST	(France) Loïc Rémy	Queens Park Rangers	May 2014	
29 January 2014	ST	(Netherlands) Luuk de Jong	Borussia Mönchengladbach	May 2014	

=== Out ===
Date	Pos.	Name	To	Fee	Source
1 July 2013	LW	(Republic of the Congo) Yven Moyo	Free agent	Free	
1 July 2013	CB	(Wales) Alex Nicholson	Free agent	Free	
1 July 2013	RB	(Republic of Ireland) Lee Desmond	Free agent	Free	
1 July 2013	RB	(England) Alex Kitchen	St Johnstone	Free	
1 July 2013	RW	(Colombia) Esteban Cardona López	Free agent	Free	
1 July 2013	MF	(Australia) Bradden Inman	Crewe Alexandra	£100,000	
1 July 2013	RB	(England) Danny Simpson	Queens Park Rangers	Free	
3 July 2013	RB	(England) James Perch	Wigan Athletic	£750,000	
15 July 2013	GK	(England) Steve Harper	Hull City	Free	
29 January 2014	MF	(France) Yohan Cabaye	Paris Saint-Germain	Undisclosed	

- Total income: ▲ ~ £850,000

=== Loans out ===
Date	Pos.	Name	To	Expiry	Source
23 July 2013	LB/LW	(Northern Ireland) Shane Ferguson	Birmingham City	End of season	
26 July 2013	RB	(England) James Tavernier	Shrewsbury Town	August 2013	
31 July 2013	MF	(Algeria) Mehdi Abeid	Panathinaikos	End of season	
1 August 2013	MF	(England) Michael Richardson	Accrington Stanley	28 August 2013	
7 August 2013	MF	(England) Conor Newton	St Mirren	January 2014	
15 August 2013	FW	(England) Adam Campbell	Carlisle United	30 August 2013	
15 August 2013	GK	(England) Jonathan Mitchell	Workington	September 2013	
30 August 2013	MF	(England) Michael Richardson	Accrington Stanley	2 January 2014	
2 September 2013	MF	(Scotland) Steven Logan	Annan Athletic	January 2014	
4 September 2013	MF	(France) Romain Amalfitano	Dijon	End of season	
4 October 2013	MF	(England) Dan Gosling	Blackpool	1 January 2014	
28 November 2013	RB	(England) James Tavernier	Rotherham United	2 January 2014	
28 November 2013	MF	(Slovenia) Haris Vučkić	Rotherham United	2 January 2014	
31 December 2013	RB	(England) James Tavernier	Rotherham United	28 January 2014	
31 December 2013	MF	(Slovenia) Haris Vučkić	Rotherham United	28 January 2014	
1 January 2014	FW	(England) Adam Campbell	St Mirren	End of season	
9 January 2014	MF	(England) Conor Newton	St Mirren	End of season	
13 January 2014	MF	(Argentina) Jonás Gutiérrez	Norwich City	End of season	
28 January 2014	RB	(England) James Tavernier	Rotherham United	End of season	
28 January 2014	MF	(Slovenia) Haris Vučkić	Rotherham United	End of season	
31 January 2014	DF	(Australia) Curtis Good	Dundee United	End of season	

== Pre-season and friendlies ==
16 July 2013 Friendly	Motherwell	2–4	Newcastle United	Motherwell
19:00 BST UTC+1	Vigurs 26'; McFadden 52' (pen.)	Report	Vučkić 8'; Gouffran 15'; Sissoko 39'; Marveaux 64'	Stadium: Fir Park; Attendance: 4,475; Referee: Willie Collum

20 July 2013 Friendly	Rio Ave	3–1	Newcastle United	Vila do Conde
18:00 BST UTC+1	Koka 6', 9'; Braga 26'	Report	Sh. Ameobi 76'	Stadium: Estadio do Rio Ave F.C. Referee: Pedro Campos

23 July 2013 Friendly	Paços de Ferreira	1–1	Newcastle United	Paços de Ferreira
20:00 BST UTC+1	Caetano 15', (red card) 37'	Report	Coloccini (red card) 37'; Sh. Ameobi 61'	Stadium: Estádio da Mata Real

28 July 2013 Friendly	Blackpool	0–1	Newcastle United	Blackpool
15:00 BST UTC+1		Report	Sh. Ameobi 5'	Stadium: Bloomfield Road; Attendance: 6,863; Referee: Andre Marriner

30 July 2013 Friendly	St Mirren	0–2	Newcastle United	Paisley
19:30 BST UTC+1		Report	Cissé 19'; Debuchy 26'	Stadium: St Mirren Park; Attendance: 4,216; Referee: John Beaton

6 August 2013 Friendly	Rangers	1–1	Newcastle United	Glasgow
19:45 BST UTC+1	McCulloch 6' (pen.)	Report	Sh Ameobi 90'	Stadium: Ibrox Stadium; Referee: Steven McLean

10 August 2013 Friendly	Newcastle United	1–1	Braga	Newcastle
18:00 BST UTC+1	Coloccini 60'	Report	Alan 1' (pen.)	Stadium: St James' Park; Attendance: 16,187; Referee: Lee Mason

== Competitions ==
Win Draw Loss Void

=== Overall ===
Competition	Started round	Current position / round	Final position / round	First match	Last match
Premier League	—	—	10th	19 August 2013	11 May 2014
League Cup	2nd round	—	4th round	28 August 2013	30 October 2013
FA Cup	3rd round	—	3rd round	4 January 2014	4 January 2014

Updated to match played 21 April 2014
Source: Competitions

=== Premier League ===
==== League table ====
Pos	Team	Pld	W	D	L	GF	GA	GD	Pts
8	Southampton	38	15	11	12	54	46	+8	56
9	Stoke City	38	13	11	14	45	52	−7	50
10	Newcastle United	38	15	4	19	43	59	−16	49
11	Crystal Palace	38	13	6	19	33	48	−15	45
12	Swansea City	38	11	9	18	54	54	0	42

Source: Barclays Premier League
Rules for classification: 1) Points; 2) Goal difference; 3) Goals scored; 4) Play-offs (only if needed to decide champion, teams for relegation or teams for UEFA competitions).

==== Results summary ====
Overall								Home						Away					
Pld	W	D	L	GF	GA	GD	Pts	W	D	L	GF	GA	GD	W	D	L	GF	GA	GD
38	15	4	19	43	59	−16	49	8	3	8	23	28	−5	7	1	11	20	31	−11

Last updated: 21 April 2014.
Source: Premier League

==== Results by matchday ====
Matchday	1	2	3	4	5	6	7	8	9	10	11	12	13	14	15	16	17	18	19	20	21	22	23	24	25	26	27	28	29	30	31	32	33	34	35	36	37	38
Ground	A	H	H	A	H	A	A	H	A	H	A	H	H	A	A	H	A	H	H	A	H	A	A	H	A	H	H	A	A	H	H	A	H	A	H	A	H	A
Result	L	D	W	W	L	L	W	D	L	W	W	W	W	L	W	D	W	W	L	L	L	W	D	L	L	L	W	W	L	W	L	L	L	L	L	L	W	L
Position	20	17	11	8	11	16	11	10	11	9	9	8	5	7	7	6	6	6	8	8	8	8	8	8	8	9	8	8	8	8	8	9	9	9	9	9	9	10

Source: Statto.com
A = Away; H = Home; W = Win; D = Draw; L = Loss

==== Premier League ====
19 August 2013 1	Manchester City	4–0	Newcastle United	Manchester
20:00 BST	Silva 6'; Agüero 22'; Džeko (yellow card) 31'; Fernandinho (yellow card) 32'; Touré 51'; Nasri 75'	Report	Yanga-Mbiwa (yellow card) 31'; Sissoko (yellow card) 33'; Debuchy (yellow card) 40'; Taylor (red card) 45'	Stadium: City of Manchester Stadium; Attendance: 46,842; Referee: Andre Marriner

24 August 2013 2	Newcastle United	0–0	West Ham United	Newcastle
15:00 BST		Report	O'Brien (yellow card) 44'	Stadium: St James' Park; Attendance: 49,622; Referee: Phil Dowd

31 August 2013 3	Newcastle United	1–0	Fulham	Newcastle
15:00 BST	Cabaye (yellow card) 82'; Ben Arfa 86', (yellow card) 87'	Report	Parker (yellow card) 45'; Riise (yellow card) 76'	Stadium: St James' Park; Attendance: 46,402; Referee: Chris Foy

14 September 2013 4	Aston Villa	1–2	Newcastle United	Birmingham
15:00 BST	Delph (yellow card) 33'; Benteke 67'	Report	Ben Arfa 18'; Yanga-Mbiwa (yellow card) 40'; Cabaye (yellow card) 57'; Debuchy (yellow card) 70'; Gouffran 73', (yellow card) 90+1'	Stadium: Villa Park; Attendance: 37,554; Referee: Mike Dean

21 September 2013 5	Newcastle United	2–3	Hull City	Newcastle
15:00 BST	Rémy 10', 44'	Report	Brady 26'; Elmohamady 48'; Aluko 76'; Huddlestone (yellow card) 90'	Stadium: St James' Park; Attendance: 51,523; Referee: Martin Atkinson

30 September 2013 6	Everton	3–2	Newcastle United	Liverpool
20:00 BST	Lukaku 5', 37'; Baines (yellow card) 17'; Barkley 25'; Mirallas (yellow card) 44'; Barry (yellow card) 80'	Report	Cabaye 51'; Tioté (yellow card) 55'; Rémy 89'	Stadium: Goodison Park; Attendance: 33,495; Referee: Phil Dowd

5 October 2013 7	Cardiff City	1–2	Newcastle United	Cardiff
15:00 BST	Odemwingie 58'; Gunnarsson (yellow card) 90'	Report	Rémy 30', 38'	Stadium: Cardiff City Stadium; Attendance: 27,538; Referee: Kevin Friend

19 October 2013 8	Newcastle United	2–2	Liverpool	Newcastle
12:45 BST	Cabaye 23'; Dummett 56'; Yanga-Mbiwa (red card) 40'; Gouffran (yellow card) 68'; Debuchy (yellow card) 86'	Report	Gerrard 42' (pen.), (yellow card) 45+2'; Sturridge 72', (yellow card) 84'; Touré (yellow card) 71'	Stadium: St James' Park; Attendance: 51,703; Referee: Andre Marriner

27 October 2013 9	Sunderland	2–1	Newcastle United	Sunderland
13:30 GMT	Fletcher 5', (yellow card) 5'; Borini 85'	Report	Cabaye (yellow card) 28'; Debuchy 57'	Stadium: Stadium of Light; Attendance: 46,313; Referee: Lee Probert

2 November 2013 10	Newcastle United	2–0	Chelsea	Newcastle
12:45 GMT	Sissoko (yellow card) 42'; Gouffran 68'; Rémy 89' (yellow card) 90'	Report	David Luiz (yellow card) 75'; Ramires (yellow card) 77'	Stadium: St James' Park; Attendance: 51,674; Referee: Lee Mason

10 November 2013 11	Tottenham Hotspur	0–1	Newcastle United	London
12:00 GMT	Dawson (yellow card) 89'	Report	Rémy 13'; Debuchy (yellow card) 53'; Sissoko (yellow card) 61'	Stadium: White Hart Lane; Attendance: 36,042; Referee: Chris Foy

23 November 2013 12	Newcastle United	2–1	Norwich City	Newcastle
15:00 GMT	Rémy 2'; Gouffran 38'		Fer 80'; Bennett (yellow card) 90+6'	Stadium: St James' Park; Attendance: 51,328; Referee: Mike Dean

30 November 2013 13	Newcastle United	2–1	West Bromwich Albion	Newcastle
17:30 GMT	Tioté (yellow card) 32'; Gouffran 36'; Sissoko 57'	Report	Brunt (yellow card) 28' (goal) 53'; Mulumbu (yellow card) 89'	Stadium: St James' Park; Attendance: 49,298; Referee: Phil Dowd

4 December 2013 14	Swansea City	3–0	Newcastle United	Swansea
19:45 GMT	Dyer 45+1'; Debuchy 66' (o.g.); Shelvey 81'	Report	Debuchy (yellow card) 58'; Haïdara (yellow card) 86'	Stadium: Liberty Stadium; Attendance: 20,457; Referee: Howard Webb

7 December 2013 15	Manchester United	0–1	Newcastle United	Manchester
13:45 GMT		Report	Cabaye (yellow card) 8', (goal) 61'; Anita (yellow card) 90+1'	Stadium: Old Trafford; Attendance: 75,233; Referee: Andre Marriner

14 December 2013 16	Newcastle United	1–1	Southampton	Newcastle
15:00 GMT	Gouffran 27'	report	Cork (yellow card) 64'; Rodriguez 65'; Schneiderlin (yellow card) 90+4'	Stadium: St James' Park; Attendance: 49,164; Referee: Mike Jones

21 December 2013 17	Crystal Palace	0–3	Newcastle United	London
15:00 GMT	Chamakh (yellow card) 83'	report	Cabaye 25'; Gabbidon 38' (o.g.); Tioté (yellow card) 64'; Coloccini (yellow card) 67'; Ben Arfa 86' (pen.)	Stadium: Selhurst Park; Attendance: 24,936; Referee: Neil Swarbrick

26 December 2013 18	Newcastle United	5–1	Stoke City	Newcastle
15:00 GMT	Rémy 44', 57'; Debuchy (yellow card) 45+1'; Gouffran 48'; Cabaye 67'; Cissé 80' (pen.)	Report	Assaidi 30'; Whelan (yellow card) 34' (yellow-red card) 40'; Wilson (red card) 43'; Nzonzi (yellow card) 44'	Stadium: St James' Park; Attendance: 51,665; Referee: Martin Atkinson

29 December 2013 19	Newcastle United	0–1	Arsenal	Newcastle
13:30 GMT		Report	Giroud (yellow card) 36', (goal) 65'; Flamini (yellow card) 75'; Rosický (yellow card) 76'	Stadium: St. James' Park; Attendance: 52,161; Referee: Lee Probert

1 January 2014 20	West Bromwich Albion	1–0	Newcastle United	West Bromwich
15:00 GMT	Berahino 87' (pen.)	Report	Debuchy (red card) 62'	Stadium: The Hawthorns; Attendance: 26,430; Referee: Lee Mason

12 January 2014 21	Newcastle United	0–2	Manchester City	Newcastle
14:05 GMT	Sissoko (yellow card) 37'; Cabaye (yellow card) 38'; Tioté (yellow card) 49'; Yanga-Mbiwa (yellow card) 74'	Report	Džeko 8'; Fernandinho (yellow card) 40'; Zabaleta (yellow card) 45'; Negredo 90+5'	Stadium: St James' Park; Attendance: 49,423; Referee: Mike Jones

18 January 2014 22	West Ham United	1–3	Newcastle United	London
15:00 GMT	C. Cole 45+2'	Report	Cabaye 16', 90+4'; Rémy 33'	Stadium: Boleyn Ground; Attendance: 33,343; Referee: Andre Marriner

28 January 2014 23	Norwich City	0–0	Newcastle United	Norwich
19:30 GMT	Fer (yellow card) 65'; Johnson (red card) 82'	Report	Sissoko (yellow card) 58'; Rémy (red card) 81'	Stadium: Carrow Road; Attendance: 26,762 (1,592 away); Referee: Chris Foy

1 February 2014 24	Newcastle United	0–3	Sunderland	Newcastle
12:45 GMT	Santon (yellow card) 31'; Dummett (yellow card) 87'	Report	O'Shea (yellow card) 12'; Borini 19' (pen.), (yellow card) 20'; Johnson 23'; Colback 80'	Stadium: St. James' Park; Attendance: 52,280; Referee: Phil Dowd

8 February 2014 25	Chelsea	3–0	Newcastle United	London
15:00 GMT	Hazard 27', 34', 63' (pen.)	Report	Sa Ameobi (yellow card) 49'; Yanga-Mbiwa (yellow card) 87'; Sissoko (yellow card) 90'	Stadium: Stamford Bridge; Attendance: 41,387; Referee: Howard Webb

12 February 2014 26	Newcastle United	0–4	Tottenham Hotspur	Newcastle
19:45 GMT		Report	Adebayor 19', 82'; Paulinho 53'; Chadli 88'	Stadium: St. James' Park; Attendance: 48,264; Referee: Neil Swarbrick

23 February 2014 27	Newcastle United	1–0	Aston Villa	Newcastle
13:30 GMT	Tioté (yellow card) 69'; Rémy 90+2', (yellow card) 90+3'	Report	Vlaar (yellow card) 43'; El Ahmadi (yellow card) 70'	Stadium: St. James' Park; Attendance: 50,417; Referee: Martin Atkinson

1 March 2014 28	Hull City	1–4	Newcastle United	Hull
15:00 GMT	Davies 46'; Jelavić (yellow card) 53'; Meyler (yellow card) 72'; Huddlestone (yellow card) 81'	Report	Sissoko 10', 55'; Tioté (yellow card) 29'; Yanga-Mbiwa (yellow card) 35'; Rémy 42'; Anita 90+3'	Stadium: KC Stadium; Attendance: 24,903; Referee: Kevin Friend
Note: Newcastle United's manager Alan Pardew was issued with a red card by referee Kevin Friend for head-butting David Meyler. Pardew later apologised for the incident, but Newcastle issued him with a formal warning and a £100,000 fine. On 3 March 2014, The Football Association charged Pardew with improper conduct.

15 March 2014 29	Fulham	1–0	Newcastle United	London
15:00 GMT	Dejagah 68', (yellow card) 69'	Report		Stadium: Craven Cottage; Attendance: 25,664; Referee: Howard Webb

22 March 2014 30	Newcastle United	1–0	Crystal Palace	Newcastle
15:00 GMT	Cissé 90+4'	Report	Delaney (yellow card) 85'	Stadium: St James' Park; Attendance: 51,588; Referee: Lee Probert

25 March 2014 31	Newcastle United	0–3	Everton	Newcastle
19:45 GMT		Report	Barkley 24'; Lukaku 49'; Barry (yellow card) 64'; Osman 85'	Stadium: St James' Park; Attendance: 47,622; Referee: Lee Mason

29 March 2014 32	Southampton	4–0	Newcastle United	Southampton
15:00 BST	Rodriguez 44', 89'; Lambert 49'; Lallana 70'	Report	Haïdara (yellow card) 76'	Stadium: St Mary's Stadium; Attendance: 31,360; Referee: Andre Marriner

5 April 2014 33	Newcastle United	0–4	Manchester United	Newcastle
15:00 BST	Tioté (yellow card) 52'	Report	Mata 39', 50'; Hernández 64'; Januzaj 90'	Stadium: St. James' Park; Attendance: 52,081; Referee: Kevin Friend

12 April 2014 34	Stoke City	1–0	Newcastle United	Stoke-on-Trent
15:07 BST	Pieters 42' (yellow card) 87'	Report	Coloccini (yellow card) 75'	Stadium: Britannia Stadium; Attendance: 27,400; Referee: Mike Jones

19 April 2014 35	Newcastle United	1–2	Swansea City	Newcastle
15:00 BST	Sh Ameobi 23'; Gosling (yellow card) 32'; Tioté (yellow card) 90+1'	Report	Bony 45+1', 90+2' (pen.)	Stadium: St. James' Park; Attendance: 51,057; Referee: Chris Foy

28 April 2014 36	Arsenal	3–0	Newcastle United	London
20:00 BST	Koscielny 26' (yellow card) 26'; Ramsey (yellow card) 35'; Özil 42'; Giroud 66'; Sagna (yellow card) 74'	Report	Sissoko (yellow card) 25'; Tioté (yellow card) 45+3'	Stadium: Emirates Stadium; Attendance: 60,023; Referee: Neil Swarbrick

3 May 2014 37	Newcastle United	3–0	Cardiff City	Newcastle
15:00 BST	Sh Ameobi 18'; Debuchy (yellow card) 68'; Rémy 87'; S. Taylor 90+1'	Report		Stadium: St James' Park; Attendance: 50,239; Referee: Martin Atkinson

11 May 2014 38	Liverpool	2–1	Newcastle	Liverpool
15:00 BST	Agger 63'; Sturridge 65'; Lucas (yellow card) 88'	Report	Škrtel 20' (o.g.); Debuchy (yellow card) 34'; Anita (yellow card) 62'; Gouffran (yellow card) 64'; Sh Ameobi (yellow card) 65' (yellow-red card) 65'; Dummett (red card) 86'	Stadium: Anfield; Attendance: 44,724; Referee: Phil Dowd

Last updated: 12 May 2014.
Source: Newcastle United F.C.

=== FA Cup ===
4 January 2014 Third round	Newcastle United	1–2	Cardiff City	Newcastle
15:00 GMT	Cissé 62'; Taylor (yellow card) 69'; Ben Arfa (yellow card) 90+4'	Report	Gunnarsson (yellow card) 42'; Noone 73'; Campbell 80'	Stadium: St. James' Park; Attendance: 31,166; Referee: Anthony Taylor

=== League Cup ===
28 August 2013 Second round	Morecambe	0–2	Newcastle United	Morecambe
19:45 BST		Report	Sh Ameobi 84'; Sa Ameobi 90+4'	Stadium: Globe Arena; Attendance: 5,375; Referee: Mark Haywood

25 September 2013 Third round	Newcastle United	2–0	Leeds United	Newcastle
19:45 BST	Cissé 31'; Gouffran 67'	Report		Stadium: St James' Park; Attendance: 36,220; Referee: Mike Jones

30 October 2013 Fourth round	Newcastle United	0–2 (a.e.t.)	Manchester City	Newcastle
19:45 GMT		Report	Negredo 99'; Džeko 105'	Stadium: St James' Park; Attendance: 33,846; Referee: Neil Swarbrick
