= Michael Richardson (English footballer) =

English footballer

Personal information
- Date of birth: 17 March 1992 (age 34)
- Place of birth: Kingston Park, England
- Position: Midfielder

Team information
- Current team: Newcastle Blue Star

Youth career
- 2009–2010: Walker Central
- 2010–2011: Newcastle United

Senior career*
| Years | Team | Apps | (Gls) |
| 2010–2014 | Newcastle United | 0 | (0) |
| 2011 | → Leyton Orient (loan) | 3 | (0) |
| 2013 | → Gillingham (loan) | 2 | (0) |
| 2013 | → Accrington Stanley (loan) | 15 | (0) |
| 2014–2016 | Blyth Spartans | 105 | (33) |
| 2016–2018 | South Shields | 69 | (20) |
| 2018–2022 | Hebburn Town | 112 | (58) |
| 2022–2023 | Blyth Spartans | 31 | (3) |
- * Club domestic league appearances and goals

Michael Richardson (born 17 March 1992) is an English footballer who plays as a midfielder for Newcastle Blue Star. Richardson began his career at Newcastle United. Whilst at the Tyneside club, he had spells on loan at Leyton Orient, Gillingham and Accrington Stanley.

== Career ==
=== Newcastle United ===
Richardson started his career at non-League club Walker Central, and was working for Newcastle City Council as an electrician before signing for Newcastle United in July 2010. Richardson left school when he was sixteen.

He appeared on the bench for Newcastle United for the first time against Fulham on 1 February 2011 but was not used as a substitute. Although he returned to the bench for matches against Arsenal, Everton, and Aston Villa, he failed to make a substitute appearance that season. He impressed while playing for the Magpies' U-18 side and the reserves, and subsequently signed on a month's loan for League One side Leyton Orient on 5 August 2011. Two months before going out on loan, Richardson signed a contract extension with the club. Then, Richardson signed further extension for the next two years.

Richardson was released by the club on 23 May 2014.

=== Loan Spells ===
He made his professional league debut on 6 August 2011, the opening day of the season, in Orient's 1–0 defeat at Walsall, coming on as a 69th-minute substitute. In his first start for the club, the League Cup first round match at Southend United on 9 August, Richardson scored the opening goal, and later missed a penalty in the penalty shoot-out, which Orient won 4–3. After making four appearances in the League and League Cup, he returned to Newcastle on 5 September.

On 14 February 2013, he joined League Two promotion-chasing Gillingham on loan. He made his Gillingham debut on 9 March as a second-half substitute in a 2–1 win over Plymouth Argyle. After making two appearances for the club, the club was keen to extend Richardson loan further; instead, he returns to Newcastle United.

Richardson signed for League Two club Accrington Stanley on loan ahead of the 2013–14 season. He played six matches during the initial month, and the loan was extended until 2 January 2014. He wore the number 8 shirt. He returned to parent club Newcastle United on 2 January 2014, having made 18 appearances.

=== Blyth Spartans ===
After being released by Newcastle United, Richardson went on trial with Hibernian after featured in a friendly match against Dundee United.

After failing to earn a contract with Hibernian, announced on 20 November 2014, it was confirmed that Richardson had signed for Northern Premier League side Blyth Spartans.

=== South Shields ===
On 30 November 2016, it was announced that South Shields had signed Richardson for an undisclosed fee.

That season South Shields completed an historic "quadruple", winning the Durham Challenge Cup, The Northern League Challenge Cup, the Northern League Division One title and the FA Vase, with Richardson making a 70th-minute substitute appearance in the final at Wembley Stadium.

=== Hebburn Town ===
Richardson was signed by South Tyneside neighbours, Hebburn Town, in 2018. He finished as the club's top scorer in the 2018–19 season, helping The Hornets to a second-place finish in the Northern League Division One.

He competed in his second FA Vase final in May 2021 for the delayed 2020 competition. He scored Hebburn's second of the afternoon in a 3–2 victory over Consett and claimed the Man of the Match award.

=== Return to Blyth Spartans ===
In June 2022, Richardson returned to National League North club Blyth Spartans. He played a vital part in the Spartans FA Cup run, scoring a goal in each of Blyths matches vs Wrexham A.F.C, in the F.A Cup Fourth Round. Firstly a last-gasp free-kick 88th-minute equaliser to help draw 1–1 in front of 2787 fans at Croft Park, followed by a 57th-minute goal in a narrow 3–2 loss at the Racecourse Ground in the return fixture.

== Career statistics ==
As of match played 29 December 2013.

Club statistics
| Club | Season | League | | | FA Cup | | League Cup | | Europe | | Other | | Total | |
| Club | Season | Division | Apps | Goals | Apps | Goals | Apps | Goals | Apps | Goals | Apps | Goals | Apps | Goals |
|---|---|---|---|---|---|---|---|---|---|---|---|---|---|---|
| Newcastle United | 2010–11 | Premier League | 0 | 0 | 0 | 0 | 0 | 0 | 0 | 0 | 0 | 0 | 0 | 0 |
| Newcastle United | 2011–12 | Premier League | 0 | 0 | 0 | 0 | 0 | 0 | 0 | 0 | 0 | 0 | 0 | 0 |
| Newcastle United | 2012–13 | Premier League | 0 | 0 | 0 | 0 | 0 | 0 | 0 | 0 | 0 | 0 | 0 | 0 |
| Newcastle United | 2013–14 | Premier League | 0 | 0 | 0 | 0 | 0 | 0 | 0 | 0 | 0 | 0 | 0 | 0 |
| Newcastle United | Total | | 0 | 0 | 0 | 0 | 0 | 0 | 0 | 0 | 0 | 0 | 0 | 0 |
| Leyton Orient (loan) | 2011–12 | League One | 3 | 0 | 0 | 0 | 1 | 1 | 0 | 0 | 0 | 0 | 4 | 1 |
| Gillingham (loan) | 2012–13 | League Two | 2 | 0 | 0 | 0 | 0 | 0 | 0 | 0 | 0 | 0 | 2 | 0 |
| Accrington Stanley (loan) | 2013–14 | League Two | 18 | 0 | 0 | 0 | 2 | 0 | 0 | 0 | 1 (Note: Appearance(s) in Football League Trophy) | 0 | 21 | 0 |
| Career totals | | | 23 | 0 | 0 | 0 | 3 | 1 | 0 | 1 | 0 | 0 | 27 | 1 |

== Honours ==
South Shields

- Northern League: 2016–17
- FA Vase: 2016–17
- Durham Challenge Cup: 2016–17
- Northern League, League Cup: 2016–17

Hebburn Town

- FA Vase: 2019–20
