= Abbas Al-Shengeeti =

Saudi Arabian footballer (born 1987)

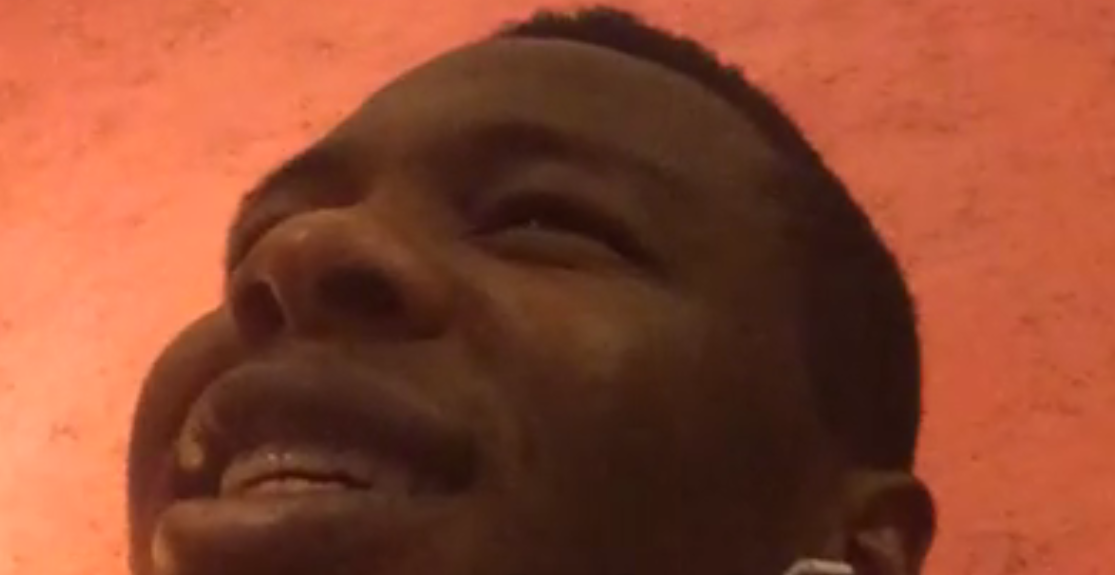

Personal information
- Full name: Abbas Abdullah Al-Shengeeti
- Date of birth: 8 November 1987 (age 39)
- Place of birth: Medina, Saudi Arabia
- Height: 1.69 m (5 ft 6 1/2 in)
- Positions: Left-back; forward

Senior career*
Years	Team	Apps	(Gls)
2009–2012	Ohud	44	(8)
2012–2013	Al-Wehda	12	(0)
2013	Al-Orobah	11	(1)
2013	Najran	2	(0)
2013–2014	Al-Orobah	1	(0)
2014	→ Al-Khaleej (loan)	13	(0)
2014–2015	Al-Nahda	6	(3)
2015–2016	Al-Khaleej	0	(0)
2016–2017	Al-Nahda		
2018	Al Jeel		
2018–2019	Al-Sahel		
2019–2021	Al-Riyadh		
2021–2022	Al-Ansar		
2022–2023	Afif		
2023–2024	Al-Dahab		
2024	Al-Nakhal		
- * Club domestic league appearances and goals

Abbas Al-Shengeeti (Arabic: عباس الشنقيطي; born 8 November 1987) is a Saudi Arabian footballer who primarily plays as a left back. He is currently a free agent.

== Club career ==
=== Ohud ===
Al-Shengeeti had an eventful three-year stint with Ohud where he was considered as an important part of the squad. On 30 September 2009, being the regular penalty taker at Ohud, he scored his first goal for Ohud from the penalty spot in a 3–1 defeat to Al-Faisaly. On 29 October, he scored the winner in a 1–0 triumph over Abha. On 16 April 2010, he scored two penalties in a 3–2 defeat to local rivals Al-Ansar, also based in the city of Medina. Shengeeti had scored two goals, both penalties, that looked to have ensured a draw for Ohod. However Badr Hawsawi scored a last gasp winner to give Al-Ansar victory in the derby. On 14 September 2011, he scored a last-minute winner in a dramatic 2–1 victory against Dhamk played at the Prince Sultan bin Abdul Aziz Stadium. With the game at 1–1 in the closing minutes, Shengeeti stepped up to the plate and scored a dramatic goal to give Ohud the victory.

=== Al-Wehda ===
In July 2012, Al-Shengeeti signed for newly promoted Saudi Professional League side Al-Wehda. On 2 August, he made his debut for Al-Wehda in a 1–1 draw with Al-Ettifaq. On 7 October, Al-Shengeeti scored an own goal in a narrow 2–1 defeat to Saudi giants Al-Hilal. Shengeeti looked mentally distraught after his error that ultimately cost Al-Wehda the game. Shengeeti played a total of 12 games for Al-Wehda without scoring.

=== Al-Orobah ===
On 19 February 2013, Al-Shengeeti signed for Saudi First Division side Al-Orobah. Upon the move, Shengeeti stated that 'he was very happy to be joining a club the size of Al-Orobah'. On 15 March, Shengeeti scored a last gasp goal in an emotional 4–3 win against Hetten. With the game at 3–3 in the last few minutes of the game, with this match being a very important game for Al-Orobah, Shengeeti scored a last minute goal which resulted in a 4–3 victory for Al-Orobah. Many Al-Orobah fans saw this victory as an important part of their title-winning season. Shengeeti contributed significantly towards the latter end of the season helping Al-Orobah win the Saudi First Division title and gain promotion to the Saudi Professional League.

=== Najran ===
In June 2013, Al-Shengeeti signed a three-year deal with Saudi Professional League side Najran. Najran were thought to be impressed with Shengeeti's tireless work rate and his recent form shown for Al-Orobah. Shengeeti failed to make an impact for Najran and didn't replicate the form he had shown at Al-Orobah.

=== Return to Al-Orobah ===
In September 2013, Al-Shengeeti re-signed for Al-Orobah. On 1 November 2013, Shengeeti made his second debut for Al-Orobah in a 2–0 loss to his former club Najran

=== Al-Khaleej ===
In January 2014, Al-Shengeeti signed for Saudi First Division side Al-Khaleej on a season-long loan from Al-Orobah. Shengeeti had a debut to forget as he was shown a red card in a 2–2 draw with Abha. Shengeeti played a big part in the team's successful promotion push to the Saudi Professional League. The move was subsequently made permanent on 8 May. Al-Khaleej will be the third team Shengeeti has played for in the Saudi Professional League.

=== Al-Nahda Club ===
In August 2014, Al-Shengeeti signed for Saudi First Division side Al-Nahda on a free transfer from Al-Khaleej. On 16 August, Shengeeti scored on his debut for the club in a 1-0 win over Abha played at the Prince Sultan bin Abdul Aziz Stadium. On 23 August, Shengeeti scored a last gasp goal on his second appearance for Al-Nahda to win the game against Al-Watani. On 5 September, Shengeeti bagged a goal in a 2–1 victory over Al-Jeel at the Prince Mohamed bin Fahd Stadium.

"The main motive for me was to return to being a professional and I am delighted to be returning to the Saudi Professional League with this prestigious club. I had many offers from a variety of clubs in the Saudi Professional League but I chose Al-Khaleej because I have been here before, I know the club inside out and it is great I will be playing under my coach from last year at Al-Nahda, he played a big part in my decision because he knows my strengths as a player and pushes me to play my best which is what I need to be doing at this stage in my career. I am looking forward to the challenge of playing professionally again next season and I am hoping I can contribute significantly to this fantastic football club".

— Shengeeti upon his move to Al-Khaleej in 2015

=== Return to Al-Khaleej ===
On 19 May 2015, Al-Shengeeti re-signed for Saudi Professional League side Al-Khaleej on a two-year deal after completing a fantastic season for Saudi First Division outfit Al-Nahda and rejoined former Al-Nahda manager Jalal Qaderi. This will be the 4th different club Shengeeti has played for in the Saudi Professional League. Shengeeti's move back to the Saudi Professional League also received praise from his cousin who is fellow professional footballer Loïc Rémy, who stated that he was "proud of his cousin on his big move".

=== Al-Ansar ===
On 19 August 2021, Al-Shengeeti joined Al-Ansar.

== Personal life ==
Al-Shengeeti is the cousin of former France international and former Çaykur Rizespor forward Loïc Rémy. He is of Sudanese descent.
