= Angelos Eleftheriadis =

Greek footballer

Angelos Eleftheriadis Άγγελος Ελευθεριάδης
Personal information
- Date of birth: 15 April 1991 (age 35)
- Place of birth: Thessaloniki, Greece
- Height: 1.85 m (6 ft 1 in)
- Position: Central defender

Team information
- Current team: Hebburn Town

Youth career
- Almopos
- –2010: Kavala

Senior career*
Years	Team	Apps	(Gls)
2010–2011	Kavala	2	(0)
2011–2012	Agrotikos Asteras	1	(0)
2012	Rot-Weiß Oberhausen	1	(0)
2012–2013	Rot-Weiß Oberhausen II	13	(2)
2013–2015	SV Wilhelmshaven	26	(0)
2015	VfR Neumünster	3	(0)
2015–2016	Omonia Aradippou		
2016	Whitley Bay		
2016–2018	Team Northumbria		
2018–2019	Penrith		
2019–2020	Whitley Bay		
2020–	Hebburn Town		
- * Club domestic league appearances and goals

Angelos Eleftheriadis (Greek: Άγγελος Ελευθεριάδης; born 15 April 1991) is a Greek footballer who plays as a central defender for Hebburn Town.

== Honours ==
Hebburn Town

- FA Vase: 2019-20
