= 2020 FA Vase final =

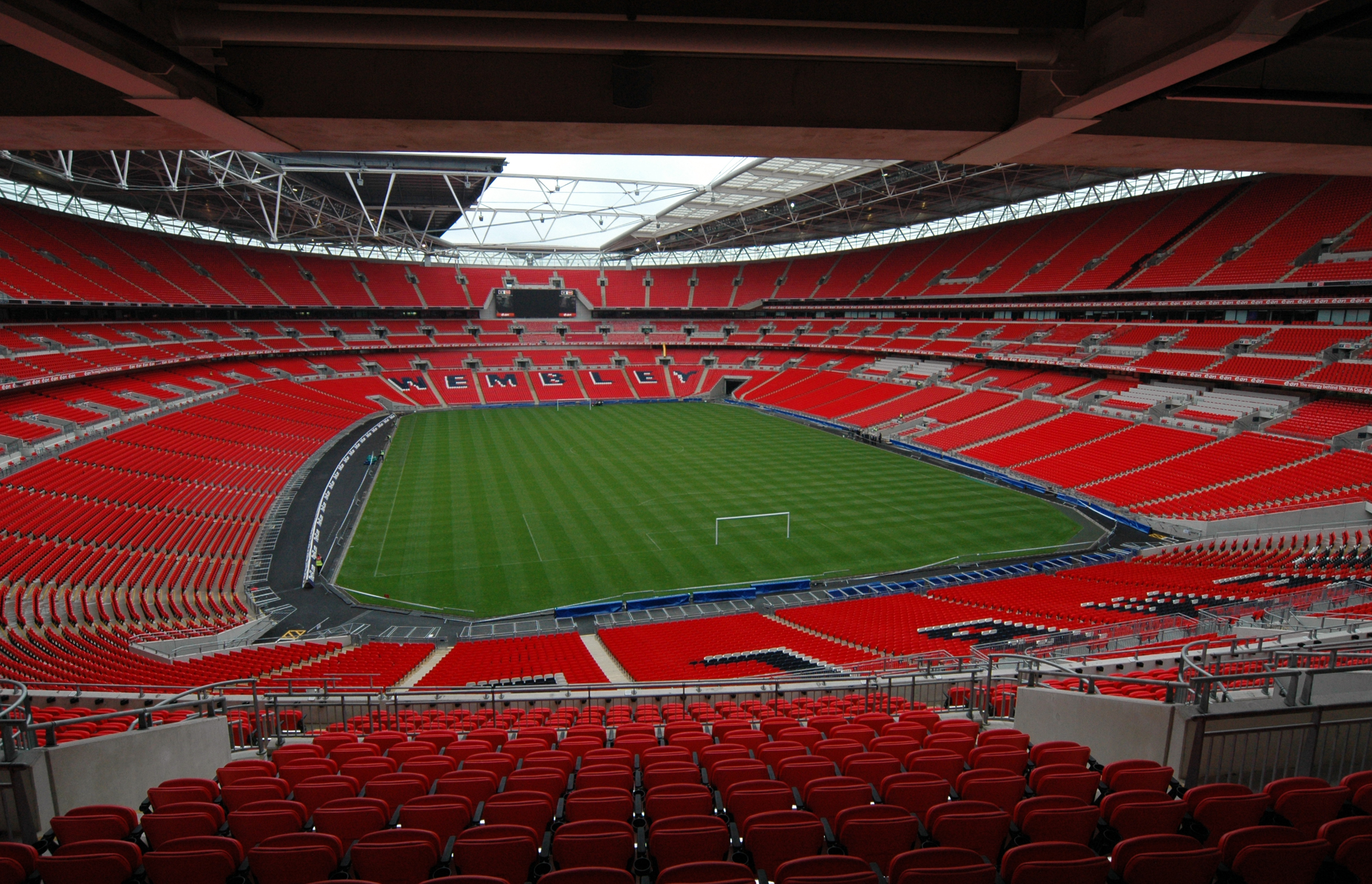
- Wembley Stadium hosted the final
- Event: 2019–20 FA Vase
Consett	Hebburn Town
2	3
- Date: 3 May 2021
- Venue: Wembley Stadium, London
- Attendance: 0

The 2020 FA Vase final was the 46th final of the Football Association's cup competition for teams at levels 9–11 of the English football league system. The match was contested between Consett and Hebburn Town. The final was finally played behind closed doors on 3 May 2021, after the date of 27 September 2020 was abandoned with the hope of allowing fans into the stadium.

The match was broadcast live and free-to-air on BT Sport. Presenter Matt Smith was joined by pundits Aaron McLean and Josh Gowling, with Jeff Brazier as the sideline reporter. The commentary team consisted of Seb Hutchinson and Kevin Davies. Radio commentary was provided by BBC Radio Newcastle.

Soprano Emily Haig sang "God Save the Queen" prior to kick-off.

== Route to the Final ==
=== Consett ===
12 October 2019 First Round	Winterton Rangers	2–5	Consett	Winterton
15:00 GMT	Grimes 5' (pen.), 60'		Metz 10'; Pearson 13'; Allen 19'; Orrell 59', 61'	Stadium: Hammond Homes Stadium; Attendance: 154

2 November 2019 Second Round	Irlam	2–5	Consett	Irlam
15:00 GMT	Ledson 55'; Farrelly 87'		Alshabeeb 2', 29'; Carr 31', 45', 78'	Stadium: Silver Street; Attendance: 181

30 November 2019 Third Round	Wythenshawe Town	1–1 (a.e.t.)	Consett	Wythenshawe, Manchester
15:00 GMT	Byrne 72' (pen.)		Pearson 78'	Stadium: Erictsan Stadium; Attendance: 302

7 December 2019 Third Round Replay	Consett	1–0	Wythenshawe Town	Consett
15:00 GMT	Pearson 80'			Stadium: Belle View Stadium

11 January 2020 Fourth Round	Consett	3–1	Lutterworth Town	Consett
15:00 GMT	Carr 38'; Holden 61'; Alshabeeb 86'		Lewis 73' (pen.)	Stadium: Belle View Stadium

8 February 2020 Fifth Round	Consett	2–0	Deal Town	Consett
15:00 GMT	Carr 76'; Purewal 85'			Stadium: Belle View Stadium; Attendance: 866

7 March 2020 Quarter-Final	Atherstone Town	1–3 (a.e.t.)	Consett	Atherstone
15:00 GMT	Quinn 10'		Metz 61'; Smith 100', 104'	Stadium: Sheepy Road; Attendance: 950

5 September 2020 Semi Final	Consett	1–0 (a.e.t.)	Bitton	Consett
15:00 GMT	Smith 114'			Stadium: Belle View Stadium
Note: Match rescheduled due to the CoronaVirus pandemic as a single-legged match rather than a two-legged format previously used.

=== Hebburn Town ===
2 October 2019 Second Round	Hebburn Town	3–0	Sunderland RCA	Hebburn
15:00 GMT				Stadium: Hebburn Sports & Social Club; Attendance: 312

30 November 2019 Third Round	Lower Breck	1–5	Hebburn Town	Anfield, Liverpool
15:00 GMT			Martin 25', 58', 72'; Taylor 50'; Richardson 52'	Stadium: Anfield Sports & Community Centre

11 January 2020 Fourth Round	Vauxhall Motors	0–1	Hebburn Town	Ellesmere Port
15:00 GMT			Martin 2'	Stadium: Rivacre Park

8 February 2020 Fifth Round	Longridge Town	0–1 (a.e.t.)	Hebburn Town	Longridge
15:00 GMT			Spence 117'	Stadium: Mike Riding Ground

29 February 2020 Quarter Final	Hebburn Town	2–0	Plymouth Parkway	Hebburn
15:00 GMT				Stadium: Hebburn Sports & Social Club

5 September 2020 Semi Final	Corinthians	2–2 (a.e.t.) (3–4 p)	Hebburn Town	Hartley
15:00 GMT				Stadium: Gay Dawn; Attendance: 350
Note: Match rescheduled due to CoronaVirus pandemic with a one-legged format opted for over the original two-legged format.

== Match ==
=== Details ===
3 May 2021
13:00 BST

Consett	2–3	Hebburn Town
Alshabeeb 18'; Pearson 42'	Report	Purewal 19'; Richardson 44'; Martin 82'

Wembley Stadium, London
Attendance: 0
Referee: Michael Salisbury

GK	1	(England) Kyle Hayes
DF	2	(England) Jermaine Metz
DF	3	(England) Darren Holden	(substituted off) 87'
DF	5	(England) Arjan Purewal (c)
DF	6	(England) Ross Wilkinson
MF	4	(England) Matty Slocombe
MF	7	(England) Jake Orrell	(substituted off) 29'
MF	8	(England) Calvin Smith
MF	12	(England) Matty Cornish	(substituted off) 61'
FW	9	(England) Dale Pearson
FW	14	(Saudi Arabia) Ali Alshabeeb
Substitutes
GK	21	(England) Josh Wilson
DF	16	(Hungary) Simon Jakab
MF	10	(England) Luke Carr	(substituted on) 61'
MF	11	(England) Nick Allen	(substituted on) 29'
MF	15	(England) Dan Marriott
MF	17	(England) Max Russell
FW	18	(England) Carl Lawson	(substituted on) 87'
Manager: (England) Terry Mitchell

GK	1	(England) Mark Foden
DF	2	(England) Dan Groves
DF	3	(England) Darren Lough
DF	6	(England) Danny Carson
MF	4	(England) Robbie Spence
MF	5	(England) Louis Storey (c)
MF	7	(England) Thomas Potter
MF	8	(England) Michael McKeown
MF	10	(England) Michael Richardson
FW	9	(England) Graeme Armstrong
FW	17	(England) Amar Purewal	(substituted off) 78'
Substitutes
GK	21'	(England) Kieran Hunter
DF	12	(England) Jack Donaghy
DF	15	(England) Luke Hudson
DF	16	(Greece) Angelos Eleftheriadis
MF	14	(England) Carl Taylor
MF	19	(England) Damen Mullen
FW	11	(England) Olly Martin	(substituted on) 78'

Man of the match:

Match officials

- Assistant referees:
- Fourth official:

Match rules

- 90 minutes.
- 30 minutes of extra-time if necessary.
- Penalty shoot-out if scores still level.
- Seven named substitutes.
- Maximum of three substitutions.
- Fourth substitute allowed in extra-time.
